= 2025 Big Ten men's basketball tournament =

American college basketball postseason tournament

- Classification: Division I
- Season: 2024–25
- Teams: 15
- Site: Gainbridge Fieldhouse; Indianapolis, Indiana
- Champions: Michigan (4th* title)
- Winning coach: Dusty May (1st title)
- MVP: Vladislav Goldin (Michigan)
- Television: Peacock, BTN, CBS/Paramount+

2024–25 Big Ten Conference men's basketball standings
| | Conf. | | | | Overall |
| Team | W | | L | PCT | W | | L | PCT |
|---|---|---|---|---|---|---|---|---|
| No. 7 Michigan State | 17 | – | 3 | .850 | 30 | – | 7 | .811 |
| No. 9 Maryland | 14 | – | 6 | .700 | 27 | – | 9 | .750 |
| No. 10 Michigan † | 14 | – | 6 | .700 | 27 | – | 10 | .730 |
| UCLA | 13 | – | 7 | .650 | 23 | – | 11 | .676 |
| No. 16 Wisconsin | 13 | – | 7 | .650 | 27 | – | 10 | .730 |
| No. 14 Purdue | 13 | – | 7 | .650 | 24 | – | 12 | .667 |
| Illinois | 12 | – | 8 | .600 | 22 | – | 13 | .629 |
| Oregon | 12 | – | 8 | .600 | 25 | – | 10 | .714 |
| Indiana | 10 | – | 10 | .500 | 19 | – | 13 | .594 |
| Ohio State | 9 | – | 11 | .450 | 17 | – | 15 | .531 |
| Rutgers | 8 | – | 12 | .400 | 15 | – | 17 | .469 |
| Minnesota | 7 | – | 13 | .350 | 15 | – | 17 | .469 |
| Northwestern | 7 | – | 13 | .350 | 17 | – | 16 | .515 |
| USC | 7 | – | 13 | .350 | 17 | – | 18 | .486 |
| Iowa | 7 | – | 13 | .350 | 17 | – | 16 | .515 |
| Nebraska | 7 | – | 13 | .350 | 21 | – | 14 | .600 |
| Penn State | 6 | – | 14 | .300 | 16 | – | 15 | .516 |
| Washington | 4 | – | 16 | .200 | 13 | – | 18 | .419 |
† 2025 Big Ten tournament winner Rankings from AP poll

The 2025 Big Ten men's basketball tournament (branded as the 2025 TIAA Big Ten Men's Basketball Tournament for sponsorship reasons) was a postseason men's basketball tournament for the Big Ten Conference in the 2024–25 NCAA Division I men's basketball season. The tournament took place from March 12–16, 2025 and was held at the Gainbridge Fieldhouse in Indianapolis, Indiana. As the tournament winner, Michigan received the conference's automatic bid to the 2025 NCAA Division I men's basketball tournament.

This was the first edition since the conference expanded to 18 teams. Only 15 teams participated, with the bottom three teams not qualifying. It marked the fourth Big Ten tournament championship for Michigan (their first championship in 1998 was later vacated).

== Seeds ==
The top 15 schools in the Big Ten standings qualified for the tournament. Teams were seeded by conference record, with a tiebreaker system used to seed teams with identical conference records. The top nine teams received a first round bye and the top four teams received a double bye.

| Seed | School | Conference | Tiebreak 1 | Tiebreak 2 | Tiebreak 3 |
|---|---|---|---|---|---|
| 1 | Michigan State | 17–3 | | | |
| 2 | Maryland | 14–6 | 1–0 vs. Michigan | | |
| 3 | Michigan | 14–6 | 0–1 vs. Maryland | | |
| 4 | UCLA | 13–7 | 1–1 vs. Purdue/Wisconsin | 1–0 vs. Michigan State | |
| 5 | Wisconsin | 13–7 | 1–1 vs. Purdue/UCLA | 0–1 vs. Michigan State | 1–0 vs. Purdue |
| 6 | Purdue | 13–7 | 1–1 vs. UCLA/Wisconsin | 0–1 vs. Michigan State | 0–1 vs. Wisconsin |
| 7 | Illinois | 12–8 | 1–0 vs. Oregon | | |
| 8 | Oregon | 12–8 | 0–1 vs. Illinois | | |
| 9 | Indiana | 10–10 | | | |
| 10 | Ohio State | 9–11 | | | |
| 11 | Rutgers | 8–12 | | | |
| 12 | Minnesota | 7–13 | 3–1 vs. NW/USC/Iowa/Nebraska | | |
| 13 | Northwestern | 7–13 | 3–2 vs. Minnesota/USC/Iowa/Nebraska | | |
| 14 | USC | 7–13 | 2–2 vs. Minnesota/NW/Iowa/Nebraska | 1–0 vs. Iowa | |
| 15 | Iowa | 7–13 | 3–3 vs. Minnesota/NW/USC/Nebraska | 0–1 vs. USC | |
| DNQ | Nebraska | 7–13 | 1–4 vs. Minnesota/NW/USC/Iowa | | |
| DNQ | Penn State | 6–14 | | | |
| DNQ | Washington | 4–16 | | | |

== Schedule ==
| Session | Game | Time* | Matchup^{#} | Score | Television | Attendance |
First round – Wednesday, March 12
| 1 | 1 | 3:30 p.m. | No. 13 Northwestern vs. No. 12 Minnesota | 72–64 | Peacock | 12,922 |
| 1 | 2 | 6:00 p.m. | No. 15 Iowa vs. No. 10 Ohio State | 77–70 | Peacock | 12,922 |
| 1 | 3 | 8:30 p.m. | No. 14 USC vs. No. 11 Rutgers | 97–89 ^{2OT} | Peacock | 12,922 |
Second round – Thursday, March 13
| 2 | 4 | 12:00 p.m. | No. 9 Indiana vs. No. 8 Oregon | 59–72 | BTN | 13,216 |
| 2 | 5 | 2:30 p.m. | No. 13 Northwestern vs. No. 5 Wisconsin | 63–70 | BTN | 13,216 |
| 3 | 6 | 6:30 p.m. | No. 15 Iowa vs. No. 7 Illinois | 94–106 | BTN | 13,411 |
| 3 | 7 | 9:00 p.m. | No. 14 USC vs. No. 6 Purdue | 71–76 | BTN | 13,411 |
Quarterfinals – Friday, March 14
| 4 | 8 | 12:00 p.m. | No. 8 Oregon vs. No. 1 Michigan State | 64–74 | BTN | 13,298 |
| 4 | 9 | 2:42 p.m. | No. 5 Wisconsin vs. No. 4 UCLA | 86–70 | BTN | 13,298 |
| 5 | 10 | 6:30 p.m. | No. 7 Illinois vs. No. 2 Maryland | 65–88 | BTN | 13,951 |
| 5 | 11 | 9:00 p.m. | No. 6 Purdue vs. No. 3 Michigan | 68–86 | BTN | 13,951 |
Semifinals – Saturday, March 15
| 6 | 12 | 1:00 p.m. | No. 5 Wisconsin vs. No. 1 Michigan State | 77–74 | CBS | 13,612 |
| 6 | 13 | 3:30 p.m. | No. 3 Michigan vs. No. 2 Maryland | 81–80 | CBS | 13,612 |
Championship – Sunday, March 16
| 7 | 14 | 3:30 p.m. | No. 5 Wisconsin vs. No. 3 Michigan | 53–59 | CBS | 13,824 |

*Game times in EDT. #Rankings denote tournament seeding.

== Bracket ==
First round Wednesday, March 12; Peacock
12 | Minnesota | 64
13 | Northwestern | 72
10 | Ohio State | 70
15 | Iowa | 77
11 | Rutgers | 89
14 | USC | 97^{2OT}

Second round Thursday, March 13; BTN
8 | Oregon | 72
9 | Indiana | 59
5 | Wisconsin | 70
13 | Northwestern | 63
7 | Illinois | 106
15 | Iowa | 94
6 | Purdue | 76
14 | USC | 71

Quarterfinals; Friday, March 14; BTN
1 | Michigan State | 74
8 | Oregon | 64
4 | UCLA | 70
5 | Wisconsin | 86
2 | Maryland | 88
7 | Illinois | 65
3 | Michigan | 86
6 | Purdue | 68

Semifinals; Saturday, March 15; CBS
1 | Michigan State | 74
5 | Wisconsin | 77
2 | Maryland | 80
3 | Michigan | 81

Championship; Sunday, March 16; CBS
5 | Wisconsin | 53
3 | Michigan | 59

== Game summaries ==
=== First round ===
Peacock

March 12
3:30 pm

No. 13 Northwestern 72, No. 12 Minnesota 64
Scoring by half: 32–29, 40–35
| Pts: Nick Martinelli, 28; Rebs: Tied, 7 Asts: Tied, 4 | Pts: Dawson Garcia, 22; Rebs: Tied, 7 Asts: Femi Odukale, 4 |

Gainbridge Fieldhouse
Indianapolis, IN
Attendance: 12,922
Referees: Tim Comer, Michael Reed, Larry Scirotto

Peacock

March 12
6:00 pm

No. 15 Iowa 77, No. 10 Ohio State 70
Scoring by half: 37–37, 40–33
| Pts: Payton Sandfort, 17; Rebs: Ladji Dembele, 9 Asts: Josh Dix, 4 | Pts: Bruce Thornton, 24; Rebs: Devin Royal, 6 Asts: Bruce Thornton, 9 |

Gainbridge Fieldhouse
Indianapolis, IN
Attendance: 12,922
Referees: Brian Dorsey, DJ Carstensen, Earl Walton

Peacock

March 12
8:30 pm

No. 14 USC 97, No. 11 Rutgers 89 (OT)
Scoring by half: 41–30, 32–43 Overtime: 8–8, 16-8
| Pts: Desmond Claude, 28; Rebs: Rashaun Agee, 11; Asts: Desmond Claude, 8 | Pts: Dylan Harper, 27; Rebs: Dylan Harper, 8 Asts: Dylan Harper, 8 |

Gainbridge Fieldhouse
Indianapolis, IN
Attendance: 12,922
Referees: Randy Richardson, Keith Kimble, Paul Szelc

=== Second round ===
BTN

March 13
12:00 pm

No. 9 Indiana 59, No. 8 Oregon 72
Scoring by half: 29−37, 30−35
| Pts: Malik Reneau, 19; Rebs: Tied, 8 Asts: Trey Galloway, 9 | Pts: Jackson Shelstad, 18; Rebs: Nate Bittle, 8 Asts: Nate Bittle, 6 |

Gainbridge Fieldhouse
Indianapolis, IN
Referees: Jeffrey Anderson, Michael Reed, Kelly Pfeiffer

BTN

March 13
2:30 pm

No. 13 Northwestern 63, No. 5 Wisconsin 70
Scoring by half: 30-37, 33-33
| Pts: Nick Martinelli, 22; Rebs: Tied, 7 Asts: K.J. Windham, 5 | Pts: Tied, 18; Rebs: Tied, 7 Asts: Steven Crowl, 3 |

Gainbridge Fieldhouse
Indianapolis, IN
Attendance: 13,216
Referees: Earl Walton, Keith Kimble, John Floyd

BTN

March 13
6:30 pm

No. 15 Iowa 94, No. 7 Illinois 106
Scoring by half: 45–49, 49–57
| Pts: Payton Sandfort, 30; Rebs: Tied, 4 Asts: Drew Thelwell, 6 | Pts: Kylan Boswell, 24; Rebs: Tomislav Ivišić, 10; Asts: Kylan Boswell, 7 |

Gainbridge Fieldhouse
Indianapolis, IN
Attendance: 13,411
Referees: Larry Scirotto, Brian Dorsey, Randy Richardson

BTN

March 13
9:00 pm

No. 14 USC 71, No. 6 Purdue 76
Scoring by half: 35–35, 36–41
| Pts: Desmond Claude, 18; Rebs: Tied, 7 Asts: Saint Thomas, 4 | Pts: Trey Kaufman-Renn, 30; Rebs: Camden Heide, 11; Asts: Braden Smith, 9 |

Gainbridge Fieldhouse
Indianapolis, IN
Attendance: 13,411
Referees: Paul Szelc, D.J. Carstensen, Tim Comer

=== Quarterfinals ===
BTN

March 14
12:00 pm

No. 8 Oregon 64, No. 1 Michigan State 74
Scoring by half: 32–32, 32–42
| Pts: Nate Bittle, 22; Rebs: Nate Bittle, 14; Asts: TJ Bamba, 5 | Pts: Jase Richardson, 17; Rebs: Coen Carr, 8 Asts: Jeremy Fears Jr., 5 |

Gainbridge Fieldhouse
Indianapolis, IN
Attendance: 13,298
Referees: Jeff Anderson, Randy Richardson, Larry Scirotto

BTN

March 14
2:30 pm

No. 5 Wisconsin 86, No. 4 UCLA 70
Scoring by half: 48–29, 38–41
| Pts: John Tonje, 26; Rebs: John Tonje, 9 Asts: Tied, 4 | Pts: Sebastian Mack, 18; Rebs: Tyler Bilodeau, 9 Asts: Tied, 2 |

Gainbridge Fieldhouse
Indianapolis, IN
Attendance: 13,298
Referees: Keith Kimble, Tim Comer, Andy O'Brien

BTN

March 14
6:30 pm

No. 7 Illinois 65, No. 2 Maryland 88
Scoring by half: 31–57, 34–31
| Pts: Tied, 15; Rebs: Kasparas Jakučionis, 10; Asts: Kasparas Jakučionis, 4 | Pts: Rodney Rice, 26; Rebs: Derik Queen, 10; Asts: Ja'Kobi Gillespie, 9 |

Gainbridge Fieldhouse
Indianapolis, IN
Attendance: 13,951
Referees: Paul Szelc, D.J. Carstensen, Edwin Young

BTN

March 14
9:00 pm

No. 6 Purdue 68, No. 3 Michigan 86
Scoring by half: 36–40, 32–46
| Pts: Trey Kaufman-Renn, 24; Rebs: Trey Kaufman-Renn, 9 Asts: Braden Smith, 6 | Pts: Danny Wolf, 18; Rebs: Danny Wolf, 11; Asts: Danny Wolf, 6 |

Gainbridge Fieldhouse
Indianapolis, IN
Attendance: 13,951
Referees: Brian Dorsey, Kelly Pfeifer, John Floyd

=== Semifinals ===
CBS

March 15
1:00 pm

No. 5 Wisconsin 77, No. 1 Michigan State 74
Scoring by half: 37–33, 40–41
| Pts: John Tonje, 32; Rebs: Steven Crowl, 8 Asts: Carter Gilmore, 5 | Pts: Jase Richardson, 21; Rebs: Carson Cooper, 10; Asts: Jeremy Fears Jr., 6 |

Gainbridge Fieldhouse
Indianapolis, IN
Attendance: 13,612
Referees: Keith Kimble, Brian Dorsey, Randy Richardson

CBS

March 15
3:30 pm

No. 3 Michigan 81, No. 2 Maryland 80
Scoring by half: 38–34, 43–46
| Pts: Vladislav Goldin, 25; Rebs: Danny Wolf, 14; Asts: Tre Donaldson, 9 | Pts: Derik Queen, 31; Rebs: Julian Reese, 5 Asts: Ja'Kobi Gillespie, 9 |

Gainbridge Fieldhouse
Indianapolis, IN
Attendance: 13,612
Referees: Jeff Anderson, D.J. Carstensen, Larry Scirotto

=== Championship ===
CBS

March 16
3:30 pm

No. 5 Wisconsin 53, No. 3 Michigan 59
Scoring by half: 23–21, 30–38
| Pts: John Blackwell, 18; Rebs: Tied, 7 Asts: Max Klesmit, 3 | Pts: Tied, 11; Rebs: Danny Wolf, 8 Asts: Tre Donaldson, 8 |

Gainbridge Fieldhouse
Indianapolis, IN
Attendance: 13,824
Referees: Keith Kimble, Brian Dorsey, Jeff Anderson

== All-Tournament Team ==
The following players were recognized for the All-Tournament Team.

Most Outstanding Player
Vladislav Goldin, C, Michigan
All-Tournament Team
Derik Queen, C, Maryland
Vladislav Goldin, C, Michigan
Danny Wolf, F/C, Michigan
John Blackwell, G, Wisconsin
John Tonje, G, Wisconsin
