= 2024–25 Rutgers Scarlet Knights men's basketball team =

2024–25 Rutgers Scarlet Knights men's basketball
- Conference: Big Ten Conference
- Record: 15–17 (8–12 Big Ten)
- Head coach: Steve Pikiell (9th season)
- Associate head coach: Brandin Knight
- Assistant coaches: T. J. Thompson; Marlon Williamson; Jay Young; Steve Hayn
- Home arena: Jersey Mike's Arena

2024–25 Big Ten Conference men's basketball standings
	Conf.				Overall
Team	W		L	PCT	W		L	PCT
No. 7 Michigan State	17	–	3	.850	30	–	7	.811
No. 9 Maryland	14	–	6	.700	27	–	9	.750
No. 10 Michigan †	14	–	6	.700	27	–	10	.730
UCLA	13	–	7	.650	23	–	11	.676
No. 16 Wisconsin	13	–	7	.650	27	–	10	.730
No. 14 Purdue	13	–	7	.650	24	–	12	.667
Illinois	12	–	8	.600	22	–	13	.629
Oregon	12	–	8	.600	25	–	10	.714
Indiana	10	–	10	.500	19	–	13	.594
Ohio State	9	–	11	.450	17	–	15	.531
Rutgers	8	–	12	.400	15	–	17	.469
Minnesota	7	–	13	.350	15	–	17	.469
Northwestern	7	–	13	.350	17	–	16	.515
USC	7	–	13	.350	17	–	18	.486
Iowa	7	–	13	.350	17	–	16	.515
Nebraska	7	–	13	.350	21	–	14	.600
Penn State	6	–	14	.300	16	–	15	.516
Washington	4	–	16	.200	13	–	18	.419
† 2025 Big Ten tournament winner Rankings from AP poll

The 2024–25 Rutgers Scarlet Knights men's basketball team represented Rutgers University–New Brunswick during the 2024–25 NCAA Division I men's basketball season. The Scarlet Knights were led by ninth-year head coach Steve Pikiell and played their home games at Jersey Mike's Arena in Piscataway, New Jersey as members of the Big Ten Conference. Following the team's loss in the Big Ten Tournament, they announced that they would not play in any postseason tournament.

== Previous season ==
The Scarlet Knights finished the 2023–24 season 15–17, 7–13 in Big Ten play to finish a tie for 12th place. As the No. 13 seed in the Big Ten tournament, they lost to Maryland in the first round.

== Offseason ==
=== Departures ===
Name	Number	Pos.	Height	Weight	Year	Hometown	Reason for departure
Derek Simpson	0	G	6'3"	165	Sophomore	Mount Laurel, NJ	Transferred to Saint Joseph's
Noah Fernandes	2	G	5'11"	180	GS Senior	Mattapoisett, MA	Graduated
Mawot Mag	3	F	6'7"	216	Senior	Melbourne, Australia	Transferred to BYU
Aundre Hyatt	5	F	6'6"	235	(redshirt) Senior	Bronx, NY	Graduated
Aiden Terry	7	G	5'10"	160	Senior	Mount Washington, KY	Walk-on; graduated
Oskar Palmquist	9	F	6'8"	220	(redshirt) Senior	Kinna, Sweden	Graduated/signed to play professionally in Sweden with Borås Basket
Gavin Griffiths	10	G	6'8"	193	Freshman	Simsbury, CT	Transferred to Nebraska
Clifford Omoruyi	11	C	6'11"	240	Senior	Benin City, Nigeria	Transferred to Alabama
Antwone Woolfolk	13	F	6'9"	225	Sophomore	Cleveland, OH	Transferred to Miami (OH)
Jacob Morales	15	G	6'4"	205	Sophomore	Montvale, NJ	Walk-on; not on team roster
Antonio Chol	21	F	6'9"	220	Sophomore	Buffalo, NY	Transferred to Buffalo
Daniel Vessey	23	G	6'3"	190	Freshman	Princeton, NJ	Walk-on; transferred to Columbia
Austin Williams	24	G	6'4"	205	GS Senior	Roseland, NJ	Graduated
Zach Hayn	53	G	6'2"	195	GS Senior	Brooklyn, NY	Walk-on; graduated

=== Incoming transfers ===
Name	Number	Pos.	Height	Weight	Year	Hometown	Previous college
Jordan Derkack	0	G	6'5"	205	Junior	Colonia, NJ	Merrimack
Tyson Acuff	5	G	6'4"	210	Senior	Detroit, MI	Eastern Michigan
PJ Hayes	23	F	6'6"	215	GS Senior	Waconia, MN	San Diego
Zach Martini	99	F	6'7"	235	GS Senior	Warren, New Jersey	Princeton

=== Recruiting classes ===
==== 2024 recruiting class ====
College recruiting information
Name	Hometown	School	Height	Weight	Commit date
Ace Bailey #1 SF	Powder Springs, GA	McEachern High School	6 ft 8 in (2.03 m)	210 lb (95 kg)	Jan 15, 2023
Ace Bailey #1 SF	Recruit ratings: Rivals: 247Sports: ESPN: (97)				
Dylan Harper #3 PG	Ramsey, NJ	Don Bosco High School	6 ft 5 in (1.96 m)	205 lb (93 kg)	Dec 6, 2023
Dylan Harper #3 PG	Recruit ratings: Rivals: 247Sports: ESPN: (96)				
Dylan Grant #18 PF	Warren, MI	Michigan Collegiate High School	6 ft 7 in (2.01 m)	205 lb (93 kg)	Aug 28, 2023
Dylan Grant #18 PF	Recruit ratings: Rivals: 247Sports: ESPN: (82)				
Lathan Sommerville #34 C	Atlanta, GA	The Skill Factory Prep School	6 ft 8 in (2.03 m)	245 lb (111 kg)	Apr 21, 2023
Lathan Sommerville #34 C	Recruit ratings: Rivals: 247Sports: ESPN: (82)				
Bryce Dortch #62 PF	Chestnut Hill, MA	Brimmer & May	6 ft 7 in (2.01 m)	200 lb (91 kg)	Jun 13, 2023
Bryce Dortch #62 PF	Recruit ratings: Rivals: 247Sports: ESPN: (78)				
Overall recruit ranking:
Note: In many cases, Scout, Rivals, 247Sports, On3, and ESPN may conflict in their listings of height and weight.; In these cases, the average was taken. ESPN grades are on a 100-point scale.; Sources: "2024 Team Ranking". Rivals.

== Roster ==
2024–25 Rutgers Scarlet Knights men's basketball team
Players
Coaches

Pos.	#	Name	Height	Weight	Year	Previous school	Hometown
G	0	Jordan Derkack	6 ft 5 in (1.96 m)	205 lb (93 kg)	Jr	Spire Academy; Merrimack	Colonia, NJ
G	1	Jamichael Davis	6 ft 2 in (1.88 m)	175 lb (79 kg)	So	McEachern	Powder Springs, GA
G	2	Dylan Harper	6 ft 6 in (1.98 m)	215 lb (98 kg)	Fr	Don Bosco Prep	Franklin Lakes, NJ
G/F	4	Ace Bailey	6 ft 10 in (2.08 m)	200 lb (91 kg)	Fr	McEachern	Chattanooga, TN
G	5	Tyson Acuff	6 ft 4 in (1.93 m)	210 lb (95 kg)	Sr	Cass Technical; Eastern Michigan	Detroit, MI
G	10	Nate Freisthler (W)	6 ft 9 in (2.06 m)	210 lb (95 kg)	Fr	Pioneer	Ann Arbor, MI
C	21	Emmanuel Ogbole	6 ft 10 in (2.08 m)	270 lb (122 kg)	Jr	Excel Model Secondary School; Monroe College	Aune-Adoka, Nigeria
G/F	23	PJ Hayes	6 ft 6 in (1.98 m)	215 lb (98 kg)	GS	Waconia; San Diego	Waconia, MN
C	24	Lathan Sommerville	6 ft 10 in (2.08 m)	275 lb (125 kg)	Fr	Richwoods	Peoria, IL
G	25	Jeremiah Williams	6 ft 4 in (1.93 m)	200 lb (91 kg)	RS Sr	Simeon Career Academy; Iowa State	Chicago, IL
G	30	Peter Noble (W)	6 ft 3 in (1.91 m)	185 lb (84 kg)	Fr	Christian Brothers Academy	Middletown, NJ
G	44	Max Fradkin (W)	5 ft 11 in (1.8 m)	170 lb (77 kg)	Fr	Taft School	Southbury, CT
F/C	99	Zach Martini	6 ft 8 in (2.03 m)	235 lb (107 kg)	GS	Gill St. Benard's; Princeton	Warren, NJ

Head coach

- Steve Pikiell (Connecticut)

Assistant coach(es)

- Brandin Knight (Pittsburgh)
- T. J. Thompson (George Washington)
- Marlon Williamson (Youngstown State)
- Jay Young (Marist)
- Steve Hayn (Stony Brook)

Legend

- (C) Team captain
- (S) Suspended
- (I) Ineligible
- (W) Walk-on
- Injured
- Current redshirt

Roster

== Schedule and results ==
Date time, TV	Rank^{#}	Opponent^{#}	Result	Record	High points	High rebounds	High assists	Site (attendance) city, state
Exhibition
October 17, 2024*; 6:30 p.m., BTN	No. 25	St. John's	L 85–91		25 – Bailey	7 – Derkack	3 – Derkack	Jersey Mike's Arena (4,240); Piscataway, NJ
Regular season
November 6, 2024*; 6:00 p.m., BTN	No. 25	Wagner	W 75–52	1–0	20 – Harper	8 – Sommerville	5 – Davis	Jersey Mike's Arena (8,000); Piscataway, NJ
November 11, 2024*; 7:00 p.m., B1G+	No. 24	Saint Peter's	W 75–65	2–0	24 – Harper	7 – Hayes IV	4 – Williams	Jersey Mike's Arena (8,000); Piscataway, NJ
November 15, 2024*; 6:30 p.m., BTN	No. 24	Monmouth	W 98–81	3–0	20 – Harper	7 – Sommerville	9 – Derkack	Jersey Mike's Arena (8,000); Piscataway, NJ
November 20, 2024*; 8:00 p.m., Peacock	No. 24	Merrimack	W 74–63	4–0	23 – Bailey	10 – Bailey	6 – Harper	Jersey Mike's Arena (8,000); Piscataway, NJ
November 24, 2024*; 1:00 p.m., CBSSN	No. 24	at Kennesaw State	L 77–79	4–1	21 – Harper	6 – Derkack	9 – Harper	Convocation Center (3,805); Kennesaw, GA
November 26, 2024*; 10:30 p.m., TBS		vs. Notre Dame; Players Era Festival Impact Tournament	W 85–84 ^{OT}	5–1	36 – Harper	7 – Acuff	6 – Harper	MGM Grand Garden Arena (7,602); Paradise, NV
November 27, 2024*; 10:00 p.m., TBS		vs. No. 9 Alabama; Players Era Festival Impact Tournament	L 90–95	5–2	37 – Harper	8 – Ogbole	2 – Tied	MGM Grand Garden Arena; Paradise, NV
November 30, 2024*; 3:30 p.m., TruTV		vs. No. 20 Texas A&M; Players Era Festival 5th place game	L 77–81	5–3	24 – Bailey	10 – Bailey	4 – Derkack	MGM Grand Garden Arena; Paradise, NV
December 7, 2024; 12:00 p.m., FS1		at Ohio State	L 66–80	5–4 (0–1)	18 – Harper	7 – Bailey	4 – Harper	Value City Arena (10,477); Columbus, OH
December 10, 2024; 7:00 p.m., Peacock		Penn State	W 80–76	6–4 (1–1)	24 – Harper	15 – Bailey	5 – Harper	Jersey Mike's Arena (8,000); Piscataway, NJ
December 14, 2024*; 3:00 p.m., FOX		Seton Hall; Garden State Hardwood Classic	W 66–63	7–4	24 – Harper	7 – Tied	2 – Tied	Jersey Mike's Arena (8,000); Piscataway, NJ
December 21, 2024*; 12:00 p.m., FS1		vs. Princeton; Never Forget Tribute Classic/Rivalry	L 82–83	7–5	22 – Harper	12 – Bailey	3 – Tied	Prudential Center (10,148); Newark, NJ
December 30, 2024*; 5:00 p.m., BTN		Columbia	W 91–64	8–5	24 – Bailey	11 – Harper	12 – Harper	Jersey Mike's Arena (8,000); Piscataway, NJ
January 2, 2025; 8:30 p.m., Peacock		at Indiana	L 74–84	8–6 (1–2)	39 – Bailey	8 – Tied	3 – Tied	Simon Skjodt Assembly Hall (13,843); Bloomington, IN
January 6, 2025; 7:00 p.m., FS1		Wisconsin	L 63–75	8–7 (1–3)	17 – Acuff	7 – Bailey	2 – Tied	Jersey Mike's Arena (8,000); Piscataway, NJ
January 9, 2025; 6:00 p.m., FS1		No. 20 Purdue	L 50–68	8–8 (1–4)	17 – Bailey	7 – Bailey	3 – Tied	Jersey Mike's Arena (8,000); Piscataway, NJ
January 13, 2025; 6:30 p.m., FS1		UCLA	W 75–68	9–8 (2–4)	20 – Bailey	10 – Bailey	4 – Harper	Jersey Mike's Arena (8,000); Piscataway, NJ
January 16, 2025; 9:00 p.m., FS1		at Nebraska	W 85–82	10–8 (3–4)	24 – Bailey	11 – Tied	4 – Tied	Pinnacle Bank Arena (13,999); Lincoln, NE
January 20, 2025; 6:30 p.m., Peacock		at Penn State	L 72–80	10–9 (3–5)	30 – Bailey	7 – Tied	3 – Tied	Bryce Jordan Center (7,351); State College, PA
January 25, 2025; 1:30 p.m., CBS		No. 8 Michigan State	L 74–81	10–10 (3–6)	26 – Derkack	9 – Bailey	2 – Williams	Madison Square Garden (17,480); New York, NY
January 29, 2025; 9:00 p.m., BTN		at Northwestern	W 79–72	11–10 (4–6)	37 – Bailey	6 – Tied	8 – Davis	Welsh–Ryan Arena (5,884); Evanston, IL
February 1, 2025; 3:30 p.m., FOX		Michigan	L 63–66	11–11 (4–7)	20 – Davis	6 – Bailey	3 – Tied	Jersey Mike's Arena (8,000); Piscataway, NJ
February 5, 2025; 8:30 p.m., BTN		No. 23 Illinois	W 82–73	12–11 (5–7)	28 – Harper	11 – Bailey	5 – Harper	Jersey Mike's Arena (8,000); Piscataway, NJ
February 9, 2025; 12:00 p.m., BTN		at No. 18 Maryland	L 81–90	12–12 (5–8)	20 – Harper	9 – Sommerville	4 – Harper	Xfinity Center (17,069); College Park, MD
February 12, 2025; 6:30 p.m., BTN		Iowa	L 73–84	12–13 (5–9)	13 – Tied	6 – Williams	5 – Harper	Jersey Mike's Arena (8,000); Piscataway, NJ
February 16, 2025; 7:00 p.m., FS1		at Oregon	L 57–75	12–14 (5–10)	14 – Sommerville	6 – Grant	2 – Williams	Matthew Knight Arena (8,635); Eugene, OR
February 19, 2025; 10:30 p.m., BTN		at Washington	W 89–85 ^{OT}	13–14 (6–10)	34 – Harper	8 – Bailey	3 – Tied	Alaska Airlines Arena (8,036); Seattle, WA
February 23, 2025; 6:00 p.m., FS1		USC	W 95–85	14–14 (7–10)	25 – Harper	5 – Martini	9 – Harper	Jersey Mike's Arena (8,000); Piscataway, NJ
February 27, 2025; 9:00 p.m., Peacock		at No. 15 Michigan	L 82–84	14–15 (7–11)	17 – Tied	9 – Bailey	3 – Bailey	Crisler Center (12,053); Ann Arbor, MI
March 4, 2025; 7:00 p.m., Peacock		at No. 18 Purdue	L 71–100	14–16 (7–12)	13 – Harper	5 – Martini	3 – Acuff	Mackey Arena (14,876); West Lafayette, IN
March 9, 2025; 1:00 p.m., BTN		Minnesota	W 75–67	15–16 (8–12)	22 – Harper	9 – Bailey	2 – Tied	Jersey Mike's Arena (8,000); Piscataway, NJ
Big Ten tournament
March 12, 2025; 8:30 p.m., Peacock	(11)	vs. (14) USC; First round	L 89–97 ^{2OT}	15–17	27 – Harper	8 – Harper	8 – Harper	Gainbridge Fieldhouse (12,922); Indianapolis, IN
*Non-conference game. ^{#}Rankings from AP Poll. (#) Tournament seedings in parentheses. All times are in Eastern Time.

== Rankings ==
Ranking movements Legend: ██ Increase in ranking ██ Decrease in ranking — = Not ranked RV = Received votes
	Week																				
Poll	Pre	1	2	3	4	5	6	7	8	9	10	11	12	13	14	15	16	17	18	19	Final
AP	25	24	24	—	—	—	—	—	—	—	—	—	—	—	—	—	—	—	—	—	—
Coaches	RV	24	RV	RV	—	—	—	—	—	—	—	—	—	—	—	—	—	—	—	—	—
