= 2024–25 Oregon Ducks men's basketball team =

American college basketball season

2024–25 Oregon Ducks men's basketball

Players Era Festival champions

NCAA tournament, Second round
- Conference: Big Ten Conference
- Record: 25–10 (12–8 Big Ten)
- Head coach: Dana Altman (15th season)
- Assistant coaches: Tony Stubblefield; Mike Mennenga; Brian Fish; Louis Rowe
- Home arena: Matthew Knight Arena

2024–25 Big Ten Conference men's basketball standings
	Conf.				Overall
Team	W		L	PCT	W		L	PCT
No. 7 Michigan State	17	–	3	.850	30	–	7	.811
No. 9 Maryland	14	–	6	.700	27	–	9	.750
No. 10 Michigan †	14	–	6	.700	27	–	10	.730
UCLA	13	–	7	.650	23	–	11	.676
No. 16 Wisconsin	13	–	7	.650	27	–	10	.730
No. 14 Purdue	13	–	7	.650	24	–	12	.667
Illinois	12	–	8	.600	22	–	13	.629
Oregon	12	–	8	.600	25	–	10	.714
Indiana	10	–	10	.500	19	–	13	.594
Ohio State	9	–	11	.450	17	–	15	.531
Rutgers	8	–	12	.400	15	–	17	.469
Minnesota	7	–	13	.350	15	–	17	.469
Northwestern	7	–	13	.350	17	–	16	.515
USC	7	–	13	.350	17	–	18	.486
Iowa	7	–	13	.350	17	–	16	.515
Nebraska	7	–	13	.350	21	–	14	.600
Penn State	6	–	14	.300	16	–	15	.516
Washington	4	–	16	.200	13	–	18	.419
† 2025 Big Ten tournament winner Rankings from AP poll

The 2024–25 Oregon Ducks men's basketball team represented the University of Oregon during the 2024–25 NCAA Division I men's basketball season. The Ducks were led by 15th-year head coach Dana Altman and played their home games at Matthew Knight Arena as first-year members of the Big Ten Conference.

== Previous season ==
The Ducks finished the 2023–24 season 24–12, 12–8 in Pac-12 play to finish in fourth place. They defeated UCLA, Arizona, and Colorado to win the Pac-12 tournament. As a result, they received the conference's automatic bid to the NCAA tournament as a No. 11 seed in the Midwest Region. There, they beat No. 6-seeded South Carolina before losing to No. 3-seeded Creighton in the second round.

The season marked the Ducks' final season as members of the Pac-12 conference, as they joined the Big Ten Conference on August 1, 2024.

== Offseason ==
=== Departures ===
Oregon departures
Name	Number	Pos.	Height	Weight	Year	Hometown	Reason for departure
Kario Oquendo	0	G	6'4"	210	Senior	Titusville, FL	Graduate transferred to SMU
N'Faly Dante	1	C	6'11"	230	GS senior	Bamako, Mali	Graduated/undrafted in 2024 NBA draft; signed with the Houston Rockets
Jesse Zarzuela	2	G	6'3"	170	Senior	Houston, TX	Graduated
Brennan Rigsby	4	G/F	6'5"	195	Junior	De Beque, CO	Transferred to Minnesota
Jermaine Couisnard	5	G/F	6'4"	210	GS senior	East Chicago, IN	Graduated
Jack Farnham	13	G	6'1"	160	Freshman	Los Angeles, CA	Walk-on; not on team roster
Gabe Reichle	23	G	6'2"	185	Junior	Wilsonville, OR	Walk-on; not on team roster
Mahamdou Diawara	24	F	6'10"	250	Senior	Bamako, Mali	Graduated

=== Incoming transfers ===
Oregon incoming transfers
Name	Number	Pos.	Height	Weight	Year	Hometown	Previous school
Ra'Heim Moss	0	G	6'4"	205	Senior	Springfield, OH	Toledo
Dezdrick Lindsay	4	F	6'6"	195	Junior	Louisville, KY	Florida SouthWestern State College
TJ Bamba	5	G	6'5"	215	GS senior	Bronx, NY	Villanova
Supreme Cook	7	F	6'9"	229	GS senior	East Orange, NJ	Georgetown
Jayson Williams-Johnson	14	G	6'0"	170	Senior	Scotch Plains, NJ	Muhlenberg College
Brandon Angel	21	F	6'8"	235	GS senior	San Diego, CA	Stanford
Drew Carter	22	G	6'3"	200	Junior	Portland, OR	UC Davis

=== 2024 recruiting class ===
College recruiting
Name	Hometown	School	Height	Weight	Commit date
Jamari Phillips #5 PG	Chandler, AZ	Dream City Christian	6 ft 2 in (1.88 m)	193 lb (88 kg)	Jun 8, 2024
Jamari Phillips #5 PG	Recruit ratings: Rivals: 247Sports: ESPN: (87)				
Ibrahima Traore #36 PF	Bel Aire, KS	Sunrise Christian Academy	6 ft 9 in (2.06 m)	212 lb (96 kg)	Oct 8, 2023
Ibrahima Traore #36 PF	Recruit ratings: Rivals: 247Sports: ESPN: (78)				
Overall recruit ranking: Rivals: 7 247Sports: 8
Note: In many cases, Scout, Rivals, 247Sports, On3, and ESPN may conflict in their listings of height and weight.; In these cases, the average was taken. ESPN grades are on a 100-point scale.; Sources:

== Roster ==
2024–25 Oregon Ducks men's basketball team
Players
Coaches

Pos.	#	Name	Height	Weight	Year	Previous school	Hometown
G	0	Ra’Heim Moss	6 ft 4 in (1.93 m)	205 lb (93 kg)	Sr	Toledo	Springfield, Ohio
G/F	2	Jadrian Tracey	6 ft 5 in (1.96 m)	210 lb (95 kg)	RS Sr	Florida SouthWestern State College	Fort Myers, Florida
G	3	Jackson Shelstad	6 ft 0 in (1.83 m)	170 lb (77 kg)	So	West Linn High School	West Linn, Oregon
F	4	Dezdrick Lindsay	6 ft 6 in (1.98 m)	200 lb (91 kg)	Jr	Florida SouthWestern State College	Louisville, Kentucky
G	5	TJ Bamba	6 ft 5 in (1.96 m)	210 lb (95 kg)	GS	Villanova	The Bronx, New York
F	7	Supreme Cook	6 ft 9 in (2.06 m)	200 lb (91 kg)	GS	Georgetown	East Orange, New Jersey
G	9	Keeshawn Barthelemy	6 ft 2 in (1.88 m)	180 lb (82 kg)	GS	Colorado	Montreal, Quebec
F/C	10	Kwame Evans	6 ft 9 in (2.06 m)	220 lb (100 kg)	So	Montverde Academy	Baltimore, Maryland
F	11	Mookie Cook	6 ft 6 in (1.98 m)	210 lb (95 kg)	So	Compass Prep	Portland, Oregon
F	12	James Cooper (W)	6 ft 7 in (2.01 m)	215 lb (98 kg)	So	Mauldin HS	Mauldin, South Carolina
G	14	Jayson Williams-Johnson	6 ft 0 in (1.83 m)	165 lb (75 kg)	Sr	Muhlenberg College	Scotch Plains, New Jersey
G	15	Andre Warren (W)	6 ft 3 in (1.91 m)	175 lb (79 kg)	Jr	Lincoln HS	Stockton, California
F	21	Brandon Angel	6 ft 8 in (2.03 m)	205 lb (93 kg)	GS	Stanford	San Diego, California
G	22	Drew Carter	6 ft 3 in (1.91 m)	200 lb (91 kg)	Jr	UC Davis	Portland, Oregon
G	24	Jamari Phillips	6 ft 3 in (1.91 m)	190 lb (86 kg)	Fr	Dream City Christian (AZ)	Modesto, California
C	32	Nathan Bittle	7 ft 0 in (2.13 m)	215 lb (98 kg)	Jr	Prolific Prep	Central Point, Oregon

Head coach

- Dana Altman (Eastern New Mexico)

Assistant coach(es)

- Tony Stubblefield (Omaha)
- Mike Mennenga (Morehead State)
- Brian Fish (Marshall)
- Louis Rowe (James Madison)

Legend

- (C) Team captain
- (S) Suspended
- (I) Ineligible
- (W) Walk-on
- Injured
- Current redshirt

Roster

== Schedule and results ==
Date time, TV	Rank^{#}	Opponent^{#}	Result	Record	High points	High rebounds	High assists	Site (attendance) city, state
Regular season
November 4, 2024*; 7:30 p.m., B1G+		UC Riverside	W 91–76	1–0	23 – Evans Jr.	11 – Bittle	4 – Moss	Matthew Knight Arena (5,494); Eugene, OR
November 8, 2024*; 7:00 p.m., BTN		Montana	W 79–48	2–0	14 – Pridgen	9 – Pridgen	2 – Johnson	Matthew Knight Arena (6,577); Eugene, OR
November 12, 2024*; 8:00 p.m., BTN		Portland	W 80–70 ^{OT}	3–0	19 – Tracey	10 – Shelstad	5 – Shelstad	Matthew Knight Arena (5,260); Eugene, OR
November 17, 2024*; 2:00 p.m., B1G+		Troy	W 82–61	4–0	15 – Barthelemy	8 – Bittle	6 – Shelstad	Matthew Knight Arena (5,394); Eugene, OR
November 21, 2024*; 7:00 p.m., ESPN+		at Oregon State; Rivalry	W 78–75	5–0	23 – Bittle	14 – Bittle	6 – Shelstad	Gill Coliseum (6,617); Corvallis, OR
November 26, 2024*; 1:30 p.m., TNT		vs. No. 20 Texas A&M; Players Era Festival Power Tournament	W 80–70	6–0	18 – Bamba	6 – Tied	4 – Tracey	MGM Grand Garden Arena (7,602); Paradise, NV
November 27, 2024*; 1:30 p.m., Max		vs. San Diego State; Players Era Festival Power Tournament	W 78–68	7–0	22 – Bamba	9 – Bittle	5 – Bamba	MGM Grand Garden Arena; Paradise, NV
November 30, 2024*; 6:30 p.m., TNT/TruTV		vs. No. 9 Alabama; Players Era Festival Championship	W 83–81	8–0	22 – Barthelemy	9 – Bittle	4 – Tied	MGM Grand Garden Arena; Paradise, NV
December 4, 2024; 7:30 p.m., BTN	No. 12	at USC	W 68–60	9–0 (1–0)	24 – Shelstad	7 – Angel	5 – Barthelemy	Galen Center (4,460); Los Angeles, CA
December 8, 2024; 3:00 p.m., BTN	No. 12	UCLA	L 71–73	9–1 (1–1)	22 – Bittle	10 – Bittle	4 – Bittle	Matthew Knight Arena (8,133); Eugene, OR
December 15, 2024*; 3:00 p.m., BTN	No. 12	Stephen F. Austin	W 79–61	10–1	15 – Angel	7 – Tracey	4 – Barthelemy	Matthew Knight Arena (5,792); Eugene, OR
December 21, 2024*; 5:00 p.m., BTN	No. 10	vs. Stanford; San Jose Tip-Off	W 76–61	11–1	13 – Evans Jr.	9 – Bittle	2 – Tied	SAP Center; San Jose, CA
December 29, 2024*; 2:00 p.m., B1G+	No. 9	Weber State	W 89–49	12–1	16 – Shelstad	7 – Tied	3 – Tied	Matthew Knight Arena (7,320); Eugene, OR
January 2, 2025; 7:00 p.m., FS1	No. 9	No. 22 Illinois	L 77–109	12–2 (1–2)	20 – S. Cook	6 – Tracey	4 – Barthelemy	Matthew Knight Arena (7,010); Eugene, OR
January 5, 2025; 1:00 p.m., Peacock	No. 9	Maryland	W 83–79	13–2 (2–2)	23 – Shelstad	7 – Evans Jr.	5 – Barthelemy	Matthew Knight Arena (7,427); Eugene, OR
January 9, 2025; 3:00 p.m., BTN	No. 15	at Ohio State	W 73–71	14–2 (3–2)	24 – Shelstad	8 – Bittle	3 – Shelstad	Value City Arena (10,631); Columbus, OH
January 12, 2025; 1:00 p.m., BTN	No. 15	at Penn State	W 82–81	15–2 (4–2)	17 – Shelstad	6 – Barthelemy	8 – Shelstad	Bryce Jordan Center (8,972); State College, PA
January 18, 2025; 12:00 p.m., NBC	No. 13	No. 17 Purdue	L 58–65	15–3 (4–3)	23 – Kaufman-Renn	11 – Kaufman-Renn	7 – Smith	Matthew Knight Arena (12,364); Eugene, OR
January 21, 2025; 8:00 p.m., BTN	No. 15	Washington	W 82–71	16–3 (5–3)	21 – Bamba	11 – Bittle	3 – Tied	Matthew Knight Arena (7,083); Eugene, OR
January 25, 2025; 1:00 p.m., BTN	No. 15	at Minnesota	L 69–77	16–4 (5–4)	18 – Angel	5 – Angel	4 – Bamba	Williams Arena (11,062); Minneapolis, MN
January 30, 2025; 7:30 p.m., FS1	No. 16	at UCLA	L 52–78	16–5 (5–5)	13 – Bittle	5 – Bittle	3 – Tied	Pauley Pavilion (9,288); Los Angeles, CA
February 2, 2025; 4:30 p.m., BTN	No. 16	Nebraska	L 71–77	16–6 (5–6)	16 – Shelstad	6 – Bamba	3 – Tied	Matthew Knight Arena (7,848); Eugene, OR
February 5, 2025; 3:30 p.m., BTN		at No. 24 Michigan	L 76–80	16–7 (5–7)	18 – Shelstad	10 – Bamba	6 – Barthelemy	Crisler Center (11,814); Ann Arbor, MI
February 8, 2025; 9:00 a.m., FOX		at No. 9 Michigan State	L 74–86	16–8 (5–8)	22 – Shelstad	7 – Evans Jr.	6 – Bamba	Breslin Center (14,797); East Lansing, MI
February 11, 2025; 8:00 p.m., BTN		Northwestern	W 81–75	17–8 (6–8)	26 – Shelstad	7 – Bittle	4 – Shelstad	Matthew Knight Arena (6,039); Eugene, OR
February 16, 2025; 4:00 p.m., FS1		Rutgers	W 75–57	18–8 (7–8)	19 – Shelstad	10 – Bittle	6 – Bamba	Matthew Knight Arena (8,635); Eugene, OR
February 19, 2025; 5:30 p.m., BTN		at Iowa	W 80–78	19–8 (8–8)	21 – Bittle	10 – Bittle	6 – Bamba	Carver–Hawkeye Arena (8,728); Iowa City, IA
February 22, 2025; 9:00 a.m., FOX		at No. 11 Wisconsin	W 77–73 ^{OT}	20–8 (9–8)	23 – Bittle	9 – Evans Jr.	2 – Tied	Kohl Center (16,838); Madison, WI
March 1, 2025; 1:00 p.m., BTN		USC	W 82–61	21–8 (10–8)	20 – Barthelemy	7 – Bittle	4 – Tied	Matthew Knight Arena (10,257); Eugene, OR
March 4, 2025; 6:00 p.m., FS1		Indiana	W 73–64	22–8 (11–8)	17 – Shelstad	8 – Angel	6 – Bittle	Matthew Knight Arena (9,584); Eugene, OR
March 9, 2025; 12:00 p.m., BTN		at Washington	W 80–73 ^{OT}	23–8 (12–8)	36 – Bittle	12 – Bittle	5 – Shelstad	Alaska Airlines Arena (8,302); Seattle, WA
Big Ten tournament
March 13, 2025; 9:00 a.m., BTN	(8) No. 23	vs. (9) Indiana; Second round	W 72–59	24–8	18 – Shelstad	8 – Bittle	6 – Bittle	Gainbridge Fieldhouse; Indianapolis, IN
March 14, 2025; 9:00 a.m., BTN	(8) No. 23	vs. (1) No. 7 Michigan State; Quarterfinal	L 64–74	24–9	22 – Bittle	11 – Bittle	5 – Bamba	Gainbridge Fieldhouse; Indianapolis, IN
NCAA tournament
March 21, 2025*; 7:10 p.m., TruTV	(5 E) No. 25	vs. (12 E) Liberty; First round	W 81–52	25–9	17 – Shelstad	10 – Bittle	4 – Bamba	Climate Pledge Arena (16,978); Seattle, WA
March 23, 2025*; 6:40 p.m., TBS	(5 E) No. 25	vs. (4 E) No. 21 Arizona; Second round	L 83–87	25–10	25 – Shelstad	10 – Bittle	3 – Tied	Climate Pledge Arena (17,102); Seattle, WA
*Non-conference game. ^{#}Rankings from AP Poll. (#) Tournament seedings in parentheses. E=East. All times are in Pacific Time.

== Rankings ==
Ranking movements Legend: ██ Increase in ranking ██ Decrease in ranking — = Not ranked RV = Received votes
	Week																				
Poll	Pre	1	2	3	4	5	6	7	8	9	10	11	12	13	14	15	16	17	18	19	Final
AP	RV	RV	RV	RV	12	12	10	9	9	15	13	15	16	RV	—	—	RV	RV	23	25	RV
Coaches	RV	RV	RV	RV	10	12	10	9	9	17	14	15	18	RV	RV	—	RV	RV	RV	RV	RV
