= 2024–25 USC Trojans men's basketball team =

American college basketball season

2024–25 USC Trojans men's basketball

College Basketball Crown, Quarterfinals
- Conference: Big Ten Conference
- Record: 17–18 (7–13 Big Ten)
- Head coach: Eric Musselman (1st season)
- Assistant coaches: Will Conroy (1st season); Todd Lee (1st season); Michael Musselman (1st season); Quincy Pondexter (1st season); Anthony Ruta (1st season)
- Home arena: Galen Center (Capacity: 10,258)

2024–25 Big Ten Conference men's basketball standings
| | Conf. | | | | Overall |
| Team | W | | L | PCT | W | | L | PCT |
|---|---|---|---|---|---|---|---|---|
| No. 7 Michigan State | 17 | – | 3 | .850 | 30 | – | 7 | .811 |
| No. 9 Maryland | 14 | – | 6 | .700 | 27 | – | 9 | .750 |
| No. 10 Michigan † | 14 | – | 6 | .700 | 27 | – | 10 | .730 |
| UCLA | 13 | – | 7 | .650 | 23 | – | 11 | .676 |
| No. 16 Wisconsin | 13 | – | 7 | .650 | 27 | – | 10 | .730 |
| No. 14 Purdue | 13 | – | 7 | .650 | 24 | – | 12 | .667 |
| Illinois | 12 | – | 8 | .600 | 22 | – | 13 | .629 |
| Oregon | 12 | – | 8 | .600 | 25 | – | 10 | .714 |
| Indiana | 10 | – | 10 | .500 | 19 | – | 13 | .594 |
| Ohio State | 9 | – | 11 | .450 | 17 | – | 15 | .531 |
| Rutgers | 8 | – | 12 | .400 | 15 | – | 17 | .469 |
| Minnesota | 7 | – | 13 | .350 | 15 | – | 17 | .469 |
| Northwestern | 7 | – | 13 | .350 | 17 | – | 16 | .515 |
| USC | 7 | – | 13 | .350 | 17 | – | 18 | .486 |
| Iowa | 7 | – | 13 | .350 | 17 | – | 16 | .515 |
| Nebraska | 7 | – | 13 | .350 | 21 | – | 14 | .600 |
| Penn State | 6 | – | 14 | .300 | 16 | – | 15 | .516 |
| Washington | 4 | – | 16 | .200 | 13 | – | 18 | .419 |
† 2025 Big Ten tournament winner Rankings from AP poll

The 2024–25 USC Trojans men's basketball team represented the University of Southern California during the 2024–25 NCAA Division I men's basketball season. The Trojans were led by first-year head coach Eric Musselman and played their home games at the Galen Center for the 18th season in Los Angeles, California as first year members of the Big Ten Conference.

== Previous season ==
The Trojans finished the 2023–24 season 15–18, 8–12 in Pac-12 play to finish in a three-way tie for eighth place. As the No. 8 seed in the Pac-12 tournament, they defeated Washington in the first round before losing to Arizona.

On April 1, 2024, head coach Andy Enfield left the school to become the head coach at SMU. On April 5, the school named Arkansas head coach Eric Musselman the team's new head coach.

== Offseason ==
=== Departures ===
| Name | Number | Pos. | Height | Weight | Year | Hometown | Reason for departure |
|---|---|---|---|---|---|---|---|
| Kobe Johnson | 0 | G | 6'6" | 200 | Junior | Milwaukee, WI | Transferred to UCLA |
| Isaiah Collier | 1 | G | 6'5" | 210 | Freshman | Atlanta, GA | Declared for 2024 NBA draft; selected 29th overall by Utah Jazz |
| Vincent Iwuchukwu | 3 | F | 7'1" | 240 | Sophomore | San Antonio, TX | Transferred to St. John's |
| Oziyah Sellers | 4 | G | 6'5" | 185 | Sophomore | Hayward, CA | Transferred to Stanford |
| Boogie Ellis | 5 | G | 6'3" | 190 | GS Senior | San Diego, CA | Graduated/undrafted in 2024 NBA draft; signed with the Sacramento Kings |
| Bronny James | 6 | G | 6'4" | 210 | Freshman | Los Angeles, CA | Declared for 2024 NBA draft; selected 55th overall by Los Angeles Lakers |
| DJ Rodman | 10 | F | 6'6" | 225 | GS Senior | Newport Beach, CA | Graduated |
| Brandon Gardner | 13 | F | 6'8" | 215 | Freshman | Waynesboro, GA | Transferred to Arizona State |
| Zach Brooker | 15 | G | 6'0" | 160 | Senior | Calabasas, CA | Walk-on; graduate transferred |
| Arrinten Page | 22 | F | 6'11" | 245 | Freshman | Atlanta, GA | Transferred to Cincinnati |
| Joshua Morgan | 24 | F | 6'11" | 225 | (redshirt) Senior | Sacramento, CA | Graduated |
| Kijani Wright | 33 | F | 6'9" | 235 | Sophomore | Los Angeles, CA | Transferred to Vanderbilt |

=== Incoming transfers ===
| Name | Number | Pos. | Height | Weight | Year | Hometown | Previous school |
|---|---|---|---|---|---|---|---|
| Saint Thomas | 0 | F | 6'7" | 200 | Senior | Omaha, NE | Northern Colorado |
| Desmond Claude | 1 | G | 6'6" | 203 | Junior | New Haven, CT | Xavier |
| Matt Knowling | 3 | F | 6'6" | 200 | GS Senior | Ellington, CT | Yale |
| Bryce Pope | 4 | G | 6'3" | 185 | GS Senior | San Diego, CA | UC San Diego |
| Terrance Williams II | 5 | F | 6'7" | 225 | GS Senior | Clinton, MD | Michigan |
| Wesley Yates III | 6 | G | 6'4" | 200 | (redshirt) Freshman | Beaumont, TX | Washington |
| Chibuzo Agbo | 7 | G | 6'7" | 226 | GS Senior | San Diego, CA | Boise State |
| Kevin Patton Jr. | 8 | G | 6'8" | 197 | Sophomore | Temecula, CA | San Diego |
| Rashaun Agee | 12 | F | 6'8" | 225 | GS Senior | Chicago, IL | Bowling Green |
| Clark Slajchert | 32 | G | 6'1" | 170 | GS Senior | Los Angeles, CA | Penn |
| Josh Cohen | 33 | F | 6'10" | 220 | GS Senior | Lincroft, NJ | UMass |

=== 2024 recruiting class ===
College recruiting
| Name | Hometown | School | Height | Weight | Commit date |
|---|---|---|---|---|---|
| Jalen Shelley #4 SF | Frisco, TX | Link Academy | 6 ft 7 in (2.01 m) | 185 lb (84 kg) | Apr 26, 2024 |
| Jalen Shelley #4 SF | Recruit ratings: Rivals: 247Sports: ESPN: (87) | | | | |
| Isaiah Elohim #8 SF | Northridge, CA | Sierra Canyon High School | 6 ft 4 in (1.93 m) | 185 lb (84 kg) | Apr 22, 2024 |
| Isaiah Elohim #8 SF | Recruit ratings: Rivals: 247Sports: ESPN: (86) | | | | |
Overall recruit ranking:
Note: In many cases, Scout, Rivals, 247Sports, On3, and ESPN may conflict in their listings of height and weight.; In these cases, the average was taken. ESPN grades are on a 100-point scale.; Sources: "USC 2024 Basketball Commitments". Rivals.; "2024 USC Trojans Recruiting Class". ESPN.; "2024 Team Ranking". Rivals.

== Roster ==
2024–25 USC Trojans men's basketball team
Players
Coaches

| Pos. | # | Name | Height | Weight | Year | Previous school | Hometown |
|---|---|---|---|---|---|---|---|
| F | 0 | Saint Thomas | 6 ft 7 in (2.01 m) | 220 lb (100 kg) | Sr | Millard North; Northern Colorado | Omaha, NE |
| G | 1 | Desmond Claude | 6 ft 6 in (1.98 m) | 205 lb (93 kg) | Jr | Putnam Science Academy; Xavier | New Haven, CT |
| G/F | 2 | Isaiah Elohim | 6 ft 5 in (1.96 m) | 220 lb (100 kg) | Fr | Sierra Canyon | North Hills, CA |
| F | 3 | Matt Knowling | 6 ft 6 in (1.98 m) | 200 lb (91 kg) | GS | East Catholic; Yale | Manchester, CT |
| G | 4 | Bryce Pope | 6 ft 3 in (1.91 m) | 185 lb (84 kg) | GS | Torrey Pines; UC San Diego | San Diego, CA |
| F | 5 | Terrance Williams | 6 ft 7 in (2.01 m) | 225 lb (102 kg) | GS | Gonzaga College; Michigan | Washington, D.C. |
| G | 6 | Wesley Yates III | 6 ft 4 in (1.93 m) | 200 lb (91 kg) | RS Fr | Beaumont United; Washington | Beaumont, TX |
| G | 7 | Chibuzo Agbo | 6 ft 7 in (2.01 m) | 226 lb (103 kg) | GS | St. Augustine; Boise State | San Diego, CA |
| G | 8 | Kevin Patton Jr. | 6 ft 8 in (2.03 m) | 200 lb (91 kg) | So | Rancho Christian School; San Diego | Temecula, CA |
| F | 9 | Jalen Shelley | 6 ft 8 in (2.03 m) | 190 lb (86 kg) | Fr | Link Academy | Little Elm, TX |
| F | 12 | Rashaun Agee | 6 ft 8 in (2.03 m) | 225 lb (102 kg) | GS | Bogan; Bowling Green | Chicago, IL |
| G | 13 | Kallai Patton (W) | 6 ft 4 in (1.93 m) | — | Fr | Rancho Christian School | Murrieta, CA |
| G/F | 14 | Avand Dorian (W) | 6 ft 3 in (1.91 m) | 195 lb (88 kg) | Fr | AGBU MDS | Los Angeles, CA |
| G | 21 | Jonah Goorin (W) | 6 ft 3 in (1.91 m) | 175 lb (79 kg) | Fr | Sacred Heart Cathedral | San Francisco, CA |
| G | 24 | JD Plough (W) | 6 ft 3 in (1.91 m) | 180 lb (82 kg) | GS | Peninsula; Los Angeles Harbor College | Palos Verdes Peninsula, CA |
| F | 30 | Harrison Hornery | 6 ft 10 in (2.08 m) | 230 lb (104 kg) | Sr | Mater Dei | Toowoomba, Australia |
| G | 32 | Clark Slajchert | 6 ft 1 in (1.85 m) | 170 lb (77 kg) | GS | Oak Park; Penn | Los Angeles, CA |
| F | 33 | Josh Cohen | 6 ft 10 in (2.08 m) | 250 lb (113 kg) | GS | Christian Brothers Academy; UMass | Lincroft, NJ |

Head coach

- Eric Musselman (San Diego)

Assistant coach(es)

- Will Conroy (Washington)
- Todd Lee (South Dakota)
- Michael Musselman (San Diego)
- Quincy Pondexter (Washington)
- Anthony Ruta (Arizona State)

Legend

- (C) Team captain
- (S) Suspended
- (I) Ineligible
- (W) Walk-on
- Injured
- Current redshirt

Roster

== Schedule and results ==
| Date time, TV | Rank^{#} | Opponent^{#} | Result | Record | High points | High rebounds | High assists | Site (attendance) city, state |
Exhibition
| October 15, 2024*; 7:00 p.m., B1G+ | | UTSA; Trojan Tipoff Event | W 84–63 | | 21 – Thomas | 6 – Thomas | 5 – Claude | Galen Center; Los Angeles, California |
| October 26, 2024*; 5:00 p.m., B1G+ | | vs. No. 6 Gonzaga; Charity Game to support Eisenhower Health | W 96–93 | | 20 – Williams II | 7 – Agbo | 5 – Tied | Acrisure Arena (2,190); Palm Desert, California |
Regular season
| November 4, 2024*; 7:00 p.m., BTN | | Chattanooga | W 77–51 | 1–0 | 14 – Agbo | 5 – Thomas | 4 – Tied | Galen Center (3,294); Los Angeles, California |
| November 7, 2024*; 7:00 p.m., B1G+ | | Idaho State | W 75–69 | 2–0 | 19 – Cohen | 7 – Thomas | 9 – Thomas | Galen Center (3,731); Los Angeles, California |
| November 13, 2024*; 8:00 p.m., BTN | | UT Arlington | W 98–95 | 3–0 | 26 – Claude | 7 – Thomas | 8 – Claude | Galen Center (2,519); Los Angeles, California |
| November 17, 2024*; 6:30 p.m., BTN | | California | L 66–71 | 3–1 | 20 – Claude | 4 – Claude | 3 – Claude | Galen Center (5,466); Los Angeles, California |
| November 20, 2024*; 7:00 p.m., Peacock | | San José State | W 82–68 | 4–1 | 20 – Tied | 8 – Knowing | 9 – Thomas | Galen Center (3,186); Los Angeles, California |
| November 24, 2024*; 4:00 p.m., B1G+ | | Grambling State; Acrisure Classic Campus Site Game | W 80–69 | 5–1 | 21 – Agbo | 6 – Tied | 5 – Claude | Galen Center (3,068); Los Angeles, California |
| November 28, 2024*; 6:00 p.m., TruTV/Max | | vs. Saint Mary's; Acrisure Classic Semifinals | L 36–71 | 5–2 | 12 – Cohen | 4 – Tied | 3 – Cohen | Acrisure Arena (1,006); Palm Desert, California |
| November 29, 2024*; 9:00 p.m., TruTV/Max | | vs. New Mexico; Acrisure Classic Consolation Game | L 73–83 | 5–3 | 14 – Cohen | 7 – Tied | 5 – Thomas | Acrisure Arena (310); Palm Desert, California |
| December 4, 2024; 7:30 p.m., BTN | | No. 12 Oregon | L 60–68 | 5–4 (0–1) | 22 – Claude | 7 – Thomas | 4 – Claude | Galen Center (4,460); Los Angeles, California |
| December 7, 2024; 3:00 p.m., BTN | | at Washington | W 85–61 | 6–4 (1–1) | 20 – Claude | 7 – Agee | 4 – Tied | Alaska Airlines Arena (7,251); Seattle, Washington |
| December 15, 2024*; 5:00 p.m., BTN | | Montana State | W 89–63 | 7–4 | 19 – Claude | 7 – Thomas | 5 – Slajchert | Galen Center (2,381); Los Angeles, California |
| December 18, 2024*; 7:00 p.m., BTN | | Cal State Northridge | W 90–69 | 8–4 | 23 – Agbo | 7 – Thomas | 9 – Claude | Galen Center (4,039); Los Angeles, California |
| December 22, 2024*; 1:00 p.m., BTN | | Southern | W 82–51 | 9–4 | 18 – Agbo | 8 – Thomas | 7 – Thomas | Galen Center (4,127); Los Angeles, California |
| January 4, 2025; 5:00 p.m., FOX | | Michigan | L 74–85 | 9–5 (1–2) | 19 – Tied | 7 – Claude | 6 – Cohen | Galen Center (7,075); Los Angeles, California |
| January 8, 2025; 4:00 p.m., BTN | | at Indiana | L 69–82 | 9–6 (1–3) | 18 – Yates III | 8 – Agbo | 5 – Agbo | Simon Skjodt Assembly Hall (13,022); Bloomington, Indiana |
| January 11, 2025; 9:00 a.m., BTN | | at No. 13 Illinois | W 82–72 | 10–6 (2–3) | 31 – Claude | 8 – Tied | 3 – Tied | State Farm Center (15,544); Champaign, Illinois |
| January 14, 2025; 7:30 p.m., FS1 | | Iowa | W 98–89 | 11–6 (3–3) | 25 – Claude | 10 – Agee | 9 – Claude | Galen Center (5,246); Los Angeles, California |
| January 18, 2025; 12:00 p.m., BTN | | No. 24 Wisconsin | L 69–84 | 11–7 (3–4) | 19 – Thomas | 10 – Slajchert | 3 – Thomas | Galen Center (6,938); Los Angeles, California |
| January 22, 2025; 6:00 p.m., BTN | | at Nebraska | W 78–73 | 12–7 (4–4) | 21 – Claude | 9 – Agbo | 6 – Claude | Pinnacle Bank Arena (14,492); Lincoln, Nebraska |
| January 27, 2025; 7:00 p.m., FS1 | | UCLA; Rivalry | L 76–82 | 12–8 (4–5) | 21 – Agee | 8 – Thomas | 6 – Tied | Galen Center (7,532); Los Angeles, California |
| February 1, 2025; 1:30 p.m., Peacock | | No. 7 Michigan State | W 70–64 | 13–8 (5–5) | 19 – Claude | 8 – Thomas | 4 – Thomas | Galen Center (8,251); Los Angeles, California |
| February 4, 2025; 6:00 p.m., BTN | | at Northwestern | L 75–77 | 13–9 (5–6) | 24 – Slajchert | 8 – Thomas | 8 – Thomas | Welsh-Ryan Arena (5,440); Evanston, Illinois |
| February 7, 2025; 4:00 p.m., FS1 | | at No. 7 Purdue | L 72–90 | 13–10 (5–7) | 30 – Yates III | 6 – Shelley | 3 – Thomas | Mackey Arena (14,876); West Lafayette, Indiana |
| February 11, 2025; 6:00 p.m., BTN | | Penn State | W 92–67 | 14–10 (6–7) | 21 – Agbo | 5 – Tied | 8 – Claude | Galen Center (4,638); Los Angeles, California |
| February 15, 2025; 1:00 p.m., BTN | | Minnesota | L 66–69 | 14–11 (6–8) | 18 – Tied | 7 – Tied | 5 – Claude | Galen Center (6,426); Los Angeles, California |
| February 20, 2025; 5:30 p.m., FS1 | | at No. 20 Maryland | L 71–88 | 14–12 (6–9) | 21 – Yates III | 8 – Shelley | 5 – Thomas | Xfinity Center (14,662); College Park, Maryland |
| February 23, 2025; 3:00 p.m., FS1 | | at Rutgers | L 85–95 | 14–13 (6–10) | 30 – Claude | 8 – Cohen | 3 – Yates III | Jersey Mike's Arena (8,000); Piscataway, New Jersey |
| February 26, 2025; 7:30 p.m., BTN | | Ohio State | L 82–87 | 14–14 (6–11) | 27 – Yates III | 5 – Thomas | 5 – Thomas | Galen Center (5,720); Los Angeles, California |
| March 1, 2025; 1:00 p.m., BTN | | at Oregon | L 61–82 | 14–15 (6–12) | 29 – Agee | 14 – Agee | 4 – Thomas | Matthew Knight Arena (10,257); Eugene, Oregon |
| March 5, 2025; 7:30 p.m., BTN | | Washington; Senior Night | W 92–61 | 15–15 (7–12) | 26 – Agbo | 6 – Tied | 11 – Claude | Galen Center (5,856); Los Angeles, California |
| March 8, 2025; 5:00 p.m., FOX | | at UCLA; Rivalry | L 63–90 | 15–16 (7–13) | 21 – Yates III | 6 – Tied | 5 – Yates III | Pauley Pavilion (12,018); Los Angeles, California |
Big Ten tournament
| March 12, 2025; 5:30 p.m., Peacock | (14) | vs. (11) Rutgers; First round | W 97–89 ^{2OT} | 16–16 | 28 – Claude | 11 – Agee | 8 – Claude | Gainbridge Fieldhouse (12,922); Indianapolis, Indiana |
| March 13, 2025; 6:00 p.m., BTN | (14) | vs. (6) No. 20 Purdue; Second Round | L 71–76 | 16–17 | 18 – Claude | 7 – Tied | 4 – Thomas | Gainbridge Fieldhouse (13,411); Indianapolis, Indiana |
College Basketball Crown
| April 1, 2025*; 8:00 p.m., FS1 | | vs. Tulane; First round | W 89–60 | 17–17 | 27 – Agee | 9 – Agee | 9 – Thomas | MGM Grand Garden Arena (2,407); Paradise, NV |
| April 3, 2025*; 6:30 p.m., FS1 | | vs. Villanova; Quarterfinals | L 59–60 | 17–18 | 23 – Thomas | 13 – Thomas | 3 – Tied | MGM Grand Garden Arena (2,279); Paradise, NV |
*Non-conference game. ^{#}Rankings from AP Poll. (#) Tournament seedings in parentheses. All times are in Pacific Time.

== Game summaries ==
This section will be filled in as the season progresses.

=== vs. UTSA (Exhibition) ===
BTN+

October 15th, 2024
7:00 p.m. PST

Recap

UTSA Roadrunners 63, USC Trojans 84
Scoring by half: 32-35, 31-49
| Pts: Primo Spears - 14; Rebs: Mo Njie - 6 Asts: Marcus Millender - 4 | Pts: Saint Thomas - 21; Rebs: Saint Thomas - 6 Asts: Desmond Claude - 5 |

Galen Center • Los Angeles, California
Referees: Mchael Reed, Michael Irving, Janetta Graham

=== No. 6 Gonzaga (Exhibition) ===
BTN+

October 15th, 2024
5:00 p.m. PST

Recap

No. 6 Gonzaga Bulldogs 93, USC Trojans 96
Scoring by half: 37-39, 59-54
| Pts: Khalif Battle - 20; Rebs: Michael Ajayi - 6 Asts: Ryan Nembhard - 8 | Pts: Terrance Williams II - 20; Rebs: Chibuzo Agbo - 7 Asts: Tied - 5 |

Acrisure Arena • Palm Desert, California
Attendance: 2,190

=== vs. Chattanooga ===
BTN

November 4th, 2024
7:00 p.m. PST

Recap

Chattanooga Mocs 51, USC Trojans' 77
Scoring by half: 22--32, 29-45
| Pts: Chibuzo Agbo - 14; Rebs: Saint Thomas - 5 Asts: Tied - 4 | Pts: Honor Huff - 17; Rebs: Tied - 5 Asts: Garrison Keeslar - 4 |

Galen Center • Los Angeles, California
Attendance: 3,294
Referees: Randy Richardson, Deldre Carr, Scott Arbogast

=== vs. Idaho State ===
BTN+

November 7th, 2024
7:00 p.m. PST

Recap

Idaho State Bengals 69, USC Trojans 75
Scoring by half: 35-38, 34-37
| Pts: Dyland Darling - 22; Rebs: Evan Otten - 10; Asts: Dylan Darling - 7 | Pts: Josh Cohen - 19; Rebs: Saint Thomas - 7 Asts: Saint Thomas - 9 |

Galen Center • Los Angeles, California
Attendance: 3,731
Referees: Paul Scelz, Keith Kimble, Bianca Burns

=== vs. UT Arlington ===
BTN

November 13th, 2024
8:00 p.m. PST

Recap

UT Arlington Mavericks 95, USC Trojans 98
Scoring by half: 42-51, 53-47
| Pts: Jaden Wells - 27; Rebs: Darius Burford - 7 Asts: Kade Douglas - 8 | Pts: Desmond Claude - 26; Rebs: Saint Thomas - 7 Asts: Desmond Claude - 8 |

Galen Center • Los Angeles, California
Attendance: 2,519
Referees: Daniel Nguyen, D.J. Garstensen, Jeffrey Anderson

=== vs. California ===
BTN

November 17th, 2024
6:30 p.m. PST

Recap

California Golden Bears 71, USC Trojans 66
Scoring by half: 42-43, 29-23
| Pts: Andrej Stojakovic - 20; Rebs: Tied - 7 Asts: Tied - 2 | Pts: Desmond Claude - 20; Rebs: Matt Knowling - 6 Asts: Desmond Claude- 3 |

Galen Center • Los Angeles, California
Attendance: 5,466
Referees: Kevin Brill, Earl Walton, Verne Harris

=== vs. San José State ===
Peacock

November 20th, 2024
7:00 p.m. PST

Recap

San José State Spartans 68, USC Trojans 82
Scoring by half: 35-42, 33-40
| Pts: Josh Uduji - 25; Rebs: Robert Vaihola - 9 Asts: Robert Vaihola - 5 | Pts: Tied - 20; Rebs: Matt Knowling - 8 Asts: Saint Thomas - 9 |

Galen Center • Los Angeles, California
Attendance: 3,186
Referees: Ian Caldwell, Jason Phillips, Brian Borsey

=== vs. Grambling State (Acrisure Classic Campus Site Game) ===
BTN+

November 24th, 2024
4:00 p.m. PST

Recap

Grambling State Tigers 69, USC Trojans 80
Scoring by half: 38-37, 31-43
| Pts: Kintavious Dozier - 17; Rebs: P.J. Eason - 6 Asts: Mikale Stevenson - 10 | Pts: Chibuzo Agbo - 21; Rebs: Tied - 6 Asts: Desmond Claude - 5 |

Galen Center • Los Angeles, California
Attendance: 3,068
Referees: Michael Irving, Michael Reed, Paul Szeic

=== Saint Mary's (Acrisure Classic Semifinals) ===
TruTV/Max

November 28th, 2024
6:00 p.m. PST

Recap

Saint Mary's Gaels 71, USC Trojans 36
Scoring by half: 32-21, 39-15
| Pts: Jordan Ross - 15; Rebs: Tied - 7 Asts: Tied - 4 | Pts: Josh Cohen - 12; Rebs: Chibuzo Agbo - 5 Asts: Josh Cohen - 3 |

Acrisure Arena • Palm Desert, California
Attendance: 1,006
Referees: John Hampton, Michael Greenstein, Gregory Nixon

=== New Mexico (Acrisure Classic Consolation Game) ===
TruTV/Max

November 29th, 2024
9:00 p.m. PST

Recap

USC Trojans 73, New Mexico Lobos 83
Scoring by half: 30-39, '43-44
| Pts: Josh Cohen - 14; Rebs: Tied - 7 Asts: Saint Thomas - 5 | Pts: Tru Washington - 20; Rebs: Tied - 6 Asts: Donovan Dent - 11 |

Acrisure Arena • Palm Desert, California
Attendance: 310
Referees: Bill Vinovich, Michael Greenstein, John Hampton

=== vs No. 12 Oregon ===
BTN

December 4th
7:30 p.m. PST

Recap

No. 12 Oregon Ducks 68, USC Trojans 60
Scoring by half: 23-30, 45-30
| Pts: Jackson Shelstad - 24; Rebs: Brandon Angel - 7 Asts: Keeshawn Barthelemy - 5 | Pts: Desmond Claude - 22; Rebs: Saint Thomas - 7 Asts: Desmond Claude - 4 |

Galen Center • Los Angeles, California
Attendance: 4,460
Referees: Earl Walton, Keith Kimble, Paul Szelc

=== at Washington ===
BTN

December 7th
3:00 p.m. PST

Report

USC Trojans 85, Washington Huskies 61
Scoring by half: 51-25, 34-36
| Pts: Desmond Claude - 20; Rebs: Rashaun Agee - 7 Asts: Tied - 4 | Pts: Mekhi Mason - 15; Rebs: Tyler Harris - 7 Asts: Zoom Diallo - 4 |

Alaska Airlines Arena • Seattle, Washington
Attendance: 7,251
Referees: D.J. Carstensen, Verne Harris, Michael Irving

=== vs Montana State ===
BTN

December 15th
5:00 p.m. PST

Recap

Montana State Bobcats 63, USC Trojans 89
Scoring by half: 21-47, 42-42
| Pts: Brandon Walker - 14; Rebs: Patrick McMahon - 5 Asts: Bryce Zephir - 4 | Pts: Desmond Claude - 19; Rebs: Saint Thomas - 7 Asts: Clark Slajchert - 5 |

Galen Center • Los Angeles, California
Attendance: 4,828
Referees: Jason Phillips, Verne Harris, Randy Richardson

=== vs Cal State Northridge ===
BTN

December 18th
7:00 p.m. PST

Recap

Cal State Northridge Matadors 69, USC Trojans 90
Scoring by half: 39-40, 30-50
| Pts: Tied - 17; Rebs: Keonte Jones - 10; Asts: Keonte Jones - 4 | Pts: Chibuzo Agbo - 23; Rebs: Saint Thomas - 7 Asts: Desmond Claude - 9 |

Galen Center • Los Angeles, California
Attendance: 4,039
Referees: Kelly Pfeifer, Nate Harris, Michael Irving

=== vs Southern ===
BTN

December 22nd
1:00 p.m. PST

Recap

Southern Jaguars 51, USC Trojans 82
Scoring by half: 27-41, 24-41
| Pts: Tied - 10; Rebs: Derrick Tezeno - 5 Asts: Tied - 2 | Pts: Chibuzo Abgo - 18; Rebs: Saint Thomas - 8 Asts: Saint Thomas - 7 |

Galen Center • Los Angeles, California
Attendance: 4,127
Referees: Earl Walton, Tim Comer, Paul Szelc

=== vs Michigan ===
FOX

January 4th
5:00 p.m. PST

Recap

Michigan Wolverines 85, USC Trojans 74
Scoring by half: 42-38, 43-36
| Pts: Danny Wolf - 21; Rebs: Danny Wolf - 13; Asts: Danny Wolf - 7 | Pts: Tied - 19; Rebs: Desmond Claude - 7 Asts: Josh Cohen - 6 |

Galen Center • Los Angeles, California
Attendance: 7,075
Referees: Jason Phillips, Brian Borsey, Verne Harris

=== at Indiana ===
BTN

January 8th
4:00 p.m. PST

Recap

USC Trojans 69, Indiana Hoosiers 82
Scoring by half: 38-38, 31-44
| Pts: Wesley Yates III - 18; Rebs: Chibuzo Agbo - 8 Asts: Chibuzo Agbo - 5 | Pts: Oumar Ballo - 23; Rebs: Myles Rice - 9 Asts: Tied - 6 |

Simon Skjodt Assembly Hall • Bloomington, Indiana
Attendance: 13,022
Referees: Bart Lenox, Doug Sirmons, Paul Szelc

=== at Illinois ===
BTN

January 11th
9:00 a.m. PST

Recap

USC Trojans 82, Illinois Fighting Illini 72
Scoring by half: 35-38, 47-34
| Pts: Desmond Claude - 31; Rebs: Tied - 8 Asts: Tied - 3 | Pts: Ben Humrichous - 15; Rebs: Kylan Boswell - 8 Asts: Kyland Boswell - 6 |

State Farm Center • Champaign, Illinois
Attendance: 15,544
Referees: Verne Harris, D.J. Carstensen, Keith Kimble

=== vs Iowa ===
FS1

January 14th
7:30 p.m. PST

Recap

Iowa Hawkeyes 89, USC Trojans 99
Scoring by half: 32-48, 57-51
| Pts: Owen Freeman - 23; Rebs: Owen Freeman - 6 Asts: Brock Harding - 8 | Pts: Desmond Claude - 25; Rebs: Rashaun Agee - 10; Asts: Desmond Claude - 9 |

Galen Center • Los Angeles, California
Attendance: 5,246
Referees: Jason Phillips, Nate Harris, Larry Scirotto

=== vs Wisconsin ===
BTN

January 18th
12:00 p.m. PST

Recap

No. 24 Wisconsin Badgers 84, USC Trojans 69
Scoring by half: 42-27, 42-42
| Pts: John Blackwell - 28; Rebs: Tied - 5 Asts: Tied - 4 | Pts: Saint Thomas - 19; Rebs: Chibuzo Agbo - 9 Asts: Saint Thomas - 3 |

Galen Center • Los Angeles, California
Attendance: 6,938
Referees: Randy Richardson, Tim Corner, Michael Reed

=== at Nebraska ===
BTN

January 22nd
6:00 p.m. PST

Recap

USC Trojans 78, Nebraska Cornhuskers 73
Scoring by half: 31-33, 47-40
| Pts: Desmond Claude - 21; Rebs: Chibuzo Agbo - 9 Asts: Desmond Claude - 6 | Pts: Juwan Gary - 27; Rebs: Rollie Worster - 6 Asts: Rollie Worster - 6 |

Pinnacle Bank Arena • Lincoln, Nebraska
Attendance: 14,492
Referees: D.J. Carstensen, Earl Walton, Jeffrey Anderson

=== vs UCLA (Rivalry) ===
FS1

January 27nd
7:00 p.m. PST

Recap

UCLA Bruins 82, USC Trojans 76
Scoring by half: 42-37, 40-39
| Pts: Eric Dailey Jr. - 16; Rebs: Aday Mara - 11; Asts: Dylan Andrew - 6 | Pts: Rashaun Agee - 21; Rebs: Saint Thomas - 8 Asts: Tied - 6 |

Galen Center • Los Angeles, California
Attendance: 7,532
Referees: Randy Richardson, Michael Reed, Keith Kimble

=== vs Michigan State ===
Peacock

February 1st
1:30 p.m. PST

No. 7 Michigan State Spartans vs. USC Trojans

Galen Center • Los Angeles, California

=== at Northwestern ===
BTN

February 4th
6:00 p.m. PST

USC Trojans vs. Northwestern Wildcats

Welsh-Ryan Arena • Evanston, Illinois

=== at Purdue ===
FS1

February 7th
4:00 p.m. PST

USC Trojans vs. No. 7 Purdue Boilermakers

Mackey Arena • West Lafayette, Indiana

=== vs Penn State ===
BTN

February 11th
6:00 p.m. PST

Penn State Nittany Lions vs. USC Trojans

Galen Center • Los Angeles, California

=== vs Minnesota ===
BTN

February 15th
1:00 p.m. PST

Minnesota Golden Gophers vs. USC Trojans

Galen Center • Los Angeles, California

=== at Maryland ===
FS1

February 20th
5:30 p.m. PST

USC Trojans vs. No. 20 Maryland Terrapins

Xfinity Center • College Park, Maryland

=== at Rutgers ===
FS1

February 23rd
3:00 p.m. PST

USC Trojans vs. Rutgers Scarlet Knights

Jersey Mike's Arena • Piscataway, New Jersey

=== vs Ohio State ===
BTN

February 26th
7:30 p.m. PST

Ohio State Buckeyes vs. USC Trojans

Galen Center • Los Angeles, California

=== at Oregon ===
BTN

March 1st
1:00 p.m. PST

USC Trojans vs. Oregon Ducks

Matthew Knight Arena • Eugene, Oregon

=== vs Washington (Senior Night) ===
BTN

March 5th
7:30 p.m. PST

Washington Huskies vs. USC Trojans

Galen Center • Los Angeles, California

=== at UCLA (Rivalry) ===
FOX

March 8th
5:00 p.m. PST

USC Trojans vs. UCLA Bruins

Pauley Pavilion • Los Angeles, California

=== First Round: (11) Rutgers ===
Peacock

March 12th
5:30 p.m. PST

Recap

(14) USC Trojans 97, (11) Rutgers Scarlet Knights 89 (OT)
Scoring by half: 41-30, 32-43 Overtime: 24-16 (OT: 8-8; 2OT: 16-8)
| Pts: Desmond Claude - 28; Rebs: Rashaun Agee - 11; Asts: Desmond Claude - 8 | Pts: Dylan Harper - 27; Rebs: Dylan Harper - 8 Asts: Dylan Harper - 9 |

Gainbridge Fieldhouse • Indianapolis, Indiana
Attendance: 12,922
Referees: Randy Richardson, Keith Kimble, Paul Szelc

=== Second Round: (6) No. 20 Purdue ===
BTN

March 13th
6:00 p.m. PST

(14) USC Trojans vs. (6) No. 20 Purdue Boilermakers

Gainbridge Fieldhouse • Indianapolis, Indiana

== See also ==
- 2024–25 USC Trojans women's basketball team
