= 2024–25 Iowa Hawkeyes men's basketball team =

American college basketball season

2024–25 Iowa Hawkeyes men's basketball
- Conference: Big Ten Conference
- Record: 17–16 (7–13 Big Ten)
- Head coach: Fran McCaffery (15th season)
- Assistant coaches: Sherman Dillard (15th season); Matt Gatens (3rd season); Courtney Eldridge (3rd season); Tristan Spurlock (2nd season); Kyle Denning (1st season)
- Home arena: Carver–Hawkeye Arena

2024–25 Big Ten Conference men's basketball standings
	Conf.				Overall
Team	W		L	PCT	W		L	PCT
No. 7 Michigan State	17	–	3	.850	30	–	7	.811
No. 9 Maryland	14	–	6	.700	27	–	9	.750
No. 10 Michigan †	14	–	6	.700	27	–	10	.730
UCLA	13	–	7	.650	23	–	11	.676
No. 16 Wisconsin	13	–	7	.650	27	–	10	.730
No. 14 Purdue	13	–	7	.650	24	–	12	.667
Illinois	12	–	8	.600	22	–	13	.629
Oregon	12	–	8	.600	25	–	10	.714
Indiana	10	–	10	.500	19	–	13	.594
Ohio State	9	–	11	.450	17	–	15	.531
Rutgers	8	–	12	.400	15	–	17	.469
Minnesota	7	–	13	.350	15	–	17	.469
Northwestern	7	–	13	.350	17	–	16	.515
USC	7	–	13	.350	17	–	18	.486
Iowa	7	–	13	.350	17	–	16	.515
Nebraska	7	–	13	.350	21	–	14	.600
Penn State	6	–	14	.300	16	–	15	.516
Washington	4	–	16	.200	13	–	18	.419
† 2025 Big Ten tournament winner Rankings from AP poll

The 2024–25 Iowa Hawkeyes men's basketball team represented the University of Iowa during the 2024–25 NCAA Division I men's basketball season. They were led by head coach Fran McCaffery, in his 15th and final season with the Hawkeyes. The team played its home games at Carver–Hawkeye Arena in Iowa City, Iowa as a member of the Big Ten Conference. They finished the season 17–15, 7–13 in Big Ten play, resulting in a tie five-way tie for 12th place. As the No. 15 seed in the Big Ten tournament, they upset Ohio State in the first round before losing to Illinois in the second round.

On March 14, 2025, the school fired head coach Fran McCaffery after 15 seasons. He finished with a 297–207 overall record with Iowa. On March 24, the school named Drake head coach Ben McCollum the team's new coach.

== Previous season ==
The Hawkeyes finished the 2023–24 season 19–15, 10–10 in Big Ten play to finish in a three-way tie for sixth place. As the No. 7 seed in the Big Ten tournament, they lost to Ohio State in the first round. The Hawkeyes automatically qualified for the National Invitation Tournament as the No. 3 seed where they defeated Kansas State in the first round before losing to Utah in the second round.

== Offseason ==
=== Departures ===
Iowa departures
Name	Number	Pos.	Height	Weight	Year	Hometown	Reason for departure
Spencer Hutchison	1	G	6'4"	202	RS Freshman	Dallas, TX	Walk-on; left the team
Dasonte Bowen	5	G	6'2"	183	Sophomore	Boston, MA	Transferred to St. Bonaventure
Jovone Cater	10	G	6'2"	180	Senior	Far Rockaway, NY	Walk-on; graduated
Tony Perkins	11	G	6'4"	205	Senior	Indianapolis, IN	Transferred to Missouri
Patrick McCaffery	22	F	6'9"	212	RS Senior	Iowa City, IA	Transferred to Butler
Ben Krikke	23	F	6'9"	245	GS Senior	Edmonton, Alberta	Graduated

=== Incoming transfers ===
Iowa incoming transfers
Name	Number	Pos.	Height	Weight	Year	Hometown	Previous school
Drew Thelwell	3	G	6'3"	195	GS Senior	Orlando, FL	Morehead State
Seydou Traore	7	F	6'7"	215	Sophomore	New York City, NY	Manhattan
Isaiah Johnson-Arigu		F	6'7"	220	Freshman	Minneapolis, MN	Miami (FL)

=== Recruiting classes ===
==== 2024 recruiting class ====
College recruiting information
Name	Hometown	School	Height	Weight	Commit date
Cooper Koch; SF	Peoria, Illinois	Metamora Township High School	6 ft 8 in (2.03 m)	205 lb (93 kg)	Jun 23, 2022
Cooper Koch; SF	Recruit ratings: Rivals: 247Sports: ESPN: (86)				
Chris Tadjo; PF	Montreal, Quebec	NBA Academy Latin America	6 ft 8 in (2.03 m)	220 lb (100 kg)	Sep 22, 2023
Chris Tadjo; PF	Recruit ratings: Rivals: 247Sports: ESPN: (N/A)				
Overall recruit ranking: Rivals: 60 247Sports: 84 ESPN: —
Note: In many cases, Scout, Rivals, 247Sports, On3, and ESPN may conflict in their listings of height and weight.; In these cases, the average was taken. ESPN grades are on a 100-point scale.; Sources: "Iowa 2024 Basketball Commitments". Rivals.; "2024 Iowa Hawkeyes Recruiting Class". ESPN.; "2024 Team Ranking". Rivals.

==== 2025 recruiting class ====
There are no current recruits for 2025.

== Roster ==
2024–25 Iowa Hawkeyes men's basketball team
Players
Coaches

Pos.	#	Name	Height	Weight	Year	Previous school	Hometown
F	0	Even Brauns	6 ft 9 in (2.06 m)	245 lb (111 kg)	GS	Belmont	Iowa City, IA
G	2	Brock Harding	6 ft 0 in (1.83 m)	162 lb (73 kg)	So	Moline HS	Moline, IL
G	3	Drew Thelwell	6 ft 3 in (1.91 m)	195 lb (88 kg)	GS	Morehead State	Orlando, FL
G	4	Josh Dix	6 ft 5 in (1.96 m)	200 lb (91 kg)	Jr	Abraham Lincoln HS	Council Bluffs, IA
G	5	Trey Buchanan (W)	6 ft 1 in (1.85 m)	180 lb (82 kg)	Fr	Westfield HS	Westfield, IN
F	7	Seydou Traore	6 ft 7 in (2.01 m)	215 lb (98 kg)	So	Manhattan	New York City, NY
F	8	Cooper Koch	6 ft 8 in (2.03 m)	205 lb (93 kg)	Fr	Metamora Township HS	Peoria, IL
G	10	Jacob Koch (W)	6 ft 1 in (1.85 m)	180 lb (82 kg)	Fr	Iowa City West HS	Iowa City, IA
F	13	Ladji Dembele	6 ft 8 in (2.03 m)	250 lb (113 kg)	So	St. Benedict's Prep	Newark, NJ
G	14	Carter Kingsbury (W)	6 ft 4 in (1.93 m)	225 lb (102 kg)	RS Jr	Brewster Academy	Ponca, NE
F	20	Payton Sandfort	6 ft 7 in (2.01 m)	215 lb (98 kg)	Sr	Waukee HS	Waukee, IA
F	24	Pryce Sandfort	6 ft 6 in (1.98 m)	205 lb (93 kg)	So	Waukee Northwest HS	Waukee, IA
G	25	Luc Laketa (W)	6 ft 5 in (1.96 m)	185 lb (84 kg)	Sr	The Winchendon School	Concord, MI
F	32	Owen Freeman (injured)	6 ft 10 in (2.08 m)	230 lb (104 kg)	So	Moline HS	Moline, IL
F	34	Chris Tadjo	6 ft 8 in (2.03 m)	220 lb (100 kg)	Fr	NBA Academy Latin America	Montreal, Quebec
F	44	Riley Mulvey	6 ft 10 in (2.08 m)	230 lb (104 kg)	RS Jr	St. Thomas More School	Rotterdam, NY
F		Isaiah Johnson-Arigu	6 ft 7 in (2.01 m)	220 lb (100 kg)	Fr	Miami (FL)	Minneapolis, MN

Head coach

- Fran McCaffery (Penn)

Assistant coach(es)

- Sherman Dillard (James Madison)
- Matt Gatens (Iowa)
- Courtney Eldridge (UNC Greensboro)
- Tristan Spurlock (Central Florida)
- Kyle Denning (Iowa)

Legend

- (C) Team captain
- (S) Suspended
- (I) Ineligible
- (W) Walk-on
- Injured
- Current redshirt

Roster
Last update: May 18, 2024

== Schedule and results ==
Date time, TV	Rank^{#}	Opponent^{#}	Result	Record	High points	High rebounds	High assists	Site (attendance) city, state
Exhibition
October 25, 2024*; 7:00 p.m., B1G+		Minnesota Duluth	W 102–81	–	23 – Pa. Sandfort	8 – Tied	6 – Harding	Carver–Hawkeye Arena (7,656); Iowa City, Iowa
Regular season
November 4, 2024*; 7:00 p.m., B1G+		Texas A&M–Commerce	W 89–67	1–0	20 – Pa. Sandfort	11 – Pa. Sandfort	7 – Pa. Sanfort	Carver–Hawkeye Arena (7,879); Iowa City, Iowa
November 7, 2024*; 7:00 p.m., B1G+		Southern	W 89–74	2–0	22 – Pr. Sandfort	8 – Tied	7 – Pa. Sandfort	Carver–Hawkeye Arena (8,105); Iowa City, Iowa
November 12, 2024*; 8:00 p.m., BTN		South Dakota	W 96–77	3–0	23 – Dix	8 – Dembele	6 – Tied	Carver–Hawkeye Arena (7,628); Iowa City, Iowa
November 15, 2024*; 7:30 p.m., BTN		vs. Washington State; Quad Cities Hoops Showdown	W 76–66	4–0	21 – Freeman	11 – Freeman	4 – Harding	Vibrant Arena at The MARK (8,488); Moline, Illinois
November 19, 2024*; 7:00 p.m., B1G+		Rider	W 83–58	5–0	22 – Pa. Sandfort	6 – Pa. Sandfort	7 – Thelwell	Carver–Hawkeye Arena (7,851); Iowa City, Iowa
November 22, 2024*; 7:00 p.m., BTN		vs. Utah State; NABC Hall of Fame Classic	L 69–77	5–1	19 – Harding	11 – Freeman	5 – Harding	T-Mobile Center (4,892); Kansas City, Missouri
November 26, 2024*; 7:00 p.m., BTN		USC Upstate	W 110–77	6–1	20 – Harding	7 – Dix	10 – Harding	Carver–Hawkeye Arena (7,732); Iowa City, Iowa
December 3, 2024; 6:00 p.m., Peacock		Northwestern	W 80–79	7–1 (1–0)	22 – Dix	7 – Pa. Sandfort	8 – Harding	Carver–Hawkeye Arena (7,698); Iowa City, Iowa
December 7, 2024; 1:00 p.m., FS1		at Michigan	L 83–85	7–2 (1–1)	19 – Pa. Sandfort	7 – Dix	4 – Tied	Crisler Center (12,290); Ann Arbor, Michigan
December 12, 2024*; 6:30 p.m., FS1		No. 3 Iowa State; Rivalry	L 80–89	7–3 (1–1)	16 – Freeman	6 – Thelwell	8 – Harding	Carver–Hawkeye Arena (13,033); Iowa City, Iowa
December 15, 2024*; 1:00 p.m., BTN		New Orleans	W 104–57	8–3	22 – Freeman	5 – Tied	6 – Harding	Carver–Hawkeye Arena (9,410); Iowa City, Iowa
December 21, 2024*; 5:00 p.m., BTN		vs. Utah	W 95–88	9–3	24 – Pa. Sandfort	8 – Pa. Sandfort	4 – Tied	Sanford Pentagon (3,367); Sioux Falls, South Dakota
December 30, 2024*; 6:00 p.m., BTN		New Hampshire	W 112–70	10–3	15 – Pa. Sandfort	6 – Pa. Sandfort	6 – Traore	Carver–Hawkeye Arena (10,289); Iowa City, Iowa
January 3, 2025; 6:00 p.m., FS1		at Wisconsin	L 85–116	10–4 (1–2)	25 – Thelwell	5 – Pa. Sandfort	5 – Harding	Kohl Center (16,838); Madison, Wisconsin
January 7, 2025; 7:00 p.m., Peacock		Nebraska	W 97–87 ^{OT}	11–4 (2–2)	31 – Dix	8 – Freeman	7 – Tied	Carver–Hawkeye Arena (7,812); Iowa City, Iowa
January 11, 2025; 7:00 p.m., FOX		Indiana	W 85–60	12–4 (3-2)	23 – Sandfort	12 – Freeman	10 – Harding	Carver–Hawkeye Arena (10,948); Iowa City, Iowa
January 14, 2025; 9:30 p.m., FS1		at USC	L 89–99	12–5 (3–3)	23 – Freeman	6 – Freeman	8 – Harding	Galen Center (5,246); Los Angeles, California
January 17, 2025; 8:00 p.m., FS1		at UCLA	L 70–94	12–6 (3–4)	19 – Dix	3 – Tied	5 – Harding	Pauley Pavilion (5,289); Los Angeles, California
January 21, 2025; 8:00 p.m., BTN		Minnesota	L 67–72	12–7 (3–5)	21 – Tied	10 – Pa. Sandfort	9 – Harding	Carver–Hawkeye Arena (8,004); Iowa City, Iowa
January 24, 2025; 8:00 p.m., FS1		Penn State	W 76–75	13–7 (4–5)	16 – Tied	9 – Freeman	8 – Dix	Carver–Hawkeye Arena (8,619); Iowa City, Iowa
January 27, 2025; 7:00 p.m., FS1		at Ohio State	L 65–82	13–8 (4–6)	20 – Thelwell	8 – Freeman	3 – Tied	Value City Arena (11,261); Columbus, Ohio
February 4, 2025; 6:00 p.m., Peacock		No. 7 Purdue	L 81–90	13–9 (4–7)	27 – Dix	6 – Sandfort	5 – Sandfort	Carver–Hawkeye Arena (8,445); Iowa City, Iowa
February 8, 2025; 12:00 p.m., NBC		No. 21 Wisconsin	L 63–74	13–10 (4–8)	14 – Pr. Sandfort	8 – Pa. Sandfort	3 – Tied	Carver–Hawkeye Arena (12,693); Iowa City, Iowa
February 12, 2025; 5:30 p.m., BTN		at Rutgers	W 84–73	14–10 (5–8)	26 – Dix	6 – Tied	7 – Harding	Jersey Mike's Arena (8,000); Piscataway, New Jersey
February 16, 2025; 4:00 p.m., FS1		at No. 25 Maryland	L 75–101	14–11 (5–9)	15 – Pr. Sandfort	10 – Pa. Sandfort	7 – Harding	Xfinity Center (15,681); College Park, Maryland
February 19, 2025; 7:30 p.m., BTN		Oregon	L 78–80	14–12 (5–10)	25 – Pa. Sandfort	6 – Dembele	5 – Pa. Sandfort	Carver–Hawkeye Arena (8,728); Iowa City, Iowa
February 22, 2025; 3:00 p.m., FS1		Washington	W 85–79	15–12 (6–10)	27 – Pa. Sandfort	9 – Pa. Sandfort	5 – Harding	Carver–Hawkeye Arena (10,393); Iowa City, Iowa
February 25, 2025; 8:00 p.m., FS1		at Illinois; Rivalry	L 61–81	15–13 (6–11)	16 – Harding	7 – Pa. Sandfort	4 – Tied	State Farm Center (15,544); Champaign, Illinois
February 28, 2025; 8:00 p.m., FS1		at Northwestern	L 57–68	15–14 (6–12)	14 – Thelwell	9 – Pa. Sandfort	7 – Harding	Welsh–Ryan Arena (6,249); Evanston, Illinois
March 6, 2025; 7:00 p.m., FS1		No. 8 Michigan State	L 84–91	15–15 (6–13)	18 – Dix	7 – Tied	6 – Harding	Carver–Hawkeye Arena (10,347); Iowa City, Iowa
March 9, 2025; 11:30 a.m., FOX		at Nebraska	W 83–68	16–15 (7–13)	22 – Pa. Sandfort	11 – Pr. Sandfort	4 – Tied	Pinnacle Bank Arena (15,697); Lincoln, Nebraska
Big Ten tournament
March 12, 2025; 5:00 p.m., Peacock	(15)	vs. (10) Ohio State; First round	W 77–70	17–15	17 – Pa. Sandfort	9 – Dembele	4 – Dix	Gainbridge Fieldhouse (12,922); Indianapolis, IN
March 13, 2025; 5:30 p.m., BTN	(15)	vs. (7) No. 24 Illinois; Second round	L 94–106	17–16	30 – Pa. Sandfort	4 – Tied	6 – Thelwell	Gainbridge Fieldhouse; Indianapolis, IN
*Non-conference game. ^{#}Rankings from AP Poll. (#) Tournament seedings in parentheses. All times are in Central Time.
