= 2024–25 Big Ten Conference men's basketball season =

- League: NCAA Division I
- Sport: Basketball
- Teams: 18
- TV partner(s): Big Ten Network, Fox, FS1, CBS, Peacock, NBC

2024–25 NCAA Division I men's basketball season
- Regular season champions: Michigan State
- Season MVP: Braden Smith
- Top scorer: Nick Martinelli

Tournament
- Venue: Gainbridge Fieldhouse, Indianapolis, Indiana
- Champions: Michigan
- Runners-up: Wisconsin
- Finals MVP: Vladislav Goldin

Basketball seasons
- 2023–24 2025–26

2024–25 Big Ten Conference men's basketball standings
	Conf.				Overall
Team	W		L	PCT	W		L	PCT
No. 7 Michigan State	17	–	3	.850	30	–	7	.811
No. 9 Maryland	14	–	6	.700	27	–	9	.750
No. 10 Michigan †	14	–	6	.700	27	–	10	.730
UCLA	13	–	7	.650	23	–	11	.676
No. 16 Wisconsin	13	–	7	.650	27	–	10	.730
No. 14 Purdue	13	–	7	.650	24	–	12	.667
Illinois	12	–	8	.600	22	–	13	.629
Oregon	12	–	8	.600	25	–	10	.714
Indiana	10	–	10	.500	19	–	13	.594
Ohio State	9	–	11	.450	17	–	15	.531
Rutgers	8	–	12	.400	15	–	17	.469
Minnesota	7	–	13	.350	15	–	17	.469
Northwestern	7	–	13	.350	17	–	16	.515
USC	7	–	13	.350	17	–	18	.486
Iowa	7	–	13	.350	17	–	16	.515
Nebraska	7	–	13	.350	21	–	14	.600
Penn State	6	–	14	.300	16	–	15	.516
Washington	4	–	16	.200	13	–	18	.419
† 2025 Big Ten tournament winner Rankings from AP poll

The 2024–25 Big Ten men's basketball season was for the Big Ten Conference in the 2024–25 NCAA Division I men's basketball season. The basketball teams began practicing in October 2024, followed by the start of the season in November 2024. The regular season concluded on March 9, 2025.

This was the conference's first season with 18 teams, as four schools joined the conference in 2024: Oregon, UCLA, USC, and Washington. Each team played 20 regular season conference games, seven opponents only at home, seven others only on the road, and a home-and-home with three opposing schools.

With a loss by Michigan on March 5, 2025, Michigan State secured at least a share of the Big Ten regular season championship, their first since 2020. On March 6, the Spartans secured the outright regular season championship with a win over Iowa, their first outright championship since 2018. Purdue point guard Braden Smith was named the Big Ten Player of the Year and Michigan State head coach Tom Izzo was named the Big Ten Coach of the Year.

The Big Ten tournament was held from March 12 through March 16 at Gainbridge Fieldhouse in Indianapolis, Indiana. Michigan defeated Wisconsin to win the school's fourth Big Ten tournament championship.

Michigan received the conference's automatic NCAA tournament bid, in addition Illinois, Maryland, Michigan State, Oregon, Purdue, Wisconsin, and UCLA received at-large bids to the tournament. In the first round the Big Ten went 8–0, setting an NCAA record for the most wins without a loss by any conference in any round in the history of the tournament. Maryland, Michigan, Michigan State and Purdue advanced to the Sweet Sixteen. Only Michigan State advanced to the Elite Eight before losing, extending the conference's national championship drought to 25 years.

== Head coaches ==
=== Coaching changes ===
==== Michigan ====
On March 15, 2024, Michigan fired head coach Juwan Howard after finishing the 2023–24 season with an 8–24 record. On March 24, the school named Florida Atlantic head coach Dusty May the team's new head coach.

==== Ohio State ====
On February 15, Ohio State fired Chris Holtmann. The school named associate head coach Jake Diebler the team's interim head coach. Following the completion of the Big Ten Tournament, the school named Diebler the team's new head coach after finishing the season with a 6–2 record as interim coach.

==== USC ====
On April 1, USC head coach Andy Enfield left the school to take the head coaching position at SMU. On April 4, the school named Arkansas head coach Eric Musselman the team's new head coach.

==== Washington ====
On March 8, Washington fired head coach Mike Hopkins after seven seasons. On March 25, the school named Utah State head coach Danny Sprinkle the team's new head coach.

=== Coaches ===
Team	Head coach	Previous job	Years at school	Overall record	Big Ten record	Big Ten titles	Big Ten tournament titles	NCAA Tournaments	NCAA Final Fours	NCAA Championships
Illinois	Brad Underwood	Oklahoma State	8	132–88 (.600)	80–58 (.580)	1	2	4	0	0
Indiana	Mike Woodson	New York Knicks (Asst.)	4	63–40 (.612)	31–29 (.517)	0	0	2	0	0
Iowa	Fran McCaffery	Siena	15	282–191 (.596)	136–128 (.515)	0	1	7	0	0
Maryland	Kevin Willard	Seton Hall	2	38–30 (.559)	18–22 (.450)	0	0	1	0	0
Michigan	Dusty May	Florida Atlantic	1	0–0 (–)	0–0 (–)	0	0	0	0	0
Michigan State	Tom Izzo	Michigan State (Asst.)	30	707–295 (.706)	342–170 (.668)	10	6	26	8	1
Minnesota	Ben Johnson	Xavier (Asst.)	4	41–57 (.418)	15–44 (.254)	0	0	0	0	0
Nebraska	Fred Hoiberg	Chicago Bulls	6	40–83 (.325)	18–61 (.228)	0	0	1	0	0
Northwestern	Chris Collins	Duke (Asst.)	12	177–174 (.504)	80–127 (.386)	0	0	3	0	0
Ohio State	Jake Diebler	Ohio State (Assoc.)	2	8–3 (.727)	5–1 (.833)	0	0	0	0	0
Oregon	Dana Altman	Creighton	15	345–152 (.694)	0–0 (–)	0	0	8	1	0
Penn State	Mike Rhoades	VCU	2	16–17 (.485)	9–11 (.450)	0	0	0	0	0
Purdue	Matt Painter	Purdue (Assoc.)	20	403–201 (.667)	209–120 (.635)	5	2	14	1	0
Rutgers	Steve Pikiell	Stony Brook	9	122–124 (.496)	63–73 (.463)	0	0	2	0	0
UCLA	Mick Cronin	Cincinnati	6	115–53 (.685)	0–0 (–)	0	0	3	1	0
USC	Eric Musselman	Arkansas	1	0–0 (–)	0–0 (–)	0	0	0	0	0
Washington	Danny Sprinkle	Utah State	1	0–0 (–)	0–0 (–)	0	0	0	0	0
Wisconsin	Greg Gard	Wisconsin (Assoc.)	10	186–107 (.635)	101–70 (.591)	2	0	6	0	0

Notes:

- All records, appearances, titles, etc. are from time with current school only.
- Year at school includes 2024–25 season.
- Overall and Big Ten records are from time at current school only and are through the beginning of the season.

== Preseason ==
=== Preseason Big Ten poll ===
The Big Ten Media poll was released on October 2, 2024.

Rank	Team
1	Purdue
2	Indiana
3	UCLA
4	Illinois
5	Michigan State
6	Oregon
7	Rutgers
8	Ohio State
9	Michigan
10	Maryland
11	Iowa
12	Nebraska
12	Wisconsin
14	USC
15	Washington
16	Northwestern
17	Penn State
18	Minnesota

=== Preseason All-Big Ten ===
A select media panel named a preseason All-Big Ten team and player of the year.

Honor	Recipient
Preseason Player of the Year	Braden Smith, Purdue
Preseason All-Big Ten Team	Oumar Ballo, Indiana
Preseason All-Big Ten Team	Payton Sandfort, Iowa
Preseason All-Big Ten Team	Dawson Garcia, Minnesota
Preseason All-Big Ten Team	Brooks Barnhizer, Northwestern
Preseason All-Big Ten Team	Bruce Thornton, Ohio State
Preseason All-Big Ten Team	Jackson Shelstad, Oregon
Preseason All-Big Ten Team	Ace Baldwin Jr., Penn State
Preseason All-Big Ten Team	Braden Smith, Purdue
Preseason All-Big Ten Team	Dylan Harper, Rutgers
Preseason All-Big Ten Team	Great Osobor, Washington

=== Preseason national polls ===
	AP	Blue Ribbon Yearbook	CBS Sports	Coaches	ESPN	FOX Sports	Lindy's Sports	Sporting News	Sports Illustrated
Illinois		17		24		25	21	22	21
Indiana	17	14	18	18	18	16	15	18	26
Iowa									40
Maryland									43
Michigan									41
Michigan State							26		36
Minnesota									84
Nebraska									63
Northwestern									54
Ohio State			15				22		34
Oregon							30		29
Penn State									61
Purdue	14	22	12	13	16	14	17	6	14
Rutgers	25		23		25		35	25	32
UCLA	22		19	22	24	17	19	17	30
USC							37		48
Washington							33		65
Wisconsin									68

=== Preseason watchlists ===
Below is a table of notable midseason watch lists.

Player	Wooden	Naismith	Naismith DPOY	Robertson	Cousy	West	Erving	Malone	Abdul-Jabbar
Jaden Akins, Michigan State				✓					
Ace Bailey, Rutgers	✓	✓		✓			✓		
Ace Baldwin Jr., Penn State	✓	✓	✓	✓	✓				
Oumar Ballo, Indiana	✓	✓							✓
Nate Bittle, Oregon				✓					
Frankie Fidler, Michigan State							✓		
Dawson Garcia, Minnesota	✓	✓							✓
Ja'Kobi Gillespie, Maryland				✓					
Vladislav Goldin, Michigan									✓
Dylan Harper, Rutgers	✓	✓		✓	✓				
Kasparas Jukcionis, Illinois				✓					
Meechie Johnson Jr., Ohio State						✓			
Trey Kaufman-Renn, Purdue				✓					
William Kyle III, UCLA									✓
Fletcher Loyer, Purdue						✓			
Nick Martinelli, Northwestern				✓					
Mackenzie Mgbako, Indiana							✓		
Great Osobor, Washington	✓	✓						✓	
Derik Queen, Maryland									✓
Julian Reese, Maryland								✓	
Malik Reneau, Indiana								✓	
Myles Rice, Indiana					✓				
Will Riley, Illinois								✓	
Payton Sandfort, Iowa	✓	✓					✓		
Jackson Shelstad, Oregon		✓							
Braden Smith, Purdue	✓	✓		✓	✓				
Bruce Thornton, Ohio State	✓	✓			✓				
John Tonje, Wisconsin				✓					
Danny Wolf, Michigan				✓					

=== Preseason All-American teams ===
Player	AP	CBS	Fox Sports
Braden Smith, Purdue	RV	2nd team	2nd team
Ace Bailey, Rutgers	RV		
Oumar Ballo, Indiana			2nd team

== Regular season ==
=== Rankings ===
Legend
	Improvement in ranking
	Drop in ranking
	Not ranked previous week
RV	Received votes but were not ranked in Top 25 of poll
(Italics)	Number of first place votes

		Pre/ Wk 1	Wk 2	Wk 3	Wk 4	Wk 5	Wk 6	Wk 7	Wk 8	Wk 9	Wk 10	Wk 11	Wk 12	Wk 13	Wk 14	Wk 15	Wk 16	Wk 17	Wk 18	Wk 19	Wk 20	Final
Illinois	AP	RV	RV	25	RV	19	RV	RV	24	22	13	19	17	18	23	RV	RV	RV	RV	24	RV	
Illinois	C	24	20	20	RV	17	RV	RV	22	20	15	20	17	20	25	RV	RV		RV	25	RV	
Indiana	AP	17	16	16	14	RV	RV	RV	RV	RV	RV											
Indiana	C	18	16	18	15	RV	RV				RV	RV										
Iowa	AP																					
Iowa	C																					
Maryland	AP	RV	RV	RV	RV	RV	RV	RV	RV	RV	RV	RV	RV	RV	18	25	20	16	13	11	11	
Maryland	C	RV	RV		RV	RV	RV	RV	RV	24	RV	RV	RV	RV	24	25	20	15	14	11	12	
Michigan	AP	RV	RV	RV		RV	14	24	RV	RV	24	20	21	RV	24	20	12	15	17	22	14	
Michigan	C					23	14	21	RV	RV	24	19	20	RV	22	17	12	13	15	21	15	
Michigan State	AP	RV	RV	RV	RV	RV	21	20	18	18	16	12	8	7	9	11	14	8	8	7	8	
Michigan State	C	RV	RV	RV	RV	25	19	19	18	15	14	12	8	7	9	11	13	8	7	6	7	
Minnesota	AP																					
Minnesota	C																					
Nebraska	AP				RV	RV				RV	RV											
Nebraska	C				RV	RV					RV											
Northwestern	AP																					
Northwestern	C																					
Ohio State	AP	RV	21	RV	RV	RV			RV	RV												
Ohio State	C	RV	22	RV	RV	RV																
Oregon	AP	RV	RV	RV	RV	12	12	10	9	9	15	13	15	16	RV			RV	RV	23	25	
Oregon	C	RV	RV	RV	RV	10	12	10	9	9	17	13	15	18	RV	RV		RV	RV	RV	RV	
Penn State	AP			RV	RV		RV	RV	RV	RV												
Penn State	C				RV		RV	RV	RV	RV												
Purdue	AP	14	13	6	13	8	11	16	21	20	20	17	11	10	7	7	13	20	18	20	22	
Purdue	C	13	12	6	12	7	11	17	25	22	19	15	12	10	7	7	14	19	18	20	22	
Rutgers	AP	25	24	24																		
Rutgers	C	RV	24	RV	RV																	
UCLA	AP	22			RV	RV	24	18	22	15	22			RV	RV	RV	RV	RV	RV	RV	RV	
UCLA	C	22	RV		RV	RV	21	18	21	18	21	RV	RV		RV	RV	RV	RV	RV	RV	RV	
USC	AP																					
USC	C																					
Washington	AP																					
Washington	C																					
Wisconsin	AP	RV	RV	19	15	11	20	RV	RV	RV	RV	24	18	17	21	16	11	11	12	18	13	
Wisconsin	C	RV		25	17	11	22	RV	RV		RV	RV	19	17	19	15	11	12	12	14	10	

=== Players of the week ===
Throughout the conference regular season, the Big Ten offices will name one or two players of the week and one or two freshmen of the week each Monday.

Week	Player of the week	Freshman of the week
November 11, 2024	Nick Martinelli, Northwestern	Will Riley, Illinois
November 18, 2024	John Tonje, Wisconsin	Dylan Harper, Rutgers
November 25, 2024	John Tonje (2), Wisconsin	Derik Queen, Maryland
December 2, 2024	Trey Kaufman-Renn, Purdue	Dylan Harper (2), Rutgers
December 9, 2024	Vladislav Goldin, Michigan	Derik Queen (2), Maryland
December 16, 2024	Brice Williams, Nebraska	Kasparas Jakučionis, Illinois
December 16, 2024	Brice Williams, Nebraska	Dylan Harper (3), Rutgers
December 23, 2024	Bruce Thornton, Ohio State	John Mobley Jr., Ohio State
January 6, 2025	Braden Smith, Purdue	Kasparas Jakučionis (2), Illinois
January 6, 2025	Braden Smith, Purdue	Ace Bailey, Rutgers
January 13, 2025	Payton Sandfort, Iowa	Wesley Yates III, USC
January 13, 2025	Vladislav Goldin (2), Michigan	Wesley Yates III, USC
January 20, 2025	Trey Kaufman-Renn (2), Purdue	Ace Bailey (2), Rutgers
January 27, 2025	Dawson Garcia, Minnesota	Derik Queen (3), Maryland
February 3, 2025	Brice Williams (2), Nebraska	Will Riley (2), Illinois
February 10, 2025	Trey Kaufman-Renn (3), Purdue	Will Riley (3), Illinois
February 10, 2025	Trey Kaufman-Renn (3), Purdue	Derik Queen (4), Maryland
February 17, 2025	John Tonje (3), Wisconsin	Derik Queen (5), Maryland
February 24, 2025	Nate Bittle, Oregon	Jase Richardson, Michigan State
March 3, 2025	Nick Martinelli (2), Northwestern	Jase Richardson (2), Michigan State
March 10, 2025	D’Marco Dunn, Penn State	Jase Richardson (3), Michigan State

=== Early season tournaments ===
Of the 18 Big Ten teams, 13 will participate in early season tournaments.

Team	Tournament	Finish
Indiana	Battle 4 Atlantis	7th
Michigan	Fort Myers Tip-Off	1st
Michigan State	Maui Invitational	3rd
Minnesota	ESPN Events Invitational	4th
Nebraska	Diamond Head Classic	1st
Northwestern	Arizona Tip-Off	3rd
Oregon	Players Era Festival	1st
Penn State	Sunshine Slam	2nd
Purdue	Rady Children's Invitational	1st
Rutgers	Players Era Festival	6th
USC	Acrisure Classic	4th
Washington	Acrisure Invitational	1st
Wisconsin	Greenbrier Tip-Off	1st

=== Conference matrix ===
This table summarizes the head-to-head results between teams in conference play. Each team is scheduled to play 20 conference games with at least one game against each opponent.

	Illinois	Indiana	Iowa	Maryland	Michigan	Michigan St	Minnesota	Nebraska	Northwestern	Ohio St	Oregon	Penn St	Purdue	Rutgers	UCLA	USC	Washington	Wisconsin
vs. Illinois	–	0–1	0–1	1–0	0–1	2–0	0–1	1–0	1–1	0–1	0–1	0–1	0–1	1–0	0–1	1–0	0–1	1–1
vs. Indiana	1–0	–	1–0	1–0	1–0	0–1	0–1	1–0	1–0	0–2	1–0	0–2	1–1	0–1	1–0	0–1	0–1	1–0
vs. Iowa	1–0	0–1	–	1–0	1–1	1–0	1–0	0–2	1–1	1–0	1–0	0–1	1–0	0–1	1–0	1–0	0–1	2–0
vs. Maryland	0–1	0–1	0–1	–	0–0	1–0	0–1	0–2	1–1	1–1	1–0	0–1	1–0	0–1	0–1	0–1	1–0	0–1
vs. Michigan	1–0	0–1	0–1	1–0	–	2–0	1–0	0–1	0–1	0–1	0–1	0–1	1–1	0–2	0–1	0–1	0–1	0–1
vs. Michigan St	0–2	1–0	0–1	0–1	0–2	–	0–2	0–1	0–1	0–1	0–1	0–1	0–1	0–1	1–0	1–0	0–1	0–1
vs. Minnesota	1–0	1–0	0–1	1–0	0–1	2–0	–	0–1	1–0	1–0	0–1	1–1	1–0	1–0	0–1	0–1	1–0	2–0
vs. Nebraska	0–1	0–1	2–0	2–0	1–0	1–0	1–0	–	0–1	1–1	0–1	1–0	1–0	1–0	0–1	1–0	0–1	1–0
vs. Northwestern	1–1	0–1	1–1	1–1	1–0	1–0	0–1	1–0	–	0–1	1–0	1–0	1–0	1–0	1–0	0–1	1–0	1–0
vs. Ohio State	1–0	2–0	0–1	1–1	1–0	1–0	0–1	1–1	1–0	–	1–0	0–1	0–1	0–1	1–0	0–1	0–1	1–0
vs. Oregon	1–0	0–1	0–1	0–1	1–0	1–0	1–0	1–0	0–1	0–1	–	0–1	1–0	0–1	2–0	0–2	0–2	0–1
vs. Penn State	1–0	2–0	1–0	1–0	1–0	1–0	1–1	0–1	0–1	1–0	1–0	–	0–1	1–1	1–0	1–0	1–0	0–1
vs. Purdue	1–0	1–1	0–1	0–1	1–1	1–0	0–1	0–1	0–1	1–0	0–1	1–0	–	0–2	0–1	0–1	0–1	1–0
vs. Rutgers	0–1	1–0	1–0	1–0	2–0	1–0	0–1	0–1	0–1	1–0	1–0	1–1	2–0	–	0–1	0–1	0–1	1–0
vs. UCLA	1–0	0–1	0–1	1–0	1–0	0–1	1–0	1–0	0–1	0–1	0–2	0–1	1–0	1–0	–	0–2	0–2	0–1
vs. USC	0–1	1–0	0–1	1–0	1–0	0–1	1–0	0–1	1–0	1–0	2–0	0–1	1–0	1–0	2–0	–	0–2	1–0
vs. Washington	1–0	1–0	1–0	0–1	1–0	1–0	0–1	1–0	0–1	1–0	1–0	0–1	1–0	1–0	2–0	2–0	–	1–0
vs. Wisconsin	1–1	0–1	0–2	1–0	1–0	1–0	0–2	0–1	0–1	0–1	2–0	1–1	0–1	0–1	1–0	0–1	0–1	–
Total	12–8	10–10	7–13	14–6	14–6	17–3	7–13	7–13	7–13	9–11	12–8	6–14	13–7	8–12	13–7	7–13	4–16	13–7

Final conference records

=== All-Big Ten awards and teams ===
On March 11, 2025, the Big Ten announced most of its conference awards.

Honor	Coaches	Media
Player of the Year	Braden Smith, Purdue	Braden Smith, Purdue
Coach of the Year	Tom Izzo, Michigan State	Tom Izzo, Michigan State
Freshman of the Year	Derik Queen, Maryland	Derik Queen, Maryland
Defensive Players of the Year	Ace Baldwin Jr., Penn State	Not selected
Sixth Man of the Year	Will Riley, Illinois	Not selected
All-Big Ten First Team	Derik Queen, Maryland	Vladislav Goldin, Michigan
All-Big Ten First Team	Brice Williams, Nebraska	Brice Williams, Nebraska
All-Big Ten First Team	Trey Kaufman-Renn, Purdue	Trey Kaufman-Renn, Purdue
All-Big Ten First Team	Braden Smith, Purdue	Braden Smith, Purdue
All-Big Ten First Team	John Tonje, Wisconsin	John Tonje, Wisconsin
All-Big Ten Second Team	Vladislav Goldin, Michigan	Derik Queen, Maryland
All-Big Ten Second Team	Danny Wolf, Michigan	Danny Wolf, Michigan
All-Big Ten Second Team	Dawson Garcia, Minnesota	Dawson Garcia, Minnesota
All-Big Ten Second Team	Nick Martinelli, Northwestern	Nick Martinelli, Northwestern
All-Big Ten Second Team	Bruce Thornton, Ohio State	Bruce Thornton, Ohio State
All-Big Ten Third Team	Kasparas Jakucionis, Illinois	Kasparas Jakucionis, Illinois
All-Big Ten Third Team	Ja’Kobi Gillespie, Maryland	Ja’Kobi Gillespie, Maryland
All-Big Ten Third Team	Jaden Akins, Michigan State	Jase Richardson, Michigan State
All-Big Ten Third Team	Jase Richardson, Michigan State	Ace Bailey, Rutgers
All-Big Ten Third Team	Nate Bittle, Oregon	Dylan Harper, Rutgers
All-Big Ten Third Team	Jackson Shelstad, Oregon	Not selected
All-Big Ten Third Team	Tyler Bilodeau, UCLA	Not selected
All-Big Ten Honorable Mention	Oumar Ballo, Indiana	Tomislav Ivišić, Illinois
All-Big Ten Honorable Mention	Payton Sandfort, Iowa	Malik Reneau, Indiana
All-Big Ten Honorable Mention	Julian Reese, Maryland	Oumar Ballo, Indiana
All-Big Ten Honorable Mention	Ace Baldwin Jr., Penn State	Payton Sandfort, Iowa
All-Big Ten Honorable Mention	Ace Bailey, Rutgers	Julian Reese, Maryland
All-Big Ten Honorable Mention	Dylan Harper, Rutgers	Brooks Barnhizer, Northwestern
All-Big Ten Honorable Mention	John Blackwell, Wisconsin	Nate Bittle, Oregon
All-Big Ten Honorable Mention	Not selected	Jackson Shelstad, Oregon
All-Big Ten Honorable Mention	Not selected	Yanic Konan Niederhäuser, Penn State
All-Big Ten Honorable Mention	Not selected	Ace Baldwin Jr., Penn State
All-Big Ten Honorable Mention	Not selected	Fletcher Loyer, Purdue
All-Big Ten Honorable Mention	Not selected	Tyler Bilodeau, UCLA
All-Big Ten Honorable Mention	Not selected	Desmond Claude, USC
All-Big Ten Honorable Mention	Not selected	Great Osobor, Washington
All-Big Ten Honorable Mention	Not selected	John Blackwell, Wisconsin
All-Freshman Team	Kasparas Jakucionis, Illinois	Not selected
All-Freshman Team	Derik Queen, Maryland	Not selected
All-Freshman Team	Jase Richardson, Michigan State	Not selected
All-Freshman Team	Ace Bailey, Rutgers	Not selected
All-Freshman Team	Dylan Harper, Rutgers	Not selected
All-Defensive Team	Jadin Akins, Michigan State	Not selected
All-Defensive Team	TJ Bamba, Oregon	Not selected
All-Defensive Team	Nate Bittle, Oregon	Not selected
All-Defensive Team	Ace Baldwin Jr., Penn State	Not selected
All-Defensive Team	Kobe Johnson, UCLA	Not selected

== Postseason ==
=== Big Ten tournament ===
First round Wednesday, March 12; Peacock
12	Minnesota	64
13	Northwestern	72
10	Ohio State	70
15	Iowa	77
11	Rutgers	89
14	USC	97^{2OT}

Second round Thursday, March 13; BTN
8	Oregon	72
9	Indiana	59
5	Wisconsin	70
13	Northwestern	63
7	Illinois	106
15	Iowa	94
6	Purdue	76
14	USC	71

Quarterfinals; Friday, March 14; BTN
1	Michigan State	74
8	Oregon	64
4	UCLA	70
5	Wisconsin	86
2	Maryland	88
7	Illinois	65
3	Michigan	86
6	Purdue	68

Semifinals; Saturday, March 15; CBS
1	Michigan State	74
5	Wisconsin	77
2	Maryland	80
3	Michigan	81

Championship; Sunday, March 16; CBS
5	Wisconsin	53
3	Michigan	59

Although the conference grew by four teams, it has allotted only one additional spot for the conference tournament – meaning three teams will not qualify for the tournament. The tournament will still be over five days, with double byes for the top four seeds, and single byes for the next five seeds.

=== NCAA Tournament ===
Seed	Region	School	First round	Second round	Sweet Sixteen	Elite Eight	Final Four	Championship
2	South	Michigan State	W 87–62 vs. (15) Bryant	W 71–62 vs. (10) New Mexico	W 73–70 vs. (6) Ole Miss	L 64–70 vs. (1) Auburn	DNP	
3	East	Wisconsin	W 85–66 vs. (14) Montana	L 89–91 vs. (6) BYU	DNP			
4	West	Maryland	W 81–49 vs. (13) Grand Canyon	W 72–71 vs. (12) Colorado State	L 71–87 vs. (1) Florida	DNP		
4	Midwest	Purdue	W 75–63 vs. (13) High Point	W 76–62 vs. (12) McNeese	L 60–62 vs. (1) Houston	DNP		
5	South	Michigan	W 68–65 vs. (12) UC San Diego	W 91–79 vs. (4) Texas A&M	L 65–78 vs. (1) Auburn	DNP		
5	East	Oregon	W 81–52 vs. (12) Liberty	L 83–87 vs. (4) Arizona	DNP			
6	Midwest	Illinois	W 86–73 vs. (11) Xavier	L 75–84 vs. (3) Kentucky	DNP			
7	Midwest	UCLA	W 72–47 vs. (10) Utah State	L 58–67 vs. (2) Tennessee	DNP			
		W–L (%):	8–0 (1.000)	4–4 (.500)	1–3 (.250)	0–1 (.000)	– (–)	– (–)
Total: 13–8 (.619)

=== CBC ===
School	First round	Second round	Semifinals	Finals
USC	W 89–60 vs. Tulane	L 59–60 vs. Villanova	DNP	
Nebraska	W 86–78 vs. Arizona State	W 81–69 vs. Georgetown	W 79–69 vs. Boise State	W 77–66 vs. UCF
W–L (%):	2–0 (1.000)	1–1 (.500)	1–0 (1.000)	1–0 (1.000)
Total: 5–1 (.833)

=== NIT ===
No Big Ten teams participated in 2025.

== NBA draft ==
PG	Point guard	SG	Shooting guard	SF	Small forward	PF	Power forward	C	Center

Player	Team	Round	Pick #	Position	School
(United States) Dylan Harper	San Antonio Spurs	1	2	SG/PG	Rutgers
(United States) Ace Bailey	Utah Jazz	1	5	SF	Rutgers
(United States) Derik Queen	Atlanta Hawks	1	13	C	Maryland
(Lithuania) Kasparas Jakučionis	Miami Heat	1	20	PG	Illinois
(Canada) Will Riley	Utah Jazz	1	21	SF	Illinois
(United States) Jase Richardson	Orlando Magic	1	25	SG	Michigan State
(United States) / (Israel) Danny Wolf	Brooklyn Nets	1	27	PF	Michigan
(Switzerland) Yanic Konan Niederhäuser	Los Angeles Clippers	1	30	C	Penn State
(United States) Brooks Barnhizer	Oklahoma City Thunder	2	44	SF	Northwestern
(United States) John Tonje	Utah Jazz	2	53	SG	Wisconsin
