= 2024–25 Nebraska Cornhuskers men's basketball team =

American college basketball season

2024–25 Nebraska Cornhuskers men's basketball

Diamond Head Classic Champions

College Basketball Crown, Champions
- Conference: Big Ten Conference
- Record: 21–14 (7–13 Big Ten)
- Head coach: Fred Hoiberg (6th season)
- Assistant coaches: Adam Howard; Nate Loenser; Ernie Zeigler
- Home arena: Pinnacle Bank Arena

2024–25 Big Ten Conference men's basketball standings
| | Conf. | | | | Overall |
| Team | W | | L | PCT | W | | L | PCT |
|---|---|---|---|---|---|---|---|---|
| No. 7 Michigan State | 17 | – | 3 | .850 | 30 | – | 7 | .811 |
| No. 9 Maryland | 14 | – | 6 | .700 | 27 | – | 9 | .750 |
| No. 10 Michigan † | 14 | – | 6 | .700 | 27 | – | 10 | .730 |
| UCLA | 13 | – | 7 | .650 | 23 | – | 11 | .676 |
| No. 16 Wisconsin | 13 | – | 7 | .650 | 27 | – | 10 | .730 |
| No. 14 Purdue | 13 | – | 7 | .650 | 24 | – | 12 | .667 |
| Illinois | 12 | – | 8 | .600 | 22 | – | 13 | .629 |
| Oregon | 12 | – | 8 | .600 | 25 | – | 10 | .714 |
| Indiana | 10 | – | 10 | .500 | 19 | – | 13 | .594 |
| Ohio State | 9 | – | 11 | .450 | 17 | – | 15 | .531 |
| Rutgers | 8 | – | 12 | .400 | 15 | – | 17 | .469 |
| Minnesota | 7 | – | 13 | .350 | 15 | – | 17 | .469 |
| Northwestern | 7 | – | 13 | .350 | 17 | – | 16 | .515 |
| USC | 7 | – | 13 | .350 | 17 | – | 18 | .486 |
| Iowa | 7 | – | 13 | .350 | 17 | – | 16 | .515 |
| Nebraska | 7 | – | 13 | .350 | 21 | – | 14 | .600 |
| Penn State | 6 | – | 14 | .300 | 16 | – | 15 | .516 |
| Washington | 4 | – | 16 | .200 | 13 | – | 18 | .419 |
† 2025 Big Ten tournament winner Rankings from AP poll

The 2024–25 Nebraska Cornhuskers men's basketball team represented the University of Nebraska–Lincoln in the 2024–25 NCAA Division I men's basketball season. The Cornhuskers were led by sixth-year head coach Fred Hoiberg and played their home games at Pinnacle Bank Arena in Lincoln, Nebraska as members of the Big Ten Conference. They finished the season 21–14, 7–13 in Big Ten play to finish in a five-way tie for 12th place. Due to tiebreaking procedures, they failed to qualify for the Big Ten tournament. The Cornhuskers received an invitation to the inaugural College Basketball Crown tournament where they defeated Arizona State, Georgetown, and Boise State to advance to the tournament championship game where they defeated UCF.

The Nebraska Cornhuskers drew an average home attendance of 14,964, the 13th-highest of all college basketball teams.

== Previous season ==
The Cornhuskers finished the 2023–24 season 23–11, 12–8 in Big Ten play to finish in a tie for third place. As the No. 3 seed in the Big Ten Tournament, the Cornhuskers defeated Indiana before losing to Illinois in the semifinals. They received an at-large bid to the NCAA tournament, their first since 2014, as the No. 8 seed in the South region. There they lost to Texas A&M in the first round.

== Offseason ==
=== Departures ===
| Name | No. | Pos. | Height | Weight | Year | Hometown | Notes |
|---|---|---|---|---|---|---|---|
| Josiah Allick | 53 | F | 6'8" | 231 | Sr | Lincoln, NE | Graduated |
| Jarron Coleman | 9 | G | 6'5" | 215 | Sr | Indianapolis, IN | Graduated |
| Matar Diop | 21 | F | 6'10" | 213 | Fr | Dakar, Senegal | Transferred to Loyola Marymount |
| Blaise Keita | 15 | F | 6'11" | 257 | Jr | Bamako, Mali | Transferred to Western Kentucky |
| Jamarques Lawrence | 10 | G | 6'3" | 183 | So | Plainfield, NJ | Transferred to Rhode Island |
| Ramel Lloyd Jr. | 22 | G | 6'6" | 210 | RFr | Chatsworth, CA | Transferred to Long Beach State |
| Keisei Tominaga | 30 | G | 6'2" | 179 | Sr | Nagoya, Japan | Graduated |
| C.J. Wilcher | 0 | G | 6'5" | 214 | Jr | Plainfield, NJ | Transferred to Texas A&M |

=== Incoming transfers ===
| Name | No. | Pos. | Height | Weight | Year | Hometown | Previous school |
|---|---|---|---|---|---|---|---|
| Justin Bolis | | F | 6 ft 8 in | 215 lbs | So | Lincoln, NE | SCC |
| Berke Büyüktuncel | | F | 6 ft 9 in | 245 lbs | So | Bursa, Turkey | UCLA |
| Connor Essegian | | G | 6 ft 4 in | 194 lbs | Jr | Fort Wayne, IN | Wisconsin |
| Gavin Griffiths | | G | 6 ft 8 in | 193 lbs | So | Simsbury, CT | Rutgers |
| Braxton Meah | | C | 7 ft 1 in | 250 lbs | Sr | Layton, UT | Washington |
| Andrew Morgan | | F | 6 ft 10 in | 245 lbs | Sr | Waseca, MN | North Dakota State |
| Rollie Worster | | G | 6 ft 4 in | 204 lbs | Sr | Missoula, MT | Utah |

=== 2024 recruiting class ===
College recruiting
| Name | Hometown | School | Height | Weight | Commit date |
|---|---|---|---|---|---|
| Nick Janowski; G | Pewaukee, WI | Pewaukee | 6 ft 3 in (1.91 m) | 200 lb (91 kg) | Apr 14, 2023 |
| Nick Janowski; G | Recruit ratings: Rivals: 247Sports: On3: | | | | |
| Braden Frager; F | Lincoln, NE | Lincoln Southwest | 6 ft 6 in (1.98 m) | 210 lb (95 kg) | Oct 13, 2023 |
| Braden Frager; F | Recruit ratings: Rivals: 247Sports: On3: | | | | |
Overall recruit ranking:
Note: In many cases, Scout, Rivals, 247Sports, On3, and ESPN may conflict in their listings of height and weight.; In these cases, the average was taken. ESPN grades are on a 100-point scale.; Sources: "2024 Team Ranking". Rivals.

== Roster ==
2024–25 Nebraska Cornhuskers men's basketball team
Players
Coaches

| Pos. | # | Name | Height | Weight | Year | Previous school | Hometown |
|---|---|---|---|---|---|---|---|
| G | 0 | Connor Essegian | 6 ft 4 in (1.93 m) | 195 lb (88 kg) | Jr | Wisconsin | Fort Wayne, IN |
| G | 1 | Sam Hoiberg (W) | 6 ft 0 in (1.83 m) | 183 lb (83 kg) | RS Jr | Pius X High School | Lincoln, NE |
| G | 2 | Ahron Ulis | 6 ft 3 in (1.91 m) | 190 lb (86 kg) | Sr | Iowa | Chicago Heights, IL |
| F | 3 | Brice Williams | 6 ft 7 in (2.01 m) | 213 lb (97 kg) | Sr | Charlotte | Huntersville, NC |
| F | 4 | Juwan Gary | 6 ft 6 in (1.98 m) | 221 lb (100 kg) | RS Sr | Alabama | Columbia, SC |
| G | 5 | Braden Frager | 6 ft 6 in (1.98 m) | 210 lb (95 kg) | Fr | Lincoln Southwest High School | Lincoln, NE |
| G | 8 | Jeffrey Grace III (W) | 6 ft 3 in (1.91 m) | 197 lb (89 kg) | RS Jr | Arizona State | Elmhurst, IL |
| F | 9 | Berke Büyüktuncel | 6 ft 9 in (2.06 m) | 245 lb (111 kg) | So | UCLA | Bursa, Turkey |
| G | 12 | Gavin Griffiths | 6 ft 8 in (2.03 m) | 193 lb (88 kg) | So | Rutgers | Simsbury, CT |
| G | 20 | Justin Bolis (W) | 6 ft 8 in (2.03 m) | 215 lb (98 kg) | So | SCC | Lincoln, NE |
| F | 23 | Andrew Morgan | 6 ft 10 in (2.08 m) | 245 lb (111 kg) | Sr | North Dakota State | Waseca, MN |
| G | 24 | Rollie Worster | 6 ft 4 in (1.93 m) | 205 lb (93 kg) | Sr | Utah | Missoula, MT |
| G | 25 | Nick Janowski | 6 ft 3 in (1.91 m) | 200 lb (91 kg) | Fr | Pewaukee High School | Pewaukee, WI |
| G | 31 | Cale Jacobsen (W) | 6 ft 4 in (1.93 m) | 200 lb (91 kg) | RS So | Ashland-Greenwood High School | Ashland, NE |
| C | 34 | Braxton Meah | 7 ft 1 in (2.16 m) | 250 lb (113 kg) | Sr | Washington | Layton, UT |
| F | 35 | Henry Burt (W) | 6 ft 7 in (2.01 m) | 216 lb (98 kg) | RS So | Elkhorn South High School | Omaha, NE |
| F | 51 | Rienk Mast (injured) (redshirt) | 6 ft 10 in (2.08 m) | 248 lb (112 kg) | Sr | Bradley | Groningen, Netherlands |

Head coach

- Fred Hoiberg (Iowa State)

Assistant coach(es)

- Adam Howard (Western Kentucky)
- Nate Loenser (Iowa State)
- Ernie Zeigler (Cleary)

Legend

- (C) Team captain
- (S) Suspended
- (I) Ineligible
- (W) Walk-on
- Injured
- Current redshirt

Roster

== Schedule and results ==
| Date time, TV | Rank^{#} | Opponent^{#} | Result | Record | High points | High rebounds | High assists | Site (attendance) city, state |
Exhibition
| October 27, 2024*; 1:00 p.m., B1G+ | | Grand Valley State | W 73–53 | – | 14 – Griffiths | 12 – Büyüktuncel | 3 – Gary | Pinnacle Bank Arena (14,015); Lincoln, NE |
Regular Season
| November 4, 2024*; 7:00 p.m., B1G+ | | UT Rio Grande Valley | W 87–67 | 1–0 | 27 – Williams | 9 – Worster | 3 – Worster | Pinnacle Bank Arena (14,305); Lincoln, NE |
| November 9, 2024*; 7:00 p.m., B1G+ | | Bethune–Cookman | W 63–58 | 2–0 | 11 – Gary | 9 – Gary | 3 – Griffiths | Pinnacle Bank Arena (15,138); Lincoln, NE |
| November 13, 2024*; 7:00 p.m., B1G+ | | Fairleigh Dickinson | W 86–60 | 3–0 | 19 – Gary | 6 – Williams | 5 – Gary | Pinnacle Bank Arena (14,473); Lincoln, NE |
| November 17, 2024*; 12:00 p.m., BTN | | vs. Saint Mary's | L 74–77 | 3–1 | 28 – Williams | 5 – 2 tied | 2 – 2 tied | Sanford Pentagon (3,241); Sioux Falls, SD |
| November 22, 2024*; 7:00 p.m., FS1 | | at No. 14 Creighton; Rivalry | W 74–63 | 4–1 | 16 – 2 tied | 9 – Büyüktuncel | 3 – Morgan | CHI Health Center Omaha (18,475); Omaha, NE |
| November 27, 2024*; 5:30 p.m., BTN | | South Dakota | W 96–79 | 5–1 | 29 – Essegian | 8 – Worster | 6 – Worster | Pinnacle Bank Arena (15,172); Lincoln, NE |
| December 1, 2024*; 3:00 p.m., BTN | | North Florida | W 103–72 | 6–1 | 22 – Essegian | 9 – Morgan | 6 – Williams | Pinnacle Bank Arena (15,359); Lincoln, NE |
| December 7, 2024; 11:00 a.m., BTN | | at Michigan State | L 52–89 | 6–2 (0–1) | 14 – Morgan | 7 – Morgan | 3 – 2 tied | Breslin Center (14,797); East Lansing, MI |
| December 13, 2024; 7:00 p.m., FOX | | Indiana | W 85–68 | 7–2 (1–1) | 30 – Williams | 6 – Williams | 5 – Williams | Pinnacle Bank Arena (14,635); Lincoln, NE |
| December 22, 2024*; 8:00 p.m., ESPN | | vs. Murray State; Diamond Head Classic Quarterfinals | W 66–49 | 8–2 | 15 – Essegian | 12 – Morgan | 2 – Williams | Stan Sheriff Center; Honolulu, HI |
| December 23, 2024*; 9:30 p.m., ESPN2 | | at Hawaiʻi; Diamond Head Classic Semifinals | W 69–55 | 9–2 | 32 – Williams | 9 – Büyüktuncel | 3 – 2 tied | Stan Sheriff Center; Honolulu, HI |
| December 25, 2024*; 8:45 p.m., ESPN2 | | vs. Oregon State; Diamond Head Classic Championship | W 78–66 | 10–2 | 25 – Williams | 7 – Williams | 4 – 2 tied | Stan Sheriff Center (5,086); Honolulu, HI |
| December 30, 2024*; 8:00 p.m., BTN | | Southern | W 77–43 | 11–2 | 20 – Essegian | 9 – Büyüktuncel | 6 – Worster | Pinnacle Bank Arena (14,855); Lincoln, NE |
| January 4, 2025; 1:00 p.m., FOX | | No. 15 UCLA | W 66–58 | 12–2 (2–1) | 16 – Williams | 9 – Büyüktuncel | 3 – Essegian | Pinnacle Bank Arena (15,167); Lincoln, NE |
| January 7, 2025; 7:00 p.m., Peacock | | at Iowa | L 87–97 ^{OT} | 12–3 (2–2) | 28 – Williams | 13 – Gary | 3 – Hoiberg | Carver–Hawkeye Arena (7,812); Iowa City, IA |
| January 12, 2025; 11:00 a.m., BTN | | at No. 20 Purdue | L 68–104 | 12–4 (2–3) | 17 – Essegian | 5 – 2 tied | 4 – 2 tied | Mackey Arena (14,876); West Lafayette, IN |
| January 16, 2025; 8:00 p.m., FS1 | | Rutgers | L 82–85 | 12–5 (2–4) | 21 – Williams | 7 – 2 tied | 5 – Worster | Pinnacle Bank Arena (13,999); Lincoln, NE |
| January 19, 2025; 11:00 a.m., BTN | | at Maryland | L 66–69 | 12–6 (2–5) | 17 – Morgan | 7 – Gary | 10 – Ulis | Xfinity Center (11,069); College Park, MD |
| January 22, 2025; 8:00 p.m., BTN | | USC | L 73–78 | 12–7 (2–6) | 27 – Büyüktuncel | 4 – Worster | 6 – Worster | Pinnacle Bank Arena (14,492); Lincoln, NE |
| January 26, 2025; 12:00 p.m, BTN | | at No. 18 Wisconsin | L 55–83 | 12–8 (2–7) | 11 – Williams | 9 – Gary | 4 – Worster | Kohl Center (16,838); Madison, WI |
| January 30, 2025; 7:30 p.m., FS1 | | No. 18 Illinois | W 80–74 ^{OT} | 13–8 (3–7) | 27 – Williams | 8 – 2 tied | 4 – 2 tied | Pinnacle Bank Arena (14,893); Lincoln, NE |
| February 2, 2025; 6:30 p.m., BTN | | at No. 16 Oregon | W 77–71 | 14–8 (4–7) | 28 – Williams | 9 – Büyüktuncel | 6 – Williams | Matthew Knight Arena (7,848); Eugene, OR |
| February 5, 2025; 9:30 p.m., BTN | | at Washington | W 86–72 | 15–8 (5–7) | 23 – Williams | 9 – Büyüktuncel | 4 – 2 tied | Alaska Airlines Arena (6,384); Seattle, WA |
| February 9, 2025; 1:00 p.m., BTN | | Ohio State | W 79–71 | 16–8 (6–7) | 24 – Williams | 10 – Williams | 4 – Williams | Pinnacle Bank Arena (15,633); Lincoln, NE |
| February 13, 2025; 7:30 p.m., BTN | | No. 25 Maryland | L 75–83 | 16–9 (6–8) | 22 – Gary | 4 – Tied | 4 – Ulis | Pinnacle Bank Arena (14,785); Lincoln, NE |
| February 16, 2025; 2:00 p.m., BTN | | at Northwestern | W 68–64 | 17–9 (7–8) | 21 – Williams | 7 – Meah | 4 – Tied | Welsh–Ryan Arena (7,039); Evanston, IL |
| February 19, 2025; 5:30 p.m., BTN | | at Penn State | L 72–89 | 17–10 (7–9) | 20 – Essegian | 5 – Griffiths | 5 – Williams | Bryce Jordan Center (7,115); State College, PA |
| February 24, 2025; 7:00 p.m., FS1 | | No. 15 Michigan | L 46–49 | 17–11 (7–10) | 26 – Williams | 8 – Meah | 2 – Ulis | Pinnacle Bank Arena (15,074); Lincoln, NE |
| March 1, 2025; 1:00 p.m., BTN | | Minnesota | L 65–67 | 17–12 (7–11) | 21 – 2 tied | 5 – 4 tied | 2 – 3 tied | Pinnacle Bank Arena (15,749); Lincoln, NE |
| March 4, 2025; 8:00 p.m., Peacock | | at Ohio State | L 114–116 ^{2OT} | 17–13 (7–12) | 43 – Williams | 7 – 2 tied | 4 – Büyüktuncel | Value City Arena (10,021); Columbus, OH |
| March 9, 2025; 11:30 a.m., FOX | | Iowa | L 68–83 | 17–14 (7–13) | 24 – Gary | 7 – 3 tied | 5 – Worster | Pinnacle Bank Arena (15,697); Lincoln, NE |
College Basketball Crown
| March 31, 2025*; 7:30 p.m., FS1 | | vs. Arizona State; First round | W 86–78 | 18–14 | 30 – Williams | 7 – Hoiberg | 5 – Jacobsen | MGM Grand Garden Arena (2,947); Paradise, NV |
| April 2, 2025*; 8:30 p.m., FS1 | | vs. Georgetown; Quarterfinals | W 81–69 | 19–14 | 28 – Williams | 10 – Gary | 4 – Jacobsen | MGM Grand Garden Arena (2,512); Paradise, NV |
| April 5, 2025*; 12:30 p.m., FOX | | vs. Boise State; Semifinals | W 79–69 | 20–14 | 21 – Gary | 9 – Gary | 6 – Williams | T-Mobile Arena (2,972); Paradise, NV |
| April 6, 2025*; 4:30 p.m., FOX | | vs. UCF; Championship | W 77–66 | 21–14 | 21 – Tied | 8 – Gary | 7 – Hoiberg | T-Mobile Arena (3,314); Paradise, NV |
*Non-conference game. ^{#}Rankings from AP poll. (#) Tournament seedings in parentheses. All times are in Central Time.

== Rankings ==
Ranking movements Legend: ██ Increase in ranking ██ Decrease in ranking — = Not ranked RV = Received votes
| | Week | | | | | | | | | | | | | | | | | | | | |
| Poll | Pre | 1 | 2 | 3 | 4 | 5 | 6 | 7 | 8 | 9 | 10 | 11 | 12 | 13 | 14 | 15 | 16 | 17 | 18 | 19 | Final |
|---|---|---|---|---|---|---|---|---|---|---|---|---|---|---|---|---|---|---|---|---|---|
| AP | — | — | — | RV | RV | — | — | — | RV | RV | — | — | — | — | — | — | — | — | — | — | — |
| Coaches | — | — | — | RV | RV | — | — | — | — | RV | — | — | — | — | — | — | — | — | — | — | — |
