= Jackson Shelstad =

American basketball player (born 2005)

No. 3 – Louisville Cardinals
- Position: Point guard
- Conference: Atlantic Coast Conference

Personal information
- Born: April 20, 2005 (age 21)
- Listed height: 6 ft 1 in (1.85 m)
- Listed weight: 185 lb (84 kg)

Career information
- High school: West Linn (West Linn, Oregon)
- College: Oregon (2023–2026); Louisville (2026–present)

Career highlights
- Third-team All-Big Ten (2025); Pac-12 All-Freshman Team (2024); Jordan Brand Classic (2023); Nike Hoop Summit (2023)

Jackson Shelstad (born May 20, 2005) is an American college basketball player for the Louisville Cardinals of the Atlantic Coast Conference (ACC). He previously played for the Oregon Ducks.

== Early life ==
Shelstad grew up in West Linn, Oregon and attended West Linn High School. He was named the Oregon Gatorade Player of the Year after averaging 27 points, 5.2 rebounds, 4.3 steals, and 5.5 assists per game during his junior season. Shelstad repeated as the Oregon Gatorade Player of the Year as a senior after averaging 28.2 points, 5.4 rebounds, 3.5 assists, and 1.9 steals per game. Shelstad was also selected to play for Team USA in the Nike Hoops Summit.

Shelstad played freshman football at West Linn, but left the sport in order to focus on basketball. He returned to the football team as a senior and was named first team All-Three Rivers League at cornerback and also caught 14 passes for 326 yards and six touchdowns as a wide receiver as West Linn won the 6A OSAA state championship.

Shelstad was initially rated as a four-star recruit by major recruiting services. He was later re-rated as a five-star recruit by Rivals.com during his senior year. Shelstad committed to play college basketball at Oregon during his junior year over offers from Arizona State, Florida, Gonzaga, Kansas, Houston, Oregon State, Stanford, Texas Tech, UCLA, and USC.

== College career ==
Shelstad suffered a knee injury during preseason practices before the start of his freshman season at Oregon. On January 28, 2024 Shelstad had a career night in the conference opener, notching 21 points, three rebounds, and two assists in an 82–74 win over USC. Shelstad was named to the Pac-12 Conference All-Freshman team at the end of the season after averaging 12.8 points, 2.8 rebounds, and 2.8 assists per game. He averaged 15.6 and 4.9 assists per game as a junior but was hampered by a hand injury. Following the season Shelstad opted to transfer to Louisville.

== Career statistics ==
Legend
| GP | Games played | GS | Games started | MPG | Minutes per game |
| FG% | Field goal percentage | 3P% | 3-point field goal percentage | FT% | Free throw percentage |
| RPG | Rebounds per game | APG | Assists per game | SPG | Steals per game |
| BPG | Blocks per game | PPG | Points per game | **Bold** | Career high |

=== College ===
| Year | Team | GP | GS | MPG | FG% | 3P% | FT% | RPG | APG | SPG | BPG | PPG |
|---|---|---|---|---|---|---|---|---|---|---|---|---|
| 2023–24 | Oregon | 32 | 30 | 32.6 | .450 | .345 | .857 | 2.8 | 2.8 | 0.7 | 0.2 | 12.8 |
| 2024–25 | Oregon | 35 | 35 | 32.9 | .451 | .379 | .835 | 2.9 | 2.7 | 1.0 | 0.0 | 13.7 |
