= 2026–27 Nebraska Cornhuskers men's basketball team =

American college basketball season

2026–27 Nebraska Cornhuskers men's basketball
- Conference: Big Ten Conference

Ranking
- Coaches: No. 20
- AP: No. 24
- Record: 6–0 (0–0 Big Ten)
- Head coach: Fred Hoiberg (8th season)
- Assistant coaches: Nate Loenser; Ernie Zeigler; Pat Monaghan; Padyn Borders; Emmanuel Tommy
- Home arena: Pinnacle Bank Arena

2026–27 Big Ten Conference men's basketball standings
	Conf.				Overall
Team	W		L	PCT	W		L	PCT
Indiana	0	–	0	–	6	–	0	1.000
Minnesota	0	–	0	–	6	–	0	1.000
No. 24 Nebraska	0	–	0	–	5	–	0	1.000
No. 7 UCLA	0	–	0	–	5	–	0	1.000
No. 18т USC	0	–	0	–	5	–	0	1.000
Washington	0	–	0	–	4	–	0	1.000
No. 10 Illinois	0	–	0	–	5	–	1	.833
No. 2 Michigan State	0	–	0	–	5	–	1	.833
Penn State	0	–	0	–	5	–	1	.833
Oregon	0	–	0	–	3	–	1	.750
Ohio State	0	–	0	–	4	–	2	.667
Purdue	0	–	0	–	4	–	2	.667
Rutgers	0	–	0	–	4	–	2	.667
Wisconsin	0	–	0	–	4	–	2	.667
Iowa	0	–	0	–	3	–	2	.600
Maryland	0	–	0	–	3	–	2	.600
No. 18т Michigan	0	–	0	–	3	–	2	.600
Northwestern	0	–	0	–	3	–	3	.500
† 2027 Big Ten tournament winner As of November 22, 2026; Rankings from AP poll

The 2026-27 Nebraska Cornhuskers men's basketball team represents the University of Nebraska-Lincoln in the 2026–27 NCAA Division I men's basketball season. The Cornhuskers are led by eighth-year head coach Fred Hoiberg and play their home games at Pinnacle Bank Arena in Lincoln, Nebraska as a member of the Big Ten Conference (B1G).

== Previous season ==
The Cornhuskers finished the 2025–26 season 28–7, 15–5 in Big Ten play to finish in a five-way tie for 2nd place. As the 2nd seed in the Big Ten tournament, they would lose to (No. 18 (7th seeded) Purdue) 74-58 in the Quarterfinals. They were invited to play in the 2026 NCAA Tournament, where they were placed in the South Regional, and beat 13th seed Troy 76-47 in the First Round, 5th seed Vanderbilt 74-72 in the Second Round, but would lose the 9th seed Iowa 77-71 in the Regional semifinals ending their season at 28-7 overall record.

== Offseason ==
=== Departures ===
Nebraska departures
Name	Number	Pos.	Height	Weight	Year	Hometown	Reason for departure
Kendall Blue	2	G	6'6"	195	Senior	Woodbury, MN	Transferred back to St. Thomas (MN)
Justin Bolis	7	G	6'8"	225	(redshirt) Sophomore	Lincoln, NE	Transferred to Omaha
Berke Büyüktuncel	9	F	6'10"	224	Junior	Bursa, Turkey	Transferred to Vanderbilt
Jared Garcia	15	F	6'8"	245	Graduate student	Houston, TX	Graduated
Sam Hoiberg	1	G	6'0"	185	(redshirt) Senior	Lincoln, NE	Graduated
Ugnius Jarusevicius	13	F	6'10"	220	Senior	Alytus, Lithuania	Transferred to Arizona
Jamarques Lawrence	10	G	6'3"	183	Senior	Plainfield, NJ	Graduated
Rienk Mast	51	F	6'10"	250	(redshirt) Senior	Groningen, Netherlands	Graduated
Quentin Rhymes	11	G	6'6"	195	(redshirt) Freshman	Las Vegas, NV	Transferred to Fresno State

=== Incoming transfers ===
Nebraska incoming transfers
Name	Number	Pos.	Height	Weight	Year	Hometown	Previous school
Kadyn Betts	7	SF	6'8"	219	RS Senior	Pueblo, CO	Montana
Taj DeGourville	8	SG	6'5"	208	Junior	Las Vegas, NV	San Diego State
Boden Kapke	33	C	6'11"	255	Senior	Victoria, MN	Boston College
Trevan Leonhardt	10	SG	6'5"	174	RS Senior	Kaysville, UT	Utah Valley
Sam Orme	14	PF	6'9"	220	Senior	Carmel, IN	Belmont
Damon Wilkinson	34	C	6'10"	245	Senior	De Smet, SD	South Dakota State

=== 2026 recruiting class ===
College recruiting
Name	Hometown	School	Height	Weight	Commit date
Colin Rice; SF	Waukee, IA	Waukee Northwest	6 ft 8 in (2.03 m)	206 lb (93 kg)	Jul 24, 2025
Colin Rice; SF	Recruit ratings: 247Sports: On3: (82)				
Jacob Lanier; SG	Little Rock, AK	Parkview Magnet	6 ft 5 in (1.96 m)	200 lb (91 kg)	Nov 9, 2025
Jacob Lanier; SG	Recruit ratings: 247Sports: On3: (82)				
Overall recruit ranking: Rivals: 34 247Sports: 54 ESPN: 27
Note: In many cases, Scout, Rivals, 247Sports, On3, and ESPN may conflict in their listings of height and weight.; In these cases, the average was taken. ESPN grades are on a 100-point scale.; Sources: "2026 Nebraska Signees". ESPN.; "2026 Team Ranking". Rivals.

== Roster ==
2026–27 Nebraska Cornhuskers men's basketball team
Players
Coaches

Pos.	#	Name	Height	Weight	Year	Previous school	Hometown
G	0	Connor Essegian	6 ft 4 in (1.93 m)	208 lb (94 kg)	Sr	Wisconsin	Fort Wayne, IN
G/F	4	Colin Rice	6 ft 9 in (2.06 m)	206 lb (93 kg)	Fr	Northwest HS	Waukee, IA
G	5	Braden Frager	6 ft 7 in (2.01 m)	221 lb (100 kg)	RS Jr	Lincoln Southwest HS	Lincoln, NE
F	6	Will Cooper	6 ft 7 in (2.01 m)	219 lb (99 kg)	Jr	Air Force	Omaha, NE
F	7	Kadyn Betts	6 ft 8 in (2.03 m)	219 lb (99 kg)	RS Sr	Montana	Pueblo, CO
G	8	Taj DeGourville	6 ft 6 in (1.98 m)	221 lb (100 kg)	Jr	San Diego State	Las Vegas, NV
F	9	Leo Curtis	7 ft 2 in (2.18 m)	254 lb (115 kg)	So	CATS Academy	Reykjavík, Iceland
G	10	Trevan Leonhardt	6 ft 6 in (1.98 m)	174 lb (79 kg)	RS Sr	Utah Valley	Kaysville, UT
G	13	Jacob Lanier	6 ft 6 in (1.98 m)	200 lb (91 kg)	Fr	Parkview Magnet	Little Rock, AK
F	14	Sam Orme	6 ft 10 in (2.08 m)	224 lb (102 kg)	Sr	Belmont	Carmel, IN
F	21	Pryce Sandfort	6 ft 7 in (2.01 m)	218 lb (99 kg)	Sr	Iowa	Waukee, IA
G	31	Cale Jacobsen (W)	6 ft 4 in (1.93 m)	200 lb (91 kg)	RS Sr	Ashland-Greenwood HS	Ashland, NE
F	33	Boden Kapke	7 ft 0 in (2.13 m)	260 lb (118 kg)	Sr	Boston College	Victoria, MN
F	34	Damon Wilkinson	6 ft 11 in (2.11 m)	250 lb (113 kg)	Sr	South Dakota State	De Smet, SD
F	35	Henry Burt (W)	6 ft 8 in (2.03 m)	236 lb (107 kg)	RS Sr	Elkhorn South HS	Omaha, NE

Head coach

- Fred Hoiberg (Iowa State)

Assistant coach(es)

- Nate Loenser (Iowa State)
- Ernie Zeigler (Cleary)
- Pat Monaghan (Lewis)
- Padyn Borders (Nebraska)
- Emmanuel Tommy (Western Michigan)

Legend

- (C) Team captain
- (S) Suspended
- (I) Ineligible
- (W) Walk-on
- Injured
- Current redshirt

Roster
Last update: October 12, 2026

== Schedule and results ==
Date time, TV	Rank^{#}	Opponent^{#}	Result	Record	High points	High rebounds	High assists	Site (attendance) city, state
Exhibition
October 9, 2026*; 7:00 p.m., B1G+		Saint Louis	L 74–79	–	15 – Lanier	7 – Jacobsen	2 – 2 tied	Pinnacle Bank Arena (14,850); Lincoln, Nebraska
October 16, 2026*; 8:00 p.m., ESPN+		at BYU	L 61–72	–	15 – Jacobsen	7 – Frager	6 – Leonhardt	Marriott Center (15,864); Provo, Utah
October 26, 2026*; 6:30 p.m., B1G+		vs. Kansas State	W 88–84	–	28 – Frager	10 – Frager	3 – 3 tied	BigIron Events Center (5,338); Grand Island, Nebraska
Regular Season
November 2, 2026*; 6:30 p.m., B1G+		Le Moyne	W 106–64	1–0	20 – Sandfort	6 – Lanier	7 – Leonhardt	Pinnacle Bank Arena (14,715); Lincoln, Nebraska
November 7, 2026*; 6:00 p.m., FS1		vs. Providence; Hall of Fame Tip-Off	W 67–58	2–0	25 – Sandfort	7 – Wilkinson	7 – DeGourville	Mohegan Sun Arena (7,654); Uncasville, Connecticut
November 11, 2026*; 8:00 p.m., FS1	No. 25	Lindenwood	W 94–60	3–0	22 – Sandfort	8 – Sandfort	5 – Jacobsen	Pinnacle Bank Arena (14,714); Lincoln, Nebraska
November 15, 2026*; 12:00 p.m., BTN	No. 25	vs. Boise State	W 102–75	4–0	26 – Frager	7 – Frager	8 – DeGourville	Sanford Pentagon (3,526); Sioux Falls, South Dakota
November 18, 2026*; 7:30 p.m., BTN	No. 24	South Dakota	W 73–47	5–0	22 – Sandfort	9 – Wilkinson	2 – Tied	Pinnacle Bank Arena (14,920); Lincoln, Nebraska
November 22, 2026*; 12:00 p.m., FS1	No. 24	vs. Butler; The Bad Boy Mowers Series – Chicago	W 76–74	6–0	17 – Tied	7 – Jacobsen	4 – Tied	Credit Union 1 Arena (1,138); Chicago, Illinois
November 25, 2026*; 4:00 p.m., BTN		Southern						Pinnacle Bank Arena; Lincoln, Nebraska
December 2, 2026; 7:30 p.m., BTN		Ohio State						Pinnacle Bank Arena; Lincoln, Nebraska
December 5, 2026*; 12:00 p.m., TNT/TruTV		at Creighton						CHI Health Center; Omaha, Nebraska
December 8, 2026; 7:00 p.m., BTN		at Penn State						Bryce Jordan Center; State College, Pennsylvania
December 12, 2026*; 6:00 p.m., ESPNU		vs. Missouri						T-Mobile Center; Kansas City, Missouri
December 17, 2026*; 6:00 p.m., BTN		Mount St. Mary's						Pinnacle Bank Arena; Lincoln, Nebraska
December 20, 2026*; 3:00 p.m., BTN		Fairleigh Dickinson						Pinnacle Bank Arena; Lincoln, Nebraska
December 30, 2026*; 1:00 p.m., BTN		New Haven						Pinnacle Bank Arena; Lincoln, Nebraska
January 2, 2027; 2:45 p.m., CBS		Michigan State						Pinnacle Bank Arena; Lincoln, Nebraska
January 5, 2027; 6:00 p.m., NBCSN/Peacock		Michigan						Pinnacle Bank Arena; Lincoln, Nebraska
January 10, 2027; 5:30 p.m., BTN		at Oregon						Matthew Knight Arena; Eugene, Oregon
January 13, 2027; 10:00 p.m., BTN		at Washington						Alaska Airlines Arena; Seattle, Washington
January 16, 2027; 7:00 p.m., FOX/FS1		Iowa						Pinnacle Bank Arena; Lincoln, Nebraksa
January 19, 2027; 8:00 p.m., NBCSN/Peacock		at Illinois						State Farm Center; Champaign, Illinois
January 22, 2027; 8:00 p.m., FS1		UCLA						Pinnacle Bank Arena; Lincoln, Nebraska
January 26, 2027; 5:00 p.m., NBCSN/Peacock		at Purdue						Mackey Arena; West Lafayette, Indiana
January 30, 2027; 4:00 p.m., NBCSN/Peacock		at Iowa						Carver-Hawkeye Arena; Iowa City, Iowa
February 6, 2027; TBA, FOX		Indiana						Pinnacle Bank Arena; Lincoln, Nebraska
February 9, 2027; 5:30 p.m., FS1		at Maryland						Xfinity Center; College Park, Maryland
February 12, 2027; 8:30 p.m., FS1		Penn State						Pinnacle Bank Arena; Lincoln, Nebraska
February 16, 2027; 6:00 p.m., BTN		Rutgers						Pinnacle Bank Arena; Lincoln, Nebraska
February 20, 2027; 7:00 p.m., FOX		at Michigan State						Brelin Center; East Lansing, Michigan
February 23, 2027; 8:00 p.m., NBCSN/Peacock		USC						Pinnacle Bank Arena; Lincoln, Nebraska
February 27, 2027; 2:00 p.m., FOX		at Northwestern						Welsh-Ryan Arena; Evanston, Illinois
March 3, 2027; 7:30 p.m., BTN		at Wisconsin						Kohl Center; Madison, Wisconsin
March 7, 2027; 6:00 p.m., FS1		Minnesota						Pinnacle Bank Arena; Lincoln, Nebraska
Big Ten Tournament
March 10-14, 2027; TBD, TBD		vs. TBD; Big Ten tournament						Gainbridge Fieldhouse; Indianapolis, Indiana
*Non-conference game. ^{#}Rankings from AP poll. (#) Tournament seedings in parentheses. All times are in Central Time.

== Rankings ==
Ranking movements Legend: ██ Increase in ranking ██ Decrease in ranking RV = Received votes
	Week																				
Poll	Pre	1	2	3	4	5	6	7	8	9	10	11	12	13	14	15	16	17	18	19	Final
AP	RV	25	24																		
Coaches	RV	24	20																		
