= 2026 Big Ten men's basketball tournament =

American college basketball postseason tournament

- Classification: Division I
- Season: 2025–26
- Teams: 18
- Site: United Center; Chicago, Illinois
- Champions: Purdue (3rd title)
- Winning coach: Matt Painter (3rd title)
- MVP: Braden Smith (Purdue)
- Television: Peacock/NBCSN, BTN, CBS/Paramount+

2025–26 Big Ten Conference men's basketball standings
	Conf.				Overall
Team	W		L	PCT	W		L	PCT
No. 3 Michigan	19	–	1	.950	35	–	3	.921
No. 15 Nebraska	15	–	5	.750	28	–	7	.800
No. 13 Illinois	15	–	5	.750	28	–	8	.778
No. 11 Michigan State	15	–	5	.750	27	–	8	.771
No. 19 Wisconsin	14	–	6	.700	24	–	11	.686
No. 8 Purdue †	13	–	7	.650	30	–	9	.769
UCLA	13	–	7	.650	24	–	12	.667
Ohio State	12	–	8	.600	21	–	13	.618
Iowa	10	–	10	.500	24	–	13	.649
Indiana	9	–	11	.450	18	–	14	.563
Minnesota	8	–	12	.400	15	–	17	.469
USC	7	–	13	.350	18	–	14	.563
Washington	7	–	13	.350	16	–	17	.485
Rutgers	6	–	14	.300	14	–	19	.424
Northwestern	5	–	15	.250	15	–	19	.441
Oregon	5	–	15	.250	12	–	20	.375
Maryland	4	–	16	.200	12	–	21	.364
Penn State	3	–	17	.150	12	–	20	.375
† 2026 Big Ten tournament winner As of March 29, 2026; Rankings from AP poll

The 2026 Big Ten men's basketball tournament (branded as the 2026 TIAA Big Ten Men's Basketball Tournament for sponsorship reasons) was a postseason men's basketball tournament for the Big Ten Conference in the 2025–26 NCAA Division I men's basketball season. The tournament took place from March 10–15, 2026 at the United Center in Chicago, Illinois. As the tournament winner, Purdue received the conference's automatic bid to the 2026 NCAA tournament.

On September 18, 2025, the Big Ten announced that the tournament would expand to include all 18 teams. In the previous edition, the first since the conference expanded to 18 teams, only the top 15 teams qualified for the tournament.

With a win over Illinois on February 27, 2026, Michigan clinched the number one seed in the tournament.

== Seeds ==
Teams were seeded by conference record, with a tiebreaker system used to seed teams with identical conference records.

Seed	School	Conference record	Tiebreaker
1	Michigan	19–1	
2	Nebraska	15–5	2–1 vs. Michigan State/Illinois
3	Michigan State	15–5	1–1 vs. Nebraska/Illinois
4	Illinois	15–5	1–2 vs. Nebraska/Michigan State
5	Wisconsin	14–6	
6	UCLA	13–7	1–0 vs Purdue
7	Purdue	13–7	0–1 vs UCLA
8	Ohio State	12–8	
9	Iowa	10–10	
10	Indiana	9–11	
11	Minnesota	8–12	
12	Washington	7–13	2–0 vs USC
13	USC	7–13	0–2 vs Washington
14	Rutgers	6–14	
15	Northwestern	5–15	1–0 vs. Oregon
16	Oregon	5–15	0–1 vs. Northwestern
17	Maryland	4–16	
18	Penn State	3–17	

== Schedule ==
Session	Game	Time*	Matchup^{#}	Score	Television	Attendance
First round – Tuesday, March 10
1	1	4:00 p.m.	No. 17 Maryland vs. No. 16 Oregon	70–60	Peacock/NBCSN	15,828
1	2	6:30 p.m.	No. 18 Penn State vs. No. 15 Northwestern	66–76	Peacock/NBCSN	15,828
Second round – Wednesday, March 11
2	3	11:00 a.m.	No. 17 Maryland vs. No. 9 Iowa	64–75	Peacock/NBCSN	15,661
2	4	1:30 p.m.	No. 13 USC vs. No. 12 Washington	79–83^{OT}	Peacock/NBCSN	15,661
3	5	5:30 p.m.	No. 15 Northwestern vs. No. 10 Indiana	74–61	BTN	16,122
3	6	8:00 p.m.	No. 14 Rutgers vs. No. 11 Minnesota	72–67	BTN	16,122
Third round – Thursday, March 12
4	7	11:00 a.m.	No. 9 Iowa vs. No. 8 Ohio State	69–72	BTN	16,157
4	8	1:30 p.m.	No. 12 Washington vs. No. 5 Wisconsin	82–85	BTN	16,157
5	9	5:30 p.m.	No. 15 Northwestern vs. No. 7 Purdue	68–81	BTN	16,861
5	10	8:00 p.m.	No. 14 Rutgers vs. No. 6 UCLA	59–72	BTN	16,861
Quarterfinals – Friday, March 13
6	11	11:00 a.m.	No. 8 Ohio State vs No. 1 Michigan	67–71	BTN	18,988
6	12	1:30 p.m.	No. 5 Wisconsin vs. No. 4 Illinois	91–88^{OT}	BTN	18,988
7	13	5:30 p.m.	No. 7 Purdue vs. No. 2 Nebraska	74–58	BTN	18,238
7	14	8:00 p.m.	No. 6 UCLA vs. No. 3 Michigan State	88–84	BTN	18,238
Semifinals – Saturday, March 14
8	15	12:00 p.m.	No. 1 Michigan vs. No. 5 Wisconsin	68–65	CBS	17,923
8	16	2:30 p.m.	No. 7 Purdue vs. No. 6 UCLA	73–66	CBS	17,923
Championship – Sunday, March 15
9	17	2:30 p.m.	No. 1 Michigan vs. No. 7 Purdue	72–80	CBS	16,807

*Game times in CDT. #Rankings denote tournament seeding.

== Bracket ==
First round Tuesday, March 10; Peacock/NBCSN
16	Oregon	60
17	Maryland	70
15	Northwestern	76
18	Penn State	66

Second round Wednesday, March 11; Peacock/NBCSN/BTN
9	Iowa	75
17	Maryland	64
12	Washington	83*
13	USC	79
10	Indiana	61
15	Northwestern	74
11	Minnesota	67
14	Rutgers	72

Third round Thursday, March 12; BTN
8	Ohio State	72
9	Iowa	69
5	23 Wisconsin	85
12	Washington	82
7	18 Purdue	81
15	Northwestern	68
6	UCLA	72
14	Rutgers	59

Quarterfinals; Friday, March 13; BTN
1	3 Michigan	71
8	Ohio State	67
4	9 Illinois	88
5	23 Wisconsin	91*
2	11 Nebraska	58
7	18 Purdue	74
3	8 Michigan State	84
6	UCLA	88

Semifinals; Saturday, March 14; CBS
1	3 Michigan	68
5	23 Wisconsin	65
7	18 Purdue	73
6	UCLA	66

Championship; Sunday, March 15; CBS
1	3 Michigan	72
7	18 Purdue	80

* denotes overtime period

== Game summaries ==
=== First round ===
Peacock/NBCSN

March 10
4:00 p.m. (CDT)

Report

No. 17 Maryland 70, No. 16 Oregon 60
Scoring by half: 33–12, 37–48
Pts: David Coit, 17; Rebs: Tied, 6 Asts: Andre Mills, 5	Pts: Nate Bittle, 16; Rebs: Kwame Evans Jr., 9 Asts: Takai Simpkins, 5

United Center
Chicago, IL
Attendance: 15,828
Referees: Michael Reed, Kelly Pfiefer, John Floyd

Peacock/NBCSN

March 10
6:30 p.m. (CDT)

Report

No. 15 Northwestern 76, No. 18 Penn State 66
Scoring by half: 34–32, 42–34
Pts: Nick Martinelli, 24; Rebs: Nick Martinelli, 9 Asts: Jayden Reid, 9	Pts: Ivan Jurić, 22; Rebs: Ivan Jurić, 6 Asts: Kayden Mingo, 5

United Center
Chicago, IL
Attendance: 15,828
Referees: Larry Sciotto, Tim Comer, Edwin Young

=== Second round ===
Peacock/NBCSN

March 11
11:00 a.m. (CDT)

No. 17 Maryland 64, No. 9 Iowa 75
Scoring by half: 26–25, 38–50
Pts: Darius Adams, 14; Rebs: Solomon Washington, 13; Asts: Tied, 2	Pts: Cooper Koch, 19; Rebs: Bennett Stirtz, 6 Asts: Bennett Stirtz, 8

United Center
Chicago, IL
Attendance: 15,661
Referees: DJ Carstensen, Larry Scirotto, Edwin Young

Peacock/NBCSN

March 11
1:30 p.m. (CDT)

Report

No. 13 USC 79, No. 12 Washington 83 (OT)
Scoring by half: 40–33, 31–38 Overtime: 8–12
Pts: Kam Woods, 24; Rebs: Tied, 9 Asts: Kam Woods, 7	Pts: Zoom Diallo, 22; Rebs: Hannes Steinbach. 11; Asts: Zoom Diallo, 11

United Center
Chicago, IL
Attendance: 15,661
Referees: Mike Littlewood, Earl Walton, Paul Szelc

BTN

March 11
5:30 p.m. (CDT)

Report

No. 15 Northwestern 74, No. 10 Indiana 61
Scoring by half: 36–37, 38–24
Pts: Nick Martinelli, 28; Rebs: Tied, 5 Asts: Jayden Reid, 6	Pts: Lamar Wilkerson, 17; Rebs: Tucker DeVries, 8 Asts: Tucker DeVries, 6

United Center
Chicago, IL
Attendance: 16,122
Referees: Tim Comer, Keith Kimble, Brian Dorsey

BTN

March 11
8:00 p.m. (CDT)

Report

No. 14 Rutgers 72, No. 11 Minnesota 67
Scoring by half: 29–31, 43–36
Pts: Tariq Francis, 29; Rebs: Emmanuel Ogbole, 7 Asts: Darren Buchanan Jr., 6	Pts: Cade Tyson, 24; Rebs: Langston Reynolds, 7 Asts: Langston Reynolds, 8

United Center
Chicago, IL
Attendance: 16,122
Referees: Jeffrey Anderson, Andy O'Brien, Randy Richardson

=== Third round ===
BTN

March 12
11:00 a.m. (CDT)

Report

No. 9 Iowa 69, No. 8 Ohio State 72
Scoring by half: 30–34, 39–38
Pts: Bennett Stirtz, 17; Rebs: Alvaro Folgueiras, 7 Asts: Bennett Stirtz, 4	Pts: Bruce Thornton, 24; Rebs: Bruce Thornton, 6 Asts: Amare Bynum, 4

United Center
Chicago, IL
Attendance: 16,157
Referees: Brian Dorsey, Jeffrey Anderson, Andy O'Brien

BTN

March 12
1:30 p.m. (CDT)

Report

No. 12 Washington 82, No. 5 Wisconsin 85
Scoring by half: 33–43, 49–42
Pts: Hannes Steinbach, 25; Rebs: Hannes Steinbach, 16; Asts: Zoom Diallo, 7	Pts: John Blackwell, 34; Rebs: John Blackwell, 10; Asts: Nick Boyd, 9

United Center
Chicago, IL
Attendance: 16,157
Referees: Keith Kimble, DJ Carstensen, Earl Walton

BTN

March 12
5:30 p.m. (CDT)

Report

No. 15 Northwestern 68, No. 7 Purdue 81
Scoring by half: 21–45, 47–36
Pts: Nick Martinelli, 25; Rebs: Tre Singleton, 5 Asts: Jayden Reid, 9	Pts: Tied, 19; Rebs: Oscar Cluff, 10; Asts: Braden Smith, 16

United Center
Chicago, IL
Attendance: 16,861
Referees: Paul Szelc, Kelly Pfeifer, Randy Richardson

BTN

March 12
8:00 p.m. (CDT)

Report

No. 14 Rutgers 59, No. 6 UCLA 72
Scoring by half: 24–30, 35–42
Pts: Lino Mark, 17; Rebs: Darren Buchanan Jr., 9 Asts: Tied, 5	Pts: Tyler Bilodeau, 21; Rebs: Donovan Dent, 10; Asts: Donovan Dent, 12

United Center
Chicago, IL
Attendance: 16,861
Referees: Mike Littlewood, Edwin Young, Michael Reid

=== Quarterfinals ===
BTN

March 13
11:00 a.m. (CDT)

Report

No. 8 Ohio State 67, No. 1 Michigan 71
Scoring by half: 35–39, 32–32
Pts: Bruce Thornton, 22; Rebs: Devin Royal, 11; Asts: Bruce Thornton, 4	Pts: Aday Mara, 17; Rebs: Tied, 7 Asts: Yaxel Lendeborg, 6

United Center
Chicago, IL
Attendance: 18,988
Referees: DJ Carstensen, Randy Richardson, Kelly Pfeifer

BTN

March 13
1:30 p.m. (CDT)

Report

No. 5 Wisconsin 91, No. 4 Illinois 88
Scoring by half: 30–36, 48–42
Pts: Nick Boyd, 38; Rebs: Tied, 9 Asts: Nick Boyd, 6	Pts: Tied, 19; Rebs: Tied, 7 Asts: Keaton Wagler, 8

United Center
Chicago, IL
Attendance: 18,988
Referees: Brian Dorsey, Michael Reed, Tim Comer

BTN

March 13
5:30 p.m. (CDT)

Report

No. 7 Purdue 74, No. 2 Nebraska 58
Scoring by half: 41–28, 33–30
Pts: Fletcher Loyer, 19; Rebs: Tied, 9 Asts: Braden Smith, 10	Pts: Pryce Sandfort, 15; Rebs: Sam Hoiberg, 8 Asts: Sam Hoiberg, 4

United Center
Chicago, IL
Attendance: 18,238
Referees: Larry Scirotto, Earl Walton, Keith Kimble

BTN

March 13
8:00 p.m. (CDT)

Report

No. 6 UCLA 88, No. 3 Michigan State 84
Scoring by half: 44–33, 44–51
Pts: Donovan Dent, 23; Rebs: Eric Dailey Jr., 10; Asts: Donovan Dent, 12	Pts: Jeremy Fears Jr., 21; Rebs: Coen Carr, 8 Asts: Jeremy Fears Jr., 13

United Center
Chicago, IL
Attendance: 18,238
Referees: Mike Littlewood, Paul Szelc, Jeff Anderson

=== Semifinals ===
CBS

March 14
12:00 p.m. (CDT)

Report

No. 1 Michigan 68, No. 5 Wisconsin 65
Scoring by half: 28–28, 40–37
Pts: Aday Mara, 16; Rebs: Aday Mara, 8 Asts: Tied, 2	Pts: Austin Rapp, 18; Rebs: Tied, 2 Asts: Nick Boyd, 5

United Center
Chicago, IL
Attendance: 17,923
Referees: Mike Littlewood, Larry Scirotto, Jeff Anderson

CBS

March 14
2:30 p.m. (CDT)

Report

No. 7 Purdue 73, No. 6 UCLA 66
Scoring by half: 34–27, 39–39
Pts: Oscar Cluff, 17; Rebs: Oscar Cluff, 14; Asts: Braden Smith, 9	Pts: Trent Perry, 15; Rebs: Eric Dailey Jr., 10; Asts: Trent Perry, 9

United Center
Chicago, IL
Attendance: 17,923
Referees: Paul Szelc, Michael Reed, Earl Walton

=== Championship ===
CBS

March 15
2:30 p.m. (CDT)

No. 1 Michigan 72, No. 7 Purdue 80
Scoring by half: 38–38, 34–42
Pts: Yaxel Lendeborg, 20; Rebs: Aday Mara, 7 Asts: Elliot Cadeau, 10	Pts: Oscar Cluff, 21; Rebs: Tied, 5 Asts: Braden Smith, 11

United Center
Chicago, IL
Attendance: 16,807
Referees: DJ Carstensen, Keith Kimble, Brian Dorsey

== All-Tournament team ==
The All-tournament team was as follows:

- Aday Mara, Michigan
- Oscar Cluff, Purdue
- Braden Smith, Purdue
- John Blackwell, Wisconsin
- Nick Boyd, Wisconsin
