= 2025–26 Big Ten Conference men's basketball season =

- League: NCAA Division I
- Sport: Basketball
- Teams: 18
- TV partner(s): Big Ten Network, Fox, FS1, CBS, Peacock, NBC, NBCSN

2025–26 NCAA Division I men's basketball season
- Regular season champions: Michigan
- Season MVP: Yaxel Lendeborg
- Top scorer: Nick Martinelli

Tournament
- Venue: United Center, Chicago, Illinois
- Champions: Purdue
- Runners-up: Michigan

Basketball seasons
- 2024–25 2026–27

2025–26 Big Ten Conference men's basketball standings
	Conf.				Overall
Team	W		L	PCT	W		L	PCT
No. 1 Michigan	19	–	1	.950	37	–	3	.925
No. 14 Nebraska	15	–	5	.750	28	–	7	.800
No. 5 Illinois	15	–	5	.750	28	–	9	.757
No. 11 Michigan State	15	–	5	.750	27	–	8	.771
No. 25 Wisconsin	14	–	6	.700	24	–	11	.686
No. 6 Purdue †	13	–	7	.650	30	–	9	.769
UCLA	13	–	7	.650	24	–	12	.667
Ohio State	12	–	8	.600	21	–	13	.618
No. 15 Iowa	10	–	10	.500	24	–	13	.649
Indiana	9	–	11	.450	18	–	14	.563
Minnesota	8	–	12	.400	15	–	18	.455
USC	7	–	13	.350	18	–	14	.563
Washington	7	–	13	.350	16	–	17	.485
Rutgers	6	–	14	.300	14	–	20	.412
Northwestern	5	–	15	.250	15	–	19	.441
Oregon	5	–	15	.250	12	–	20	.375
Maryland	4	–	16	.200	12	–	21	.364
Penn State	3	–	17	.150	12	–	20	.375
† 2026 Big Ten tournament winner Rankings from AP poll

The 2025–26 Big Ten men's basketball season is for the Big Ten Conference in the 2025–26 NCAA Division I men's basketball season. The teams began practicing in October 2025, and started the season in November 2025. The regular season concluded on March 8, 2026.

Purdue was the preseason AP and Coaches Poll No. 1 ranked team for the first time in school history.

On February 24, 2026, Michigan clinched at least a share of the regular season championship with a win against Minnesota. On February 27, Michigan secured the outright Big Ten title against Illinois on the road. It was the Wolverines first regular season championship since 2021. Michigan finished the regular season with a 19–1 record in the conference, setting a Big Ten record for the most wins while surpassing the 1974–75 and 1975–76 Indiana Hoosiers (18–0).

Michigan forward Yaxel Lendeborg was named Big Ten Conference Men's Basketball Player of the Year. Michigan's head coach Dusty May (media) and Nebraska's Fred Hoiberg (coaches) were named the co-Big Ten Conference Men's Basketball Coach of the Year.

The Big Ten tournament was held from March 10 through March 15 at United Center in Chicago. Purdue defeated the defending champions, Michigan, to win the tournament.

Purdue received the conference's automatic bid to the NCAA tournament. In addition, Illinois, Iowa, Michigan, Michigan State, Nebraska, Ohio State, UCLA, and Wisconsin received at-large bids to the tournament. Through the Sweet Sixteen, the Big Ten had a combined 17–5 record and advanced four teams to the Elite Eight; Illinois, Iowa, Michigan, and Purdue. The SEC in 2025 is the only other conference in NCAA tournament history to do so. Illinois won the South Region, and Michigan won the Midwest Region, as the Big Ten advanced two teams to the Final Four for the fourth time since 2000. Michigan advanced to the national championship game, defeating UConn to win the Big Ten's first national title since Michigan State in 2000.

== Head coaches ==
=== Coaching changes ===
==== Indiana ====
On February 8, 2025, the school announced that head coach Mike Woodson would not return as head coach. On March 18, the school named West Virginia head coach Darian DeVries the team's new head coach.

==== Iowa ====
On March 14, 2025, the school fired head coach Fran McCaffery after 15 seasons. He finished with a 297–207 overall record with Iowa. On March 24, the school named Drake head coach Ben McCollum the team's new coach.

==== Maryland ====
Following the season, head coach Kevin Willard left the team to take the head coaching position at Villanova. On April 1, the school named Texas A&M head coach Buzz Williams the team's new head coach.

==== Minnesota ====
On March 13, 2025, the school fired head coach Ben Johnson. On March 24, the school named Colorado State head coach Niko Medved the team's new coach.

=== Coaches ===
Team	Head coach	Previous job	Years at school	Overall record	Big Ten record	Big Ten titles	Big Ten tournament titles	NCAA Tournaments	NCAA Final Fours	NCAA Championships
Illinois	Brad Underwood	Oklahoma State	9	165–101 (.620)	92–66 (.582)	1	2	5	0	0
Indiana	Darian DeVries	West Virginia	1	0–0 (–)	0–0 (–)	0	0	0	0	0
Iowa	Ben McCollum	Drake	1	0–0 (–)	0–0 (–)	0	0	0	0	0
Maryland	Buzz Williams	Texas A&M	1	0–0 (–)	0–0 (–)	0	0	0	0	0
Michigan	Dusty May	Florida Atlantic	2	27–10 (.730)	14–6 (.700)	0	1	1	0	0
Michigan State	Tom Izzo	Michigan State (Asst.)	31	737–302 (.709)	361–173 (.676)	11	6	27	8	1
Minnesota	Niko Medved	Colorado State	1	0–0 (–)	0–0 (–)	0	0	0	0	0
Nebraska	Fred Hoiberg	Chicago Bulls	7	84–108 (.438)	37–82 (.311)	0	0	1	0	0
Northwestern	Chris Collins	Duke (Asst.)	13	194–190 (.505)	87–142 (.380)	0	0	3	0	0
Ohio State	Jake Diebler	Ohio State (Assoc.)	3	25–18 (.581)	9–11 (.450)	0	0	0	0	0
Oregon	Dana Altman	Creighton	16	370–162 (.695)	12–8 (.600)	0	0	9	1	0
Penn State	Mike Rhoades	VCU	3	32–32 (.500)	15–25 (.375)	0	0	0	0	0
Purdue	Matt Painter	Purdue (Assoc.)	21	471–215 (.687)	238–129 (.649)	5	2	15	1	0
Rutgers	Steve Pikiell	Stony Brook	10	147–140 (.512)	71–105 (.403)	0	0	2	0	0
UCLA	Mick Cronin	Cincinnati	7	138–64 (.683)	13–7 (.650)	0	0	4	1	0
USC	Eric Musselman	Arkansas	2	17–18 (.486)	7–13 (.350)	0	0	0	0	0
Washington	Danny Sprinkle	Utah State	2	13–18 (.419)	4–16 (.200)	0	0	0	0	0
Wisconsin	Greg Gard	Wisconsin (Assoc.)	11	212–117 (.644)	117–77 (.603)	2	0	7	0	0

Notes:

- All records, appearances, titles, etc. are from time as head coach with current school only.
- Year at school includes 2025–26 season.
- Overall and Big Ten records are from time as head coach at current school only and are through the beginning of the season.

== Preseason ==
=== Preseason Big Ten poll ===
The Big Ten Media poll was released on October 7, 2025.

Rank	Team
1	Purdue
2	Michigan
3	UCLA
4	Illinois
5	Oregon
6	Michigan State
7	Wisconsin
8	Iowa
9	Ohio State
10	Indiana
11	Washington
12	USC
13	Maryland
14	Nebraska
15	Northwestern
16	Minnesota
17	Rutgers
18	Penn State

=== Preseason All-Big Ten ===
A select media panel named a preseason All-Big Ten team and player of the year.

Honor	Recipient
Preseason Player of the Year	Braden Smith, Purdue
Preseason All-Big Ten Team	Bennett Stirtz, Iowa
Preseason All-Big Ten Team	Yaxel Lendeborg, Michigan
Preseason All-Big Ten Team	Nick Martinelli, Northwestern
Preseason All-Big Ten Team	Bruce Thornton, Ohio State
Preseason All-Big Ten Team	Nate Bittle, Oregon
Preseason All-Big Ten Team	Jackson Shelstad, Oregon
Preseason All-Big Ten Team	Trey Kaufman-Renn, Purdue
Preseason All-Big Ten Team	Braden Smith, Purdue
Preseason All-Big Ten Team	Donovan Dent, UCLA
Preseason All-Big Ten Team	John Blackwell, Wisconsin

=== Preseason national polls ===
	AP	Blue Ribbon Yearbook	CBS Sports	Coaches	ESPN	FOX Sports	Lindy's Sports	Sporting News	Sports Illustrated
Illinois	17	20	24	14	16	20	23	13	15
Indiana									
Iowa							31		25
Maryland									
Michigan	7	9	8	7	8	6	4	11	11
Michigan State	22		16	21	27	18	25		22
Minnesota									
Nebraska									
Northwestern									
Ohio State							38		
Oregon						25	17		30
Penn State									
Purdue	1	2	4	1	1	1	2	2	5
Rutgers									
UCLA	12	12	10	12	15	12	16	10	19
USC					30				
Washington									
Wisconsin	24	21	26	24	20	21	33	18	23

=== Preseason watchlists ===
Below is a table of notable preseason watch lists.

Player	Wooden	Naismith	Naismith DPOY	Robertson	Cousy	West	Erving	Malone	Abdul-Jabbar
Chad Baker-Mazara, USC							✓		
Tyler Bilodeau, UCLA								✓	
Nate Bittle, Oregon	✓	✓		✓					✓
John Blackwell, Wisconsin	✓	✓		✓		✓			
Kylan Boswell, Illinois						✓			
Elliot Cadeau, Michigan					✓				
Coen Carr, Michigan State							✓		
Oscar Cluff, Purdue									✓
Eric Dailey Jr., UCLA							✓		
Donovan Dent, UCLA	✓	✓		✓	✓				
Tucker DeVries, Indiana	✓	✓		✓			✓		
Alvaro Folgueiras, Iowa								✓	
Tomislav Ivišić, Illinois		✓		✓					✓
Trey Kaufman-Renn, Purdue	✓	✓		✓				✓	
Yaxel Lendeborg, Michigan	✓	✓		✓				✓	
Fletcher Loyer, Purdue							✓		
Aday Mara, Michigan									✓
Rienk Mast, Nebraska									✓
Nick Martinelli, Northwestern	✓	✓		✓				✓	
Rodney Rice, USC						✓			
Devin Royal, Ohio State							✓		
Jackson Shelstad, Oregon	✓	✓		✓					
Braden Smith, Purdue	✓	✓		✓	✓				
Bennett Stirtz, Iowa	✓	✓		✓	✓				
Andrej Stojaković, Illinois	✓	✓					✓		
Bruce Thornton, Ohio State	✓	✓		✓	✓				
Wesley Yates III, Washington						✓			

=== Preseason All-American teams ===
Player	AP	CBS	USA Today	Sports Illustrated	SB Nation	Sporting News
Braden Smith, Purdue	1st team	1st team	1st team	1st team	1st team	1st team
Yaxel Lendeborg , Michigan	1st team	2nd team	2nd team	2nd team	1st team	2nd team
Trey Kaufman-Renn, Purdue		1st team		2nd team	2nd team	3rd team
Donovan Dent, UCLA		1st team		2nd team	1st team	2nd team
Bennett Stirtz, Iowa		2nd team		2nd team	3rd team	

== Regular season ==
=== Rankings ===
Legend
	Improvement in ranking
	Drop in ranking
	Not ranked previous week
RV	Received votes but were not ranked in Top 25 of poll
(Italics)	Number of first place votes

		Pre/ Wk 1	Wk 2	Wk 3	Wk 4	Wk 5	Wk 6	Wk 7	Wk 8	Wk 9	Wk 10	Wk 11	Wk 12	Wk 13	Wk 14	Wk 15	Wk 16	Wk 17	Wk 18	Wk 19	Wk 20	Final
Illinois	AP	17	14	8	13	14	13	18	20	20*	16	13	11	9	5	8	10	10	11	9	13	5
Illinois	C	14	14	8	14	15	13	18	19	19	16	13	11	10	6	7	10	11	11	9	12	5
Indiana	AP	RV	RV	RV	25	22	RV	RV	RV	RV*	RV											
Indiana	C		RV	25	24	19T			RV	RV	RV	RV										
Iowa	AP	RV	RV	RV	RV	RV	RV	RV	25	25*	19	RV	RV	RV	RV	RV		RV				15
Iowa	C	RV	RV	RV	RV	25	23	25	23	23	19	23	RV	25	RV	25	RV	RV				19
Maryland	AP									*												
Maryland	C																					
Michigan	AP	7	6	7	7	3 (15)	2 (19)	2 (15)	2 (19)	2 (19)*	2 (29)	4	3	3	2	2	1 (60)	3	3	3 (1)	3	1 (57)
Michigan	C	7	5	6	6	2 (6)	1 (17)	1 (16)	1 (20)	1 (20)	1 (24)	3 (1)	2	2	2	2 (1)	1 (31)	3	3	3	3	1 (31)
Michigan State	AP	22	17	17	11	7	9	9	9	9*	12	12	10	7	10	10	15	13	8	8	11	11
Michigan State	C	21	17	18	12	8	9	9	9	9	13	12	10	8	10	10	15	13	8	8	11	11
Minnesota	AP									*												
Minnesota	C																					
Nebraska	AP				RV	RV	23	15	13	13*	10	8	7	5	9	7	9	12	9	11	15	14
Nebraska	C				RV	RV	22	15	13	13	11	10	7	5	9	8	9	10	9	10	14	14
Northwestern	AP									*												
Northwestern	C																					
Ohio State	AP	RV	RV	RV	RV					*									RV	RV	RV	RV
Ohio State	C	RV	RV	RV	RV		RV	RV				RV								RV	RV	
Oregon	AP	RV	RV	RV	RV					*												
Oregon	C	RV	RV	RV	RV																	
Penn State	AP									*												
Penn State	C																					
Purdue	AP	1 (35)	2 (36)	1 (44)	1 (46)	1 (40)	6	6	5	5*	5	5	4	12	12	13	7	8	15	18	8	6
Purdue	C	1 (18)	1 (21)	1 (20)	1 (23)	1 (21)	6	6	5	6	5	5	4	12	12	12	7	8	14	18	13	7
Rutgers	AP									*												
Rutgers	C																					
UCLA	AP	12	15	19	18	RV	25	RV	RV	RV*	RV									RV	RV	RV
UCLA	C	12	15	20	19	RV	RV	RV	RV	RV										RV	RV	RV
USC	AP	RV	RV	RV	RV	24			24	24*	RV	RV										
USC	C	RV	RV	RV	RV	RV	RV	RV	25	RV	RV	RV										
Washington	AP	RV								*												
Washington	C	RV																				
Wisconsin	AP	24	24	23	RV	RV	RV	RV		*		RV	RV	RV	RV		24	RV	RV	23	19	25
Wisconsin	C	24	22	21	RV	RV	RV	RV				RV	RV				25	RV	RV	23	20	25

*AP did not release a week 9 poll.

=== Players of the week ===
Throughout the conference regular season, the Big Ten offices will name one or two players of the week and one or two freshmen of the week each Monday.

Week	Date	Player of the week	School	Freshman of the week	School
1	November 10, 2025	Tucker DeVries	Indiana	David Mirković	Illinois
1	November 10, 2025	Bruce Thornton	Ohio State	David Mirković	Illinois
2	November 17, 2025	Braden Smith	Purdue	David Mirkovic (2)	Illinois
3	November 24, 2025	Diggy Coit	Maryland	Braden Frager	Nebraska
4	December 1, 2025	Yaxel Lendeborg	Michigan	Kayden Mingo	Penn State
5	December 8, 2025	John Blackwell	Wisconsin	Hannes Steinbach	Washington
6	December 15, 2025	Pryce Sandfort	Nebraska	Keaton Wagler	Illinois
6	December 15, 2025	Lamar Wilkerson	Indiana	Keaton Wagler	Illinois
7	December 22, 2025	Skyy Clark	UCLA	Braden Frager (2)	Nebraska
7	December 22, 2025	Tariq Francis	Rutgers	Braden Frager (2)	Nebraska
8	December 29, 2025	Not Awarded			
9	January 5, 2026	Morez Johnson Jr.	Michigan	Keaton Wagler (2)	Illinois
9	January 5, 2026	Braden Smith (2)	Purdue	Hannes Steinbach (2)	Washington
10	January 12, 2026	Nick Boyd	Wisconsin	Keaton Wagler (3)	Illinois
10	January 12, 2026	Braden Smith (3)	Purdue	Keaton Wagler (3)	Illinois
11	January 19, 2026	Diggy Coit (2)	Maryland	Braden Frager (3)	Nebraska
11	January 19, 2026	John Blackwell (2)	Wisconsin	Braden Frager (3)	Nebraska
12	January 26, 2026	Jeremy Fears Jr.	Michigan State	Keaton Wagler (4)	Illinois
12	January 26, 2026	Keaton Wagler	Illinois	Keaton Wagler (4)	Illinois
13	February 2, 2026	Bennett Stirtz	Iowa	Keaton Wagler (5)	Illinois
13	February 2, 2026	Jeremy Fears Jr. (2)	Michigan State	Keaton Wagler (5)	Illinois
14	February 9, 2026	Lamar Wilkerson (2)	Indiana	Alijah Arenas	USC
14	February 9, 2026	Bennett Stirtz (2)	Iowa	Alijah Arenas	USC
15	February 16, 2026	Nick Boyd (2)	Wisconsin	Keaton Wagler (6)	Illinois
16	February 23, 2026	Bruce Thornton (2)	Ohio State	Andre Mills	Maryland
17	March 2, 2026	Pryce Sandfort (2)	Nebraska	Hannes Steinbach (3)	Washington
17	March 2, 2026	Nick Martinelli	Northwestern	Hannes Steinbach (3)	Washington
18	March 9, 2026	Bruce Thornton (3)	Ohio State	Hannes Steinbach (4)	Washington

=== Early season tournaments ===
Of the 18 Big Ten teams, 11 participated in early season bracketed tournaments.

Team	Tournament	Finish
Iowa	Acrisure Series (Classic)	1st
Maryland	Players Era Festival	Lost consolation game
Michigan	Players Era Festival	1st
Minnesota	Acrisure Series (Invitational)	4th
Nebraska	Hall of Fame Classic	1st
Oregon	Players Era Festival	Lost consolation game
Purdue	Bahamas Championship	1st
Rutgers	Players Era Festival	Won consolation game
USC	Maui Invitational	1st
Washington	Acrisure Series (Holiday Classic)	2nd
Wisconsin	Rady Children's Invitational	2nd

=== Conference matrix ===
This table summarizes the head-to-head results between teams in conference play. Each team played 20 conference games with at least one game against each opponent.

	Illinois	Indiana	Iowa	Maryland	Michigan	Michigan St	Minnesota	Nebraska	Northwestern	Ohio St	Oregon	Penn St	Purdue	Rutgers	UCLA	USC	Washington	Wisconsin
vs. Illinois	–	0–1	0–1	0–2	1–0	1–0	0–1	1–1	0–2	0–1	0–1	0–1	0–1	0–1	1–0	0–1	0–1	1–0
vs. Indiana	1–0	–	1–0	0–1	1–0	1–0	1–1	1–0	1–0	1–0	0–1	0–1	1–1	0–1	0–1	1–0	0–1	0–1
vs. Iowa	1–0	0–1	–	1–1	1–0	1–0	1–0	1–1	0–1	0–1	0–1	1–0	2–0	0–1	0–1	0–1	0–1	1–0
vs. Maryland	2–0	1–0	1–1	–	1–0	1–0	0–1	1–0	1–0	1–0	1–0	0–1	1–0	2–0	1–0	1–0	0–1	1–0
vs. Michigan	0–1	0–1	0–1	0–1	–	0–2	0–1	0–1	0–1	0–2	0–1	0–2	0–1	0–1	0–1	0–1	0–	1–0
vs. Michigan St	0–1	0–2	0–1	0–1	2–0	–	1–0	1–0	0–1	0–1	0–1	0–1	0–1	0–2	0–1	0–1	0–1	1–0
vs. Minnesota	1–0	1–1	0–1	1–0	1–0	0–1	–	1–0	0–2	1–0	0–1	1–0	1–0	0–1	0–1	1–0	1–0	2–0
vs. Nebraska	1–1	0–1	1–1	0–1	1–0	0–1	0–1	–	0–2	0–1	0–1	0–1	1–0	0–1	0–0	0–1	0–1	0–1
vs. Northwestern	2–0	0–1	1–0	0–1	1–0	1–0	2–0	2–0	–	1–0	0–1	0–1	1–0	1–0	2–0	0–1	1–0	1–0
vs. Ohio State	1–0	0–1	1–0	0–1	2–0	1–0	0–1	1–0	0–1	–	0–1	0–2	0–1	0–1	0–1	0–1	1–0	1–1
vs. Oregon	1–0	1–0	1–0	0–1	1–0	1–0	1–0	1–0	1–0	1–0	–	0–1	1–0	1–0	2–0	1–1	1–1	0–1
vs. Penn State	1–0	1–0	0–1	1–0	1–0	1–0	0–1	1–0	1–0	2–0	1–0	–	1–0	2–0	1–0	1–0	0–1	1–0
vs. Purdue	1–0	1–1	0–2	0–1	1–0	1–0	0–1	0–1	0–1	1–0	0–1	0–1	–	0–1	1–0	0–1	0–1	1–1
vs. Rutgers	1–0	1–0	1–0	0–1	1–0	2–0	1–0	1–0	0–1	1–0	0–1	0–2	1–0	–	1–0	1–0	1–0	1–0
vs. UCLA	0–1	1–0	1–0	0–1	1–0	1–0	1–0	0–1	0–1	1–0	0–2	0–1	0–1	0–1	–	0–2	0–2	1–0
vs. USC	1–0	0–1	1–0	0–1	1–0	1–0	0–1	1–0	1–0	1–0	1–1	0–1	1–0	0–1	2–0	–	2–0	0–1
vs. Washington	1–0	1–0	1–0	1–0	1–0	1–0	0–1	1–0	0–1	0–1	0–1	1–0	1–0	0–1	2–0	0–2	–	1–0
vs. Wisconsin	0–1	1–0	0–1	0–1	0–1	0–1	0–2	1–0	0–2	1–1	2–0	0–1	1–1	0–1	0–1	1–0	0–1	–
Total	15–5	9–11	10–10	4–16	19–1	15–5	8–12	15–5	5–15	12–8	5–15	3–17	13–7	6–14	13–7	7–13	7–13	14–6

Through March 2, 2026

=== All-Big Ten awards and teams ===
On March 10, 2025, the Big Ten announced most of its conference awards.

Honor	Coaches	Media
Player of the Year	Yaxel Lendeborg, Michigan	Yaxel Lendeborg, Michigan
Coach of the Year	Fred Hoiberg, Nebraska	Dusty May, Michigan
Freshman of the Year	Keaton Wagler, Illinois	Keaton Wagler, Illinois
Defensive Players of the Year	Aday Mara, Michigan	Not selected
Sixth Man of the Year	Breden Frager, Nebraska	Not selected
All-Big Ten First Team	Keaton Wagler, Illinois	Keaton Wagler, Illinois
All-Big Ten First Team	Yaxel Lendeborg, Michigan	Yaxel Lendeborg, Michigan
All-Big Ten First Team	Jeremy Fears Jr., Michigan State	Jeremy Fears Jr., Michigan State
All-Big Ten First Team	Braden Smith, Purdue	Braden Smith, Purdue
All-Big Ten First Team	Pryce Sandfort, Nebraska	Bennett Stirtz, Iowa
All-Big Ten Second Team	Nick Martinelli, Northwestern	Nick Martinelli, Northwestern
All-Big Ten Second Team	Bruce Thornton, Ohio State	Bruce Thornton, Ohio State
All-Big Ten Second Team	Nick Boyd, Wisconsin	Nick Boyd, Wisconsin
All-Big Ten Second Team	Lamar Wilkerson, Indiana	Morez Johnson Jr., Michigan
All-Big Ten Second Team	Bennett Stirtz, Iowa	Pryce Sandfort, Nebraska
All-Big Ten Third Team	Aday Mara, Michigan	Aday Mara, Michigan
All-Big Ten Third Team	Tyler Bilodeau, UCLA	Tyler Bilodeau, UCLA
All-Big Ten Third Team	Hannes Steinbach, Washington	Hannes Steinbach, Washington
All-Big Ten Third Team	John Blackwell, Wisconsin	John Blackwell, Wisconsin
All-Big Ten Third Team	Morez Johnson Jr., Michigan	Lamar Wilkerson, Indiana
All-Big Ten Honorable Mention	David Mirkovic, Illinois	David Mirkovic, Illinois
All-Big Ten Honorable Mention	Cade Tyson, Minnesota	Cade Tyson, Minnesota
All-Big Ten Honorable Mention	Sam Hoiberg, Nebraska	Sam Hoiberg, Nebraska
All-Big Ten Honorable Mention	Jaxon Kohler, Michigan State	Jaxon Kohler, Michigan State
All-Big Ten Honorable Mention	Donovan Dent, UCLA	Donovan Dent, UCLA
All-Big Ten Honorable Mention	Trey Kaufman-Renn, Purdue	Trey Kaufman-Renn, Purdue
All-Big Ten Honorable Mention	Rienk Mast, Nebraska	Rienk Mast, Nebraska
All-Big Ten Honorable Mention	Not selected	Kylan Boswell, Illinois
All-Big Ten Honorable Mention	Not selected	Elliot Cadeau, Michigan
All-Big Ten Honorable Mention	Not selected	John Mobley Jr., Ohio State
All-Big Ten Honorable Mention	Not selected	Tariq Francis, Rutgers
All-Freshman Team	Keaton Wagler, Illinois	Not selected
All-Freshman Team	David Mirkovic, Illinois	Not selected
All-Freshman Team	Trey McKenney, Michigan	Not selected
All-Freshman Team	Braden Frager, Nebraska	Not selected
All-Freshman Team	Hannes Steinbach, Washington	Not selected
All-Defensive Team	Aday Mara, Michigan	Not selected
All-Defensive Team	Yaxel Lendeborg, Michigan	Not selected
All-Defensive Team	Morez Johnson Jr., Michigan	Not selected
All-Defensive Team	Kylan Boswell, Illinois	Not selected
All-Defensive Team	Sam Hoiberg, Nebraska	Not selected

== Postseason ==
=== Big Ten tournament ===
First round Tuesday, March 10; Peacock/NBCSN
16	Oregon	60
17	Maryland	70
15	Northwestern	76
18	Penn State	66

Second round Wednesday, March 11; Peacock/NBCSN/BTN
9	Iowa	75
17	Maryland	64
12	Washington	83*
13	USC	79
10	Indiana	61
15	Northwestern	74
11	Minnesota	67
14	Rutgers	72

Third round Thursday, March 12; BTN
8	Ohio State	72
9	Iowa	69
5	23 Wisconsin	85
12	Washington	82
7	18 Purdue	81
15	Northwestern	68
6	UCLA	72
14	Rutgers	59

Quarterfinals; Friday, March 13; BTN
1	3 Michigan	71
8	Ohio State	67
4	9 Illinois	88
5	23 Wisconsin	91*
2	11 Nebraska	58
7	18 Purdue	74
3	8 Michigan State	84
6	UCLA	88

Semifinals; Saturday, March 14; CBS
1	3 Michigan	68
5	23 Wisconsin	65
7	18 Purdue	73
6	UCLA	66

Championship; Sunday, March 15; CBS
1	3 Michigan	72
7	18 Purdue	80

* denotes overtime period

Unlike the previous edition, the tournament has been expanded to include all 18 teams, occurring over six days instead of five.

=== NCAA tournament ===
Seed	Region	School	First round	Second round	Sweet 16	Elite Eight	Final Four	Championship
1	Midwest	Michigan	W 101–80 vs. (16) Howard	W 95–72 vs. (9) Saint Louis	W 90–77 vs. (4) Alabama	W 95–62 vs. (6) Tennessee	W 91–73 vs. (W1) Arizona	W 69–63 vs. (E2) UConn
2	West	Purdue	W 104–71 vs. (15) Queens	W 79–69 vs. (7) Miami (FL)	W 79–77 vs. (11) Texas	L 64–79 vs. (1) Arizona	DNP	
3	South	Illinois	W 105–70 vs. (14) Penn	W 76–55 vs. (11) VCU	W 65–55 vs. (2) Houston	W 71–59 vs. (9) Iowa	L 62–71 vs. (E2) UConn	DNP
3	East	Michigan State	W 92–67 vs. (14) North Dakota State	W 77–69 vs. (6) Louisville	L 63–67 vs. (2) UConn	DNP		
4	South	Nebraska	W 76–47 vs. (13) Troy	W 74–72 vs. (5) Vanderbilt	L 71–77 vs. (9) Iowa	DNP		
5	West	Wisconsin	L 82–83 vs. (12) High Point	DNP				
7	East	UCLA	W 75–71 vs. (10) UCF	L 57–73 vs. (2) UConn	DNP			
8	East	Ohio State	L 64–66 vs. (9) TCU	DNP				
9	South	Iowa	W 67–61 vs. (8) Clemson	W 73–72 vs. (1) Florida	W 77–71 vs. (4) Nebraska	L 59–71 vs. (3) Illinois	DNP	
		W–L (%):	7–2 (.778)	6–1 (.857)	4–2 (.667)	2–2 (.500)	1–1 (.500)	1–0 (1.000)
Total: 21–8 (.724)

=== CBC ===
School	Quarterfinals	Semifinals	Final
Minnesota	L 48–67 vs. Baylor	DNP	
Rutgers	L 69–82 vs. Creighton	DNP	
W-L (%):	0–2 (.000)	0–0 (–)	0–0 (–)
Total: 0–2 (.000)

=== NIT ===
No Big Ten teams participated in 2026.

== NBA draft ==
PG	Point guard	SG	Shooting guard	SF	Small forward	PF	Power forward	C	Center

Rnd.	Pick	Player	Pos.	Nationality (Note: Nationality indicates the player's national team or representative nationality. If a player has not competed at the international level, then the nationality indicates the national team which the player is eligible to represent according to FIBA rules.)	Team	School / club team
1	5	Keaton Wagler	SG/PG	United States	Los Angeles Clippers (from Indiana) (Note: February 5, 2026: Indiana Pacers to Los Angeles Clippers: L.A. Clippers acquired Bennedict Mathurin, Isaiah Jackson, 2026 and 2029 IND first-round picks, and 2028 DAL second-round pick; Indiana acquired Ivica Zubac and Kobe Brown)	Illinois (Fr.)
1	9	Morez Johnson Jr.	PF/C	United States	Dallas Mavericks	Michigan (So.)
1	11	Yaxel Lendeborg	PF	Dominican Republic; United States	Golden State Warriors	Michigan (Sr.)
1	12	Aday Mara	C	Spain	Oklahoma City Thunder (from L.A. Clippers) (Note: July 10, 2019: Los Angeles Clippers to Oklahoma City Thunder: Oklahoma City acquired Shai Gilgeous-Alexander; Danilo Gallinari; 2022, 2024, and 2026 first-round picks; 2021 and 2023 MIA first-round picks; and right to swap 2023 and 2025 first-round picks; L.A. Clippers acquired Paul George)	Michigan (Jr.)
1	14	Hannes Steinbach	PF	Germany	Charlotte Hornets	Washington (Fr.)
1	16	Bennett Stirtz	PG	United States	Memphis Grizzlies (from Phoenix via Orlando, (Note: July 17, 2023: Phoenix Suns to Orlando Magic: Orlando acquired 2026 first-round pick swap; Phoenix acquired 2024 DEN second-round pick, 2026 second-round pick, and 2028 BOS protected second-round pick; June 27, 2025: Orlando Magic to Memphis Grizzlies: Memphis acquired Kentavious Caldwell-Pope; Cole Anthony; 2025, 2028, and 2030 ORL first-round picks; 2026 first-round pick; and 2029 ORL first-round pick swap; Orlando acquired Desmond Bane) traded to Oklahoma City) (Note: June 23, 2026: Memphis Grizzlies to Oklahoma City Thunder: Memphis acquired draft rights to Ebuka Okorie (No. 17 pick) and two second-round picks; Oklahoma City acquired draft rights to Bennett Stirtz (No. 16 pick))	Iowa (Sr.)
2	31	Bruce Thornton	PG	United States	New York Knicks (from Washington via Oklahoma City and Houston, (Note: December 2, 2020: Washington Wizards to Houston Rockets: Washington acquired Russell Westbrook; Houston acquired John Wall, 2026 and 2027 WAS second-round picks; July 30, 2021: Houston Rockets to Oklahoma City Thunder: Houston acquired draft rights to Alperen Şengün; Oklahoma City acquired 2026 and 2027 WAS second-round picks; June 24, 2022: Oklahoma City Thunder to New York Knicks: Oklahoma City acquired draft rights to Ousmane Dieng; New York acquired 2023 DEN and DET protected first-round picks, 2026 and 2027 WAS second-round picks) traded to Houston) (Note: June 24, 2026: New York Knicks to Houston Rockets (four-team trade with Detroit and L.A. Clippers): Houston acquired the draft rights to Bruce Thornton (No. 31 pick) and cash considerations; New York acquired the draft rights to Jack Kayil (No. 39 pick) and Mojave King, 2029 SAC second-round pick, and cash considerations; Detroit acquired the draft rights to Ugonna Onyenso (No. 53 pick); L.A. Clippers acquired the draft rights to Nick Martinelli (No. 55 pick))	Ohio State (Sr.)
2	38	Braden Smith	PG	United States	Chicago Bulls (from New Orleans via Boston, Detroit, and Portland, (Note: November 27, 2020: New Orleans Pelicans to Portland Trail Blazers: New Orleans acquired CJ McCollum, Larry Nance Jr., and Tony Snell; Portland acquired Nickeil Alexander-Walker, Josh Hart, Didi Louzada, Tomáš Satoranský, 2022 protected first-round pick, 2026 and 2027 second-round picks; July 6, 2022: Portland Trail Blazers to Detroit Pistons: Portland acquired Jerami Grant and draft rights to Ismaël Kamagate; Detroit acquired draft rights to Gabriele Procida, 2025 MIL protected first-round pick, 2025 DET second-round pick, and 2026 second-round pick; June 28, 2023: Detroit Pistons to Boston Celtics: Detroit acquired draft rights to Marcus Sasser; Boston acquired draft rights to James Nnaji, 2025 and 2026 second-round picks; February 5, 2026: Boston Celtics to Chicago Bulls: Boston acquired Nikola Vučević and 2027 DEN second-round pick; Chicago acquired draft rights to Anfernee Simons and 2026 second-round pick) traded to Indiana) (Note: June 24, 2026: Chicago Bulls to Indiana Pacers: Indiana acquired draft rights to Braden Smith (No. 38 pick); Chicago acquired Kam Jones, two future second-round pick swaps, and cash considerations)	Purdue (Sr.)
2	43	Tyler Bilodeau	PF	United States	Brooklyn Nets (from LA Clippers via Houston) (Note: February 9, 2023: Los Angeles Clippers to Houston Rockets (three-team trade with Memphis): Houston acquired John Wall, Danny Green, and LAC second-round pick swap; L.A. Clippers acquired Eric Gordon and three second-round picks; Memphis acquired Luke Kennard; July 6, 2025: Houston Rockets to Brooklyn Nets (seven-team trade with Phoenix, Atlanta, Golden State, Minnesota, L.A. Lakers): Brooklyn acquired 2026 LAC second-round pick and 2030 BOS second-round pick; Houston acquired Kevin Durant and Clint Capela; Phoenix acquired Jalen Green, Dillon Brooks, Daeqwon Plowden, Khaman Maluach, Rasheer Fleming, Koby Brea, 2026 PHI second-round pick, and 2032 second-round pick; Atlanta acquired David Roddy and 2031 HOU second-round pick swap; Golden State acquired Alex Toohey and Jahmai Mashack; Minnesota acquired Rocco Zikarsky, 2026 and 2032 second-round picks; L.A. Lakers acquired Adou Thiero)	UCLA (Sr.)
2	55	Nick Martinelli	SF	United States	New York Knicks (traded to L.A. Clippers)	Northwestern (Sr.)
2	59	Trey Kaufman-Renn	PF	United States	Minnesota Timberwolves (from San Antonio via Indiana) (Note: July 6, 2019: Miami Heat to Indiana Pacers (three-team trade with Phoenix): Indiana acquired TJ Warren, 2022, 2025, and 2026 MIA second-round picks; Miami acquired 2019 PHX second-round pick; Phoenix acquired cash considerations; August 8, 2021: Indiana Pacers to San Antonio Spurs: San Antonio acquired Doug McDermott, 2023 second-round pick, and 2026 second-round pick swap; Indiana acquired 2023 second-round pick; June 23, 2022: Indiana Pacers to Minnesota Timberwolves: Minnesota acquired 2026 SAS second-round pick; Indiana acquired Kendall Brown)	Purdue (Sr.)

=== Pre-draft trades ===
Prior to the draft, the following trades were made and resulted in exchanges of draft picks between teams.

=== Post-draft trades ===
Post-draft trades are made after the draft begins. These trades are usually not confirmed until the next day or after free agency officially begins.
