= Lendeborg =

Lendeborg is a surname. Notable people with the surname include:

- Jorge Lendeborg Jr. (born 1996), American actor
- Yaxel Lendeborg (born 2002), American-Dominican basketball player
