= 2025–26 Iowa Hawkeyes men's basketball team =

American college basketball season

2025–26 Iowa Hawkeyes men's basketball

Acrisure Classic champions

NCAA tournament, Elite Eight
- Conference: Big Ten Conference

Ranking
- Coaches: No. 19
- AP: No. 15
- Record: 24–13 (10–10 Big Ten)
- Head coach: Ben McCollum (1st season)
- Assistant coaches: Bryston Williams (1st season); Luke Barnwell (1st season); Josh Sash (1st season); Connor Wheeler (1st season)
- Home arena: Carver–Hawkeye Arena

2025–26 Big Ten Conference men's basketball standings
	Conf.				Overall
Team	W		L	PCT	W		L	PCT
No. 1 Michigan	19	–	1	.950	37	–	3	.925
No. 14 Nebraska	15	–	5	.750	28	–	7	.800
No. 5 Illinois	15	–	5	.750	28	–	9	.757
No. 11 Michigan State	15	–	5	.750	27	–	8	.771
No. 25 Wisconsin	14	–	6	.700	24	–	11	.686
No. 6 Purdue †	13	–	7	.650	30	–	9	.769
UCLA	13	–	7	.650	24	–	12	.667
Ohio State	12	–	8	.600	21	–	13	.618
No. 15 Iowa	10	–	10	.500	24	–	13	.649
Indiana	9	–	11	.450	18	–	14	.563
Minnesota	8	–	12	.400	15	–	18	.455
USC	7	–	13	.350	18	–	14	.563
Washington	7	–	13	.350	16	–	17	.485
Rutgers	6	–	14	.300	14	–	20	.412
Northwestern	5	–	15	.250	15	–	19	.441
Oregon	5	–	15	.250	12	–	20	.375
Maryland	4	–	16	.200	12	–	21	.364
Penn State	3	–	17	.150	12	–	20	.375
† 2026 Big Ten tournament winner Rankings from AP poll

The 2025–26 Iowa Hawkeyes men's basketball team represented the University of Iowa during the 2025–26 NCAA Division I men's basketball season. The Hawkeyes, led by first-year head coach Ben McCollum, played their home games at Carver–Hawkeye Arena in Iowa City, Iowa as a member of the Big Ten Conference.

Iowa opened the season with seven straight wins, including winning the Acrisure Classic. The team was ranked in the AP poll for three weeks before finishing the regular season with a 10–10 record in Big Ten play. The Hawkeyes played as the No. 9 seed in the Big Ten tournament. They defeated No. 17 seed Maryland in the second round before falling to No. 8 seed Ohio State, 72–69, in the third round.

The Hawkeyes received an at-large bid to the NCAA tournament as the No. 9 seed in the South region. Iowa defeated No. 8 seed Clemson 67–61 in the first round. In the second round, Iowa faced No. 1 seed and defending National champion Florida. With 4.5 seconds left, junior Alvaro Folgueiras made a game-winning 3-pointer to give the Hawkeyes the win, 73–72. The win sent Iowa to the Sweet Sixteen for the first time since 1999. It was also Iowa's first victory over a No. 1 seed in the NCAA Tournament since 1980. In the regional semifinal, the Hawkeyes faced a familiar opponent in No. 4 seed Nebraska. Despite trailing for nearly the first 38 minutes of the game, Iowa took the lead with 2:11 remaining on a 3-pointer from Bennett Stirtz and never trailed again, en route to a 77–71 victory. The win moved the Hawkeyes into the Elite Eight for the first time since 1987. In the South region final, Iowa faced another Big Ten opponent in No. 3 seed Illinois. The Hawkeyes jumped to an early double-digit lead and led by four at halftime. After numerous second-half lead changes, the Illini pulled away late and prevailed 71–59, ending Iowa's season with a 24–13 record.

== Previous season ==
The Hawkeyes finished the 2024–25 season 17–16, 7–13 in Big Ten play to finish in a five-way tie for twelfth place. As the No. 15 seed in the Big Ten tournament, they beat Ohio State in the first round, before losing to Illinois in the quarterfinals. The loss would be the final game of the season and the final game for Fran McCaffery as head coach at Iowa, as the Hawkeyes opted out of postseason play following the firing of McCaffery.

On March 14, 2025, the school fired head coach Fran McCaffery. On March 24, the school hired Drake head coach Ben McCollum to be their next head coach.

== Offseason ==
=== Departures ===
Iowa departures
Name	Number	Pos.	Height	Weight	Year	Hometown	Reason for departure
Even Brauns	0	F	6'9"	245	GS Senior	Iowa City, IA	Graduated
Brock Harding	2	G	6'0"	162	Sophomore	Moline, IL	Transferred to TCU
Drew Thelwell	3	G	6'3"	195	GS Senior	Orlando, FL	Graduated
Josh Dix	4	G	6'5"	200	Junior	Council Bluffs, IA	Transferred to Creighton
Trey Buchanan	5	G	6'1"	180	Freshman	Westfield, IN	Walk-on; transferred to South Dakota State
Seydou Traore	7	F	6'7"	215	Sophomore	New York City, NY	Transferred to Utah
Ladji Dembele	13	F	6'8"	250	Sophomore	Newark, NJ	Transferred to UNLV
Carter Kingsbury	14	G	6'4"	225	RS Junior	Ponca, NE	Walk-on; transferred to The Citadel
Payton Sandfort	20	F	6'7"	215	Senior	Waukee, IA	Graduated
Pryce Sandfort	24	F	6'6"	205	Sophomore	Waukee, IA	Transferred to Nebraska
Luc Laketa	25	G	6'5"	185	Senior	Concord, MI	Walk-on; left the team
Owen Freeman	32	F	6'10"	230	Sophomore	Moline, IL	Transferred to Creighton
Chris Tadjo	34	F	6'8"	220	Freshman	Montreal, Quebec	Transferred to Santa Clara
Riley Mulvey	44	F	6'10"	230	RS Junior	Rotterdam, NY	Transferred to Siena
Isaiah Johnson-Arigu		F	6'7"	220	Freshman	Minneapolis, MN	Transferred to St. Thomas (MN)

=== Incoming transfers ===
Iowa incoming transfers
Name	Number	Pos.	Height	Weight	Year	Hometown	Previous school
Cam Manyawu	3	F	6'9"	250	Junior	Kansas City, MO	Drake
Tavion Banks	6	G/F	6'7"	215	Senior	Kansas City, MO	Drake
Alvaro Folgueiras	7	F	6'10"	230	Junior	Málaga, Spain	Robert Morris
Kael Combs	11	G	6'4"	205	Junior	Nixa, MO	Drake
Bennett Stirtz	14	G	6'4"	190	Senior	Liberty, MO	Drake
Brendan Hausen	15	G	6'4"	220	Senior	Amarillo, TX	Kansas State
Isaia Howard	23	G	6'5"	215	Sophomore	Plattsburg, MO	Drake
Joey Matteoni	44	F	6'9"	220	RS Freshman	Overland Park, KS	Drake

=== Recruiting classes ===
==== 2025 recruiting class ====
College recruiting information
Name	Hometown	School	Height	Weight	Commit date
Trevin Jirak; C	West Des Moines, Iowa	Valley High School	6 ft 11 in (2.11 m)	260 lb (120 kg)	Apr 11, 2025
Trevin Jirak; C	Recruit ratings: No ratings found				
Tate Sage; SF	Weatherford, Oklahoma	Weatherford High School	6 ft 7 in (2.01 m)	195 lb (88 kg)	Apr 30, 2025
Tate Sage; SF	Recruit ratings: No ratings found				
Overall recruit ranking: Rivals: NR 247Sports: 39 ESPN: —
Note: In many cases, Scout, Rivals, 247Sports, On3, and ESPN may conflict in their listings of height and weight.; In these cases, the average was taken. ESPN grades are on a 100-point scale.; Sources: "Iowa 2025 Basketball Commitments". Rivals.; "2025 Iowa Hawkeyes Recruiting Class". ESPN.; "2025 Team Ranking". Rivals.

==== 2026 recruiting class ====
There are no current recruits for 2026.

== Roster ==
2025–26 Iowa Hawkeyes men's basketball team
Players
Coaches

Pos.	#	Name	Height	Weight	Year	Previous school	Hometown
F	3	Cam Manyawu	6 ft 9 in (2.06 m)	250 lb (113 kg)	Jr	Drake	Kansas City, MO
G	5	Peyton McCollum (W)	6 ft 2 in (1.88 m)	180 lb (82 kg)	Fr	Waukee Northwest HS	Maryville, MO
G/F	6	Tavion Banks	6 ft 7 in (2.01 m)	215 lb (98 kg)	Sr	Drake	Kansas City, MO
F	7	Alvaro Folgueiras	6 ft 10 in (2.08 m)	230 lb (104 kg)	Jr	Robert Morris	Málaga, Spain
F	8	Cooper Koch	6 ft 8 in (2.03 m)	220 lb (100 kg)	RS Fr	Metamora Township HS	Peoria, IL
G	10	Jacob Koch (W)	6 ft 2 in (1.88 m)	185 lb (84 kg)	So	Iowa City West HS	Iowa City, IA
G	11	Kael Combs	6 ft 4 in (1.93 m)	205 lb (93 kg)	Jr	Drake	Nixa, MO
G	14	Bennett Stirtz	6 ft 4 in (1.93 m)	190 lb (86 kg)	Sr	Drake	Liberty, MO
G	15	Brendan Hausen	6 ft 4 in (1.93 m)	220 lb (100 kg)	Sr	Kansas State	Amarillo, TX
F	20	Trey Thompson (W)	6 ft 8 in (2.03 m)	220 lb (100 kg)	Fr	Greeneville HS	Greeneville, TN
G	23	Isaia Howard	6 ft 5 in (1.96 m)	215 lb (98 kg)	So	Drake	Plattsburg, MO
G/F	24	Tate Sage	6 ft 7 in (2.01 m)	210 lb (95 kg)	Fr	Weatherford HS	Weatherford, OK
C	27	Trevin Jirak	6 ft 11 in (2.11 m)	250 lb (113 kg)	Fr	Valley HS	West Des Moines, IA
F	44	Joey Matteoni	6 ft 9 in (2.06 m)	220 lb (100 kg)	RS Fr	Drake	Overland Park, KS

Head coach

- Ben McCollum (Northwest Missouri State)

Assistant coach(es)

- Bryston Williams (Northwest Missouri State)
- Luke Barnwell (Newman)
- Josh Sash (William Penn)
- Connor Wheeler (SIU Edwardsville)

Legend

- (C) Team captain
- (S) Suspended
- (I) Ineligible
- (W) Walk-on
- Injured
- Current redshirt

Roster

== Schedule and results ==
Date time, TV	Rank^{#}	Opponent^{#}	Result	Record	High points	High rebounds	High assists	Site (attendance) city, state
Regular season
November 4, 2025*; 7:30 p.m., BTN		Robert Morris	W 101–69	1–0	19 – Stirtz	5 – Tied	6 – Stirtz	Carver–Hawkeye Arena (9,232); Iowa City, IA
November 7, 2025*; 6:00 p.m., B1G+		Western Illinois	W 77–58	2–0	24 – Stirtz	5 – Folgueiras	7 – Stirtz	Carver–Hawkeye Arena (10,978); Iowa City, IA
November 14, 2025*; 7:00 p.m., FS1		Xavier	W 81–62	3–0	21 – Stirtz	9 – Manyawu	4 – Combs	Carver–Hawkeye Arena (11,678); Iowa City, IA
November 18, 2025*; 7:30 p.m., BTN		Southeast Missouri State	W 99–70	4–0	16 – Folgueiras	5 – Tied	9 – Stirtz	Carver–Hawkeye Arena (9,302); Iowa City, IA
November 20, 2025*; 6:00 p.m., B1G+		Chicago State; Acrisure Series on-campus game	W 93–54	5–0	16 – Banks	10 – Banks	6 – Stirtz	Carver–Hawkeye Arena (9,265); Iowa City, IA
November 25, 2025*; 8:30 p.m., CBSSN		vs. Ole Miss; Acrisure Classic semifinal	W 74–69	6–0	29 – Stirtz	10 – C. Koch	2 – Tied	Acrisure Arena; Palm Desert, CA
November 26, 2025*; 8:30 p.m., CBSSN		vs. Grand Canyon; Acrisure Classic championship game	W 59–46	7–0	19 – Howard	6 – Tied	5 – Stirtz	Acrisure Arena; Palm Desert, CA
December 2, 2025; 6:00 p.m., Peacock		at No. 7 Michigan State	L 52–71	7–1 (0–1)	14 – Stirtz	6 – Manyawu	4 – Stirtz	Breslin Student Events Center (14,797); East Lansing, MI
December 6, 2025; 3:00 p.m., FS1		Maryland	W 83–64	8–1 (1–1)	25 – Stirtz	7 – Tied	3 – Tied	Carver–Hawkeye Arena (10,956); Iowa City, IA
December 11, 2025*; 7:00 p.m., FS1		at No. 4 Iowa State; Iowa Corn Cy-Hawk Series	L 62–66	8–2	14 – Banks	6 – Manyawu	4 – Stirtz	Hilton Coliseum (14,267); Ames, IA
December 14, 2025*; 2:00 p.m., BTN		Western Michigan	W 91–51	9–2	13 – Tied	6 – Tied	6 – Stirtz	Carver–Hawkeye Arena (10,341); Iowa City, IA
December 20, 2025*; 5:00 p.m., BTN		vs. Bucknell	W 94–39	10–2	17 – Folgueiras	9 – Banks	6 – Stirtz	Casey's Center (8,177); Des Moines, IA
December 29, 2025*; 4:00 p.m., BTN	No. 25	UMass Lowell	W 90–62	11–2	22 – Stirtz	9 – Manyawu	8 – Stirtz	Carver–Hawkeye Arena (11,324); Iowa City, IA
January 3, 2026; 5:00 p.m., Peacock	No. 25	UCLA	W 74–61	12–2 (2–1)	27 – Stirtz	6 – Manyawu	5 – Stirtz	Carver–Hawkeye Arena (12,657); Iowa City, IA
January 6, 2026; 7:00 p.m., BTN	No. 19	at Minnesota	L 67–70	12–3 (2–2)	21 – Stirtz	8 – Manyawu	3 – Koch	Williams Arena (8,976); Minneapolis, MN
January 11, 2026; 11:00 a.m., FOX	No. 19	No. 16 Illinois; Rivalry	L 69–75	12–4 (2–3)	16 – Banks	8 – Folgueiras	6 – Stirtz	Carver–Hawkeye Arena (13,559); Iowa City, IA
January 14, 2026; 5:30 p.m., BTN		at No. 5 Purdue	L 72–79	12–5 (2–4)	19 – Stirtz	5 – Combs	4 – Stirtz	Mackey Arena (14,876); West Lafayette, IN
January 17, 2026; 1:00 p.m., FOX		at Indiana	W 74–57	13–5 (3–4)	27 – Stirtz	8 – Banks	5 – Stirtz	Simon Skjodt Assembly Hall (17,222); Bloomington, IN
January 20, 2026; 7:30 p.m., BTN		Rutgers	W 68–62	14–5 (4–4)	20 – Stirtz	8 – Howard	5 – Stirtz	Carver–Hawkeye Arena (9,778); Iowa City, IA
January 28, 2026; 6:00 p.m., BTN		USC	W 73–72	15–5 (5–4)	20 – Tied	7 – Banks	4 – Combs	Carver–Hawkeye Arena (10,512); Iowa City, IA
February 1, 2026; 7:00 p.m., FS1		at Oregon	W 84–66	16–5 (6–4)	32 – Stirtz	8 – Folgueiras	7 – Stirtz	Matthew Knight Arena (5,807); Eugene, OR
February 4, 2026; 10:00 p.m., BTN		at Washington	W 84–74	17–5 (7–4)	22 – Stirtz	5 – Manyawu	5 – Stirtz	Alaska Airlines Arena (6,904); Seattle, WA
February 8, 2026; 2:00 p.m., FS1		Northwestern	W 76–70	18–5 (8–4)	36 – Stirtz	7 – Banks	3 – Folgueiras	Carver–Hawkeye Arena (11,474); Iowa City, IA
February 11, 2026; 5:00 p.m., FS1		at Maryland	L 70–77	18–6 (8–5)	32 – Stirtz	8 – Banks	6 – Stirtz	Xfinity Center (12,055); College Park, MD
February 14, 2026; 4:00 p.m., FOX		No. 13 Purdue	L 57–78	18–7 (8–6)	19 – Stirtz	8 – Manyawu	4 – Howard	Carver–Hawkeye Arena (14,998); Iowa City, IA
February 17, 2026; 8:00 p.m., BTN		No. 9 Nebraska; Rivalry	W 57–52	19–7 (9–6)	25 – Stirtz	10 – Banks	2 – Stirtz	Carver–Hawkeye Arena (11,483); Iowa City, IA
February 22, 2026; 3:00 p.m., FS1		at No. 24 Wisconsin	L 71–84	19–8 (9–7)	23 – Stirtz	7 – Tied	4 – Folgueiras	Kohl Center (16,838); Madison, WI
February 25, 2026; 8:00 p.m., BTN		Ohio State	W 74–57	20–8 (10–7)	22 – Stirtz	7 – Manyawu	5 – Folgueiras	Carver–Hawkeye Arena (10,368); Iowa City, IA
February 28, 2026; 11:00 a.m., BTN		at Penn State	L 69–71	20–9 (10–8)	18 – Koch	7 – Manyawu	5 – Stirtz	Bryce Jordan Center (6,922); State College, PA
March 5, 2026; 7:00 p.m., Peacock		No. 3 Michigan	L 68–71	20–10 (10–9)	21 – Stirtz	8 – Manyawu	4 – Stirtz	Carver–Hawkeye Arena (13,854); Iowa City, IA
March 8, 2026; 4:00 p.m., FOX		at No. 9 Nebraska; Rivalry	L 75–84 ^{OT}	20–11 (10–10)	18 – Tied	7 – Banks	6 – Folgueiras	Pinnacle Bank Arena (15,340); Lincoln, NE
Big Ten Tournament
March 11, 2026; 11:00 a.m., Peacock/NBCSN	(9)	vs. (17) Maryland; Second round	W 75–64	21–11	19 – Koch	6 – Stirtz	8 – Stirtz	United Center (15,661); Chicago, IL
March 12, 2026; 11:00 a.m., BTN	(9)	vs. (8) Ohio State; Third round	L 69–72	21–12	17 – Stirtz	7 – Folgueiras	4 – Stirtz	United Center (16,157); Chicago, IL
NCAA Tournament
March 20, 2026; 5:50 p.m., TNT	(9 S)	vs. (8 S) Clemson; First round	W 67–61	22–12	16 – Stirtz	10 – Manyawu	2 – Stirtz	Benchmark International Arena (20,112); Tampa, FL
March 22, 2026; 6:10 p.m., TBS	(9 S)	vs. (1 S) No. 4 Florida; Second round	W 73–72	23–12	20 – Banks	6 – Banks	6 – Combs	Benchmark International Arena (14,717); Tampa, FL
March 26, 2026; 6:30 pm, TBS/truTV	(9 S)	vs. (4 S) No. 15 Nebraska; Sweet Sixteen / Rivalry	W 77–71	24–12	20 – Stirtz	8 – Sage	5 – Combs	Toyota Center (17,307); Houston, TX
March 28, 2026; 5:09 p.m., TBS/truTV	(9 S)	vs. (3 S) No. 13 Illinois; Elite Eight / Rivalry	L 59–71	24–13	24 – Stirtz	5 – Manyawu	3 – Tied	Toyota Center (17,010); Houston, TX
*Non-conference game. ^{#}Rankings from AP Poll. (#) Tournament seedings in parentheses. S=South. All times are in Central Time.

== Rankings ==
Ranking movements Legend: ██ Increase in ranking ██ Decrease in ranking — = Not ranked RV = Received votes т = Tied with team above or below
	Week																				
Poll	Pre	1	2	3	4	5	6	7	8	9	10	11	12	13	14	15	16	17	18	19	Final
AP	RV	RV	RV	RV	RV	RV	RV	25	25*	19	RV	RV	RV	RV	RV	—	RV	—	—	—	15
Coaches	RV	RV	RV	RV	25	23	25	23	23	19	23	RV	25т	RV	25	RV	RV	—	—	—	19
