= Braden Frager =

American basketball player (born 2006)

No. 5 – Nebraska Cornhuskers
- Position: Small forward
- League: Big Ten Conference

Personal information
- Born: November 10, 2006 (age 20)
- Listed height: 6 ft 7 in (2.01 m)
- Listed weight: 221 lb (100 kg)

Career information
- High school: Lincoln Southwest (Lincoln, Nebraska)
- College: Nebraska (2024–present)

Career highlights
- Big Ten Sixth Man of the Year (2026); Big Ten All-Freshman Team (2026)

Braden Frager is a college basketball player for the Nebraska Cornhuskers of the Big Ten Conference.

== Early life and high school ==
Frager attended Lincoln Southwest High School in Lincoln, Nebraska, and committed to play college basketball for the Nebraska Cornhuskers over Creighton.

== College career ==
As a freshman during the 2024-25 season, Frager took a redshirt. On November 3, 2025, he made his collegiate debut, where he scored 22 points in a victory versus West Georgia. On November 20, Frager totaled 20 points and eight rebounds in a win against New Mexico. On November 24, he earned Big Ten Freshman of the Week honors for the first time in his career. On December 26, Frager was named the Big Ten Freshman of the Week for the second time. On January 5, 2026, he scored a team-high 15 points in a win versus Ohio State.
