= Lincoln Southwest High School =

Public high school in Lincoln, Nebraska, United States of America

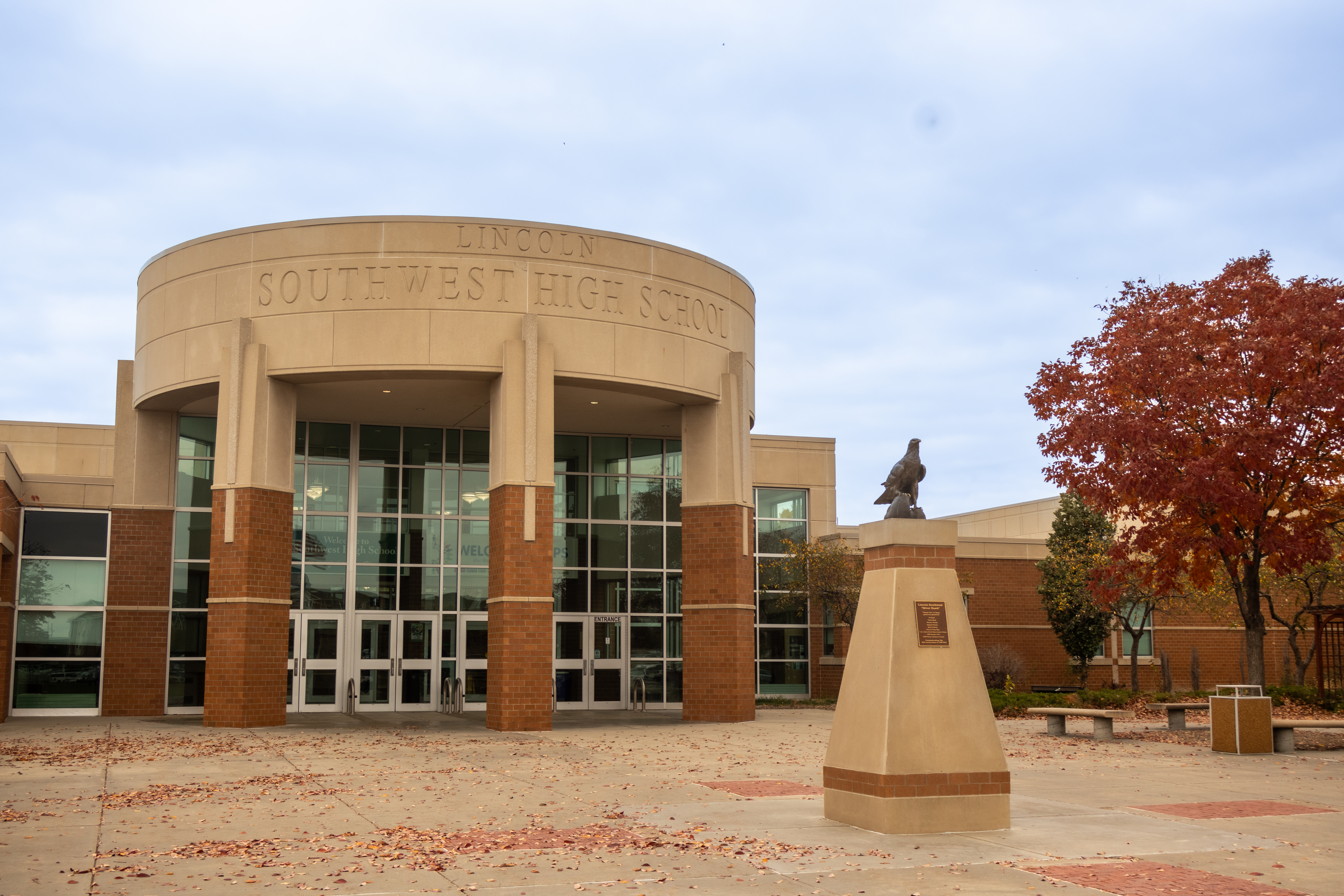
- Lincoln Southwest High School

Location
- 7001 South 14th Street; Lincoln, Nebraska 68512; United States; 40°44′23″N 96°42′15″W

Information
- Type: Public High School
- Motto: "S.O.A.R."
- Established: c. August 2002
- Sister school: Senshu University Matsudo High School
- School district: Lincoln Public Schools
- Principal: John Matzen
- Faculty: 200+
- Teaching staff: 106.80 (FTE)
- Grades: 9-12
- Enrollment: 2,110 (2024-2025)
- Student to teacher ratio: 19.76
- Colors: Forest Green and Silver
- Athletics conference: Heartland Athletic Conference
- Mascot: Sylvester Silver Hawk
- Nickname: Silver Hawks
- Rival: Lincoln Southeast High School
- Newspaper: The Hawk
- Website: Lincoln Southwest High School

Lincoln Southwest High School is a Lincoln Public high school located 74 acres adjacent to Wilderness Park in Lincoln, Nebraska. The school opened in August 2002 and was designed to hold around 1,500 students. The student population as of the 2024-25 school year is 2,110 students in grades 9-12.

== Academics ==
Southwest offers dual enrollment education through three local tertiary education institutions. The University of Nebraska-Lincoln offers dual enrollment to students on the university's campus, Nebraska Wesleyan University (NWU) offers dual enrollment at Southwest's campus through the NWU Honors Academy, and Southeast Community College (SCC) offers dual enrollment on both Southwest's campus and the Lincoln Public School's Career Academy campus located on the SCC campus.

== Extracurricular Activities ==
=== NSAA Sponsored Programs ===
==== Forensics ====
In 2006, Southwest was awarded the National Speech and Debate Association's National School of Excellence Award for their debate program. In 2013, Southwest's speech program also received the National School of Excellence Award.

==== Swim and Dive ====
The Southwest Girls swim and dive team has won four state championships, including a three-peat from 2016 to 2018. The Silver Hawk first swimming and diving championship was in 2014, which was also the first swim and dive championship for a Lincoln school since 1999. In 2017 the girls' swimming and diving team took first at state and set five new individual state records.

==== Science Olympiad ====
The Southwest Science Olympiad team has, since 2008, won ten out of eleven state championships, each annually qualifying them for the national tournament.

==== Football ====
After going win-less in their first season, the Southwest football team made the state playoffs during fourteen of the following sixteen seasons.

==== Golf ====
The Southwest golf teams have won five combined team state title for the school, including a four-year run where the Boys team won three championships. In 2018, the Girls golf team won state championship in the first round of competition, finishing with a seventeen stroke lead.

==== Music ====
The Southwest music program consists of three primary divisions; band, orchestra, and choir. Nearly a quarter of Southwest's student body is involved in the Music Department.

Southwest also has three a cappella ensembles: Hawktet, their varsity octet group, Silver Lining, their women's group, and the Quicksilvers, their men's barbershop quartet.

==== Soccer ====
The Southwest soccer team have won four overall state titles. The boys and girls both have two titles each. Overall, they have appeared in six state championship matches.

==== Softball ====
The Southwest softball team have won three state titles, including back-to-back championships in 2008 and 2009. In 2018, the Silver Hawks was first team in Nebraska to lose their first game in the double-elimination tournament to come back and win a state title. In 2021, the Silver Hawks won another state title, defeating the Spartans of Lincoln East in a dominant, 16-7. In 2025, the Silver Hawks yet again, won another state title, defeating the Millard North Mustangs, 4-2. Overall, they have won five state titles.

==== Tennis ====
The Southwest tennis teams have won a combined three state championships. During the 2017 Boys State Finals, Southwest swept the entire championship bracket, winning all singles and doubles brackets.

==== Track and Field ====
The Southwest Girls track and field teams have won three state titles. The Boys' team placed second in the NSAA state meet in 2017, finishing half a point behind Lincoln High School.

==== Theatre ====
Silver Hawk Theatre is a member of the International Thespian Society and has performed at the International Thespian Festival four times, most recently debuting the MTI licensing version of Kinky Boots at the 2022 festival in Indiana.

== Notable alumni ==
- Braden Frager, college men's basketball player for the Nebraska Cornhuskers
- Ashley Graham, supermodel and body activist
- Kianna Perez, college women's soccer player for the Nebraska Cornhuskers
- Brandon Reilly, NFL football player for the Pittsburgh Steelers
- Wyn Wiley, known professionally as Pattie Gonia, a drag queen, environmental and LGBTQ+ activist and community organizer
- Kennadi Williams, college women's basketball player for the Nebraska Cornhuskers
