= John Blackwell (basketball) =

American basketball player (born 2004)

No. 13 – Duke Blue Devils
- Position: Shooting guard / point guard
- Conference: Atlantic Coast Conference

Personal information
- Born: December 25, 2004 (age 21)
- Listed height: 6 ft 5 in (1.96 m)
- Listed weight: 205 lb (93 kg)

Career information
- High school: Brother Rice (Bloomfield Township, Michigan)
- College: Wisconsin (2023–2026); Duke (2026–present)

Career highlights
- Third-team All-Big Ten (2026); Big Ten All-Freshman Team (2024)

John Blackwell (born December 25, 2004) is an American college basketball player for the Duke Blue Devils of the Atlantic Coast Conference (ACC). He previously played for the Wisconsin Badgers.

== Early life and high school career ==
Blackwell attended Brother Rice High School in Bloomfield Hills, Michigan, where he played on the basketball team. During his junior season, Blackwell averaged 13 points, 5 rebounds and 4 assists per game while shooting 49% from three-point range, the highest percent among high school player in Michigan that season.

=== Recruiting ===
Blackwell received nine NCAA Division I offers. He chose Wisconsin over offers from VCU, Central Michigan, Eastern Michigan, Oakland, Cleveland State, Rhode Island, Toledo and Northern Illinois.

College recruiting
Name	Hometown	School	Height	Weight	Commit date
John Blackwell; CG	Bloomfield Hills, MI	Brother Rice High School (MI)	6 ft 3 in (1.91 m)	175 lb (79 kg)	Apr 15, 2022
John Blackwell; CG	Recruit ratings: Scout: Rivals: 247Sports: ESPN: (77)				
Overall recruit ranking:
Note: In many cases, Scout, Rivals, 247Sports, On3, and ESPN may conflict in their listings of height and weight.; In these cases, the average was taken. ESPN grades are on a 100-point scale.; Sources: "2023 Wisconsin Commitments". Rivals.; "Men's Basketball Recruiting". Scout.; "ESPN- Wisconsin Badgers Men's Basketball Recruiting". ESPN.; "Scout.com Team Recruiting Rankings". Scout.; "2023 Team Ranking". Rivals.

== College career ==
=== Wisconsin Badgers ===
As a freshman, Blackwell came into a guard heavy roster for the Badgers. Blackwell's ability to shoot, penetrate and guard on the perimeter gave him minutes early in the season. Blackwell was named Big Ten Freshman of the Week on November 27, 2023. Blackwell played in two games during the Fort Myers Tip-Off where he averaged 10 points and 6.5 rebounds. Blackwell was awarded another Big Ten Freshman of the Week on December 11, 2023. Badgers earned a victory over Michigan State and a road loss to number one ranked Arizona. Blackwell averaged 13.5 points, 5.5 rebounds, 1.5 assists on 50% shooting and 4–of–7 beyond the arc. Blackwell earned his third Big Ten Freshman of the Week on January 22, 2024. The Badgers split the week with a loss on the road at Penn State and a home victory over Indiana. Blackwell averaged 13 points and 3 rebounds for the week. Blackwell became the first Badger freshman to be named Big Ten Freshman of the Week three times since Ethan Happ in 2015–16. Following the completion of the regular season, Blackwell was named to the All-Freshman Team.

As a sophomore, Blackwell was inserted into the starting lineup following the transfer of Chucky Hepburn and AJ Storr. On January 3, 2025, Blackwell scored a career high 32 points in a record setting night during a 116-85 victory over the Iowa Hawkeyes. Blackwell went on to start every game for the Badgers and was the second leading scorer behind John Tonje, averaging 15.8 points per game. Blackwell was named All-Big Ten honorable mention following the conclusion of the regular season.

As a junior, Blackwell averaged 19.1 points, 5.1 rebounds and 2.3 assists per game, while shooting nearly 39% from 3-point range. He was named to the Third Team All-Big Ten. Following the season he entered the transfer portal as well as the NBA draft process.

=== Duke Blue Devils ===
On April 21, 2026, Blackwell transferred to Duke.

== Career statistics ==
Legend
GP	Games played	GS	Games started	MPG	Minutes per game
FG%	Field goal percentage	3P%	3-point field goal percentage	FT%	Free throw percentage
RPG	Rebounds per game	APG	Assists per game	SPG	Steals per game
BPG	Blocks per game	PPG	Points per game	**Bold**	Career high

=== College ===
Year	Team	GP	GS	MPG	FG%	3P%	FT%	RPG	APG	SPG	BPG	PPG
2023–24	Wisconsin	34	1	18.5	.446	**.455**	.821	3.2	0.6	0.4	**0.1**	8.0
2024–25	Wisconsin	**37**	**37**	31.2	**.451**	.322	.815	**5.1**	2.2	0.9	**0.1**	15.8
2025–26	Wisconsin	34	34	**33.8**	.430	.389	**.859**	**5.1**	**2.3**	**1.1**	**0.1**	**19.1**
Career		105	72	27.9	.441	.373	.835	4.5	1.7	0.8	0.1	14.3

== Personal life ==
Blackwell is a Christian. His father, Glynn, played college basketball at Illinois and was the team captain for the 1987–88 Fighting Illini.
