= Donovan Dent =

American basketball player (born 2003)

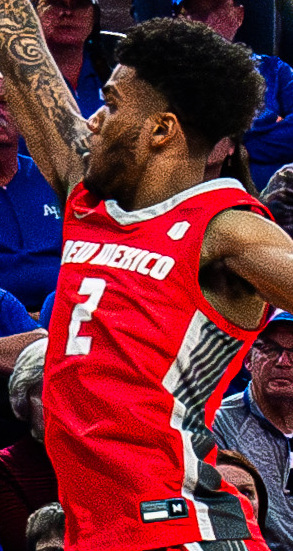
- Dent with the New Mexico Lobos in 2024

No. 3 – LSU Tigers
- Position: Point guard
- Conference: Southeastern Conference

Personal information
- Born: December 2, 2003 (age 22) Riverside, California, U.S.
- Listed height: 6 ft 2 in (1.88 m)
- Listed weight: 185 lb (84 kg)

Career information
- High school: Centennial (Corona, California)
- College: New Mexico (2022–2025); UCLA (2025–2026); LSU (2026–present)

Career highlights
- Honorable mention All-American – AP, USBWA (2025); Mountain West Player of the Year (2025); First-team All-Mountain West (2025); Second-team All-Mountain West (2024); California Mr. Basketball (2022)

Donovan Dent (born December 2, 2003) is an American college basketball player for the LSU Tigers of the Southeastern Conference (SEC). He previously played for the New Mexico Lobos and UCLA Bruins. He was named the Mountain West Conference Player of the Year with the Lobos in 2025.

== High school career ==
Dent was born in Riverside, California, and attended Centennial High School in Corona. As a senior, he averaged 16.2 points and 6.6 assists per game, leading Centennial to a 33–1 record and a state championship. As a result, he was named California Mr. Basketball and the John R. Wooden High School Player of the Year. A four-star recruit, he committed to play college basketball at the University of New Mexico.

== College career ==
=== New Mexico ===
After playing a role as a reserve during his freshman year, Dent had a breakout season as a sophomore. Against Colorado State, Dent hit the game-winning layup to defeat the Rams, 68–66. He finished his sophomore campaign averaging 14.1 points and 5.4 assists per game, while being named to the second-team All-Mountain West.

During his junior season in 2024–25, Dent emerged as the Mountain West Conference's leading scorer. Against VCU, he scored a career-high 40 points leading the Lobos to a 78–71 victory. After standout performances against Fresno State and UNLV, Dent was named the Mountain West Player of the Week for the third time of the season. He finished the season averaging 20.5 points and 6.4 assists per game and was named the Mountain West Player of the Year. He also received honorable mention from both the Associated Press and United States Basketball Writers Association for their All-America teams.

=== UCLA ===
After the season, Dent entered the transfer portal. On March 28, 2025, he announced his decision to transfer to the University of California, Los Angeles, to play for the Bruins. He struggled early in the 2025–26 season while dealing with a string of injuries and the pressure of returning home to the Los Angeles area amid high expectations. On January 20, 2026, Dent had 23 points and 13 assists in a 69–67 upset win over No. 4 Purdue. His play improved after a February 17 loss to Michigan State. On February 21 against Illinois, he took the inbound pass with 4.9 seconds remaining in the game and drove the length of the court to make the game-winning layup at the buzzer for a 95–94 overtime win over the No. 10 Illini. He finished the game with 14 points and 15 assists and no turnovers. In the following game against USC, he scored a season-high 30 points and added eight assists with no turnovers in an 81–62 win over their crosstown rivals. Dent received honorable mention for the All-Big Ten team.

In UCLA's opener in the Big Ten tournament, he had 12 points, 10 rebounds, and 12 assists for his first career triple-double in a 72–59 win over Rutgers. It was the first triple-double in the tournament's history. In the following game, he had 23 points, 12 assists, six rebounds, and four steals in an 88–84 quarterfinals win over No. 8–ranked and third-seeded Michigan State. He was limited to two points in 10 minutes in the semifinals against Purdue after suffering a mild calf strain. Already playing without their leading scorer, Tyler Bilodeau, who left the quarterfinals with a minor knee strain, the Bruins lost to the Boilermakers 73–66. Dent returned in the Bruins' opener in the 2026 NCAA tournament, when he had a career-high six steals along with 10 points, five assists and no turnovers to help No. 7–seed UCLA win 75–71 over No. 10–seed UCF. He finished the season averaging 13.3 points and 7.6 assists, which ranked third nationally, with only 1.8 turnovers per game.

Following his senior season at UCLA, Dent announced that he would retire from basketball and not pursue a professional career. According to Dent, he decided with his family and chose to retire on his own terms. He also stated how he wants to give back to the youth and become a trainer for aspiring basketball athletes back in Albuquerque.

=== LSU ===
In August 2026, Dent was granted a temporary restraining order against the NCAA and as a result granted a fifth season of eligibility after filing a lawsuit in the state of California. He committed to play his final season at Louisiana State University.

== Career statistics ==
Legend
GP	Games played	GS	Games started	MPG	Minutes per game
FG%	Field goal percentage	3P%	3-point field goal percentage	FT%	Free throw percentage
RPG	Rebounds per game	APG	Assists per game	SPG	Steals per game
BPG	Blocks per game	PPG	Points per game	**Bold**	Career high

=== College ===
Year	Team	GP	GS	MPG	FG%	3P%	FT%	RPG	APG	SPG	BPG	PPG
2022–23	New Mexico	34	2	18.5	.507	.211	.685	2.0	2.3	.9	.7	5.6
2023–24	New Mexico	35	35	31.3	.520	.375	.682	2.5	5.4	1.5	.7	14.1
2024–25	New Mexico	35	35	35.3	.490	.409	.784	2.3	6.4	1.4	.9	20.4
2025–26	UCLA	35	34	34.4	.408	.254	.656	2.9	7.6	1.7	.3	13.3

== See also ==
- 2025 NCAA Men's Basketball All-Americans
