= Tyler Bilodeau =

American basketball player (born 2004)

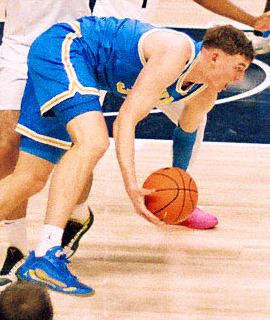
- Bilodeau with the UCLA Bruins in 2026

No. 34 – Brooklyn Nets
- Position: Power forward
- League: NBA

Personal information
- Born: April 17, 2004 (age 22) Billings, Montana, U.S.
- Listed height: 6 ft 8 in (2.03 m)
- Listed weight: 230 lb (104 kg)

Career information
- High school: Kamiakin (Kennewick, Washington)
- College: Oregon State (2022–2024); UCLA (2024–2026)
- NBA draft: 2026: 2nd round, 43rd overall pick
- Drafted by: Brooklyn Nets
- Playing career: 2026–present

Career history
- 2026–present: Brooklyn Nets
- 2026–present: →Long Island Nets

Career highlights
- 2× Third-team All-Big Ten (2025, 2026); Washington Mr. Basketball (2022)
- Stats at NBA.com
- Stats at Basketball Reference

Tyler Bilodeau (born April 17, 2004) is an American basketball player for the Brooklyn Nets of the National Basketball Association (NBA), on a two-way contract with the Long Island Nets of the NBA G League. He played college basketball for the Oregon State Beavers and UCLA Bruins. He earned third-team all-conference honors twice in the Big Ten with UCLA. He was selected by Brooklyn in the second round of the 2026 NBA draft.

== Early life ==
Bilodeau was born in Billings, Montana, to 1991 National Hockey League first-round draft pick Brent Bilodeau and Women's National Basketball Association player Cass Bauer-Bilodeau. Tyler Bilodeau played both hockey and basketball growing up, before settling on basketball. As a senior at Kamiakin High School in Kennewick, Washington, he averaged 22.7 points and 10.3 rebounds, while leading the team to a fourth-place finish in the Washington Class 4A state tournament. He was named Mid-Columbia Conference Player of the Year and honored as Washington Mr. Basketball.

Coming out of high school, Bilodeau was rated as a three-star recruit and committed to play collegiately for the Oregon State Beavers over other schools such as Boise State, Saint Louis and Washington State.

== College career ==
=== Oregon State ===
As a freshman at Oregon State University in 2022–23, Bilodeau made 13 starts and averaged 7.0 points and 3.9 rebounds per game. On December 28, 2023, he recorded 10 points and 14 rebounds against UCLA. In his sophomore year in 2023–24, Bilodeau changed his jersey number from 10 to 34 in honor of his mother, who wore the number in college and professionally. "My mom is who I look up to. She's the reason I play basketball", he said. He averaged 14.3 points and 5.7 rebounds per game that season, while shooting 34.5% on his three-pointers. His 53.3% field goal percentage ranked fourth in the Pac-12 Conference. After the season, he entered the NCAA transfer portal, becoming one of the best shooting big men available.

=== UCLA ===
Bilodeau transferred to play at the University of California, Los Angeles. He played the entire 2024–25 season for the Bruins out of position at center, where he was the starter in each game that he played. On November 8, 2024, Bilodeau tallied 23 points and a career-high 15 rebounds in a loss to New Mexico Lobos. On December 21, he tied his then-career-high with 26 points in a loss to North Carolina. The Bruins earned a No. 7 seed in the 2025 NCAA tournament, Bilodeau's first appearance in the tournament in his career. He finished the season as UCLA's leading scorer at 13.5 points per game, shooting a team-high 40.0 percent on 3-pointers, and ranked second on the Bruins in rebounding with 4.6 per game. He was named third-team All-Big Ten Conference by the conference coaches.

The following season, Bilodeau scored a career-high 34 points in a 97–65 win over UC Riverside. On January 20, 2026, he made the game-winning 3-pointer with eight seconds remaining in a 69–67 upset win over No. 4 Purdue. Averaging almost four points more than his previous career high, he was named third-team All-Big Ten by both coaches and the media. In the 2026 Big Ten tournament, Bilodeau was sidelined after suffering a mild right knee sprain late in the first half of the quarterfinals, which the Bruins won in an upset against No. 8 Michigan State. He was held out of the semifinals against Purdue, but was expected to be available for the NCAA tournament. However, UCLA head coach Mick Cronin held him out of their opener, a win by No. 7–seed UCLA over No. 10–seed UCF. Following his season at UCLA, Bilodeau was one of the 73 participants that were selected to participate in the NBA draft combine.

== Professional career ==
On June 24, 2026, Bilodeau was selected by the Brooklyn Nets in the second round of the 2026 NBA draft with the 43rd overall pick. He signed a two-way contract with Brooklyn and their G League team, the Long Island Nets.
