= Bruce Thornton (basketball) =

American basketball player (born 2003)

No. 2 – Houston Rockets
- Position: Point guard
- League: NBA

Personal information
- Born: September 14, 2003 (age 23) Fairburn, Georgia, U.S.
- Listed height: 6 ft 0 in (1.83 m)
- Listed weight: 229 lb (104 kg)

Career information
- High school: Milton (Milton, Georgia)
- College: Ohio State (2022–2026)
- NBA draft: 2026: 2nd round, 31st overall pick
- Drafted by: New York Knicks
- Playing career: 2026–present

Career history
- 2026–present: Houston Rockets
- 2026: →Rio Grande Valley Vipers

Career highlights
- 2× Second-team All-Big Ten (2025, 2026); Third-team All-Big Ten (2024); Mr. Georgia Basketball (2022)
- Stats at NBA.com
- Stats at Basketball Reference

Bruce Rashad Thornton Jr. (born September 14, 2003) is an American basketball player for the Houston Rockets of the National Basketball Association (NBA). He played college basketball for the Ohio State Buckeyes, where he finished his career as the program's all-time leading scorer.

== Early life ==
Thornton was raised in Alpharetta, Georgia and attended Milton High School, where he was a four–year starter on the basketball team. The team won the state championship in 2021, and Thornton was Mr. Georgia Basketball and the Gatorade Georgia Boys' Basketball Player of the Year in 2022.

=== Recruiting ===
Thornton was considered a consensus four-star recruit by ESPN, 247Sports and Rivals. On November 26, 2020, Thornton committed to play college basketball for Ohio State over offers from teams such as Alabama, Georgia, and Auburn.

College recruiting
Name	Hometown	School	Height	Weight	Commit date
Bruce Thornton; PG	Alpharetta, GA	Milton (GA)	6 ft 2 in (1.88 m)	195 lb (88 kg)	Nov 26, 2020
Bruce Thornton; PG	Recruit ratings: Rivals: 247Sports: ESPN: (86)				
Overall recruit ranking:
Note: In many cases, Scout, Rivals, 247Sports, On3, and ESPN may conflict in their listings of height and weight.; In these cases, the average was taken. ESPN grades are on a 100-point scale.; Sources: "2022 Team Ranking". Rivals.

== College career ==
As a freshman, Thornton started all 35 games for Ohio State during the 2022–23 season while averaging 10.6 points and 2.6 assists per game. He scored his most points of the season against Michigan with 22. On March 7, 2026, Thornton scored a three pointer during a game against Indiana to become Ohio State’s all time leading scorer.

== Professional career ==
On June 24, 2026, Thornton was selected by the New York Knicks with the 31st overall pick in the 2026 NBA draft then was immediately traded to the Houston Rockets for pick 39 (Jack Kayil) and the draft rights to Mojave King.

== College statistics ==
Legend
GP	Games played	GS	Games started	MPG	Minutes per game
FG%	Field goal percentage	3P%	3-point field goal percentage	FT%	Free throw percentage
RPG	Rebounds per game	APG	Assists per game	SPG	Steals per game
BPG	Blocks per game	PPG	Points per game	**Bold**	Career high

=== College ===
Year	Team	GP	GS	MPG	FG%	3P%	FT%	RPG	APG	SPG	BPG	PPG
2022–23	Ohio State	**35**	**35**	30.5	.456	.375	.729	2.7	2.6	.8	.1	10.6
2023–24	Ohio State	**35**	**35**	33.6	.427	.333	.850	3.7	**4.8**	**1.2**	.0	15.7
2024–25	Ohio State	32	32	36.2	.501	**.424**	**.853**	3.4	4.6	1.1	.1	17.7
2025–26	Ohio State	34	34	**36.5**	**.554**	.400	.829	**5.1**	3.9	1.1	**.2**	**19.9**
Career		136	136	34.1	.486	.381	.829	3.7	4.0	1.1	.1	15.9
