= Alvaro Folgueiras =

Spanish college basketball player (born 2005)

No. 7 – Louisville Cardinals
- Position: Power forward
- Conference: Atlantic Coast Conference

Personal information
- Born: April 1, 2005 (age 21) Málaga, Spain
- Listed height: 6 ft 10 in (2.08 m)
- Listed weight: 230 lb (104 kg)

Career information
- High school: DME Academy (Daytona Beach, Florida)
- College: Robert Morris (2023–2025); Iowa (2025–2026); Louisville (2026–present)

Career highlights
- Horizon League Player of the Year (2025); First-team All-Horizon League (2025)
Medals
Men's basketball
Representing Spain
FIBA U17 World Cup
Silver medal – second place	2022 Spain	Team

Álvaro Folgueiras Campos (born April 1, 2005) is a Spanish college basketball player for the Louisville Cardinals of the Atlantic Coast Conference (ACC). He previously played for the Robert Morris Colonials and Iowa Hawkeyes.

== Early life ==
Born in Málaga on April 1, 2005, Folgueiras began his basketball career playing for CB El Palo and the youth system of Unicaja Málaga in Spain before leaving for the United States to play at the DME Academy in Daytona Beach, Florida. After spending a season at the DME Academy, Folgueiras committed to play college basketball at Robert Morris University.

== College career ==
Folgueiras played mostly as a reserve as a freshman, before increasing his production the following year. On December 21, 2024, in a game against Saint Francis, he recorded a double-double, totaling 27 points and 16 rebounds, to go along with four steals, three blocks, and four assists. As a sophomore, he was named the Horizon League Player of the Year.

On April 20, 2025, Folgueiras announced his decision to transfer to the University of Iowa to play for the Iowa Hawkeyes. On March 22, 2026, he scored 14 points and had five rebounds off the bench, including a game-winning three-pointer with 4.5 seconds left, in Iowa's 73–72 NCAA tournament win over No. 1 seed and defending national champion Florida, sending the Hawkeyes to their first Sweet 16 since 1999.

On April 21, 2026, Folgueiras transferred to the University of Louisville.

== Style of play ==
Folgueiras is a stretch forward, excelling in both post play and three-point shooting. He is also an exceptional rebounder. During his time at Robert Morris, commentator Chris Shovlin began referring to him by the nickname El Pulpo Fol ("Fol the Octopus" in Spanish) after noting that his rebounding proficiency made it seem as though he had extra limbs. The nickname also doubled as an homage to El Pulpo Paul, the octopus who famously predicted matches during the 2010 FIFA World Cup, which was won by Folgueiras's native Spain.

== Career statistics ==
Legend
GP	Games played	GS	Games started	MPG	Minutes per game
FG%	Field goal percentage	3P%	3-point field goal percentage	FT%	Free throw percentage
RPG	Rebounds per game	APG	Assists per game	SPG	Steals per game
BPG	Blocks per game	PPG	Points per game	**Bold**	Career high

=== College ===
Year	Team	GP	GS	MPG	FG%	3P%	FT%	RPG	APG	SPG	BPG	PPG
2023–24	Robert Morris	32	6	17.8	.456	.286	.737	4.5	1.2	.4	.7	5.3
2024–25	Robert Morris	35	35	29.3	.548	.413	.784	9.1	3.2	1.4	1.2	14.1
2025–26	Iowa	37	1	20.7	.500	.333	.767	3.6	2.2	.9	.2	8.4
