= Yaxel Lendeborg =

American-Dominican basketball player (born 2002)

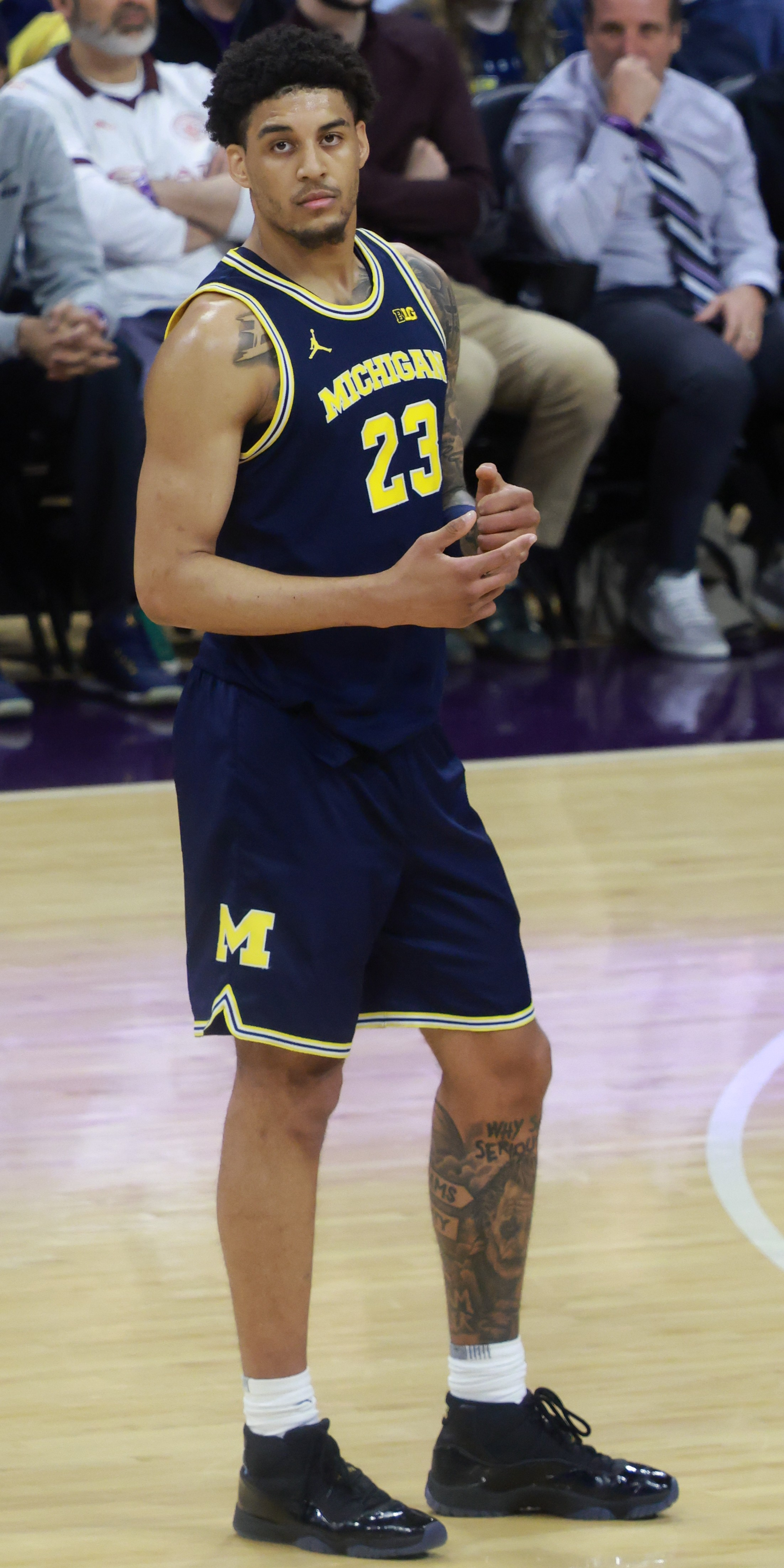
- Lendeborg with the 2025–26 Michigan Wolverines

No. 1 – Golden State Warriors
- Position: Small forward / power forward
- League: NBA

Personal information
- Born: September 30, 2002 (age 24) San Juan, Puerto Rico
- Listed height: 6 ft 9 in (2.06 m)
- Listed weight: 247 lb (112 kg)

Career information
- High school: Pennsauken (Pennsauken Township, New Jersey)
- College: Arizona Western (2020–2023); UAB (2023–2025); Michigan (2025–2026)
- NBA draft: 2026: 1st round, 11th overall pick
- Drafted by: Golden State Warriors
- Playing career: 2026–present

Career history
- 2026–present: Golden State Warriors

Career highlights
- NCAA champion (2026); Consensus first-team All-American (2026); Big Ten Player of the Year (2026); First-team All-Big Ten (2026); Big Ten All-Defensive Team (2026); 2× First-team All-AAC (2024, 2025); 2× AAC Defensive Player of the Year (2024, 2025); AAC tournament MVP (2024); Second-team NJCAA All-American (2023); Third-team NJCAA All-American (2022)
- Stats at NBA.com
- Stats at Basketball Reference

Yaxel Okari Lendeborg (born September 30, 2002) is an American-Dominican basketball player for the Golden State Warriors of the National Basketball Association (NBA). He was picked 11th overall in the 2026 NBA draft. Lendeborg played college basketball for the Arizona Western Matadors, UAB Blazers, and Michigan Wolverines. He was an NCAA national champion, consensus All-American and the Big Ten Player of the Year with Michigan in 2026.

== Early life and high school career ==
=== Early life ===
Lendeborg was born on September 30, 2002, the son of Yissel Raposo and Okary Lendeborg. His mother, Yissel, played basketball and volleyball at American University of Puerto Rico. While she was living in Puerto Rico during college, she gave birth to him and he received American nationality as a result. His family then moved to Ohio when he was two years old. Lendeborg is also a Dominican national by descent, with both his parents having been natives and top basketball players in the country. When he was eight, he moved with his family to Pennsauken Township, New Jersey.

=== High school career ===
Lendeborg attended Pennsauken High School and tried out for the basketball team; he made the squad as a freshman, but was cut from the team mid-season due to poor academic performance.

Lendeborg missed the next two seasons due to poor grades. As a senior, he entered a dual-enrollment program with Camden County College and his grades improved enough that he was able to join the Pennsauken varsity basketball team with 11 games left in the season. In those 11 games, he helped Pennsauken compile a 10–1 record.

After high school, Lendeborg worked in a warehouse and did not initially expect to play college basketball, but his mother encouraged him to pursue it. After his family secured him a place at a showcase for players of Dominican descent, Arizona Western saw a clip of him on social media and offered him their final available scholarship. He signed to play for the Arizona Western Matadors.

== College career ==
=== Arizona Western ===
As a freshman at Arizona Western in 2020–21, Lendeborg played in a COVID-19 shortened season and averaged 6.1 points and 7.1 rebounds in 14 games. The following season, he appeared in 31 games and averaged 12.0 points and 11.0 rebounds per game, leading his conference in rebounds and was named a third-team National Junior College Athletic Association (NJCAA) All-American, first-team all-region, the Arizona Community College Athletic Conference (ACCAC) Player of the Year and the ACCAC Freshman of the Year. In the 2022–23 season with the Matadors, he was named a second-team All-American, first-team all-region and the ACCAC Player of the Year. Lendeborg averaged 17.2 points and an NJCAA-leading 13.0 rebounds per game in his final season.

Lendeborg played three seasons at Arizona Western College, appearing in 78 games. He finished his junior college career with an NJCAA all-time record with 870 total rebounds, after leading the NJCAA as he finished his final season with 429 rebounds. After finishing his career at Arizona Western, Lendeborg signed his national letter of intent to play for the St. John's Red Storm in November 2022. However, he was not retained after the hiring of new head coach Rick Pitino in 2023.

=== UAB ===
On April 29, 2023, Lendeborg transferred to the University of Alabama at Birmingham (UAB) to play for the Blazers following his career at Arizona Western. On November 25, 2023, in the sixth game of the season he recorded his first career NCAA double-double against Furman; scoring 19 points, ten rebounds and adding five blocked shots. On January 2, 2024, Lendeborg had 23 points, 15 rebounds and a career-high seven blocked shots against UTSA. On February 8, he scored 17 points and had a career-high 21 rebounds against Florida Atlantic and his future head coach Dusty May. In total during the 2023–24 season, he played in 35 games and averaged 13.8 points, 10.6 rebounds, 2.1 assists and 2.1 blocks per game, earning the American Athletic Conference (AAC) Defensive Player of the Year, the 2024 AAC tournament MVP and first-team All-AAC honors.

Lendeborg returned to UAB for a second season in 2024–25. On March 14, 2025, he scored 30 points, 20 rebounds, eight assists, five steals and four blocked shots against East Carolina in the 2025 AAC tournament. The points, assists and steals were each career highs. In 2024–25, Lendeborg repeated as an All-AAC first-team selection, and the AAC Defensive Player of the Year. He became the fifth player in UAB Blazers history to score 1,000 points in a span of two seasons.

Lendeborg started all 37 games for the Blazers, averaging 17.7 points, 11.4 rebounds, 4.2 assists, 1.8 blocks and 1.7 steals per game. At the end of the 2024–25 regular season, he led UAB in scoring, rebounding, assists, blocks and steals. He became one of only two players in NCAA Division I history to record over 600 points, 400 rebounds and 150 assists in a single season, joining legend Larry Bird. In addition, Lendeborg led the NCAA with 26 double-doubles and recorded a program single-season record of 420 total rebounds. Lendeborg also holds the program record with 45 career double-doubles, was the 25th member of the 1,000-point club (1,136), fifth in rebounds (790) and fourth in blocked shots (138). Following the season, he entered the NCAA transfer portal and was the No. 1 ranked player in the portal according to 247Sports, CBS Sports and On3.com, while The Athletic ranked him second and ESPN ranked him third.

=== Michigan ===
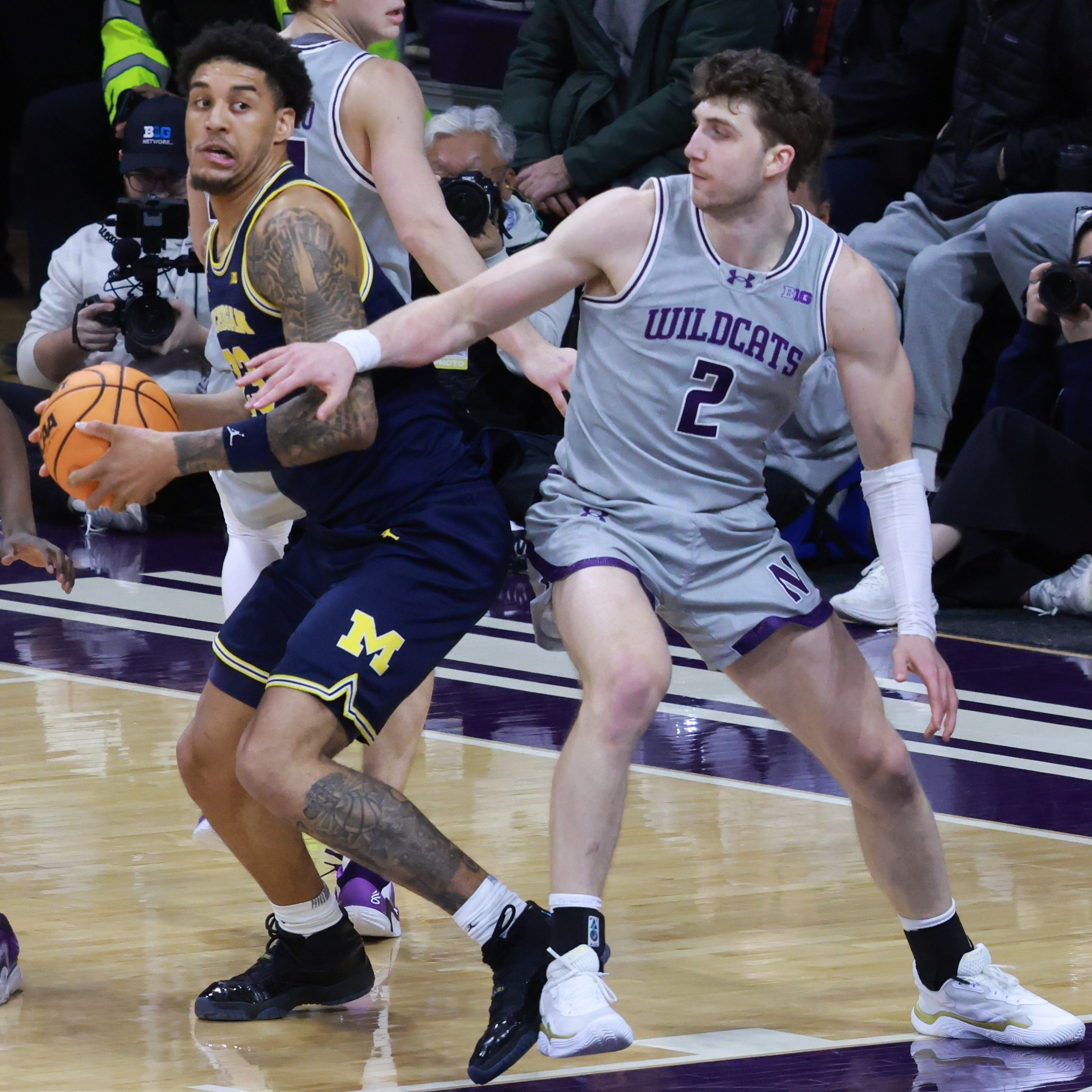
Lendeborg against Nick Martinelli in 2026

On April 5, 2025, Lendeborg transferred to the University of Michigan to play for Dusty May and the Wolverines. He also entered the 2025 NBA draft process. On May 27, he withdrew from the NBA draft and chose to play his final season of college basketball in Ann Arbor. Lendeborg was projected to be a late-first-round or early-second-round selection in the draft, with the potential to earn $2.7 million in the first year and $14 million total in a four-year rookie contract if selected in the late first round. Preseason estimates of Michigan's agreement with Lendeborg estimated that Michigan offered around $3 million in guaranteed name, image and likeness (NIL) compensation to sway him. It is believed that Michigan ended up giving Lendeborg about $5 million between NIL and revenue share and that this was less than the $7–9 million deal Kentucky had offered him.

Lendeborg was named a preseason first-team All-American by the Associated Press, Blue Ribbon Yearbook, ESPN and SB Nation; as well as a second-team selection by CBS Sports, Sports Illustrated, The Sporting News, and USA Today. He was Joe Lunardi and SB Nation’s preseason National Player of the Year. He was also named to the preseason Naismith College Player of the Year, NABC Player of the Year, and Karl Malone Award watchlists. Michigan teammate L.J. Cason nicknamed Lendeborg "Dominican LeBron" after Lendeborg blocked a shot and completed a transition dunk during a preseason practice.

On November 3, against Oakland, Lendeborg was limited in his debut with a right hand injury. He came off the bench and recorded 12 points (100% shooting: 4 FG, 2 FT), four rebounds and three assists. In late November, he led the Wolverines to a championship in the 2025 Players Era Festival, defeating San Diego State by 40 points, No. 21 Auburn by 30 points and No. 12 Gonzaga by 40 points. Lendeborg was named the Players Era Championship MVP after averaging 17.3 points, 7.3 rebounds, 3.7 assists, 2.0 steals and 1.3 blocks per game. He was also named as the week four Big Ten Conference Player of the Week and the Associated Press National Player of the Week. On December 13 against Maryland, Lendeborg had a season-high 29 points, career-high nine assists, eight rebounds, three blocks and two steals. Lendeborg was named on the January 25-person Wooden Award midseason watchlist.

On January 30, 2026, Michigan defeated No. 7 Michigan State in their in-state rivalry game, 83–71, behind 26 points and 12 rebounds from Lendeborg, his fourth double-double of the season. On February 8, Michigan defeated Ohio State 82–61 in the rivalry rematch. Lendeborg posted 14 points and a season-high 14 rebounds. He was named to the February 20-person Wooden late midseason watchlist, which clarified that the official final ballot would be a 15-man list. On March 8, Lendeborg scored 27 points in a win against No. 8 Michigan State. Michigan finished as the Big Ten regular-season champions and with an all-time conference record for wins, 19–1. In his two games versus the Spartans he scored 53 points.

After the regular season, Lendeborg was named Big Ten Player of the Year by both the coaches and media, Michigan's first player of the year honoree since Nik Stauskas in 2014. Lendeborg was also named first-team All-Big Ten by the coaches and media, the conference's only unanimous first-team selection by the latter, and joined his teammates Morez Johnson Jr. and Aday Mara on the Big Ten All-Defensive Team. Nationally, Lendeborg was selected as a consensus first-team All-American by the four major selectors: Associated Press, National Association of Basketball Coaches, The Sporting News, and the U.S. Basketball Writers Association. He became the ninth consensus All-American in Michigan basketball history, 11th all-time selection, and the first since Trey Burke in 2013. He was also a first-team selection by Bleacher Report, ESPN, and others.

On March 14, in the 2026 Big Ten tournament semifinal against Wisconsin, Lendeborg made the game-winning three-point shot with 0.4 seconds remaining to advance to the championship game. In the 2026 NCAA tournament, Lendeborg was named the Midwest Region MVP, as Michigan advanced to the Final Four. He became the first Michigan player to score at least 20 points in three consecutive NCAA tournament games since Juwan Howard in 1994. On April 6, he won the 2026 national championship as Michigan defeated UConn, 69–63, to win the program's first national title since 1989. For the season, he led the nation in plus-minus.

== Professional career ==
=== Golden State Warriors (2026–present) ===
On June 23, 2026, Lendeborg was selected with the 11th overall pick by the Golden State Warriors in the 2026 NBA draft. To celebrate, he held a private draft night party with family, teammates, and supporters at a Peerspace venue in Manhattan. When he was drafted, his mother, Yissel Raposo, was undergoing treatment for appendix cancer. Lendeborg credited her persistence and support for his success in college basketball and reaching the NBA. At 23, he was the oldest player selected in the first round of the 2026 NBA draft and at least three years older than each of the ten players chosen before him. He became one of three teammates from the Michigan Wolverines to be drafted in the lottery, joining Aday Mara and Morez Johnson Jr. On July 1, 2026, Lendeborg signed his first professional contract with the Warriors. The rookie-scale contract was worth $28.1 million over four years, including $12.5 million guaranteed. The third and fourth seasons are team options. The next day, Lendeborg was announced to participate with the team during the 2026 NBA Summer League, along with fellow draftee Lajae Jones (2026 No. 54 pick). In his July 3 California Classic Summer League debut, he scored 19 points on a perfect shooting night (6-of-6 field goals with 4-of-4 on three-point shots) with five rebounds and six assists against the Los Angeles Lakers' summer league team. He led the Warriors to the 2026 NBA Summer League Championship, earning the Summer League Championship game MVP for his 21 points, 10 rebounds, two assists and two steals in an 94–90 win. Lendeborg concluded the Summer League with averages of 14.8 points, 6.8 rebounds, and 4.0 assists in 28.3 minutes per game. He was recognized as the MVP of the Summer League based on a vote of all 30 teams.

On October 21, Lendeborg made his NBA regular season debut against the Los Angeles Lakers. He trash-talked and jawed with Lakers superstar, Luka Dončić, throughout the first half, resulting in a technical foul. After the game, Lendeborg said he "lost all respect" for Dončić due to all his foul-baiting and complaining. Some criticized Lendeborg's decision to trash-talk Dončić, but others, including his teammate Draymond Green, praised it. Lendeborg finished with 12 points, three rebounds, two assists, and one steal in a 127–105 loss. On October 23, he posted his first NBA career double-double with an 18-point,13-rebound outing, but the Warriors blew a 12-point lead in the final 3:47, losing to the Memphis Grizzlies 111–108. With Steph Curry, Draymond Green, Al Horford and Brandin Podziemski sidelined, Lendeborg increased his career-high scoring total again with a team-high 26 points (including 6 three-point shots) against the Phoenix Suns. On October 26, Lendeborg put up a then career-high 31 points, 12 rebounds, and six assists in a 134–114 win over the Denver Nuggets, leading the previously 0–3 Warriors to their first victory of the season. His 87 points through his first four career games are the most by a Warriors rookie since Wilt Chamberlain for the 1959-60 Philadelphia Warriors and he became the first Warrior rookie to post 30+ points, 10+ rebounds and 5+ assists since Curry for the 2009–10 Golden State Warriors. With 85+ points and 35+ rebounds in his first four NBA games, he joined Patrick Ewing, David Robinson and Shaquille O'Neal as the only players to do so since 1985-86. When Lendeborg scored 26 points in his fifth NBA game against the Minnesota Timberwolves on October 28, his 113 points through his first five career games became one of the three highest-scoring (Kevin Durant and Paolo Banchero) NBA 5-game debuts since 2000. In his October 30 rematch against Doncic's Lakers, Lendeborg fouled out with five turnovers, a -20 plus-minus and only six points, but the Warriors won, 112–95. On November 1 in a 124–112 win over the Los Angeles Clippers with Curry and Green sidelined again, Lendeborg put up a career-high 37 points, which was the most by a Warrior rookie since Curry posted 42 on April 14, 2010.

== National team career ==
In August 2022, Lendeborg represented the Dominican Republic national select team in an exhibition against the Kentucky Wildcats in the Bahamas. Both his parents also played for the Dominican Republic national team. He will represent the Dominican Republic in an attempt to qualify the team for the 2028 Summer Olympics in Los Angeles.

== Career statistics ==
Legend
GP	Games played	GS	Games started	MPG	Minutes per game
FG%	Field goal percentage	3P%	3-point field goal percentage	FT%	Free throw percentage
RPG	Rebounds per game	APG	Assists per game	SPG	Steals per game
BPG	Blocks per game	PPG	Points per game	**Bold**	Career high

=== College ===
==== NJCAA ====
Year	Team	GP	GS	MPG	FG%	3P%	FT%	RPG	APG	SPG	BPG	PPG
2020–21	Arizona Western	14	4	19.2	.714	.000	.552	7.1	0.6	0.5	0.6	6.1
2021–22	Arizona Western	31	30	30.4	.607	.357	.722	11.0	2.6	1.2	1.5	12.0
2022–23	Arizona Western	33	26	30.0	.727	.438	.647	13.0	2.6	1.5	1.4	17.2
**Career**		**78**	**60**	**28.2**	**.679**	**.387**	**.667**	**11.2**	**2.2**	**1.2**	**1.3**	**13.2**

==== NCAA ====
Year	Team	GP	GS	MPG	FG%	3P%	FT%	RPG	APG	SPG	BPG	PPG
2023–24	UAB	35	31	30.1	.513	.333	.800	10.6	2.1	0.7	2.1	13.8
2024–25	UAB	37	37	33.6	.522	.357	.757	11.4	4.2	1.7	1.8	17.7
2025–26	Michigan	40	39	30.2	.515	.372	.824	6.8	3.2	1.1	1.2	15.1
**Career**		**112**	**107**	**31.3**	**.517**	**.364**	**.792**	**9.5**	**3.2**	**1.2**	**1.7**	**15.5**
