= Tucker DeVries =

American basketball player (born 2002)

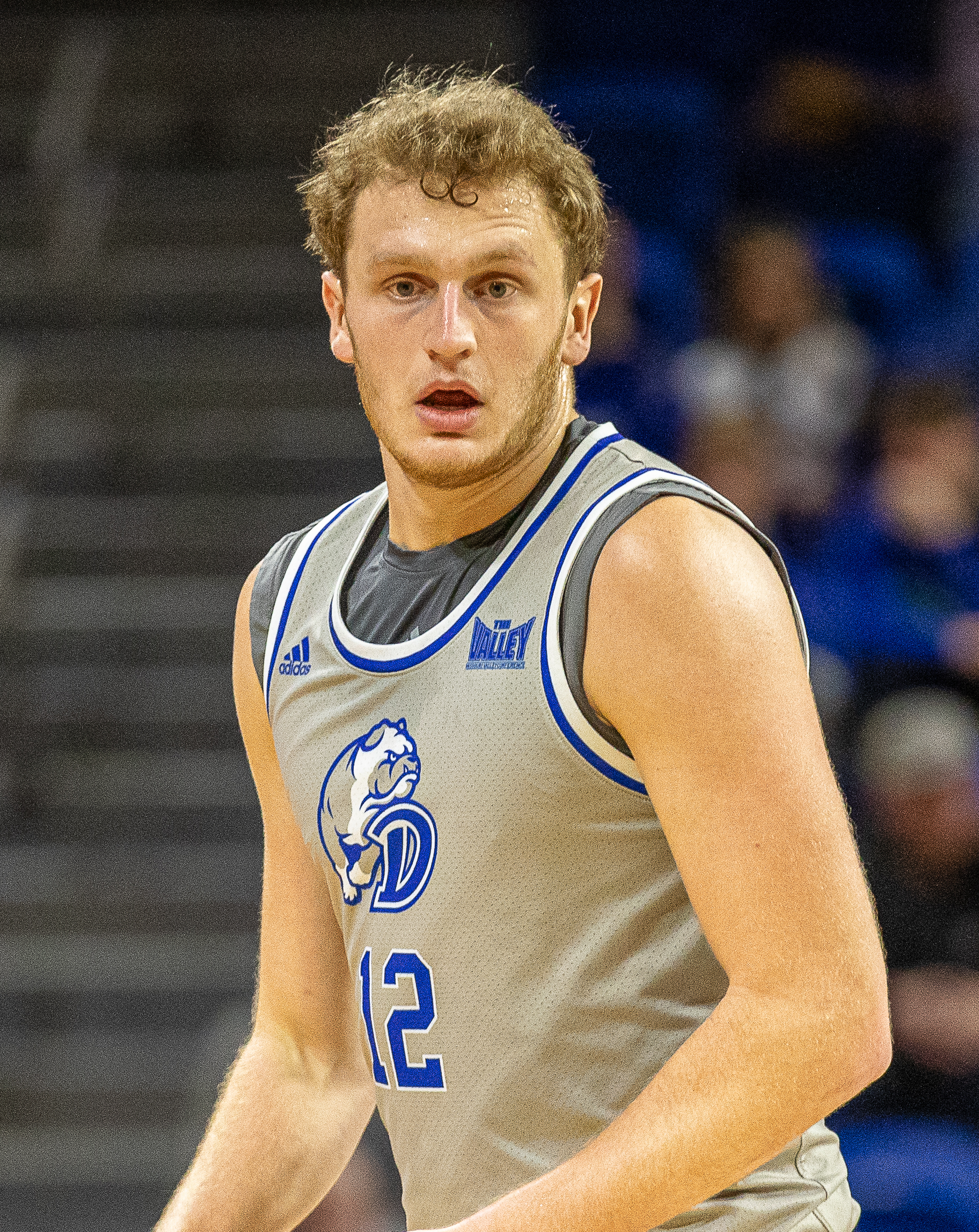
- DeVries with Drake in 2024

No. 22 – Maine Celtics
- Position: Small forward
- League: NBA G League

Personal information
- Born: December 7, 2002 (age 23) Omaha, Nebraska, U.S.
- Listed height: 6 ft 7 in (2.01 m)
- Listed weight: 215 lb (98 kg)

Career information
- High school: Elkhorn South (Omaha, Nebraska); Waukee (Waukee, Iowa)
- College: Drake (2021–2024); West Virginia (2024–2025); Indiana (2025–2026)
- NBA draft: 2026: undrafted
- Playing career: 2026–present

Career history
- 2026–present: Maine Celtics

Career highlights
- AP All-American Honorable Mention (2024); 2× MVC Player of the Year (2023, 2024); 2× First-team All-MVC (2023, 2024); Second-team All-MVC (2022); MVC Freshman of the Year (2022); 2× MVC tournament MVP (2023, 2024); Iowa Mr. Basketball (2021)
- Stats at NBA.com
- Stats at Basketball Reference

Tucker Dale DeVries (born December 7, 2002) is an American professional basketball player for the Maine Celtics of the NBA G League. He played college basketball for the Drake Bulldogs, West Virginia Mountaineers and Indiana Hoosiers.

== Early life and high school career ==
DeVries grew up in Omaha, Nebraska, and initially attended Elkhorn South High School. After his freshman year he moved with his family to Waukee, Iowa, and enrolled at Waukee High School after his father, Darian DeVries, was hired as the head men's basketball coach at Drake University. He played alongside future Iowa commits Payton Sandfort and Pryce Sandfort, and Iowa State commit Omaha Biliew. As a senior, DeVries was named Iowa Mr. Basketball after he averaged 18.5 points, 6.6 rebounds, 5.6 assists, and 2.9 steals per game. He was rated a four-star recruit and the best overall recruit from his class in the state of Iowa. DeVries committed to playing for his father at Drake over offers from Iowa State, Oregon, and Creighton.

== College career ==
=== Drake ===
DeVries became a starter at small forward for the Drake Bulldogs early in his freshman season. He finished his freshman season averaging 13.9 points, 4.6 rebounds, and 2.1 assists per game and was named the Missouri Valley Conference (MVC) Freshman of the Year and second team all-conference. DeVries was named the preseason MVC Player of the Year entering his sophomore season.

At the conclusion of the 2022–23 season, DeVries was named MVC Player of the Year. He was named the Most Valuable Player of the 2023 Missouri Valley Conference men's basketball tournament after scoring 22 points in the final against Bradley. The following year, DeVries' junior campaign, he repeated as the MVC Player of the Year after averaging 21.9 points, 6.9 rebounds, 3.5 assists and 1.7 steals during the regular season. He joined Lewis Lloyd as Drake players to pick up MVC Player of the Year status for two straight seasons. DeVries repeated as the MVP of the MVC Conference tournament after scoring 27 points with seven rebounds and five assists in a 84–80 win over Indiana State in the 2024 championship game.

=== West Virginia ===
Just three days after the conclusion of the 2024 season, it was announced that Drake head coach and Tucker's father, Darian DeVries, would fill the vacant position at West Virginia. Shortly thereafter, it was announced that Tucker would follow his father to the new program. After being sidelined since an early December victory over Georgetown, it was announced that DeVries would undergo season-ending shoulder surgery. In May 2025, he received a Regents Bachelor of Arts degree from West Virginia.

=== Indiana ===
After the conclusion of the 2025 season, DeVries' father accepted the head coaching job at Indiana and DeVries subsequently entered the transfer portal and transferred to Indiana. Following his first week of regular season play, he was awarded Player of the Week.

== Professional career ==
DeVries went undrafted in the 2026 NBA Draft and joined the Boston Celtics for the 2026 NBA Summer League.

== Career statistics ==
Legend
GP	Games played	GS	Games started	MPG	Minutes per game
FG%	Field goal percentage	3P%	3-point field goal percentage	FT%	Free throw percentage
RPG	Rebounds per game	APG	Assists per game	SPG	Steals per game
BPG	Blocks per game	PPG	Points per game	**Bold**	Career high

=== College ===
Year	Team	GP	GS	MPG	FG%	3P%	FT%	RPG	APG	SPG	BPG	PPG
2021–22	Drake	**36**	29	29.8	.416	.339	.775	4.6	2.1	1.0	**.8**	13.9
2022–23	Drake	34	**34**	32.9	**.446**	.373	.838	5.7	1.8	1.1	.2	18.6
2023–24	Drake	34	**34**	**35.5**	.444	.363	.813	**6.7**	**3.7**	1.6	.3	**21.6**
2024–25	West Virginia	8	8	34.5	.412	**.473**	.821	4.9	2.8	**1.8**	**1.5**	14.9
2025–26	Indiana	32	32	34.2	.397	.333	**.859**	5.3	3.3	1.1	0.6	13.7
**Career**		**144**	**137**	**33.1**	**.428**	**.359**	**.820**	**5.5**	**2.7**	**1.2**	**.5**	**16.8**

== Personal life ==
Devries’ father, Darian, played college basketball at Northern Iowa and was an assistant coach at Creighton for 18 years before becoming the head coach at Drake and then West Virginia. He was hired as head coach at Indiana University in 2025. His uncle, Jared, was an All-American defensive end at Iowa and played in the NFL for the Detroit Lions.
