= Pryce Sandfort =

American basketball player (born 2004)

No. 21 – Nebraska Cornhuskers
- Position: Small forward
- League: Big Ten Conference

Personal information
- Born: June 23, 2004 (age 22)
- Listed height: 6 ft 7 in (2.01 m)
- Listed weight: 210 lb (95 kg)

Career information
- High school: Waukee (Waukee, Iowa); Waukee Northwest (Waukee, Iowa)
- College: Iowa (2023–2025); Nebraska (2025–present)

Career highlights
- First-team All-Big Ten (2026); Iowa Mr. Basketball (2023)

Pryce Sandfort (born June 23, 2004) is an American college basketball player for the Nebraska Cornhuskers of the Big Ten Conference. He previously played for the Iowa Hawkeyes.

== Early life and high school ==
Sandfort grew up in Waukee, Iowa and attended Waukee High School for two years where he played alongside Tucker DeVries and Omaha Biliew, winning a state title as a sophomore. He joined Waukee Northwest High School for his junior season where he played basketball and golf. He averaged 26.6 points, 10.3 rebounds, 2.9 blocks, 2.8 assists and 1.4 steals per game as a junior. As a senior, Sandfort averaged 24.9 points, 11 rebounds, 2.8 assists, 2.7 blocks and 1.7 steals per game. He was named 2023 Iowa Mr. Basketball. A three-star prospect, Sandfort was ranked the No. 135 player overall nationally according to 247 Sports. In August 2022, he committed to play college basketball at Iowa, choosing the Hawkeyes over offers from Clemson, Drake, Nebraska, Seton Hall and Washington State.

== College career ==
As a freshman for the Iowa Hawkeyes, Sandfort came off the bench and averaged 2.3 points and 1.1 rebounds per game while shooting nearly 35 percent from 3-point range. As a sophomore, Sandfort averaged 8.8 points and 2.9 rebounds per game, shooting 40 percent from behind the arc. He entered the transfer portal after the Hawkeyes fired coach Fran McCaffery.

Sandfort transferred to play for the Nebraska Cornhuskers. On December 13, 2025, Sandfort scored a career-high 32 points in an 83-80 win over Illinois. He was named Big Ten co-Player of the Week on December 15 alongside Indiana’s Lamar Wilkerson. Sandford helped Nebraska reach its first-ever Sweet 16 while averaging 18.1 points per game. He announced he was returning to school after the season.

== Personal life ==
Sandfort's older brother, Payton, played college basketball at Iowa; he now plays for the Iowa Wolves in the NBA G League. His mother Gretchen played basketball at Simpson College, while his father Brian played basketball at Hastings College. His grandfather was a basketball coach and coached against Fred Hoiberg when he was a player.
