= Wisconsin Badgers men's basketball statistical leaders =

The Wisconsin Badgers men's basketball statistical leaders are individual statistical leaders of the Wisconsin Badgers men's basketball program in various categories, including points, three-pointers, assists, blocks, rebounds, and steals. Within those areas, the lists identify single-game, single-season, and career leaders. The Badgers represent the University of Wisconsin in the NCAA's Big Ten Conference.

Wisconsin began competing in intercollegiate basketball in 1906. However, the school's record book does not generally list records from before the 1950s, as records from before this period are often incomplete and inconsistent. Since scoring was much lower in this era, and teams played much fewer games during a typical season, it is likely that few or no players from this era would appear on these lists anyway.

The NCAA did not officially record assists as a stat until the 1983–84 season, and blocks and steals until the 1985–86 season, but Wisconsin's record books includes players in these stats before these seasons. These lists are updated through the end of the 2024–25 season.

== Scoring ==
Career
| Rk | Player | Points | Seasons |
|---|---|---|---|
| 1 | Alando Tucker | 2,217 | 2002–03 2003–04 2004–05 2005–06 2006–07 |
| 2 | Michael Finley | 2,147 | 1991–92 1992–93 1993–94 1994–95 |
| 3 | Ethan Happ | 2,130 | 2015–16 2016–17 2017–18 2018–19 |
| 4 | Nigel Hayes | 1,857 | 2013–14 2014–15 2015–16 2016–17 |
| 5 | Danny Jones | 1,854 | 1986–87 1987–88 1988–89 1989–90 |
| 6 | Brad Davison | 1,827 | 2017–18 2018–19 2019–20 2020–21 2021–22 |
| 7 | Claude Gregory | 1,745 | 1977–78 1978–79 1979–80 1980–81 |
| 8 | Rick Olson | 1,736 | 1982–83 1983–84 1984–85 1985–86 |
| 9 | Trent Jackson | 1,545 | 1985–86 1986–87 1987–88 1988–89 |
| 10 | Jordan Taylor | 1,533 | 2008–09 2009–10 2010–11 2011–12 |

Season
| Rk | Player | Points | Season |
|---|---|---|---|
| 1 | Frank Kaminsky | 732 | 2014–15 |
| 2 | Nick Boyd | 726 | 2025–26 |
| 3 | John Tonje | 724 | 2024–25 |
| 4 | Alando Tucker | 716 | 2006–07 |
| 5 | John Blackwell | 650 | 2025–26 |
| 6 | Devin Harris | 624 | 2003–04 |
| 7 | Jon Leuer | 621 | 2010–11 |
| 8 | Michael Finley | 620 | 1992–93 |
| 9 | Jordan Taylor | 617 | 2010–11 |
| 10 | Johnny Davis | 612 | 2021–22 |

Single game
| Rk | Player | Points | Season | Opponent |
|---|---|---|---|---|
| 1 | Frank Kaminsky | 43 | 2013–14 | North Dakota |
| 2 | Ken Barnes | 42 | 1964–65 | Indiana |
| | Michael Finley | 42 | 1994–95 | Eastern Michigan |
| 4 | John Tonje | 41 | 2024–25 | Arizona |
| 5 | Rick Olson | 39 | 1983–84 | Michigan |
| | Jordan Taylor | 39 | 2010–11 | Indiana |
| 7 | Joe Franklin | 38 | 1967–68 | Michigan State |
| | Dale Koehler | 38 | 1974–75 | Iowa |
| | Devin Harris | 38 | 2003–04 | Minnesota |
| | Alando Tucker | 38 | 2005–06 | Eastern Kentucky |
| | Nick Boyd | 38 | 2025–26 | Illinois |

== Rebounds ==
Career
| Rk | Player | Rebounds | Seasons |
|---|---|---|---|
| 1 | Ethan Happ | 1,217 | 2015–16 2016–17 2017–18 2018–19 |
| 2 | Claude Gregory | 904 | 1977–78 1978–79 1979–80 1980–81 |
| 3 | Joe Franklin | 858 | 1965–66 1966–67 1967–68 |
| 4 | Mike Wilkinson | 856 | 2001–02 2002–03 2003–04 2004–05 |
| 5 | Steven Crowl | 854 | 2020–21 2021–22 2022–23 2023–24 2024–25 |
| 6 | Joe Chrnelich | 841 | 1976–77 1977–78 1978–79 1979–80 |
| 7 | Kim Hughes | 806 | 1971–72 1972–73 1973–74 |
| 8 | Nigel Hayes | 802 | 2013–14 2014–15 2015–16 2016–17 |
| 9 | Tyler Wahl | 800 | 2019–20 2020–21 2021–22 2022–23 2023–24 |
| 10 | Alando Tucker | 769 | 2002–03 2003–04 2004–05 2005–06 2006–07 |

Season
| Rk | Player | Rebounds | Season |
|---|---|---|---|
| 1 | Jim Clinton | 344 | 1950–51 |
| 2 | Ethan Happ | 342 | 2018–19 |
| 3 | Joe Franklin | 334 | 1967–68 |
| 4 | Ethan Happ | 332 | 2016–17 |
| 5 | Frank Kaminsky | 320 | 2014–15 |
| 6 | Jack Brens | 306 | 1962–63 |
| 7 | Kim Hughes | 301 | 1972–73 |
| 8 | Paul Morrow | 290 | 1951–52 |
| 9 | Joe Franklin | 289 | 1966–67 |
| 10 | Rashard Griffith | 281 | 1994–95 |

Single game
| Rk | Player | Rebounds | Season | Opponent |
|---|---|---|---|---|
| 1 | Paul Morrow | 30 | 1952–53 | Purdue |
| 2 | Joe Franklin | 27 | 1967–68 | Purdue |
| 3 | Mark Zubor | 26 | 1963–64 | Gonzaga |
| 4 | Joe Chrnelich | 25 | 1976–77 | St. Mary's |
| 5 | Curt Mueller | 23 | 1955–56 | Northwestern |
| | Jack Brens | 23 | 1962–63 | St. John's |
| | Ken Barnes | 23 | 1964–65 | Indiana |
| | Joe Franklin | 23 | 1966–67 | Illinois |
| 9 | Jack Brens | 22 | 1962–63 | Illinois |
| | Kerry Hughes | 22 | 1973–74 | Iowa |

== Assists ==
Career
| Rk | Player | Assists | Seasons |
|---|---|---|---|
| 1 | Tracy Webster | 501 | 1991–92 1992–93 1993–94 |
| 2 | Jordan Taylor | 464 | 2008–09 2009–10 2010–11 2011–12 |
| 3 | D'Mitrik Trice | 430 | 2016–17 2017–18 2018–19 2019–20 2020–21 |
| 4 | Ethan Happ | 423 | 2015–16 2016–17 2017–18 2018–19 |
| 5 | Mike Heineman | 388 | 1983–84 1984–85 1985–86 1986–87 |
| 6 | Michael Finley | 371 | 1991–92 1992–93 1993–94 1994–95 |
| 7 | Mike Kelley | 344 | 1997–98 1998–99 1999–00 2000–01 |
| 8 | Brad Davison | 343 | 2017–18 2018–19 2019–20 2020–21 2021–22 |
| 9 | Tom Molaski | 335 | 1985–86 1986–87 1987–88 1988–89 |
| 10 | Nigel Hayes | 319 | 2013–14 2014–15 2015–16 2016–17 |

Season
| Rk | Player | Assists | Season |
|---|---|---|---|
| 1 | Tracy Webster | 179 | 1992–93 |
| 2 | Tracy Webster | 171 | 1993–94 |
| 3 | Jordan Taylor | 161 | 2010–11 |
| 4 | Ethan Happ | 153 | 2018–19 |
| 5 | Tracy Webster | 151 | 1991–92 |
| | Traevon Jackson | 151 | 2013–14 |
| 7 | Nick Boyd | 149 | 2025–26 |
| 8 | Jordan Taylor | 147 | 2011–12 |
| 9 | Devin Harris | 141 | 2003–04 |
| 10 | Mike Heineman | 137 | 1986–87 |
| | Chucky Hepburn | 137 | 2023–24 |

Single game
| Rk | Player | Assists | Season | Opponent |
|---|---|---|---|---|
| 1 | Wes Matthews | 13 | 1979–80 | Army |
| | Tracy Webster | 13 | 1991–92 | Michigan |
| 3 | Tracy Webster | 12 | 1992–93 | Coastal Carolina |
| | Mike Kelley | 12 | 2000–01 | Maryland |
| | Ethan Happ | 12 | 2018–19 | Coppin State |
| 6 | Dick Cable | 11 | 1952–53 | California |
| | Jim Smith | 11 | 1976–77 | Northwestern |
| | Joe Chrnelich | 11 | 1977–78 | Canisius |
| | Wes Matthews | 11 | 1978–79 | Northwestern |
| | Mike Heineman | 11 | 1984–85 | Northwestern |
| | Ethan Happ | 11 | 2018–19 | Northwestern |

== Steals ==
Career
| Rk | Player | Steals | Seasons |
|---|---|---|---|
| 1 | Mike Kelley | 275 | 1997–98 1998–99 1999–00 2000–01 |
| 2 | Ethan Happ | 217 | 2015–16 2016–17 2017–18 2018–19 |
| 3 | Tracy Webster | 183 | 1991–92 1992–93 1993–94 |
| 4 | Trévon Hughes | 177 | 2006–07 2007–08 2008–09 2009–10 |
| 5 | Michael Flowers | 171 | 2004–05 2005–06 2006–07 2007–08 |
| 6 | Mike Wilkinson | 169 | 2001–02 2002–03 2003–04 2004–05 |
| 7 | Michael Finley | 168 | 1991–92 1992–93 1993–94 1994–95 |
| 8 | Tyler Wahl | 166 | 2019–20 2020–21 2021–22 2022–23 2023–24 |
| 9 | Devin Harris | 164 | 2001–02 2002–03 2003–04 |
| 10 | Chucky Hepburn | 161 | 2021–22 2022–23 2023–24 |

Season
| Rk | Player | Steals | Season |
|---|---|---|---|
| 1 | Mike Kelley | 95 | 1999–00 |
| 2 | Chucky Hepburn | 73 | 2023–24 |
| 3 | Tracy Webster | 69 | 1993–94 |
| 4 | Ethan Happ | 67 | 2016–17 |
| 5 | Tracy Webster | 66 | 1992–93 |
| 6 | Devin Harris | 65 | 2002–03 |
| 7 | Ty Calderwood | 63 | 1996–97 |
| | Ethan Happ | 63 | 2015–16 |
| 9 | Mike Kelley | 62 | 1998–99 |
| | Trevon Hughes | 62 | 2007–08 |

Single game
| Rk | Player | Steals | Season | Opponent |
|---|---|---|---|---|
| 1 | Michael Finley | 10 | 1992–93 | Purdue |
| | Mike Kelley | 10 | 1999–00 | Texas |
| 3 | Mike Heineman | 9 | 1984–85 | Morgan State |
| 4 | Mike Kelley | 8 | 1998–99 | Illinois State |

== Blocks ==
Career
| Rk | Player | Blocks | Seasons |
|---|---|---|---|
| 1 | Nate Reuvers | 184 | 2017–18 2018–19 2019–20 2020–21 |
| 2 | Ethan Happ | 154 | 2015–16 2016–17 2017–18 2018–19 |
| 3 | Frank Kaminsky | 153 | 2011–12 2012–13 2013–14 2014–15 |
| 4 | Jared Berggren | 144 | 2009–10 2010–11 2011–12 2012–13 |
| 5 | Rashard Griffith | 124 | 1993–94 1994–95 |
| 6 | Brad Sellers | 120 | 1981–82 1982–83 |
| 7 | Mike Wilkinson | 117 | 2001–02 2002–03 2003–04 2004–05 |
| 8 | Kurt Portmann | 102 | 1986–87 1987–88 1988–89 1989–90 |
| 9 | Marcus Landry | 99 | 2005–06 2006–07 2007–08 2008–09 |
| 10 | Greg Stiemsma | 96 | 2004–05 2005–06 2006–07 2007–08 |

Season
| Rk | Player | Blocks | Season |
|---|---|---|---|
| 1 | Jared Berggren | 73 | 2012–13 |
| 2 | Brad Sellers | 68 | 1982–83 |
| 3 | Rashard Griffith | 66 | 1993–94 |
| | Frank Kaminsky | 66 | 2013–14 |
| 5 | Jared Berggren | 60 | 2011–12 |
| | Nate Reuvers | 60 | 2018–19 |
| 7 | Rashard Griffith | 58 | 1994–95 |
| | Nate Reuvers | 58 | 2019–20 |
| 9 | Frank Kaminsky | 57 | 2014–15 |
| 10 | Brad Sellers | 52 | 1981–82 |

Single game
| Rk | Player | Blocks | Season | Opponent |
|---|---|---|---|---|
| 1 | Brad Sellers | 9 | 1982–83 | Toledo |
| | Nate Reuvers | 9 | 2018–19 | Stanford |
| | Nate Reuvers | 9 | 2019–20 | Eastern Illinois |
| 4 | Kim Hughes | 8 | 1973–74 | Rollins |
| 5 | Brad Sellers | 7 | 1981–82 | Minnesota |
| | Brad Sellers | 7 | 1982–83 | Ball State |
| | Jared Berggren | 7 | 2011–12 | Montana |
| | Jared Berggren | 7 | 2012–13 | Iowa |
| | Frank Kaminsky | 7 | 2014–15 | Green Bay |
