= 2025–26 Wisconsin Badgers men's basketball team =

American college basketball season

2025–26 Wisconsin Badgers men's basketball

NCAA tournament, First round
- Conference: Big Ten Conference

Ranking
- Coaches: No. 25
- AP: No. 25
- Record: 24–11 (14–6 Big Ten)
- Head coach: Greg Gard (11th season)
- Associate head coach: Joe Krabbenhoft (10th season)
- Assistant coaches: Sharif Chambliss (5th season); Lance Randall (2nd season)
- Home arena: Kohl Center

2025–26 Big Ten Conference men's basketball standings
	Conf.				Overall
Team	W		L	PCT	W		L	PCT
No. 1 Michigan	19	–	1	.950	37	–	3	.925
No. 14 Nebraska	15	–	5	.750	28	–	7	.800
No. 5 Illinois	15	–	5	.750	28	–	9	.757
No. 11 Michigan State	15	–	5	.750	27	–	8	.771
No. 25 Wisconsin	14	–	6	.700	24	–	11	.686
No. 6 Purdue †	13	–	7	.650	30	–	9	.769
UCLA	13	–	7	.650	24	–	12	.667
Ohio State	12	–	8	.600	21	–	13	.618
No. 15 Iowa	10	–	10	.500	24	–	13	.649
Indiana	9	–	11	.450	18	–	14	.563
Minnesota	8	–	12	.400	15	–	18	.455
USC	7	–	13	.350	18	–	14	.563
Washington	7	–	13	.350	16	–	17	.485
Rutgers	6	–	14	.300	14	–	20	.412
Northwestern	5	–	15	.250	15	–	19	.441
Oregon	5	–	15	.250	12	–	20	.375
Maryland	4	–	16	.200	12	–	21	.364
Penn State	3	–	17	.150	12	–	20	.375
† 2026 Big Ten tournament winner Rankings from AP poll

The 2025–26 Wisconsin Badgers men's basketball team represented the University of Wisconsin–Madison in the 2025–26 NCAA Division I men's basketball season. The Badgers were led by 11th-year head coach Greg Gard and played their home games at the Kohl Center in Madison, Wisconsin as members of the Big Ten Conference. The Badgers finished 24–11 and 14–6 in Big Ten play, good for fifth place in the conference. In the Big Ten tournament, they defeated Washington and Illinois before falling to Michigan in the semifinals. As an at–large bid to the NCAA tournament, they were the No. 5 seed in the West region. They were upset in the first round by High Point.

== Previous season ==
The Badgers finished the 2024–25 season 27–10, 13–7 in Big Ten play to finish in a three-way tie for fourth place. As the No. 5 seed in the Big Ten tournament, they defeated Northwestern, UCLA, and Michigan State to advance to the championship of the for a second consecutive year where they lost to Michigan. They received an at–large bid to the NCAA tournament as the No. 3 seed in the East region. They defeated Montana in the first round before losing to BYU in the second round.

== Offseason ==
=== Departures ===
All players listed as "graduated" are tentative departures unless otherwise noted.

Wisconsin departures
Name	Number	Pos.	Height	Weight	Year	Hometown	Reason for departure
Camren Hunter	3	G	6'3"	200	Junior	Bryant, AR	Transferred to Central Arkansas
Kamari McGee	4	G	6'0"	180	Senior	Racine, WI	Graduated
Daniel Freitag	5	G	6'3"	195	Freshman	Bloomington, MN	Transferred to Buffalo
Carter Gilmore	7	F	6'7"	232	Graduate student	Hartland, WI	Graduated
John Tonje	9	G	6'6"	215	Graduate student	North Omaha, NE	Graduated/2025 NBA Draft; Selected 53rd overall by Utah Jazz
Max Klesmit	11	G	6'4"	200	Graduate student	Neenah, WI	Graduated
Xavier Amos	13	F	6'8"	215	Junior	Chicago, IL	Transferred to Loyola Chicago
Aidan Konop	14	G	6'2"	195	Freshman	Sussex, WI	Walk-on; Transferred/Not retained
Chris Hodges	21	F	6'9"	250	(redshirt) Junior	Schaumburg, IL	Transferred to Montana State
Steven Crowl	22	C	7'0"	247	Graduate student	Eagan, MN	Graduated
Markus Ilver	35	F	6'9"	225	Senior	Tallinn, Estonia	Graduated

=== Incoming transfers ===
Wisconsin incoming transfers
Name	Number	Pos.	Height	Weight	Year	Hometown	Previous school
Braeden Carrington	0	G	6'5"	197	Senior	Brooklyn Park, MN	Tulsa
Nick Boyd	2	G	6'3"	177	(redshirt) Senior	Garnerville, NY	San Diego State
Andrew Rohde	7	G	6'6"	197	Senior	Brookfield, WI	Virginia
Austin Rapp	22	F	6'10"	238	Sophomore	Melbourne, Australia	Portland

On July 1, 2025, the team signed Temple transfer Elijah Gray. However, on October 28, 2025, Gray was dismissed from the team for "events preceding his enrollment at UW-Madison."

=== Recruiting class ===
==== 2025 recruiting class ====
College recruiting
Name	Hometown	School	Height	Weight	Commit date
Zach Kizinger; G	De Pere, WI	De Pere High School	6 ft 3 in (1.91 m)	180 lb (82 kg)	Aug 4, 2024
Zach Kizinger; G	Recruit ratings: 247Sports: On3: ESPN: (83)				
Will Garlock; C	Middleton, WI	Middleton High School (WI)	6 ft 10 in (2.08 m)	235 lb (107 kg)	Jun 8, 2024
Will Garlock; C	Recruit ratings: 247Sports: On3: ESPN: (75)				
Hayden Jones; G	Nelson, New Zealand	Nelson Giants	6 ft 7 in (2.01 m)	200 lb (91 kg)	Jul 25, 2024
Hayden Jones; G	Recruit ratings: 247Sports: On3: (NR)				
Aleksas Bieliauskas; F	Kaunas, Lithuania	BC Žalgiris-2	6 ft 10 in (2.08 m)	235 lb (107 kg)	Apr 25, 2025
Aleksas Bieliauskas; F	Recruit ratings: 247Sports: (NR)				
Overall recruit ranking: Rivals: 59 247Sports: 51
Note: In many cases, Scout, Rivals, 247Sports, On3, and ESPN may conflict in their listings of height and weight.; In these cases, the average was taken. ESPN grades are on a 100-point scale.; Sources: "2025 Wisconsin Commitments". Rivals.; "ESPN- Wisconsin Badgers Men's Basketball Recruiting". ESPN.; "2025 Team Ranking". Rivals.

==== 2026 recruiting class ====
College recruiting (2026)
Name	Hometown	School	Height	Weight	Commit date
LaTrevion Fenderson; SG	Racine, WI	DME Academy	6 ft 4 in (1.93 m)	205 lb (93 kg)	Aug 25, 2024
LaTrevion Fenderson; SG	Recruit ratings: 247Sports: On3: (NR)				
Jackson Ball; SG	Napier, New Zealand	Illawarra Hawks	6 ft 4 in (1.93 m)	185 lb (84 kg)	Mar 3, 2025
Jackson Ball; SG	Recruit ratings: No ratings found				
Overall recruit ranking: Rivals: 107 247Sports: 106
Note: In many cases, Scout, Rivals, 247Sports, On3, and ESPN may conflict in their listings of height and weight.; In these cases, the average was taken. ESPN grades are on a 100-point scale.; Sources: "2026 Wisconsin Commitments". Rivals.; "ESPN- Wisconsin Badgers Men's Basketball Recruiting". ESPN.; "2026 Team Ranking". Rivals.

== Roster ==
2025–26 Wisconsin Badgers men's basketball team
Players
Coaches

Pos.	#	Name	Height	Weight	Year	Previous school	Hometown
G	0	Braeden Carrington	6 ft 5 in (1.96 m)	197 lb (89 kg)	Sr	Park Center HS/Minnesota/Tulsa	Brooklyn Park, Minnesota
G	2	Nick Boyd	6 ft 3 in (1.91 m)	177 lb (80 kg)	RS Sr	Don Bosco Prep/Florida Atlantic/San Diego State	Garnerville, New York
G	4	Zach Kizinger	6 ft 3 in (1.91 m)	150 lb (68 kg)	Fr	De Pere High School	De Pere, Wisconsin
G	5	Jack Janicki (injured)	6 ft 5 in (1.96 m)	200 lb (91 kg)	RS So	White Bear Lake Area High School	White Bear Lake, Minnesota
G	7	Andrew Rohde	6 ft 6 in (1.98 m)	195 lb (88 kg)	Sr	Brookfield Central/St. Thomas (MN)/Virginia	Milwaukee, Wisconsin
F	11	Jack Robison	6 ft 6 in (1.98 m)	198 lb (90 kg)	So	Lakeville North High School	Lakeville, Minnesota
G	13	Hayden Jones	6 ft 6 in (1.98 m)	198 lb (90 kg)	Fr	Nelson Giants	Nelson, New Zealand
G	15	Isaac Gard (W)	6 ft 3 in (1.91 m)	170 lb (77 kg)	Sr	Oregon High School	Oregon, Wisconsin
F	18	Riccardo Greppi	6 ft 10 in (2.08 m)	255 lb (116 kg)	So	Pallacanestro Cantù	Lecco, Italy
F	22	Austin Rapp	6 ft 10 in (2.08 m)	238 lb (108 kg)	So	South East Melbourne Phoenix/Portland	Melbourne, Australia
C	23	Will Garlock	7 ft 0 in (2.13 m)	243 lb (110 kg)	Fr	Middleton High School	Middleton, Wisconsin
G	25	John Blackwell	6 ft 4 in (1.93 m)	203 lb (92 kg)	Jr	Brother Rice High School	Bloomfield Hills, Michigan
F	31	Nolan Winter	7 ft 0 in (2.13 m)	235 lb (107 kg)	Jr	Lakeville North High School	Lakeville, Minnesota
F	32	Aleksas Bieliauskas	6 ft 10 in (2.08 m)	235 lb (107 kg)	Fr	BC Žalgiris-2	Kaunas, Lithuania

Head coach

- Greg Gard (UW-Platteville)

Assistant coach(es)

- Joe Krabbenhoft (Wisconsin)
- Sharif Chambliss (Wisconsin)
- Lance Randall (Beloit)

Legend

- (C) Team captain
- (S) Suspended
- (I) Ineligible
- (W) Walk-on
- Injured
- Current redshirt

Roster

== Schedule and results ==
Date time, TV	Rank^{#}	Opponent^{#}	Result	Record	High points	High rebounds	High assists	Site (attendance) city, state
Exhibition
October 24, 2025*; 7:00 p.m., B1G+	No. 24	vs. Oklahoma; The Bad Boy Mowers Series - Milwaukee	L 83–84	–	20 – Blackwell	6 – Tied	4 – Rohde	Fiserv Forum (2,344); Milwaukee, WI
October 29, 2025*; 7:00 p.m., B1G+	No. 24	UW–Platteville	W 69–53	–	17 – Winter	11 – Winter	3 – Winter	Kohl Center (14,014); Madison, WI
Regular season
November 3, 2025*; 7:00 p.m., B1G+	No. 24	Campbell	W 96–64	1–0	31 – Blackwell	12 – Winter	4 – Tied	Kohl Center (13,695); Madison, WI
November 7, 2025*; 7:30 p.m., BTN	No. 24	Northern Illinois	W 97–72	2–0	25 – Boyd	7 – Winter	3 – Tied	Kohl Center (15,222); Madison, WI
November 11, 2025*; 7:30 p.m., BTN	No. 24	Ball State	W 86–55	3–0	19 – Winter	10 – Winter	5 – Blackwell	Kohl Center (13,909); Madison, WI
November 17, 2025*; 7:00 p.m., BTN	No. 23	SIU Edwardsville	W 94–69	4–0	24 – Blackwell	8 – Tied	5 – Boyd	Kohl Center (13,797); Madison, WI
November 21, 2025*; 3:00 p.m., Peacock	No. 23	vs. No. 9 BYU; The Bad Boy Mowers Series - Salt Lake City	L 70–98	4–1	16 – Boyd	14 – Winter	2 – Tied	Delta Center (8,987); Salt Lake City, UT
November 27, 2025*; 4:30 p.m., FS1		vs. Providence; Rady Children's Invitational Semifinal	W 104–83	5–1	36 – Boyd	10 – Winter	7 – Boyd	Jenny Craig Pavilion (4,955); San Diego, CA
November 28, 2025*; 4:30 p.m., FOX		vs. TCU; Rady Children's Invitational Championship	L 63–74	5–2	30 – Blackwell	10 – Winter	3 – Tied	Jenny Craig Pavilion (5,008); San Diego, CA
December 3, 2025; 8:00 p.m., BTN		Northwestern	W 85–73	6–2 (1–0)	26 – Blackwell	11 – Blackwell	9 – Rohde	Kohl Center (14,345); Madison, WI
December 6, 2025*; 1:00 p.m., FS1		Marquette; Rivalry	W 96–76	7–2	30 – Blackwell	13 – Winter	4 – Tied	Kohl Center (16,838); Madison, WI
December 10, 2025; 8:00 p.m., BTN		at No. 23 Nebraska	L 60–90	7–3 (1–1)	20 – Boyd	6 – Winter	4 – Tied	Pinnacle Bank Arena (13,831); Lincoln, NE
December 19, 2025*; 7:00 p.m., FOX		vs. Villanova; Milwaukee Hoops Showdown	L 66–76 ^{OT}	7–4	23 – Winter	11 – Winter	4 – Boyd	Fiserv Forum (7,328); Milwaukee, WI
December 22, 2025*; 7:00 p.m., BTN		Central Michigan	W 88–61	8–4	18 – Tied	8 – Winter	9 – Janicki	Kohl Center (14,106); Madison, WI
December 30, 2025*; 6:00 p.m., BTN		Milwaukee	W 80–60	9–4	16 – Boyd	7 – Winter	4 – Blackwell	Kohl Center (15,570); Madison, WI
January 3, 2026; 7:00 p.m., FOX		No. 5 Purdue	L 73–89	9–5 (1–2)	24 – Boyd	10 – Winter	2 – Boyd	Kohl Center (15,421); Madison, WI
January 6, 2026; 8:00 p.m., Peacock		UCLA	W 80–72	10–5 (2–2)	20 – Boyd	8 – Tied	5 – Boyd	Kohl Center (13,644); Madison, WI
January 10, 2026; 12:00 p.m., CBS		at No. 2 Michigan	W 91–88	11–5 (3–2)	26 – Blackwell	9 – Carrington	6 – Boyd	Crisler Center (12,707); Ann Arbor, MI
January 13, 2026; 6:00 p.m., BTN		at Minnesota	W 78–75	12–5 (4–2)	27 – Blackwell	11 – Winter	5 – Blackwell	Williams Arena (10,914); Minneapolis, MN
January 17, 2026; 1:00 p.m., BTN		Rutgers	W 96–87	13–5 (5–2)	32 – Boyd	5 – Tied	9 – Boyd	Kohl Center (15,140); Madison, WI
January 22, 2026; 6:00 p.m., FS1		at Penn State	W 98–71	14–5 (6–2)	17 – Tied	10 – Winter	6 – Rohde	Rec Hall (5,774); University Park, PA
January 25, 2026; 3:00 p.m., Peacock		USC	L 71–73	14–6 (6–3)	29 – Boyd	9 – Blackwell	4 – Rohde	Kohl Center (15,216); Madison, WI
January 28, 2026; 8:00 p.m., BTN		Minnesota	W 67–63	15–6 (7–3)	23 – Blackwell	7 – Tied	5 – Boyd	Kohl Center (14,653); Madison, WI
January 31, 2026; 1:00 p.m., FOX		Ohio State	W 92–82	16–6 (8–3)	22 – Blackwell	11 – Winter	4 – Tied	Kohl Center (16,838); Madison, WI
February 7, 2026; 11:00 a.m., FOX		at Indiana	L 77–78 ^{OT}	16–7 (8–4)	26 – Winter	12 – Winter	6 – Boyd	Simon Skjodt Assembly Hall (17,222); Bloomington, IN
February 10, 2026; 7:00 p.m., Peacock		at No. 8 Illinois	W 92–90 ^{OT}	17–7 (9–4)	25 – Boyd	11 – Winter	5 – Boyd	State Farm Center (15,544); Champaign, IL
February 13, 2026; 7:00 p.m., FOX		No. 10 Michigan State	W 92–71	18–7 (10–4)	29 – Boyd	11 – Winter	4 – Boyd	Kohl Center (16,838); Madison, WI
February 17, 2026; 7:30 p.m., FS1	No. 24	at Ohio State	L 69–86	18–8 (10–5)	20 – Carrington	7 – Winter	4 – Blackwell	Value City Arena (9,006); Columbus, OH
February 22, 2026; 3:00 p.m., FS1	No. 24	Iowa	W 84–71	19–8 (11–5)	27 – Boyd	9 – Boyd	10 – Boyd	Kohl Center (16,838); Madison, WI
February 25, 2026; 10:00 p.m., BTN		at Oregon	L 71–85	19–9 (11–6)	22 – Blackwell	9 – Bieliauskas	7 – Boyd	Matthew Knight Arena (5,682); Eugene, OR
February 28, 2026; 3:00 p.m., FS1		at Washington	W 90–73	20–9 (12–6)	32 – Carrington	9 – Tied	5 – Boyd	Alaska Airlines Arena (8,755); Seattle, WA
March 4, 2026; 7:00 p.m., FS1		Maryland	W 78–45	21–9 (13–6)	18 – Carrington	6 – Winter	6 – Rohde	Kohl Center (16,838); Madison, WI
March 7, 2026; 3:00 p.m., CBS		at No. 15 Purdue	W 97–93	22–9 (14–6)	25 – Blackwell	4 – Blackwell	5 – Tied	Mackey Arena (14,876); West Lafayette, IN
Big Ten Tournament
March 12, 2026; 1:30 p.m., BTN	(5) No. 23	vs. (12) Washington; Third round	W 85–82	23–9	34 – Blackwell	10 – Blackwell	9 – Boyd	United Center (16,157); Chicago, IL
March 13, 2026; 1:30 p.m., BTN	(5) No. 23	vs. (4) No. 9 Illinois; Quarterfinal	W 91–88 ^{OT}	24–9	38 – Boyd	9 – Tied	6 – Boyd	United Center (18,988); Chicago, IL
March 14, 2026; 12:00 p.m., CBS	(5) No. 23	vs. (1) No. 3 Michigan; Semifinal	L 65–68	24–10	18 – Rapp	6 – Tied	5 – Boyd	United Center (17,923); Chicago, IL
NCAA Tournament
March 19, 2026; 12:50 p.m., TBS	(5 W) No. 19	vs. (12 W) High Point; First round	L 82–83	24–11	27 – Boyd	10 – Blackwell	6 – Boyd	Moda Center (12,104); Portland, OR
*Non-conference game. ^{#}Rankings from AP Poll. (#) Tournament seedings in parentheses. W=West. All times are in Central Time.

== Rankings ==
Ranking movements Legend: ██ Increase in ranking ██ Decrease in ranking — = Not ranked RV = Received votes
	Week																				
Poll	Pre	1	2	3	4	5	6	7	8	9	10	11	12	13	14	15	16	17	18	19	Final
AP	24	24	23	RV	RV	RV	RV	—	—	—	RV	RV	RV	RV	—	24	RV	RV	23	19	25
Coaches	24	22	21	RV	RV	RV	RV	—	—	—	RV	RV	—	—	—	25	RV	RV	23	20	25

== Player statistics ==
Individual player statistics (final statistics)
			Minutes		Scoring		Total FGs			3-point FGs			Free throws			Rebounds								
Player	GP	GS	Tot	Avg	Pts	Avg	FG	FGA	Pct	3FG	3FA	Pct	FT	FTA	Pct	Off	Def	Tot	Avg	A	TO	Blk	Stl	PF
Boyd, Nick	35	35	1117	31.9	726	20.7	252	525	.480	61	167	.365	161	194	.830	27	106	133	3.8	149	59	1	36	68
Blackwell, John	34	34	1145	33.7	650	19.1	198	461	.430	96	247	.389	158	183	.863	41	131	172	5.1	79	57	3	38	84
Winter, Nolan	31	30	950	30.6	406	13.1	153	269	.569	31	95	.326	69	93	.742	70	192	262	8.5	48	25	38	15	60
Rapp, Austin	30	12	693	23.1	291	9.7	96	229	.419	58	160	.363	41	48	.854	32	87	119	4.0	47	25	15	14	58
Carrington, Braeden	34	0	616	18.1	281	8.3	84	206	.408	69	172	.401	44	57	.772	19	63	82	2.4	36	17	11	13	46
Rohde, Andrew	34	34	901	26.5	195	5.7	66	182	.363	42	132	.318	21	27	.778	19	52	71	2.1	98	37	7	42	77
Bieliauskas, Aleksas	35	28	707	20.2	171	4.9	62	144	.431	28	81	.346	19	30	.633	53	100	153	4.4	30	29	21	6	77
Janicki, Jack	26	1	430	16.5	58	2.2	21	65	.323	13	47	.277	3	5	.600	16	35	51	2.0	29	15	5	17	44
Jones, Hayden	27	1	194	7.2	45	1.7	16	26	.615	1	2	.500	12	22	.545	10	18	28	1.0	11	14	2	5	25
Kinziger, Zach	16	0	76	4.8	21	1.3	8	25	.320	4	16	.250	1	2	.500	0	4	4	0.2	9	1	0	5	12
Garlock, Will	30	0	205	6.8	32	1.1	13	18	.722	0	0	.---	6	16	.375	11	21	32	1.1	20	11	5	2	42
Robison, Jack	17	0	31	1.8	17	1.0	6	8	.750	3	4	.750	2	3	.750	1	7	8	0.5	1	4	1	2	2
Gard, Isaac	14	0	16	1.1	11	0.8	3	7	.429	3	6	.500	2	2	1.000	0	3	3	0.2	1	2	0	0	1
Greppi, Riccardo	14	0	19	1.4	0	0.0	0	6	.000	0	2	.000	0	2	.000	4	1	5	0.4	2	2	0	0	0
Total	35	-	7100	-	2904	83.0	978	2171	.450	409	1131	.362	539	684	.788	359	885	1244	35.5	560	314	109	195	596
Opponents	35	-	7100	-	2664	76.1	954	2141	.446	291	870	.334	465	639	.728	348	874	1222	34.9	485	349	130	161	606

Legend
GP	Games played	GS	Games started	Avg	Average per game
FG	Field-goals made	FGA	Field-goal attempts	Off	Offensive rebounds
Def	Defensive rebounds	A	Assists	TO	Turnovers
Blk	Blocks	Stl	Steals	High	Team high
