= 2024–25 Wisconsin Badgers men's basketball team =

American college basketball season

2024–25 Wisconsin Badgers men's basketball

Greenbrier Tip-Off Mountain champions

NCAA tournament, Second round
- Conference: Big Ten Conference

Ranking
- Coaches: No. 16
- AP: No. 16
- Record: 27–10 (13–7 Big Ten)
- Head coach: Greg Gard (10th season)
- Associate head coach: Joe Krabbenhoft (9th season)
- Assistant coaches: Sharif Chambliss (4th season); Lance Randall (1st season)
- Home arena: Kohl Center

2024–25 Big Ten Conference men's basketball standings
	Conf.				Overall
Team	W		L	PCT	W		L	PCT
No. 7 Michigan State	17	–	3	.850	30	–	7	.811
No. 9 Maryland	14	–	6	.700	27	–	9	.750
No. 10 Michigan †	14	–	6	.700	27	–	10	.730
UCLA	13	–	7	.650	23	–	11	.676
No. 16 Wisconsin	13	–	7	.650	27	–	10	.730
No. 14 Purdue	13	–	7	.650	24	–	12	.667
Illinois	12	–	8	.600	22	–	13	.629
Oregon	12	–	8	.600	25	–	10	.714
Indiana	10	–	10	.500	19	–	13	.594
Ohio State	9	–	11	.450	17	–	15	.531
Rutgers	8	–	12	.400	15	–	17	.469
Minnesota	7	–	13	.350	15	–	17	.469
Northwestern	7	–	13	.350	17	–	16	.515
USC	7	–	13	.350	17	–	18	.486
Iowa	7	–	13	.350	17	–	16	.515
Nebraska	7	–	13	.350	21	–	14	.600
Penn State	6	–	14	.300	16	–	15	.516
Washington	4	–	16	.200	13	–	18	.419
† 2025 Big Ten tournament winner Rankings from AP poll

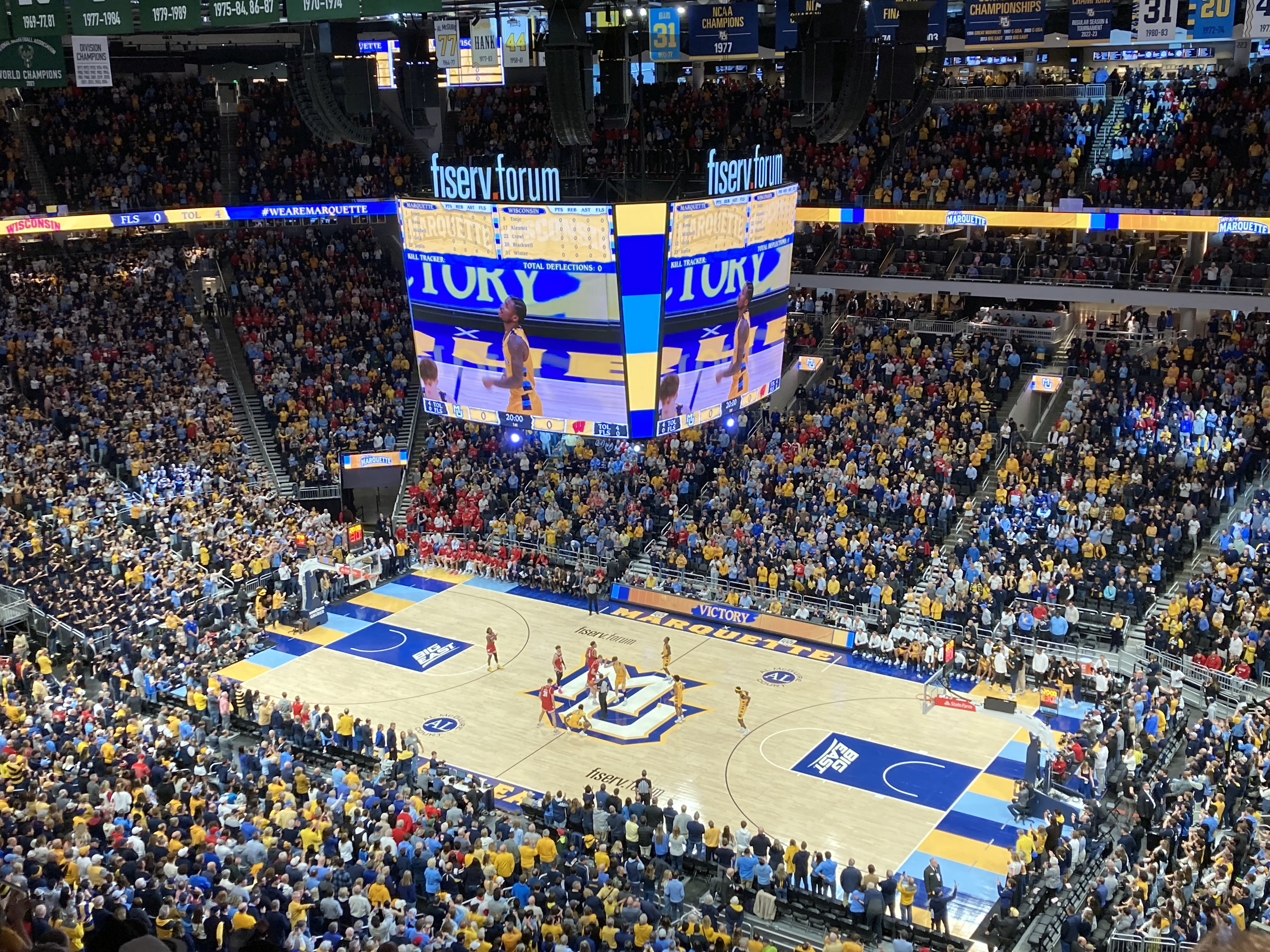
Opening tip of the game at Marquette

The 2024–25 Wisconsin Badgers men's basketball team represented the University of Wisconsin–Madison in the 2024–25 NCAA Division I men's basketball season. The Badgers were led by 10th-year head coach Greg Gard and played their home games at the Kohl Center in Madison, Wisconsin as members of the Big Ten Conference. They finished the season 27–10, 13–7 in Big Ten play to finish in a three-way tie for fourth place. As the No. 5 seed in the Big Ten tournament, they defeated Northwestern, UCLA, and Michigan State to advance to the tournament championship game where they lost to Michigan. They received an at-large bid to the NCAA tournament as the No. 3 seed in the East region. They defeated Montana in the first round before losing to BYU in the second round.

The Wisconsin Badgers drew an average home attendance of 15,006, the 12th-highest of all college basketball teams.

== Previous season ==
The Badgers finished the 2023–24 season 22–14, 11–9 in Big Ten play to finish in fifth place. They defeated Maryland, Northwestern, and Purdue to advance to the championship of the Big Ten tournament. There they lost to Illinois. They received an at-large bid to the NCAA tournament as the No. 5 seed in the South region. They were upset in the first round by James Madison.

== Offseason ==
=== Departures ===
All players listed as "graduated" are tentative departures unless otherwise noted.

Wisconsin departures
Name	Number	Pos.	Height	Weight	Year	Hometown	Reason for departure
Tyler Wahl	5	F	6'9"	225	Graduate Student	Lakeville, MN	Graduated
Connor Essegian	3	G	6'4"	195	Sophomore	Fort Wayne, IN	Transferred to Nebraska
AJ Storr	2	G	6'7"	205	Sophomore	Rockford, IL	Transferred to Kansas
Chucky Hepburn	23	G	6'2"	195	Junior	Omaha, NE	Transferred to Louisville
Gus Yalden	34	F	6'9"	245	Freshman	Appleton, WI	Transferred to Seton Hall
Luke Haertle	12	G	6'4"	215	RS Freshman	Hartland, WI	Transferred to Winona State
Isaac Lindsey	10	G	6'4"	185	RS Junior	Mineral Point, WI	Transferred to South Dakota State
Ross Candelino	30	G	6'5"	195	Sophomore	Jacksonville, FL	Transferred to Lipscomb

=== Incoming transfers ===
Wisconsin incoming transfers
Name	Number	Pos.	Height	Weight	Year	Hometown	Previous school
John Tonje	9	G	6'6"	215	Graduate Student	North Omaha, NE	Missouri
Xavier Amos	13	F	6'8"	215	Junior	Chicago, IL	Northern Illinois
Camren Hunter	3	G	6'3"	200	Junior	Bryant, AR	Central Arkansas

=== 2024 recruiting class ===
College recruiting
Name	Hometown	School	Height	Weight	Commit date
Daniel Freitag; G	Minneapolis, MN	Breck School	6 ft 2 in (1.88 m)	195 lb (88 kg)	Jun 2, 2023
Daniel Freitag; G	Recruit ratings: Scout: Rivals: 247Sports: (82)				
Jack Robison; G	Lakeville, MN	Lakeville North High School	6 ft 6 in (1.98 m)	190 lb (86 kg)	Oct 25, 2022
Jack Robison; G	Recruit ratings: Scout: Rivals: 247Sports: (81)				
Overall recruit ranking:
Note: In many cases, Scout, Rivals, 247Sports, On3, and ESPN may conflict in their listings of height and weight.; In these cases, the average was taken. ESPN grades are on a 100-point scale.; Sources: "2024 Wisconsin Commitments". Rivals.; "Men's Basketball Recruiting". Scout.; "ESPN- Wisconsin Badgers Men's Basketball Recruiting". ESPN.; "Scout.com Team Recruiting Rankings". Scout.; "2024 Team Ranking". Rivals.

== Roster ==
2024–25 Wisconsin Badgers men's basketball team
Players
Coaches

Pos.	#	Name	Height	Weight	Year	Previous school	Hometown
F	2	Jack Robison	6 ft 6 in (1.98 m)	190 lb (86 kg)	Fr	Lakeville North High School	Lakeville, Minnesota
G	3	Camren Hunter	6 ft 3 in (1.91 m)	200 lb (91 kg)	Jr	Bryant High School/Central Arkansas	Bryant, Arkansas
G	4	Kamari McGee	6 ft 0 in (1.83 m)	180 lb (82 kg)	Sr	St. Catherine's High School/Green Bay	Racine, Wisconsin
G	5	Daniel Freitag	6 ft 3 in (1.91 m)	195 lb (88 kg)	Fr	Breck School	Bloomington, Minnesota
F	7	Carter Gilmore	6 ft 7 in (2.01 m)	232 lb (105 kg)	GS	Arrowhead High School	Hartland, Wisconsin
G	9	John Tonje	6 ft 6 in (1.98 m)	215 lb (98 kg)	GS	Omaha Central High School/Colorado State/Missouri	North Omaha, Nebraska
G	11	Max Klesmit	6 ft 4 in (1.93 m)	200 lb (91 kg)	GS	Neenah High School/Wofford	Neenah, Wisconsin
F	13	Xavier Amos	6 ft 8 in (2.03 m)	215 lb (98 kg)	Jr	Whitney Young High School/Northern Illinois	Chicago, Illinois
G	14	Aidan Konop (W)	6 ft 2 in (1.88 m)	215 lb (98 kg)	Fr	Sussex Hamilton	Sussex, Wisconsin
G	15	Isaac Gard (W)	6 ft 2 in (1.88 m)	165 lb (75 kg)	Jr	Oregon High School	Oregon, Wisconsin
F	18	Riccardo Greppi	6 ft 10 in (2.08 m)	250 lb (113 kg)	Fr	Pallacanestro Cantù	Italy
F	21	Chris Hodges	6 ft 9 in (2.06 m)	250 lb (113 kg)	RS Jr	Schaumburg High School	Schaumburg, Illinois
F	22	Steven Crowl	7 ft 0 in (2.13 m)	247 lb (112 kg)	GS	Eastview High School	Eagan, Minnesota
G	25	John Blackwell	6 ft 4 in (1.93 m)	194 lb (88 kg)	So	Brother Rice High School	Bloomfield Hills, Michigan
F	31	Nolan Winter	6 ft 11 in (2.11 m)	220 lb (100 kg)	So	Lakeville North High School	Lakeville, Minnesota
G	33	Jack Janicki (W)	6 ft 5 in (1.96 m)	190 lb (86 kg)	RS Fr	White Bear Lake Area High School	White Bear Lake, Minnesota
F	35	Markus Ilver	6 ft 9 in (2.06 m)	225 lb (102 kg)	Sr	Western Reserve Academy	Tallinn, Estonia

Head coach

- Greg Gard (UW-Platteville)

Assistant coach(es)

- Joe Krabbenhoft (Wisconsin)
- Sharif Chambliss (Wisconsin)
- Lance Randall (Beloit)

Legend

- (C) Team captain
- (S) Suspended
- (I) Ineligible
- (W) Walk-on
- Injured
- Current redshirt

Roster

== Schedule and results ==
Date time, TV	Rank^{#}	Opponent^{#}	Result	Record	High points	High rebounds	High assists	Site (attendance) city, state
Exhibition
October 30, 2024*; 7:00 p.m., B1G+		UW–River Falls	W 78–62	–	15 – Tonje	7 – Winter	6 – McGee	Kohl Center (13,473); Madison, WI
Regular season
November 4, 2024*; 7:00 p.m., B1G+		Holy Cross	W 85–61	1–0	23 – Tonje	8 – Crowl	4 – McGee	Kohl Center (13,451); Madison, WI
November 7, 2024*; 7:00 p.m., B1G+		Montana State	W 79–67	2–0	26 – Klesmit	8 – Winter	4 – Crowl	Kohl Center (13,554); Madison, WI
November 10, 2024*; 11:00 a.m., B1G+		Appalachian State	W 87–56	3–0	17 – Tied	8 – Winter	5 – Tonje	Kohl Center (13,913); Madison, WI
November 15, 2024*; 8:00 p.m., Peacock		No. 9 Arizona	W 103–88	4–0	41 – Tonje	6 – Tonje	6 – Crowl	Kohl Center (16,838); Madison, WI
November 18, 2024*; 7:00 p.m., BTN	No. 19	UT-Rio Grande Valley; Greenbrier Tip-Off campus game	W 87–84	5–0	30 – Blackwell	7 – Blackwell	3 – Blackwell	Kohl Center (13,423); Madison, WI
November 22, 2024*; 4:00 p.m., CBSSN	No. 19	vs. UCF; Greenbrier Tip-Off Mountain Division Semifinals	W 86–70	6–0	17 – Blackwell	10 – Winter	4 – Tonje	Colonial Hall (1,112); White Sulphur Springs, WV
November 24, 2024*; 4:30 p.m., CBSSN	No. 19	vs. Pittsburgh; Greenbrier Tip-Off Mountain Division Championship	W 81–75	7–0	33 – Tonje	9 – Crowl	5 – Klesmit	Colonial Hall (1,112); White Sulphur Springs, WV
November 30, 2024*; 12:00 p.m., Peacock	No. 15	Chicago State	W 74–53	8–0	22 – Tonje	7 – Crowl	5 – Tied	Kohl Center (14,711); Madison, WI
December 3, 2024; 8:00 p.m., Peacock	No. 11	Michigan	L 64–67	8–1 (0–1)	18 – Tonje	9 – Blackwell	2 – Tied	Kohl Center (14,582); Madison, WI
December 7, 2024*; 12:30 p.m., FOX	No. 11	at No. 5 Marquette; Rivalry	L 74–88	8–2	22 – Klesmit	11 – Crowl	5 – Gilmore	Fiserv Forum (18,107); Milwaukee, WI
December 10, 2024; 8:00 p.m., Peacock	No. 20	at Illinois	L 80–86	8–3 (0–2)	15 – Winter	7 – Winter	4 – Klesmit	State Farm Center (15,544); Champaign, IL
December 14, 2024*; 1:30 p.m., BTN	No. 20	vs. Butler; Indy Classic	W 83–74	9–3	20 – Winter	8 – Winter	5 – Blackwell	Gainbridge Fieldhouse (15,045); Indianapolis, IN
December 22, 2024*; 1:00 p.m., BTN		Detroit Mercy	W 76–53	10–3	18 – Winter	11 – Winter	5 – Blackwell	Kohl Center (14,098); Madison, WI
January 3, 2025; 6:00 p.m., FS1		Iowa	W 116–85	11–3 (1–2)	32 – Blackwell	8 – Tied	6 – Klesmit	Kohl Center (16,838); Madison, WI
January 6, 2025; 6:00 p.m., FS1		at Rutgers	W 75–63	12–3 (2–2)	21 – Blackwell	10 – Crowl	3 – Tied	Jersey Mike's Arena (8,000); Piscataway, NJ
January 10, 2025; 6:00 p.m., Peacock		Minnesota	W 80–59	13–3 (3–2)	18 – Crowl	6 – Tied	3 – Tied	Kohl Center (14,239); Madison, WI
January 14, 2025; 8:00 p.m., Peacock	No. 24	Ohio State	W 70–68	14–3 (4–2)	17 – Tonje	7 – Crowl	2 – Blackwell	Kohl Center (14,527); Madison, WI
January 18, 2025; 2:00 p.m., BTN	No. 24	at USC	W 84–69	15–3 (5–2)	28 – Blackwell	5 – Tied	4 – Tied	Galen Center (6,938); Los Angeles, CA
January 21, 2025; 8:30 p.m., Peacock	No. 18	at UCLA	L 83–85	15–4 (5–3)	24 – Tonje	5 – Tied	4 – Blackwell	Pauley Pavilion (6,695); Los Angeles, CA
January 26, 2025; 12:00 p.m., BTN	No. 18	Nebraska	W 83–55	16–4 (6–3)	27 – Tonje	7 – Tied	4 – Amos	Kohl Center (16,838); Madison, WI
January 29, 2025; 6:00 p.m., BTN	No. 17	at Maryland	L 68–76	16–5 (6–4)	23 – Tonje	9 – Crowl	3 – Tied	Xfinity Center (17,950); College Park, MD
February 1, 2025; 1:00 p.m., FS1	No. 17	at Northwestern	W 75–69	17–5 (7–4)	27 – Tonje	7 – Tied	3 – Tied	Welsh–Ryan Arena (7,039); Evanston, IL
February 4, 2025; 8:00 p.m., Peacock	No. 21	Indiana	W 76–64	18–5 (8–4)	15 – Tonje	8 – Blackwell	6 – Klesmit	Kohl Center (14,447); Madison, WI
February 8, 2025; 12:00 p.m., NBC	No. 21	at Iowa	W 74–63	19–5 (9–4)	22 – Tonje	8 – Crowl	4 – Tonje	Carver–Hawkeye Arena (12,693); Iowa City, IA
February 15, 2025; 12:00 p.m., CBS	No. 16	at No. 7 Purdue	W 94–84	20–5 (10–4)	32 – Tonje	6 – Tonje	6 – Klesmit	Mackey Arena (14,876); West Lafayette, IN
February 18, 2025; 7:30 p.m., FS1	No. 11	Illinois	W 95–74	21–5 (11–4)	31 – Tonje	8 – Winter	5 – Crowl	Kohl Center (15,170); Madison, WI
February 22, 2025; 11:00 a.m., FOX	No. 11	Oregon	L 73–77 ^{OT}	21–6 (11–5)	22 – Tonje	7 – Tied	2 – Tied	Kohl Center (16,838); Madison, WI
February 25, 2025; 8:00 p.m., Peacock	No. 11	Washington	W 88–62	22–6 (12–5)	24 – Blackwell	10 – Blackwell	4 – Crowl	Kohl Center (14,804); Madison, WI
March 2, 2025; 12:30 p.m., CBS	No. 11	at No. 8 Michigan State	L 62–71	22–7 (12–6)	19 – Blackwell	17 – Winter	3 – Tied	Breslin Center (14,797); East Lansing, MI
March 5, 2025; 7:30 p.m., BTN	No. 12	at Minnesota	W 74–67	23–7 (13–6)	25 – Blackwell	11 – Blackwell	5 – McGee	Williams Arena (14,625); Minneapolis, MN
March 8, 2025; 12:00 p.m., Peacock	No. 12	Penn State	L 75–86	23–8 (13–7)	19 – Tied	7 – Tonje	3 – Tied	Kohl Center (16,838); Madison, WI
Big Ten Tournament
March 13, 2025; 1:30 p.m., BTN	(5) No. 18	vs. (13) Northwestern; Second round	W 70–63	24–8	18 – Tied	7 – Tied	3 – Crowl	Gainbridge Fieldhouse (13,216); Indianapolis, IN
March 14, 2025; 1:30 p.m., BTN	(5) No. 18	vs. (4) UCLA; Quarterfinal	W 86–70	25–8	26 – Tonje	9 – Tonje	4 – Tied	Gainbridge Fieldhouse (13,298); Indianapolis, IN
March 15, 2025; 12:00 p.m., CBS	(5) No. 18	vs. (1) No. 7 Michigan State; Semifinal	W 77–74	26–8	32 – Tonje	8 – Crowl	5 – Gilmore	Gainbridge Fieldhouse (13,612); Indianapolis, IN
March 16, 2025; 2:30 p.m., CBS	(5) No. 18	vs. (3) No. 22 Michigan; Championship	L 53–59	26–9	18 – Blackwell	7 – Tied	3 – Klesmit	Gainbridge Fieldhouse (13,824); Indianapolis, IN
NCAA Tournament
March 20, 2025; 12:30 p.m., TNT	(3 E) No. 13	vs. (14 E) Montana; First round	W 85–66	27–9	19 – Blackwell	6 – Tied	4 – Klesmit	Ball Arena (19,921); Denver, CO
March 22, 2025; 6:45 p.m., CBS	(3 E) No. 13	vs. (6 E) No. 17 BYU; Second round	L 89–91	27–10	37 – Tonje	6 – Blackwell	4 – Tonje	Ball Arena (19,386); Denver, CO
*Non-conference game. ^{#}Rankings from AP poll. (#) Tournament seedings in parentheses. E=East. All times are in Central Time.

== Rankings ==
Ranking movements Legend: ██ Increase in ranking ██ Decrease in ranking — = Not ranked RV = Received votes
	Week																				
Poll	Pre	1	2	3	4	5	6	7	8	9	10	11	12	13	14	15	16	17	18	19	Final
AP	RV	RV	19	15	11	20	RV	RV	RV	RV	24	18	17	21	16	11	11	12	18	13	16
Coaches	RV	—	25	17	11	22	RV	RV	—	RV	RV	19	17	19	15	11	12	12	14	10	16

== Player statistics ==
Individual player statistics (final statistics)
			Minutes		Scoring		Total FGs			3-point FGs			Free Throws			Rebounds								
Player	GP	GS	Tot	Avg	Pts	Avg	FG	FGA	Pct	3FG	3FA	Pct	FT	FTA	Pct	Off	Def	Tot	Avg	A	TO	Blk	Stl	PF
Tonje, John	37	37	1154	31.2	724	19.6	204	439	.465	85	219	.388	231	254	.909	29	166	195	5.3	67	68	8	27	63
Blackwell, John	37	37	1153	31.2	583	15.8	203	450	.451	58	180	.322	119	146	.815	38	152	190	5.1	81	77	2	32	94
Crowl, Steven	37	37	945	25.5	365	9.9	139	258	.539	32	77	.416	55	67	.821	52	144	196	5.3	90	52	17	18	76
Winter, Nolan	37	37	783	21.2	348	9.4	127	225	.564	34	95	.358	60	78	.769	64	152	216	5.8	39	28	15	15	58
Klesmit, Max	33	33	911	27.6	303	9.2	92	267	.345	53	183	.290	66	78	.846	8	70	78	2.4	89	37	2	26	55
McGee, Kamari	37	4	810	21.9	240	6.5	84	184	.457	39	85	.459	33	41	.805	21	79	100	2.7	68	25	2	33	79
Gilmore, Carter	37	0	704	19.0	146	3.9	52	111	.468	21	62	.339	21	29	.724	30	68	98	2.6	48	17	17	12	83
Amos, Xavier	37	0	35	9.6	131	3.5	46	123	.374	20	68	.294	19	27	.704	14	52	66	1.8	16	20	12	8	32
Janicki, Jack	37	0	423	11.4	70	1.9	27	69	.391	13	47	.277	3	9	.333	11	39	50	1.4	31	8	9	15	42
Ilver, Markus	20	0	67	3.4	31	1.6	10	28	.357	7	21	.333	4	4	1.000	2	8	10	0.5	1	4	2	2	10
Greppi, Riccardo	9	0	20	2.2	8	0.9	2	3	.667	0	1	.000	4	6	.667	4	6	10	1.1	1	2	1	0	3
Robison, Jack	13	0	17	1.3	6	0.5	2	4	.500	2	2	1.000	0	0	.---	2	2	4	0.3	1	0	0	0	1
Hunter, Camren	11	0	20	1.8	3	0.3	1	8	.125	1	4	.250	0	0	.–––	2	3	5	0.5	1	2	0	0	4
Gard, Isaac	13	0	15	1.2	3	0.2	1	1	1.000	1	1	1.000	0	0	.–––	0	2	2	0.2	1	0	0	0	1
Freitag, Daniel	14	0	27	1.9	2	0.1	1	11	.091	0	6	.000	0	3	.000	2	2	4	0.3	3	1	0	1	9
Hodges, Chris	15	0	17	1.1	1	0.1	0	3	.000	0	1	.000	1	4	.250	0	0	0	0.0	0	1	0	1	1
Konop, Aidan	4	0	4	1.0	0	0.0	0	0	.---	0	0	.–––	0	0	.---	0	0	0	0.0	0	0	0	0	0
Total	37	-	7425	-	2964	80.1	991	2184	.454	366	1052	.348	616	746	.826	347	1003	1350	36.5	537	356	87	190	611
Opponents	37	-	7425	-	2622	70.9	937	2252	.416	293	880	.333	455	624	.729	366	893	1259	34.0	468	369	121	176	685

Legend
GP	Games played	GS	Games started	Avg	Average per game
FG	Field-goals made	FGA	Field-goal attempts	Off	Offensive rebounds
Def	Defensive rebounds	A	Assists	TO	Turnovers
Blk	Blocks	Stl	Steals	High	Team high
