= Nolan Winter =

American basketball player (born 2005)

- Winter with the Wisconsin Badgers in 2026

No. 31 – Wisconsin Badgers
- Position: Power forward / center
- League: Big Ten Conference

Personal information
- Born: November 13, 2005 (age 21)
- Listed height: 7 ft 0 in (2.13 m)
- Listed weight: 235 lb (107 kg)

Career information
- High school: Lakeville North (Lakeville, Minnesota)
- College: Wisconsin (2023–present)

Nolan Winter (born November 13, 2005) is an American college basketball player for the Wisconsin Badgers of the Big Ten Conference.

== High school career ==
Winter attended Lakeville North in Lakeville, Minnesota. During his junior season, Winter averaged 17.8 points (49.8% FG) and 8.3 rebounds. As a senior, Winter averaged 23.4 points and 11.6 rebounds per game, which helped guide Lakeville North to a record of 28–4 and a trip to the 2023 Class 4A state tournament semifinals. Following the season, Winter was named as the Minnesota Gatorade Boys Basketball Player of the Year along with being one of five finalists for Minnesota Mr. Basketball.

=== Recruiting ===
Winter received nine NCAA Division I offers. He chose Wisconsin over offers from his parents' alma mater Minnesota, as well as those from Stanford, Wake Forest, Xavier and Oregon State.

College recruiting
Name	Hometown	School	Height	Weight	Commit date
Nolan Winter; PF	Lakeville, MN	Lakeville North High School	6 ft 10 in (2.08 m)	190 lb (86 kg)	Sep 23, 2022
Nolan Winter; PF	Recruit ratings: Scout: Rivals: 247Sports: (80)				
Overall recruit ranking:
Note: In many cases, Scout, Rivals, 247Sports, On3, and ESPN may conflict in their listings of height and weight.; In these cases, the average was taken. ESPN grades are on a 100-point scale.; Sources: "2023 Wisconsin Commitments". Rivals.; "Men's Basketball Recruiting". Scout.; "ESPN- Wisconsin Badgers Men's Basketball Recruiting". ESPN.; "Scout.com Team Recruiting Rankings". Scout.; "2023 Team Ranking". Rivals.

== College career ==
=== Freshman season ===
In his debut, Winter led the team with seven rebounds in a 105–76 win Arkansas State. Winter served as the primary backup to established starters Tyler Wahl and Steven Crowl, playing in all 36 of the Badgers' games in sparring minutes off the bench. Overall, Winter finished the season averaging 2.4 points and 1.3 rebounds in 9.4 games as a true freshman.

=== Sophomore season ===
Winter saw an increased role, starting in all 37 of the Badgers' games as the Power Forward next to Crowl. He recorded his first career double-double in the Badgers' 86–70 win over UCF in the semifinals of the Greenbrier Tip-Off, the first of three he would go on to record that season. In a span of two games, Winter led the team in scoring twice, with 20 points in an 83–74 victory over Butler in the Indy Classic and with an 18-point, 11-rebound double-double in an 76–53 win over Detroit Mercy. Winter finished the season averaging 9.4 points while leading the team 5.8 rebounds in 21.1 minutes per game. Additionally, Winter led the Big Ten in 2-point shooting percentage at 71.5%.

=== Junior season ===
Winter recorded a career high 26 points with 12 rebounds on February 7, 2026 in a controversial 78–77 overtime loss to Indiana. On March 4, in a game against Maryland, Winter suffered an ankle injury that kept him out of the Big Ten tournament. He finished the season averaging 13.1 points, 8.5 rebounds and 1.2 blocks in 30.7 minutes per game. Following the season, Winter underwent surgery for his ankle.

=== Senior season ===
On April 21, 2026, Winter announced he would return to the Badgers for his senior season.

== Career statistics ==
Legend
GP	Games played	GS	Games started	MPG	Minutes per game
FG%	Field goal percentage	3P%	3-point field goal percentage	FT%	Free throw percentage
RPG	Rebounds per game	APG	Assists per game	SPG	Steals per game
BPG	Blocks per game	PPG	Points per game	**Bold**	Career high

=== College ===
Year	Team	GP	GS	MPG	FG%	3P%	FT%	RPG	APG	SPG	BPG	PPG
2023–24	Wisconsin	36	0	9.4	.423	.308	.696	1.8	0.3	0.2	0.0	2.4
2024–25	Wisconsin	**37**	**37**	21.1	.564	**.358**	**.769**	5.8	1.1	0.4	0.4	9.4
2025–26	Wisconsin	31	30	**30.7**	**.569**	.326	.742	**8.5**	**1.5**	**0.5**	**1.2**	**13.1**
Career		104	67	19.9	.549	.336	.747	5.2	1.0	0.4	0.5	8.1

== Personal life ==
Both of Winter's parents, Trevor and Heidi, played for the Minnesota Golden Gophers. His father played for the Golden Gophers for four seasons, most notably on the 1996-97 season that made the Final Four, and played just one game in the NBA for the Minnesota Timberwolves. His mother played volleyball for the Golden Gophers.
