= Max Klesmit =

American basketball player (born 2002)

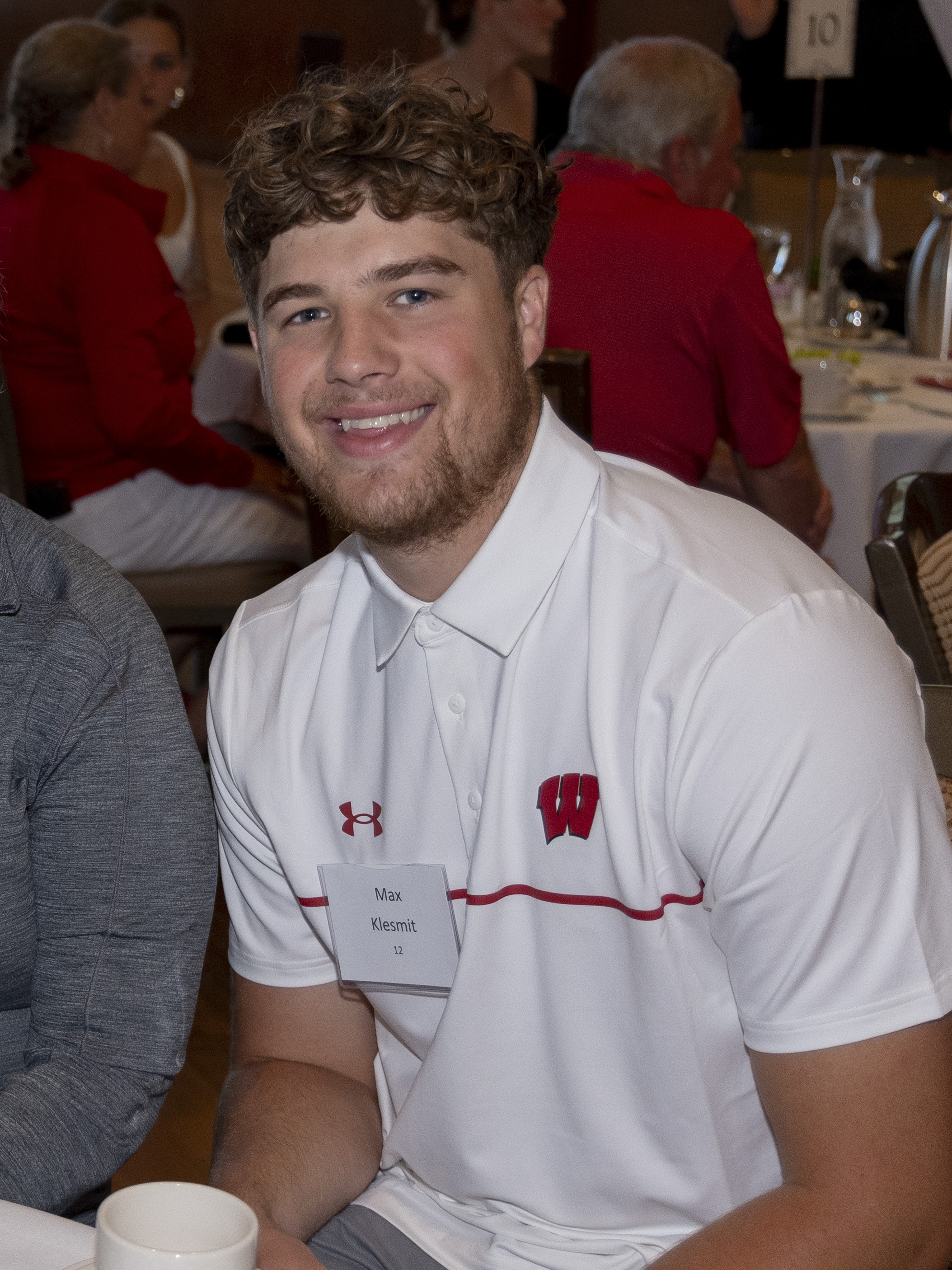
- Klesmit in 2024

No. 11 – Kangoeroes Basket Mechelen
- Position: Shooting guard
- League: BNXT League

Personal information
- Born: June 9, 2002 (age 24) Neenah, Wisconsin, U.S.
- Listed height: 6 ft 4 in (1.93 m)
- Listed weight: 200 lb (91 kg)

Career information
- High school: Neenah (Neenah, Wisconsin)
- College: Wofford (2020–2022); Wisconsin (2022–2025)
- NBA draft: 2025: undrafted
- Playing career: 2025–present

Career history
- 2025–2026: Salt Lake City Stars
- 2026–present: Kangoeroes Basket Mechelen

Career highlights
- Third-team All-SoCon (2022); SoCon All-Freshman team - Media (2021)

Max Klesmit (born June 9, 2002) is an American professional basketball player for Kangoeroes Basket Mechelen of the BNXT League. He played college basketball for the Wofford Terriers and Wisconsin Badgers.

== Early life and high school career ==
Klesmit was born and raised in Neenah, Wisconsin and played at Neenah High School. Klesmit was nominated for USA Today Network Player of the Year as a junior after leading the Fox Valley Association conference in points per game (25.5) and assists (4.8). During his senior season, he helped lead the Rockets to a 23–2 record and reached the sectional final. He led the team scoring 25.5 points per game and 7.8 rebounds per game his senior season. Klesmit was named to the Wisconsin All-State teams following his sophomore, junior and senior seasons.

College recruiting
Name	Hometown	School	Height	Weight	Commit date
Max Klesmit; SG	Neenah, WI	Neenah High School (WI)	6 ft 3 in (1.91 m)	170 lb (77 kg)	Aug 4, 2019
Max Klesmit; SG	Recruit ratings: No ratings found				
Overall recruit ranking:
Note: In many cases, Scout, Rivals, 247Sports, On3, and ESPN may conflict in their listings of height and weight.; In these cases, the average was taken. ESPN grades are on a 100-point scale.; Sources: "2020 Team Ranking". Rivals.

== College career ==
=== Wofford ===
After not being highly recruited and mostly receiving Division II offers, Klesmit did receive a few Division I offers from UW–Green Bay, UW–Milwaukee, North Dakota and Wofford.

==== Freshman season ====
Klesmit appeared in 19 games with two starts as a true freshman at Wofford College. He was named to the SoCon All–Freshman Team (media) after averaging 8.2 points and 2.7 rebounds in 22.7 minutes per game. Max scored a season high 15 points in a loss to Chattanooga on February 10, 2021.

==== Sophomore season ====
Klesmit started in all 31 games during his sophomore season at Wofford. He was named to the third team SoCon All–Conference after averaging 14.9 points, 2.8 rebounds, 1.9 assists and 1.6 steals in 31.8 minutes per game. Max scored a season high 27 points twice in a loss at South Carolina on February 23, 2021, and a victory against The Citadel on January 19, 2022. Following the season, Klesmit entered the NCAA transfer portal.

=== Wisconsin ===
==== Junior season ====
After announcing he was entering the transfer portal, Klesmit posted that his top 4 teams were Vanderbilt, Clemson, South Carolina and Colorado State. Despite not being in Klesmit's top 4, the Badgers were able to reengage the in-state product, and in the end, the hometown team won out. Klesmit was able to fill a role after Wisconsin lost guards Brad Davison (graduated) and Johnny Davis was drafted in the first round of the 2022 NBA draft. Klesmit was inserted into the starting lineup for day 1. During a game against Penn State, Klesmit took an inadvertent elbow to his face from Kanya Clary causing Max to get 16 stitches in his lip and cheek. He would be forced to miss the next two games. Klesmit finished the season as the Badgers fifth leading scorer with 8.4 points per game and scored a season high of 19 points twice against Michigan and Purdue in back to back games.

==== Senior season ====
Klesmit is known as the Badgers defensive leader. He is usually tasked with guarding opposing teams top scorers. During parts of his second season with the Badgers, Max has been the go to player when the Badgers need to score. A perfect example of this is when Klesmit scored 20 consecutive points and put up a career high 26 points against Indiana in a 91–79 victory.

==== Graduate season ====
Klesmit returned for his 5th season using the COVID eligibility. He struggled with his shot and injuries throughout the season but continued to be a major contributor on the defensive end.

== Professional career ==
After going undrafted during the 2025 NBA Draft, Klesmit made the opening day roster for the NBA G League Salt Lake City Stars with former Wisconsin Badgers teammates John Tonje and Steven Crowl.

On July 3, 2026, he signed with Kangoeroes Basket Mechelen of the BNXT League.

== Career statistics ==
Legend
GP	Games played	GS	Games started	MPG	Minutes per game
FG%	Field goal percentage	3P%	3-point field goal percentage	FT%	Free throw percentage
RPG	Rebounds per game	APG	Assists per game	SPG	Steals per game
BPG	Blocks per game	PPG	Points per game	**Bold**	Career high

=== College ===
Year	Team	GP	GS	MPG	FG%	3P%	FT%	RPG	APG	SPG	BPG	PPG
2020–21	Wofford	19	2	22.6	**.466**	.373	**.846**	2.7	1.2	1.3	0.0	8.2
2021–22	Wofford	31	31	30.9	.446	.340	.837	**2.8**	**1.9**	**1.6**	0.1	**14.9**
2022–23	Wisconsin	33	33	**32.1**	.423	.383	.696	2.7	1.4	1.2	**0.2**	8.4
2023–24	Wisconsin	**36**	**36**	28.7	.437	**.398**	.824	2.1	1.9	0.9	0.1	9.9
2024–25	Wisconsin	33	33	27.6	.345	.290	.846	2.4	**2.7**	0.8	0.1	9.2
Career		152	135	29.1	.420	.351	.808	2.5	1.9	1.1	0.1	10.2

== Personal life ==
Klesmit's parents are Rich and Kelly Klesmit. He has a younger brother, Cal, who plays college basketball at NCAA Division II Northern Michigan. His younger sister, Rowan, plays high school basketball for Neenah Rockets.
