= Trevor Winter =

American basketball player (born 1974)

Personal information
- Born: January 7, 1974 (age 52) Slayton, Minnesota, U.S.
- Listed height: 7 ft 0 in (2.13 m)
- Listed weight: 275 lb (125 kg)

Career information
- High school: Slayton (Slayton, Minnesota)
- College: Minnesota (1993–1997)
- NBA draft: 1997: undrafted
- Playing career: 1997–2001
- Position: Center
- Number: 50

Career history
- 1998–1999: Fargo-Moorhead Beez
- 1999: Minnesota Timberwolves
- 1999–2001: La Crosse Bobcats

Career NBA statistics
- Minutes: 5
- Rebounds: 3
- Personal fouls: 5
- Stats at NBA.com
- Stats at Basketball Reference

Trevor Nolan Winter (born January 7, 1974) is an American former professional basketball player who played briefly in the National Basketball Association (NBA).

The 7'0" center from the University of Minnesota played just one game in the NBA. In the lockout-shortened 1999 NBA season for the Minnesota Timberwolves, in five minutes of action against the L.A. Lakers, Winter grabbed three rebounds and committed five fouls (mostly on dominant center Shaquille O'Neal), making him one of three players in NBA history to have as many fouls as career minutes played. Prior to his short NBA career he played in the International Basketball Association for the Fargo-Moorhead Beez. His son Nolan played at Lakeville North High School and currently is a collegiate basketball player for Wisconsin Badgers men’s basketball.

== Career statistics ==
Legend
GP	Games played	GS	Games started	MPG	Minutes per game
FG%	Field goal percentage	3P%	3-point field goal percentage	FT%	Free throw percentage
RPG	Rebounds per game	APG	Assists per game	SPG	Steals per game
BPG	Blocks per game	PPG	Points per game	**Bold**	Career high

=== NBA ===
==== Regular season ====
Year	Team	GP	GS	MPG	FG%	3P%	FT%	RPG	APG	SPG	BPG	PPG
1998–99	Minnesota	1	0	5.0	–	–	–	3.0	.0	.0	.0	.0
