= Tracy Webster =

American basketball player and coach

Biographical details
- Born: April 7, 1971 (age 55); Harvey, Illinois, U.S.

Playing career
- 1991–1994: Wisconsin
- Position: Guard

Coaching career (HC unless noted)
- 2000–2001: Wisconsin–Parkside (assistant)
- 2001–2003: Ball State (assistant)
- 2003–2004: Purdue (assistant)
- 2004–2007: Illinois (assistant)
- 2007–2009: Kentucky (assistant)
- 2009–2010: DePaul (assistant)
- 2010: DePaul (interim HC)
- 2010–2011: Nebraska (assistant)
- 2011–2014: Tennessee (assistant)
- 2014–2017: California (assistant)

Head coaching record
- Overall: 1–15

Tracy Webster (born April 7, 1971) is an American former basketball coach. Webster worked as an assistant coach at Kentucky, Illinois, Purdue, Ball State, DePaul, Nebraska, Tennessee, and Cal. He was the interim head coach at DePaul from January 11, 2010, until April 7, 2010, amassing a 1–14 regular season record and a 0–1 record in the Big East tournament.

Webster was a basketball letterman and team captain at the University of Wisconsin–Madison, where, in 1994, he helped lead the Badgers to their first NCAA tournament appearance in over 40 years. He picked up All-Big Ten honors three times and his 179 assists in 1992–93 are a Wisconsin single-season record. In 1991–92, he set the school season mark with a .490 three-point percentage.

Webster is a 1990 graduate of Thornton Township High School in Harvey, Illinois.
