= Chucky Hepburn =

American basketball player (born 2003)

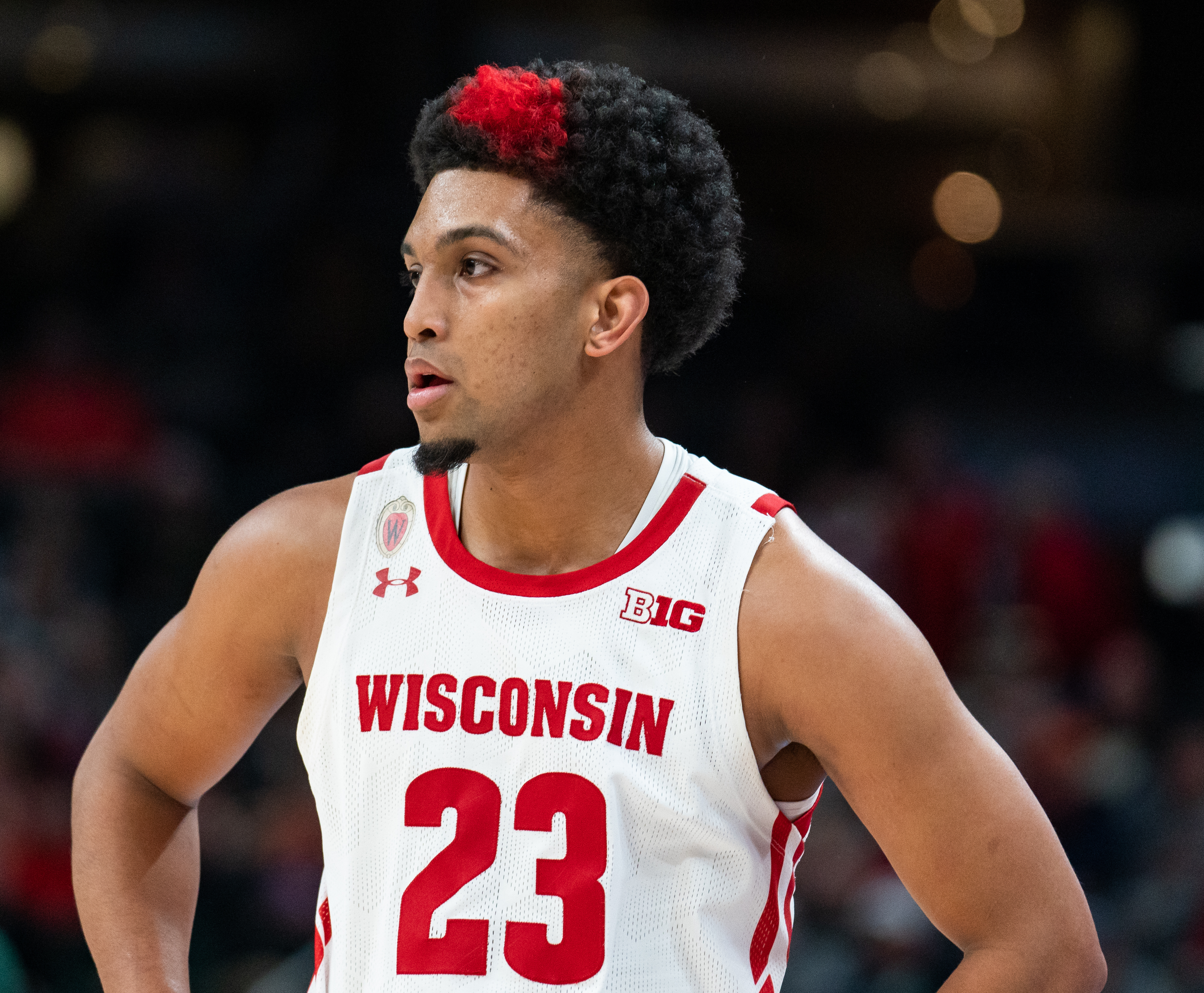
- Hepburn with Wisconsin in 2022

No. 24 – Raptors 905
- Position: Point guard
- League: NBA G League

Personal information
- Born: February 9, 2003 (age 23) Omaha, Nebraska, U.S.
- Listed height: 6 ft 0 in (1.83 m)
- Listed weight: 190 lb (86 kg)

Career information
- High school: Bellevue West (Bellevue, Nebraska)
- College: Wisconsin (2021–2024); Louisville (2024–2025)
- NBA draft: 2025: undrafted
- Playing career: 2025–present

Career history
- 2025–2026: Toronto Raptors
- 2025–2026: →Raptors 905
- 2026–present: Raptors 905

Career highlights
- ACC Defensive Player of the Year (2025); First-team All-ACC (2025); Big Ten All-Defensive Team (2024); Big Ten All-Freshman Team (2022)
- Stats at NBA.com
- Stats at Basketball Reference

Gabriel Malik "Chucky" Hepburn (born February 9, 2003) is an American professional basketball player for the Raptors 905 of the NBA G League. He played college basketball for the Wisconsin Badgers and the Louisville Cardinals.

== Early life and high school career ==
Hepburn grew up in Omaha, Nebraska, and attended Bellevue West High School. As a sophomore, Hepburn averaged 18.3 points, five assists, 5.1 rebounds, and 3.4 steals per game. Hepburn won the 2020 Nebraska Mr. Basketball Gatorade Player of the Year. He guided Bellevue West to a Class A state title as a junior, averaging 17.1 points, 6.5 assists, 4.6 rebounds, and 3.1 steals per game. He averaged 15.9 points, 8.3 assists, 5.1 rebounds, and 3.8 steals per game as a senior as Bellevue West appeared in the Class A state title.

=== Recruiting ===
College recruiting
| Name | Hometown | School | Height | Weight | Commit date |
|---|---|---|---|---|---|
| Chucky Hepburn; PG | Omaha, NE | Bellevue West (NE) | 6 ft 1 in (1.85 m) | 185 lb (84 kg) | Sep 29, 2019 |
| Chucky Hepburn; PG | Recruit ratings: Rivals: 247Sports: On3: ESPN: (81) | | | | |
Overall recruit ranking: Rivals: 123 247Sports: 114 ESPN: —
Note: In many cases, Scout, Rivals, 247Sports, On3, and ESPN may conflict in their listings of height and weight.; In these cases, the average was taken. ESPN grades are on a 100-point scale.; Sources: "Wisconsin 2021 Basketball Commitments". Rivals.; "2021 Wisconsin Badgers Recruiting Class". ESPN.; "2021 Team Ranking". Rivals.

== College career ==
=== Wisconsin ===
Hepburn enrolled at University of Wisconsin–Madison after receiving offers from Nebraska, Creighton, Minnesota, Loyola (IL) and Valparaiso.

==== Freshman season ====
Hepburn became the first true freshman to start the season opener since Devin Harris in 2001. He went on to score 13 points in his first career game against St. Francis. Hepburn banked in a tiebreaking 3-pointer with 1.5 seconds left against #8 ranked Purdue, giving the Badgers a share of the Big Ten regular-season title. Hepburn was able to profit in the newly implemented NIL after the game-winning shot against Purdue with merchandise named "The Chucky Special". After the regular season, Hepburn was named to the Big Ten All–Freshman Team.

==== Sophomore season ====
Hepburn was asked to take on a larger role in his second season at Wisconsin after Johnny Davis was selected 10th overall by the Washington Wizards. Hepburn started all 35 games and was the Badgers' leading scorer (12.2 points per game), 3-point percentage (.405), assists (2.8 APG), and steals (1.5 SPG). The team struggled with injuries midway through the season, and Wisconsin missed the NCAA tournament. Following the conclusion of the regular season, Hepburn was named an All–Big Ten honorable mention selection. The Badgers accepted an invitation to the NIT where Hepburn scored a career-high 27 points in a second round victory against Liberty.

==== Junior season ====
Hepburn came into his junior season and has thrived in the role of facilitator and defender. The previous season, he was looked at by his teammates as the "go to guy" to score late in shot clock or late in games. With the additions of scorers AJ Storr and freshman John Blackwell, Hepburn has been able to refine other parts of his game. Evidence of this is Chucky has put up his best assist to turnover ratio of his career and uptick in steals. Following the completion of the regular season, Hepburn was named All-Big Ten honorable mention by the coaches and named to the All-Defensive Team.

=== Louisville ===
==== Senior season ====
On April 25, 2024, Hepburn announced he would be transferring to Louisville. Hepburn scored a career high 37 points against Pittsburgh on March 1, 2025. He was named ACC player of the week for the second time during the 2024–25 season. Hepburn averaged 16.4 points, 5.8 assists and 2.4 steals per game. He was named ACC Defensive Player of the Year.

== Professional career ==
On July 1, 2025, after going undrafted in the 2025 NBA draft, Hepburn signed a two-way contract with the Toronto Raptors. On January 8, 2026, Hepburn was ruled out for at least six weeks after undergoing surgery to repair a torn meniscus in his right knee. He was waived by the Raptors on October 12, 2026 and later added to the Raptors 905 roster.

== Career statistics ==
Legend
| GP | Games played | GS | Games started | MPG | Minutes per game |
| FG% | Field goal percentage | 3P% | 3-point field goal percentage | FT% | Free throw percentage |
| RPG | Rebounds per game | APG | Assists per game | SPG | Steals per game |
| BPG | Blocks per game | PPG | Points per game | **Bold** | Career high |

=== NBA ===
| Year | Team | GP | GS | MPG | FG% | 3P% | FT% | RPG | APG | SPG | BPG | PPG |
|---|---|---|---|---|---|---|---|---|---|---|---|---|
| 2025–26 | Toronto | 2 | 0 | 6.5 | .000 | .000 | – | .5 | 1.0 | .5 | .0 | .0 |
| Career | | 2 | 0 | 6.5 | .000 | .000 | – | .5 | 1.0 | .5 | .0 | .0 |

=== College ===
| Year | Team | GP | GS | MPG | FG% | 3P% | FT% | RPG | APG | SPG | BPG | PPG |
|---|---|---|---|---|---|---|---|---|---|---|---|---|
| 2021–22 | Wisconsin | 33 | 33 | 31.0 | .388 | .348 | .696 | 2.1 | 2.3 | 1.1 | **.2** | 7.9 |
| 2022–23 | Wisconsin | **35** | **35** | 32.1 | .377 | **.405** | .718 | 2.8 | 2.8 | 1.5 | .1 | 12.2 |
| 2023–24 | Wisconsin | **35** | **35** | 33.3 | .429 | .322 | .737 | 3.3 | 3.9 | 2.1 | .1 | 9.2 |
| 2024–25 | Louisville | 34 | 34 | **34.8** | **.432** | .328 | **.844** | **3.5** | **5.8** | **2.4** | .1 | **16.4** |
| Career | | 137 | 137 | 32.8 | .406 | .353 | .779 | 2.9 | 3.7 | 1.8 | .1 | 11.5 |

== See also ==
- List of All-Atlantic Coast Conference men's basketball teams
