= Steven Crowl =

American basketball player (born 2001)

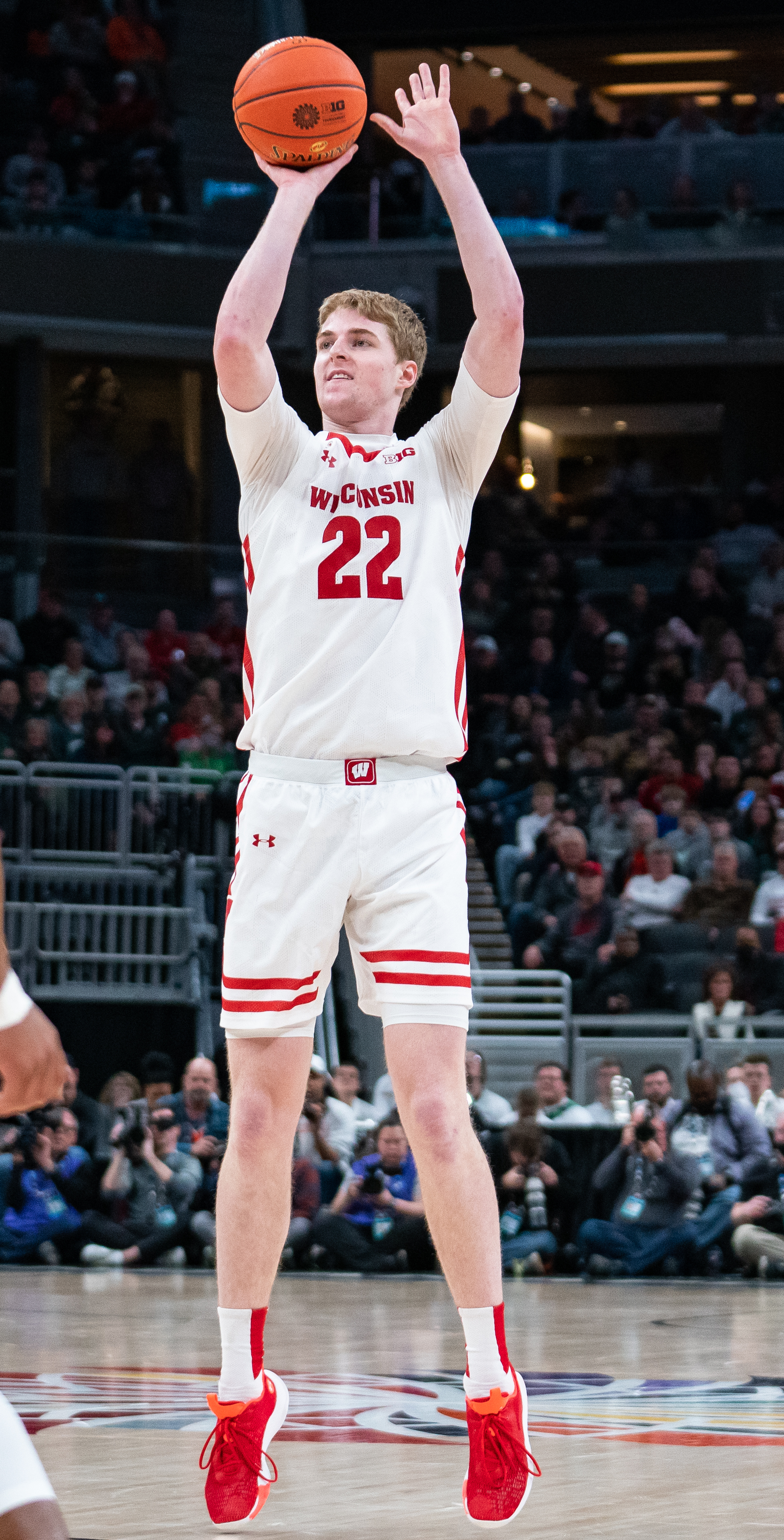

No. 22 – Grand Rapids Gold
- Position: Power forward / center
- League: NBA G League

Personal information
- Born: July 1, 2001 (age 25) Eagan, Minnesota, U.S.
- Listed height: 7 ft 0 in (2.13 m)
- Listed weight: 247 lb (112 kg)

Career information
- High school: Eastview (Apple Valley, Minnesota)
- College: Wisconsin (2020–2025)
- NBA draft: 2025: undrafted
- Playing career: 2025–present

Career history
- 2025–2026: Salt Lake City Stars
- 2026–present: Grand Rapids Gold
- Stats at NBA.com
- Stats at Basketball Reference

Steven Garrett Crowl (born July 1, 2001) is an American basketball player for the Grand Rapids Gold of the NBA G League. He played college basketball for the Wisconsin Badgers.

== Early life and high school career ==
Crowl was born and raised in Eagan, Minnesota and played at Eastview High School. During his junior season, Crowl led Eastview to the Minnesota 4A state tournament while averaging 19.7 points (39% 3FG), 8.1 rebounds and 1.6 blocks per game. As a senior, he led the team and averaged 26.7 points and 12 rebounds per game, while also leading the team in assists (4.3 per game). Crowl finished his career as Eastview's all-time leading scorer (1,747), rebounder (832) and shot blocker (103). Crowl was also a finalist for Minnesota Mr. Basketball.

=== Recruiting ===
Crowl committed to play college basketball at Wisconsin over offers from Minnesota, Iowa, Colorado, Northern Iowa, and South Dakota.

College recruiting
Name	Hometown	School	Height	Weight	Commit date
Steven Crowl; C	Eagan, MN	Eastview High School (MN)	6 ft 9 in (2.06 m)	210 lb (95 kg)	Sep 17, 2019
Steven Crowl; C	Recruit ratings: Scout: Rivals: 247Sports: ESPN: (75)				
Overall recruit ranking: Rivals: 145
Note: In many cases, Scout, Rivals, 247Sports, On3, and ESPN may conflict in their listings of height and weight.; In these cases, the average was taken. ESPN grades are on a 100-point scale.; Sources: "2020 Wisconsin Commitments". Rivals.; "Men's Basketball Recruiting". Scout.; "ESPN- Wisconsin Badgers Men's Basketball Recruiting". ESPN.; "Scout.com Team Recruiting Rankings". Scout.; "2020 Team Ranking". Rivals.

== College career ==
=== Redshirt freshman season ===
Crowl came in as a freshman with the labeled as a "modern big" who can shoot from all levels. He played sparingly as a freshman, appearing in 12 games and scoring 8 points total for the season.

=== Sophomore season ===
As a sophomore, Crowl started all 33 games and was the team's fourth-leading scorer with 8.8 points per game while adding 4.4 rebounds and 1.5 assists per game. He scored a season-high 21 points during a victory against Illinois State on December 29, 2021.

=== Junior season ===
Crowl moved into a bigger role during his junior season. He improved in all aspects of his game while including being the Badgers second leading scorer for the Badgers with 12.1 points per game while shooting 51 percent from the field and led the team with 6.9 rebounds per game. Crowl also lead the team in assists (243) and blocks (17). Crowl had a career game against Bradley during the first round of the NIT. He scored a career-best 36 points while adding nine rebounds and two blocks. Crowl's 36 points tied a program mark for most points in a postseason game, which was previously set by Michael Finley against Missouri in the second round of the 1994 NCAA Tournament.

=== Senior season ===
Crowl returned for his 4th year at Wisconsin. Crowl showed improvement in all shooting categories including field goal, three-point and free throw percentages during the season. Crowl finished the season as the second leading scorer and leading rebounder for the Badgers

=== Graduate season ===
Crowl was one of three Badgers who decided to utilize their COVID year of eligibility to play an extra season, the others being Max Klesmit and Carter Gilmore.

== Professional career ==
After going undrafted during the 2025 NBA Draft, Crowl was signed by the Utah Jazz. Crowl played in two Summer League games with the Jazz and was waived. Crowl then made the opening day roster for the NBA G League Salt Lake City Stars with former Wisconsin Badgers teammates John Tonje and Max Klesmit.

Crowl joined the Detroit Pistons for 2026 NBA Summer League play. His rights were traded from the Salt Lake City Stars to the Grand Rapids Gold.

== Career statistics ==
Legend
GP	Games played	GS	Games started	MPG	Minutes per game
FG%	Field goal percentage	3P%	3-point field goal percentage	FT%	Free throw percentage
RPG	Rebounds per game	APG	Assists per game	SPG	Steals per game
BPG	Blocks per game	PPG	Points per game	**Bold**	Career high

=== College ===
Year	Team	GP	GS	MPG	FG%	3P%	FT%	RPG	APG	SPG	BPG	PPG
2020–21	Wisconsin	12	0	3.0	.500	.000	.—	0.8	0.2	0.0	0.1	0.7
2021–22	Wisconsin	33	33	25.4	.496	.317	.800	4.4	1.5	0.3	0.3	8.8
2022–23	Wisconsin	35	35	**30.6**	.510	.307	.634	6.9	**2.5**	0.3	**0.5**	**12.1**
2023–24	Wisconsin	36	36	29.0	**.556**	**.448**	.742	**7.3**	2.1	0.3	**0.5**	11.2
2024–25	Wisconsin	**37**	**37**	25.6	.539	.416	**.821**	5.3	2.4	**0.5**	**0.5**	9.9
Career		153	141	25.7	.525	.363	.739	5.6	2.0	0.3	0.4	9.7

== Personal life ==
Crowl's parents are Stephanie and Jeff Crowl. His younger sister, Lauren, plays volleyball for the nationally ranked Minnesota Golden Gophers.
