= AJ Storr =

Bahmaian-American basketball player (born 2003)

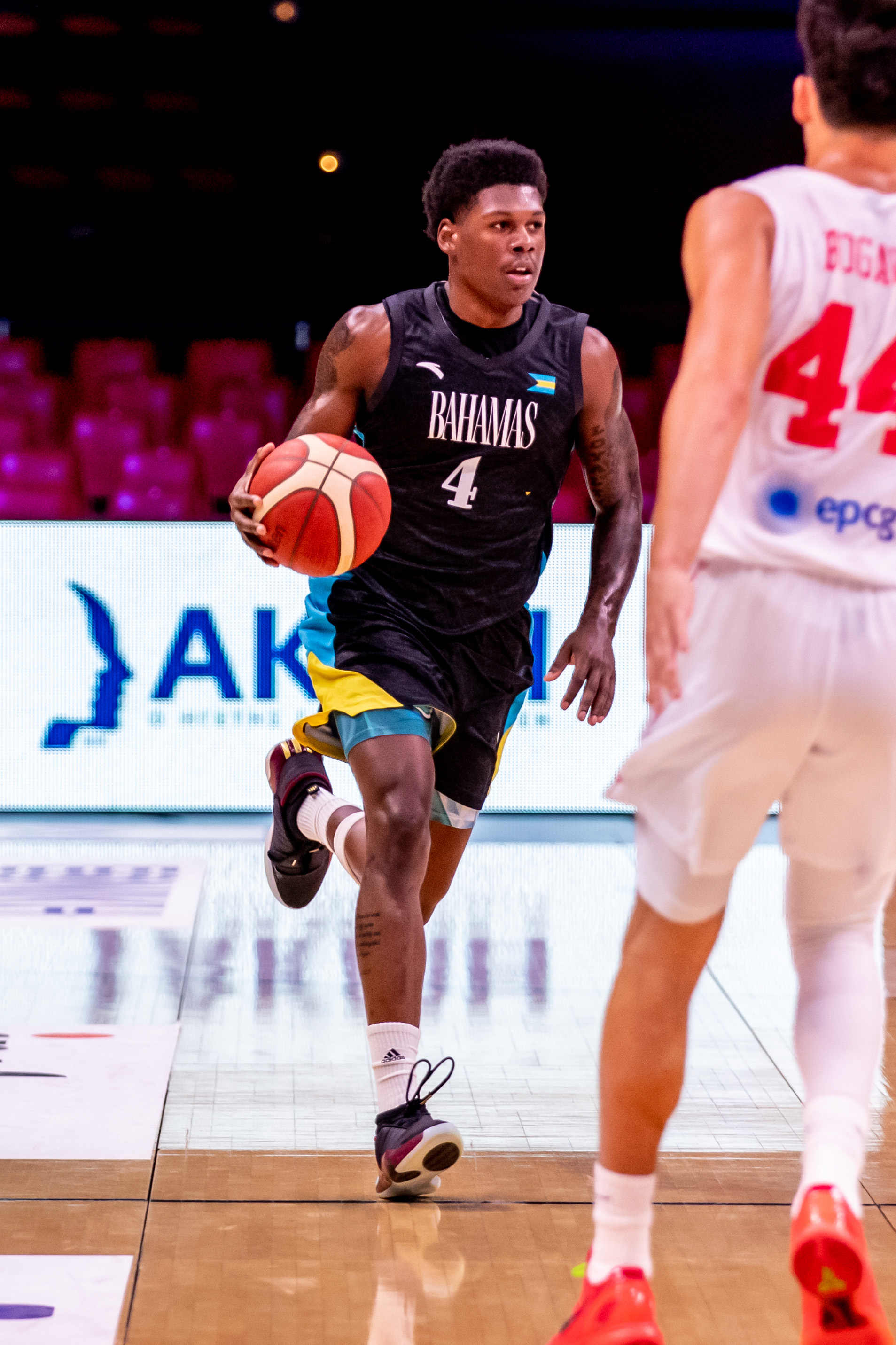
- Storr with the Bahamas in 2024

No. 22 – UNLV Runnin' Rebels
- Position: Shooting guard

Personal information
- Born: August 26, 2003 (age 23) Rockford, Illinois, U.S.
- Listed height: 6 ft 5 in (1.96 m)
- Listed weight: 205 lb (93 kg)

Career information
- High school: Rockford Lutheran (Rockford, Illinois); Kankakee (Kankakee, Illinois); AZ Compass Prep (Chandler, Arizona); IMG Academy (Bradenton, Florida)
- College: St. John's (2022–2023); Wisconsin (2023–2024); Kansas (2024–2025); Ole Miss (2025–2026); UNLV (2026–present)

Career highlights
- Second-team All-Big Ten (2024); Big East All-Freshman Team (2023)

Ambrozino Lecaster Storr Jr. (born August 26, 2003) is an American college basketball player for the UNLV Runnin' Rebels of the Mountain West Conference. He previously played for the St. John's Red Storm, Wisconsin Badgers, Kansas Jayhawks and Ole Miss Rebels.

== Early life ==
Storr was raised in Rockford, Illinois and played his freshman year of high school at Rockford Lutheran School before moving to Kankakee, Illinois and attending Kankakee High School the next season. He then moved to Las Vegas, Nevada with his father, Ambrozino, and attended Bishop Gorman High School to complete his junior year, but did not play due to the COVID-19 season cancellation. Storr spent the 2020–21 season at AZ Compass Prep in Chandler, Arizona, where he helped lead the Dragons to a 28–2 season and a semifinals appearance in the 2021 GEICO Nationals. He was teammates with future NBA player TyTy Washington Jr. After he graduated, Storr attended IMG Academy in Bradenton, Florida for his postgraduate season. As a 6-foot-6-inch (1.98 m) shooting guard, he averaged 22.8 points per game while shooting 60 percent at IMG.

=== Recruiting ===
Storr originally committed to Illinois but decommitted after about a month. After receiving over 40 Division 1 offers from schools like Kansas, LSU, Oklahoma, Virginia Tech, Ole Miss, Storr committed to St. John's.

College recruiting
| Name | Hometown | School | Height | Weight | Commit date |
|---|---|---|---|---|---|
| AJ Storr; SG | Las Vegas, NV | IMG Academy (FL) | 6 ft 6 in (1.98 m) | 200 lb (91 kg) | Aug 4, 2021 |
| AJ Storr; SG | Recruit ratings: Rivals: 247Sports: ESPN: (82) | | | | |
Overall recruit ranking:
Note: In many cases, Scout, Rivals, 247Sports, On3, and ESPN may conflict in their listings of height and weight.; In these cases, the average was taken. ESPN grades are on a 100-point scale.; Sources: "2022 Team Ranking". Rivals.

== College career ==
=== St. John's ===
Storr was named Big East Freshman of the Week three separate times throughout his first season at St. John's. At seasons end, Storr was named to the Big East all-freshman team. Storr started 17 games and finished the season as one of two Johnnies to play in all 33 games. He average 8.8 points per game for the season and scored a season-high 23 points in a loss to Creighton on January 25, 2023. On March 28, 2023, Storr entered the transfer portal 8 days after St. John's announced the hiring of Rick Pitino.

=== Wisconsin ===
After receiving interest from programs like UConn, Gonzaga, Michigan, Memphis, Creighton and Virginia, Storr transferred to Wisconsin. Prior to the start of his sophomore season with the Badgers, Storr competed with the Bahamas national basketball team during their exhibition matches against the Kansas Jayhawks. During those exhibition games, Storr played alongside NBA players Buddy Hield and Eric Gordon. Following the completion of the regular season, Storr was named to the All-Big Ten second team by the coaches and media.

=== Kansas ===
On April 18, 2024, Storr transferred to Kansas. Storr started only a handful of games for Kansas during the 2024–25 season, as he saw his playing time diminish later in the season. He saw career lows in every statistical category.

=== Ole Miss ===
On April 16, 2025, Storr transferred to Ole Miss.

=== UNLV ===
In August 2026, Storr was granted a temporary restraining order against the NCAA and as a result granted a fifth season of eligibility after filing a lawsuit in the state of Tennessee. He committed to play his final season at UNLV. It was his ninth different school in nine years, including high school.

== Career statistics ==
Legend
| GP | Games played | GS | Games started | MPG | Minutes per game |
| FG% | Field goal percentage | 3P% | 3-point field goal percentage | FT% | Free throw percentage |
| RPG | Rebounds per game | APG | Assists per game | SPG | Steals per game |
| BPG | Blocks per game | PPG | Points per game | **Bold** | Career high |

=== College ===
| Year | Team | GP | GS | MPG | FG% | 3P% | FT% | RPG | APG | SPG | BPG | PPG |
|---|---|---|---|---|---|---|---|---|---|---|---|---|
| 2022–23 | St. John's | 33 | 17 | 21.1 | .434 | **.404** | .750 | 1.9 | 0.8 | 0.4 | **0.2** | 8.8 |
| 2023–24 | Wisconsin | **36** | **36** | **28.8** | .434 | .320 | **.812** | **3.9** | 0.9 | 0.6 | 0.1 | **16.8** |
| 2024–25 | Kansas | 34 | 4 | 15.7 | .384 | .291 | .681 | 1.7 | 0.7 | 0.3 | 0.1 | 6.1 |
| 2025–26 | Ole Miss | 35 | 15 | 26.3 | **.448** | .350 | .783 | 3.1 | **1.9** | **0.9** | 0.1 | 15.5 |
| Career | | 138 | 72 | 23.1 | .431 | .341 | .778 | 2.7 | 1.1 | 0.6 | 0.2 | 11.9 |

== Personal life ==
Storr's father, Ambrozino Storr Sr., was born in Nassau, Bahamas. His mother, Annette Brandy, was a standout basketball player at Roberto Clemente Community Academy in Chicago and went on to play at Illinois Central College and University of Missouri–St. Louis before a semi-professional stint. His sister, Ambranette, was a top scorer in the state of Illinois while at Kankakee High School. She also played at Moberly Area Community College, Grand Canyon and Detroit Mercy.

== National team career ==
In August 2023, Storr represented the Bahamas national team in an exhibition against the Kansas Jayhawks. He also played with the national team in exhibition games in 2024, before leaving prior to Olympic qualifying games.
