= 2023–24 Wisconsin Badgers men's basketball team =

American college basketball season

2023–24 Wisconsin Badgers men's basketball

Fort Myers Tip-Off Beach Division champions

NCAA tournament, First Round
- Conference: Big Ten Conference
- Record: 22–14 (11–9 Big Ten)
- Head coach: Greg Gard (9th season)
- Associate head coach: Joe Krabbenhoft (8th season)
- Assistant coaches: Dean Oliver (7th season); Sharif Chambliss (3rd season)
- Home arena: Kohl Center

2023–24 Big Ten Conference men's basketball standings
	Conf.				Overall
Team	W		L	PCT	W		L	PCT
No. 2 Purdue	17	–	3	.850	34	–	5	.872
No. 6 Illinois †	14	–	6	.700	29	–	9	.763
Nebraska	12	–	8	.600	23	–	11	.676
Northwestern	12	–	8	.600	22	–	12	.647
Wisconsin	11	–	9	.550	22	–	14	.611
Indiana	10	–	10	.500	19	–	14	.576
Iowa	10	–	10	.500	19	–	15	.559
Michigan State	10	–	10	.500	20	–	15	.571
Minnesota	9	–	11	.450	19	–	15	.559
Ohio State	9	–	11	.450	22	–	14	.611
Penn State	9	–	11	.450	16	–	17	.485
Maryland	7	–	13	.350	16	–	17	.485
Rutgers	7	–	13	.350	15	–	17	.469
Michigan	3	–	17	.150	8	–	24	.250
† 2024 Big Ten tournament winner Rankings from AP poll

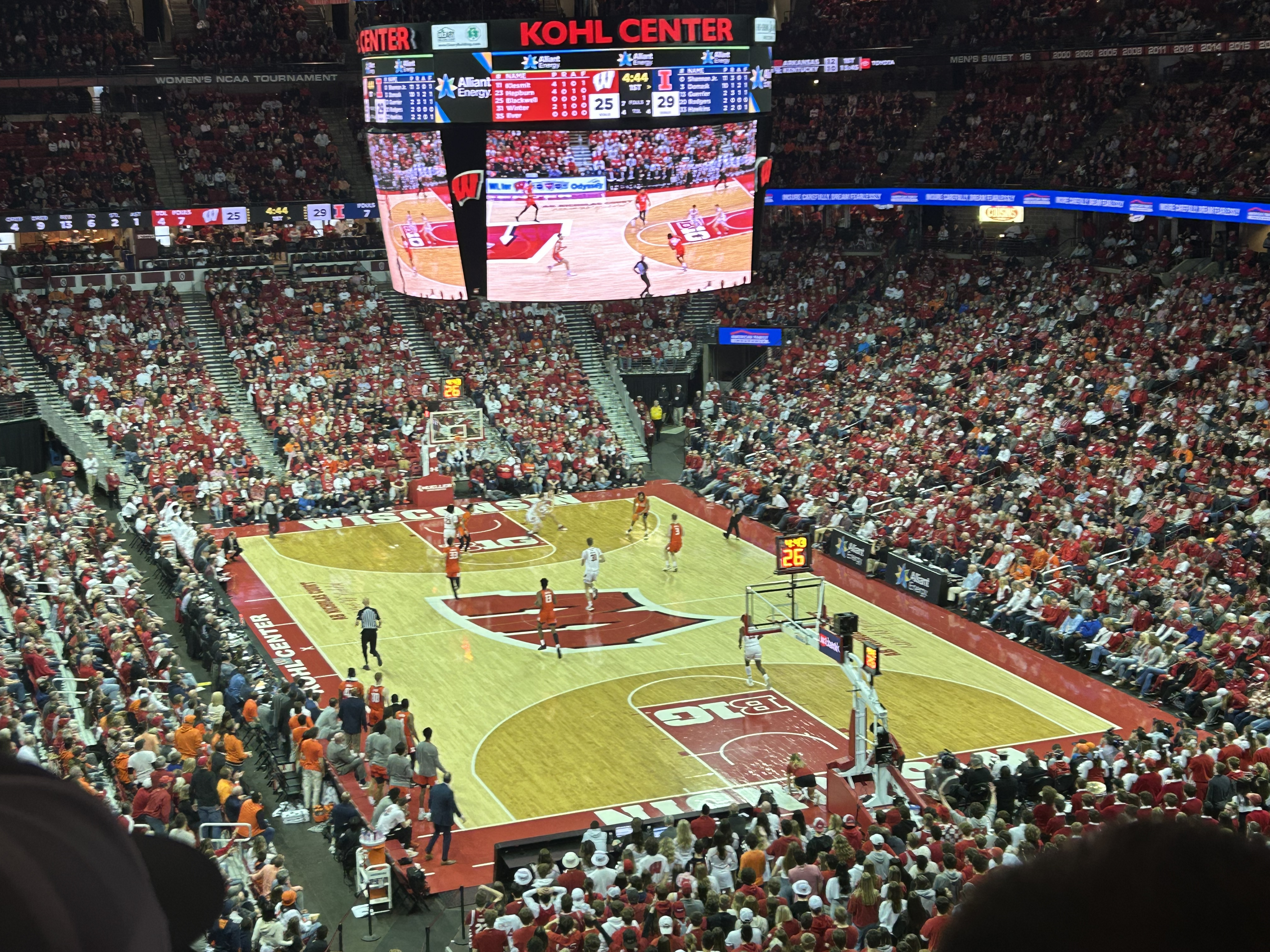
Kohl Center during the game against Illinois

The 2023–24 Wisconsin Badgers men's basketball team represented the University of Wisconsin–Madison in the 2023–24 NCAA Division I men's basketball season. The Badgers, led by ninth-year head coach Greg Gard, played their home games at the Kohl Center in Madison, Wisconsin as members of the Big Ten Conference. They finished the season 22–14, 11–9 in Big Ten play to finish in fifth place. They defeated Maryland, Northwestern, and Purdue to advance to the championship of the Big Ten tournament. There they lost to Illinois. They received an at-large bid to the NCAA tournament as the No. 5 seed in the South region, returning after a one-year absence. They were upset in the first round by James Madison.

The Wisconsin Badgers men's basketball team drew an average home attendance of 15,560 in 17 games in 2023–24.

== Previous season ==
The Badgers finished the 2022–23 season 20–15, 9–11 in Big Ten play to finish in a tie for 11th place. As the No. 12 seed in the Big Ten Tournament, they lost to Ohio State in the first round. They received an at-large bid to the National Invitation Tournament, their fifth trip to the NIT and first since 1996, as the No. 2 seed in Oregon's bracket. The Badgers defeated Bradley, Liberty, and Oregon to advance to the tournament semifinals. There they lost to eventual champion North Texas.

== Offseason ==
=== Departures ===
All players listed as "graduated" are tentative departures unless otherwise noted.

Wisconsin departures
Name	Number	Pos.	Height	Weight	Year	Hometown	Reason for departure
Jordan Davis	2	G	6'4"	200	Junior	La Crosse, WI	Transferred to Illinois State
Jahcobi Neath	0	G	6'4"	190	Junior	Toronto, ON	Transferred to Toronto Metropolitan University
Justin Taphorn	13	G	6'5"	215	Senior	Pekin, IL	Joined staff as a Undergraduate Assistant

=== Incoming transfers ===
Wisconsin incoming transfers
Name	Number	Pos.	Height	Weight	Year	Hometown	Previous school
AJ Storr	2	G	6'6"	200	Freshman	Rockford, IL	St. John's

=== 2023 recruiting class ===
College recruiting
Name	Hometown	School	Height	Weight	Commit date
Gus Yalden; C	Appleton, WI	La Lumiere School	6 ft 8 in (2.03 m)	240 lb (110 kg)	May 17, 2022
Gus Yalden; C	Recruit ratings: Scout: Rivals: 247Sports: (82)				
Nolan Winter; PF	Lakeville, MN	Lakeville North High School	6 ft 10 in (2.08 m)	190 lb (86 kg)	Sep 23, 2022
Nolan Winter; PF	Recruit ratings: Scout: Rivals: 247Sports: (80)				
John Blackwell; G	Bloomfield Hills, MI	Brother Rice High School	6 ft 3 in (1.91 m)	175 lb (79 kg)	Apr 15, 2022
John Blackwell; G	Recruit ratings: Scout: Rivals: 247Sports: (77)				
Overall recruit ranking:
Note: In many cases, Scout, Rivals, 247Sports, On3, and ESPN may conflict in their listings of height and weight.; In these cases, the average was taken. ESPN grades are on a 100-point scale.; Sources: "2023 Wisconsin Commitments". Rivals.; "Men's Basketball Recruiting". Scout.; "ESPN- Wisconsin Badgers Men's Basketball Recruiting". ESPN.; "Scout.com Team Recruiting Rankings". Scout.; "2023 Team Ranking". Rivals.

== Roster ==
2023–24 Wisconsin Badgers men's basketball team
Players
Coaches

Pos.	#	Name	Height	Weight	Year	Previous school	Hometown
G	2	AJ Storr	6 ft 7 in (2.01 m)	205 lb (93 kg)	So	IMG Academy/St. John's	Rockford, Illinois
G	3	Connor Essegian	6 ft 4 in (1.93 m)	195 lb (88 kg)	So	Central Noble High School	Fort Wayne, Indiana
G	4	Kamari McGee	6 ft 0 in (1.83 m)	180 lb (82 kg)	Jr	St. Catherine's High School/Green Bay	Racine, Wisconsin
F	5	Tyler Wahl	6 ft 9 in (2.06 m)	225 lb (102 kg)	GS	North High School	Lakeville, Minnesota
G	10	Isaac Lindsey	6 ft 4 in (1.93 m)	185 lb (84 kg)	RS Jr	Mineral Point High School/UNLV	Mineral Point, Wisconsin
G	11	Max Klesmit	6 ft 4 in (1.93 m)	200 lb (91 kg)	Jr	Neenah High School/Wofford	Neenah, Wisconsin
G	12	Luke Haertle (W)	6 ft 4 in (1.93 m)	215 lb (98 kg)	RS Fr	Lake Country Lutheran	Hartland, Wisconsin
F	14	Carter Gilmore	6 ft 7 in (2.01 m)	232 lb (105 kg)	Jr	Arrowhead High School	Hartland, Wisconsin
G	15	Isaac Gard (W)	6 ft 2 in (1.88 m)	165 lb (75 kg)	So	Oregon High School	Oregon, Wisconsin
F	21	Chris Hodges	6 ft 9 in (2.06 m)	250 lb (113 kg)	RS So	Schaumburg High School	Schaumburg, Illinois
F	22	Steven Crowl	7 ft 0 in (2.13 m)	247 lb (112 kg)	Jr	Eastview High School	Eagan, Minnesota
G	23	Chucky Hepburn	6 ft 2 in (1.88 m)	195 lb (88 kg)	Jr	Bellevue West High School	Omaha, Nebraska
G	25	John Blackwell	6 ft 4 in (1.93 m)	194 lb (88 kg)	Fr	Brother Rice High School	Bloomfield Hills, Michigan
G	30	Ross Candelino (W) (redshirt)	6 ft 5 in (1.96 m)	195 lb (88 kg)	So	Ponte Vedra High School	Jacksonville, Florida
F	31	Nolan Winter	6 ft 11 in (2.11 m)	220 lb (100 kg)	Fr	Lakeville North High School	Lakeville, Minnesota
G	33	Jack Janicki (W) (redshirt)	6 ft 5 in (1.96 m)	190 lb (86 kg)	Fr	White Bear Lake Area High School	White Bear Lake, Minnesota
F	34	Gus Yalden (redshirt)	6 ft 9 in (2.06 m)	245 lb (111 kg)	Fr	La Lumiere School	Appleton, Wisconsin
F	35	Markus Ilver	6 ft 9 in (2.06 m)	225 lb (102 kg)	Jr	Western Reserve Academy	Tallinn, Estonia

Head coach

- Greg Gard (UW-Platteville)

Assistant coach(es)

- Joe Krabbenhoft (Wisconsin)
- Dean Oliver (Iowa)
- Sharif Chambliss (Wisconsin)

Legend

- (C) Team captain
- (S) Suspended
- (I) Ineligible
- (W) Walk-on
- Injured
- Current redshirt

Roster

== Schedule and results ==
Date time, TV	Rank^{#}	Opponent^{#}	Result	Record	High points	High rebounds	High assists	Site (attendance) city, state
Exhibition
November 1, 2023*; 7:00 p.m., BTN Plus		UW–Stevens Point	W 87–44	–	14 – Storr	9 – Winter	6 – Hepburn	Kohl Center (14,095); Madison, WI
Regular season
November 6, 2023*; 7:00 p.m., BTN Plus		Arkansas State	W 105–76	1–0	20 – Hepburn	7 – Winter	6 – Hepburn	Kohl Center (14,033); Madison, WI
November 10, 2023*; 8:00 p.m., Peacock		No. 9 Tennessee	L 70–80	1–1	17 – Storr	9 – Crowl	3 – Klesmit	Kohl Center (17,287); Madison, WI
November 14, 2023*; 5:00 p.m., FS1		at Providence; Gavitt Tipoff Games	L 59–72	1–2	22 – Storr	6 – Crowl	2 – Crowl	Amica Mutual Pavilion (12,069); Providence, RI
November 17, 2023*; 6:00 p.m., BTN Plus		Robert Morris	W 78–68	2–2	18 – Tied	8 – Crowl	5 – Hepburn	Kohl Center (14,189); Madison, WI
November 20, 2023*; 5:00 p.m., FS1		vs. No. 24 Virginia; Fort Myers Tip-Off Semifinal	W 65–41	3–2	15 – Crowl	10 – Tied	6 – Hepburn	Suncoast Credit Union Arena (3,500); Fort Myers, FL
November 22, 2023*; 7:30 p.m., FS1		vs. SMU; Fort Myers Tip-Off Championship	W 69–61	4–2	14 – Wahl	9 – Blackwell	2 – Tied	Suncoast Credit Union Arena (3,500); Fort Myers, FL
November 27, 2023*; 6:00 p.m., BTN		Western Illinois	W 71–49	5–2	13 – Tied	11 – Crowl	3 – Crowl	Kohl Center (14,092); Madison, WI
December 2, 2023*; 11:30 a.m., FOX		No. 3 Marquette; Rivalry/White Out Game	W 75–64	6–2	21 – Klesmit	8 – Crowl	4 – Hepburn	Kohl Center (17,071); Madison, WI
December 5, 2023; 6:00 p.m., Peacock	No. 23	at Michigan State	W 70–57	7–2 (1–0)	22 – Storr	8 – Wahl	8 – Hepburn	Breslin Center (14,797); East Lansing, MI
December 9, 2023*; 2:15 p.m., ESPN	No. 23	at No. 1 Arizona	L 73–98	7–3	17 – Blackwell	7 – Blackwell	6 – Hepburn	McKale Center (14,688); Tucson, AZ
December 14, 2023*; 6:00 p.m., BTN	No. 23	Jacksonville State	W 75–60	8–3	19 – Crowl	9 – Crowl	4 – Hepburn	Kohl Center (12,816); Madison, WI
December 22, 2023*; 7:00 p.m., BTN	No. 24	Chicago State	W 80–53	9–3	29 – Storr	9 – Blackwell	4 – Hepburn	Kohl Center (14,104); Madison, WI
January 2, 2024; 6:00 p.m., BTN	No. 21	Iowa	W 83–72	10–3 (2–0)	19 – Wahl	13 – Crowl	4 – Klesmit	Kohl Center (15,725); Madison, WI
January 6, 2024; 1:15 p.m., BTN	No. 21	Nebraska	W 88–72	11–3 (3–0)	17 – Wahl	8 – Wahl	6 – Hepburn	Kohl Center (15,055); Madison, WI
January 10, 2024; 7:30 p.m., BTN	No. 15	at Ohio State	W 71–60	12–3 (4–0)	18 – Klesmit	6 – Crowl	4 – Hepburn	Value City Arena (11,276); Columbus, OH
January 13, 2024; 11:00 a.m., BTN	No. 15	Northwestern	W 71–63	13–3 (5–0)	24 – Klesmit	8 – Crowl	3 – Tied	Kohl Center (17,071); Madison, WI
January 16, 2024; 8:00 p.m., BTN	No. 11	at Penn State	L 83–87	13–4 (5–1)	23 – Storr	11 – Crowl	5 – Hepburn	Bryce Jordan Center (8,462); University Park, PA
January 19, 2024; 7:30 p.m., FS1	No. 11	Indiana	W 91–79	14–4 (6–1)	26 – Klesmit	8 – Crowl	8 – Crowl	Kohl Center (15,271); Madison, WI
January 23, 2024; 6:00 p.m., BTN	No. 13	at Minnesota	W 61–59	15–4 (7–1)	16 – Wahl	12 – Storr	4 – Tied	Williams Arena (10,013); Minneaplois, MN
January 26, 2024; 7:00 p.m., FS1	No. 13	Michigan State	W 81–66	16–4 (8–1)	28 – Storr	7 – Crowl	3 – Crowl	Kohl Center (17,071); Madison, WI
February 1, 2024; 7:30 p.m., BTN	No. 6	at Nebraska	L 72–80 ^{OT}	16–5 (8–2)	28 – Storr	13 – Crowl	3 – Tied	Pinnacle Bank Arena (15,318); Lincoln, NE
February 4, 2024; 12:00 p.m., CBS	No. 6	No. 2 Purdue	L 69–75	16–6 (8–3)	20 – Wahl	7 – Wahl	5 – Tied	Kohl Center (17,071); Madison, WI
February 7, 2024; 6:00 p.m., BTN	No. 11	at Michigan	L 68–72	16–7 (8–4)	20 – Storr	4 – Tied	2 – Wahl	Crisler Center (10,698); Ann Arbor, MI
February 10, 2024; 11:00 a.m., BTN	No. 11	at Rutgers	L 56–78	16–8 (8–5)	15 – Essegian	13 – Crowl	3 – Hepburn	Jersey Mike's Arena (8,000); Piscataway, NJ
February 13, 2024; 8:00 p.m., Peacock	No. 20	Ohio State	W 62–54	17–8 (9–5)	16 – Crowl	12 – Storr	7 – Hepburn	Kohl Center (14,931); Madison, WI
February 17, 2024; 1:15 p.m., BTN	No. 20	at Iowa	L 86–88 ^{OT}	17–9 (9–6)	22 – Crowl	9 – Hepburn	8 – Klesmit	Carver–Hawkeye Arena (14,998); Iowa City, IA
February 20, 2024; 8:00 p.m., Peacock		Maryland	W 74–70	18–9 (10–6)	18 – Wahl	8 – Tied	3 – Crowl	Kohl Center (15,147); Madison, WI
February 27, 2024; 6:00 p.m., Peacock		at Indiana	L 70–74	18–10 (10–7)	15 – Hepburn	7 – Hepburn	6 – Hepburn	Simon Skjodt Assembly Hall (17,222); Bloomington, IN
March 2, 2024; 12:00 p.m., BTN		No. 13 Illinois	L 83–91	18–11 (10–8)	20 – Wahl	7 – Wahl	3 – Tied	Kohl Center (17,071); Madison, WI
March 7, 2024; 6:00 p.m., FS1		Rutgers	W 77–66	19–11 (11–8)	19 – Storr	11 – Crowl	6 – Hepburn	Kohl Center (15,431); Madison, WI
March 10, 2024; 11:30 a.m., FOX		at No. 3 Purdue	L 70–78	19–12 (11–9)	18 – Blackwell	10 – Wahl	5 – Wahl	Mackey Arena (14,876); West Lafayette, IN
Big Ten tournament
March 14, 2024; 1:30 p.m., BTN	(5)	vs. (12) Maryland; Second Round	W 87–56	20–12	18 – Blackwell	5 – Tied	8 – Hepburn	Target Center (−); Minneapolis, MN
March 15, 2024; 1:30 p.m., BTN	(5)	vs. (4) Northwestern; Quarterfinals	W 70–61	21–12	30 – Storr	7 – Crowl	7 – Klesmit	Target Center (12,609); Minneapolis, MN
March 16, 2024; 12:00 p.m., CBS	(5)	vs. (1) No. 3 Purdue; Semifinals	W 76–75 ^{OT}	22–12	22 – Hepburn	6 – Storr	5 – Klesmit	Target Center (14,138); Minneapolis, MN
March 17, 2024; 2:30 p.m., CBS	(5)	vs. (2) No. 13 Illinois; Championship	L 87–93	22–13	24 – Storr	5 – Tied	5 – Tied	Target Center (13,991); Minneapolis, MN
NCAA tournament
March 22, 2024; 8:40 p.m., CBS	(5 S) No. 23	vs. (12 S) James Madison; First Round	L 61–72	22–14	18 – Klesmit	11 – Crowl	4 – Hepburn	Barclays Center (17,487); Brooklyn, NY
*Non-conference game. ^{#}Rankings from AP Poll. (#) Tournament seedings in parentheses. S=South. All times are in Central Time.

== Rankings ==
Ranking movements Legend: ██ Increase in ranking ██ Decrease in ranking — = Not ranked RV = Received votes т = Tied with team above or below
	Week																				
Poll	Pre	1	2	3	4	5	6	7	8	9	10	11	12	13	14	15	16	17	18	19	Final
AP	RV	RV	—	—	23	23	24	23	21	15	11	13	6	11	20	RV	RV	—	—	23	RV
Coaches	RV	RV	—	—	RV	23	24	23	21	15	8	10	6	9	21т	RV	RV	—	—	24	RV

== Player statistics ==
Individual player statistics (through 2024 season)
			Minutes		Scoring		Total FGs			3-point FGs			Free throws			Rebounds								
Player	GP	GS	Tot	Avg	Pts	Avg	FG	FGA	Pct	3FG	3FA	Pct	FT	FTA	Pct	Off	Def	Tot	Avg	A	TO	Blk	Stl	PF
Storr, AJ	36	36	1037	28.8	605	16.8	216	498	.434	48	150	.320	125	154	.812	40	102	142	3.9	32	57	5	22	41
Crowl, Steven	36	36	1043	29.0	402	11.2	155	279	.556	26	58	.448	66	89	.742	85	176	261	7.3	76	60	17	11	92
Wahl, Tyler	36	36	1022	28.4	382	10.6	146	273	.535	3	16	.188	87	132	.659	70	125	195	5.4	67	60	20	39	95
Klesmit, Max	36	36	1032	28.7	358	9.9	118	270	.437	66	166	.398	56	68	.824	9	68	77	2.1	67	39	3	30	76
Hepburn, Chucky	35	35	1163	33.2	323	9.2	115	268	.429	37	115	.322	56	76	.737	22	95	117	3.3	137	43	3	74	70
Blackwell, John	34	1	628	18.5	272	8.0	82	184	.446	30	66	.455	78	95	.821	23	85	108	3.2	21	27	2	15	63
Essegian, Connor	33	0	243	7.4	104	3.2	37	96	.385	20	66	.303	10	11	.909	2	25	27	0.8	8	12	0	4	24
Winter, Nolan	36	0	338	9.4	88	2.4	30	71	.423	12	39	.308	16	23	.696	16	48	64	1.8	12	11	1	7	33
McGee, Kamari	25	0	207	8.3	52	2.1	19	35	.543	3	11	.273	11	18	.611	3	17	20	0.8	11	8	1	13	32
Gilmore, Carter	33	0	303	9.2	60	1.8	19	39	.487	3	12	.250	19	24	.792	22	24	46	1.4	16	16	1	3	39
Ilver, Markus	27	0	160	5.9	31	1.1	11	35	.314	7	28	.250	2	3	.667	12	23	35	1.3	6	5	2	5	19
Lindsey, Isaac	16	0	60	3.8	10	0.6	4	13	.308	1	7	.143	1	2	.500	1	5	6	0.4	3	3	1	1	9
Hodges, Chris	11	0	22	2.0	1	0.1	0	4	.000	0	0	.–––	1	4	.250	4	2	6	0.5	2	0	3	0	0
Gard, Isaac	6	0	6	1.0	0	0.0	0	1	.000	0	0	.---	0	0	.–––	0	0	0	0.0	0	0	0	0	1
Haertle, Luke	11	0	11	1.0	0	0.0	0	1	.000	0	0	.-––	0	0	.–––	0	2	2	0.2	0	1	0	0	0
Total	36	-	7275	-	2688	74.7	952	2067	.461	256	734	.349	528	699	.755	362	862	1224	34.0	458	358	59	224	594
Opponents	36	-	7275	-	2520	70.0	896	1961	.457	248	672	.369	480	663	.724	278	835	1113	30.9	424	406	144	181	658

Legend
GP	Games played	GS	Games started	Avg	Average per game
FG	Field-goals made	FGA	Field-goal attempts	Off	Offensive rebounds
Def	Defensive rebounds	A	Assists	TO	Turnovers
Blk	Blocks	Stl	Steals	High	Team high
