= Joe Krabbenhoft =

American basketball player

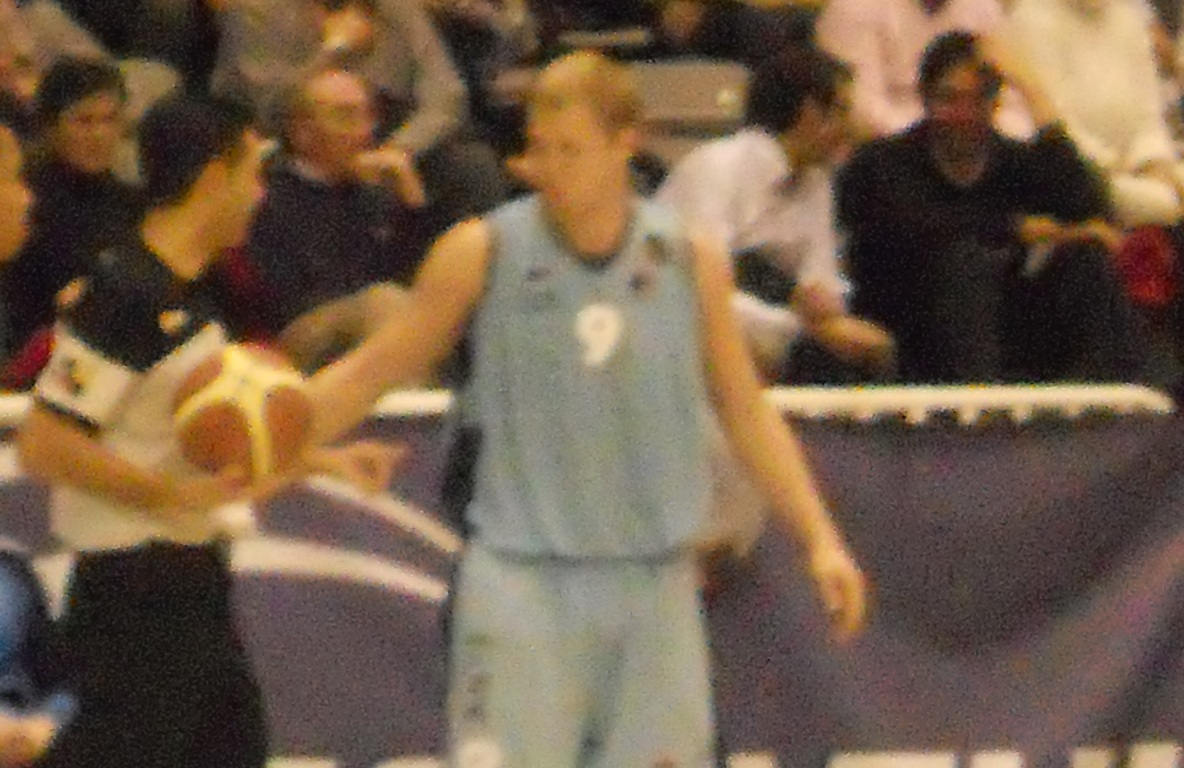
- Krabbenhoft in 2011

Wisconsin Badgers
- Title: Associate head coach
- League: Big Ten Conference

Personal information
- Born: March 24, 1987 (age 39) Spring Valley, Illinois, U.S.
- Listed height: 6 ft 7 in (2.01 m)
- Listed weight: 220 lb (100 kg)

Career information
- High school: Roosevelt (Sioux Falls, South Dakota)
- College: Wisconsin (2005–2009)
- NBA draft: 2009: undrafted
- Playing career: 2009–2012
- Position: Small forward
- Number: 45, 9
- Coaching career: 2012–present

Career history

Playing
- 2009–2010: Sioux Falls Skyforce
- 2010: Seoul SK Knights
- 2010: Lleida Bàsquet
- 2010–2011: Panellinios
- 2011–2012: CB Breogán

Coaching
- 2012–2013: Wisconsin (Video Coordinator)
- 2013–2016: South Dakota State (assistant)
- 2016–2022: Wisconsin (assistant)
- 2022–present: Wisconsin (Associate HC)

Career highlights
- Big Ten All-Defensive team (2008)

Joseph Krabbenhoft (born March 24, 1987) is an American former professional basketball player and current associate head coach at the University of Wisconsin.

== College career ==
Born in Spring Valley, Illinois, Krabbenhoft played college basketball for the Wisconsin Badgers from 2005 to 2009.

== Professional career ==
Krabbenhoft began his professional career in 2009 with the NBA D-League club Sioux Falls Skyforce. He then moved to the Korean League club Seoul SK Knights. He next signed with the Spanish Second Division club CE Lleida Bàsquet at the start of the 2010–11 season, before moving that same season to the Greek League club Panellinios Basket.

== Coaching career ==
On July 11, 2012, the University of Wisconsin announced that Krabbenhoft had been hired as the new video coordinator on head coach Bo Ryan's staff for the 2012–2013 men's basketball season. He succeeded former Wisconsin guard and current UW-Milwaukee assistant coach Sharif Chambliss in the role. After a year as the Badgers' video coordinator, South Dakota State hired Krabbenhoft as an assistant coach. Krabbenhoft spent three seasons coaching at South Dakota State before returning to Wisconsin as an assistant head coach under head coach Greg Gard in 2016.

=== 2022 postgame incident ===
Krabbenhoft was involved in a confrontation with University of Michigan head basketball Coach Juwan Howard following the No. 15 Wisconsin Badgers' 77–63 win over the Michigan Wolverines on February 20, 2022. With 22 seconds remaining in the game and Wisconsin's 3rd string players on the floor, Howard continued to instruct his players to press full court, forcing an out of bounds in the back court with 4 seconds left on the 10 second clock. In order to reset the 10 second clock and his press break, Wisconsin head coach Greg Gard took a timeout to instruct his players to dribble out the clock once over the half court line.

In the post game handshake line, Howard expressed his displeasure with the timeout and attempted to walk past Gard without shaking his hand. Gard grabbed Howard in an attempt to explain the timeout. Howard responded by grabbing Gard's shirt and pointing his finger in Gard's face while shouting. Assistant coaches, players and law enforcement stepped in to separate the coaches. While being restrained, Howard reached across 2 assistant coaches and hit Krabbenhoft with an open hand in the head. During the ensuing fracas, at least three players threw punches including Michigan starting forward Moussa Diabaté, Michigan forward Terrance Williams II, and Wisconsin guard Jahcobi Neath.

The actions of both coaches and the players were widely condemned, with Howard drawing particular condemnation for striking Krabbenhoft. Following a review by the Big Ten Conference, Howard was fined $40,000 and Gard $10,000 for violating the Big Ten's sportsmanship policy. Howard was also suspended for the remaining 5 games of Michigan's season, while Diabate, Williams II, and Neath were each suspended one game.

== Career statistics ==
Legend
GP	Games played	GS	Games started	MPG	Minutes per game
FG%	Field goal percentage	3P%	3-point field goal percentage	FT%	Free throw percentage
RPG	Rebounds per game	APG	Assists per game	SPG	Steals per game
BPG	Blocks per game	PPG	Points per game	**Bold**	Career high

=== College ===
Year	Team	GP	GS	MPG	FG%	3P%	FT%	RPG	APG	SPG	BPG	PPG
2005–06	Wisconsin	31	0	16.3	.347	.276	.700	4.2	1.4	0.4	0.2	3.6
2006–07	Wisconsin	**36**	1	20.1	**.492**	**.400**	.706	4.8	1.6	0.6	0.1	4.8
2007–08	Wisconsin	**36**	**36**	**31.1**	.485	.214	.750	6.5	**2.5**	0.7	0.2	7.6
2008–09	Wisconsin	33	33	30.4	.480	.364	**.846**	**6.7**	**2.5**	**0.9**	**0.5**	**8.2**
Career		136	70	24.6	.462	.313	.757	5.6	2.0	0.6	0.2	6.1
