= John Tonje =

American basketball player (born 2001)

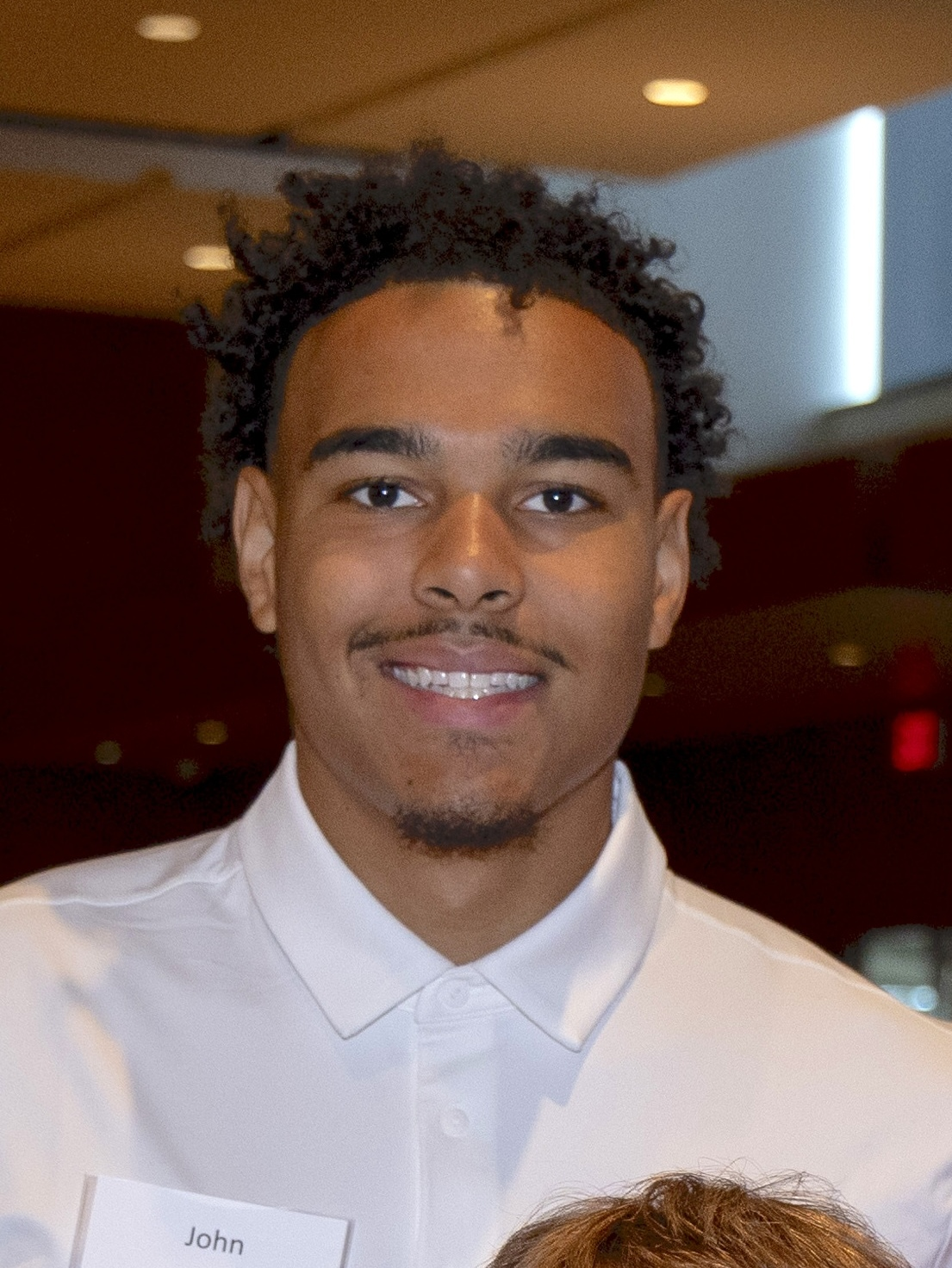
- Tonje in 2024

No. 2 – Portland Trail Blazers
- Position: Shooting guard
- League: NBA

Personal information
- Born: April 23, 2001 (age 25) North Omaha, Nebraska, U.S.
- Listed height: 6 ft 4 in (1.93 m)
- Listed weight: 218 lb (99 kg)

Career information
- High school: Omaha Central (Omaha, Nebraska)
- College: Colorado State (2019–2023); Missouri (2023–2024); Wisconsin (2024–2025)
- NBA draft: 2025: 2nd round, 53rd overall pick
- Drafted by: Utah Jazz
- Playing career: 2025–present

Career history
- 2025–2026: Salt Lake City Stars
- 2026: Boston Celtics
- 2026: →Maine Celtics
- 2026–present: Portland Trail Blazers
- 2026–present: →Rip City Remix

Career highlights
- Consensus second-team All-American (2025); First-team All-Big Ten (2025)
- Stats at NBA.com
- Stats at Basketball Reference

John Herbert Tonje (/tɑːnˈdʒeɪ/; born April 23, 2001) is an American professional basketball player for the Portland Trail Blazers of the National Basketball Association (NBA), on a two-way contract with the Rip City Remix of the NBA G League. He played college basketball for the Colorado State Rams, Missouri Tigers and Wisconsin Badgers. Tonje was selected by the Utah Jazz in the second round of the 2025 NBA draft.

== High school career ==
Tonje attended Omaha Central High School in Omaha, Nebraska, where he played basketball. As a sophomore, Tonje averaged 1.6 points per game but improved to 13.6 points per game as a junior. He was the second leading scorer for the Omaha Central Eagles during his junior campaign and connected on 46 percent of his three-point attempts. As a senior, Tonje averaged a Nebraska Class A State best 23.8 points along with 6.1 rebounds, 1.8 steals and 1.4 assists per game. He led the Eagles to a 22–6 record and a runner-up finish at the state tournament. His 73 triples and 82 percent free throw accuracy were tops at Class A. He set his school's single-season scoring record as a senior and earned first-team All-State by USA Today and All-Class State All-Tournament team honors.

=== Recruiting ===
Tonje received only 3 NCAA Division I or NCAA Division II offers out of high school from Nebraska Omaha, Missouri Western and Colorado State.

College recruiting
Name	Hometown	School	Height	Weight	Commit date
John Tonje; SG	North Omaha, NE	Omaha Central (NE)	6 ft 5 in (1.96 m)	195 lb (88 kg)	Mar 11, 2019
John Tonje; SG	Recruit ratings: Rivals: 247Sports: ESPN: (NR)				
Overall recruit ranking:
Note: In many cases, Scout, Rivals, 247Sports, On3, and ESPN may conflict in their listings of height and weight.; In these cases, the average was taken. ESPN grades are on a 100-point scale.; Sources: "Colorado State Commit List for 2019". Rivals.; "Men's Basketball Recruiting". Scout.; "ESPN – Colorado State Rams Basketball Recruiting 2019". ESPN.; "Scout.com Team Recruiting Rankings". Scout.; "2019 Team Ranking". Rivals.

== College career ==
=== Colorado State ===
Tonje was a key contributor off the bench for the Rams during his freshman and sophomore seasons. Tonje scored a then-career-high 31 points in the first game of his junior season against Oral Roberts. Tonje was a key to the success being dubbed the sixth man that helped lead the Rams to an NIT and getting to the semifinals. Tonje bounced back and forth between the bench and starting lineup throughout his junior season. He was a big part of the success of the 2020–21 Colorado State Rams team that had a program best 16–1 start to the season. Tonje and the Rams qualified for the 2022 NCAA Division I men's basketball tournament as an at-large bid for the program's first time since 2013 finishing the season with a 25–6 record. The sixth-seeded Rams were upset by 11th-seeded Michigan. Tonje became a full-time starter for the first time during his senior season. He posted career-per-game highs in points (14.6), rebounds (4.7), assists (1.3), steals (0.8) and blocks (0.3). Tonje decided to enter the transfer portal after his fourth season due to the extra year of eligibility from to the COVID-19 season rule.

=== Missouri ===
Tonje decided to transfer to Missouri. Tonje only appeared in eight games with the Tigers due to a season-ending foot injury. Tonje was granted a medical redshirt and a sixth year of eligibility. He then decided to enter the transfer portal for a second time.

=== Wisconsin ===
Tonje was ranked as the 296th transfer portal player following the 2023–24 season. Tonje originally committed to Richard Pitino and New Mexico. Less than a week later, Tonje decommitted from New Mexico and committed to Wisconsin. In only his fourth career game with the Badgers, Tonje scored a career-high 41 points in an upset victory over the ninth-ranked Arizona Wildcats. His 41 points were the fourth most in a single game in Badgers history. Tonje also broke the Wisconsin single-game record for made free throws with 21. Tonje was a unanimous pick to the first-team All-Big Ten following the regular season. On March 22, 2025, Tonje set a Wisconsin program record by scoring 37 points in his final collegiate game during a loss in the round of 32 to BYU in the 2025 NCAA Division I men's basketball tournament.

== Professional career ==
=== Salt Lake City Stars (2025–2026) ===
Tonje was selected by the Utah Jazz with the 53rd pick in the second round of the 2025 NBA draft. On August 26, 2025, Tonje signed a two-way contract with the Jazz. Under the terms of the deal, he would split time between the Jazz and their NBA G League affiliate, the Salt Lake City Stars.

=== Boston Celtics (2026) ===
On February 5, 2026, Tonje was traded to the Boston Celtics in exchange for center Chris Boucher and a future second-round pick. On February 19, the Celtics converted Tonje's two-way contract into a 10-day contract. He made his NBA debut on February 24 against the Phoenix Suns. On March 1, the Celtics signed Tonje to a two-way contract. He made six total appearances for Boston, averaging 2.5 points, 1.0 rebounds, and 0.3 assists.

=== Portland Trail Blazers (2026–present) ===
On July 25, 2026, Tonje signed a two-way contract with the Portland Trail Blazers.

== Career statistics ==
Legend
GP	Games played	GS	Games started	MPG	Minutes per game
FG%	Field goal percentage	3P%	3-point field goal percentage	FT%	Free throw percentage
RPG	Rebounds per game	APG	Assists per game	SPG	Steals per game
BPG	Blocks per game	PPG	Points per game	**Bold**	Career high

=== NBA ===
Year	Team	GP	GS	MPG	FG%	3P%	FT%	RPG	APG	SPG	BPG	PPG
2025–26	Boston	6	0	7.0	.286	.300	1.000	1.0	.3	.3	.0	2.5
Career		6	0	7.0	.286	.300	1.000	1.0	.3	.3	.0	2.5

=== College ===
Year	Team	GP	GS	MPG	FG%	3P%	FT%	RPG	APG	SPG	BPG	PPG
2019–20	Colorado State	31	0	8.4	.461	**.435**	.677	1.0	.3	.2	.0	3.6
2020–21	Colorado State	28	1	20.2	.389	.313	.857	2.9	.8	.4	.2	6.6
2021–22	Colorado State	30	12	25.3	.461	.364	.821	3.0	.9	.4	.2	9.1
2022–23	Colorado State	33	33	**31.3**	.473	.389	.815	4.7	1.3	**.8**	**.3**	14.6
2023–24	Missouri	8	4	9.8	**.500**	.333	**1.000**	.9	.4	.3	.1	2.6
2024–25	Wisconsin	**37**	**37**	31.1	.465	.388	.909	**5.3**	**1.8**	.7	.2	**19.6**
Career		167	87	23.0	.457	.378	.858	3.4	1.0	.5	.2	10.8

== Personal life ==
Tonje is the son of Sara and Jean. His father, Jean "Bertin" Tonje, is a native of Cameroon and played soccer for the Cameroon national football team. He has two brothers, Malcolm and Texan. He earned his bachelor's degree from Colorado State in Business/Real Estate and is currently studying Sports Leadership as a graduate student.

Tonje is a Christian. He frequently mentions his faith on social media. He has said, "Sometimes it's hard to believe. Last night, I was reading an article about being All-American, which, I mean, doesn't even look right. But, with work and my belief in God, I think anything's possible."

== See also ==
- List of NCAA Division I men's basketball career games played leaders
