= 2025–26 Ohio State Buckeyes men's basketball team =

American college basketball season

2025–26 Ohio State Buckeyes men's basketball

NCAA tournament, First round
- Conference: Big Ten Conference
- Record: 21–13 (12–8 Big Ten)
- Head coach: Jake Diebler (2nd season)
- Associate head coach: Joel Justus (2nd season)
- Assistant coaches: Dave Dickerson (2nd, 10th overall season); Jamall Walker (2nd season); Luke Simons (2nd season); Brian Walsh (1st season)
- Home arena: Value City Arena

2025–26 Big Ten Conference men's basketball standings
| | Conf. | | | | Overall |
| Team | W | | L | PCT | W | | L | PCT |
|---|---|---|---|---|---|---|---|---|
| No. 1 Michigan | 19 | – | 1 | .950 | 37 | – | 3 | .925 |
| No. 14 Nebraska | 15 | – | 5 | .750 | 28 | – | 7 | .800 |
| No. 5 Illinois | 15 | – | 5 | .750 | 28 | – | 9 | .757 |
| No. 11 Michigan State | 15 | – | 5 | .750 | 27 | – | 8 | .771 |
| No. 25 Wisconsin | 14 | – | 6 | .700 | 24 | – | 11 | .686 |
| No. 6 Purdue † | 13 | – | 7 | .650 | 30 | – | 9 | .769 |
| UCLA | 13 | – | 7 | .650 | 24 | – | 12 | .667 |
| Ohio State | 12 | – | 8 | .600 | 21 | – | 13 | .618 |
| No. 15 Iowa | 10 | – | 10 | .500 | 24 | – | 13 | .649 |
| Indiana | 9 | – | 11 | .450 | 18 | – | 14 | .563 |
| Minnesota | 8 | – | 12 | .400 | 15 | – | 18 | .455 |
| USC | 7 | – | 13 | .350 | 18 | – | 14 | .563 |
| Washington | 7 | – | 13 | .350 | 16 | – | 17 | .485 |
| Rutgers | 6 | – | 14 | .300 | 14 | – | 20 | .412 |
| Northwestern | 5 | – | 15 | .250 | 15 | – | 19 | .441 |
| Oregon | 5 | – | 15 | .250 | 12 | – | 20 | .375 |
| Maryland | 4 | – | 16 | .200 | 12 | – | 21 | .364 |
| Penn State | 3 | – | 17 | .150 | 12 | – | 20 | .375 |
† 2026 Big Ten tournament winner Rankings from AP poll

The 2025–26 Ohio State Buckeyes men's basketball team represented the Ohio State University during the 2025–26 NCAA Division I men's basketball season. They were led by second-year head coach Jake Diebler and played their home games at Value City Arena in Columbus, Ohio, as a member of the Big Ten Conference.

== Previous season ==
The Buckeyes finished the 2024–25 season 17–15, 9–11 in Big Ten play to finish in ninth place. As the No. 10 seed in the Big Ten tournament, they lost to Iowa in the first round. The Buckeyes received a bid for the inaugural College Basketball Crown, but declined.

== Offseason ==
=== Departures ===
Ohio State departures
| Name | Number | Pos. | Height | Weight | Year | Hometown | Reason for departure |
|---|---|---|---|---|---|---|---|
| Meechie Johnson | 1 | G | 6'2" | 185 | Senior | Cleveland, OH | Transferred to South Carolina |
| Aaron Bradshaw | 4 | F | 7'1" | 215 | Sophomore | Rahway, NJ | Transferred to Memphis |
| Ques Glover | 6 | G | 6'0" | 185 | GS Senior | Knoxville, TN | Graduated |
| Micah Parrish | 8 | G | 6'6" | 205 | GS Senior | Detroit, MI | Graduated |
| Colby Baumann | 10 | G | 6'3" | 185 | Junior | Houston, TX | Walk-on; graduated |
| Evan Mahaffey | 12 | G | 6'6" | 200 | Junior | Cincinnati, OH | Transferred to Akron |
| Sean Stewart | 13 | F | 6'9" | 220 | Sophomore | Windermere, FL | Transferred to Oregon |
| Austin Parks | 25 | C | 6'10" | 260 | Sophomore | St. Marys, OH | Transferred to Toledo |

=== Incoming transfers ===
Ohio State incoming transfers
| Name | Number | Pos. | Height | Weight | Year | Hometown | Previous school |
|---|---|---|---|---|---|---|---|
| Gabe Cupps | 4 | G | 6'2" | 180 | RS Sophomore | Dayton, OH | Indiana |
| Puff Johnson | 6 | G/F | 6'8" | 200 | GS Senior | Moon Township, PA | Penn State |
| Christoph Tilly | 13 | C | 7'0" | 240 | Senior | Berlin, Germany | Santa Clara |
| Brandon Noel | 14 | F | 6'8" | 240 | GS Senior | Lucasville, OH | Wright State |
| Josh Ojianwuna | 17 | F | 6'10" | 270 | Senior | Asaba, Nigeria | Baylor |

=== Recruiting classes ===
==== 2025 recruiting class ====
College recruiting information
| Name | Hometown | School | Height | Weight | Commit date |
|---|---|---|---|---|---|
| A'mare Bynum; C | Omaha, Nebraska | Link Academy | 6 ft 8 in (2.03 m) | 225 lb (102 kg) | Oct 22, 2024 |
| A'mare Bynum; C | Recruit ratings: Rivals: 247Sports: ESPN: (84) | | | | |
| Myles Herro; PG | Milwaukee, Wisconsin | Whitnall High School | 6 ft 3 in (1.91 m) | 165 lb (75 kg) | Jun 2, 2025 |
| Myles Herro; PG | Recruit ratings: Rivals: 247Sports: | | | | |
| Mathieu Grujicic; SG | Germany | Alba Berlin | 6 ft 5 in (1.96 m) | 200 lb (91 kg) | Jun 3, 2025 |
| Mathieu Grujicic; SG | Recruit ratings: No ratings found | | | | |
Overall recruit ranking: Rivals: 46 247Sports: 47 ESPN: —
Note: In many cases, Scout, Rivals, 247Sports, On3, and ESPN may conflict in their listings of height and weight.; In these cases, the average was taken. ESPN grades are on a 100-point scale.; Sources: "Ohio State 2025 Basketball Commitments". Rivals.; "2025 Ohio State Buckeyes Recruiting Class". ESPN.; "2025 Team Ranking". Rivals.

==== 2026 recruiting class ====
College recruiting information (2026)
| Name | Hometown | School | Height | Weight | Commit date |
|---|---|---|---|---|---|
| Alex Smith; PF | Columbus, Ohio | Upper Arlington High School | 6 ft 9 in (2.06 m) | 195 lb (88 kg) | Sep 2, 2024 |
| Alex Smith; PF | Recruit ratings: Rivals: 247Sports: ESPN: (81) | | | | |
| Anthony Thompson; SF | Lebanon, Ohio | Western Reserve Academy | 6 ft 8 in (2.03 m) | 205 lb (93 kg) | Oct 21, 2025 |
| Anthony Thompson; SF | Recruit ratings: Rivals: 247Sports: ESPN: (92) | | | | |
Overall recruit ranking: Rivals: 5 247Sports: 3 ESPN: —
Note: In many cases, Scout, Rivals, 247Sports, On3, and ESPN may conflict in their listings of height and weight.; In these cases, the average was taken. ESPN grades are on a 100-point scale.; Sources: "Ohio State 2026 Basketball Commitments". Rivals.; "2026 Ohio State Buckeyes Recruiting Class". ESPN.; "2026 Team Ranking". Rivals.

== Roster ==
2025–26 Ohio State Buckeyes men's basketball team
Players
Coaches

| Pos. | # | Name | Height | Weight | Year | Previous school | Hometown |
|---|---|---|---|---|---|---|---|
| G | 0 | John Mobley Jr. | 6 ft 2 in (1.88 m) | 185 lb (84 kg) | So | Wasatch Academy | Reynoldsburg, OH |
| F | 1 | Amare Bynum | 6 ft 8 in (2.03 m) | 240 lb (109 kg) | Fr | Link Academy | Omaha, NE |
| G | 2 | Bruce Thornton | 6 ft 2 in (1.88 m) | 215 lb (98 kg) | Sr | Milton HS | Fairburn, GA |
| G | 3 | Taison Chatman | 6 ft 4 in (1.93 m) | 190 lb (86 kg) | RS So | Totino-Grace HS | Minneapolis, MN |
| G | 4 | Gabe Cupps | 6 ft 2 in (1.88 m) | 180 lb (82 kg) | RS So | Indiana | Dayton, OH |
| G/F | 6 | Puff Johnson | 6 ft 8 in (2.03 m) | 200 lb (91 kg) | GS | Penn State | Moon Township, PA |
| C | 7 | Ivan Njegovan | 7 ft 2 in (2.18 m) | 260 lb (118 kg) | So | Gimnazija Vladimira-Nazora | Otočac, Croatia |
| G | 8 | Myles Herro | 6 ft 3 in (1.91 m) | 165 lb (75 kg) | Fr | Whitnall HS | Milwaukee, WI |
| G | 9 | Mathieu Grujicic | 6 ft 7 in (2.01 m) | 210 lb (95 kg) | Fr | Alba Berlin | Berlin, Germany |
| C | 13 | Christoph Tilly | 7 ft 0 in (2.13 m) | 240 lb (109 kg) | Sr | Santa Clara | Berlin, Germany |
| F | 14 | Brandon Noel | 6 ft 8 in (2.03 m) | 240 lb (109 kg) | GS | Wright State | Lucasville, OH |
| F | 17 | Josh Ojianwuna | 6 ft 10 in (2.08 m) | 270 lb (122 kg) | Sr | Baylor | Asaba, Nigeria |
| F | 20 | Colin White | 6 ft 6 in (1.98 m) | 220 lb (100 kg) | So | Ottawa-Glandorf HS | Ottawa, OH |
| F | 21 | Devin Royal | 6 ft 6 in (1.98 m) | 230 lb (104 kg) | Jr | Pickerington HS Central | Pickerington, OH |
| G | 55 | Braylen Nash (W) | 6 ft 4 in (1.93 m) | 190 lb (86 kg) | So | New Albany HS | New Albany, OH |

Head coach

- Jake Diebler (Valparaiso)

Assistant coach(es)

- Joel Justus (UNC Wilmington)
- Dave Dickerson (Maryland)
- Jamall Walker (Saint Louis)
- Luke Simons (Purdue)
- Brian Walsh (Akron)

Legend

- (C) Team captain
- (S) Suspended
- (I) Ineligible
- (W) Walk-on
- Injured
- Current redshirt

Roster

== Schedule and results ==
| Date time, TV | Rank^{#} | Opponent^{#} | Result | Record | High points | High rebounds | High assists | Site (attendance) city, state |
Exhibition
| October 26, 2025*; 2:00 p.m., B1G+ | | Ohio | W 103–74 | - | 18 – Noel | 6 – Njegovan | 7 – Tilly | Value City Arena (8,909); Columbus, OH |
Regular season
| November 3, 2025*; 6:30 p.m., B1G+ | | IU Indy | W 118–102 | 1–0 | 26 – Tied | 10 – Noel | 8 – Mobley Jr. | Value City Arena (8,141); Columbus, OH |
| November 7, 2025*; 6:30 p.m., BTN | | Purdue Fort Wayne | W 94–68 | 2–0 | 38 – Thornton | 6 – Tilly | 5 – Thornton | Value City Arena (8,926); Columbus, OH |
| November 11, 2025*; 6:30 p.m., B1G+ | | Appalachian State | W 75–53 | 3–0 | 17 – Noel | 11 – Noel | 4 – Tilly | Value City Arena (7,938); Columbus, OH |
| November 16, 2025*; 12:30 p.m., FS1 | | Notre Dame | W 64–63 | 4–0 | 24 – Thornton | 6 – Royal | 2 – Tied | Value City Arena (12,357); Columbus, OH |
| November 20, 2025*; 8:00 p.m., BTN | | Western Michigan | W 91–58 | 5–0 | 17 – Tilly | 10 – Tied | 7 – Tilly | Value City Arena (8,294); Columbus, OH |
| November 25, 2025*; 6:30 p.m., BTN | | Mount St. Mary's | W 113–60 | 6–0 | 26 – Mobley Jr. | 7 – Noel | 5 – Thornton | Value City Arena (10,140); Columbus, OH |
| November 28, 2025*; 7:00 p.m., ESPN2 | | at Pittsburgh | L 66–67 | 6–1 | 22 – Royal | 13 – Thornton | 3 – Cupps | Petersen Events Center (6,299); Pittsburgh, PA |
| December 6, 2025; 2:00 p.m., BTN | | at Northwestern | W 86–82 | 7–1 (1–0) | 29 – Noel | 7 – Noel | 10 – Thornton | Welsh–Ryan Arena (5,448); Evanston, IL |
| December 9, 2025; 7:30 p.m., Peacock | | No. 13 Illinois | L 80–88 | 7–2 (1–1) | 34 – Thornton | 8 – Tilly | 6 – Thornton | Value City Arena (9,974); Columbus, OH |
| December 13, 2025*; 8:00 p.m., ESPNU | | vs. West Virginia; Cleveland Hoops Showdown | W 89–88 ^{2OT} | 8–2 | 21 – Thornton | 11 – Tilly | 5 – Tilly | Rocket Arena (6,465); Cleveland, OH |
| December 20, 2025*; 3:00 p.m., CBS | | vs. No. 12 North Carolina; CBS Sports Classic | L 70–71 | 8–3 | 18 – Royal | 10 – Tilly | 4 – Tied | State Farm Arena (16,951); Atlanta, GA |
| December 23, 2025*; 2:00 p.m., BTN | | Grambling State | W 89–63 | 9–3 | 20 – Mobley Jr. | 9 – Bynum | 4 – Mobley Jr. | Value City Arena (10,697); Columbus, OH |
| January 2, 2026; 8:00 p.m., Peacock | | at Rutgers | W 80–73 | 10–3 (2–1) | 20 – Thornton | 10 – Thornton | 4 – Royal | Jersey Mike's Arena (8,000); Piscataway, NJ |
| January 5, 2026; 6:30 p.m., FS1 | | No. 10 Nebraska | L 69–72 | 10–4 (2–2) | 22 – Mobley Jr. | 9 – Bynum | 7 – Thornton | Value City Arena (10,382); Columbus, OH |
| January 8, 2026; 10:30 p.m., BTN | | at Oregon | W 72–62 | 11–4 (3–2) | 14 – Tilly | 10 – Royal | 3 – Royal | Matthew Knight Arena (6,037); Eugene, OR |
| January 11, 2026; 6:00 p.m., Peacock | | at Washington | L 74–81 | 11–5 (3–3) | 28 – Thornton | 8 – Royal | 4 – Mobley, Jr. | Alaska Airlines Arena (8,163); Seattle, WA |
| January 17, 2026; 1:00 p.m., CBS | | UCLA | W 86–74 | 12–5 (4–3) | 28 – Mobley Jr. | 9 – Royal | 5 – Tilly | Value City Arena (12,937); Columbus, OH |
| January 20, 2026; 6:30 p.m., BTN | | Minnesota | W 82–74 ^{OT} | 13–5 (5–3) | 26 – Mobley Jr. | 9 – Njegovan | 3 – Thornton | Value City Arena (8,750); Columbus, OH |
| January 23, 2026; 8:00 p.m., FOX | | at No. 3 Michigan; Rivalry | L 62–74 | 13–6 (5–4) | 22 – Mobley Jr. | 9 – Thornton | 2 – Mobley Jr. | Crisler Center (12,707); Ann Arbor, MI |
| January 26, 2026; 7:00 p.m., FS1 | | Penn State | W 84–78 | 14–6 (6–4) | 25 – Mobley Jr. | 5 – Bynum | 5 – Mobley Jr. | Value City Arena (10,358); Columbus, OH |
| January 31, 2026; 2:00 p.m., FOX | | at Wisconsin | L 82–92 | 14–7 (6–5) | 18 – Tied | 7 – Bynum | 2 – Tied | Kohl Center (16,838); Madison, WI |
| February 5, 2026; 8:30 p.m., FS1 | | at Maryland | W 82–62 | 15–7 (7–5) | 19 – Tilly | 3 – Tied | 4 – Tied | Xfinity Center (12,358); College Park, MD |
| February 8, 2026; 1:00 p.m., CBS | | No. 2 Michigan; Rivalry | L 61–82 | 15–8 (7–6) | 16 – Thornton | 6 – Tied | 4 – Thornton | Value City Arena (17,684); Columbus, OH |
| February 11, 2026; 6:30 p.m., BTN | | USC | W 89–82 | 16–8 (8–6) | 21 – Thornton | 7 – Royal | 8 – Thornton | Value City Arena (11,367); Columbus, OH |
| February 14, 2025*; 8:00 p.m., FOX | | vs. No. 15 Virginia; Nashville Hoops Showdown | L 66–70 | 16–9 | 28 – Thornton | 6 – Bynum | 3 – Cupps | Bridgestone Arena (6,438); Nashville, TN |
| February 17, 2026; 8:30 p.m., FS1 | | No. 24 Wisconsin | W 86–69 | 17–9 (9–6) | 27 – Thornton | 9 – Thornton | 8 – Thornton | Value City Arena (9,006); Columbus, OH |
| February 22, 2026; 1:00 p.m., CBS | | at No. 15 Michigan State | L 60–66 | 17–10 (9–7) | 32 – Thornton | 8 – Tilly | 3 – Chatman | Breslin Student Events Center (14,797); East Lansing, MI |
| February 25, 2026; 9:00 p.m., BTN | | at Iowa | L 57–74 | 17–11 (9–8) | 16 – Royal | 6 – Bynum | 3 – Mobley Jr. | Carver–Hawkeye Arena (10,368); Iowa City, IA |
| March 1, 2026; 1:30 p.m., CBS | | No. 8 Purdue | W 82–74 | 18–11 (10–8) | 21 – Mobley Jr. | 9 – Royal | 3 – Mobley Jr. | Value City Arena (15,524); Columbus, OH |
| March 4, 2026; 7:30 p.m., Peacock | | at Penn State | W 94–62 | 19–11 (11–8) | 28 – Mobley Jr. | 9 – Royal | 5 – Thornton | Bryce Jordan Center (6,137); State College, PA |
| March 7, 2026; 5:30 p.m., FOX | | Indiana | W 91–78 | 20–11 (12–8) | 25 – Thornton | 9 – Bynum | 7 – Thornton | Value City Arena (18,809); Columbus, OH |
Big Ten tournament
| March 12, 2026; 12:00 p.m., BTN | (8) | vs. (9) Iowa; Third round | W 72–69 | 21–11 | 24 – Thornton | 6 – Thornton | 4 – Bynum | United Center (16,157); Chicago, IL |
| March 13, 2026; 12:00 p.m., BTN | (8) | vs. (1) No. 3 Michigan; Quarterfinal / Rivalry | L 67–71 | 21–12 | 22 – Thornton | 11 – Royal | 4 – Thornton | United Center (18,988); Chicago, IL |
NCAA tournament
| March 19, 2026*; 12:15 p.m., CBS | (8 E) | vs. (9 E) TCU; First round | L 64–66 | 21–13 | 15 – Mobley Jr. | 9 – Bynum | 6 – Tied | Bon Secours Wellness Arena (13,919); Greenville, SC |
*Non-conference game. ^{#}Rankings from AP Poll. (#) Tournament seedings in parentheses. E=East. All times are in Eastern Time.

== Exhibition ==
=== Ohio ===
B1G+

October 26, 2025
2:00 p.m.

Box score

Ohio Bobcats 74, Ohio State Buckeyes 103
Scoring by half: 37–52, 37–51
| Pts: 2 tied, 14; Rebs: Jalen Breath, 7 Asts: Jackson Paveletzke, 7 | Pts: Brandon Noel, 18; Rebs: Ivan Njegovan, 6 Asts: Christoph Tilly, 7 |

Value City Arena, Columbus, OH
Referees: Larry Scirotto, Amy Bonner, Andy O'Brien

== Game summaries ==
=== vs IU Indy ===
B1G+

November 3, 2025
6:30 p.m.

Box score

IU Indy Jaguars 102, Ohio State Buckeyes 118
Scoring by half: 50–66, 52–52
| Pts: Kameron Tinsley, 22; Rebs: Finley Woodward, 6 Asts: Finley Woodward, 8 | Pts: 2 tied, 26; Rebs: Brandon Noel, 10; Asts: John Mobley Jr., 8 |

Value City Arena, Columbus, OH
Attendance: 8,141
Referees: Luke Schumer, Rob Kueneman, Paul Szelc

=== vs Purdue Fort Wayne ===
BTN

November 7, 2025
6:30 p.m.

Box score

Purdue Fort Wayne Mastodons 68, Ohio State Buckeyes 94
Scoring by half: 30–45, 38–49
| Pts: Mikale Stevenson, 21; Rebs: 4 tied, 3 Asts: Mikale Stevenson, 3 | Pts: Bruce Thornton, 38; Rebs: Christoph Tilly, 6 Asts: Bruce Thornton, 5 |

Value City Arena, Columbus, OH
Attendance: 8,926
Referees: Andy O'Brien, Jason Phillips, Randy Richardson

=== vs Appalachian State ===
B1G+

November 11, 2025
6:30 p.m.

Box score

Appalachian State Mountaineers 53, Ohio State Buckeyes 75
Scoring by half: 25–30, 28–45
| Pts: Kasen Jennings, 12; Rebs: Luke Wilson, 7 Asts: Eren Banks, 3 | Pts: Brandon Noel, 17; Rebs: Brandon Noel, 11; Asts: Christoph Tilly, 4 |

Value City Arena, Columbus, OH
Attendance: 7,938
Referees: Gerald Williams, Edwin Young, Tim Comer

=== vs Notre Dame ===
FS1

November 16, 2025
12:30 p.m.

Box score

Notre Dame Fighting Irish 63, Ohio State Buckeyes 64
Scoring by half: 34–31, 29–33
| Pts: Markus Burton, 14; Rebs: Carson Towt, 12; Asts: Jalen Haralson, 3 | Pts: Bruce Thornton, 24; Rebs: Devin Royal, 6 Asts: 4 tied, 2 |

Value City Arena, Columbus, OH
Attendance: 12,357
Referees: Jeffrey Anderson, Paul Szelc, Brian Dorsey

=== vs Western Michigan ===
BTN

November 20, 2025
8:00 p.m.

Box score

Western Michigan Broncos 58, Ohio State Buckeyes 91
Scoring by half: 24–49, 34–42
| Pts: Brady Swartz, 20; Rebs: Brady Swartz, 9 Asts: EJ Ryans, 3 | Pts: Christoph Tilly, 17; Rebs: 2 tied, 10; Asts: Christoph Tilly, 7 |

Value City Arena, Columbus, OH
Attendance: 8,294
Referees: Anthony Burris, Chad Barlow, Kevin Brill

=== vs Mount St. Mary's ===
BTN

November 25, 2025
6:30 p.m.

Box score

Mount St. Mary's Mountaineers 60, Ohio State Buckeyes 113
Scoring by half: 26–52, 34–61
| Pts: Luke McEldon, 19; Rebs: Luke McEldon, 8 Asts: Mason So, 6 | Pts: John Mobley Jr., 26; Rebs: Brandon Noel, 7 Asts: Bruce Thornton, 5 |

Value City Arena, Columbus, OH
Attendance: 10,140
Referees: Brian McNutt, Tim Comer, Larry Scirotto

=== at Pittsburgh ===
ESPN2

November 28, 2025
7:00 p.m.

Box score

Ohio State Buckeyes 66, Pittsburgh Panthers 67
Scoring by half: 24–34, 42–33
| Pts: Devin Royal, 22; Rebs: Bruce Thornton, 13; Asts: Gabe Cupps, 3 | Pts: 3 tied, 18; Rebs: Cameron Corhen, 10; Asts: 2 tied, 2 |

Petersen Events Center, Pittsburgh, PA
Attendance: 6,299
Referees: Tommy Morrissey, Ron Groover, Roger Ayers

=== at Northwestern ===
BTN

December 6, 2025
2:00 p.m.

Box score

Ohio State Buckeyes 86, Northwestern Wildcats 82
Scoring by half: 40–44, 46–38
| Pts: Brandon Noel, 29; Rebs: Brandon Noel, 7 Asts: Bruce Thornton, 10 | Pts: Nick Martinelli, 32; Rebs: Arrinten Page, 9 Asts: Jayden Reid, 6 |

Welsh–Ryan Arena, Evanston, IL
Attendance: 5,448
Referees: Andy O'Brien, Randy Richardson, James Breeding

=== vs No. 13 Illinois ===
Peacock

December 9, 2025
7:30 p.m. EST

Box score

No. 13 Illinois Fighting Illini 88, Ohio State Buckeyes 80
Scoring by half: 48–42, 40–38
| Pts: Keaton Wagler, 23; Rebs: David Mirković, 9 Asts: Keaton Wagler, 5 | Pts: Bruce Thornton, 34; Rebs: Christoph Tilly, 8 Asts: Bruce Thornton, 6 |

Value City Arena • Columbus, Ohio
Attendance: 9,974
Referees: Tim Comer, Jeffrey Anderson, D.J. Carstensen

=== vs. West Virginia (Cleveland Hoops Showdown) ===
ESPNU

December 13, 2025
8:00 p.m. EST

Box score

Ohio State Buckeyes 89, West Virginia Mountaineers 88 (OT)
Scoring by half: 27–37, 41–31 Overtime: 9–9, 12–11
| Pts: Bruce Thornton, 23; Rebs: Devin Royal, 12; Asts: 2 tied, 4 | Pts: Honor Huff, 24; Rebs: Chance Moore, 8 Asts: 2 tied, 4 |

Rocket Arena • Cleveland, Ohio
Attendance: 6,465
Referees: Tommy Johnson, Michael Greenstein, Brian Dorsey

=== vs. No. 12 North Carolina (CBS Sports Classic) ===
CBS

December 20, 2025
3:00 p.m. EST

Box score

Ohio State Buckeyes 70, No. 12 North Carolina Tar Heels 71
Scoring by half: 31–34, 39–37
| Pts: Devin Royal, 18; Rebs: Christoph Tilly, 10; Asts: 2 tied, 4 | Pts: Caleb Wilson, 20; Rebs: Caleb Wilson, 15; Asts: Henri Veesaar, 5 |

State Farm Arena • Atlanta, Georgia
Attendance: 16,951
Referees: Doug Shows, Roger Ayers, Kelly Pfieffer

=== vs Grambling State ===
BTN

December 23, 2025
2:00 p.m. EST

Box score

Grambling State Tigers 63, Ohio State Buckeyes 89
Scoring by half: 24–39, 39–50
| Pts: Antonio Munoz, 19; Rebs: 2 tied, 4 Asts: Roderick Coffee III, 5 | Pts: John Mobley Jr., 20; Rebs: Amare Bynum, 9 Asts: John Mobley Jr., 4 |

Value City Arena • Columbus, Ohio
Attendance: 10,697
Referees: Michael Irving, D.J. Carstensen, Keith Kimble

=== at Rutgers ===
Peacock

January 2, 2026
8:00 p.m. EST

Box score

Ohio State Buckeyes 80, Rutgers Scarlet Knights 73
Scoring by half: 37–41, 43–32
| Pts: Bruce Thornton, 20; Rebs: Bruce Thornton, 10; Asts: John Mobley Jr., 5 | Pts: Tariq Francis, 17; Rebs: Emmanuel Ogbole, 9 Asts: 2 tied, 3 |

Jersey Mike's Arena • Piscataway, New Jersey
Attendance: 8,000
Referees: Michael Redd, Larry Scirotto, Brian Dorsey

=== vs No. 10 Nebraska ===
FS1

January 5, 2026
6:30 p.m. EST

Box score

No. 10 Nebraska Cornhuskers 72, Ohio State Buckeyes 69
Scoring by half: 38–31, 34–38
| Pts: Braden Frager, 15; Rebs: Sam Hoiberg, 9 Asts: Sam Hoiberg, 4 | Pts: John Mobley Jr., 22; Rebs: Amare Bynum, 9 Asts: Bruce Thornton, 7 |

Value City Arena • Columbus, Ohio
Attendance: 10,382
Referees: Ronald Groover, Kipp Kissinger, Keith Kimble

=== at Oregon ===
BTN

January 8, 2026
10:30 p.m. EST

Box score

Ohio State Buckeyes 72, Oregon Ducks 62
Scoring by half: 34–29, 38–33
| Pts: 2 tied, 14; Rebs: Devin Royal, 10; Asts: Devin Royal, 3 | Pts: Nate Bittle, 14; Rebs: Nate Bittle, 9 Asts: Wei Lin, 5 |

Matthew Knight Arena • Eugene, Oregon
Attendance: 6,037
Referees: Andy O'Brien, Jason Phillips, Randy Richardson

=== at Washington ===
Peacock

January 11, 2026
6:00 p.m. EST

Box score

Ohio State Buckeyes 74, Washington Huskies 81
Scoring by half: 38–36, 36–45
| Pts: Bruce Thornton, 28; Rebs: Devin Royal, 8 Asts: John Mobley Jr., 4 | Pts: Zoom Diallo, 22; Rebs: Hannes Steinbach, 9 Asts: Jj Mandaquit, 5 |

Hec Edmundson Pavilion • Seattle, Washington
Attendance: 8,163
Referees: Nate Harris, Brian Dorsey, Paul Szelc

=== vs UCLA ===
CBS

January 17, 2026
1:00 p.m. EST

Box score

UCLA Bruins 74, Ohio State Buckeyes 86
Scoring by half: 36–42, 38–44
| Pts: Tyler Bilodeau, 30; Rebs: Tyler Bilodeau, 8 Asts: Donovan Dent, 7 | Pts: John Mobley Jr., 28; Rebs: Devin Royal, 9 Asts: Christoph Tilly, 5 |

Value City Arena • Columbus, Ohio
Attendance: 12,937
Referees: Alfred Smith, Mike Littlewood, Kelly Pfeifer

=== vs Minnesota ===
BTN

January 20, 2026
6:30 p.m. EST

Box score

Minnesota Golden Gophers 74, Ohio State Buckeyes 82 (OT)
Scoring by half: 28–31, 39–36 Overtime: 7–15
| Pts: Jaylen Crocker-Johnson, 26; Rebs: 2 tied, 8 Asts: 2 tied, 5 | Pts: John Mobley Jr., 26; Rebs: Ivan Njegovan, 9 Asts: Bruce Thornton, 3 |

Value City Arena • Columbus, Ohio
Attendance: 8,750
Referees: Randy Richardson, Verne Harris, Paul Szelc

=== at No. 3 Michigan (rivalry) ===
FOX

January 23, 2026
8:00 p.m. EST

Box score

Ohio State Buckeyes 62, No. 3 Michigan Wolverines 74
Scoring by half: 30–33, 32–41
| Pts: John Mobley Jr., 22; Rebs: Bruce Thornton, 9 Asts: 3 tied, 2 | Pts: Yaxel Lendeborg, 18; Rebs: Yaxel Lendeborg, 9 Asts: Elliot Cadeau, 8 |

Crisler Center • Ann Arbor, Michigan
Attendance: 12,707
Referees: D.J. Carstensen, Doug Sirmons, Keith Kimble

=== vs Penn State ===
FS1

January 26, 2026
7:00 p.m. EST

Box score

Penn State Nittany Lions 78, Ohio State Buckeyes 84
Scoring by half: 32–50, 46–34
| Pts: Eli Rice, 20; Rebs: Ivan Juric, 14; Asts: Kayden Mingo, 8 | Pts: John Mobley Jr., 25; Rebs: Amare Bynum, 5 Asts: 2 tied, 5 |

Value City Arena • Columbus, Ohio
Attendance: 10,358
Referees: Bert Smith, Jeffrey Anderson, Brian Dorsey

=== at Wisconsin ===
FOX

January 31, 2026
2:00 p.m. EST

Box score

Ohio State Buckeyes 82, Wisconsin Badgers 92
Scoring by half: 43–49, 39–43
| Pts: 2 tied, 18; Rebs: Amare Bynum, 7 Asts: 2 tied, 2 | Pts: John Blackwell, 22; Rebs: Nolan Winter, 11; Asts: 2 tied, 4 |

Kohl Center • Madison, Wisconsin
Attendance: 16,838
Referees: D.J. Carstensen, Michael Irving, Earl Watson

=== at Maryland ===
FS1

February 5, 2026
8:30 p.m. EST

Box score

Ohio State Buckeyes 82, Maryland Terrapins 62
Scoring by half: 42–30, 40–32
| Pts: Christoph Tilly, 19; Rebs: 5 tied, 3 Asts: 2 tied, 4 | Pts: Elijah Saunders, 20; Rebs: Solomon Washington, 8 Asts: 3 tied, 2 |

Xfinity Center • College Park, Maryland
Attendance: 12,358
Referees: Bart Lenox, James Breeding, Brian Dorsey

=== vs Michigan (rivalry) ===
CBS

February 8, 2026
1:00 p.m. EST

Michigan Wolverines 0, Ohio State Buckeyes 0
Scoring by half: 0–0, 0–0

Value City Arena • Columbus, Ohio

=== vs USC ===
BTN

February 11, 2026
6:30 p.m. EST

USC Trojans 0, Ohio State Buckeyes 0
Scoring by half: 0–0, 0–0

Value City Arena • Columbus, Ohio

=== vs. Virginia (Nashville Hoops Showdown) ===
FOX

February 14, 2026
8:00 p.m. EST

Virginia Cavaliers 0, Ohio State Buckeyes 0
Scoring by half: 0–0, 0–0

Value City Arena • Columbus, Ohio

=== vs Wisconsin ===
FS1

February 17, 2026
8:30 p.m. EST

Wisconsin Badgers 0, Ohio State Buckeyes 0
Scoring by half: 0–0, 0–0

Value City Arena • Columbus, Ohio

=== at Michigan State ===
CBS

February 22, 2026
1:00 p.m. EST

Ohio State Buckeyes 0, Michigan State Spartans 0
Scoring by half: 0–0, 0–0

Breslin Student Events Center • East Lansing, Michigan

=== at Iowa ===
BTN

February 25, 2026
9:00 p.m. EST

Ohio State Buckeyes 0, Iowa Hawkeyes 0
Scoring by half: 0–0, 0–0

Carver–Hawkeye Arena • Iowa City, Iowa

=== vs Purdue ===
CBS

March 1, 2026
1:30 p.m. EST

Purdue Boilermakers 0, Ohio State Buckeyes 0
Scoring by half: 0–0, 0–0

Value City Arena • Columbus, Ohio

=== at Penn State ===
Peacock

March 4, 2026
7:30 p.m. EST

Ohio State Buckeyes 0, Penn State Nittany Lions 0
Scoring by half: 0–0, 0–0

Bryce Jordan Center • State College, Pennsylvania

=== vs Indiana ===
FOX

March 7, 2026
5:30 p.m. EST

Indiana Hoosiers 0, Ohio State Buckeyes 0
Scoring by half: 0–0, 0–0

Value City Arena • Columbus, Ohio

== Rankings ==
Ranking movements Legend: ██ Increase in ranking ██ Decrease in ranking — = Not ranked RV = Received votes
| | Week | | | | | | | | | | | | | | | | | | | | |
| Poll | Pre | 1 | 2 | 3 | 4 | 5 | 6 | 7 | 8 | 9 | 10 | 11 | 12 | 13 | 14 | 15 | 16 | 17 | 18 | 19 | Final |
|---|---|---|---|---|---|---|---|---|---|---|---|---|---|---|---|---|---|---|---|---|---|
| AP | RV | RV | RV | RV | — | — | — | — | —* | — | — | — | — | — | — | — | — | RV | RV | RV | RV |
| Coaches | RV | RV | RV | RV | — | RV | RV | — | — | — | RV | — | — | — | — | — | — | — | RV | RV | — |

*AP did not release a week 8 poll.

== See also ==
- 2025–26 Ohio State Buckeyes women's basketball team
