= 2024–25 Ohio State Buckeyes men's basketball team =

American college basketball season

2024–25 Ohio State Buckeyes men's basketball
- Conference: Big Ten Conference
- Record: 17–15 (9–11 Big Ten)
- Head coach: Jake Diebler (1st season)
- Associate head coach: Joel Justus (1st season)
- Assistant coaches: Dave Dickerson (1st, 9th overall season); Jamall Walker (1st season); Talor Battle (1st season); Luke Simons (1st season)
- Home arena: Value City Arena

2024–25 Big Ten Conference men's basketball standings
	Conf.				Overall
Team	W		L	PCT	W		L	PCT
No. 7 Michigan State	17	–	3	.850	30	–	7	.811
No. 9 Maryland	14	–	6	.700	27	–	9	.750
No. 10 Michigan †	14	–	6	.700	27	–	10	.730
UCLA	13	–	7	.650	23	–	11	.676
No. 16 Wisconsin	13	–	7	.650	27	–	10	.730
No. 14 Purdue	13	–	7	.650	24	–	12	.667
Illinois	12	–	8	.600	22	–	13	.629
Oregon	12	–	8	.600	25	–	10	.714
Indiana	10	–	10	.500	19	–	13	.594
Ohio State	9	–	11	.450	17	–	15	.531
Rutgers	8	–	12	.400	15	–	17	.469
Minnesota	7	–	13	.350	15	–	17	.469
Northwestern	7	–	13	.350	17	–	16	.515
USC	7	–	13	.350	17	–	18	.486
Iowa	7	–	13	.350	17	–	16	.515
Nebraska	7	–	13	.350	21	–	14	.600
Penn State	6	–	14	.300	16	–	15	.516
Washington	4	–	16	.200	13	–	18	.419
† 2025 Big Ten tournament winner Rankings from AP poll

The 2024–25 Ohio State Buckeyes men's basketball team represented the Ohio State University during the 2024–25 NCAA Division I men's basketball season. They were led by first-year head coach Jake Diebler, and played their home games at Value City Arena in Columbus, Ohio, as a member of the Big Ten Conference. The team was selected to the College Basketball Crown, but declined the invite.

== Previous season ==
The Buckeyes finished the 2023–24 season 22–14, 9–11 in Big Ten play to finish in a three-way tie for tenth place. As the No. 10 seed in the Big Ten tournament, they beat Iowa in the first round, before losing to Illinois in the quarterfinals. The Buckeyes automatically qualified for the National Invitation Tournament as the No. 2 seed where they defeated Cornell in the first round and Virginia Tech in the second round, before losing to Georgia in the quarterfinal.

== Offseason ==
=== Departures ===
Ohio State departures
Name	Number	Pos.	Height	Weight	Year	Hometown	Reason for departure
Scotty Middleton	0	G	6'7"	190	Freshman	Miami, FL	Transferred to Seton Hall
Roddy Gayle Jr.	1	G	6'4"	210	Sophomore	Niagara Falls, NY	Transferred to Michigan
Dale Bonner	4	G	6'2"	175	GS Senior	Shaker Heights, OH	Graduated
Jamison Battle	10	F	6'7"	220	GS Senior	Robbinsdale, MN	Graduated
Bowen Hardman	15	G	6'3"	190	Sophomore	Cincinnati, OH	Transferred to Akron
Zed Key	23	F	6'8"	245	Senior	Bay Shore, NY	Transferred to Dayton
Felix Okpara	34	C	6'11"	235	Sophomore	Lagos, Nigeria	Transferred to Tennessee
Owen Spencer	44	F	6'9"	230	Senior	Cincinnati, OH	Walk-on; graduated

=== Incoming transfers ===
Ohio State incoming transfers
Name	Number	Pos.	Height	Weight	Year	Hometown	Previous school
Meechie Johnson	1	G	6'2"	185	Senior	Cleveland, OH	South Carolina
Aaron Bradshaw	4	F	7'1"	215	Sophomore	Rahway, NJ	Kentucky
Ques Glover	6	G	6'0"	185	GS Senior	Knoxville, TN	Kansas State
Micah Parrish	8	G	6'6"	205	GS Senior	Detroit, MI	San Diego State
Sean Stewart	13	F	6'9"	220	Sophomore	Windermere, FL	Duke

=== Recruiting classes ===
==== 2024 recruiting class ====
College recruiting information
Name	Hometown	School	Height	Weight	Commit date
John Mobley Jr. CG	Mount Pleasant, Utah	Wasatch Academy	6 ft 2 in (1.88 m)	185 lb (84 kg)	Oct 17, 2022
John Mobley Jr. CG	Recruit ratings: Rivals: 247Sports: ESPN: (88)				
Colin White; SF	Ottawa, Ohio	Ottawa-Glandorf High School	6 ft 6 in (1.98 m)	180 lb (82 kg)	Aug 13, 2023
Colin White; SF	Recruit ratings: Rivals: 247Sports: ESPN: (80)				
Ivan Njegovan; C	Croatia	KK Bosco	7 ft 1 in (2.16 m)	N/A	Jul 30, 2024
Ivan Njegovan; C	Recruit ratings: Rivals: 247Sports: ESPN: (N/A)				
Overall recruit ranking: Rivals: 45 247Sports: 32 ESPN: —
Note: In many cases, Scout, Rivals, 247Sports, On3, and ESPN may conflict in their listings of height and weight.; In these cases, the average was taken. ESPN grades are on a 100-point scale.; Sources: "Ohio State 2024 Basketball Commitments". Rivals.; "2024 Ohio State Buckeyes Recruiting Class". ESPN.; "2024 Team Ranking". Rivals.

==== 2025 recruiting class ====
College recruiting information (2025)
Name	Hometown	School	Height	Weight	Commit date
Dorian Jones; SG	Cleveland, Ohio	Richmond Heights High School	6 ft 4 in (1.93 m)	160 lb (73 kg)	Jul 1, 2024
Dorian Jones; SG	Recruit ratings: Rivals: 247Sports: ESPN: (82)				
A'mare Bynum; C	Omaha, Nebraska	Link Academy	6 ft 8 in (2.03 m)	210 lb (95 kg)	Oct 22, 2024
A'mare Bynum; C	Recruit ratings: Rivals: 247Sports: ESPN: (81)				
Overall recruit ranking: Rivals: 29 247Sports: 32 ESPN: —
Note: In many cases, Scout, Rivals, 247Sports, On3, and ESPN may conflict in their listings of height and weight.; In these cases, the average was taken. ESPN grades are on a 100-point scale.; Sources: "Ohio State 2025 Basketball Commitments". Rivals.; "2025 Ohio State Buckeyes Recruiting Class". ESPN.; "2025 Team Ranking". Rivals.

== Roster ==
2024–25 Ohio State Buckeyes men's basketball team
Players
Coaches

Pos.	#	Name	Height	Weight	Year	Previous school	Hometown
G	0	John Mobley Jr.	6 ft 1 in (1.85 m)	175 lb (79 kg)	Fr	Wasatch Academy	Reynoldsburg, OH
G	1	Meechie Johnson	6 ft 2 in (1.88 m)	185 lb (84 kg)	Sr	South Carolina	Cleveland, OH
G	2	Bruce Thornton	6 ft 2 in (1.88 m)	215 lb (98 kg)	Jr	Milton HS	Fairburn, GA
G	3	Taison Chatman (injured)	6 ft 4 in (1.93 m)	175 lb (79 kg)	So	Totino-Grace HS	Minneapolis, MN
F	4	Aaron Bradshaw	7 ft 1 in (2.16 m)	215 lb (98 kg)	So	Kentucky	Rahway, NJ
G	6	Ques Glover	6 ft 0 in (1.83 m)	185 lb (84 kg)	GS	Kansas State	Knoxville, TN
G	8	Micah Parrish	6 ft 6 in (1.98 m)	205 lb (93 kg)	GS	San Diego State	Detroit, MI
G	10	Colby Baumann (W)	6 ft 3 in (1.91 m)	185 lb (84 kg)	Jr	IMG Academy	Houston, TX
G	12	Evan Mahaffey	6 ft 6 in (1.98 m)	200 lb (91 kg)	Jr	Penn State	Cincinnati, OH
F	13	Sean Stewart	6 ft 9 in (2.06 m)	220 lb (100 kg)	So	Duke	Windermere, FL
G	14	Braylen Nash (W)	6 ft 4 in (1.93 m)	180 lb (82 kg)	Fr	New Albany HS	New Albany, OH
C	17	Ivan Njegovan	7 ft 1 in (2.16 m)	250 lb (113 kg)	Fr	Gimnazija Vladimira-Nazora	Otočac, Croatia
F	20	Colin White	6 ft 6 in (1.98 m)	205 lb (93 kg)	Fr	Ottawa-Glandorf HS	Ottawa, OH
F	21	Devin Royal	6 ft 6 in (1.98 m)	220 lb (100 kg)	So	Pickerington HS Central	Pickerington, OH
F	24	Kalen Etzler	6 ft 8 in (2.03 m)	185 lb (84 kg)	RS Jr	Crestview HS	Van Wert, OH
C	25	Austin Parks	6 ft 10 in (2.08 m)	260 lb (118 kg)	So	Memorial HS	St. Marys, OH

Head coach

- Jake Diebler (Valparaiso)

Assistant coach(es)

- Joel Justus (UNC Wilmington)
- Dave Dickerson (Maryland)
- Jamall Walker (Saint Louis)
- Talor Battle (Penn State)
- Luke Simons (Purdue)

Legend

- (C) Team captain
- (S) Suspended
- (I) Ineligible
- (W) Walk-on
- Injured
- Current redshirt

Roster

=== Depth chart ===
Pos.	Starting 5	Bench 1	Bench 2	Bench 3
C	Aaron Bradshaw	Austin Parks	Ivan Njegovan
PF	Devin Royal	Sean Stewart	Kalen Etzler
SF	Micah Parrish	Colin White
SG	John Mobley Jr.	Evan Mahaffey	Colby Baumann	Taison Chatman (injured)
PG	Bruce Thornton	Ques Glover	Braylen Nash	Meechie Johnson

== Schedule and results ==
Date time, TV	Rank^{#}	Opponent^{#}	Result	Record	High points	High rebounds	High assists	Site (attendance) city, state
Exhibition
October 18, 2024*; 7:00 p.m.		at No. 20 Cincinnati; CareSource Exhibition Game for Mental Health	L 62–80	0–0	11 – 2 tied	6 – Royal	2 – 3 tied	Fifth Third Arena; Cincinnati, OH
Regular season
November 4, 2024*; 10:00 p.m., TNT/TruTV		vs. No. 19 Texas; Hall of Fame Series	W 80–72	1–0	20 – Thornton	8 – Mahaffey	5 – 2 tied	T-Mobile Arena (6,397); Paradise, NV
November 11, 2024*; 6:00 p.m., BTN	No. 21	Youngstown State	W 81–47	2–0	16 – 2 tied	8 – Bradshaw	3 – 3 tied	Value City Arena (10,797); Columbus, OH
November 15, 2024*; 9:00 p.m., SECN	No. 21	at No. 23 Texas A&M	L 64–78	2–1	15 – Thornton	9 – Royal	4 – Thornton	Reed Arena (11,658); College Station, TX
November 19, 2024*; 7:00 p.m., B1G+		Evansville; Ohio State MTE	W 80–30	3–1	20 – Royal	12 – Royal	7 – Thornton	Value City Arena (9,824); Columbus, OH
November 22, 2024*; 6:00 p.m., BTN		Campbell; Ohio State MTE	W 104–60	4–1	23 – Mobley Jr.	9 – Parrish	7 – Thornton	Value City Arena (10,557); Columbus, OH
November 25, 2024*; 7:00 p.m., BTN		Green Bay; Ohio State MTE	W 102–69	5–1	25 – Thornton	11 – Royal	9 – Thornton	Value City Arena (10,123); Columbus, OH
November 29, 2024*; 2:30 p.m., Peacock		Pittsburgh	L 90–91 ^{OT}	5–2	24 – Thornton	7 – Parrish	9 – Thornton	Value City Arena (13,064); Columbus, OH
December 4, 2024; 6:30 p.m., BTN		at Maryland	L 59–83	5–3 (0–1)	18 – Royal	9 – Royal	3 – Johnson	Xfinity Center (13,793); College Park, MD
December 7, 2024; 12:00 p.m., FS1		Rutgers	W 80–66	6–3 (1–1)	22 – 2 tied	7 – Stewart	4 – Johnson	Value City Arena (10,477); Columbus, OH
December 14, 2024*; 1:00 p.m., ESPN2		vs. No. 2 Auburn; Holiday Hoopsgiving	L 53–91	6–4	14 – Royal	6 – Stewart	2 – 2 tied	State Farm Arena (12,900); Atlanta, GA
December 17, 2024*; 8:00 p.m., Peacock		Valparaiso	W 95–73	7–4	31 – Royal	15 – Royal	6 – Thornton	Value City Arena (8,079); Columbus, OH
December 21, 2024*; 5:30 p.m., CBS		vs. No. 4 Kentucky; CBS Sports Classic	W 85–65	8–4	30 – Thornton	6 – Royal	3 – 2 tied	Madison Square Garden (19,812); New York City, NY
December 29, 2024*; 12:00 p.m., BTN		Indiana State	W 103–83	9–4	33 – Thornton	8 – Stewart	5 – Glover	Value City Arena (14,388); Columbus, OH
January 3, 2025; 8:00 p.m., FOX		No. 18 Michigan State	L 62–69	9–5 (1–2)	13 – Parrish	8 – Stewart	2 – 3 tied	Value City Arena (13,604); Columbus, OH
January 6, 2025; 9:00 p.m., FS1		at Minnesota	W 89–88 ^{2OT}	10–5 (2–2)	19 – Royal	9 – Royal	4 – Mobley Jr.	Williams Arena (7,611); Minneapolis, MN
January 9, 2025; 6:00 p.m., BTN		No. 15 Oregon	L 71–73	10–6 (2–3)	20 – Thornton	9 – 2 tied	3 – 3 tied	Value City Arena (10,631); Columbus, OH
January 14, 2025; 9:00 p.m., Peacock		at No. 24 Wisconsin	L 68–70	10–7 (2–4)	21 – Thornton	8 – Stewart	3 – Thornton	Kohl Center (14,527); Madison, WI
January 17, 2025; 8:00 p.m., FOX		Indiana	L 76–77 ^{OT}	10–8 (2–5)	22 – Mobley Jr.	6 – 2 tied	3 – 2 tied	Value City Arena (13,124); Columbus, OH
January 21, 2025; 7:30 p.m., Peacock		at No. 11 Purdue	W 73–70	11–8 (3–5)	22 – Parrish	7 – Parrish	5 – Thornton	Mackey Arena (14,876); West Lafayette, IN
January 27, 2025; 8:00 p.m., FS1		Iowa	W 82–65	12–8 (4–5)	18 – Parrish	8 – 2 tied	8 – Mobley Jr.	Value City Arena (11,261); Columbus, OH
January 30, 2025; 6:30 p.m., FS1		at Penn State	W 83–64	13–8 (5–5)	19 – Mobley Jr.	8 – Royal	8 – Mobley Jr.	Rec Hall (6,198); State College, PA
February 2, 2025; 1:00 p.m., CBS		at No. 18 Illinois	L 79–87	13–9 (5–6)	29 – Royal	8 – Thornton	5 – Thornton	State Farm Center (15,544); Champaign, IL
February 6, 2025; 7:00 p.m., FS1		No. 18 Maryland	W 73–70	14–9 (6–6)	31 – Thornton	11 – Royal	6 – Thornton	Value City Arena (10,155); Columbus, OH
February 9, 2025; 2:00 p.m., BTN		at Nebraska	L 71–79	14–10 (6–7)	30 – Parrish	5 – Mahaffey	5 – Thornton	Pinnacle Bank Arena (15,633); Lincoln, NE
February 12, 2025; 8:30 p.m., BTN		Washington	W 93–69	15–10 (7–7)	21 – 2 tied	7 – 2 tied	5 – Thornton	Value City Arena (9,987); Columbus, OH
February 16, 2025; 1:00 p.m., CBS		No. 20 Michigan; Rivalry	L 83–86	15–11 (7–8)	26 – Royal	10 – Stewart	6 – Thornton	Value City Arena (18,058); Columbus, OH
February 20, 2025; 6:30 p.m., FS1		Northwestern	L 49–70	15–12 (7–9)	12 – Parrish	8 – Stewart	4 – Thornton	Value City Arena (12,684); Columbus, OH
February 23, 2025; 3:45 p.m., CBS		at UCLA	L 61–69	15–13 (7–10)	21 – Thornton	7 – Parrish	3 – Thornton	Pauley Pavilion (9,015); Los Angeles, CA
February 26, 2025; 10:30 p.m., BTN		at USC	W 87–82	16–13 (8–10)	20 – 2 tied	5 – Royal	5 – Thornton	Galen Center (5,720); Los Angeles, CA
March 4, 2025; 9:00 p.m., Peacock		Nebraska	W 116–114 ^{2OT}	17–13 (9–10)	29 – Thornton	8 – Royal	9 – Thornton	Value City Arena (10,021); Columbus, OH
March 8, 2025; 3:45 p.m., CBS		at Indiana	L 60–66	17–14 (9–11)	19 – Parrish	7 – 2 tied	4 – 2 tied	Simon Skjodt Assembly Hall (17,222); Bloomington, IN
Big Ten Tournament
March 12, 2025; 6:00 p.m., Peacock	(10)	vs. (15) Iowa; First round	L 70–77	17–15	24 – Thornton	6 – 2 tied	9 – Thornton	Gainbridge Fieldhouse (12,922); Indianapolis, IN
*Non-conference game. ^{#}Rankings from AP Poll. (#) Tournament seedings in parentheses. All times are in Eastern Time.

== Exhibition ==
=== at No. 20 Cincinnati (CareSource Exhibition Game for Mental Health) ===
October 18, 2024
7:00 p.m. EDT

Recap

Ohio State Buckeyes 62, No. 20 Cincinnati Bearcats 80
Scoring by half: 31–41, 31–39
Pts: 2 tied, 11; Rebs: Devin Royal, 6 Asts: 2 tied, 2	Pts: 2 tied, 12; Rebs: Dillon Mitchell, 7 Asts: Day Day Thomas, 6

Fifth Third Arena • Cincinnati, Ohio
Referees: Doug Sirmons

== Game summaries ==
=== vs. No. 19 Texas (Hall of Fame Series) ===
TNT
TruTV

November 4, 2024
10:00 p.m. EST

Box score

Ohio State Buckeyes 80, No. 19 Texas Longhorns 72
Scoring by half: 38–31, 42–41
Pts: Bruce Thornton, 20; Rebs: Evan Mahaffey, 8 Asts: 2 tied, 5	Pts: Tre Johnson, 29; Rebs: Chendall Weaver, 8 Asts: Julian Larry, 5

T-Mobile Arena • Paradise, Nevada
Attendance: 6,397
Referees: Don Daly, Courtney Green, Keith Kimble

=== vs Youngstown State ===
BTN

November 11, 2024
6:00 p.m. EST

Box score

Youngstown State Penguins 47, No. 21 Ohio State Buckeyes 81
Scoring by half: 22–37, 25–44
Pts: Cris Carroll, 10; Rebs: Cris Carroll, 7 Asts: Juwan Maxey, 3	Pts: 2 tied, 16; Rebs: Aaron Bradshaw, 8 Asts: 3 tied, 3

Value City Arena • Columbus, Ohio
Attendance: 10,797
Referees: Jason Phillips, Michael Reed, Jeffrey Anderson

=== at No. 23 Texas A&M ===
SECN

November 15, 2024
9:00 p.m. EST

Box score

No. 21 Ohio State Buckeyes 64, No. 23 Texas A&M Aggies 78
Scoring by half: 22–31, 42–47
Pts: Bruce Thornton, 15; Rebs: Devin Royal, 9 Asts: Bruce Thornton, 6	Pts: 2 tied, 15; Rebs: Solomon Washington, 8 Asts: Zhuric Phelps, 3

Reed Arena • College Station, Texas
Attendance: 11,658
Referees: Chuck Jones, Owen Shortt, Joe Lindsay

=== vs Evansville (Ohio State MTE) ===
B1G+

November 19, 2024
7:00 p.m. EST

Box score

Evansville Purple Aces 30, Ohio State Buckeyes 80
Scoring by half: 14–28, 16–52
Pts: Gabriel Pozzato, 8 Rebs: 2 tied, 6 Asts: 3 tied, 1	Pts: Devin Royal, 20; Rebs: Devin Royal, 12; Asts: Bruce Thornton, 7

Value City Arena • Columbus, Ohio
Attendance: 9,824
Referees: Anthony Burris, Randy Richardson, DJ Carstensen

=== vs Campbell (Ohio State MTE) ===
BTN

November 22, 2024
6:00 p.m. EST

Box score

Campbell Fighting Camels 60, Ohio State Buckeyes 104
Scoring by half: 27–53, 33–51
Pts: Bragi Guðmundsson, 12; Rebs: Nolan Dorsey, 8 Asts: Terren Frank, 2	Pts: John Mobley Jr., 23; Rebs: Micah Parrish, 9 Asts: Bruce Thornton, 7

Value City Arena • Columbus, Ohio
Attendance: 10,557
Referees: Edwin Young, Rob Riley, Paul Szelc

=== vs Green Bay (Ohio State MTE) ===
BTN

November 25, 2024
7:00 p.m. EST

Box score

Green Bay Phoenix 69, Ohio State Buckeyes 102
Scoring by half: 32–42, 37–60
Pts: Anthony Roy, 30; Rebs: Mac Wrecke, 5 Asts: Ben Tweedy, 5	Pts: Bruce Thornton, 25; Rebs: Devin Royal, 11; Asts: Bruce Thornton, 9

Value City Arena • Columbus, Ohio
Attendance: 10,123
Referees: Jourdan Love, Nate Harris, Keith Kimble

=== vs Pittsburgh ===
Peacock

November 29, 2024
2:30 p.m. EST

Box score

Pittsburgh Panthers 91, Ohio State Buckeyes 90 (OT)
Scoring by half: 39–48, 38–29 Overtime: 14–13
Pts: Jaland Lowe, 28; Rebs: Ishmael Leggett, 10; Asts: 2 tied, 4	Pts: Bruce Thornton, 24; Rebs: Micah Parrish, 7 Asts: Bruce Thornton, 9

Value City Arena • Columbus, Ohio
Attendance: 13,064
Referees: Tim Comer, Brian Dorsey, Earl Walton

=== at Maryland ===
BTN

December 4, 2024
6:30 p.m. EST

Box score

Ohio State Buckeyes 59, Maryland Terrapins 83
Scoring by half: 17–50, 42–33
Pts: Devin Royal, 18; Rebs: Devin Royal, 9 Asts: Meechie Johnson, 3	Pts: Ja'Kobi Gillespie, 23; Rebs: Derik Queen, 11; Asts: Ja'Kobi Gillespie, 4

Xfinity Center • College Park, Maryland
Attendance: 13,793
Referees: John Floyd, Jason Phillips, D.J. Carstensen

=== vs Rutgers ===
FS1

December 7, 2024
12:00 p.m. EST

Box score

Rutgers Scarlet Knights 66, Ohio State Buckeyes 80
Scoring by half: 31–39, 35–41
Pts: Dylan Harper, 18; Rebs: Ace Bailey, 7 Asts: Dylan Harper, 4	Pts: 2 tied, 22; Rebs: Sean Stewart, 7 Asts: Meechie Johnson, 4

Value City Arena • Columbus, Ohio
Attendance: 10,477
Referees: Doug Sirmons, Michael Reed, Jeffrey Anderson

=== vs. No. 2 Auburn (Holiday Hoopsgiving) ===
ESPN2

December 14, 2024
1:00 p.m. EST

Box score

Ohio State Buckeyes 53, No. 2 Auburn Tigers 91
Scoring by half: 21–49, 32–42
Pts: Devin Royal, 14; Rebs: Sean Stewart, 6 Asts: 2 tied, 2	Pts: Johni Broome, 21; Rebs: Johni Broome, 20; Asts: Johni Broome, 6

State Farm Arena • Atlanta, Georgia
Attendance: 12,900
Referees: Owen Shortt, Byron Jarrett, Terry Oglesby

=== vs Valparaiso ===
Peacock

December 17, 2024
8:00 p.m. EST

Box score

Valparaiso Beacons 73, Ohio State Buckeyes 95
Scoring by half: 30–41, 43–54
Pts: All Wright, 22; Rebs: Cooper Schwieger, 8 Asts: All Wright, 3	Pts: Devin Royal, 31; Rebs: Devin Royal, 15; Asts: Bruce Thornton, 6

Value City Arena • Columbus, Ohio
Attendance: 8,079
Referees: Rob Riley Sr., Earl Walton, Brian Dorsey

=== vs. No. 4 Kentucky (CBS Sports Classic) ===
CBS

December 21, 2024
5:30 p.m. EST

Box score

Ohio State Buckeyes 85, No. 4 Kentucky Wildcats 65
Scoring by half: 39–30, 46–35
Pts: Bruce Thornton, 30; Rebs: Devin Royal, 6 Asts: 2 tied, 3	Pts: Otega Oweh, 21; Rebs: Amari Williams, 8 Asts: Lamont Butler, 5

Madison Square Garden • New York City, New York
Attendance: 19,812
Referees: Patrick Evans, Doug Shows, Brian Dorsey

=== vs Indiana State ===
BTN

December 29, 2024
12:00 p.m. EST

Box score

Indiana State Sycamores 83, Ohio State Buckeyes 103
Scoring by half: 47–52, 36–51
Pts: Jaden Daughtry, 25; Rebs: Josiah LeGree, 6 Asts: Samage Teel, 5	Pts: Bruce Thornton, 33; Rebs: Sean Stewart, 8 Asts: Ques Glover, 5

Value City Arena • Columbus, Ohio
Attendance: 14,388
Referees: Steve Honacki, Earl Walton, Paul Szelc

=== vs No. 18 Michigan State ===
FOX

January 3, 2024
8:00 p.m. EST

Box score

No. 18 Michigan State Spartans 69, Ohio State Buckeyes 62
Scoring by half: 37–29, 32–33
Pts: Szymon Zapala, 15; Rebs: Jaxon Kohler, 10; Asts: Jeremy Fears Jr., 7	Pts: Micah Parrish, 13; Rebs: Sean Stewart, 8 Asts: 3 tied, 2

Value City Arena • Columbus, Ohio
Attendance: 13,604
Referees: Nate Harris, Michael Irving, Tim Comer

=== at Minnesota ===
FS1

January 6, 2024
9:00 p.m. EST

Box score

Ohio State Buckeyes 89, Minnesota Golden Gophers 88 (OT)
Scoring by half: 27–28, 37–36 Overtime: 9–9, 16–15
Pts: Devin Royal, 19; Rebs: Devin Royal, 9 Asts: John Mobley Jr., 4	Pts: Parker Fox, 21; Rebs: 2 tied, 6 Asts: 2 tied, 4

Williams Arena • Minneapolis, Minnesota
Attendance: 7,611
Referees: Bill Ek, D.J. Carstensen, Paul Szelc

=== vs No. 15 Oregon ===
BTN

January 9, 2024
6:00 p.m. EST

Box score

No. 15 Oregon Ducks 73, Ohio State Buckeyes 71
Scoring by half: 27–32, 46–39
Pts: Jackson Shelstad, 24; Rebs: Nathan Bittle, 8 Asts: Jackson Shelstad, 3	Pts: Bruce Thornton, 20; Rebs: 2 tied, 9 Asts: 2 tied, 3

Value City Arena • Columbus, Ohio
Attendance: 10,631
Referees: John Floyd, Doug Sirmons, Jeffrey Anderson

=== at No. 24 Wisconsin ===
Peacock

January 14, 2024
9:00 p.m. EST

Box score

Ohio State Buckeyes 68, No. 24 Wisconsin Badgers 70
Scoring by half: 20–37, 48–33
Pts: Bruce Thornton, 21; Rebs: Sean Stewart, 8 Asts: Bruce Thornton, 3	Pts: John Tonje, 17; Rebs: Steven Crowl, 7 Asts: John Blackwell, 2

Kohl Center • Madison, Wisconsin
Attendance: 14,527
Referees: Kelly Pfeifer, Earl Walton, Keith Kimble

=== vs Indiana ===
FOX

January 17, 2025
8:00 p.m. EST

Box score

Indiana Hoosiers 77, Ohio State Buckeyes 76 (OT)
Scoring by half: 29–35, 42–36 Overtime: 6–5
Pts: Luke Goode, 23; Rebs: Oumar Ballo, 15; Asts: Trey Galloway, 6	Pts: John Mobley Jr., 22; Rebs: 3 tied, 6 Asts: 2 tied, 3

Value City Arena • Columbus, Ohio
Attendance: 13,124
Referees: Mike Littlewood, Michael Irving, Jason Phillips

=== at No. 11 Purdue ===
Peacock

January 21, 2025
7:30 p.m. EST

Box score

Ohio State Buckeyes 73, No. 11 Purdue Boilermakers 70
Scoring by half: 28–41, 45–29
Pts: Micah Parrish, 22; Rebs: Micah Parrish, 7 Asts: Bruce Thornton, 5	Pts: Trey Kaufman-Renn, 26; Rebs: Trey Kaufman-Renn, 7 Asts: Braden Smith, 8

Mackey Arena • West Lafayette, Indiana
Attendance: 14,876
Referees: Thomas Nunez, Tim Comer, Jeff Anderson

=== vs Iowa ===
FS1

January 27, 2025
8:00 p.m. EST

Box score

Iowa Hawkeyes 65, Ohio State Buckeyes 82
Scoring by half: 26–30, 39–52
Pts: Drew Thelwell, 20; Rebs: Owen Freeman, 8 Asts: 2 tied, 3	Pts: Micah Parrish, 18; Rebs: Devin Royal, 9 Asts: John Mobley Jr., 8

Value City Arena • Columbus, Ohio
Attendance: 11,261
Referees: Bert Smith, Terry Oglesby, Verne Harris

=== at Penn State ===
FS1

January 30, 2025
6:30 p.m. EST

Box score

Ohio State Buckeyes 83, Penn State Nittany Lions 64
Scoring by half: 43–33, 40–31
Pts: Yanic Konan Niederhäuser, 21; Rebs: 2 tied, 5 Asts: Ace Baldwin Jr., 6	Pts: John Mobley Jr., 19; Rebs: Devin Royal, 8 Asts: John Mobley Jr., 8

Rec Hall • State College, Pennsylvania
Attendance: 6,198
Referees: Randy Richardson, James Breeding, Earl Walton

=== at No. 18 Illinois ===
CBS

February 2, 2025
1:00 p.m. EST

Box score

Ohio State Buckeyes 79, No. 18 Illinois Fighting Illini 87
Scoring by half: 42–36, 37–51
Pts: Devin Royal, 29; Rebs: Bruce Thornton, 8 Asts: Bruce Thornton, 5	Pts: Will Riley, 24; Rebs: Morez Johnson Jr., 15; Asts: Kasparas Jakučionis, 7

State Farm Center • Champaign, Illinois
Attendance: 15,544
Referees: Michael Irving, D.J. Carstensen, Keith Kimble

=== vs No. 18 Maryland ===
FS1

February 6, 2025
7:00 p.m. EST

Box score

No. 18 Maryland Terrapins 70, Ohio State Buckeyes 73
Scoring by half: 41–32, 29–41
Pts: Julian Reese, 24; Rebs: Julian Reese, 13; Asts: Ja'Kobi Gillespie, 4	Pts: Bruce Thornton, 31; Rebs: Devin Royal, 11; Asts: Bruce Thornton, 6

Value City Arena • Columbus, Ohio
Attendance: 10,155
Referees: Larry Scirotto, Kelly Pfeifer, Jeffrey Anderson

=== at Nebraska ===
BTN

February 9, 2025
2:00 p.m. EST

Box score

Ohio State Buckeyes 71, Nebraska Cornhuskers 79
Scoring by half: 39–34, 32–45
Pts: Micah Parrish, 30; Rebs: Evan Mahaffey, 5 Asts: Bruce Thornton, 5	Pts: Brice Williams, 24; Rebs: Brice Williams, 10; Asts: Brice Williams, 4

Pinnacle Bank Arena • Lincoln, Nebraska
Attendance: 15,633
Referees: Jason Phillips, Terry Oglesby, Earl Walton

=== vs Washington ===
BTN

February 12, 2025
8:30 p.m. EST

Box score

Washington Huskies 69, Ohio State Buckeyes 93
Scoring by half: 36–51, 33–42
Pts: 3 tied, 14; Rebs: Great Osobor, 6 Asts: Great Osobor, 3	Pts: 2 tied, 21; Rebs: 2 tied, 7 Asts: Bruce Thornton, 5

Value City Arena • Columbus, Ohio
Attendance: 9,987
Referees: Michael Irving, Michael Reed, Keith Kimble

=== vs No. 20 Michigan (rivalry) ===
CBS

February 16, 2025
1:00 p.m. EST

Box score

No. 20 Michigan Wolverines 86, Ohio State Buckeyes 83
Scoring by half: 44–39, 42–44
Pts: Vladislav Goldin, 20; Rebs: Danny Wolf, 11; Asts: Danny Wolf, 5	Pts: Devin Royal, 26; Rebs: Sean Stewart, 10; Asts: Bruce Thornton, 6

Value City Arena • Columbus, Ohio
Attendance: 18,058
Referees: Earl Walton, Doug Sirmons, Brian Dorsey

=== vs Northwestern ===
FS1

February 20, 2025
6:30 p.m. EST

Box score

Northwestern Wildcats 70, Ohio State Buckeyes 49
Scoring by half: 31–24, 39–25
Pts: Nick Martinelli, 18; Rebs: 2 tied, 6 Asts: 2 tied, 2	Pts: Micah Parrish, 16; Rebs: Sean Stewart, 8 Asts: Bruce Thornton, 4

Value City Arena • Columbus, Ohio
Attendance: 12,684
Referees: Kevin Brill, James Breeding, Keith Kimble

=== at UCLA ===
CBS

February 23, 2025
3:45 p.m. EST

Box score

Ohio State Buckeyes 61, UCLA Bruins 69
Scoring by half: 24–28, 37–41
Pts: Bruce Thornton, 21; Rebs: Micah Parrish, 7 Asts: Bruce Thornton, 3	Pts: Eric Dailey Jr., 20; Rebs: Kobe Johnson, 13; Asts: 2 tied, 4

Pauley Pavilion • Los Angeles, California
Attendance: 9,015
Referees: Tommy Nunez, Randy Richardson, Earl Walton

=== at USC ===
BTN

February 26, 2025
10:30 p.m. EST

Box score

Ohio State Buckeyes 87, USC Trojans 82
Scoring by half: 52–38, 35–44
Pts: 2 tied, 20; Rebs: Devin Royal, 5 Asts: Bruce Thornton, 5	Pts: Wesley Yates III, 27; Rebs: Saint Thomas, 5 Asts: Saint Thomas, 5

Galen Center • Los Angeles, California
Attendance: 5,720
Referees: Larry Scirotto, Kelly Pfeifer, Verne Harris

=== vs Nebraska ===
Peacock

March 4, 2025
9:00 p.m. EST

Box score

Nebraska Cornhuskers 114, Ohio State Buckeyes 116 (OT)
Scoring by half: 39–45, 50–44 Overtime: 10–10, 15–17
Pts: Brice Williams, 43; Rebs: 2 tied, 7 Asts: Berke Büyüktuncel, 4	Pts: Bruce Thornton, 29; Rebs: Devin Royal, 8 Asts: Bruce Thornton, 9

Value City Arena • Columbus, Ohio
Attendance: 10,021
Referees: Kelly Pfeifer, Randy Richardson, Brian Dorsey

=== at Indiana ===
CBS

March 8, 2025
3:45 p.m. EST

Box score

Ohio State Buckeyes 60, Indiana Hoosiers 66
Scoring by half: 29–25, 31–41
Pts: Micah Parrish, 19; Rebs: 2 tied, 7 Asts: 2 tied, 4	Pts: 2 tied, 16; Rebs: 2 tied, 8 Asts: Trey Galloway, 6

Simon Skjodt Assembly Hall • Bloomington, Indiana
Attendance: 17,222
Referees: John Floyd, Tim Comer, Earl Walton

== Big Ten tournament ==
=== vs. (15) Iowa (First round) ===
Peacock

March 12, 2025
6:00 p.m. EDT

Box score

(15) Iowa Hawkeyes 77, (10) Ohio State Buckeyes 70
Scoring by half: 37–37, 40–33
Pts: Payton Sandfort, 17; Rebs: Ladji Dembele, 9 Asts: Josh Dix, 4	Pts: Bruce Thornton, 24; Rebs: 2 tied, 6 Asts: Bruce Thornton, 9

Gainbridge Fieldhouse • Indianapolis, Indiana
Attendance: 12,922
Referees: Earl Walton, DJ Carstensen, Brian Dorsey

== Rankings ==
Ranking movements Legend: ██ Increase in ranking ██ Decrease in ranking — = Not ranked RV = Received votes
	Week																				
Poll	Pre	1	2	3	4	5	6	7	8	9	10	11	12	13	14	15	16	17	18	19	Final
AP	RV	21	RV	RV	RV	—	—	RV	RV	—	—	—	—	—	—	—	—	—	—	—	—
Coaches	RV	22	RV	RV	RV	—	—	—	—	—	—	—	—	—	—	—	—	—	—	—	—

== See also ==
- 2024–25 Ohio State Buckeyes women's basketball team
