= 2025–26 Oregon Ducks men's basketball team =

American college basketball season

2025–26 Oregon Ducks men's basketball
- Conference: Big Ten Conference
- Record: 12–20 (5–15 Big Ten)
- Head coach: Dana Altman (16th season)
- Assistant coaches: Tony Stubblefield; Mike Mennenga; Brian Fish; Yasir Rosemond
- Home arena: Matthew Knight Arena

2025–26 Big Ten Conference men's basketball standings
	Conf.				Overall
Team	W		L	PCT	W		L	PCT
No. 1 Michigan	19	–	1	.950	37	–	3	.925
No. 14 Nebraska	15	–	5	.750	28	–	7	.800
No. 5 Illinois	15	–	5	.750	28	–	9	.757
No. 11 Michigan State	15	–	5	.750	27	–	8	.771
No. 25 Wisconsin	14	–	6	.700	24	–	11	.686
No. 6 Purdue †	13	–	7	.650	30	–	9	.769
UCLA	13	–	7	.650	24	–	12	.667
Ohio State	12	–	8	.600	21	–	13	.618
No. 15 Iowa	10	–	10	.500	24	–	13	.649
Indiana	9	–	11	.450	18	–	14	.563
Minnesota	8	–	12	.400	15	–	18	.455
USC	7	–	13	.350	18	–	14	.563
Washington	7	–	13	.350	16	–	17	.485
Rutgers	6	–	14	.300	14	–	20	.412
Northwestern	5	–	15	.250	15	–	19	.441
Oregon	5	–	15	.250	12	–	20	.375
Maryland	4	–	16	.200	12	–	21	.364
Penn State	3	–	17	.150	12	–	20	.375
† 2026 Big Ten tournament winner Rankings from AP poll

The 2025–26 Oregon Ducks men's basketball team represented the University of Oregon during the 2025–26 NCAA Division I men's basketball season. The Ducks were led by 16th-year head coach Dana Altman, and played their home games at Matthew Knight Arena as second-year members of the Big Ten Conference. The finished the season 12–20, 5–15 in Big Ten play to finish tied for 15th place. They lost to Maryland in the first round of the Big Ten tournament.

== Previous season ==
The Ducks finished the 2024–25 season 25-10, 12–8 in Big Ten play to finish in eighth place. In the Big Ten tournament, they defeated Indiana in the second round before losing to Michigan State in the quarterfinals. They received an at–large bid to the NCAA tournament as the No. 5 seed in the East region. There, they defeated Liberty in the first round before losing to Arizona in the second round.

== Offseason ==
=== Departures ===
Oregon departures
Name	Number	Pos.	Height	Weight	Year	Hometown	Reason for departure
Ra'Heim Moss	0	G	6'4"	205	Senior	Springfield, OH	Graduated
Jadrian Tracey	2	G/F	6'5"	210	(redshirt) Senior	Fort Myers, FL	Transferred to VCU
TJ Bamba	5	G	6'5"	210	Graduate student	The Bronx, NY	Graduated
Supreme Cook	7	F	6'9"	200	Graduate student	East Orange, NJ	Graduated
Keeshawn Barthelemy	9	G	6'2"	180	Graduate student	Montreal, QC	Graduated
Mookie Cook	11	F	6' 6"	215	Sophomore	Portland, OR	Transferred to San Francisco
James Cooper	12	F	6'7"	215	Senior	Mauldin, SC	Walk-on; transferred to Georgia State
Andre Warren	15	G	6'3"	175	Junior	Stockton, CA	Walk-on; not retained
Brandon Angel	21	F	6'8"	205	Graduate student	Torrey Pines, CA	Graduated

=== Incoming transfers ===
Oregon incoming transfers
Name	Number	Pos.	Height	Weight	Year	Hometown	Previous school
Takai Simpkins	5	G	6'5"	190	Senior	Brooklyn, NY	Elon
Sean Stewart	13	F	6'9"	220	Junior	Windermere, FL	Ohio State
Devon Pryor	22	F	6'7"	185	Junior	Houston, TX	Texas
Miles Stewart	35	F	6'8"	215	(redshirt) Senior	Windermere, FL	Howard

=== 2025 recruiting class ===
College recruiting
Name	Hometown	School	Height	Weight	Commit date
JJ Frakes; SG	Berrien Springs, MI	Berrien Springs High School	6 ft 5 in (1.96 m)	190 lb (86 kg)	Dec 16, 2024
JJ Frakes; SG	Recruit ratings: Rivals: 247Sports: (NR)				
Ege Demir; C	Kaduna, Nigeria	Darüşşafaka Lassa	6 ft 10 in (2.08 m)	250 lb (110 kg)	Jul 21, 2025
Ege Demir; C	Recruit ratings: No ratings found				
Efe Vatan; C	Istanbul, Turkey	Galatasaray S.K.	6 ft 11 in (2.11 m)	275 lb (125 kg)	Aug 14, 2025
Efe Vatan; C	Recruit ratings: No ratings found				
Overall recruit ranking: Rivals: 113 247Sports: 176
Note: In many cases, Scout, Rivals, 247Sports, On3, and ESPN may conflict in their listings of height and weight.; In these cases, the average was taken. ESPN grades are on a 100-point scale.; Sources:

Additionally, on October 1, 2025, two-time CBA All-Star Lin Wei committed to play college basketball at Oregon. He became the first former Chinese professional basketball player to play college basketball.

== Roster ==
2025–26 Oregon Ducks men's basketball team
Players
Coaches

Pos.	#	Name	Height	Weight	Year	Previous school	Hometown
F	0	Efe Vatan	6 ft 10 in (2.08 m)	230 lb (104 kg)	RS Fr	Galatasaray S.K.	Istanbul, Turkey
G	3	Jackson Shelstad (injured)	6 ft 0 in (1.83 m)	170 lb (77 kg)	Jr	West Linn High School	West Linn, Oregon
F	4	Dezdrick Lindsay	6 ft 6 in (1.98 m)	200 lb (91 kg)	Sr	Florida SouthWestern State College	Louisville, Kentucky
G	5	Takai Simpkins	6 ft 5 in (1.96 m)	190 lb (86 kg)	Jr	Elon	Brooklyn, New York
F	6	Oleksandr Kobzystyi	6 ft 8 in (2.03 m)	210 lb (95 kg)	Sr	KK Mega Basket	Kremenchuk, Ukraine
G	7	Luke Johnson (W)	6 ft 8 in (2.03 m)	225 lb (102 kg)	So	Huntington High School	Portland, Oregon
F/C	10	Kwame Evans	6 ft 9 in (2.06 m)	220 lb (100 kg)	Jr	Montverde Academy	Baltimore, Maryland
G	12	Drew Carter (W)	6 ft 3 in (1.91 m)	190 lb (86 kg)	Sr	UC Davis	Portland, Oregon
F	13	Sean Stewart	6 ft 9 in (2.06 m)	225 lb (102 kg)	Jr	Ohio State	Windermere, Florida
G	14	JJ Frakes	6 ft 5 in (1.96 m)	185 lb (84 kg)	Fr	Berrien Springs High School	Berrien Springs, Michigan
G	15	Rian Gonzales	6 ft 3 in (1.91 m)	180 lb (82 kg)	Fr	Volcano Vista High School	Albuquerque, New Mexico
C	16	Ege Demir	6 ft 11 in (2.11 m)	275 lb (125 kg)	Jr	Darüşşafaka Lassa	Kaduna, Nigeria
F	22	Devon Pryor (injured)	6 ft 7 in (2.01 m)	190 lb (86 kg)	So	Texas	Houston, TX
G	23	Wei Lin	6 ft 4 in (1.93 m)	190 lb (86 kg)	So	Nanjing Monkey Kings	Xiamen, China
G	24	Jamari Phillips	6 ft 4 in (1.93 m)	190 lb (86 kg)	So	Dream City Christian (AZ)	Modesto, California
C	32	Nathan Bittle	7 ft 0 in (2.13 m)	215 lb (98 kg)	Sr	Prolific Prep	Central Point, Oregon
F	35	Miles Stewart	6 ft 8 in (2.03 m)	215 lb (98 kg)	RS Sr	Howard	Windermere, Florida

Head coach

- Dana Altman (Eastern New Mexico)

Assistant coach(es)

- Tony Stubblefield (Omaha)
- Mike Mennenga (Morehead State)
- Brian Fish (Marshall)
- Yasir Rosemond (Oregon)

Legend

- (C) Team captain
- (S) Suspended
- (I) Ineligible
- (W) Walk-on
- Injured
- Current redshirt

Roster

== Schedule and results ==
Date time, TV	Rank^{#}	Opponent^{#}	Result	Record	High points	High rebounds	High assists	Site (attendance) city, state
Exhibition
October 24, 2025*; 7:00 p.m., B1G+		Utah	W 73–53	–	20 – Bittle	12 – Bittle	4 – Tied	Matthew Knight Arena (6,893); Eugene, OR
October 30, 2025*; 5:00 p.m., ACCNX/ESPN+		at Stanford	L 70–78	–	15 – S. Stewart	9 – Evans Jr.	5 – Evans Jr.	Maples Pavilion (2,349); Stanford, CA
Regular season
November 4, 2025*; 7:30 p.m., BTN		Hawaii	W 60–59	1–0	12 – Bittle	14 – Bittle	3 – Evans Jr.	Matthew Knight Arena (5,627); Eugene, OR
November 7, 2025*; 7:00 p.m., B1G+		Rice	W 67–63	2–0	25 – Bittle	8 – Bittle	5 – Simpkins	Matthew Knight Arena (5,619); Eugene, OR
November 12, 2025*; 6:30 p.m., Peacock		South Dakota State	W 83–69	3–0	22 – Shelstad	10 – Bittle	8 – Shelstad	Matthew Knight Arena (5,019); Eugene, OR
November 17, 2025*; 7:00 p.m., FS1		Oregon State; Rivalry	W 87–75	4–0	24 – Bittle	14 – Evans Jr.	3 – Shelstad	Matthew Knight Arena (7,616); Eugene, OR
November 24, 2025*; 5:00 p.m., truTV		vs. No. 21 Auburn; Players Era Festival Game 1	L 73–84	4–1	22 – Simpkins	10 – Pryor	8 – Shelstad	Michelob Ultra Arena; Paradise, NV
November 25, 2025*; 8:00 p.m., TNT		vs. San Diego State; Players Era Festival Game 2	L 80–97	4–2	21 – Shelstad	5 – Evans Jr.	5 – Evans Jr.	Michelob Ultra Arena; Paradise, NV
November 27, 2025*; 11:00 a.m., truTV		vs. Creighton; Players Era Festival consolation game	L 66–76	4–3	18 – S. Stewart	9 – Demir	5 – Shelstad	Michelob Ultra Arena; Paradise, NV
December 2, 2025; 7:00 p.m., FS1		No. 24 USC	L 77–82	4–4 (0–1)	23 – Evans Jr.	9 – Evans Jr.	5 – Tied	Matthew Knight Arena (6,107); Eugene, OR
December 6, 2025; 3:00 p.m., Peacock		at UCLA	L 63–74	4–5 (0–2)	20 – Shelstad	6 – Tied	2 – Tied	Pauley Pavilion (7,022); Los Angeles, CA
December 13, 2025*; 1:00 p.m., BTN		UC Davis	W 104–62	5–5	21 – Shelstad	13 – Evans Jr.	9 – Shelstad	Matthew Knight Arena (5,299); Eugene, OR
December 17, 2025*; 8:00 p.m., BTN		Portland	W 94–69	6–5	21 – Evans Jr.	7 – Tied	4 – Tied	Matthew Knight Arena (4,479); Eugene, OR
December 21, 2025*; 6:00 p.m., Peacock		vs. No. 7 Gonzaga; Northwest Elite Showdown	L 82–91	6–6	28 – Bittle	9 – Bittle	5 – Bittle	Moda Center (10,055); Portland, OR
December 28, 2025*; 5:00 p.m., BTN		Omaha	W 80–57	7–6	26 – Bittle	13 – S. Stewart	7 – Lindsay	Matthew Knight Arena (5,392); Eugene, OR
January 2, 2026; 4:30 p.m., Peacock		at Maryland	W 64–54	8–6 (1–2)	16 – Tied	8 – Evans Jr.	4 – Simpkins	Xfinity Center (11,291); College Park, MD
January 5, 2026; 4:00 p.m., Peacock		at Rutgers	L 85–88 ^{OT}	8–7 (1–3)	28 – Bittle	13 – Evans Jr.	5 – Lin	Jersey Mike's Arena (8,000); Piscataway, NJ
January 8, 2025; 7:30 p.m., BTN		Ohio State	L 62–72	8–8 (1–4)	14 – Bittle	9 – Bittle	5 – Lin	Matthew Knight Arena (6,037); Eugene, OR
January 13, 2026; 6:00 p.m., BTN		at No. 8 Nebraska	L 55–90	8–9 (1–5)	14 – Lin	7 – S. Stewart	3 – Tied	Pinnacle Bank Arena (15,163); Lincoln, NE
January 17, 2026; 1:00 p.m., NBC		No. 4 Michigan	L 71–81	8–10 (1–6)	22 – S. Stewart	8 – S. Stewart	4 – Lin	Matthew Knight Arena (8,750); Eugene, OR
January 20, 2026; 6:00 p.m., FS1		No. 10 Michigan State	L 52–68	8–11 (1–7)	15 – Simpkins	7 – Simpkins	4 – Lindsay	Matthew Knight Arena (6,634); Eugene, OR
January 25, 2026; 12:00 p.m., Peacock		at Washington; Rivalry	L 57–72	8–12 (1–8)	15 – S. Stewart	8 – Evans Jr.	1 – Tied	Alaska Airlines Arena (7,346); Seattle, WA
January 28, 2026; 8:00 p.m., BTN		UCLA	L 57–73	8–13 (1–9)	24 – Evans Jr.	8 – Tied	3 – S. Stewart	Matthew Knight Arena (5,721); Eugene, OR
February 1, 2026; 5:00 p.m., FS1		Iowa	L 66–84	8–14 (1–10)	18 – Evans Jr.	8 – S. Stewart	4 – Simpkins	Matthew Knight Arena (5,807); Eugene, OR
February 7, 2026; 10:00 a.m., CBS		at No. 12 Purdue	L 64–68	8–15 (1–11)	23 – Bittle	7 – Tied	3 – Tied	Mackey Arena (14,876); West Lafayette, IN
February 9, 2026; 5:30 p.m., FS1		at Indiana	L 74–92	8–16 (1–12)	15 – Bittle	8 – Bittle	6 – Bittle	Assembly Hall (17,222); Bloomington, IN
February 14, 2026; 12:00 p.m., BTN		Penn State	W 83–72	9–16 (2–12)	22 – Tied	9 – Evans Jr.	5 – Tied	Matthew Knight Arena (6,102); Eugene, OR
February 17, 2026; 7:45 p.m., FS1		Minnesota	L 44–61	9–17 (2–13)	15 – Bittle	9 – Evans Jr.	4 – Tied	Matthew Knight Arena (5,204); Eugene, OR
February 21, 2026; 1:00 p.m., FS1		at USC	W 71–70	10–17 (3–13)	21 – Evans Jr.	11 – Bittle	2 – Tied	Galen Center (6,490); Los Angeles, CA
February 25, 2026; 8:00 p.m., BTN		Wisconsin	W 85–71	11–17 (4–13)	20 – Bittle	6 – Tied	5 – Tied	Matthew Knight Arena (5,682); Eugene, OR
February 28, 2026; 11:00 a.m., BTN		at Northwestern	L 62–63	11–18 (4–14)	19 – Bittle	15 – Evans Jr.	5 – Carter	Welsh–Ryan Arena (5,564); Evanston, IL
March 3, 2026; 6:00 p.m., Peacock		at No. 11 Illinois	L 54–80	11–19 (4–15)	15 – Bittle	8 – Tied	5 – Simpkins	State Farm Center (15,544); Champaign, IL
March 7, 2026; 8:00 p.m., FS1		Washington; Rivalry	W 85–79	12–19 (5–15)	20 – Evans Jr	7 – Tied	5 – Bittle	Matthew Knight Arena (7,472); Eugene, OR
Big Ten Tournament
March 10, 2026; 2:00 p.m., Peacock/NBCSN	(16)	vs. (17) Maryland; First round	L 60−70	12−20	16 – Bittle	9 – Evans Jr.	5 – Simpkins	United Center (15,828); Chicago, IL
*Non-conference game. ^{#}Rankings from AP Poll. (#) Tournament seedings in parentheses. All times are in Pacific Time.
