= Aden Holloway =

American basketball player (born 2004)

No. 2 – Alabama Crimson Tide
- Position: Point guard
- Conference: Southeastern Conference

Personal information
- Born: September 7, 2004 (age 22) Charlotte, North Carolina, U.S.
- Listed height: 6 ft 1 in (1.85 m)
- Listed weight: 185 lb (84 kg)

Career information
- High school: Covenant Day School (Matthews, North Carolina); La Lumiere School (La Porte, Indiana); Prolific Prep (Napa, California)
- College: Auburn (2023–2024); Alabama (2024–present)

Career highlights
- Third-team All-SEC (2026); SEC All-Freshman Team (2024); McDonald's All-American (2023); Jordan Brand Classic (2023); Nike Hoop Summit (2023)

Aden Lateef Holloway (born September 7, 2004) is an American-Canadian college basketball player for the Alabama Crimson Tide in the Southeastern Conference (SEC). He previously played for the Auburn Tigers.

== Early life and high school career ==
Holloway grew up in Charlotte, North Carolina and initially attended Covenant Day School in Matthews, North Carolina. He averaged 21.9 points, 5.3 rebounds, 2.7 assists, and 2.3 steals per game as a sophomore. After the school year, he transferred to La Lumiere School in La Porte, Indiana. Holloway transferred a second time to Prolific Prep in Napa, California before the start of his senior year. He averaged 18.5 points, 5.1 assists, and 4.4 rebounds per game during the season. Holloway played in the 2023 McDonald's All-American Boys Game and scored 15 points. He was also selected to play for Team World in the Nike Hoops Summit.

=== Recruiting ===
Holloway was initially rated a four-star recruit and committed to playing college basketball for Auburn over offers from Tennessee, Miami, and Wake Forest. During his senior year, he received a final rating as a five-star recruit by ESPN and 247Sports.

College recruiting
Name	Hometown	School	Height	Weight	Commit date
Aden Holloway; PG	Charlotte, NC	Prolific Prep (CA)	6 ft 1 in (1.85 m)	165 lb (75 kg)	Aug 1, 2022
Aden Holloway; PG	Recruit ratings: Rivals: 247Sports: ESPN: (90)				
Overall recruit ranking: Rivals: 29 247Sports: 16 ESPN: 17
Note: In many cases, Scout, Rivals, 247Sports, On3, and ESPN may conflict in their listings of height and weight.; In these cases, the average was taken. ESPN grades are on a 100-point scale.; Sources: "Auburn 2023 Basketball Commitments". Rivals.; "2023 Auburn Tigers Recruiting Class". ESPN.; "2023 Team Ranking". Rivals.

== College career ==
As a freshman at Auburn, Holloway averaged 7.3 points and 2.7 assists per game. Following the season, he transferred to Alabama.

== Career statistics ==
Legend
GP	Games played	GS	Games started	MPG	Minutes per game
FG%	Field goal percentage	3P%	3-point field goal percentage	FT%	Free throw percentage
RPG	Rebounds per game	APG	Assists per game	SPG	Steals per game
BPG	Blocks per game	PPG	Points per game	**Bold**	Career high

=== College ===
Year	Team	GP	GS	MPG	FG%	3P%	FT%	RPG	APG	SPG	BPG	PPG
2023–24	Auburn	35	26	20.2	.318	.302	.774	1.5	2.7	.5	.0	7.3
2024–25	Alabama	**37**	0	21.1	.465	.412	.776	1.9	1.9	**.6**	.0	11.4
2025–26	Alabama	28	**27**	**28.4**	**.481**	**.438**	**.864**	**2.8**	**3.8**	**.6**	–	**16.8**
Career		100	53	22.8	.428	.386	.819	2.0	2.7	.6	.0	11.5

== Personal life ==
Holloway is a dual citizen of Canada through his mother, Robin Raimey, who was born in Calgary. His maternal grandfather, Dave Raimey, played for the Michigan Wolverines football program, and briefly in the National Football League (NFL) for the Cleveland Browns, before playing in the Canadian Football League (CFL) and being inducted in the Canadian Football Hall of Fame. His younger sister, Mila Holloway, plays college basketball for the Michigan Wolverines.

=== Legal issues ===
On March 16, 2026, Holloway was arrested in Tuscaloosa, Alabama after he was found in possession of at least one pound of marijuana. The marijuana in his possession was alleged by arresting officers to not be for personal use, with Holloway also found to be in possession of cash and drug paraphernalia. He was released from county jail after posting a $5,000 bond. Holloway was charged with both first-degree possession of marijuana (not for personal use), a Class C felony, and failure to affix a tax stamp, which is also a felony. Following this arrest, Holloway was suspended by the University of Alabama pending an investigation. He remained on the roster.
