= 2023 McDonald's All-American Boys Game =

American high school basketball game

West	East
106	109
	1st half	2nd half	Total
West	60	46	106
East	51	58	109
- Date: March 28, 2023
- Venue: Toyota Center, Houston, Texas
- MVP: D. J. Wagner & Isaiah Collier
- Network: ESPN

McDonald's All-American

The 2023 McDonald's All-American Boys Game was an all-star basketball game that was played on March 28, 2023, at Toyota Center in Houston, Texas. The game's rosters featured the best and most highly recruited high school boys graduating in the class of 2023. The game was the 46th annual version of the McDonald's All-American Game first played in 1977. The 24 players were selected from over 700 nominees by a committee of basketball experts. They were chosen not only for their on-court skills, but for their performances off the court as well.

== Rosters ==
The roster was announced on January 24, 2023. Kentucky has the most selections with four, while Duke had three and Michigan State and Oregon both had two each. At the announcement of the roster selections, 15 schools were represented, one player, Matas Buzelis, opted for the G League and one player, Bronny James, was uncommitted.

=== Team East ===
ESPN 100 Rank	Name	Height (ft–in)	Weight (lb)	Position	Hometown	High school	College choice
7	Xavier Booker	6–10	210	C	Indianapolis, Indiana	Cathedral High School	Michigan State
4	Aaron Bradshaw	7–0	215	C	Roselle, New Jersey	Camden High School	Kentucky
9	Matas Buzelis	6–9	195	SF	Hinsdale, Illinois	Sunrise Christian Academy	NBA G League Ignite
15	Stephon Castle	6–6	190	PG	Covington, Georgia	Newton High School	UConn
1	Justin Edwards	6–7	190	SF	Philadelphia, Pennsylvania	Imhotep Institute Charter High School	Kentucky
13	Kwame Evans Jr.	6–9	200	PF	Baltimore, Maryland	Montverde Academy	Oregon
17	Aden Holloway	6–1	165	PG	Matthews, North Carolina	Prolific Prep	Auburn
22	Elmarko Jackson	6–3	185	SG	Marlton, New Jersey	South Kent School	Kansas
8	Mackenzie Mgbako	6–8	195	SF	Gladstone, New Jersey	Roselle Catholic High School	Indiana*
16	Sean Stewart	6–8	230	PF	Windermere, Florida	Montverde Academy	Duke
2	D. J. Wagner	6–2	175	PG	Camden, New Jersey	Camden High School	Kentucky
6	Cody Williams	6–7	185	SF	Gilbert, Arizona	Perry High School	Colorado

Note: * Mgbako was committed to Duke at time game was played but decommitted on April 11, 2023 and on May 12, 2023 committed to Indiana.

=== Team West ===
ESPN 100 Rank	Name	Height (ft–in)	Weight (lb)	Position	Hometown	High school	College choice
10	Omaha Biliew	6–9	210	PF	Waukee, Iowa	Waukee High School	Iowa State
3	Isaiah Collier	6–4	205	PG	Marietta, Georgia	Wheeler High School	USC
18	Mookie Cook	6–7	210	SF	Portland, Oregon	AZ Compass Prep	Oregon
19	Baye Fall	6–11	217	C	Dakar, Senegal	Accelerated Schools	Arkansas
20	Jeremy Fears Jr.	6–2	180	PG	Joliet, Illinois	Joliet West High School	Michigan State
30	Brandon Garrison	6–9	205	C	Oklahoma City, Oklahoma	Del City High School	Oklahoma State
5	Ron Holland	6–8	200	PF	Duncanville, Texas	Duncanville High School	NBA G League Ignite
28	Bronny James	6–3	180	PG	Cleveland, Ohio	Sierra Canyon High School	USC
12	Jared McCain	6–3	195	PG	Sacramento, California	Centennial High School	Duke
21	Reed Sheppard	6–2	175	SG	London, Kentucky	North Laurel High School	Kentucky
23	Andrej Stojaković	6–7	185	SF	Carmichael, California	Jesuit High School	Stanford
14	Ja'Kobe Walter	6–5	175	SG	McKinney, Texas	The Link Academy	Baylor

^undecided at the time of roster selection
~undecided at game time

== Box Score ==
ESPN

March 28, 2023
09:30 pm ET

East	109–106	West
Scoring by half: 51–60, 58–46
Pts: D. J. Wagner, 19; Rebs: 2 Tied, 9 Asts: D. J. Wagner, 12		Pts: Isaiah Collier, 25; Rebs: Ron Holland, 6 Asts: 2 Tied, 4

Toyota Center, Houston, Texas
