= Shooting Stars (2023 film) =

American film by Chris Robinson

- Official poster
- Directed by: Chris Robinson
- Screenplay by: Frank E. Flowers; Tony Rettenmaier; Juel Taylor
- Based on: Shooting Stars by: LeBron James; Buzz Bissinger
- Produced by: Rachel Winter; Terence Winter; LeBron James; Maverick Carter
- Starring: Mookie Cook; Caleb McLaughlin; Algee Smith; Dermot Mulroney
- Cinematography: Karsten Gopinath
- Edited by: Jo Francis
- Music by: Mark Isham
- Production companies: Universal Pictures; SpringHill Company
- Distributed by: Peacock
- Release date: June 2, 2023
- Running time: 115 minutes
- Country: United States
- Language: English
- Budget: $25 million

Shooting Stars is a 2023 American biographical sports drama film about the high school sports career of LeBron James. Directed by Chris Robinson from a screenplay by Frank E. Flowers, Tony Rettenmaier, and Juel Taylor, it is based on the 2009 book of the same name by James and Buzz Bissinger. The film stars Mookie Cook as the lead.

Shooting Stars was released on Peacock in the United States on June 2, 2023. The film received mixed reviews from critics.

== Plot ==
In Akron, Ohio, LeBron James, Dru Joyce III, Willie McGee and Sian Cotton have been friends and basketball teammates for the Shooting Stars since they were ten. Coach Joyce, Dru's father, is their coach.

The four boys, who work well together as a unit, call themselves Fab Four. When they finish middle school, Dru discovers that due to his height the local high school Buchtel will not permit him to play on the varsity team.

Wanting to avoid demotion and their separation, Dru approaches local private catholic school St. Vincent's to convince Coach Dambrot to take them, as he sees he has coached in the NCAA. Refusing to take no for an answer, Dru shows off his shooting skills, then guarantees Dambrot will win the state championship with them.

After a few months of classes are basketball tryouts, where they meet the other black students, who are seniors. All four pass through the grueling four hours. In the first game of the season, the freshmen are not meant to play. Finally Willie is called in, but the older players rarely include him.

Complaining about the game afterwards, the seniors and Fab Four agree to a pick-up game in their neighborhood. The younger group reaches 21 first. Coach Dambrot catches the end of the game, so Dru invites him to join them for dinner at home.

Coach Dambrot chats with Coach Joyce, who gives him the Fab Four's backgrounds. In many cases families encourage their children to play sports to keep them focused and out of trouble. The four are nonstop with basketball, both with a hoop and even in video games. Dambrot explains he is trying to keep them humble.

The team finishes the year undefeated, winning the state championship. In their sophomore year Romeo Travis gets recruited, having been expelled from his public school. The four know him from past rivalry. Coach Joyce also joins them as assistant coach.

After their first blowout of the season, the team goes to a party where LeBron meets his future wife Savannah, a Buchtel student. At the St. Vincent—Buchtel game, Dru hammers away, ignoring the coaches and leads them to victory.

Before their next state championship game, the team inadvertently discovers Coach Dambrot will be coaching at the University of Akron next season. The Four show Dambrot they can win without him by ignoring his plays and running their own. He leaves without seeing their win. By season end, Romeo has become so integral in the team, they rename themselves the Fab Five to include him.

Sports Illustrated features LeBron on their next cover, and his mother presents him with a Hummer. He soon is asked for selfies with him. One of them gifts him a vintage jersey.

When Savannah suggests LeBron do an SAT prep course, he insists neither of them need it as he will directly go the NBA. She leaves, angry with him, after warning how risky it is not to have a contingency plan.

As juniors, St. Vincent plays national teams, so goes on the road. Their winning streak is unbroken until they face the number one seed Oak Hill. LeBron goes to a party beforehand, to meet important players. He returns in bad shape, having partied too hard. The team ultimately loses.

Going into practice for their third championship, the team does not jell. After losing due to lack of communication, for the first time they stop hanging out, as it has stopped being fun.

At the start of senior year, Romeo rallies the team. They beat the number one seed in the country comfortably. Directly afterwards, LeBron is suspended allegedly for accepting bribes, as he accepted that jersey over a year ago, a valuable collector's item, and he has a Hummer.

LeBron is prohibited from interacting with the team for the full season. Regardless, the team reaches the playoffs. He then makes an appeal to the board to participate in the championship game as their last game together. They win, making them the most successful high school team up until then.

Lebron goes on to join the NBA, and the rest of the Shooting Stars play in college in Ohio, two of which play professionally in Europe and one becomes a rapper.

== Cast ==
- Mookie Cook as LeBron James
- Caleb McLaughlin as Dru Joyce III
- Algee Smith as Illya McGee
- Dermot Mulroney as Keith Dambrot
- Wood Harris as Dru Joyce II
- Natalie Paul as Gloria James
- Katlyn Nichol as Savannah James
- Avery Wills as Willie McGee
- Scoot Henderson as Romeo Travis
- Khalil Everage as Sian Cotton
- Jett Howard as Carmelo Anthony

== Production ==
In 2014, it was reported that a film based on LeBron James' high school years would be produced by Universal Pictures. The film is based on James' 2009 memoir of the same name, co-authored by Buzz Bissinger.

Principal photography began on April 18, 2022, in Beachwood, Ohio. Filming lasted until June 2022. Among the locations used for filming were St. Paul's Episcopal Church.

== Release ==
Shooting Stars premiered on Peacock on June 2, 2023. In the Philippines, the film was released on HBO Go on November 25, 2023.

== Reception ==
On the review aggregator website Rotten Tomatoes, 53% of 34 critics' reviews are positive, with an average rating of 5.9/10. The website's consensus reads: "Although Shooting Stars isn't without its engaging moments, this dramatized look back at LeBron James' early years is less entertaining than simply watching him play." Metacritic, which uses a weighted average, assigned the film a score of 62 out of 100, based on 11 critics, indicating "generally favorable" reviews.

Matt Zoller Seitz of RogerEbert.com gave the film four out of four stars, stating that "When a movie loves its characters and story as much as this one, and dedicates every aspect of filmmaking and performance to doing them justice, and consistently puts virtuosity in service of meaning, the result conjures a feeling that's close to what you experience when someone you adore has a great and richly deserved success, and you're privileged to be able to witness it and cheer them on."

== See also ==
- More than a Game — a 2008 documentary film about LeBron's high school years.
- List of basketball films
