= Micah Parrish =

American basketball player (born 2001)

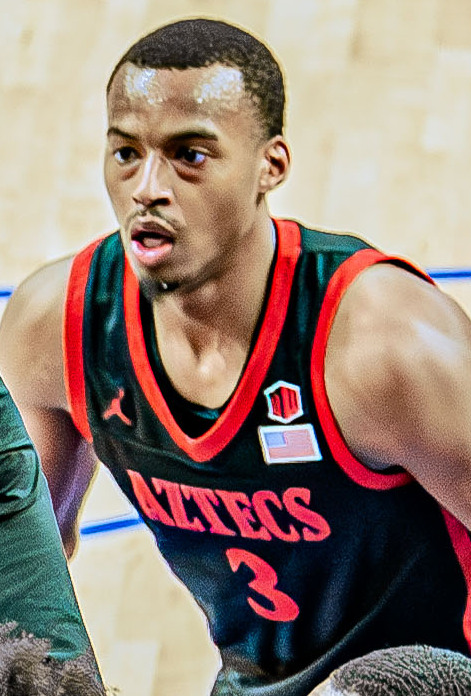
- Parrish in 2024

No. 3 – Doxa Lefkadas
- Position: Small forward
- League: GBL

Personal information
- Born: February 17, 2001 (age 25) Detroit, Michigan, U.S.
- Listed height: 6 ft 6 in (1.98 m)
- Listed weight: 180 lb (82 kg)

Career information
- High school: River Rouge (River Rouge, Michigan); Hillcrest Prep (Phoenix, Arizona)
- College: Oakland (2020–2022); San Diego State (2022–2024); Ohio State (2024–2025)
- NBA draft: 2025: undrafted
- Playing career: 2025–present

Career history
- 2025–2026: Sioux Falls Skyforce
- 2026: Cleveland Charge
- 2026–present: Doxa Lefkadas

Career highlights
- Horizon League All-Freshman Team (2021); Horizon League All-Defensive Team (2022)

Micah Immanuel Parrish (born February 17, 2001) is an American basketball player for Doxa Lefkadas of the Greek Basketball League (GBL). He played college basketball for the Ohio State Buckeyes, San Diego State Aztecs, and Oakland Golden Grizzlies.

== College career ==
On April 20, 2024, Parrish transferred to play at Ohio State. In his first game as a Buckeye, he dropped 17 points in a season-opening win over No. 19 Texas. In an 82–65 rout over Iowa, Parrish scored 18 points.

== Personal life ==
Parrish is a Christian. He has a father, Emanuel, a sister, Evangelina, who plays for Chicago State, and a brother, Elijah, who plays for Rochester Christian University.

== Career statistics ==
Legend
GP	Games played	GS	Games started	MPG	Minutes per game
FG%	Field goal percentage	3P%	3-point field goal percentage	FT%	Free throw percentage
RPG	Rebounds per game	APG	Assists per game	SPG	Steals per game
BPG	Blocks per game	PPG	Points per game	**Bold**	Career high

=== College ===
Year	Team	GP	GS	MPG	FG%	3P%	FT%	RPG	APG	SPG	BPG	PPG
2020–21	Oakland	29	27	29.1	**.550**	.349	.707	5.8	1.1	**1.7**	**0.5**	8.8
2021–22	Oakland	30	30	**34.3**	.440	**.353**	**.800**	**6.0**	1.4	**1.7**	0.2	**12.1**
2022–23	San Diego State	**39**	1	21.5	.378	**.353**	.764	3.6	0.6	0.7	0.3	7.4
2023–24	San Diego State	37	**36**	27.5	.390	.292	.737	4.1	**1.9**	1.2	0.4	9.3
2024–25	Ohio State											
**Career**		135	94	27.6	.428	.332	.757	4.7	1.3	1.3	0.4	9.3
