= 2025–26 NBA G League season =

- League: NBA G League
- Sport: Basketball
- Duration: November 2025 – April 2026
- Teams: 31

Draft
- Top draft pick: Dillon Jones
- Picked by: South Bay Lakers

Finals
- Champions: Greensboro Swarm
- Runners-up: Stockton Kings
- Finals MVP: Tosan Evbuomwan

NBA G League seasons
- ← 2024–25 2026–27 →

The 2025–26 NBA G League season was the 25th season of the NBA G League, the minor league basketball league of the National Basketball Association (NBA).

== League changes ==
- The Indiana Mad Ants moved to Noblesville, Indiana, and re-branded as the Noblesville Boom.

== International Draft ==
On July 8, 2025, the league organized an International Draft for foreign players.

Pick	Player	Position	Nationality	Team
1st	Aliou Diarra	C	Mali	Texas Legends
2nd	Nathan Missia-Dio	F	Belgium	Salt Lake City Stars
3rd	Reynan dos Santos	G	Brazil	Mexico City Capitanes
4th	Noam Yaacov	G	Israel	Cleveland Charge
5th	Jean-Jacques Boissy	G	Senegal	Memphis Hustle
6th	Carlin Davison	F	New Zealand	Rip City Remix
7th	Fabian Giessmann	G	Germany	Oklahoma City Blue
8th	Wei Lin	G	China	Texas Legends
9th	Michael Caicedo	F	Spain	Rip City Remix
10th	Higen Hasegawa	F	Japan	Westchester Knicks
11th	Joel Mäntynen	G	Finland	Rio Grande Valley Vipers
12th	Enrique Medina	C	Venezuela	Greensboro Swarm
13th	Tomás Chapero	C	Argentina	Grand Rapids Gold
14th	Gabriel Campos	G	Brazil	Austin Spurs
15th	Stefan Simanić	C	Bosnia and Herzegovina	Cleveland Charge
16th	Sergio Conceição	C	Brazil	Texas Legends
17th	Emmanuel Beya	F	DR Congo	Rip City Remix

== Tip–Off Tournament ==
=== East Division ===
Pos	Team	W	L	PCT	GB
1	Raptors 905 (TOR)	14	0	1.000	—
2	Greensboro Swarm (CHA)	10	4	.714	4
3	Maine Celtics (BOS)	9	5	.643	5
4	Long Island Nets (BKN)	7	7	.500	7
5	Capital City Go-Go (WAS)	6	8	.429	8
6	College Park Skyhawks (ATL)	5	9	.357	9
7	Delaware Blue Coats (PHI)	4	10	.286	10
8	Westchester Knicks (NYK)	1	13	.071	13

Source: GLeague.NBA.com

=== Central Division ===
Pos	Team	W	L	PCT	GB
1	Grand Rapids Gold (DEN)	10	4	.714	—
2	Cleveland Charge (CLE)	8	6	.571	2
3	Iowa Wolves (MIN)	8	6	.571	2
4	Sioux Falls Skyforce (MIA)	8	6	.571	2
5	Windy City Bulls (CHI)	7	7	.500	3
6	Motor City Cruise (DET)	6	8	.429	4
7	Noblesville Boom (IND)	5	9	.357	5
8	Wisconsin Herd (MIL)	4	10	.286	6

Source: GLeague.NBA.com

=== South Division ===
Pos	Team	W	L	PCT	GB
1	Austin Spurs (SAS)	12	2	.857	—
2	Osceola Magic (ORL)	8	6	.571	4
3	Texas Legends (DAL)	7	7	.500	5
4	Rio Grande Valley Vipers (HOU)	7	7	.500	5
5	Memphis Hustle (MEM)	7	7	.500	5
6	Mexico City Capitanes	6	8	.429	6
7	Birmingham Squadron (NO)	5	9	.357	7
8	Oklahoma City Blue (OKC)	4	10	.286	8

Source: GLeague.NBA.com

=== West Division ===
Pos	Team	W	L	PCT	GB
1	Salt Lake City Stars (UTA)	12	2	.857	—
2	Stockton Kings (SAC)	9	5	.643	3
3	San Diego Clippers (LAC)	9	5	.643	3
4	Rip City Remix (POR)	8	6	.571	4
5	South Bay Lakers (LAL)	7	7	.500	5
6	Valley Suns (PHX)	3	11	.214	9
7	Santa Cruz Warriors (GSW)	1	13	.071	11

Source: GLeague.NBA.com

=== Winter Showcase Cup ===
Quarterfinals; December 19
1	Raptors 905	110
8	San Diego Clippers	89
4	Greensboro Swarm	106
5	Grand Rapids Gold	119
3	Austin Spurs	117
6	Stockton Kings	119
2	Salt Lake City Stars	123
7	Maine Celtics	107

Semifinals; December 21
1	Raptors 905	103
5	Grand Rapids Gold	101
6	Stockton Kings	123
2	Salt Lake City Stars	127

Winter Showcase Championship; December 22
1	Raptors 905	112
2	Salt Lake City Stars	137

== Standings ==
=== Eastern Conference ===
Pos	Team	W	L	PCT	GB
1	Osceola Magic (ORL)	26	10	.722	—
2	Greensboro Swarm (CHA)	24	12	.667	2
3	Cleveland Charge (CLE)	23	13	.639	3
4	Raptors 905 (TOR)	23	13	.639	3
5	Motor City Cruise (DET)	22	14	.611	4
6	Capital City Go-Go (WAS)	19	17	.528	7
7	Maine Celtics (BOS)	18	18	.500	8
8	Long Island Nets (BKN)	18	18	.500	8
9	Delaware Blue Coats (PHI)	18	18	.500	8
10	Noblesville Boom (IND)	16	20	.444	10
11	Birmingham Squadron (NO)	16	20	.444	10
12	Windy City Bulls (CHI)	15	21	.417	11
13	College Park Skyhawks (ATL)	14	22	.389	12
14	Westchester Knicks (NYK)	14	22	.389	12
15	Grand Rapids Gold (DEN)	11	25	.306	15
16	Wisconsin Herd (MIL)	10	26	.278	16

Source: GLeague.NBA.com

=== Western Conference ===
Pos	Team	W	L	PCT	GB
1	South Bay Lakers (LAL)	26	10	.722	—
2	Mexico City Capitanes	24	12	.667	2
3	Stockton Kings (SAC)	23	13	.639	3
4	Rio Grande Valley Vipers (HOU)	23	13	.639	3
5	Austin Spurs (SAS)	23	13	.639	3
6	Iowa Wolves (MIN)	21	15	.583	5
7	Rip City Remix (PDX)	19	17	.528	7
8	San Diego Clippers (LAC)	18	18	.500	8
9	Sioux Falls Skyforce (MIA)	18	18	.500	8
10	Texas Legends (DAL)	14	22	.389	12
11	Salt Lake City Stars (UTA)	14	22	.389	12
12	Santa Cruz Warriors (GSW)	14	22	.389	12
13	Oklahoma City Blue (OKC)	12	24	.333	14
14	Valley Suns (PHO)	11	25	.306	15
15	Memphis Hustle (MEM)	11	25	.306	15

Source: GLeague.NBA.com

== Playoffs ==
- First Round: March 31 & April 1
- Conference Semifinals: April 3
- Conference Finals: April 5
- NBA G League Finals: April 8, 10, 13 (if necessary)

Conference Quarterfinals	Conference Semifinals
1	Osceola Magic	119
8	Long Island Nets	117
1	Osceola Magic	123
5	Motor City Cruise	116
4	Raptors 905	105
5	Motor City Cruise	120
Eastern Conference
2	Greensboro Swarm	112
7	Maine Celtics	90
2	Greensboro Swarm	118
6	Capital City Go-Go	108
3	Cleveland Charge	123
6	Capital City Go Go	126
1	South Bay Lakers	122
8	San Diego Clippers	119
1	South Bay Lakers	112
4	Rio Grande Valley Vipers	97
4	Rio Grande Valley Vipers	117
5	Austin Spurs	106
Western Conference
2	Mexico City Capitanes	108
7	Rip City Remix	113
7	Rip City Remix	95
3	Stockton Kings	107
3	Stockton Kings	116
6	Iowa Wolves	104

Conference Finals
1	Osceola Magic	121
2	Greensboro Swarm	134
1	South Bay Lakers	97
3	Stockton Kings	101

Finals; Best-of-three
2	Greensboro Swarm	111	119
3	Stockton Kings	107	104

=== Finals boxscore ===
April 8, 2026
7:30 p.m. ET

Boxscore

Stockton Kings 107, Greensboro Swarm 111
Scoring by quarter: 37–38, 20–25, 27–27, 23–21
Pts: DaQuan Jeffries 25; Rebs: Patrick Baldwin Jr., Dexter Dennis, Jon Elmore 7 Asts: DaQuan Jeffries 6	Pts: Marcus Garrett 21; Rebs: Jonas Aidoo 14; Asts: Terrell Brown Jr., Liam McNeeley 2

Novant Health Fieldhouse, Greensboro, North Carolina
Attendance: 1,678
Referees:
- #7 Agon Abazi
- #34 Brent Haskill
- #72 Marcy Williams
- #79 Klajdi Mulla

April 10, 2026
10:00 p.m. ET

Boxscore

Greensboro Swarm 119, Stockton Kings 104
Scoring by quarter: 25–19, 37–31, 27–33, 30–21
Pts: Tosan Evbuomwan 22; Rebs: Tidjane Salaün 10; Asts: Terrell Brown Jr. 10	Pts: DaQuan Jeffries 27; Rebs: DaQuan Jeffries 10; Asts: Jon Elmore 7
Greensboro Swarm win series 2–0

Adventist Health Arena, Stockton, California
Attendance: 4,020
Referees:
- #7 Agon Abazi
- #26 Nate Cearley
- #66 Chelisa Painter
- #5 Gina Catanzariti

== Media ==
Nationally, NBA G League games are broadcast on Amazon Prime Video, ESPN, NBA TV and The Roku Channel.

Locally games are aired on the following networks:

Team	Network	Notes/Source
Austin Spurs	FanDuel Sports Network Southwest	
Birmingham Squadron	WABM	
Capital City Go-Go	Monumental Sports Network	
Cleveland Charge	Rock Entertainment Sports Network	
College Park Skyhawks	WPCH-TV	
Delaware Blue Coats	DETV 28; WPSG	
Long Island Nets	YES Network/Gotham Sports App	
Maine Celtics	NBC Sports Boston	
Rip City Remix	KUNP	
Osceola Magic	FanDuel Sports Network Sun	26 games
Salt Lake City Stars	Jazz+	
Santa Cruz Warriors	NBC Sports Bay Area	
Sioux Falls Skyforce	FanDuel Sports Network Sun; WPLG (12 games)	
South Bay Lakers	Spectrum SportsNet	
Texas Legends	KFAA-TV; Urban Edge Network; MavsTV	
Valley Suns	Arizona's Family Sports; Suns Live	24 home games on Arizona's Family Sports
Westchester Knicks	MSG Network; Gotham Sports App	
Windy City Bulls	Chicago Sports Network	
Wisconsin Herd	WACY-TV	
