= Mookie Cook =

American basketball player (born 2004)

No. 1 – San Jose State Spartans
- Position: Small forward
- Conference: Mountain West Conference

Personal information
- Born: July 3, 2004 (age 22)
- Listed height: 6 ft 6 in (1.98 m)
- Listed weight: 215 lb (98 kg)

Career information
- High school: Jefferson (Portland, OR) (Portland, Oregon); AZ Compass Prep (Chandler, Arizona)
- College: Oregon (2023–2025); Kentucky (2025–2026); San Jose State (2026–present)

Career highlights
- McDonald's All-American (2023)

Marquis "Mookie" Cook (born July 3, 2004) is an American college basketball player for the San Jose State Spartans of the Mountain West Conference. He previously played for the Oregon Ducks and San Francisco Dons. Additionally, in 2023, Cook starred in the 2023 Peacock biographical film Shooting Stars, portraying a young LeBron James.

== Early life and high school career ==
Cook grew up in Portland, Oregon and initially attended Jefferson High School. After two seasons, Cook transferred to AZ Compas Prep in Chandler, Arizona, averaging 11.5 points in his first season. Cook was selected to play in the 2023 McDonald's All-American Boys Game during his senior year.

=== Recruiting ===
Cook was rated a consensus four-star recruit by ESPN, Rivals and 247Sports. In his senior year, he fielded more than 20 recruiting offers from NCAA Division I basketball programs. On March 7, 2022, Cook initially committed to play for the Oregon Ducks. However, on June 29, Cook de-committed from Oregon. Despite fielding offers from Arizona, Duke, Gonzaga and Kentucky, Cook re-committed to Oregon on August 12.

College recruiting
Name	Hometown	School	Height	Weight	Commit date
Mookie Cook; SF	Portland, OR	Compass Prep	6 ft 7 in (2.01 m)	200 lb (91 kg)	Aug 12, 2022
Mookie Cook; SF	Recruit ratings: Scout: Rivals: 247Sports: (89)				
Overall recruit ranking: Rivals: 32 247Sports: 40 ESPN: 21
Note: In many cases, Scout, Rivals, 247Sports, On3, and ESPN may conflict in their listings of height and weight.; In these cases, the average was taken. ESPN grades are on a 100-point scale.; Sources: "2023 Team Ranking". Rivals.

== College career ==
=== Oregon ===
Before the start of the 2023–24 season, Cook underwent ankle surgery before making his debut against Washington on January 4. After playing five more games, Cook reagrivated the injury and was shut down for the rest of the season. In his sophomore season, Cook struggled to break into the Ducks' rotation, appering in only 24 games and averaging 1.1 points. Following the season, Cook entered the transfer portal.

=== San Francisco ===
On April 15, 2025, Cook transferred to play for the San Francisco Dons. After averaging 7.6 points and 4.2 rebounds in one season, Cook entered the transfer portal.

=== San Jose State ===
On April 22, 2026, Cook transferred to play for the San Jose State Spartans.

== Acting career ==
In 2023, Cook portrayed a young LeBron James in a biopic about James Shooting Stars, released on Peacock. The film received mixed reviews, though Cook was praised for his on-screen chemistry with his co-stars and resemblance to a young James.
