= Brandon Noel =

American basketball player

Personal information
- Listed height: 6 ft 8 in (2.03 m)
- Listed weight: 240 lb (109 kg)

Career information
- High school: Chillicothe (Chillicothe, Ohio)
- College: Wright State (2022–2025); Ohio State (2025–2026)
- NBA draft: 2026: undrafted
- Position: Power forward / small forward

Career highlights
- Horizon League Freshman of the Year (2023)

Brandon Noel is an American basketball player. He played college basketball for the Wright State Raiders and Ohio State Buckeyes.

== Early life and high school ==
Originally from Lucasville, Ohio, Noel attended Chillicothe High School in Chillicothe, Ohio, where he was an unranked recruit. He committed to play college basketball for the Wright State Raiders, which was his only Division I offer.

== College career ==
=== Wright State ===
Noel missed his entire freshman season in 2020-21 due to a knee injury before taking a traditional redshirt year in 2021-22. In the 2022-23 season, he appeared in 33 games with 26 starts, where he averaged 13.0 points and 8.7 rebounds per game. Noel was named the Horizon League Freshman of the Year.

On January 4, 2024, Noel put up 24 points, nine rebounds, and two blocks in a victory versus Cleveland State. In the 2023-24 season, he averaged 14.5 points and 8.0 rebounds per game. On February 21, 2025, Noel tallied 22 points and 11 rebounds in a close loss to Eastern Kentucky. During the 2024-25 season, he averaged 19.0 points, 7.7 rebounds and 1.7 assists per game in 33 starts. After the season, he entered his name into the NCAA transfer portal.

=== Ohio State ===
Noel transferred to play for the Ohio State Buckeyes.
