= Devin Royal =

American basketball player (born 2004)

No. 21 – Villanova Wildcats
- Position: Power forward / small forward
- Conference: Big East Conference

Personal information
- Born: May 13, 2004 (age 22)
- Listed height: 6 ft 6 in (1.98 m)
- Listed weight: 230 lb (104 kg)

Career information
- High school: Pickerington Central (Pickerington, Ohio)
- College: Ohio State (2023–2026); Villanova (2026–present)

Career highlights
- Ohio Mr. Basketball (2023)

Devin Royal (born May 13, 2004) is an American college basketball player for the Villanova Wildcats of the Big East Conference. He previously played for the Ohio State Buckeyes.

== Early life and high school ==
Royal attended Pickerington High School Central in Pickerington, Ohio. As a junior, he averaged 19.1 points, 8.2 rebounds, and 1.6 assists per game and led his school to a state title, earning first-team all-state honors. Royal was then named Ohio Mr. Basketball as a senior. He averaged 19.6 points and 7.6 rebounds per game and led the team to the state semifinals. Coming out of high school, he was rated as a four-star recruit and committed to play college basketball for the Ohio State Buckeyes over offers from schools such as Michigan State, Marquette, Penn State, and Alabama.

== College career ==
On February 25, 2024, Royal recorded 14 points, two rebounds and two steals in a win over Michigan State. In his first collegiate season, he appeared in 33 games and averaged 4.7 points and 2.4 rebounds per game in 11.2 minutes of play. On November 19, 2024, Royal recorded his first career double-double, totaling 20 points and 12 rebounds, in a blowout win over Evansville. As a sophomore, he averaged 13.7 points and 6.9 rebounds per game. Royal averaged 13.7 points, 5.7 rebounds and 1.6 assists per game as a junior. Following the season he transferred to Villanova.
