= Aaron Bradshaw =

American basketball player (born 2003)

No. 3 – Tennessee State Tigers
- Position: Center
- Conference: Ohio Valley Conference

Personal information
- Born: November 16, 2003 (age 22) Newark, New Jersey, U.S.
- Listed height: 7 ft 1 in (2.16 m)
- Listed weight: 225 lb (102 kg)

Career information
- High school: Roselle Catholic (Roselle, New Jersey); Camden (Camden, New Jersey)
- College: Kentucky (2023–2024); Ohio State (2024–2025); Memphis (2025–2026); Tennessee State (2026–present)

Career highlights
- McDonald's All-American (2023); Jordan Brand Classic (2023)

Aaron Bradshaw (born November 16, 2003) is an American college basketball player for the Tennessee State Tigers of the Ohio Valley Conference (OVC). He previously played for the Kentucky Wildcats, Ohio State Buckeyes, and Memphis Tigers.

== Early life and high school career ==
Bradshaw grew up in Rahway, New Jersey and initially attended Roselle Catholic High School. He transferred to Camden High School in Camden, New Jersey after his freshman year and enrolled as an out-of district student paying a nominal tuition. Bradshaw missed his sophomore basketball season due to academic eligibility issues. Bradshaw averaged 8.9 points, 7.4 rebounds and 3.2 blocks per game as a junior. Bradshaw was selected to play in the 2023 McDonald's All-American Boys Game. He was also named a finalist for the Naismith Prep Player of the Year Award.

=== Recruiting ===
Bradshaw was a consensus five-star recruit and one of the top players in the 2023 class, according to major recruiting services. On October 14, 2022, he committed to playing college basketball for Kentucky over offers from Louisville, Texas, UCLA and USC. Bradshaw also considered playing professionally in the NBA G League.

College recruiting
| Name | Hometown | School | Height | Weight | Commit date |
|---|---|---|---|---|---|
| Aaron Bradshaw; C | Rahway, NJ | Camden (NJ) | 7 ft 0 in (2.13 m) | 210 lb (95 kg) | Oct 14, 2022 |
| Aaron Bradshaw; C | Recruit ratings: Rivals: 247Sports: ESPN: (93) | | | | |
Overall recruit ranking: Rivals: 2 247Sports: 5 ESPN: 6
Note: In many cases, Scout, Rivals, 247Sports, On3, and ESPN may conflict in their listings of height and weight.; In these cases, the average was taken. ESPN grades are on a 100-point scale.; Sources: "Kentucky 2023 Basketball Commitments". Rivals.; "2023 Kentucky Wildcats Recruiting Class". ESPN.; "2023 Team Ranking". Rivals.

== College career ==
Bradshaw enrolled at the University of Kentucky in June 2023. Shortly after enrolling, he underwent surgery on a broken foot that caused him to miss all of the Wildcats' preseason training and the start of his freshman season. Bradshaw was cleared to play one month into the season and made his college debut on December 2, 2023, in the Wildcats' upset loss to UNC Wilmington. The following game, he scored a season-high 17 points with 11 rebounds, three blocks, and one steal as Kentucky beat Penn 81-66. Bradshaw became the Wildcats' starting center afterwards, but was moved back to the bench at the end of January. He finished the season averaging 4.9 points and 3.3 rebounds over 26 games played. Bradshaw announced he would be entering the NCAA transfer portal shortly after it was reported that Kentucky head coach John Calipari would be leaving the program to become the head coach at Arkansas.

On April 15, 2024, Bradshaw announced on his Instagram page that he would be committing to Ohio State.

== Career statistics ==
Legend
| GP | Games played | GS | Games started | MPG | Minutes per game |
| FG% | Field goal percentage | 3P% | 3-point field goal percentage | FT% | Free throw percentage |
| RPG | Rebounds per game | APG | Assists per game | SPG | Steals per game |
| BPG | Blocks per game | PPG | Points per game | **Bold** | Career high |

=== College ===
| Year | Team | GP | GS | MPG | FG% | 3P% | FT% | RPG | APG | SPG | BPG | PPG |
|---|---|---|---|---|---|---|---|---|---|---|---|---|
| 2023–24 | Kentucky | 26 | 10 | 13.7 | .576 | .286 | .568 | 3.3 | 0.3 | 0.3 | 0.7 | 4.9 |
