= Meechie Johnson =

American basketball player (born 2002)

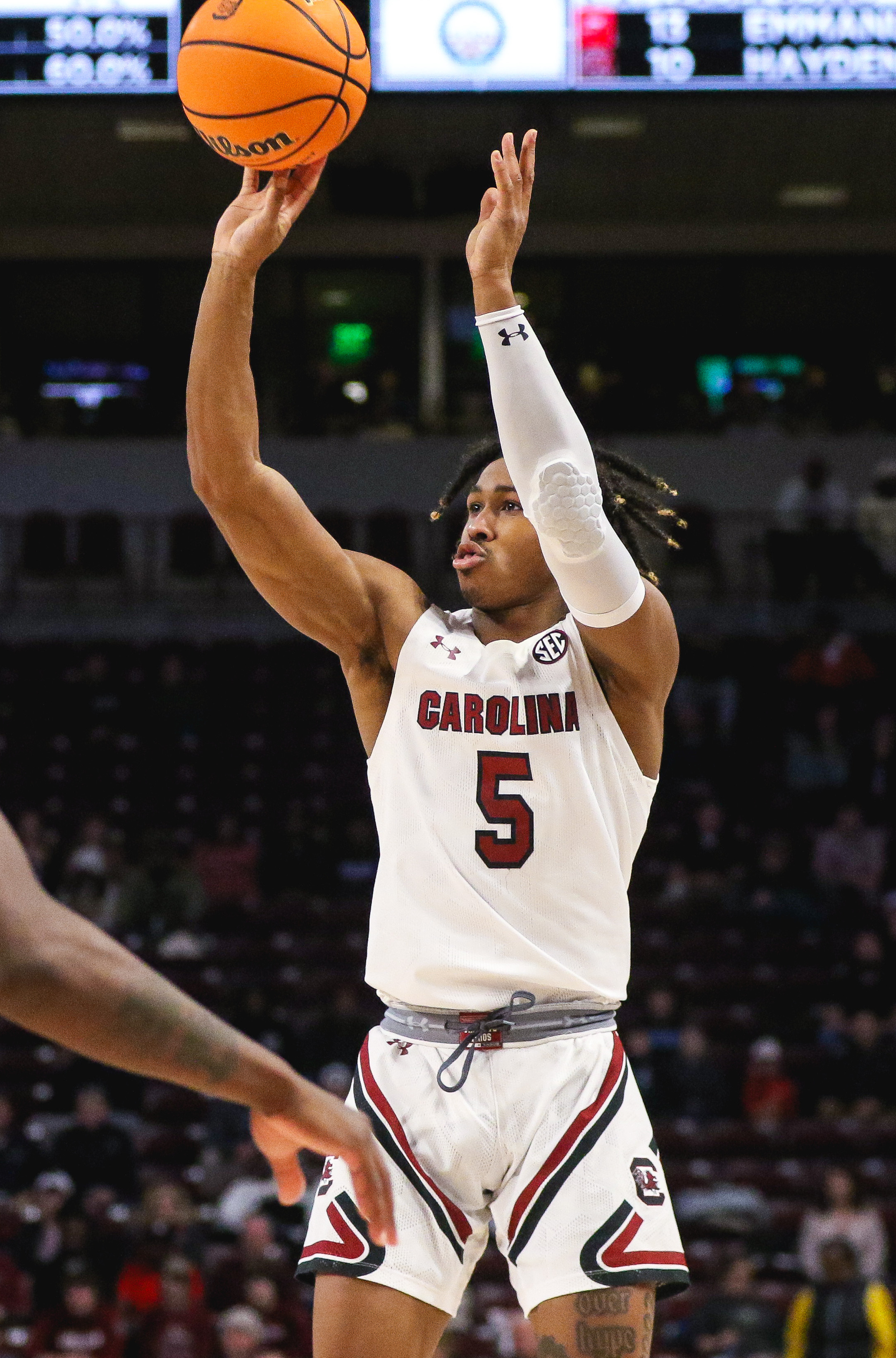
- Johnson with South Carolina in 2022

No. 5 – Coachella Valley Lakers
- Position: Point guard
- League: NBA G League

Personal information
- Born: September 21, 2002 (age 24) Cleveland, Ohio, U.S.
- Listed height: 6 ft 2 in (1.88 m)
- Listed weight: 184 lb (83 kg)

Career information
- High school: Garfield Heights (Garfield Heights, Ohio)
- College: Ohio State (2020–2022); South Carolina (2022–2024); Ohio State (2024–2025); South Carolina (2025–2026)
- NBA draft: 2026: undrafted
- Playing career: 2026–present

Career history
- 2026–present: Coachella Valley Lakers

Career highlights
- Second-team All-SEC (2024)
- Stats at NBA.com
- Stats at Basketball Reference

Demetrius "Meechie" Johnson Jr. (born September 21, 2002) is an American basketball player for the Coachella Valley Lakers of the NBA G League. He played college basketball for the Ohio State Buckeyes and South Carolina Gamecocks.

== Early life and high school ==
Johnson attended Garfield Heights High School. As a junior, he averaged 23 points per game before he tore his ACL. Coming out of high school, Johnson was rated as a four-star recruit, the 14th ranked point guard, and the 76th overall player in the class of 2021. He received offers from schools such as Louisville, Ohio State, Georgetown and Miami. Johnson committed to play college basketball for the Ohio State Buckeyes.

== College career ==
=== Ohio State ===
As a freshman in 2020–21 Johnson averaged 1.2 points, 0.4 rebounds and 0.2 assists in 17 games. On November 21, 2021, he scored eight points including the game-winning shots to help the Buckeyes upset #21 Seton Hall 79–76. During the 2021–22 season, Johnson averaged 4.4 points, 1.5 rebounds and 1.2 assists in 26 games. After the season, he entered his name into the NCAA transfer portal.

=== South Carolina ===
Johnson transferred to play for the South Carolina Gamecocks. On January 10, 2023, he scored 26 points in a win over Kentucky. In his first season with the Gamecocks, Johnson averaged 12.7 points, 3.7 rebounds and 3.6 assists per game while shooting 33 percent from three. He declared for the 2023 NBA draft after the season, but withdrew his name just a few days later.

On March 2, 2024, Johnson scored a team-high 25 points a win over Florida. In the first round of the 2024 NCAA tournament, he scored a team-high 24 points, while also adding three rebounds and assists, in an 87–73 loss to Oregon in the first round. Johnson finished the 2023–24 season starting in 33 games where he averaged 14.1 points, 4.1 rebounds and 2.9 assists per game, as he was named second-team all-SEC and led the Gamecocks to their first tournament appearance since 2017. After the season, he entered the NCAA transfer portal.

== Professional career ==
On September 18, 2026, Johnson signed an Exhibit 10 contract with the Los Angeles Lakers.

== Personal life ==
Johnson is close family friends with NBA superstar LeBron James and refers to him as an uncle.
