= Amare Bynum =

American basketball player

No. 1 – Ohio State Buckeyes
- Position: Power forward
- League: Big Ten Conference

Personal information
- Listed height: 6 ft 8 in (2.03 m)
- Listed weight: 245 lb (111 kg)

Career information
- High school: Link Academy (Branson, Missouri)
- College: Ohio State (2025–present)

Amare Bynum is a college basketball player for the Ohio State Buckeyes of the Big Ten Conference.

== Early life and high school ==
Bynum initially attended Omaha Bryan High School in Omaha, Nebraska, before transferring to Link Academy in Branson, Missouri for his senior season. Coming out of high school, he was rated as a four-star recruit, the 3rd overall player in Missouri, and the 46th overall player in the class of 2025 by 247Sports, and was committed to play college basketball for the Ohio State Buckeyes over offers from other schools such as Colorado, Iowa, LSU, Nebraska, and Xavier.

== College career ==
Bynum entered his freshman season in 2025 set to be a key contributor. On November 20, 2025, he recorded his first career double-double, totaling 12 points and 10 rebounds in a victory over Western Michigan. On December 13, Bynum notched 17 points, nine rebounds, three assists, and three blocks in a double-overtime win versus West Virginia. On December 20, he made his first career start against North Carolina. On January 11, 2026, Bynum put up a career-high 20 points in a victory against Washington.

== Personal life ==
Bynum is the son of former Iowa State basketball player, Omar Bynum.
