= John Mobley Jr. =

American basketball player (born 2005)

No. 0 – Ohio State Buckeyes
- Position: Point guard
- League: Big Ten Conference

Personal information
- Born: August 22, 2005 (age 21)
- Listed height: 6 ft 2 in (1.88 m)
- Listed weight: 190 lb (86 kg)

Career information
- High school: Bishop Gorman (Las Vegas, Nevada); Wasatch Academy (Mount Pleasant, Utah)
- College: Ohio State (2024–present)

John Paul "Juni" Mobley Jr. is an American college basketball player for the Ohio State Buckeyes of the Big Ten Conference.

== Early life and high school ==
Mobley Jr. attended Bishop Gorman High School in Las Vegas, Nevada, for three years before transferring to Wasatch Academy in Mount Pleasant, Utah, for his senior season. As a junior, he averaged 20.1 points, 4.0 rebounds, 4.0 assists, and 2.0 steals per game. As a senior, Mobley Jr. averaged a career-high 21.5 points per game. Coming out of high school, he was rated as a four-star recruit and committed to play college basketball for the Ohio State Buckeyes over offers from schools such as Arizona State, Creighton, LSU, USC and Xavier.

== College career ==
Mobley Jr. made his collegiate debut on November 4, 2024, going four for four from three and scoring 14 points in a win over Texas. On November 22, 2024, he scored a team-high 23 points, including five threes, in a win over Campbell.
