= Lin Wei (basketball) =

Chinese basketball player (born 2003)

Lin Wei 林葳
No. 23 – Oregon Ducks
- Position: Guard
- League: Big Ten Conference

Personal information
- Born: December 25, 2003 (age 22) Xiamen, Fujian, China
- Listed height: 6 ft 4 in (1.93 m)
- Listed weight: 205 lb (93 kg)

Career information
- College: Oregon (2025–present)
- Playing career: 2022–present

Career history
- 2022–2025: Nanjing Monkey Kings

Career highlights
- 2× CBA All-Star (2024, 2025); CBA All-Star Rookie (2023)

Lin Wei (Chinese: 林葳; born December 25, 2003) is a Chinese college basketball player currently plays for the Oregon Ducks of the Big Ten Conference. Standing at 6'4", Wei last played professionally for the Nanjing Monkey Kings of the Chinese Basketball Association.

== Early life ==
Wei was born on December 25, 2003, his native language is Mandarin. For primary school in 2009, Wei joined the Xiamen Experimental Primary School Jimei Branch in his hometown.

His basketball talent was discovered by Chen Jianping (Chinese: 陈剑平), a basketball coach employed by Jimei Youth Sports School, a public sports school run by Fujian government which Lin later joined. When Chen accepted a job offer from Nanjing Monkey Kings' youth system, Lin volunteered to follow him and subsequently joined Nanjing's youth team.

== Professional career ==
After 2 years in its youth system, Lin was promoted to the Nanjing Monkey Kings' CBA roster in 2022, playing for three seasons and was named a CBA All-Star in 2024 and 2025. Following the 2024–25 CBA season, Lin announced his departure from the Monkey Kings. He was drafted by the Texas Legends eighth overall in the 2025 G League International Draft.

== College career ==
=== Oregon Ducks ===
After getting cleared by the NCAA, on October 1, 2025, Lin committed to play college basketball at Oregon, becoming the first former Chinese professional basketball player to do so. According to Wei, he told The Athletic that the reason he wanted to go to Oregon was so that it gave him the best shot to go into the NBA, it also allowed him to get better at speaking English and developing his skills physically on the court. On January 5, 2026, in a 88–85 loss against the Rutgers Scarlet Knights, Lin scored a career high of 23 points, with six three pointers, five assists, two steals, and shot that tied the score with four seconds left in regulation. Following the season, Lin announced he would be entering the transfer portal. In June, it was reported he was in discussions with Michael Malone over a transfer to North Carolina. However, he returned to the Ducks.

== National team career ==
Lin was called up on several occasions to training camps for China's national under-16 and under-18 men's basketball teams, as well as the national second team. However, he only participated in internal practice games and did not make the final roster for any official international competition during this period.

== Career statistics ==
=== CBA ===
==== Regular season ====
Year	Team	GP	GS	MPG	FG%	3P%	FT%	RPG	APG	SPG	BPG	PPG
2022–23	Nanjing	39	6	34.2	.403	.357	.943	3.6	3.2	1.5	0.3	15.5
2023–24	Nanjing	41	37	35.6	.427	.381	.840	3.8	4.2	1.3	0.1	20.0
2024–25	Nanjing	34	22	34.6	.413	.346	.876	3.3	5.0	1.4	0.1	21.0
Career		114	65	34.3	.416	.364	.883	3.6	4.1	0.1	1.4	18.8

==== Playoffs ====
Year	Team	GP	GS	MPG	FG%	3P%	FT%	RPG	APG	SPG	BPG	PPG
2024–25	Nanjing	2	2	37.2	.435	.263	.941	6.5	11.0	0.0	1.5	30.5
Career		2	2	37.2	.435	.263	.941	6.5	11.0	0.0	1.5	30.5

=== College ===
Year	Team	GP	GS	MPG	FG%	3P%	FT%	RPG	APG	SPG	BPG	PPG
2025–26	Oregon	30	9	17.5	.344	.295	.824	.9	1.7	.4	.0	6.6
Career		30	9	17.5	.344	.295	.824	.9	1.7	.4	.0	6.6

== Personal life ==
Lin told The Athletic that his favorite American fast food restaurant is Chipotle.
