= Sean Stewart (basketball) =

American basketball player (born 2005)

No. 13 – Oregon Ducks
- Position: Power forward
- League: Big Ten Conference

Personal information
- Born: February 17, 2005 (age 21)
- Listed height: 6 ft 9 in (2.06 m)
- Listed weight: 220 lb (100 kg)

Career information
- High school: Windermere (Windermere, Florida); Montverde Academy (Montverde, Florida)
- College: Duke (2023–2024); Ohio State (2024–2025); Oregon (2025–present)

Career highlights
- McDonald's All-American (2023); Jordan Brand Classic (2023); Nike Hoop Summit (2023)
Medals
Men's basketball
Representing United States
FIBA Under-17 Basketball World Cup
Gold medal – first place	2022 Spain	Team

Sean Michael Stewart (born February 17, 2005) is an American college basketball player for the Oregon Ducks. He previously played for the Ohio State Buckeyes and the Duke Blue Devils.

== Early life and high school career ==
Stewart grew up in Windermere, Florida and initially attended Windermere High School. He averaged 20.5 points, 13.6 rebounds, 2.3 steals, and 4.6 blocks per game as a junior. Stewart transferred to Montverde Academy in Montverde, Florida before the start of his senior year. Stewart was selected to play in the 2023 McDonald's All-American Boys Game. He won the game's slam dunk competition.

=== Recruiting ===
Stewart was considered a five-star recruit by Rivals, and a four-star recruit by ESPN and 247Sports. On December 23, 2021, he committed to playing college basketball for Duke over offers from Michigan, Georgetown, and Ohio State.

College recruiting
Name	Hometown	School	Height	Weight	Commit date
Sean Stewart; PF	Windermere, FL	Montverde Academy (FL)	6 ft 8 in (2.03 m)	230 lb (100 kg)	Dec 23, 2021
Sean Stewart; PF	Recruit ratings: Rivals: 247Sports: ESPN: (89)				
Overall recruit ranking: Rivals: 17 247Sports: 22 ESPN: 19
Note: In many cases, Scout, Rivals, 247Sports, On3, and ESPN may conflict in their listings of height and weight.; In these cases, the average was taken. ESPN grades are on a 100-point scale.; Sources: "Duke 2023 Basketball Commitments". Rivals.; "2023 Duke Blue Devils Recruiting Class". ESPN.; "2023 Team Ranking". Rivals.

== College career ==
Stewart enrolled at Duke University in June 2023 and took part in the Blue Devils' summer practices. In October 2023, Stewart set the Duke record for the standing vertical leap (36 inches), a mark previously held by Zion Williamson. In his freshman season, Stewart played limited minutes and averaged 2.6 points and 3.2 rebounds per game as a reserve behind Mark Mitchell and Kyle Filipowski. On April 19, 2024, Stewart entered the transfer portal.

On May 3, 2024, Stewart transferred to Ohio State.

On May 8, 2025, Stewart transferred for a second time, transferring to Oregon

== National team career ==
Stewart played for the United States under-17 basketball team at the 2022 FIBA Under-17 Basketball World Cup.

== Personal life ==
Stewart's father, Michael Stewart, played college basketball at California and played in the National Basketball Association for eight seasons. His grandfather, Mike Stewart, played collegiately at Santa Clara and professionally overseas.
