= 2026–27 Big East Conference men's basketball season =

- League: NCAA Division I
- Sport: Basketball
- Teams: 11
- TV partner(s): Fox, FS1, NBC, Peacock, TNT, TruTV, ESPN+

Regular Season

Tournament
- Venue: Madison Square Garden, New York City, New York

Basketball seasons
- ← 2025–26 2027–28 →

2026–27 Big East men's basketball standings
	Conf.				Overall
Team	W		L	PCT	W		L	PCT
Georgetown	0	–	0	–	4	–	0	1.000
DePaul	0	–	0	–	4	–	0	1.000
No. 13 St. John's	0	–	0	–	4	–	0	1.000
No. 3 UConn	0	–	0	–	4	–	0	1.000
Xavier	0	–	0	–	4	–	0	1.000
Creighton	0	–	0	–	3	–	1	.750
Providence	0	–	0	–	3	–	1	.750
Seton Hall	0	–	0	–	3	–	1	.750
Villanova	0	–	0	–	3	–	1	.750
Butler	0	–	0	–	2	–	2	.500
Marquette	0	–	0	–	2	–	2	.500
† 2027 Big East tournament winner As of November 16, 2026; Rankings from AP poll

The 2026–27 Big East men's basketball season is the upcoming season for Big East Conference basketball teams that will begin with practices and exhibition games in October 2026, followed by the start of the 2026–27 NCAA Division I men's basketball season in November 2026. Conference play will begin in December 2026 and end in March 2027.

== Head coaches ==
=== Coaching changes ===
==== Butler ====
On March 16, 2026, after four seasons in his second stint, head coach Thad Matta announced his retirement from coaching, although remaining with the Bulldogs as a special assistant to the university president and athletic director. On March 25, the school named Ronald Nored as the team's next head coach. He was most recently an assistant coach with the Atlanta Hawks and a player in the Bulldogs' National Runners-up teams in 2010 and 2011.

==== Creighton ====
On March 23, 2026, long-time head coach Greg McDermott announced his retirement, remaining with the team until the end of their College Basketball Crown run. Associate head coach Alan Huss, who had been re-hired from High Point in 2025, was promoted to head coach, as his position stipulated he would become the next head coach when McDermott retired.

==== Providence ====
On March 13, 2026, head coach Kim English was fired after three seasons. On March 22, South Florida head coach Bryan Hodgson was named as the team's next head coach.

=== Coaches ===
Team	Head coach	Previous job	Years at school	Overall record	Big East record	Big East titles	NCAA Tournaments	NCAA Final Fours	NCAA Championships
Butler	Ronald Nored	Atlanta Hawks (Asst.)	1	0–0 (–)	0–0 (–)	0	0	0	0
UConn	Dan Hurley	Rhode Island	9	164–46 (.781)	86–33 (.723)	1	6	3	2
Creighton	Alan Huss	Creighton (Assoc.)	1	0–0 (–)	0–0 (–)	0	0	0	0
DePaul	Chris Holtmann	Ohio State	3	30–36 (.455)	12–28 (.300)	0	0	0	0
Georgetown	Ed Cooley	Providence	4	42–57 (.424)	16–44 (.267)	0	0	0	0
Marquette	Shaka Smart	Texas	6	110–61 (.643)	62–37 (.626)	1	4	0	0
Providence	Bryan Hodgson	South Florida	1	0–0 (–)	0–0 (–)	0	0	0	0
St. John's	Rick Pitino	Iona	4	81–25 (.764)	47–13 (.783)	2	2	0	0
Seton Hall	Shaheen Holloway	St. Peter's	5	70–65 (.519)	35–45 (.438)	0	0	0	0
Villanova	Kevin Willard	Maryland	2	24–9 (.727)	15–5 (.750)	0	1	0	0
Xavier	Richard Pitino	New Mexico	2	15–18 (.455)	6–14 (.300)	0	0	0	0

Notes:

- All records, appearances, titles, etc. are from time with current school only.
- Year at school includes 2026–27 season.
- Overall and Big East records are from time at current school only and are through the beginning of the season.
- Hurley's AAC records not included since team began play in the Big East.

== Preseason ==
=== Preseason Big East poll ===
Prior to the conference's annual media day, conference standings were projected by panel of writers.

Rank	Team	Points
1.	UConn	98 (8)
2.	St. John's	90 (2)
3.	Villanova	81
4.	Marquette	73 (1)
5.	Providence	59
6.	Xavier	54
7.	Creighton	80
8.	DePaul	32
9.	Seton Hall	31
10.	Georgetown	27
11.	Butler	13
(first place votes)

=== Preseason All-Big East ===
A select media panel named a preseason All-Big East team and player of the year.

Honor	Recipient
Preseason Player of the Year	Silas Demary Jr., UConn
Preseason Freshman of the Year	Colben Landrew, UConn
Preseason All-Big East First Team
Preseason All-Big East First Team	Braylon Mullins, UConn*
Preseason All-Big East First Team	Nigel James Jr., Marquette*
Preseason All-Big East First Team	Ian Jackson, St. John's
Preseason All-Big East First Team	Tounde Yessoufou, St. John's*
Preseason All-Big East First Team	Tyler Perkins, Villanova
Preseason All-Big East Second Team
Preseason All-Big East Second Team	Na'jai Hines, UConn
Preseason All-Big East Second Team	Royce Parham, Marquette
Preseason All-Big East Second Team	Miles Byrd, Providence
Preseason All-Big East Second Team	Kwame Evans Jr., Villanova
Preseason All-Big East Second Team	Devin Royal, Villanova
Preseason All-Big East Third Team
Preseason All-Big East Third Team	Oswin Erhunmwunse, Creighton
Preseason All-Big East Third Team	Jackson McAndrew, Creighton
Preseason All-Big East Third Team	Layden Blocker, DePaul
Preseason All-Big East Third Team	Sananda Fru, Marquette
Preseason All-Big East Third Team	Jovan Milicevic, Xavier
Preseason All-Big East Third Team	Mike Nwoko, Xavier

* Denotes unanimous selection

=== Preseason All-American teams ===
Player	AP	CBS	USA Today	Sports Illustrated	SB Nation	Sporting News
Silas Demary Jr., UConn	RV	2nd team		2nd team		
Braylon Mullins, UConn	RV					

== Regular season ==
=== Rankings ===
Legend
	Improvement in ranking
	Drop in ranking
	Not ranked previous week
RV	Received votes but were not ranked in Top 25 of poll
(Italics)	Number of first place votes

		Pre/ Wk 1	Wk 2	Wk 3	Wk 4	Wk 5	Wk 6	Wk 7	Wk 8	Wk 9	Wk 10	Wk 11	Wk 12	Wk 13	Wk 14	Wk 15	Wk 16	Wk 17	Wk 18	Wk 19	Wk 20	Final
Butler	AP																					
Butler	C																					
UConn	AP	4	4	3																		
UConn	C	5	4	2																		
Creighton	AP		RV																			
Creighton	C	RV																				
DePaul	AP																					
DePaul	C																					
Georgetown	AP																					
Georgetown	C																					
Marquette	AP	RV	RV																			
Marquette	C		RV	RV																		
Providence	AP																					
Providence	C																					
Seton Hall	AP																					
Seton Hall	C																					
St. John's	AP	13	13	13																		
St. John's	C	14	13	13																		
Villanova	AP	RV																				
Villanova	C	RV	RV																			
Xavier	AP			RV																		
Xavier	C																					

=== Early Season Tournaments ===
Team	Tournament	Finish
Creighton	Players Era Festival (Players Era 16)	
DePaul	Fort Myers Tip-Off (Beach Division)	
Georgetown	Rady Children's Invitational	
Marquette	Battle 4 Atlantis (Bracket 2)	
Providence	Maui Invitational	
St. John's	Players Era Festival (Players Era 16)	
Seton Hall	Bahamas Championship	
Xavier	Battle 4 Atlantis (Bracket 1)	

=== Big East Players of the Week ===
Throughout the conference regular season, the Big East offices named one or two players of the week and one or two freshmen of the week each Monday.

Week	Date	Player of the week	School	Freshman of the week	School
1	November 9, 2026	Jaland Lowe	Georgetown	Colben Landrew	UConn
2	November 16, 2026	Vince Iwuchukwu	Georgetown	Luigi Suigo	Villanova
