= 2026–27 UConn Huskies men's basketball team =

American college basketball season

2026–27 UConn Huskies men's basketball
- Conference: Big East Conference

Ranking
- Coaches: No. 2
- AP: No. 3
- Record: 4–1 (0–0 Big East)
- Head coach: Dan Hurley (9th season)
- Associate head coach: Kimani Young (9th season)
- Assistant coaches: Mike Nardi (2nd season); Mike Pegues (1st season)
- Home arena: Harry A. Gampel Pavilion; PeoplesBank Arena

2026–27 Big East men's basketball standings
	Conf.				Overall
Team	W		L	PCT	W		L	PCT
Georgetown	0	–	0	–	6	–	0	1.000
DePaul	0	–	0	–	5	–	0	1.000
No. 13 St. John's	0	–	0	–	5	–	0	1.000
Seton Hall	0	–	0	–	5	–	1	.833
Xavier	0	–	0	–	5	–	1	.833
Creighton	0	–	0	–	4	–	1	.800
Providence	0	–	0	–	4	–	1	.800
No. 3 UConn	0	–	0	–	4	–	1	.800
Butler	0	–	0	–	4	–	2	.667
Villanova	0	–	0	–	4	–	2	.667
Marquette	0	–	0	–	3	–	2	.600
† 2027 Big East tournament winner As of November 22, 2026; Rankings from AP poll

The 2026–27 UConn Huskies men's basketball team represents the University of Connecticut in the 2026–27 NCAA Division I men's basketball season. The Huskies are led by ninth-year head coach Dan Hurley in the team's seventh season since their return to the Big East Conference. The Huskies play their home games at the Harry A. Gampel Pavilion on-campus in Storrs, Connecticut and the PeoplesBank Arena in Hartford, Connecticut.

== Previous Season ==
The Huskies finished the season 34–6, 17–3 in Big East play, to finish 2nd in the regular season conference standings. They defeated Xavier 93–68 in the Big East tournament quarterfinals, Georgetown 67–51 in the semifinals, before falling to St. John's 72–52. UConn received an at-large bid to the NCAA tournament, where they were awarded a #2 seed. The Huskies advanced to the championship game, where they sought to maintain their perfect 6–0 record in national championship games. However, they came up short, falling to Michigan 69–63.

== Offseason ==
On March 26, 2026, assistant coach Luke Murray was hired as the head coach of the Boston College Eagles. Murray remained with the Huskies throughout the 2026 NCAA tournament.

On April 19, despite being projected as a first-round pick in the NBA Draft, guard Braylon Mullins opted to return for his Sophomore season. A day later, on April 20, the team announced that guard Solo Ball had undergone wrist surgery and will miss the entire season. Ball will take a medical redshirt and eye to return in 2027–28.

=== Departures ===
UConn Departures
Name	Number	Pos.	Height	Weight	Year	Hometown	Reason for Departure
Malachi Smith	0	G	6'1"	180	(redshirt) Senior	Bronx, NY	Graduated
Jaylin Stewart	3	F	6'7"	225	Junior	Seattle, WA	Transferred to SMU
Dwayne Koroma	4	F	6'8"	212	(redshirt) Senior	Berlin, Germany	Graduated
Tarris Reed	5	C	6'11"	265	Senior	St. Louis, MO	Graduated/2026 NBA Draft; Selected 26th overall by Denver Nuggets
Jacob Furphy	7	G	6'6"	205	Freshman	Smithton, Australia	Transferred to Boston College
Alec Millender	9	G	6'1"	190	Graduate Student	Glenwood, IL	Graduated
Rrezon Elezaj	10	C	7'2"	225	Freshman	Istanbul, Turkey	Transferred to Appalachian State
Alex Karaban	11	F	6'8"	230	(redshirt) Senior	Southborough, MA	Graduated/2026 NBA Draft; Selected 29th overall by Cleveland Cavaliers
Eric Reibe	12	C	7'1"	260	Freshman	Hanover, Germany	Transferred to USC
Uroš Paunović	77	G	6'3"	190	Junior	Belgrade, Serbia	Signed with KK Igokea

=== Incoming transfers ===
UConn incoming transfers
Name	Number	Pos.	Height	Weight	Year	Hometown	Previous school
Nikolas Khamenia	4	F	6'8"	210	Sophomore	Studio City, CA	Duke
Jaye Nash	7	G	6'3"	195	Junior	Memphis, TN	Jacksonville State
Na'jai Hines	9	F	6'10"	230	Sophomore	Garner, NC	Seton Hall
Oskar Giltay	18	F	6'10"	235	Sophomore	Bilzen, Belgium	Stanford
Nils Machowski	21	G	6'3"	183	Senior	Berlin, Germany	Wofford
Elmir Džafic	29	C	7'0"	285	Sophomore	Tuzla, Bosnia and Herzegovina	Arkansas
Isaiah Shaw	33	F	6'8"	200	(redshirt) Senior	Phoenix, AZ	Northern Arizona

=== Recruiting Classes ===
==== 2026 Recruiting Class ====
College recruiting
Name	Hometown	School	Height	Weight	Commit date
Colben Landrew; SG	Alabaster, AL	Wheeler (GA) High School	6 ft 6 in (1.98 m)	225 lb (102 kg)	Oct 25, 2025
Colben Landrew; SG	Recruit ratings: Rivals: 247Sports: ESPN: (89)				
Junior County; PG	Salt Lake City, UT	Wasatch Academy	6 ft 4 in (1.93 m)	180 lb (82 kg)	Oct 2, 2025
Junior County; PG	Recruit ratings: Rivals: 247Sports: ESPN: (88)				
Egor Amosov; SF	Samara, Russia	Real Madrid Liga U	6 ft 8 in (2.03 m)	236 lb (107 kg)	Jul 6, 2026
Egor Amosov; SF	Recruit ratings: No ratings found				
Overall recruit ranking: Rivals: 10 247Sports: 28 ESPN: 25
Note: In many cases, Scout, Rivals, 247Sports, On3, and ESPN may conflict in their listings of height and weight.; In these cases, the average was taken. ESPN grades are on a 100-point scale.; Sources: "2026 UConn Basketball Commitments". Rivals.; "2026 Team Ranking". Rivals.

== Roster ==
2026–27 UConn Huskies men's basketball team
Players
Coaches

Pos.	#	Name	Height	Weight	Year	Previous school	Hometown
G	0	Junior County	6 ft 5 in (1.96 m)	205 lb (93 kg)	Fr	Wasatch Academy	Highland Park, Utah
G	1	Solo Ball (injured)	6 ft 4 in (1.93 m)	190 lb (86 kg)	Sr	Brewster Academy	Leesburg, Virginia
F	3	Colben Landrew	6 ft 6 in (1.98 m)	236 lb (107 kg)	Fr	Wheeler (GA) High School	Alabaster, Alabama
F	4	Nikolas Khamenia (injured)	6 ft 8 in (2.03 m)	225 lb (102 kg)	So	Duke	Tarzana, California
G	5	Silas Demary Jr.	6 ft 4 in (1.93 m)	191 lb (87 kg)	Sr	Georgia	Raleigh, North Carolina
G	7	Jaye Nash	6 ft 2 in (1.88 m)	193 lb (88 kg)	Jr	Jacksonville State	Memphis, Tennessee
C	9	Na'jai Hines	6 ft 11 in (2.11 m)	278 lb (126 kg)	So	Seton Hall	Garner, North Carolina
F	13	Jacob Ross	6 ft 6 in (1.98 m)	203 lb (92 kg)	So	SoCal Academy	Bristow, Virginia
F	17	Egor Amosov	6 ft 8 in (2.03 m)	236 lb (107 kg)	Fr	Real Madrid Liga U	Samara, Russia
C	18	Oskar Giltay	6 ft 11 in (2.11 m)	240 lb (109 kg)	So	Stanford	Bilzen, Belgium
G	21	Nils Machowski	6 ft 4 in (1.93 m)	170 lb (77 kg)	Sr	Wofford	Berlin, Germany
F	23	Jayden Ross	6 ft 7 in (2.01 m)	210 lb (95 kg)	Sr	Long Island Lutheran	Bristow, Virginia
G	24	Braylon Mullins	6 ft 6 in (1.98 m)	198 lb (90 kg)	So	Greenfield-Central	Greenfield, Indiana
C	29	Elmir Džafić	7 ft 0 in (2.13 m)	176 lb (80 kg)	So	Arkansas	Tinja Donja, Bosnia and Herzegovina
G	33	Isaiah Shaw	6 ft 8 in (2.03 m)	207 lb (94 kg)	RS Sr	Northern Arizona	Phoenix, Arizona

Head coach

- Dan Hurley (Seton Hall)

Assistant coach(es)

- Kimani Young (UTEP)
- Mike Nardi (Villanova)
- Mike Pegues (Delaware)

Legend

- (C) Team captain
- (S) Suspended
- (I) Ineligible
- (W) Walk-on
- Injured
- Current redshirt

Roster

== Schedule and results ==
Date time, TV	Rank^{#}	Opponent^{#}	Result	Record	High points	High rebounds	High assists	Site (attendance) city, state
Exhibition
October 13, 2026*; 7:00 p.m., NBC Sports Boston		vs. Syracuse; Rivalry / Hall of Fame Exhibition	W 72–52	—	17 – Hines	8 – Tied	3 – Tied	Mohegan Sun Arena (6,862); Uncasville, CT
October 20, 2026*; 7:00 p.m., B1G+	No. 4	at No. 6 Michigan State	W 78–70	—	19 – Khamenia	6 – Tied	5 – Jay. Ross	Breslin Center (14,797); East Lansing, MI
October 27, 2026*; 7:00 p.m., WFSB	No. 4	Purdue	W 76–53	—	15 – Landrew	11 – Khamenia	5 – Demary Jr.	PeoplesBank Arena (15,495); Hartford, CT
Non-conference regular season
November 2, 2026*; 9:00 p.m., Peacock / NBCSN	No. 4	Gardner–Webb	W 86–46	1–0	20 – Mullins	12 – Hines	8 – Demary Jr.	PeoplesBank Arena (15,495); Hartford, CT
November 6, 2026*; 8:00 p.m., TNT	No. 4	vs. No. 16 Michigan; Naismith Hall of Fame Series Boston	W 85–77	2–0	23 – Mullins	8 – Landrew	4 – Demary Jr.	TD Garden (18,053); Boston, MA
November 9, 2026*; 7:00 p.m., truTV	No. 4	Wagner	W 83–41	3–0	18 – Demary Jr.	8 – Hines	4 – Tied	Harry A. Gampel Pavilion (10,244); Storrs, CT
November 13, 2026*; 7:30 p.m., TNT	No. 4	Ohio State	W 84–68	4–0	22 – Mullins	6 – Giltay	9 – Demary Jr.	PeoplesBank Arena (15,495); Hartford, CT
November 18, 2026*; 9:00 p.m., FS1	No. 3	at No. 12 Arizona	L 79–85	4–1	29 – Mullins	10 – Landrew	6 – Demary Jr.	McKale Center (14,688); Tucson, AZ
November 25, 2026*; 7:00 p.m., Prime Video		vs. Duke						T-Mobile Arena; Paradise, NV
November 30, 2026*; 6:30 p.m., FS1		Rider						Harry A. Gampel Pavilion; Storrs, CT
December 4, 2026*; 7:00 p.m., FOX		vs. Illinois						United Center; Chicago, IL
December 8, 2026*; 7:00 p.m., truTV		Mississippi Valley State						Harry A. Gampel Pavilion; Storrs, CT
December 12, 2026*; 8:00 p.m., FOX		Kansas						Harry A. Gampel Pavilion; Storrs, CT
December 15, 2026*; 7:00 p.m., truTV		Delaware State						PeoplesBank Arena; Hartford, CT
December 20, 2026*; 3:00 p.m., ESPN		vs. Virginia; SentinelOne Showdown						Madison Square Garden; New York, NY
Big East regular season
December 23, 2026; 3:00 p.m., Peacock / NBCSN		Georgetown; Rivalry						PeoplesBank Arena; Hartford, CT
December 31, 2026; 7:00 p.m., FS1		at Butler						Hinkle Fieldhouse; Indianapolis, IN
January 3, 2027; 2:00 p.m., NBC		at Creighton						CHI Health Center Omaha; Omaha, NE
January 6, 2027; 6:30 p.m., FS1		DePaul						Harry A. Gampel Pavilion; Storrs, CT
January 9, 2027; 7:00 p.m., Peacock / NBCSN		at Seton Hall						Prudential Center; Newark, NJ
January 12, 2027; 7:00 p.m., TNT		Marquette						Harry A. Gampel Pavilion; Storrs, CT
January 16, 2027; 12:00 p.m., FOX / FS1		Xavier						Harry A. Gampel Pavilion; Storrs, CT
January 20, 2027; 7:00 p.m., Peacock / NBCSN		at Providence						Amica Mutual Pavilion; Providence, RI
January 23, 2027; 12:00 p.m., TNT		Butler						PeoplesBank Arena; Hartford, CT
January 26, 2027; 8:00 p.m., FS1		at Georgetown; Rivalry						Capital One Arena; Washington, D.C.
January 29, 2027; 8:00 p.m., FOX		at St. John's						Madison Square Garden; New York, NY
February 3, 2027; 7:00 p.m., Peacock / NBCSN		Villanova						PeoplesBank Arena; Hartford, CT
February 7, 2027; 4:30 p.m., FOX		Creighton						PeoplesBank Arena; Hartford, CT
February 10, 2027; 8:30 p.m., FS1		at DePaul						Wintrust Arena; Chicago, IL
February 14, 2027; 12:00 p.m., FOX		at Villanova						Xfinity Mobile Arena; Philadelphia, PA
February 17, 2027; 8:00 p.m., Peacock		Seton Hall						Harry A. Gampel Pavilion; Storrs, CT
February 20, 2027; 2:30 p.m., FOX		at Marquette						Fiserv Forum; Milwaukee, WI
February 27, 2027; 8:00 p.m., FOX		Providence						Harry A. Gampel Pavilion; Storrs, CT
March 2, 2027; 7:30 p.m., TNT		St. John's						PeoplesBank Arena; Hartford, CT
March 6, 2027; 2:30 p.m., TNT		at Xavier						Cintas Center; Cincinnati, OH
*Non-conference game. ^{#}Rankings from AP poll. (#) Tournament seedings in parentheses. All times are in Eastern Time.

== Rankings ==
Ranking movements Legend: ██ Increase in ranking ██ Decrease in ranking
	Week																				
Poll	Pre	1	2	3	4	5	6	7	8	9	10	11	12	13	14	15	16	17	18	19	Final
AP	4	4	3																		
Coaches	5	4	2																		
