= 2026–27 Xavier Musketeers men's basketball team =

American college basketball season

2026–27 Xavier Musketeers men's basketball
- Conference: Big East Conference
- Record: 5–1 (0–0 Big East)
- Head coach: Richard Pitino (2nd season)
- Associate head coach: Isaac Chew
- Assistant coaches: Tarvish Felton; Kareem Richardson; Greg Youncofski
- Home arena: Cintas Center

2026–27 Big East men's basketball standings
	Conf.				Overall
Team	W		L	PCT	W		L	PCT
Georgetown	0	–	0	–	6	–	0	1.000
DePaul	0	–	0	–	5	–	0	1.000
No. 13 St. John's	0	–	0	–	5	–	0	1.000
Seton Hall	0	–	0	–	5	–	1	.833
Xavier	0	–	0	–	5	–	1	.833
Creighton	0	–	0	–	4	–	1	.800
Providence	0	–	0	–	4	–	1	.800
No. 3 UConn	0	–	0	–	4	–	1	.800
Butler	0	–	0	–	4	–	2	.667
Villanova	0	–	0	–	4	–	2	.667
Marquette	0	–	0	–	3	–	2	.600
† 2027 Big East tournament winner As of November 22, 2026; Rankings from AP poll

The 2026–27 Xavier Musketeers men's basketball team represents Xavier University during the 2026–27 NCAA Division I men's basketball season as a member of the Big East Conference. The Musketeers, led by second-year head coach Richard Pitino, play their home games at the Cintas Center in Cincinnati, Ohio.

== Previous season ==
The Musketeers finished the 2025–26 season 15–18, 6–14 in Big East play. As the No. 10 seed in the Big East tournament, they defeated No. 7 seed Marquette in the first round before losing to No. 2 seed UConn in the quarterfinals.

== Offseason ==
=== Coaching changes ===
On April 9, 2026, South Florida announced that Xavier assistant coach Dante Jackson would join the staff of former Musketeers head coach Chris Mack. Jackson, a former Xavier player, had been an assistant coach at Xavier since 2018, after serving as a graduate assistant under Mack from 2012 to 2014.

On April 17, 2026, Pitino hired Greg Youncofski as an assistant coach to complete his staff for the 2026–27 season. Youncofski had spent the previous two seasons at St. John's under Rick Pitino, joining as director of operations in June 2024 before being elevated to assistant coach during the 2025–26 season. He was previously an assistant coach at Loyola Marymount from 2020 to 2024 and at Cincinnati in 2018–19.

=== Departures ===
Name	Number	Pos.	Height	Weight	Year	Hometown	Reason for departure
Roddie Anderson III	0	G	6'3"	190	Senior	Huntington Beach, CA	Transferred to Seton Hall
Malik Messina-Moore	1	G	6'4"	200	Senior	Ventura, CA	Transferred to Illinois State
All Wright	3	G	6'3"	190	Sophomore	Durango, Mexico	Transferred to Loyola Marymount
Isaiah Walker	7	G	6'5"	205	(redshirt) Senior	Wyoming, OH	Graduated
Luke Naser	8	G	6'2"	179	Sophomore	Las Vegas, NV	
Mier Panoam	9	G	6'2"	200	Junior	Anchorage, AK	Transferred to UT Arlington
Tre Carroll	12	F	6'8"	235	Graduate student	Punta Gorda, FL	Graduated/undrafted in 2026 NBA draft; signed and waived by the Charlotte Hornets; joined the Greensboro Swarm
Anthony Robinson	21	F/C	6'10"	252	(redshirt) Sophomore	Atlanta, GA	Transferred to Pepperdine
Pape N'Diaye	22	F	7'0"	230	Sophomore	Abidjan, Côte d'Ivoire	Transferred to Kansas State
Ian Sabourin	31	F	6'4"	210	Junior	Hamilton, OH	

=== Incoming transfers ===
Name	Num	Pos.	Height	Weight	Year	Hometown	Previous school
Mike Nwoko	1	F	6'10"	260	Senior	Toronto, ON	LSU
Tru Washington	3	G	6'4"	210	Senior	South Phoenix, AZ	Miami (FL)
Rolyns Aligbe	8	F	6'9"	243	Junior	Brooklyn Park, MN	Southern Illinois
Ruben Dominguez	9	G	6'6"	214	Senior	Puerto Real, Spain	Texas A&M
Chance Westry	11	G	6'6"	205	Senior	Harrisburg, PA	UAB
Braden Appelhans	12	G	6'6"	200	Senior	Blue Springs, MO	Drake
Nikos Chitikoudis	16	F	6'9"	235	Senior	Thessaloniki, Greece	Robert Morris

=== Recruiting class ===
College recruiting
Name	Hometown	School	Height	Weight	Commit date
Kalek House; SG	Scottsdale, AZ	AZ Compass Prep	6 ft 3 in (1.91 m)	200 lb (91 kg)	Sep 15, 2025
Kalek House; SG	Recruit ratings: Scout: Rivals: 247Sports: (NR)				
Asher Elson; PF	Brooklyn, NY	Overtime Elite	6 ft 11 in (2.11 m)	200 lb (91 kg)	Nov 19, 2025
Asher Elson; PF	Recruit ratings: Scout: Rivals: 247Sports: (NR)				
Gedeon Basson; CG	Douala, Cameroon	Victory Rock Prep	6 ft 2 in (1.88 m)	218 lb (99 kg)	Feb 12, 2026
Gedeon Basson; CG	Recruit ratings: Scout: Rivals: 247Sports: (NR)				
Overall recruit ranking:
Note: In many cases, Scout, Rivals, 247Sports, On3, and ESPN may conflict in their listings of height and weight.; In these cases, the average was taken. ESPN grades are on a 100-point scale.; Sources: "Xavier 2026 Basketball Commitments". Rivals.; "2026 Xavier Musketeers Recruiting Class". ESPN.; "2026 Team Ranking". Rivals.; "Xavier 2026 Basketball Commits". 247Sports.

== Roster ==
2026–27 Xavier Musketeers men's basketball team
Players
Coaches

Pos.	#	Name	Height	Weight	Year	Previous school	Hometown
F	6	Harrison Aligbe	6 ft 8 in (2.03 m)	220 lb (100 kg)	Fr	St. Andrew's (RI)	Brooklyn Park, MN
F	8	Rolyns Aligbe	6 ft 9 in (2.06 m)	243 lb (110 kg)	Jr	Southern Illinois	Brooklyn Park, MN
G	12	Braden Appelhans	6 ft 6 in (1.98 m)	200 lb (91 kg)	Sr	Drake	Blue Springs, MO
G	17	Gedeon Basson	6 ft 2 in (1.88 m)	218 lb (99 kg)	Fr	Victory Rock Prep (FL)	Douala, Cameroon
G	4	Filip Borovićanin	6 ft 9 in (2.06 m)	227 lb (103 kg)	GS	Arizona / New Mexico	Belgrade, Serbia
F	16	Nikos Chitikoudis	6 ft 9 in (2.06 m)	235 lb (107 kg)	Sr	Robert Morris	Thessaloniki, Greece
G	9	Ruben Dominguez	6 ft 6 in (1.98 m)	214 lb (97 kg)	Sr	Texas A&M	Puerto Real, Spain
F	7	Asher Elson	6 ft 11 in (2.11 m)	200 lb (91 kg)	Fr	Overtime Elite	Brooklyn, NY
G	2	Kalek House	6 ft 3 in (1.91 m)	200 lb (91 kg)	Fr	AZ Compass Prep	Scottsdale, AZ
F	24	Jovan Milicevic	6 ft 10 in (2.08 m)	241 lb (109 kg)	Jr	New Mexico	Toronto, ON
F	1	Mike Nwoko	6 ft 10 in (2.08 m)	260 lb (118 kg)	Sr	LSU	Toronto, ON
F	0	Gabriel Pozzato	6 ft 7 in (2.01 m)	207 lb (94 kg)	RS So	Evansville	Novara, Italy
F	20	Henry Thole (W)	6 ft 7 in (2.01 m)	230 lb (104 kg)	Jr	Villa Madonna Academy	Union, KY
G	3	Tru Washington	6 ft 4 in (1.93 m)	210 lb (95 kg)	Sr	Miami (FL)	South Phoenix, AZ
C	15	Kason Westphal	7 ft 1 in (2.16 m)	280 lb (127 kg)	RS Fr	Salida HS	Salida, CO
G	11	Chance Westry	6 ft 6 in (1.98 m)	205 lb (93 kg)	Sr	UAB	Harrisburg, PA
G	25	Michael Wolf (W)	6 ft 1 in (1.85 m)	195 lb (88 kg)	GS	Bridgton Academy	Greenwood Village, CO

Head coach

- Richard Pitino (Providence)

Assistant coach(es)

- Isaac Chew (Avila)
- Tarvish Felton (Southern Utah)
- Kareem Richardson (Evansville)
- Greg Youncofski (Kansas)

Legend

- (C) Team captain
- (S) Suspended
- (I) Ineligible
- (W) Walk-on
- Injured
- Current redshirt

Roster
Last update: 2026-11-21

== Schedule and results ==
Date time, TV	Rank^{#}	Opponent^{#}	Result	Record	High points	High rebounds	High assists	Site (attendance) city, state
Exhibition
October 7, 2026*; 5:30 p.m.		vs. Dayton; CareSource Invitational	W 82–76		19 – Nwoko	11 – Nwoko	4 – Westry	Lindner Family Tennis Center (11,017); Mason, OH
October 15, 2026*; 7:00 p.m., SEC Network+		at Tennessee	W 86–70		17 – Chitikoudis	7 – Tied	12 – Washington	Thompson–Boling Arena; Knoxville, TN
October 23, 2026*; 7:00 p.m.		Kent State	W 76–70		17 – Milicevic	9 – Borovićanin	10 – Borovićanin	Cintas Center (10,212); Cincinnati, OH
Non-conference regular season
November 2, 2026*; 7:00 p.m., ESPN+		Mount St. Mary's	W 97–52	1–0	14 – Milicevic	11 – Chitikoudis	7 – Borovićanin	Cintas Center (9,343); Cincinnati, OH
November 6, 2026*; 7:00 p.m., ESPN+		Eastern Michigan	W 76–53	2–0	13 – Westry	6 – Tied	7 – House	Cintas Center (9,588); Cincinnati, OH
November 10, 2026*; 7:00 p.m., ESPN+		Detroit Mercy	W 100–55	3–0	17 – Nwoko	10 – Chitikoudis	6 – Milicevic	Cintas Center (9,346); Cincinnati, OH
November 13, 2026*; 9:00 p.m., FS1		vs. Mississippi State; Greenbrier Tip-Off	W 81–63	4–0	21 – Washington	8 – Washington	4 – Washington	Colonial Hall (1,020); White Sulphur Springs, WV
November 17, 2026*; 7:00 p.m., ESPN+		Cleveland State	W 75–67	5–0	19 – Nwoko	10 – Nwoko	6 – Borovićanin	Cintas Center (9,012); Cincinnati, OH
November 20, 2026*; 7:30 p.m., TNT		Iowa	L 65–83	5–1	21 – Nwoko	7 – Nwoko	5 – Tied	Cintas Center (10,212); Cincinnati, OH
November 25, 2026*; 2:30 p.m., ESPN2		vs. Texas A&M; Battle 4 Atlantis						Imperial Arena; Nassau, Bahamas
November 27, 2026*; 11:00 a.m., ESPN2		vs. Virginia; Battle 4 Atlantis						Imperial Arena; Nassau, Bahamas
December 2, 2026*; 7:00 p.m., ESPN+		Texas Southern						Cintas Center; Cincinnati, OH
December 5, 2026*; 8:00 p.m., ESPN2		at Cincinnati; Rivalry/Crosstown Shootout						Fifth Third Arena; Cincinnati, OH
December 9, 2026*; 7:00 p.m., ESPN+		Purdue Fort Wayne						Cintas Center; Cincinnati, OH
December 12, 2026*; 6:00 p.m., truTV		FIU						Cintas Center; Cincinnati, OH
Big East regular season
December 19, 2026; 6:30 p.m., Peacock/NBCSN		at Marquette						Fiserv Forum; Milwaukee, WI
December 22, 2026; 8:30 p.m., FS1		Creighton						Cintas Center; Cincinnati, OH
December 30, 2026; 8:00 p.m., FS1		at Georgetown						Capital One Arena; Washington, D.C.
January 2, 2027; 12:00 p.m., FS1		Seton Hall						Cintas Center; Cincinnati, OH
January 6, 2027; 7:00 p.m., truTV		Villanova						Cintas Center; Cincinnati, OH
January 9, 2027; 1:00 p.m., Peacock/NBCSN		at Providence						Amica Mutual Pavilion; Providence, RI
January 12, 2027; 8:00 p.m., FS1		Butler						Cintas Center; Cincinnati, OH
January 16, 2027; 12:00 p.m., FOX/FS1		at UConn						Gampel Pavilion; Storrs, CT
January 19, 2027; 6:30 p.m., FS1		at Villanova						Finneran Pavilion; Villanova, PA
January 23, 2027; 2:00 p.m., TNT		Marquette						Cintas Center; Cincinnati, OH
January 26, 2027; 8:00 p.m., Peacock/NBCSN		St. John's						Cintas Center; Cincinnati, OH
January 30, 2027; 2:00 p.m., FS1		at DePaul						Wintrust Arena; Chicago, IL
February 6, 2027; 3:30 p.m., TNT		at Butler						Hinkle Fieldhouse; Indianapolis, IN
February 9, 2027; 7:00 p.m., TNT		Georgetown						Cintas Center; Cincinnati, OH
February 13, 2027; 1:00 p.m., NBC		at St. John's						Madison Square Garden; New York, NY
February 20, 2027; 3:00 p.m., TNT		DePaul						Cintas Center; Cincinnati, OH
February 24, 2027; 8:30 p.m., Peacock/NBCSN		at Creighton						CHI Health Center Omaha; Omaha, NE
February 28, 2027; 12:00 p.m., FS1		at Seton Hall						Prudential Center; Newark, NJ
March 3, 2027; 7:00 p.m., FS1		Providence						Cintas Center; Cincinnati, OH
March 6, 2027; 2:30 p.m., TNT		UConn						Cintas Center; Cincinnati, OH
Big East tournament
March 10–13, 2027; Peacock/FS1/FOX		vs. TBD						Madison Square Garden; New York, NY
*Non-conference game. ^{#}Rankings from AP poll. (#) Tournament seedings in parentheses. All times are in Eastern Time.
