= 2026–27 DePaul Blue Demons men's basketball team =

American college basketball season

2026–27 DePaul Blue Demons men's basketball
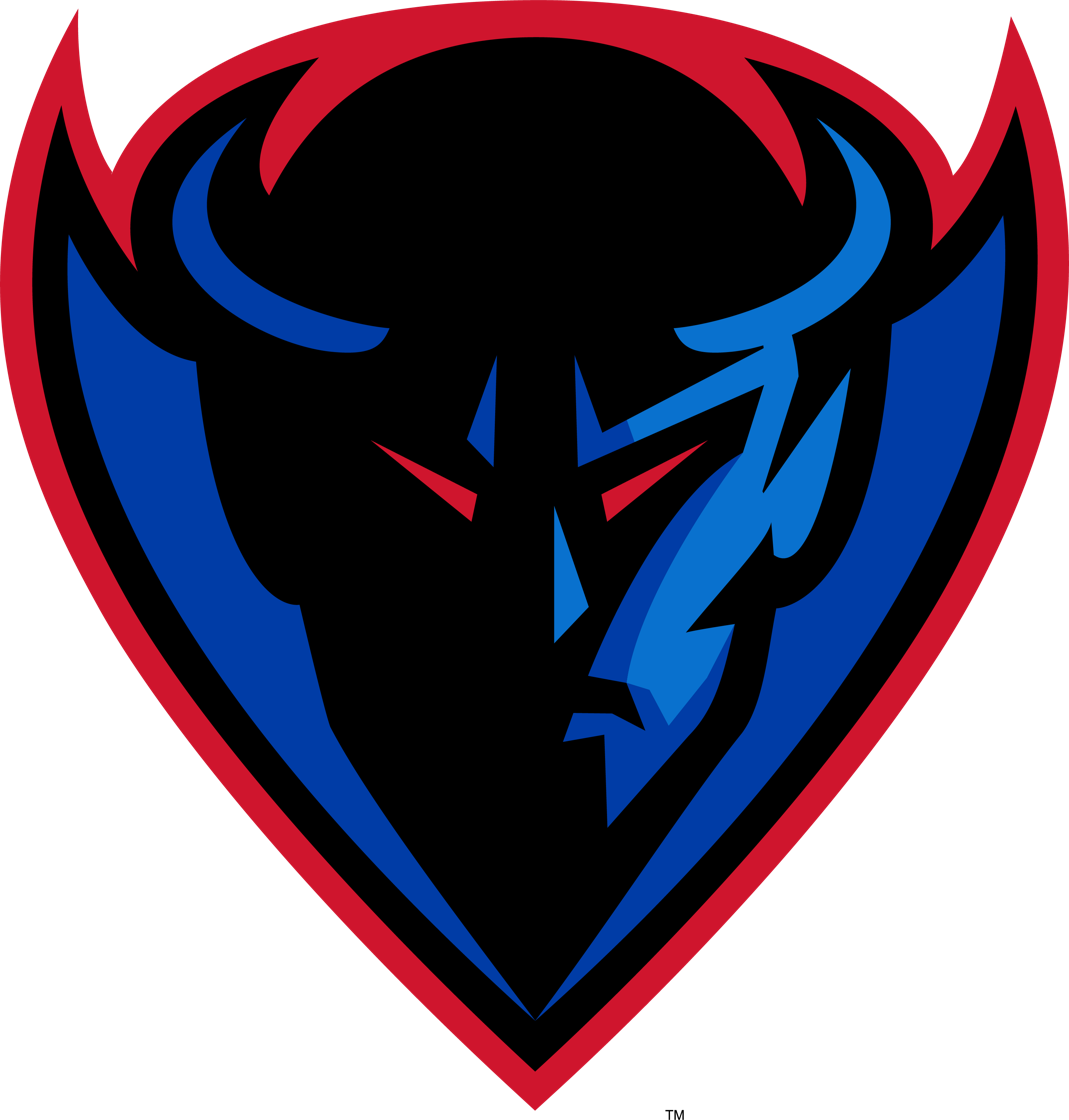
- Conference: Big East Conference
- Record: 4–0 (0–0 Big East)
- Head coach: Chris Holtmann (3rd season)
- Assistant coaches: Jack Owens (3rd season); Bryan Mullins (3rd season); Paris Parham (6th season); LaVall Jordan (3rd season); Brandon Bailey (3rd season)
- Home arena: Wintrust Arena

2026–27 Big East men's basketball standings
	Conf.				Overall
Team	W		L	PCT	W		L	PCT
DePaul	0	–	0	–	5	–	0	1.000
Georgetown	0	–	0	–	5	–	0	1.000
No. 13 St. John's	0	–	0	–	5	–	0	1.000
Seton Hall	0	–	0	–	5	–	1	.833
Xavier	0	–	0	–	5	–	1	.833
Creighton	0	–	0	–	4	–	1	.800
Providence	0	–	0	–	4	–	1	.800
No. 3 UConn	0	–	0	–	4	–	1	.800
Butler	0	–	0	–	4	–	2	.667
Marquette	0	–	0	–	3	–	2	.600
Villanova	0	–	0	–	3	–	2	.600
† 2027 Big East tournament winner As of November 21, 2026; Rankings from AP poll

The 2026–27 DePaul Blue Demons men's basketball team represents DePaul University during the 2026–27 NCAA Division I men's basketball season. They are led by third-year head coach Chris Holtmann and play their home games at Wintrust Arena in Chicago, Illinois as members of the Big East Conference.

== Previous season ==
The Blue Demons finished the 2025–26 season 16–16, 8–12 in Big East play to finish in 6th place. They lost to Georgetown in the first round of the Big East tournament.

== Offseason ==
=== Departures ===
DePaul Departures
Name	Number	Pos.	Height	Weight	Year	Hometown	Reason for departure
Brandon Maclin	0	G	6'3"	215	Senior	Jackson, TN	Graduated
Kaleb Banks	1	F	6'7"	215	Senior	Hampton, GA	Graduated
RJ Smith	5	G	6'3"	195	(redshirt) Junior	Chino, CA	Transferred to UC Santa Barbara
Isaiah Medina	7	C	7'0"	230	Freshman	Saint Petersburg, FL	Transferred to Missouri State
Ilija Milijasevic	10	G	6'3"	190	Junior	Belgrade, Serbia	Transferred to Wright State
CJ Gunn	11	G	6'7"	200	Senior	Indianapolis, IN	Graduated
Khaman Maker	14	C	7'1"	225	So	Las Vegas, NV	Transferred to Marshall
Jeremy Lorenz	32	F	6'8"	230	Junior	Brillion, WI	Transferred to St. Thomas
N.J. Benson	35	F	6'8"	235	Senior	Mount Vernon, IL	Transferred to Georgetown

=== Incoming transfers ===
DePaul Transfers
Name	Number	Pos.	Height	Weight	Year	Hometown	Previous School
Wilson Jacques	16	C	7'0"	264	Senior	Mertz, France	Fresno State
Ade Popoola	0	G	6'5"	200	Senior	St. Louis, MO	Tulsa
Koree Cotton	4	G	6'6"	210	Senior	Miami, FL	UT Rio Grande Valley
Noah Meeusen	9	G	6'5"	198	Junior	Zandvliet, Belgium	Arizona State
Magoon Gwath	1	F	7'0"	212	(redshirt) Junior	Euless, TX	San Diego State
Kahmare Holmes	11	G	6'3"	205	Junior	Charlotte, NC	Wofford

=== Recruiting classes ===
==== 2026 recruiting class ====
College recruiting (2026)
Name	Hometown	School	Height	Weight	Commit date
Noah Smith; PF	Westfield, IN	Westfield	6 ft 1 in (1.85 m)	200 lb (91 kg)	Aug 4, 2025
Noah Smith; PF	Recruit ratings: Rivals: 247Sports: ESPN: (82)				
Mason Lockett; SG	Oswego, IL	Oswego East	6 ft 4 in (1.93 m)	185 lb (84 kg)	Aug 5, 2024
Mason Lockett; SG	Recruit ratings: Rivals: 247Sports: ESPN: (NR)				
Andrew Jensen; PF	Kaukauna, WI	Kaukauna	6 ft 9 in (2.06 m)	205 lb (93 kg)	Jul 22, 2025
Andrew Jensen; PF	Recruit ratings: Rivals: 247Sports: ESPN: (NR)				
Overall recruit ranking:
Note: In many cases, Scout, Rivals, 247Sports, On3, and ESPN may conflict in their listings of height and weight.; In these cases, the average was taken. ESPN grades are on a 100-point scale.; Sources: "2026 DePaul Signees". Rivals.; "2026 DePaul Signees". ESPN.; "2026 Team Ranking". Rivals.

== Roster ==
2026–27 DePaul Blue Demons men's basketball team
Players
Coaches

Pos.	#	Name	Height	Weight	Year	Previous school	Hometown
G	0	Ade Popoola	6 ft 5 in (1.96 m)	204 lb (93 kg)	Sr	Moberly Area CC; Tulsa	St. Louis, MO
F	1	Magoon Gwath	7 ft 0 in (2.13 m)	210 lb (95 kg)	RS Jr	Veritas Prep; San Diego State	Euless, TX
G	2	Layden Blocker	6 ft 2 in (1.88 m)	190 lb (86 kg)	Sr	Sunrise Christian Academy (KS); Arkansas	Little Rock, AR
G	3	Nate Kasher (W)	6 ft 1 in (1.85 m)	183 lb (83 kg)	RS So	Glenbrook HS	Glenview, IL
G	4	Koree Cotton	6 ft 6 in (1.98 m)	225 lb (102 kg)	Sr	Jacksonville State; UT Rio Grande Valley	Miami, FL
G	5	Noah Smith	6 ft 8 in (2.03 m)	210 lb (95 kg)	Fr	Plainfield HS	Plainfield, IN
G	6	Jonas Johnson (W)	6 ft 7 in (2.01 m)	205 lb (93 kg)	So	DePaul Prep	Chicago, IL
F	8	Andrew Jensen	6 ft 10 in (2.08 m)	221 lb (100 kg)	Fr	Kaukauna HS	Kaukauna, WI
G	9	Noah Meeusen	6 ft 5 in (1.96 m)	198 lb (90 kg)	Jr	Filou Oostende; Arizona State	Zandvliet, Belgium
G	11	Kahmare Holmes	6 ft 3 in (1.91 m)	210 lb (95 kg)	Jr	Archer HS; Wofford	Charlotte, NC
C	15	Fabián Flores	7 ft 2 in (2.18 m)	265 lb (120 kg)	Jr	UCAM Murcia	Murcia, Spain
C	16	Wilson Jacques	7 ft 0 in (2.13 m)	273 lb (124 kg)	Sr	JL Bourg en Bresse; Fresno State	Mertz, France
F	21	Théo Pierre-Justin	6 ft 10 in (2.08 m)	230 lb (104 kg)	Jr	Chorale Roanne Basket	Coudures, France
G	22	Kruz McClure	6 ft 6 in (1.98 m)	190 lb (86 kg)	So	DME Academy	Westerville, OH
G	23	Mason Lockett IV	6 ft 5 in (1.96 m)	191 lb (87 kg)	Fr	Oswego East HS	Plainfield, IL
G	52	Amsal Delalić	6 ft 8 in (2.03 m)	220 lb (100 kg)	Jr	Borac Nektar; Pittsburgh	Tuzla, Bosnia and Herzegovina

Head coach

- Chris Holtmann (Taylor)

Assistant coach(es)

- Jack Owens (Eastern Illinois)
- Bryan Mullins (Southern Illinois)
- Paris Parham (Minnesota State)
- LaVall Jordan (Butler)
- Brandon Bailey (DePaul)

Legend

- (C) Team captain
- (S) Suspended
- (I) Ineligible
- (W) Walk-on
- Injured
- Current redshirt

Roster
Last update: July 29, 2026

== Schedule and results ==
Date time, TV	Rank^{#}	Opponent^{#}	Result	Record	High points	High rebounds	High assists	Site (attendance) city, state
Exhibition
October 18, 2026*; 1:00 p.m.		at Loyola–Chicago	W 72–65	–	25 – Popoola	6 – Gwath	3 – Meeusen	Joseph J. Gentile Arena (2,645); Chicago, IL
October 23, 2026*; 7:00 p.m.		Notre Dame	L 63–71	–	19 – Koehler	5 – Smith	5 – Koehler	Wintrust Arena (3,828); Chicago, IL
Regular season
November 2, 2026*; 7:00 p.m., ESPN+		West Georgia	W 75–58	1–0	20 – Cotton	7 – Tied	8 – Meeusen	Wintrust Arena (2,487); Chicago, IL
November 5, 2026*; 7:30 p.m., truTV		South Florida	W 82–80	2–0	18 – McClure	6 – Flores	7 – Meeusen	Wintrust Arena (3,025); Chicago, IL
November 9, 2026*; 8:00 p.m., truTV		Alabama A&M	W 84–47	3–0	20 – Blocker	7 – Mcclure	6 – Mcclure	Wintrust Arena (3,316); Chicago, IL
November 13, 2026*; 7:00/8:00 p.m., BTN		at Northwestern	W 67–47	4–0	18 – Mcclure	8 – Flores	6 – Meeusen	Welsh–Ryan Arena (4,556); Evanston, IL
November 17, 2026*; 7:00 p.m., ESPN+		Maryland Eastern Shore	W 83–39	5–0	19 – Blocker	6 – Gwath	6 – Holmes	Wintrust Arena (2,725); Chicago, IL
November 24, 2026*; 5:00 p.m.		vs. Purdue; Fort Myers Tip-Off – Beach Division						Suncoast Credit Union Arena; Fort Myers, FL
November 26, 2026*; 6:00 p.m.		vs. Pittsburgh; Fort Myers Tip-Off – Beach Division						Suncoast Credit Union Arena; Fort Myers, FL
December 1, 2026*; 7:00 p.m.		North Alabama						Wintrust Arena; Chicago, IL
December 5, 2026*; 4:30 p.m., TNT		SMU						Wintrust Arena; Chicago, IL
December 8, 2026*; 8:00 p.m., truTV		Maine						Wintrust Arena; Chicago, IL
December 12, 2026*; ESPN+		at Saint Louis						Chaifetz Arena; St. Louis, MO
December 19, 2026; 7:30 p.m., Peacock		at St. John's						Madison Square Garden; New York, NY
December 22, 2026*; 7:00 p.m., ESPN+		Canisius						Wintrust Arena; Chicago, IL
December 30, 2026; 3:00 p.m., truTV		Seton Hall						Wintrust Arena; Chicago, IL
January 2, 2027; 1:00 p.m., FS1		Providence						Wintrust Arena; Chicago, IL
January 6, 2027; 1:00 p.m., FS1		at UConn						Harry A. Gampel Pavilion; Storrs, CT
January 9, 2027; 3:00 p.m., FS1		Butler						Wintrust Arena; Chicago, IL
January 13, 2027; 8:00 p.m., FS1		at Creighton						CHI Health Center Omaha; Omaha, NE
January 16, 2027; 12:30 p.m., TNT		at Marquette						Fiserv Forum; Milwaukee, WI
January 19, 2027; 6:30 p.m., truTV		St. John's						Wintrust Arena; Chicago, IL
January 22, 2027; 6:00 p.m., FS1		Villanova						Wintrust Arena; Chicago, IL
January 30, 2027; 1:00 p.m., FS1		Xavier						Wintrust Arena; Chicago, IL
February 3, 2027; 7:30 p.m., FS1		at Georgetown						Capital One Arena; Washington D.C.
February 7, 2027; 1:30 p.m., FS1		at Seton Hall						Prudential Center; Newark, NJ
February 10, 2027; 7:30 p.m., FS1		UConn						Wintrust Arena; Chicago, IL
February 13, 2027; 11:00 a.m., truTV		at Providence						Amica Mutual Pavilion; Providence, RI
February 16, 2027; 8:00 p.m., TNT		Georgetown						Wintrust Arena; Chicago, IL
February 20, 2027; 2:00 p.m., TNT		at Xavier						Cintas Center; Cincinnati, OH
February 23, 2027; 7:00 p.m., FS1		at Butler						Hinkle Fieldhouse; Indianapolis, IN
February 27, 2027; 6:00 p.m., Peacock		Creighton						Wintrust Arena; Chicago, IL
March 3, 2027; 6:00 p.m., Peacock		at Villanova						Finneran Pavilion; Villanova, PA
March 6, 2027; 6:00 p.m., Peacock		Marquette						Wintrust Arena; Chicago, IL
Big East tournament
March 2026								Madison Square Garden; New York, NY
*Non-conference game. ^{#}Rankings from AP Poll. (#) Tournament seedings in parentheses. All times are in Central Time.
