= 2026–27 Georgetown Hoyas men's basketball team =

American college basketball season

2026–27 Georgetown Hoyas men's basketball
- Conference: Big East
- Record: 6–0 (0–0 Big East)
- Head coach: Ed Cooley (4th season)
- Associate head coach: Jeff Battle (4th season)
- Assistant coaches: Brian Blaney (4th season); Walt Corbean (4th season); LaDontae Henton (4th season); Jason Williford (2nd season)
- Captain: Kayvaun Mulready
- Home arena: Capital One Arena; McDonough Gymnasium

2026–27 Big East men's basketball standings
	Conf.				Overall
Team	W		L	PCT	W		L	PCT
Georgetown	0	–	0	–	6	–	0	1.000
DePaul	0	–	0	–	5	–	0	1.000
No. 13 St. John's	0	–	0	–	5	–	0	1.000
Seton Hall	0	–	0	–	5	–	1	.833
Xavier	0	–	0	–	5	–	1	.833
Creighton	0	–	0	–	4	–	1	.800
Providence	0	–	0	–	4	–	1	.800
No. 3 UConn	0	–	0	–	4	–	1	.800
Butler	0	–	0	–	4	–	2	.667
Marquette	0	–	0	–	3	–	2	.600
Villanova	0	–	0	–	3	–	2	.600
† 2027 Big East tournament winner As of November 22, 2026; Rankings from AP poll

The 2026–27 Georgetown Hoyas men's basketball team represents Georgetown University in the 2026–27 NCAA Division I men's basketball season. The Hoyas, led by fourth-year head coach Ed Cooley, are members of the Big East Conference. The Hoyas play their home games in Washington, D.C., at Capital One Arena and McDonough Gymnasium.

== Previous season ==
Although the team's performance had been markedly better in the 2024–25 season than in the previous several seasons, the Hoyas had a disappointing season in 2025–26 — Ed Cooley's third as head coach — finishing with a record of 16–18 and going 6–14 in Big East play to end the year tied for tenth place in the conference. With an eleventh seed in the Big East Tournament, however, they advanced beyond the first round for the first time since their tournament championship in 2021, upsetting seventh-seeded DePaul in the first round and third-seeded Villanova in the quarterfinals before falling to second-seeded UConn — ranked sixth nationally — in a semifinal game, bringing their season to an end.

== Offseason ==
=== Departures ===
Departures
Name	No.	Pos.	Height	Weight	Year	Hometown	Reason for departure
Jayden Fort	0	F	6'9"	216	Sophomore	Washington, DC	Transferred to Charlotte
DeShawn Harris-Smith	1	G	6'5"	224	Junior	Woodbridge, VA	Left team in December 2025; transferred to Delaware
Malik Mack	2	G	6'2"	175	RS Freshman	Oxon Hill, MD	Transferred to Providence
KJ Lewis	5	G	6'4"	210	Junior	El Paso, TX	Transferred to USC
Isaiah Abraham	7	F	6'7"	205	Sophomore	Gainesville, VA	Transferred to Kansas State
Julius Halaifonua	11	C	7'0"	259	Sophomore	Auckland, NZ	Transferred to Oklahoma State
Austin Montgomery	12	F	6'6"	205	Junior	New Orleans, LA	Transferred to Hampton
Langston Love	13	G	6'5"	210	Graduate student	Universal City, TX	Completed eligibility
Hashem Asadallah	15	G	6'2"	189	Junior	Jabriya, Kuwait	Transferred to Salisbury
Jeremiah Williams	25	G	6'4"	200	Senior	Chicago, IL	Completed eligibility

=== Incoming transfers ===
Incoming Transfers
Name	No.	Pos.	Height	Weight	Year	Hometown	Previous school
Vyctorius Miller	5	G	6'5"	190	Junior	Los Angeles, CA	Oklahoma State
Josiah Parker	7	F	6'7"	225	Sophomore	Huber Heights, OH	Florida Atlantic
Elmarko Jackson	9	G	6'3"	195	RS Junior	Marlton, NJ	Kansas
Chol Machot	11	C	7'0"	190	Junior	Melbourne, Australia	Charleston
NJ Benson	12	F	6'8"	235	Graduate Student	Mount Vernon, IL	DePaul
Jaland Lowe	15	G	6'1"	170	Junior	Missouri City, TX	Kentucky

=== Recruiting class ===
College recruiting
Name	Hometown	School	Height	Weight	Commit date
Justin Caldwell; PF	Fayetteville, NC	Fayetteville Academy	6 ft 9 in (2.06 m)	235 lb (107 kg)	Nov 18, 2025
Justin Caldwell; PF	Recruit ratings: Rivals: 247Sports: ESPN: (81)				
Athan Olivier IV; PG	Lafayette, LA	The Dunham School	6 ft 0 in (1.83 m)	170 lb (77 kg)	May 19, 2026
Athan Olivier IV; PG	Recruit ratings: No ratings found				
Pedro Pastre; SF	Curitiba, Brazil	Esporte Clube Pinheiros	6 ft 6 in (1.98 m)	185 lb (84 kg)	Jun 8, 2026
Pedro Pastre; SF	Recruit ratings: No ratings found				
Overall recruit ranking:
Note: In many cases, Scout, Rivals, 247Sports, On3, and ESPN may conflict in their listings of height and weight.; In these cases, the average was taken. ESPN grades are on a 100-point scale.; Sources: "2026 Georgetown Hoyas Basketball Commits". Rivals.; "2026 Georgetown Signees". ESPN.; "2026 Team Ranking". Rivals.

In addition to the incoming freshmen Caldwell, Olivier, and Pastre, point guard Gabriel Landeira committed to Georgetown in November 2025 and joined the team in January 2026, but redshirted during the 2025–26 season. He was a part of the 2025 recruiting class, but is seeing his first collegiate playing time during the 2026-27 season.

Georgetown's 2026 recruiting class initially included forward Alex Constanza, who signed with the team in November 2025 but de-committed in April 2026. In June 2026 he committed to Pepperdine.

== Roster ==
2026–27 Georgetown Hoyas men's basketball team
Players
Coaches

Pos.	#	Name	Height	Weight	Year	Previous school	Hometown
G	1	Athan Olivier IV	5 ft 10 in (1.78 m)	170 lb (77 kg)	Fr	The Dunham School (LA)	Lafayette, LA
F	2	Justin Caldwell	6 ft 9 in (2.06 m)	241 lb (109 kg)	Fr	Fayetteville Academy (NC)	Fayetteville, NC
C	3	Vince Iwuchukwu	7 ft 1 in (2.16 m)	262 lb (119 kg)	RS Sr	St. John's	Imo State, Nigeria
F	4	Caleb Williams	6 ft 7 in (2.01 m)	228 lb (103 kg)	Jr	Sidwell Friends School (DC)	Upper Marlboro, MD
G	5	Vyctorius Miller	6 ft 5 in (1.96 m)	190 lb (86 kg)	Jr	Oklahoma State	Los Angeles, CA
F	7	Josiah Parker	6 ft 7 in (2.01 m)	234 lb (106 kg)	So	Florida Atlantic	Huber Heights, OH
G	8	Mason Moses (W)	6 ft 6 in (1.98 m)	215 lb (98 kg)	Jr	Brewster Academy (NH)	New York, NY
G	9	Elmarko Jackson	6 ft 3 in (1.91 m)	195 lb (88 kg)	Sr	Kansas	Marlton, NJ
C	11	Chol Machot	7 ft 0 in (2.13 m)	199 lb (90 kg)	RS Jr	Charleston	Melbourne, Australia
F	12	NJ Benson (I)	6 ft 8 in (2.03 m)	235 lb (107 kg)	GS	DePaul	Mount Vernon, IL
C	14	Seal Diouf	6 ft 9 in (2.06 m)	244 lb (111 kg)	Jr	The Dunn School (CA)	Gouda, Netherlands
G	15	Jaland Lowe	6 ft 2 in (1.88 m)	175 lb (79 kg)	Sr	Kentucky	Missouri City, TX
G	22	Gabriel Landeira	6 ft 6 in (1.98 m)	202 lb (92 kg)	RS Fr	Instituto de Formacao Profissional e Emprego	Rio de Janeiro, Brazil
F	25	Pedro Pastre	6 ft 6 in (1.98 m)	218 lb (99 kg)	Fr	Colégio Ábaco Sumaré	Curitiba, Brazil
G	30	Michael Van Raaphorst (W)	6 ft 3 in (1.91 m)	210 lb (95 kg)	Jr	Delbarton School (NJ)	Chatham, NJ
G	45	Kayvaun Mulready (C)	6 ft 4 in (1.93 m)	220 lb (100 kg)	Jr	Worcester Academy (MA)	Worcester, MA

Head coach

- Ed Cooley (Stonehill)

Assistant coach(es)

- Jeff Battle (Marshall)
- Brian Blaney (Roanoke)
- Walt Corbean (Xavier)
- LaDontae Henton (Providence)
- Jason Williford (Virginia)

Legend

- (C) Team captain
- (S) Suspended
- (I) Ineligible
- (W) Walk-on
- Injured
- Current redshirt

Roster

== Season recap ==
=== Exhibition ===
Georgetown scheduled two exhibition games, both on the road. The Hoyas won both, defeating Wake Forest on October 4 and George Washington on October 16.

=== Non-conference season ===
The Hoyas are playing a 12-game non-conference schedule between November 2 and December 16, 2026. They met Maryland in the second game of a four-year home-and-home series against the Terrapins and won 86–74. They visited Clemson, defeating the Tigers 85–78 in the second year of a two-year home-and-home series that the Hoyas swept. In late November, they will participate along with Saint Mary's, Texas, and UCLA in the Rady Children's Invitational in San Diego, California. They will host North Carolina in the second game of a two-year home-and-home series against the Tar Heels. For the second straight season, they will not play their former Big East rival Syracuse.

=== Conference season ===
The Hoyas will play a 20-game Big East Conference schedule from December 19, 2026, through March 6, 2027, meeting each conference opponent twice in a home-and-home series.

== Schedule and results ==
Date time, TV	Rank^{#}	Opponent^{#}	Result	Record	High points	High rebounds	High assists	Site (attendance) city, state
Exhibition
October 4, 2026*; 12:30 p.m., ESPN+		at Wake Forest	W 94–77	—	18 – Miller	8 – Machot	10 – Lowe	Lawrence Joel Veterans; Memorial Coliseum (N/A); Winston-Salem, NC
October 16, 2026*; 6:00 p.m., Monumental		at George Washington	W 76–68	—	19 – Lowe	10 – Parker	4 – Landeira	Charles E. Smith Center (4,312); Washington, DC
Non-conference regular season
November 2, 2026*; 6:30 p.m., ESPN+		Loyola Maryland	W 80–58	1–0	23 – Lowe	9 – Iwuchukwu	4 – Tied	Capital One Arena (3,034); Washington, DC
November 7, 2026*; 7:30 p.m., Peacock		Maryland	W 86–74	2–0	22 – Lowe	5 – Tied	8 – Lowe	Capital One Area (14,739); Washington, DC
November 10, 2026*; 6:30 p.m., ESPN+		Delaware State	W 83–78	3–0	28 – Iwuchukwu	13 – Iwuchukwu	15 – Lowe	McDonough Gymnasium (1,154); Washington, DC
November 13, 2026*; 6:00 p.m., ESPNU		at Clemson	W 85–78	4–0	21 – Lowe	10 – Iwuchukwu	6 – Lowe	Littlejohn Coliseum (7,434); Clemson, SC
November 18, 2026*; 6:30 p.m., ESPN+		Navy	W 84–53	5–0	17 – Mulready	10 – Jackson	8 – Lowe	Capital One Arena (4,476); Washington, DC
November 21, 2026*; 6:00 p.m., ESPN+		Coppin State	W 84–60	6–0	29 – Iwuchukwu	10 – Iwuchukwu	5 – Lowe	McDonough Gymnasium (1,660); Washington, DC
November 26, 2026*; 2:30 p.m., FS1		vs. Texas; Rady Children's Invitational Semifinal						Jenny Craig Pavilion (TBA); San Diego, CA
November 27, 2026*; 2:30 or 5:00 p.m., FOX		vs. UCLA/Saint Mary's; Rady Children's Invitational Third Place/Final						Jenny Craig Pavilion (TBA); San Diego, CA
December 2, 2026*; 6:30 p.m., ESPN+		UMass Lowell						Capital One Arena (TBA); Washington, DC
December 9, 2026*; 6:30 p.m., ESPN+		Rider						Capital One Arena (TBA); Washington, DC
December 12, 2026*; 12:00 p.m., NBCSN/Peacock		North Carolina						Capital One Arena (TBA); Washington, DC
December 16, 2026*; 6:30 p.m., ESPN+		Sacred Heart						Capital One Arena (TBA); Washington, DC
Big East regular season
December 19, 2026; 12:00 p.m., TruTV		Seton Hall						Capital One Arena (TBA); Washington, DC
December 23, 2026; 3:00 p.m., NBCSN/Peacock		at UConn; Rivalry						PeoplesBank Arena (TBA); Hartford, CT
December 30, 2026; 8:00 p.m., FS1		Xavier						Capital One Arena (TBA); Washington, DC
January 3, 2027; 12:00 p.m., Peacock		Villanova						Capital One Arena (TBA); Washington, DC
January 6, 2027; 7:00 p.m., NBCSN/Peacock		at St. John's; Rivalry						Madison Square Garden (TBA); New York, NY
January 9, 2027; 12:00 p.m., TNT		Creighton						Capital One Arena (TBA); Washington, DC
January 15, 2027; 8:00 p.m., FS1		at Seton Hall						Prudential Center (TBA); Newark, NJ
January 18, 2027; 6:30 p.m., FS1		at Butler						Hinkle Fieldhouse (TBA); Indianapolis, IN
January 23, 2027; 6:00 p.m., FS1		Providence						Capital One Arena (TBA); Washington, DC
January 26, 2027; 8:00 p.m., FS1		UConn; Rivalry						Capital One Arena (TBA); Washington, DC
January 30, 2027; 3:30 p.m., TNT		at Creighton						CHI Health Center Omaha (TBA); Omaha, NE
February 3, 2027; 8:30 p.m., FS1		DePaul						Capital One Arena (TBA); Washington, DC
February 6, 2027; 1:30 p.m., TNT		at Marquette						Fiserv Forum (TBA); Milwaukee, WI
February 9, 2027; 7:00 p.m., TNT		at Xavier						Cintas Center (TBA); Cincinnati, OH
February 13, 2027; 12:00 p.m., NBCSN/Peacock		Butler						Capital One Arena (TBA); Washington, DC
February 16, 2027; 9:00 p.m., TNT		at DePaul						Wintrust Arena (TBA); Chicago, IL
February 20, 2027; 1:00 p.m., TNT		St. John's; Rivalry						Capital One Arena (TBA); Washington, DC
February 23, 2027; 8:00 p.m., Peacock		at Providence						Amica Mutual Pavilion (TBA); Providence, RI
March 2, 2027; 6:30 p.m., FS1		Marquette						Capital One Arena (TBA); Washington, DC
March 6, 2027; 12:30 p.m., TNT		at Villanova						Finneran Pavilion (TBA); Villanova, PA
Big East Tournament
March 10–13, 2027; TBA, TBA	(TBA)	vs. TBA						Madison Square Garden (TBA); New York, NY
*Non-conference game. ^{#}Rankings from AP Poll. (#) Tournament seedings in parentheses. All times are in Eastern Time.

== Awards and honors ==
=== Weekly honors ===
Big East Player of the Week
Player	Position	Award Date
Jaland Lowe	G	November 9, 2026
Vince Iwuchukwu	C	November 16, 2026
