= 2026–27 Creighton Bluejays men's basketball team =

American college basketball season

2026–27 Creighton Bluejays men's basketball
- Conference: Big East Conference
- Record: 4–1 (0–0 Big East)
- Head coach: Alan Huss (1st season)
- Assistant coaches: Derek Kellogg (4th season); Trey Zeigler (3rd season); Mike Nesbitt (2nd season); Mitch Ballock (2nd season); Corey Edwards (1st season)
- Home arena: CHI Health Center Omaha

2026–27 Big East men's basketball standings
	Conf.				Overall
Team	W		L	PCT	W		L	PCT
DePaul	0	–	0	–	5	–	0	1.000
Georgetown	0	–	0	–	5	–	0	1.000
No. 13 St. John's	0	–	0	–	5	–	0	1.000
Seton Hall	0	–	0	–	5	–	1	.833
Xavier	0	–	0	–	5	–	1	.833
Creighton	0	–	0	–	4	–	1	.800
Providence	0	–	0	–	4	–	1	.800
No. 3 UConn	0	–	0	–	4	–	1	.800
Butler	0	–	0	–	4	–	2	.667
Marquette	0	–	0	–	3	–	2	.600
Villanova	0	–	0	–	3	–	2	.600
† 2027 Big East tournament winner As of November 21, 2026; Rankings from AP poll

The 2026–27 Creighton Bluejays men's basketball team represents Creighton University in the 2025–26 NCAA Division I men's basketball season. The Bluejays, led by 1st-year head coach Alan Huss, play their home games at the CHI Health Center Omaha in Omaha, Nebraska as members of the Big East Conference.

== Previous season ==
They finished the regular season 15–17, 9–11 in Big East play to finish in fifth place. They lost to Seton Hall in the quarterfinals of the Big East tournament. They accepted a bid to the College Basketball Crown tournament, where they defeated Rutgers in the quarterfinals before falling to West Virginia in the semifinals.

== Roster ==
2025–26 Creighton Bluejays men's basketball team
Players
Coaches

Pos.	#	Name	Height	Weight	Year	Previous school	Hometown
F	0	Jasen Green	6 ft 8 in (2.03 m)	235 lb (107 kg)	RS Sr	Millard North	Omaha, NE
G	1	Austin Swartz	6 ft 4 in (1.93 m)	205 lb (93 kg)	Jr	Cannon School; Miami (FL)	Concord, NC
G	2	Wes Enis	6 ft 1 in (1.85 m)	200 lb (91 kg)	Sr	Miami East; South Florida	Conover, OH
G	4	Brody Robinson	5 ft 11 in (1.8 m)	165 lb (75 kg)		Houston Christian; Oakland	Houston, TX
G	5	Katrelle Harmon	6 ft 4 in (1.93 m)	190 lb (86 kg)	Fr	Wasatch Academy	Seattle, WA
G	7	Kayden "Bugg" Edwards	6 ft 3 in (1.91 m)	170 lb (77 kg)	So	Duncanville; TCU	Fort Worth, TX
F	8	Trevon Carter-Givens	6 ft 10 in (2.08 m)	190 lb (86 kg)	Fr	SoCal Academy	Jacksonville, FL
G	10	Hudson Greer	6 ft 7 in (2.01 m)	215 lb (98 kg)	So	Montverde Academy (FL)	Austin, TX
G	12	Shane Thomas	6 ft 3 in (1.91 m)	195 lb (88 kg)	RS So	Red Rocks Academy	Las Vegas, NV
F	23	Jackson McAndrew	6 ft 10 in (2.08 m)	225 lb (102 kg)	Jr	Wayzata	Wayzata, MN
G	24	BJ Davis	6 ft 1 in (1.85 m)	175 lb (79 kg)	Sr	Modesto Christian; San Diego State	Modesto, CA
C	32	Wesly Rosa	7 ft 2 in (2.18 m)	270 lb (122 kg)	Sr	Bridgeport International; Dodge City CC	São Vicente, Cape Verde
C	34	Fredrick King	6 ft 9 in (2.06 m)	270 lb (122 kg)		NBA Academy Latin America; Murray State	Mangrove Cay, Bahamas
F	41	Isaac Traudt	6 ft 10 in (2.08 m)	235 lb (107 kg)	RS Sr	Grand Island Senior; Virginia	Grand Island, NE
F	55	Oswin Erhunmwunse	6 ft 10 in (2.08 m)	240 lb (109 kg)	Jr	Putnam Science Academy; Providence	Benin City, Nigeria

Head coach

- Alan Huss (Creighton)

Assistant coach(es)

- Derek Kellogg (UMass)
- Trey Zeigler (TCU)
- Mike Nesbitt (New Mexico)
- Mitch Ballock (Creighton)
- Corey Edwards (George Mason)

Legend

- (C) Team captain
- (S) Suspended
- (I) Ineligible
- (W) Walk-on
- Injured
- Current redshirt

Roster

== Schedule and results ==
Date time, TV	Rank^{#}	Opponent^{#}	Result	Record	High points	High rebounds	High assists	Site (attendance) city, state
Exhibition
October 18, 2026*; 12:00 p.m., ESPN+		Iowa State	W 83–80		16 – Harmon	6 – Greer	6 – Harmon	James H. Hilton Coliseum (13,601); Ames, IA
October 23, 2026*; 7:30 p.m., YouTube		Minnesota	W 89–86 ^{2OT}		20 – Enis	8 – Davis	6 – Harmon	CHI Health Center Omaha (16,008); Omaha, NE
Regular season
November 2, 2026*; 8:00 p.m., ESPN+		Kansas City	W 76–61	1–0	25 – Enis	7 – McAndrew	6 – Harmon	CHI Health Center Omaha (15,980); Omaha, NE
November 5, 2026*; 8:00 p.m., ESPN+		Le Moyne	W 83–55	2–0	19 – McAndrew	8 – Davis	5 – Tied	CHI Health Center Omaha (15,993); Omaha, NE
November 10, 2026*; 8:00 p.m., FS1		at Kansas State	L 82–89	2–1	25 – Davis	6 – Erhunmwunse	3 – Tied	Bramlage Coliseum (6,820); Manhattan, KS
November 15, 2026*; 2:00 p.m., FS1		vs. Iowa	W 80–79	3–1	18 – Swartz	7 – Green	6 – Harmon	Casey's Center (12,897); Des Moines, IA
*Non-conference game. ^{#}Rankings from AP Poll. (#) Tournament seedings in parentheses. All times are in Central Time.
