= 2026–27 Seton Hall Pirates men's basketball team =

American college basketball season

2026–27 Seton Hall Pirates men's basketball

Bahamas Championship champions
- Conference: Big East Conference
- Record: 5–1 (0–0 Big East)
- Head coach: Shaheen Holloway (5th season)
- Assistant coaches: Donald Copeland; Rasheen Davis; Ryan Whalen; Andrew Francis
- Home arena: Prudential Center; Walsh Gymnasium

2026–27 Big East men's basketball standings
	Conf.				Overall
Team	W		L	PCT	W		L	PCT
DePaul	0	–	0	–	5	–	0	1.000
Georgetown	0	–	0	–	5	–	0	1.000
No. 13 St. John's	0	–	0	–	5	–	0	1.000
Xavier	0	–	0	–	5	–	0	1.000
Creighton	0	–	0	–	4	–	1	.800
Providence	0	–	0	–	4	–	1	.800
Seton Hall	0	–	0	–	4	–	1	.800
No. 3 UConn	0	–	0	–	4	–	1	.800
Butler	0	–	0	–	4	–	2	.667
Marquette	0	–	0	–	3	–	2	.600
Villanova	0	–	0	–	3	–	2	.600
† 2027 Big East tournament winner As of November 21, 2026; Rankings from AP poll

The 2026–27 Seton Hall Pirates men's basketball team will represent Seton Hall University in the 2026–27 NCAA Division I men's basketball season. They are led by fifth-year head coach Shaheen Holloway. The Pirates play their home games at the Prudential Center in Newark, New Jersey, and Walsh Gymnasium in South Orange, New Jersey, as members of the Big East Conference.

== Previous season ==
The Pirates finished the 2025–26 season 21–12, 10–10 in Big East play to finish in fourth place. They beat Creighton in the first round of the Big East tournament, but were defeated by number one seeded St. John's in the second round. Following the team's loss in the Big East tournament, they announced that they would not participate in any postseason tournaments.

On July 11, 2026 Holloway agreed to a six-year contract extension with Seton Hall.

On August 20, 2026, assistant coach Corey Lowery was hired as the head coach of the Texas Southern. He was replaced by former Wagner head coach Donald Copeland. Copeland was previously an assistant coach for the Pirates during the 2021 season.

=== Departures ===
All players listed as "graduated" are tentative departures unless otherwise noted.

Seton Hall departures
Name	Number	Pos.	Height	Weight	Year	Hometown	Reason for departure
Budd Clark	0	G	5'10"	225	Junior	Philadelphia, Pennsylvania	Transferred to Ole Miss
Jacob Dar	1	G/F	6'7"	190	Senior	Omaha, Nebraska	Transferred to Rice
Tajuan Simpkins	2	G	6'4"	190	Junior	Brooklyn, New York	Transferred to Mississippi State
Stephon Payne	6	F	6'9"	235	Senior	Jacksonville, Florida	Transferred to New Mexico State
Josh Rivera	7	F	6'6"	225	Senior	New Brunswick, New Jersey	Transferred to Tennessee State
Patrick Suemnick	9	F	6'8"	235	Graduate	Green Bay, Wisconsin	Graduated
AJ Staton-McCray	14	G	6'4"	200	Senior	Delray Beach, Florida	Graduated
Jasheem Felton	15	G	6'5"	205	Sophomore	Charlotte, North Carolina	Transferred to Alcorn State
Mike Williams	23	G	6'3"	185	Junior	Baltimore, Maryland	Transferred to Tulsa
Najai Hines	25	F	6'10"	265	Freshman	Plainfield, New Jersey	Transferred to UConn
Assane Mbaye	35	C	7'2"	190	Sophomore	M'Bour, Senegal	Transferred to Florida A&M
David Gabriel	41	G	6'1"	175	Senior	North Bergen, New Jersey	Graduated
Godswill Erheriene	54	C	6'9"	225	Sophomore	Ughelli, Nigeria	Transferred to Incarnate Word

=== Incoming transfers ===
Seton Hall incoming transfers
Name	Number	Pos.	Height	Weight	Year	Hometown	Previous school
Del Jones	0	G	6'3"	187	Junior	Arlington County, Virginia	Radford
Kareem Thomas	2	F	6'5"	195	Junior	Wilmington, Delaware	Dartmouth
Simeon Wilcher	4	G	6'4"	200	Senior	Plainfield, New Jersey	Texas
Rodney Brown Jr.	6	G	6'6"	185	Senior	Perris, California	Loyola Marymount
Terry Copeland Jr.	9	F	6'9"	225	Junior	Orange, New Jersey	Howard College
Mayar Wol	15	F	6'8"	196	Senior	Raleigh, North Carolina	Bowling Green
Mihailo Petrović	17	G	6'3"	180	Sophomore	Prokuplje, Serbia	Illinois
Devin Williams	22	F	6'10"	205	Junior	Riverside, California	Florida Atlantic
Roddie Anderson III	23	G	6'3"	185	Graduate	Orange County, California	Xavier
Abdulai Fanta Kabba	77	C	7'0"	235	Junior	Kenema, Sierra Leone	Western Carolina

==== 2026 recruiting class ====
College recruiting
Name	Hometown	School	Height	Weight	Commit date
Darien Moore; SG	Wolfeboro, NH	Brewster Academy	6 ft 2 in (1.88 m)	170 lb (77 kg)	Feb 6, 2024
Darien Moore; SG	Recruit ratings: Rivals: 247Sports: ESPN: (82)				

==== 2027 Recruiting Class ====
College recruiting
Name	Hometown	School	Height	Weight	Commit date
Javion Tyndale; PG	Mississauga, Ont., Canada	Montverde Academy	5 ft 9 in (1.75 m)	160 lb (73 kg)	Sep 21, 2026
Javion Tyndale; PG	Recruit ratings: Rivals: 247Sports: ESPN: (85)				

== Roster ==
2026–27 Seton Hall Pirates men's basketball team
Players
Coaches

Pos.	#	Name	Height	Weight	Year	Previous school	Hometown
G	0	Del Jones	6 ft 3 in (1.91 m)	187 lb (85 kg)	Jr	Radford	Arlington County, Virginia
G	1	Trey Parker	6 ft 0 in (1.83 m)	180 lb (82 kg)	Jr	NC State	Fayetteville, North Carolina
G	2	Kareem Thomas	6 ft 5 in (1.96 m)	195 lb (88 kg)	Jr	Dartmouth	Wilmington, Delaware
G	4	Simeon Wilcher	6 ft 4 in (1.93 m)	200 lb (91 kg)	Sr	Texas	Plainfield, New Jersey
G	6	Rodney Brown Jr.	6 ft 6 in (1.98 m)	195 lb (88 kg)	Sr	Loyola Marymount	Perris, California
G	7	Darien Moore Jr.	6 ft 2 in (1.88 m)	190 lb (86 kg)	Fr	Brewster Academy	Troy, New York
F	9	Terry Copeland Jr.	6 ft 9 in (2.06 m)	270 lb (122 kg)	Jr	Howard College	Orange, New Jersey
F	14	Theo Airhienbuwa	6 ft 8 in (2.03 m)	220 lb (100 kg)	Fr	Aquila Basket Trento	Verona, Italy
F	15	Mayar Wol	6 ft 8 in (2.03 m)	196 lb (89 kg)	Sr	Bowling Green	Raleigh, North Carolina
G	17	Mihailo Petrović	6 ft 0 in (1.83 m)	180 lb (82 kg)	Jr	Illinois	Prokuplje, Serbia
G	21	Elijah Fisher	6 ft 6 in (1.98 m)	220 lb (100 kg)	GS	Pacific	Toronto, Ontario, Canada
F	22	Devin Williams	6 ft 10 in (2.08 m)	205 lb (93 kg)	Jr	Florida Atlantic	Riverside, California
G	23	Roddie Anderson III	6 ft 3 in (1.91 m)	195 lb (88 kg)	GS	Xavier	Orange County, California
F	26	Ilay Dolinski	6 ft 9 in (2.06 m)	230 lb (104 kg)	Fr	Ironi Kiryat Ata B.C.	Tel Aviv, Israel
C	77	Abdulai Fanta Kabba	7 ft 0 in (2.13 m)	235 lb (107 kg)	Jr	Western Carolina	Kenema, Sierra Leone

Head coach

- Shaheen Holloway (Seton Hall)

Assistant coach(es)

- Donald Copeland (Seton Hall)
- Rasheen Davis (New Rochelle)
- Ryan Whalen (Saint Joseph's)
- Andrew Francis (Southampton)

Legend

- (C) Team captain
- (S) Suspended
- (I) Ineligible
- (W) Walk-on
- Injured
- Current redshirt

Roster

== Schedule and results ==
Date time, TV	Rank^{#}	Opponent^{#}	Result	Record	High points	High rebounds	High assists	Site (attendance) city, state
Exhibition
October 24, 2026*; 7:00 p.m.		at Monmouth	W 53–50		10 – Tied	9 – Fisher	4 – Anderson	OceanFirst Bank Center (1,982); West Long Branch, NJ
Non-conference regular season
November 2, 2026*; 7:30 p.m., ESPN+		Saint Peter's	W 66–42	1–0	15 – Anderson	5 – Wol	3 – Tied	Prudential Center (6,447); Newark, NJ
November 5, 2026*; 6:30 p.m., TruTV		LIU	W 67–60	2–0	19 – Anderson	7 – Tied	5 – Fisher	Walsh Gymnasium (1,296); South Orange, NJ
November 9, 2026*; 9:00 p.m., ESPN+		vs. Charlotte; The Blueprint	W 68–62	3–0	17 – Anderson	8 – Fisher	6 – Petrovic	Palestra (7,743); Philadelphia, PA
November 13, 2026*; 9:00 p.m., SECN		at No. 18 Alabama	L 76–82	3–1	15 – Dolinski	7 – Williams	3 – Tied	Coleman Coliseum (11,510); Tuscaloosa, AL
November 19, 2026*; 8:30 p.m., CBSSN		vs. Wisconsin; Bahamas Championship Semifinal	W 74–69	4–1	21 – Parker	5 – Parker	3 – Petrovic	Baha Mar Convention Center (1,447); Nassau, The Bahamas
November 20, 2026*; 9:30 p.m., CBSSN		vs. NC State; Bahamas Championship Game	W 87–81 ^{OT}	5–1	24 – Brown Jr.	9 – Copeland Jr.	5 – Petrovic	Baha Mar Convention Center (1,247); Nassau, The Bahamas
November 24, 2026*; 7:00 p.m., ESPN+		New Hampshire						Prudential Center; Newark, NJ
November 28, 2026*; 12:00 p.m., ESPN+		Siena						Prudential Center; Newark, NJ
December 4, 2026*; 7:00 p.m., TruTV		Kansas State						Prudential Center; Newark, NJ
December 7, 2026*; 7:00 p.m., ESPN+		NJIT						Prudential Center; Newark, NJ
December 12, 2026*; 4:30 p.m., FS1		at Rutgers; Garden State Hardwood Classic						Jersey Mike's Arena; Piscataway, NJ
December 15, 2026*; 7:00 p.m., ESPN+		UNC Greensboro						Walsh Gymnasium; South Orange, NJ
Big East regular season
December 19, 2026; 12:00 p.m., TruTV		at Georgetown						Capital One Arena; Washington, D.C.
December 23, 2026; 8:00 p.m., FS1		St. John's						Prudential Center; Newark, NJ
December 30, 2026; 4:00 p.m., TruTV		at DePaul						Wintrust Arena; Chicago, IL
January 2, 2027; 12:00 p.m., FS1		at Xavier						Cintas Center; Cincinnati, OH
January 6, 2027; 6:00 p.m., Peacock		Creighton						Prudential Center; Newark, NJ
January 9, 2027; 7:00 p.m., NBCSN/Peacock		UConn						Prudential Center; Newark, NJ
January 12, 2027; 6:00 p.m., NBCSN/Peacock		at Villanova						Finneran Pavilion; Villanova, PA
January 15, 2027; 8:00 p.m., FS1		Georgetown						Prudential Center; Newark, NJ
January 23, 2027; 12:00 p.m., NBCSN/Peacock		at St. John's						Madison Square Garden; New York, NY
January 27, 2027; 6:30 p.m., FS1		Marquette						Prudential Center; Newark, NJ
January 30, 2027; 12:00 p.m., FS1		at Providence						Amica Mutual Pavilion; Providence, RI
February 3, 2027; 6:30 p.m., FS1		Butler						Prudential Center; Newark, NJ
February 7, 2027; 2:30 p.m., FS1		DePaul						Prudential Center; Newark, NJ
February 10, 2027; 8:00 p.m., NBCSN/Peacock		Villanova						Prudential Center; Newark, NJ
February 14, 2027; 3:00 p.m., FS1		Creighton						CHI Health Center Omaha; Omaha, NE
February 17, 2027; 8:00 p.m., Peacock		at UConn						Harry A. Gampel Pavilion; Storrs, CT
February 20, 2027; 8:30 p.m., FS1		Providence						Prudential Center; Newark, NJ
February 23, 2027; 9:00 p.m., TNT		at Marquette						Fiserv Forum; Milwaukee, WI
February 28, 2027; 12:00 p.m., FS1		Xavier						Prudential Center; Newark, NJ
March 6, 2027; 1:30 p.m., FS1		at Butler						Hinkle Fieldhouse; Indianapolis, IN
*Non-conference game. ^{#}Rankings from AP poll. (#) Tournament seedings in parentheses. All times are in Eastern Time.
