= 2026–27 Marquette Golden Eagles men's basketball team =

American college basketball season

2026–27 Marquette Golden Eagles men's basketball
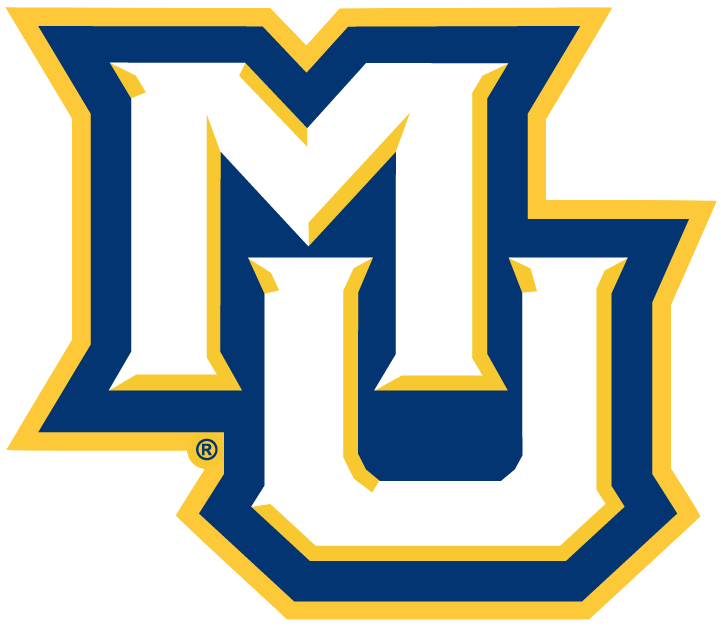
- Conference: Big East Conference
- Record: 3–2 (0–0 Big East)
- Head coach: Shaka Smart (6th season)
- Assistant coaches: Neill Berry (6th season); Cody Hatt (6th season); C.J. Rivers (3rd season); Jeremy Ballard (1st season); Rodney Crawford (1st season)
- Home arena: Fiserv Forum (Capacity: 17,341)

2026–27 Big East men's basketball standings
	Conf.				Overall
Team	W		L	PCT	W		L	PCT
Georgetown	0	–	0	–	6	–	0	1.000
DePaul	0	–	0	–	5	–	0	1.000
No. 13 St. John's	0	–	0	–	5	–	0	1.000
Seton Hall	0	–	0	–	5	–	1	.833
Xavier	0	–	0	–	5	–	1	.833
Creighton	0	–	0	–	4	–	1	.800
Providence	0	–	0	–	4	–	1	.800
No. 3 UConn	0	–	0	–	4	–	1	.800
Butler	0	–	0	–	4	–	2	.667
Villanova	0	–	0	–	4	–	2	.667
Marquette	0	–	0	–	3	–	2	.600
† 2027 Big East tournament winner As of November 22, 2026; Rankings from AP poll

The 2026–27 Marquette Golden Eagles men's basketball team represented Marquette University during the 2026–27 NCAA Division I men's basketball season. The Golden Eagles, led by sixth-year head coach Shaka Smart, played their home games at Fiserv Forum in Milwaukee, Wisconsin as a member of the Big East Conference.

== Previous season ==
The Golden Eagles finished the 2025–26 season 12–20, 7–13 in Big East play to finish in a three-way tie for seventh place. As a No. 7 seed in the Big East tournament they were defeated by Xavier in the first round. The team failed to qualify for any post-season tournaments.

== Offseason ==
=== Departures ===
Departures
Name	Number	Pos.	Height	Weight	Year	Hometown	Reason for departure
Chase Ross	2	G	6'5"	210	Senior	Dallas, TX	Graduated
Tre Norman	5	G	6'4"	205	Junior	Boston, MA	Transferred to Milwaukee
Sheek Pearson	6	F	6'11"	205	Freshman	St. Louis, MO	Transferred to Saint Louis
Zaide Lowery	7	G	6'5"	205	Junior	Springfield, MO	Left Team Due to Undisclosed Reasons; Transferred to Dayton
Ben Gold	12	F	6'11"	235	Senior	Wellington, New Zealand	Graduated
Sean Jones	22	G	5'10"	185	Redshirt Junior	Columbus, OH	Transferred to Toledo
Casey O'Malley	40	G	6'3"	200	Senior	Omaha, NE	Walk-on; Graduated
Jonah Lucas	41	G	6'1"	180	Senior	West Lafayette, IN	Walk-on; Graduated

=== Incoming transfers ===
During a 2026 matchup against Xavier, a sideline report by TNT reporter Jared Greenberg said that head coach Shaka Smart will break his current mold and utilize the transfer portal.

Incoming Transfers
Name	Number	Pos.	Height	Weight	Year	Hometown	Previous School
Colin Porter	2	G	5'10"	170	Graduate Student	Ashland, KY	Liberty
Nolan Minessale	4	G	6'5"	200	Junior	Brookfield, WI	St. Thomas
Sananda Fru	11	F	6'11"	250	Senior	Berlin, Germany	Louisville

=== Staff Changes ===
On April 1, 2026, Assistant Coach Nevada Smith accepted an offer to become the head coach of Siena. Additionally, it was announced on April 7, that Assistant Coach DeAndre Haynes left the program at the conclusion of the 2025-26 season. That same day, former Florida International University Basketball Coach Jeremy Ballard was announced as a new assistant coach, having served as an assistant under Shaka Smart at Virginia Commonwealth University from 2012-2015.

=== 2026 recruiting class ===
College recruiting
Name	Hometown	School	Height	Weight	Commit date
Alex Egbuonu #33 SF	Nashua, NH	Lawrence Academy	6 ft 7 in (2.01 m)	220 lb (100 kg)	Nov 6, 2025
Alex Egbuonu #33 SF	Recruit ratings: Rivals: 247Sports: ESPN: (85)				
Ethan Johnston #23 SG	Pottstown, PA	The Hill School	6 ft 6 in (1.98 m)	185 lb (84 kg)	May 7, 2025
Ethan Johnston #23 SG	Recruit ratings: Rivals: 247Sports: ESPN: (80)				
Nash Walker; SG	Smithton, Tasmania	NBA Global Academy	6 ft 6 in (1.98 m)	175 lb (79 kg)	Jul 9, 2025
Nash Walker; SG	Recruit ratings: No ratings found				
Colton Crowdis; PG	Toronto, Ontario	Bridgton Academy	6 ft 4 in (1.93 m)	180 lb (82 kg)	May 16, 2026
Colton Crowdis; PG	Recruit ratings: No ratings found				
Overall recruit ranking: Rivals: 66 247Sports: 45 ESPN: N/A
Note: In many cases, Scout, Rivals, 247Sports, On3, and ESPN may conflict in their listings of height and weight.; In these cases, the average was taken. ESPN grades are on a 100-point scale.; Sources: "2026 Marquette Basketball Commitments". Rivals.; "2026 Team Ranking". Rivals.

== Roster ==
2026–27 Marquette Golden Eagles men's basketball team
Players
Coaches

Pos.	#	Name	Height	Weight	Year	Previous school	Hometown
G	0	Nigel James Jr.	6 ft 0 in (1.83 m)	195 lb (88 kg)	So	Long Island Lutheran HS	Huntington, NY
G	1	Nash Walker	6 ft 6 in (1.98 m)	205 lb (93 kg)	Fr	NBA Global Academy	Smithton, Tasmania
G	2	Colin Porter	5 ft 10 in (1.78 m)	170 lb (77 kg)	GS	Liberty	Ashland, KY
G	4	Nolan Minessale	6 ft 5 in (1.96 m)	195 lb (88 kg)	Jr	University of St. Thomas (MN)	Brookfield, WI
G	5	Colton Crowdis	6 ft 4 in (1.93 m)	180 lb (82 kg)	Fr	Bridgton Academy	Toronto, Ontario
F	7	Ian Miletic	6 ft 7 in (2.01 m)	205 lb (93 kg)	RS Fr	Rolling Meadows HS	Rolling Meadows, IL
F	8	Joshua Clark	7 ft 1 in (2.16 m)	245 lb (111 kg)	RS So	Clements HS	Virginia Beach, VA
F	9	Damarius Owens	6 ft 7 in (2.01 m)	205 lb (93 kg)	Jr	Western Reserve Academy	Rochester, NY
G	10	Adrien Stevens	6 ft 4 in (1.93 m)	215 lb (98 kg)	So	Bullis School	Potomac, MD
F	11	Sananda Fru	6 ft 11 in (2.11 m)	250 lb (113 kg)	Sr	University of Louisville	Berlin, Germany
F	13	Royce Parham	6 ft 9 in (2.06 m)	230 lb (104 kg)	Jr	Western Reserve Academy	Pittsburgh, PA
F	18	Caedin Hamilton	6 ft 9 in (2.06 m)	245 lb (111 kg)	RS Jr	St. Joseph HS	Santa Maria, CA
F	21	Alex Egbuonu	6 ft 7 in (2.01 m)	235 lb (107 kg)	Fr	Lawrence Academy	Nashua, NH
G	33	Ethan Johnston	6 ft 7 in (2.01 m)	210 lb (95 kg)	Fr	The Hill School	Pottstown, PA
F	35	Michael Phillips II	6 ft 6 in (1.98 m)	205 lb (93 kg)	So	Grace Christian School	Raleigh, NC
F	42	Braeden Brenn (W)	6 ft 8 in (2.03 m)	215 lb (98 kg)	RS So	St. Mary Catholic HS	Appleton, WI

Head coach

- Shaka Smart (Kenyon)

Assistant coach(es)

- Neill Berry (Southeastern Louisiana)
- Cody Hatt (Norwich)
- C.J. Rivers (Drake)
- Jeremy Ballard (Colgate)
- Rodney Crawford (Cincinnati)

Legend

- (C) Team captain
- (S) Suspended
- (I) Ineligible
- (W) Walk-on
- Injured
- Current redshirt

Roster
Last update: 06/05/2026

== Schedule and results ==
Date time, TV	Rank^{#}	Opponent^{#}	Result	Record	High points	High rebounds	High assists	Site (attendance) city, state
Vancouver, British Columbia Foreign Tour
July 29, 2026*; 5:00 p.m.		vs. Calgary	W 102–49		20 – Parham	6 – Tied	10 – James Jr.	Alumni Gymnasium; Langley, BC
July 30, 2026*; 9:00 p.m.		vs. Trinity Western	W 89–59		15 – Parham	13 – Parham	4 – Tied	David E. Enarson Gymnasium; Langley, BC
August 1, 2026*; 4:00 p.m.		vs. Fraser Valley	W 102–65		15 – Phillips II	9 – Fru	7 – James Jr.	UFV Athletic Centre; Abbotsford, BC
Non-Conference Exhibition Matches
October 19, 2026*; 6:30 p.m.		at Green Bay	W 87–60		18 – James Jr.	6 – Clark	10 – James Jr.	Resch Center (3,122); Green Bay, WI
October 25, 2026*; 12:00 p.m., YouTube		No. 6 Michigan State	W 86–79		14 – Egbuonu	8 – Parham	7 – James Jr.	Fiserv Forum (13,020); Milwaukee, WI
Non-Conference Regular Season
November 2, 2026*; 6:30 p.m., ESPN+		Mercyhurst	W 78–43	1–0	18 – Clark	12 – Fru	4 – Stevens	Fiserv Forum (12,063); Milwaukee, WI
November 6, 2026*; 7:00 p.m., ESPN+		Detroit Mercy; Students Only Game	W 93–32	2–0	16 – Egbuonu	8 – Tied	8 – James Jr.	Al McGuire Center (3,750); Milwaukee, WI
November 11, 2026*; 6:00 p.m., FS1		at No. 20 Michigan	L 70–84	2–1	21 – Porter	6 – Parham	3 – Stevens	Crisler Center (11,357); Ann Arbor, MI
November 15, 2026*; 1:30 p.m., Peacock / NBCSN		vs. Missouri; Old Trapper Legends Classic	L 64–69	2–2	11 – James Jr.	9 – Parham	11 – James Jr.	United Center (6,191); Chicago, IL
November 18, 2026*; 6:30 p.m., ESPN+		Northern Illinois	W 79–65	3–2	17 – Fru	12 – Fru	5 – Parham	Fiserv Forum (12,157); Milwaukee, WI
November 22, 2026*; 12:00 p.m., ESPN+		Chicago State	W 106-62	4-2	18 – Stevens	5 – Minessale	7 – James Jr.	Fiserv Forum (12,311); Milwaukee, WI
November 25, 2026*; 11:00 a.m., ESPN		vs. Virginia; Battle 4 Atlantis Bracket 2 Game 1						Imperial Arena; Paradise Island, Bahamas
November 27, 2026*; 4:00 p.m., SECN		vs. Texas A&M; Battle 4 Atlantis Bracket 2 Game 2						Imperial Arena; Paradise Island, Bahamas
December 1, 2026*; 6:30 p.m., ESPN+		Wagner						Fiserv Forum; Milwaukee, WI
December 5, 2026*; 1:00 p.m., Peacock / NBCSN		Wisconsin; Rivalry						Fiserv Forum; Milwaukee, WI
December 9, 2026*; 6:30 p.m., ESPN+		New Hampshire						Fiserv Forum; Milwaukee, WI
December 12, 2026*; 5:30 p.m., FS1		Mississippi State						Fiserv Forum; Milwaukee, WI
Big East Regular Season
December 19, 2026; 5:30 p.m., Peacock / NBCSN		Xavier						Fiserv Forum; Milwaukee, WI
December 23, 2026; 5:00 p.m., FS1		at Butler						Hinkle Fieldhouse; Indianapolis, IN
December 31, 2026; 4:00 p.m., Peacock / NBCSN		at Creighton						CHI Health Center Omaha; Omaha, NE
January 5, 2027; 7:00 p.m., Peacock		Providence						Fiserv Forum; Milwaukee, WI
January 9, 2027; 4:00 p.m., Peacock / NBCSN		at Villanova						Finneran Pavilion; Villanova, PA
January 12, 2027; 6:00 p.m., TNT		at UConn						PeoplesBank Arena; Hartford, CT
January 16, 2027; 12:30 p.m., TNT		DePaul						Fiserv Forum; Milwaukee, WI
January 20, 2027; 6:00 p.m., FS1		Creighton						Fiserv Forum; Milwaukee, WI
January 23, 2027; 1:00 p.m., TNT		at Xavier						Cintas Center; Cincinnati, OH
January 27, 2027; 5:30 p.m., FS1		at Seton Hall						Prudential Center; Newark, NJ
January 30, 2027; 1:30 p.m., TNT		Butler						Fiserv Forum; Milwaukee, WI
February 2, 2027; 6:30 p.m., TNT		St. John's						Fiserv Forum; Milwaukee, WI
February 6, 2027; 1:30 p.m., TNT		Georgetown; National Marquette Day						Fiserv Forum; Milwaukee, WI
February 10, 2027; 6:00 p.m., Peacock		at Providence						Amica Mutual Pavilion; Providience, RI
February 17, 2027; 6:00 p.m., Peacock / NBCSN		at St. John's						Madison Square Garden; New York, NY
February 20, 2027; 1:30 p.m., FOX		UConn						Fiserv Forum; Milwaukee, WI
February 23, 2027; 8:00 p.m., TNT		Seton Hall						Fiserv Forum; Milwaukee, WI
February 26, 2027; 8:00 p.m., FS1		Villanova						Fiserv Forum; Milwaukee, WI
March 2, 2027; 5:30 p.m., FS1		at Georgetown						Capital One Arena; Washington, D.C.
March 6, 2027; 6:00 p.m., Peacock / NBCSN		at DePaul						Wintrust Arena; Chicago, IL
Big East Tournament
March 10, 2027		vs. TBD; First Round						Madison Square Garden; New York, NY
*Non-conference game. ^{#}Rankings from AP Poll. (#) Tournament seedings in parentheses. All times are in Central Time.
