= 2026–27 Butler Bulldogs men's basketball team =

College basketball season

2026–27 Butler Bulldogs men's basketball
- Conference: Big East Conference
- Record: 4–3 (0–0 Big East)
- Head coach: Ronald Nored (1st season)
- Assistant coaches: Tony Bollier (1st season); Kotie Kimble (1st season); Jon Diebler (3rd season); Jalen Courtney-Williams (1st season); Emerson Kampen (7th season)
- Home arena: Hinkle Fieldhouse

2026–27 Big East men's basketball standings
	Conf.				Overall
Team	W		L	PCT	W		L	PCT
Georgetown	0	–	0	–	6	–	0	1.000
DePaul	0	–	0	–	5	–	0	1.000
No. 13 St. John's	0	–	0	–	5	–	0	1.000
Seton Hall	0	–	0	–	5	–	1	.833
Xavier	0	–	0	–	5	–	1	.833
Creighton	0	–	0	–	4	–	1	.800
Providence	0	–	0	–	4	–	1	.800
No. 3 UConn	0	–	0	–	4	–	1	.800
Butler	0	–	0	–	4	–	2	.667
Villanova	0	–	0	–	4	–	2	.667
Marquette	0	–	0	–	3	–	2	.600
† 2027 Big East tournament winner As of November 22, 2026; Rankings from AP poll

The 2026–27 Butler Bulldogs men's basketball team represent Butler University in the 2026–27 NCAA Division I men's basketball season. They are led by Ronald Nored, in his first-year as head coach of his alma mater. The Bulldogs play their home games at Hinkle Fieldhouse in Indianapolis, Indiana, as members of the Big East Conference.

== Previous season ==
The Bulldogs finished the 2024–25 season 16–16, 7–13 in Big East play to finish in a tie for seventh place. As No. 8 seed in the Big East tournament they were defeated by Providence in the first round. Head coach, Thad Matta, retired at the end of the season.

== Offseason ==
=== Departures ===
Name	Number	Pos.	Height	Weight	Year	Hometown	Reason for departure
Michael Ajayi	5	F	6'7"	235	Graduate Student	Kent, WA	Graduated, signed with the Charlotte Hornets
Finley Bizjack	11	G	6'3"	170	Junior	Trophy Club, TX	Transferred to West Virginia
Yame Butler	8	G	6'5"	210	Graduate Student	Greenbelt, MD	Graduated
Efeosa Oliogu-Elabor	4	F	6'6"	220	Freshman	Markham, ON	Transferred to George Mason
Evan Haywood	1	G	6'4"	180	Sophomore	Carmel, IN	Transferred to Pepperdine
Jamie Kaiser Jr.	7	G/F	6'6"	210	Sophomore	Burke, VA	Transferred to Richmond
Jackson Keith	0	F	6'5"	175	Freshman	Durham, NC	Transferred to Davidson
Jack McCaffery	6	F	6'9"	215	Freshman	Iowa City, IA	Transferred to Richmond
Azavier Robinson	23	G	6'2"	195	Freshman	Indianapolis, IN	Transferred to UCLA
Yohan Traoré	21	F/C	6'11"	240	Senior	Tours, France	Entered transfer portal

=== Incoming transfers ===
Name	Number	Pos.	Height	Weight	Year	Hometown	Previous school	Seasons Remaining
Treyson Anderson	44	G	6'9"	240	Junior	Lincoln, NE	North Dakota State	Two
Samis Calderon	6	F	6'8"	210	Sophomore	Vitória, Brazil	Gonzaga	Three
Jordan Ellerbee	2	G	6'3"	180	Sophomore	Philadelphia, PA	Florida Gulf Coast	Three
Eduardo Klafke	8	G	6'5"	200	Junior	Franca, Brazil	Ole Miss	Two
Christian Moore	5	F	6'6"	230	Graduate Student	Los Angeles, CA	The Citadel	One

=== Recruiting classes ===
==== 2026 recruiting class ====
College recruiting
Name	Hometown	School	Height	Weight	Commit date
Herly Brutus; SG	The Villages, FL	The Villages Charter Schools	6 ft 5 in (1.96 m)	180 lb (82 kg)	Apr 7, 2026
Herly Brutus; SG	Recruit ratings: Rivals: 247Sports: ESPN: (82)				
Marco Maric; C	Zagreb, Croatia		7 ft 0 in (2.13 m)	180 lb (82 kg)	Apr 29, 2026
Marco Maric; C	Recruit ratings: Rivals: 247Sports: ESPN: (NR)				
Baron Walker; SG	Noblesville, IN	Noblesville High School	6 ft 3 in (1.91 m)	180 lb (82 kg)	Jul 30, 2025
Baron Walker; SG	Recruit ratings: Rivals: 247Sports: ESPN: (NR)				
Overall recruit ranking:
Note: In many cases, Scout, Rivals, 247Sports, On3, and ESPN may conflict in their listings of height and weight.; In these cases, the average was taken. ESPN grades are on a 100-point scale.; Sources: "ESPN - Butler Bulldogs Men's Basketball Recruiting". ESPN.

==== 2027 recruiting class ====
College recruiting (2027)
Name	Hometown	School	Height	Weight	Commit date
J'Lon Lyons; PG	Clinton, MD	Grace Brethren Christian School	6 ft 2 in (1.88 m)	165 lb (75 kg)	Aug 25, 2026
J'Lon Lyons; PG	Recruit ratings: Rivals: 247Sports: ESPN: (86)				
Overall recruit ranking:
Note: In many cases, Scout, Rivals, 247Sports, On3, and ESPN may conflict in their listings of height and weight.; In these cases, the average was taken. ESPN grades are on a 100-point scale.; Sources: "ESPN - Butler Bulldogs Men's Basketball Recruiting". ESPN.

== Roster ==
2026–27 Butler Bulldogs men's basketball team
Players
Coaches

Pos.	#	Name	Height	Weight	Year	Previous school	Hometown
F	0	Herly Brutus	6 ft 7 in (2.01 m)	210 lb (95 kg)	Fr	The Villages Charter Schools	Eustis, FL
G	1	Jalen Jackson	6 ft 2 in (1.88 m)	200 lb (91 kg)	GS	Purdue Fort Wayne	Fort Wayne, IN
G	2	Jordan Ellerbee	6 ft 3 in (1.91 m)	180 lb (82 kg)	So	Florida Gulf Coast	Philadelphia, PA
G	3	Ethan McComb (W)	6 ft 1 in (1.85 m)	190 lb (86 kg)	Sr	Center Grove	Greenwood, IN
G	4	Baron Walker	6 ft 3 in (1.91 m)	190 lb (86 kg)	Fr	Noblesville	Noblesville, IN
F	4	Christian Moore	6 ft 6 in (1.98 m)	230 lb (104 kg)	GS	The Citadel	Los Angeles, CA
F	6	Samis Calderon	6 ft 8 in (2.03 m)	210 lb (95 kg)	So	Kansas	Vitória, Brazil
G	8	Eduardo Klafke	6 ft 5 in (1.96 m)	200 lb (91 kg)	Jr	Ole Miss	Franca, Brazil
F	11	Marko Maric	7 ft 0 in (2.13 m)	210 lb (95 kg)	Fr	Novi Zagreb	Zagreb, Croatia
G	12	Samu Adler	6 ft 6 in (1.98 m)	225 lb (102 kg)	Fr	Salon Vilpas	Espoo, Finland
C	13	Drayton Jones	6 ft 11 in (2.11 m)	250 lb (113 kg)	Sr	South Carolina State	Houston, TX
C	13	Asim Djulovic	6 ft 8 in (2.03 m)	220 lb (100 kg)	Fr	Mega Superbet	Novi Pazar, Serbia
F	35	Bryson Cardinal (W)	6 ft 7 in (2.01 m)	205 lb (93 kg)	RS Fr	Guerin Catholic	Westfield, IN
C	39	Kevin Ndzie	7 ft 1 in (2.16 m)	250 lb (113 kg)	RS Jr	Urania Milano	Yaoundé, Cameroon
F	44	Treyson Anderson	6 ft 9 in (2.06 m)	240 lb (109 kg)	Jr	North Dakota State	Lincoln, NE

Head coach

- Ronald Nored (Butler)

Assistant coach(es)

- Tony Bollier (Wheaton)
- Kotie Kimble (Coastal Carolina)
- Jon Diebler (Ohio State)
- Jalen Courtney-Williams (Morehead State)
- Emerson Kampen (Butler)

Legend

- (C) Team captain
- (S) Suspended
- (I) Ineligible
- (W) Walk-on
- Injured
- Current redshirt

Roster

== Schedule and results ==
Date time, TV	Rank^{#}	Opponent^{#}	Result	Record	High points	High rebounds	High assists	Site (attendance) city, state
Exhibition
October 11, 2026*; 6:30 p.m., WISH		Indiana	L 68–96	–	17 – Jackson	6 – Klafke	5 – Tied	Hinkle Fieldhouse (9,100); Indianapolis, IN
October 18, 2026*; 6:30 p.m., WISH		Indiana State	W 81–74	–	19 – Jackson	9 – Jones	7 – Jackson	Hinkle Fieldhouse (5,783); Indianapolis, IN
October 25, 2026*; 2:00 p.m., B1G+		at Ohio State	L 73–82	–	27 – Jackson	7 – Jones	5 – Adler	Value City Arena; Columbus, OH
Regular season
November 2, 2026*; 7:00 p.m., ESPN+		Lafayette	W 96–60	1–0	19 – Djulovic	8 – Jones	8 – Klafke	Hinkle Fieldhouse (6,555); Indianapolis, IN
November 4, 2026*; 7:00 p.m., ESPN+		Fairleigh Dickinson	W 99–65	2–0	25 – Djulovic	6 – 3 Tied	8 – Jackson	Hinkle Fieldhouse (5,833); Indianapolis, IN
November 8, 2026*; 2:00 p.m., USA		at Boise State	L 81–100	2–1	19 – Tied	13 – Anderson	3 – Tied	ExtraMile Arena (8,933); Boise, ID
November 13, 2026*; 6:30 p.m., Peacock		Pittsburgh	L 64–76	2–2	16 – Klafke	8 – Klafke	2 – Tied	Hinkle Fieldhouse (7,345); Indianapolis, IN
November 17, 2026*; 7:00 p.m., ESPN+		Western Carolina	W 89–64	3–2	17 – Tied	8 – Tied	6 – Klafke	Hinkle Fieldhouse (5,339); Indianapolis, IN
November 19, 2026*; 7:00 p.m., TruTV		Northeastern	W 84–77	4–2	28 – Djulovic	10 – Djulovic	7 – Tied	Hinkle Fieldhouse (5,866); Indianapolis, IN
November 22, 2026*; 12:00 p.m., FS1		vs. No. 24 Nebraska; The Bad Boy Mowers Series	L 74–76	4–3	28 – Djulovic	13 – Jones	5 – Jones	Credit Union 1 Arena (1,138); Chicago, IL
November 27, 2026*; 3:00 p.m., ESPN+		Eastern Michigan						Hinkle Fieldhouse; Indianapolis, IN
December 2, 2026*; 7:00 p.m., ESPN+		Presbyterian						Hinkle Fieldhouse; Indianapolis, IN
December 6, 2026*; 3:00 p.m., ESPN2		at North Carolina						Dean Smith Center; Chapel Hill, NC
December 12, 2026; 2:00 p.m., Peacock		at Providence						Amica Mutual Pavilion; Providence, RI
December 16, 2026*; 7:00 p.m., ESPN+		USC Upstate						Hinkle Fieldhouse; Indianapolis, IN
December 19, 2026*; 3:00 p.m., FS1		vs. Georgia Tech; Indy Classic						Gainbridge Fieldhouse; Indianapolis, IN
December 23, 2026; 6:00 p.m., FS1		at Marquette						Hinkle Fieldhouse; Indianapolis, IN
December 31, 2026; 7:00 p.m., FS1		UConn						Hinkle Fieldhouse; Indianapolis, IN
January 3, 2027; 5:00 p.m., FS1		St. John's						Hinkle Fieldhouse; Indianapolis, IN
January 9, 2027; 4:00 p.m., FS1		at DePaul						Wintrust Arena; Chicago, IL
January 12, 2027; 8:00 p.m., FS1		at Xavier						Cintas Center; Cincinnati, OH
January 15, 2027; 6:30 p.m., FS1		Villanova						Hinkle Fieldhouse; Indianapolis, IN
January 18, 2027; 6:30 p.m., FS1		Georgetown						Hinkle Fieldhouse; Indianapolis, IN
January 23, 2027; 12:00 p.m., TNT		at UConn						PeoplesBank Arena; Hartford, CT
January 27, 2027; 7:00 p.m., TruTV		Providence						Hinkle Fieldhouse; Indianapolis, IN
January 30, 2027; 7:00 p.m., TNT		at Marquette						Fiserv Forum; Milwaukee, WI
February 3, 2027; 2:00 p.m., FS1		at Seton Hall						Prudential Center; Newark, NJ
February 6, 2027; 3:30 p.m., TNT		Xavier						Hinkle Fieldhouse; Indianapolis, IN
February 13, 2027; 12:00 p.m., Peacock		at Georgetown						Capital One Arena; Washington, D.C.
February 17, 2027; 8:30 p.m., truTv		Creighton						Hinkle Fieldhouse; Indianapolis, IN
February 20, 2027; 12:00 p.m., FS1		at Villlanova						Finneran Pavilion; Villanova, PA
February 23, 2027; 8:00 p.m., FS1		DePaul						Hinkle Fieldhouse; Indianapolis, IN
February 27, 2027; 1:00 p.m., TNT		St. John's						Madison Square Garden; New York, NY
March 2, 2027; 9:30 p.m., TNT		at Creighton						CHI Health Center Omaha; Omaha, NE
March 6, 2027; 9:30 p.m., FS1		Seton Hall						Hinkle Fieldhouse; Indianapolis, IN
Big East tournament
March 10-13, 2027; Peacock/FS1/FOX		vs.						Madison Square Garden; New York, NY
*Non-conference game. ^{#}Rankings from AP Poll. (#) Tournament seedings in parentheses. All times are in Eastern Time.

== See also ==
2026–27 Butler Bulldogs women's basketball team
