= 2026–27 Villanova Wildcats men's basketball team =

American college basketball season

2026–27 Villanova Wildcats men's basketball
- Conference: Big East Conference
- Record: 4–2 (0–0 Big East)
- Head coach: Kevin Willard (2nd season)
- Associate head coach: David Cox (2nd season)
- Assistant coaches: Kevin Norris (2nd season); Ashley Howard (3rd season); Greg Manning Jr. (2nd season); Ricky Harris (2nd season)
- Home arena: Finneran Pavilion; Xfinity Mobile Arena

2026–27 Big East men's basketball standings
	Conf.				Overall
Team	W		L	PCT	W		L	PCT
Georgetown	0	–	0	–	6	–	0	1.000
DePaul	0	–	0	–	5	–	0	1.000
No. 13 St. John's	0	–	0	–	5	–	0	1.000
Seton Hall	0	–	0	–	5	–	1	.833
Xavier	0	–	0	–	5	–	1	.833
Creighton	0	–	0	–	4	–	1	.800
Providence	0	–	0	–	4	–	1	.800
No. 3 UConn	0	–	0	–	4	–	1	.800
Butler	0	–	0	–	4	–	2	.667
Villanova	0	–	0	–	4	–	2	.667
Marquette	0	–	0	–	3	–	2	.600
† 2027 Big East tournament winner As of November 22, 2026; Rankings from AP poll

The 2026–27 Villanova Wildcats men's basketball team represents Villanova University in the 2026–27 NCAA Division I men's basketball season. The Wildcats are led by second-year head coach Kevin Willard, and play their home games at the Finneran Pavilion on the school's campus in the Philadelphia suburb of Villanova, Pennsylvania and Xfinity Mobile Arena as members of the Big East Conference.

== Previous season ==
The Wildcats finished the 2025–26 season with a 24–9 record, 15–5 in Big East play to finish in third place. In the Big East tournament, they were upset by Georgetown in the first round. They received an at-large bid to the 2026 NCAA tournament as the No. 8 seed in the West region, where they were defeated in the first round 86–76 by Utah State.

== Offseason ==
=== Departures ===
All players listed as "graduated" are tentative departures unless otherwise noted.

Villanova Departures
Name	Number	Pos.	Height	Weight	Year	Hometown	Reason for Departure
Chris Jeffrey	0	G	6'3"	200	Freshman	Brooklyn, New York	Transferred to Loyola Chicago
Zion Stanford	1	G	6'6"	205	Junior	Philadelphia, Pennsylvania	Transferred to Towson
Bryce Lindsay	2	G	6'3"	194	(redshirt) Sophomore	Baltimore, Maryland	Transferred to Indiana
Devin Askew	5	G	6'5"	195	Graduate Student	Sacramento, California	Graduated
Tafara Gapare	6	G	6'9"	215	Senior	Wellington, New Zealand	Graduated; Transferred to Coppin State
Malachi Palmer	7	G	6'6"	212	Sophomore	Harrisburg, Pennsylvania	Transferred to Minnesota
Malcolm Flaggs	15	G	6'6"	212	(redshirt) Junior	Tuba City, Arizona	Entered Transfer Portal
Braden Pierce	17	C	7'0"	245	(redshirt) Senior	Woodstock, Georgia	Transferred to Charleston
Duke Brennan	24	F	6'10	250	Senior	Chandler, Arizona	Graduated; Transferred to Oklahoma
Acaden Lewis	55	G	6'2"	180	Freshman	Washington, D.C.	Transferred to Miami

=== Incoming transfers ===
Villanova incoming transfers
Name	Number	Pos.	Height	Weight	Year	Hometown	Previous school
Elijah Crawford	1	G	6'3"	187	Junior	Augusta, Georgia	UIC
Brady Muller	2	G	6'4"	210	Graduate Student	Wyckoff, New Jersey	Bucknell
Darryl Simmons II	8	G	5'11"	175	Senior	Detroit, Michigan	St. Bonaventure
Abdou Samb	9	F	6'8"	220	(redshirt) Senior	Upper Marlboro, Maryland	Towson
Kwame Evans Jr.	10	F	6'10"	220	Senior	Baltimore, Maryland	Oregon
Devin Royal	21	F	6'6"	230	Senior	Columbus, Ohio	Ohio State
Jake Fiegen	22	G	6'4"	205	Graduate Student	Wilmette, Illinois	Cornell

=== Recruiting class ===
College recruiting
Name	Hometown	School	Height	Weight	Commit date
Adam Oumiddoch; SG	Woodbridge, Virginia	Overtime Elite	6 ft 5 in (1.96 m)	180 lb (82 kg)	Jun 30, 2026
Adam Oumiddoch; SG	Recruit ratings: Rivals: 247Sports: ESPN: (86)				
Luigi Suigo; C	Tradate, Italy	KK Mega Basket	7 ft 3 in (2.21 m)	289 lb (131 kg)	Jun 13, 2026
Luigi Suigo; C	Recruit ratings: Rivals: (NR)				
Carter Fisk; CG	Baltimore, Maryland	Saint Frances Academy	6 ft 2 in (1.88 m)	175 lb (79 kg)	Jun 13, 2026
Carter Fisk; CG	Recruit ratings: No ratings found				
Overall recruit ranking: Rivals: 51
Note: In many cases, Scout, Rivals, 247Sports, On3, and ESPN may conflict in their listings of height and weight.; In these cases, the average was taken. ESPN grades are on a 100-point scale.; Sources: "2026 Villanova Commits". Rivals.; "2026 Team Ranking". Rivals.

== Roster ==
2026–27 Villanova Wildcats men's basketball team
Players
Coaches

Pos.	#	Name	Height	Weight	Year	Previous school	Hometown
G	1	Elijah Crawford	6 ft 3 in (1.91 m)	187 lb (85 kg)	Jr	UIC	Augusta, Georgia
F	2	Brady Muller	6 ft 4 in (1.93 m)	210 lb (95 kg)	GS	Blair Academy	Wyckoff, New Jersey
F	3	Matt Hodge	6 ft 8 in (2.03 m)	220 lb (100 kg)	RS So	St. Rose High School	Belmar, New Jersey
G	4	Tyler Perkins	6 ft 4 in (1.93 m)	212 lb (96 kg)	Sr	Penn	Lorton, Virginia
G	5	Carter Fisk	6 ft 2 in (1.88 m)	175 lb (79 kg)	Fr	Saint Frances Academy	Baltimore, Maryland
G	7	Adam Oumiddoch	6 ft 5 in (1.96 m)	202 lb (92 kg)	Fr	Overtime Elite	Woodbridge, Virginia
G	8	Darryl Simmons II	5 ft 11 in (1.8 m)	175 lb (79 kg)	Sr	St. Bonaventure	Detroit, Michigan
F	9	Abdou Samb	6 ft 8 in (2.03 m)	220 lb (100 kg)	RS Sr	Towson	Upper Marlboro, Maryland
F	10	Kwame Evans	6 ft 10 in (2.08 m)	220 lb (100 kg)	Sr	Oregon	Baltimore, Maryland
G	14	Wade Chiddick	6 ft 4 in (1.93 m)	200 lb (91 kg)	GS	Westtown School	King of Prussia, Pennsylvania
C	15	Nico Onyekwere	7 ft 1 in (2.16 m)	240 lb (109 kg)	RS Fr	Long Island Lutheran High School	Abuja, Nigeria
C	19	Luigi Suigo	7 ft 3 in (2.21 m)	289 lb (131 kg)	Fr	KK Mega Basket	Tradate, Italy
F	21	Devin Royal	6 ft 6 in (1.98 m)	230 lb (104 kg)	Sr	Ohio State	Pickerington, Ohio
G	22	Jake Fiegen	6 ft 4 in (1.93 m)	205 lb (93 kg)	GS	Cornell	Wilmette, Illinois

Head coach

- Kevin Willard (Pittsburgh)

Assistant coach(es)

- David Cox (William & Mary)
- Kevin Norris (Miami (FL))
- Ashley Howard (Drexel)
- Greg Manning Jr. (Loyola (MD))
- Ricky Harris (UMass)

Legend

- (C) Team captain
- (S) Suspended
- (I) Ineligible
- (W) Walk-on
- Injured
- Current redshirt

Roster

== Schedule and results ==
Date time, TV	Rank^{#}	Opponent^{#}	Result	Record	High points	High rebounds	High assists	Site (attendance) city, state
Exhibition
October 11, 2026*; 1:00 p.m., B1G+		at Rutgers	W 77–75	–	20 – Royal	10 – Royal	4 – Royal	Jersey Mike's Arena (5,930); Piscataway, NJ
October 17, 2026*; 1:00 p.m.		George Mason	W 84–67	–	25 – Royal	8 – Royal	6 – Crawford	Finneran Pavilion (3,990); Villanova, PA
October 22, 2026*; 7:00 p.m.		No. 9 Virginia	L 71–93	–	21 – Royal	9 – Perkins	6 – Simmons II	Finneran Pavilion (5,094); Villanova, PA
Regular season
November 1, 2026*; 9:30 a.m., FOX		vs. Notre Dame; Eternal City Tip-Off	L 72–74	0–1	18 – Perkins	8 – Royal	5 – Crawford	Palazzo dello Sport (11,000); Rome, Italy
November 6, 2026*; 7:00 p.m., ESPN+		Holy Cross	W 95–66	1–1	22 – Royal	15 – Suigo	8 – Crawford	Finneran Pavilion (6,501); Villanova, PA
November 10, 2026*; 7:00 p.m., truTV		La Salle; Big 5 Classic Pod 1	W 80–59	2–1	19 – Suigo	12 – Suigo	6 – Crawford	Finneran Pavilion (6,501); Villanova, PA
November 14, 2026*; 7:00 p.m., ESPN+		Rider	W 99–62	3–1	21 – Royal	10 – Evans Jr.	6 – Crawford	Finneran Pavilion (6,501); Villanova, PA
November 17, 2026*; 7:00 p.m., ACCN		at Pittsburgh	L 61–81	3–2	19 – Perkins	7 – Tied	5 – Crawford	Petersen Events Center (6,428); Pittsburgh, PA
November 21, 2026*; 7:00 p.m., FOX		No. 18т Michigan	W 79–73	4–2	23 – Perkins	11 – Evans Jr.	5 – Crawford	Xfinity Mobile Arena (11,625); Phiadelphia, PA
November 24, 2026*; 7:00 p.m., truTV		Coppin State						Finneran Pavilion; Villanova, PA
November 27, 2026*; 5:00 p.m., ESPN2		at Kansas						Allen Fieldhouse; Lawrence, KS
December 1, 2026*; 6:30 p.m., ESPN+		at Temple; Big 5 Classic Pod 1						Liacouras Center; Philadelphia, PA
December 5, 2026*		vs. TBD; Big 5 Classic						Xfinity Mobile Arena; Philadelphia, PA
December 12, 2026*; 12:00 p.m., FOX		vs. Wisconsin; Philly Hoops Showdown						Xfinity Mobile Arena; Philadelphia, PA
December 19, 2026; 8:00 p.m., FOX		at Creighton						CHI Health Center Omaha; Omaha, NE
December 22, 2026; 6:30 p.m., FS1		Providence						Finneran Pavilion; Villanova, PA
December 29, 2026*; 7:00 p.m., truTV		Fairleigh Dickinson						Finneran Pavilion; Villanova, PA
January 3, 2027; 12:00 p.m., Peacock		at Georgetown						Capital One Arena; Washington, DC
January 6, 2027; 7:00 p.m., truTV		at Xavier						Cintas Center; Cincinnati, OH
January 9, 2027; 5:00 p.m., NBCSN/Peacock		Marquette						Finneran Pavilion; Villanova, PA
January 12, 2027; 6:00 p.m., NBCSN/Peacock		Seton Hall						Finneran Pavilion; Villanova, PA
January 15, 2027; 6:00 p.m., FS1		at Butler						Hinkle Fieldhouse; Indianapolis, IN
January 19, 2027; 6:30 p.m., FS1		Xavier						Finneran Pavilion; Villanova, PA
January 22, 2027; 7:00 p.m., FS1		at DePaul						Wintrust Arena; Chicago, IL
January 27, 2027; 7:00 p.m., Peacock		Creighton						Finneran Pavilion; Villanova, PA
February 3, 2027; 7:00 p.m., NBCSN/Peacock		at UConn						PeoplesBank Arena; Hartford, CT
February 6, 2027; 12:30 p.m., FOX		St. John's						Xfinity Mobile Arena; Philadelphia, PA
February 10, 2027; 8:00 p.m., NBCSN/Peacock		at Seton Hall						Prudential Center; Newark, NJ
February 14, 2027; 12:00 p.m., FOX		UConn						Xfinity Mobile Arena; Philadelphia, PA
February 17, 2027; 6:30 p.m., TNT/TruTV		at Providence						Amica Mutual Pavilion; Providence, RI
February 20, 2027; 12:00 p.m., FS1		Butler						Finneran Pavilion; Villanova, PA
February 23, 2027; 7:00 p.m., TNT		at St. John's						Madison Square Garden; New York, NY
February 26, 2027; 9:00 p.m., FS1		at Marquette						Fiserv Forum; Milwaukee, WI
March 3, 2027; 7:00 p.m., Peacock		DePaul						Finneran Pavilion; Villanova, PA
March 6, 2027; 12:30 p.m., TNT/TruTV		Georgetown						Finneran Pavilion; Villanova, PA
*Non-conference game. ^{#}Rankings from AP poll. (#) Tournament seedings in parentheses. All times are in Eastern Time.
