= 2026–27 Providence Friars men's basketball team =

American college basketball season

2026–27 Providence Friars men's basketball
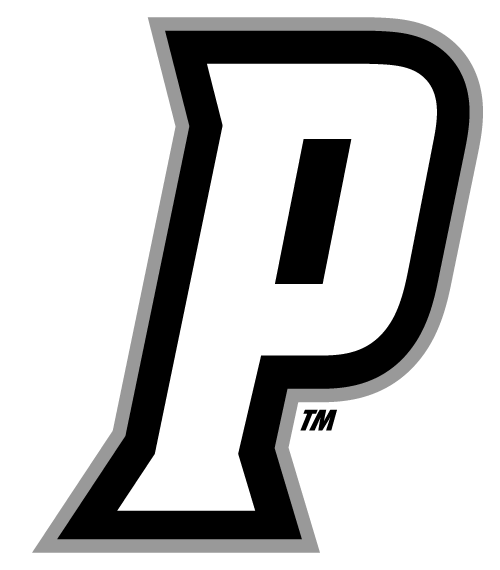
- Conference: Big East Conference
- Record: 4–1 (0–0 Big East)
- Head coach: Bryan Hodgson (1st season)
- Associate head coach: Tee Butters (1st season)
- Assistant coaches: Alex Harris (1st season); James Quarles (1st season); Derek Rongstad (1st season); Logan Ingram (1st season)
- Home arena: Amica Mutual Pavilion

2026–27 Big East men's basketball standings
	Conf.				Overall
Team	W		L	PCT	W		L	PCT
DePaul	0	–	0	–	5	–	0	1.000
Georgetown	0	–	0	–	5	–	0	1.000
No. 13 St. John's	0	–	0	–	5	–	0	1.000
Xavier	0	–	0	–	5	–	0	1.000
Creighton	0	–	0	–	4	–	1	.800
Providence	0	–	0	–	4	–	1	.800
No. 3 UConn	0	–	0	–	4	–	1	.800
Seton Hall	0	–	0	–	3	–	1	.750
Butler	0	–	0	–	3	–	2	.600
Marquette	0	–	0	–	3	–	2	.600
Villanova	0	–	0	–	3	–	2	.600
† 2027 Big East tournament winner As of November 19, 2026; Rankings from AP poll

The 2026–27 Providence Friars men's basketball team represents Providence College during the 2026–27 NCAA Division I men's basketball season. The team is led by 1st-year head coach Bryan Hodgson and plays their home games at Amica Mutual Pavilion in Providence, Rhode Island as a member of the Big East Conference.

== Previous season ==
The Friars finished the 2025–26 season 15–18, 7–13 in Big East play to finish in a tie for seventh place. As No. 9 seed in the Big East tournament they beat Butler in the first round but lost in the second round to St. John's. The following day on March 13, 2026, Providence announced that it was firing head coach Kim English. Later that month, Bryan Hodgson was named head coach.

== Roster ==
2025–26 Providence Friars men's basketball team
Players
Coaches

Pos.	#	Name	Height	Weight	Year	Previous school	Hometown
G	2	Ryan Sabol	6 ft 3 in (1.91 m)	195 lb (88 kg)	Sr	Gonzaga College; Buffalo	Washington, D.C.
F	3	Javon Bardwell	6 ft 7 in (2.01 m)	198 lb (90 kg)	Fr	Overtime Elite RWE	Harlem, NY
F	4	Clyde Walters	6 ft 7 in (2.01 m)	190 lb (86 kg)	Fr	Overtime Elite RWE	Birmingham, AL
G	5	John Jackson	6 ft 0 in (1.83 m)	180 lb (82 kg)	RS Fr	Ridgewood	Ridgewood, NJ
F	7	Arrinten Page	6 ft 11 in (2.11 m)	245 lb (111 kg)	Sr	Wheeler; Northwestern	Atlanta, GA
G	9	Gavin Hightower	6 ft 1 in (1.85 m)	165 lb (75 kg)	So	Sierra Canyon; South Florida	Los Angeles, CA
G	10	Jacob Bannarbie	6 ft 9 in (2.06 m)	235 lb (107 kg)	RS Jr	Hillcrest Prep; UNLV	Anchorage, AK
F	11	Ryan Mela	6 ft 7 in (2.01 m)	205 lb (93 kg)	Jr	Newman School	Natick, MA
F	13	Leonardo Marangon	6 ft 7 in (2.01 m)	190 lb (86 kg)	Fr	Convitto Paolo Diacono	Vigodarzere, Italy
C	20	Samson Aletan	6 ft 10 in (2.08 m)	223 lb (101 kg)	GS	Lake Highlands; Yale	Dallas, TX
G	21	Miles Byrd	6 ft 6 in (1.98 m)	200 lb (91 kg)	GS	Lincoln; San Diego State	Stockton, CA
G	22	Devin Vanterpool	6 ft 4 in (1.93 m)	195 lb (88 kg)	RS Jr	Christ the King; Florida Atlantic	Laurel, MD
G	24	Malik Mack	6 ft 2 in (1.88 m)	175 lb (79 kg)	Sr	St. John's College; Georgetown	Oxon Hill, MD
F	45	Elijah Saunders	6 ft 8 in (2.03 m)	240 lb (109 kg)	GS	Sunnyslope; Maryland	Phoenix, AZ

Head coach

- Bryan Hodgson (Jamestown CC)

Assistant coach(es)

- Tee Butters (Clemson)
- Alex Harris (Fayetteville State)
- James Quarles (Augusta State)
- Derek Rongstad (UW–Whitewater)
- Logan Ingram (Alabama)

Legend

- (C) Team captain
- (S) Suspended
- (I) Ineligible
- (W) Walk-on
- Injured
- Current redshirt

Roster
Last update: November 17, 2026

== Schedule and results ==
Date time, TV	Rank^{#}	Opponent^{#}	Result	Record	High points	High rebounds	High assists	Site (attendance) city, state
Exhibition
October 17, 2026*; 2:00 p.m.		Pittsburgh	W 87–64		17 – Byrd	7 – Byrd	7 – Tied	Amica Mutual Pavilion (4,601); Providence, RI
October 24, 2026*; 12:00 p.m.		Georgia Tech	W 101–73		19 – Byrd	7 – Page	5 – Tied	Amica Mutual Pavilion (4,733); Providence, RI
Non-conference regular season
November 2, 2026*; 7:00 p.m., ESPN+		Maine	W 83–56	1–0	14 – Bannarbie	10 – Bannarbie	7 – Hightower	Amica Mutual Pavilion (11,685); Providence, RI
November 7, 2026*; 7:00 p.m., FS1		Nebraska; Basketball Hall of Fame Tip-Off	L 58–67	1–1	12 – Marangon	8 – Mela	4 – Tied	Mohegan Sun Arena (7,654); Uncasville, CT
November 10, 2026*; 7:00 p.m., ESPN+		Bryant	W 78–55	2–1	21 – Vanterpool	10 – Bannarbie	5 – Byrd	Amica Mutual Pavilion (10,221); Providence, RI
November 14, 2026*; 6:00 p.m., Peacock		Colorado	W 67–53	3–1	17 – Byrd	8 – Bannarbie	5 – Mack	Amica Mutual Pavilion (12,400); Providence, RI
November 17, 2026*; 7:00 p.m., ESPN+		Sacred Heart	W 86–67	4–1	18 – Byrd	7 – Page	6 – Byrd	Amica Mutual Pavilion (7,862); Providence, RI
*Non-conference game. ^{#}Rankings from AP Poll. (#) Tournament seedings in parentheses. All times are in Eastern Time.
