= Richard Pitino =

American basketball coach (born 1982)

- Pitino in 2026

Current position
- Title: Head coach
- Team: Xavier
- Conference: Big East
- Record: 20–19 (.513)

Biographical details
- Born: September 16, 1982 (age 44); Boston, Massachusetts, U.S.

Coaching career (HC unless noted)
- 2004–2005: Charleston (assistant)
- 2005–2006: Northeastern (assistant)
- 2006–2007: Duquesne (assistant)
- 2007–2009: Louisville (assistant)
- 2009–2011: Florida (assistant)
- 2011–2012: Louisville (associate HC)
- 2012–2013: FIU
- 2013–2021: Minnesota
- 2021–2025: New Mexico
- 2025–present: Xavier

Head coaching record
- Overall: 267–205 (.566)
- Tournaments: 2–4 (NCAA Division I); 5–1 (NIT)

Accomplishments and honors

Championships
- NIT (2014); MWC tournament (2024); MWC regular season (2025)

Awards
- Big Ten Coach of the Year (2017); MWC Coach of the Year (2025)

Richard William Pitino (born September 16, 1982) is an American college basketball coach who is the head men's basketball coach at Xavier University. He was previously head coach at Florida International from 2012 to 2013, Minnesota from 2013 to 2021, and New Mexico from 2021 to 2025.

== Early life and career ==
Pitino is the son of St. John's University men's basketball head coach Rick Pitino. After attending St. Sebastian's School in Needham, Massachusetts, Richard Pitino earned a Bachelor of Arts degree in history at Providence College in 2005. During his time at Providence, Pitino was the manager for the Friars men's basketball team under Tim Welsh. For two years, he also served as an assistant basketball coach for St. Andrew's School in nearby Barrington, Rhode Island.

== Assistant coaching career ==
In 2004–2005, he worked as an administrative assistant under Tom Herrion at the College of Charleston. In 2005, he was hired by coach Ron Everhart to serve as assistant coach at Northeastern University and followed Everhart to Duquesne University the following year. He was hired on at Louisville in October. In his first stint with the Cardinals, he helped them advance to back-to-back NCAA Elite Eight appearances.

He left the University of Louisville and accepted a position to work under Billy Donovan at the University of Florida on April 17, 2009. During his time at Florida, they advanced to two NCAA tournaments including one Elite Eight appearance in 2010.

He left Florida on April 12, 2011, to become the associate head coach at Louisville. In his second stint at the school he helped the Cardinals advance to the NCAA Final Four and finish with a 30–10 overall record.

== Head coaching career ==
=== Florida International ===
Pitino left his position as the associate head coach at Louisville to become the head coach at FIU on April 15, 2012, replacing Isiah Thomas. With only six players remaining from the previous season, and not all of them on scholarship, Pitino cobbled together a team and coached a high-pressure defense that finished eighth in the nation in steals. He was able to compile an 18–14 record (11–9 in the Sun Belt Conference) in his first season as head coach. This was FIU's first winning season since 1999–2000 and most wins overall since 1997–98. His FIU team also had the best conference record in school history. Additionally, FIU reached the Sun Belt tournament title game as a no. 4 seed, falling to Western Kentucky, 65–63.

=== Minnesota ===
On April 3, 2013, despite having only one year of head coaching experience at FIU, Pitino was hired to become the 17th head coach in University of Minnesota history, replacing Tubby Smith.

On April 1, 2014, in Pitino's first season at Minnesota, the Golden Gophers defeated Florida State University 67–64 in overtime in the NIT semifinals, breaking a school record with its 24th win of the season. On April 3, 2014, exactly one year to the date he was hired, Pitino won his first NIT Championship by defeating Larry Brown's SMU team 65–63, securing a school record 25th win. The win was the Gophers first NIT championship since 1998 - although that was vacated in 1999 - and their first "official" NIT title since 1993.

Following a historically bad third year at Minnesota, Pitino orchestrated a dramatic turnaround by improving the team's record by 16 wins in his fourth season, utilizing a revamped roster that included five new contributors. The team's success helped earn Pitino the Big Ten Coach of the Year award for 2016–17. This was just the second Big Ten coach of the year award in Minnesota school history, and Minnesota's first since 1982. That season Pitino guided the Gophers to an 11–7 record in the Big Ten, which was Minnesota's most wins in conference in 20 years.

On March 21, 2019, in the first round of the 2019 NCAA Division I men's basketball tournament, No. 10 Minnesota faced No. 7 seed Louisville, a school he previously helped coach and a program which his father Rick had been head coach of for 16 years. Minnesota defeated the Cardinals 86–76 to move on to the Round of 32. In the Round of 32, the Gophers lost 70–50 to 2nd-seeded Michigan State.

Pitino was fired as head coach after his eighth season by athletic director Mark Coyle, on March 15, 2021, after finishing the season 14–15, 6–14 in the conference. Minnesota was the only Big Ten team to be winless on the road, going 0–10 in the regular season.

=== New Mexico ===
==== 2021–22 ====
On March 17, 2021, less than 24 hours after he was fired by Minnesota, Pitino became the 22nd head coach in University of New Mexico program history. Coach Pitino immediately found success in recruiting by attacking the newly invigorated transfer portal. Coach Pitino brought future All-Mountain West performers Jaelen House (Arizona State) and Jamal Mashburn Jr. (Minnesota) to Albuquerque as foundational pieces. In total, Pitino brought nine incoming recruits to Albuquerque, hoping to improve upon the previous season's 6–16 record. UNM finished the year at 13–19 and 5–12 in conference play. However, UNM was highly competitive in the majority of their games and beat AP-ranked Wyoming, Pitino's first signature win in the Duke City.

==== 2022–23 ====
New Mexico raced out to a 14–0 start with signature wins vs. St. Mary's, Iona (coached by Pitino's father, Rick Pitino) and Oral Roberts, all NCAA tournament teams. The Lobos had three all-league performers in Mashburn, House and newcomer Morris Udeze (Wichita State transfer). Pitino also had promising freshman Donovan Dent coming off the bench for key minutes throughout the year. The Lobos beat national runner-up San Diego State on the road and also defeated NCAA tournament-team Boise State during conference play. UNM lost seven of their final nine conference games and finished 22–12 overall and 8–10 in Mountain West play, earning an NIT appearance.

==== 2023–24 ====
In Pitino's third year, the Lobos had a NET ranking of 22 by the end of the regular season. New Mexico won the Mountain West tournament in Las Vegas and returned to the NCAA tournament after a ten-year absence. New Mexico had five players selected for Mountain West Conference honors: Donovan Dent, JT Toppin, and Jaelen House were named second-team All-Mountain West, and Mashburn was named to the third team. Mustapha Amzil was Co-Sixth Man of the Year and Toppin was Co-Freshman of the Year. The Lobos finished 26–10 and lost in the first round of the NCAA tournament to the Clemson Tigers.

=== Xavier ===
On March 25, 2025, he accepted the head coach position at Xavier University.

== Head coaching record ==
Record table
Season	Team	Overall	Conference	Standing	Postseason
FIU Panthers (Sun Belt Conference) (2012–2013)
2012–13	FIU	18–14	11–9	5th (East)	
FIU:		18–14 (.563)	11–9 (.550)		
Minnesota Golden Gophers (Big Ten Conference) (2013–2021)
2013–14	Minnesota	25–13	8–10	7th	NIT Champion
2014–15	Minnesota	18–15	6–12	T–10th	
2015–16	Minnesota	8–23	2–16	13th	
2016–17	Minnesota	24–10	11–7	4th	NCAA Division I Round of 64
2017–18	Minnesota	15–17	4–14	T–11th	
2018–19	Minnesota	22–14	9–11	7th	NCAA Division I Round of 32
2019–20	Minnesota	15–16	8–12	12th	
2020–21	Minnesota	14–15	6–14	13th	
Minnesota:		141–123 (.534)	54–96 (.360)		
New Mexico Lobos (Mountain West Conference) (2021–2025)
2021–22	New Mexico	13–19	5–12	10th	
2022–23	New Mexico	22–12	8–10	6th	NIT First Round
2023–24	New Mexico	26–10	10–8	T–6th	NCAA Division I Round of 64
2024–25	New Mexico	27–8	17–3	1st	NCAA Division I Round of 32
New Mexico:		88–49 (.642)	40–33 (.548)		
Xavier Musketeers (Big East Conference) (2025–present)
2025–26	Xavier	15–18	6–14	T–10th	
2026–27	Xavier	5–1	0–0		
Xavier:		20–19 (.513)	6–14 (.300)		
Total:		267–205 (.566)			
National champion Postseason invitational champion Conference regular season champion Conference regular season and conference tournament champion Division regular season champion Division regular season and conference tournament champion Conference tournament champion
