= Rubén Domínguez =

Rubén Domínguez may refer to:

- Rubén Domínguez (tenor) (1935–2015), Venezuelan tenor
- Rubén Domínguez (footballer) (born 1987), Spanish football manager and former footballer
- Rubén Domínguez (basketball) (born 2003), Spanish basketball player
