= Bahamas Championship =

College basketball competition

- Sport: College basketball
- Founded: 2021
- Owner: bdG Sports
- No. of teams: 4
- Country: The Bahamas
- Venues: Baha Mar Convention Center, Nassau, Bahamas
- Most recent champion: Seton Hall
- Broadcaster: CBS Sports Network
- Related competitions: Nassau Championship
- Website: Bahamar Hoops

The Bahamas Championship is a preseason college basketball tournament, first held in 2021.

== Champions ==
Year	School
2021	Louisville
2022	UCF
2023	Miami (FL)
2024	Tennessee
2025	Purdue

== Brackets ==
* – Denotes overtime period

=== 2026 ===
Semifinals; November 19; CBSSN
NC State	93
Murray State	83
Wisconsin	69
Seton Hall	74

Championship; November 20; CBSSN
NC State	81
Seton Hall	87*
3rd place Game; November 20; CBSSN
Wisconsin	56
Murray State	70

=== 2025 ===
Semifinals; November 20; CBSSN
1	Purdue	80
Memphis	71
15	Texas Tech	84
Wake Forest	83

Championship; November 21; CBSSN
1	Purdue	86
15	Texas Tech	56
3rd place Game; November 21; CBSSN
Memphis	68
Wake Forest	69

=== 2024 ===
Semifinals; November 21; CBSSN
13	Baylor	99^{**}
22	St. John's	98
11	Tennessee	64
Virginia	42

Championship; November 22; CBSSN
13	Baylor	62
11	Tennessee	77
3rd place Game; November 22; CBSSN
22	St. John's	80
Virginia	55

=== 2023 ===
The 2023 field featured the following teams:

Semifinals; November 17; CBSSN
12	Miami (FL)	79
Georgia	68
Kansas State	73*
Providence	70

Championship; November 19; CBSSN
12	Miami (FL)	91
Kansas State	83
Consolation; November 19; CBSSN
Georgia	64
Providence	71

=== 2022 ===
Semifinals; November 18; CBSSN
DePaul	61
Santa Clara	69
Oklahoma State	56
UCF	60

Championship; November 20; CBSSN
Santa Clara	50
UCF	57
Consolation; November 20; CBSSN
DePaul	78
Oklahoma State	82

=== 2021 ===
Semifinals; November 25; CBSSN
Maryland	86
Richmond	80
Louisville	72
Mississippi State	58

Championship; November 27; CBSSN
Maryland	55
Louisville	63
Consolation; November 27; FloHoops
Richmond	71
Mississippi State	82*
