= Colben Landrew =

American basketball player (born 2008)

- Landrew in 2026

No. 3 – UConn Huskies
- Position: Small forward
- Conference: Big East Conference

Personal information
- Born: February 27, 2008 (age 18)
- Listed height: 6 ft 5 in (1.96 m)
- Listed weight: 210 lb (95 kg)

Career information
- High school: Thompson (Alabaster, Alabama); Wheeler (Cobb County, Georgia)
- College: UConn (2026−present)

Career highlights
- Mr. Georgia Basketball (2026)
Medals
Men's basketball
Representing United States
FIBA Under-18 AmeriCup
Silver medal – second place	2026 Mexico	Team

Colben Isaiah Landrew (born February 27, 2008) is an American college basketball player for the UConn Huskies of the Big East Conference. Coming out of high school, he was regarded as a consensus four-star recruit.

== Early life ==
Colben Isaiah Landrew was born on February 27, 2008, to Stacey and Tremaine Landrew.

== High school career ==
Landrew initially attended Thompson High School, where he played football and basketball. He earned ASWA all-state honorable mention at wide receiver after he had 28 receptions for 568 yards and 13 touchdowns as a sophomore before switching to basketball full-time.

Following his sophomore year, Landrew transferred to Wheeler High School in Cobb County, Georgia. As a junior, he averaged 18 points, 6.5 rebounds, and 3.8 assists per game and led his team to the GHSA Class 6A state championship, earning MaxPreps All-American honorable mention. That summer, Landrew played with Game Elite at the Adidas 3SSB Palmetto Road Championship, averaging 15.1 points, 5.8 rebounds, 2.6 assists and 1.5 steals per game. As a senior, Landrew averaged 24.9 points, 6.8 rebounds and 3.2 assists per game and won a second state championship. He was named a MaxPreps All-American, USA Today All-USA High School Basketball Third Team All-American, Georgia Gatorade Player of the Year, Georgia MaxPreps Player of the Year, Mr. Georgia Basketball, and the Georgia Basketball Coaches Association Class 6A North Player of the Year.

Landrew was rated as a consensus four-star recruit and was ranked as a consensus top-35 prospect nationally in the class of 2027. On October 15, 2025, Landrew committed to play college basketball at the University of Connecticut for the UConn Huskies.

== College career ==
Prior to the start of the season, Landrew appeared in all three exhibiton games for the UConn Huskies, averaging 12 points on 51% shooting. Landrew was also named to the preseason watch list for the Julius Erving Award. The Huskies made their season debut on November 2, 2026, against the Garden-Webb Runnin' Bulldogs, where the Huskies won 86-46, with Landrew scoring 11 points in his debut.

== National team career ==
In May 2026, Landrew received a camp invite to participate with the USA Basketball U-18 team. He was later selected to represent Team USA at the 2026 FIBA U18 AmeriCup in León, Mexico. Landrew helped lead the team to the championship game, where they lost to Canada 67−65. In five games, Landrew averaged 11.6 points, 4.6 rebounds, and 1.4 assists, and won a silver medal.
