= Na'jai Hines =

American basketball player (born 2007)

No. 9 – UConn Huskies
- Position: Center
- Conference: Big East Conference

Personal information
- Born: March 27, 2007 (age 19)
- Listed height: 6 ft 11 in (2.11 m)
- Listed weight: 278 lb (126 kg)

Career information
- High school: Plainfield (Plainfield, New Jersey)
- College: Seton Hall (2025–2026); UConn (2026–present)

Na'jai Hines (born March 27, 2007) is an American college basketball player for the UConn Huskies of the Big East Conference. He previously played for the Seton Hall Pirates.

== Early life ==
Hines attended Plainfield High School in Union County, New Jersey. During his senior season, he averaged 18.6 points and 16.9 rebounds per game. Coming out of high school, Hines was rated as a four-star recruit, the 8th overall center, and the top player in the state of New Jersey by 247Sports. Ultimately, he committed to play college basketball for the Seton Hall Pirates.

== College career ==
=== Seton Hall ===
On November 3, 2025, Hines totaled 12 points, nine rebounds, and six blocks in a win over Saint Peter's. On January 13, 2026, he recorded 10 points, seven rebounds, and three blocks in a loss against UConn. On February 28, Hines dropped 11 points and 11 rebounds in another loss to UConn. He finished his freshman season averaging 6.5 points, 5.5 rebounds, and 2.2 blocks in 18 minutes per game. After the season, Hines entered the NCAA transfer portal.

=== UConn ===
Hines transferred to play for the UConn Huskies.
