= 2026–27 Illinois Fighting Illini men's basketball team =

American college basketball season

2026–27 Illinois Fighting Illini men's basketball
- Conference: Big Ten Conference

Ranking
- Coaches: No. 8
- AP: No. 10
- Record: 5–1 (0–0 Big Ten)
- Head coach: Brad Underwood (10th season)
- Associate head coach: Orlando Antigua (7th overall, 3rd season)
- Assistant coaches: Geoff Alexander (6th season); Zach Hamer (4th season); Tyler Underwood (4th season); Camryn Crocker (2nd season)
- Home arena: State Farm Center

2026–27 Big Ten Conference men's basketball standings
	Conf.				Overall
Team	W		L	PCT	W		L	PCT
Indiana	0	–	0	–	6	–	0	1.000
Minnesota	0	–	0	–	6	–	0	1.000
No. 24 Nebraska	0	–	0	–	5	–	0	1.000
No. 7 UCLA	0	–	0	–	5	–	0	1.000
No. 18т USC	0	–	0	–	5	–	0	1.000
Washington	0	–	0	–	4	–	0	1.000
No. 10 Illinois	0	–	0	–	5	–	1	.833
Penn State	0	–	0	–	5	–	1	.833
No. 2 Michigan State	0	–	0	–	4	–	1	.800
No. 18т Michigan	0	–	0	–	3	–	1	.750
Oregon	0	–	0	–	3	–	1	.750
Ohio State	0	–	0	–	4	–	2	.667
Purdue	0	–	0	–	4	–	2	.667
Rutgers	0	–	0	–	4	–	2	.667
Wisconsin	0	–	0	–	4	–	2	.667
Iowa	0	–	0	–	3	–	2	.600
Maryland	0	–	0	–	3	–	2	.600
Northwestern	0	–	0	–	3	–	3	.500
† 2027 Big Ten tournament winner As of November 21, 2026; Rankings from AP poll

The 2026–27 Illinois Fighting Illini men's basketball team represent the University of Illinois during the 2026–27 NCAA Division I men's basketball season. The Illini are led by tenth-year head coach Brad Underwood. The Illini play their home games at the State Farm Center in Champaign, Illinois, as members of the Big Ten Conference.

== Previous season ==
The Fighting Illini finished the 2025–26 season 28–9 and 15–5 in Big Ten play. As the No. 3 seed in the Big Ten tournament, they were upset in the quarterfinals by Wisconsin. As an at–large bid to the NCAA tournament, they were the No. 3 seed in the West region. There, they defeated Penn, VCU, Houston and rival Iowa en route to the team's sixth Final Four in program history and first since 2005. However, they were defeated by UConn, denying them an appearance in the National Championship game.

== Offseason ==
The Illini were predicted to win the Big Ten Conference in the preseason media poll conducted by The Columbus Dispatch.

=== Departures ===
Illinois departures
Name	Number	Pos.	Height	Weight	Year	Hometown	Reason for departure
Brandon Lee	1	G	6'4"	195	Freshman	San Juan, Puerto Rico	Transferred to James Madison
Ben Humrichous	3	F	6'9"	235	Graduate Student	Tipton, IN	Graduated
Kylan Boswell	4	G	6'2"	215	Senior	Champaign, IL	Graduated
AJ Redd	5	G	6'3"	170	Senior	Chicago, IL	Walk-on; Graduated
Toni Bilić	9	F	6'8"	210	(redshirt) Sophomore	Trogir, Croatia	Transferred
Ty Rodgers	20	G/F	6'6"	210	(redshirt) Sophomore	Saginaw, MI	Transferred to Boise State
Keaton Wagler	23	G	6'6"	185	Freshman	Shawnee, KS	Declared for the 2026 NBA draft; Selected 5th overall by Los Angeles Clippers
Mihailo Petrović	77	G	6'2"	180	Sophomore	Prokuplje, Serbia	Transferred to Seton Hall

=== Incoming transfers ===
Illinois incoming transfers
Name	Number	Pos.	Height	Weight	Year	Hometown	Previous school
Quentin McCoy	5	G	6'1"	195	Junior	Chicago, Illinois	Arizona State
Stefan Vaaks	7	G	6'7"	215	Sophomore	Tabasalu, Estonia	Providence

=== Recruiting class ===
==== 2026 recruiting class ====
College recruiting
Name	Hometown	School	Height	Weight	Commit date
Quentin Coleman; SG	St. Louis, Missouri	The Principia	6 ft 4 in (1.93 m)	180 lb (82 kg)	Apr 3, 2026
Quentin Coleman; SG	Recruit ratings: Rivals: 247Sports: On3: ESPN: (89)				
Lucas Morillo; SF	Santo Domingo, Dominican Republic	The Newman School	6 ft 6 in (1.98 m)	200 lb (91 kg)	Oct 24, 2025
Lucas Morillo; SF	Recruit ratings: Rivals: 247Sports: On3: ESPN: (87)				
Zavier Zens; SF	Milwaukee, Wisconsin	Wisconsin Lutheran High School	6 ft 7 in (2.01 m)	215 lb (98 kg)	Apr 17, 2026
Zavier Zens; SF	Recruit ratings: Rivals: 247Sports: On3: ESPN: (79)				
Ethan Brown; SG	Rolla, Missouri	Rolla High School	6 ft 4 in (1.93 m)	175 lb (79 kg)	Jul 30, 2025
Ethan Brown; SG	Recruit ratings: Rivals: 247Sports: On3: ESPN: (79)				
Landon Davis; PF	Waukee, Iowa	Waukee Northwest High School	6 ft 8 in (2.03 m)	210 lb (95 kg)	Nov 12, 2025
Landon Davis; PF	Recruit ratings: Rivals: 247Sports: On3: ESPN: (79)				
Lincoln Williams; SF	Kankakee, Illinois	Kankakee High School	6 ft 5 in (1.96 m)	180 lb (82 kg)	Jun 8, 2026
Lincoln Williams; SF	Recruit ratings: Rivals: 247Sports: On3: ESPN: (81)				
Overall recruit ranking: Rivals: 15 247Sports: 12 On3: 14 ESPN: 21
Note: In many cases, Scout, Rivals, 247Sports, On3, and ESPN may conflict in their listings of height and weight.; In these cases, the average was taken. ESPN grades are on a 100-point scale.; Sources: "2026 Illinois Commits". Rivals.; "ESPN- Illinois Fighting Illini Men's Basketball Recruiting". ESPN.; "2026 Team Ranking". Rivals.; "2026–27 Illinois Fighting Illini men's basketball team". 247Sports.; "2026–27 Illinois Fighting Illini men's basketball team". On3.

== Roster ==
2026–27 Illinois Fighting Illini men's basketball team
Players
Coaches

Pos.	#	Name	Height	Weight	Year	Previous school	Hometown
F	0	David Mirković (injured)	6 ft 9 in (2.06 m)	250 lb (113 kg)	So	KK Studentski centar	Nikšić, Montenegro
G	1	Lincoln Williams	6 ft 5 in (1.96 m)	180 lb (82 kg)	Fr	Kankakee High School	Kankakee, Illinois
G	2	Andrej Stojaković	6 ft 7 in (2.01 m)	205 lb (93 kg)	Sr	California	Thessaloniki, Greece
G	5	Quentin McCoy	6 ft 1 in (1.85 m)	170 lb (77 kg)	Jr	Arizona State	Chicago, Illinois
G	7	Stefan Vaaks	6 ft 7 in (2.01 m)	215 lb (98 kg)	So	Providence	Tabasalu, Estonia
G	8	Blake Fagbemi	6 ft 0 in (1.83 m)	180 lb (82 kg)	So	Benet Academy	Naperville, Illinois
G	11	Quentin Coleman	6 ft 4 in (1.93 m)	180 lb (82 kg)	Fr	The Principia	St. Louis, Missouri
C	13	Tomislav Ivišić	7 ft 1 in (2.16 m)	270 lb (122 kg)	Sr	KK Studentski centar	Vodice, Croatia
F	15	Jake Davis (injured)	6 ft 6 in (1.98 m)	210 lb (95 kg)	Sr	Mercer	McCordsville, Indiana
F	22	Zavier Zens	6 ft 7 in (2.01 m)	215 lb (98 kg)	Fr	Wisconsin Lutheran High School	Milwaukee, Wisconsin
G	23	Lucas Morillo	6 ft 7 in (2.01 m)	210 lb (95 kg)	Fr	The Newman School	Santo Domingo, Dominican Republic
F	27	Landon Davis	6 ft 9 in (2.06 m)	220 lb (100 kg)	Fr	Waukee Northwest High School	Waukee, Iowa
C	31	Jason Jakstys	6 ft 10 in (2.08 m)	220 lb (100 kg)	RS So	Yorkville HS	Yorkville, Illinois
G	34	Ethan Brown	6 ft 4 in (1.93 m)	185 lb (84 kg)	Fr	Rolla High School	Rolla, Missouri
F/C	44	Zvonimir Ivišić	7 ft 2 in (2.18 m)	250 lb (113 kg)	Sr	Arkansas	Vodice, Croatia

Head coach

- Brad Underwood (Kansas State)

Assistant coach(es)

- Orlando Antigua (Pittsburgh)
- Geoff Alexander (Western Illinois)
- Tyler Underwood (Illinois)
- Camryn Crocker (Penn)
- Zach Hamer (Vanderbilt)

Legend

- (C) Team captain
- (S) Suspended
- (I) Ineligible
- (W) Walk-on
- Injured
- Current redshirt

Roster
Last update: 11/1/26

== Schedule and results ==
Date time, TV	Rank^{#}	Opponent^{#}	Result	Record	High points	High rebounds	High assists	Site (attendance) city, state
Exhibition
October 17, 2026*; 4:00 p.m.		at Cincinnati	W 105–96		24 – Stojaković	7 – Coleman	8 – Coleman	Fifth Third Arena (6,347); Cincinnati, OH
October 23, 2026*; 7:00 p.m., B1G+	No. 3	Baylor	L 91–95		20 – Coleman	7 – Coleman	5 – Vaaks	State Farm Center (15,544); Champaign, IL
October 28, 2026*; 7:00 p.m., B1G+	No. 3	UIC	W 101–66		14 – T. Ivišić	8 – Morillo	5 – Tied	State Farm Center (14,625); Champaign, IL
Regular season
November 2, 2026*; 7:00 p.m., BTN	No. 3	Fairleigh Dickinson	W 120–45	1–0	20 – Tied	10 – Coleman	7 – Brown	State Farm Center (14,555); Champaign, IL
November 5, 2026*; 7:30 p.m., FS1	No. 3	Penn	W 112–70	2–0	25 – Stojaković	10 – Brown	7 – T. Ivišić	State Farm Center (15,046); Champaign, IL
November 10, 2026*; 7:00 p.m., Peacock / NBCSN	No. 3	at No. 16 Texas Tech	L 78–84	2–1	19 – Coleman	6 – T. Ivišić	4 – Coleman	United Supermarkets Arena (15,098); Lubbock, TX
November 13, 2026*; 6:00 p.m., B1G+	No. 3	Sam Houston	W 108–86	3–1	28 – T. Ivišić	8 – Coleman	7 – Brown	State Farm Center (15,544); Champaign, IL
November 17, 2026*; 6:00 p.m., ESPN	No. 10	at No. 5 Duke	W 99–78	4–1	46 – Stojaković	8 – Tied	4 – Coleman	Cameron Indoor Stadium (9,314); Durham, NC
November 20, 2026*; 8:00 p.m., BTN	No. 10	Eastern Illinois	W 114–52	5–1	26 – Brown	11 – Vaaks	9 – Vaaks	State Farm Center (15,544); Champaign, IL
November 23, 2026*; 7:00 p.m., BTN		Winthrop						State Farm Center; Champaign, IL
November 27, 2026*; 5:00 p.m., FS1		Western Kentucky						State Farm Center; Champaign, IL
December 4, 2026*; 6:00 p.m., FOX		vs. UConn						United Center; Chicago, IL
December 8, 2026; 6:00 p.m., Peacock / NBCSN		at Minnesota						Williams Arena; Minneapolis, MN
December 12, 2026; 1:00 p.m., FS1		Penn State						State Farm Center; Champaign, IL
December 20, 2026*; 6:30 p.m., ESPN2		vs. Missouri; Braggin' Rights						Enterprise Center; St. Louis, MO
December 29, 2026*; 6:00 p.m., B1G+		Seattle						State Farm Center; Champaign, IL
January 2, 2027; 8:00 p.m., FOX		at Wisconsin						Kohl Center; Madison, WI
January 5, 2027; 8:00 p.m., Peacock / NBCSN		Purdue						State Farm Center; Champaign, IL
January 9, 2027; 3:00 p.m., CBS		Ohio State						State Farm Center; Champaign, IL
January 13, 2027; 8:00 p.m., BTN		at Northwestern; Rivalry						Welsh–Ryan Arena; Evanston, IL
January 16, 2027; 1:00 p.m., Peacock / NBCSN		at Maryland						Xfinity Center; College Park, MD
January 19, 2027; 8:00 p.m., Peacock / NBCSN		Nebraska						State Farm Center; Champaign, IL
January 24, 2027; 11:00 a.m., CBS		at Indiana; Rivalry						Simon Skjodt Assembly Hall; Bloomington, IN
January 27, 2027; 8:00 p.m., BTN		USC						State Farm Center; Champaign, IL
January 30, 2027*; 5:00 p.m./5:30 p.m., ESPN/ESPN2		vs. North Carolina; Nashville Hoops Showdown						Bridgestone Arena; Nashville, TN
February 2, 2027; 8:00 p.m., Peacock / NBCSN		UCLA						State Farm Center; Champaign, IL
February 5, 2027; 7:00 p.m., FOX		Michigan State						State Farm Center; Champaign, IL
February 9, 2027; 6:00 p.m., Peacock / NBCSN		at Michigan						Crisler Center; Ann Arbor, MI
February 12, 2027; 7:00 p.m., FOX		at Purdue						Mackey Arena; West Lafayette, IN
February 16, 2027; 8:00 p.m., BTN		Northwestern; Rivalry						State Farm Center; Champaign, IL
February 20, 2027; 4:00 p.m., FOX		at Oregon						Matthew Knight Arena; Eugene, OR
February 23, 2027; 9:00 p.m., FS1		at Washington						Alaskan Airlines Arena; Seattle, WA
February 28, 2027; 12:30 p.m., CBS		Wisconsin						State Farm Center; Champaign, IL
March 3, 2027; 5:30 p.m., BTN		at Rutgers						Jersey Mike's Arena; Piscataway, NJ
March 6, 2027; 7:00 p.m., FOX		Iowa; Rivalry						State Farm Center; Champaign, IL
*Non-conference game. ^{#}Rankings from AP Poll. (#) Tournament seedings in parentheses. All times are in Central Time.

== Rankings ==
Ranking movements Legend: ██ Increase in ranking ██ Decrease in ranking ( ) = First-place votes
	Week																				
Poll	Pre	1	2	3	4	5	6	7	8	9	10	11	12	13	14	15	16	17	18	19	Final
AP	3 (2)	3	10																		
Coaches	3 (2)	3 (1)	8																		
