= 2025–26 Illinois Fighting Illini men's basketball team =

American college basketball season

2025–26 Illinois Fighting Illini men's basketball

NCAA tournament, Final Four
- Conference: Big Ten Conference

Ranking
- Coaches: No. 5
- AP: No. 5
- Record: 28–9 (15–5 Big Ten)
- Head coach: Brad Underwood (9th season)
- Associate head coach: Orlando Antigua (2nd, 6th overall season)
- Assistant coaches: Geoff Alexander (5th season); Tyler Underwood (3rd season); Camryn Crocker (1st season); Zach Hamer (3rd season)
- Home arena: State Farm Center

2025–26 Big Ten Conference men's basketball standings
	Conf.				Overall
Team	W		L	PCT	W		L	PCT
No. 1 Michigan	19	–	1	.950	37	–	3	.925
No. 14 Nebraska	15	–	5	.750	28	–	7	.800
No. 5 Illinois	15	–	5	.750	28	–	9	.757
No. 11 Michigan State	15	–	5	.750	27	–	8	.771
No. 25 Wisconsin	14	–	6	.700	24	–	11	.686
No. 6 Purdue †	13	–	7	.650	30	–	9	.769
UCLA	13	–	7	.650	24	–	12	.667
Ohio State	12	–	8	.600	21	–	13	.618
No. 15 Iowa	10	–	10	.500	24	–	13	.649
Indiana	9	–	11	.450	18	–	14	.563
Minnesota	8	–	12	.400	15	–	18	.455
USC	7	–	13	.350	18	–	14	.563
Washington	7	–	13	.350	16	–	17	.485
Rutgers	6	–	14	.300	14	–	20	.412
Northwestern	5	–	15	.250	15	–	19	.441
Oregon	5	–	15	.250	12	–	20	.375
Maryland	4	–	16	.200	12	–	21	.364
Penn State	3	–	17	.150	12	–	20	.375
† 2026 Big Ten tournament winner Rankings from AP poll

The 2025–26 Illinois Fighting Illini men's basketball team represented the University of Illinois during the 2025–26 NCAA Division I men's basketball season. The Illini, led by ninth-year head coach Brad Underwood, played their home games at the State Farm Center in Champaign, Illinois as members of the Big Ten Conference.

== Previous season ==
The Fighting Illini finished the 2024–25 season 12–8 in Big Ten play to finish in seventh place. They defeated Iowa before losing to Maryland in the Big Ten tournament. They then got assigned the #6 seed in the Midwest region in the NCAA tournament. They beat Xavier before losing to Kentucky in the second round.

== Offseason ==
In May 2025, it was reported that the team would be hiring Camryn Crocker as assistant coach to replace Tim Anderson, who had left prior to the previous season and whose spot was temporarily filled by Kwa Jones. On June 16, Coach Underwood informed the media that Ty Rodgers had sustained a serious knee injury during a pick-up game in his hometown that would require surgery. Rodgers underwent a successful surgery the following month.

On July 9, the team announced the hiring of Kevin Kruger as Assistant to the Head Coach.

In September, it was reported that Andrej Stojaković had been sidelined with a sprained knee. The following month, Tomislav Ivišić underwent a tonsillectomy and Mihailo Petrović sustained ankle and hamstring injuries, leading to both players missing the Illini's exhibition against Illinois State.

=== Departures ===
Illinois departures
Name	Number	Pos.	Height	Weight	Year	Hometown	Reason for departure
Carey Booth	0	F	6'10"	215	Sophomore	Englewood, CO	Transferred to Colorado State
Dra Gibbs-Lawhorn	2	G	6'1"	185	Sophomore	Lafayette, IN	Transferred to UNLV
Will Riley	7	F	6'8"	195	Freshman	Kitchener, Ontario	Declared for 2025 NBA draft; selected 21st overall by Utah Jazz, traded to Washington Wizards
Morez Johnson Jr.	21	F	6'9"	255	Freshman	Riverdale, IL	Transferred to Michigan
Tre White	22	G	6'7"	210	Junior	Dallas, TX	Transferred to Kansas
Keaton Kutcher	24	G	6'2"	195	RS Junior	Mount Vernon, IA	Walk-on; graduated
Kasparas Jakučionis	32	G	6'6"	205	Freshman	Vilnius, Lithuania	Declared for 2025 NBA draft; selected 20th overall by Miami Heat

=== Incoming transfers ===
Illinois incoming transfers
Name	Number	Pos.	Height	Weight	Year	Hometown	Previous school
Andrej Stojaković	2	G	6'7"	215	Junior	Thessaloniki, Greece	California
Zvonimir Ivišić	44	C	7'2"	250	Junior	Vodice, Croatia	Arkansas

=== 2025 recruiting class ===
College recruiting
Name	Hometown	School	Height	Weight	Commit date
Keaton Wagler; G	Shawnee, Kansas	Shawnee Mission Northwest	6 ft 6 in (1.98 m)	180 lb (82 kg)	Sep 18, 2024
Keaton Wagler; G	Recruit ratings: Rivals: 247Sports: On3: ESPN:				
Brandon Lee; G	San Juan, Puerto Rico	The Patrick School	6 ft 4 in (1.93 m)	180 lb (82 kg)	Sep 25, 2024
Brandon Lee; G	Recruit ratings: Rivals: 247Sports: On3: ESPN:				
David Mirković; F	Niksic, Montenegro	SC Derby	6 ft 9 in (2.06 m)	255 lb (116 kg)	Apr 7, 2025
David Mirković; F	Recruit ratings: 247Sports:				
Mihailo Petrović; G	Prokuplje, Serbia	KK Mega Basket	6 ft 3 in (1.91 m)	180 lb (82 kg)	Apr 22, 2025
Mihailo Petrović; G	Recruit ratings: 247Sports:				
Blake Fagbemi; G	Naperville, Illinois	Benet Academy	6 ft 0 in (1.83 m)	160 lb (73 kg)	May 7, 2025
Blake Fagbemi; G	Recruit ratings: No ratings found				
Toni Bilić; F	Trogir, Croatia	KK Cedevita Junior	6 ft 8 in (2.03 m)	210 lb (95 kg)	Dec 16, 2025
Toni Bilić; F	Recruit ratings: No ratings found				
Overall recruit ranking: Rivals: 58 247Sports: 45 On3: 63
Note: In many cases, Scout, Rivals, 247Sports, On3, and ESPN may conflict in their listings of height and weight.; In these cases, the average was taken. ESPN grades are on a 100-point scale.; Sources: "2025 Illinois Commits". Rivals.; "ESPN- Illinois Fighting Illini Men's Basketball Recruiting". ESPN.; "2025 Team Ranking". Rivals.; "2025–26 Illinois Fighting Illini men's basketball team". 247Sports.; "2025–26 Illinois Fighting Illini men's basketball team". On3.

== Roster ==
2025–26 Illinois Fighting Illini men's basketball team
Players
Coaches

Pos.	#	Name	Height	Weight	Year	Previous school	Hometown
F	0	David Mirković	6 ft 9 in (2.06 m)	250 lb (113 kg)	Fr	KK Studentski centar	Nikšić, Montenegro
G	1	Brandon Lee	6 ft 4 in (1.93 m)	195 lb (88 kg)	Fr	The Patrick School	San Juan, Puerto Rico
G	2	Andrej Stojaković	6 ft 7 in (2.01 m)	215 lb (98 kg)	Jr	California	Thessaloniki, Greece
F	3	Ben Humrichous	6 ft 9 in (2.06 m)	235 lb (107 kg)	GS	Evansville	Tipton, IN
G	4	Kylan Boswell	6 ft 2 in (1.88 m)	215 lb (98 kg)	Sr	Arizona	Champaign, IL
G	5	AJ Redd (W)	6 ft 3 in (1.91 m)	170 lb (77 kg)	Sr	St. Ignatius College Prep	Chicago, IL
G	8	Blake Fagbemi (W)	6 ft 0 in (1.83 m)	180 lb (82 kg)	Fr	Benet Academy	Naperville, IL
F	9	Toni Bilić (redshirt)	6 ft 8 in (2.03 m)	210 lb (95 kg)	So	KK Cedevita Junior Zagreb	Trogir, Croatia
C	13	Tomislav Ivišić	7 ft 1 in (2.16 m)	255 lb (116 kg)	Jr	KK Studentski centar	Vodice, Croatia
F	15	Jake Davis	6 ft 6 in (1.98 m)	215 lb (98 kg)	Jr	Mercer	McCordsville, IN
G/F	20	Ty Rodgers (injured)	6 ft 6 in (1.98 m)	210 lb (95 kg)	RS Jr	Thornton Township HS	Saginaw, MI
G	23	Keaton Wagler	6 ft 6 in (1.98 m)	185 lb (84 kg)	Fr	Shawnee Mission Northwest HS	Shawnee, KS
C	31	Jason Jakstys (injured)	6 ft 10 in (2.08 m)	225 lb (102 kg)	RS Fr	Yorkville HS	Yorkville, IL
F/C	44	Zvonimir Ivišić	7 ft 2 in (2.18 m)	250 lb (113 kg)	Jr	Arkansas	Vodice, Croatia
G	77	Mihailo Petrović	6 ft 2 in (1.88 m)	180 lb (82 kg)	So	KK Mega Basket	Prokuplje, Serbia

Head coach

- Brad Underwood (Kansas State)

Assistant coach(es)

- Orlando Antigua (Pittsburgh)
- Geoff Alexander (Western Illinois)
- Tyler Underwood (Illinois)
- Camryn Crocker (Penn)
- Zach Hamer (Vanderbilt)

Legend

- (C) Team captain
- (S) Suspended
- (I) Ineligible
- (W) Walk-on
- Injured
- Current redshirt

Roster
Last update: 4/12/26

Note: Mihailo Petrović, despite being a freshman, was awarded three years of eligibility. Thus he is listed as a sophomore for eligibility purposes. The same applies to Toni Bilić.

=== Roster movement ===
- Rodgers started the season out indefinitely and ultimately did not play.
- Toni Bilić joined the team for the spring semester.
- Kylan Boswell broke his hand in practice and missed a month.
- Jason Jakstys suffered a blood clot and was ruled out for the remainder of the season.

== Schedule and results ==
Date time, TV	Rank^{#}	Opponent^{#}	Result	Record	High points	High rebounds	High assists	Site (attendance) city, state
Exhibition
October 19, 2025*; 2:00 p.m., B1G+	No. 17	Illinois State	W 92–65		19 – Mirković	14 – Mirković	6 – Tied	State Farm Center (15,180); Champaign, IL
Regular season
November 3, 2025*; 7:30 p.m., BTN	No. 17	Jackson State	W 113–55	1–0	21 – Tied	14 – Mirković	5 – Boswell	State Farm Center (14,511); Champaign, IL
November 7, 2025*; 7:30 p.m., Peacock	No. 17	Florida Gulf Coast	W 113–70	2–0	31 – Boswell	11 – Mirković	3 – Tied	State Farm Center (15,544); Champaign, IL
November 11, 2025*; 7:30 p.m., FS1	No. 14	No. 11 Texas Tech	W 81–77	3–0	23 – Stojaković	7 – Tied	3 – Boswell	State Farm Center (15,544); Champaign, IL
November 14, 2025*; 7:30 p.m., B1G+	No. 14	Colgate	W 84–65	4–0	27 – Mirković	21 – Mirković	4 – Boswell	State Farm Center (15,544); Champaign, IL
November 19, 2025*; 8:00 p.m., FS1	No. 8	vs. No. 11 Alabama	L 86–90	4–1	26 – Stojaković	10 – Mirković	7 – Boswell	United Center (17,775); Chicago, IL
November 22, 2025*; 1:00 p.m., B1G+	No. 8	LIU; Illinois Showcase	W 98–58	5–1	20 – Stojaković	8 – Mirković	3 – Tied	State Farm Center (12,625); Champaign, IL
November 24, 2025*; 7:00 p.m., BTN	No. 13	UT Rio Grande Valley; Illinois Showcase	W 87–73	6–1	24 – Stojaković	8 – Wagler	5 – Mirković	State Farm Center (11,853); Champaign, IL
November 28, 2025*; 11:30 a.m., FOX	No. 13	vs. No. 5 UConn; SentinelOne Showdown	L 61–74	6–2	25 – Boswell	10 – T. Ivišić	3 – Boswell	Madison Square Garden (16,154); New York City, NY
December 6, 2025*; 7:00 p.m., ESPN	No. 14	vs. No. 13 Tennessee; Music City Madness	W 75–62	7–2	16 – Tied	8 – Wagler	5 – Wagler	Bridgestone Arena (16,157); Nashville, TN
December 9, 2025; 6:30 p.m., NBCSN/Peacock	No. 13	at Ohio State	W 88–80	8–2 (1–0)	23 – Wagler	9 – Mirković	5 – Wagler	Value City Arena (9,974); Columbus, OH
December 13, 2025; 3:00 p.m., NBCSN/Peacock	No. 13	No. 23 Nebraska	L 80–83	8–3 (1–1)	20 – Boswell	10 – Stojaković	10 – Wagler	State Farm Center (15,266); Champaign, IL
December 22, 2025*; 7:00 p.m., FS1	No. 20	vs. Missouri; Braggin' Rights	W 91–48	9–3	22 – Wagler	11 – Z. Ivišić	5 – Mirković	Enterprise Center (18,505); St. Louis, MO
December 29, 2025*; 2:00 p.m., BTN	No. 20	Southern	W 90–55	10–3	15 – Davis	7 – Tied	10 – Wagler	State Farm Center (15,544); Champaign, IL
January 3, 2026; 6:00 p.m., BTN	No. 20	at Penn State	W 73–65	11–3 (2–1)	18 – Boswell	10 – Tied	3 – Tied	Palestra (4,686); Philadelphia, PA
January 8, 2026; 7:30 p.m., BTN	No. 16	Rutgers	W 81–55	12–3 (3–1)	17 – Wagler	8 – Stojaković	5 – Boswell	State Farm Center (13,190); Champaign, IL
January 11, 2026; 11:00 a.m., FOX	No. 16	at No. 19 Iowa; Rivalry	W 75–69	13–3 (4–1)	19 – Wagler	12 – Mirković	5 – Mirković	Carver–Hawkeye Arena (13,559); Iowa City, IA
January 14, 2026; 7:30 p.m., BTN	No. 13	at Northwestern; Rivalry	W 79–68	14–3 (5–1)	22 – Wagler	7 – T. Ivišić	6 – Boswell	Welsh-Ryan Arena (7,039); Evanston, IL
January 17, 2026; 11:00 a.m., BTN	No. 13	Minnesota	W 77–67	15–3 (6–1)	18 – Z. Ivišić	9 – Z. Ivišić	5 – Wagler	State Farm Center (15,544); Champaign, IL
January 21, 2026; 6:00 p.m., BTN	No. 11	Maryland	W 89–70	16–3 (7–1)	30 – Stojaković	9 – Tied	8 – Wagler	State Farm Center (15,201); Champaign, IL
January 24, 2026; 2:00 p.m., FOX	No. 11	at No. 4 Purdue	W 88–82	17–3 (8–1)	46 – Wagler	8 – Tied	4 – Wagler	Mackey Arena (14,876); West Lafayette, IN
January 29, 2026; 8:00 p.m., FS1	No. 9	Washington	W 75–66	18–3 (9–1)	22 – Wagler	6 – Tied	8 – Wagler	State Farm Center (15,544); Champaign, IL
February 1, 2026; 3:00 p.m., FS1	No. 9	at No. 5 Nebraska	W 78–69	19–3 (10–1)	28 – Wagler	8 – Tied	5 – Wagler	Pinnacle Bank Arena (15,513); Lincoln, NE
February 4, 2026; 8:00 p.m., BTN	No. 5	Northwestern; Rivalry	W 84–44	20–3 (11–1)	17 – Stojaković	12 – T. Ivišić	5 – Tied	State Farm Center (15,544); Champaign, IL
February 7, 2026; 7:00 p.m., FOX	No. 5	at No. 10 Michigan State	L 82–85 ^{OT}	20–4 (11–2)	18 – Mirković	8 – Z. Ivišić	6 – Mirković	Breslin Center (14,797); East Lansing, MI
February 10, 2026; 7:00 p.m., NBCSN/Peacock	No. 8	Wisconsin	L 90–92 ^{OT}	20–5 (11–3)	34 – Wagler	11 – T. Ivišić	7 – Wagler	State Farm Center (15,544); Champaign, IL
February 15, 2026; 12:00 p.m., CBS	No. 8	Indiana; Rivalry	W 71–51	21–5 (12–3)	25 – Mirković	8 – Humrichous	3 – Tied	State Farm Center (15,544); Champaign, IL
February 18, 2026; 9:00 p.m., BTN	No. 10	at USC	W 101–65	22–5 (13–3)	22 – Stojaković	7 – Davis	8 – Boswell	Galen Center (7,327); Los Angeles, CA
February 21, 2026; 7:00 p.m., FOX	No. 10	at UCLA	L 94–95 ^{OT}	22–6 (13–4)	19 – Wagler	8 – Wagler	6 – Wagler	Pauley Pavilion (10,036); Los Angeles, CA
February 27, 2026; 7:00 p.m., FOX	No. 10	No. 3 Michigan	L 70–84	22–7 (13–5)	23 – Wagler	10 – Mirković	3 – Wagler	State Farm Center (15,544); Champaign, IL
March 3, 2026; 8:00 p.m., NBCSN/Peacock	No. 11	Oregon	W 80–54	23–7 (14–5)	21 – Stojaković	12 – Stojaković	5 – Wagler	State Farm Center (15,544); Champaign, IL
March 8, 2026; 2:00 p.m., FOX	No. 11	at Maryland	W 78–72	24–7 (15–5)	22 – Mirković	11 – Mirković	3 – Tied	Xfinity Center (15,674); College Park, MD
Big Ten Tournament
March 13, 2026; 1:30 p.m., BTN	(4) No. 9	vs. (5) No. 23 Wisconsin; Quarterfinal	L 88–91 ^{OT}	24–8	19 – Tied	7 – Tied	8 – Wagler	United Center (18,988); Chicago, IL
NCAA Tournament
March 19, 2026*; 8:25 p.m., TNT	(3 S) No. 13	vs. (14 S) Penn; First round	W 105–70	25–8	29 – Mirković	17 – Mirković	7 – Wagler	Bon Secours Wellness Arena (14,092); Greenville, SC
March 21, 2026*; 6:50 p.m., CBS	(3 S) No. 13	vs. (11 S) VCU; Second round	W 76–55	26–8	21 – Stojaković	11 – T. Ivišić	4 – Mirković	Bon Secours Wellness Arena (14,178); Greenville, SC
March 26, 2026*; 9:05 p.m., TBS/truTV	(3 S) No. 13	vs. (2 S) No. 5 Houston; Sweet Sixteen	W 65–55	27–8	14 – Mirković	12 – Wagler	3 – Tied	Toyota Center (17,307); Houston, TX
March 28, 2026; 5:09 p.m., TBS/truTV	(3 S) No. 13	vs. (9 S) Iowa; Elite Eight / Rivalry	W 71–59	28–8	25 – Wagler	12 – Mirković	3 – Wagler	Toyota Center (17,010); Houston, TX
April 4, 2026; 5:09 p.m., TBS/truTV/HBO Max	(3 S) No. 13	vs. (2 E) No. 7 UConn; Final Four	L 62–71	28–9	20 – Wagler	8 – Tied	2 – Wagler	Lucas Oil Stadium (72,111); Indianapolis, IN
*Non-conference game. ^{#}Rankings from AP Poll. (#) Tournament seedings in parentheses. S=South. E=East. All times are in Central Time.

== Rankings ==
Ranking movements Legend: ██ Increase in ranking ██ Decrease in ranking
	Week																				
Poll	Pre	1	2	3	4	5	6	7	8	9	10	11	12	13	14	15	16	17	18	19	Final
AP	17	14	8	13	14	13	18	20	20	16	13	11	9	5	8	10	10	11	9	13	5
Coaches	14	14	8	14	15	13	18	19	19	16	13	11	10	6	7	10	11	11	9	12	5
