= David Mirković =

Montenegrin basketball player (born 2006)

No. 0 – Illinois Fighting Illini
- Position: Power forward
- League: Big Ten Conference

Personal information
- Born: January 6, 2006 (age 20) Nikšić, Montenegro, Serbia and Montenegro
- Listed height: 6 ft 9 in (2.06 m)
- Listed weight: 250 lb (113 kg)

Career information
- College: Illinois (2025–present)
- Playing career: 2022–present

Career history
- 2022–2025: Studentski centar

Career highlights
- Big Ten All-Freshman Team (2026); Nike Hoop Summit (2025)

David Mirković (Montenegrin: Давид Мирковић; born 6 January 2006) is a Montenegrin college basketball player for the Illinois Fighting Illini of the Big Ten Conference.

== Early life and high school ==
According to Sports Illustrated writer Kevin Sweeney, "[Mirković's] basketball roots come from his mother, Jelena, who stands 6'3" and played with the Yugoslavian national team in the 1990s." Mirković credits his mother, whom he calls "a crazy competitor and winner", with instilling those qualities in him.

Mirković moved from his hometown of Nikšić to Montenegro's capital of Podgorica without his family at age 14 in order to train with a more competitive club, namely SC Derby, whose senior team plays in the ABA League. He became close friends with a pair of teammates, 7-foot Croatian twins Tomislav and Zvonimir Ivišić. While at Derby, Mirković averaged 8.8 points and 6.7 rebounds in 23.6 minutes per game during the 2024–25 season.

When Mirković first came to Derby, US college basketball was not seen as a desirable option for highly rated European players, with college programs not allowed to provide benefits beyond scholarships to players. With the legalization of NIL payments in 2021, NCAA Division I programs began aggressively pursuing European players—among them the Ivišić twins. Zvonimir was the first of the twins to take advantage of this era, signing with Kentucky in 2023, followed by Tomislav a year later with Illinois. Sweeney noted that "Mirković quickly realized that college was likely his next step, and his agent Miško Ražnatović received plenty of interest once he made it clear his client was open to playing in America."

Mirković drew especially strong interest from Illinois, as head coach Brad Underwood "had fallen in love with Mirković’s game on film," and Ražnatović had established trust with the program, as he also represented the Ivišić twins—Tomislav had proven successful with the Illini, and Zvonimir, who had left Kentucky for Arkansas in 2024, transferred to Illinois in 2025. Mirković ultimmately committed to play at Illinois in April 2025.

== College career ==
In his collegiate debut on November 3, 2025, Mirković tallied a double-double with 19 points and 14 rebounds in a win versus Jackson State. On November 7, he totaled 17 points and 11 rebounds in a victory against Florida Gulf Coast. On November 14, Mirković notched 27 points and 21 rebounds in a victory over Colgate. For his performance for the first two weeks in November through the 17th, he was named the Big Ten freshman of the week both weeks. On December 9, Mirković dropped 22 points and nine rebounds in a win versus Ohio State.

Prior to his sophomore season, Mirković had foot surgery and an emergency appendectomy, missing the start of the season.
