= Jerry West Award =

Annual basketball award

- Awarded for: the nation's top male shooting guard in NCAA basketball
- Country: United States
- Presented by: Naismith Memorial Basketball Hall of Fame

History
- First award: 2015
- Most recent: Keaton Wagler, Illinois
- Website: Official website

The Jerry West Shooting Guard of the Year Award is an annual basketball award given by the Naismith Memorial Basketball Hall of Fame to the top men's collegiate shooting guard. The award is named after former Los Angeles Lakers shooting guard, Jerry West. Following the success of the Bob Cousy Award that had been awarded since 2004, the award was one of four new awards (along with the Julius Erving Award, Karl Malone Award and Kareem Abdul-Jabbar Award) created as part of the inaugural College Basketball Awards show in 2015. The inaugural winner was D'Angelo Russell of Ohio State.

== Key ==
| * | Awarded a national player of the year award that same season: Sporting News; Oscar Robertson Trophy; Associated Press; NABC; Naismith; Wooden |

== Winners ==
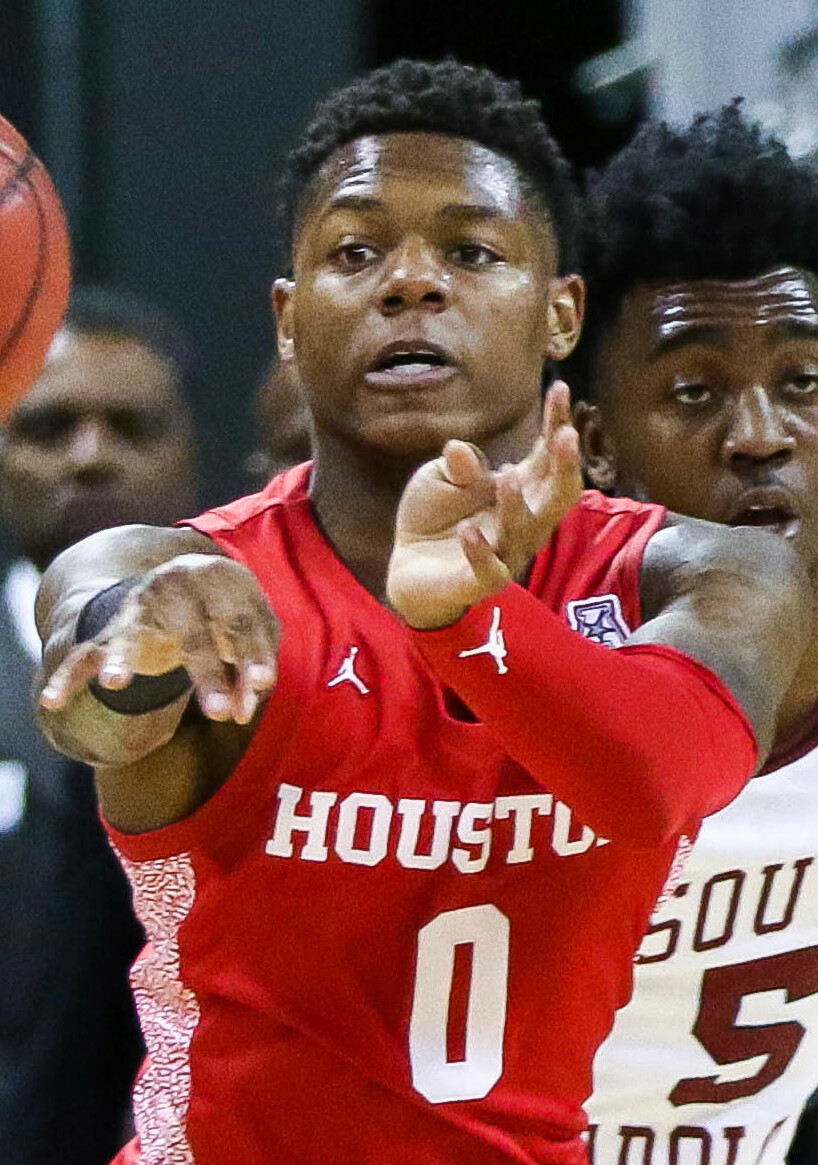
Marcus Sasser, Houston, 2023

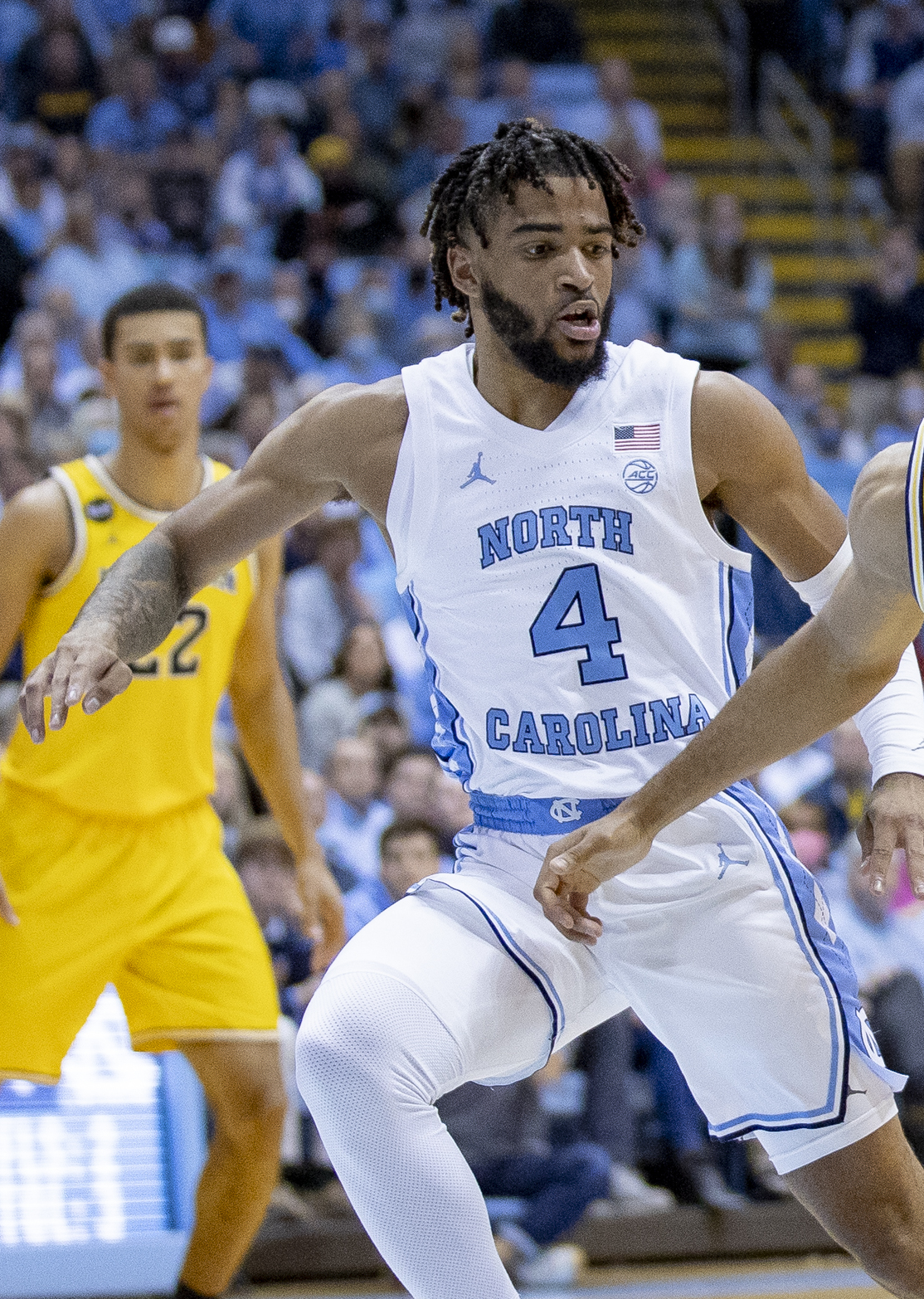
R. J. Davis, North Carolina, 2024

| Season | Player | School | Class | Reference |
|---|---|---|---|---|
| 2014–15 | D'Angelo Russell | Ohio State | Freshman | |
| 2015–16 | Buddy Hield* | Oklahoma | Senior | |
| 2016–17 | Malik Monk | Kentucky | Freshman | |
| 2017–18 | Carsen Edwards | Purdue | Sophomore | |
| 2018–19 | RJ Barrett | Duke | Freshman | |
| 2019–20 | Myles Powell | Seton Hall | Senior | |
| 2020–21 | Chris Duarte | Oregon | Senior | |
| 2021–22 | Johnny Davis | Wisconsin | Sophomore | |
| 2022–23 | Marcus Sasser | Houston | Senior | |
| 2023–24 | R. J. Davis | North Carolina | Senior | |
| 2024–25 | Chaz Lanier | Tennessee | Senior | |
| 2025–26 | Keaton Wagler | Illinois | Freshman | |
