= 2024–25 Illinois Fighting Illini men's basketball team =

American college basketball season

2024–25 Illinois Fighting Illini men's basketball

NCAA tournament, Second Round
- Conference: Big Ten Conference
- Record: 22–13 (12–8 Big Ten)
- Head coach: Brad Underwood (8th season)
- Associate head coach: Orlando Antigua (5th overall, 1st season)
- Assistant coaches: Kwa Jones (1st season); Geoff Alexander (4th season); Zach Hamer (2nd season); Tyler Underwood (2nd season)
- Captains: Kylan Boswell; Dra Gibbs-Lawhorn
- Home arena: State Farm Center

2024–25 Big Ten Conference men's basketball standings
	Conf.				Overall
Team	W		L	PCT	W		L	PCT
No. 7 Michigan State	17	–	3	.850	30	–	7	.811
No. 9 Maryland	14	–	6	.700	27	–	9	.750
No. 10 Michigan †	14	–	6	.700	27	–	10	.730
UCLA	13	–	7	.650	23	–	11	.676
No. 16 Wisconsin	13	–	7	.650	27	–	10	.730
No. 14 Purdue	13	–	7	.650	24	–	12	.667
Illinois	12	–	8	.600	22	–	13	.629
Oregon	12	–	8	.600	25	–	10	.714
Indiana	10	–	10	.500	19	–	13	.594
Ohio State	9	–	11	.450	17	–	15	.531
Rutgers	8	–	12	.400	15	–	17	.469
Minnesota	7	–	13	.350	15	–	17	.469
Northwestern	7	–	13	.350	17	–	16	.515
USC	7	–	13	.350	17	–	18	.486
Iowa	7	–	13	.350	17	–	16	.515
Nebraska	7	–	13	.350	21	–	14	.600
Penn State	6	–	14	.300	16	–	15	.516
Washington	4	–	16	.200	13	–	18	.419
† 2025 Big Ten tournament winner Rankings from AP poll

The 2024–25 Illinois Fighting Illini men's basketball team represented the University of Illinois during the 2024–25 NCAA Division I men's basketball season. The Illini were led by eighth-year head coach Brad Underwood. The Illini played their home games at the State Farm Center in Champaign, Illinois as members of the Big Ten Conference.

The Illini opened their season just outside of the preseason rankings and defeated the Eastern Illinois Panthers 112–67, led by a 31 point scoring performance from freshman Will Riley.

The Illinois Fighting Illini drew an average home attendance of 15,091, the 11th-highest of all college basketball teams.

== Previous season ==
The Fighting Illini finished the 2023–24 season 29–9, 14–6 in Big Ten play to finish in second place. They defeated Ohio State, Nebraska, and Wisconsin to win the Big Ten tournament championship. As a result, they received the conference's automatic bid to the NCAA tournament as the No. 3 seed in the East region. They beat Morehead State and Duquesne to advance to the Sweet Sixteen for the first time since 2005. There they defeated Iowa State to advance to the Elite Eight before being blown out by eventual tournament champion UConn.

== Offseason ==
After the previous season ended, Marcus Domask sought a medical hardship waiver from the NCAA to play in the 2024-25 season. After his waiver application was denied, he declared for the NBA draft.

After three years at Illinois, assistant coach Chester Frazier joined West Virginia's coaching staff. This resulted in Sencire Harris, who had previously pledged to stay with the team, to enter the transfer portal, with Amani Hansberry soon following, as both were primarily recruited by Frazier. Both players ultimately followed Frazier to West Virginia. Replacing Frazier on the coaching staff was Orlando Antigua, who had previously served as assistant coach at Illinois prior to a stint at Kentucky.

Following Will Riley's committing and reclassifying to 2024, Jeremiah Fears decommitted from the Illini, due to his desire to reclassify to 2024 as well.

On September 20, the Illini announced that assistant coach Tim Anderson was taking an indefinite leave of absence, with Kwa Jones temporarily promoted to fill his position.

=== Departures ===
Name	Pos.	Height	Weight	Year	Hometown	Reason for departure
Quincy Guerrier	F	6'8"	220	Graduate Student	Montreal, Quebec	Graduated; Undrafted, signed with the Toronto Raptors
Terrence Shannon Jr.	G	6'6"	215	Fifth Year	Chicago, Illinois	Graduated; Drafted 27th overall in 2024 NBA Draft by the Minnesota Timberwolves
Marcus Domask	G/F	6'6"	215	Graduate Student	Waupun, Wisconsin	Graduated; Undrafted, signed with the Chicago Bulls
Justin Harmon	G	6'4"	180	Graduate Student	Chicago, Illinois	Graduated
Dain Dainja	F/C	6'9"	255	Redshirt Junior	Brooklyn Park, Minnesota	Transferred to Memphis
Sencire Harris	G	6'4"	160	Redshirt Freshman	North Canton, Ohio	Transferred to West Virginia
Amani Hansberry	F/C	6'8"	225	Freshman	Silver Spring, Maryland	Transferred to West Virginia
Luke Goode	G/F	6'7"	210	Junior	Fort Wayne, Indiana	Graduated; Transferred to Indiana
Coleman Hawkins	F/C	6'10"	225	Senior	Sacramento, California	Graduated; Transferred to Kansas State
Niccolo Moretti	G	6'1"	160	Redshirt Freshman	Bologna, Italy	Transferred to Florida Atlantic
Max Williams	G	6'2"	192	Senior	Chicago, Illinois	Graduated

=== Incoming transfers ===
Name	Number	Pos.	Height	Weight	Year	Hometown	Previous School
Jake Davis	15	G/F	6'6"	210	Sophomore	McCordsville, Indiana	Mercer
Tre White	22	G/F	6'7"	205	Junior	Dallas, Texas	Louisville
Kylan Boswell	4	G	6'2"	200	Junior	Urbana, Illinois	Arizona
Carey Booth	0	F	6'10"	203	Sophomore	Englewood, Colorado	Notre Dame
Ben Humrichous	3	F	6'9"	220	Fifth Year	Tipton, Indiana	Evansville

=== 2024 recruiting class ===
College recruiting information
Name	Hometown	School	Height	Weight	Commit date
Morez Johnson Jr. F/C	Riverdale, IL	Thornton Township	6 ft 9 in (2.06 m)	225 lb (102 kg)	Nov 5, 2021
Morez Johnson Jr. F/C	Recruit ratings: Rivals: 247Sports: On3: ESPN:				
Jason Jakstys; F	Yorkville, IL	Yorkville	6 ft 10 in (2.08 m)	200 lb (91 kg)	Jul 23, 2023
Jason Jakstys; F	Recruit ratings: Rivals: 247Sports: On3: ESPN:				
Tomislav Ivišić; C	Vodice, Croatia	SC Derby	7 ft 1 in (2.16 m)	230 lb (100 kg)	May 6, 2024
Tomislav Ivišić; C	Recruit ratings: 247Sports:				
Kasparas Jakučionis; G	Vilnius, Lithuania	FC Barcelona	6 ft 6 in (1.98 m)	200 lb (91 kg)	May 28, 2024
Kasparas Jakučionis; G	Recruit ratings: 247Sports: On3:				
Will Riley; F	Kitchener, Ontario	The Phelps School	6 ft 8 in (2.03 m)	180 lb (82 kg)	Jun 23, 2024
Will Riley; F	Recruit ratings: Rivals: 247Sports: On3: ESPN:				
Overall recruit ranking: Rivals: 11 247Sports: 10 On3: 20
Note: In many cases, Scout, Rivals, 247Sports, On3, and ESPN may conflict in their listings of height and weight.; In these cases, the average was taken. ESPN grades are on a 100-point scale.; Sources: "2024 Illinois Commits". Rivals.; "ESPN- Illinois Fighting Illini Men's Basketball Recruiting". ESPN.; "2024 Team Ranking". Rivals.; "2024–25 Illinois Fighting Illini men's basketball team". 247Sports.; "2024–25 Illinois Fighting Illini men's basketball team". On3.

== Roster ==
2024–25 Illinois Fighting Illini men's basketball team
Players
Coaches

Pos.	#	Name	Height	Weight	Year	Previous school	Hometown
F	0	Carey Booth	6 ft 10 in (2.08 m)	215 lb (98 kg)	So	Notre Dame	Englewood, Colorado
G	2	Dra Gibbs-Lawhorn	6 ft 1 in (1.85 m)	185 lb (84 kg)	So	Word of God	Lafayette, Indiana
F	3	Ben Humrichous	6 ft 9 in (2.06 m)	225 lb (102 kg)	GS	Evansville	Tipton, Indiana
G	4	Kylan Boswell	6 ft 2 in (1.88 m)	205 lb (93 kg)	Jr	Arizona	Champaign, Illinois
G	5	AJ Redd (W)	6 ft 3 in (1.91 m)	170 lb (77 kg)	Jr	St. Ignatius	Chicago, Illinois
F	7	Will Riley	6 ft 8 in (2.03 m)	195 lb (88 kg)	Fr	The Phelps School	Kitchener, Ontario
C	13	Tomislav Ivišić	7 ft 1 in (2.16 m)	255 lb (116 kg)	So	SC Derby	Vodice, Croatia
F	15	Jake Davis	6 ft 6 in (1.98 m)	205 lb (93 kg)	So	Mercer	McCordsville, Indiana
G/F	20	Ty Rodgers (redshirt)	6 ft 6 in (1.98 m)	210 lb (95 kg)	Jr	Thornton Township	Saginaw, Michigan
F	21	Morez Johnson Jr.	6 ft 9 in (2.06 m)	255 lb (116 kg)	Fr	Thornton Township	Riverdale, Illinois
G	22	Tre White	6 ft 7 in (2.01 m)	210 lb (95 kg)	Jr	Louisville	Dallas, Texas
G	24	Keaton Kutcher (W)	6 ft 2 in (1.88 m)	195 lb (88 kg)	RS Jr	South Dakota	Mount Vernon, Iowa
F	31	Jason Jakstys (redshirt)	6 ft 10 in (2.08 m)	210 lb (95 kg)	Fr	Yorkville High School	Yorkville, Illinois
G	32	Kasparas Jakučionis	6 ft 6 in (1.98 m)	205 lb (93 kg)	Fr	FC Barcelona	Vilnius, Lithuania

Head coach

- Brad Underwood (Kansas State)

Assistant coach(es)

- Orlando Antigua (Pittsburgh)
- Geoff Alexander (Western Illinois)
- Zach Hamer (Vanderbilt)
- Tyler Underwood (Illinois)
- Kwa Jones (Houston)

Legend

- (C) Team captain
- (S) Suspended
- (I) Ineligible
- (W) Walk-on
- Injured
- Current redshirt

Roster
Last update: 10/31/24

Note: Tomislav Ivišić lost one year of eligibility due to playing professionally in Europe, thus he is a sophomore for NCAA purposes.

=== Roster movement ===
- Kasparas Jakučionis missed two games due to a wrist injury.
- Tomislav Ivisic missed three games due to illness.
- Morez Johnson Jr. broke his wrist in the February 15 game against Michigan State. Johnson missed the rest of the regular season and returned in the Big Ten Tournament.
- Tre White missed two games due to illness.

== Schedule and results ==
Date time, TV	Rank^{#}	Opponent^{#}	Result	Record	High points	High rebounds	High assists	Site (attendance) city, state
Exhibition
October 27, 2024*; 11:00 a.m., SECN		at No. 24 Ole Miss; Charity Benefit for CASA of North Mississippi	L 74–91		15 – Gibbs-Lawhorn	6 – Tied	5 – Tied	SJB Pavilion (7,023); Oxford, MS
Regular season
November 4, 2024*; 7:00 p.m., B1G+		Eastern Illinois	W 112–67	1–0	31 – Riley	14 – Ivisic	7 – Jakucionis	State Farm Center (15,246); Champaign, IL
November 8, 2024*; 7:00 p.m., Peacock		SIU Edwardsville	W 90–58	2–0	18 – Ivisic	8 – Tied	13 – Jakucionis	State Farm Center (15,544); Champaign, IL
November 13, 2024*; 8:00 p.m., BTN		Oakland	W 66–54	3–0	20 – Ivisic	6 – Tied	3 – Tied	State Farm Center (15,299); Champaign, IL
November 20, 2024*; 8:00 p.m., SECN	No. 25	vs. No. 8 Alabama; C.M. Newton Classic	L 87–100	3–1	18 – Riley	10 – Ivisic	6 – Jakucionis	Legacy Arena (11,533); Birmingham, AL
November 23, 2024*; 3:00 p.m., B1G+	No. 25	Maryland Eastern Shore; Turkey Throwdown	W 87–40	4–1	19 – Riley	13 – Johnson Jr.	4 – Jakucionis	State Farm Center (13,456); Champaign, IL
November 25, 2024*; 8:00 p.m., BTN		Little Rock; Turkey Throwdown	W 92–34	5–1	21 – Jakucionis	11 – Tied	7 – Boswell	State Farm Center (12,131); Champaign, IL
November 28, 2024*; 3:00 p.m., CBS		vs. No. 19 Arkansas; Thanksgiving Hoops Showcase; Turkey Throwdown	W 90–77	6–1	23 – Jakucionis	10 – Ivisic	6 – Boswell	T-Mobile Center (5,707); Kansas City, MO
December 6, 2024; 8:00 p.m., BTN	No. 19	at Northwestern; Rivalry	L 66–70 ^{OT}	6–2 (0–1)	20 – Jakucionis	12 – Ivisic	7 – Jakucionis	Welsh–Ryan Arena (7,039); Evanston, IL
December 10, 2024; 8:00 p.m., Peacock		No. 20 Wisconsin	W 86–80	7–2 (1–1)	24 – Jakucionis	11 – Ivisic	6 – Boswell	State Farm Center (15,544); Champaign, IL
December 14, 2024*; 4:30 p.m., FOX		No. 1 Tennessee	L 64–66	7–3	22 – Jakucionis	12 – Ivisic	2 – Jakucionis	State Farm Center (15,544); Champaign, IL
December 22, 2024*; 12:00 p.m., ESPN		vs. Missouri; Braggin' Rights	W 80–77	8–3	21 – Jakucionis	10 – Ivisic	5 – Boswell	Enterprise Center (18,497); St. Louis, MO
December 29, 2024*; 1:00 p.m., BTN	No. 24	Chicago State	W 117–64	9–3	23 – Ivisic	10 – Boswell	10 – Boswell	State Farm Center (15,544); Champaign, IL
January 2, 2025; 9:00 p.m., FS1	No. 22	at No. 9 Oregon	W 109–77	10–3 (2–1)	20 – White	11 – White	6 – Jakucionis	Matthew Knight Arena (7,010); Eugene, OR
January 5, 2025; 3:00 p.m., BTN	No. 22	at Washington	W 81–77	11–3 (3–1)	18 – Jakucionis	9 – Ivisic	6 – Jakucionis	Alaska Airlines Arena (8,156); Seattle, WA
January 8, 2025; 8:00 p.m., BTN	No. 13	Penn State	W 91–52	12–3 (4–1)	21 – Humrichous	11 – Johnson Jr.	6 – Tied	State Farm Center (13,883); Champaign, IL
January 11, 2025; 11:00 a.m., BTN	No. 13	USC	L 72–82	12–4 (4–2)	15 – Humrichous	8 – Tied	6 – Boswell	State Farm Center (15,544); Champaign, IL
January 14, 2025; 6:00 p.m., Peacock	No. 19	at Indiana; Rivalry	W 94–69	13–4 (5–2)	22 – Boswell	11 – Ivisic	5 – Jakucionis	Simon Skjodt Assembly Hall (17,222); Bloomington, IN
January 19, 2025; 11:00 a.m., CBS	No. 19	at No. 12 Michigan State	L 78–80	13–5 (5–3)	19 – Riley	9 – Boswell	5 – Ivisic	Breslin Center (14,797); East Lansing, MI
January 23, 2025; 8:00 p.m., FS1	No. 17	Maryland	L 71–90	13–6 (5–4)	21 – Jakucionis	9 – Boswell	7 – Jakucionis	State Farm Center (15,544); Champaign, IL
January 26, 2025; 2:00 p.m., BTN	No. 17	Northwestern; Rivalry	W 83–74	14–6 (6–4)	17 – Boswell	10 – Jakucionis	7 – Jakucionis	State Farm Center (15,544); Champaign, IL
January 30, 2025; 7:30 p.m., FS1	No. 18	at Nebraska	L 74–80 ^{OT}	14–7 (6–5)	18 – Jakucionis	13 – Tied	4 – Jakucionis	Pinnacle Bank Arena (14,893); Lincoln, NE
February 2, 2025; 12:00 p.m., CBS	No. 18	Ohio State	W 87–79	15–7 (7–5)	24 – Riley	15 – Johnson Jr.	7 – Jakucionis	State Farm Center (15,544); Champaign, IL
February 5, 2025; 7:30 p.m., BTN	No. 23	at Rutgers	L 73–82	15–8 (7–6)	18 – Riley	10 – Boswell	6 – Riley	Jersey Mike's Arena (8,000); Piscataway, NJ
February 8, 2025; 5:00 p.m., BTN	No. 23	at Minnesota	W 95–74	16–8 (8–6)	27 – Riley	11 – Ivisic	7 – Riley	Williams Arena (10,091); Minneapolis, MN
February 11, 2025; 7:00 p.m., Peacock		UCLA	W 83–78	17–8 (9–6)	24 – Jakucionis	8 – Jakucionis	4 – Jakucionis	State Farm Center (15,544); Champaign, IL
February 15, 2025; 7:00 p.m., FOX		No. 11 Michigan State	L 65–79	17–9 (9–7)	17 – Tied	7 – Tied	6 – Riley	State Farm Center (15,544); Champaign, IL
February 18, 2025; 7:30 p.m., FS1		at No. 11 Wisconsin	L 74–95	17–10 (9–8)	17 – Gibbs-Lawhorn	5 – Tied	5 – Gibbs-Lawhorn	Kohl Center (15,170); Madison, WI
February 22, 2025*; 7:00 p.m., FOX		vs. No. 3 Duke; SentinelOne Classic	L 67–110	17–11	16 – White	7 – Jakucionis	6 – Jakucionis	Madison Square Garden (19,812); New York City, NY
February 25, 2025; 8:00 p.m., FS1		Iowa; Rivalry	W 81–61	18–11 (10–8)	22 – Ivisic	7 – Tied	7 – Boswell	State Farm Center (15,544); Champaign, IL
March 2, 2025; 2:45 p.m., CBS		at No. 15 Michigan	W 93–73	19–11 (11–8)	19 – White	11 – White	5 – Tied	Crisler Center (12,707); Ann Arbor, MI
March 7, 2025; 7:00 p.m., FOX		No. 18 Purdue	W 88–80	20–11 (12–8)	22 – Riley	9 – White	7 – Jakucionis	State Farm Center (15,544); Champaign, IL
Big Ten tournament
March 13, 2025; 5:30 p.m., BTN	(7) No. 24	vs. (15) Iowa; Second round	W 106–94	21–11	24 – Boswell	10 – Ivisic	7 – Boswell	Gainbridge Fieldhouse (13,411); Indianapolis, IN
March 14, 2025; 5:30 p.m., BTN	(7) No. 24	vs. (2) No. 11 Maryland; Quarterfinals	L 65–88	21–12	15 – Tied	10 – Jakucionis	4 – Jakucionis	Gainbridge Fieldhouse (13,951); Indianapolis, IN
NCAA Tournament
March 21, 2025*; 8:45 p.m., CBS	(6 MW)	vs. (11 MW) Xavier; First Round	W 86–73	22–12	22 – Riley	10 – Ivisic	10 – Jakucionis	Fiserv Forum (16,894); Milwaukee, WI
March 23, 2025*; 4:15 p.m., CBS	(6 MW)	vs. (3 MW) No. 18 Kentucky; Second Round	L 75–84	22–13	23 – Boswell	7 – Tied	6 – Boswell	Fiserv Forum (16,829); Milwaukee, WI
*Non-conference game. ^{#}Rankings from AP Poll. (#) Tournament seedings in parentheses. MW=Midwest. All times are in Central Time.

== Rankings ==
Ranking movements Legend: ██ Increase in ranking ██ Decrease in ranking — = Not ranked RV = Received votes
	Week																				
Poll	Pre	1	2	3	4	5	6	7	8	9	10	11	12	13	14	15	16	17	18	19	Final
AP	RV	RV	25	RV	19	RV	RV	24	22	13	19	17	18	23	RV	RV	RV	RV	24	RV	RV
Coaches	24	20	20	RV	17	RV	RV	22	20	15	20	17	20	25	RV	RV	—	RV	25	RV	RV
