= Tipton High School (Indiana) =

Location
- 619 South Main Street; Tipton, Tipton County, Indiana 46072; United States; 40.273577°N 86.040077°W

Information
- Type: Public high school
- Established: c. 1898
- School district: Tipton Community School Corporation
- Superintendent: Ryan Glaze
- Principal: Richard Stillson
- Teaching staff: 35.17 (FTE)
- Grades: 9-12
- Enrollment: 437 (2024-2025)
- Student to teacher ratio: 12.43
- Color
- Athletics conference: Hoosier Athletic Conference
- Team name: Blue Devils
- Rivals: Hamilton Heights High School
- Newspaper: Devil's Advocate
- Website: Official Website

Tipton High School is a public high school located in Tipton, Indiana.

== Athletics ==
Tipton High School's athletic teams are the Blue Devils and they compete in the Hoosier Athletic Conference. The school offers a wide range of athletics including:

- Baseball
- Basketball (Men's and Women's)
- Cheerleading
- Cross Country (Men's and Women's)
- Soccer (Men's and Women's)
- Football
- Golf (Men's and Women's)
- Softball
- Swimming (Men's and Women's)
- Tennis (Men's and Women's)
- Track and field (Men's and Women's)
- Volleyball
- Wrestling

=== Golf ===
The 1993-1994 boys golf team won the IHSAA Boys Golf State Championship.

=== Softball ===
The 1989-1990 girls softball team won the IHSAA Girls Softball State Championship

== Notable alumni ==
- Darrell Elston (1971), basketball player who played for the Indiana Pacers
- Major E. Holmes, dean of the New York State College of Ceramics at Alfred University and founder and head of the Department of Ceramic Engineering at the Missouri School of Mine
- Ben Humrichous (2020), basketball player for the Brooklynn Nets and NBA G League Affiliate Long Island Nets.

== See also ==
- List of high schools in Indiana
