= Andrej Stojaković =

Serbian-Greek-American basketball player (born 2004)

No. 2 – Illinois Fighting Illini
- Position: Shooting guard
- League: Big Ten Conference

Personal information
- Born: August 17, 2004 (age 22) Thessaloniki, Greece
- Listed height: 6 ft 7 in (2.01 m)
- Listed weight: 215 lb (98 kg)

Career information
- High school: Jesuit (Carmichael, California)
- College: Stanford (2023–2024); California (2024–2025); Illinois (2025–present)

Career highlights
- McDonald's All-American (2023); Nike Hoop Summit (2023)

Andrej Stojaković (Serbian Cyrillic: Андреј Стојаковић, Greek: Αντρέι Κίνης Στογιάκοβιτς; born August 17, 2004) is a Serbian-Greek college basketball player on the Illinois Fighting Illini. He previously played for the Stanford Cardinal and California Golden Bears.

He is the eldest child of former Serbian professional basketball player Peja Stojaković. He was a consensus four-star recruit and one of the top players in the 2023 class.

== High school career ==
Stojaković attended Jesuit High School in the Sacramento suburb of Carmichael, California. As a junior, Stojaković averaged 25.3 points, 9.3 rebounds, and 1.4 steals per game in 26 games. On January 24, 2023, Stojaković was selected as a McDonald's All-American.

=== Recruiting ===
Stojaković was a consensus four-star recruit and one of the top players in the 2023 class, according to major recruiting services. He received offers from many NCAA Division I programs, including Kentucky, UCLA, Texas, Indiana, Florida, Louisville, Stanford, Tennessee, Oregon, UConn, and Georgia Tech among others. Stojaković committed to playing college basketball for Stanford on November 7, 2022.

College recruiting
Name	Hometown	School	Height	Weight	Commit date
Andrej Stojaković; SG / SF	Carmichael, CA	Jesuit (CA)	6 ft 7 in (2.01 m)	185 lb (84 kg)	Nov 7, 2022
Andrej Stojaković; SG / SF	Recruit ratings: Rivals: 247Sports: ESPN: (89)				
Overall recruit ranking: Rivals: 41 247Sports: 19 ESPN: 22
Note: In many cases, Scout, Rivals, 247Sports, On3, and ESPN may conflict in their listings of height and weight.; In these cases, the average was taken. ESPN grades are on a 100-point scale.; Sources: "Stanford 2023 Basketball Commitments". Rivals.; "2023 Stanford Cardinal Recruiting Class". ESPN.; "2023 Team Ranking". Rivals.

== College career ==
As a freshman at Stanford, Stojaković averaged 7.8 points and 3.4 rebounds per game. Following the season, he transferred to California, choosing the Golden Bears over Kentucky, North Carolina, and Michigan.

Following his sophomore season, he transferred again, this time to Illinois. After his junior year at Illinois, where he was a key member of a team that made the Final Four, Stojaković declared for the 2026 NBA draft while maintaining his college eligibility. On May 27, 2026, he withdrew from the draft and confirmed he would be back for a second season with the Illini.

Stojakovic's 46-point November 17, 2026, outburst against Duke was the most points ever scored by an opponent in at Cameron Indoor Stadium, surpassing Grady Wallace's 43-point performance for South Carolina in February 1957. He was one point shy of the record for most points scored by a player against Duke at any site, and two points shy of the all-time single game record for points scored by any player at Cameron Indoor. He tied (with former teammate Keaton Wagler and two others) for the second most points against an AP Poll top 5 opponent on the road.

== National team career ==
Due to his father's background, Stojaković is eligible to represent Serbia internationally, while due to his mother's background, he is eligible to represent Greece. Additionally, as a U.S. citizen and having grown up there, he is eligible to represent the United States.

== Career statistics ==
Legend
GP	Games played	GS	Games started	MPG	Minutes per game
FG%	Field goal percentage	3P%	3-point field goal percentage	FT%	Free throw percentage
RPG	Rebounds per game	APG	Assists per game	SPG	Steals per game
BPG	Blocks per game	PPG	Points per game	**Bold**	Career high

=== College ===
Year	Team	GP	GS	MPG	FG%	3P%	FT%	RPG	APG	SPG	BPG	PPG
2023–24	Stanford	**32**	10	22.3	.409	**.327**	.528	3.4	.9	.4	.1	7.8
2024–25	California	29	**28**	**33.5**	.427	.318	.818	**4.7**	**1.8**	**.8**	**1.2**	**17.9**
2025–26	Illinois	31	21	26.2	**.492**	.241	**.822**	4.5	1.0	.4	.5	13.5
Career		92	59	27.1	.442	.301	.787	4.2	1.2	.5	.6	12.9

== Personal life ==
Stojaković is a son of Serbian former basketball player Peja Stojaković and Greek model, former high jumper, and TV presenter Aleka Kamila. His father was a three-time NBA All-Star with the Sacramento Kings and 2011 NBA champion with the Dallas Mavericks. It has been stated that he is expected to play for the Serbian national team but this has since been clarified as a misunderstanding.

=== Endorsements ===
Stojaković has multiple brand deals with brands such as PAPATUI, NBA 2K, Culver's, State Farm, Venmo, and Raising Cane's.
