= 2026 FIBA U18 AmeriCup =

14th FIBA Under-18 Americas Basketball Championship

Tournament details
- Host country: Mexico
- City: León
- Dates: 1–7 June 2026
- Teams: 8 (from 1 confederation)
- Venue: 1 (in 1 host city)

Final positions
- Champions: Canada (1st title)
- Runners-up: United States
- Third place: Brazil

Tournament statistics
- MVP: (Canada) Javion Tyndale
- Top scorer: (Dominican Republic) Marlon Martinez (19.0)
- Top rebounds: (United States) Quentin Coleman (11.4)
- Top assists: (Canada) Javion Tyndale (6.0)
- PPG (Team): Canada (97.6)
- RPG (Team): Canada (58.8)
- APG (Team): Canada (21.8)

Official website
- www.fiba.basketball

The 2026 FIBA U18 AmeriCup was the 14th edition of the FIBA Under-18 AmeriCup, a biennial international under-18 men's basketball competition. The tournament was held from 1 to 7 June 2026 in León, Mexico. It also served as the FIBA Americas' qualifiers for the 2027 FIBA Under-19 Basketball World Cup, where the top four teams qualified.

== Participating teams ==
- North America:
1. United States
2. Canada
- Central America–Caribbean: (Top three CAC teams in the FIBA Boys' World Ranking)
1. Dominican Republic
2. Puerto Rico
3. Mexico (Hosts)
- South America: (2025 FIBA U17 South American Championship in Asunción, Paraguay, 10–14 December 2025)
1. Brazil
2. Argentina
3. Venezuela

== Preliminary round ==
The draw was held on 4 May 2026 in FIBA Americas Headquarters in Miami, Florida.

All times are local (Zona Centro; UTC-6).

=== Group A ===
Pos	Team	Pld	W	L	PF	PA	PD	Pts	Qualification
1	United States	3	3	0	279	170	+109	6	Semifinals
2	Argentina	3	2	1	208	234	−26	5	Quarterfinals
3	Brazil	3	1	2	248	238	+10	4	Quarterfinals
4	Mexico (H)	3	0	3	183	276	−93	3	5th–8th place semifinals

Source: FIBA
Rules for classification: 1) Points; 2) Head-to-head results; 3) Points difference; 4) Points scored.
(H) Hosts

1 June 2026
17:30

Boxscore

United States	88–58	Argentina
Scoring by quarter: 23–11, 22–15, 18–15, 25–17
Pts: two players 12; Rebs: Quentin Coleman 15; Asts: Taylen Kinney 5		Pts: Santiago Pettinaroli 15; Rebs: two players 4 Asts: two players 3

Domo de la Feria, León
Attendance: 500
Referees: Orlando Varela (HON), Carlos Pallares (COL), Jassmany Milton Choque Galarza (BOL)

1 June 2026
20:00

Boxscore

Brazil	103–70	Mexico
Scoring by quarter: 27–17, 15–19, 35–14, 26–20
Pts: Lucas Moro 21; Rebs: Isaiah Santos 9 Asts: Pietro Melo 6		Pts: Isaiah Barnes 28; Rebs: Isaiah Barnes 7 Asts: Isaiah Barnes 3

Domo de la Feria, León
Attendance: 768
Referees: Julirys Guzman (PUR), Brooke Briscoe (CAN), Winker Mateo (DOM)

2 June 2026
17:30

Boxscore

Argentina	84–83	Brazil
Scoring by quarter: 23–19, 18–25, 18–17, 25–22
Pts: Santiago Pettinaroli 20; Rebs: Lautaro Basualdo 9 Asts: Joaquin Celiz 5		Pts: Isaiah Santos 22; Rebs: Isaiah Santos 15; Asts: two players 4

Domo de la Feria, León
Attendance: 1638
Referees: Andrés Bartel (URU), Julirys Guzman (PUR), Juan David Cantillo Villanueva (COL)

2 June 2026
20:00

Boxscore

Mexico	50–107	United States
Scoring by quarter: 13–29, 12–27, 5–25, 20–26
Pts: Adrien Porras 16; Rebs: Adrien Porras 6 Asts: Isaiah Barnes 4		Pts: Caleb Gaskins 13; Rebs: Bruce Branch III 11; Asts: two players 5

Domo de la Feria, León
Attendance: 2300
Referees: Orlando Varela (HON), Aline García (URU), Brooke Briscoe (CAN)

4 June 2026
15:00

Boxscore

United States	84–62	Brazil
Scoring by quarter: 21–15, 17–21, 21–11, 25–15
Pts: Davion Thompson 16; Rebs: Bruce Branch III 14; Asts: three players 3		Pts: Isaiah Santos 16; Rebs: two players 8 Asts: Pedro Souza 2

Domo de la Feria, León
Attendance: 500
Referees: Aline García (URU), Brooke Briscoe (CAN), Winker Mateo (DOM)

4 June 2026
20:00

Boxscore

Mexico	63–66	Argentina
Scoring by quarter: 17–10, 16–19, 18–20, 12–17
Pts: Isaiah Barnes 19; Rebs: Adrien Porras 14; Asts: Isaiah Barnes 5		Pts: Manuel Hernandez 18; Rebs: Lautaro Basualdo 9 Asts: Joaquin Celiz 4

Domo de la Feria, León
Attendance: 1931
Referees: Roberto Fernandez (CRC), Julirys Guzman (PUR), Carlos Pallares (COL)

=== Group B ===
Pos	Team	Pld	W	L	PF	PA	PD	Pts	Qualification
1	Canada	3	3	0	306	178	+128	6	Semifinals
2	Dominican Republic	3	2	1	253	239	+14	5	Quarterfinals
3	Puerto Rico	3	1	2	197	275	−78	4	Quarterfinals
4	Venezuela	3	0	3	193	257	−64	3	5th–8th place semifinals

Source: FIBA
Rules for classification: 1) Points; 2) Head-to-head results; 3) Points difference; 4) Points scored.

1 June 2026
12:30

Boxscore

Venezuela	51–105	Canada
Scoring by quarter: 13–22, 21–25, 8–30, 9–28
Pts: Jose Lara 9 Rebs: Bryan Gomez 6 Asts: Kevin Gutierrez 3		Pts: Lyris Robinson 19; Rebs: Maxime Meyer 11; Asts: Maxime Meyer 6

Domo de la Feria, León
Attendance: 168
Referees: Aline García (URU), João Varella (BRA), Luis Eecobedo (MEX)

1 June 2026
15:00

Boxscore

Dominican Republic	100–71	Puerto Rico
Scoring by quarter: 26–13, 21–16, 30–22, 23–20
Pts: Antonio Pemberton 21; Rebs: Rayner Montero 10; Asts: Antonio Pemberton 7		Pts: Andrew Rosario 13; Rebs: two players 6 Asts: Gustavo Roca 6

Domo de la Feria, León
Attendance: 200
Referees: Roberto Fernandez (CRC), Romina Belén Morales Ibarra (ARG), Juan David Cantillo Villanueva (COL)

2 June 2026
12:30

Boxscore

Canada	100–79	Dominican Republic
Scoring by quarter: 26–12, 27–29, 19–22, 28–16
Pts: Lyris Robinson 16; Rebs: Maxime Meyer 11; Asts: Javion Tyndale 6		Pts: Rayner Montero 13; Rebs: Marlon Martinez 8 Asts: Marlon Martinez 5

Domo de la Feria, León
Attendance: 180
Referees: Omar Bermudez (MEX), Romina Belén Morales Ibarra (ARG), Jassmany Milton Choque Galarza (BOL)

2 June 2026
15:00

Boxscore

Puerto Rico	78–74	Venezuela
Scoring by quarter: 17–11, 22–22, 15–21, 24–20
Pts: Myles Fuentes 21; Rebs: James Rivera 8 Asts: Myles Fuentes 8		Pts: Samuel Niño 15; Rebs: Samuel Niño 8 Asts: three players 4

Domo de la Feria, León
Attendance: 167
Referees: Roberto Fernandez (CRC), João Varella (BRA), Carlos Pallares (COL)

4 June 2026
12:30

Boxscore

Dominican Republic	74–68	Venezuela
Scoring by quarter: 18–22, 14–8, 23–17, 19–21
Pts: Marlon Martinez 27; Rebs: Enmanuel Valera 11; Asts: Antonio Pemberton 6		Pts: Kevin Gutierrez 25; Rebs: Kevin Gutierrez 8 Asts: Deiker Torres 5

Domo de la Feria, León
Attendance: 320
Referees: Orlando Varela (HON), Romina Belén Morales Ibarra (ARG), Jassmany Milton Choque Galarza (BOL)

4 June 2026
17:30

Boxscore

Canada	101–48	Puerto Rico
Scoring by quarter: 33–12, 16–14, 23–10, 29–12
Pts: Abdul-Malik Olajuwon 15; Rebs: Maxime Meyer 13; Asts: Deng Ngor 9		Pts: Derick Salaberrios 13; Rebs: Andrew Rosario 6 Asts: Lenuel Narvaez 2

Domo de la Feria, León
Attendance: 700
Referees: Luis Eecobedo (MEX), João Varella (BRA), Juan David Cantillo Villanueva (COL)

== Knockout stage ==
=== Bracket ===
Fifth place game
4B	Venezuela	58
2A	Argentina	72
Seventh place game
2B	Dominican Republic	111
4A	Mexico	73

5th–8th place semifinals
4B	Venezuela	80
2B	Dominican Republic	74
4A	Mexico	73
2A	Argentina	87

Quarterfinals
2B	Dominican Republic	96
3A	Brazil	101
2A	Argentina	70
3B	Puerto Rico	73

Semifinals
1A	United States	102
3A	Brazil	56
1B	Canada	115
3B	Puerto Rico	49

Final
1A	United States	65
1B	Canada	67
Third place game
3A	Brazil	83
3B	Puerto Rico	77

=== Quarterfinals ===
5 June 2026
16:30

Boxscore

Argentina	70–73	Puerto Rico
Scoring by quarter: 13–28, 21–12, 14–15, 22–18
Pts: Manuel Hernandez 11; Rebs: Santiage Pettinaroli 11; Asts: Mateo Fessia 6		Pts: Jomar Bernard 18; Rebs: Myles Fuentes 6 Asts: Felipe Quinones 12

Domo de la Feria, León
Attendance: 200
Referees: Omar Bermudez (MEX), Aline García (URU), Carlos Pallares (COL)

5 June 2026
19:00

Boxscore

Dominican Republic	96–101	Brazil
Scoring by quarter: 22–29, 32–24, 17–23, 25–25
Pts: Marlon Martinez 29; Rebs: Luis Valdez 8 Asts: Angel Parreño 5		Pts: Pietro Melo 21; Rebs: Bruno Solano 9 Asts: Pietro Melo 9

Domo de la Feria, León
Attendance: 450
Referees: Andrés Bartel (URU), Roberto Fernandez (CRC), Orlando Varela (HON)

=== 5th–8th place semifinals ===
6 June 2026
14:30

Boxscore

Venezuela	80–74	Dominican Republic
Scoring by quarter: 24–21, 15–18, 22–13, 19–22
Pts: Richard Segovia 15; Rebs: Bryan Gomez 7 Asts: two players 4		Pts: Antonio Pemberton 21; Rebs: Roderi Romero 9 Asts: Antonio Pemberton 4

Domo de la Feria, León
Attendance: 100
Referees: Aline García (URU), João Varella (BRA), Jassmany Milton Choque Galarza (BOL)

6 June 2026
17:00

Boxscore

Mexico	73–87	Argentina
Scoring by quarter: 18–21, 14–24, 26–24, 15–18
Pts: Isaiah Barnes 23; Rebs: Adrien Porras 10; Asts: Yair Olano 3		Pts: Gonzalo Arman 15; Rebs: Benjamin Pettovello 8 Asts: Mateo Fessia 5

Domo de la Feria, León
Attendance: 458
Referees: Julirys Guzman (PUR), Brooke Briscoe (CAN), Juan David Cantillo Villanueva (COL)

=== Semifinals ===
6 June 2026
22:00

Boxscore

United States	102–56	Brazil
Scoring by quarter: 31–14, 19–18, 31–12, 21–12
Pts: Colben Landrew 18; Rebs: Quentin Coleman 10; Asts: two players 5		Pts: Joao Neves 14; Rebs: Joao Neves 8 Asts: Pietro Melo 3

Domo de la Feria, León
Attendance: 800
Referees: Orlando Varela (HON), Carlos Pallares (COL), Romina Belén Morales Ibarra (ARG)

6 June 2026
19:30

Boxscore

Canada	115–49	Puerto Rico
Scoring by quarter: 20–12, 35–9, 28–11, 32–17
Pts: Lyris Robinson 18; Rebs: Stefan Ilic 14; Asts: Javion Tyndale 6		Pts: Derek Pagan 18; Rebs: Derek Pagan 5 Asts: Derek Pagan 6

Domo de la Feria, León
Attendance: 1230
Referees: Roberto Fernandez (CRC), Luis Eecobedo (MEX), Winker Mateo (DOM)

=== Seventh place game ===
7 June 2026
11:30

Boxscore

Dominican Republic	111–73	Mexico
Scoring by quarter: 29–16, 25–17, 33–22, 24–18
Pts: Antonio Pemberton 22; Rebs: Marlon Martinez 10; Asts: Antonio Pemberton, Marlon Martinez 9		Pts: Yair Olano 17; Rebs: Yair Olano 6 Asts: Miguel Ayala, Isaiah Barnes, Maximo Felix, Yair Olano 3

Domo de la Feria, León
Attendance: 235
Referees: Jassmany Milton Choque Galarza (BOL), Romina Belén Morales Ibarra (ARG), Carlos Pallares (COL)

=== Fifth place game ===
7 June 2026
14:00

Boxscore

Venezuela	58–72	Argentina
Scoring by quarter: 11–18, 24–18, 15–18, 8–18
Pts: Williams Anillo, Jose Lara 13; Rebs: Jose Lara 9 Asts: Juan Perdomo, Richard Segovia, Deiker Torres 2		Pts: Manuel Hernandez 15; Rebs: Joaquin Celiz 9 Asts: Gonzalo Aman 6

Domo de la Feria, León
Attendance: 200
Referees: Julirys Guzman (PUR), Juan David Cantillo Villanueva (COL), Winker Mateo (DOM)

=== Third place game ===
7 June 2026
16:30

Boxscore

Brazil	83–77	Puerto Rico
Scoring by quarter: 24-31, 13–25, 28–13, 18–8
Pts: Joao Neves, Pedro Souza 21; Rebs: Michael Pereira 11; Asts: Pietro Melo 6		Pts: Felipe Quinones 16; Rebs: Derick Salaberrios 7 Asts: Felipe Quinones 6

Domo de la Feria, León
Attendance: 1230
Referees: Omar Bermudez (MEX), Roberto Fernandez (CRC), Aline Garcia (URU)

=== Final ===
7 June 2026
19:00

Boxscore

United States	65–67	Canada
Scoring by quarter: 23–20, 12–15, 14–13, 16–19
Pts: Darius Wabbington 11; Rebs: Quentin Coleman 10; Asts: Darius Wabbington 4		Pts: Javion Tyndale 19; Rebs: Godson Okokoh 8 Asts: Javion Tyndale 8

Domo de la Feria, León
Attendance: 2930
Referees: Andrés Bartel (URU), Orlando Varela (HON), João Varella (BRA)

== Statistics and awards ==
=== Awards ===
2026 FIBA U18 AmeriCup winners

Canada
1st title

Most Valuable Player
(Canada) Javion Tyndale

All Tournament Team

- (Canada) Javion Tyndale
- (Canada) Lyris Robinson
- (United States) Quentin Coleman
- (Brazil) Pedro Souza
- (Puerto Rico) Felipe Quiñones

== Final standings ==
Rank	Team	Record
1st place, gold medalist(s)	Canada	5–0
2nd place, silver medalist(s)	United States	4–1
3rd place, bronze medalist(s)	Brazil	3–3
4	Puerto Rico	2–4
5	Argentina	4–2
6	Venezuela	1–4
7	Dominican Republic	3–3
8	Mexico	0–5

Qualified for the 2027 FIBA Under-19 Basketball World Cup
