= Darrell Elston =

American basketball player (born 1952)

Personal information
- Born: August 15, 1952 (age 74) Tipton, Indiana, U.S.
- Listed height: 6 ft 4 in (1.93 m)
- Listed weight: 190 lb (86 kg)

Career information
- High school: Tipton (Tipton, Indiana)
- College: North Carolina (1971–1974)
- NBA draft: 1974: 3rd round, 43rd overall pick
- Drafted by: Atlanta Hawks
- Playing career: 1974–1975
- Position: Shooting guard
- Number: 11, 15

Career history
- 1974–1975: Virginia Squires
- 1977: Indiana Pacers

Career highlights
- Second-team All-ACC (1974)
- Stats at NBA.com
- Stats at Basketball Reference

Darrell Eugene Elston (born August 15, 1952) is an American former professional basketball player. Born in Tipton, Indiana, he was a 6-foot-4-inch (193 cm) 190 pounds (86 kg) guard and played collegiately at the University of North Carolina.

Elston was selected with the 7th pick of the third round in the 1974 NBA draft by the Atlanta Hawks. He was also selected in the fourth round of the 1974 American Basketball Association draft by the Carolina Cougars. He played for the Virginia Squires in 1974–75, playing 72 games and averaging 8.3 points, 2.3 rebounds and 2.8 assists per game. On August 18, 1976, the former ABA's Indiana Pacers signed Elston in their first move since their absorption into the NBA. In 1976–77, Elston played 5 games for the Pacers, averaging 1.0 point, 1.2 rebounds and 0.4 assists per game. He was waived not long after.

His son Derek spent four seasons on the Indiana Hoosiers men's basketball team, including the 2013 Big Ten Championship team. Derek averaged 4.3 points and 2.9 rebounds per game as a Hoosier.
