= Javion Tyndale =

Canadian basketball player (born 2008)

No. 3 – Montverde Academy Eagles
- Position: Guard

Personal information
- Born: August 6, 2008 (age 18)
- Listed height: 5 ft 9 in (1.75 m)
- Listed weight: 160 lb (73 kg)

Career information
- High school: Montverde Academy
- College: Seton Hall (commit)

Career highlights
- FIBA Under-18 AmeriCup MVP (2026)
Medals
Representing the Canada
Men's basketball
FIBA Under-18 AmeriCup
Gold medal – first place	2026 Mexico	Team

Javion Tyndale (born August 6, 2008) is an Canadian high school basketball player who attends Montverde Academy in Montverde, Florida. He is one of the top recruits in the class of 2027 and is committed to playing college basketball for the Seton Hall Pirates.

== Early life ==
Tyndale attends Montverde Academy in Montverde, Florida, where he plays point guard for them. A native of Mississauga, Ontario, Canada, he joined Montverde Academy's varsity team as a sophomore during the 2024–25 season. He was listed at 5 feet 8 inches and played point guard for the Eagles. During his junior season in 2025–26, Tyndale averaged 9.1 points, 2.7 rebounds, 5.3 assists, and 1.3 steals per game for Montverde Academy. The Eagles entered the 2026 postseason with a 21–5 record and won the Nike EYBL Scholastic regular-season championship. Montverde subsequently reached the championship game of the 2026 Chipotle Nationals.

=== Recruiting ===
Tyndale emerged as a highly regarded recruit in the 2027 class during the 2026 offseason. He was initially an unranked recruit with offers from East Carolina and St. Bonaventure, before his recruitment accelerated following his performance at the FIBA Under-18 AmeriCup. He subsequently received offers from several programs, including Bowling Green, Charlotte, Kent State, Ohio, Providence, Richmond, Seton Hall, Stephen F. Austin, UNLV, and West Virginia. ESPN ranked him No. 48 nationally in its SC Next 100 rankings for the 2027 class, while Rivals.com listed him as a four-star prospect.

On September 21, 2026, Tyndale committed to playing college basketball for the Seton Hall Pirates. The commitment made him Seton Hall's first recruit in the 2027 class.

== International career ==
In June 2026, Tyndale represented Canada at the FIBA Under-18 AmeriCup in León, Mexico. He helped Canada win its first gold medal in the competition, defeating the United States 67–65 in the championship game. Tyndale was named tournament MVP and selected to the All-Star Five after averaging 12.6 points, 3.2 rebounds, 6.0 assists, and 2.0 steals per game.
