= Nikola Pavličević =

Montenegrin basketball player

Nikola Pavlićević
No. 4 – Studentski centar
- Position: Point guard
- League: Prva A Liga; ABA League

Personal information
- Born: August 13, 1988 (age 38) Nikšić, SR Montenegro, SFR Yugoslavia
- Listed height: 1.92 m (6 ft 4 in)
- Listed weight: 80 kg (176 lb)

Career information
- NBA draft: 2010: undrafted
- Playing career: 2006–present

Career history
- 2006–2009: Sutjeska
- 2009–2012: Lovćen
- 2012–2013: Sutjeska
- 2013–2014: Hallmann Vienna
- 2014–2016: Sutjeska
- 2016: Union Olimpija
- 2016–2017: Szolnok Olaj
- 2017: MZT Skopje
- 2018–2020: Sutjeska
- 2020–present: Studentski centar

Career highlights
- Montenegrin Cup winner (2024); ABA League Second Division champion (2021)
Medals
Men's basketball
Representing Montenegro
Games of the Small States of Europe
Silver medal – second place	2017 San Marino	Team

Nikola Pavličević (born August 11, 1988) is a Montenegrin professional basketball player for Studentski centar of the Prva A Liga and the ABA League.
