= Tomislav Ivišić =

Croatian basketball player

No. 13 – Illinois Fighting Illini
- Position: Center / power forward
- League: Big Ten Conference

Personal information
- Born: 9 August 2003 (age 23) Vitez, Bosnia and Herzegovina
- Listed height: 7 ft 1 in (2.16 m)
- Listed weight: 255 lb (116 kg)

Career information
- College: Illinois (2024–present)
- Playing career: 2020–present

Career history
- 2019–2020: Šibenka
- 2020–2024: Studentski centar

Career highlights
- Montenegrin Cup winner (2024); ABA League Supercup winner (2023)
Medals
Men's basketball
Representing Croatia
FIBA U16 EuroBasket
Gold medal – first place	2018 Serbia	Team

Tomislav Ivišić is a Croatian college basketball player for the Illinois Fighting Illini of the Big Ten Conference. He represents the Croatia national team internationally.

== College career ==
College recruiting
Name	Hometown	School	Height	Weight	Commit date
Tomislav Ivišić; C	Vodice, Croatia	SC Derby	7 ft 1 in (2.16 m)	230 lb (100 kg)	May 6, 2024
Tomislav Ivišić; C	Recruit ratings: 247Sports:				
Overall recruit ranking: Rivals: 11 247Sports: 10 On3: 20
Note: In many cases, Scout, Rivals, 247Sports, On3, and ESPN may conflict in their listings of height and weight.; In these cases, the average was taken. ESPN grades are on a 100-point scale.; Sources: "2024 Illinois Commits". Rivals.; "ESPN- Illinois Fighting Illini Men's Basketball Recruiting". ESPN.; "2024 Team Ranking". Rivals.; "Tomislav Ivišić". 247Sports.; "Tomislav Ivišić". On3.

=== Sophomore season ===
He joined the Illini for the 2024–25 season. However, due to playing professionally, the NCAA took one year of eligibility from him, effectively treating him as a sophomore. Throughout the season he was plagued by health issues, as he suffered an ankle injury and missed several practices and games due to mononucleosis and the flu. Following the conclusion of the Big Ten regular season, he received an honorable mention from the media for the All-Big Ten awards.

=== Junior season ===
Prior to the start of his junior season, Ivišić underwent a tonsillectomy. He recovered in time to play in the opening game of the season. He later injured his knee in practice and missed the next three games.

== Career statistics ==
Legend
GP	Games played	GS	Games started	MPG	Minutes per game
FG%	Field goal percentage	3P%	3-point field goal percentage	FT%	Free throw percentage
RPG	Rebounds per game	APG	Assists per game	SPG	Steals per game
BPG	Blocks per game	PPG	Points per game	**Bold**	Career high

=== College ===
Year	Team	GP	GS	MPG	FG%	3P%	FT%	RPG	APG	SPG	BPG	PPG
2024–25	Illinois	32	31	26.8	.492	.357	.750	7.7	2.3	0.6	1.2	13.0
2025–26	Illinois	34	33	25.4	.483	.313	.778	5.6	1.6	0.3	0.6	10.4

== Personal life ==
Tomislav's twin brother Zvonimir Ivišić is a college basketball player as well. Over the course of their careers, they have played together at Šibenik in Croatia, at SC Derby in Montenegro, and at Illinois in the United States.
