= Tre White (basketball) =

American basketball player (born 2003)

No. 3 – Kansas Jayhawks
- Position: Shooting guard / small forward
- League: Big 12

Personal information
- Born: January 28, 2003 (age 23) Dallas, Texas, U.S.
- Listed height: 6 ft 7 in (2.01 m)
- Listed weight: 215 lb (98 kg)

Career information
- High school: Prolific Prep (Napa, California)
- College: USC (2022–2023); Louisville (2023–2024); Illinois (2024–2025); Kansas (2025–present)

Career highlights
- Pac-12 All-Freshman Team (2023)

Anthony White III (born January 28, 2003) is an American college basketball player for the Kansas Jayhawks. He previously played for the USC Trojans, Louisville Cardinals, and Illinois Fighting Illini.

== Early life ==
As a senior at Prolific Prep, White averaged 18.2 points, 5.8 rebounds and 4.3 assists per game. He was rated as a four-star recruit and committed to play college basketball for the USC Trojans over other schools such as LSU, Kansas, Illinois, and Oklahoma State.

== College career ==
=== USC ===
As a freshman in 2022-23, White averaged 9.0 points and 5.1 rebounds per game in 26 starts and was named to the Pac-12 Conference all-freshman team. After the season, he entered his name into the NCAA transfer portal.

=== Louisville ===
White transferred to play for the Louisville Cardinals. On January 30, 2024, he notched 29 points and 14 rebounds against Clemson. During the 2023-24 season, White played in 29 games with 26 starts, where he averaged 12.3 points and 5.9 rebounds per game. After the season, he entered his name into the NCAA transfer portal.

=== Illinois ===
White transferred to play for the Illinois Fighting Illini. On December 10, 2024, he posted 23 points and eight rebounds in a victory versus Wisconsin. On January 2, 2025, White notched 20 points, 11 rebounds, and four assists in a win over Oregon. On January 30, he notched eight points and 13 rebounds in a loss to Nebraska. During the 2024-25 season White averaged 10.5 points and 5.5 rebounds per game in 31 starts. After the conclusion of the 2024-25 season, White again entered his name into the NCAA transfer portal.

=== Kansas ===
For the 2025-26 season, White played for the Kansas Jayhawks under Bill Self. On December 7, he recorded a 20 point double-double versus Missouri, which came a few weeks after scoring 20 points against Duke on November 18.

== College statistics ==
Legend
| GP | Games played | GS | Games started | MPG | Minutes per game |
| FG% | Field goal percentage | 3P% | 3-point field goal percentage | FT% | Free throw percentage |
| RPG | Rebounds per game | APG | Assists per game | SPG | Steals per game |
| BPG | Blocks per game | PPG | Points per game | **Bold** | Career high |

=== College ===
| Year | Team | GP | GS | MPG | FG% | 3P% | FT% | RPG | APG | SPG | BPG | PPG |
|---|---|---|---|---|---|---|---|---|---|---|---|---|
| 2022–23 | USC | 33 | 29 | 26.7 | .474 | .265 | .690 | 5.1 | 1.0 | .5 | .3 | 9.0 |
| 2023–24 | Louisville | 29 | 26 | 31.2 | .456 | .299 | .752 | 5.9 | 1.3 | .8 | .4 | 12.3 |
| 2024–25 | Illinois | 32 | 31 | 23.4 | .507 | .329 | .824 | 5.5 | .8 | .4 | .4 | 10.5 |
| 2025–26 | Kansas | 35 | 35 | 31.3 | .450 | .403 | .872 | 6.7 | 1.8 | .6 | .4 | 13.5 |
