= Zvonimir Ivišić =

Croatian basketball player (born 2003)

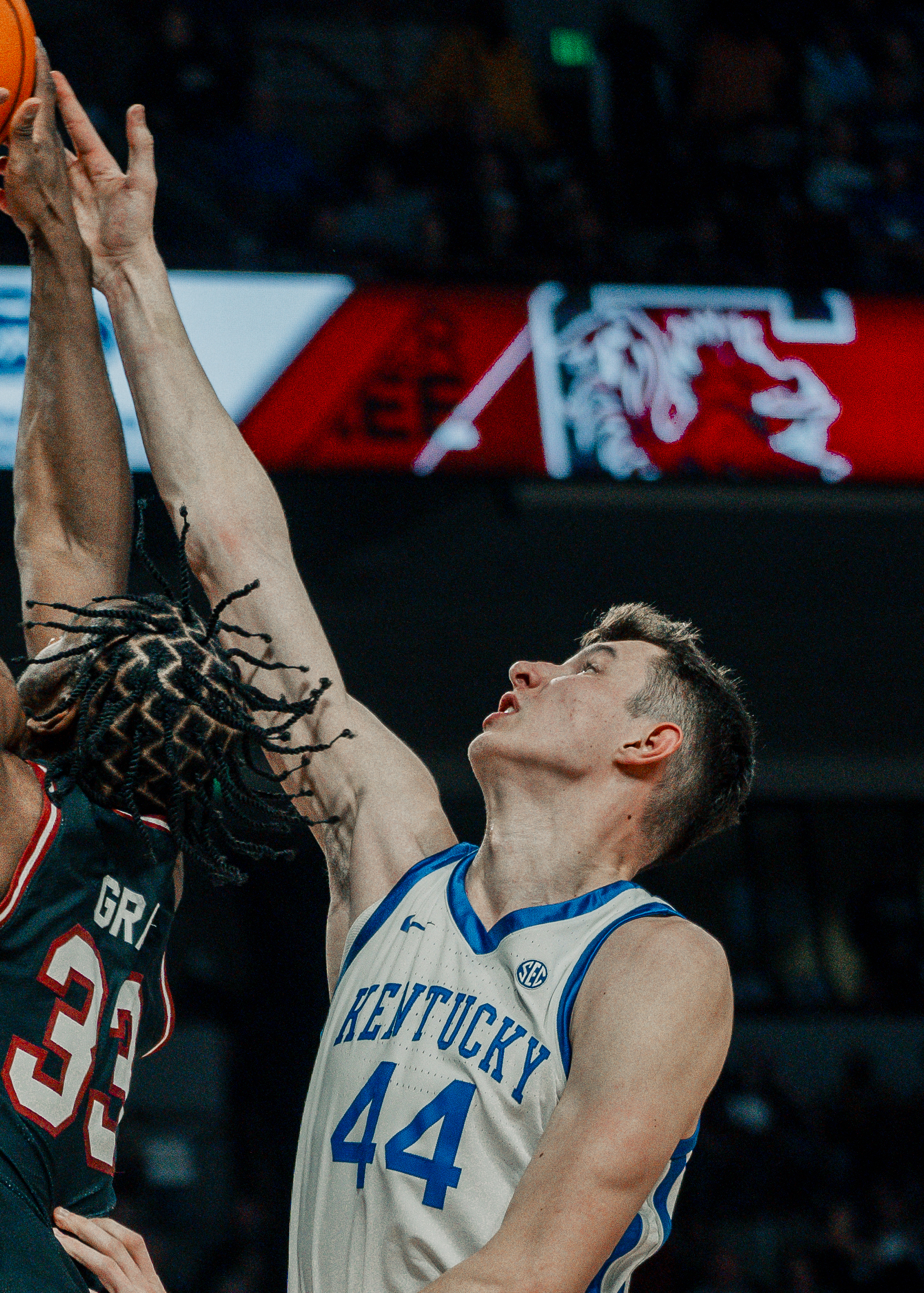
- Ivišić with Kentucky in 2024

No. 44 – Illinois Fighting Illini
- Position: Center / power forward
- League: Big Ten Conference

Personal information
- Born: August 9, 2003 (age 23) Vitez, Bosnia and Herzegovina
- Listed height: 7 ft 2 in (2.18 m)
- Listed weight: 250 lb (113 kg)

Career information
- College: Kentucky (2023–2024); Arkansas (2024–2025); Illinois (2025–present)
- Playing career: 2020–present

Career history
- 2019–2020: Šibenka
- 2021–2023: Studentski centar

Zvonimir Ivišić (born 9 August 2003), nicknamed "Big Z", is a Croatian college basketball player for the Illinois Fighting Illini of the Big Ten Conference. He formerly played for the Arkansas Razorbacks and the Kentucky Wildcats of the Southeastern Conference.

== Early life ==
Ivišić was born in Vitez, Bosnia and Herzegovina and moved to Šibenik, Croatia when he was 14 years old. He played for Studentski centar of the Montenegrin Basketball League and the ABA League from 2020 to 2023. Ivišić declared for the NBA Draft in 2022 and 2023, but ultimately withdrew both times.

== College career ==
=== Kentucky ===
Ivišić committed to play college basketball in the United States for the University of Kentucky. He was not declared eligible to play by the NCAA until halfway into the Wildcats' season. Ivišić made his collegiate debut on January 20, 2024, against Georgia and had 13 points, five rebounds, two assists, three blocks and two steals in 16 minutes played during a 105–96 win. He averaged 5.5 points, 3.3 rebounds, and 1.3 blocks over 15 games played during his freshman season. Ivišić announced he would be entering the NCAA transfer portal shortly after it was reported that Kentucky head coach John Calipari would be leaving the program to become the head coach at Arkansas.

=== Arkansas ===
Ivišić transferred to play at Arkansas, following Calipari.

=== Illinois ===
Following his sophomore season, Ivišić transferred to Illinois.

== National team career ==
Ivišić was named to the Croatia national under-16 basketball team and played in the 2019 FIBA U16 European Championship. He also played for Croatia in the 2023 FIBA U20 European Championship. He averaged 11.4 points, 5.3 rebounds, and 3.4 blocks per game.

== Career statistics ==
Legend
GP	Games played	GS	Games started	MPG	Minutes per game
FG%	Field goal percentage	3P%	3-point field goal percentage	FT%	Free throw percentage
RPG	Rebounds per game	APG	Assists per game	SPG	Steals per game
BPG	Blocks per game	PPG	Points per game	**Bold**	Career high

=== College ===
Year	Team	GP	GS	MPG	FG%	3P%	FT%	RPG	APG	SPG	BPG	PPG
2023–24	Kentucky	15	0	11.7	**.577**	.375	**.773**	3.3	0.6	0.3	1.3	5.5
2024–25	Arkansas	35	**19**	**19.1**	.473	**.376**	.724	4.3	**0.8**	**0.7**	**1.9**	**8.5**
2025–26	Illinois	**37**	4	17.2	.509	.280	.692	**4.5**	0.3	0.2	**1.9**	6.4
**Career**		**87**	**23**	**17.0**	**.499**	**.336**	**.720**	**4.2**	**0.5**	**0.4**	**1.8**	**7.1**

== Personal life ==
Zvonimir's twin brother Tomislav Ivišić is also a former professional basketball player with whom he moved to Šibenik in Croatia from his hometown Vitez in Bosnia and Herzegovina when he was 14 to play for Šibenka. They both moved to Podgorica in Montenegro to play for Studentski centar. Tomislav joined the Illini a year before Zvonimir.
