= Ben Humrichous =

American basketball player (born 2002)

No. 12 – Long Island Nets
- Position: Power forward
- League: NBA G League

Personal information
- Born: July 28, 2002 (age 24) Tipton, Indiana, U.S.
- Listed height: 6 ft 9 in (2.06 m)
- Listed weight: 235 lb (107 kg)

Career information
- High school: Tipton (Tipton, Indiana)
- College: Huntington (2020–2023); Evansville (2023–2024); Illinois (2024–2026)
- NBA draft: 2026: undrafted
- Playing career: 2026–present

Career history
- 2026–present: Long Island Nets

Career highlights
- MVC All-Newcomer team (2024); 2× Second-team All-Crossroads League (2022, 2023)
- Stats at NBA.com
- Stats at Basketball Reference

Ben Humrichous (born July 28, 2002) is an American professional basketball player for the Long Island Nets of the NBA G League. He played college basketball for the Huntington Foresters, Evansville Purple Aces and Illinois Fighting Illini.

== Early life and high school ==
The son of Jason and Jennifer Humrichous, Ben Humrichous grew up in Tipton, Indiana with his 5 siblings and attended Tipton High School. He was named honorable mention All-State as a senior.

== College career ==
Humrichous began his college basketball career at Huntington University, an National Association of Intercollegiate Athletics (NAIA) school in Huntington, Indiana. He was named second-team All-Crossroads League as a sophomore after averaging 11.9 points and 5.9 rebounds per game. Humrichous repeated as a second-team All-Crossroads selection as a junior.

Humrichous transferred to Evansville after his junior season. He missed eight games due to a foot injury in the middle of the season and also was unable to play in the 2024 College Basketball Invitational after re-aggravating the injury. Humrichous was named to the Missouri Valley Conference All-Newcomer team after 14.7 points and 4.7 rebounds per game in his only season with the Purple Aces. After the season, Humrichous entered the NCAA transfer portal.

Humrichous transferred to Illinois for the 2024–25 season. Following the conclusion of the Big Ten regular season, he received the Big Ten Sportsmanship Award.

== Professional career ==
Humrichous went unselected in the 2026 NBA draft. On September 23, 2026, Humrichous signed an Exhibit 10 contract with the Brooklyn Nets.

== Career statistics ==
Legend
GP	Games played	GS	Games started	MPG	Minutes per game
FG%	Field goal percentage	3P%	3-point field goal percentage	FT%	Free throw percentage
RPG	Rebounds per game	APG	Assists per game	SPG	Steals per game
BPG	Blocks per game	PPG	Points per game	**Bold**	Career high

=== College ===
Year	Team	GP	GS	MPG	FG%	3P%	FT%	RPG	APG	SPG	BPG	PPG
2023–24	Evansville	24	24	29.6	.484	.414	.757	4.7	1.9	.7	.9	14.7
2024–25	Illinois	35	26	25.8	.375	.343	.706	3.8	.9	.5	.7	7.6
2025–26	Illinois	37	2	22.5	.383	.361	.792	3.9	.8	.4	.6	5.8

== Personal life ==
Humrichous is a Christian. He is married to Adalia Humrichous.
