= Kylan Boswell =

American basketball player (born 2005)

No. 18 – Charlotte Hornets
- Position: Point guard
- League: NBA

Personal information
- Born: April 18, 2005 (age 21) Champaign, Illinois, U.S.
- Listed height: 6 ft 1 in (1.85 m)
- Listed weight: 200 lb (91 kg)

Career information
- High school: Centennial (Corona, California); AZ Compass Prep (Chandler, Arizona)
- College: Arizona (2022–2024); Illinois (2024–2026)
- NBA draft: 2026: undrafted
- Playing career: 2026–present

Career history
- 2026–present: Charlotte Hornets
- 2026–present: →Greensboro Swarm

Career highlights
- Big Ten All-Defensive team (2026); Pac-12 All-Freshman team (2023)
- Stats at NBA.com
- Stats at Basketball Reference
Medals
Men's basketball
Representing United States
FIBA Under-16 AmeriCup
Gold medal – first place	2021 Mexico	Team

Kylan Cole Boswell (born April 18, 2005) is an American professional basketball player for the Charlotte Hornets of the National Basketball Association (NBA), on a two-way contract with the Greensboro Swarm of the NBA G League. He played college basketball for the Arizona Wildcats and the Illinois Fighting Illini. He also represented the United States at the 2021 FIBA Under-16 Americas Championship and 2023 FIBA Under-19 Basketball World Cup.

== Early life and education ==
He was born to Brandon and Ashley Boswell in Champaign, Illinois. He is of African-American and Samoan heritage. Boswell attended Bottenfield Elementary and Edison Middle School in Champaign before transferring to Urbana Middle School, leading the Tigers to a state finals appearance. Following this, he departed for high school in California.

Boswell attended Centennial High School in Corona, California, where he led the basketball team to a CIF Southern Section title. He subsequently transferred to AZ Compass Prep in Chandler, Arizona, for his junior year. Boswell helped the Dragons reach the GEICO Nationals in Fort Myers, Florida, where they were upset by Montverde Academy 72–63 in the opening round.

== College career ==
=== Arizona (2022-24) ===
Boswell reclassified as a high school student, forgoing his senior year of high school. As the youngest player in college basketball in 2022, Boswell completed his freshman year at 17.

In March 2023, Boswell was named Pac-12 Freshman of the Week.

=== Illinois (2024-26) ===
After two years at Arizona, Boswell transferred to Illinois.

In January 2026, Boswell broke his shooting hand in practice and missed the next seven games before returning to play against Indiana University on February 15th.

== Professional career ==
After going undrafted in the 2026 NBA draft, Boswell signed a two-way contract with the Charlotte Hornets on June 25, 2026.

== Career statistics ==
Legend
GP	Games played	GS	Games started	MPG	Minutes per game
FG%	Field goal percentage	3P%	3-point field goal percentage	FT%	Free throw percentage
RPG	Rebounds per game	APG	Assists per game	SPG	Steals per game
BPG	Blocks per game	PPG	Points per game	**Bold**	Career high

=== College ===
Year	Team	GP	GS	MPG	FG%	3P%	FT%	RPG	APG	SPG	BPG	PPG
2022–23	Arizona	35	0	15.2	.450	.390	.789	1.6	1.6	.7	0.0	4.6
2023–24	Arizona	36	**35**	27.0	.396	.379	**.795**	2.3	**3.6**	**1.4**	0.1	9.6
2024–25	Illinois	35	34	**31.0**	.427	.245	.790	**4.8**	3.4	1.1	**0.3**	**12.3**
2025–26	Illinois	30	30	30.1	**.444**	.307	.781	4.0	3.0	.7	0.0	12.3
Career		136	99	25.7	.425	.327	.787	3.1	2.9	1.0	0.1	9.6

== National team career ==
Boswell joined the 12-player roster for the 2021 FIBA Americas U16 Championship in August 2021. He led the US to a 6–0 record and the gold medal with averages of 9.2 points, 3.7 rebounds, and 4.5 assists per game.

In June 2023, Boswell joined the 12-player roster for the FIBA Under-19 World Cup. In the semifinal, he contributed 11 points and five steals, but the USA suffered a historic 89–86 loss to France.
