= Quentin Coleman =

American basketball player (born 2008)

No. 11 – Illinois Fighting Illini
- Position: Shooting guard
- Conference: Big Ten Conference

Personal information
- Born: July 28, 2008 (age 18)
- Listed height: 6 ft 4 in (1.93 m)
- Listed weight: 180 lb (82 kg)

Career information
- High school: O'Fallon Township (O'Fallon, Illinois); Principia School (Town and Country, Missouri)
- College: Illinois (2026–present)

Career highlights
- Jordan Brand Classic (2026); Mr. Show-Me Basketball (2026)
Medals
Men's basketball
Representing United States
FIBA Under-18 AmeriCup
Silver medal – second place	2026 Mexico	Team

Quentin Coleman (born July 28, 2008) is an American college basketball player for the Illinois Fighting Illini of the Big Ten Conference.

== Early life ==
Coleman initially attended O'Fallon Township High School in O'Fallon, Illinois, where he failed to make the varsity basketball team as a freshman. He then transferred to Principia School in Town and Country, Missouri, where he averaged 10.3 points per game as a sophomore in a sixth man role. Coleman broke out in his final two seasons, earning back-to-back Missouri Class AAA Player of the Year honors after leading his team to consecutive Class AAA state championship titles. As a junior, Coleman averaged 19.4 points per game, leading Principia to a 31–1 record and its first-ever state title. He scored 30 points and grabbed nine rebounds in a 76–56 win over Kipp KC Legacy High School in the state title game.

As a senior, Coleman averaged 23.1 points, 6.1 rebounds, 3.9 assists, and 2.7 steals per game, leading his team to a 29–2 record and their second straight state title. He tallied 50 points, eight rebounds, seven steals, and three assists in a 98–34 blowout win over Miller Career Academy in the state title game. Coleman captured the Mr. Show-Me Basketball award, and was named the Missouri Gatorade Player of the Year, MaxPreps Missouri Player of the Year, Sports Illustrated Missouri Player of the Year, St. Louis American Player of the Year, and St. Louis Post-Dispatch All-Metro Player of the Year. He was also named a first- and second-team All-American by MaxPreps and Naismith, respectively. Coleman was selected to play in the Jordan Brand Classic, where he scored 12 points. He was also named the MVP of the Iverson Classic after recording 31 points and 12 rebounds.

Outside of school, Coleman played with SW Illinois Jets on the Nike Elite Youth Champions League (EYCL) circuit in 2024. The following year, he played with Bradley Beal Elite on the Nike Elite Youth Basketball League (EYBL) circuit, helping them win the 17U Peach Jam championship after recording 14 points, seven rebounds, and five assists in a 75–55 win over the New York Rens the championship game.

=== Recruiting ===
Coleman was a consensus top-25 prospect and one of the top recruits in the class of 2026. He was rated a five-star recruit by 247Sports and Rivals.com, and a four-star recruit by ESPN. Ahead of his senior year, Coleman was ranked as the 173rd recruit in his class by 247Sports. However, over the course of the season, he emerged "as one of the top guard recruits in the nation", and he jumped from the No. 35 to No. 13 recruit in his class in the final 247Sports update.

On October 14, 2025, Coleman committed to playing college basketball at Wake Forest over offers from Iowa, Saint Louis, and Texas Tech, after having visited all four schools. He signed with Wake Forest the following month. However, he was granted a release from his National Letter of Intent in March 2026, reopening his recruitment process. On April 3, Coleman committed to Illinois. He signed with the Fighting Illini the following month.

== National team career ==
Coleman won a silver medal with the United States at the 2026 FIBA U18 AmeriCup in Mexico. He earned tournament all-star five honors after he averaged 11.2 points and a tournament-leading 11.4 rebounds per game.

== Personal life ==
Coleman's father, Bobby, was a standout basketball player at Lebanon High School in Illinois. His younger sister, Josslyn, also plays basketball.

Coleman is from O'Fallon, Illinois.
