= Orlando Antigua =

Dominican basketball player and college coach

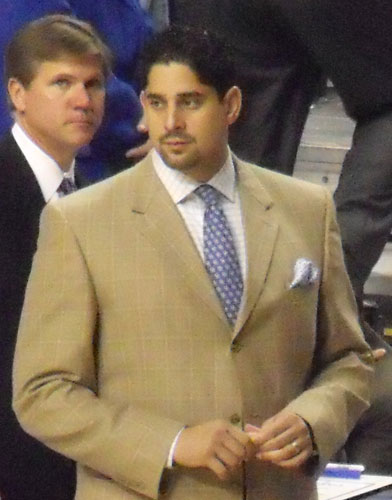

Current position
- Title: Associate head coach
- Team: Illinois
- Conference: Big Ten
- Annual salary: $900,000

Biographical details
- Born: February 20, 1973 (age 53); Dominican Republic
- Education: Pittsburgh

Playing career
- 1989, 1991–1993: Gigantes de Carolina
- 1991–1995: Pittsburgh
- 1995–2002: Harlem Globetrotters
- 1996–1997: Gigantes de Carolina
- 2000: Mets de Guaynabo
- Position: Forward

Coaching career (HC unless noted)
- 2002–2003: Mt. Lebanon HS (asst.)
- 2006–2008: Pittsburgh (asst.)
- 2008–2009: Memphis (asst.)
- 2009–2014: Kentucky (asst.)
- 2013–2015: Dominican Republic
- 2014–2017: South Florida
- 2017–2021: Illinois (asst.)
- 2021–2024: Kentucky (asst.)
- 2024–present: Illinois (assoc. HC)

Administrative career (AD unless noted)
- 2003–2006: Pittsburgh (dir. of ops.)

Head coaching record
- Overall: 23–55 (.295)

Accomplishments and honors

Awards
- USBWA Most Courageous Award (1994)

Orlando Radhames Antigua Fernández (born February 20, 1973), nicknamed "Hurricane", is a Dominican-American basketball coach and former player who is currently the associate head coach at University of Illinois Urbana-Champaign. He was also an assistant there from 2017 to 2021.

Antigua was previously an assistant coach under John Calipari at the University of Kentucky. He is widely known as becoming the first Hispanic and the first non-black player for the Harlem Globetrotters in 52 years when he signed in 1995. After his retirement from playing professional basketball he was named an assistant coach at Pittsburgh, the University of Memphis, and the University of Kentucky. In 2014, he was named the head coach at South Florida, which he held until 2017. He also served as the head coach of the Dominican Republic national basketball team from 2013 to 2015.

== Early years ==
Antigua was born in the Dominican Republic to a Dominican father and Puerto Rican mother. The family moved to New York City and lived in the Bronx where he was raised. There Antigua and his two siblings received their primary and secondary education. He attended St. Raymond's High School, where he played basketball.

On Halloween night in 1988, Antigua became the victim of a drive-by shooting and was shot in the head near his left eye. He recovered from the shooting, although the doctors were unable to extract the bullet until a later time. He was back playing basketball just two months after the incident and gained media attention as the kid who'd taken a bullet to the head in a drive-by in his rough Bronx neighborhood. During this period of his life Antigua's family also went through a period of homelessness. He kept the family together while housing was secured.

He overcame these difficulties and went on to serve as student council president at his high school and played a major role in the program's New York Catholic League Championship run under head coach Gary DeCesare. As a senior, he earned All-New York City and Parade All America Second Team honors. Antigua also played on the Gauchos youth basketball team. He caught the attention of various scouts during his high school playing days and was signed with the University of Pittsburgh.

== Pittsburgh Panthers ==
From 1991 to 1995 Antigua played basketball for the University of Pittsburgh Panthers basketball team. Antigua's performance during his freshman (Big East All-Rookie Team) and sophomore years under coach Paul Evans contributed to an appearance in the NIT (National Invitation Tournament) second round, and an NCAA tournament berth the season after. Antigua was named the recipient of the United States Basketball Writers' Association (USBWA) Most Courageous Award in 1994, an honor presented annually to an individual associated with college basketball who displays exceptional courage both on and off the floor. As a member of the Panthers, Antigua ranks 11th all-time in career 3-pointers made (117) and sixth in career 3-point field goal percentage (.386). He also ranks among the school's career leaders in blocked shots with 78, the 12th best total in Panthers history.

== Basketball in Puerto Rico and the Dominican Republic ==
Antigua was able to play basketball in the Puerto Rican and Dominican basketball leagues because of his parents' Puerto Rican and Dominican roots. During his college years he would spend summers from 1991 to 1993 playing for the Gigantes de Carolina (Carolina Giants), a team in the Baloncesto Superior Nacional (BSN). Antigua averaged 7.5 points and 4.5 rebounds in 1991, 10.4 points and 3.7 rebounds in 1992, and 8.7 points and 4.4 rebounds in 1993.

Antigua continued to play for Carolina in 1996 and 1997 and averaged a career-high 16.8 points in 1997. He ended his professional playing career in 2002 with Mets de Guaynabo.

In 1998, Antigua played for the Dominican Republic national team, which came close to representing the country in the Olympics and World championships for the first time in the history of its program. The team, however fell short in the qualifications. Among his teammates were fellow BSN player Franklyn Western, of the Vaqueros de Bayamón (Bayamon Cowboys) and NBA player Felipe López.

== Harlem Globetrotters ==
In December 1995, Antigua graduated from the University of Pittsburgh with a degree in social sciences. He received offers from various NBA teams to attend their camps and also received offers from European scouts, but instead he decided to sign a deal to play for the world-renowned Harlem Globetrotters. Antigua, thus became the first Hispanic and the first non-black player on the Globetrotters' roster since Bob Karstens played with the squad in 1942–43. He made his debut as a Globetrotter in Pittsburgh and was nicknamed "Hurricane" because of his dazzling moves and quickness.

During the seven years in which he played with the Globetrotters, he represented the squad in 49 different countries and on tours to South America, South Africa and on the acclaimed "Youth in Our Lives Tour." Antigua met many people such as Muhammad Ali, Michael Jordan and Magic Johnson. He did commercials and showed his skills on the Late Show with David Letterman and in Regis and Kathy Lee. According to Antigua, he rates meeting Nelson Mandela in South Africa as his favorite moment. He retired from the Globetrotters in February 2002.

== Coaching career ==
From 2002 to 2003, Antigua served as an assistant basketball coach at Mt. Lebanon High School under Joey David and worked as a sales representative for Cavanaugh Promotions in the North Hills. In 2003, Antigua returned to University of Pittsburgh men's basketball as the director of operations under head coach Jamie Dixon, and on June 7, 2006, was named an assistant coach.

In 2008, Antigua was hired as an assistant coach for the University of Memphis men's basketball program where he joined head coach John Calipari's staff. He then followed Calipari to the University of Kentucky to take an assistant job there.

On March 31, 2014, Antigua was named the new head coach of the South Florida Bulls. He left Kentucky's staff at the conclusion of the 2014 NCAA Tournament. He was also the head coach of the Dominican Republic national basketball team from 2013 to 2015. On January 3, 2017, USF dismissed Antigua as their head coach.

On April 5, 2017, Antigua was added to Brad Underwood's staff at Illinois. On May 6, 2021, it was announced that Antigua and fellow Illinois assistant coach Ronald Coleman were joining the Kentucky coaching staff. After Calipari left Kentucky in 2024, Antigua returned to Illinois as associate head coach.

== Awards and recognitions ==
Among the many awards and recognitions which Antigua has received are the following:

- 1991–95 Named the United States Basketball Writers' Association Most Courageous Athlete award recipient
- Named to Big East All-Rookie Team after the 1991–92 season; started in 78 games, averaged 8.0 points and 3.5 rebounds in 116 career games from 1991 to 1995; concluded career as one of Pittsburgh's best all-time three-point shooters (.386- 117–303).
- Named one of the nation's top-100 most influential Hispanic Americans by Hispanic Business magazine.

== Head coaching record ==
Record table
Season	Team	Overall	Conference	Standing	Postseason
South Florida Bulls (American Athletic Conference) (2014–2017)
2014–15	South Florida	9–23	3–15	11th	
2015–16	South Florida	8–25	4–14	T–9th	
2016–17	South Florida	6–7	0–2	(fired)	
South Florida:		23–55 (.295)	7–30 (.189)		
Total:		23–55 (.295)			

== See also ==
- List of Puerto Ricans
- List of people from the Dominican Republic
