= Keaton Wagler =

American basketball player (born 2007)

- Wagler with the Illinois Fighting Illini in 2026

No. 1 – Los Angeles Clippers
- Position: Shooting guard / point guard
- League: NBA

Personal information
- Born: February 3, 2007 (age 19) Shawnee, Kansas, U.S.
- Listed height: 6 ft 6 in (1.98 m)
- Listed weight: 175 lb (79 kg)

Career information
- High school: Shawnee Mission Northwest (Shawnee, Kansas)
- College: Illinois (2025–2026)
- NBA draft: 2026: 1st round, 5th overall pick
- Drafted by: Los Angeles Clippers
- Playing career: 2026–present

Career history
- 2026–present: Los Angeles Clippers

Career highlights
- Consensus second-team All-American (2026); Jerry West Award (2026); First-team All-Big Ten (2026); Big Ten Freshman of the Year (2026); Big Ten All-Freshman Team (2026)
- Stats at NBA.com
- Stats at Basketball Reference

Keaton Reece Wagler (born February 3, 2007) is an American basketball player for the Los Angeles Clippers of the National Basketball Association (NBA). He played college basketball for the Illinois Fighting Illini leading them to a Final Four appearance. He was selected by the Clippers with the fifth overall pick in the 2026 NBA draft.

== Early life and high school ==
Wagler was born to Logan and Jennifer Wagler, both of whom played basketball for Hutchinson Community College, known affectionately as "Hutch". His basketball roots run even deeper. One of his great-grandfathers, one of his grandfathers, an uncle, and his older brother Landon all played at Hutch. The great-grandfather went on to play at TCU and later ran the national junior-college men's tournament, and the uncle won a national title while playing for Hutch. Also, his older sister Brooklyn was part of a junior college national championship team at Kansas City Kansas Community College before playing at MidAmerica Nazarene University, and Landon also went on to play at MidAmerica Nazarene.

Wagler attended Shawnee Mission Northwest High School in Shawnee, Kansas. Coming out of high school, he was rated as a four-star recruit. At the time his career high was a 32-point game versus Chaminade (MO) in Quincy, Illinois, which he later shattered scoring 46 points against Purdue. He received offers from schools such as UT–Rio Grande Valley, LeMoyne, Northern Colorado, Murray State, Oral Roberts, UIC, DePaul, Southern Illinois, Saint Louis, Colorado State, Illinois and Tulsa. Ultimately, Wagler committed to play college basketball for the Illinois Fighting Illini.

== College career ==
In his debut on November 3, 2025, Wagler totaled 18 points, six rebounds, four assists and two steals in a win versus Jackson State. On December 6, he recorded 16 points, eight rebounds and five assists, with zero turnovers in a win over Tennessee. On December 9, Wagler scored 23 points in a victory against Ohio State. On December 13, he recorded his first career double-double with 19 points and 10 assists in a 83–80 loss to Nebraska.

On January 24, 2026, Wagler recorded 46 points at Purdue, setting a new record for an Illinois freshman in a single game. This also tied Andy Kaufmann's 46 points on December 3, 1990 for the second-most points in a single game for Illinois. Wagler was considered a potential lottery pick in the 2026 NBA draft. The performance represented the most points by a Big Ten basketball player ever scored against an AP poll top-five opponent and the most points ever scored in a road win against a top-ten opponent. The performance also broke a 58-year-old record for points scored by an opponent at Mackey Arena, broke the school single-game record with nine made three-point shots and was the most in a Big Ten road game since Mike Woodson posted 48 in 1979.

== Professional career ==
On June 23, 2026, Wagler was selected fifth overall by the Los Angeles Clippers in the 2026 NBA draft. The Clippers acquired this pick along with Isaiah Jackson, Bennedict Mathurin, and a 2029 1st round pick as part of a trade package that sent Ivica Zubac and Kobe Brown to the Indiana Pacers.

== Career statistics ==
Legend
GP	Games played	GS	Games started	MPG	Minutes per game
FG%	Field goal percentage	3P%	3-point field goal percentage	FT%	Free throw percentage
RPG	Rebounds per game	APG	Assists per game	SPG	Steals per game
BPG	Blocks per game	PPG	Points per game	**Bold**	Career high

=== College ===
Year	Team	GP	GS	MPG	FG%	3P%	FT%	RPG	APG	SPG	BPG	PPG
2025–26	Illinois	37	37	33.9	.445	.397	.796	5.1	4.2	.9	.4	17.9
