= Brad Underwood =

American basketball coach (born 1963)

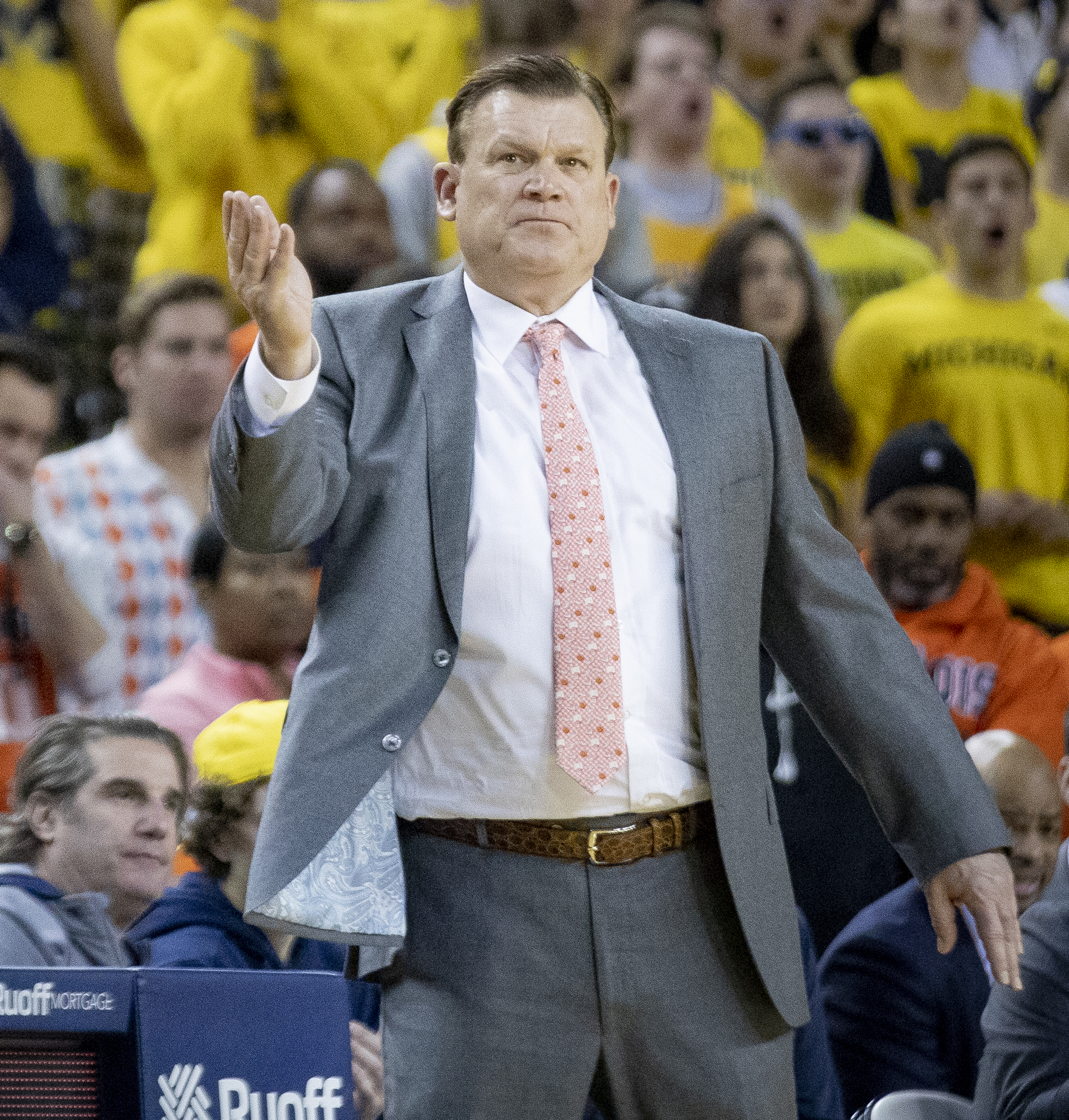
- Underwood coaching in 2020

Current position
- Title: Head coach
- Team: Illinois
- Conference: Big Ten
- Record: 198–111 (.641)
- Annual salary: $4.4 million

Biographical details
- Born: December 14, 1963 (age 62); McPherson, Kansas, U.S.
- Education: Kansas State

Playing career
- 1982–1983: Hardin–Simmons
- 1983–1984: Independence CC
- 1984–1986: Kansas State
- Position: Guard

Coaching career (HC unless noted)
- 1986–1987: Hardin–Simmons (GA)
- 1988–1992: Dodge City CC
- 1992–2003: Western Illinois (assistant)
- 2003–2006: Daytona Beach CC
- 2006–2011: Kansas State (assistant)
- 2011–2012: Kansas State (associate HC)
- 2012–2013: South Carolina (associate HC)
- 2013–2016: Stephen F. Austin
- 2016–2017: Oklahoma State
- 2017–present: Illinois

Head coaching record
- Overall: 307–138 (.690) (NCAA); 132–85 (.608) (NJCAA)
- Tournaments: 12-10 (NCAA Division I)

Accomplishments and honors

Championships
- NCAA Division I regional – Final Four (2026); 3 Southland tournament (2014–2016); 3 Southland regular season (2014–2016); 2 Big Ten tournament (2021, 2024); Big Ten regular season (2022)

Awards
- 3× Southland Coach of the Year (2014–2016); Joe B. Hall Coach of the Year (2014); Coaches vs. Cancer Champion Award (2023)

Bradley Cole Underwood (born December 14, 1963) an American college basketball coach, currently the Fighting Illini men's basketball head coach at the University of Illinois since 2017. Underwood previously served as a head coach at Oklahoma State University, Stephen F. Austin State University, Dodge City Community College, and Daytona Beach Community College.

== Playing career ==
Underwood played as a guard for Hardin-Simmons University during his freshman year from 1982 to 1983 and later transferred to Independence Community College. During his sophomore year, Underwood averaged 17 points a game and led Independence to a second place finish in the 1984 NJCAA Men's Division I Basketball Championship game. As a sophomore at Independence, Underwood took a recruiting visit to Oklahoma State University where Bill Self, then an Oklahoma State basketball player, was his host. Days later, Underwood decided to attend Kansas State University, where he would play under head coach Jack Hartman.

== Early coaching career ==
Underwood began his coaching career as a graduate assistant at Hardin-Simmons during the 1986–87 campaign. He continued his coaching career as the head coach of Dodge City Community College, where he led the Conquistadors to a 62–60 record from 1988 to 1993. In 1993, he joined Jim Kerwin's staff at Western Illinois, with whom he spent 10 years as an assistant. He led Daytona Beach Community College to a 70–24 record from 2003 to 2006 and was twice named the Mid-Florida Conference Coach of the year. He served as assistant coach under Bob Huggins and Frank Martin at Kansas State from 2006 to 2012. In 2012, Martin left to become head coach at South Carolina, and Underwood followed him to Columbia as his associate head coach.

== Head coaching career ==
=== Stephen F. Austin ===
On April 30, 2013, Underwood was hired as head coach of Stephen F. Austin. He replaced Danny Kaspar, who left after 13 seasons to become the head coach of Texas State. According to athletic director Robert Hill, "Brad Underwood brings years of experience to SFA and has coached at the highest levels of Division I basketball. All of this plus his knowledge of the game and ability to recruit makes him the perfect hire for our men's basketball program. He has great plans on how we can make this program even better."

In his first season at the helm, Stephen F. Austin captured the Southland Conference regular-season championship going a perfect 18–0 in conference play. He was named Southland Coach of the Year. SFA was awarded the Southland Conference automatic berth to the 2014 NCAA Division I men's basketball tournament where they upset VCU in the round of 64, before eventually falling to UCLA.

Underwood's third season saw him win the Southland Conference tournament again and an automatic bid to the NCAA tournament as a 14 seed. He then led the Lumberjacks to an upset victory over the third-seeded West Virginia Mountaineers coached by Bob Huggins, with whom he worked as an assistant at Kansas State. Stephen F. Austin had a 75–70 lead over sixth-seeded Notre Dame with two minutes to play in the second round before the Irish scored six straight points and won on a tip-in with 1.2 seconds left.

=== Oklahoma State ===
On March 21, 2016, Underwood was hired as head coach of Oklahoma State. He replaced Travis Ford, who was fired after a 12–20 regular-season record. He led the Cowboys to a 20–13 record in his only season as head coach, ending with a loss to Michigan on March 17, 2017, in the NCAA tournament. In 2020, Oklahoma State's basketball program received penalties from the NCAA—including a ban on postseason play in 2020–21—as punishment for violations committed during Underwood's tenure.

=== University of Illinois ===
On March 18, 2017, Underwood was hired as head coach of Illinois, replacing John Groce. Underwood signed a six-year contract through 2023 worth $18 million that includes two retention bonuses. On March 2, 2020 it was announced that Underwood and his assistants had received extensions. Underwood's contract was extended through the 2025-26 season and moved his base salary to $3.4 million, which ranks in the upper quartile of the Big Ten Conference.

Illinois finished the 2020–21 regular season 16–4 in Big Ten play and 23–6 overall. Illinois finished in second place in the Big Ten to Michigan, who finished with a higher winning percentage at 14–3. In the Big Ten tournament, Illinois first played Rutgers, winning 90–68. Illinois moved on to the semifinals against Iowa, winning 82–71. In the finals, Illinois beat Ohio State, 91–88 in overtime. Underwood led the Illini to their first Big Ten tournament title since 2005. Illinois secured a number one seed in the Midwest region of the 2021 NCAA men's basketball tournament. Their first matchup was against 16 seed Drexel; the Fighting Illini defeated the Drexel Dragons 78–49. In their second matchup, the Illini fell to the 8th-seeded Loyola (Chicago) Ramblers, 71–58. Following the end of the season, Underwood received a one-year contract extension, keeping him through 2027.

The following season (2021–22), the Illini were co-champions of the Big Ten with a 15–5 record. Illinois again made the NCAA Tournament where they beat Chattanooga in the first round before losing to Houston in the second round. Following the end of the season, Underwood received a one-year contract extension, keeping him through 2028.

In the 2022-23 season, the Illini again made the NCAA Tournament, where they lost in the first round to Arkansas.

The Illini had one of their best seasons in history in 2023–24. With a 14–6 record, the Illini finished second in the Big Ten and proceeded to win the Big Ten Tournament against Wisconsin. Winning the Big Ten Tournament triggered an automatic contract extension, keeping Underwood under contract through the 2029-30 season. Following this, the Illini made the NCAA Tournament as a 3 seed and went on to beat Morehead State, Duquesne, and Iowa State before losing to eventual champion Connecticut.

In the 2024–25 season, the Illini again qualified for the NCAA Tournament, beating Xavier in the first round before losing to Kentucky. Following the end of the season, Underwood received a contract extension, with his contract now running through the 2030–31 season.

For the 2025–26 season, the Illini qualified for the NCAA Tournament as a 3 seed, defeating Penn, VCU, Houston, and Iowa in the South Regional to return to the Final Four for the first time since the 2005 season.

== Head coaching record ==
=== NJCAA ===
Record table
Season	Team	Overall	Conference	Standing	Postseason
Dodge City Conquistadors () (1988–1992)
Dodge City CC:		62–60 (.508)			
Daytona Beach Falcons (Mid-Florida Conference) (2003–2006)
2003–04	Daytona Beach	21–9			
2004–05	Daytona Beach	24–10			
2005–06	Daytona Beach	25–6			
Daytona Beach:		70–25 (.737)			
Total:		132–85 (.608)			
National champion Postseason invitational champion Conference regular season champion Conference regular season and conference tournament champion Division regular season champion Division regular season and conference tournament champion Conference tournament champion

=== NCAA ===
Record table
Season	Team	Overall	Conference	Standing	Postseason
Stephen F. Austin Lumberjacks (Southland Conference) (2013–2016)
2013–14	Stephen F. Austin	32–3	18–0	1st	NCAA Division I Round of 32
2014–15	Stephen F. Austin	29–5*	17–1*	1st *	NCAA Division I Round of 64*
2015–16	Stephen F. Austin	28–6*	18–0*	1st *	NCAA Division I Round of 32*
Stephen F. Austin:		89–14 (.864)*	53–1 (.981)*		
Oklahoma State Cowboys (Big 12 Conference) (2016–2017)
2016–17	Oklahoma State	20–13	9–9	5th	NCAA Division I Round of 64
Oklahoma State:		20–13 (.606)	9–9 (.500)		
Illinois Fighting Illini (Big Ten Conference) (2017–present)
2017–18	Illinois	14–18	4–14	T–11th	
2018–19	Illinois	12–21	7–13	T–10th	
2019–20	Illinois	21–10	13–7	4th	Postseason canceled
2020–21	Illinois	24–7	16–4	2nd	NCAA Division I Round of 32
2021–22	Illinois	23–10	15–5	T–1st	NCAA Division I Round of 32
2022–23	Illinois	20–13	11–9	T–5th	NCAA Division I Round of 64
2023–24	Illinois	29–9	14–6	2nd	NCAA Division I Elite Eight
2024–25	Illinois	22–13	12–8	T–7th	NCAA Division I Round of 32
2025–26	Illinois	28–9	15–5	T–2nd	NCAA Division I Final Four
2026–27	Illinois	5–1	0–0		
Illinois:		198–111 (.641)	107–71 (.601)		
Total:		307–138 (.690)**			
National champion Postseason invitational champion Conference regular season champion Conference regular season and conference tournament champion Division regular season champion Division regular season and conference tournament champion Conference tournament champion

* ^^{a} ^{b} ^{c} ^{d} ^{e} In the spring of 2019, the Stephen F. Austin athletics department discovered that the process by which student-athletes were being certified as academically eligible was not properly accounting for all NCAA requirements from 2013 thru 2019. This error resulted in 82 student-athletes competing while ineligible for SFA in the sports of football, men's basketball, baseball, volleyball, softball, women's golf, men's and women's track & field and men's cross country. As a result, Stephen F. Austin vacated 117 men's basketball victories from 2014 thru 2019 including all 29 wins during the 2014-2015 basketball season and all 28 wins during the 2015-2016 basketball season.

== Personal life ==
A native of McPherson, Kansas, Underwood attended Kansas State University and lettered on the basketball team between 1984 and 1986. He graduated from Kansas State with a bachelor's degree in radio and television communications in 1986. He is married to Susan Underwood and has three children: Tyler, Katie, and Ashley.

Tyler played at Stephen F. Austin during the 2015–16 season which he redshirted. He then transferred to Oklahoma State for the 2016–17 season. He then transferred to the University of Illinois from 2017–21. As a senior he played in seven games on the season after making his debut Jan. 7 at Northwestern, made a 3-pointer and had 1 rebound in Big Ten tournament win over Rutgers, grabbed one rebound in win at No. 2 Michigan, and made first basket of the season in Nebraska win. Tyler is currently on staff with his dad at the University of Illinois.

Underwood has served on the Coaches Council of Coaches vs. Cancer throughout his career and was awarded the Coaches vs. Cancer Champion Award in 2023. He hosts an annual fundraiser called "Kickin' Cancer" at Gordyville USA, a horse show arena in Gifford, Illinois. Underwood became the Council Chair in 2024.
