= KK Studentski centar =

Montenegrin professional basketball club

SC Derby
- Nickname: Studenti (Students)
- Leagues: Prva A Liga; ABA League
- Founded: 1997; 29 years ago
- History: KK Studentski centar (1997–present)
- Arena: Morača
- Capacity: 6,000
- Location: Podgorica, Montenegro
- Team colors: Red and white
- Main sponsor: Derby
- President: Zoran Kojičić
- General manager: Đuro Ostojić
- Head coach: Petar Mijović
- Ownership: Dom učenika i studenata Podgorica
- Championships: 1 ABA League Supercup; 1 ABA 2nd League
- Website: scderby.me
Home	Away

Košarkaški klub Studentski centar (Abbr. KK Studentski centar), commonly referred to as Studentski centar, or SC Derby due to sponsorship reasons, is a men's professional basketball club based in Podgorica, Montenegro. The club currently competes in the Montenegrin Basketball League and the ABA League.

SC Derby has won one ABA League Second Division (in 2021) and one ABA League Supercup (in 2023) in its history.

== History ==
The club was founded in 1997 in Podgorica, Montenegro, then part of FR Yugoslavia. The club's founder is the Podgorica Student Dormitory.

In 2015, the club got promoted to the Montenegrin First A League for the 2015–16 season. In 2020, the club joined the Second Adriatic League for the 2020–21 season. The club was league affiliate of Budućnost VOLI.

On 31 August 2021, the club announced a change of their name to SC Derby due to sponsorship reasons.

On 20 September 2023, SC Derby won the ABA League Supercup after their upset win over Partizan in the final, 81-83. The game winner was hit by Borna Kapusta with 4.6 seconds left in the game.

== Players ==
=== Current roster ===
Note: Flags indicate national team eligibility at FIBA-sanctioned events. Players may hold other non-FIBA nationalities not displayed.

SC Derby roster
Players
Coaches

Pos.	No.	Nat.	Name	Ht.	Age
SG	2	(Croatia)	Jordano, Antonio	1.91 m (6 ft 3 in)	27 – 25 February 1999
SG	3	(Serbia)	Radošić, Ognjen	1.97 m (6 ft 6 in)	20 – 26 May 2006
PG	4	(Montenegro)	Pavličević, Nikola (C)	1.92 m (6 ft 4 in)	38 – 13 August 1988
C	5	(Montenegro)	Anđušić, Filip	2.07 m (6 ft 9 in)	24 – 22 January 2002
SF	6	(United States)	Wesson, Andre	1.98 m (6 ft 6 in)	29 – 28 August 1997
F	7	(Croatia)	Bogdanović, Ivan	2.03 m (6 ft 8 in)	22 – 13 July 2004
C	9	(Serbia)	Pavićević, Marko	2.09 m (6 ft 10 in)	25 – 8 May 2001
F	10	(Montenegro)	Šaranović, Nikola	2.00 m (6 ft 7 in)	23 – 20 August 2003
F	11	(British Virgin Islands) (United States)	Penn, Eral	2.01 m (6 ft 7 in)	28 – 2 October 1998
F	13	(United States)	Davis, Jyare	2.01 m (6 ft 7 in)	24 – 8 January 2002
F	21	(Montenegro)	Popović, Marko	2.01 m (6 ft 7 in)	17 – 6 August 2009
PG	22	(Montenegro)	Komnenović, Vladimir	1.82 m (6 ft 0 in)	19 – 12 March 2007
PG	23	(Serbia)	Uskoković, Aleksa	1.90 m (6 ft 3 in)	27 – 30 August 1999
SG	44	(Montenegro)	Nikezić, Danilo	2.01 m (6 ft 7 in)	19 – 1 February 2007
F	55	(Croatia)	Dujaković, Zvonimir	2.07 m (6 ft 9 in)	18 – 8 May 2008

Head coach

- (Montenegro) Petar Mijovic

Assistant coach(es)

- (Serbia) Goran Stevanović
- (Montenegro) Boro Stanišić
- (Montenegro) Duško Vujošević (consultant)

Legend

- (C) Team captain
- Injured

- Roster
Updated: September 15, 2026

=== Depth chart ===
Pos.	Starting 5	Bench 1	Bench 2
C	Marko Pavićević	Filip Anđušić	Zvonimir Dujaković
PF	Jyare Davis	Eral Penn	Ivan Bogdanović
SF	Andre Wesson	Nikola Šaranović	Marko Popović
SG	Antonio Jordano	Ognjen Radošić	Danilo Nikezić
PG	Aleksa Uskoković	Nikola Pavličević	Vladimir Komnenović

== Coaches ==
- (Montenegro) Slavenko Rakočević (2012–2014)
- (Montenegro) Ljubiša Gojšina (2014–2016)
- (Montenegro) Slavenko Rakočević (2016–2017)
- (Montenegro) Stefan Klikovac (2017–2019)
- (Serbia) Nenad Trajković (2019–2021)
- (Slovenia) Andrej Žakelj (2021–2023)
- (Slovenia) Dejan Jakara (2023–2024)
- (Montenegro) Petar Mijović (2024–present)

== Trophies and awards ==
=== Trophies ===
- ABA League Supercup
  - Winner (1): 2023
- Prva A Liga (1st-tier)
  - Finalist (1): 2022–23
- ABA League Second Division (2nd-tier)
  - Winner (1): 2020–21

=== Individual awards ===
- ABA League Second Division MVP Award (1):
  - (Serbia) Marko Tejić – 2020–21
- ABA League Ideal Starting Five (1):
  - (Bosnia and Herzegovina) Kenan Kamenjaš – 2021–22

== Notable players ==
Note: Flags indicate national team eligibility at FIBA-sanctioned events. Players may hold other non-FIBA nationalities not displayed.

Criteria

To appear in this section a player must have either:

- Set a club record or won an individual award while at the club
- Played at least one official international match for their national team at any time
- Played at least one official NBA match at any time.

- (Montenegro) Igor Drobnjak
- (Montenegro) Aleksa Ilić
- (Montenegro) Nikola Pavličević
- (Montenegro) Fedor Žugić
- (Bosnia and Herzegovina) Kenan Kamenjaš
- (Serbia) Marko Tejić
- (United States) Bryon Allen
- (United States) Cedrick Bowen
- (United States) Erick Neal
- (United States) Aubrey Dawkins
- (Puerto Rico) Kyle Vinales
- (United States) Loren Jackson
- (United States) Fletcher Magee
- (United States) Justin Edwards
- (Serbia) Danilo Tasić
