= 2026–27 Indiana Hoosiers men's basketball team =

American college basketball season

2026–27 Indiana Hoosiers men's basketball
- Conference: Big Ten Conference
- Record: 6–0 (0–0 Big Ten)
- Head coach: Darian DeVries (2nd season)
- Assistant coaches: Drew Adams (2nd season); Kenny Johnson (2nd (4th overall) season); Nick Norton (2nd season); Rod Clark (2nd season); Thomas Carr (1st season)
- Home arena: Simon Skjodt Assembly Hall

2026–27 Big Ten Conference men's basketball standings
	Conf.				Overall
Team	W		L	PCT	W		L	PCT
Indiana	0	–	0	–	6	–	0	1.000
Minnesota	0	–	0	–	6	–	0	1.000
No. 24 Nebraska	0	–	0	–	5	–	0	1.000
No. 7 UCLA	0	–	0	–	5	–	0	1.000
No. 18т USC	0	–	0	–	5	–	0	1.000
Washington	0	–	0	–	4	–	0	1.000
No. 10 Illinois	0	–	0	–	5	–	1	.833
Penn State	0	–	0	–	5	–	1	.833
No. 2 Michigan State	0	–	0	–	4	–	1	.800
No. 18т Michigan	0	–	0	–	3	–	1	.750
Oregon	0	–	0	–	3	–	1	.750
Ohio State	0	–	0	–	4	–	2	.667
Purdue	0	–	0	–	4	–	2	.667
Rutgers	0	–	0	–	4	–	2	.667
Wisconsin	0	–	0	–	4	–	2	.667
Iowa	0	–	0	–	3	–	2	.600
Maryland	0	–	0	–	3	–	2	.600
Northwestern	0	–	0	–	3	–	3	.500
† 2027 Big Ten tournament winner As of November 21, 2026; Rankings from AP poll

The 2026–27 Indiana Hoosiers men's basketball team represents Indiana University in the 2026–27 NCAA Division I men's basketball season. They are led by second-year head coach, Darian DeVries. The team plays its home games at Simon Skjodt Assembly Hall in Bloomington, Indiana, as a member of the Big Ten Conference.

== Previous season ==
The Hoosiers found themselves in a promising position to make the NCAA tournament for the first time since 2023 by starting 17–8; however, IU lost five of their last six regular season games. Finishing 10th in the conference, IU earned the No. 10 seed and faced off against No. 15 seed Northwestern, but fell 61–74. The Hoosiers' season concluded with an overall record of 18–14, and 9–11 in Big Ten play. IU missed the NCAA tournament for the third straight year, ending up in the First Four out. On March 15, 2026, IU announced that they would not participate in any postseason tournaments, bringing the first year under Devries to a close.

== Offseason ==
=== Coaching changes ===
On February 23, 2026, Coach DeVries announced that Ryan Carr would be IU's executive director of basketball. Carr is a former Indiana men's basketball manager and 1996 graduate.

A fifth assistant coach was announced by IU on March 27, 2026. Thomas Carr, a former assistant coach under Pat Kelsey at Louisville, has twice been named to the Silver Waves Media 2026 100 Most Impactful High Major Assistants, with a decade of experience at the Division I level.

=== Departures ===
Indiana departures
Name	Number	Pos.	Height	Weight	Year	Hometown	Reason for departure
Jasai Miles	0	G	6'6"	210	Junior	Miami, FL	Transferred to Loyola Marymount
Reed Bailey	1	F	6'10"	230	Senior	Harvard, MA	Transferred to St. Johns
Jason Drake	2	G	6'1"	200	Junior	Oak Park, MI	Transferred to Temple
Lamar Wilkerson	3	G	6'6"	205	Senior	Ashdown, AR	Graduated. Declared for the 2026 NBA draft; signed with the Oklahoma City Thunder as an undrafted free agent.
Sam Alexis	4	F	6'9"	240	Senior	Apopka, FL	Graduated. Signed with the Oklahoma City Thunder on a 2026 NBA Summer League contract.
Conor Enright	5	G	6'1"	180	RS Senior	Mundelein, IL	Graduated
Tayton Conerway	6	G	6'3"	190	RS Senior	Burleson, TX	Graduated/transfer portal
Nick Dorn	7	G	6'7"	225	Junior	Charlotte, NC	Transferred to Miami
Josh Harris	10	F	6'8"	225	Sophomore	Pembroke Pines, FL	Transferred to Florida Atlantic
Tucker DeVries	12	F	6'7"	225	RS Senior	Waukee, IA	Graduated. Declared for the 2026 NBA draft; signed with the Boston Celtics on an Exhibit 10 contract.
Aleksa Ristić	13	G	6'3"	200	Freshman	Kragujevac, Serbia	Transferred to Belmont
Andrej Acimovic	15	C	6'10"	240	Freshman	Bijeljina, Bosnia and Herzegovina	Transferred to Missouri State

=== Incoming transfers ===
With most scholarship players being graduating seniors, IU needed to hit the transfer portal once again. On April 13, 2026, the Hoosiers got a trio of transfer portal commits in Jaeden Mustaf, a sophomore from Georgia Tech; Darren Harris, a sophomore from Duke; and Markus Burton, a junior from Notre Dame. During the last two seasons with the Yellow Jackets, Mustaf averaged 9.4 points, 3.7 rebounds, and 2 assists per game. He was the third-leading scorer for Georgia Tech in the 2025–26 season. Harris committed to Duke as a 4-star prospect in the 2024 recruiting cycle out of Paul VI Catholic High School, where he was ranked as the No. 8 shooting guard in the class and the No. 38 overall player, according to the Rivals Industry Ranking. He spent the last two years coming off the bench at Duke. Burton is from Mishawaka, Indiana, and was the 2023 Indiana Mr. Basketball. He started 68 of the 69 games he played in for the Fighting Irish under Head Coach Micah Shrewsberry. He holds career averages of 19.1 points, 3.8 assists, 3.4 rebounds and 1.8 steals in 33.2 minutes per game. His career shooting percentage is 43.8 overall, 33.2 percent on 3-pointers, and 84.7 percent from the free-throw line. In his first season at Notre Dame, the 2023-24 season, he was the ACC Rookie of the Year. Burton only played in 10 games in the last season, due to a broken left ankle, and underwent season-ending surgery in December 2025. He is currently seeking a medical red shirt waiver; if granted, he will have two years of eligibility left.

Continuing to fill in spots, on April 14, 2026, the Hoosiers added much-needed size to its frontcourt with transfer portal commit Samet Yiğitoğlu, a sophomore from SMU. In the previous year, Yigitoglu averaged 10.4 points, 7.1 rebounds, 1.3 assists, and 1.2 blocked shots in 26.7 minutes per game. He shot 58.3 percent from the field and 53.1 percent from the free-throw line. Per Alex Bozich of Inside the Hall, "He amassed seven double-doubles, which was seventh in the ACC and scored in double figures in 24 games. He also had 14 games with two or more blocked shots. His block percentage of 5.6 in conference play ranked ninth in the ACC, according to KenPom.com. The number that stands out statistically with Yigitoglu is his offensive rebounding. His offensive rebounding percentage of 14.4 percent ranked 44th nationally, per KenPom.com. He was the ACC's best offensive rebounder in conference play with an offensive rebounding percentage of 15.4."

On April 15, 2026, IU added a pair of transfer portal commits with Aiden Sherrell, a sophomore from Alabama; and Bryce Lindsay, a redshirt sophomore from Villanova. Sherrell, a 6-foot-11, 255-pound forward, is a native of Detroit, Michigan and was a 2024 McDonald's All-American. Over 70 career games under Head Coach Nate Oats at Alabama, Sherrell averaged 7.2 points, 4.5 rebounds, 1.2 blocked shots, and 0.7 assists in 16.1 minutes per game. Lindsay, over 72 career games, has career averages of 11.6 points, 2.2 rebounds, two assists, and 0.6 steals in 26.6 minutes per game. Prior to his lone season at Villanova, he also spent a single season at James Madison and Texas A&M.

On May 12, 2026, IU added Justin Monden of Maryland Eastern Shore through the transfer portal. Monden is a 6'0" 160lb senior guard who averaged 6 points, 1.2 rebounds, and 1.6 assists per game in his junior year. Prior to his single season at UMES, he played two seasons for Georgia Southwestern State, where he averaged 12.2 points and 2.1 assists per game.

On June 1, 2026, it was first reported that Cal State Fullerton guard Ben Winker would be joining the Hoosiers as a walk-on. In his freshman year at Cal State Fullerton, he averaged 0.9 points, 1.8 rebounds, and 0.4 assists across 4.4 minutes played per game.

Indiana incoming transfers
Name	Number	Pos	Height	Weight	Year	Hometown	Previous school	Years remaining
Darren Harris	1	G	6'5"	205	Junior	Herndon, VA	Duke	3
Bryce Lindsay	2	G	6'4"	200	Senior	Baltimore, MD	Villanova	2
Jaeden Mustaf	3	G	6'6"	215	Junior	Bowie, MD	Georgia Tech	3
Markus Burton	5	G	6'0"	180	Senior	Mishawaka, IN	Notre Dame	2
Justin Monden	12	G	6'0"	160	Senior	Raleigh, NC	Maryland Eastern Shore	2
Samet Yiğitoğlu	21	C	7'2"	270	Junior	Istanbul, Turkey	SMU	3
Aiden Sherrell	22	F	7'0"	250	Junior	Detroit, MI	Alabama	3
Ben Winker	33	F	6'10"	220	Sophomore	St. Louis, MO	Cal State Fullerton	4

=== Recruiting classes ===
==== 2026 recruiting class ====
College recruiting
Name	Hometown	School	Height	Weight	Commit date
Prince-Alexander Moody #26 SG	District Heights, MD	Bishop McNamara	6 ft 4 in (1.93 m)	185 lb (84 kg)	Jun 27, 2025
Prince-Alexander Moody #26 SG	Recruit ratings: Scout: Rivals: 247Sports: ESPN: (82)				
Vaughn Karvala #24 SF	Oregon, WI	Bella Vista Prep	6 ft 8 in (2.03 m)	185 lb (84 kg)	Nov 1, 2025
Vaughn Karvala #24 SF	Recruit ratings: Scout: Rivals: 247Sports: ESPN: (87)				
Trevor Manhertz #30 SF	Cary, NC	Christ School	6 ft 9 in (2.06 m)	185 lb (84 kg)	Jan 28, 2026
Trevor Manhertz #30 SF	Recruit ratings: Scout: Rivals: 247Sports: ESPN: (84)				
Clemens Sokolov; C	Nuremberg, Germany	Würzburg Baskets Akademie	7 ft 0 in (2.13 m)	265 lb (120 kg)	May 8, 2026
Clemens Sokolov; C	Recruit ratings: No ratings found				

==== 2027 recruiting class ====
College recruiting (2027)
Name	Hometown	School	Height	Weight	Commit date
Chase Branham #4 SG	Rogersville, MO	La Lumiere	6 ft 4 in (1.93 m)	185 lb (84 kg)	Sep 20, 2025
Chase Branham #4 SG	Recruit ratings: Scout: Rivals: 247Sports: ESPN: (89)				
Felix Kiehlneker; C	Ulm, Germany	OrangeAcademy	7 ft 0 in (2.13 m)	227 lb (103 kg)	Sep 15, 2026
Felix Kiehlneker; C	Recruit ratings: No ratings found				
Darius Wabbington #2 C	Phoenix, AZ	Sunnyslope	6 ft 10 in (2.08 m)	245 lb (111 kg)	Oct 6, 2026
Darius Wabbington #2 C	Recruit ratings: Rivals: 247Sports: ESPN: (93)				

==== 2029 recruiting class ====
College recruiting (2029)
Name	Hometown	School	Height	Weight	Commit date
Micah Mohler; SG	Henryville, IN	Austin	6 ft 5 in (1.96 m)	205 lb (93 kg)	Oct 13, 2026
Micah Mohler; SG	Recruit ratings: No ratings found				

== Roster ==
2026–27 Indiana Hoosiers men's basketball team
Players
Coaches

Pos.	#	Name	Height	Weight	Year	Previous school	Hometown
F	0	Trevor Manhertz	6 ft 9 in (2.06 m)	185 lb (84 kg)	Fr	Christ School	Cary, NC
G	1	Darren Harris	6 ft 5 in (1.96 m)	205 lb (93 kg)	Jr	Duke	Herndon, VA
G	2	Bryce Lindsay	6 ft 4 in (1.93 m)	200 lb (91 kg)	Sr	Villanova	Baltimore, MD
G	3	Jaeden Mustaf	6 ft 6 in (1.98 m)	215 lb (98 kg)	Jr	Georgia Tech	Bowie, MD
F	4	Sam Alexis	6 ft 9 in (2.06 m)	240 lb (109 kg)	GS	Florida	Apopka, FL
G	5	Markus Burton	6 ft 0 in (1.83 m)	180 lb (82 kg)	Sr	Notre Dame	Mishawaka, IN
G	8	Prince-Alexander Moody (injured)	6 ft 4 in (1.93 m)	185 lb (84 kg)	Fr	Bishop McNamara	District Heights, MD
G	10	Drew Snively (W)	6 ft 6 in (1.98 m)	205 lb (93 kg)	So	Zionsville	Zionsville, IN
F	11	Trent Sisley	6 ft 8 in (2.03 m)	230 lb (104 kg)	So	Montverde Academy	Santa Claus, IN
G	12	Justin Monden	6 ft 0 in (1.83 m)	160 lb (73 kg)	Sr	Maryland Eastern Shore	Raleigh, NC
G	14	Jordan Rayford (W)	6 ft 5 in (1.96 m)	215 lb (98 kg)	GS	Air Force	Washington, D.C.
C	17	Clemens Sokolov	7 ft 0 in (2.13 m)	265 lb (120 kg)	Fr	Würzburg Baskets Akademie	Nuremberg, Germany
C	21	Samet Yiğitoğlu	7 ft 2 in (2.18 m)	270 lb (122 kg)	Jr	SMU	Istanbul, Turkey
F	22	Aiden Sherrell	7 ft 0 in (2.13 m)	250 lb (113 kg)	Jr	Alabama	Detroit, MI
F	24	Vaughn Karvala	6 ft 8 in (2.03 m)	185 lb (84 kg)	Fr	Bella Vista Prep	Oregon, WI
G	30	Ian Stephens (W)	6 ft 6 in (1.98 m)	180 lb (82 kg)	Sr	New Palestine	New Palestine, IN
F	33	Ben Winker (W)	6 ft 10 in (2.08 m)	220 lb (100 kg)	So	Cal State Fullerton	St. Louis, MO

Head coach

- Darian DeVries (Northern Iowa)

Assistant coach(es)

- Drew Adams (Iowa)
- Kenny Johnson (Maryland)
- Nick Norton (Drake)
- Rod Clark (Lindsey Wilson)
- Thomas Carr (Pfeiffer)

Legend

- (C) Team captain
- (S) Suspended
- (I) Ineligible
- (W) Walk-on
- Injured
- Current redshirt

Roster
Last update: October 11, 2026

== Schedule and results ==
Date time, TV	Rank^{#}	Opponent^{#}	Result	Record	High points	High rebounds	High assists	Site (attendance) city, state
FISU America Games
July 15, 2026*; 7:00 p.m.		Collège Jean-de-Brébeuf	W 98–64	–	16 – Sherrell	6 – Tied	6 – Tied	Simon Skjodt Assembly Hall; Bloomington, IN
July 21, 2026*; 6:00 p.m., YouTube		vs. Peru; 2026 FISU America Games Group Stage	W 115–36	–	19 – Sherrell	10 – Sherrell	6 – Burton	VES Sports Centre; Lima, Peru
July 23, 2026*; 6:00 p.m., YouTube		vs. U.S. Virgin Islands; 2026 FISU America Games Group Stage	W 120–63	–	32 – Karvala	9 – Sherrell	6 – Lindsay	VES Sports Centre; Lima, Peru
July 25, 2026*; 3:00 p.m., YouTube		vs. Chile; 2026 FISU America Games Semifinal	W 107–40	–	16 – Karvala	8 – Harris	8 – Moody	VES Sports Centre; Lima, Peru
July 27, 2026*; 4:00 p.m., YouTube		vs. U.S. Virgin Islands; 2026 FISU America Games Final	W 99–57	–	17 – Lindsay	10 – Sherrell	6 – Lindsay	VES Sports Centre; Lima, Peru
Exhibition
October 11, 2026*; 6:30 p.m., WISH		at Butler	W 96–68	–	13 – Tied	9 – Sherrell	3 – Tied	Hinkle Fieldhouse (9,100); Indianapolis, IN
October 18, 2026*; 5:00 p.m., B1G+		vs. North Carolina	W 76–58	–	26 – Lindsay	11 – Yigitoglu	3 – Manhertz	Gainbridge Fieldhouse (7,462); Indianapolis, IN
October 25, 2026*; 4:00 p.m., B1G+		vs. Western Kentucky	W 79–74	–	20 – Lindsay	7 – Mustaf	4 – Yiğitoğlu	Ford Center (7,522); Evansville, IN
Regular season
November 2, 2026*; 7:00 p.m., B1G+		Eastern Illinois	W 91–57	1–0	19 – Burton	7 – Yigitoglu	5 – Burton	Simon Skjodt Assembly Hall (17,222); Bloomington, IN
November 5, 2026*; 6:00 p.m., NBCSN/Peacock		Bellarmine	W 92–69	2–0	23 – Harris	6 – Tied	4 – Tied	Simon Skjodt Assembly Hall (17,222); Bloomington, IN
November 9, 2026*; 6:30 p.m., FS1		vs. Syracuse	W 83–80	3–0	20 – Tied	10 – Yigitoglu	4 – Burton	Gainbridge Fieldhouse (5,047); Indianapolis, IN
November 12, 2026*; 6:30 p.m., BTN		Tennessee Tech	W 90–66	4–0	18 – Yigitoglu	8 – Sherrell	7 – Burton	Simon Skjodt Assembly Hall (17,222); Bloomington, IN
November 17, 2026*; 7:30 p.m., NBCSN/Peacock		vs. No. 20 Arkansas; The Bad Boy Mowers Series – New York	W 81–76	5–0	18 – Harris	10 – Yigitoglu	5 – Lindsay	Madison Square Garden (9,761); New York City, NY
November 20, 2026*; 8:00 p.m., CBS		vs. Kentucky; Rivalry	W 90-76	6–0	20 – Lindsay	7 – Sherrell	6 – Burton	Lucas Oil Stadium (23,078); Indianapolis, IN
November 24, 2026*; 7:00 p.m., B1G+		Jacksonville						Simon Skjodt Assembly Hall; Bloomington, IN
November 27, 2026*; 6:00 p.m., BTN		Bowling Green						Simon Skjodt Assembly Hall; Bloomington, IN
December 1, 2026; 8:00 p.m., FS1		Rutgers						Simon Skjodt Assembly Hall; Bloomington, IN
December 3, 2026*; 6:00 p.m., BTN		Western Illinois						Simon Skjodt Assembly Hall; Bloomington, IN
December 7, 2026; 7:00 p.m., FS1		at Iowa						Carver–Hawkeye Arena; Iowa City, IA
December 12, 2026*; 12:00 p.m., FS1		UCF						Simon Skjodt Assembly Hall; Bloomington, IN
December 18, 2026*; 6:00 p.m., FS1		Missouri						Simon Skjodt Assembly Hall; Bloomington, IN
December 22, 2026*; 7:00 p.m., B1G+		Fairleigh Dickinson						Simon Skjodt Assembly Hall; Bloomington, IN
January 2, 2027; 2:00 p.m., NBCSN/Peacock		USC						Simon Skjodt Assembly Hall; Bloomington, IN
January 6, 2027; 10:30 p.m., BTN		at Oregon						Matthew Knight Arena; Eugene, OR
January 9, 2027; 3:00 p.m., NBCSN/Peacock		at Washington						Hec Edmundson Pavilion; Seattle, WA
January 12, 2027; 6:00 p.m., FS1		Maryland						Simon Skjodt Assembly Hall; Bloomington, IN
January 16, 2027; 1:00 p.m., CBS		Michigan						Simon Skjodt Assembly Hall; Bloomington, IN
January 20, 2027; 8:30 p.m., BTN		at Minnesota						Williams Arena; Minneapolis, MN
January 24, 2027; 12:00 p.m., CBS		Illinois; Rivalry						Simon Skjodt Assembly Hall; Bloomington, IN
January 27, 2027; 7:00 p.m., BTN		at Northwestern						Welsh–Ryan Arena; Evanston, IL
January 30, 2027; 12:00 p.m., CBS		UCLA						Simon Skjodt Assembly Hall; Bloomington, IN
February 2, 2027; 6:00 p.m., FS1		at Penn State						Bryce Jordan Center; State College, PA
February 6, 2027; 2:30 p.m./6:00 p.m./8:00 p.m., FOX		at Nebraska						Pinnacle Bank Arena; Lincoln, NE
February 9, 2027; 7:30 p.m., BTN		Northwestern						Simon Skjodt Assembly Hall; Bloomington, IN
February 13, 2027; 12:00 p.m., FOX		at Maryland						Xfinity Center; College Park, MD
February 16, 2027; 7:00 p.m., NBCSN/Peacock		Purdue; Rivalry / Indiana National Guard Governor's Cup						Simon Skjodt Assembly Hall; Bloomington, IN
February 19, 2027; 8:00 p.m., FS1		at Wisconsin						Kohl Center; Madison, WI
February 23, 2027; 7:00 p.m., NBCSN/Peacock		Michigan State						Simon Skjodt Assembly Hall; Bloomington, IN
February 28, 2027; 3:45 p.m., CBS		Ohio State						Simon Skjodt Assembly Hall; Bloomington, IN
March 5, 2027; 8:00 p.m., FOX		at Purdue; Rivalry / Indiana National Guard Governor's Cup						Mackey Arena; West Lafayette, IN
Big Ten Tournament
March 9–14, 2027; BTN		vs. First Round/Second Round/Third Round/Quarterfinals						Gainbridge Fieldhouse; Indianapolis, IN
*Non-conference game. ^{#}Rankings from AP Poll. (#) Tournament seedings in parentheses. All times are in Eastern Time.

== Rankings ==
Ranking movements Legend: ██ Increase in ranking ██ Decrease in ranking — = Not ranked RV = Received votes
	Week																				
Poll	Pre	1	2	3	4	5	6	7	8	9	10	11	12	13	14	15	16	17	18	19	Final
AP	RV	RV	—																		
Coaches	RV	RV	RV																		

== Awards and honors ==
=== Pre-season awards ===
Name	Award	Date
Markus Burton	Bob Cousy Point Guard of the Year Award Preseason Watchlist	October 26, 2026
Aiden Sherrell	Karl Malone Power Forward of the Year Award Preseason Watchlist	October 29, 2026
