= Trent Sisley =

American college basketball player

No. 11 – Indiana Hoosiers
- Position: Power forward
- League: Big Ten Conference

Personal information
- Born: August 11, 2006 (age 20)
- Listed height: 6 ft 8 in (2.03 m)
- Listed weight: 230 lb (104 kg)

Career information
- High school: Heritage Hills (Lincoln City, Indiana); Montverde Academy (Montverde, Florida)
- College: Indiana (2025–present)
Medals
Men's basketball
Representing United States
FISU America Games
Gold medal – first place	2026 Peru	Team competition

Trent Sisley is an American college basketball player for the Indiana Hoosiers of the Big Ten Conference (B1G).

== Early life and high school career ==
From 2021 to 2024, Sisley played for Heritage Hills High School in Lincoln City, Indiana, where he is the all-time leading scorer with 1715 career points. He also holds all-time records for the school in field goals, rebounds, and free throws. In his time at Heritage Hills, he averaged 24.8 points and 11.7 rebounds per game.

For the 2024–25 season, Sisley played for Montverde Academy. While there, he was named the MVP of the 2025 team after averaging 10.7 points, 5.7 rebounds, and 1.7 assists per game and leading the team in 3-point percentage (44%).

Sisley committed to the Hoosiers on November 13, 2024, over offers from Purdue, Iowa, Notre Dame, and Michigan State. He was a consensus 4-star recruit ranked top 100 by 247Sports, Rivals.com, and ESPN.

== College career ==
=== 2025–26 season ===
Sisley was the lone freshman on the roster for the 2025 season. As a true freshman, Sisley averaged 4.2 points and 2.8 rebounds across 30 games played. He scored a career high 15 points in a 100–77 road win against Marquette on November 9, 2025. His second best game of the season came against Kansas State on November 25, 2025, in which he scored 12 points. Across the first 12 games of the season he averaged 20 minutes per game, scoring double digit points in four of the first 7. However, later in the season he averaged only 8.5 minutes and 1.6 points per game. On November 29, 2025, he put up 14 points and 9 rebounds in a 100–56 win over Bethune-Cookman.

=== 2026–27 season ===
Sisley was the only returning scholarship player from the 2025-26 roster, with the rest either transferring or graduating.

== National team career ==
Sisley was a part of the Indiana team chosen to represent the United States in the 2026 FISU America Games in Lima, Peru. He helped the U.S. capture the gold medal after winning all four games with an average victory margin of 60.8 points. Sisley started against Peru and also scored 13 points against Chile.

== Personal life ==
Sisley's father, Matt Sisley, played college basketball for Southeast Missouri State and coached high school basketball at Heritage Hills. His older brother, Blake Sisley, played for Evansville and Wright State. His mother, Heather Sisley, is a first-grade teacher. He also has two sisters, Claire and Lauren.

== Career statistics ==
Legend
GP	Games played	GS	Games started	MPG	Minutes per game
FG%	Field goal percentage	3P%	3-point field goal percentage	FT%	Free throw percentage
RPG	Rebounds per game	APG	Assists per game	SPG	Steals per game
BPG	Blocks per game	PPG	Points per game	**Bold**	Career high

=== College ===
Year	Team	GP	GS	MPG	FG%	3P%	FT%	RPG	APG	SPG	BPG	PPG
2025–26	Indiana	30	0	13.2	.430	.271	.538	2.8	.4	.1	.1	4.2
2026–27	Indiana											
Career		30	0	13.2	.430	.271	.538	2.8	.4	.1	.1	4.2
