= Jaeden Mustaf =

American basketball player

No. 3 – Indiana Hoosiers
- Position: Shooting guard
- Conference: Big Ten Conference

Personal information
- Born: May 3, 2005 (age 21) Annapolis, Maryland, U.S.
- Listed height: 6 ft 6 in (1.98 m)
- Listed weight: 215 lb (98 kg)

Career information
- High school: DeMatha Catholic (Washington, DC); Carmel Christian School (Matthews, North Carolina)
- College: Georgia Tech (2024–2026); Indiana (2026–present)
Medals
Men's basketball
Representing United States
FISU America Games
| Gold medal – first place | 2026 Peru | Team competition |

Jaeden Mustaf is an American college basketball player for the Indiana Hoosiers of the Big Ten Conference. He previously played for the Georgia Tech Yellow Jackets.

== Early life ==
Mustaf grew up in Bowie, Maryland, and initially attended DeMatha Catholic High School, where he played for two years. Mustaf's father, Jerrod Mustaf, played at DeMatha before eventually playing for the Maryland Terrapins and the New York Knicks. Mustaf later moved to Matthews, North Carolina, where he played for Carmel Christian School. At Carmel Christian, Mustaf was a finalist for North Carolina Mr. Basketball, finishing behind future Duke player Isaiah Evans. In 2022, Mustaf was named MVP of the 2022 Adidas 3SSB 17U Championship. In the 2023/24 season, Mustaf played for the City Reapers of Overtime Elite (OTE), playing alongside future Kansas Jayhawks player Bryson Tiller and future Georgia tight end Jahzare Jackson. As part of the City Reapers, the team reached the finals, defeating Rod Wave Elite (RWE) to win the OTE title. Mustaf committed to Georgia Tech over offers from Indiana, NC State, Maryland, Arkansas, and Florida State.

== College career ==
=== Georgia Tech ===
On September 14, 2023, Mustaf committed to play for Georgia Tech. As a freshman, he was the Jackets' seventh leading scorer, averaging 8.3 points in 26 games played. As a sophomore, Mustaf was the third leading scorer on the team, averaging 10.4 points in 29 games and 23 starts. He scored a career-high 28 points against Clemson, and had nine games with 15 or more points. In his time at Georgia Tech, he totaled 516 points, 206 rebounds, 112 assists, and 39 steals with 55 games played.

=== Indiana ===
On April 13, 2026, Mustaf transferred to play for the Indiana Hoosiers with two years of eligibility remaining.

== National team career ==
Mustaf was a part of the Indiana team chosen to represent the United States in the 2026 FISU America Games in Lima, Peru. He helped the U.S. capture the gold medal after winning all four games with an average victory margin of 60.8 points.

== Personal life ==
Mustaf's father, Jerrod Mustaf, played college basketball for the Maryland Terrapins, and was drafted 17th overall by the New York Knicks. Mustaf has 8 siblings, Ashley, JaKarrea, Terah, Amira, Jerrod II, Imani, Shaar, and Jamal. Three of Mustaf's sisters played college basketball: Imani (Richmond), Ashley (Maryland Eastern Shore), and Terah (Allegheny College).

== Career statistics ==
Legend
| GP | Games played | GS | Games started | MPG | Minutes per game |
| FG% | Field goal percentage | 3P% | 3-point field goal percentage | FT% | Free throw percentage |
| RPG | Rebounds per game | APG | Assists per game | SPG | Steals per game |
| BPG | Blocks per game | PPG | Points per game | **Bold** | Career high |

=== College ===
| Year | Team | GP | GS | MPG | FG% | 3P% | FT% | RPG | APG | SPG | BPG | PPG |
|---|---|---|---|---|---|---|---|---|---|---|---|---|
| 2024–25 | Georgia Tech | 26 | 10 | 24.4 | .393 | .344 | .714 | 3.1 | 1.6 | **0.9** | 0.1 | 8.3 |
| 2025–26 | Georgia Tech | **29** | **23** | **27.8** | **.433** | **.389** | **.727** | **4.3** | **2.4** | 0.6 | **0.2** | **10.4** |
| 2026–27 | Indiana | | | | | | | | | | | |
| Career | | 55 | 33 | 26.2 | .415 | .372 | .722 | 3.7 | 2.0 | 0.7 | 0.1 | 9.4 |
