= 2025–26 Indiana Hoosiers men's basketball team =

American college basketball season

2025–26 Indiana Hoosiers men's basketball
- Conference: Big Ten Conference
- Record: 18–14 (9–11 Big Ten)
- Head coach: Darian DeVries (1st season)
- Assistant coaches: Drew Adams (1st season); Kenny Johnson (1st (3rd overall) season); Nick Norton (1st season); Rod Clark (1st season)
- Home arena: Simon Skjodt Assembly Hall

2025–26 Big Ten Conference men's basketball standings
	Conf.				Overall
Team	W		L	PCT	W		L	PCT
No. 1 Michigan	19	–	1	.950	37	–	3	.925
No. 14 Nebraska	15	–	5	.750	28	–	7	.800
No. 5 Illinois	15	–	5	.750	28	–	9	.757
No. 11 Michigan State	15	–	5	.750	27	–	8	.771
No. 25 Wisconsin	14	–	6	.700	24	–	11	.686
No. 6 Purdue †	13	–	7	.650	30	–	9	.769
UCLA	13	–	7	.650	24	–	12	.667
Ohio State	12	–	8	.600	21	–	13	.618
No. 15 Iowa	10	–	10	.500	24	–	13	.649
Indiana	9	–	11	.450	18	–	14	.563
Minnesota	8	–	12	.400	15	–	18	.455
USC	7	–	13	.350	18	–	14	.563
Washington	7	–	13	.350	16	–	17	.485
Rutgers	6	–	14	.300	14	–	20	.412
Northwestern	5	–	15	.250	15	–	19	.441
Oregon	5	–	15	.250	12	–	20	.375
Maryland	4	–	16	.200	12	–	21	.364
Penn State	3	–	17	.150	12	–	20	.375
† 2026 Big Ten tournament winner Rankings from AP poll

The 2025–26 Indiana Hoosiers men's basketball team represented Indiana University in the 2025–26 NCAA Division I men's basketball season. They were led by first-year head coach Darian DeVries. The team played its home games at Simon Skjodt Assembly Hall in Bloomington, Indiana, as a member of the Big Ten Conference. Instead of the traditional Hoosier Hysteria, the season began with a new event called Hoosier Hoops on Kirkwood. The block party took place on October 2, 2025, on Kirkwood Avenue in downtown Bloomington.

The Hoosiers found themselves in a promising position to make the NCAA tournament for the first time since 2023 by starting 17–8; however, IU had lost five of their last six regular season games. Finishing 10th in the conference, IU earned the No. 10 seed and faced off against No. 15 seed Northwestern, but fell 61–74. The Hoosiers' season concluded with an overall record of 18–14, and 9–11 in Big Ten play. IU missed the NCAA tournament for the third straight year, ending up in the First Four out. On March 15, 2026, IU announced that they would not participate in any postseason tournaments, bringing the first year under Devries to a close.

== Previous season ==
By missing out on the 2025 NCAA Tournament, the Woodson era came to a close. Turning down other post-season tournament invites, the Hoosiers finished with an overall record of 19–13, and 10–10 in Big Ten Conference play.

== Offseason ==
=== Coaching changes ===
On March 18, 2025, Indiana University announced Darian DeVries as its 31st head coach of the men's basketball program. Devries is originally from Aplington, Iowa. He played collegiately at Northern Iowa before becoming an assistant coach for 17 years at Creighton; he then became the head coach at Drake and most recently West Virginia. As a head coach, his incoming record was 169–68 (.713).

The first addition to Devries' staff came on March 31, 2025. It was announced that Assistant Coach Drew Adams, a former assistant coach/recruiting coordinator for the Cincinnati Bearcats (a job he held for two years) would be coming back to Indiana. He is a native of Bloomington, Indiana, and graduated from Bloomington South in 2004. He was then recruited to Iowa to play under Steve Alford, a former Hoosier legend. Adams spent two years on Tom Crean's staff at Indiana, first as Coordinator of Basketball Systems in 2009–10 before being promoted to Director of Operations for the 2010–11 season. He has also coached on the AAU level for the Indiana Elite program.

The second addition to the coaching staff was officially announced on April 3, 2025. Assistant Coach Nick Norton followed Coach Devries from West Virginia, where he served as an assistant coach and director of player development. Per Coach Devries, "We are excited to have Nick join our staff. He brings tremendous knowledge and feel for what we want our program to be about. He is terrific with the players on the floor and brings incredible energy every day to the practice floor." Norton began his collegiate career at UAB, but finished at Drake playing for DeVries. In 2019, he signed with the South Bay Lakers of the NBA G League, but had a very short season/career due to injuries. Norton returned to Drake during the 2021–22 season, but this time as an assistant director of operations. He then was promoted to director of operations prior to the 2022–23 season. He was promoted again to assistant coach/director of player development for the 2023–24 campaign.

On April 11, 2025, two more coaches' names were revealed: former IU assistant coach Kenny Johnson and Mike Bargen. Johnson was an assistant under Coach Tom Crean for two seasons 2012–13 and 2013–14. Since then, Johnson has been an assistant coach at multiple stops including Louisville, La Salle, Rhode Island, and most recently Georgetown. Per Alex Bozich from Inside the Hall, "Johnson has coached numerous NBA players including but not limited to Terry Rozier, Montrezl Harrell, Damion Lee, Jordan Nwora, Donovan Mitchell, Victor Oladipo, Cody Zeller, Noah Vonleh, Josh Hart and Jerami Grant. Johnson is known as a top recruiter on a national level and an elite talent developer. After surveying more than 60 collegiate coaches, ESPN Insider named Johnson as the nation's 10th-best recruiting assistant coach in a 2016 listing."

Bargen comes to IU by way of Bradley University, where he had been the associate head coach/assistant coach for the past ten years, seven of which he worked alongside IU's assistant coach, Drew Adams. At this time, Bargen's official title had yet to be determined; however, he will not be an assistant coach.

A fourth assistant coach was officially announced on April 30, 2025: Rod Clark. Clark spent the last four seasons on the bench next to Rick Barnes as an assistant for the Tennessee Volunteers. Three of those years, he helped lead Tennessee to two Sweet Sixteen appearances and an Elite Eight. Also, every year at Tennessee Clark has been instrumental in getting at least one Volunteer drafted in the NBA. As a collegiate player, Clark started out at a junior college Neosho County Community College, next Redlands Community College, and then finished at Lindsey Wilson College, an NAIA school.

=== Departures ===
Indiana departures
Name	Number	Pos.	Height	Weight	Year	Hometown	Reason for departure
Jakai Newton	0	G	6'3"	210	RS FR	Covington, GA	Transferred to Georgia State
Myles Rice	0	G	6'3"	210	RS SO	Columbia, SC	Transferred to Maryland
Gabe Cupps	2	G	6'2"	180	RS SO	Dayton, OH	Transferred to Ohio State
Anthony Leal	3	G	6'5"	200	SR	Bloomington, IN	Graduated
Malik Reneau	5	F	6'9"	232	JR	Miami, FL	Transferred to Miami
Bryson Tucker	8	F	6'7"	207	FR	Arlington, VA	Transferred to Washington
Kanaan Carlyle	9	G	6'3"	182	SO	Atlanta, GA	Transferred to Florida Atlantic
Luke Goode	10	F	6'7"	203	SR	Fort Wayne, IN	Graduated
Oumar Ballo	11	C	7'0"	265	SR	Koulikoro, Mali	Graduated
Langdon Hatton	12	F	6'10"	247	SR	Georgetown, IN	Graduated
Shaan Burke	13	G	6'4"	190	SR	San Diego, CA	Graduated
Mackenzie Mgbako	21	F	6'9"	222	SO	Gladstone, NJ	Transferred to Texas A&M
Jaden Bobbett	20	G	6'2"	190	SR	Rye, NH	Graduated
Jackson Creel	22	G	6'3"	190	SR	Mount Vernon, IL	Graduated
Trey Galloway	32	G	6'5"	205	SR	Culver, IN	Graduated
Dallas James	42	F	7'0"	245	RS JR	Artesia, CA	Transferred to Morgan State

=== Incoming transfers ===
Once again, IU found itself with a depleted roster after every scholarship player with remaining eligibility hit the transfer portal. Coaches Devries and Adams began working and recruiting the portal right away. IU landed its first transfer in Conor Enright, a redshirt senior from DePaul. Prior to his time at DePaul, Enright played for two seasons at Drake under Head Coach DeVries. During his lone year at DePaul, Enright averaged 7.5 points, 6.2 assists and 2.7 rebounds in 30 minutes per game. He shot 32.5 percent on 3s and 63.3 percent from the free-throw line. His season ended early after a shoulder injury in January required surgery in February. Not long after Enright committed to Indiana on April 2, 2025, another addition was made official when Coach DeVries' son, Tucker DeVries, announced his commitment the same day. While expected, there was a delay in obtaining his medical waiver, allowing him a fifth season. Following his father from West Virginia, DeVries was seen as a "dangerous and versatile guard." Only playing eight games in the last season, DeVries averaged 14.9 points, 4.9 rebounds and 2.8 assists per game. During his three seasons at Drake, fans saw him score 1,300 points, averaging 36.8% from behind the 3-point line. DeVries was named Missouri Valley Conference player of the year in his final two seasons at Drake. DeVries is also a former Iowa Mr. Basketball (2021).

Four days after the first transfer portal commitments, the coaching staff nabbed Reed Bailey from Davidson. Bailey, as a junior at Davidson, was named a first-team All-Atlantic 10 selection. He averaged 18.8 points, 6.1 rebounds, and 3.8 assists in the 2024–25 season (good for second in the Atlantic 10 in scoring and 13th in rebounding). In addition to being named first-team All-Atlantic 10, Bailey earned the Chris Daniels Most Improved Player award. The transfer commitments kept coming as 4-star guard, Lamar Wilkerson, announced his commitment to Indiana on April 15, 2025. Wilkerson transferred from Sam Houston, where he averaged 20.5 points, 4 rebounds, 2.1 assists and 1.1 steals. He shot 44.5 percent on 3s and 82.2 percent from the free-throw line. Wilkerson ranked seventh nationally in 3-point field goal percentage and 13th in made 3-point field goals (109). In the last season, he was a first-team All-Conference USA selection.

Devries and his staff had a big day on April 16, 2025, as two more portal transfers committed to the Hoosiers: Jasai Miles and Tayton Conerway. Miles joined IU after transferring from North Florida, and had two years of eligibility remaining. In the last season, Miles was named a third-team All-ASUN selection. He made 78 out of an attempted 233 3-pointers, which was good for 33.5 percent. He also averaged 15.4 points, 6.8 rebounds and 1.9 assists. Conerway made his announcement a mere two hours after Miles. As a Trojan of Troy University, Conerway was named the Sun Belt Conference player of the year in the last season. He averaged 14.2 points, 4.8 assists, 4.6 rebounds, 2.9 steals, and led his team to a share of the Sun Belt regular season championship and the conference tournament title. Before making the move to Troy, Conerway played JUCO basketball at Grayson College and Ranger College. He had one year of eligibility remaining.

The team grew by one more player when former Drexel guard, Jason "Deuce" Drake committed to play for Coach Devries and staff on April 22, 2025. As a junior at Drexel, Drake averaged 11.1 points, 3.1 assists and three rebounds. He shot 39.6 percent on 3s on 101 attempts and 86.5 percent from the free-throw line on 74 attempts. Prior to his time at Drexel, Drake played at Cleveland State for a year; before that, he spent a year at JUCO Butler Community College. Drake had two years of eligibility remaining. Alex Bozich of Inside the Hall states that with this seventh commitment, IU coaches would turn their attention to finding frontcourt pieces. An eighth transfer portal addition was confirmed on April 24, 2025. Nick Dorn, a former guard at Elon, chose Indiana over North Carolina, Pittsburgh, and Maryland. Standing at 6'7" and weighing 200 pounds, he averaged 15.2 points and 3.8 rebounds. Dorn had two years of eligibility remaining. The coaching staff landed a national champion with their next commitment from Sam Alexis, a 6'8" and 240-pound forward from Florida. Alexis committed to IU late in the evening on April 24, 2025. For his lone season at Florida, Alexis averaged 7.1 points, 5.7 rebounds, 1.2 blocked shots, and 1.1 assists per game. At Chattanooga, Alexis was named third-team All-Southern Conference in the 2023–24 season and to the league's all-defensive team. As a freshman in the 2022–23 season, he was named to the league's All-freshman team.

The roster continued to fill out when the Hoosiers got their 10th transfer portal commitment from Josh Harris. Last year, Harris played for the North Florida Ospreys with fellow IU transfer portal commit, Jasai Miles. As a freshman, Harris started all 30 games he appeared in and averaged 13.4 points and 7.1 rebounds. He shot 55.7 percent from the field, 33.3 percent on 3s and 69.5 percent from the free-throw line. Harris was named to the ASUN All-freshman team and had three seasons of eligibility remaining.

Indiana incoming transfers
Name	Number	Pos	Height	Weight	Year	Hometown	Previous school	Years remaining	Date eligible
Conor Enright	5	G	6'2"	180	RS senior	Mundelein, IL	DePaul	1	October 1, 2025
Tucker DeVries	12	G/F	6'7"	220	RS senior	Waukee, IA	West Virginia	1	October 1, 2025
Reed Bailey	1	F	6'10"	230	Senior	Harvard, MA	Davidson	1	October 1, 2025
Lamar Wilkerson	3	G	6'5"	205	Senior	Ashdown, Arkansas	Sam Houston	1	October 1, 2025
Jasai Miles	0	G	6'6"	210	Junior	Miami, FL	North Florida	2	October 1, 2025
Tayton Conerway	6	G	6'3"	186	Senior	Burleson, TX	Troy	1	October 1, 2025
Jason Drake	2	G	6'2"	195	Junior	Oak Park, MI	Drexel	2	October 1, 2025
Nick Dorn	7	G	6'7"	200	Junior	Charlotte, NC	Elon	2	October 1, 2025
Sam Alexis	4	F	6'8"	240	Senior	Apopka, FL	Florida	1	October 1, 2025
Josh Harris	10	F	6'8"	220	Sophomore	Pembroke Pines, FL	North Florida	3	October 1, 2025

=== Recruiting classes ===
==== 2025 recruiting class ====
College recruiting
Name	Hometown	School	Height	Weight	Commit date
Trent Sisley; PF	Santa Claus, IN	Montverde Academy	6 ft 7 in (2.01 m)	205 lb (93 kg)	Sep 23, 2024
Trent Sisley; PF	Recruit ratings: Rivals: 247Sports: On3: ESPN: (82)				
Aleksa Ristić; G	Kragujevac, Serbia	Solid Rock Academy	6 ft 4 in (1.93 m)	200 lb (91 kg)	Jun 16, 2025
Aleksa Ristić; G	Recruit ratings: No ratings found				
Andrej Aćimović; C	Bijeljina, Bosnia	KK Igokea	6 ft 11 in (2.11 m)	200 lb (91 kg)	Jul 28, 2025
Andrej Aćimović; C	Recruit ratings: No ratings found				
Overall recruit ranking: 247Sports: 36 On3: 77
Note: In many cases, Scout, Rivals, 247Sports, On3, and ESPN may conflict in their listings of height and weight.; In these cases, the average was taken. ESPN grades are on a 100-point scale.; Sources: "2025 Indiana Commits". Rivals.; "ESPN- Indiana Hoosiers Men's Basketball Recruiting". ESPN.; "2025 Team Ranking". Rivals.; "2025–26 Indiana Hoosiers men's basketball team". 247Sports.; "2025–26 Indiana Hoosiers men's basketball team". On3.

==== 2026 recruiting class ====
College recruiting (2026)
Name	Hometown	School	Height	Weight	Commit date
Prince-Alexander Moody; SF	Forestville, MD	Bishop McNamara High School	6 ft 5 in (1.96 m)	180 lb (82 kg)	Jun 27, 2025
Prince-Alexander Moody; SF	Recruit ratings: Scout: Rivals: 247Sports: ESPN: (82)				
Vaughn Karvala; SF	Oregon, WI	Bella Vista Prep	6 ft 6 in (1.98 m)	180 lb (82 kg)	Nov 1, 2025
Vaughn Karvala; SF	Recruit ratings: Scout: Rivals: 247Sports: ESPN: (88)				
Trevor Manhertz; SF	Cary, NC	Christ School	6 ft 8 in (2.03 m)	185 lb (84 kg)	Jan 28, 2026
Trevor Manhertz; SF	Recruit ratings: Scout: Rivals: 247Sports: ESPN: (82)				

==== 2027 recruiting class ====
College recruiting (2027)
Name	Hometown	School	Height	Weight	Commit date
Chase Branham; PG	Rogersville, MO	Logan-Rogersville High School	6 ft 4 in (1.93 m)	175 lb (79 kg)	Sep 17, 2025
Chase Branham; PG	Recruit ratings: Scout: Rivals: 247Sports: ESPN: (86)				

== Roster ==
2025–26 Indiana Hoosiers men's basketball team
Players
Coaches

Pos.	#	Name	Height	Weight	Year	Previous school	Hometown
G	0	Jasai Miles	6 ft 6 in (1.98 m)	210 lb (95 kg)	Jr	Miami Country Day/North Florida	Miami, FL
F	1	Reed Bailey	6 ft 10 in (2.08 m)	230 lb (104 kg)	Sr	Brewster Academy/Davidson	Harvard, MA
G	2	Jason Drake	6 ft 1 in (1.85 m)	200 lb (91 kg)	Jr	Ferndale/Drexel	Oak Park, MI
F	3	Lamar Wilkerson	6 ft 6 in (1.98 m)	205 lb (93 kg)	Sr	Ashdown/Sam Houston	Ashdown, AR
F	4	Sam Alexis	6 ft 9 in (2.06 m)	240 lb (109 kg)	Sr	Apopka/Florida	Apopka, FL
G	5	Conor Enright	6 ft 1 in (1.85 m)	180 lb (82 kg)	RS Sr	Mundelein/DePaul	Mundelein, IL
G	6	Tayton Conerway	6 ft 3 in (1.91 m)	190 lb (86 kg)	RS Sr	Centennial/Troy	Burleson, TX
G	7	Nick Dorn	6 ft 7 in (2.01 m)	225 lb (102 kg)	Jr	Julius L. Chambers/Elon	Charlotte, NC
F	10	Josh Harris	6 ft 8 in (2.03 m)	225 lb (102 kg)	So	Pembroke Pines Charter/North Florida	Pembroke Pines, FL
F	11	Trent Sisley	6 ft 8 in (2.03 m)	225 lb (102 kg)	Fr	Montverde Academy	Santa Claus, IN
F	12	Tucker DeVries	6 ft 7 in (2.01 m)	225 lb (102 kg)	RS Sr	Waukee/West Virginia	Waukee, IA
G	13	Aleksa Ristić	6 ft 3 in (1.91 m)	200 lb (91 kg)	Fr	Solid Rock Academy	Kragujevac, Serbia
G	14	Jordan Rayford (W)	6 ft 5 in (1.96 m)	210 lb (95 kg)	RS Jr	Phillips Academy/Air Force	Washington, D.C.
C	15	Andrej Aćimović	6 ft 11 in (2.11 m)	240 lb (109 kg)	Fr	KK Igokea	Bijeljina, Bosnia
G	18	Tryce Grensing (W)	6 ft 0 in (1.83 m)	175 lb (79 kg)	Fr	Providence Christian Academy	Murfreesboro, TN
G	21	Drew Snively (W)	6 ft 5 in (1.96 m)	190 lb (86 kg)	Fr	Zionsville	Zionsville, IN
G	30	Ian Stephens (W)	6 ft 6 in (1.98 m)	178 lb (81 kg)	Jr	New Palestine	New Palestine, IN

Head coach

- Darian DeVries (Northern Iowa)

Assistant coach(es)

- Drew Adams (Iowa)
- Kenny Johnson (Maryland)
- Nick Norton (Drake)
- Rod Clark (Lindsey Wilson)

Legend

- (C) Team captain
- (S) Suspended
- (I) Ineligible
- (W) Walk-on
- Injured
- Current redshirt

Roster
Last update: October 18, 2025

== Schedule and results ==
Date time, TV	Rank^{#}	Opponent^{#}	Result	Record	High points	High rebounds	High assists	Site (attendance) city, state
Puerto Rico Foreign Tour exhibition games
August 6, 2025*; 7:00 p.m.		Bayamón Central	W 98–47		21 – Sisley	12 – Alexis	7 – DeVries	Coliseo Guillermo Angulo; Carolina, Puerto Rico
August 9, 2025*; 7:00 p.m.		Mega Superbet	W 93–71		18 – Wilkerson	8 – Tied	5 – Conerway	Coliseo Roberto Clemente; Oriente, San Juan, Puerto Rico
August 11, 2025*; 11:00 a.m.		Mega Superbet	W 81–80		18 – Conerway	7 – Bailey	4 – Tied	Coliseo Roberto Clemente; Oriente, San Juan, Puerto Rico
Exhibition
October 17, 2025*; 7:30 p.m., B1G+		Marian (IN)	W 107–46		23 – Tied	10 – Alexis	6 – DeVries	Simon Skjodt Assembly Hall (17,222); Bloomington, IN
October 26, 2025*; 1:00 p.m., B1G+		Baylor	W 76–74		26 – Wilkerson	7 – Alexis	5 – Tied	Gainbridge Fieldhouse (4,507); Indianapolis, IN
Regular season
November 5, 2025*; 8:00 p.m., BTN		Alabama A&M	W 98–51	1–0	21 – Bailey	11 – DeVries	5 – Conerway	Simon Skjodt Assembly Hall (17,222); Bloomington, IN
November 9, 2025*; 1:00 p.m., ESPN		vs. Marquette; Waterkeeper Alliance Invitational	W 100–77	2–0	27 – Devries	5 – Tied	8 – Tied	United Center (14,017); Chicago, IL
November 12, 2025*; 7:00 p.m., FS1		Milwaukee	W 101–70	3–0	24 – Wilkerson	5 – Tied	6 – Conerway	Simon Skjodt Assembly Hall (17,222); Bloomington, IN
November 16, 2025*; 5:30 p.m., BTN		Incarnate Word	W 69–61	4–0	16 – Alexis	8 – Tied	7 – Conerway	Simon Skjodt Assembly Hall (17,222); Bloomington, IN
November 20, 2025*; 6:00 p.m., BTN		Lindenwood	W 73–53	5–0	25 – DeVries	10 – Alexis	4 – Conerway	Simon Skjodt Assembly Hall (17,222); Bloomington, IN
November 25, 2025*; 8:00 p.m., FS1	No. 25	Kansas State	W 86–69	6–0	21 – Bailey	6 – Tied	5 – DeVries	Simon Skjodt Assembly Hall (12,342); Bloomington, IN
November 29, 2025*; 1:00 p.m., BTN	No. 25	Bethune–Cookman	W 100–56	7–0	20 – DeVries	9 – Sisley	7 – Enright	Simon Skjodt Assembly Hall (12,192); Bloomington, IN
December 3, 2025; 7:00 p.m., BTN	No. 22	at Minnesota	L 64–73	7–1 (0–1)	18 – Conerway	4 – Bailey	7 – Enright	Williams Arena (8,582); Minneapolis, MN
December 6, 2025*; 2:15 p.m., CBS	No. 22	vs. No. 6 Louisville; CareSource Invitational Indianapolis	L 78–87	7–2	26 – DeVries	5 – Tied	4 – Tied	Gainbridge Fieldhouse (18,777); Indianapolis, IN
December 9, 2025; 8:30 p.m., FS1		Penn State	W 113–72	8–2 (1–1)	44 – Wilkerson	8 – Sisley	8 – Enright	Simon Skjodt Assembly Hall (17,222); Bloomington, IN
December 13, 2025*; 7:30 p.m., ESPN		at Kentucky; Rivalry	L 60–72	8–3	15 – Tied	7 – Tied	3 – DeVries;	Rupp Arena (20,061); Lexington, KY
December 20, 2025*; 1:00 p.m., B1G+		Chicago State	W 78–58	9–3	21 – Wilkerson	8 – Bailey	7 – Enright	Simon Skjodt Assembly Hall (12,549); Bloomington, IN
December 22, 2025*; 6:00 p.m., BTN		Siena	W 81–60	10–3	23 – Wilkerson	11 – DeVries	4 – Tied	Simon Skjodt Assembly Hall (12,647); Bloomington, IN
January 4, 2026; 8:00 p.m., BTN		Washington	W 90–80	11–3 (2–1)	22 – Wilkerson	6 – Alexis	9 – Enright	Simon Skjodt Assembly Hall (12,392); Bloomington, IN
January 7, 2026; 6:30 p.m., BTN		at Maryland	W 84–66	12–3 (3–1)	24 – Wilkerson	8 – Conerway	4 – Conerway	Xfinity Center (12,181); College Park, MD
January 10, 2026; 12:00 p.m., BTN		No. 10 Nebraska	L 77–83	12–4 (3–2)	32 – Wilkerson	9 – Bailey	5 – Conerway	Simon Skjodt Assembly Hall (13,407); Bloomington, IN
January 13, 2026; 7:00 p.m., Peacock/NBCSN		at No. 12 Michigan State	L 60–81	12–5 (3–3)	19 – Wilkerson	7 – Bailey	9 – Conerway	Breslin Student Events Center (14,797); East Lansing, MI
January 17, 2026; 2:00 p.m., FOX		Iowa	L 57–74	12–6 (3–4)	16 – Conerway	8 – Alexis	4 – Conerway	Simon Skjodt Assembly Hall (17,222); Bloomington, IN
January 20, 2026; 7:00 p.m., Peacock/NBCSN		at No. 3 Michigan	L 72–86	12–7 (3–5)	15 – DeVries	4 – Tied	3 – Tied	Crisler Center (12,707); Ann Arbor, MI
January 23, 2026; 6:00 p.m., FS1		at Rutgers	W 82–59	13–7 (4–5)	27 – Wilkerson	10 – Tied	6 – DeVries	Jersey Mike's Arena (8,000); Piscataway, NJ
January 27, 2026; 9:00 p.m., Peacock/NBCSN		No. 12 Purdue; Rivalry/Indiana National Guard Governor's Cup	W 72–67	14–7 (5–5)	19 – Wilkerson	10 – DeVries	8 – Enright	Simon Skjodt Assembly Hall (17,222); Bloomington, IN
January 31, 2026; 5:00 p.m., Peacock/NBCSN		at UCLA	W 98–97 ^{2OT}	15–7 (6–5)	26 – Dorn	10 – DeVries	7 – Tied	Pauley Pavilion (10,086); Los Angeles, CA
February 3, 2026; 10:00 p.m., Peacock/NBCSN		at USC	L 75–81	15–8 (6–6)	33 – Wilkerson	6 – DeVries	8 – Enright	Galen Center (6,353); Los Angeles, CA
February 7, 2026; 12:00 p.m., FOX		Wisconsin	W 78–77 ^{OT}	16–8 (7–6)	25 – Wilkerson	8 – DeVries	6 – Enright	Simon Skjodt Assembly Hall (17,222); Bloomington, IN
February 9, 2026; 8:45 p.m., FS1		Oregon	W 92–74	17–8 (8–6)	41 – Wilkerson	6 – Enright	8 – Enright	Simon Skjodt Assembly Hall (17,222); Bloomington, IN
February 15, 2026; 1:00 p.m., CBS		at No. 8 Illinois; Rivalry	L 51–71	17–9 (8–7)	21 – Wilkerson	8 – Alexis	6 – Enright	State Farm Center (15,544); Champaign, IL
February 20, 2026; 8:00 p.m., FOX		at No. 7 Purdue; Rivalry/Indiana National Guard Governor's Cup	L 64–93	17–10 (8–8)	20 – Wilkerson	3 – Alexis	7 – Conerway	Mackey Arena (14,876); West Lafayette, IN
February 24, 2026; 7:00 p.m., FS1		Northwestern	L 68–72	17–11 (8–9)	18 – Wilkerson	5 – Wilkerson	5 – Enright	Simon Skjodt Assembly Hall (17,222); Bloomington, IN
March 1, 2026; 3:45 p.m., CBS		No. 13 Michigan State	L 64–77	17–12 (8–10)	29 – Wilkerson	6 – Tied	3 – Alexis	Simon Skjodt Assembly Hall (17,222); Bloomington, IN
March 4, 2026; 6:30 p.m., BTN		Minnesota	W 77–47	18–12 (9–10)	23 – Alexis	9 – Tied	8 – Enright	Simon Skjodt Assembly Hall (17,222); Bloomington, IN
March 7, 2026; 5:30 p.m., FOX		at Ohio State	L 78–91	18–13 (9–11)	18 – Wilkerson	5 – Bailey	5 – Tied	Value City Arena (18,809); Columbus, OH
Big Ten Tournament
March 11, 2026; 6:30 p.m., BTN	(10)	vs. (15) Northwestern; Second round	L 61–74	18–14	17 – Wilkerson	8 – DeVries	6 – DeVries	United Center (16,122); Chicago, IL
*Non-conference game. ^{#}Rankings from AP Poll. (#) Tournament seedings in parentheses. All times are in Eastern Time.

== Player statistics ==
Individual player statistics (final)
			Minutes		Scoring		Total FGs			3-point FGs			Free-throws			Rebounds							
Player	GP	GS	Tot	Avg	Pts	Avg	FG	FGA	Pct	3FG	3FGA	Pct	FT	FTA	Pct	Off	Def	Tot	Avg	A	Stl	Blk	TO
Alexis, Sam	32	23	682	21.3	280	8.8	114	166	.687	2	8	.250	50	69	.725	60	92	152	4.8	39	10	38	32
Bailey, Reed	32	10	609	19.0	267	8.3	77	135	.570	1	4	.250	112	148	.757	35	73	108	3.4	35	7	11	28
Conerway, Tayton	29	19	615	21.2	276	9.5	101	180	.561	18	62	.290	56	76	.737	20	60	80	2.8	96	31	5	58
DeVries, Tucker	32	32	1099	34.3	437	13.7	144	363	.397	82	246	.333	67	78	.859	17	151	168	5.2	105	36	18	47
Dorn, Nick	30	12	698	23.3	244	8.1	72	178	.404	60	158	.380	40	46	.870	17	53	70	2.3	9	9	3	22
Enright, Conor	32	32	957	29.9	147	4.6	49	121	.405	26	75	.347	23	29	.793	15	81	96	3.0	148	20	0	39
Grensing, Tryce	11	0	17	1.5	0	0.0	0	1	.000	0	1	.000	0	0	.000	1	0	1	0.1	0	0	0	0
Miles, Jasai	26	0	246	9.5	41	1.6	14	41	.341	6	25	.240	7	14	.500	13	37	50	1.9	11	1	3	12
Ristic, Aleksa	12	0	31	2.6	6	0.5	2	5	.400	2	3	.667	0	1	.000	0	1	1	0.1	0	0	0	2
Sisley. Trent	30	0	396	13.2	126	4.2	46	107	.430	13	48	.271	21	39	.538	24	60	84	2.8	11	3	2	12
Snively, Drew	10	0	17	1.7	4	0.4	2	5	.400	0	1	.000	0	0	.000	0	4	4	0.4	0	0	0	1
Stephens, Ian	12	0	22	1.8	4	0.3	1	1	1.000	0	0	.000	2	2	1.000	0	1	1	0.1	0	1	0	0
Wilkerson, Lamar	32	32	1086	33.9	669	20.9	227	490	.463	104	275	.378	111	125	.888	13	99	112	3.5	77	31	6	51
Total	32		6475	202.3	2501	78.16	849	1793	.474	314	906	.347	489	627	.780	263	774	1037	32.4	531	149	86	325
Opponents	32		6475	202.3	2309	72.16	786	1833	.429	223	674	.331	514	678	.758	320	716	1036	32.4	385	177	90	325

Legend
GP	Games played	GS	Games started	Avg	Average per game
FG	Field-goals made	FGA	Field-goal attempts	Off	Offensive rebounds
Def	Defensive rebounds	A	Assists	TO	Turnovers
Blk	Blocks	Stl	Steals	High	Team high

== Rankings ==
Ranking movements Legend: ██ Increase in ranking ██ Decrease in ranking — = Not ranked RV = Received votes т = Tied with team above or below
	Week																				
Poll	Pre	1	2	3	4	5	6	7	8	9	10	11	12	13	14	15	16	17	18	19	Final
AP	RV	RV	RV	25	22	RV	RV	RV	RV	RV	—	—	—	—	—	—	—	—	—	—	—
Coaches	—	RV	25	24	19т	RV	—	RV	RV	RV	RV	—	—	—	—	—	—	—	—	—	—

== Awards and honors ==
=== Pre-season awards ===
Name	Award	Date
Tucker DeVries	Julius Erving Small Forward of the Year Award Preseason Watchlist	October 29, 2025
Tucker DeVries	Naismith Player of the Year Award Preseason Watchlist	November 3, 2025
Tucker DeVries	Oscar Robertson Player of the Year Award Preseason Watchlist	November 3, 2025

=== In-season awards ===
Name	Award	Date
Tucker DeVries	Big Ten Player of the Week	November 10, 2025
Tucker DeVries	John R. Wooden Award Men's Top 50 Watchlist	November 18, 2025
Lamar Wilkerson	Big Ten Player of the Week	December 15, 2025; February 9, 2026
Lamar Wilkerson	USBWA Oscar Robertson National Player of the Week	December 16, 2025

=== Post-season awards ===
Name	Award	Date
Lamar Wilkerson	All-Big Ten Second Team (Coaches)	March 10, 2026
Lamar Wilkerson	All-Big Ten Third Team (Media)	March 10, 2026
Lamar Wilkerson	NABC All-Great Lakes District First Team	March 17, 2026
Conor Enright	Indiana's Big Ten Sportsmanship Award	March 10, 2026
