= Bryce Lindsay =

American basketball player

No. 2 – Indiana Hoosiers
- Position: Shooting guard
- League: Big Ten Conference

Personal information
- Listed height: 6 ft 4 in (1.93 m)
- Listed weight: 200 lb (91 kg)

Career information
- High school: Saint Frances Academy (Baltimore, Maryland); IMG Academy (Bradenton, Florida)
- College: Texas A&M (2023–2024); James Madison (2024–2025); Villanova (2025–2026); Indiana (2026–present)

Career highlights
- Third-team All-Sun Belt (2025)
Medals
Men's basketball
Representing United States
FISU America Games
Gold medal – first place	2026 Peru	Team competition

Bryce Lindsay is an American college basketball player for the Indiana Hoosiers. He previously played for the Villanova Wildcats, James Madison Dukes, and Texas A&M Aggies.

== Early life ==
Lindsay was raised in Baltimore, Maryland. He is the son of Takisha and Dustin Lindsay. He has an older brother, Brandon, who played for Albright College.

Lindsay was ranked a three-star prospect and the nationally ranked No. 22 combo guard by 247Sports. On January 28, 2022, he committed to South Carolina, before decommitting and choosing Texas A&M on November 9, 2022, over offers from the West Virginia Mountaineers and Villanova Wildcats.

== College career ==
=== Texas A&M ===
Lindsay redshirted his freshman season, averaging 1.8 points in only eight games prior to his injury.

=== James Madison ===
On May 15, 2024, Lindsay transferred to play for the James Madison Dukes. He earned Sun Belt Conference Freshman of the Year honors after averaging 13.4 points, 2.8 rebounds, and 2.2 assists across 31 games and 12 starts. Lindsay earned Sun Belt Player of the Week honors after averaging 18.7 points per game off the bench the week of November 26, 2024. On November 21, 2024, he set a new career high with 28 points against UIC.

=== Villanova ===
Lindsay transferred to Villanova on April 17, 2025. He chose the Wildcats over offers from Indiana, Florida, Clemson, Miami, and USC. Lindsay averaged 12.3 points and 2.1 rebounds per game across 33 games and 31 starts. He scored 25 points in an 86–76 loss to Utah State in the first round of the 2026 NCAA Tournament.

=== Indiana ===
On April 15, 2026, Lindsay transferred to play for the Indiana Hoosiers with two years of eligibility remaining. He had previously been recruited by Indiana prior to his commitment to Villanova.

== National team career ==
Lindsay was a part of the Indiana team chosen to represent the United States in the 2026 FISU America Games in Lima, Peru. He helped the U.S. capture the gold medal after winning all four games with an average victory margin of 60.8 points. Lindsay scored a team-high 17 points in their 99–57 win over the Virgin Islands in the gold medal game.

== Personal life ==
Lindsay's mother, Takisha, died from a Grade II Astrocytoma on November 6, 2022. She was initially diagnosed in 2012.

== Career statistics ==
Legend
GP	Games played	GS	Games started	MPG	Minutes per game
FG%	Field goal percentage	3P%	3-point field goal percentage	FT%	Free throw percentage
RPG	Rebounds per game	APG	Assists per game	SPG	Steals per game
BPG	Blocks per game	PPG	Points per game	**Bold**	Career high

=== College ===
Year	Team	GP	GS	MPG	FG%	3P%	FT%	RPG	APG	SPG	BPG	PPG
2023–24	Texas A&M	8	0	6.9	.333	.182	0.0	0.1	0.6	0.3	0.0	1.8
2024–25	James Madison	31	13	**29.6**	**.455**	**.408**	**.854**	**2.8**	**2.2**	0.6	**0.1**	**13.4**
2025–26	Villanova	**33**	**31**	28.6	.383	.356	.771	2.1	2.1	**0.7**	0.0	12.3
2026–27	Indiana											
Career		72	44	26.6	.415	.377	.789	2.2	2.0	0.6	0.0	11.6
