= Samet Yiğitoğlu =

Turkish basketball player

No. 21 – Indiana Hoosiers
- Position: Center
- League: Big Ten Conference

Personal information
- Born: March 10, 2004 (age 22) Istanbul, Turkey
- Listed height: 7 ft 2 in (2.18 m)
- Listed weight: 270 lb (122 kg)

Career information
- College: SMU (2024–2026); Indiana (2026–present)

Career history
- 2021–2024: Beşiktaş S.J.
- 2023–2024: Sigortam Istanbul

Samet Yiğitoğlu (born March 10, 2004) is a Turkish college basketball player for the Indiana Hoosiers of the Big Ten Conference. He previously played for the SMU Mustangs.

== Early life ==
Yiğitoğlu was born March 10, 2004, in Istanbul, Turkey.

== Professional career ==
Prior to college, Yiğitoğlu spent 3 seasons with Beşiktaş of the Turkish Basketball League. In 2023–24 he averaged 3.1 points and 2.1 rebounds per game, in 2022–23 he averaged 2.3 points and 2.6 rebounds per game, and in 2021–22 he averaged 1.6 points and 2.4 rebounds per game.

In the 2023–24 season, Yiğitoğlu was a member of Sigortam Istanbul, a Turkish professional basketball team in the Turkish Basketball First League, which is the second league behind the Turkish Basketball League. He averaged 13.3 points, 10.3 rebounds, and 1 block per game.

== National team career ==
Yiğitoğlu has represented Turkey at both the U18 and U19 levels.

At the 2023 FIBA U19 Basketball World Cup, Yiğitoğlu helped Turkey to a bronze medal, defeating the USA team for the first time 84–70 in the bronze medal game. Yiğitoğlu had 10 points, 11 rebounds, and 4 blocks.

== College career ==
=== SMU ===
==== 2024 season ====
In Yiğitoğlu's freshman season, he started all 32 games with 3 double-doubles. He scored a career high 20 points against NC State on January 25, 2025.

==== 2025 season ====
In Yiğitoğlu's sophomore year, he started at center all 34 games. He had 7 double-doubles.

On December 3, 2025, Yiğitoğlu scored a season high 16 points in a 69–88 loss to Vanderbilt. On January 7, 2026, Yiğitoğlu scored 14 points and 11 rebounds in a 74–70 loss at Clemson. On February 10, 2026, Yiğitoğlu scored 11 points and 10 rebounds against Notre Dame. In the ACC tournament, he scored 12 points and 11 rebounds in an 86–69 win.

=== Indiana ===
==== 2026 season ====
On April 14, 2026, Yiğitoğlu committed to play for the Indiana Hoosiers with 3 years of eligibility remaining.

While Yiğitoğlu was unable to represent Team USA due to being born in Turkey, he traveled to the FISU America Games with the rest of the Indiana team that represented the United States.

== Career statistics ==
Legend
GP	Games played	GS	Games started	MPG	Minutes per game
FG%	Field goal percentage	3P%	3-point field goal percentage	FT%	Free throw percentage
RPG	Rebounds per game	APG	Assists per game	SPG	Steals per game
BPG	Blocks per game	PPG	Points per game	**Bold**	Career high

=== College ===
Year	Team	GP	GS	MPG	FG%	3P%	FT%	RPG	APG	SPG	BPG	PPG
2024–25	SMU	32	32	24.5	.535	**.200**	**.561**	6.2	1.0	**0.7**	1.0	10.0
2025–26	SMU	**34**	**34**	**28.9**	**.628**	.0	.495	**7.9**	**1.6**	0.5	**1.3**	**10.7**
2026–27	Indiana											
Career		66	66	26.7	.583	.167	.531	7.1	1.3	0.6	1.2	10.4
