= Aiden Sherrell =

American basketball player (born 2004)

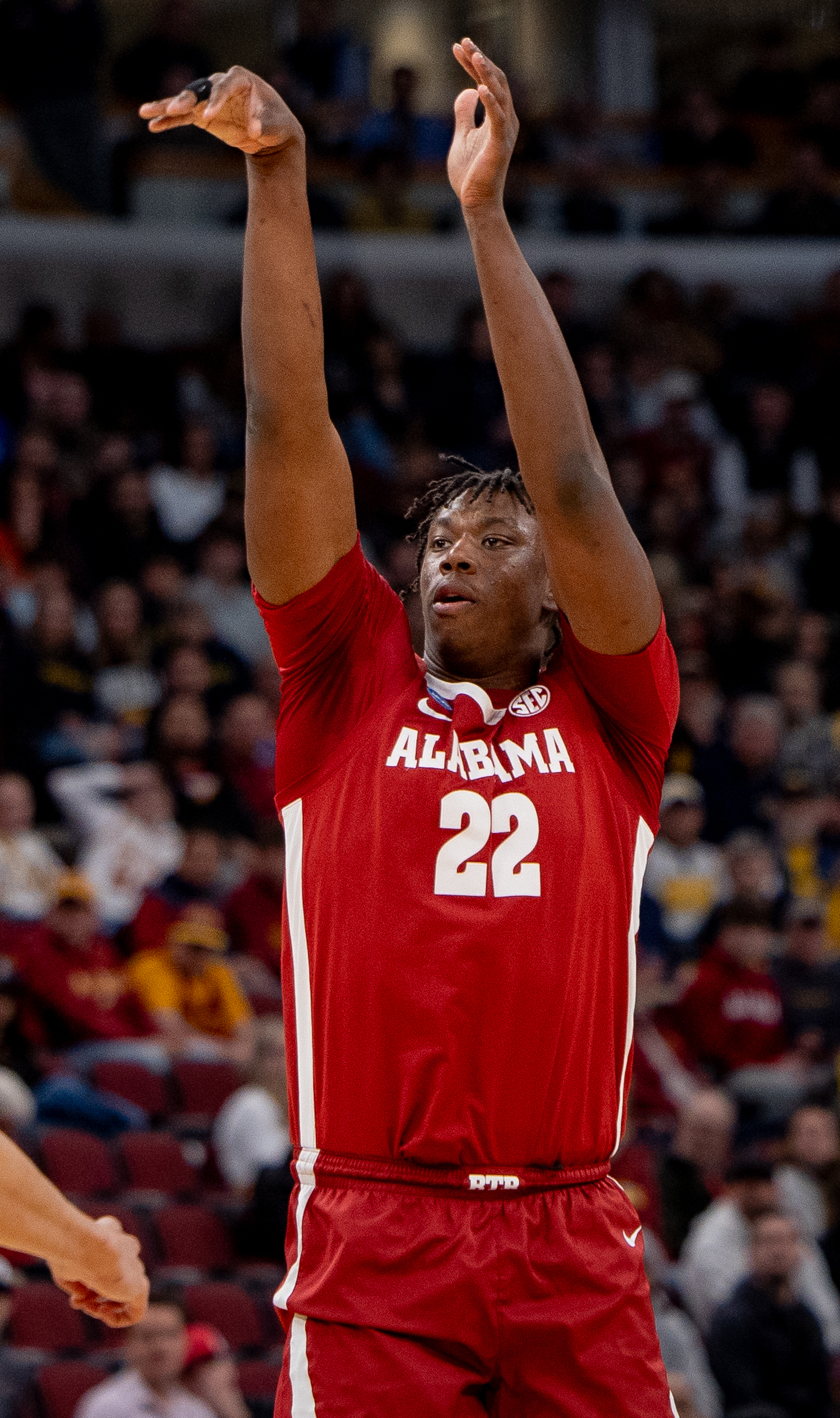

No. 22 – Indiana Hoosiers
- Position: Center
- Conference: Big Ten Conference

Personal information
- Born: December 25, 2004 (age 21)
- Listed height: 7 ft 0 in (2.13 m)
- Listed weight: 250 lb (113 kg)

Career information
- High school: Norcross (Norcross, Georgia); Wasatch Academy (Mount Pleasant, Utah; Hillcrest Prep (Phoenix, Arizona); Prolific Prep (Napa, California)
- College: Alabama (2024–2026); Indiana (2026–present)

Career highlights
- FISU America Games MVP (2026); McDonald's All-American (2024)
Medals
Men's basketball
Representing United States
FISU America Games
Gold medal – first place	2026 Peru	Team competition

Aiden Sherrell (born December 25, 2004) is an American college basketball player for the Indiana Hoosiers of the Big Ten Conference. He previously played for the Alabama Crimson Tide.

== Early life ==
Sherrell grew up in Detroit, Michigan. He initially attended Norcross High School in Norcross, Georgia, before transferring to Wasatch Academy in Mount Pleasant, Utah, after his freshman year. After one year at Wasatch, Sherrell transferred to Hillcrest Prep in Phoenix, Arizona. He averaged 18.8 points and 9.3 rebounds per game in the Bruins' Overtime Elite play. Sherrell transferred a fourth time to Prolific Prep in Napa, California, for his senior season. He was selected to play in the 2024 McDonald's All-American Boys Game during his senior year. Sherrell was rated a five-star recruit and committed to play college basketball at Alabama over offers from Ohio State, Oklahoma, Texas, and Michigan State.

== College career ==
Sherrell played in 36 games, all off the bench, during his freshman season at Alabama and averaged 3.4 points and 2.8 rebounds per game. He entered his sophomore season as the Crimson Tide's starting power forward. Sherrell helped the Crimson Tide reach the Sweet 16 and averaged 11.1 points, 6.2 rebounds, 2.2 blocked shots and 1.1 assists per game. He transferred to Indiana after the season.

== National team career ==
Sherrell was a part of the Indiana team chosen to represent the United States in the 2026 FISU America Games in Lima, Peru. He helped the U.S. capture the gold medal after winning all four games with an average victory margin of 60.8 points. Sherrell posted 10 points and 10 rebounds in their 99–57 win over the Virgin Islands in the gold medal game. He was named the tournament MVP.

== Career statistics ==
Legend
GP	Games played	GS	Games started	MPG	Minutes per game
FG%	Field goal percentage	3P%	3-point field goal percentage	FT%	Free throw percentage
RPG	Rebounds per game	APG	Assists per game	SPG	Steals per game
BPG	Blocks per game	PPG	Points per game	**Bold**	Career high

=== College ===
Year	Team	GP	GS	MPG	FG%	3P%	FT%	RPG	APG	SPG	BPG	PPG
2024–25	Alabama	**36**	0	8.7	.511	.333	.463	2.8	,4	.2	.2	3.4
2025–26	Alabama	34	**34**	**23.9**	**.539**	**.338**	**.713**	**6.2**	**1.1**	**.6**	**2.2**	**11.1**
2026–27	Indiana											
Career		70	34	16.1	.532	.336	.653	4.5	0.7	0.4	1.2	7.2
