= 2026–27 St. John's Red Storm men's basketball team =

American college basketball season

2026–27 St. John's Red Storm men's basketball
- Conference: Big East Conference

Ranking
- Coaches: No. 13
- AP: No. 13
- Record: 5–0 (0–0 Big East)
- Head coach: Rick Pitino (4th season)
- Associate head coach: Steve Masiello
- Assistant coaches: Bob Walsh; Taliek Brown; Ricky Johns; Peyton Siva
- Captains: Ian Jackson; Babacar Sané
- Home arena: Carnesecca Arena; Madison Square Garden

2026–27 Big East men's basketball standings
	Conf.				Overall
Team	W		L	PCT	W		L	PCT
DePaul	0	–	0	–	5	–	0	1.000
Georgetown	0	–	0	–	5	–	0	1.000
No. 13 St. John's	0	–	0	–	5	–	0	1.000
Xavier	0	–	0	–	5	–	0	1.000
Creighton	0	–	0	–	4	–	1	.800
Providence	0	–	0	–	4	–	1	.800
No. 3 UConn	0	–	0	–	4	–	1	.800
Seton Hall	0	–	0	–	3	–	1	.750
Butler	0	–	0	–	3	–	2	.600
Marquette	0	–	0	–	3	–	2	.600
Villanova	0	–	0	–	3	–	2	.600
† 2027 Big East tournament winner As of November 19, 2026; Rankings from AP poll

The 2026–27 St. John's Red Storm men's basketball team will represent St. John's University during the 2026–27 NCAA Division I men's basketball season. They will be coached by Rick Pitino, in is fourth year at the school and 38th overall and play their home games at Carnesecca Arena and Madison Square Garden (MSG) as a member of the Big East Conference.

== Previous season ==
The Red Storm finished the 2025–26 season 30–7, 18–2 in Big East play to finish in first place. As the 1st seed in the Big East Tournament, they would beat 9th seed Providence 85–72 in the Quarterfinals, 4th seed Seton Hall 78–68 in the Semifinals, and 2nd seed (6th rank) UConn in the Championship to win their 5th Conference Tournament Title and would get the automatic bid to the NCAA Tournament. In the Tournament they were the 5th seed in the East Regional, where they would beat 12th seed Northern Iowa 79–53 in the First Round, 4th seed Kansas 67–65 in the Second Round, but would lose the top seed Duke 80–75 in the Sweet 16 ending their season.

== Offseason ==
Departures
Name	Number	Pos.	Height	Weight	Year	Hometown	Reason for departure
Dylan Darling	0	G	6'1"	175	RS Jr.	Spokane, WA	Transferred to Grand Canyon
Dillon Mitchell	1	F	6'8"	210	Sr.	Tampa, FL	Graduated. Declared for 2026 NBA Draft drafted 40th by the Boston Celtics
Sadiku Ibine Ayo	2	F	6'6"	215	Sr.	Asabi-Kumasi, Ghana	Transferred to Iona
Joson Sanon	3	G	6'5"	200	Jr.	Fall River, MA	Transferred to West Virginia
Oziyah Sellers	4	G	6'5"	190	Sr.	Hayward, CA	Graduated. Transferred to SMU
Kelvin Odih	5	G	6'4"	215	Fr.	Providence, RI	Transferred to Fordham
Imran Suljanovic	22	F	6'8"	210	RS Fr.	Vienna, Austria	Transferred to New Mexico
Bryce Hopkins	23	F	6'7"	225	GS	Oak Park, IL	Graduated. Declared for 2026 NBA Draft drafted 49th by the Denver Nuggets
Zuby Ejiofor	24	F	6'9"	245	Sr.	Garland, TX	Graduated. Declared for 2026 NBA Draft drafted 23rd by the Atlanta Hawks
Handje Tamba	44	C	6'11"	240	GS	Kinshasa, DRC	Graduated

Incoming transfers
Name	Num	Pos	Height	Weight	Year	Hometown	Previous school
Babacar Sané	0	F	6'7"	235	Sr.	Bignona, Senegal	Riesen Ludwigsburg
Donnie Freeman	1	F	6'9"	195	Jr.	Washington, D.C.	Syracuse
Avery Brown	3	G	6'2"	190	GS	Beacon Falls, CT	Columbia
Quinn Ellis	4	G	6'5"	200	Sr.	Sheffield, England	Olimpia Milano
Kyle Cuffe Jr.	5	G	6'1"	190	GS	Harlem, New York	Mercer
Keyshawn Hall	7	F	6'7"	230	GS	Cleveland, Ohio	Auburn
Zsombor Maronka	8	F	6'10"	210	Sr.	Szeged, Hungary	Hamburg Towers
Reed Bailey	13	F	6'10"	235	GS	Harvard, MA	Indiana
Tounde Yessoufou	24	G	6'5"	220	So.	Cotonou, Benin	Baylor

=== Recruiting classes ===
==== 2026 recruiting class ====
College recruiting (2026)
Name	Hometown	School	Height	Weight	Commit date
Theo Edema; C	Delta State, Nigeria	Cushing Academy	6 ft 11 in (2.11 m)	255 lb (116 kg)	May 17, 2026
Theo Edema; C	Recruit ratings: 247Sports: ESPN: (81)				
Lazar Stojkovic; PF/C	Belgrade, Serbia	BKK Radnicki	7 ft 1 in (2.16 m)	235 lb (107 kg)	Apr 21, 2026
Lazar Stojkovic; PF/C	Recruit ratings: Rivals: 247Sports: ESPN: (NR)				
Overall recruit ranking:
Note: In many cases, Scout, Rivals, 247Sports, On3, and ESPN may conflict in their listings of height and weight.; In these cases, the average was taken. ESPN grades are on a 100-point scale.; Sources: "2026 Team Ranking". Rivals.

== Preseason ==
The Big East preseason coaches poll was reached on October 1, 2026. All awards were voted on by the league's 11 head coaches, who could not vote for their own team or players.

Big East Preseason Coaches Poll

	Big East Coaches	Points
1.	UConn	98 (8)
2.	St. John's	90 (2)
3.	Villanova	81
4.	Marquette	73 (1)
5.	Providence	59
6.	Xavier	54
7.	Creighton	80
8.	DePaul	32
9.	Seton Hall	31
10.	Georgetown	27
11.	Butler	13
Reference: (#) first-place votes

All-Big East Preseason Selections

Award	Player	Pos	Year	Src
Preseason All-Big East First Team	Ian Jackson	G	Jr.	
Preseason All-Big East First Team	Tounde Yessoufou	G	So.	

Preseason Award Watch Lists

Award	Player	Pos	Year	Src
Bob Cousy Award Top 20	Quinn Ellis	G	Sr.	
Julius Erving Award Top 20	Tounde Yessoufou	G	So.	
Karl Marlone Award Top 20	Keyshawn Hall	G/F	Gr.	
Naismith Trophy Top 50	Tounde Yessoufou	G	So.	

Top 25 Preseason Polls

AP
Ranking	Team
1	Florida (47)
2	Duke (10)
3	Illinois (2)
4	UConn
5	Arizona
6	Michigan State
7	Texas
8	Tennessee
9	Virginia
10	Houston
11	Louisville
12	Arkansas
13	St. John's
14	Miami (FL)
15	Gonzaga
16	Michigan
17	Kansas
18	Iowa State
19	Texas Tech
20	Alabama
21	USC
22	UCLA
23	Kentucky
24	Vanderbilt
25	BYU

USA Today Coaches
Ranking	Team
1	Florida (20)
2	Duke (8)
3	Illinois (2)
4	Arizona
5	UConn
6	Michigan State
7	Texas
8	Houston
9	Tennessee
10	Virginia
11	Louisville
12	Gonzaga
13	Arkansas
14	St. John's
14	Iowa State
16	Texas Tech
17	Miami (FL)
18	Kansas
18	Alabama
20	Michigan
21	Vanderbilt
22	USC
23	Kentucky
24	Purdue
25	BYU

== Roster ==
2026–27 St. John's Red Storm men's basketball team
Players
Coaches

Pos.	#	Name	Height	Weight	Year	Previous school	Hometown
F	0	Babacar Sané	6 ft 7 in (2.01 m)	235 lb (107 kg)	Sr	Riesen Ludwigsburg	Bignona, Senegal
F	1	Donnie Freeman	6 ft 9 in (2.06 m)	195 lb (88 kg)	Jr	Syracuse	Washington, D.C.
G	2	Fotis Konstantinidis	6 ft 2 in (1.88 m)	180 lb (82 kg)	So	Proteas Voulas B.C.	Athens, Greece
G	3	Avery Brown	6 ft 2 in (1.88 m)	190 lb (86 kg)	GS	Columbia	Beacon Falls, Connecticut
G	4	Quinn Ellis	6 ft 5 in (1.96 m)	200 lb (91 kg)	Sr	Olimpia Milano	Sheffield, England
G	5	Kyle Cuffe Jr.	6 ft 1 in (1.85 m)	190 lb (86 kg)	GS	Mercer	Harlem, New York
G	6	Casper Pohto	6 ft 3 in (1.91 m)	190 lb (86 kg)	So	Sunrise Christian Academy	Stockholm, Sweden
F	7	Keyshawn Hall	6 ft 7 in (2.01 m)	230 lb (104 kg)	GS	Auburn	Cleveland, Ohio
F	8	Zsombor Maronka	6 ft 10 in (2.08 m)	210 lb (95 kg)	Sr	Hamburg Towers	Szeged, Hungary
G	11	Ian Jackson	6 ft 5 in (1.96 m)	200 lb (91 kg)	Jr	North Carolina	Bronx, New York
F	13	Reed Bailey	6 ft 10 in (2.08 m)	235 lb (107 kg)	GS	Indiana	Harvard, Massachusetts
F	17	Ruben Prey	6 ft 11 in (2.11 m)	240 lb (109 kg)	Jr	Joventut Badalona	Lisbon, Portugal
C	23	Theo Edema	6 ft 11 in (2.11 m)	255 lb (116 kg)	Fr	Cushing Academy	Delta State, Nigeria
G	24	Tounde Yessoufou	6 ft 5 in (1.96 m)	220 lb (100 kg)	So	Baylor	Cotonou, Benin
C	30	Lazar Stojkovic	7 ft 1 in (2.16 m)	235 lb (107 kg)	Fr	BKK Radnički	Belgrade, Serbia
G	31	Lefteris Liotopoulos	6 ft 4 in (1.93 m)	195 lb (88 kg)	Jr	DEKA Academy	Thessaloniki, Greece

Head coach

- Rick Pitino (UMass)

Assistant coach(es)

- Steve Masiello (Kentucky)
- Bob Walsh (Hamilton)
- Taliek Brown (Connecticut)
- Ricky Johns (Monroe)
- Peyton Siva (Louisville)

Legend

- (C) Team captain
- (S) Suspended
- (I) Ineligible
- (W) Walk-on
- Injured
- Current redshirt

Roster
Last update: October 31, 2026

== Schedule and results ==
Date time, TV	Rank^{#}	Opponent^{#}	Result	Record	High points	High rebounds	High assists	Site (attendance) city, state
Exhibition
October 14, 2026*; 6:00 p.m., ESPN+		Drexel	W 81–52	–	17 – Sané	8 – Sané	6 – Ellis	Carnesecca Arena (5,260); Queens, NY
October 18, 2026*; 12:00 p.m., BTN+		Rutgers	W 104–99 ^{4OT}	–	24 – Tied	14 – Hall	9 – Ellis	Madison Square Garden (11,041); New York, NY
October 25, 2026*; 12:00 p.m., MSG/ESPN+	No. 13	No. 7 Texas	W 87–74	–	24 – Hall	7 – Edema	7 – Ellis	Madison Square Garden (11,011); New York, NY
Non-Conference Regular season
November 2, 2026*; 6:30 p.m., ESPN+	No. 13	Monmouth	W 78–63	1–0	26 – Hall	9 – Hall	7 – Ellis	Carnesecca Arena (5,260); Queens, NY
November 8, 2026*; 12:00 p.m., Peacock	No. 13	Iona	W 104–65	2–0	23 – Yessoufou	7 – Yessoufou	11 – Ellis	Madison Square Garden (13,753); New York, NY
November 11, 2026*; 7:00 p.m., Peacock	No. 13	Colgate	W 90–57	3–0	17 – Tied	8 – Prey	9 – Ellis	Carnesecca Arena (5,260); Queens, NY
November 15, 2026*; 7:00 p.m., Peacock	No. 13	Syracuse	W 79–62	4–0	19 – Yessoufou	14 – Yessoufou	6 – Ellis	Madison Square Garden (16,431); New York, NY
November 18, 2026*; 7:00 p.m., truTV	No. 13	Siena	W 119–72	5–0	22 – Jackson	7 – Yessoufou	10 – Ellis	Carnesecca Arena (5,260); Queens, NY
November 24, 2026*; 10:30 p.m., ESPN		vs. Oregon; Players Era 16 Bracket 1 First Round						Michelob Ultra Arena; Las Vegas, NV
November 26, 2026*; TBA, ESPN Network		vs. Louisville/Texas Tech; Players Era 16 Bracket 1						Michelob Ultra Arena; Las Vegas, NV
November 27, 2026*; TBA, ESPN Network		vs. Players Era 16 Bracket 1						Michelob Ultra Arena; Las Vegas, NV
December 1, 2026*; 6:30 p.m., ESPN+		Columbia						Carnesecca Arena; Queens, NY
December 5, 2026*; 12:00 p.m., FOX		Arizona; Hall of Fame Series New York						Madison Square Garden; New York, NY
December 8, 2026*; 6:30 p.m., ESPN+		Wagner						Carnesecca Arena; Queens, NY
December 12, 2026*; 3:30 p.m., ESPN		at Alabama; CM Newton Classic						Legacy Arena; Birmingham, AL
Big East Regular Season
December 19, 2026; 8:30 p.m., Peacock		DePaul						Madison Square Garden; New York, NY
December 23, 2026; 8:00 p.m., FS1		at Seton Hall						Prudential Center; Newark, NJ
December 30, 2026; 6:00 p.m., FS1		at Providence						Amica Mutual Pavilion; Providence, RI
January 3, 2027; 5:00 p.m., FS1		at Butler						Hinkle Fieldhouse; Indianapolis, IN
January 6, 2027; 7:00 p.m., Peacock		Georgetown						Madison Square Garden; New York, NY
January 13, 2027; 7:00 p.m., Peacock		Providence						Madison Square Garden; New York, NY
January 16, 2027; 3:30 p.m., TNT		at Creighton						CHI Health Center Omaha; Omaha, NB
January 19, 2027; 7:30 p.m., truTV		at DePaul						Wintrust Arena; Chicago, IL
January 23, 2027; 12:00 p.m., Peacock		Seton Hall						Madison Square Garden; New York, NY
January 26, 2027; 8:00 p.m., Peacock		at Xavier						Cintas Center; Cincinnati
January 29, 2027; 8:00 p.m., Peacock		UConn						Madison Square Garden; New York, NY
February 2, 2027; 7:30 p.m., TNT		at Marquette						Fiserv Forum; Milwaukee, WI
February 6, 2027; 12:30 p.m., FOX		at Villanova						Xfinity Mobile Arena; Philadelphia, PA
February 10, 2027; 6:30 p.m., FS1		Creighton						Madison Square Garden; New York, NY
February 13, 2027; 1:00 p.m., NBC		Xavier						Madison Square Garden; New York, NY
February 17, 2027; 7:00 p.m., Peacock		Marquette						Madison Square Garden; New York, NY
February 20, 2027; 1:00 p.m., TNT		at Georgetown						Capital One Arena; Washington, DC
February 23, 2027; 7:00 p.m., TNT		Villanova						Madison Square Garden; New York, NY
February 27, 2027; 1:00 p.m., TNT		Butler						Madison Square Garden; New York, NY
March 2, 2027; 7:30 p.m., TNT		at UConn						PeoplesBank Arena; Hartford, CT
Big East Tournament
*Non-conference game. ^{#}Rankings from AP Poll. (#) Tournament seedings in parentheses. All times are in Eastern Time.

== Rankings ==
Ranking movements Legend: ██ Increase in ranking ██ Decrease in ranking т = Tied with team above or below
	Week																				
Poll	Pre	1	2	3	4	5	6	7	8	9	10	11	12	13	14	15	16	17	18	19	Final
AP	13	13	13																		
Coaches	14т	13	13																		
