= Myles Dorn =

American football player (born 1998)

Profile
- Position: Safety

Personal information
- Born: June 25, 1998 (age 28); Charlotte, North Carolina, U.S.
- Listed height: 6 ft 1 in (1.85 m)
- Listed weight: 214 lb (97 kg)

Career information
- High school: Zebulon B. Vance (Charlotte, North Carolina)
- College: North Carolina (2016–2019)
- NFL draft: 2020: undrafted

Career history
- Minnesota Vikings (2020–2022); Carolina Panthers (2023)*; Miami Dolphins (2023)*; Arlington Renegades (2024–2025)
- * Offseason or practice squad member only

Career NFL statistics
- Total tackles: 5
- Stats at Pro Football Reference

Myles Dorn (born June 25, 1998) is an American professional football safety. He played college football at North Carolina.

== Professional career ==
Pre-draft measurables
Height	Weight	Arm length	Hand span
6 ft 1 1/4 in (1.86 m)	214 lb (97 kg)	30 3/4 in (0.78 m)	8 3/4 in (0.22 m)
All values from Pro Day

=== Minnesota Vikings ===
Dorn was signed by the Minnesota Vikings as an undrafted free agent on April 28, 2020. He suffered a broken toe in the Vikings' final preseason practice and was waived with an injury designation. Dorn reverted to the injured reserve after clearing waivers on September 6, 2020. He was released on August 31, 2021, during final roster cuts and re-signed to the practice squad the next day. Dorn was elevated to the active roster on September 18, 2021, for the team's Week 2 game against the Arizona Cardinals and made his NFL debut in the game. He signed a reserve/future contract with the Vikings on January 10, 2022.

Dorn was waived by the Vikings on August 30, 2022. He was re-signed to the practice squad one day later. He was promoted to the active roster on October 8. He was waived on October 17 and re-signed to the practice squad.

=== Carolina Panthers ===
On January 18, 2023, Dorn signed a reserve/future contract with the Carolina Panthers. He was released on June 30.

=== Miami Dolphins ===
On August 2, 2023, Dorn signed with the Miami Dolphins. He was waived/injured on August 24, and placed on injured reserve.

=== Arlington/Dallas Renegades ===
Dorn signed with the Arlington Renegades of the United Football League on January 24, 2024. He was released on March 19, 2026.

== Personal life ==
Dorn's father, Torin Dorn, played defensive back at North Carolina and in the NFL for seven seasons.

Myles’ younger brother Nick Dorn plays basketball at Indiana University.
