= Heritage Hills High School =

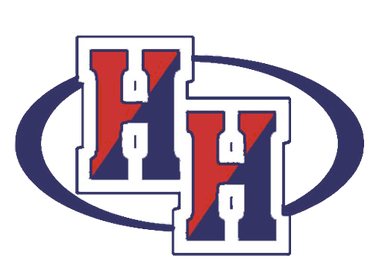

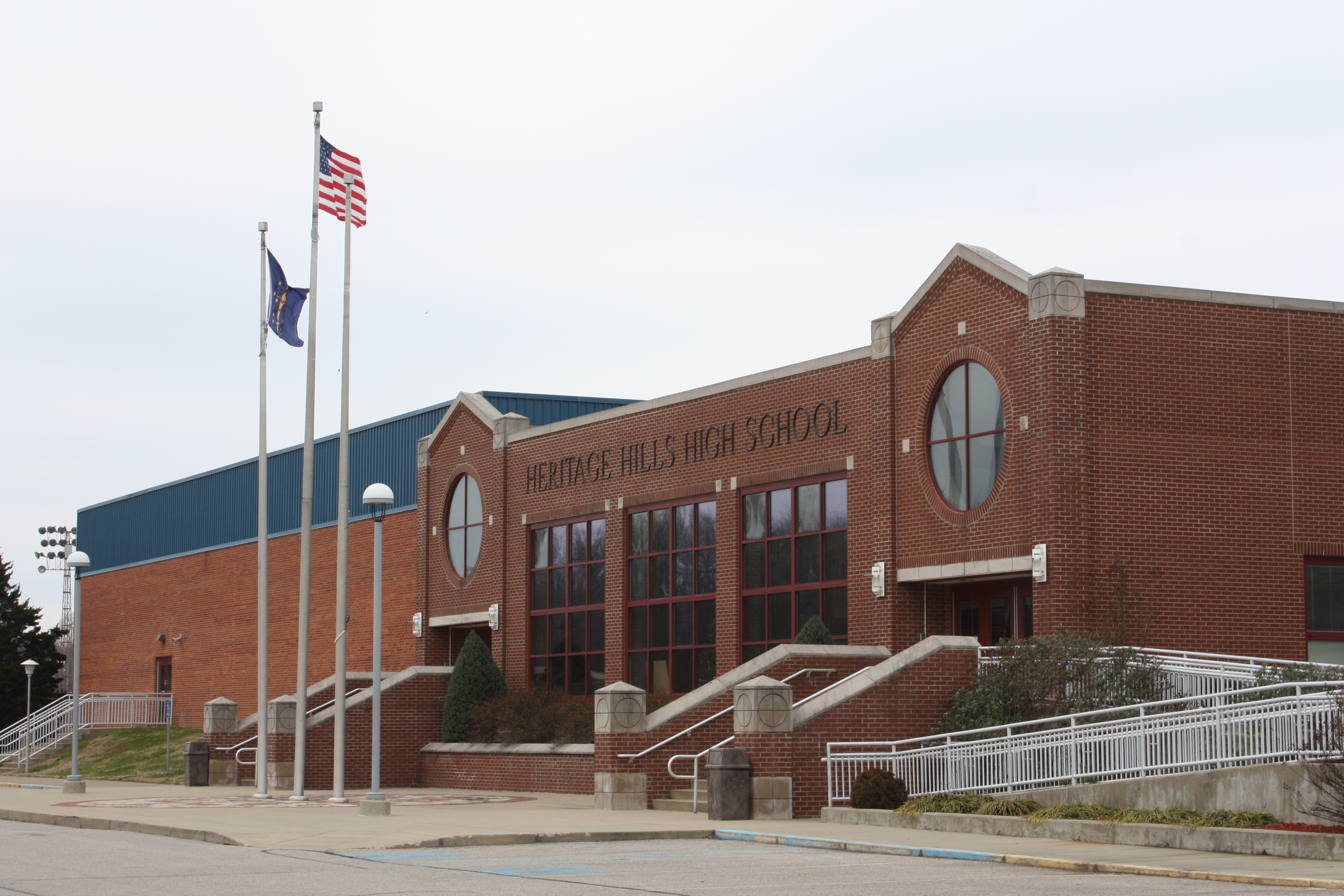

Location
- 3644 East County Road 1600 North; Lincoln City, Indiana 47552; United States; 38°07′11″N 86°59′14″W

Information
- Type: Public secondary school
- Established: 1972
- School district: North Spencer School Corporation
- Principal: Kate Kress
- Faculty: 43.00 (on an FTE basis)
- Grades: 9–12
- Enrollment: 635 (2023-2024)
- Student to teacher ratio: 14.77
- Colors: Red, white and blue
- Athletics conference: Pocket Athletic Conference
- Nickname: Patriots
- Website: hhhs.nspencer.k12.in.us

Heritage Hills High School is a public high school located in Lincoln City, Indiana, United States. It serves students in grades 9-12 for the North Spencer School Corporation.

== History ==
The board of trustees of the North Spencer County School Corporation selected the name for a new high school in November 1971. Heritage Hills High School in Lincoln City, Indiana, was established in 1972, combining Dale High School with Chrisney High School. Students from Dale and Chrisney merged in the new building that opened in January 1973 and was dedicated in November that year.

The school was built on part of the land grant originally owned by Thomas and Nancy Hanks Lincoln.

In 1997, the school board hired Construction Control Inc. of Fort Wayne to manage renovation and construction at Heritage Hills, including construction of a middle school as well as complete renovation of the existing high school and industrial arts buildings and remodeling of the school's athletic facilities. Early estimates of costs exceeding $13.5 million were revised to $12.5 million once the design phase was completed. Work began in March 1999, and according to Superintendent Ron Etienne, the original building had few permanent walls to accommodate an "open classroom" concept of school design, a concept out of favor more than two decades later. In 2001, renovations and remodeling were completed.

In May 2020, long-time principal Nick Alcorn was honored on his retirement, following 32 years in administration, teaching, and coaching at Heritage Hills. The new administration includes Principal Jeff Cochren, Assistant Principal since 2009, and newly hired Assistant Principal Kate Kress.

== Curriculum ==
Three diplomas are offered: Indiana Core 40, Core 40 with academic honors, and Core 40 with technical honors. The state's Core 40 Curriculum was implemented beginning with the class of 2009, requiring more specific academic coursework in quantitative reasoning and language arts. Advance Placement and Career Technical courses are also offered, as well as articulation agreements for transfer coursework with Ivy Tech Community College and Vincennes University.

Heritage High is accredited by the North Central Association of Colleges and Schools.

== Demographics ==
The demographic breakdown of the 601 students enrolled for 2018-19 was:

- Male - 51.2%
- Female - 48.8%
- Asian - 0.4%
- Black - 1.0%
- Hispanic - 7.3%
- White - 90.3%
- Multiracial - 0.8%
- Unknown - 0.2%

46.3% of the students were eligible for free or reduced-cost lunch. For 2018–19, Heritage Hills was a Title I school.

== Predecessor Schools ==
Chrisney High School was a public high school located in Chrisney, Indiana, United States. It started as a two-year high school in 1893–94, being housed in the two-story four-room brick town school building constructed in 1881. The school earned its commission in 1908. A gymnasium and classrooms were added in 1930 and another addition occurred in 1941. The school team name was the Wildcats and the colors were black & orange. The school was closed in 1972.

Dale High School was a public high school located in Dale, Indiana, United States. It was built in 1908, and was renovated in 1926 and 1951. The school team name was the Golden Aces and the colors were black & gold. The school was closed in 1972.

== Athletics ==
Since its foundation, Heritage Hills has been a member of the Pocket Athletic Conference. The school participates in basketball, baseball, football, cross country (girls' and boys'), golf (girls' and boys'), soccer (girls' and boys'), swimming and diving (girls' and boys'), tennis (girls' and boys'), track and field (girls' and boys'), and wrestling (girls' and boys'). Meticulous records of the Patriots' accomplishments have been kept.

Notably, Bob Clayton coached the football team from 1978 to 2011 compiling a 320–74 record. He was inducted into the Indiana Football Hall of Fame in 2012.

State Championships
| Sport | Year(s) |
|---|---|
| Football (2) | 2000-01, 2024-25 |
| Singles tennis (girls') | 1996 |

== Notable alumni ==
- Terry Brahm – Olympic long-distance runner
- Jay Cutler – NFL quarterback
- Ken Dilger – NFL tight end
- Stephanie Hazlett – Professional tennis player
- Bruce King – NFL fullback
- Trent Sisley - College basketball player

== See also ==
- List of high schools in Indiana
