= E. J. Drayton =

American basketball player (born 1982)

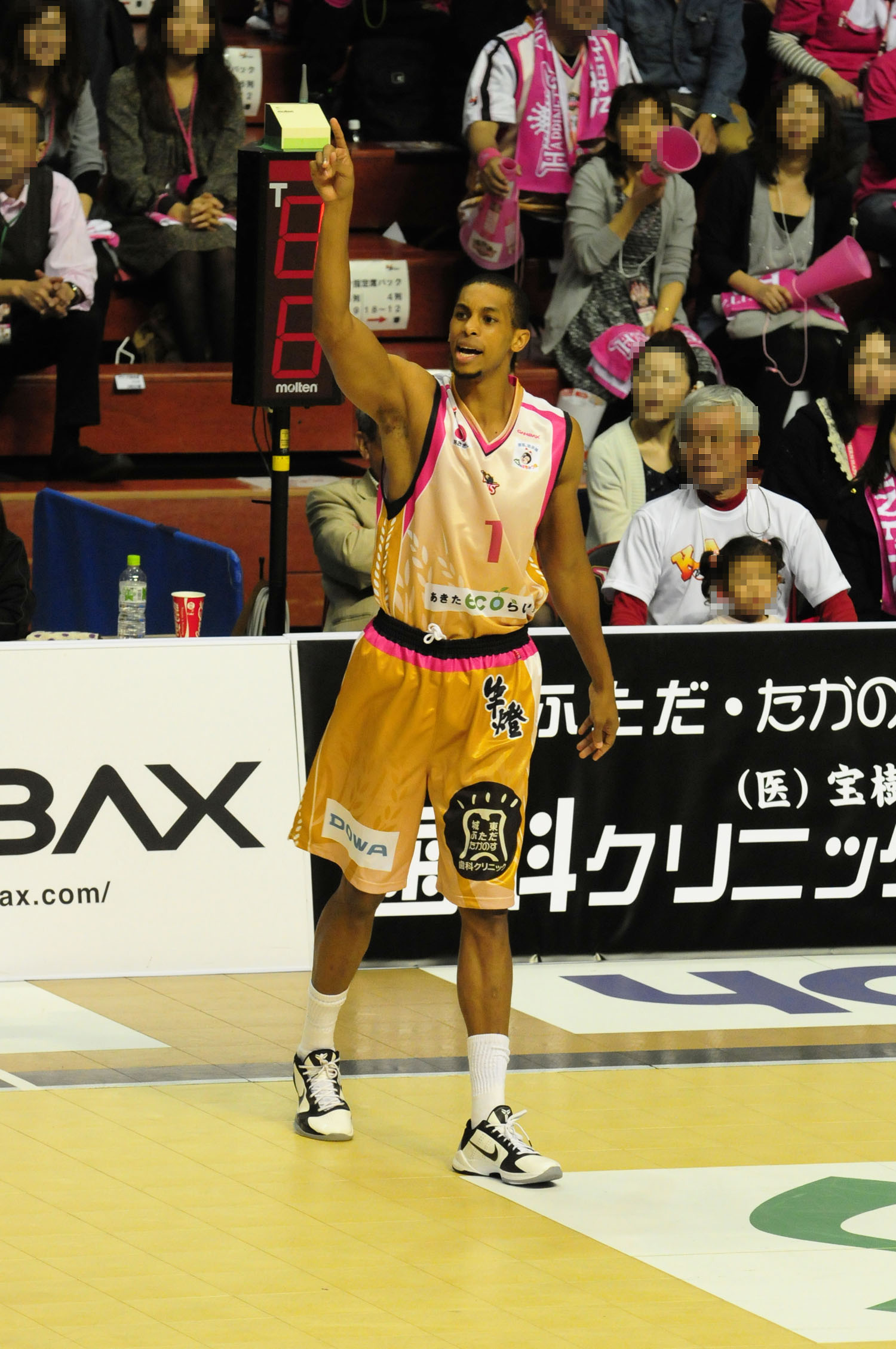
- Drayton at Akita Municipal Gymnasium

Personal information
- Born: December 13, 1982 (age 43)
- Listed height: 204 cm (6 ft 8 in)
- Listed weight: 98 kg (216 lb)

Career information
- High school: Bonner Academy (Raleigh, North Carolina); Zebulon B. Vance (Charlotte, North Carolina)
- College: Colby CC (2003–2004); Charlotte (2004–2007)
- NBA draft: 2007: undrafted
- Playing career: 2007–2014
- Position: Forward
- Number: 1

Career history
- 2007–2008: Barreirense Basket
- 2008: Porvoon Tarmo
- 2008: Torpan Pojat Helsinki
- 2008: Atletico Atenas
- 2008–2009: Hapoel Yokneam Megido
- 2009–2010: Maccabi Be'er Ya'akov
- 2010–2011: Ironi Nahariya
- 2011–2012: Akita Northern Happinets
- 2013–2014: Union Dax-Gamarde

E. J. Drayton (born December 13, 1982) is an American former professional basketball player for the Akita Northern Happinets of the Japanese bj league.

== College statistics ==
Year	Team	GP	GS	MPG	FG%	3P%	FT%	RPG	APG	SPG	BPG	PPG
2003–04	Colby											
2004–05	Charlotte	29	4	22.8	.367	.358	.779	4.62	1.24	0.52	0.21	8.66
2005–06	Charlotte	6	2	17.7	.267	.111	.571	3.33	1.67	0.83	0.17	4.17
2006–07	Charlotte	30	30	33.6	.482	.341	.578	8.43	1.30	0.53	0.53	13.67
Career		65	36	27.3	.425	.333	.641	6.26	1.31	0.55	0.35	10.55

== Career statistics ==
Legend
GP	Games played	GS	Games started	MPG	Minutes per game
FG%	Field goal percentage	3P%	3-point field goal percentage	FT%	Free throw percentage
RPG	Rebounds per game	APG	Assists per game	SPG	Steals per game
BPG	Blocks per game	PPG	Points per game	**Bold**	Career high

=== Regular season ===
Year	Team	GP	GS	MPG	FG%	3P%	FT%	RPG	APG	SPG	BPG	PPG
2008–09	Helsinki Seagulls	1		31.0	.455	.500	.750	8.0	1.0	2.0	0.0	17.0
2008–09	Porvoo	8		31.6	.485	.286	.794	9.4	0.5	0.8	0.3	18.8
2010–11	Nahariya	13		28.6	.448	.238	.682	7.4	1.1	0.7	0.8	11.1
2011–12	Akita	50	16	20.9	.471	.000	.629	5.6	1.3	1.0	0.7	10.4

=== Playoffs ===
Year	Team	GP	GS	MPG	FG%	3P%	FT%	RPG	APG	SPG	BPG	PPG
2011–12	Akita	4		22.0	.406	.000	.500	5.0	1.5	1.0	0.3	8.0
