= Paul Troth (quarterback) =

American football player and coach (born 1982)

Current position
- Title: Offensive coordinator
- Team: John Champe HS (VA)

Biographical details
- Born: August 19, 1982 (age 44)

Playing career
- 1998–2000: Zebulon B. Vance HS
- 2001–2003: East Carolina
- 2004: Liberty
- Position: Quarterback

Coaching career (HC unless noted)
- 2006–2007: East Carolina (GA)
- 2008–2009: Campbell (WR)
- 2010–2011: Harnett Central HS (NC) (OC)
- 2012–2016: Dominion HS (VA) (OC)
- 2017–present: John Champe HS (VA) (OC)

Paul Troth (born August 19, 1982) is a former college football quarterback and coach. Troth played his high school prep career at Vance High School in Charlotte, North Carolina. Troth was recruited to play at ECU before transferring to Liberty University. He later served as a graduate assistant coach at ECU.

== Statistics ==
Year	Team	Games			Passing								Rushing			
Year	Team	GP	GS	Record	Cmp	Att	Pct	Yds	Avg	TD	Int	Rtg	Att	Yds	Avg	TD
2001	East Carolina	3	0	0−0	1	4	25.0	5	1.3	0	0	35.5	0	0	0.0	0
2002	East Carolina	12	12	4−8	177	359	49.3	2,315	6.4	15	20	106.1	61	-210	-3.4	1
2003	East Carolina	6	0	0−0	34	69	49.3	380	5.5	1	4	88.7	14	-61	-4.4	0
2004	Liberty	6	6	2−4	57	118	48.3	694	5.9	1	7	88.6	25	-55	-2.2	1
Career		27	18	6−12	269	550	48.9	3,394	6.2	17	31	99.7	100	-326	-3.3	2
