= 2024–25 Alabama Crimson Tide men's basketball team =

American college basketball season

2024–25 Alabama Crimson Tide men's basketball

NCAA tournament, Elite Eight
- Conference: Southeastern Conference

Ranking
- Coaches: No. 6
- AP: No. 6
- Record: 28–9 (13–5 SEC)
- Head coach: Nate Oats (6th season)
- Assistant coaches: Preston Murphy (2nd season); Ryan Pannone (2nd season); Brian Adams (1st season)
- Home arena: Coleman Coliseum

2024–25 Southeastern Conference men's basketball standings
	Conf.				Overall
Team	W		L	PCT	W		L	PCT
No. 4 Auburn	15	–	3	.833	32	–	6	.842
No. 1 Florida †	14	–	4	.778	36	–	4	.900
No. 6 Alabama	13	–	5	.722	28	–	9	.757
No. 5 Tennessee	12	–	6	.667	30	–	8	.789
No. 19 Texas A&M	11	–	7	.611	23	–	11	.676
No. 12 Kentucky	10	–	8	.556	24	–	12	.667
Missouri	10	–	8	.556	22	–	12	.647
No. 18 Ole Miss	10	–	8	.556	24	–	12	.667
No. 20 Arkansas	8	–	10	.444	22	–	14	.611
Mississippi State	8	–	10	.444	21	–	13	.618
Georgia	8	–	10	.444	20	–	13	.606
Vanderbilt	8	–	10	.444	20	–	13	.606
Texas	6	–	12	.333	19	–	16	.543
Oklahoma	6	–	12	.333	20	–	14	.588
LSU	3	–	15	.167	14	–	18	.438
South Carolina	2	–	16	.111	12	–	20	.375
† 2025 SEC tournament winner Rankings from AP poll

The 2024–25 Alabama Crimson Tide men's basketball team represented the University of Alabama during the 2024–25 NCAA Division I men's basketball season. The Crimson Tide were led by sixth-year head coach Nate Oats and played their home games at Coleman Coliseum located in Tuscaloosa, Alabama as a member of the SEC.

== Previous season ==
The Crimson Tide finished the 2023–24 season with a record of 25–12, 13–5 in SEC play to finish in a tie for second place. They were defeated by Florida Gators in the quarterfinals of the SEC tournament championship. They received an at-large bid to the NCAA tournament as the number four seed in the West Region, where they beat Charleston in the first round, Grand Canyon in the second round to advance to the Sweet Sixteen, where they upset the one seed North Carolina, where they would then advance to the Final Four for the first time in school history beating Clemson but were defeated by the eventual national champions, the UConn Huskies.

== Offseason ==
=== Departures ===
Name	Number	Pos.	Height	Weight	Year	Hometown	Reason for departure
Kris Parker	0	G	6'9"	195	Freshman	Tallahassee, FL	Transferred to Villanova
Rylan Griffen	3	G	6'6"	190	Sophomore	Dallas, TX	Transferred to Kansas
Davin Cosby Jr.	4	G	6'5"	205	(redshirt) Freshman	Richmond, VA	Transferred to Wake Forest
Mohamed Wague	11	F	6'10"	225	Junior	Bronx, NY	Transferred to Oklahoma
Nick Pringle	23	F	6'10"	230	Senior	Seabrook, SC	Graduate transferred to South Carolina
Sam Walters	24	F	6'10"	198	Freshman	The Villages, FL	Transferred to Michigan
Kai Spears	32	G	6'2"	160	Sophomore	Pittsburgh, PA	Walk-on; transferred to Marshall
Ward Harrell	33	F	6'7"	220	Freshman	New Braunfels, TX	Walk-on; left the team
Aaron Estrada	55	G	6'3"	190	GS Senior	Woodbury, NJ	Graduated/undrafted in 2024 NBA draft; signed with the Detroit Pistons

=== Incoming transfers ===
Name	Number	Pos.	Height	Weight	Year	Hometown	Previous School
Aden Holloway	2	G	6'1"	180	Sophomore	Charlotte, NC	Auburn
Chris Youngblood	8	G	6'4"	218	GS Senior	Tuscaloosa, AL	South Florida
Clifford Omoruyi	11	C	6'11"	240	GS Senior	Benin City, Nigeria	Rutgers
Houston Mallette	95	G	6'5"	185	Senior	Alameda, CA	Pepperdine

=== 2024 Recruiting class ===
College recruiting information
Name	Hometown	School	Height	Weight	Commit date
Derrion Reid #2 SF	Grovetown, GA	Prolific Prep	6 ft 7 in (2.01 m)	200 lb (91 kg)	Dec 22, 2023
Derrion Reid #2 SF	Recruit ratings: Rivals: 247Sports: ESPN: (92)				
Aiden Sherrell #3 C	Detroit, MI	Prolific Prep	6 ft 11 in (2.11 m)	220 lb (100 kg)	Sep 26, 2023
Aiden Sherrell #3 C	Recruit ratings: Rivals: 247Sports: ESPN: (89)				
Labaron Philon Jr. #10 PG	Mobile, AL	Link Academy	6 ft 2 in (1.88 m)	180 lb (82 kg)	Apr 28, 2024
Labaron Philon Jr. #10 PG	Recruit ratings: Rivals: 247Sports: ESPN: (89)				
Naasir Cunningham #21 SF	West Orange, NJ	Southern California Academy	6 ft 7 in (2.01 m)	195 lb (88 kg)	Nov 7, 2023
Naasir Cunningham #21 SF	Recruit ratings: Rivals: 247Sports: ESPN: (86)				
Overall recruit ranking:
Note: In many cases, Scout, Rivals, 247Sports, On3, and ESPN may conflict in their listings of height and weight.; In these cases, the average was taken. ESPN grades are on a 100-point scale.; Sources: "2024 Alabama Commits". Rivals.; "2024 Team Ranking". Rivals.

=== 2025 Recruiting class ===
College recruiting information (2025)
Name	Hometown	School	Height	Weight	Commit date
London Jemison #9 Power forward	Bloomfield, CT	St. Thomas More School	6 ft 7 in (2.01 m)	195 lb (88 kg)	Sep 22, 2024
London Jemison #9 Power forward	Recruit ratings: Rivals: 247Sports: On3: ESPN: (86)				
Davion Hannah #11 Shooting guard	Milwaukee, WI	Link Academy (MO)	6 ft 4 in (1.93 m)	180 lb (82 kg)	Nov 15, 2024
Davion Hannah #11 Shooting guard	Recruit ratings: Rivals: 247Sports: On3: ESPN: (86)				
Amari Allen #39 Small forward	Green Bay, WI	IMG Academy (FL)	6 ft 5 in (1.96 m)	180 lb (82 kg)	Sep 10, 2024
Amari Allen #39 Small forward	Recruit ratings: Rivals: 247Sports: On3: ESPN: (81)				
Collins Onyejiaka*; Center	Edo, Nigeria	The Newman School (MA)	6 ft 11 in (2.11 m)	270 lb (120 kg)	Jun 20, 2025
Collins Onyejiaka*; Center	Recruit ratings: Rivals: 247Sports: On3: ESPN: (n/a)				
Overall recruit ranking:
Note: In many cases, Scout, Rivals, 247Sports, On3, and ESPN may conflict in their listings of height and weight.; In these cases, the average was taken. ESPN grades are on a 100-point scale.; Sources: "Alabama 2025 Basketball Commitments". Rivals.; "2025 Alabama Crimson Tide Recruiting Class". ESPN.; "2025 Team Ranking". Rivals.; "2025 Alabama 24/7 Sports Commits". 247Sports.; "2025 Alabama Crimson Tide Basketball Industry Comparison Commits". On3.

- Onyejiaka reclassified from the class of 2026 to 2025 in committing.

== Roster ==
2024–25 Alabama Crimson Tide men's basketball team
Players
Coaches

Pos.	#	Name	Height	Weight	Year	Previous school	Hometown
G	0	Labaron Philon Jr.	6 ft 4 in (1.93 m)	177 lb (80 kg)	Fr	Link Academy (MO)	Mobile, AL
G	1	Mark Sears	6 ft 1 in (1.85 m)	190 lb (86 kg)	GS	Ohio	Muscle Shoals, AL
G	2	Aden Holloway	6 ft 1 in (1.85 m)	180 lb (82 kg)	So	Auburn	Charlotte, NC
G	3	Latrell Wrightsell Jr. (injured)	6 ft 3 in (1.91 m)	195 lb (88 kg)	GS	Cal State Fullerton	Omaha, NE
F	4	Grant Nelson	6 ft 11 in (2.11 m)	230 lb (104 kg)	GS	North Dakota State	Devils Lake, ND
G	8	Chris Youngblood	6 ft 4 in (1.93 m)	223 lb (101 kg)	GS	South Florida	Tuscaloosa, AL
F	10	Mouhamed Dioubate	6 ft 7 in (2.01 m)	215 lb (98 kg)	So	Putnam Science Academy	Queens, NY
C	11	Clifford Omoruyi	6 ft 11 in (2.11 m)	250 lb (113 kg)	GS	Rutgers	Benin City, Nigeria
F	15	Jarin Stevenson	6 ft 11 in (2.11 m)	215 lb (98 kg)	So	Seaforth HS	Chapel Hill, NC
F	22	Aiden Sherrell	6 ft 10 in (2.08 m)	240 lb (109 kg)	Fr	Prolific Prep	Detroit, MI
F	24	Naas Cunningham (redshirt)	6 ft 7 in (2.01 m)	175 lb (79 kg)	Fr	Southern California Academy	Orange, NJ
F	35	Derrion Reid	6 ft 8 in (2.03 m)	220 lb (100 kg)	Fr	Prolific Prep	Grovetown, GA
F	45	Max Scharnowski (W)	6 ft 6 in (1.98 m)	205 lb (93 kg)	GS	Wheaton Academy	Elgin, IL
G	95	Houston Mallette	6 ft 5 in (1.96 m)	200 lb (91 kg)	Sr	Pepperdine	Alameda, CA

Head coach

- Nate Oats (Maranatha Baptist)

Assistant coach(es)

- Preston Murphy (Rhode Island)
- Ryan Pannone (South Florida)
- Brian Adams (Connecticut College)

Legend

- (C) Team captain
- (S) Suspended
- (I) Ineligible
- (W) Walk-on
- Injured
- Current redshirt

Roster

== Schedule and results ==
Date time, TV	Rank^{#}	Opponent^{#}	Result	Record	High points	High rebounds	High assists	Site (attendance) city, state
Exhibition
October 18, 2024*; 7:00 p.m., YouTube	No. 2	vs. Wake Forest	W 98–77		20 – Holloway	6 – Tied	6 – Tied	Boutwell Memorial Auditorium (2,068); Birmingham, AL
October 28, 2024*; 7:00 p.m., ESPN+	No. 2	vs. Memphis; Rocket City Classic	W 96–88		20 – Sears	10 – Omoruyi	7 – Philon	Propst Arena (6,652); Huntsville, AL
Non-conference regular season
November 4, 2024*; 8:00 p.m., ESPNU	No. 2	UNC Asheville	W 110–54	1–0	20 – Sears	9 – Sherrell	9 – Philon	Coleman Coliseum (13,474); Tuscaloosa, AL
November 8, 2024*; 7:00 p.m., SECN+/ESPN+	No. 2	Arkansas State	W 88–79	2–0	19 – Sears	9 – Omoruyi	3 – Philon	Coleman Coliseum (13,474); Tuscaloosa, AL
November 11, 2024*; 6:00 p.m., SECN	No. 2	McNeese	W 72–64	3–0	22 – Nelson	7 – Tied	5 – Sears	Coleman Coliseum (13,474); Tuscaloosa, AL
November 15, 2024*; 6:00 p.m., Peacock	No. 2	at No. 13 Purdue	L 78–87	3–1	18 – Philon	11 – Nelson	6 – Sears	Mackey Arena (14,876); West Lafayette, IN
November 20, 2024*; 8:00 p.m., SECN	No. 8	vs. No. 25 Illinois; C.M. Newton Classic	W 100–87	4–1	23 – Nelson	8 – Nelson	9 – Philon	Legacy Arena (11,533); Birmingham, AL
November 26, 2024*; 7:00 p.m., TBS	No. 9	vs. No. 6 Houston; Players Era Festival Impact Tournament	W 85–80 ^{OT}	5–1	24 – Sears	16 – Dioubate	3 – Tied	MGM Grand Garden Arena (7,602); Paradise, NV
November 27, 2024*; 9:00 p.m., TBS	No. 9	vs. Rutgers; Players Era Festival Impact Division	W 95–90	6–1	24 – Sears	9 – Nelson	5 – Sears	MGM Grand Garden Arena; Paradise, NV
November 30, 2024*; 8:30 p.m., TNT/TruTV	No. 9	vs. Oregon; Players Era Festival Championship	L 81–83	6–2	15 – Philon	7 – Tied	6 – Nelson	MGM Grand Garden Arena; Paradise, NV
December 4, 2024*; 6:15 p.m., ESPN	No. 10	at No. 20 North Carolina; ACC–SEC Challenge	W 94–79	7–2	20 – Sears	9 – Nelson	7 – Sears	Dean Smith Center (21,750); Chapel Hill, NC
December 14, 2024*; 7:30 p.m., SECN	No. 7	Creighton	W 83–75	8–2	27 – Sears	10 – Nelson	4 – Sears	Coleman Coliseum (13,474); Tuscaloosa, AL
December 18, 2024*; 8:00 p.m., CBSSN	No. 6	at North Dakota	W 97–90	9–2	23 – Tied	10 – Nelson	5 – Sears	Betty Engelstad Sioux Center (3,085); Grand Forks, ND
December 22, 2024*; 12:00 p.m., SECN	No. 6	Kent State	W 81–54	10–2	16 – Sears	14 – Nelson	5 – Philon	Coleman Coliseum (12,198); Tuscaloosa, AL
December 29, 2024*; 2:00 p.m., SECN+/ESPN+	No. 5	South Dakota State	W 105–82	11–2	26 – Holloway	11 – Dioubate	6 – Philon	Coleman Coliseum (13,474); Tuscaloosa, AL
SEC regular season
January 4, 2025; 5:00 p.m., SECN	No. 5	No. 12 Oklahoma	W 107–79	12–2 (1–0)	22 – Sears	11 – Nelson	10 – Sears	Coleman Coliseum (13,474); Tuscaloosa, AL
January 8, 2025; 6:00 p.m., SECN	No. 5	at South Carolina	W 88–68	13–2 (2–0)	22 – Sears	7 – Nelson	6 – Sears	Colonial Life Arena (11,115); Columbia, SC
January 11, 2025; 7:00 p.m., ESPN	No. 5	at No. 10 Texas A&M	W 94–88	14–2 (3–0)	27 – Sears	10 – Omoruyi	7 – Philon	Reed Arena (12,997); College Station, TX
January 14, 2025; 6:00 p.m., ESPNU	No. 4	No. 21 Ole Miss	L 64–74	14–3 (3–1)	15 – Holloway	8 – Nelson	5 – Sears	Coleman Coliseum (13,474); Tuscaloosa, AL
January 18, 2025; 11:00 a.m., ESPN	No. 4	at No. 8 Kentucky	W 102–97	15–3 (4–1)	25 – Nelson	11 – Nelson	9 – Sears	Rupp Arena (21,108); Lexington, KY
January 21, 2025; 6:00 p.m., SECN	No. 4	Vanderbilt	W 103–87	16–3 (5–1)	22 – Tied	10 – Dioubate	7 – Sears	Coleman Coliseum (13,474); Tuscaloosa, AL
January 25, 2025; 7:30 p.m., SECN	No. 4	LSU	W 80–73	17–3 (6–1)	19 – Holloway	9 – Omoruyi	3 – Tied	Coleman Coliseum (13,474); Tuscaloosa, AL
January 29, 2025; 8:00 p.m., SECN	No. 4	at No. 14 Mississippi State	W 88–84	18–3 (7–1)	23 – Youngblood	9 – Dioubate	9 – Sears	Humphrey Coliseum (9,283); Starkville, MS
February 1, 2025; 3:00 p.m., ESPN2	No. 4	Georgia	W 90–69	19–3 (8–1)	20 – Sears	11 – Omoruyi	6 – Sears	Coleman Coliseum (13,474); Tuscaloosa, AL
February 8, 2025; 7:30 p.m., ESPN	No. 3	at Arkansas	W 85–81	20–3 (9–1)	15 – Tied	5 – Tied	4 – Holloway	Bud Walton Arena (19,200); Fayetteville, AR
February 11, 2025; 8:00 p.m., ESPN	No. 2	at Texas	W 103–80	21–3 (10–1)	22 – Stevenson	8 – Omoruyi	4 – Philon	Moody Center (11,081); Austin, TX
February 15, 2025; 3:00 p.m., ESPN	No. 2	No. 1 Auburn; Rivalry/College GameDay	L 85–94	21–4 (10–2)	18 – Sears	12 – Tied	2 – Tied	Coleman Coliseum (13,474); Tuscaloosa, AL
February 19, 2025; 8:00 p.m., SECN	No. 4	at No. 15 Missouri	L 98–110	21–5 (10–3)	35 – Sears	10 – Dioubate	5 – Sears	Mizzou Arena (15,061); Columbia, MO
February 22, 2025; 5:00 p.m., ESPN	No. 4	No. 17 Kentucky	W 96–83	22–5 (11–3)	30 – Sears	15 – Omoruyi	4 – Sears	Coleman Coliseum (13,474); Tuscaloosa, AL
February 25, 2025; 8:00 p.m., ESPN2	No. 6	No. 24 Mississippi State	W 111–73	23–5 (12–3)	27 – Youngblood	11 – Dioubate	10 – Sears	Coleman Coliseum (13,474); Tuscaloosa, AL
March 1, 2025; 3:00 p.m., ESPN	No. 6	at No. 5 Tennessee	L 76–79	23–6 (12–4)	24 – Sears	12 – Nelson	4 – Tied	Thompson–Boling Arena (22,392); Knoxville, TN
March 5, 2025; 6:00 p.m., ESPN2	No. 7	No. 5 Florida	L 94–99	23–7 (12–5)	30 – Sears	7 – Omoruyi	5 – Sears	Coleman Coliseum (13,474); Tuscaloosa, AL
March 8, 2025; 1:30 p.m., ESPN	No. 7	at No. 1 Auburn; Rivalry	W 93–91 ^{OT}	24–7 (13–5)	23 – Nelson	8 – Tied	7 – Sears	Neville Arena (9,121); Auburn, AL
SEC tournament
March 14, 2025; 8:30 p.m., SECN	(3) No. 5	vs. (6) No. 15 Kentucky; Quarterfinals	W 99–70	25–7	21 – Philon	8 – Dioubate	4 – Tied	Bridgestone Arena (18,608); Nashville, TN
March 15, 2025; 2:30 p.m., ESPN	(3) No. 5	vs. (2) No. 4 Florida; Semifinals	L 82–104	25–8	14 – Youngblood	12 – Dioubate	5 – Philon	Bridgestone Arena (19,049); Nashville, TN
NCAA tournament
March 21, 2025*; 11:40 a.m., TruTV	(2 E) No. 7	vs. (15 E) Robert Morris; First Round	W 90–81	26–8	22 – Sears	10 – Dioubate	10 – Sears	Rocket Arena (15,985); Cleveland, OH
March 23, 2025*; 5:10 p.m., TNT	(2 E) No. 7	vs. (7 E) No. 20 Saint Mary's; Second Round	W 80–66	27–8	13 – Youngblood	11 – Omoruyi	5 – Philon	Rocket Arena (15,791); Cleveland, OH
March 27, 2025*; 6:10 p.m., CBS	(2 E) No. 7	vs. (6 E) No. 17 BYU; Sweet Sixteen	W 113–88	28–8	34 – Sears	10 – Nelson	8 – Sears	Prudential Center (18,617); Newark, NJ
March 29, 2025*; 7:49 p.m., TBS	(2 E) No. 7	vs. (1 E) No. 1 Duke; Elite Eight	L 65–85	28–9	16 – Philon	7 – Nelson	6 – Sears	Prudential Center (18,793); Newark, NJ
*Non-conference game. ^{#}Rankings from AP poll. (#) Tournament seedings in parentheses. All times are in Central Time.

== Rankings ==
Ranking movements Legend: ██ Increase in ranking ██ Decrease in ranking ( ) = First-place votes
	Week																				
Poll	Pre	1	2	3	4	5	6	7	8	9	10	11	12	13	14	15	16	17	18	19	Final
AP	2 (14)	2 (6)	8	9	10	7	6	5	5	5	4	4	4	3	2 (23)	4	6	7	5	7	6
Coaches	2 (6)	2 (4)	7	9	12	8	7	6	6	5	5	3	4	3	1 (15)	4	6	8	8	8	6
