= Reed Bailey =

American basketball player

No. 13 – St. John's Red Storm
- Position: Forward
- Conference: Big East Conference

Personal information
- Born: October 2, 2002 (age 24) Harvard, Massachusetts, U.S.
- Listed height: 6 ft 10 in (2.08 m)
- Listed weight: 235 lb (107 kg)

Career information
- High school: Brewster Academy (Wolfeboro, New Hampshire)
- College: Davidson (2022–2025); Indiana (2025–2026); St. John's (2026-present)

Reed Bailey is an American college basketball player for the St. John's Red Storm of the Big East Conference. He previously played for the Indiana Hoosiers and Davidson Wildcats.

== Early life ==
Bailey was born in Harvard, Massachusetts on October 2, 2002. While in high school, he played football for two years and was a three-year letter winner in basketball. In 2021, he participated in the John Wall Holiday Invitational.

== College career ==
=== Davidson ===
==== 2022–23 season ====
In his first college basketball game, Bailey scored 10 points in an 87-64 win against the Guilford Quakers on November 7, 2022. He made a season-high 20 points in an 89-80 win over San Francisco on November 25, 2022. On January 7, 2023, Bailey made a season-high 9 rebounds in a 72-89 loss against VCU.

==== 2023–24 season ====
On January 17, 2024, Bailey scored a then career-high 24 points in a 79-69 win over Fordham, also pulling in 12 rebounds. He was the second player in Davidson Wildcats history to have multiple games 11/11 or better from the free throw line, sharing the record with Stephen Curry..

==== 2024–25 season ====
Bailey was named to the All-A10 First Team and earned the A10 Conference Most-Improved Player award after leading the league in scoring with 18.9 points per game.

=== Indiana ===
==== 2025–26 season ====
Bailey committed to play for the Hoosiers on April 6, 2025.

=== St. John's ===
==== 2026–27 season ====
Bailey committed to play for the St. John's Red Storm on August 19, 2026 with one year of eligibility remaining. He had received an additional year of eligibility following an injunction granted by Judge Charlotte Sweeney that granted eligibility to many players from the high school class of 2022.

== Personal life ==
Bailey's mother, Linda, played volleyball for the Pittsburgh Panthers, while his father, Nathan, played basketball at both Navy and Pitt. One of his older sisters, Brooke, played volleyball for Ohio State, where she was an OSU Scholar-Athlete, and for Clemson, where she was named Second Team All-ACC. His other older sister, Gabi, played beach volleyball at LSU, having previously spent time at Charleston and Penn State, where she played indoor volleyball. His brother, Evan, played basketball for Charleston, where he won the 2018 CAA men's basketball tournament.

== Career statistics ==
Legend
GP	Games played	GS	Games started	MPG	Minutes per game
FG%	Field goal percentage	3P%	3-point field goal percentage	FT%	Free throw percentage
RPG	Rebounds per game	APG	Assists per game	SPG	Steals per game
BPG	Blocks per game	PPG	Points per game	**Bold**	Career high

=== College ===
Year	Team	GP	GS	MPG	FG%	3P%	FT%	RPG	APG	SPG	BPG	PPG
2022–23	Davidson	32	32	22.7	.496	.345	.644	2.8	0.8	0.3	0.1	5.5
2023–24	Davidson	32	32	28.3	.424	.217	**.804**	5.8	1.4	**0.7**	0.3	12.7
2024–25	Davidson	**33**	**33**	**33.3**	.477	**.415**	.768	**6.1**	**3.8**	**0.7**	**0.8**	**18.8**
2025–26	Indiana	32	10	19.1	**.570**	.250	.757	3.4	1.1	0.2	0.3	8.3
2026–27	St. John's											
Career		129	107	25.9	.476	.306	.766	4.5	1.8	0.5	0.4	11.4
