= Nick Dorn =

American basketball player

No. 3 – Miami Hurricanes
- Position: Shooting guard
- League: Atlantic Coast Conference

Personal information
- Listed height: 6 ft 7 in (2.01 m)
- Listed weight: 222 lb (101 kg)

Career information
- High school: Julius L. Chambers (Charlotte, North Carolina)
- College: Elon (2023–2025); Indiana (2025–2026); Miami (Florida) (2026–present)

Nick Dorn is an American college basketball player for the Miami Hurricanes of the Atlantic Coast Conference (ACC). He previously played for the Elon Phoenix and Indiana Hoosiers.

== Early life and high school career ==
Throughout his career at Chambers High School, Dorn averaged 10.9 points, 1.6 assists, 2.6 rebounds, and 1 steal per game, averaging 15.9 ppg his senior season.

== College career ==
=== Elon ===
Dorn committed to play for the Elon Phoenix on March 31, 2023, and enrolled on June 30, 2023.

In his freshman season, Dorn earned four CAA Rookie of the Week awards.

In his sophomore year, Dorn was named the CAA player of the week the week of November 25 after averaging 18 points and 5 rebounds per game in wins against NIU and Notre Dame. He earned a career high 29 points against Marshall on December 28, 2024.

=== Indiana ===
Dorn committed to play for the Indiana Hoosiers on April 24, 2025. He had also considered the North Carolina Tarheels, Pittsburgh Panthers, and Maryland Terrapins.

Dorn scored a season high 26 points against UCLA on February 1, 2026.

=== Miami ===
On May 1, 2026, Dorn transferred to play for the Miami Hurricanes with one year of eligibility remaining.

== Personal life ==
Dorn's father, Torin Dorn, played college football for the North Carolina Tarheels, and professional football for the Los Angeles Raiders and St. Louis Rams. His older brother, Torin Dorn Jr., played college basketball for the NC State Wolfpack and Charlotte 49ers, and professional basketball for BK Lions Jindrichuv Hradec, Śląsk Wrocław, and the Edmonton Stingers. Another older brother, Myles Dorn, played college football for the North Carolina Tarheels, and professionally for the Minnesota Vikings, Carolina Panthers, and Arlington Renegades. Dorn's mother, Rhonda, died on April 18, 2023.

== Career statistics ==
Legend
GP	Games played	GS	Games started	MPG	Minutes per game
FG%	Field goal percentage	3P%	3-point field goal percentage	FT%	Free throw percentage
RPG	Rebounds per game	APG	Assists per game	SPG	Steals per game
BPG	Blocks per game	PPG	Points per game	**Bold**	Career high

=== College ===
Year	Team	GP	GS	MPG	FG%	3P%	FT%	RPG	APG	SPG	BPG	PPG
2023–24	Elon	**30**	22	23.2	.392	.364	.750	3.1	0.5	0.5	**0.1**	9.4
2024–25	Elon	25	**25**	**30.8**	.374	.351	.805	**3.8**	**0.8**	0.3	0.0	**15.2**
2025-26	Indiana	**30**	12	23.2	**.404**	**.380**	**.870**	2.3	0.3	0.3	**0.1**	8.1
Career		85	59	25.4	.388	.363	.808	3.0	0.5	0.4	0.1	10.7
