= Julius L. Chambers High School =

American public school in North Carolina

Location
- 7600 IBM Drive; Charlotte, North Carolina 28262; United States; 35°18′01″N 80°46′11″W

Information
- Former names: Zebulon B. Vance High School (1997–2021)
- Type: Public
- Established: 1997 (29 years ago)
- School district: Charlotte-Mecklenburg Schools
- CEEB code: 340708
- Principal: Travares Hicks
- Teaching staff: 117.46 (FTE)
- Enrollment: 2,225 (2024–2025)
- Student to teacher ratio: 18.94
- Colors: Navy blue and orange
- Athletics: NCHSAA 8A
- Athletics conference: Meck Power Six 7A/8A
- Mascot: Cougar
- Accreditation: AdvancED
- Website: chambershs.cmsk12.org

Julius L. Chambers High School, is a high school located in Charlotte, North Carolina, United States. It is part of the Charlotte-Mecklenburg School System, and opened in 1997. The sports teams are known as the Cougars.

Besides providing the standard state-mandated high school curriculum, the school also has an engineering academy, which gives advanced training to students interested in engineering careers.

== History ==
The school was originally named after Zebulon Baird Vance (1830–1894), a Confederate military officer in the American Civil War, slave owner, twice Governor of North Carolina, and U.S. Senator. In June 2020, as a result of the George Floyd protests, the Charlotte-Mecklenburg School Board officially stated that they had started the process to rename the school to remove the association with the Confederacy.

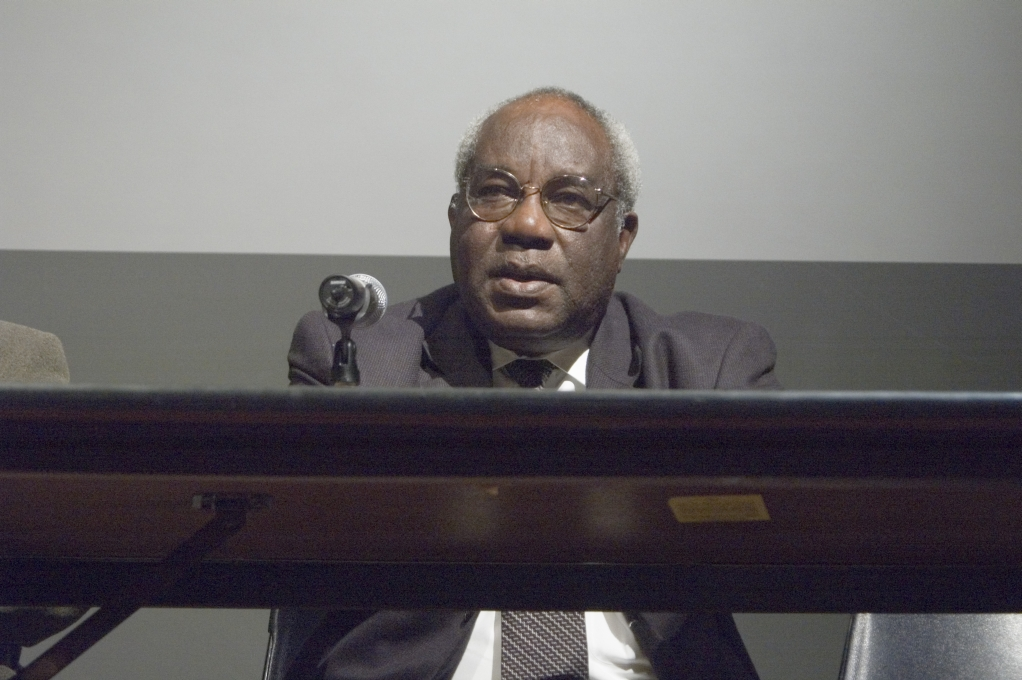
Julius L. Chambers at the University of North Carolina at Chapel Hill, February 13, 2007

In October 2020, the Charlotte-Mecklenburg School board decided to name the school after Julius L. Chambers (1936–2013), who was a famous lawyer, civil rights leader, and educator from North Carolina. The school officially changed its name in a ceremony on July 14, 2021.

== Athletics ==
Chambers High School is a member of the North Carolina High School Athletic Association (NCHSAA) and is classified as a 8A school. It is a part of the Meck Power Six 7A/8A Conference. Their team name is the "Cougars." The school colors are navy blue and orange.

=== Sporting achievements ===
On May 8, 2021 (Covid Season), the football team won its second straight North Carolina 4AA (North Carolina's former highest classification for football) state championship, in its third straight appearance in the 4AA championship game.

== Notable alumni ==
- KC Concepcion, NFL wide receiver
- DaBaby, rapper
- Myles Dorn, NFL safety
- Nick Dorn, college basketball player
- E. J. Drayton, professional basketball player
- Chavis Holmes, professional basketball player
- Travis Holmes, professional basketball player
- James Pearce Jr., NFL linebacker
- Paul Troth, American football coach
