= Lamar Wilkerson =

American basketball player (born 2001)

Free agent
- Position: Shooting guard

Personal information
- Born: November 17, 2001 (age 24) Ashdown, Arkansas, U.S.
- Listed height: 6 ft 6 in (1.98 m)
- Listed weight: 205 lb (93 kg)

Career information
- High school: Ashdown (Ashdown, Arkansas)
- College: Three Rivers (2021–2022); Sam Houston (2022–2025); Indiana (2025–2026)
- NBA draft: 2026: undrafted
- Playing career: 2026–present

Career highlights
- Second-team All-Big Ten (2026); 2× First-team All-Conference USA (2024, 2025)
- Stats at NBA.com
- Stats at Basketball Reference

Lamar Wilkerson is an American basketball player. He played college basketball for the Three Rivers Raiders, Sam Houston Bearkats and Indiana Hoosiers.

== Early life and high school ==
Wilkerson attended Ashdown High School in Ashdown, Arkansas, and committed to play college basketball at Three Rivers College.

== College career ==
=== Three Rivers College ===
As a freshman in 2021–22, Wilkerson averaged 16.7 points and 4.5 rebounds per game.

=== Sam Houston ===
Wilkerson transferred to play for the Sam Houston Bearkats. In 2022-23, he averaged 7.4 points and 3.0 rebounds per game. In the 2023-24 season, Wilkerson averaged 13.8 points, 3.6 rebounds, and 1.0 steal per game. On December 3, 2024, he scored 18 points in a loss to Indiana. Wilkerson finished the 2024-25 season averaging 20.5 points, 4.0 rebounds, and 1.1 steals per game. After the season, he entered the NCAA transfer portal.

=== Indiana ===
Wilkerson transferred to play for the Indiana Hoosiers. On December 9, he totaled a career-high 44 points and made a program-record 10 three-pointers to go with four rebounds, four assists, and three steals in a win over Penn State. On January 4, 2026, Wilkerson scored 22 points in a victory against Washington. On January 7, he put up 24 points in a victory versus Maryland.
