= FISU America Games =

International college athletics event

- Purpose: Multi-sport event for college athletes from nations on the American continents
- Frequency: Every two years
- Inaugurated: São Paulo, Brazil in 2018
- Most recent: Cali, Colombia in 2024
- Next event: Lima, Peru in 2026
- Headquarters: Montevideo, Uruguay
- Website: https://www.fisuamerica.com/

The FISU America Games (Spanish: Juegos FISU América, Portuguese: Jogos FISU América) is a continental multi-sport event between college athletes from countries of the Americas. It was first held in 2018 to provide additional competition for athletes before the global FISU World University Games, also known as the Universiade.

Its regional predecessor for South America, the South American University Games (Spanish: Juegos Universitarios Sudamericanos, Portuguese: Jogos Universitários Sul-Americanos), was first held in 2004 and originally scheduled on a quadrennial basis, but after 2010 it was held irregularly.

== Editions ==
=== South American University Games ===
Year	Edition	City	Country	Nations	Athletes	Sports	Champion
2004	1	Concepción	Chile	8	~500	5	
2006	2	Curitiba	Brazil	8	~900	8	Brazil
2010	3	Curitiba	Brazil	5	350	3	Brazil
2016	4	Buenos Aires	Argentina	7	1000	9	Argentina
2017	5	Bogotá	Colombia	6	400	6	Colombia
2019	6	Concepción	Chile	6	400	6	Colombia

=== FISU America Games ===
Year	Edition	City	Country	Nations	Athletes	Sports	Champion
2018	1	São Paulo	Brazil	13	~1500	10	Brazil
2022	2	Mérida	Mexico	12		11	Mexico
2024	3	Cali	Colombia	12	~1000	17	Brazil
2026	4	Lima	Peru	19	2000	15	United States

== Sports ==
- Athletics
- Basketball
- Beach volleyball
- Chess
- Football
- Futsal
- Handball
- Karate
- Judo
- Rugby sevens
- Swimming
- Table tennis
- Taekwondo
- Tennis
- Volleyball
- Weightlifting

=== Programme ===
Sport	South American University Games				FISU America Games
Sport	2004	2006	2010	2016	2026
Athletics	X	X		X	X
Basketball	X	X		X	X
Beach volleyball					X
Chess					X
Football	X	X	X	X	X
Futsal				X	X
Handball				X	X
Judo		X			X
Karate					X
Rugby sevens					X
Swimming		X		X	X
Table tennis	X	X		X	X
Taekwondo		X			X
Tennis			X	X	
Volleyball	X	X	X	X	X
Weightlifting					X
