= 2024–25 Georgetown Hoyas men's basketball team =

American college basketball season

2024–25 Georgetown Hoyas men's basketball

College Basketball Crown, Quarterfinals
- Conference: Big East Conference
- Record: 18–16 (8–12 Big East)
- Head coach: Ed Cooley (2nd season)
- Associate head coach: Jeff Battle (2nd season)
- Assistant coaches: Brian Blaney (2nd season); Walt Corbean (2nd season); LaDontae Henton (2nd season); Kenny Johnson (1st season)
- Home arena: Capital One Arena; McDonough Gymnasium

2024–25 Big East men's basketball standings
	Conf.				Overall
Team	W		L	PCT	W		L	PCT
No. 11 St. John's †	18	–	2	.900	31	–	5	.861
Creighton	15	–	5	.750	25	–	11	.694
UConn	14	–	6	.700	24	–	11	.686
Xavier	13	–	7	.650	22	–	12	.647
Marquette	13	–	7	.650	23	–	11	.676
Villanova	11	–	9	.550	21	–	15	.583
Georgetown	8	–	12	.400	18	–	16	.529
Providence	6	–	14	.300	12	–	20	.375
Butler	6	–	14	.300	15	–	20	.429
DePaul	4	–	16	.200	14	–	20	.412
Seton Hall	2	–	18	.100	7	–	25	.219
† 2025 Big East tournament winner Rankings from AP Poll

The 2024–25 Georgetown Hoyas men's basketball team represented Georgetown University in the 2024–25 NCAA Division I men's basketball season. The Hoyas, led by second-year head coach Ed Cooley, were members of the Big East Conference. The Hoyas played their home games in Washington, D.C., at both Capital One Arena and McDonough Gymnasium.

The team's performance was markedly better than in the previous several seasons. Georgetown finished the season with a record of 18-16 while going 8–12 in Big East play to finish the year in seventh place in the conference. This marked the Hoyas' first year with a winning record and highest finish in Big East play since the 2018-19 season. In the Big East Tournament, the Hoyas lost to DePaul in the first round. At the conclusion of the season, Georgetown was selected to play in the inaugural College Basketball Crown tournament. The Hoyas defeated Washington State for their first postseason victory since 2015 before ending their season with a loss to Nebraska in the second round. Following the season Thomas Sorber and Micah Peavy were selected in the NBA Draft, marking the first time that two Hoyas players were selected in the same draft since 2008.

== Previous season ==
After cutting ties with head coach Patrick Ewing in 2023 after six years at the helm, the Hoyas played their first season under head coach Ed Cooley, who had left the head coaching position at Big East rival Providence College to come to Georgetown. Under Cooley, the Hoyas had their third historically bad season in a row in 2023–24, starting 7–4 in non-conference games but finishing the season 9–23 overall and 2–18 in Big East play. They finished in 10th place in the 11-team conference. In the Big East tournament, they lost to Providence in the first round, bringing their season to an end.

== Offseason ==
=== Departures ===
Departures
Name	No.	Pos.	Height	Weight	Year	Hometown	Reason for departure
Dontrez Styles	0	F	6'6"	212	Junior	Kinston, NC	Transferred to NC State
Rowan Brumbaugh	1	G	6'4"	183	RS Freshman	Washington, DC	Transferred to Tulane
Jay Heath	5	G	6'3"	209	Senior	Washington, DC	Graduated
Cam Bacote	11	G	6'3"	176	Graduate student	Hampton, VA	Completed eligibility
Ryan Mutombo	21	C	7'2"	259	Junior	Atlanta, GA	Transferred to Georgia Tech
Donovan Grant	22	G	6'6"	200	Junior	Atlanta, GA	Left team in December 2023
Supreme Cook	24	F	6'9"	220	Senior	East Orange, NJ	Transferred to Oregon
Ismael Massoud	25	F	6'9"	213	Graduate student	East Harlem, NY	Completed eligibility
Wayne Bristol, Jr.	31	G	6'6"	195	Senior	Upper Marlboro, MD	Transferred to Hampton
Jonathan Kaczor	34	G	6'2"	220	Graduate student	Potomac, MD	Completed eligibility
Victor Muresan	55	F	6'11"	173	Senior	Potomac, MD	Left team in December 2023

=== Incoming transfers ===
Incoming Transfers
Name	No.	Pos.	Height	Weight	Year	Hometown	Previous School
Malik Mack	2	G	6'1"	160	Sophomore	Oxon Hill, MD	Harvard
Micah Peavy	5	G	6'7"	220	Graduate Student	Cibolo, TX	TCU
Curtis Williams Jr.	11	G/F	6'5"	180	Sophomore	Detroit, MI	Louisville
Jordan Burks	23	SF	6'8"	200	Sophomore	Phoenix, AZ	Kentucky

=== 2024 recruiting class ===
College recruiting information
Name	Hometown	School	Height	Weight	Commit date
Kayvaun Mulready #14 SG	Worcester, MA	Worcester Academy	6 ft 4 in (1.93 m)	195 lb (88 kg)	Mar 28, 2023
Kayvaun Mulready #14 SG	Recruit ratings: Rivals: 247Sports: ESPN: (83)				
Caleb Williams #43 PF	Washington, DC	Sidwell Friends School	6 ft 7 in (2.01 m)	215 lb (98 kg)	Jun 25, 2023
Caleb Williams #43 PF	Recruit ratings: Rivals: 247Sports: ESPN: (81)				
Thomas Sorber #10 C	Trenton, NJ	Archbishop Ryan High School	6 ft 9 in (2.06 m)	250 lb (110 kg)	May 17, 2024
Thomas Sorber #10 C	Recruit ratings: Rivals: 247Sports: ESPN: (87)				
Seal Diouf #52 C	Gouda, Netherlands	The Dunn School	6 ft 8 in (2.03 m)	215 lb (98 kg)	Jul 23, 2024
Seal Diouf #52 C	Recruit ratings: Rivals: 247Sports: ESPN: (NR)				
Julius Halaifonua #14 C	Auckland, New Zealand	NBA Global Academy (Australia)	7 ft 0 in (2.13 m)	290 lb (130 kg)	Aug 5, 2024
Julius Halaifonua #14 C	Recruit ratings: Rivals: 247Sports: ESPN: (NR)				
Jayden Fort; PF	Washington, DC	Jackson-Reed High School	6 ft 8 in (2.03 m)	185 lb (84 kg)	Aug 9, 2024
Jayden Fort; PF	Recruit ratings: Rivals: 247Sports: ESPN: (82)				
Overall recruit ranking:
Note: In many cases, Scout, Rivals, 247Sports, On3, and ESPN may conflict in their listings of height and weight.; In these cases, the average was taken. ESPN grades are on a 100-point scale.; Sources: "2024 Georgetown Signees". ESPN.; "2024 Team Ranking". Rivals.

== Roster ==
Georgetown announced its 2024–25 roster on September 23, 2024.

2024–25 Georgetown Hoyas men's basketball team
Players
Coaches

Pos.	#	Name	Height	Weight	Year	Previous school	Hometown
F	0	Jayden Fort (redshirt)	6 ft 9 in (2.06 m)	200 lb (91 kg)	Fr	Jackson-Reed High School	Washington, DC
G	2	Malik Mack	6 ft 2 in (1.88 m)	175 lb (79 kg)	So	Harvard	Oxon Hill, MD
F	4	Caleb Williams	6 ft 7 in (2.01 m)	230 lb (104 kg)	Fr	Sidwell Friends School	Washington, DC
G/F	5	Micah Peavy	6 ft 8 in (2.03 m)	220 lb (100 kg)	GS	TCU	Cibolo, TX
F	7	Drew McKenna	6 ft 8 in (2.03 m)	220 lb (100 kg)	RS Fr	Glenelg Country School	Laurel, MD
G	10	Jayden Epps	6 ft 2 in (1.88 m)	190 lb (86 kg)	Jr	Illinois	Norfolk, VA
G	11	Curtis Williams, Jr.	6 ft 6 in (1.98 m)	205 lb (93 kg)	So	Louisville	Detroit, MI
F	14	Austin Montgomery (W)	6 ft 6 in (1.98 m)	205 lb (93 kg)	Jr	LSU	New Orleans, LA
G	15	Hashem Asadallah (W)	6 ft 2 in (1.88 m)	189 lb (86 kg)	So	American School of Kuwait	Jabriya, Kuwait
F/C	20	Drew Fielder	6 ft 11 in (2.11 m)	235 lb (107 kg)	So	Southern California Academy	Boise, ID
G	22	Mason Moses (W)	6 ft 6 in (1.98 m)	202 lb (92 kg)	Fr	Brewster Academy	New York City, NY
F	23	Jordan Burks	6 ft 9 in (2.06 m)	205 lb (93 kg)	So	Kentucky	Decatur, AL
C	25	Julius Halaifonua (injured)	7 ft 0 in (2.13 m)	270 lb (122 kg)	Fr	NBA Global Academy (Australia)	Auckland, New Zealand
G	30	Michael Van Raaphorst (W)	6 ft 2 in (1.88 m)	210 lb (95 kg)	Fr	Delbarton School	Chatham, NJ
C	34	Seal Diouf (redshirt)	6 ft 9 in (2.06 m)	255 lb (116 kg)	Fr	The Dunn School	Gouda, Netherlands
F/C	35	Thomas Sorber (injured)	6 ft 10 in (2.08 m)	255 lb (116 kg)	Fr	Archbishop Ryan High School	Trenton, NJ
G	45	Kayvaun Mulready	6 ft 4 in (1.93 m)	220 lb (100 kg)	Fr	Worcester Academy	Worcester, MA

Head coach

- Ed Cooley (Stonehill)

Assistant coach(es)

- Jeff Battle (Marshall)
- Brian Blaney (Roanoke)
- Walt Corbean (Xavier)
- LaDontae Henton (Providence)
- Kenny Johnson (Maryland)

Legend

- (C) Team captain
- (S) Suspended
- (I) Ineligible
- (W) Walk-on
- Injured
- Current redshirt

Roster

== Season recap ==
=== Non-conference season ===
Georgetown played 11 non-conference games between November 6 and December 28, finishing 9–2 in nonconference play. The non-conference schedule included the Hoyas playing in the final year of the Big East–Big 12 Battle, facing former Big East rival West Virginia on the road. The Hoyas also played former Big East member Syracuse on the road in the annual renewal of their rivalry. All other non-conference games were at home, two of them on campus at McDonough Arena and the rest at Capital One Arena. Georgetown met former Big East opponent Notre Dame at Capital One Arena in the second season of a two-year home-and-home series.

For the second season in a row Georgetown hosted an unnamed and unsponsored multi-team event, again referred to as the "Georgetown MTE." In the 2024 Georgetown MTE, each of three participating teams played each other once, with the Hoyas hosting both Mount St. Mary's and Saint Francis and Mount St. Mary's hosting Saint Francis.

Plans for Georgetown and Maryland to begin a four-year home-and-home series in the 2024–25 season changed in mid-May 2024, with the beginning of the series reportedly pushed back until the 2025–26 season and Maryland hosting the first meeting, the change blamed on scheduling difficulties in 2024–25. In late June, the schools confirmed these plans for the series.

Georgetown finished with a record of 9–2 in non-conference play.

=== Conference season ===
Georgetown played a 20-game conference season from December 18 through March 8, meeting each Big East opponent in a home-and-home series. The Hoyas finished with a conference record of 8–12.

=== Big East tournament ===
Georgetown lost to DePaul in the first round of the 2025 Big East tournament at Madison Square Garden in New York City on March 12.

=== National Invitation Tournament ===
Georgetown received an invitation to the 2025 National Invitation Tournament, but was contractually obliged to decline it because of a Big East Conference commitment to participate in the inaugural College Basketball Crown tournament.

=== College Basketball Crown ===
Georgetown accepted a bid to the 2025 College Basketball Crown tournament. The Hoyas lost to Nebraska in the quarterfinal round.

== Schedule and results ==
Date time, TV	Rank^{#}	Opponent^{#}	Result	Record	High points	High rebounds	High assists	Site (attendance) city, state
Preseason
October 10, 2024*		Blue vs. Gray; Intrasquad						Washington, DC
October 12, 2024*; 12:00 p.m.		Maryland; Closed scrimmage	W 68–64	—	19 – Mack	? – Burks/Sorber	5 – Mack	Thompson Athletic Center (0); Washington, DC
Regular season
November 6, 2024*; 7:00 p.m., FS2		Lehigh	W 85–77	1–0	20 – Tied	13 – Sorber	5 – Mack	McDonough Gymnasium (2,008); Washington, DC
November 9, 2024*; 4:00 p.m., FS2		Fairfield	W 69–57	2–0	25 – Sorber	9 – Sorber	5 – Peavy	Capital One Arena (5,208); Washington, DC
November 16, 2024*; 1:00 p.m., NBC		Notre Dame	L 63–84	2–1	16 – Mack	6 – Mack	5 – Mack	Capital One Arena (8,819); Washington, DC
November 20, 2024*; 8:30 p.m., FS1		Mount St. Mary's; Georgetown MTE	W 79–51	3–1	19 – Epps	12 – Sorber	5 – Tied	Capital One Arena (2,756); Washington, DC
November 23, 2024*; 12:00 p.m., FS2		Saint Francis; Georgetown MTE	W 82–65	4–1	24 – Peavy	7 – Mack	6 – Peavy	Capital One Arena (3,192); Washington, DC
November 26, 2024*; 7:00 p.m., FS1		Wagner	W 66–41	5–1	16 – Mack	7 – Sorber	6 – Sorber	McDonough Gymnasium (1,477); Washington, DC
November 30, 2024*; 4:00 p.m., FS2		Albany	W 100–68	6–1	24 – Peavy	13 – Sorber	8 – Peavy	Capital One Arena (4,227); Washington, DC
December 2, 2024*; 6:30 p.m., FS1		UMBC	W 86–62	7–1	23 – Sorber	9 – Fielder	5 – Tied	Capital One Arena (2,788); Washington, DC
December 6, 2024*; 7:00 p.m., ESPN2		at West Virginia; Big East–Big 12 Battle	L 60–73	7–2	17 – Epps	8 – Fielder	3 – Sorber	WVU Coliseum (11,522); Morgantown, WV
December 14, 2024*; 2:30 p.m., ACCN		at Syracuse; Rivalry	W 75–71	8–2	27 – Epps	9 – Peavy	8 – Mack	JMA Wireless Dome (17,187); Syracuse, NY
December 18, 2024; 6:30 p.m., CBSSN		Creighton	W 81–57	9–2 (1–0)	21 – Epps	8 – Tied	8 – Peavy	Capital One Arena (4,062); Washington, DC
December 22, 2024; 7:00 p.m., FS1		at Seton Hall	W 61–60	10–2 (2–0)	19 – Sorber	8 – Sorber	5 – Peavy	Prudential Center (8,879); Newark, NJ
December 28, 2024*; 12:00 p.m., FS1		Coppin State	W 83–53	11–2	22 – Sorber	13 – Fielder	11 – Mack	Capital One Arena (5,298); Washington, DC
January 3, 2025; 8:10 p.m., CBSSN		Xavier	W 69–63	12–2 (3–0)	26 – Mack	10 – Peavy	3 – Mack	Capital One Arena (6,640); Washington, DC
January 7, 2025; 8:05 p.m., CBSSN		at No. 7 Marquette	L 66–74	12–3 (3–1)	18 – Mack	13 – Sorber	5 – Mack	Fiserv Forum (15,756); Milwaukee, WI
January 11, 2025; 2:15 p.m., FOX		No. 9 UConn; Rivalry	L 60–68	12–4 (3–2)	15 – Cu. Williams	10 – Sorber	4 – Sorber	Capital One Arena (17,168); Washington, DC
January 14, 2025; 7:30 p.m., Peacock		at St. John's; Rivalry	L 58–63	12–5 (3–3)	21 – Peavy	12 – Fielder	6 – Mack	Madison Square Garden (12,757); New York, NY
January 17, 2025; 8:10 p.m., CBSSN		DePaul	L 68–73	12–6 (3–4)	19 – Fielder/Mack	10 – Peavy	6 – Mack	Capital One Arena (5,311); Washington, DC
January 20, 2025; 6:00 p.m., FS1		at Villanova	W 64–63	13–6 (4–4)	24 – Peavy	11 – Sorber	4 – Epps/Sorber	Finneran Pavilion (6,501); Villanova, PA
January 25, 2025; 12:35 p.m., FOX		at Providence	L 68–78	13–7 (4–5)	27 – Peavy	15 – Sorber	3 – Mack	Amica Mutual Pavilion (12,400); Providence, RI
January 28, 2025; 6:30 p.m., FS1		No. 15 St. John's; Rivalry	L 41–66	13–8 (4–6)	13 – Mack	9 – Sorber	3 – Mack	Capital One Arena (4,386); Washington, DC
January 31, 2025; 6:30 p.m., FS1		Butler	W 73–70	14–8 (5–6)	19 – Peavy/Sorber	Peavy – 9	6 – Mack	Capital One Arena (6,729); Washington, DC
February 4, 2025; 8:42 p.m., FS1		at Xavier	L 69–74	14–9 (5–7)	27 – Peavy	6 – Fielder	8 – Mack	Cintas Center (10,212); Cincinnati, OH
February 8, 2025; 12:00 p.m., FS1		Seton Hall	W 60–46	15–9 (6–7)	22 – Peavy	11 – Sorber	4 – Mack/Peavy	Capital One Arena (9,261); Washington, DC
February 15, 2025; 2:05 p.m., FS1		at Butler	L 86–97	15–10 (6–8)	21 – Peavy	7 – Peavy	10 – Peavy	Hinkle Fieldhouse (8,844); Indianapolis, IN
February 19, 2025; 7:00 p.m., FS1		Providence	W 93–72	16–10 (7–8)	30 – Peavy	9 – Fielder	7 – Peavy	Capital One Arena (5,326); Washington, DC
February 23, 2025; 4:00 p.m., Peacock		at Creighton	L 69–80	16–11 (7–9)	22 – Epps	12 – Peavy	4 – Peavy	CHI Health Center Omaha (17,545); Omaha, NE
February 26, 2025; 6:30 p.m., FS1		at UConn; Rivalry	L 79–93	16–12 (7–10)	25 – Peavy	4 – Mack	6 – Mack	XL Center (15,684); Hartford, CT
March 1, 2025; 8:00 p.m., Peacock		No. 21 Marquette	L 61–76	16–13 (7–11)	15 – Peavy	10 – Burks	7 – Epps	Capital One Arena (7,729); Washington, DC
March 4, 2025; 8:00 p.m., Peacock		Villanova	W 75–73	17–13 (8–11)	20 – Epps	7 – Fielder	4 – Fielder/Mack	Capital One Arena (5,144); Washington, DC
March 8, 2025; 2:00 p.m., FS1		at DePaul	L 77–83	17–14 (8–12)	29 – Peavy	10 – Peavy	3 – Tied	Wintrust Arena (5,453); Chicago, IL
Big East tournament
March 12, 2025*; 6:35 p.m., Peacock	(7)	vs. (10) DePaul; First round	L 67–71	17–15	26 – Peavy	11 – Fielder	4 – Fielder	Madison Square Garden (N/A); New York, NY
College Basketball Crown
March 31, 2025; 11:10 p.m., FS1		vs. Washington State; First round	W 85–82	18–15	37 – Mack	13 – Burks	4 – Mack/Williams	MGM Grand Garden Arena (2,947); Paradise, NV
April 2, 2025; 9:30 p.m., FS1		vs. Nebraska; Quarterfinals	L 69–81	18–16	25 – Mack	6 – Burks	3 – Mack	MGM Grand Garden Arena (2,512); Paradise, NV
*Non-conference game. ^{#}Rankings from AP Poll. (#) Tournament seedings in parentheses. All times are in Eastern Time.

== Rankings ==
Ranking movements Legend: ██ Increase in ranking ██ Decrease in ranking — = Not ranked RV = Received votes
	Week																				
Poll	Pre	1	2	3	4	5	6	7	8	9	10	11	12	13	14	15	16	17	18	19	Final
AP	—	—	—	—	—	—	—	—	—	—	RV	—	—	—	—	—	—	—	—	—	—
Coaches	—	—	—	—	—	—	—	—	—	—	—	—	—	—	—	—	—	—	—	—	—

== Awards and honors ==
=== Preseason honors ===
Preseason All-Big East Third Team
Player	Position	Award Date
Jayden Epps	G	October 23, 2024

=== Weekly honors ===
Big East Player of the Week
Player	Position	Award Date
Jayden Epps	G	December 16, 2024

Big East Freshman of the Week
Player	Position	Award Date
Thomas Sorber	C	November 11, 2024
Thomas Sorber	C	November 25, 2024
Thomas Sorber	C	December 2, 2024
Thomas Sorber	C	January 6, 2025
Thomas Sorber	C	January 27, 2025
Thomas Sorber	C	February 3, 2025
Thomas Sorber	C	February 10, 2025

Big East Weekly Honor Roll
Player	Position	Award Date
Jayden Epps	G	November 25, 2024
Jayden Epps	G	December 23, 2024
Malik Mack	G	January 6, 2025
Micah Peavy	G	December 2, 2024
Micah Peavy	G	January 27, 2025
Micah Peavy	G	February 10, 2025
Micah Peavy	G	February 24, 2025
Micah Peavy	G	March 9, 2025

=== Postseason honors ===
All-Big East First Team
Player	Position	Award Date
Micah Peavy	G	March 9, 2025

All-Big East Third Team
Player	Position	Award Date
Thomas Sorber	C	March 9, 2025

Big East All-Freshman Team
Player	Position	Award Date
Thomas Sorber	C	March 9, 2025
