= 2025–26 Georgetown Hoyas men's basketball team =

American college basketball season

2025–26 Georgetown Hoyas men's basketball
- Conference: Big East
- Record: 16–18 (6–14 Big East)
- Head coach: Ed Cooley (3rd season)
- Associate head coach: Jeff Battle (3rd season)
- Assistant coaches: Brian Blaney (3rd season); Walt Corbean (3rd season); LaDontae Henton (3rd season); Jason Williford (1st season)
- Home arena: Capital One Arena; McDonough Gymnasium

2025–26 Big East men's basketball standings
	Conf.				Overall
Team	W		L	PCT	W		L	PCT
No. 10 St. John's †	18	–	2	.900	30	–	7	.811
No. 2 UConn	17	–	3	.850	34	–	6	.850
Villanova	15	–	5	.750	24	–	9	.727
Seton Hall	10	–	10	.500	21	–	12	.636
Creighton	9	–	11	.450	16	–	18	.471
DePaul	8	–	12	.400	16	–	16	.500
Marquette	7	–	13	.350	12	–	20	.375
Butler	7	–	13	.350	16	–	16	.500
Providence	7	–	13	.350	15	–	18	.455
Xavier	6	–	14	.300	15	–	18	.455
Georgetown	6	–	14	.300	16	–	18	.471
† 2026 Big East tournament winner Rankings from AP poll

The 2025–26 Georgetown Hoyas men's basketball team represented Georgetown University in the 2025–26 NCAA Division I men's basketball season. The Hoyas, led by third-year head coach Ed Cooley, were members of the Big East Conference. The Hoyas played their home games in Washington, D.C., at Capital One Arena and McDonough Gymnasium.

Despite a strong 5–0 start, the team's best since the 2017-18 season, the Hoyas struggled for the remainder of the year. They ultimately finished in last place in the Big East for the third time in the previous six seasons. Playing as the 11th seed in the Big East tournament, Georgetown concluded its season with upset victories over DePaul and Villanova before being defeated in the semifinals by UConn.

== Previous season ==
The 2024–25 season was Ed Cooley's second as the head coach of the Hoyas. The team's performance was markedly better than in the previous several seasons. Georgetown finished the season with a record of 18–16 while going 8–12 in Big East play to finish the year in seventh place in conference play. This marked the Hoyas' first year with a winning record and highest finish in Big East play since the 2018–19 season. In the Big East Tournament, they lost to DePaul in the first round. At the conclusion of the season, Georgetown was selected to play in the inaugural College Basketball Crown tournament. The Hoyas defeated Washington State for their first postseason victory since 2015 before ending their season with a loss to Nebraska in the second round. Following the season Thomas Sorber and Micah Peavy were selected in the NBA Draft, marking the first time that two Hoyas players were selected in the same draft since 2008.

== Offseason ==
=== Departures ===
Departures
Name	No.	Pos.	Height	Weight	Year	Hometown	Reason for departure
Micah Peavy	5	G/F	6'8"	220	Graduate Student	Cibolo, TX	Completed eligibility; Drafted 40th overall in the 2025 NBA Draft
Drew McKenna	7	F	6'8"	220	RS Freshman	Laurel, MD	Transferred to Old Dominion
Jayden Epps	10	G	6'2"	190	Junior	Norfolk, VA	Transferred to Mississippi State
Curtis Williams Jr.	11	G	6'6"	205	Sophomore	Detroit, MI	Transferred to Tulane
Drew Fielder	20	C	6'11"	235	Sophomore	Boise, ID	Transferred to Boise State
Jordan Burks	23	F	6'9"	205	Sophomore	Decatur, AL	Transferred to UCF
Thomas Sorber	35	F/C	6'10"	255	Freshman	Trenton, NJ	Drafted 15th overall in the 2025 NBA Draft

=== Incoming transfers ===
Incoming transfers
Name	No.	Pos.	Height	Weight	Year	Hometown	Previous School
DeShawn Harris-Smith	1	G	6'5"	224	Junior	Woodbridge, VA	Maryland
Vince Iwuchukwu	3	C	7'1"	257	Senior	Imo State, Nigeria	St. John's
KJ Lewis	5	G	6'4"	210	Junior	El Paso, TX	Arizona
Isaiah Abraham	7	F	6'7"	205	Sophomore	Gainesville, VA	UConn
Langston Love	13	G	6'5"	210	Graduate Student	Universal City, TX	Baylor
Jeremiah Williams	25	G	6'4"	200	Graduate Student	Chicago, IL	Rutgers

=== Recruiting class ===
Georgetown did not initially sign any high school recruits from the class of 2025, opting instead to fill out the roster with players from the transfer portal. Two players from the 2024 class (Seal Diouf and Jayden Fort) redshirted during the previous season and saw their first collegiate playing time as part of the 2025–26 team.

On November 6, 2025, Georgetown announced the signing of Brazilian point guard Gabriel Landeira, who joined the team in January 2026.

College recruiting
Name	Hometown	School	Height	Weight	Commit date
Gabriel Landeira; PG	Rio de Janeiro, Brazil	Instituto de Formacao Profissional e Emprego	6 ft 6 in (1.98 m)	220 lb (100 kg)	Nov 6, 2025
Gabriel Landeira; PG	Recruit ratings: No ratings found				
Overall recruit ranking:
Note: In many cases, Scout, Rivals, 247Sports, On3, and ESPN may conflict in their listings of height and weight.; In these cases, the average was taken. ESPN grades are on a 100-point scale.; Sources: "2025 Georgetown Signees". ESPN.; "2025 Team Ranking". Rivals.

== Roster ==
Georgetown initially announced its 2025–26 roster on July 29, 2025. The published roster was later updated on December 29, 2025, to reflect the addition of Landeira.

2025–26 Georgetown Hoyas men's basketball team
Players
Coaches

Pos.	#	Name	Height	Weight	Year	Previous school	Hometown
F	0	Jayden Fort	6 ft 9 in (2.06 m)	216 lb (98 kg)	So	Jackson-Reed HS (DC)	Washington, DC
G	1	DeShawn Harris-Smith	6 ft 5 in (1.96 m)	224 lb (102 kg)	Jr	Maryland	Woodbridge, VA
G	2	Malik Mack	6 ft 2 in (1.88 m)	175 lb (79 kg)	Jr	Harvard	Oxon Hill, MD
C	3	Vince Iwuchukwu	7 ft 1 in (2.16 m)	257 lb (117 kg)	Sr	St. John's	Imo State, Nigeria
F	4	Caleb Williams	6 ft 7 in (2.01 m)	227 lb (103 kg)	So	Sidwell Friends School (DC)	Washington, DC
G	5	KJ Lewis	6 ft 4 in (1.93 m)	210 lb (95 kg)	Jr	Arizona	El Paso, TX
F	7	Isaiah Abraham	6 ft 7 in (2.01 m)	205 lb (93 kg)	So	UConn	Gainesville, VA
G	8	Gabriel Landeira (redshirt)	6 ft 6 in (1.98 m)	220 lb (100 kg)	Fr	Instituto de Formacao Profissional e Emprego	Rio de Janeiro, Brazil
C	11	Julius Halaifonua	7 ft 0 in (2.13 m)	259 lb (117 kg)	So	NBA Global Academy (Australia)	Auckland, New Zealand
F	12	Austin Montgomery (W)	6 ft 6 in (1.98 m)	205 lb (93 kg)	Jr	LSU	New Orleans, LA
G	13	Langston Love	6 ft 5 in (1.96 m)	210 lb (95 kg)	GS	Baylor	Universal City, TX
C	14	Seal Diouf	6 ft 9 in (2.06 m)	255 lb (116 kg)	So	The Dunn School (CA)	Gouda, Netherlands
G	15	Hashem Asadallah (W)	6 ft 2 in (1.88 m)	189 lb (86 kg)	Jr	American School of Kuwait	Jabriya, Kuwait
G	22	Mason Moses (W)	6 ft 6 in (1.98 m)	209 lb (95 kg)	So	Brewster Academy (NH)	New York, NY
G	25	Jeremiah Williams	6 ft 4 in (1.93 m)	200 lb (91 kg)	GS	Rutgers	Chicago, IL
G	30	Michael Van Raaphorst (W)	6 ft 2 in (1.88 m)	218 lb (99 kg)	So	Delbarton School (NJ)	Chatham, NJ
G	45	Kayvaun Mulready	6 ft 4 in (1.93 m)	219 lb (99 kg)	So	Worcester Academy (MA)	Worcester, MA

Head coach

- Ed Cooley (Stonehill)

Assistant coach(es)

- Jeff Battle (Marshall)
- Brian Blaney (Roanoke)
- Walt Corbean (Xavier)
- LaDontae Henton (Providence)
- Jason Williford (Virginia)

Legend

- (C) Team captain
- (S) Suspended
- (I) Ineligible
- (W) Walk-on
- Injured
- Current redshirt

Roster

NOTES: After playing in six games for Georgetown, last appearing in a game on November 28, DeShawn Harris-Smith left the team for "personal reasons" in mid-December. Georgetown announced Gabriel Landeira's addition to the roster on November 6, with eligibility to play beginning in January 2026, but he redshirted during the 2025–26 season.

== Season recap ==
=== GLOBL JAM ===
Georgetown announced on July 17, 2025, that the Hoyas would represent the United States in the 2025 GLOBL JAM, an under-23 tournament in Toronto, Ontario, Canada, in August 2025. Georgetown played games against the national teams of Brazil, Canada, and Japan between August 13 and 16, followed by the gold medal game on August 17. Georgetown finished the tournament as the runner-up with a record of 2–2, following a defeat by Brazil in the gold medal game.

After competing against Georgetown as Brazil's point guard in the 2025 GLOBL JAM and being named the tournament's most valuable player, Gabriel Landeira announced his commitment to Georgetown on November 6, 2025, with eligibility to play in January 2026. On November 6, Landeira told the press "I chose Georgetown because from the first time we played against them, I liked their style and how they competed" and so that he could "be a part of a program that is growing and study at one of the best universities in the United States."

=== Exhibitions ===
Georgetown scheduled two exhibition games in October, visiting George Washington and Kentucky. Georgetown won both games, defeating George Washington in the first meeting of the schools since 1981, and defeating No. 9 Kentucky in the schools' first meeting since the Hoyas' victory in the 1984 Final Four.

=== Non-conference season ===
The Hoyas played an 11-game non-conference schedule between November 3 and December 22, 2025. They played at Maryland and defeated the Terrapins in the first game of a four-year home-and-home series against them. They hosted Clemson for the first time in school history, defeating the Tigers in the first year of a two-year home-and-home series with them. In late November, they participated along with BYU, Dayton, and Miami in the Magic Bracket of the ESPN Events Invitational; they lost both games, first to Dayton in the semifinal in overtime on Thanksgiving Day and then to Miami in the third-place game the next day. They also lost to No. 16 North Carolina in the first game of a two-year home-and-home series against the Tar Heels. They did not play their former Big East rival Syracuse, the first season that the two teams did not meet since 2014–2015. The Hoyas went 8–3 in non-conference play.

=== Conference season ===
The Big East Conference released its 2025–26 schedule on September 11, 2025. The Hoyas played a 20-game conference schedule between December 17, 2025, and March 7, 2026, meeting each other Big East team twice in a home-and-home series.

Following the team's second game of Big East play, a home loss against Xavier on December 20, head coach Ed Cooley threw a water bottle into the stands. The bottle struck a child. Cooley received a one-game suspension for the incident, which he served in the subsequent game, a victory over Coppin State on December 22.

Two long losing streaks during Big East play left the Hoyas with a final conference record of 6–14, tied for 10th place and seeded 11th and last in the 2026 Big East Tournament. Although the team's final record of 16–18 was a disappointment, the season ended on a positive note, with Georgetown scoring two upset wins in the tournament and advancing beyond the first round for the first time since 2021 before losing to the second seed, No. 6 UConn, in the Hoyas' first semifinal appearance since 2021.

== Schedule and results ==
Date time, TV	Rank^{#}	Opponent^{#}	Result	Record	High points	High rebounds	High assists	Site (attendance) city, state
GLOBL JAM
August 13, 2025*; 11:00 a.m., ESPN+		vs. Japan; GLOBL JAM	W 88–53	—	19 – Harris-Smith	11 – Harris-Smith	8 – Harris-Smith	Mattamy Athletic Centre at the Gardens, Toronto, Canada
August 14, 2025*; 6:00 p.m., ESPN+		vs. Canada; GLOBL JAM	L 62–65	—	14 – Mack	8 – Harris-Smith	11 – Mack	Mattamy Athletic Centre at the Gardens, Toronto, Canada
August 16, 2025*; 2:00 p.m., ESPN+		vs. Brazil; GLOBL JAM	W 76–74	—	16 – Iwuchukwu	8 – C. Williams	7 – Mack	Mattamy Athletic Centre at the Gardens, Toronto, Canada
August 17, 2025*; 8:00 p.m., ESPN+		vs. Brazil; GLOBL JAM Gold Medal Game	L 73–77	—	19 – Mack	9 – Iwuchukwu	7 – Mack	Mattamy Athletic Centre at the Gardens, Toronto, Canada
Exhibition
October 18, 2025*; 6:00 p.m., MSN		at George Washington	W 73–64	—	20 – C. Williams	6 – Tied	4 – Tied	Charles E. Smith Center (4,287); Washington, DC
October 30, 2025*; 7:00 p.m., SEC Network+		at No. 9 Kentucky	W 84–70	—	22 – Mack	5 – Tied	3 – Tied	Rupp Arena (19,251); Lexington, KY
Regular Season
November 3, 2025*; 6:35 p.m., ESPN+		Morgan State	W 87–70	1–0	14 – Lewis	8 – Halaifonua	4 – Mack	Capital One Arena (4,208); Washington, DC
November 7, 2025*; 6:00 p.m., FS1		at Maryland	W 70–60	2–0	19 – Mack	10 – C. Williams	4 – Halaifonua	Xfinity Center (16,594); College Park, MD
November 12, 2025*; 6:35 p.m., ESPN+		Binghamton	W 83–70	3–0	20 – Lewis	10 – Lewis	5 – J. Williams	Capital One Arena (3,391); Washington, DC
November 15, 2025*; 12:00 p.m., Peacock		Clemson	W 79–74	4–0	26 – Lewis	6 – Tied	7 – Mack	Capital One Arena (8,562); Washington, DC
November 22, 2025*; 12:05 p.m., ESPN+		Wagner	W 92–75	5–0	18 – Mack	9 – Halaifonua	5 – Tied	Capital One Arena (4,184); Washington, DC
November 27, 2025*; 7:30 p.m., ESPN2		vs. Dayton; ESPN Events Invitational Magic Bracket Semifinal	L 79–84 ^{OT}	5–1	24 – Mack	9 – C. Williams	7 – Lewis	State Farm Field House (4,276); Kissimmee, FL
November 28, 2025*; 7:00 p.m., ESPN2		vs. Miami (FL); ESPN Events Invitational Magic Bracket Third Place	L 65–78	5–2	23 – C. Williams	6 – C. Williams	7 – Mack	State Farm Field House; Kissimmee, FL
December 3, 2025*; 8:00 p.m., TruTV		UMBC	W 90–81	6–2	18 – C. Williams	9 – Halaifonua	7 – Mack	Capital One Arena (3,436); Washington, DC
December 7, 2025*; 5:00 p.m., ESPN		at No. 16 North Carolina	L 61–81	6–3	17 – Lewis	7 – Lewis	4 – Mack	Dean Smith Center (18,583); Chapel Hill, NC
December 13, 2025*; 2:30 p.m., ESPN+		Saint Peter's	W 76–68 ^{OT}	7–3	22 – Halaifonua	9 – Halaifonua	5 – Lewis	McDonough Gymnasium (1,622); Washington, DC
December 17, 2025; 8:40 p.m., FS1		at Marquette	W 78–69	8–3 (1–0)	21 – Halaifonua	6 – Tied	5 – Tied	Fiserv Forum (14,038); Milwaukee, WI
December 20, 2025; 8:00 p.m., FS1		Xavier	L 77–80	8–4 (1–1)	21 – Mack	7 – J. Williams	4 – J. Williams	Capital One Arena (5,077); Washington, DC
December 22, 2025*; 6:30 p.m., ESPN+		Coppin State	W 97–67	9–4	20 – Halaifonua	8 – Halaifonua	8 – Lewis	McDonough Gymnasium (1,463); Washington, DC
December 31, 2025; 8:12 p.m., FS1		St. John's; Rivalry	L 83–95	9–5 (1–2)	27 – Lewis	8 – Fort	8 – Mack	Capital One Arena (4,493); Washington, DC
January 6, 2026; 8:05 p.m., TruTV		at DePaul	L 50–56	9–6 (1–3)	18 – Lewis	7 – Lewis	1 – Tied	Wintrust Arena (3,708); Chicago, IL
January 10, 2026; 6:15 p.m., FS1		Seton Hall	L 67–76	9–7 (1–4)	14 – Mack	7 – Iwuchukwu	3 – Lewis	Capital One Arena (8,230); Washington, DC
January 13, 2026; 9:00 p.m., Peacock		at Creighton	L 83–86 ^{OT}	9–8 (1–5)	17 – Mack	6 – Tied	4 – Tied	CHI Health Center Omaha (16,554); Omaha, NE
January 17, 2026; 12:00 p.m., FOX		No. 3 UConn; Rivalry	L 62–64	9–9 (1–6)	12 – Tied	14 – Iwuchukwu	5 – J. Williams	Capital One Arena (17,861); Washington, DC
January 21, 2026; 7:00 p.m., Peacock		at Villanova	L 51–66	9–10 (1–7)	12 – Tied	8 – Tied	5 – Mack	Finneran Pavilion (6,501); Villanova, PA
January 24, 2026; 12:30 p.m., TNT		at Providence	W 81–78	10–10 (2–7)	26 – Lewis	7 – C. Williams	3 – Mack	Amica Mutual Pavilion (12,304); Providence, RI
January 28, 2026; 8:42 p.m., FS1		DePaul	W 70–61	11–10 (3–7)	16 – Mack	6 – Tied	7 – Mack	Capital One Arena (3,422); Washington, DC
January 31, 2026; 12:00 p.m., TNT/TruTV		at Butler	W 77–64	12–10 (4–7)	17 – Tied	6 – Tied	6 – Tied	Hinkle Fieldhouse (7,755); Indianapolis, IN
February 4, 2026; 7:30 p.m., Peacock		Creighton	W 76–68	13–10 (5–7)	22 – Lewis	10 – Tied	3 – Tied	Capital One Arena (4,380); Washington, DC
February 7, 2026; 12:00 p.m., TNT/TruTV		Villanova	L 73–80	13–11 (5–8)	21 – Mack	12 – Iwuchukwu	3 – Mack	Capital One Arena (14,042); Washington, DC
February 14, 2026; 8:00 p.m., Peacock		at No. 6 UConn; Rivalry	L 75–79	13–12 (5–9)	24 – Lewis	9 – Lewis	5 – J. Williams	Gampel Pavilion (10,244); Storrs, CT
February 18, 2026; 6:30 p.m., FS1		Butler	L 89–93	13–13 (5–10)	16 – C. Williams	4 – Mulready	7 – Mack	Capital One Arena (4,456); Washington, DC
February 21, 2026; 6:15 p.m., FS1		at Seton Hall	L 47–51	13–14 (5–11)	10 – Lewis	8 – Iwuchukwu	4 – C. Williams	Prudential Center (9,055); Newark, NJ
February 24, 2026; 7:00 p.m., Peacock		Marquette	L 60–76	13–15 (5–12)	19 – Iwuchukwu	7 – Iwuchukwu	5 – Mack	Capital One Arena (4,519); Washington, DC
February 28, 2026; 1:30 p.m., TNT		at Xavier	L 84–91	13–16 (5–13)	19 – Mulready	6 – Iwuchukwu	10 – J. Williams	Cintas Center (9,785); Cincinnati, OH
March 3, 2026; 7:00 p.m., Peacock		at No. 18 St. John's; Rivalry	L 69–72	13–17 (5–14)	20 – Mulready	7 – Mulready	5 – Mack	Madison Square Garden (14,319); New York, NY
March 7, 2026; 8:00 p.m., TruTV		Providence	W 80–79	14–17 (6–14)	25 – Iwuchukwu	10 – Iwuchukwu	7 – Mulready	Capital One Arena (6,308); Washington, DC
Big East Tournament
March 11, 2026; 9:00 p.m., Peacock/NBCSN	(11)	vs. (6) DePaul; First round	W 63–56	15–17	17 – Tied	14 – Iwuchukwu	4 – Mack	Madison Square Garden (19,812); New York, NY
March 12, 2026; 9:42 p.m., FS1	(11)	vs. (3) Villanova; Quarterfinal	W 78–64	16–17	21 – Halaifonua	10 – Halaifonua	6 – Tied	Madison Square Garden (19,812); New York, NY
March 13, 2026; 8:30 p.m., FS1	(11)	vs. (2) No. 6 UConn; Semifinal/Rivalry	L 51–67	16–18	11 – Iwuchukwu	5 – Mack	5 – Mulready	Madison Square Garden (19,812); New York, NY
*Non-conference game. ^{#}Rankings from AP Poll. (#) Tournament seedings in parentheses. All times are in Eastern Time.

== Awards and honors ==
=== Preseason honors ===
Preseason All-Big East Second Team
Player	Position	Award Date
KJ Lewis	G	October 21, 2025

Preseason All-Big East Third Team
Player	Position	Award Date
Malik Mack	G	October 21, 2025

=== Weekly honors ===
Big East Weekly Honor Roll
Player	Position	Award Date
Julius Halaifonua	C	December 29, 2025
KJ Lewis	G	November 10, 2025
KJ Lewis	G	November 17, 2025
KJ Lewis	G	December 29, 2025
KJ Lewis	G	January 5, 2026
KJ Lewis	G	January 26, 2026
Malik Mack	G	February 2, 2026
Malik Mack	G	February 9, 2026
Kayvaun Mulready	G	March 8, 2026

=== Postseason honors ===
All-Big East Third Team
Player	Position	Award Date
KJ Lewis	G	March 8, 2026
