= Langston Love =

American basketball player (born 2002)

Sokoli 1933 Štip
- Position: Shooting guard
- League: Prva A Liga

Personal information
- Born: April 21, 2002 (age 24) Universal City, Texas, U.S.
- Listed height: 6 ft 5 in (1.96 m)
- Listed weight: 210 lb (95 kg)

Career information
- High school: Byron P. Steele II (Cibolo, Texas); Montverde Academy (Montverde, Florida)
- College: Baylor (2022–2025); Georgetown (2025–2026)
- NBA draft: 2026: undrafted
- Playing career: 2026–present

Career history
- 2026–present: Sokoli 1933 Štip

Langston Hasan Love (born April 21, 2002) is an American basketball player for Sokoli 1933 Štip of the Macedonian Prva A Liga. He played college basketball for the Baylor Bears and the Georgetown Hoyas.

== High school career ==
Love began his high school career at Steele High School in Cibolo, Texas. He averaged 23.1 points, 7.8 rebounds and 1.5 steals per game as a sophomore. Following his sophomore season, Love transferred to Montverde Academy and played alongside Cade Cunningham, Scottie Barnes, Moses Moody, Day'Ron Sharpe, Dariq Whitehead, and Caleb Houstan. As a junior, he scored 18 points against McEachern High School during the Hoophall Classic. Love helped Montverde to a GEICO National title as a senior, contributing 13 points, seven rebounds and five assists in a 62–52 win against Sunrise Christian Academy. Love was named to the roster of the Jordan Brand Classic.

=== Recruiting ===
Love was a consensus four-star recruit and one of the top shooting guards in the 2021 class. On July 15, 2020, he committed to playing college basketball for Baylor, the first school to offer him a scholarship. He chose the Bears over offers from Stanford, Texas, UCLA, Kansas, Arkansas, Villanova, Illinois, Texas Tech, Texas A&M and Oklahoma State. Love became the highest-rated Baylor signee since Isaiah Austin committed in 2012, and the fourth-highest ranked prospect in program history.

College recruiting
Name	Hometown	School	Height	Weight	Commit date
Langston Love; SG	Universal City, TX	Montverde Academy (FL)	6 ft 4 in (1.93 m)	190 lb (86 kg)	Jul 15, 2020
Langston Love; SG	Recruit ratings: Rivals: 247Sports: ESPN: (89)				
Overall recruit ranking: Rivals: 56 247Sports: 37 ESPN: 28
Note: In many cases, Scout, Rivals, 247Sports, On3, and ESPN may conflict in their listings of height and weight.; In these cases, the average was taken. ESPN grades are on a 100-point scale.; Sources: "Baylor 2021 Basketball Commitments". Rivals.; "2021 Baylor Bears Recruiting Class". ESPN.; "2021 Team Ranking". Rivals.

== College career ==
=== Baylor ===
On October 5, 2021, Love tore his ACL in a scrimmage and missed the season. As a redshirt freshman, he averaged 6.3 points and 2.2 rebounds per game. Love averaged 11 points and 2.9 rebounds per game as a sophomore. He was hampered by ankle injuries during his junior season, forcing him to miss eight games. As a junior, he averaged 8.9 points, 2.8 rebounds, and 1.2 assists per game.

=== Georgetown ===
Following his junior season Love transferred to Georgetown. He followed in the footsteps of fellow Cibolo native Micah Peavy, who had transferred to Georgetown the previous season before being drafted into the NBA.

== Professional career ==
On November 5, 2026, Love signed with Sokoli 1933 Štip of the Macedonian Prva A Liga.

== Personal life ==
Love's father Kevin Love was a standout football player at Judson High School. His mother is Ondrea Love. He has 3 sisters, Endaisia, Camille and Sidney who all played collegiate sports. He also has an older brother Kijana, who played collegiately at New Hampshire.

== Career statistics ==
Legend
GP	Games played	GS	Games started	MPG	Minutes per game
FG%	Field goal percentage	3P%	3-point field goal percentage	FT%	Free throw percentage
RPG	Rebounds per game	APG	Assists per game	SPG	Steals per game
BPG	Blocks per game	PPG	Points per game	**Bold**	Career high

=== College ===
Year	Team	GP	GS	MPG	FG%	3P%	FT%	RPG	APG	SPG	BPG	PPG
2021–22	Baylor	Redshirt (redshirt)										
2022–23	Baylor	**30**	2	16.6	.432	.364	.691	2.2	.8	.4	.1	6.3
2023–24	Baylor	24	0	24.8	**.465**	**.480**	.783	**2.9**	**1.2**	.4	**.2**	**11.0**
2024–25	Baylor	20	**12**	**26.4**	.389	.326	**.892**	2.8	**1.2**	**.7**	**.2**	8.9
2025–26	Georgetown	22	1	12.3	.386	.250	.800	1.6	.5	.1	0	3.1
Career		96	15	19.7	.427	.371	.779	2.4	.9	.4	.1	7.3
