= KJ Lewis =

American basketball player (born 2004)

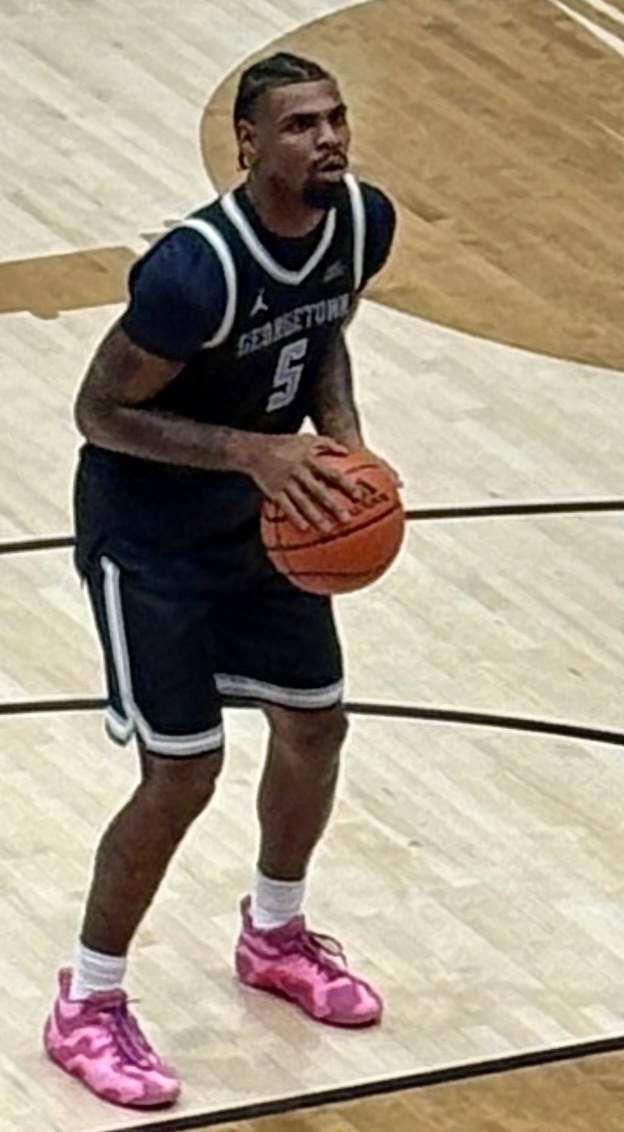
- Lewis at Georgetown in 2025

No. 2 – USC Trojans
- Position: Shooting guard
- Conference: Big Ten Conference

Personal information
- Born: August 3, 2004 (age 22)
- Listed height: 6 ft 4 in (1.93 m)
- Listed weight: 210 lb (95 kg)

Career information
- High school: Chapin (El Paso, Texas); Duncanville (Duncanville, Texas)
- College: Arizona (2023–2025); Georgetown (2025–2026); USC (2026–present)

Career highlights
- Third-team All-Big East (2026)

Kenyon Lewis Jr. (born August 3, 2004) is an American college basketball player for the USC Trojans of the Big Ten Conference. He previously played for the Arizona Wildcats and Georgetown Hoyas.

== Early life and high school ==
Lewis grew up in Tucson, Arizona, and attended Mesquite Elementary School in Vail, Arizona prior to fifth grade. He originally attended Chapin High School in El Paso. His sophomore and junior seasons he led Chapin to the Region I-5A semifinals where they lost both times. He averaged 20 points, 5 rebounds, 3 assists, and 3 steals per game and was a finalist for Mr. Texas Basketball Player of the Year.

For his senior season Lewis transferred to Duncanville High School in Duncanville, Texas, after being named the El Paso Times' All-City Co-MVP and All-State by the Texas Association of Basketball Coaches. Despite finishing with a 28–1 (14–0 in district) record, Duncanville opted out of the 2023 Class 6A state championship because they had been stripped of the 2022 state championship. Duncanville was ranked number 2 in the country by MaxPreps and number 3 by ESPN. Lewis was teammates with Ron Holland, who skipped college and played professionally for the NBA G League Ignite and was drafted 5th overall in the 2024 NBA draft. He finished the year average 16 points and 9 rebounds per game.

=== Recruiting ===
Lewis was a consensus four-star recruit and a top 100 player in the 2023 class, according to major recruiting services. He committed to Arizona on March 9, 2022, after receiving offers from Houston, SMU and Texas Tech.

College recruiting
Name	Hometown	School	Height	Weight	Commit date
KJ Lewis; SG	Duncanville, TX	Duncanville (TX)	6 ft 4 in (1.93 m)	195 lb (88 kg)	Mar 9, 2022
KJ Lewis; SG	Recruit ratings: Rivals: 247Sports: ESPN: (81)				
Overall recruit ranking: Rivals: 68 247Sports: 85
Note: In many cases, Scout, Rivals, 247Sports, On3, and ESPN may conflict in their listings of height and weight.; In these cases, the average was taken. ESPN grades are on a 100-point scale.; Sources: "Arizona 2023 Basketball Commitments". Rivals.; "2023 Arizona Wildcats Recruiting Class". ESPN.; "2023 Team Ranking". Rivals.

== College career ==
=== Arizona ===
==== Freshman ====
In his college debut, Lewis scored 8 points off the bench along with four rebounds, four assists and five steals in a 122–59 win over Morgan State. Lewis scored a career high 18 points against rival UCLA on March 7, 2024, helping Arizona to a 88–65 win.

Following the 2024 season, Lewis tested the NBA draft waters but turned down an NBA G League Elite Camp invite and decided to return for his Sophomore season.

==== Sophomore ====
Lewis appeared in 37 games during his sophomore season, including six starts for a Wildcats team that advanced to the Sweet 16 of that season's NCAA tournament.

=== Georgetown ===
Following his sophomore season, Lewis entered the transfer portal and transferred to Georgetown University. He followed in the footsteps of fellow Duncanville alum Micah Peavy, who had transferred to Georgetown the previous season before entering the NBA Draft.

Lewis appeared in 28 games as a junior at Georgetown. On February 24, 2026, he suffered an ankle injury during a game against Marquette which caused him to miss the remainder of the season. At the time of his injury, Lewis led the team in scoring and steals, and had been named to the Big East weekly honor roll five separate times. He was later named to the All-Big East third team at the conclusion of the regular season.

On March 24, 2026, Lewis announced his intention to enter the transfer portal for the second consecutive season.

=== USC ===
On April 14, 2026, Lewis announced that he would be transferring to the University of Southern California.

== Personal life ==
When he was ten years old, Lewis drew a picture that said he was going to attend and play basketball at the University of Arizona.

== Career statistics ==
Legend
GP	Games played	GS	Games started	MPG	Minutes per game
FG%	Field goal percentage	3P%	3-point field goal percentage	FT%	Free throw percentage
RPG	Rebounds per game	APG	Assists per game	SPG	Steals per game
BPG	Blocks per game	PPG	Points per game	**Bold**	Career high

=== College ===
Year	Team	GP	GS	MPG	FG%	3P%	FT%	RPG	APG	SPG	BPG	PPG
2023–24	Arizona	36	0	18.5	**.466**	**.341**	.792	3.1	1.9	1.1	.3	6.1
2024–25	Arizona	**37**	6	25.9	.429	.188	**.807**	4.6	**2.9**	1.3	**.8**	10.8
2025–26	Georgetown	28	**27**	**30.0**	.408	.305	.752	**5.1**	2.5	**2.1**	.6	**14.9**
Career		101	33	24.3	.428	.274	.782	4.2	2.4	1.4	.6	10.3
