= Jaylon Jones (American football, born 2002) =

American football player (born 2002)

No. 42 – Tennessee Titans
- Position: Cornerback
- Roster status: Active

Personal information
- Born: April 3, 2002 (age 24); Cibolo, Texas, U.S.
- Listed height: 6 ft 2 in (1.88 m)
- Listed weight: 203 lb (92 kg)

Career information
- High school: Byron P. Steele (Cibolo)
- College: Texas A&M (2020–2022)
- NFL draft: 2023: 7th round, 221st overall pick

Career history
- Indianapolis Colts (2023–2026); Tennessee Titans (2026–present)

Career NFL statistics as of 2025
- Total tackles: 162
- Forced fumbles: 1
- Pass deflections: 21
- Interceptions: 2
- Stats at Pro Football Reference

Jaylon Jones (born April 3, 2002) is an American professional football cornerback for the Tennessee Titans of the National Football League (NFL). He played college football for the Texas A&M Aggies.

== Early life ==
Jones attended Byron P. Steele II High School in Cibolo, Texas. As a senior in 2019 Under Armour All-American. A five-star recruit, Jones committed to Texas A&M University to play college football.

== College career ==
Jones started all 10 games as a true freshman at Texas A&M in 2020. He finished the season with 30 tackles and one interception. As a sophomore in 2021, he started all 13 games, recording 35 tackles and two interceptions. He returned to A&M as a starter in 2022.

== Professional career ==
=== Pre-draft ===
NFL draft analyst Cory Giddings of Bleacher Report ranked Jones as the 16th best cornerback in the draft (114th overall) and projected him to be a fourth round pick. Scouts Inc. listed Jones as the 27th best cornerback prospect (211th overall) in the draft. NFL.com media analyst Lance Zierlein projected him to be a fourth round pick.

Pre-draft measurables
Height	Weight	Arm length	Hand span	Wingspan	40-yard dash	10-yard split	20-yard split	20-yard shuttle	Three-cone drill	Vertical jump	Broad jump	Bench press
6 ft 2 1/8 in (1.88 m)	200 lb (91 kg)	30 3/4 in (0.78 m)	9 in (0.23 m)	6 ft 4 3/4 in (1.95 m)	4.53 s	1.51 s	2.55 s	4.30 s	6.88 s	38.0 in (0.97 m)	10 ft 2 in (3.10 m)	14 reps
All values from NFL Combine/Pro Day

=== Indianapolis Colts ===
The Indianapolis Colts selected Jones in the seventh round (221st overall) of the 2023 NFL draft. He was the 29th cornerback drafted and one of three cornerbacks selected by the Colts in 2023, following second-round pick (44th overall) JuJu Brents and fifth-round pick (138th overall) Darius Rush.

External videos
- Colts select Jaylon Jones No. 221
- Post-draft Media: Jaylon Jones

On May 5, 2023, the Indianapolis Colts signed Jones to a four–year, $3.95 million rookie contract that includes a signing bonus of $113,480.

==== 2023 ====
Throughout training camp, he competed for a roster spot as a backup cornerback against Darrell Baker Jr., Isaiah Rodgers, Dallis Flowers, Chris Lammons, Ameer Speed, and Tony Brown. Head coach Shane Steichen named Jones a backup and listed him as the sixth cornerback on the depth chart to begin the season, behind Kenny Moore II, Dallis Flowers, JuJu Brents, Darrell Baker, and Toby Brown.

On September 10, 2023, Jones made his professional regular season debut in the Indianapolis Colts' home-opener against the Jacksonville Jaguars, but was limited to 19 snaps, with all but one on special teams as they lost 21–31. Entering Week 5, he was promoted to being the third cornerback on the depth chart after injuries to Dallis Flowers and Darrell Baker Jr. On October 8, 2023, Jones earned his first career start as a nickelback and recorded two combined tackles (one solo) during a 23–16 win against the Tennessee Titans. Prior to Week 8, Jones was named the No. 2 starting cornerback after JuJu Brents suffered a quadriceps injury and remained inactive for six games (Weeks 8–14). In Week 13, he set a season-high with six combined tackles (five solo) and made one pass deflection as the Colts won in overtime 31–28 at the Tennessee Titans. He finished his rookie season with a total of 44 combined tackles (33 solo) and five pass breakups through 17 games and 10 starts. He received an overall grade of 53.1 from Pro Football Focus as a rookie in 2023.

==== 2024 ====
Throughout training camp, he competed against JuJu Brents to be the No. 2 starting cornerback under defensive coordinator Gus Bradley. Head coach Shane Steichen named Jones the No. 2 starting cornerback to begin the season and paired him with Kenny Moore II.

On September 8, 2024, Jones started in the Indianapolis Colts' home-opener against the Houston Texans and set a season-high with nine combined tackles (seven solo) and broke up a pass during their 27–29 loss. On September 22, 2024, Jones made five combined tackles (four solo), two pass deflections, and set a career-high with two interceptions during a 21–16 win against the Chicago Bears. He made his first career interception in the second quarter on a pass attempt thrown by Caleb Williams to wide receiver DeAndre Carter and returned it five–yards. His Week 3 performance earned him AFC Defensive Player of the Week. He started all 17 games in 2024 and had a total of 100 combined tackles (66 solo), 12 pass deflections, and two interceptions. He received an overall grade of 67.4 from Pro Football Focus in 2024.

==== 2025 ====
The Colts placed Jones on injured reserve with a hamstring injury on September 13, 2025. He was activated on November 1, ahead of the team's Week 9 matchup against the Pittsburgh Steelers.

On September 8, 2026, Jones was waived by the Colts.

=== Tennessee Titans ===
On September 10, 2026, Jones signed with the Tennessee Titans.
