= Schertz-Cibolo-Universal City Independent School District =

School district in Texas, United States

Location
- 1060 Elbel Road, Schertz, Texas United States

District information
- Type: Public
- Motto: A District with Passion & Purpose
- Grades: Pre-K through 12
- Established: April 24, 1961; 64 years ago
- Superintendent: Mrs. Paige Meloni
- Governing agency: Texas Education Agency
- Schools: 16
- Budget: $174 million (2018–19)
- NCES District ID: 4839480

Students and staff
- Students: 15,875 (2021–22)
- Teachers: 987.6 (2021–22)
- Staff: 1,824.3 (2021–22)

Other information
- Website: scucisd.org

Schertz-Cibolo-Universal City Independent School District (SCUC ISD) is a public school district based in Schertz, Texas, United States. In addition to Schertz, the district serves the city of Cibolo and parts of Universal City and a small portion of Marion. The district lies in two counties: Guadalupe and Bexar. In 2022, the school district was rated "B" by the Texas Education Agency, with a score of 87 out of 100.

== History ==
SCUC ISD was formed by merges of existing schools and school systems during the twentieth century. Early local schools included Cibolo Valley school and Lower Valley School In 1916, Cibolo voters approved a bond election to build a new high school. The Schertz and Cibolo School Districts combined in the 1930s. On April 24, 1961, the school system became an independent school district. In 1966, the community served by the Lower Valley School voted to consolidate with the Schertz-Cibolo system. In 1967, Universal City was added to the name.

== Schools ==
=== High schools ===
The high schools cover grades 9-12.

- Allison Steele Enhanced Learning Center (Schertz)
- Byron P. Steele II High School (Cibolo)
- Samuel Clemens High School (Schertz)

=== Junior high schools ===
The junior high schools cover grades 7–8.

- J. Frank Dobie Junior High (Cibolo)
- Ray D. Corbett Junior High (Schertz)

=== Intermediate schools ===
The intermediate schools cover grades 5–6.

- Barbara Jordan Intermediate (Cibolo)
- Laura Ingalls Wilder Intermediate (Schertz)
- Elaine S. Schlather Intermediate (Cibolo)

=== Elementary schools ===
The elementary schools cover grades K-4, as well as preschool.

- Cibolo Valley Elementary (Cibolo)
- Green Valley Elementary (Schertz)
- Maxine & Lutrell Watts Elementary (Cibolo)
- Norma J. Paschal Elementary (Schertz)
- O.G. Wiederstein Elementary (Cibolo)
- Rose Garden Elementary (Schertz)
  - In August 2018, the former Rose Garden Elementary (Universal City) closed down.
- Schertz Elementary (Schertz)
- John A. Sippel Elementary (Schertz)
