= Kenny Johnson (basketball) =

American basketball coach

Current position
- Title: Assistant coach
- Team: Indiana
- Conference: Big Ten

Biographical details
- Born: Oxon Hill, Maryland, U.S.
- Education: Maryland

Coaching career (HC unless noted)
- 2002–2006: Eleanor Roosevelt HS (assistant)
- 2007–2011: Paul VI HS (assistant)
- 2011–2012: Towson (assistant)
- 2012–2014: Indiana (assistant)
- 2014–2017: Louisville (assistant)
- 2018–2020: La Salle (assistant)
- 2022–2024: Rhode Island (assistant)
- 2024–2025: Georgetown (assistant)
- 2025–present: Indiana (assistant)

Kenny Johnson is an American basketball coach who is currently in his second stint as an assistant coach for Indiana University. He formerly was an assistant coach at Georgetown, Rhode Island, La Salle, Louisville, and Towson.

== Early years ==
Johnson attended Oxon Hill High School in his hometown of Oxon Hill, Maryland, where he was named Science and Technology Student of the Year in 1994. He had his playing career cut short by several knee injuries during his second season of varsity basketball. The recipient of a Benjamin Banneker Scholarship, he went on to attend the University of Maryland-College Park, where in 1999 he earned his degree in cellular biology, molecular biology, and genetics.

After graduation, he worked as a protein chemist and molecular biologist at Human Genome Sciences in Rockville, Maryland.

== Coaching career ==
=== High school (2002–2011) ===
Prior to becoming a college assistant, Johnson was very active in the DMV area high school coaching circuit, holding assistant positions at Eleanor Roosevelt High School in Greenbelt, Maryland, Dr. Henry Wise High School in Prince George's County, Maryland, and at Paul VI Catholic High School, in Fairfax, Virginia.

While a high school coach, Johnson also held the position of vice president/assistant director of basketball operations, overseeing travel and logistics, for the well-known Amateur Athletic Union (AAU) Nike Team Takeover program for six years. During that time, he also served as head coach of the program's 16U (age-16-and-under) team. During his tenure, the program produced at least 53 NCAA Division I players and four future National Basketball Association players.

=== College (2012–present) ===
==== Towson ====
Johnson's first collegiate coaching job was an assistant to Pat Skerry at Towson University during the 2011-12 season.

==== Indiana (first stint) ====
After one season at Towson, Johnson was hired by Tom Crean as an assistant coach at Indiana University in 2012.

==== Louisville ====
On April 21, 2014, after serving for two seasons at Indiana, Johnson was hired as an assistant coach for the University of Louisville under head coach Rick Pitino, one year after Louisville won the NCAA Division 1 men's basketball tournament. NCAA investigators charged Johnson with providing improper benefits to recruits, and he was placed on administrative leave at Louisville shortly as a part of the 2017–18 NCAA Division I men's basketball corruption scandal and FBI investigation into the college basketball program in September 2017. These investigations also resulted in the firing of Pitino, athletic director Tom Jurich and assistant coach Jordan Fair. Johnson was officially fired in November 2017.

==== La Salle ====
La Salle University hired Johnson in May 2018 to serve under the new men's basketball coach Ashley Howard. On May 11, 2020, after being named in a Notice of Allegations regarding providing benefits to a recruit at Louisville, Johnson was fired from La Salle.

==== Rhode Island ====
Johnson next was an assistant coach at the University of Rhode Island under head coach Archie Miller from 2022 to 2024. During his time at Rhode Island, Johnson was subject to an NCAA Show-cause penalty pertaining to his tenure at Louisville.

==== Georgetown ====
On April 15, 2024, Georgetown University announced that it had hired Johnson to serve as an assistant coach under head coach Ed Cooley for the 2024–2025 season.

==== Indiana (second stint) ====
Following a single season at Georgetown (and more than a decade after his initial departure from the Hoosiers' program), Johnson joined the staff of incoming Indiana Head Coach Darian DeVries.

== Personal ==
Johnson is married to his wife, Montoya, and has three sons, Amare, Mekai and Kash, and one daughter Akylah.
