= Vince Iwuchukwu =

Nigerian basketball player

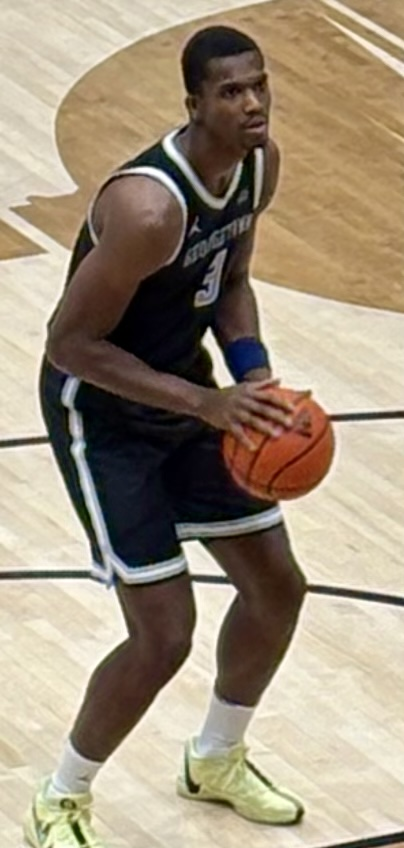
- Iwuchukwu at Georgetown in 2025

No. 3 – Georgetown Hoyas
- Position: Center
- League: Big East Conference

Personal information
- Born: April 17, 2003 (age 23) Mannheim, Germany
- Listed height: 7 ft 2 in (2.18 m)
- Listed weight: 267 lb (121 kg)

Career information
- High school: Robert G. Cole (San Antonio, Texas); La Lumiere School (Springfield, Indiana); Montverde Academy (Montverde, Florida); Southern California Academy (Castaic, California)
- College: USC (2022–2024); St. John's (2024–2025); Georgetown (2025–present)

Vincent Iwuchukwu Jr. (born April 17, 2003) is a Nigerian college basketball player for the Georgetown Hoyas of the Big East Conference. He previously played for the USC Trojans and the St. John's Red Storm.

== Early life and high school ==
Iwuchukwu grew up in a military family that traveled frequently, and didn't begin playing organized basketball until he reached high school. He played for four different high school programs and impressed scouts at each stop, graduating as a four-star high school recruit in the class of 2022.

=== Recruiting ===
Iwuchukwu committed to play college basketball at USC over offers from Baylor, Kansas, UCLA, and Texas.

College recruiting
Name	Hometown	School	Height	Weight	Commit date
Vincent Iwuchukwu; C	San Antonio, TX	Southern California Academy (CA)	7 ft 0 in (2.13 m)	220 lb (100 kg)	Sep 17, 2021
Vincent Iwuchukwu; C	Recruit ratings: Rivals: 247Sports: ESPN: (89)				
Overall recruit ranking: Rivals: 29 247Sports: 25 ESPN: 35
Note: In many cases, Scout, Rivals, 247Sports, On3, and ESPN may conflict in their listings of height and weight.; In these cases, the average was taken. ESPN grades are on a 100-point scale.; Sources: "USC 2022 Basketball Commitments". Rivals.; "2022 USC Trojans Recruiting Class". ESPN.; "2022 Team Ranking". Rivals.

== College career ==
=== USC ===
Iwuchukwu's college career was jeopardized before it began. Weeks after arriving at USC prior to his freshman season, he suffered a life-threatening cardiac arrest during a routine practice. Iwuchukwu was hospitalized and doctors were unsure if he would be able to continue playing basketball. He ultimately received an implantable cardioverter-defibrillator and was able to make his collegiate debut on January 12, 2023.

The cardiac arrest appeared to stunt Iwuchukwu's development, and he left USC after averaging 5.5 points and 3.8 rebounds per game during his sophomore season.

=== St. John's ===
Before his junior season, Iwuchukwu transferred to St. John's to play for Head Coach Rick Pitino. He played sparingly for the Red Storm, and entered the NCAA transfer portal for the second time after the season concluded.

=== Georgetown ===
Iwuchukwu committed to play his senior season for the Georgetown Hoyas. After averaging career highs in all major statistical categories across his first four games for the Hoyas, he was forced to miss more than a month of the season due to an undisclosed medical procedure. Iwuchukwu returned to the team in January 2026 and finished the season on a positive note. He scored a career-high 25 points in a victory over Providence in the regular season finale, and his 17 points and 14 rebounds led the Hoyas past DePaul in the first round of the Big East Tournament.

During his senior season, Iwuchukwu requested, but did not receive, a waiver from the NCAA for an additional season of college eligibility due to the disruption caused to his career by his cardiac arrest. On August 27, 2026, shortly after receiving a temporary restraining order against the NCAA that made him eligible to play a fifth season of college basketball, Iwuchukwu announced that he would return to Georgetown.

== Career statistics ==
Legend
GP	Games played	GS	Games started	MPG	Minutes per game
FG%	Field goal percentage	3P%	3-point field goal percentage	FT%	Free throw percentage
RPG	Rebounds per game	APG	Assists per game	SPG	Steals per game
BPG	Blocks per game	PPG	Points per game	**Bold**	Career high

=== College ===
Year	Team	GP	GS	MPG	FG%	3P%	FT%	RPG	APG	SPG	BPG	PPG
2022–23	USC	14	5	13.8	.509	.000	**.792**	2.5	.3	.1	**1.0**	5.4
2023–24	USC	31	**11**	15.7	.504	.000	.697	3.8	**.6**	.4	.6	5.5
2024–25	St. John's	**34**	1	7.2	.542	.000	.722	1.7	.1	.1	.5	2.7
2025–26	Georgetown	24	6	**23.1**	**.549**	**.375**	.755	**6.1**	.5	**.8**	.8	**11.6**
Career		103	23	14.3	.529	.300	.738	3.5	.4	.3	.7	6.0

== Personal life ==
Iwuchukwu is the son of Anastacia and Vincent Iwuchukwu Sr. He has four siblings, including his younger sister Vivian who is also a college basketball player.
