= Byron P. Steele II High School =

Location
- 1300 FM 1103; Cibolo, Texas 78108; United States; 29.5762158°N 98.2194337°W

Information
- Type: Public High School
- Motto: Leadership, Character, Commitment, Service, Learning
- Established: 2005; 21 years ago
- School district: Schertz-Cibolo-Universal City Independent School District
- Principal: Justin Linthicum
- Grades: 9-12
- Enrollment: 2,886 (2025-2026)
- Colors: Black; Silver
- Athletics conference: UIL Class 6A
- Nickname: Knights
- Website: Byron P. Steele II High School

Byron P. Steele II High School, also known simply as Cibolo Steele, is a public high school in Cibolo, Texas. It is operated by the Schertz-Cibolo-Universal City Independent School District, and classified as a 6A school by the UIL.

For the 2022–2023 school year, the school was given a "B" by the Texas Education Agency.

== History ==
The school first opened for the 2005-2006 school year. It was named for Dr. Byron P. Steele II, the longest-serving Superintendent in the history of the Schertz-Cibolo-Universal City Independent School District. Steele High School was the second high school established in the district.

== Notable alumni ==
- Tommy Armstrong Jr., football player
- Malcolm Brown, football player
- Jaylon Jones, football player
- Langston Love, basketball player
- Meighan Simmons, basketball player
- Terence Steele, football player
- Caden Sterns, football player
