= Malik Mack =

American basketball player (born 2005)

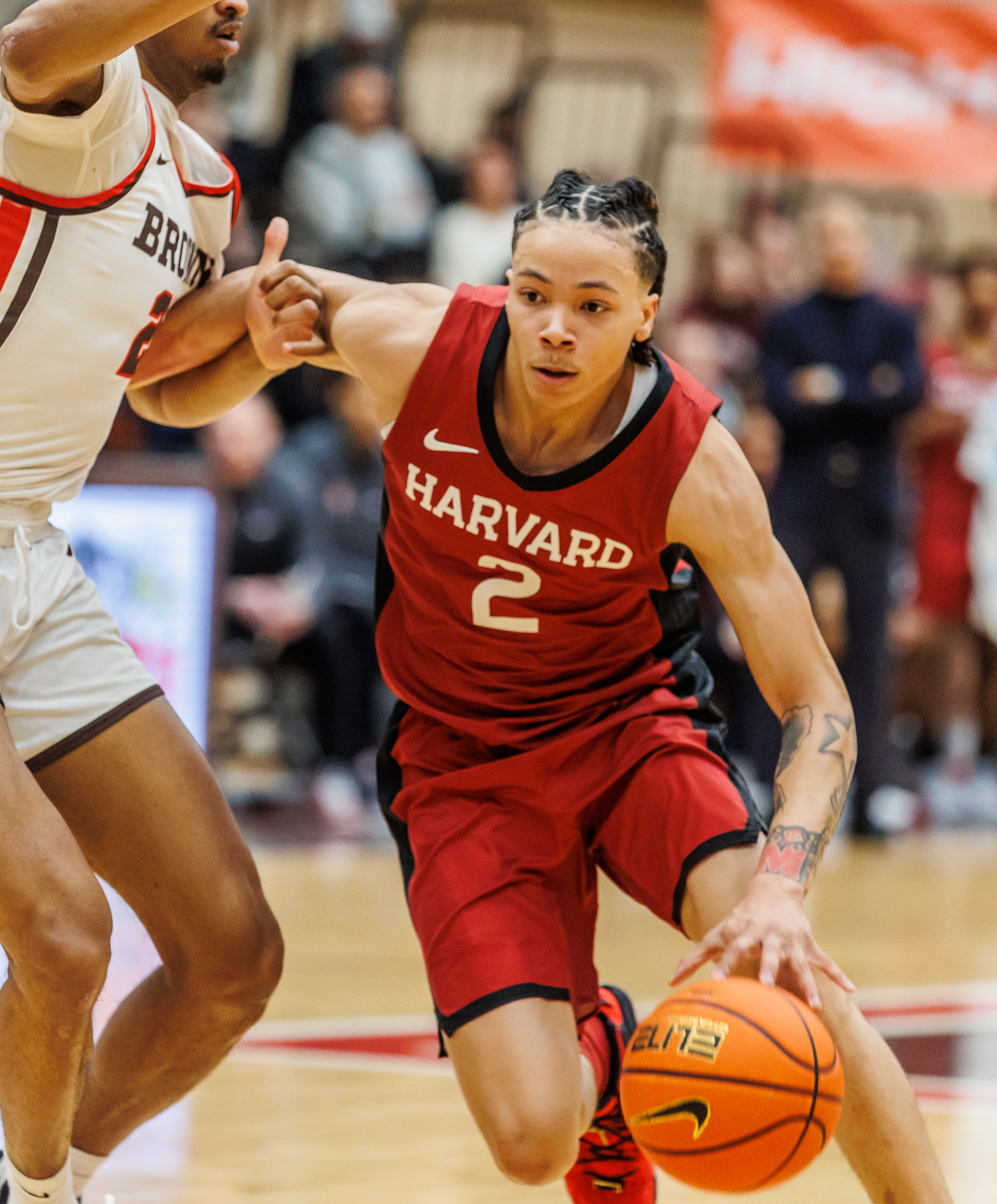
- Mack at Harvard

No. 24 – Providence Friars
- Position: Point guard
- Conference: Big East Conference

Personal information
- Born: March 4, 2005 (age 21) Oxon Hill, Maryland, U.S.
- Listed height: 6 ft 1 in (1.85 m)
- Listed weight: 175 lb (79 kg)

Career information
- High school: St. John's College (Washington, D.C.)
- College: Harvard (2023–2024); Georgetown (2024–2026); Providence (2026–present)

Career highlights
- Ivy League Rookie of the Year (2024)

Malik Mack (born March 4, 2005), nicknamed "Swae", is an American college basketball player for the Providence Friars of the Big East Conference. He previously played for the Harvard Crimson and Georgetown Hoyas.

== Early life and high school ==
Mack grew up in Oxon Hill, Maryland and attended St. John's College High School in Washington, D.C.. He averaged 15.4 points, 5.2 assists, 4.9 rebounds, and 1.8 steals per game as a senior.

=== Recruiting ===
Mack committed to play college basketball at Harvard over offers from Ole Miss, Rhode Island, Rice, and Saint Peter's.

College recruiting
Name	Hometown	School	Height	Weight	Commit date
Malik Mack; PG	Oxon Hill, MD	St. John's College (DC)	6 ft 1 in (1.85 m)	160 lb (73 kg)	Sep 23, 2022
Malik Mack; PG	Recruit ratings: 247Sports:				
Overall recruit ranking:
Note: In many cases, Scout, Rivals, 247Sports, On3, and ESPN may conflict in their listings of height and weight.; In these cases, the average was taken. ESPN grades are on a 100-point scale.; Sources: "Harvard 2023 Basketball Commitments". Rivals.; "2023 Harvard Crimson Recruiting Class". ESPN.; "2023 Team Ranking". Rivals.

== College career ==
=== Harvard ===
Mack entered his freshman year at Harvard as the Crimson's starting point guard. He contracted mononucleosis ten games into the season. Mack returned on January 6, 2024, after missing three games. He was named the Ivy League Rookie of the Year after averaging 17.2 points, 4.8 assists, 4.0 rebounds, and 1.3 steals per game. After the season, Mack entered the NCAA transfer portal.

=== Georgetown ===
==== Sophomore ====
Mack transferred to Georgetown in 2024. Prior to the 2024-25 season, he was named to the pre-season watch list for the Bob Cousy Award, which honors the top point guard in college basketball. Mack completed a strong sophomore season for the Hoyas, leading the team in assists and scoring a game-high 37 points against Washington State in the opening round of the College Basketball Crown to lead Georgetown to its first postseason victory since 2015.

==== Junior ====
Mack was named to the preseason All-Big East Third Team ahead of the 2025-26 season. He was named to the Big East Weekly Honor Roll twice en route to leading the Hoyas in assists for the second consecutive season. He averaged 13.6 points, 4.1 assists and 3.0 rebounds per game for the Hoyas.

On March 31, 2026, Mack announced his intention to enter the transfer portal for a second time.

=== Providence ===
On April 21, 2026, Mack announced that he would be transferring to Providence College.

== Career statistics ==
Legend
GP	Games played	GS	Games started	MPG	Minutes per game
FG%	Field goal percentage	3P%	3-point field goal percentage	FT%	Free throw percentage
RPG	Rebounds per game	APG	Assists per game	SPG	Steals per game
BPG	Blocks per game	PPG	Points per game	**Bold**	Career high

=== College ===
Year	Team	GP	GS	MPG	FG%	3P%	FT%	RPG	APG	SPG	BPG	PPG
2023–24	Harvard	24	24	33.3	**.410**	.341	.813	**4.0**	**4.8**	**1.3**	.1	**17.2**
2024–25	Georgetown	32	32	**34.8**	.381	**.355**	.730	3.6	4.3	**1.3**	**.3**	12.9
2025–26	Georgetown	**34**	**34**	32.3	.381	.298	**.818**	3.0	4.1	.9	.1	13.6
Career		90	90	33.5	.389	.329	.793	3.5	4.4	1.1	.2	14.3
