= DeShawn Harris-Smith =

American basketball player (born 2004)

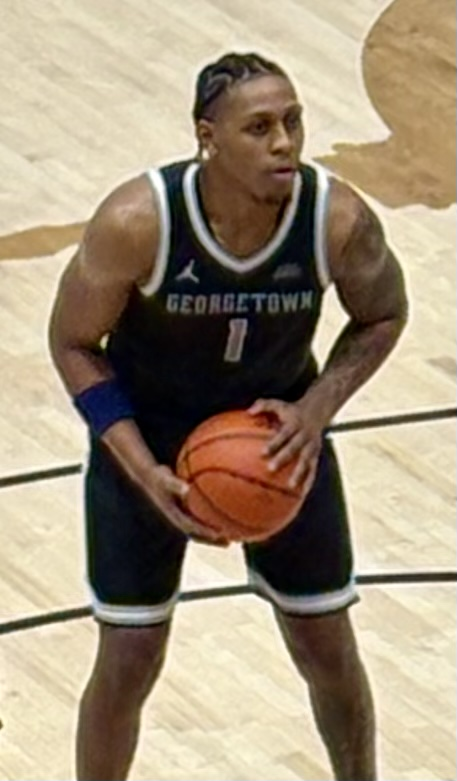
- Harris-Smith at Georgetown in 2025

No. 5 – Delaware Fightin' Blue Hens
- Position: Shooting guard
- League: Conference USA

Personal information
- Born: August 10, 2004 (age 22) Arlington, Virginia, U.S.
- Listed height: 6 ft 5 in (1.96 m)
- Listed weight: 224 lb (102 kg)

Career information
- High school: Paul VI Catholic (Chantilly, Virginia)
- College: Maryland (2023–2025); Georgetown (2025–2026); Delaware (2026–present)

Career highlights
- Big Ten All-Freshman Team (2024)

DeShawn Harris-Smith (born August 10, 2004) is an American college basketball player for the Delaware Fightin' Blue Hens of Conference USA. He previously played for the Maryland Terrapins and Georgetown Hoyas.

== Early life and high school ==
Harris-Smith grew up in Arlington, Virginia and attended Paul VI Catholic High School. He averaged 14.4 points, 7.8 rebounds, 4.5 assists and 2.2 steals per game as a junior. Harris-Smith was named the Virginia Gatorade Player of the Year and the Washington Catholic Athletic Conference Player of the Year after averaging 17.8 points, 8.0 rebounds, 7.0 assists, and 2.6 steals per game as a senior.

=== Recruiting ===
Harris-Smith was rated a four-star recruit and committed to play college basketball at Maryland over offers from Villanova, Indiana, Xavier, and Penn State.

College recruiting
Name	Hometown	School	Height	Weight	Commit date
DeShawn Harris-Smith; SF	Fairfax, VA	Paul VI Catholic (VA)	6 ft 5 in (1.96 m)	190 lb (86 kg)	Aug 24, 2022
DeShawn Harris-Smith; SF	Recruit ratings: Rivals: 247Sports: ESPN: (87)				
Overall recruit ranking: Rivals: 37 247Sports: 32 ESPN: 43
Note: In many cases, Scout, Rivals, 247Sports, On3, and ESPN may conflict in their listings of height and weight.; In these cases, the average was taken. ESPN grades are on a 100-point scale.; Sources: "Maryland 2023 Basketball Commitments". Rivals.; "2023 Maryland Terrapins Recruiting Class". ESPN.; "2023 Team Ranking". Rivals.

== College career ==
=== Maryland ===
Harris-Smith enrolled at the University of Maryland in July 2023 to take part in summer practices. He started at shooting guard in the Terrapins' season-opening 68–53 win over Mount St. Mary's and scored 12 points with four rebounds, two steals, and two assists. Harris-Smith became the first true freshman to start a season opener for Maryland since Aaron Wiggins and Jalen Smith had done so in 2018. Harris-Smith was named to the Big Ten Conference All-Freshman team at the end of the season after averaging 7.3 points, 4.3 rebounds, and 2.2 assists per game.

=== Georgetown ===
At the conclusion of Harris-Smith's sophomore season, he entered the transfer portal and transferred to Georgetown University. He recorded the first double-double of his collegiate career in his first appearance for the Hoyas, a win over the Japanese team in the 2025 GLOBL JAM exhibition tournament.

In December 2025 it was announced that Harris-Smith was taking a leave of absence from the Hoyas for personal reasons. He had previously appeared in six games for the team.

=== Delaware ===
Harris-Smith entered the transfer portal for a second time in April 2026, and announced that he would transfer to the University of Delaware.

== Career statistics ==
Legend
GP	Games played	GS	Games started	MPG	Minutes per game
FG%	Field goal percentage	3P%	3-point field goal percentage	FT%	Free throw percentage
RPG	Rebounds per game	APG	Assists per game	SPG	Steals per game
BPG	Blocks per game	PPG	Points per game	**Bold**	Career high

=== College ===
Year	Team	GP	GS	MPG	FG%	3P%	FT%	RPG	APG	SPG	BPG	PPG
2023–24	Maryland	33	**30**	**29.5**	.368	**.202**	**.580**	**4.3**	**2.2**	**.9**	**.1**	**7.3**
2024–25	Maryland	**36**	4	15.3	.395	.200	.500	2.4	1.0	.4	0	2.5
2025–26	Georgetown	6	0	16.7	**.600**	.000	**.700**	2.5	.5	.7	0	5.2
Career		75	34	21.7	.388	.198	.570	3.2	1.5	.7	.1	4.8
