= Jeff Battle =

American basketball coach

Current position
- Title: Associate Head Coach
- Team: Georgetown
- Conference: Big East

Biographical details
- Born: October 26, 1961 (age 65); Philadelphia, Pennsylvania, U.S.
- Education: Marshall University

Playing career
- 1981–1985: Marshall

Coaching career (HC unless noted)
- 1985–1986: Marshall (GA)
- 1986–1988: Delaware (GA)
- 1988–1990: Caesar Rodney HS
- 1990–1993: Delaware State (assistant)
- 1993–1994: Loyola (MD) (assistant)
- 1995–2001: Xavier (assistant)
- 2001–2014: Wake Forest (AHC)
- 2015–2021: Providence (assistant)
- 2021–2023: Providence (AHC)
- 2023–present: Georgetown (AHC)

Head coaching record
- Overall: 1–0 (1.000)

Accomplishments and honors

Awards
- A STEP UP Assistant Coaches Hall of Fame

Jeff Battle (born October 26, 1961) is an American college basketball coach who is currently the associate head coach of the Georgetown Hoyas men's basketball team. He formerly was an assistant coach at Providence, Wake Forest, Xavier, Loyola Maryland, Delaware State, Delaware, and Marshall.

== Early years ==
Battle grew up in Philadelphia, Pennsylvania, where he attended and played basketball at Murrell Dobbins Career and Technical Education High School.

He did not receive any scholarships to play Division I college basketball, but was given the opportunity to be a walk-on at Marshall University. Battle ultimately became the starting point guard for the Thundering Herd, and helped lead the team to consecutive appearances in the NCAA tournament.

== Coaching career ==
=== Assistant to Skip Prosser (1993–2007) ===
After his playing career at Marshall, Battle served as graduate assistant at multiple schools, as well as the head coach of Caesar Rodney High School in Camden, Delaware before accepting an offer to be an assistant coach at Loyola University Maryland under Skip Prosser. Battle worked as an assistant to Prosser for the next fourteen seasons, including stints at Loyola, Xavier, and Wake Forest. Battle was considered as a potential candidate to replace Prosser as the head coach at Wake Forest after Prosser's death in 2007.

=== Wake Forest post–Prosser (2007–2015) ===
Battle was retained as an assistant by the next two head coaches at Wake Forest after Prosser's death. He ultimately left the program after head coach Jeff Bzdelik was fired in 2015.

=== Assistant to Ed Cooley (2015–present) ===
==== Providence ====
During his tenure at Wake Forest, Battle became close with then-Boston College assistant Ed Cooley. In 2015, after Battle's departure from Wake Forest, Cooley hired him to be an assistant on his staff at Providence.

==== Georgetown ====
Cooley left Providence to take the head coaching position at Georgetown in 2023. The rest of the assistant coaching staff ultimately came with him, with Battle being named Associate Head Coach.

During Cooley's one-game suspension in 2025, Battle coached the Hoyas to a victory against Coppin State.

== Head coaching record ==
Record table
Season	Team	Overall	Conference	Standing	Postseason
Georgetown Hoyas (Big East Conference) (2025)
2025–26	Georgetown	1–0	0–0		
Georgetown:		1–0 (1.000)	0–0 (–)		
Total:		1–0 (1.000)			
National champion Postseason invitational champion Conference regular season champion Conference regular season and conference tournament champion Division regular season champion Division regular season and conference tournament champion Conference tournament champion

== Personal life ==
Battle met his wife, Joyce, in the early 1990's when the two were both assistant basketball coaches at Delaware State University. Together they had one son, named Jordan, before Joyce's death from leiomyosarcoma in 2008.
