= Thomas Sorber =

American basketball player (born 2005)

No. 12 – Oklahoma City Thunder
- Position: Center
- League: NBA

Personal information
- Born: December 25, 2005 (age 20) Trenton, New Jersey, U.S.
- Listed height: 6 ft 9 in (2.06 m)
- Listed weight: 250 lb (113 kg)

Career information
- High school: Trenton Catholic Academy (Trenton, New Jersey); Archbishop Ryan (Philadelphia, Pennsylvania)
- College: Georgetown (2024–2025)
- NBA draft: 2025: 1st round, 15th overall pick
- Drafted by: Oklahoma City Thunder
- Playing career: 2025–present

Career history
- 2025–present: Oklahoma City Thunder

Career highlights
- Third-team All-Big East (2025); Big East All-Freshman team (2025)
- Stats at NBA.com
- Stats at Basketball Reference

Thomas Francis Sorber (born December 25, 2005) is an American professional basketball player for the Oklahoma City Thunder of the National Basketball Association (NBA). He played college basketball for the Georgetown Hoyas.

== Early life and high school career ==
Sorber grew up in Trenton, New Jersey, and initially attended Trenton Catholic Academy. He transferred to Archbishop Ryan High School in Philadelphia, Pennsylvania after his freshman year. As a sophomore, Sorber averaged 16.5 points per game and led the Philadelphia Catholic League in rebounding.

=== Recruiting ===
Sorber was rated a four-star recruit and committed to playing college basketball for Georgetown over offers from Miami (Florida), Providence, and Villanova.

College recruiting
| Name | Hometown | School | Height | Weight | Commit date |
|---|---|---|---|---|---|
| Thomas Sorber; C | Trenton, NJ | Archbishop Ryan (PA) | 6 ft 9 in (2.06 m) | 250 lb (110 kg) | May 17, 2023 |
| Thomas Sorber; C | Recruit ratings: Rivals: 247Sports: ESPN: (87) | | | | |
Overall recruit ranking: Rivals: 42 247Sports: 46 ESPN: 56
Note: In many cases, Scout, Rivals, 247Sports, On3, and ESPN may conflict in their listings of height and weight.; In these cases, the average was taken. ESPN grades are on a 100-point scale.; Sources: "Georgetown 2024 Basketball Commitments". Rivals.; "2024 Georgetown Hoyas Recruiting Class". ESPN.; "2024 Team Ranking". Rivals.

== College career ==
Sorber scored 20 points and grabbed 13 rebounds in his college debut against Lehigh. He scored 25 points with nine rebounds in the next game against Fairfield and was named the Big East Conference Rookie of the Week for the first week of the season.

At the conclusion of his freshman season, Sorber was named to the All-Big East Third Team and was a unanimous selection to the Big East All-Freshman team. As a freshman, he averaged 14.5 points, 8.5 rebounds and 2.4 assists per game. On March 27, 2025, Sorber declared for the 2025 NBA draft while maintaining his college eligibility. He ultimately decided to remain in the draft and forego his remaining three years of collegiate eligibility. Several mock drafts projected that he would be a mid-first round pick.

== Professional career ==
On June 25, 2025, Sorber was selected as the 15th overall pick in the 2025 NBA draft, by the Oklahoma City Thunder. His selection made him the first player in the history of Georgetown basketball to be drafted directly into the NBA as a freshman. On September 4, Sorber sustained a torn ACL in his right knee during an offseason workout, causing him to miss the 2025–26 season.

On July 1, 2026, it was announced that Sorber would be out for at least four weeks after undergoing arthroscopic surgery on his right knee.

== Career statistics ==
Legend
| GP | Games played | GS | Games started | MPG | Minutes per game |
| FG% | Field goal percentage | 3P% | 3-point field goal percentage | FT% | Free throw percentage |
| RPG | Rebounds per game | APG | Assists per game | SPG | Steals per game |
| BPG | Blocks per game | PPG | Points per game | **Bold** | Career high |

=== College ===
| Year | Team | GP | GS | MPG | FG% | 3P% | FT% | RPG | APG | SPG | BPG | PPG |
|---|---|---|---|---|---|---|---|---|---|---|---|---|
| 2024–25 | Georgetown | 24 | 23 | 31.3 | .532 | .162 | .724 | 8.5 | 2.4 | 1.5 | 2.0 | 14.5 |

== Personal life ==
His family is from Liberia, where his late father, Peter Sorber Sr., was a star soccer player. Thomas' sister, Regina, played basketball at Alabama A&M University and brother, Peter Jr., played basketball at Morgan State University and Lincoln University.
