= 2024–25 Maryland Terrapins men's basketball team =

American college basketball season

2024–25 Maryland Terrapins men's basketball
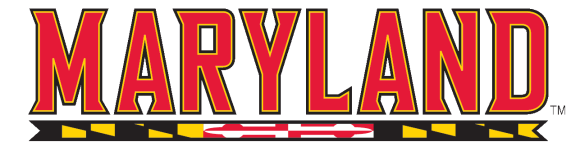

NCAA tournament, Sweet Sixteen
- Conference: Big Ten Conference

Ranking
- Coaches: No. 9
- AP: No. 9
- Record: 27–9 (14–6 Big Ten)
- Head coach: Kevin Willard (3rd season)
- Associate head coach: David Cox
- Assistant coaches: Kevin Norris; Greg Manning Jr.; Ricky Harris; Brenton Petty
- Home arena: Xfinity Center

2024–25 Big Ten Conference men's basketball standings
	Conf.				Overall
Team	W		L	PCT	W		L	PCT
No. 7 Michigan State	17	–	3	.850	30	–	7	.811
No. 9 Maryland	14	–	6	.700	27	–	9	.750
No. 10 Michigan †	14	–	6	.700	27	–	10	.730
UCLA	13	–	7	.650	23	–	11	.676
No. 16 Wisconsin	13	–	7	.650	27	–	10	.730
No. 14 Purdue	13	–	7	.650	24	–	12	.667
Illinois	12	–	8	.600	22	–	13	.629
Oregon	12	–	8	.600	25	–	10	.714
Indiana	10	–	10	.500	19	–	13	.594
Ohio State	9	–	11	.450	17	–	15	.531
Rutgers	8	–	12	.400	15	–	17	.469
Minnesota	7	–	13	.350	15	–	17	.469
Northwestern	7	–	13	.350	17	–	16	.515
USC	7	–	13	.350	17	–	18	.486
Iowa	7	–	13	.350	17	–	16	.515
Nebraska	7	–	13	.350	21	–	14	.600
Penn State	6	–	14	.300	16	–	15	.516
Washington	4	–	16	.200	13	–	18	.419
† 2025 Big Ten tournament winner Rankings from AP poll

The 2024–25 Maryland Terrapins men's basketball team represented the University of Maryland, College Park during the 2024–25 NCAA Division I men's basketball season. They were led by third-year head coach Kevin Willard and played their home games at Xfinity Center in College Park, Maryland, as a member of the Big Ten Conference. They finished the season 27–9, 14–6 in Big Ten play to finish in a tie for second place. As the No. 2 seed in the Big Ten tournament, they beat Illinois in the quarterfinals before losing to Michigan in the semifinals. They received an at-large bid to the NCAA tournament as the No. 4 seed in the West region. They defeated Grand Canyon and Colorado State to advance to the Sweet Sixteen. There, they lost to the eventual champion Florida, 87–71.

Following the season, head coach Kevin Willard left the team to take the head coaching position at Villanova. On April 1, the school named Texas A&M head coach Buzz Williams the team's new head coach.

== Previous season ==
The Terrapins finished the 2023–24 season 16–17, 7–13 in Big Ten play to finish in a tie for eleventh place. As the No. 12 seed in the Big Ten tournament, they beat Rutgers in the first round, before losing to Wisconsin in the quarterfinals. The Terrapins received a bid for the National Invitation Tournament, but declined.

== Offseason ==
=== Departures ===
Maryland departures
Name	Number	Pos.	Height	Weight	Year	Hometown	Reason for departure
Jahnathan Lamothe	0	G	6'4"	192	Freshman	Baltimore, MD	Transferred to North Carolina A&T
Jahmir Young	1	G	6'1"	185	GS Senior	Upper Marlboro, MD	Graduated
Noah Batchelor	11	G/F	6'6"	185	Sophomore	Frederick, MD	Transferred to Buffalo
Jamie Kaiser Jr.	12	F	6'6"	205	Freshman	Burke, VA	Transferred to Butler
Mady Traore	14	F	6'11"	195	Sophomore	Paris, France	Transferred to Frank Phillips College
Donta Scott	24	F	6'8"	230	GS Senior	Philadelphia, PA	Graduated
Caelum Swanton-Rodger	35	C	6'11"	220	Sophomore	Calgary, Alberta	Transferred to Old Dominion

=== Incoming transfers ===
Maryland incoming transfers
Name	Number	Pos.	Height	Weight	Year	Hometown	Previous school
Ja'Kobi Gillespie	0	G	6'1"	186	Junior	Greeneville, TN	Belmont
Rodney Rice	1	G	6'4"	198	Junior	Clinton, MD	Virginia Tech
Tafara Gapare	6	F	6'9"	215	Junior	Wellington, New Zealand	Georgia Tech
Jay Young	8	G	6'2"	180	GS Senior	Dallas, TX	Memphis
Selton Miguel	9	G	6'4"	217	GS Senior	Luanda, Angola	South Florida

=== Recruiting classes ===
==== 2024 recruiting class ====
College recruiting
Name	Hometown	School	Height	Weight	Commit date
Derik Queen; C	Baltimore, Maryland	Montverde Academy	6 ft 10 in (2.08 m)	240 lb (110 kg)	Feb 21, 2024
Derik Queen; C	Recruit ratings: Rivals: 247Sports: ESPN: (93)				
Malachi Palmer; CG	Harrisburg, Pennsylvania	Mt. Zion Prep	6 ft 5 in (1.96 m)	185 lb (84 kg)	Jan 1, 2024
Malachi Palmer; CG	Recruit ratings: Rivals: 247Sports: ESPN: (81)				
Overall recruit ranking: Rivals: 30 247Sports: 35 ESPN: —
Note: In many cases, Scout, Rivals, 247Sports, On3, and ESPN may conflict in their listings of height and weight.; In these cases, the average was taken. ESPN grades are on a 100-point scale.; Sources: "Maryland 2024 Basketball Commitments". Rivals.; "2024 Maryland Terrapins Recruiting Class". ESPN.; "2024 Team Ranking". Rivals.

==== 2025 recruiting class ====
There are no current recruits for 2025.

== Roster ==
2024–25 Maryland Terrapins men's basketball team
Players
Coaches

Pos.	#	Name	Height	Weight	Year	Previous school	Hometown
G	0	Ja'Kobi Gillespie	6 ft 1 in (1.85 m)	186 lb (84 kg)	Jr	Belmont	Greeneville, TN
G	1	Rodney Rice	6 ft 4 in (1.93 m)	198 lb (90 kg)	So	Virginia Tech	Clinton, MD
G	2	Jahari Long (injured)	6 ft 5 in (1.96 m)	200 lb (91 kg)	GS	Seton Hall	Houston, TX
C	4	Braden Pierce (injured)	7 ft 0 in (2.13 m)	245 lb (111 kg)	RS Fr	IMG Academy	Woodstock, GA
G	5	DeShawn Harris-Smith	6 ft 5 in (1.96 m)	208 lb (94 kg)	So	Paul VI Catholic HS	Woodbridge, VA
F	6	Tafara Gapare	6 ft 9 in (2.06 m)	215 lb (98 kg)	Jr	Georgia Tech	Wellington, New Zealand
G	7	Malachi Palmer	6 ft 6 in (1.98 m)	212 lb (96 kg)	Fr	Mt. Zion Prep	Harrisburg, PA
G	8	Jay Young	6 ft 2 in (1.88 m)	180 lb (82 kg)	GS	Memphis	Dallas, TX
G	9	Selton Miguel	6 ft 4 in (1.93 m)	217 lb (98 kg)	GS	South Florida	Luanda, Angola
F	10	Julian Reese	6 ft 9 in (2.06 m)	252 lb (114 kg)	Sr	Saint Frances Academy	Baltimore, MD
G	13	Chance Stephens (injured)	6 ft 3 in (1.91 m)	185 lb (84 kg)	RS So	Loyola Marymount	Riverside, CA
F	22	Jordan Geronimo	6 ft 6 in (1.98 m)	225 lb (102 kg)	GS	Indiana	Newark, NJ
C	25	Derik Queen	6 ft 10 in (2.08 m)	246 lb (112 kg)	Fr	Montverde Academy	Baltimore, MD
G	30	Lukas Sotell (W)	6 ft 3 in (1.91 m)	180 lb (82 kg)	So	Stamford HS	Stamford, CT
G	40	Ben Murphy (W)	6 ft 1 in (1.85 m)	210 lb (95 kg)	Sr	Franklin HS	Reisterstown, MD

Head coach

- Kevin Willard (Pittsburgh)

Assistant coach(es)

- David Cox (William & Mary)
- Kevin Norris (Miami (FL))
- Greg Manning Jr. (Loyola (MD))
- Ricky Harris (UMass)
- Brenton Petty (Fordham)

Legend

- (C) Team captain
- (S) Suspended
- (I) Ineligible
- (W) Walk-on
- Injured
- Current redshirt

Roster
Last update: July 16, 2024

=== Depth chart ===
Pos.	Starting 5	Bench 1	Bench 2	Bench 3
C	Derik Queen	Tafara Gapare		Braden Pierce (injured)
PF	Julian Reese	Jordan Geronimo
SF	Selton Miguel	Malachi Palmer		Jahari Long (injured)
SG	Rodney Rice	DeShawn Harris-Smith	Ben Murphy	Chance Stephens (injured)
PG	Ja'Kobi Gillespie	Jay Young	Lukas Sotell

== Schedule and results ==
Date time, TV	Rank^{#}	Opponent^{#}	Result	Record	High points	High rebounds	High assists	Site (attendance) city, state
Regular season
November 4, 2024*; 7:00 p.m., B1G+		Manhattan	W 79–49	1–0	22 – Queen	20 – Queen	5 – Gillespie	Xfinity Center (13,152); College Park, MD
November 8, 2024*; 8:00 p.m., BTN		Mount St. Mary's	W 86–52	2–0	28 – Rice	10 – Reese	3 – Queen	Xfinity Center (11,726); College Park, MD
November 11, 2024*; 7:00 p.m., B1G+		Florida A&M	W 84–53	3–0	21 – Reese	9 – Reese	3 – Queen	Xfinity Center (10,057); College Park, MD
November 15, 2024*; 8:00 p.m., FS1		No. 15 Marquette	L 74–78	3–1	24 – Tied	10 – Reese	3 – Tied	Xfinity Center (16,124); College Park, MD
November 19, 2024*; 7:00 p.m., B1G+		Canisius	W 108–37	4–1	20 – Reese	12 – Reese	6 – Gillespie	Xfinity Center (9,485); College Park, MD
November 24, 2024*; 1:00 p.m., ESPN		vs. Villanova; Saatva Empire Classic	W 76–75	5–1	22 – Queen	11 – Queen	5 – Queen	Prudential Center (7,117); Newark, NJ
November 27, 2024*; 4:30 p.m., BTN		Bucknell	W 91–67	6–1	19 – Gapare	8 – Queen	4 – Harris-Smith	Xfinity Center (10,744); College Park, MD
December 1, 2024*; 12:00 p.m., BTN		Alcorn State	W 96–58	7–1	20 – Queen	11 – Reese	5 – Tied	Xfinity Center (9,504); College Park, Maryland
December 4, 2024; 6:30 p.m., BTN		Ohio State	W 83–59	8–1 (1–0)	23 – Gillespie	11 – Queen	4 – Gillespie	Xfinity Center (13,793); College Park, Maryland
December 8, 2024; 12:00 p.m., BTN		at No. 8 Purdue	L 78–83	8–2 (1–1)	26 – Queen	12 – Queen	4 – Tied	Mackey Arena (14,876); West Lafayette, IN
December 17, 2024*; 7:30 p.m., BTN		Saint Francis	W 111–57	9–2	24 – Miguel	12 – Reese	6 – Gillespie	Xfinity Center (10,555); College Park, MD
December 21, 2024*; 12:00 p.m., ESPN2		vs. Syracuse; Gotham Classic	W 87–60	10–2	24 – Miguel	13 – Reese	11 – Gillespie	Barclays Center (8,022); Brooklyn, NY
December 28, 2024*; 12:00 p.m., BTN		Maryland Eastern Shore	W 81–66	11–2	23 – Reese	14 – Queen	9 – Gillespie	Xfinity Center (11,058); College Park, MD
January 2, 2025; 9:30 p.m., BTN		at Washington	L 69–75	11–3 (1–2)	22 – Reese	7 – Reese	2 – Tied	Alaska Airlines Arena (7,922); Seattle, WA
January 5, 2025; 4:00 p.m., Peacock		at No. 9 Oregon	L 79–83	11–4 (1–3)	19 – Rice	6 – Reese	4 – Rice	Matthew Knight Arena (7,427); Eugene, OR
January 10, 2025; 8:00 p.m., FOX		No. 22 UCLA	W 79–61	12–4 (2–3)	27 – Gillespie	10 – Reese	4 – Gillespie	Xfinity Center (15,172); College Park, MD
January 13, 2025; 6:30 p.m., BTN		Minnesota	W 77–71	13–4 (3–3)	27 – Queen	8 – Reese	7 – Gillespie	Xfinity Center (10,271); College Park, MD
January 16, 2025; 9:00 p.m., BTN		at Northwestern	L 74–76 ^{OT}	13–5 (3–4)	23 – Reese	14 – Queen	4 – Gillespie	Welsh–Ryan Arena (5,871); Evanston, IL
January 19, 2025; 12:00 p.m., BTN		Nebraska	W 69–66	14–5 (4–4)	22 – Gillespie	10 – Reese	5 – Gillespie	Xfinity Center (11,069); College Park, MD
January 23, 2025; 9:00 p.m., FS1		at No. 17 Illinois	W 91–70	15–5 (5–4)	27 – Reese	17 – Reese	8 – Gillespie	State Farm Center (15,544); Champaign, IL
January 26, 2025; 12:00 p.m., CBS		at Indiana	W 79–78	16–5 (6–4)	23 – Rice	11 – Queen	9 – Gillespie	Simon Skjodt Assembly Hall (17,222); Bloomington, IN
January 29, 2025; 7:00 p.m., BTN		No. 17 Wisconsin	W 76–68	17–5 (7–4)	16 – Tied	12 – Queen	5 – Gillespie	Xfinity Center (17,950); College Park, MD
February 6, 2025; 7:00 p.m., FS1	No. 18	at Ohio State	L 70–73	17–6 (7–5)	24 – Reese	13 – Reese	4 – Gillespie	Value City Arena (10,155); Columbus, OH
February 9, 2025; 12:00 p.m., BTN	No. 18	Rutgers	W 90–81	18–6 (8–5)	29 – Queen	15 – Queen	5 – Queen	Xfinity Center (17,069); College Park, MD
February 13, 2025; 8:30 p.m., BTN	No. 25	at Nebraska	W 83–75	19–6 (9–5)	24 – Queen	12 – Reese	7 – Gillespie	Pinnacle Bank Arena (14,785); Lincoln, NE
February 16, 2025; 5:00 p.m., FS1	No. 25	Iowa	W 101–75	20–6 (10–5)	26 – Gillespie	13 – Queen	7 – Gillespie	Xfinity Center (15,681); College Park, MD
February 20, 2025; 8:30 p.m., FS1	No. 20	USC	W 88–71	21–6 (11–5)	22 – Rice	17 – Queen	4 – Gillespie	Xfinity Center (14,662); College Park, MD
February 26, 2025; 6:30 p.m., BTN	No. 16	No. 8 Michigan State	L 55–58	21–7 (11–6)	20 – Rice	10 – Queen	3 – Gillespie	Xfinity Center (17,950); College Park, MD
March 1, 2025; 12:00 p.m., BTN	No. 16	at Penn State	W 68–64	22–7 (12–6)	23 – Queen	15 – Reese	7 – Gillespie	Bryce Jordan Center (10,298); State College, PA
March 5, 2025; 6:30 p.m., BTN	No. 13	at No. 17 Michigan	W 71–65	23–7 (13–6)	19 – Rice	12 – Queen	5 – Gillespie	Crisler Center (11,477); Ann Arbor, MI
March 8, 2025; 3:00 p.m., Peacock	No. 13	Northwestern	W 74–61	24–7 (14–6)	19 – Reese	11 – Reese	4 – Rice	Xfinity Center (17,950); College Park, MD
Big Ten tournament
March 14, 2025; 6:30 p.m., BTN	(2) No. 11	vs. (7) No. 24 Illinois; Quarterfinals	W 88–65	25–7	26 – Rice	10 – Queen	9 – Gillespie	Gainbridge Fieldhouse (13,951); Indianapolis, IN
March 15, 2025; 3:30 p.m., CBS	(2) No. 11	vs. (3) No. 22 Michigan; Semifinals	L 80–81	25–8	31 – Queen	5 – Reese	9 – Gillespie	Gainbridge Fieldhouse; Indianapolis, IN
NCAA tournament
March 21, 2025*; 4:35 pm, TBS	(4 W) No. 11	vs. (13 W) Grand Canyon; First Round	W 81–49	26–8	18 – Reese	15 – Queen	3 – Tied	Climate Pledge Arena (17,024); Seattle, WA
March 23, 2025*; 7:10 pm, TBS	(4 W) No. 11	vs. (12 W) Colorado State; Second Round	W 72–71	27–8	17 – Queen	11 – Reese	7 – Gillespie	Climate Pledge Arena (17,102); Seattle, WA
March 27, 2025*; 7:39 pm, TBS/TruTV	(4 W) No. 11	vs. (1 W) No. 3 Florida; Sweet Sixteen	L 71–87	27–9	27 – Queen	8 – Reese	3 – Reese	Chase Center (16,417); San Francisco, CA
*Non-conference game. ^{#}Rankings from AP Poll. (#) Tournament seedings in parentheses. W=West. All times are in Eastern Time.

== Rankings ==
Ranking movements Legend: ██ Increase in ranking ██ Decrease in ranking — = Not ranked RV = Received votes
	Week																				
Poll	Pre	1	2	3	4	5	6	7	8	9	10	11	12	13	14	15	16	17	18	19	Final
AP	RV	RV	RV	RV	RV	RV	RV	RV	RV	RV	RV	RV	RV	18	25	20	16	13	11	11	9
Coaches	RV	RV	—	RV	RV	RV	RV	RV	24	RV	RV	RV	RV	24	25	20	15	14	11	12	9
