= Micah Peavy =

American basketball player (born 2001)

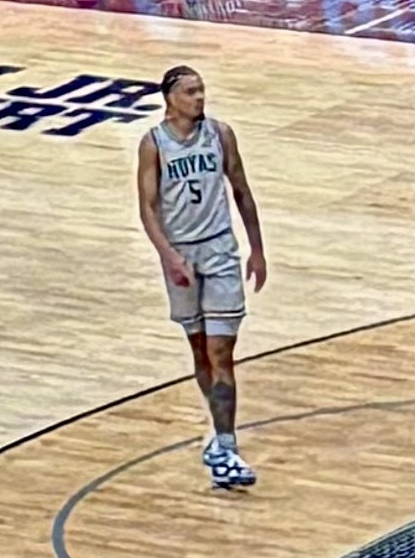
- Peavy with Georgetown in 2025

No. 16 – Oklahoma City Thunder
- Position: Shooting guard / small forward
- League: NBA

Personal information
- Born: July 16, 2001 (age 25) Cibolo, Texas, U.S.
- Listed height: 6 ft 6 in (1.98 m)
- Listed weight: 215 lb (98 kg)

Career information
- High school: Dekaney (Houston, Texas); Duncanville (Duncanville, Texas)
- College: Texas Tech (2020–2021); TCU (2021–2024); Georgetown (2024–2025)
- NBA draft: 2025: 2nd round, 40th overall pick
- Drafted by: Washington Wizards
- Playing career: 2025–present

Career history
- 2025–2026: New Orleans Pelicans
- 2026–present: Oklahoma City Thunder
- 2026–present: →Oklahoma City Blue

Career highlights
- First-team All-Big East (2025)
- Stats at NBA.com
- Stats at Basketball Reference

Micah James Peavy (born July 16, 2001) is an American professional basketball player for the Oklahoma City Thunder of the National Basketball Association (NBA), on a two-way contract with the Oklahoma City Blue of the NBA G League. He played college basketball for the Texas Tech Red Raiders, TCU Horned Frogs, and Georgetown Hoyas, and was drafted 40th overall by the Washington Wizards in the 2025 NBA draft.

== Early life and high school career ==
Peavy attended Dekaney High School in Houston, Texas for his freshman and sophomore years and Duncanville High School in Duncanville, Texas for his junior and senior years. As a senior, he averaged 19 points and 7.5 rebounds per game and was named the TABC Class 6A player of the year.

=== Recruiting ===
Coming out of high school, Peavy was rated as the 32nd overall player in the class of 2020 and committed to playing college basketball for Texas Tech over offers from Florida, TCU, and Texas.

College recruiting
Name	Hometown	School	Height	Weight	Commit date
Micah Peavy; SF	Cibolo, TX	Duncanville High School (TX)	6 ft 7 in (2.01 m)	172 lb (78 kg)	Nov 4, 2019
Micah Peavy; SF	Recruit ratings: Rivals: 247Sports: ESPN: (88)				
Overall recruit ranking: Rivals: 40 247Sports: 66 ESPN: 36
Note: In many cases, Scout, Rivals, 247Sports, On3, and ESPN may conflict in their listings of height and weight.; In these cases, the average was taken. ESPN grades are on a 100-point scale.; Sources: "Texas Tech 2020 Basketball Commitments". Rivals.; "2020 Texas Tech Red Raiders Recruiting Class". ESPN.; "2020 Team Ranking". Rivals.

== College career ==
=== Texas Tech ===
As a freshman in 2020–21, Peavy made 25 starts where he averaged 5.7 points per game for Texas Tech. After the season, he entered his name into the NCAA transfer portal.

=== TCU ===
Peavy transferred to play for the TCU Horned Frogs. In 2021–22, he appeared in 34 games with nine starts, where he averaged 6.1 points, four rebounds, 1.1 assists, and 0.6 steals per game. In 2022–23, Peavy played in 30 games with eight starts and averaged seven points, 3.1 rebounds, 1.2 assists, and one steal per game. In 2023–24, he averaged 10.9 points, 4.9 rebounds, and 2.6 assists per game. After the season, Peavy once again entered his name into the NCAA transfer portal.

=== Georgetown ===
Peavy transferred to play for the Georgetown Hoyas. On November 23, 2024, he totaled 24 points, six assists, and three steals in a win over Saint Francis. On December 18, Peavy tallied 20 points, eight rebounds, eight assists, seven steals and a block in a victory over Creighton. On February 8, 2025, he posted 22 points, seven rebounds, four assists, and three steals in a win over Seton Hall. On February 19, Peavy put up 30 points, seven rebounds, seven assists, and six steals in a win over Providence. On February 26, he notched 25 points, three assists and two rebounds versus UConn. At the conclusion of the season, Peavy was named to the All-Big East First Team. He was the first Hoya to be so honored since Jessie Govan following the 2018–2019 season.

== Professional career ==
=== New Orleans Pelicans (2025–2026) ===
Peavy was selected with the 40th pick in the 2025 NBA draft by the Washington Wizards and traded to the New Orleans Pelicans. The trade to Pelicans became official on July 6, 2025. The next day, Peavy signed his rookie contract. On April 7, 2026, Peavy recorded a career-high 20 points on 9-of-13 shooting during a 156–137 victory over the Utah Jazz.

=== Oklahoma City Thunder (2026–present) ===
On September 8, 2026, Peavy was traded to the Memphis Grizzlies alongside Jordan Hawkins in exchange for Taj Gibson and AJ Johnson. On October 19, the Grizzlies waived Peavy. On October 25, 2026, following the waiving of Otega Oweh, Peavy signed a standard two-way contract with the Oklahoma City Thunder.

== Career statistics ==
Legend
GP	Games played	GS	Games started	MPG	Minutes per game
FG%	Field goal percentage	3P%	3-point field goal percentage	FT%	Free throw percentage
RPG	Rebounds per game	APG	Assists per game	SPG	Steals per game
BPG	Blocks per game	PPG	Points per game	**Bold**	Career high

=== NBA ===
Year	Team	GP	GS	MPG	FG%	3P%	FT%	RPG	APG	SPG	BPG	PPG
2025–26	New Orleans	61	4	15.0	.385	.259	.759	1.9	1.0	.7	.1	4.3
Career		61	4	15.0	.385	.259	.759	1.9	1.0	.7	.1	4.3

=== College ===
Year	Team	GP	GS	MPG	FG%	3P%	FT%	RPG	APG	SPG	BPG	PPG
2020–21	Texas Tech	29	25	20.3	.459	.000	.474	3.1	1.4	.6	.2	5.7
2021–22	TCU	**34**	9	21.1	.444	.167	.571	4.0	1.1	.6	.5	6.1
2022–23	TCU	30	8	21.0	.377	.267	.644	3.1	1.2	1.0	**.7**	7.0
2023–24	TCU	**34**	**34**	29.3	.458	.310	.607	4.9	2.6	1.3	.2	10.9
2024–25	Georgetown	32	32	**37.0**	**.481**	**.400**	**.659**	**5.8**	**3.6**	**2.3**	.5	**17.2**
Career		159	108	25.9	.451	.323	.606	4.2	2.0	1.2	.4	9.5

== Personal life ==
Peavy has two step-brothers who also play basketball: Anthony Black, who plays in the NBA for the Orlando Magic, and Beckham Black, an elite high school basketball player noteworthy for earning the first merchandise deal from ESPN by a basketball player still in high school.
