= Cibolo, Texas =

- City
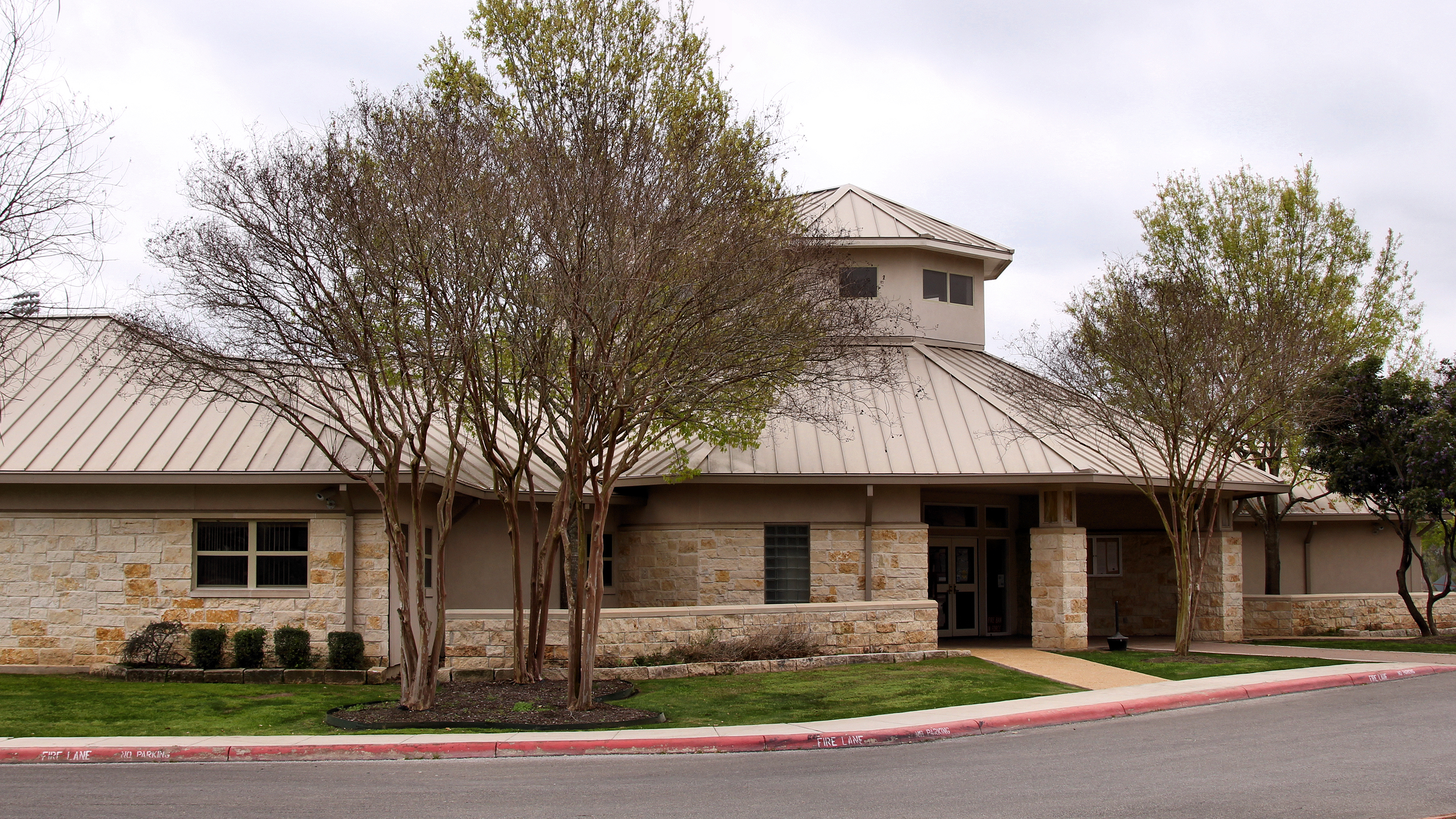
- Cibolo City Hall

- Location of Cibolo in Guadalupe County, Texas
- Coordinates: 29°33′40″N 98°12′06″W
- Country: United States
- State: Texas
- Counties: Guadalupe, Bexar

Government
  - Type: Council-Manager
  - Mayor: Kara Latimer

Area
  - Total: 20.94 sq mi (54.23 km^{2})
  - Land: 20.91 sq mi (54.16 km^{2})
  - Water: 0.027 sq mi (0.07 km^{2})
- Elevation: 692 ft (211 m)

Population (2020)
  - Total: 32,276
  - Density: 1,495.9/sq mi (577.58/km^{2})
- Time zone: UTC-6 (Central (CST))
  - Summer (DST): UTC-5 (CDT)
- ZIP codes: 78108
- Area codes: 210, 726
- FIPS code: 48-14920
- GNIS feature ID: 2409462
- Website: www.cibolotx.gov

Cibolo is a city in Guadalupe and Bexar counties in Texas, United States. It is part of the San Antonio–New Braunfels metropolitan statistical area. Cibolo voted to become an independent township on October 9, 1965. Cibolo is in a region settled primarily by German emigrants in the mid-1800s. As of the 2020 census, Cibolo had a population of 32,276, up from 15,349 at the 2010 census.

== History ==
Before the first European settlers arrived, the Comanche and several other Native American tribes lived in Cibolo. The name Cibolo means "buffalo". The community first established when the Southern Pacific Railroad cut through the area en route to major cities such as Houston and San Antonio. Over time, Cibolo developed into the suburb it is today.

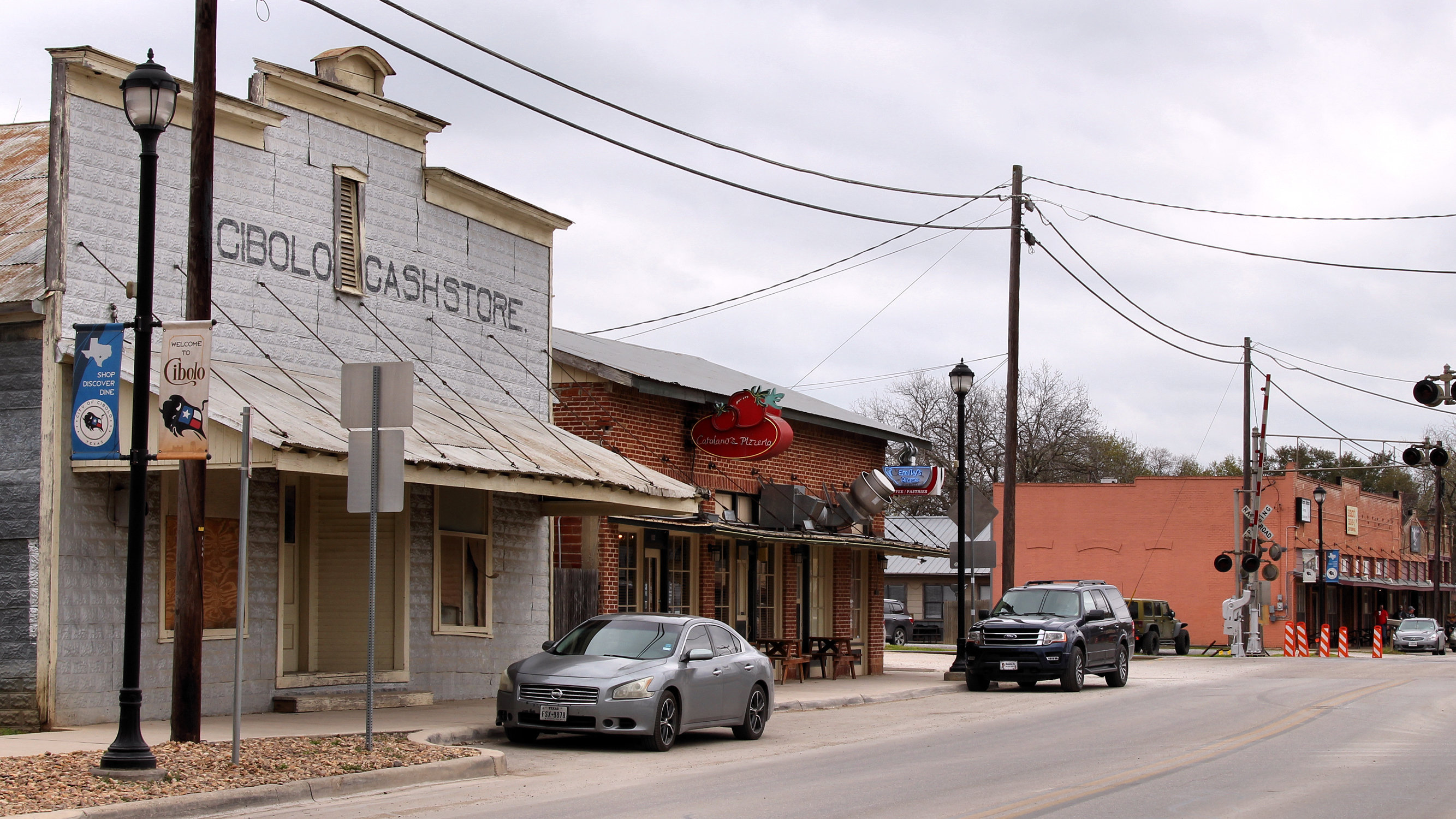
The old commercial district on Main Street.

In 1867, George Schlather built a store on land purchased by his father Jacob. In 1882, the Schlathers sold the store to Charles Fromme, who renamed it Fromme's Store. The community also became known by this name. In 1877, the Galveston, Harrisburg and San Antonio Railway station serving the area was called Cibolo Valley. In 1883, the US Post Office opened a branch in the town and called it Cibolo. By 1890, its population was 100 people.

Beginning in the 21st century, Cibolo has experienced high levels of growth, increasing 733% since 2000, when the population was 3,035 people. Between 2000 and 2010, the population increased 545% to 19,580 people. As Cibolo has grown, its share of the county population has also increased. In 2000, Cibolo accounted for only 3.4% of Guadalupe County's population, but between 2000 and 2010, Cibolo captured 38.9% of the county's growth, and its share of the population increased to 14.9%. Between 2010 and 2013, Cibolo acquired 22.3% of the growth in Guadalupe County, and today Cibolo accounts for 17% of the county's population.

== Geography ==
Cibolo is in western Guadalupe County, on the north side of Cibolo Creek. A small portion of the city, south of West Schaefer Road, crosses a bend of Cibolo Creek to enter Bexar County. Santa Clara and Marion border Cibolo to the east. New Berlin, Zuehl, and St. Hedwig border Cibolo to the south. Schertz borders Cibolo to the north and west. The city of New Braunfels is 14 miles (23 km) to the northeast, and downtown San Antonio is 21 miles (34 km) to the southwest.

According to the U.S. Census Bureau, Cibolo has a total area of 6.6 square miles (17.0 km^{2}), of which 0.004 square miles (0.01 km^{2}), or 0.07%, is covered by water.

== Demographics ==
=== Racial and ethnic composition ===
Cibolo city, Texas – Racial and ethnic composition Note: the US Census treats Hispanic/Latino as an ethnic category. This table excludes Latinos from the racial categories and assigns them to a separate category. Hispanics/Latinos may be of any race.
Race / Ethnicity (NH = Non-Hispanic)	Pop 2000	Pop 2010	Pop 2020	% 2000	% 2010	% 2020
White alone (NH)	2,171	8,666	14,030	71.53%	56.46%	43.47%
Black or African American alone (NH)	183	2,008	5,017	6.03%	13.08%	15.54%
Native American or Alaska Native alone (NH)	5	58	100	0.16%	0.38%	0.31%
Asian alone (NH)	38	441	1,030	1.25%	2.87%	3.19%
Native Hawaiian or Pacific Islander alone (NH)	3	42	124	0.10%	0.27%	0.38%
Other race alone (NH)	5	24	159	0.16%	0.16%	0.49%
Mixed race or Multiracial (NH)	53	484	1,909	1.75%	3.15%	5.91%
Hispanic or Latino (any race)	577	3,626	9,907	19.01%	23.62%	30.69%
Total	3,035	15,349	32,276	100.00%	100.00%	100.00%

=== 2020 census ===
As of the 2020 census, 32,276 people, 10,122 households, and 7,863 families were residing in the city. The median age was 35.9 years, 30.1% of residents were under the age of 18, and 9.0% were 65 or older. For every 100 females there were 94.3 males, and for every 100 females age 18 and over there were 90.6 males age 18 and over.

94.8% of residents lived in urban areas, while 5.2% lived in rural areas.

There were 10,122 households in Cibolo, of which 49.7% had children under the age of 18 living in them. Of all households, 67.4% were married-couple households, 10.1% were households with a male householder and no spouse or partner present, and 18.6% were households with a female householder and no spouse or partner present. About 13.3% of all households were made up of individuals and 4.9% had someone living alone who was 65 years of age or older.

There were 10,488 housing units, of which 3.5% were vacant. Among occupied housing units, 83.5% were owner-occupied and 16.5% were renter-occupied. The homeowner vacancy rate was 1.3% and the rental vacancy rate was 5.3%.

Racial composition as of the 2020 census
Race	Percent
White	51.8%
Black or African American	16.4%
American Indian and Alaska Native	0.7%
Asian	3.4%
Native Hawaiian and Other Pacific Islander	0.4%
Some other race	7.5%
Two or more races	19.8%
Hispanic or Latino (of any race)	30.7%

=== 2000 census ===
As of the census of 2000, 3,035 people, 1,092 households, and 848 families were residing in the city. The population density was 569.5 inhabitants per square mile (219.9/km^{2}). The 1,176 housing units had an average density of 220.7 units per square mile (85.2 units/km^{2}). The racial makeup of the city was 81.09% White, 6.16% African American, 0.26% Native American, 1.35% Asian, 8.21% from other races, and 2.93% from two or more races. Hispanics or Latinos of any race were 19.01% of the population.

Of the 1,092 households, 42.8% had children under 18 living with them, 65.3% were married couples living together, 8.9% had a female householder with no husband present, and 22.3% were not families. About 19.2% of all households were made up of individuals, and 6.0% had someone living alone who was 65 or older. The average household size was 2.78, and the average family size was 3.19.

In the city, the age distribution was 29.4% under 18, 7.1% from 18 to 24, 35.6% from 25 to 44, 21.8% from 45 to 64, and 6.2% who were 65 or older. The median age was 35 years. For every 100 females, there were 91.8 males. For every 100 females 18 and over, there were 90.3 males.

The median income for a household in the city was $53,780, and for a family was $65,545. Males had a median income of $42,557 versus $26,333 for females. The per capita income for the city was $23,988. About 4.8% of families and 6.1% of the population were below the poverty line, including 7.7% of those under 18 and 16.6% of those 65 or over.

By the mid-2010s, Cibolo was one of the fastest-growing small cities in the United States, experiencing a nearly 900% increase in population since 2000 and growing from 3,000 to the current estimate of about 30,000 residents. Actual figures are disputed, however, due to such a huge explosion of population in such a short period of time. This has caused problems in the city, due to such unanticipated growth making developments difficult to keep up with the rapidly increasing population, and a limited amount of land.

=== Population over time ===
- 1970 Census – 440
- 1980 Census – 549
- 1990 Census – 1,757
- 2000 Census – 3,035
- 2010 Census – 15,349
- 2020 Census – 32,276

== Government ==
The City of Cibolo is a "home rule" city. Cibolo voters adopted its initial "home rule" charter in 2005. Cibolo residents have voted to amend the charter twice since 2005:

- November 2013, voters approved 28 of 29 propositions presented.
- November 2018, voters approved 15 of 15 propositions presented.

The City of Cibolo is a council-manager type government. The city has a mayor and seven council members elected for three-year terms, with a two-term maximum. The seven council members currently are elected by and represent individual districts. Council members' duties include enacting local legislation (ordinances), adopting budgets, determining policies, and appointing the city manager, secretary, and attorney.

The City of Cibolo is also a member of the Alamo Area Council of Governments.

== Education ==
Public education is administered by the (SCUCISD). Schools located in Cibolo include:

- Byron P. Steele II High School
- J. Frank Dobie Junior High
- Barbara Jordan Intermediate
- Elaine S. Schlather Intermediate
- Cibolo Valley Elementary
- Maxine and Lutrell Watts Elementary
- O.G. Wiederstein Elementary

=== Charter schools ===
Legacy Traditional School is a charter school in Cibolo.

== Infrastructure ==
=== Major thoroughfares ===
- Interstate 35
- Interstate 10
- FM 78
- FM 1103

== Notable people ==
- Tommy Armstrong Jr., professional football player for the Sioux Falls Storm
- Malcolm Brown, professional football player
- Terence Steele, professional football player for the Dallas Cowboys
- Caden Sterns, professional football player for the Denver Broncos

== See also ==
- List of municipalities in Texas
