= 2026–27 Ohio State Buckeyes men's basketball team =

American college basketball season

2026–27 Ohio State Buckeyes men's basketball
- Conference: Big Ten Conference
- Record: 4–2 (0–0 Big Ten)
- Head coach: Jake Diebler (3rd season)
- Associate head coach: Joel Justus (3rd season)
- Assistant coaches: Dave Dickerson (3rd, 11th overall season); Jamall Walker (3rd season); Mike Wells (1st season); Luke Simons (3rd season); Brian Walsh (2nd season)
- Home arena: Schottenstein Center

2026–27 Big Ten Conference men's basketball standings
| | Conf. | | | | Overall |
| Team | W | | L | PCT | W | | L | PCT |
|---|---|---|---|---|---|---|---|---|
| Indiana | 0 | – | 0 | – | 6 | – | 0 | 1.000 |
| Minnesota | 0 | – | 0 | – | 6 | – | 0 | 1.000 |
| No. 24 Nebraska | 0 | – | 0 | – | 5 | – | 0 | 1.000 |
| No. 7 UCLA | 0 | – | 0 | – | 5 | – | 0 | 1.000 |
| No. 18т USC | 0 | – | 0 | – | 5 | – | 0 | 1.000 |
| Washington | 0 | – | 0 | – | 4 | – | 0 | 1.000 |
| No. 10 Illinois | 0 | – | 0 | – | 5 | – | 1 | .833 |
| Penn State | 0 | – | 0 | – | 5 | – | 1 | .833 |
| No. 2 Michigan State | 0 | – | 0 | – | 4 | – | 1 | .800 |
| No. 18т Michigan | 0 | – | 0 | – | 3 | – | 1 | .750 |
| Oregon | 0 | – | 0 | – | 3 | – | 1 | .750 |
| Ohio State | 0 | – | 0 | – | 4 | – | 2 | .667 |
| Purdue | 0 | – | 0 | – | 4 | – | 2 | .667 |
| Rutgers | 0 | – | 0 | – | 4 | – | 2 | .667 |
| Wisconsin | 0 | – | 0 | – | 4 | – | 2 | .667 |
| Iowa | 0 | – | 0 | – | 3 | – | 2 | .600 |
| Maryland | 0 | – | 0 | – | 3 | – | 2 | .600 |
| Northwestern | 0 | – | 0 | – | 3 | – | 3 | .500 |
† 2027 Big Ten tournament winner As of November 21, 2026; Rankings from AP poll

The 2026–27 Ohio State Buckeyes men's basketball team represents The Ohio State University during the 2026–27 NCAA Division I men's basketball season. They are led by third-year head coach Jake Diebler and play their home games at Schottenstein Center in Columbus, Ohio, as a member of the Big Ten Conference.

== Previous season ==
The Buckeyes finished up the 2025–26 season with a record of 21–13, along with 12–8 in Big Ten play to finish up in eighth place. As they were the No. 8 seed in the Big Ten tournament, they beat Iowa in the third round before losing to Michigan in the quarterfinals. The Buckeyes earned an at-large bid to the 2026 NCAA Division I men's basketball tournament as the No. 8 seed in the East region, where they lost to TCU, 66–64, in the first round.

== Offseason ==
=== Departures ===
Ohio State departures
| Name | Number | Pos. | Height | Weight | Year | Hometown | Reason for departure |
|---|---|---|---|---|---|---|---|
| Bruce Thornton | 2 | G | 6'2" | 215 | Senior | Fairburn, GA | Graduated, declared for the 2026 NBA draft, selected 31st by the New York Knicks (traded to the Houston Rockets) |
| Taison Chatman | 3 | G | 6'4" | 190 | RS Sophomore | Minneapolis, MN | Transferred to Utah |
| Gabe Cupps | 4 | G | 6'2" | 180 | RS Sophomore | Dayton, OH | Transferred to UIC |
| Puff Johnson | 6 | G/F | 6'8" | 200 | GS Senior | Moon Township, PA | Graduated, undrafted |
| Mathieu Grujicic | 9 | G | 6'7" | 210 | Freshman | Berlin, Germany | Transferred to Radford |
| Christoph Tilly | 13 | C | 7'0" | 240 | Senior | Berlin, Germany | Graduated, undrafted, signed with the Oklahoma City Thunder |
| Brandon Noel | 14 | F | 6'8" | 240 | GS Senior | Lucasville, OH | Graduated, undrafted |
| Colin White | 20 | F | 6'6" | 220 | Sophomore | Ottawa, OH | Transferred to Akron |
| Devin Royal | 21 | F | 6'6" | 230 | Junior | Pickerington, OH | Transferred to Villanova |

=== Incoming transfers ===
Ohio State incoming transfers
| Name | Number | Pos. | Height | Weight | Year | Hometown | Previous school |
|---|---|---|---|---|---|---|---|
| Curtis Givens III | 2 | G | 6'3" | 190 | Junior | Memphis, TN | Memphis |
| Jimmie Williams | 3 | G | 6'4" | 210 | RS Senior | Solon, OH | Duquesne |
| Andrija Jelavic | 4 | F | 6'11" | 240 | Junior | Zagreb, Croatia | Kentucky |
| Justin Pippen | 10 | G | 6'4" | 190 | Junior | Los Angeles, CA | California |

=== 2026 recruiting class ===
College recruiting
| Name | Hometown | School | Height | Weight | Commit date |
|---|---|---|---|---|---|
| Alex Smith; PF | Columbus, Ohio | Upper Arlington High School | 6 ft 9 in (2.06 m) | 195 lb (88 kg) | Sep 2, 2024 |
| Alex Smith; PF | Recruit ratings: Rivals: 247Sports: ESPN: (81) | | | | |
| Anthony Thompson; SF | Lebanon, Ohio | Western Reserve Academy | 6 ft 8 in (2.03 m) | 205 lb (93 kg) | Oct 21, 2025 |
| Anthony Thompson; SF | Recruit ratings: Rivals: 247Sports: ESPN: (92) | | | | |
| LJ Smith; CG | Lincolnton, North Carolina | Oak Hill Academy | 6 ft 4 in (1.93 m) | 180 lb (82 kg) | Nov 20, 2025 |
| LJ Smith; CG | Recruit ratings: 247Sports: ESPN: (89) | | | | |
| Vuk Lazarevic; C | Belgrade, Serbia | Wasatch Academy | 7 ft 1 in (2.16 m) | 200 lb (91 kg) | May 4, 2026 |
| Vuk Lazarevic; C | Recruit ratings: 247Sports: (NR) | | | | |
Overall recruit ranking: Rivals: 5 247Sports: 23 ESPN: —
Note: In many cases, Scout, Rivals, 247Sports, On3, and ESPN may conflict in their listings of height and weight.; In these cases, the average was taken. ESPN grades are on a 100-point scale.; Sources: "Ohio State 2026 Basketball Commitments". Rivals.; "2026 Ohio State Buckeyes Recruiting Class". ESPN.; "2026 Team Ranking". Rivals.

== Roster ==
2026–27 Ohio State Buckeyes men's basketball team
Players
Coaches

| Pos. | # | Name | Height | Weight | Year | Previous school | Hometown |
|---|---|---|---|---|---|---|---|
| G | 0 | John Mobley Jr. | 6 ft 2 in (1.88 m) | 190 lb (86 kg) | Jr | Wasatch Academy | Reynoldsburg, OH |
| F | 1 | Amare Bynum | 6 ft 8 in (2.03 m) | 245 lb (111 kg) | So | Link Academy | Omaha, NE |
| G | 2 | Curtis Givens III | 6 ft 3 in (1.91 m) | 190 lb (86 kg) | Jr | Memphis | Memphis, TN |
| G | 3 | Jimmie Williams | 6 ft 4 in (1.93 m) | 210 lb (95 kg) | RS Sr | Duquesne | Solon, OH |
| F | 4 | Andrija Jelavic | 6 ft 11 in (2.11 m) | 240 lb (109 kg) | Jr | Kentucky | Zagreb, Croatia |
| F | 6 | Anthony Thompson | 6 ft 9 in (2.06 m) | 215 lb (98 kg) | Fr | Western Reserve Academy | Lebanon, OH |
| C | 7 | Ivan Njegovan | 7 ft 2 in (2.18 m) | 260 lb (118 kg) | Jr | Gimnazija Vladimira-Nazora | Otočac, Croatia |
| G | 8 | Myles Herro | 6 ft 2 in (1.88 m) | 175 lb (79 kg) | So | Whitnall HS | Milwaukee, WI |
| F | 9 | Alex Smith | 6 ft 9 in (2.06 m) | 215 lb (98 kg) | Fr | Prolific Prep | Upper Arlington, OH |
| G | 10 | Justin Pippen | 6 ft 4 in (1.93 m) | 190 lb (86 kg) | Jr | California | Los Angeles, CA |
| G | 14 | LJ Smith | 6 ft 4 in (1.93 m) | 180 lb (82 kg) | Fr | Oak Hill Academy | Lincolnton, NC |
| F | 17 | Josh Ojianwuna | 6 ft 10 in (2.08 m) | 270 lb (122 kg) | Sr | Baylor | Asaba, Nigeria |
| F | 23 | Lee Aaliya | 6 ft 9 in (2.06 m) | 235 lb (107 kg) | | UCAM Murcia | La Plata, Argentina |
| G | 55 | Braylen Nash (W) | 6 ft 3 in (1.91 m) | 185 lb (84 kg) | Jr | New Albany HS | New Albany, OH |
| F | 88 | Vuk Lazarevic | 7 ft 1 in (2.16 m) | 230 lb (104 kg) | Fr | Wasatch Academy | Belgrade, Serbia |

Head coach

- Jake Diebler (Valparaiso)

Assistant coach(es)

- Jamall Walker (Saint Louis)
- Dave Dickerson (Maryland)
- Mike Wells (Mount Vernon Nazarene)
- Brian Walsh (Akron)
- Luke Simons (Purdue)

Legend

- (C) Team captain
- (S) Suspended
- (I) Ineligible
- (W) Walk-on
- Injured
- Current redshirt

Roster
Last update: October 13, 2026

== Schedule and results ==
| Date time, TV | Rank^{#} | Opponent^{#} | Result | Record | High points | High rebounds | High assists | Site (attendance) city, state |
Exhibition
| October 7, 2026*; 3:00 p.m. | | vs. Cincinnati; Exhibition | L 68–79 | – | 15 – Mobley Jr. | 7 – Bynum | 4 – Mobley Jr. | Lindner Family Tennis Center (11,017); Mason, OH |
| October 25, 2026*; 2:00 p.m., B1G+ | | Butler; Exhibition | W 82–73 | – | 23 – Bynum | 6 – Bynum | 3 – Tied | Schottenstein Center (6,996); Columbus, OH |
Regular season
| November 2, 2026*; 9:00 p.m., FS1 | | vs. No. 25 BYU; The Bad Boy Mowers Series | L 83–94 | 0–1 | 20 – Bynum | 9 – Jelavic | 7 – Mobley Jr. | Delta Center (10,422); Salt Lake City, UT |
| November 6, 2026*; 6:30 p.m., B1G+ | | Youngstown State | W 89–65 | 1–1 | 25 – Mobley Jr. | 9 – Jelavic | 4 – Mobley Jr. | Schottenstein Center (10,678); Columbus, OH |
| November 9, 2026*; 6:00 p.m., BTN | | Marshall | W 84–74 | 2–1 | 19 – Mobley Jr. | 6 – Tied | 4 – Mobley Jr. | Schottenstein Center (7,984); Columbus, OH |
| November 13, 2026*; 7:30 p.m., TNT/TruTV | | at No. 4 UConn | L 68–84 | 2–2 | 17 – Williams | 5 – Bynum | 4 – Mobley Jr. | PeoplesBank Arena (15,495); Hartford, CT |
| November 16, 2026*; 6:30 p.m., B1G+ | | Prairie View A&M | W 86–59 | 3–2 | 14 – Pippen | 8 – Jelavic | 5 – Mobley Jr. | Schottenstein Center (8,305); Columbus, OH |
| November 19, 2026*; 7:00 p.m., BTN | | UMBC | W 101–62 | 4–2 | 17 – Pippen | 10 – Bynum | 7 – Pippen | Schottenstein Center (7,828); Columbus, OH |
| November 24, 2026*; 7:00 p.m., NBCSN/Peacock | | Vanderbilt | | | | | | Schottenstein Center; Columbus, OH |
| November 29, 2026*; 5:30 p.m., BTN | | Lipscomb | | | | | | Schottenstein Center; Columbus, OH |
| December 2, 2026; 8:30 p.m., BTN | | at Nebraska | | | | | | Pinnacle Bank Arena; Lincoln, NE |
| December 6, 2026; 12:00 p.m., BTN | | Maryland | | | | | | Schottenstein Center; Columbus, OH |
| December 12, 2026*; 2:30 p.m., ACCN | | at Notre Dame | | | | | | Joyce Center; South Bend, IN |
| December 15, 2026*; 6:00 p.m., BTN | | Stony Brook | | | | | | Schottenstein Center; Columbus, OH |
| December 19, 2026*; 12:00 p.m., CBS | | vs. Kansas; CBS Sports Classic | | | | | | Madison Square Garden; New York, NY |
| December 22, 2026*; 4:00 p.m., BTN | | Mississippi Valley State | | | | | | Schottenstein Center; Columbus, OH |
| December 30, 2026; 4:00 p.m., BTN | | Oregon | | | | | | Schottenstein Center; Columbus, OH |
| January 2, 2027; 12:00 p.m., NBCSN/Peacock | | at Iowa | | | | | | Carver–Hawkeye Arena; Iowa City, IA |
| January 6, 2027; 6:30 p.m., BTN | | Northwestern | | | | | | Schottenstein Center; Columbus, OH |
| January 9, 2027; 4:00 p.m., CBS | | at Illinois | | | | | | State Farm Center; Champaign, IL |
| January 12, 2027; 8:00 p.m., NBCSN/Peacock | | at Purdue | | | | | | Mackey Arena; West Lafayette, IN |
| January 17, 2027; 12:00 p.m., BTN | | Penn State | | | | | | Schottenstein Center; Columbus, OH |
| January 23, 2027; 1:00 p.m., CBS | | Michigan State | | | | | | Schottenstein Center; Columbus, OH |
| January 26, 2027; 6:00 p.m., FS1 | | Iowa | | | | | | Schottenstein Center; Columbus, OH |
| January 30, 2027; TBA, FOX | | at Michigan; Rivalry | | | | | | Crisler Center; Ann Arbor, MI |
| February 6, 2027; 12:00 p.m., BTN | | at Penn State | | | | | | Bryce Jordan Center; State College, PA |
| February 9, 2027; 8:30 p.m., FS1 | | Wisconsin | | | | | | Schottenstein Center; Columbus, OH |
| February 14, 2027; 1:00 p.m., FS1 | | Washington | | | | | | Schottenstein Center; Columbus, OH |
| February 17, 2027; 11:00 p.m., BTN | | at UCLA | | | | | | Pauley Pavilion; Los Angeles, CA |
| February 20, 2027; 3:00 p.m., NBC | | at USC | | | | | | Galen Center; Los Angeles, CA |
| February 25, 2027; 6:30 p.m., FS1 | | Rutgers | | | | | | Schottenstein Center; Columbus, OH |
| February 28, 2027; 3:45 p.m., CBS | | at Indiana | | | | | | Simon Skjodt Assembly Hall; Bloomington |
| March 4, 2027; 8:30 p.m., FS1 | | at Minnesota | | | | | | The Barn; Minneapolis, MN |
| March 7, 2027; 2:15 p.m., CBS | | Michigan; Rivalry | | | | | | Schottenstein Center; Columbus, OH |
Big Ten tournament
| March 9–14, 2027; TBA, TBA | | vs. TBA; Big Ten tournament | | | | | | Gainbridge Fieldhouse; Indianapolis, IN |
*Non-conference game. ^{#}Rankings from AP Poll. (#) Tournament seedings in parentheses.

== Rankings ==
Ranking movements Legend: ██ Increase in ranking ██ Decrease in ranking — = Not ranked RV = Received votes
| | Week | | | | | | | | | | | | | | | | | | | | |
| Poll | Pre | 1 | 2 | 3 | 4 | 5 | 6 | 7 | 8 | 9 | 10 | 11 | 12 | 13 | 14 | 15 | 16 | 17 | 18 | 19 | Final |
|---|---|---|---|---|---|---|---|---|---|---|---|---|---|---|---|---|---|---|---|---|---|
| AP | RV | — | — | | | | | | | | | | | | | | | | | | |
| Coaches | RV | — | — | | | | | | | | | | | | | | | | | | |

== See also ==
2026-27 Ohio State Buckeyes women's basketball team
