= 2026–27 Iowa Hawkeyes men's basketball team =

American college basketball season

2026–27 Iowa Hawkeyes men's basketball
- Conference: Big Ten Conference
- Record: 2–2 (0–0 Big Ten)
- Head coach: Ben McCollum (2nd season)
- Assistant coaches: Josh Sash (2nd season); Luke Barnwell (2nd season); Connor Wheeler (2nd season); Bryston Williams (2nd season)
- Home arena: Carver–Hawkeye Arena

2026–27 Big Ten Conference men's basketball standings
	Conf.				Overall
Team	W		L	PCT	W		L	PCT
Indiana	0	–	0	–	6	–	0	1.000
Minnesota	0	–	0	–	6	–	0	1.000
No. 24 Nebraska	0	–	0	–	5	–	0	1.000
No. 7 UCLA	0	–	0	–	5	–	0	1.000
No. 18т USC	0	–	0	–	5	–	0	1.000
Washington	0	–	0	–	4	–	0	1.000
No. 10 Illinois	0	–	0	–	5	–	1	.833
Penn State	0	–	0	–	5	–	1	.833
No. 2 Michigan State	0	–	0	–	4	–	1	.800
No. 18т Michigan	0	–	0	–	3	–	1	.750
Oregon	0	–	0	–	3	–	1	.750
Ohio State	0	–	0	–	4	–	2	.667
Purdue	0	–	0	–	4	–	2	.667
Rutgers	0	–	0	–	4	–	2	.667
Wisconsin	0	–	0	–	4	–	2	.667
Iowa	0	–	0	–	3	–	2	.600
Maryland	0	–	0	–	3	–	2	.600
Northwestern	0	–	0	–	3	–	3	.500
† 2027 Big Ten tournament winner As of November 21, 2026; Rankings from AP poll

The 2026–27 Iowa Hawkeyes men's basketball team represents the University of Iowa during the 2026–27 NCAA Division I men's basketball season. They are led by second-year head coach Ben McCollum, and play their home games at Carver–Hawkeye Arena in Iowa City, Iowa, as a member of the Big Ten Conference.

== Previous season ==
The Hawkeyes finished the 2025–26 season 24–13, 10–10 in Big Ten play to finish in ninth place. In the Big Ten tournament, they defeated No. 17 seed Maryland in the second round before falling to No. 8 seed Ohio State 72–69 in the third round.

The Hawkeyes received an at-large bid to the NCAA tournament as the No. 9 seed in the South region. They defeated No. 8 seed Clemson 67–61 in the first round and upset No. 1 seed and defending National champion Florida 73–72 in the second round on a game-winning 3-pointer from Alvaro Folgueiras to reach their first Sweet Sixteen since 1999. In the Sweet Sixteen, the Hawkeyes defeated rival and No. 4 seed Nebraska 77–71 to reach their first Elite Eight since 1987. In the Elite Eight, despite jumping out to an early double-digit lead, the Hawkeyes eventually fell to No. 3 seed and rival Illinois 71–59, ending their season.

== Offseason ==
=== Departures ===
Iowa departures
Name	Number	Pos.	Height	Weight	Year	Hometown	Reason for departure
Tavion Banks	6	G/F	6'7"	215	Senior	Kansas City, Missouri	Graduated
Alvaro Folgueiras	7	F	6'10"	230	Junior	Málaga, Spain	Transferred to Louisville
Bennett Stirtz	14	G	6'4"	190	Senior	Liberty, Missouri	Graduated/2026 NBA Draft; Selected 16th overall by Memphis Grizzlies
Brendan Hausen	15	G	6'4"	220	Senior	Amarillo, Texas	Graduated

=== Incoming transfers ===
Iowa incoming transfers
Name	Number	Pos.	Height	Weight	Year	Hometown	Previous school
Ty'Reek Coleman	1	G	6'2"	175	Sophomore	Aurora, Illinois	Illinois State
Andrew McKeever	45	C	7'3"	285	Junior	Livermore, California	Saint Mary's

=== Recruiting classes ===
==== 2026 recruiting class ====
College recruiting
Name	Hometown	School	Height	Weight	Commit date
Ethan Harris; PF	Camas, Washington	Camas High School	6 ft 10 in (2.08 m)	200 lb (91 kg)	Nov 12, 2025
Ethan Harris; PF	Recruit ratings: Rivals: 247Sports: ESPN: (81)				
Jaiydn Coon; SG	Storm Lake, Iowa	Storm Lake High School	6 ft 6 in (1.98 m)	180 lb (82 kg)	May 1, 2026
Jaiydn Coon; SG	Recruit ratings: Rivals: 247Sports: ESPN: (75)				
Overall recruit ranking: Rivals: 45 247Sports: 65 ESPN: —
Note: In many cases, Scout, Rivals, 247Sports, On3, and ESPN may conflict in their listings of height and weight.; In these cases, the average was taken. ESPN grades are on a 100-point scale.; Sources: "Iowa 2026 Basketball Commitments". Rivals.; "2026 Iowa Hawkeyes Recruiting Class". ESPN.; "2026 Team Ranking". Rivals.

== Roster ==
2026–27 Iowa Hawkeyes men's basketball team
Players
Coaches

Pos.	#	Name	Height	Weight	Year	Previous school	Hometown
F	0	Ethan Harris	6 ft 8 in (2.03 m)	202 lb (92 kg)	Fr	Camas High School	Camas, Washington
G	1	Ty'Reek Coleman	6 ft 3 in (1.91 m)	190 lb (86 kg)	So	Illinois State	Aurora, Illinois
F	3	Cam Manyawu	6 ft 9 in (2.06 m)	250 lb (113 kg)	Sr	Drake	Kansas City, Missouri
G	5	Peyton McCollum (W)	6 ft 2 in (1.88 m)	180 lb (82 kg)	So	Waukee Northwest High School	Maryville, Missouri
G/F	6	Jaidyn Coon	6 ft 6 in (1.98 m)	220 lb (100 kg)	Fr	Storm Lake High School	Storm Lake, Iowa
F	8	Cooper Koch	6 ft 8 in (2.03 m)	220 lb (100 kg)	RS So	Metamora Township High School	Peoria, Illinois
G	10	Jacob Koch	6 ft 2 in (1.88 m)	185 lb (84 kg)	Jr	Iowa City West High School	Iowa City, Iowa
G	11	Kael Combs	6 ft 4 in (1.93 m)	205 lb (93 kg)	Sr	Drake	Nixa, Missouri
F	20	Trey Thompson	6 ft 8 in (2.03 m)	228 lb (103 kg)	So	Greeneville High School	Greeneville, Tennessee
G	23	Isaia Howard	6 ft 5 in (1.96 m)	216 lb (98 kg)	Jr	Drake	Plattsburg, Missouri
G/F	24	Tate Sage	6 ft 7 in (2.01 m)	210 lb (95 kg)	So	Weatherford High School	Weatherford, Oklahoma
C	27	Trevin Jirak	6 ft 11 in (2.11 m)	249 lb (113 kg)	So	Valley High School	West Des Moines, Iowa
F	44	Joey Matteoni	6 ft 9 in (2.06 m)	220 lb (100 kg)	RS So	Drake	Overland Park, Kansas
C	45	Andrew McKeever	7 ft 3 in (2.21 m)	280 lb (127 kg)	Jr	Saint Mary's	Livermore, California

Head coach

- Ben McCollum (Northwest Missouri State)

Assistant coach(es)

- Bryston Williams (Northwest Missouri State)
- Luke Barnwell (Newman)
- Josh Sash (William Penn)
- Connor Wheeler (SIU Edwardsville)

Legend

- (C) Team captain
- (S) Suspended
- (I) Ineligible
- (W) Walk-on
- Injured
- Current redshirt

Roster

== Schedule and results ==
Date time, TV	Rank^{#}	Opponent^{#}	Result	Record	High points	High rebounds	High assists	Site (attendance) city, state
Regular season
October 27, 2026*; 6:30 p.m., B1G+		Illinois–Springfield	W 88–64		13 – Combs	9 – Howard	7 – McKeever	Carver–Hawkeye Arena (4,718); Iowa City, IA
Regular season
November 3, 2026*; 7:00 p.m., BTN		Lipscomb	W 76–54	1–0	12 – Coon	7 – Jirak	4 – Tied	Carver–Hawkeye Arena (10,549); Iowa City, IA
November 6, 2026*; 7:30 p.m., BTN		Eastern Illinois	W 91–47	1–0	14 – McCollum	7 – Jirak	8 – Jirak	Carver–Hawkeye Arena (11,500); Iowa City, IA
November 10, 2026*; 6:00 p.m., FS1		vs. Virginia Tech	L 88–93 ^{OT}	2–1	26 – Koch	15 – Howard	3 – Combs	Tyson Events Center (6,086); Sioux City, IA
November 15, 2026*; 2:00 p.m., FS1		vs. Creighton	L 69–70	2–2	22 – Jirak	10 – Tied	4 – Jirak	Casey's Center (12,897); Des Moines, IA
November 20, 2026*; 6:30 p.m., TNT/TruTV		at Xavier						Cintas Center; Cincinnati, OH
November 24, 2026*; 6:00 p.m., B1G+		UMBC						Carver–Hawkeye Arena; Iowa City, IA
November 28, 2026*; 1:00 p.m., B1G+		Prairie View A&M						Carver–Hawkeye Arena; Iowa City, IA
December 1, 2026; 6:00 p.m., NBCSN/Peacock		at Purdue						Mackey Arena; West Lafayette, IN
December 7, 2026; 6:00 p.m., FS1		Indiana						Carver-Hawkeye Arena; Iowa City, IA
December 10, 2026*; 6:00 p.m., FS1		Iowa State; Rivalry / Iowa Corn Cy-Hawk Series						Carver–Hawkeye Arena; Iowa City, IA
December 13, 2026*; 5:00 p.m., BTN		Western Illinois						Carver–Hawkeye Arena; Iowa City, IA
December 17, 2026*; 8:00 p.m., BTN		Bethune–Cookman						Carver–Hawkeye Arena; Iowa City, IA
December 21, 2026*; 6:00 p.m., Peacock		vs. Alabama						Casey's Center; Des Moines, IA
December 29, 2026*; 7:30 p.m., BTN		South Dakota						Carver–Hawkeye Arena; Iowa City, IA
January 2, 2027; 11:00 a.m., NBCSN/Peacock		Ohio State						Carver–Hawkeye Arena; Iowa City, IA
January 6, 2027; 7:30 p.m., FS1		Wisconsin						Carver–Hawkeye Arena; Iowa City, IA
January 9, 2027; 5:00 p.m., FS1		Maryland						Carver–Hawkeye Arena; Iowa City, IA
January 12, 2027; 7:30 p.m., BTN		at Rutgers						Jersey Mike's Arena; Piscataway, NJ
January 16, 2027; 7:00 p.m., FS1 / FOX		at Nebraska						Pinnacle Bank Arena; Lincoln, NE
January 23, 2027; 3:00 p.m., BTN		Penn State						Carver–Hawkeye Arena; Iowa City, IA
January 26, 2027; 5:00 p.m., FS1		at Ohio State						Value City Arena; Columbus, OH
January 30, 2027; 4:00 p.m., NBCSN/Peacock		Nebraska						Carver–Hawkeye Arena; Iowa City, IA
February 3, 2027; 9:30 p.m., BTN		at USC						Galen Center; Los Angeles, CA
February 6, 2027; 5:00/7:00 p.m., FOX		at UCLA						Pauley Pavilion; Los Angeles, CA
February 10, 2027; 7:30 p.m., BTN		Oregon						Carver–Hawkeye Arena; Iowa City, IA
February 13, 2027; 1:00 p.m., FS1		at Northwestern						Welsh–Ryan Arena; Evanston, IL
February 16, 2027; 8:00 p.m., NBCSN/Peacock		Michigan State						Carver–Hawkeye Arena; Iowa City, IA
February 20, 2027; 12:00 p.m., CBS		at Michigan						Crisler Center; Ann Arbor, MI
February 24, 2027; 7:30 p.m., FS1		at Wisconsin						Kohl Center; Madison, WI
February 27, 2027; 1:00 p.m., BTN		Minnesota						Carver–Hawkeye Arena; Iowa City, IA
March 2, 2027; 6:00 p.m., BTN		Washington						Carver–Hawkeye Arena; Iowa City, IA
March 6, 2027; 7:00 p.m., FOX		at Illinois						State Farm Center; Champaign, IL
*Non-conference game. ^{#}Rankings from AP Poll. (#) Tournament seedings in parentheses. All times are in Central Time.
