= 2026–27 Big Ten Conference men's basketball season =

- League: NCAA Division I
- Sport: Basketball
- Teams: 18
- TV partner(s): Big Ten Network, Fox, FS1, CBS, Peacock, NBC, NBCSN

2026–27 NCAA Division I men's basketball season

Tournament
- Venue: Gainbridge Fieldhouse, Indianapolis, Indiana

Basketball seasons
- 2025–26 2027-2028

2026–27 Big Ten Conference men's basketball standings
	Conf.				Overall
Team	W		L	PCT	W		L	PCT
Indiana	0	–	0	–	5	–	0	1.000
Minnesota	0	–	0	–	5	–	0	1.000
No. 24 Nebraska	0	–	0	–	4	–	0	1.000
No. 7 UCLA	0	–	0	–	4	–	0	1.000
No. 18т USC	0	–	0	–	4	–	0	1.000
Wisconsin	0	–	0	–	4	–	0	1.000
Oregon	0	–	0	–	3	–	0	1.000
Washington	0	–	0	–	3	–	0	1.000
No. 10 Illinois	0	–	0	–	4	–	1	.800
No. 2 Michigan State	0	–	0	–	4	–	1	.800
Penn State	0	–	0	–	4	–	1	.800
No. 18т Michigan	0	–	0	–	3	–	1	.750
Rutgers	0	–	0	–	3	–	1	.750
Northwestern	0	–	0	–	3	–	2	.600
Ohio State	0	–	0	–	3	–	2	.600
Purdue	0	–	0	–	3	–	2	.600
Iowa	0	–	0	–	2	–	2	.500
Maryland	0	–	0	–	2	–	2	.500
† 2027 Big Ten tournament winner As of November 18, 2026; Rankings from AP poll

The 2026–27 Big Ten men's basketball season is for the Big Ten Conference in the 2026–27 NCAA Division I men's basketball season. The teams began practicing in October 2026 and season started the season on November 3, 2026. The regular season will conclude in March 2027.

Michigan is the defending regular season champions. The Wolverines are also the defending national champions.

== Head coaches ==
=== Coaching changes ===
==== Michigan ====
On June 23, 2026, Michigan head coach Dusty May left the school to become the head coach of the Dallas Mavericks. Assistant coach Mike Boynton was named the interim coach and, on July 2, signed a two-year contract to be the team's head coach.

==== Oregon ====
On October 7, 2026 Dana Altman announced his retirement after 17 seasons at Oregon. He finished his career at Oregon with a 382–182 record, ten NCAA tournaments and one final four appearance in 2017. Oregon assistant coach Tony Stubblefield was promoted to interim head coach.

=== Coaches ===
Team	Head coach	Previous job	Years at school	Overall record	Big Ten record	Big Ten titles	Big Ten tournament titles	NCAA Tournaments	NCAA Final Fours	NCAA Championships
Illinois	Brad Underwood	Oklahoma State	10	193–110 (.637)	107–71 (.601)	1	2	6	1	0
Indiana	Darian DeVries	West Virginia	2	18–14 (.563)	9–11 (.450)	0	0	0	0	0
Iowa	Ben McCollum	Drake	2	24–13 (.649)	10–10 (.500)	0	0	1	0	0
Maryland	Buzz Williams	Texas A&M	2	12–21 (.364)	4–16 (.200)	0	0	0	0	0
Michigan	Mike Boynton	Michigan (Asst.)	1	0–0 (–)	0–0 (–)	0	0	0	0	0
Michigan State	Tom Izzo	Michigan State (Asst.)	32	764–309 (.712)	375–177 (.679)	11	6	28	8	1
Minnesota	Niko Medved	Colorado State	2	15–18 (.455)	8–12 (.400)	0	0	0	0	0
Nebraska	Fred Hoiberg	Chicago Bulls	8	112–115 (.493)	52–87 (.374)	0	0	2	0	0
Northwestern	Chris Collins	Duke (Asst.)	14	209–209 (.500)	92–157 (.369)	0	0	3	0	0
Ohio State	Jake Diebler	Ohio State (Assoc.)	4	46–31 (.597)	26–20 (.565)	0	0	1	0	0
Oregon	Tony Stubblefield	Oregon (Asst.)	1	0–0 (–)	0–0 (–)	0	0	0	0	0
Penn State	Mike Rhoades	VCU	4	44–52 (.458)	18–42 (.300)	0	0	0	0	0
Purdue	Matt Painter	Purdue (Assoc.)	22	501–224 (.691)	251–136 (.649)	5	3	16	1	0
Rutgers	Steve Pikiell	Stony Brook	11	161–160 (.502)	77–119 (.393)	0	0	2	0	0
UCLA	Mick Cronin	Cincinnati	8	162–76 (.681)	26–14 (.650)	0	0	5	1	0
USC	Eric Musselman	Arkansas	3	35–32 (.522)	14–26 (.350)	0	0	0	0	0
Washington	Danny Sprinkle	Utah State	3	29–35 (.453)	11–29 (.275)	0	0	0	0	0
Wisconsin	Greg Gard	Wisconsin (Assoc.)	12	237–128 (.649)	131–83 (.612)	2	0	8	0	0

Notes:

- All records, appearances, titles, etc. are from time as head coach with current school only.
- Year at school includes 2026–27 season.
- Overall and Big Ten records are from time as head coach at current school only and are through the beginning of the season.

== Preseason ==
=== Preseason Big Ten poll ===
The Big Ten Media poll was released on October 5, 2026.

Rank	Team
1	Illinois
2	Michigan State
3	Michigan
4	UCLA
5	Nebraska
6	Purdue
7	USC
8	Ohio State
9	Indiana
10	Iowa
11	Wisconsin
12	Maryland
13	Minnesota
14	Oregon
15	Washington
16	Northwestern
17	Rutgers
18	Penn State

=== Preseason All-Big Ten ===
A select media panel named a preseason All-Big Ten team and player of the year.

Honor	Recipient
Preseason Player of the Year	Jeremy Fears Jr., Michigan State
Preseason All-Big Ten Team	Elliot Cadeau, Michigan
Preseason All-Big Ten Team	Jeremy Fears Jr., Michigna State
Preseason All-Big Ten Team	Trey McKenney, Michigan
Preseason All-Big Ten Team	David Mirkovic, Illinois
Preseason All-Big Ten Team	John Mobley Jr., Ohio State
Preseason All-Big Ten Team	Pharrell Payne, Maryland
Preseason All-Big Ten Team	Trent Perry, UCLA
Preseason All-Big Ten Team	Rodney Rice, USC
Preseason All-Big Ten Team	Andrej Stojakovic, Illinois
Preseason All-Big Ten Team	Nolan Winter, Wisconsin

=== Preseason national polls ===
	AP	Blue Ribbon Yearbook	CBS Sports	Coaches	ESPN	FOX Sports	Lindy's Sports	Sporting News	Sports Illustrated
Illinois	3	3	3	3	3	3	3	3	4
Indiana			26			25	27		25
Iowa							34		
Maryland							32		
Michigan	16	12	16	20	22	15	10	13	2
Michigan State	6	4	7	6	6	4	4	3	10
Minnesota									
Nebraska							36		20
Northwestern									
Ohio State		24					19		
Oregon									
Penn State									
Purdue			25	24			28		24
Rutgers									
UCLA	22		20		24	18	22		
USC	21	22	22	22	17	22	18	20	22
Washington									
Wisconsin									

== Regular season ==
=== Rankings ===
Legend
	Improvement in ranking
	Drop in ranking
	Not ranked previous week
RV	Received votes but were not ranked in Top 25 of poll
(Italics)	Number of first-place votes

		Pre/ Wk 1	Wk 2	Wk 3	Wk 4	Wk 5	Wk 6	Wk 7	Wk 8	Wk 9	Wk 10	Wk 11	Wk 12	Wk 13	Wk 14	Wk 15	Wk 16	Wk 17	Wk 18	Wk 19	Wk 20	Final
Illinois	AP	3 (2)	3	10																		
Illinois	C	3 (2)	3 (1)	8																		
Indiana	AP	RV	RV																			
Indiana	C	RV	RV																			
Iowa	AP	RV	RV																			
Iowa	C		23																			
Maryland	AP																					
Maryland	C	RV																				
Michigan	AP	16	20	18																		
Michigan	C	20	21	21																		
Michigan State	AP	6	5	2(3)																		
Michigan State	C	6	5	3 (2)																		
Minnesota	AP			RV																		
Minnesota	C																					
Nebraska	AP	RV	25	24																		
Nebraska	C	RV	24	20																		
Northwestern	AP																					
Northwestern	C																					
Ohio State	AP	RV																				
Ohio State	C	RV																				
Oregon	AP																					
Oregon	C																					
Penn State	AP																					
Penn State	C																					
Purdue	AP	RV																				
Purdue	C	24	RV																			
Rutgers	AP																					
Rutgers	C																					
UCLA	AP	22	9	7																		
UCLA	C	RV	15	10																		
USC	AP	21	21	18																		
USC	C	22	22	22																		
Washington	AP																					
Washington	C																					
Wisconsin	AP																					
Wisconsin	C	RV	RV																			

=== Players of the week ===
Throughout the conference regular season, the Big Ten offices will name one or two players of the week and one or two freshmen of the week each Monday.

Week	Date	Player of the week	School	Freshman of the week	School
1	November 9, 2026	Alijah Arenas	USC	Nikola Kusturica	UCLA
2	November 16, 2026	Jeremy Fears Jr.	Michigan State	Owen Foxwell	Wisconsin
3					
4					
5					
6					
7					
8					
9					
10					
11					
12					
13					
14					
15					
16					
17					
18					

=== Early season tournaments ===
Team	Tournament	Finish
Maryland	Players Era Festival (Players Era 16)	
Michigan	Players Era Festival (Players Era 16)	
Minnesota	Charleston Classic	
Northwestern	Charleston Classic	
Oregon	Players Era Festival (Players Era 16)	
Penn State	Battle 4 Atlantis (Bracket 1)	
Purdue	Fort Myers Tip-Off (Beach Division)	
Rutgers	Players Era Festival (Players Era 8)	
USC	Acrisure Series	
UCLA	Rady Children's Invitational	
Washington	Maui Invitational	
Wisconsin	Bahamas Championship	
