= 2026–27 Northwestern Wildcats men's basketball team =

American college basketball season

2026–27 Northwestern Wildcats men's basketball
- Conference: Big Ten Conference
- Record: 3–2 (0–0 Big Ten)
- Head coach: Chris Collins (14th season)
- Assistant coaches: Chris Lowery; Bryant McIntosh; Shane Southwell
- Home arena: Welsh–Ryan Arena

2026–27 Big Ten Conference men's basketball standings
	Conf.				Overall
Team	W		L	PCT	W		L	PCT
Indiana	0	–	0	–	5	–	0	1.000
Minnesota	0	–	0	–	5	–	0	1.000
No. 24 Nebraska	0	–	0	–	5	–	0	1.000
No. 7 UCLA	0	–	0	–	5	–	0	1.000
No. 18т USC	0	–	0	–	5	–	0	1.000
Washington	0	–	0	–	4	–	0	1.000
Penn State	0	–	0	–	5	–	1	.833
No. 10 Illinois	0	–	0	–	4	–	1	.800
No. 2 Michigan State	0	–	0	–	4	–	1	.800
Wisconsin	0	–	0	–	4	–	1	.800
No. 18т Michigan	0	–	0	–	3	–	1	.750
Oregon	0	–	0	–	3	–	1	.750
Ohio State	0	–	0	–	4	–	2	.667
Rutgers	0	–	0	–	4	–	2	.667
Northwestern	0	–	0	–	3	–	2	.600
Purdue	0	–	0	–	3	–	2	.600
Iowa	0	–	0	–	2	–	2	.500
Maryland	0	–	0	–	2	–	2	.500
† 2027 Big Ten tournament winner As of November 20, 2026; Rankings from AP poll

The 2026–27 Northwestern Wildcats men's basketball team represent Northwestern University in the 2026–27 NCAA Division I men's basketball season. They are led by 14th-year head coach Chris Collins. The Wildcats play their home games at Welsh–Ryan Arena in Evanston, Illinois as members of the Big Ten Conference.

== Previous season ==
The Wildcats finished the 2025–26 season 15–19, 5–15 in Big Ten play to finish in 15th place. As the No. 15 seed in the Big Ten tournament, they defeated Penn State in the first round and Indiana in the second round before losing to Purdue in the third round. Following the team's loss, they declined any postseason invitations.

== Offseason ==
=== Departures ===
Northwestern departures
Name	Number	Pos.	Height	Weight	Year	Hometown	Reason for departure
Tyler Kropp	1	F	6'9"	230	Freshman	Powell, OH	Transferred to Washington State
Nick Martinelli	2	F	6'7"	225	Senior	Glenview, IL	Graduated; drafted by the New York Knicks, traded to the Los Angeles Clippers
Jayden Reid	4	G	5'10"	160	Junior	Westbury, NY	Transferred to Memphis
Tre Singleton	8	F	6'8"	215	Freshman	Jeffersonville, IN	Transferred to Iowa State
Max Green	10	G	6'6"	190	Sophomore	La Grange, KY	Transferred to Charleston
Jordan Clayton	11	G	6'2"	185	Junior	Medford, MA	Transferred to UMass
Justin Mullins	20	G	6'6"	200	Senior	Oak Park, IL	Graduated
Arrinten Page	22	F	6'11"	246	Junior	Atlanta, GA	Transferred to Providence
K.J. Windham	24	G	6'3"	180	Freshman	Indianapolis, IN	Transferred to James Madison
Cade Bennerman	35	F	7'0"	205	Freshman	Nashville, TN	Transferred to North Carolina
Blake Smith	43	G	6'6"	190	Senior	Blue Bell, PA	Transferred to Oral Roberts
Gus Hurlburt	54	F	6'9"	210	(redshirt) Junior	Enderlin, ND	Left team

=== Incoming transfers ===
Northwestern incoming transfers
Name	Number	Pos.	Height	Weight	Year	Hometown	Previous school
Dylan Williams	2	G	5'11"	180	Graduate Student	Columbia, SC	Penn
LA Pratt	4	G	6'5"	190	Graduate Student	Columbus, OH	Northeastern
Aleksej Kostic	6	G	6'4"	240	Sophomore	Pfaffstätten, Austria	BYU
Colin Smith	7	F	6'9"	215	Junior	Dallas, TX	UCSB
Okku Federico	8	F	6'8"	215	Freshman	Helsinki, Finland	Drake
Ryan Soulis	12	F	6'10"	230	RS-Junior	Athens, Greece	Columbia
Luke McEldon	21	F	6'10"	255	RS-Junior	Essex, England	Mount St. Mary's
Jack Karasinski	32	F	6'7"	215	Graduate Student	Grand Rapids, MI	Bellarmine

=== 2026 recruiting class ===
College recruiting
Name	Hometown	School	Height	Weight	Commit date
			N/A	N/A	
Recruit ratings: No ratings found
Overall recruit ranking:
Note: In many cases, Scout, Rivals, 247Sports, On3, and ESPN may conflict in their listings of height and weight.; In these cases, the average was taken. ESPN grades are on a 100-point scale.; Sources: "2026 Northwestern Commits". Rivals.; "2026 Team Ranking". Rivals.

== Roster ==
2026–27 Northwestern Wildcats men's basketball team
Players
Coaches

Pos.	#	Name	Height	Weight	Year	Previous school	Hometown
G	2	Dylan Williams	5 ft 11 in (1.8 m)	180 lb (82 kg)	GS	Irmo High School/Penn	Columbia, South Carolina
G	3	Jake West	6 ft 3 in (1.91 m)	180 lb (82 kg)	So	William Penn Charter School	Malvern, Pennsylvania
G	4	LA Pratt	6 ft 5 in (1.96 m)	190 lb (86 kg)	GS	Lincoln Park Performing Arts Charter School/Northeastern	Columbus, Ohio
G	6	Aleksej Kostic	6 ft 4 in (1.93 m)	200 lb (91 kg)	So	Arkadia Traiskirchen/BYU	Pfaffstätten, Austria
F	7	Colin Smith	6 ft 9 in (2.06 m)	215 lb (98 kg)	Jr	AZ Compass Prep/UCSB	Dallas, Texas
F	8	Okku Federico	6 ft 8 in (2.03 m)	215 lb (98 kg)	Fr	Drive Basketball Academy/Drake	Helsinki, Finland
G	11	Jayden Hodge	6 ft 7 in (2.01 m)	190 lb (86 kg)	Fr	Montverde Academy	Houthalen-Helchteren, Belgium
F	12	Ryan Soulis	6 ft 10 in (2.08 m)	230 lb (104 kg)	RS Jr	Asheville School/Columbia	Athens, Greece
G	13	Phoenix Gill	6 ft 3 in (1.91 m)	185 lb (84 kg)	So	Saint Ignatius College Prep	Chicago, Illinois
C	18	Symon Ghai	7 ft 3 in (2.21 m)	210 lb (95 kg)	Fr	The Academy of Central Florida	Tiam, South Sudan
F	21	Luke McEldon	6 ft 10 in (2.08 m)	255 lb (116 kg)	RS Jr	Cushing Academy/Mount St. Mary's	Essex, England
F	32	Jack Karasinski	6 ft 7 in (2.01 m)	215 lb (98 kg)	GS	Catholic Central High School/Bellarmine	Grand Rapids, Michigan
F	42	Elijah Eschmeyer (W)	6 ft 7 in (2.01 m)	195 lb (88 kg)	Fr	Peak to Peak Charter School	Boulder, Colorado
G	44	Angelo Ciaravino	6 ft 6 in (1.98 m)	195 lb (88 kg)	So	Mount Carmel High School	Chicago, Illinois

Head coach

- Chris Collins (Duke)

Assistant coach(es)

- Chris Lowery (Southern Illinois)
- Bryant McIntosh (Northwestern)
- Shane Southwell (Kansas State)
- John Martinez (St. John's)
- Trevor Marcus (Duke)

Legend

- (C) Team captain
- (S) Suspended
- (I) Ineligible
- (W) Walk-on
- Injured
- Current redshirt

Roster

== Schedule and results ==
Date time, TV	Rank^{#}	Opponent^{#}	Result	Record	High points	High rebounds	High assists	Site (attendance) city, state
Exhibition
October 18, 2026*; 4:00 p.m.		at Illinois State	L 64–70	–	14 – West	6 – Tied	7 – West	CEFCU Arena (2,739); Normal, IL
October 25, 2026*; 12:30 p.m., B1G+		No. 18 Iowa State	L 59–94	–	21 – West	7 – Pratt	5 – Pratt	Welsh–Ryan Arena; Evanston, IL
Regular season
November 2, 2026*; 7:00 p.m., B1G+		Binghamton	W 86–60	1–0	24 – Karasinski	10 – Ciaravino	12 – West	Welsh–Ryan Arena (3,684); Evanston, IL
November 6, 2026*; 7:00 p.m., B1G+		Stony Brook	W 78–65	2–0	23 – West	7 – Tied	6 – West	Welsh–Ryan Arena (3,697); Evanston, IL
November 9, 2026*; 7:00 p.m., B1G+		Boston University	W 72–55	3–0	21 – West	6 – Ciaravino	8 – West	Welsh–Ryan Arena (3,927); Evanston, IL
November 13, 2026*; 8:00 p.m., BTN		DePaul	L 47–67	3–1	20 – West	7 – Ciaravino	2 – Pratt	Welsh–Ryan Arena (4,556); Evanston, IL
November 16, 2026*; 7:00 p.m., B1G+		Columbia	L 53–75	3–2	14 – Ciaravino	9 – Federiko	4 – West	Welsh–Ryan Arena (3,874); Evanston, IL
November 20, 2026*; 2:00 p.m., ESPN2		vs. Virginia Tech; Charleston Classic						TD Arena; Charleston, SC
November 22, 2026*; 12:00 p.m., ESPN2		vs. Dayton; Charleston Classic						TD Arena; Charleston, SC
November 27, 2026*; 7:00 p.m., BTN		Northeastern						Welsh–Ryan Arena; Evanston, IL
December 1, 2026; 8:00 p.m., NBCSN/Peacock		Wisconsin						Welsh–Ryan Arena; Evanston, IL
December 5, 2026*; 3:00 p.m., NBCSN/Peacock		vs. BYU						Delta Center; Salt Lake City, UT
December 12, 2026; 3:30 p.m., FOX		at Michigan						Crisler Center; Ann Arbor, MI
December 16, 2026*; 7:00 p.m., B1G+		Mercyhurst						Welsh–Ryan Arena; Evanston, IL
December 20, 2026*; 12:00 p.m., ESPN2/ESPNU		vs. Oklahoma State						BOK Center; Tulsa, OK
December 29, 2026*; 7:00 p.m., NBCSN/Peacock		Chicago State						Welsh–Ryan Arena; Evanston, IL
January 3, 2027; 6:30 p.m., BTN		Minnesota						Welsh–Ryan Arena; Evanston, IL
January 6, 2027; 5:30 p.m., BTN		at Ohio State						Value City Arena; Columbus, OH
January 10, 2027; 11:00 a.m., BTN		at Penn State						Bryce Jordan Center; State College, PA
January 13, 2027; 8:00 p.m., BTN		Illinois; Rivalry						Welsh–Ryan Arena; Evanston, IL
January 20, 2027; 9:30 p.m., BTN		at Washington						Hec Edmundson Pavilion; Seattle, WA
January 23, 2027; 6:00 p.m., NBCSN/Peacock		at Oregon						Matthew Knight Arena; Eugene, OR
January 27, 2027; 6:00 p.m., BTN		Indiana						Welsh–Ryan Arena; Evanston, IL
January 30, 2027; 1:00 p.m., BTN		USC						Welsh–Ryan Arena; Evanston, IL
February 6, 2027; 11:00 a.m., FS1		at Purdue						Mackey Arena; West Lafayette, IN
February 9, 2027; 6:00 p.m., BTN		at Indiana						Simon Skjodt Assembly Hall; Bloomington, IN
February 13, 2027; 1:00 p.m., FS1		Iowa						Welsh–Ryan Arena; Evanston, IL
February 16, 2027; 8:00 p.m., BTN		at Illinois; Rivalry						State Farm Center; Champaign, IL
February 21, 2027; 1:00 p.m., NBCSN/Peacock		at Minnesota						The Barn; Minneapolis, MN
February 24, 2027; 7:30 p.m., BTN		UCLA						Welsh–Ryan Arena; Evanston, IL
February 27, 2027; 2:00 p.m., FOX		Nebraska						Welsh–Ryan Arena; Evanston, IL
March 2, 2027; 7:30 p.m., FS1		Michigan State						Welsh–Ryan Arena; Evanston, IL
March 7, 2027; 12:00 p.m., BTN		at Maryland						Xfinity Center; College Park, MD
Big Ten tournament
March 9-14, 2027; TBA, TBA		vs.						Gainbridge Fieldhouse; Indianapolis, IN
*Non-conference game. ^{#}Rankings from AP Poll. (#) Tournament seedings in parentheses. All times are in Central Time.
