= 2026–27 UCLA Bruins men's basketball team =

American college basketball season

2026–27 UCLA Bruins men's basketball
- Conference: Big Ten Conference

Ranking
- Coaches: No. 10
- AP: No. 7
- Record: 5–0 (0–0 Big Ten)
- Head coach: Mick Cronin (8th season)
- Associate head coach: Darren Savino (8th season)
- Assistant coaches: Rod Palmer (8th season); Nate Georgeton (4th season); Nemanja Jovanovic (4th season); David Singleton (2nd season)
- Home arena: Pauley Pavilion (Capacity: 13,819)

2026–27 Big Ten Conference men's basketball standings
	Conf.				Overall
Team	W		L	PCT	W		L	PCT
Indiana	0	–	0	–	5	–	0	1.000
Minnesota	0	–	0	–	5	–	0	1.000
No. 24 Nebraska	0	–	0	–	5	–	0	1.000
No. 7 UCLA	0	–	0	–	5	–	0	1.000
No. 18т USC	0	–	0	–	4	–	0	1.000
Wisconsin	0	–	0	–	4	–	0	1.000
Oregon	0	–	0	–	3	–	0	1.000
Washington	0	–	0	–	3	–	0	1.000
No. 10 Illinois	0	–	0	–	4	–	1	.800
No. 2 Michigan State	0	–	0	–	4	–	1	.800
Penn State	0	–	0	–	4	–	1	.800
No. 18т Michigan	0	–	0	–	3	–	1	.750
Northwestern	0	–	0	–	3	–	2	.600
Ohio State	0	–	0	–	3	–	2	.600
Purdue	0	–	0	–	3	–	2	.600
Rutgers	0	–	0	–	3	–	2	.600
Iowa	0	–	0	–	2	–	2	.500
Maryland	0	–	0	–	2	–	2	.500
† 2027 Big Ten tournament winner As of November 19, 2026; Rankings from AP poll

The 2026–27 UCLA Bruins men's basketball team will represent the University of California, Los Angeles during the 2026–27 NCAA Division I men's basketball season. The Bruins, led by eighth-year head coach Mick Cronin, play their home games at Pauley Pavilion as members of the Big Ten Conference.

== Previous season ==
The Bruins finished the 2025–26 season 24–12, 13–7 in Big Ten play to finish a tie for seventh place. As the No. 6 seed in the Big Ten tournament, they defeated Rutgers and Michigan State before losing to Purdue in the semifinal. They received an at-large bid to the NCAA tournament as the No. 7 seed in the East region. There they defeated UCF before losing to UConn in the second round.

The Bruins finished with a 17–1 record at home, including wins over top-10 ranked Purdue, Illinois and Nebraska. In UCLA's opener in the Big Ten tournament, Donovan Dent had 12 points, 10 rebounds, and 12 assists in a 72–59 win over Rutgers. It was the first triple-double in the tournament's history. In the following game, the sixth-seeded Bruins won 88–84 in the quarterfinal over No. 8–ranked and third-seeded Michigan State, their first non-home win of the season against a ranked opponent.

== Offseason ==
=== Departures ===
UCLA Departures
Name	Num	Pos.	Height	Weight	Year	Hometown	Reason for Departure
Donovan Dent	2	G	6'2"	185	Senior	Riverside, CA	Transferred to LSU
Jamar Brown	4	G	6'5"	200	Senior	Chandler, AZ	Graduated
Christian Horry	7	G	6'2"	175	RS Freshman	La Cañada, CA	Entered transfer portal
Tyler Bilodeau	34	F	6'9"	230	Senior	Kennewick, WA	Drafted to Brooklyn Nets
Skyy Clark	55	G	6'3"	205	Senior	Los Angeles, CA	Entered transfer portal

Incoming transfers
Name	Num	Pos.	Height	Weight	Year	Hometown	Previous School
Azavier Robinson	23	PG	6'1"	180	Sophomore	Indianapolis, IN	Butler
Jaylen Petty	4	PG	6'0"	165	Sophomore	Seattle, WA	Texas Tech
Sergej Macura	12	SF	6'8"	220	Sophomore	Belgrade, Serbia	Mississippi State
Filip Jovic	38	PF	6'9"	225	Sophomore	Belgrade, Serbia	Auburn

=== 2026 recruiting class ===
College recruiting
Name	Hometown	School	Height	Weight	Commit date
Joe Philon; PF	Tampa, FL	Montverde Academy	6 ft 8 in (2.03 m)	180 lb (82 kg)	Mar 21, 2026
Joe Philon; PF	Recruit ratings: Rivals: 247Sports: ESPN: (87)				
Nikola Kusturica; SG	Novi Sad, Serbia	FC Barcelona Bàsquet B	6 ft 7 in (2.01 m)	180 lb (82 kg)	Jul 9, 2026
Nikola Kusturica; SG	Recruit ratings: Rivals: 247Sports:				
Javonte Floyd; C	Ellenwood, GA	Cedar Grove High School	6 ft 9 in (2.06 m)	220 lb (100 kg)	Dec 8, 2025
Javonte Floyd; C	Recruit ratings: Rivals: 247Sports: ESPN: (78)				
Gunars Grinvalds; SF	Jūrmala, Latvia	Real Madrid	6 ft 7 in (2.01 m)	N/A	Jun 5, 2026
Gunars Grinvalds; SF	Recruit ratings: No ratings found				
Overall recruit ranking:
Note: In many cases, Scout, Rivals, 247Sports, On3, and ESPN may conflict in their listings of height and weight.; In these cases, the average was taken. ESPN grades are on a 100-point scale.; Sources: "UCLA ESPN Recruiting". ESPN.; "2026 Team Ranking". Rivals.; "2026–27 UCLA Bruins men's basketball team". 247Sports.; "2026–27 UCLA Bruins men's basketball team". On3.

== Roster ==
2026–27 UCLA Bruins men's basketball team
Players
Coaches

Pos.	#	Name	Height	Weight	Year	Previous school	Hometown
G	0	Trent Perry	6 ft 4 in (1.93 m)	180 lb (82 kg)	Jr	Harvard-Westlake	West Covina, CA
F/C	1	Xavier Booker	6 ft 11 in (2.11 m)	245 lb (111 kg)	Sr	Michigan State	Indianapolis, IN
C	2	Javonte Floyd	6 ft 9 in (2.06 m)	220 lb (100 kg)	Fr	Cedar Grove High School	Ellenwood, GA
F	3	Eric Dailey Jr.	6 ft 8 in (2.03 m)	230 lb (104 kg)	Sr	Oklahoma State	Palmetto, FL
PG	4	Jaylen Petty	6 ft 0 in (1.83 m)	165 lb (75 kg)	So	Texas Tech	Seattle, WA
G/F	5	Brandon Williams	6 ft 7 in (2.01 m)	220 lb (100 kg)	Sr	Christ the King HS	Queens, NY
SF	6	Gunars Grinvalds	6 ft 7 in (2.01 m)	—	Fr	Real Madrid	Jūrmala, Latvia
PF	7	Joe Philon	6 ft 8 in (2.03 m)	180 lb (82 kg)	Fr	Montverde Academy	Tampa, FL
G	8	Eric Freeny	6 ft 4 in (1.93 m)	200 lb (91 kg)	Jr	Centennial HS	Corona, CA
G	10	Markell Alston	6 ft 1 in (1.85 m)	185 lb (84 kg)	So	Christ the King HS	Queensbridge, NY
SF	12	Sergej Macura	6 ft 8 in (2.03 m)	220 lb (100 kg)	So	Mississippi State	Belgrade, Serbia
SG	17	Nikola Kusturica	6 ft 7 in (2.01 m)	180 lb (82 kg)	Fr	FC Barcelona Bàsquet B	Novi Sad, Serbia
PG	23	Azavier Robinson	6 ft 1 in (1.85 m)	180 lb (82 kg)	So	Butler	Indianapolis, IN
PF	38	Filip Jović	6 ft 9 in (2.06 m)	225 lb (102 kg)	So	Auburn	Belgrade, Serbia

Head coach

- Mick Cronin (Cincinnati)

Assistant coach(es)

- Darren Savino (New Jersey City)
- Rod Palmer (UC Irvine)
- Nate Georgeton (Cincinnati)
- Nemanja Jovanovic (Belgrade)
- David Singleton (UCLA)

Legend

- (C) Team captain
- (S) Suspended
- (I) Ineligible
- (W) Walk-on
- Injured
- Current redshirt

Roster

== Schedule and results ==
Date time, TV	Rank^{#}	Opponent^{#}	Result	Record	High points	High rebounds	High assists	Site (attendance) city, state
Exhibition
October 21, 2026*; 7:00 p.m., B1G+	No. 22	California Baptist	W 100–53	–	25 – Dailey Jr.	9 – Booker	6 – Kusturica	Pauley Pavilion (1,518); Los Angeles, California
October 27, 2026*; 7:00 p.m., B1G+	No. 22	San Diego	W 82–50	–	17 – Perry	8 – Philon III	7 – Perry	Pauley Pavilion (1,910); Los Angeles, California
Regular season
November 2, 2026*; 7:00 p.m., TNT/TruTV	No. 22	vs. No. 5 Arizona; Rivalry/Hall of Fame Series − Las Vegas	W 84–75	1–0	21 – Perry	8 – Dailey Jr.	7 – Petty	T-Mobile Arena (10,777); Las Vegas, Nevada
November 6, 2026*; 7:30 p.m., BTN	No. 22	North Florida	W 114–63	2–0	29 – Kusturica	9 – Dailey Jr.	6 – Perry	Pauley Pavilion (4,684); Los Angeles, California
November 11, 2026*; 6:00 p.m., NBCSN/Peacock	No. 9	Arkansas–Pine Bluff	W 106–37	3–0	17 – Kusturica	6 – Tied	11 – Perry	Pauley Pavilion (3,312); Los Angeles, California
November 16, 2026*; 7:00 p.m., BTN	No. 7	Long Beach State	W 105–66	4–0	25 – Dailey Jr.	8 – Kusturica	5 – Williams	Pauley Pavilion (3,729); Los Angeles, California
November 18, 2026*; 7:30 p.m., BTN	No. 7	Cal State Fullerton	W 75–71	5–0	27 – Perry	8 – Petty	6 – Perry	Pauley Pavilion (3,353); Los Angeles, California
November 22, 2026*; 4:00 p.m., B1G+	No. 7	Delaware						Pauley Pavilion; Los Angeles, California
November 26, 2026*; 2:00 p.m., FS1		vs. Saint Mary's; Rady Children's Invitational Semifinals						Jenny Craig Pavilion; San Diego, California
November 27, 2026*; 11:30 a.m. or 2:00 p.m., FOX		vs. Georgetown or Texas; Rady Children's Invitational 3rd Place or Championship Game						Jenny Craig Pavilion; San Diego, California
December 1, 2026; 7:00 p.m., FS1		Oregon						Pauley Pavilion; Los Angeles, California
December 5, 2026*; 8:30 p.m., FOX		vs. Gonzaga; Acura West Coast Hoops Showdown						Honda Center; Anaheim, California
December 13, 2026; 5:00 p.m., BTN		at Washington						Alaska Airlines Arena; Seattle, Washington
December 19, 2026*; 1:30 p.m., NBCSN/Peacock		Quinnipiac						Pauley Pavilion; Los Angeles, California
December 22, 2026*; 4:00 p.m., B1G+		UC Riverside						Pauley Pavilion; Los Angeles, California
December 29, 2026*; 7:00 p.m., FS1		San Diego State						Pauley Pavilion; Los Angeles, California
January 2, 2027; 3:00 p.m., FS1		at Maryland						XFINITY Center; College Park, Maryland
January 5, 2027; 3:00 p.m., BTN		at Rutgers						Jersey Mike's Arena; Piscataway, New Jersey
January 9, 2027; 5:00 p.m., FOX		Michigan State						Pauley Pavilion; Los Angeles, California
January 16, 2027; 12:00 p.m., BTN		Washington						Pauley Pavilion; Los Angeles, California
January 19, 2027; 7:30 p.m., FS1		Wisconsin						Pauley Pavilion; Los Angeles, California
January 22, 2027; 6:00 p.m., FS1		at Nebraska						Pinnacle Bank Arena; Lincoln, Nebraska
January 26, 2027; 7:00 p.m., NBCSN/Peacock		Michigan						Pauley Pavilion; Los Angeles, California
January 30, 2027; 9:00 a.m., CBS		at Indiana						Simon Skjodt Assembly Hall; Bloomington, Indiana
February 2, 2027; 6:00 p.m., NBCSN/Peacock		at Illinois						State Farm Center; Champaign, Illinois
February 6, 2027; 3:00 p.m./5:00 p.m., FOX		Iowa						Pauley Pavilion; Los Angeles, California
February 9, 2027; 7:00 p.m., Peacock		Minnesota						Pauley Pavilion; Los Angeles, California
February 13, 2027; 2:30 p.m., FOX		at USC; Rivalry						Galen Center; Los Angeles, California
February 17, 2027; 8:00 p.m., BTN		Ohio State						Pauley Pavilion; Los Angeles, California
February 21, 2027; 10:00 a.m., CBS		at Purdue						Mackey Arena; West Lafayette, Indiana
February 24, 2027; 5:30 p.m., BTN		at Northwestern						Welsh-Ryan Arena; Evanston, Illinois
February 27, 2027; 7:30 p.m., BTN		Penn State						Pauley Pavilion; Los Angeles, California
March 3, 2027; 7:30 p.m., BTN		at Oregon						Matthew Knight Arena; Eugene, Oregon
March 6, 2027; 2:30 p.m., FOX		USC; Rivalry/Senior Day						Pauley Pavilion; Los Angeles, California
Big Ten tournament
March 9-14, 2027		vs. TBD; Big Ten Tournament						Gainbridge Fieldhouse; Indianapolis, Indiana
*Non-conference game. ^{#}Rankings from AP poll. (#) Tournament seedings in parentheses. All times are in Pacific Time.

== Rankings ==
Ranking movements Legend: ██ Increase in ranking ██ Decrease in ranking RV = Received votes
	Week																				
Poll	Pre	1	2	3	4	5	6	7	8	9	10	11	12	13	14	15	16	17	18	19	Final
AP	22	9	7																		
Coaches	RV	15	10																		

== Game summaries ==
=== Regular season ===
==== vs Arizona (Hall of Fame Series – Las Vegas) ====
TNT/TruTV

November 2, 2026
7:00 p.m.

Box Score

No. 22 UCLA Bruins 84, No. 5 Arizona Wildcats 75
Scoring by half: 43–29, 41– 47
Pts: Trent Perry, 21; Rebs: Eric Dailey, 8 Asts: Jaylen Petty, 7	Pts: Ivan Kharchenkov, 38; Rebs: Ivan Kharchenkov, 10; Asts: JJ Mandaquit, 6

T-Mobile Arena, Las Vegas, NV
Attendance: 10,777
Referees: Mike Reed, Greg Nixon, Steve Anderson

== Awards and honors ==
Recipient	Award (Big-Ten Conference)	Week #	Date awarded	Ref.
Nikola Kusturica	Freshman of the Week	1	November 9, 2026	
