= 2027 Big Ten men's basketball tournament =

American college basketball postseason tournament

- Classification: Division I
- Season: 2026–27
- Teams: 18
- Site: Gainbridge Fieldhouse; Indianapolis, Indiana
- Television: Peacock/NBCSN, BTN, CBS/Paramount+

2026–27 Big Ten Conference men's basketball standings
	Conf.				Overall
Team	W		L	PCT	W		L	PCT
Illinois	0	–	0	–	0	–	0	–
Indiana	0	–	0	–	0	–	0	–
Iowa	0	–	0	–	0	–	0	–
Maryland	0	–	0	–	0	–	0	–
Michigan	0	–	0	–	0	–	0	–
Michigan State	0	–	0	–	0	–	0	–
Minnesota	0	–	0	–	0	–	0	–
Nebraska	0	–	0	–	0	–	0	–
Northwestern	0	–	0	–	0	–	0	–
Ohio State	0	–	0	–	0	–	0	–
Oregon	0	–	0	–	0	–	0	–
Penn State	0	–	0	–	0	–	0	–
Purdue	0	–	0	–	0	–	0	–
Rutgers	0	–	0	–	0	–	0	–
UCLA	0	–	0	–	0	–	0	–
USC	0	–	0	–	0	–	0	–
Washington	0	–	0	–	0	–	0	–
Wisconsin	0	–	0	–	0	–	0	–
† 2027 Big Ten tournament winner As of April 1, 2026; Rankings from AP poll

The 2027 Big Ten men's basketball tournament (branded at the 2027 TIAA Big Ten Men's basketball Tournament for sponsorship reasons) will be a postseason men's basketball tournament for the Big Ten Conference in the 2026-27 NCAA Division I men's basketball season. The tournament will take place from March 9-14, 2027, at the Gainbridge Fieldhouse in Indianapolis, Indiana. The tournament winner will receive the conference's automatic bid into the NCAA Tournament.

== Seeds ==
Teams are seeded by conference record, with a tiebreaker system used to seed teams with identical conference records.

Seed	School	Conference records	Tiebreak 1
1	#‡		
2	‡		
3	‡		
4	‡		
5	†		
6	†		
7	†		
8	†		
9			
10			
11			
12			
13			
14			
15			
16			
17			
18			

Notes: # – Big Ten regular season champions, and tournament No. 1 seed
‡ – Received a triple-bye into the conference tournament quarterfinal round
† – Received a double-bye into the conference tournament third round
Overall records include all games played in the 2026 Big Ten tournament.

== Schedule ==
Session	Game	Time*	Matchup^{#}	Score	Television	Attendance
First round – Tuesday, March 9
1	1					
1	2					
Second round – Wednesday, March 10
2	3					
2	4					
3	5					
3	6					
Third round – Thursday, March 11
4	7					
4	8					
5	9					
5	10					
Quarterfinals – Friday, March 12
6	11					
6	12					
7	13					
7	14					
Semifinals – Saturday, March 13
8	15					
8	16					
Championship – Sunday, March 14
9	17					

*Game times in CDT. #Rankings denote tournament seeding.

== Bracket ==
First round Tuesday, March 10; Peacock/NBCSN
16
17
15
18

Second round Wednesday, March 11; Peacock/NBCSN/BTN
9
12
13
10
11
14

Third round Thursday, March 12; BTN
8
5
7
6

Quarterfinals; Friday, March 13; BTN
1
4
2
3

Semifinals; Saturday, March 14; CBS

Championship; Sunday, March 15; CBS

* denotes overtime period
