= 2026–27 Rutgers Scarlet Knights men's basketball team =

2026–27 Rutgers Scarlet Knights men's basketball
- Conference: Big Ten Conference
- Record: 3–2 ( Big Ten)
- Head coach: Steve Pikiell (11th season)
- Associate head coach: Brandin Knight
- Assistant coaches: T. J. Thompson; Marlon Williamson; Jay Young; Steve Hayn
- Home arena: Jersey Mike's Arena

2026–27 Big Ten Conference men's basketball standings
	Conf.				Overall
Team	W		L	PCT	W		L	PCT
Indiana	0	–	0	–	6	–	0	1.000
Minnesota	0	–	0	–	6	–	0	1.000
No. 24 Nebraska	0	–	0	–	5	–	0	1.000
No. 7 UCLA	0	–	0	–	5	–	0	1.000
No. 18т USC	0	–	0	–	5	–	0	1.000
Washington	0	–	0	–	4	–	0	1.000
No. 10 Illinois	0	–	0	–	5	–	1	.833
Penn State	0	–	0	–	5	–	1	.833
No. 2 Michigan State	0	–	0	–	4	–	1	.800
Oregon	0	–	0	–	3	–	1	.750
Ohio State	0	–	0	–	4	–	2	.667
Purdue	0	–	0	–	4	–	2	.667
Rutgers	0	–	0	–	4	–	2	.667
Wisconsin	0	–	0	–	4	–	2	.667
Iowa	0	–	0	–	3	–	2	.600
Maryland	0	–	0	–	3	–	2	.600
No. 18т Michigan	0	–	0	–	3	–	2	.600
Northwestern	0	–	0	–	3	–	3	.500
† 2027 Big Ten tournament winner As of November 22, 2026; Rankings from AP poll

The 2026–27 Rutgers Scarlet Knights men's basketball team represent Rutgers University–New Brunswick during the 2026–27 NCAA Division I men's basketball season. The Scarlet Knights are led by 11th-year head coach Steve Pikiell and play their home games at Jersey Mike's Arena in Piscataway, New Jersey as members of the Big Ten Conference.

== Previous season ==
The Scarlet Knights finished the 2025–26 season 14–20, 6–14 in Big Ten play to finish in 14th place. They lost to UCLA in the third round of the Big Ten tournament, following a win against Minnesota in the second round. They lost to Creighton in the quarterfinals of the 2026 College Basketball Crown.

== Offseason ==
=== Departures ===
Rutgers departures
Name	Number	Pos.	Height	Weight	Year	Hometown	Reason for departure
Bryce Dortch	4	F	6'9"	210	Sophomore	Somerville, MA	Transferred to Notre Dame
Dylan Grant	9	F	6'8"	220	Junior	Mississauga, Canada	Transferred to Charlotte
Chris Nwuli	11	F	6'8"	205	Sophomore	North Las Vegas, NV	Transferred to Seton Hall
Harun Zrno	13	G	6'7"	220	Freshman	Sarajevo	Transferred to Washington
Emmanuel Ogbole	21	C	6'10"	260	Senior	Aune-Adoka, Nigeria	Graduated, entered the transfer portal
Dorian Jones	22	G	6'4"	160	RS-Freshman	Cleveland, OH	Transferred to Kent State
Denis Bădălău	27	F	6'8"	200	Freshman	Giurgiu, Romania	Transferred to Towson
Baye Fall	32	C	6'11"	205	Junior	Guédiawaye, Senegal	Transferred to Fresno State

=== Incoming transfers ===
Rutgers incoming transfers
Name	Number	Pos	Height	Weight	Year	Hometown	Previous school	Years remaining	Date eligible
Darin Smith Jr.	4	G	6'7"	210	Junior	Springfield, MA	Central Connecticut	2	October 1, 2026
RaSheed Jones	7	G	6'6"	190	RS-Senior	Marion, IN	Coastal Carolina	0	October 1, 2026
Will Snydor	9	F	6'8"	210	Junior	Bronx, NY	Manhattan	2	October 1, 2026
Dorin Buca	22	C	7'2"	286	RS-Senior	Perugia, Italy	Kansas State	0	October 1, 2026
Christian Gurdak	32	C	6'10"	260	Sophomore	Charles Town, WV	Virginia Tech	3	October 1, 2026

== Roster ==
2026–27 Rutgers Scarlet Knights men's basketball team
Players
Coaches

Pos.	#	Name	Height	Weight	Year	Previous school	Hometown
G	0	Tariq Francis	6 ft 1 in (1.85 m)	180 lb (82 kg)	Sr	NJIT	Pittsburgh, PA
G	1	Jamichael Davis	6 ft 2 in (1.88 m)	180 lb (82 kg)	Sr	McEachern	Chattanooga, TN
G	2	Lino Mark	6 ft 2 in (1.88 m)	185 lb (84 kg)	So	Notre Dame	Los Angeles, CA
G	3	Kaden Powers	6 ft 4 in (1.93 m)	195 lb (88 kg)	So	Rainier Beach	Seattle, WA
G	4	Darin Smith Jr.	6 ft 7 in (2.01 m)	210 lb (95 kg)	Jr	Vermont Academy/Central Connecticut	Springfield, MA
G	5	Darren Buchanan Jr.	6 ft 7 in (2.01 m)	235 lb (107 kg)	RS Sr	George Washington / Virginia Tech	Washington, D.C.
G	6	Imahri Wooden	6 ft 5 in (1.96 m)	195 lb (88 kg)	Fr	Redemption Christian Academy	Troy, NY
G	7	RaSheed Jones	6 ft 6 in (1.98 m)	190 lb (86 kg)	RS Sr	Marion High School/Coastal Carolina	Marion, IN
F	9	Will Sydnor	6 ft 8 in (2.03 m)	210 lb (95 kg)	Jr	The Patrick School/Manhattan	Bronx, NY
C	15	Gevonte Ware	6 ft 9 in (2.06 m)	255 lb (116 kg)	So	1 of 1 Academy Center	Roosevelt, NY
C	22	Dorin Buca	7 ft 2 in (2.18 m)	286 lb (130 kg)	RS Sr	Akern Libertas Livorno/Kansas State	Perugia, Italy
F	23	Martin Tonejc	6 ft 7 in (2.01 m)	210 lb (95 kg)	Fr	Suas Ljubljana	Jesenice, Slovenia
G	24	Max Fradkin (W)	5 ft 11 in (1.8 m)	170 lb (77 kg)	Jr	The Taft School	Southbury, CT
F	27	Mervedi Miteo	6 ft 10 in (2.08 m)	265 lb (120 kg)	Fr	Gran Canaria	Kinshasa, Congo
C	32	Christian Gurdak	6 ft 10 in (2.08 m)	265 lb (120 kg)	So	Gonzaga College/Virginia Tech	Charles Town, WV
G	33	Diego Garavaglia	6 ft 7 in (2.01 m)	210 lb (95 kg)	Fr	Cloe Giani High School	Milan, Italy

Head coach

- Steve Pikiell (Connecticut)

Assistant coach(es)

- Brandin Knight (Pittsburgh)
- T. J. Thompson (George Washington)
- Marlon Williamson (Youngstown State)
- Jay Young (Marist)
- Steve Hayn (Stony Brook)

Legend

- (C) Team captain
- (S) Suspended
- (I) Ineligible
- (W) Walk-on
- Injured
- Current redshirt

Roster

== Schedule and results ==
Date time, TV	Rank^{#}	Opponent^{#}	Result	Record	High points	High rebounds	High assists	Site (attendance) city, state
Exhibition
October 11, 2026*; 1:00 p.m., B1G+		Villanova	L 75–77	–	20 – Smith Jr.	8 – Gurdak	5 – Mark	Jersey Mike's Arena (5,930); Piscataway, NJ
October 18, 2026*; 12:00 p.m., B1G+		St. John's	L 99–104 ^{4OT}	–	24 – Francis	15 – Gurdak	4 – Mark	Madison Square Garden (11,041); New York, NY
Regular season
November 6, 2026*; 7:00 p.m., B1G+		New Haven	W 81–54	1–0	14 – Francis	6 – Smith Jr.	3 – Tied	Jersey Mike's Arena (8,000); Piscataway, NJ
November 10, 2026*; 6:30 p.m., BTN		NJIT	W 101–64	2–0	17 – Tied	8 – Mark	6 – Francis	Jersey Mike's Arena (7,026); Piscataway, NJ
November 13, 2026*; 6:00 p.m., B1G+		Bryant	W 72–51	3–0	20 – Gurdak	14 – Gurdak	3 – Mark	Jersey Mike's Arena (7,932); Piscataway, NJ
November 17, 2026*; 2:00 p.m., ESPN		vs. No. 8 Houston; Players Era 8 First Round	L 73–85	3–1	22 – Mark	7 – Gurdak	3 – Mark	Michelob Ultra Arena (3,923); Las Vegas, NV
November 18, 2026*; 2:00 p.m., ESPN		vs. Notre Dame; Players Era 8 Consolation Game	L 100–110 ^{OT}	3–2	25 – Francis	10 – Gurdak	6 – Mark	Michelob Ultra Arena; Las Vegas, NV
November 19, 2026*; 8:30 p.m., ESPN2		vs. UNLV; Players Era 8 – 7th Place Game						Michelob Ultra Arena; Las Vegas, NV
November 24, 2026*; 6:00 p.m., B1G+		Sacred Heart						Jersey Mike's Arena; Piscataway, NJ
December 1, 2026; 8:00 p.m., FS1		at Indiana						Simon Skjodt Assembly Hall; Bloomington, IN
December 9, 2026; 6:30 p.m., BTN		Michigan						Jersey Mike's Arena; Piscataway, NJ
December 12, 2026*; 4:30 p.m., FS1		Seton Hall; Garden State Hardwood Classic						Jersey Mike's Arena; Piscataway, NJ
December 16, 2026*; 6:00 p.m., BTN		Saint Peter's						Jersey Mike's Arena; Piscataway, NJ
December 20, 2026*; 2:00 p.m., BTN		Army						Jersey Mike's Arena; Piscataway, NJ
December 29, 2026*; 6:00 p.m., NBCSN/Peacock		Delaware State						Jersey Mike's Arena; Piscataway, NJ
January 2, 2027; 12:00 p.m., BTN		at Purdue						Mackey Arena; West Lafayette, IN
January 5, 2027; 6:00 p.m., BTN		UCLA						Jersey Mike's Arena; Piscataway, NJ
January 5, 2027; 7:00 p.m., FS1		USC						Jersey Mike's Arena; Piscataway, NJ
January 12, 2027; 8:30 p.m., BTN		Iowa						Jersey Mike's Arena; Piscataway, NJ
January 16, 2027; 1:00 p.m., BTN		at Northwestern						Welsh-Ryan Arena; Evanston, IL
January 19, 2027; 7:00 p.m., BTN		at Maryland						Xfinity Center; College Park, MD
January 23, 2027; 12:00 p.m., BTN		Minnesota						Jersey Mike's Arena; Piscataway, NJ
January 27, 2027; 11:00 p.m., BTN		at Oregon						Matthew Knight Arena; Eugene, OR
January 30, 2027; 4:00 p.m., BTN		at Washington						Alaska Airlines Arena; Seattle, WA
February 3, 2027; 6:30 p.m., BTN		Purdue						Jersey Mike's Arena; Piscataway, NJ
February 6, 2027*; 11:00 a.m., ESPN2		vs. Syracuse; Empire Classic						Barclays Center; Brooklyn, NY
February 10, 2027; 6:30 p.m., BTN		at Michigan State						Breslin Student Events Center; East Lansing, MI
February 13, 2027; 12:00 p.m., BTN		Wisconsin						Jersey Mike's Arena; Piscataway, NJ
February 16, 2027; 7:00 p.m., BTN		at Nebraska						Pinnacle Bank Arena; Lincoln, NE
February 20, 2027; 1:00 p.m., NBCSN/Peacock		Penn State						Jersey Mike's Arena; Piscataway, NJ
February 25, 2027; 6:30 p.m., FS1		at Ohio State						Value City Arena; Columbus, OH
February 28, 2027; 5:00 p.m., NBCSN/Peacock		Maryland						Jersey Mike's Arena; Piscataway, NJ
March 3, 2027; 6:30 p.m., BTN		Illinois						Jersey Mike's Arena; Piscataway, NJ
March 7, 2027; 3:00 p.m., BTN		at Penn State						Value City Arena; Columbus, OH
Big Ten tournament
*Non-conference game. ^{#}Rankings from AP Poll. (#) Tournament seedings in parentheses. All times are in Eastern Time.
