= 2026–27 Wisconsin Badgers men's basketball team =

American college basketball season

2026–27 Wisconsin Badgers men's basketball
- Conference: Big Ten Conference
- Record: 4–2 (0–0 Big Ten)
- Head coach: Greg Gard (12th season)
- Associate head coach: Joe Krabbenhoft (11th season)
- Assistant coaches: Sharif Chambliss (6th season); Lance Randall (3rd season)
- Home arena: Kohl Center

2026–27 Big Ten Conference men's basketball standings
	Conf.				Overall
Team	W		L	PCT	W		L	PCT
Indiana	0	–	0	–	6	–	0	1.000
Minnesota	0	–	0	–	6	–	0	1.000
No. 24 Nebraska	0	–	0	–	5	–	0	1.000
No. 7 UCLA	0	–	0	–	5	–	0	1.000
No. 18т USC	0	–	0	–	5	–	0	1.000
Washington	0	–	0	–	4	–	0	1.000
No. 10 Illinois	0	–	0	–	5	–	1	.833
Penn State	0	–	0	–	5	–	1	.833
No. 2 Michigan State	0	–	0	–	4	–	1	.800
No. 18т Michigan	0	–	0	–	3	–	1	.750
Oregon	0	–	0	–	3	–	1	.750
Ohio State	0	–	0	–	4	–	2	.667
Purdue	0	–	0	–	4	–	2	.667
Rutgers	0	–	0	–	4	–	2	.667
Wisconsin	0	–	0	–	4	–	2	.667
Iowa	0	–	0	–	3	–	2	.600
Maryland	0	–	0	–	3	–	2	.600
Northwestern	0	–	0	–	3	–	3	.500
† 2027 Big Ten tournament winner As of November 21, 2026; Rankings from AP poll

The 2026–27 Wisconsin Badgers men's basketball team represents the University of Wisconsin–Madison in the 2026–27 NCAA Division I men's basketball season. The Badgers are led by 12th-year head coach Greg Gard and play their home games at the Kohl Center in Madison, Wisconsin as members of the Big Ten Conference.

== Previous season ==
The Badgers finished the 2025–26 season 24–11 and 14–6 in Big Ten play. As the No. 5 seed in the Big Ten tournament, they defeated Washington and Illinois before falling to Michigan in the semifinals. As an at-large bid to the NCAA tournament, they were the No. 5 seed in the West region. They were upset in the first round by High Point.

== Offseason ==
On March 25, 2026, forward Jack Robison was the first player to announce he would enter the transfer portal. Robison announced on April 15 that he transferred to play for the North Dakota State Bison. On March 28, forward Riccardo Greppi announced he would enter the transfer portal. On April 6, guard John Blackwell announced that he entered the transfer portal. A day later, on April 7, forward Aleksas Bieliauskas announced that he entered the transfer portal.

On April 17, the Badgers landed their first transfer portal commitment from senior Trey Autry, a guard from the George Washington Revolutionaries. The son of former Syracuse Orange head coach Adrian Autry, Trey averaged 11 points, 3.5 rebounds and 1.5 assists last season while shooting 38.5 percent from three. Later that day, Bieliauskas announced he transferred to play for the South Carolina Gamecocks. The following day, on April 18, the Badgers landed the commitment from senior Victory Onuetu, a forward from the Hofstra Pride. The Spaniard led the team with 6.9 rebounds per game while averaging 4.7 points and 1.0 blocks per contest. Later that same day, the Badgers landed senior Eian Elmer, a guard from the Miami RedHawks. He averaged 12.7 points, 5.9 rebounds and 1.1 assists per game and was named to the All-MAC Second Team en route to a historic perfect season for the RedHawks.

On April 21, Blackwell transferred to play for the Duke Blue Devils. On April 24, Greppi transferred to play for the Sam Houston Bearkats.

Despite previously exhausting his eligibility under the old model, guard Braeden Carrington sought to obtain an extra year under the NCAA's new "five-for-five" model. On October 21, Carrington was among the players granted a preliminary injunction in Glancey v. NCAA, rendering him eligible while the lawsuit continues.

=== Departures ===
All players listed as "graduated" are tentative departures unless otherwise noted.

Wisconsin Departures
Name	Number	Pos.	Height	Weight	Year	Hometown	Reason for Departure
Nick Boyd	2	G	6'3"	177	(redshirt) Senior	Garnerville, NY	Graduated
Andrew Rohde	7	G	6'6"	197	Senior	Brookfield, WI	Graduated
Jack Robison	11	F	6'6"	198	Sophomore	Lakeville, MN	Transferred to North Dakota State
Isaac Gard	15	G	6'3"	170	Senior	Oregon, WI	Walk-on; Graduated
Riccardo Greppi	18	F	6'10"	255	Sophomore	Lecco, Italy	Transferred to Sam Houston
John Blackwell	25	G	6'4"	194	Junior	Bloomfield Hills, MI	Transferred to Duke
Aleksas Bieliauskas	32	F	6'10"	235	Freshman	Kaunas, Lithuania	Transferred to South Carolina

=== Incoming transfers ===
Wisconsin incoming transfers
Name	Number	Pos.	Height	Weight	Year	Hometown	Previous school
Trey Autry	0	G	6'4"	210	Senior	Jamesville, NY	George Washington
Victory Onetu	6	F	6'11"	235	Senior	Alhaurín el Grande, Spain	Hofstra
Eian Elmer	55	G	6'6"	215	Senior	Covington, KY	Miami (OH)

=== Recruiting class ===
On August 25, 2024, Wisconsin landed their first commitment of the class in shooting guard LaTrevion Fenderson. On March 3, 2025, New Zealand shooting guard Jackson Ball of the Illawarra Hawks announced his commitment for 2026. Both Ball and Fenderson went on to sign their National Letters of Intent in November 2025.

On April 3, 2026, the Badgers landed 23-year-old point guard Owen Foxwell from the South East Melbourne Phoenix of the National Basketball League in Australia. Foxwell officially signed on April 21. A day later, on April 22, shooting guard Josh Manchester signed with the team. For a third straight day, on April 23, the Badgers signed a player, landing forward Isaac Riddle from Australia.

On October 6, it was announced that Manchester would miss the entire season after suffering a shoulder injury that required surgery. Ten days later, on October 16, it was announced that Fenderson was ruled academically ineligible for the entire season.

College recruiting
Name	Hometown	School	Height	Weight	Commit date
LaTrevion Fenderson; SG	Racine, WI	DME Academy	6 ft 4 in (1.93 m)	205 lb (93 kg)	Aug 25, 2024
LaTrevion Fenderson; SG	Recruit ratings: 247Sports: On3: (NR)				
Jackson Ball; SG	Napier, New Zealand	Illawarra Hawks	6 ft 4 in (1.93 m)	185 lb (84 kg)	Mar 3, 2025
Jackson Ball; SG	Recruit ratings: No ratings found				
Owen Foxwell; PG	Bulleen, Australia	South East Melbourne Phoenix	6 ft 2 in (1.88 m)	180 lb (82 kg)	Apr 3, 2026
Owen Foxwell; PG	Recruit ratings: No ratings found				
Josh Manchester; SG	Mount Horeb, WI	Mount Horeb High School	6 ft 4 in (1.93 m)	170 lb (77 kg)	Apr 22, 2026
Josh Manchester; SG	Recruit ratings: No ratings found				
Isaac Riddle; F	Golden Grove, Australia	Centre of Excellence	6 ft 8 in (2.03 m)	200 lb (91 kg)	Apr 23, 2026
Isaac Riddle; F	Recruit ratings: No ratings found				
Overall recruit ranking: Rivals: 107 247Sports: 106
Note: In many cases, Scout, Rivals, 247Sports, On3, and ESPN may conflict in their listings of height and weight.; In these cases, the average was taken. ESPN grades are on a 100-point scale.; Sources: "2026 Wisconsin Commitments". Rivals.; "ESPN- Wisconsin Badgers Men's Basketball Recruiting". ESPN.; "2026 Team Ranking". Rivals.

== Roster ==
2026–27 Wisconsin Badgers men's basketball team
Players
Coaches

Pos.	#	Name	Height	Weight	Year	Previous school	Hometown
G	0	Trey Autry	6 ft 4 in (1.93 m)	211 lb (96 kg)	Sr	George Washington	Jamesville, New York
G	1	Braeden Carrington	6 ft 5 in (1.96 m)	197 lb (89 kg)	GS	Tulsa	Brooklyn Park, Minnesota
G	2	Josh Manchester (injured)	6 ft 4 in (1.93 m)	182 lb (83 kg)	Fr	Mount Horeb High School	Mount Horeb, Wisconsin
G	3	LeTrevion Fenderson (I)	6 ft 3 in (1.91 m)	211 lb (96 kg)	Fr	St. John's Northwestern Military Academy	Racine, Wisconsin
G	4	Zach Kizinger	6 ft 3 in (1.91 m)	185 lb (84 kg)	So	De Pere High School	De Pere, Wisconsin
G	5	Jack Janicki	6 ft 5 in (1.96 m)	200 lb (91 kg)	RS Sr	White Bear Lake Area High School	White Bear Lake, Minnesota
F	6	Victory Onuetu	6 ft 11 in (2.11 m)	238 lb (108 kg)	Sr	Hofstra	Alhaurín el Grande, Spain
G	9	Jackson Ball	6 ft 5 in (1.96 m)	217 lb (98 kg)	Fr	Illawarra Hawks	Napier, New Zealand
F	11	Isaac Riddle	6 ft 8 in (2.03 m)	210 lb (95 kg)	Fr	Centre of Excellence	Golden Grove, Australia
G	13	Hayden Jones	6 ft 6 in (1.98 m)	198 lb (90 kg)	So	Nelson Giants	Nelson, New Zealand
G	15	Owen Foxwell	6 ft 2 in (1.88 m)	192 lb (87 kg)	GS	South East Melbourne Phoenix	Bulleen, Australia
F	22	Austin Rapp	6 ft 10 in (2.08 m)	238 lb (108 kg)	Jr	Portland	Melbourne, Australia
C	23	Will Garlock	7 ft 0 in (2.13 m)	243 lb (110 kg)	So	Middleton High School	Middleton, Wisconsin
F	31	Nolan Winter	7 ft 0 in (2.13 m)	235 lb (107 kg)	Sr	Lakeville North High School	Lakeville, Minnesota
G	55	Eian Elmer	6 ft 6 in (1.98 m)	222 lb (101 kg)	Sr	Miami (OH)	Covington, Kentucky

Head coach

- Greg Gard (UW-Platteville)

Assistant coach(es)

- Joe Krabbenhoft (Wisconsin)
- Sharif Chambliss (Wisconsin)
- Lance Randall (Beloit)

Legend

- (C) Team captain
- (S) Suspended
- (I) Ineligible
- (W) Walk-on
- Injured
- Current redshirt

Roster

== Schedule and results ==
Date time, TV	Rank^{#}	Opponent^{#}	Result	Record	High points	High rebounds	High assists	Site (attendance) city, state
Exhibition
October 10, 2026*; 12:00 p.m., B1G+		UW–Parkside	W 94–71	–	15 – Winter	9 – Winter	6 – Foxwell	Kohl Center (4,201); Madison, WI
October 15, 2026*; 6:30 p.m.		at Green Bay	W 96–77	—	21 – Foxwell	7 – Winter	6 – Foxwell	Resch Center (4,651); Green Bay, WI
October 27, 2026*; 6:00 p.m., B1G+		Oklahoma State	W 82–65	—	19 – Foxwell	8 – Onetu	3 – Tied	Kohl Center (13,551); Madison, WI
Regular season
November 2, 2026*; 6:30 p.m., B1G+		Denver	W 75–68	1–0	18 – Elmer	14 – Winter	7 – Foxwell	Kohl Center (13,518); Madison, WI
November 6, 2026*; 6:30 p.m., B1G+		Delaware	W 73–64	2–0	16 – Tied	11 – Onuetu	6 – Foxwell	Kohl Center (14,106); Madison, WI
November 10, 2026*; 7:30 p.m., BTN		Fairfield	W 89–42	3–0	15 – Rapp	8 – Onuetu	3 – Foxwell	Kohl Center (13,500); Madison, WI
November 15, 2026*; 7:00 p.m., BTN		Coastal Carolina	W 89–81	4–0	33 – Foxwell	10 – Garlock	6 – Foxwell	Kohl Center (13,794); Madison, WI
November 19, 2026*; 7:30 p.m., CBSSN		vs. Seton Hall; Bahamas Championship Semifinal	L 69–74	4–1	18 – Rapp	6 – Tied	6 – Foxwell	Baha Mar Convention Center (1,447); Nassau, The Bahamas
November 20, 2026*; 6:00 p.m., CBSSN		vs. Murray State; Bahamas Championship third-place game	L 53–70	4–2	12 – Ball	6 – Tied	3 – Tied	Baha Mar Convention Center (1,087); Nassau, The Bahamas
November 25, 2026*; 6:00 p.m., BTN		Northeastern						Kohl Center; Madison, WI
December 1, 2026; 8:00 p.m., Peacock / NBCSN		at Northwestern						Welsh–Ryan Arena; Evanston, IL
December 5, 2026*; 1:00 p.m., Peacock / NBCSN		at Marquette; Rivalry						Fiserv Forum; Milwaukee, WI
December 8, 2026; 8:00 p.m., Peacock / NBCSN		Purdue						Kohl Center; Madison, WI
December 12, 2026*; 11:00 a.m., FOX		vs. Villanova; Philly Hoops Showdown						Xfinity Mobile Arena; Philadelphia, PA
December 19, 2026*; 3:00 p.m., ESPN		vs. Auburn; The Bad Boy Mowers Series – Nashville						Bridgestone Arena; Nashville, TN
December 22, 2026*; 7:00 p.m., BTN		Purdue Fort Wayne						Kohl Center; Madison, WI
December 30, 2026*; 7:00 p.m., BTN		Colorado State						Kohl Center; Madison, WI
January 2, 2027; 7:00 p.m., FOX		Illinois						Kohl Center; Madison, WI
January 6, 2027; 7:30 p.m., FS1		Iowa						Kohl Center; Madison, WI
January 9, 2027; 11:00 a.m., BTN		Minnesota						Kohl Center; Madison, WI
January 13, 2027; 6:00 p.m., BTN		Penn State						Kohl Center; Madison, WI
January 16, 2027; 5:00 p.m., FS1		at USC						Galen Center; Los Angeles, CA
January 19, 2027; 9:30 p.m., FS1		at UCLA						Pauley Pavilion; Los Angeles, CA
January 23, 2027; 1:00 p.m., BTN		Washington						Kohl Center; Madison, WI
January 26, 2027; 6:00 p.m., Peacock / NBCSN		at Maryland						Xfinity Center; College Park, MD
January 31, 2027; 12:00 p.m., FS1		at Minnesota						Williams Arena; Minneapolis, MN
February 3, 2027; 7:30 p.m., BTN		Oregon						Kohl Center; Madison, WI
February 6, 2027; 1:30 / 5:00 / 7:00 p.m., FOX		Michigan						Kohl Center; Madison, WI
February 9, 2027; 7:30 p.m., FS1		at Ohio State						Value City Arena; Columbus, OH
February 13, 2027; 11:00 a.m., BTN		at Rutgers						Jersey Mike's Arena; Piscataway, NJ
February 19, 2027; 7:00 p.m., FS1		Indiana						Kohl Center; Madison, WI
February 24, 2027; 7:30 p.m., FS1		at Iowa						Carver–Hawkeye Arena; Iowa City, IA
February 28, 2027; 12:30 p.m., CBS		at Illinois						State Farm Center; Champaign, IL
March 3, 2027; 7:30 p.m., BTN		Nebraska						Kohl Center; Madison, WI
March 6, 2027; 2:45 p.m., CBS		at Michigan State						Breslin Center; East Lansing, MI
*Non-conference game. ^{#}Rankings from AP Poll. (#) Tournament seedings in parentheses. All times are in Central Time.
