= 2026–27 Penn State Nittany Lions basketball team =

American college basketball season

2026–27 Penn State Nittany Lions basketball
- Conference: Big Ten Conference
- Record: 4–1 (0–0 Big Ten)
- Head coach: Mike Rhoades (4th season)
- Associate head coach: Jamal Brunt (4th season)
- Assistant coaches: Brent Scott (4th season); Talor Battle (3rd season); TBD (1st season)
- Home arena: Bryce Jordan Center

2026–27 Big Ten Conference men's basketball standings
	Conf.				Overall
Team	W		L	PCT	W		L	PCT
Indiana	0	–	0	–	6	–	0	1.000
Minnesota	0	–	0	–	6	–	0	1.000
No. 24 Nebraska	0	–	0	–	5	–	0	1.000
No. 7 UCLA	0	–	0	–	5	–	0	1.000
No. 18т USC	0	–	0	–	5	–	0	1.000
Washington	0	–	0	–	4	–	0	1.000
No. 10 Illinois	0	–	0	–	5	–	1	.833
Penn State	0	–	0	–	5	–	1	.833
No. 2 Michigan State	0	–	0	–	4	–	1	.800
No. 18т Michigan	0	–	0	–	3	–	1	.750
Oregon	0	–	0	–	3	–	1	.750
Ohio State	0	–	0	–	4	–	2	.667
Purdue	0	–	0	–	4	–	2	.667
Rutgers	0	–	0	–	4	–	2	.667
Wisconsin	0	–	0	–	4	–	2	.667
Iowa	0	–	0	–	3	–	2	.600
Maryland	0	–	0	–	3	–	2	.600
Northwestern	0	–	0	–	3	–	3	.500
† 2027 Big Ten tournament winner As of November 21, 2026; Rankings from AP poll

The 2026-27 Penn State Nittany Lions basketball team represents Pennsylvania State University during the 2026–27 NCAA Division I men's basketball season. They are led by fourth-year head coach Mike Rhoades, and play their home games at Bryce Jordan Center located in State College, Pennsylvania as members of the Big Ten Conference (B1G).

== Previous season ==
The Nittany Lions finished the 2025–26 season 12–20, 3–17 in Big Ten play to finish in 18th place. As the 18th seed in the Big Ten Tournament, they would lose to 15th seed Northwestern 76–66 in the First Round.

== Offseason ==
=== Departures ===
Penn State departures
Name	Number	Pos.	Height	Weight	Year	Hometown	Reason for departure
Mason Blackwood	1	F	6'7"	230	Freshman	Rochester, NY	Transferred to St. Bonaventure
Kayden Mingo	4	G	6'3"	195	Freshman	Farmingdale, NY	Transferred to Baylor
Freddie Dilione V	5	G	6'5"	195	(redshirt) Junior	Fayetteville, NC	Transferred to Georgia
Dominick Stewart	7	G	6'5"	195	Sophomore	Ocean Springs, MS	Transferred to Richmond
Melih Tunca	9	G	6'5"	195	Freshman	Istanbul, Turkey	Unknown
Eli Rice	11	G	6'8"	230	(redshirt) Sophomore	Bradenton, FL	Transferred to Middle Tennessee
Tibor Mirtič	16	F	6'9"	225	Freshman	Ljubljana, Slovenia	Entered transfer portal
Justin Houser	21	F	7'0"	235	Freshman	Camp Hill, PA	Transferred to Florida Gulf Coast
Saša Ciani	22	F	6'10"	240	Junior	Nova Gorica, Slovenia	Transferred to Sacramento State

=== Incoming transfers ===
Penn State incoming transfers
Name	Number	Pos.	Height	Weight	Year	Hometown	Previous school
Jay Rodgers	1	G	6'3"	185	Senior	Pickerington, OH	Central Connecticut State
Dasonte Bowen	5	G	6'2"	190	Graduate Student	Boston, MA	St. Bonaventure
Thomas Allard	14	G	6'7"	210	Graduate Student	Suwanee, GA	Alabama-Huntsville
Brant Byers	22	G/F	6'8"	200	(redshirt) Junior	Chambersburg, PA	Miami (OH)
Tim Oboh	33	F	6'11"	230	Junior	London, England	Buffalo
Roberts Blums	45	G	6'4"	190	Junior	Riga, Latvia	Davidson

== Recruiting classes ==
=== 2026 recruiting class ===
College recruiting (2026)
Name	Hometown	School	Height	Weight	Commit date
			N/A	N/A	
Recruit ratings: No ratings found
Overall recruit ranking:
Note: In many cases, Scout, Rivals, 247Sports, On3, and ESPN may conflict in their listings of height and weight.; In these cases, the average was taken. ESPN grades are on a 100-point scale.; Sources: "Penn State 2026 Basketball Commitments". Rivals.; "2026 Team Ranking". Rivals.; "Penn State 2026 Basketball Commits". 247Sports.

== Roster ==
2026–27 Penn State Nittany Lions men's basketball team
Players
Coaches

Pos.	#	Name	Height	Weight	Year	Previous school	Hometown
G	1	Jay Rodgers	6 ft 3 in (1.91 m)	185 lb (84 kg)	Sr	Central Connecticut State	Pickerington, OH
F	3	Ivan Jurić	7 ft 0 in (2.13 m)	250 lb (113 kg)		Sunrise Christian (Kans.)	Zagreb, Croatia
G	5	Dasonte Bowen	6 ft 2 in (1.88 m)	190 lb (86 kg)	GS	St. Bonaventure	Boston, MA
G	7	Andy Gemao	6 ft 1 in (1.85 m)	170 lb (77 kg)	Fr	Royal Crown School	Iligan City, Lanao del Norte, Philippines
F	8	Roko Prkačin	6 ft 8 in (2.03 m)	—		Nanterre 92	Zagreb, Croatia
G	9	Grant Spacciapolli	6 ft 3 in (1.91 m)	—	Fr	Pine-Richland High School	Pittsburgh, PA
F	10	Josh Reed	6 ft 8 in (2.03 m)	220 lb (100 kg)	GS	Cincinnati	Atlanta, GA
F	11	François Wibaut	6 ft 7 in (2.01 m)	—		Pau-Lacq-Orthez	Berck, France
G	12	Reggie Grodin	6 ft 5 in (1.96 m)	200 lb (91 kg)	RS Fr	The Newman School	Larchmont, NY
G	14	Thomas Allard	6 ft 7 in (2.01 m)	210 lb (95 kg)	GS	UAH	Suwanee, GA
G/F	22	Brant Byers	6 ft 8 in (2.03 m)	200 lb (91 kg)	RS Jr	Miami (OH)	Chambersburg, PA
F	33	Tim Oboh	6 ft 11 in (2.11 m)	230 lb (104 kg)	Jr	Buffalo	London, England
G	45	Roberts Blums	6 ft 4 in (1.93 m)	190 lb (86 kg)	Jr	Davidson	Riga, Latvia
F	77	Aleksandar Zečević	6 ft 9 in (2.06 m)	—	Fr	Gimnazija Prokuplje	Prokuplje, Serbia

Head coach

- Mike Rhoades (Lebanon Valley)

Assistant coach(es)

- Jamal Brunt (Randolph–Macon)
- Brent Scott (Rice)
- Talor Battle (Penn State)
- Joe Crispin (Penn State)

Legend

- (C) Team captain
- (S) Suspended
- (I) Ineligible
- (W) Walk-on
- Injured
- Current redshirt

Roster

== Schedule and results ==
Date time, TV	Rank^{#}	Opponent^{#}	Result	Record	High points	High rebounds	High assists	Site (attendance) city, state
Exhibition
October 17, 2026*; 4:00 p.m.		vs. St. Bonaventure	W 68–65	—	18 – Reed	8 – Reed	8 – Rodgers	KeyBank Center (3500); Buffalo, NY
October 26, 2026*; 7:00 p.m.		at Drexel	W 68–57	—	17 – Juric	7 – Bowen	4 – Allard	Daskalakis Athletic Center (1,307); Philadelphia, PA
Non-Conference Regular season
November 2, 2026*; 7:30 p.m., B1G+		Canisius	W 97–57	1–0	28 – Prkacin	15 – Juric	4 – Blums	Bryce Jordan Center (4,962); State College, Pennsylvania
November 5, 2026*; 6:00 p.m., BTN		Chattanooga	W 97–93	2–0	25 – Reed	10 – Juric	4 – Tied	Bryce Jordan Center (4,935); State College, Pennsylvania
November 8, 2026*; 8:00 p.m., ESPN2		vs. Pittsburgh	L 76–82	2–1	16 – Juric	13 – Juric	2 – Tied	The Palestra (2,178); Philadelphia, Pennsylvania
November 12, 2026*; 6:30 p.m., B1G+		Mercyhurst	W 72–57	3–1	20 – Juric	15 – Juric	7 – Bowen	Bryce Jordan Center (4,884); State College, Pennsylvania
November 15, 2026*; 4:30 p.m., Peacock/NBCSN		New Haven	W 86–52	4–1	20 – Reed	10 – Tied	4 – Bowen	Bryce Jordan Center (5,462); State College, Pennsylvania
November 18, 2026*; 6:30 p.m., BTN		IU Indy						Bryce Jordan Center; State College, Pennsylvania
November 25, 2026*; 5:00 p.m., ESPNU		vs. Memphis; Battle 4 Atlantis						Imperial Arena; Paradise Island, Bahamas
December 1, 2026*; 7:00 p.m., B1G+		Albany						Bryce Jordan Center; State College, Pennsylvania
December 8, 2026; 8:00 p.m., BTN		Nebraska						Bryce Jordan Center; State College, Pennsylvania
December 12, 2026; 2:00 p.m., FS1		at Illinois						State Farm Center; Champaign, Illinois
December 16, 2026*; 6:30 p.m., B1G+		UT Martin						Bryce Jordan Center; State College, Pennsylvania
December 19, 2026*; 2:30 p.m., Peacock/NBCSN		Lafayette						Rec Hall; State College, Pennsylvania
December 22, 2026*; TBA, TBA		vs. Saint Joseph's						GIANT Center; Hershey, Pennsylvania
January 2, 2027; 2:00 p.m., BTN		Oregon						Bryce Jordan Center; State College, Pennsylvania
January 6, 2027; 8:30 p.m., BTN		at Minnesota						The Barn; Minneapolis, Minnesota
January 10, 2027; 12:00 p.m., BTN		Northwestern						Bryce Jordan Center; State College, Pennsylvania
January 13, 2027; 7:00 p.m., BTN		at Wisconsin						Kohl Center; Madison, Wisconsin
January 17, 2027; 12:00 p.m., BTN		at Ohio State						Value City Arena; Columbus, Ohio
January 20, 2027; 6:30 p.m., BTN		Purdue						Bryce Jordan Center; State College, Pennsylvania
January 23, 2027; 4:00 p.m., BTN		at Iowa						Carver-Hawkeye Arena; Iowa City, Iowa
January 26, 2027; 7:00 p.m., BTN		at Michigan State						Breslin Center; East Lansing, Michigan
January 30, 2027; 12:00 p.m., BTN		Maryland						Bryce Jordan Center; State College, Pennsylvania
February 2, 2027; 6:00 p.m., FS1		Indiana						Bryce Jordan Center; State College, Pennsylvania
February 6, 2027; 12:00 p.m., BTN		Ohio State						Bryce Jordan Center; State College, Pennsylvania
February 12, 2027; 9:30 p.m., FS1		at Nebraska						Pinnacle Bank Arena; Lincoln, Nebraska
February 17, 2027; 7:00 p.m., BTN		Washington						Bryce Jordan Center; State College, Pennsylvania
February 20, 2027; 1:00 p.m., Pacock/NBCSN		at Rutgers						Jersey Mike's Arena; Piscataway, New Jersey
February 23, 2027; 6:00 p.m., FS1		Michigan						Bryce Jordan Center; State College, Pennsylvania
February 27, 2027; 10:30 p.m., BTN		at UCLA						Pauley Pavilion; Los Angeles, California
March 2, 2027; 9:00 p.m., BTN		at USC						Galen Center; Los Angeles, California
March 7, 2027; 3:00 p.m., BTN		Rutgers						Bryce Jordan Center; State College, Pennsylvania
Big Ten Tournament
March 10–14, 2027; TBA, TBA		vs. TBA; Big Ten Tournament						Gainbridge Fieldhouse; Indianapolis, Indiana
*Non-conference game. ^{#}Rankings from AP Poll. (#) Tournament seedings in parentheses. All times are in Eastern Time.
