= 2026–27 Minnesota Golden Gophers men's basketball team =

US college basketball team

2026–27 Minnesota Golden Gophers men's basketball
- Conference: Big Ten Conference
- Record: 6–0 (0–0 Big Ten)
- Head coach: Niko Medved (2nd season)
- Assistant coaches: Brian Cooley (2nd season); Armon Gates (2nd season); Dave Thorson (6th season); Aaron Katsuma (2nd season); Lexus Williams (1st season)
- Home arena: The Barn

2026–27 Big Ten Conference men's basketball standings
	Conf.				Overall
Team	W		L	PCT	W		L	PCT
Indiana	0	–	0	–	6	–	0	1.000
Minnesota	0	–	0	–	6	–	0	1.000
No. 24 Nebraska	0	–	0	–	5	–	0	1.000
No. 7 UCLA	0	–	0	–	5	–	0	1.000
No. 18т USC	0	–	0	–	5	–	0	1.000
Washington	0	–	0	–	4	–	0	1.000
No. 10 Illinois	0	–	0	–	5	–	1	.833
Penn State	0	–	0	–	5	–	1	.833
No. 2 Michigan State	0	–	0	–	4	–	1	.800
No. 18т Michigan	0	–	0	–	3	–	1	.750
Oregon	0	–	0	–	3	–	1	.750
Ohio State	0	–	0	–	4	–	2	.667
Purdue	0	–	0	–	4	–	2	.667
Rutgers	0	–	0	–	4	–	2	.667
Wisconsin	0	–	0	–	4	–	2	.667
Iowa	0	–	0	–	3	–	2	.600
Maryland	0	–	0	–	3	–	2	.600
Northwestern	0	–	0	–	3	–	3	.500
† 2027 Big Ten tournament winner As of November 21, 2026; Rankings from AP poll

The 2026–27 Minnesota Golden Gophers men's basketball team represents the University of Minnesota in the 2026–27 NCAA Division I men's basketball season. The Gophers, led by second-year head coach Niko Medved, play their home games at The Barn in Minneapolis, Minnesota as members of the Big Ten Conference.

== Previous season ==
The Gophers finished the 2025–26 season 15–18, 8–12 in Big Ten play to finish in 11th place. As the No. 11 seed in the Big Ten tournament, they lost to Rutgers in the second round. The Gophers accepted a bid to the College Basketball Crown, where they lost to Baylor in the quarterfinals.

== Offseason ==
=== Departures ===
Minnesota departures
Name	Number	Pos.	Height	Weight	Year	Hometown	Reason for departure
Chansey Willis Jr.	0	G	6'2"	205	Senior	Detroit, MI	Transferred to Kent State
Nehemiah Turner	4	F	6'10"	270	Sophomore	Auburndale, FL	Transferred to Jacksonville
Langston Reynolds	6	G	6'4"	215	Senior	Denver, CO	Graduated
Maximus Gizzi	11	G	6'1"	185	GS Senior	New Palestine, IN	Graduated
RJ Spencer	12	G	6'3"	185	Senior	Blaine, MN	Walk-on; Graduated
Chance Stephens	13	G	6'3"	185	RS Junior	Riverside, CA	Transferred
BJ Omot	20	F	6'8"	200	RS Junior	Mankato, MN	Transferred to Cal State Northridge
Robert Vaihola	22	F	6'8"	265	RS Senior	San Mateo, CA	Transferred to San Jose State

=== Incoming transfers ===
Minnesota incoming transfers
Name	Number	Pos.	Height	Weight	Year	Hometown	Previous school
Kyan Evans	0	G	6'2"	175	Senior	Kansas City, MO	North Carolina
Malick Kordel	4	C	7'2"	275	Sophomore	Oberhausen, Germany	Michigan
Malachi Palmer	7	G	6'6"	220	Junior	Harrisburg, PA	Villanova
Nolan Groves	10	G	6'5"	205	Sophomore	Orono, MN	Texas Tech
Winters Grady	22	G/F	6'6"	210	RS Freshman	Tualatin, OR	Michigan

=== Recruiting class ===
College recruiting
Name	Hometown	School	Height	Weight	Commit date
Cedric Tomes; PG	Saint Paul, MN	East Ridge High School	6 ft 0 in (1.83 m)	160 lb (73 kg)	May 10, 2025
Cedric Tomes; PG	Recruit ratings: Rivals: 247Sports: ESPN: (NR)				
Nolen Anderson; SF	Eden Prairie, MN	Wayzata High School	6 ft 6 in (1.98 m)	180 lb (82 kg)	Jul 31, 2025
Nolen Anderson; SF	Recruit ratings: Rivals: 247Sports: ESPN: (NR)				
Chadrack Mpoyi; C	Irvine, CA	Crean Lutheran High School	6 ft 10 in (2.08 m)	240 lb (110 kg)	Sep 18, 2025
Chadrack Mpoyi; C	Recruit ratings: Rivals: 247Sports: ESPN: (80)				
Overall recruit ranking: Rivals: 48 247Sports: 38
Note: In many cases, Scout, Rivals, 247Sports, On3, and ESPN may conflict in their listings of height and weight.; In these cases, the average was taken. ESPN grades are on a 100-point scale.; Sources: "2026 Team Ranking". Rivals.

=== Renaming of Williams Arena ===
On June 12, 2026, the University of Minnesota announced that Williams Arena was being renamed to The Barn by Blue Cross and Blue Shield of Minnesota as part of a ten-year agreement worth $17 million. The renaming makes official the long-used nickname for the arena, "The Barn". The arena, originally known as the University of Minnesota Field House, had borne the name Williams Arena since 1950 in honor of former Gophers football coach Dr. Henry L. Williams.

=== Cade Tyson eligibility ===
On September 8, 2026, the University of Minnesota announced that Cade Tyson had rejoined the team while awaiting the outcome of his eligibility status. Tyson was granted an extra year of elibility per a federal court preliminary injunction that gave high school class of 2022 athletes who exhausted their fourth season of college eligibility last spring a fifth season in 2026–27. However, the United States Court of Appeals for the Tenth Circuit halted the injunction in late August.

== Roster ==
2026–27 Minnesota Golden Gophers men's basketball team
Players
Coaches

Pos.	#	Name	Height	Weight	Year	Previous school	Hometown
G	0	Kyan Evans	6 ft 2 in (1.88 m)	175 lb (79 kg)	Sr	North Carolina	Kansas City, MO
G	1	Isaac Asuma	6 ft 3 in (1.91 m)	205 lb (93 kg)	Jr	Cherry HS	Cherry, MN
F	2	Grayson Grove	6 ft 9 in (2.06 m)	220 lb (100 kg)	RS So	Alexandria Area HS	Alexandria, MN
F	3	Bobby Durkin	6 ft 7 in (2.01 m)	220 lb (100 kg)	Sr	Davidson	Darien, IL
C	4	Malick Kordel	7 ft 2 in (2.18 m)	275 lb (125 kg)	So	Michigan	Oberhausen, Germany
F	5	Jaylen Crocker-Johnson	6 ft 8 in (2.03 m)	240 lb (109 kg)	Sr	Colorado State	San Antonio, TX
G	6	Cedric Tomes	6 ft 1 in (1.85 m)	170 lb (77 kg)	Fr	East Ridge HS	Woodbury, MN
G	7	Malachi Palmer	6 ft 6 in (1.98 m)	220 lb (100 kg)	Jr	Villanova	Harrisburg, PA
G	8	Max Lorenson (W)	6 ft 2 in (1.88 m)	175 lb (79 kg)	RS Fr	Eden Prairie HS	Eden Prairie, MN
G	9	Kai Shinholster	6 ft 5 in (1.96 m)	175 lb (79 kg)	So	William Penn Charter School	Woolwich Township, NJ
G	10	Nolan Groves	6 ft 5 in (1.96 m)	205 lb (93 kg)	So	Texas Tech	Orono, MN
G	21	Blake Nixon Jr. (W)	6 ft 3 in (1.91 m)	170 lb (77 kg)	Fr	Academy of Holy Angels	Minneapolis, MN
G/F	22	Winters Grady	6 ft 6 in (1.98 m)	210 lb (95 kg)	RS Fr	Michigan	Tualatin, OR
F	31	Nolen Anderson	6 ft 8 in (2.03 m)	205 lb (93 kg)	Fr	Wayzata HS	Eden Prairie, MN
C	55	Chadrack Mpoyi	6 ft 11 in (2.11 m)	245 lb (111 kg)	Fr	Crean Lutheran HS	Likasi, DR Congo
G/F		Cade Tyson (I)	6 ft 7 in (2.01 m)	195 lb (88 kg)	GS	North Carolina	Monroe, NC

Head coach

- Niko Medved (Minnesota)

Assistant coach(es)

- Brian Cooley (Nebraska Wesleyan)
- Armon Gates (Kent State)
- Dave Thorson (Hamline)
- Aaron Katsuma (Minnesota)
- Lexus Williams (Valparaiso)

Legend

- (C) Team captain
- (S) Suspended
- (I) Ineligible
- (W) Walk-on
- Injured
- Current redshirt

Roster

== Schedule and results ==
On June 23, 2026, Minnesota announced that it would play California in a neutral site game at the Sanford Pentagon in Sioux Falls, SD. It marks the second consecutive year and fifth time overall that the Gophers have played a neutral site game at the Sanford Pentagon. On July 15, 2026, Minnesota announced it had reached an agreement for a home-and-home series with Cincinnati, with Minnesota playing at Cincinnati on November 9, 2026 and then hosting the Bearcats in Minneapolis during the 2027–28 season.

Date time, TV	Rank^{#}	Opponent^{#}	Result	Record	High points	High rebounds	High assists	Site (attendance) city, state
Exhibition
October 15, 2026*; 7:00 p.m., B1G+		Omaha	W 72–52	–	13 – Kordel	8 – Crocker-Johnson	7 – Evans	The Barn (7,269); Minneapolis, MN
October 23, 2026*; 7:30 p.m., YouTube		at Creighton	L 86–89 ^{2OT}	–	32 – Asuma	11 – Tied	4 – Durkin	CHI Health Center Omaha (16,008); Omaha, NE
Regular season
November 2, 2026*; 8:00 p.m., B1G+		North Dakota	W 85–50	1–0	16 – Durkin	6 – Tied	6 – Tied	The Barn (7,222); Minneapolis, MN
November 6, 2026*; 7:00 p.m., Peacock / NBCSN		St. Thomas (MN)	W 76–62	2–0	20 – Asuma	10 – Crocker-Johnson	4 – Evans	The Barn (10,604); Minneapolis, MN
November 9, 2026*; 6:00 p.m., ESPN+		at Cincinnati; Twyman-Stokes Classic	W 63–61	3–0	26 – Evans	10 – Evans	5 – Evans	Fifth Third Arena (10,419); Cincinnati, OH
November 12, 2026*; 7:00 p.m., B1G+		Southern	W 91–61	4–0	23 – Asuma	6 – Grove	6 – Tied	The Barn (6,685); Minneapolis, MN
November 16, 2026*; 7:00 p.m., BTN		Western Illinois	W 99–63	5–0	21 – Asuma	9 – Crocker-Johnson	10 – Evans	The Barn (6,831); Minneapolis, MN
November 20, 2026*; 11:30 a.m., ESPN2		vs. Oklahoma State; Charleston Classic	W 85–70	6–0	17 – Asuma	8 – Asuma	10 – Evans	TD Arena; Charleston, SC
November 22, 2026*; 5:00 p.m., ESPN2		vs. Utah; Charleston Classic						TD Arena; Charleston, SC
November 28, 2026*; 7:00 p.m., BTN		vs. California						Sanford Pentagon; Sioux Falls, SD
December 2, 2026; 5:30 p.m., BTN		at Michigan State						Breslin Center; East Lansing, MI
December 8, 2026; 6:00 p.m., Peacock / NBCSN		Illinois						The Barn; Minneapolis, MN
December 12, 2026*; 12:30 p.m., The CW		vs. SMU; Dallas Duel						Comerica Center; Frisco, TX
December 16, 2026*; 7:30 p.m., BTN		Texas Southern						The Barn; Minneapolis, MN
December 20, 2026*; 1:00 p.m., BTN		Alcorn State						The Barn; Minneapolis, MN
December 29, 2026*; 7:00 p.m., B1G+		UTSA						The Barn; Minneapolis, MN
January 3, 2027; 6:30 p.m., BTN		at Northwestern						Welsh–Ryan Arena; Evanston, IL
January 6, 2027; 7:30 p.m., BTN		Penn State						The Barn; Minneapolis, MN
January 9, 2027; 11:00 a.m., BTN		at Wisconsin						Kohl Center; Madison, WI
January 12, 2027; 5:30 p.m., BTN		at Michigan						Crisler Center; Ann Arbor, MI
January 17, 2027; 1:00 p.m., BTN		Purdue						The Barn; Minneapolis, MN
January 20, 2027; 7:30 p.m., BTN		Indiana						The Barn; Minneapolis, MN
January 23, 2027; 11:00 a.m., BTN		at Rutgers						Jersey Mike's Arena; Piscataway, NJ
January 26, 2027; 8:00 p.m., BTN		Washington						The Barn; Minneapolis, MN
January 31, 2027; 12:00 p.m., FS1		Wisconsin						The Barn; Minneapolis, MN
February 6, 2027; 3:00 p.m., FS1		at USC						Galen Center; Los Angeles, CA
February 9, 2027; 9:00 p.m., Peacock		at UCLA						Pauley Pavilion; Los Angeles, CA
February 13, 2027; 1:00 p.m., BTN		Oregon						The Barn; Minneapolis, MN
February 16, 2027; 7:00 p.m., FS1		Michigan						The Barn; Minneapolis, MN
February 21, 2027; 1:00 p.m., Peacock / NBCSN		Northwestern						The Barn; Minneapolis, MN
February 24, 2027; 5:30 p.m., BTN		at Maryland						Xfinity Center; College Park, MD
February 27, 2027; 1:00 p.m., BTN		at Iowa						Carver–Hawkeye Arena; Iowa City, IA
March 4, 2027; 7:30 p.m., FS1		Ohio State						The Barn; Minneapolis, MN
March 7, 2027; 6:00 p.m., FS1		at Nebraska						Pinnacle Bank Arena; Lincoln, NE
Big Ten tournament
March 10–14, 2027		vs.						Gainbridge Fieldhouse; Indianapolis, IN
*Non-conference game. ^{#}Rankings from AP poll. (#) Tournament seedings in parentheses. All times are in Central Time.
