= 2026–27 Washington Huskies men's basketball team =

American collegiate basketball season

2026–27 Washington Huskies men's basketball
- Conference: Big Ten Conference
- Record: 4–0 (0–0 Big Ten)
- Head coach: Danny Sprinkle (3rd season)
- Associate head coach: Andy Hill (3rd season)
- Assistant coaches: DeAndre Haynes (1st season); Mike Mennenga (1st season); Abdul Gaddy (1st season); Charles Klask (1st season)
- Home arena: Alaska Airlines Arena

2026–27 Big Ten Conference men's basketball standings
	Conf.				Overall
Team	W		L	PCT	W		L	PCT
Indiana	0	–	0	–	5	–	0	1.000
Minnesota	0	–	0	–	5	–	0	1.000
No. 24 Nebraska	0	–	0	–	5	–	0	1.000
No. 7 UCLA	0	–	0	–	5	–	0	1.000
No. 18т USC	0	–	0	–	5	–	0	1.000
Washington	0	–	0	–	4	–	0	1.000
Penn State	0	–	0	–	5	–	1	.833
No. 10 Illinois	0	–	0	–	4	–	1	.800
No. 2 Michigan State	0	–	0	–	4	–	1	.800
Wisconsin	0	–	0	–	4	–	1	.800
No. 18т Michigan	0	–	0	–	3	–	1	.750
Oregon	0	–	0	–	3	–	1	.750
Ohio State	0	–	0	–	4	–	2	.667
Rutgers	0	–	0	–	4	–	2	.667
Northwestern	0	–	0	–	3	–	2	.600
Purdue	0	–	0	–	3	–	2	.600
Iowa	0	–	0	–	2	–	2	.500
Maryland	0	–	0	–	2	–	2	.500
† 2027 Big Ten tournament winner As of November 20, 2026; Rankings from AP poll

The 2026–27 Washington Huskies men's basketball team will represent the University of Washington in the 2026–27 NCAA Division I men's basketball season. The Huskies, led by third-year head coach Danny Sprinkle, play their home games at Alaska Airlines Arena at Hec Edmundson Pavilion in Seattle, Washington as third-year members of the Big Ten Conference.

== Previous season ==
The Huskies finished the 2025–26 season 16–17, 7–13 in Big Ten play to finish in a tie with USC for 12th place. As the No. 12 seed in the Big Ten tournament, they defeated USC in the second round before falling to Wisconsin in the third round.

== Offseason ==
=== Departures ===
Washington departures
Name	Number	Pos.	Height	Weight	Year	Hometown	Reason for departure
Quimari Peterson	0	G	6'1"	190	Graduate student	Gary, IN	Graduated
Desmond Claude	1	G	6'6"	205	Senior	New Haven, CT	Graduated
Zoom Diallo	5	G	6'6"	195	Sophomore	Tacoma, WA	Transferred to Kentucky
Hannes Steinbach	6	F	6'11"	248	Freshmen	Würzburg, Germany	Declared for 2026 NBA draft; selected 14th overall by Charlotte Hornets
Christian Nitu	7	F	6'11"	220	Sophomore	Whitby, ON	Transferred to McNeese
Bryson Tucker	8	F	6'7"	207	Sophomore	Arlington, VA	Declared for 2026 NBA draft; undrafted
Franck Kepnang	11	C	6'11"	253	Graduate student	Beaumont, TX	Transferred to Kentucky
JJ Mandaquit	23	G	6'1"	175	Freshman	Hilo, HI	Transferred to Arizona
Courtland Muldrew	41	G	6'3"	170	Freshman	Arlington, TX	Transferred to Georgia Tech
Jacob Ognacevic	41	F	6'8"	220	Graduate student	Sheboygan, WI	Graduated

=== Incoming transfers ===
Washington incoming transfers
Name	Number	Pos.	Height	Weight	Year	Hometown	Previous school
Ryan Beasley	0	G	5'11"	205	Senior	San Ramon, CA	San Francisco
Parker Friedrichsen	5	G	6'4"	185	Senior	Bixby, OK	Davidson
LeJuan Watts	8	F	6'6"	225	Senior	Clovis, CA	Texas Tech
Steele Venters	11	G	6'7"	200	Graduate student	Ellensburg, WA	Gonzaga
Tayshawn Comer	12	G	6'1"	190	Graduate student (Note: Comer was eligible per a federal court preliminary injunction that gave high school class of 2022 athletes who exhausted their fourth season of college eligibility last spring a fifth season in 2026–27.)	Indianapolis, IN	Nevada
Harun Zrno	13	G	6'7"	220	Sophomore	Sarajevo, Bosnia and Herzegovina	Rutgers

=== 2026 recruiting class ===
College recruiting
Name	Hometown	School	Height	Weight	Commit date
Lattimore Ford; SF	Snoqualmie, WA	Mount Si High School	6 ft 6 in (1.98 m)	185 lb (84 kg)	Apr 24, 2026
Lattimore Ford; SF	Recruit ratings: Rivals: 247Sports:				
Wini Braga; PF	Belo Horizonte, Brazil	Minas	6 ft 9 in (2.06 m)	200 lb (91 kg)	May 5, 2026
Wini Braga; PF	Recruit ratings: No ratings found				
Tristan Devers; CG	Melbourne, Australia	Brisbane Bullets	6 ft 4 in (1.93 m)	190 lb (86 kg)	May 20, 2026
Tristan Devers; CG	Recruit ratings: No ratings found				
Nikola Džepina; SF	Belgrade, Serbia	Valencia Basket	6 ft 9 in (2.06 m)	200 lb (91 kg)	Oct 21, 2026
Nikola Džepina; SF	Recruit ratings: No ratings found				
Overall recruit ranking: Rivals: 123 247Sports: 139
Note: In many cases, Scout, Rivals, 247Sports, On3, and ESPN may conflict in their listings of height and weight.; In these cases, the average was taken. ESPN grades are on a 100-point scale.; Sources: "2026 Washington Commits". Rivals.; "ESPN- Washington Huskies Men's Basketball Recruiting". ESPN.; "2026 Team Ranking". Rivals.

== Roster ==
2026–27 Washington Huskies men's basketball team
Players
Coaches

Pos.	#	Name	Height	Weight	Year	Previous school	Hometown
G	0	Ryan Beasley	5 ft 11 in (1.8 m)	180 lb (82 kg)	Sr	San Francisco	San Ramon, CA
F	1	Lattimore Ford	6 ft 6 in (1.98 m)	195 lb (88 kg)	Fr	Mount Si HS	Snoqualmie, WA
G	3	BJ Roy	6 ft 2 in (1.88 m)	160 lb (73 kg)	So	Garfield HS	Seattle, WA
F	4	Jasir Rencher	6 ft 5 in (1.96 m)	180 lb (82 kg)	So	Archbishop Riordan	Oakland, CA
G	5	Parker Friedrichsen	6 ft 4 in (1.93 m)	185 lb (84 kg)	Sr	Davidson	Bixby, OK
G	6	Tristan Devers	6 ft 4 in (1.93 m)	190 lb (86 kg)	Fr	Brisbane Bullets	Melbourne, Australia
F	8	LeJuan Watts	6 ft 6 in (1.98 m)	225 lb (102 kg)	RS Sr	Texas Tech	Fresno, CA
G	9	Wesley Yates III	6 ft 4 in (1.93 m)	200 lb (91 kg)	RS Jr	USC	Beaumont, TX
G	11	Steele Venters	6 ft 7 in (2.01 m)	200 lb (91 kg)	GS	Gonzaga	Ellensburg, WA
G	12	Tayshawn Comer	6 ft 1 in (1.85 m)	204 lb (93 kg)	GS	Nevada	Indianapolis, IN
G	13	Harun Zrno	6 ft 7 in (2.01 m)	220 lb (100 kg)	Sr	Rutgers	Sarajevo, Bosnia and Herzegovina
F	14	Mady Traoré	6 ft 11 in (2.11 m)	195 lb (88 kg)	Sr	Frank Phillips College	Paris, France
F	15	Wini Braga	6 ft 9 in (2.06 m)	200 lb (91 kg)	Fr	Minas	Belo Horizonte, Brazil
C	24	Lathan Sommerville	6 ft 10 in (2.08 m)	275 lb (125 kg)	So	Rutgers	Peoria, IL
F	33	Nikola Džepina	6 ft 10 in (2.08 m)	200 lb (91 kg)	So	Valencia Basket	Belgrade, Serbia

Head coach

- Danny Sprinkle (Montana State)

Assistant coach(es)

- Andy Hill (Eastern Washington)
- DeAndre Haynes (Kent State)
- Mike Mennenga (Morehead State)
- Abdul Gaddy (Washington)
- Charles Klask (Michigan State)

Legend

- (C) Team captain
- (S) Suspended
- (I) Ineligible
- (W) Walk-on
- Injured
- Current redshirt

Roster

== Schedule and results ==
For the first time in 110 years, the rivalry game against Washington State was not played in the regular season. Instead, the two sides met in an exhibition game in October. Additionally, the Huskies did not play Seattle in the regular season for the first time since the Redhawks rejoined Division I in 2008.

Date time, TV	Rank^{#}	Opponent^{#}	Result	Record	High points	High rebounds	High assists	Site (attendance) city, state
Exhibition
October 17, 2026*; 6:00 p.m.		at Boise State	L 91–109		16 – Tied	9 – Watts	3 – Tied	ExtraMile Arena (2,137); Boise, ID
October 25, 2026*; 1:00 p.m., B1G+		Washington State; Rivalry	L 80–84		28 – Watts	12 – Džepina	5 – Comer	Alaska Airlines Arena (7,011); Seattle, WA
Regular season
November 2, 2026*; 7:00 p.m., B1G+		Colgate	W 90–76	1–0	27 – Džepina	7 – Džepina	4 – Beasley	Alaska Airlines Arena; Seattle, WA
November 9, 2026*; 7:00 p.m., BTN		Mississippi Valley State	W 77–64	2–0	17 – Friedrichsen	10 – Tied	6 – Beasley	Alaska Airlines Arena (4,778); Seattle, WA
November 14, 2026*; 4:00 p.m., ESPN+		at Utah	Postponed due to the FAA nationwide ground stop, makeup on December 5					Jon M. Huntsman Center; Salt Lake City, UT
November 17, 2026*; 7:00 p.m., B1G+		Simon Fraser (Note: The game was added following the postponment of the Utah game.)	W 96–59	3–0	17 – Watts	11 – Braga	5 – Tied	Alaska Airlines Arena (3,488); Seattle, WA
November 19, 2026*; 6:00 p.m., B1G+		Utah Tech	W 82–69	4–0	35 – Venters	11 – Sommerville	5 – Tied	Alaska Airlines Arena (5,066); Seattle, WA
November 23, 2026*; 2:00 p.m., ESPN2		vs. BYU; Maui Invitational First round						Lahaina Civic Center; Lahaina, HI
November 24, 2026*; TBD, ESPN/ESPN2		vs. Clemson / Ole Miss; Maui Invitational						Lahaina Civic Center; Lahaina, HI
November 25, 2026*; TBD, ESPN/ESPN2		vs. Arizona / Colorado State / Providence / VCU; Maui Invitational						Lahaina Civic Center; Lahaina, HI
November 29, 2026*; 4:30 p.m., BTN		Norfolk State						Alaska Airlines Arena; Seattle, WA
December 2, 2026; 7:30 p.m., BTN		at USC						Galen Center; Los Angeles, CA
December 5, 2026*; TBD, ESPN+		at Utah						Jon M. Huntsman Center; Salt Lake City, UT
December 8, 2026*; 7:00 p.m., BTN		Southern Utah						Alaska Airlines Arena; Seattle, WA
December 13, 2026; 5:00 p.m., BTN		UCLA						Alaska Airlines Arena; Seattle, WA
December 19, 2026*; 7:00 p.m., FS1		vs. Baylor; Seattle Holiday Classic						Climate Pledge Arena; Seattle, WA
December 28, 2026; 7:00 p.m., Peacock / NBCSN		Cornell						Alaska Airlines Arena; Seattle, WA
January 2, 2027; 11:00 a.m., FOX		at Michigan						Crisler Center; Ann Arbor, MI
January 5, 2027; 3:30 p.m., FS1		at Michigan State						Breslin Center; East Lansing, MI
January 9, 2027; 12:00 p.m., Peacock / NBCSN		Indiana						Alaska Airlines Arena; Seattle, WA
January 13, 2027; 8:00 p.m., BTN		Nebraska						Alaska Airlines Arena; Seattle, WA
January 16, 2027; 12:00 p.m., BTN		at UCLA						Pauley Pavilion; Los Angeles, CA
January 20, 2027; 7:30 p.m., BTN		Northwestern						Alaska Airlines Arena; Seattle, WA
January 23, 2027; 11:00 a.m., BTN		at Wisconsin						Kohl Center; Madison, WI
January 26, 2027; 6:00 p.m., BTN		at Minnesota						Williams Arena; Minneapolis, MN
January 30, 2027; 1:00 p.m., BTN		Rutgers						Alaska Airlines Arena; Seattle, WA
February 7, 2027; 1:30 p.m., FS1		at Oregon						Matthew Knight Arena; Eugene, OR
February 10, 2027; 7:30 p.m., BTN		USC						Alaska Airlines Arena; Seattle, WA
February 14, 2027; 10:00 a.m., FS1		at Ohio State						Value City Arena; Columbus, OH
February 17, 2027; 4:00 p.m., BTN		at Penn State						Bryce Jordan Center; State College, PA
February 20, 2027; 2:00 p.m., Peacock		Maryland						Alaska Airlines Arena; Seattle, WA
February 23, 2027; 7:00 p.m., FS1		Illinois						Alaska Airlines Arena; Seattle, WA
February 27, 2027; 5:30 p.m., BTN		Purdue						Alaska Airlines Arena; Seattle, WA
March 2, 2027; 4:00 p.m., BTN		at Iowa						Carver–Hawkeye Arena; Iowa City, IA
March 6, 2027; 7:00 p.m., FS1		Oregon						Alaska Airlines Arena; Seattle, WA
*Non-conference game. ^{#}Rankings from AP Poll. (#) Tournament seedings in parentheses. All times are in Pacific Time.
