= 2026–27 Maryland Terrapins men's basketball team =

American basketball team

2026–27 Maryland Terrapins men's basketball
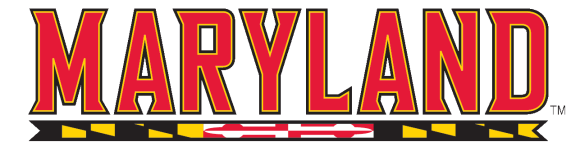
- Conference: Big Ten Conference
- Record: 3–2 (0–0 Big Ten)
- Head coach: Buzz Williams (2nd season)
- Associate head coach: Devin Johnson
- Assistant coaches: Lyle Wolf; Steve Roccaforte; Wabissa Bede; Aki Collins
- Home arena: Xfinity Center

2026–27 Big Ten Conference men's basketball standings
	Conf.				Overall
Team	W		L	PCT	W		L	PCT
Indiana	0	–	0	–	6	–	0	1.000
Minnesota	0	–	0	–	6	–	0	1.000
No. 24 Nebraska	0	–	0	–	5	–	0	1.000
No. 7 UCLA	0	–	0	–	5	–	0	1.000
No. 18т USC	0	–	0	–	5	–	0	1.000
Washington	0	–	0	–	4	–	0	1.000
No. 10 Illinois	0	–	0	–	5	–	1	.833
Penn State	0	–	0	–	5	–	1	.833
No. 2 Michigan State	0	–	0	–	4	–	1	.800
No. 18т Michigan	0	–	0	–	3	–	1	.750
Oregon	0	–	0	–	3	–	1	.750
Ohio State	0	–	0	–	4	–	2	.667
Purdue	0	–	0	–	4	–	2	.667
Rutgers	0	–	0	–	4	–	2	.667
Wisconsin	0	–	0	–	4	–	2	.667
Iowa	0	–	0	–	3	–	2	.600
Maryland	0	–	0	–	3	–	2	.600
Northwestern	0	–	0	–	3	–	3	.500
† 2027 Big Ten tournament winner As of November 21, 2026; Rankings from AP poll

The 2026–27 Maryland Terrapins men's basketball team represents the University of Maryland, College Park during the 2026–27 NCAA Division I men's basketball season. The Terrapins, led by second-year head coach Buzz Williams, play their home games at Xfinity Center in College Park, Maryland, as a member of the Big Ten Conference.

== Previous season ==
The Terrapins finished the 2025–26 season 12–21, 4–16 in Big Ten play to finish in seventeenth place. As the No. 17 seed in the Big Ten tournament, they beat Oregon in the first round, before losing to Iowa in the second round. The Terrapins did not receive a bid to any postseason tournaments following the year.

== Offseason ==
=== Departures ===
Maryland departures
Name	Number	Pos.	Height	Weight	Year	Hometown	Reason for departure
Darius Adams	1	G	6'5"	175	Freshman	Manchester, NJ	Transferred to NC State
Myles Rice	2	G	6'3"	185	(redshirt) Junior	Columbia, SC	Transferred to TBD
Rakease Passmore	4	G	6'5"	195	Sophomore	Palatka, FL	Transferred to TBD
David Coit	8	G	5'11"	180	Graduate Student	Columbus, NJ	Graduated
Solomon Washington	9	F	6'7"	220	Senior	New Orleans, LA	Graduated/undrafted in 2026 NBA draft; signed with the New Orleans Pelicans as an undrafted free agent.
Isaiah Watts	12	G	6'3"	180	Junior	West Seattle, Washington	Transferred to UTSA
Elijah Saunders	13	F	6'8"	240	Senior	Phoenix, AZ	Graduated; entered transfer portal
Jaziah Harper	15	G/F	6'7"	190	Freshman	Oak Park, IL	Transferred to North Dakota State
Aleks Alston	24	F	6'10"	220	Freshman	Chicago, IL	Transferred to UAB
Nick Blake (W)	25	G	6'2"	180	Freshman	Orlando, FL	Transferred to West Virginia Wesleyan
Collin Metcalf	45	C	6'9"	240	Senior	Nortorf, Germany	Graduated

=== Incoming transfers ===
Maryland incoming transfers
Name	Number	Pos.	Height	Weight	Year	Hometown	Previous school
D. J. Wagner	2	G	6'4"	195	Senior	Camden, NJ	Arkansas
Maban Jabriel	9	F	6'9"	205	Junior	Waterloo, Ontario	Queens (NC)
Bishop Boswell	12	G	6'4"	205	Junior	Charlotte, NC	Tennessee
Michael McNair	20	G	6'5"	185	GS Senior	Temecula, CA	Boston University
Tomislav Buljan	23	F	6'9"	250	Sophomore	Split, Croatia	New Mexico
Alex K'Medehouto	24	C	7'0"	235	Junior	Lome, Togo	South Plains College
Robert Jennings II	25	F	6'7"	230	GS Senior	DeSoto, TX	Oklahoma State

=== Recruiting classes ===
==== 2026 recruiting class ====
College recruiting
Name	Hometown	School	Height	Weight	Commit date
Baba Oladotun #4 SF	Silver Spring, MD	James Hubert Blake High School	6 ft 10 in (2.08 m)	190 lb (86 kg)	Nov 19, 2025
Baba Oladotun #4 SF	Recruit ratings: Rivals: 247Sports: ESPN: (93)				
Kaden House #5 SG	Phoenix, AZ	Arizona Compass Preparatory School	6 ft 3 in (1.91 m)	170 lb (77 kg)	Oct 31, 2025
Kaden House #5 SG	Recruit ratings: Rivals: 247Sports: ESPN: (87)				
Adama Tambedou #15 PF	Springfield, MA	Putnam Science Academy	6 ft 8 in (2.03 m)	230 lb (100 kg)	Sep 23, 2025
Adama Tambedou #15 PF	Recruit ratings: Rivals: 247Sports: ESPN: (81)				
Austin Brown; SG	Lufkin, TX	Lufkin High School	6 ft 8 in (2.03 m)	200 lb (91 kg)	Jun 30, 2025
Austin Brown; SG	Recruit ratings: Rivals: 247Sports: ESPN: (81)				
Overall recruit ranking: Rivals: 11 247Sports: 14 ESPN: 14
Note: In many cases, Scout, Rivals, 247Sports, On3, and ESPN may conflict in their listings of height and weight.; In these cases, the average was taken. ESPN grades are on a 100-point scale.; Sources: "Maryland 2026 Basketball Commitments". Rivals.; "2026 Maryland Terrapins Recruiting Class". ESPN.; "2026 Team Ranking". Rivals.

Big Ten Preseason Media Poll

	Big Ten Media	Points
1.	Illinois	498 (18)
2.	Michigan State	483 (9)
3.	Michigan	436 (1)
4.	UCLA	375
5.	Nebraska	369
6.	Purdue	347
7.	USC	340
8.	Ohio State	324
9.	Indiana	292
10.	Iowa	264
11.	Wisconsin	240
12.	Maryland	203
13.	Minnesota	168
14.	Oregon	147
15.	Washington	116
16.	Northwestern	88
17.	Rutgers	68
18.	Penn State	35
Reference: (#) first-place votes

== Roster ==
2026–27 Maryland Terrapins men's basketball team
Players
Coaches

Pos.	#	Name	Height	Weight	Year	Previous school	Hometown
F	1	Austin Brown	6 ft 8 in (2.03 m)	200 lb (91 kg)	Fr	Lufkin	Lufkin, TX
G	2	D.J. Wagner	6 ft 4 in (1.93 m)	190 lb (86 kg)	Sr	Arkansas	Camden, NJ
G	7	Andre Mills	6 ft 4 in (1.93 m)	205 lb (93 kg)	RS So	Texas A&M	Boston, MA
G	8	Kaden House	6 ft 3 in (1.91 m)	175 lb (79 kg)	Fr	Arizona Compass Prep	Phoenix, AZ
G	9	Maban Jabriel	6 ft 9 in (2.06 m)	205 lb (93 kg)	Jr	Queens (NC)	Waterloo, Ontario
F	10	Baba Oladotun	6 ft 10 in (2.08 m)	195 lb (88 kg)	Fr	James Hubert Blake	Silver Spring, MD
G/F	11	George Turkson Jr.	6 ft 7 in (2.01 m)	220 lb (100 kg)	RS So	Texas A&M	Lowell, MA
G	12	Bishop Boswell	6 ft 4 in (1.93 m)	204 lb (93 kg)	Jr	Tennessee	Charlotte, NC
F	14	Adama Tambedou	6 ft 7 in (2.01 m)	230 lb (104 kg)	Fr	Putnam Science Academy	Springfield, MA
G	18	Guillermo Del Pino	6 ft 5 in (1.96 m)	183 lb (83 kg)	So	Unicaja Malaga Academy	Córdoba, Spain
G	20	Michael McNair	6 ft 5 in (1.96 m)	200 lb (91 kg)	GS	Boston University	Temecula, CA
F/C	21	Pharrel Payne	6 ft 9 in (2.06 m)	250 lb (113 kg)	RS Sr	Texas A&M	Cottage Grove, MN
F	23	Tomislav Buljan	6 ft 9 in (2.06 m)	250 lb (113 kg)	So	New Mexico	Split, Croatia
C	24	Alex K’Medehouto	7 ft 0 in (2.13 m)	235 lb (107 kg)	Jr	South Plains College	Lomé, Togo
F	25	Robert Jennings II	6 ft 7 in (2.01 m)	230 lb (104 kg)	GS	Oklahoma State	Desoto, TX
G	30	Lukas Sotell (W)	6 ft 3 in (1.91 m)	180 lb (82 kg)	Sr	Montverde Academy	Stamford, CT

Head coach

- Buzz Williams (Oklahoma City)

Assistant coach(es)

- Devin Johnson (LSU New Orleans)
- Lyle Wolf (Transylvania)
- Steve Roccaforte (Lamar)
- Wabissa Bede (Virginia Tech)
- Aki Collins (Clark Atlanta)

Legend

- (C) Team captain
- (S) Suspended
- (I) Ineligible
- (W) Walk-on
- Injured
- Current redshirt

Roster

== Schedule and results ==
Date time, TV	Rank^{#}	Opponent^{#}	Result	Record	High points	High rebounds	High assists	Site (attendance) city, state
Exhibition
October 11, 2026*; 4:30 p.m., B1G+		vs. Georgia Tech	W 85–70	—	16 – Payne	9 – Payne	3 – Tied	Chesapeake Employers Insurance Arena (2,265); Baltimore, MD
October 18, 2026*; 3:00 p.m., B1G+		West Virginia	W 90–81 ^{OT}	—	27 – Mills	13 – Payne	4 – Tied	Xfinity Center (10,047); College Park, MD
Regular season
November 2, 2026*; 7:00 p.m., B1G+		Bucknell	W 96–67	1–0	22 – Mills	11 – Mills	3 – Wagner	Xfinity Center (12,023); College Park, MD
November 7, 2026*; 7:30 p.m., Peacock		at Georgetown	L 74–86	1–1	28 – Payne	10 – Buljan	3 – Wagner	Capital One Arena (14,739); Washington, D.C.
November 13, 2026*; 8:00 p.m., NBCSN/Peacock		No. 6 Virginia	L 83–87	1–2	20 – Payne	6 – Buijan	5 – Wagner	Xfinity Center (16,908); College Park, MD
November 16, 2026*; 6:00 p.m., BTN		Alcorn State	W 117–57	2–2	16 – House	10 – Buljan	6 – House	Xfinity Center (8,933); College Park, MD
November 20, 2026*; 7:00 p.m., B1G+		Wagner	W 62–45	3–2	25 – Payne	13 – Payne	4 – Wagner	Xfinity Center (10,701); College Park, MD
November 24, 2026*; 3:00 p.m., ESPN		vs. Tennessee; Players Era Festival 16 – Bracket 1 First round						Michelob Ultra Arena; Paradise, NV
November 26, 2026*; ESPN Networks		vs. Iowa State/San Diego State; Players Era Festival 16						Michelob Ultra Arena; Paradise, NV
November 27, 2026*; ESPN Networks		vs. Players Era Festival 16						MGM Grand Garden Arena; Paradise, NV
December 2, 2026*; 7:00 p.m., B1G+		American						Xfinity Center; College Park, MD
December 6, 2026; 12:00 p.m., BTN		at Ohio State						Value City Arena; Columbus, OH
December 9, 2026; 8:30 p.m., BTN		Michigan State						Xfinity Center; College Park, MD
December 15, 2026*; 8:00 p.m., BTN		Morgan State						Xfinity Center; College Park, MD
December 19, 2026*; 1:00 p.m., FS1		vs. South Carolina						CFG Bank Arena; Baltimore, MD
December 29, 2026*; 6:30 p.m., BTN		Radford						Xfinity Center; College Park, MD
January 2, 2027; 6:00 p.m., FS1		UCLA						Xfinity Center; College Park, MD
January 5, 2027; 8:00 p.m., BTN		USC						Xfinity Center; College Park, MD
January 9, 2027; 6:00 p.m., FS1		at Iowa						Carver–Hawkeye Arena; Iowa City, IA
January 12, 2027; 6:00 p.m., FS1		at Indiana						Simon Skjodt Assembly Hall; Bloomington, IN
January 16, 2027; 2:00 p.m., NBCSN/Peacock		Illinois						Xfinity Center; College Park, MD
January 19, 2027; 7:00 p.m., BTN		Rutgers						Xfinity Center; College Park, MD
January 23, 2027; 12:00 p.m., FS1		at Purdue						Mackey Arena; West Lafayette, IN
January 26, 2027; 7:00 p.m., Peacock		Wisconsin						Xfinity Center; College Park, MD
January 30, 2027; 12:00 p.m., BTN		at Penn State						Bryce Jordan Center; State College, PA
February 2, 2027; 7:00 p.m., NBCSN/Peacock		at Michigan State						Breslin Center; East Lansing, MI
February 9, 2027; 6:30 p.m., FS1		Nebraska						Xfinity Center; College Park, MD
February 13, 2027; 12:00 p.m., FOX		Indiana						Xfinity Center; College Park, MD
February 17, 2027; 9:00 p.m., BTN		at Oregon						Matthew Knight Arena; Eugene, OR
February 20, 2027; 5:00 p.m., Peacock		at Washington						Alaska Airlines Arena; Seattle, WA
February 24, 2027; 6:30 p.m., BTN		Minnesota						Xfinity Center; College Park, MD
February 28, 2027; 5:00 p.m., NBCSN/Peacock		at Rutgers						Jersey Mike's Arena; Piscataway, NJ
March 4, 2027; 6:30 p.m., FS1		at Michigan						Crisler Center; Ann Arbor, MI
March 7, 2027; 1:00 p.m., BTN		Northwestern						Xfinity Center; College Park, MD
Big Ten Tournament
*Non-conference game. ^{#}Rankings from AP Poll. (#) Tournament seedings in parentheses. All times are in Eastern Time.
