= Anthony Thompson (basketball) =

American basketball player (born 2008)

No. 6 – Ohio State Buckeyes
- Position: Small forward
- Conference: Big Ten Conference

Personal information
- Born: August 9, 2008 (age 18)
- Listed height: 6 ft 9 in (2.06 m)
- Listed weight: 215 lb (98 kg)

Career information
- High school: Lebanon (Lebanon, Ohio); Western Reserve Academy (Hudson, Ohio)
- College: Ohio State (2026–present)

Career highlights
- McDonald's All-American (2026)

Anthony Thompson (born August 9, 2008) is an American college basketball player for the Ohio State Buckeyes of the Big Ten Conference. He was a five-star prospect and one of the top recruits in the class of 2026.

== Early life ==
Thompson is from Lebanon, Ohio. He attended Lebanon High School where he played basketball, earning first-team all-conference and honorable mention all-state honors as a sophomore when he averaged 15.8 points and 8.1 rebounds per game. He then transferred to Western Reserve Academy in Hudson, Ohio, for his junior season, averaging 22 points per game that year. He also participated in the Adidas 3SSB circuit in 2025, averaging 22.8 points and 5.7 rebounds while making 59% of his shots from the field and finishing first in the league in scoring.

A five-star recruit, Thompson is ranked one of the top-15 prospects nationally in the class of 2026. He is ranked the number two small forward as well as the best prospect in Ohio by 247Sports. Thompson committed to play college basketball for the Ohio State Buckeyes, becoming the school's highest-ranked basketball commit since Jared Sullinger in 2010.
