= 2026–27 USC Trojans men's basketball team =

American college basketball season

2026–27 USC Trojans men's basketball
- Conference: Big Ten Conference

Ranking
- Coaches: No. 22
- AP: No. 18т
- Record: 5–0 (0–0 Big Ten)
- Head coach: Eric Musselman (3rd season)
- Assistant coaches: Will Conroy (3rd season); Michael Musselman (3rd season); Anthony Ruta (3rd season); Earl Boykins (2nd season)
- Home arena: Galen Center (Capacity: 10,258)

2026–27 Big Ten Conference men's basketball standings
	Conf.				Overall
Team	W		L	PCT	W		L	PCT
Indiana	0	–	0	–	5	–	0	1.000
Minnesota	0	–	0	–	5	–	0	1.000
No. 24 Nebraska	0	–	0	–	5	–	0	1.000
No. 7 UCLA	0	–	0	–	5	–	0	1.000
No. 18т USC	0	–	0	–	5	–	0	1.000
Washington	0	–	0	–	4	–	0	1.000
Penn State	0	–	0	–	5	–	1	.833
No. 10 Illinois	0	–	0	–	4	–	1	.800
No. 2 Michigan State	0	–	0	–	4	–	1	.800
Wisconsin	0	–	0	–	4	–	1	.800
No. 18т Michigan	0	–	0	–	3	–	1	.750
Oregon	0	–	0	–	3	–	1	.750
Ohio State	0	–	0	–	4	–	2	.667
Rutgers	0	–	0	–	4	–	2	.667
Northwestern	0	–	0	–	3	–	2	.600
Purdue	0	–	0	–	3	–	2	.600
Iowa	0	–	0	–	2	–	2	.500
Maryland	0	–	0	–	2	–	2	.500
† 2027 Big Ten tournament winner As of November 20, 2026; Rankings from AP poll

The 2026–27 USC Trojans men's basketball team will represent the University of Southern California (USC) during the 2026-27 NCAA Division I men's basketball season. The Trojans will be led by third-year head coach Eric Musselman, and play their home games at the Galen Center for the 20th season in Los Angeles, California as a third-year member of the Big Ten Conference (B1G).

== Previous season ==
The Trojans finished the 2025-26 season 18–14, 7–13 in Big Ten play to finish in a tie for 12th place with (Washington). As the 13th seed in the Big Ten Tournement, they would lose to Washington 83-79 in Overtime in the Second Round.

== Offseason ==
=== Departures ===
USC departures
Name	Number	Pos.	Height	Weight	Year	Hometown	Reason for departure
Ezra Ausar	2	F	6'9"	253	Senior	Atlanta, GA	Graduated
Amarion Dickerson	3	G/F	6'7"	197	Senior	Cleveland, OH	Transferred to Grand Canyon
Chad Baker-Mazara	4	G/F	6'7"	172	Graduate Senior	Santo Domingo, Dominican Republic	Graduated; signed with the Mexico City Capitanes
Terrance Williams II	5	F	6'7"	235	Graduate Senior	Clinton, MD	Graduated
Jordan Marsh	7	G	5'11"	146	Junior	Monroe, NC	Transferred to Temple
Jerry Easter II	8	G	6'5"	193	Freshman	Toledo, OH	Transferred to Oregon
Ryan Cornish	9	G	6'5"	173	Graduate Student	Potomac, MD	Graduated
EJ Neal Jr.	12	G	6'5"	200	Graduate Student	San Francisco, CA	Graduated
Kam Woods	13	G	6'2"	185	Graduate Student	Bessemer, AL	Graduated
Patrick O'Brien	18	G	6'5"	204	Freshman	San Diego, CA	Transferred to Bucknell
Jonah Goorin	21	G	6'4"	177	Sophomore	San Francisco, CA	Left team
Brit Burden	22	F	6'7"	210	Sophomore	Piedmont, CA	Left team
Jaden Brownell	33	F	6'10"	235	Graduate Student	Sandy, UT	Graduated
Gabe Dynes	45	C	7'5"	214	Junior	Independence, KY	Transferred to Louisville

=== Incoming transfers ===
USC incoming transfers
Name	Number	Pos.	Height	Weight	Year	Hometown	Previous school
KJ Lewis	2	G	6'4"	210	Senior	Midland, TX	Georgetown
Isaac Bruns	4	G	6'5"	190	Senior	North Sioux City, SD	South Dakota
Jalen Cox	8	G	6'3"	180	Senior	View Park, CA	Colgate
Eric Reibe	12	C	7'1"	260	Sophomore	Hanover, Germany	UConn
Jadis Jones	20	G	6'5"	180	Junior	New Madrid, MO	Lindenwood
Joshua Hughes	22	F	6'10"	224	Senior	Brisbane, Australia	Evansville
Aaron Hunkin-Claytor	30	G	6'3"	175	Junior	Wahiawa, Oahu, HI	Hawaii

=== Recruiting class ===
College recruiting (2026)
Name	Hometown	School	Height	Weight	Commit date
			N/A	N/A	
Recruit ratings: No ratings found
Overall recruit ranking:
Note: In many cases, Scout, Rivals, 247Sports, On3, and ESPN may conflict in their listings of height and weight.; In these cases, the average was taken. ESPN grades are on a 100-point scale.; Sources: "2026 USC Commits". Rivals.; "ESPN- USC Trojans Men's Basketball Recruiting". ESPN.; "2026 Team Ranking". Rivals.

== Roster ==
2026–27 USC Trojans men's basketball team
Players
Coaches

Pos.	#	Name	Height	Weight	Year	Previous school	Hometown
G	0	Alijah Arenas	6 ft 7 in (2.01 m)	199 lb (90 kg)	So	Chatsworth High School	Woodland Hills, California
G	1	Rodney Rice	6 ft 5 in (1.96 m)	199 lb (90 kg)	Sr	Maryland	Takoma Park, Maryland
G	2	KJ Lewis	6 ft 4 in (1.93 m)	210 lb (95 kg)	Sr	Georgetown	Midland, Texas
F	3	Adonis Ratliff	6 ft 11 in (2.11 m)	—	Fr	Archbishop Stepinac High School	Atlanta, Georgia
G	4	Isaac Bruns	6 ft 5 in (1.96 m)	—	Sr	South Dakota	North Sioux City, South Dakota
F	5	Jacob Cofie	6 ft 10 in (2.08 m)	231 lb (105 kg)	Jr	Virginia	Seattle, Washington
F	7	Christian Collins	6 ft 9 in (2.06 m)	200 lb (91 kg)	Fr	St. John Bosco High School	Inglewood, California
G	8	Jalen Cox	6 ft 3 in (1.91 m)	180 lb (82 kg)	Sr	Colgate	View Park, California
C	12	Eric Reibe	7 ft 1 in (2.16 m)	260 lb (118 kg)	So	UConn	Honover, Germany
C	13	Darius Ratliff	7 ft 0 in (2.13 m)	—	Fr	Archbishop Stepinac High School	Atlanta, Georgia
G	20	Jadis Jones	6 ft 5 in (1.96 m)	180 lb (82 kg)	Jr	Lindenwood	New Madrid, Missouri
F	22	Joshua Hughes	6 ft 10 in (2.08 m)	—	Sr	Evansville	Brisbane, Australia
G	30	Aaron Hunkin-Claytor	6 ft 3 in (1.91 m)	175 lb (79 kg)	Jr	Hawaii	Wahiawā, Hawaii
C	33	Onyeka Joe Agu	6 ft 10 in (2.08 m)	—	Fr	Brussels	Herent, Belgium

Head coach

- Eric Musselman (San Diego)

Assistant coach(es)

- Will Conroy (Washington)
- Michael Musselman (San Diego)
- Anthony Ruta (Arizona State)
- Earl Boykins (Eastern Michigan)

Legend

- (C) Team captain
- (S) Suspended
- (I) Ineligible
- (W) Walk-on
- Injured
- Current redshirt

Roster
Last update: August 31, 2026

== Schedule and results ==
Date time, TV	Rank^{#}	Opponent^{#}	Result	Record	High points	High rebounds	High assists	Site (attendance) city, state
Exhibition
October 9, 2026*; 4:00 p.m., ACCN		vs. North Carolina	L 70–88	–	22 – Rodney Rice	7 – Jacob Cofie	5 – Rodney Rice	First Horizon Coliseum (7,892); Greensboro, North Carolina
October 17, 2026*; 7:00 p.m., ESPN+		at UC San Diego	W 80–74	–	26 – Rodney Rice	10 – Jacob Cofie	5 – Rodney Rice	LionTree Arena (4,000); La Jolla, California
October 23, 2026*; 7:00 p.m.	No. 21	at San Diego State	W 85–68	–	23 – Rodney Rice	12 – Alijah Arenas	5 – Tied	Viejas Arena (8,687); San Diego, California
Non-Conference Regular Season
November 2, 2026*; 7:30 p.m., B1G+	No. 21	Milwaukee	W 95–63	1–0	25 – Adonis Ratliff	8 – Alijah Arenas	9 – Rodney Rice	Galen Center (4,559); Los Angeles, California
November 8, 2026*; 8:00 p.m., The CW	No. 21	vs. Wichita State; Caesars Lake Tahoe Classic	W 93–86	2–0	32 – Rodney Rice	13 – Adonis Ratliff	9 – Rodney Rice	Tahoe Blue Event Center (2,845); Stateline, Nevada
November 11, 2026*; 8:00 p.m., ESPN2	No. 21	at California	W 77–65	3–0	19 – Alijah Arenas	15 – Jacob Cofie	6 – Jacob Cofie	Haas Pavilion (5,087); Berkeley, California
November 15, 2026*; 4:00 p.m., B1G+	No. 21	Arkansas–Pine Bluff	W 122–46	4–0	21 – Alijah Arenas	8 – Adonis Ratliff	6 – Tied	Galen Center (2,564); Los Angeles, California
November 19, 2026*; 8:00 p.m., BTN	No. 18т	Tarleton State	W 96–51	5–0	24 – Rodney Rice	9 – Darius Ratliff	7 – Rodney Rice	Galen Center (2,782); Los Angeles, California
November 22, 2026*; 5:00 p.m., B1G+	No. 18т	Louisiana						Galen Center; Los Angeles, California
November 25, 2026*; 1:30 p.m., CBSSN		vs. South Carolina; Acrisure Series Pod 1						Acrisure Arena; Palm Desert, California
November 26, 2026*; 1:30 p.m., CBSSN		vs. Utah State; Acrisure Series Pod 1						Acrisure Arena; Palm Desert, California
December 2, 2026; 7:30 p.m., BTN		Washington						Galen Center; Los Angeles, California
December 5, 2026; 1:00 p.m., BTN		at Oregon						Matthew Knight Arena; Eugene, Oregon
December 8, 2026*; 6:30 p.m., ESPN+		at San Diego						Jenny Craig Pavilion; San Diego, California
December 13, 2026*; 11:00 a.m., ESPN2		vs. Texas Tech; US LBM Coast-to-Coast Challenge						Dickies Arena; Fort Worth, Texas
December 19, 2026*; 1:30 p.m., Peacock		Jacksonville						Galen Center; Los Angeles, California
December 22, 2026*; 7:00 p.m., BTN		Western Michigan						Galen Center; Los Angeles, California
December 30, 2026; 3:00 p.m., BTN		at Purdue						Mackey Arena; West Lafayette, Indiana
January 2, 2027; 11:00 a.m., NBCSN/Peacock		at Indiana						Simon Skjodt Assembly Hall; Bloomington, Indiana
January 5, 2027; 5:00 p.m., BTN		at Maryland						XFINITY Center; College Park, Maryland
January 8, 2027; 4:00 p.m., FS1		at Rutgers						Jersey Mike's Arena; Piscataway, New Jersey
January 12, 2027; 7:00 p.m., NBCSN/Peacock		Michigan State						Galen Center; Los Angeles, California
January 16, 2027; 3:00 p.m., FS1		Wisconsin						Galen Center; Los Angeles, California
January 23, 2027; 12:00 p.m., NBC		Michigan						Galen Center; Los Angeles, California
January 27, 2027; 6:00 p.m., BTN		at Illinois						State Farm Center; Champaign, Illinois
January 30, 2027; 11:00 a.m., BTN		at Northwestern						Welsh-Ryan Arena; Evanston, Illinois
February 3, 2027; 7:30 p.m., BTN		Iowa						Galen Center; Los Angeles, California
February 6, 2027; 1:00 p.m., FS1		Minnesota						Galen Center; Los Angeles, California
February 10, 2027; 7:30 p.m., BTN		at Washington						Alaska Airlines Arena; Seattle, Washington
February 13, 2027; 2:30 p.m., FOX		UCLA; Rivalry						Galen Center; Los Angeles, California
February 20, 2027; 12:00 p.m., NBC		Ohio State						Galen Center; Los Angeles, California
February 23, 2027; 3:00 p.m., NBCSN/Peacock		at Nebraska						Pinnacle Bank Arena; Lincoln, Nebraska
February 27, 2027; 3:00 p.m., FS1		Oregon						Galen Center; Los Angeles, California
March 2, 2027; 6:00 p.m., BTN		Penn State; Senior Day or Night						Galen Center; Los Angeles, California
March 6, 2027; 2:30 p.m., FOX		at UCLA; Rivalry						Pauley Pavilion; Los Angeles, California
Big Ten tournament
March 10-14, 2026; TBD, TBD		vs. TBD; Big Ten Tournament						Gainbridge Fieldhouse; Indianapolis, Indiana
*Non-conference game. ^{#}Rankings from AP Poll. (#) Tournament seedings in parentheses. All times are in Pacific Time.

== Game summaries ==
This section will be filled in as the season progresses.

=== Exhibition ===
==== vs North Carolina (The Preseason Premiere) ====
ACCN

October 9, 2026
4:00 p.m. PST

Recap

USC Trojans 70, North Carolina Tar Heels 88
Scoring by half: 39–37, 21–51
Pts: Rodney Rice - 22; Rebs: Jacob Cofie - 7 Asts: Rodney Rice - 5	Pts: Jarin Stevenson - 25; Rebs: Jarin Stevenson - 10; Asts: Neo Avdalas - 5

First Horizon Coliseum • Greensboro, North Carolina
Attendance: 7,892
Referees: Earl Walton, Brian O'Connell, Pat Driscoll

==== at UC San Diego ====
ESPN+

October 17, 2026
7:00 p.m. PST

Recap

USC Trojans 80, UC San Diego Tritons 74
Scoring by half: 40–38, 40–36
Pts: Rodney Rice - 26; Rebs: Jacob Cofie - 10; Asts: Rodney Rice - 5	Pts: Treysen Eaglestaff - 29; Rebs: Treysen Eaglestaff - 7 Asts: Tied - 2

LionTree Arena • La Jolla, California
Attendance: 4,000
Referees: Akin Moss, Michael Mojica, Mike Greenstein

==== at San Diego State ====
October 23, 2026
7:00 p.m. PST

Recap

No. 21 USC Trojans 85, San Diego State Aztecs 68
Scoring by half: 51–31, 34–37
Pts: Rodney Rice - 23; Rebs: Alijah Arenas - 12; Asts: Tied - 5	Pts: Elzie Harrington - 19; Rebs: Latrell Davis - 5 Asts: Tied - 4

Viejas Arena • San Diego, California
Attendance: 8,687
Referees: Christopher Merlo, Antonio Petty, Tony Padilla

=== Regular season ===
==== Milwaukee ====
BTN+

November 2, 2026
7:30 p.m. PST

Recap

Milwaukee Panthers 63, No. 21 USC Trojans 93
Scoring by half: 29–46, 34–49
Pts: Amare Hereford - 14; Rebs: Tied - 5 Asts: Chandler Jackson - 3	Pts: Adonis Ratliff - 25; Rebs: Alijah Arenas - 8 Asts: Rodney Rice - 9

Galen Center • Los Angeles, California
Attendance: 4,559
Referees: Daryl Gelinas, Crystal Hogan, Randy Richardson

==== vs Wichita State (Caesars Lake Tahoe Classic) ====
The CW

November 8, 2026
8:00 p.m. PST

Recap

Wichita State Shockers 86, No. 21 USC Trojans 93
Scoring by half: 45–43, 41–50
Pts: Michael Gray Jr. - 18; Rebs: William Berg - 11; Asts: Jordan Frison - 6	Pts: Rodney Rice - 32; Rebs: Adonis Ratliff - 13; Asts: Rodney Rice - 9

Tahoe Blue Event Center • Stateline, Nevada
Attendance: 2,845

==== at California ====
ESPN2

November 11, 2026
8:00 p.m. PST

No. 21 USC Trojans vs. California Golden Bears
Scoring by half: –, –

Haas Pavilion • Berkeley, California

==== Arkansas-Pine Bluff ====
BTN+

November 15, 2026
4:00 p.m. PST

Arkansas-Pine Bluff Golden Lions vs. No. 21 USC Trojans
Scoring by half: –, –

Galen Center • Los Angeles, California

==== Tarleton State ====
BTN

November 19, 2026
8:00 p.m. PST

Tarleton State Texans vs. USC Trojans
Scoring by half: –, –

Galen Center • Los Angeles, California

==== Louisiana ====
BTN+

November 22, 2026
5:00 p.m. PST

Louisiana Ragin' Cajuns vs. USC Trojans
Scoring by half: –, –

Galen Center • Los Angeles, California

==== South Carolina (Acrisure Series) ====
CBSSN

November 25, 2026
1:30 p.m. PST

South Carolina Gamecocks vs. USC Trojans
Scoring by half: –, –

Acrisure Arena • Palm Desert, California

==== Utah State (Acrisure Series) ====
CBSSN

November 26, 2026
1:30 p.m. PST

USC Trojans vs. Utah State Aggies
Scoring by half: –, –

Acrisure Arena • Palm Desert, California

==== Washington ====
BTN

December 2, 2026
7:30 p.m. PST

Washington Huskies vs. USC Trojans
Scoring by half: –, –

Galen Center • Los Angeles, California

==== at Oregon ====
BTN

December 5, 2026
1:00 p.m. PST

USC Trojans vs. Oregon Ducks
Scoring by half: –, –

Matthew Knight Arena • Eugene, Oregon

==== at San Diego ====
ESPN+

December 8, 2026
6:30 p.m. PST

USC Trojans vs. San Diego Toreros
Scoring by half: –, –

Jenny Craig Pavilion • San Diego, California

==== Texas Tech (US LBM Coast-to-Coast Challenge) ====
ESPN2

December 13, 2026
11:00 a.m. PST

USC Trojans vs. Texas Tech Red Raiders
Scoring by half: –, –

Dickies Arena • Fort Worth, Texas

==== Jacksonville ====
Peacock

December 19, 2026
1:30 p.m. PST

Jacksonville Dolphins vs. USC Trojans
Scoring by half: –, –

Galen Center • Los Angeles, California

==== Western Michigan ====
BTN

December 22, 2026
7:00 p.m. PST

Western Michigan Broncos vs. USC Trojans
Scoring by half: –, –

Galen Center • Los Angeles, California

== Rankings ==
Ranking movements Legend: ██ Increase in ranking ██ Decrease in ranking т = Tied with team above or below
	Week																				
Poll	Pre	1	2	3	4	5	6	7	8	9	10	11	12	13	14	15	16	17	18	19	Final
AP	21	21	18т																		
Coaches	22	22	22																		

== See also ==
- 2026–27 USC Trojans women's basketball team
