= 2025–26 USC Trojans men's basketball team =

American college basketball season

2025–26 USC Trojans men's basketball

Maui Invitational champions
- Conference: Big Ten Conference
- Record: 18–14 (7–13 Big Ten)
- Head coach: Eric Musselman (2nd season)
- Assistant coaches: Will Conroy (2nd season); Todd Lee (2nd season); Michael Musselman (2nd season); Anthony Ruta (2nd season); Earl Boykins (1st season)
- Home arena: Galen Center (Capacity: 10,258)

2025–26 Big Ten Conference men's basketball standings
| | Conf. | | | | Overall |
| Team | W | | L | PCT | W | | L | PCT |
|---|---|---|---|---|---|---|---|---|
| No. 1 Michigan | 19 | – | 1 | .950 | 37 | – | 3 | .925 |
| No. 14 Nebraska | 15 | – | 5 | .750 | 28 | – | 7 | .800 |
| No. 5 Illinois | 15 | – | 5 | .750 | 28 | – | 9 | .757 |
| No. 11 Michigan State | 15 | – | 5 | .750 | 27 | – | 8 | .771 |
| No. 25 Wisconsin | 14 | – | 6 | .700 | 24 | – | 11 | .686 |
| No. 6 Purdue † | 13 | – | 7 | .650 | 30 | – | 9 | .769 |
| UCLA | 13 | – | 7 | .650 | 24 | – | 12 | .667 |
| Ohio State | 12 | – | 8 | .600 | 21 | – | 13 | .618 |
| No. 15 Iowa | 10 | – | 10 | .500 | 24 | – | 13 | .649 |
| Indiana | 9 | – | 11 | .450 | 18 | – | 14 | .563 |
| Minnesota | 8 | – | 12 | .400 | 15 | – | 18 | .455 |
| USC | 7 | – | 13 | .350 | 18 | – | 14 | .563 |
| Washington | 7 | – | 13 | .350 | 16 | – | 17 | .485 |
| Rutgers | 6 | – | 14 | .300 | 14 | – | 20 | .412 |
| Northwestern | 5 | – | 15 | .250 | 15 | – | 19 | .441 |
| Oregon | 5 | – | 15 | .250 | 12 | – | 20 | .375 |
| Maryland | 4 | – | 16 | .200 | 12 | – | 21 | .364 |
| Penn State | 3 | – | 17 | .150 | 12 | – | 20 | .375 |
† 2026 Big Ten tournament winner Rankings from AP poll

The 2025–26 USC Trojans men's basketball team represented the University of Southern California during the 2025–26 NCAA Division I men's basketball season. The Trojans were led by second-year head coach Eric Musselman, and played their home games at the Galen Center for the 19th season in Los Angeles, California as second-year members of the Big Ten Conference.

== Previous season ==
The Trojans finished the 2024–25 season 17–18, 7–13 in Big Ten play to finish in 14th place. In the Big Ten tournament, they defeated Rutgers in the first round before losing to Purdue. They received an invitation to the inaugural College Basketball Crown tournament, where they defeated Tulane before losing to Villanova in the quarterfinals.

== Offseason ==
=== Departures ===
USC departures
| Name | Number | Pos. | Height | Weight | Year | Hometown | Reason for departure |
|---|---|---|---|---|---|---|---|
| Saint Thomas | 0 | F | 6'7" | 220 | Senior | Omaha, NE | Graduated; signed an exhibit 10 contract with the Philadelphia 76ers |
| Desmond Claude | 1 | G | 6'6" | 205 | Junior | New Haven, CT | Transferred to Washington |
| Isaiah Elohim | 2 | G/F | 6'5" | 220 | Freshman | North Hills, CA | Transferred to Florida Atlantic |
| Matt Knowling | 3 | F | 6'6" | 200 | Graduate Student | Manchester, CT | Graduated |
| Bryce Pope | 4 | G | 6'3" | 185 | Graduate Student | San Diego, CA | Graduated |
| Terrance Williams | 5 | F | 6'7" | 225 | Graduate Student | Washington, D.C. | Graduated |
| Wesley Yates III | 6 | G | 6'4" | 200 | (redshirt) Freshman | Beaumont, TX | Transferred to Washington |
| Chibuzo Agbo | 7 | G | 6'7" | 226 | Graduate Student | San Diego, CA | Graduated |
| Kevin Patton Jr. | 8 | G | 6'8" | 200 | Sophomore | Temecula, CA | Transferred to New Mexico |
| Jalen Shelley | 9 | F | 6'8" | 190 | Freshman | Little Elm, TX | Transferred to Loyola Marymount |
| Rashaun Agee | 12 | F | 6'8" | 225 | Graduate Student | Chicago, IL | Transferred to Texas A&M |
| Kallai Patton | 13 | G | 6'4" | 180 | Freshman | Murrieta, CA | Transferred to New Mexico |
| Avand Dorian | 14 | G/F | 6'3" | 195 | Freshman | Los Angeles, CA | Left team |
| JD Plough | 24 | G | 6'3" | 180 | Graduate Student | Palos Verdes Peninsula, CA | Graduated |
| Harrison Hornery | 30 | F | 6'10" | 230 | Senior | Toowoomba, Australia | Graduated |
| Clark Slajchert | 32 | G | 6'1" | 170 | Graduate Student | Los Angeles, CA | Graudated |
| Josh Cohen | 33 | F | 6'10" | 250 | Graduate Student | Lincroft, NJ | Graduated; Drafted 14th overall by the Sioux Falls Skyforce in the 2025 NBA G League draft |

=== Incoming transfers ===
USC incoming transfers
| Name | Number | Pos. | Height | Weight | Year | Hometown | Previous school |
|---|---|---|---|---|---|---|---|
| Rodney Rice | 1 | G | 6'5" | 199 | Junior | Clinton, MD | Maryland |
| Ezra Ausar | 2 | F | 6'9" | 253 | Senior | Atlanta, GA | Utah |
| Amarion Dickerson | 3 | G/F | 6'7" | 197 | Senior | Cleveland, OH | Robert Morris |
| Jacob Cofie | 6 | F | 6'10" | 231 | Sophomore | Seattle, WA | Virginia |
| Jordan Marsh | 7 | G | 5'11" | 146 | Junior | Monroe, NC | UNC Asheville |
| Ryan Cornish | 9 | G | 6'5" | 173 | Graduate Student | Potomac, MD | Dartmouth |
| EJ Neal Jr. | 12 | G | 6'5" | 200 | Graduate Student | San Francisco, CA | Sacramento State |
| Kam Woods | 13 | G | 6'2" | 185 | Graduate Student | Bessemer, AL | Robert Morris |
| Jaden Brownell | 33 | F | 6'10" | 235 | Graduate Student | Sandy, UT | Samford |
| Gabe Dynes | 45 | C | 7'5" | 214 | Junior | Independence, KY | Youngstown State |

=== Recruiting class ===
College recruiting
| Name | Hometown | School | Height | Weight | Commit date |
|---|---|---|---|---|---|
| Alijah Arenas; SG | Oakland, California | Chatsworth HS | 6 ft 7 in (2.01 m) | 197 lb (89 kg) | 6-20-2025 |
| Alijah Arenas; SG | Recruit ratings: 247Sports: | | | | |
| Jerry Easter II; CG | Toledo, Ohio | Link Academy | 6 ft 3 in (1.91 m) | 183 lb (83 kg) | 11-25-2024 |
| Jerry Easter II; CG | Recruit ratings: 247Sports: | | | | |
Overall recruit ranking:
Note: In many cases, Scout, Rivals, 247Sports, On3, and ESPN may conflict in their listings of height and weight.; In these cases, the average was taken. ESPN grades are on a 100-point scale.; Sources: "2025 USC Commits". Rivals.; "ESPN- USC Trojans Men's Basketball Recruiting". ESPN.; "2025 Team Ranking". Rivals.

== Roster ==
2025–26 USC Trojans men's basketball team
Players
Coaches

| Pos. | # | Name | Height | Weight | Year | Previous school | Hometown |
|---|---|---|---|---|---|---|---|
| G | 0 | Alijah Arenas | 6 ft 6 in (1.98 m) | 199 lb (90 kg) | Fr | Chatsworth High School | Woodland Hills, California |
| G | 1 | Rodney Rice (injured) | 6 ft 5 in (1.96 m) | 199 lb (90 kg) | Jr | Maryland | Clinton, Maryland |
| F | 2 | Ezra Ausar | 6 ft 9 in (2.06 m) | 253 lb (115 kg) | Sr | Utah | Atlanta, Georgia |
| G/F | 3 | Amarion Dickerson | 6 ft 7 in (2.01 m) | 197 lb (89 kg) | Sr | Robert Morris | Cleveland, Ohio |
| G/F | 4 | Chad Baker-Mazara (I) | 6 ft 7 in (2.01 m) | 172 lb (78 kg) | GS | Auburn | Santo Domingo, Dominican Republic |
| F | 5 | Terrance Williams II | 6 ft 7 in (2.01 m) | 235 lb (107 kg) | GS | Michigan | Clinton, Maryland |
| F | 6 | Jacob Cofie | 6 ft 10 in (2.08 m) | 231 lb (105 kg) | So | Virginia | Seattle, Washington |
| G | 7 | Jordan Marsh | 5 ft 11 in (1.8 m) | 146 lb (66 kg) | Jr | UNC Asheville | Monroe, North Carolina |
| G | 8 | Jerry Easter II | 6 ft 5 in (1.96 m) | 193 lb (88 kg) | Fr | Link Academy | Toledo, Ohio |
| G | 9 | Ryan Cornish | 6 ft 5 in (1.96 m) | 173 lb (78 kg) | GS | Dartmouth | Potomac, Maryland |
| G | 12 | EJ Neal Jr. | 6 ft 5 in (1.96 m) | 200 lb (91 kg) | GS | Sacramento State | San Francisco, California |
| G | 13 | Kam Woods | 6 ft 2 in (1.88 m) | 185 lb (84 kg) | GS | Robert Morris | Bessemer, Alabama |
| G | 18 | Patrick O'Brien | 6 ft 5 in (1.96 m) | 204 lb (93 kg) | Fr | Cathedral Catholic High School | San Diego, California |
| G | 21 | Jonah Goorin | 6 ft 4 in (1.93 m) | 177 lb (80 kg) | So | Sacred Heart Cathedral Prep | San Francisco, California |
| F | 22 | Brit Burden | 6 ft 7 in (2.01 m) | 210 lb (95 kg) | So | Piedmont High School | Piedmont, California |
| F | 33 | Jaden Brownell | 6 ft 10 in (2.08 m) | 235 lb (107 kg) | GS | Samford | Sandy, Utah |
| C | 45 | Gabe Dynes | 7 ft 5 in (2.26 m) | 214 lb (97 kg) | Jr | Youngstown State | Independence, Kentucky |

Head coach

- Eric Musselman (San Diego)

Assistant coach(es)

- Will Conroy (Washington)
- Todd Lee (South Dakota)
- Michael Musselman (San Diego)
- Anthony Ruta (Arizona State)
- Earl Boykins (Eastern Michigan)

Legend

- (C) Team captain
- (S) Suspended
- (I) Ineligible
- (W) Walk-on
- Injured
- Current redshirt

Roster
Last update: October 29, 2025

== Schedule and results ==
| Date time, TV | Rank^{#} | Opponent^{#} | Result | Record | High points | High rebounds | High assists | Site (attendance) city, state |
Exhibition
| October 18, 2025*; 6:00 p.m., ESPN+ | | at Loyola Marymount | W 60–51 | – | 14 – Baker-Mazara | 8 – Tied | 3 – Tied | Gersten Pavilion (2,431); Los Angeles, CA |
| October 25, 2025*; 6:30 p.m., MW Network | | at Grand Canyon | W 67–61 | – | 15 – Baker-Mazara | 11 – Easter II | 3 – Tied | Global Credit Union Arena (7,379); Phoenix, AZ |
Regular season
| November 3, 2025*; 6:30 p.m., B1G+ | | Cal Poly | W 94–64 | 1–0 | 23 – Cofie | 10 – Cofie | 8 – Rice | Galen Center (3,902); Los Angeles, CA |
| November 9, 2025*; 3:00 p.m., B1G+ | | Manhattan | W 114–83 | 2–0 | 26 – Baker-Mazara | 10 – Cofie | 5 – Cofie | Galen Center (4,378); Los Angeles, CA |
| November 14, 2025*; 4:30 p.m., Peacock | | vs. Illinois State; Hall of Fame Series: Los Angeles | W 87–67 | 3–0 | 21 – Rice | 10 – Rice | 10 – Rice | Intuit Dome (7,554); Inglewood, CA |
| November 20, 2025*; 7:00 p.m., BTN | | Troy | W 107–106 ^{3OT} | 4–0 | 34 – Baker-Mazara | 9 – Baker-Mazara | 9 – Rice | Galen Center (3,342); Los Angeles, CA |
| November 24, 2025*; 2:00 p.m., ESPN2 | | vs. Boise State; Maui Invitational Quarterfinals | W 70–67 | 5–0 | 27 – Rice | 8 – Baker-Mazara | 3 – Rice | Lahaina Civic Center (2,400); Lahaina, HI |
| November 25, 2025*; 2:00 p.m., ESPN | | vs. Seton Hall; Maui Invitational Semifinals | W 83–81 | 6–0 | 25 – Ausar | 11 – Cofie | 3 – Cofie | Lahaina Civic Center; Lahaiana, HI |
| November 26, 2025*; 11:30 a.m., ESPN | | vs. Arizona State; Maui Invitational Championship Game | W 88–75 | 7–0 | 23 – Baker-Mazara | 8 – Cofie | 4 – Tied | Lahaina Civic Center (2,400); Lahaiana, HI |
| December 2, 2025; 7:00 p.m., FS1 | No. 24 | at Oregon | W 82–77 | 8–0 (1–0) | 25 – Baker-Mazara | 9 – Ausar | 3 – Baker-Mazara | Matthew Knight Arena (6,107); Eugene, OR |
| December 6, 2025; 3:00 p.m., BTN | No. 24 | Washington | L 76–84 | 8–1 (1–1) | 21 – Baker-Mazara | 6 – Tied | 4 – Easter II | Galen Center (5,338); Los Angeles, CA |
| December 9, 2025*; 6:00 p.m., ESPN2 | | at San Diego | W 94–81 | 9–1 | 31 – Baker-Mazara | 7 – Ausar | 6 – Baker-Mazara | Jenny Craig Pavilion (2,317); San Diego, CA |
| December 14, 2025*; 4:30 p.m., FS1 | | Washington State | W 68–61 | 10–1 | 21 – Cofie | 10 – Cofie | 5 – Tied | Galen Center (5,394); Los Angeles, CA |
| December 17, 2025*; 6:00 p.m., BTN | | UTSA | W 97–70 | 11–1 | 22 – Ausar | 10 – Ausar | 5 – Baler-Mazara | Galen Center (3,030); Los Angeles, CA |
| December 21, 2025*; 1:00 p.m., BTN | | UC Santa Cruz (Note: This game was originally scheduled to be played against Brown, but Brown's participation was canceled in the wake of the 2025 Brown University shooting.) | W 102–63 | 12–1 | 16 – Dynes | 7 – Tied | 6 – Woods | Galen Center (4,575); Los Angeles, CA |
| January 2, 2026; 4:00 p.m., Peacock/NBCSN | No. 24 | at No. 2 Michigan | L 66–96 | 12–2 (1–2) | 16 – Brownell | 6 – Tied | 2 – Baker-Mazara | Crisler Center (12,707); Ann Arbor, MI |
| January 5, 2026; 5:30 p.m., FS1 | | at No. 12 Michigan State | L 51–80 | 12–3 (1–3) | 16 – Ausar | 7 – Ausar | 3 – Woods | Breslin Event Center (14,797); East Lansing, MI |
| January 9, 2026; 5:30 p.m., BTN | | at Minnesota | W 70–69 ^{OT} | 13–3 (2–3) | 29 – Baker-Mazara | 9 – Ausar | 8 – Baker-Mazara | Williams Arena (9,404); Minneapolis, MN |
| January 13, 2026; 7:30 p.m., FS1 | | Maryland | W 88–71 | 14–3 (3–3) | 20 – Marsh | 8 – Dynes | 4 – Tied | Galen Center (4,586); Los Angeles, CA |
| January 17, 2026; 3:00 p.m., Peacock/NBCSN | | No. 5 Purdue | L 64–69 | 14–4 (3–4) | 15 – Baker-Mazara | 15 – Cofie | 3 – Tied | Galen Center (8,629); Los Angeles, CA |
| January 21, 2026; 8:00 p.m., BTN | | Northwestern | L 68–74 | 14–5 (3–5) | 19 – Marsh | 12 – Cofie | 3 – Tied | Galen Center (4,853); Los Angeles, CA |
| January 25, 2026; 1:00 p.m., Peacock | | at Wisconsin | W 73–71 | 15–5 (4–5) | 29 – Baker-Mazara | 11 – Cofie | 5 – Cofie | Kohl Center (15,216); Madison, WI |
| January 28, 2026; 4:00 p.m., BTN | | at Iowa | L 72–73 | 15–6 (4–6) | 33 – Woods | 7 – Tied | 3 – Woods | Carver–Hawkeye Arena (10,512); Iowa City, IA |
| January 31, 2026; 4:00 p.m., Peacock | | Rutgers | W 78–75 | 16–6 (5–6) | 21 – Ausar | 10 – Cofie | 4 – Woods | Galen Center (5,322); Los Angeles, CA |
| February 3, 2026; 7:00 p.m., Peacock | | Indiana | W 81–75 | 17–6 (6–6) | 29 – Arenas | 7 – Tied | 5 – Cofie | Galen Center (6,353); Los Angeles, CA |
| February 8, 2026; 9:00 a.m., BTN | | at Penn State | W 77–75 | 18–6 (7–6) | 24 – Arenas | 7 – Tied | 9 – Woods | Bryce Jordan Center (6,504); University Park, PA |
| February 11, 2026; 3:30 p.m., BTN | | at Ohio State | L 82–89 | 18–7 (7–7) | 25 – Arenas | 9 – Ausar | 3 – Woods | Value City Arena (11,367); Columbus, OH |
| February 18, 2026; 7:00 p.m., BTN | | No. 10 Illinois | L 65–101 | 18–8 (7–8) | 15 – Ausar | 11 – Ausar | 7 – Woods | Galen Center (7,327); Los Angeles, CA |
| February 21, 2026; 1:00 p.m., FS1 | | Oregon | L 70–71 | 18–9 (7–9) | 21 – Baker-Mazara | 11 – Ausar | 5 – Tied | Galen Center (6,490); Los Angeles, CA |
| February 24, 2026; 8:00 p.m., FS1 | | at UCLA; Rivalry | L 62–81 | 18–10 (7–10) | 25 – Baker-Mazara | 8 – Baker-Mazara | 4 – Cofie | Pauley Pavilion (13,659); Los Angeles, CA |
| February 28, 2026; 1:00 p.m., BTN | | No. 12 Nebraska | L 67–82 | 18–11 (7–11) | 14 – Tied | 5 – Brownell | 4 – Tied | Galen Center (6,645); Los Angeles, CA |
| March 4, 2026; 7:30 p.m., BTN | | at Washington | L 72–91 | 18–12 (7–12) | 19 – Arenas | 11 – Asuar | 3 – Woods | Alaska Airlines Arena (8,121); Seattle, WA |
| March 7, 2026; 6:00 p.m., FS1 | | UCLA; Rivalry/Senior Night | L 68–89 | 18–13 (7–13) | 20 – Arenas | 11 – Ausar | 11 – Woods | Galen Center (8,441); Los Angeles, CA |
Big Ten tournament
| March 11, 2026; 11:30 a.m., Peacock/NBCSN | (13) | vs. (12) Washington; Second round | L 79–83 ^{OT} | 18–14 | 24 – Woods | 9 – Tied | 7 – Woods | United Center (15,661); Chicago, IL |
*Non-conference game. ^{#}Rankings from AP Poll. (#) Tournament seedings in parentheses. All times are in Pacific Time.

== Rankings ==
Ranking movements Legend: ██ Increase in ranking ██ Decrease in ranking — = Not ranked RV = Received votes
| | Week | | | | | | | | | | | | | | | | | | | | |
| Poll | Pre | 1 | 2 | 3 | 4 | 5 | 6 | 7 | 8 | 9 | 10 | 11 | 12 | 13 | 14 | 15 | 16 | 17 | 18 | 19 | Final |
|---|---|---|---|---|---|---|---|---|---|---|---|---|---|---|---|---|---|---|---|---|---|
| AP | RV | RV | RV | RV | 24 | RV | RV | 24 | 24 | RV | RV | — | — | — | — | — | — | — | — | — | — |
| Coaches | RV | RV | RV | RV | RV | RV | RV | 25 | RV | RV | RV | — | — | — | — | — | — | — | — | — | — |

== See also ==
- 2025–26 USC Trojans women's basketball team
