= 2025–26 Minnesota Golden Gophers men's basketball team =

US college basketball team

2025–26 Minnesota Golden Gophers men's basketball

College Basketball Crown, Quarterfinal
- Conference: Big Ten Conference
- Record: 15–18 (8–12 Big Ten)
- Head coach: Niko Medved (1st season)
- Assistant coaches: Armon Gates (1st season); Brian Cooley (1st season); Dave Thorson (5th season); Chad Warner (1st season); Aaron Katsuma (1st season)
- Home arena: Williams Arena

2025–26 Big Ten Conference men's basketball standings
| | Conf. | | | | Overall |
| Team | W | | L | PCT | W | | L | PCT |
|---|---|---|---|---|---|---|---|---|
| No. 1 Michigan | 19 | – | 1 | .950 | 37 | – | 3 | .925 |
| No. 14 Nebraska | 15 | – | 5 | .750 | 28 | – | 7 | .800 |
| No. 5 Illinois | 15 | – | 5 | .750 | 28 | – | 9 | .757 |
| No. 11 Michigan State | 15 | – | 5 | .750 | 27 | – | 8 | .771 |
| No. 25 Wisconsin | 14 | – | 6 | .700 | 24 | – | 11 | .686 |
| No. 6 Purdue † | 13 | – | 7 | .650 | 30 | – | 9 | .769 |
| UCLA | 13 | – | 7 | .650 | 24 | – | 12 | .667 |
| Ohio State | 12 | – | 8 | .600 | 21 | – | 13 | .618 |
| No. 15 Iowa | 10 | – | 10 | .500 | 24 | – | 13 | .649 |
| Indiana | 9 | – | 11 | .450 | 18 | – | 14 | .563 |
| Minnesota | 8 | – | 12 | .400 | 15 | – | 18 | .455 |
| USC | 7 | – | 13 | .350 | 18 | – | 14 | .563 |
| Washington | 7 | – | 13 | .350 | 16 | – | 17 | .485 |
| Rutgers | 6 | – | 14 | .300 | 14 | – | 20 | .412 |
| Northwestern | 5 | – | 15 | .250 | 15 | – | 19 | .441 |
| Oregon | 5 | – | 15 | .250 | 12 | – | 20 | .375 |
| Maryland | 4 | – | 16 | .200 | 12 | – | 21 | .364 |
| Penn State | 3 | – | 17 | .150 | 12 | – | 20 | .375 |
† 2026 Big Ten tournament winner Rankings from AP poll

The 2025–26 Minnesota Golden Gophers men's basketball team represented the University of Minnesota in the 2025–26 NCAA Division I men's basketball season. The Gophers, led by first-year head coach Niko Medved, played their home games at Williams Arena in Minneapolis, Minnesota as members of the Big Ten Conference.

== Previous season ==
The Gophers finished the 2024–25 season 15–17, 7–13 in Big Ten play to finish in a five-way tie for 12th place. As the No. 12 seed in the Big Ten tournament, they lost to Northwestern in the first round.

On March 13, 2025, the school fired head coach Ben Johnson. On March 24, the school named Colorado State head coach Niko Medved the team's new coach.

== Offseason ==
=== Departures ===
Minnesota departures
| Name | Number | Pos. | Height | Weight | Year | Hometown | Reason for departure |
|---|---|---|---|---|---|---|---|
| Frank Mitchell | 00 | F | 6'8" | 260 | RS Junior | Toronto, ON | Transferred to St. Bonaventure |
| Mike Mitchell Jr. | 2 | G | 6'2" | 185 | Senior | San Jose, CA | Graduated; signed professional contract with Leicester Riders |
| Dawson Garcia | 3 | F | 6'11" | 234 | Senior | Savage, MN | Graduated/undrafted in 2024 NBA draft; signed with the Detroit Pistons |
| Kadyn Betts | 4 | F | 6'8" | 225 | RS Sophomore | Pueblo, CO | Transferred to Montana |
| Trey Edmonds | 5 | F/C | 6'10" | 250 | Senior | Aurora, CO | Graduated; signed professional contract with KB Besëlidhja |
| Caleb Williams | 6 | G | 6'2" | 200 | Senior | Wild Rose, WI | Graduated |
| Max Sheridan | 7 | G | 6'0" | 175 | Sophomore | Los Angeles, CA | Walk-on; transferred to Menlo |
| Femi Odukale | 11 | G | 6'6" | 215 | GS Senior | Brooklyn, NY | Graduated; signed professional contract with BC Prievidza |
| Parker Fox | 23 | F | 6'8" | 220 | GS Senior | Mahtomedi, MN | Graduated |
| Brennan Rigsby | 24 | G | 6'3" | 185 | Senior | De Beque, CO | Transferred to Radford |
| Lu'Cye Patterson | 25 | G | 6'2" | 202 | RS Senior | Minneapolis, MN | Graduated |
| Tyler Cochran | 28 | G | 6'3" | 225 | Senior | Bolingbrook, IL | Transferred to Rhode Island |
| Lincoln Meister | 54 | F | 6'9" | 240 | GS Senior | Rochester, MN | Walk-on; graduated |

=== Incoming transfers ===
Minnesota incoming transfers
| Name | Number | Pos. | Height | Weight | Year | Hometown | Previous school |
|---|---|---|---|---|---|---|---|
| Chansey Willis Jr. | 0 | G | 6'2" | 190 | Senior | Detroit, MI | Western Michigan |
| Bobby Durkin | 3 | F | 6'7" | 220 | Junior | Darien, IL | Davidson |
| Nehemiah Turner | 4 | F | 6'10" | 265 | Sophomore | Auburndale, FL | Central Arkansas |
| Jaylen Crocker-Johnson | 5 | F | 6'8" | 230 | Junior | San Antonio, TX | Colorado State |
| Langston Reynolds | 6 | G | 6'4" | 205 | Senior | Denver, CO | Northern Colorado |
| Cade Tyson | 10 | G/F | 6'7" | 200 | Senior | Monroe, NC | North Carolina |
| Maximus Gizzi | 11 | G | 6'1" | | GS Senior | New Palestine, IN | Walk-on; Huntington |
| Chance Stephens | 13 | G | 6'3" | 185 | RS Junior | Riverside, CA | Maryland |
| BJ Omot | 20 | F | 6'8" | 195 | RS Junior | Mankato, Minnesota | California |
| Robert Vaihola | 22 | F | 6'8" | 260 | RS Senior | San Mateo, CA | San Jose State |

=== Recruiting class ===
College recruiting
| Name | Hometown | School | Height | Weight | Commit date |
|---|---|---|---|---|---|
| Kai Shinholster; SG | Philadelphia, PA | William Penn Charter School | 6 ft 5 in (1.96 m) | 175 lb (79 kg) | Sep 4, 2024 |
| Kai Shinholster; SG | Recruit ratings: Rivals: 247Sports: ESPN: (NR) | | | | |
Overall recruit ranking:
Note: In many cases, Scout, Rivals, 247Sports, On3, and ESPN may conflict in their listings of height and weight.; In these cases, the average was taken. ESPN grades are on a 100-point scale.; Sources: "2025 Team Ranking". Rivals.

== Preseason ==
The Golden Gophers were picked to finish in 16th place in a preseason poll of media members. No Gopher players were named to the preseason All-Big Ten team.

== Roster ==
2025–26 Minnesota Golden Gophers men's basketball team
Players
Coaches

| Pos. | # | Name | Height | Weight | Year | Previous school | Hometown |
|---|---|---|---|---|---|---|---|
| G | 0 | Chansey Willis Jr. | 6 ft 2 in (1.88 m) | 205 lb (93 kg) | Sr | Western Michigan | Detroit, MI |
| G | 1 | Isaac Asuma | 6 ft 3 in (1.91 m) | 205 lb (93 kg) | So | Cherry HS | Cherry, MN |
| F | 2 | Grayson Grove | 6 ft 9 in (2.06 m) | 220 lb (100 kg) | RS Fr | Alexandria Area HS | Alexandria, MN |
| F | 3 | Bobby Durkin | 6 ft 7 in (2.01 m) | 220 lb (100 kg) | Jr | Davidson | Darien, IL |
| F | 4 | Nehemiah Turner | 6 ft 10 in (2.08 m) | 270 lb (122 kg) | So | Central Arkansas | Auburndale, FL |
| F | 5 | Jaylen Crocker-Johnson | 6 ft 8 in (2.03 m) | 240 lb (109 kg) | Jr | Colorado State | San Antonio, TX |
| G | 6 | Langston Reynolds | 6 ft 4 in (1.93 m) | 215 lb (98 kg) | Sr | Northern Colorado | Denver, CO |
| G | 8 | Max Lorenson (W) | 6 ft 2 in (1.88 m) | 175 lb (79 kg) | Fr | Eden Prairie HS | Eden Prairie, MN |
| G | 9 | Kai Shinholster | 6 ft 5 in (1.96 m) | 175 lb (79 kg) | Fr | William Penn Charter School | Woolwich Township, NJ |
| G/F | 10 | Cade Tyson | 6 ft 7 in (2.01 m) | 195 lb (88 kg) | Sr | North Carolina | Monroe, NC |
| G | 11 | Maximus Gizzi | 6 ft 1 in (1.85 m) | 185 lb (84 kg) | GS | Huntington | New Palestine, IN |
| G | 12 | RJ Spencer (W) | 6 ft 3 in (1.91 m) | 185 lb (84 kg) | Sr | Totino-Grace HS | Blaine, MN |
| G | 13 | Chance Stephens | 6 ft 3 in (1.91 m) | 185 lb (84 kg) | RS Jr | Maryland | Riverside, CA |
| F | 20 | BJ Omot | 6 ft 8 in (2.03 m) | 200 lb (91 kg) | RS Jr | California | Mankato, MN |
| F | 22 | Robert Vaihola | 6 ft 8 in (2.03 m) | 265 lb (120 kg) | RS Sr | San Jose State | San Mateo, CA |

Head coach

- Niko Medved (Minnesota)

Assistant coach(es)

- Armon Gates (Kent State)
- Brian Cooley (Nebraska Wesleyan)
- Dave Thorson (Hamline)
- Chad Warner (Georgia)
- Aaron Katsuma (Minnesota)

Legend

- (C) Team captain
- (S) Suspended
- (I) Ineligible
- (W) Walk-on
- Injured
- Current redshirt

Roster

== Schedule and results ==
| Date time, TV | Rank^{#} | Opponent^{#} | Result | Record | High points | High rebounds | High assists | Site (attendance) city, state |
Exhibition
| October 16, 2025*; 7:00 p.m., B1G+ | | North Dakota State | W 80–54 | | 28 – Tyson | 14 – Vaihola | 6 – Reynolds | Williams Arena (7,332); Minneapolis, MN |
| October 25, 2025*; 2:00 p.m., B1G+ | | North Dakota | W 82–62 | | 26 – Tyson | 7 – Vaihola | 8 – Willis Jr. | Williams Arena (7,512); Minneapolis, MN |
Regular season
| November 3, 2025*; 7:00 p.m., B1G+ | | Gardner–Webb | W 87–60 | 1–0 | 30 – Tyson | 14 – Crocker-Johnson | 7 – Asuma | Williams Arena (7,669); Minneapolis, MN |
| November 8, 2025*; 11:00 a.m., Peacock | | Alcorn State | W 95–50 | 2–0 | 21 – Tyson | 16 – Crocker-Johnson | 5 – Asuma | Williams Arena (7,166); Minneapolis, MN |
| November 12, 2025*; 7:00 p.m., SECN+/ESPN+ | | at Missouri | L 60–83 | 2–1 | 17 – Tyson | 12 – Crocker–Johnson | 3 – Willis Jr. | Mizzou Arena (8,969); Columbia, MO |
| November 15, 2025*; 8:00 p.m., BTN | | Green Bay | W 72–65 ^{OT} | 3–1 | 27 – Tyson | 11 – Crocker–Johnson | 7 – Asuma | Williams Arena (7,431); Minneapolis, MN |
| November 18, 2025*; 7:00 p.m., B1G+ | | Chicago State; Acrisure Series campus-site game | W 66–54 | 4–1 | 22 – Tyson | 8 – Vaihola | 6 – Reynolds | Williams Arena (6,774); Minneapolis, MN |
| November 22, 2025*; 4:30 p.m., Peacock | | vs. San Francisco | L 65–77 | 4–2 | 16 – Reynolds | 5 – Tied | 3 – Tied | Sanford Pentagon (2,467); Sioux Falls, SD |
| November 27, 2025*; 8:30 p.m., CBSSN | | vs. Stanford; Acrisure Invitational semifinal | L 68–72 | 4–3 | 23 – Crocker-Johnson | 6 – Reynolds | 4 – Tied | Acrisure Arena; Thousand Palms, CA |
| November 28, 2025*; 8:30 p.m., TruTV | | vs. Santa Clara; Acrisure Invitational third-place game | L 75–86 | 4–4 | 29 – Tyson | 7 – Shinholster | 5 – Asuma | Acrisure Arena; Thousand Palms, CA |
| December 3, 2025; 6:00 p.m., BTN | | No. 22 Indiana | W 73–64 | 5–4 (1–0) | 17 – Tied | 8 – Tyson | 4 – Tied | Williams Arena (8,582); Minneapolis, MN |
| December 10, 2025; 6:00 p.m., BTN | | at No. 6 Purdue | L 57–85 | 5–5 (1–1) | 17 – Crocker-Johnson | 5 – Tied | 5 – Asuma | Mackey Arena (14,876); West Lafayette, IN |
| December 14, 2025*; 12:00 p.m., BTN | | Texas Southern | W 89–53 | 6–5 | 38 – Tyson | 11 – Tyson | 10 – Reynolds | Williams Arena (8,254); Minneapolis, MN |
| December 21, 2025; 5:00 p.m., BTN | | Campbell | W 78–50 | 7–5 | 24 – Tyson | 7 – Tyson | 6 – Asuma | Williams Arena (7,988); Minneapolis, MN |
| December 29, 2025*; 8:00 p.m., BTN | | Fairleigh Dickinson | W 60–43 | 8–5 | 19 – Durkin | 7 – Crocker-Johnson | 5 – Shinholster | Williams Arena (7,638); Minneapolis, MN |
| January 3, 2026; 4:00 p.m., BTN | | at Northwestern | W 84–78 | 9–5 (2–1) | 24 – Tyson | 9 – Asuma | 13 – Reynolds | Welsh–Ryan Arena (5,088); Evanston, IL |
| January 6, 2026; 7:00 p.m., BTN | | No. 19 Iowa | W 70–67 | 10–5 (3–1) | 22 – Reynolds | 6 – Crocker-Johnson | 4 – Tied | Williams Arena (8,976); Minneapolis, MN |
| January 9, 2026; 7:30 p.m., BTN | | USC | L 69–70 ^{OT} | 10–6 (3–2) | 20 – Tyson | 8 – Tyson | 6 – Asuma | Williams Arena (9,404); Minneapolis, MN |
| January 13, 2026; 6:00 p.m., BTN | | Wisconsin | L 75–78 | 10–7 (3–3) | 20 – Crocker-Johnson | 9 – Asuma | 10 – Reynolds | Williams Arena (10,914); Minneapolis, MN |
| January 17, 2026; 11:00 a.m., BTN | | at No. 13 Illinois | L 67–77 | 10–8 (3–4) | 22 – Crocker-Johnson | 8 – Tied | 5 – Reynolds | State Farm Center (15,544); Champaign, IL |
| January 20, 2026; 5:30 p.m., BTN | | at Ohio State | L 74–82 ^{OT} | 10–9 (3–5) | 26 – Crocker-Johnson | 8 – Tied | 5 – Tied | Value City Arena (8,750); Columbus, OH |
| January 24, 2026; 11:00 a.m., FS1 | | No. 7 Nebraska | L 57–76 | 10–10 (3–6) | 16 – Durkin | 8 – Crocker-Johnson | 4 – Tied | Williams Arena (11,339); Minneapolis, MN |
| January 28, 2026; 8:00 p.m., BTN | | at Wisconsin | L 63–67 | 10–11 (3–7) | 20 – Durkin | 8 – Reynolds | 5 – Reynolds | Kohl Center (14,653); Madison, WI |
| February 1, 2026; 1:00 p.m., Peacock | | at Penn State | L 75–77 | 10–12 (3–8) | 18 – Reynolds | 7 – Crocker-Johnson | 7 – Reynolds | Bryce Jordan Center (6,820); University Park, PA |
| February 4, 2026; 6:00 p.m., BTN | | No. 10 Michigan State | W 76–73 | 11–12 (4–8) | 22 – Crocker-Johnson | 8 – Durkin | 8 – Reynolds | Williams Arena (8,994); Minneapolis, MN |
| February 8, 2026; 1:00 p.m., BTN | | Maryland | L 62–67 | 11–13 (4–9) | 18 – Asuma | 6 – Tied | 5 – Reynolds | Williams Arena (8,559); Minneapolis, MN |
| February 14, 2026; 8:00 p.m., Peacock | | at Washington | L 57–69 | 11–14 (4–10) | 22 – Tyson | 9 – Tyson | 2 – Tied | Hec Edmundson Pavilion (6,651); Seattle, WA |
| February 17, 2026; 9:30 p.m., FS1 | | at Oregon | W 61–44 | 12–14 (5–10) | 15 – Asuma | 8 – Tied | 4 – Tied | Matthew Knight Arena (5,204); Eugene, OR |
| February 21, 2026; 11:00 a.m., BTN | | Rutgers | W 80–61 | 13–14 (6–10) | 27 – Tyson | 10 – Tyson | 9 – Reynolds | Williams Arena (9,017); Minneapolis, MN |
| February 24, 2026; 7:30 p.m., BTN | | at No. 3 Michigan | L 67–77 | 13–15 (6–11) | 20 – Tyson | 6 – Tyson | 5 – Grove | Crisler Center (12,707); Ann Arbor, MI |
| February 28, 2026; 1:00 p.m., FS1 | | UCLA | W 78–73 | 14–15 (7–11) | 23 – Durkin | 6 – Tied | 7 – Grove | Williams Arena (9,811); Minneapolis, MN |
| March 4, 2026; 5:30 p.m., BTN | | at Indiana | L 47–77 | 14–16 (7–12) | 21 – Tyson | 8 – Durkin | 3 – Reynolds | Simon Skjodt Assembly Hall (17,222); Bloomington, IN |
| March 7, 2026; 8:00 p.m., BTN | | Northwestern | W 67–66 | 15–16 (8–12) | 21 – Reynolds | 8 – Asuma | 6 – Grove | Williams Arena (8,760); Minneapolis, MN |
Big Ten tournament
| March 11, 2026; 8:00 p.m., BTN | (11) | vs. (14) Rutgers; Second round | L 67–72 | 15–17 | 24 – Tyson | 7 – Reynolds | 8 – Reynolds | United Center (16,122); Chicago, IL |
College Basketball Crown
| April 1, 2026*; 9:30 p.m., FS1 | | vs. Baylor; Quarterfinal | L 48–67 | 15–18 | 19 – Tyson | 7 – Tied | 4 – Reynolds | MGM Grand Garden Arena; Paradise, NV |
*Non-conference game. ^{#}Rankings from AP poll. (#) Tournament seedings in parentheses. All times are in Central Time.
