= 2025–26 Maryland Terrapins men's basketball team =

American basketball team

2025–26 Maryland Terrapins men's basketball
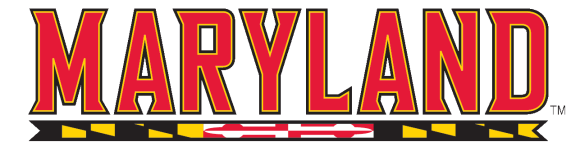
- Conference: Big Ten Conference
- Record: 12–21 (4–16 Big Ten)
- Head coach: Buzz Williams (1st season)
- Associate head coach: Devin Johnson
- Assistant coaches: Lyle Wolf; Steve Roccaforte; Wabissa Bede; Aki Collins
- Home arena: Xfinity Center

2025–26 Big Ten Conference men's basketball standings
	Conf.				Overall
Team	W		L	PCT	W		L	PCT
No. 1 Michigan	19	–	1	.950	37	–	3	.925
No. 14 Nebraska	15	–	5	.750	28	–	7	.800
No. 5 Illinois	15	–	5	.750	28	–	9	.757
No. 11 Michigan State	15	–	5	.750	27	–	8	.771
No. 25 Wisconsin	14	–	6	.700	24	–	11	.686
No. 6 Purdue †	13	–	7	.650	30	–	9	.769
UCLA	13	–	7	.650	24	–	12	.667
Ohio State	12	–	8	.600	21	–	13	.618
No. 15 Iowa	10	–	10	.500	24	–	13	.649
Indiana	9	–	11	.450	18	–	14	.563
Minnesota	8	–	12	.400	15	–	18	.455
USC	7	–	13	.350	18	–	14	.563
Washington	7	–	13	.350	16	–	17	.485
Rutgers	6	–	14	.300	14	–	20	.412
Northwestern	5	–	15	.250	15	–	19	.441
Oregon	5	–	15	.250	12	–	20	.375
Maryland	4	–	16	.200	12	–	21	.364
Penn State	3	–	17	.150	12	–	20	.375
† 2026 Big Ten tournament winner Rankings from AP poll

The 2025–26 Maryland Terrapins men's basketball team represented the University of Maryland, College Park during the 2025–26 NCAA Division I men's basketball season. The Terrapins, led by first-year head coach Buzz Williams, played their home games at Xfinity Center in College Park, Maryland, as a member of the Big Ten Conference.

== Previous season ==
The Terrapins finished the 2024–25 season 27–9, 14–6 in Big Ten play to finish in a tie for second place. As the No. 2 seed in the Big Ten tournament, they beat Illinois in the quarterfinals before losing to Michigan in the semifinals. They received an at-large bid to the NCAA tournament as the No. 4 seed in the West region. They defeated Grand Canyon and Colorado State to advance to the Sweet Sixteen. There, they lost to the eventual champion Florida, 87–71.

Following the season, head coach Kevin Willard left the team to take the head coaching position at Villanova. On April 1, the school named Texas A&M head coach Buzz Williams the team's new head coach.

== Offseason ==
=== Departures ===
Maryland departures
Name	Number	Pos.	Height	Weight	Year	Hometown	Reason for departure
Ja'Kobi Gillespie	0	G	6'1"	186	Junior	Greenville, TN	Transferred to Tennessee
Rodney Rice	1	G	6'4"	198	Sophomore	Clinton, MD	Transferred to USC
Jahari Long	2	G	6'5"	200	Graduate Student	Houston, TX	Transferred to George Mason
Braden Pierce	4	C	7'0"	245	(redshirt) Freshman	Woodstock, GA	Transferred to Villanova
DeShawn Harris-Smith	5	G	6'5"	208	Sophomore	Woodbridge, VA	Transferred to Georgetown
Tafara Gapare	6	F	6'9"	215	Junior	Wellington, New Zealand	Transferred to Villanova
Malachi Palmer	7	G	6'6"	212	Freshman	Harrisburg, PA	Transferred to Villanova
Jay Young	8	G	6'2"	180	Graduate Student	Dallas, TX	Graduated
Selton Miguel	9	G	6'4"	217	Graduate Student	Luanda, Angola	Graduated
Julian Reese	10	F	6'9"	252	Senior	Baltimore, MD	Graduated/undrafted in 2025 NBA draft; signed an exhibit 10 contract with Raptors 905
Chance Stephens	13	G	6'3"	185	(redshirt) Sophomore	Riverside, CA	Transferred to Minnesota
Jordan Geronimo	22	F	6'6"	225	Graduate Student	Newark, NJ	Graduated
Derik Queen	25	C	6'10"	246	Freshman	Baltimore, MD	Declared for 2025 NBA draft; selected 13th overall by the Atlanta Hawks, but traded to the New Orleans Pelicans
Ben Murphy	40	G	6'1"	210	Senior	Reisterstown, MD	Walk-on; graduated

=== Incoming transfers ===
Maryland incoming transfers
Name	Number	Pos.	Height	Weight	Year	Hometown	Previous school
David Coit	8	G	5'11"	175	Graduate Student	Columbus, NJ	Kansas
Collin Metcalf	45	C	6'9"	233	Senior	Nortorf, Germany	Northeastern
Andre Mills	7	G	6'4"	205	(redshirt) Freshman	Boston, MA	Texas A&M
Rakease Passmore	4	F	6'5"	185	Sophomore	Palatka, FL	Kansas
Pharrel Payne	21	F/C	6'9"	250	Senior	Cottage Grove, MN	Texas A&M
Myles Rice	2	G	6'3"	185	(redshirt) Junior	Columbia, SC	Indiana
Elijah Saunders	13	F	6'8"	229	Senior	Phoenix, AZ	Virginia
George Turkson Jr.	11	G/F	6'7"	220	(redshirt) Freshman	Lowell, MA	Texas A&M
Solomon Washington	9	F	6'7"	220	Senior	New Orleans, LA	Texas A&M
Isaiah Watts	12	G	6'3"	170	Junior	West Seattle, WA	Washington State

=== Recruiting classes ===
==== 2025 recruiting class ====
College recruiting
Name	Hometown	School	Height	Weight	Commit date
Darius Adams #6 SG	Manasquan, NJ	La Lumiere School	6 ft 5 in (1.96 m)	175 lb (79 kg)	May 2, 2025
Darius Adams #6 SG	Recruit ratings: Rivals: 247Sports: ESPN: (88)				
Aleks Alston #11 SF	Chicago, IL	Kenwood Academy High School	6 ft 8 in (2.03 m)	205 lb (93 kg)	May 27, 2025
Aleks Alston #11 SF	Recruit ratings: Rivals: 247Sports: ESPN: (83)				
Jaziah Harper; SF	Crown Point, IN	Don Bosco Prep Academy	6 ft 7 in (2.01 m)	205 lb (93 kg)	May 26, 2025
Jaziah Harper; SF	Recruit ratings: Rivals: 247Sports: ESPN: (NR)				
Guillermo Del Pino; PG	Spain	N/A	6 ft 4 in (1.93 m)	155 lb (70 kg)	May 2, 2025
Guillermo Del Pino; PG	Recruit ratings: Rivals: 247Sports: ESPN: (NR)				
Overall recruit ranking: Rivals: 30 247Sports: 35 ESPN: —
Note: In many cases, Scout, Rivals, 247Sports, On3, and ESPN may conflict in their listings of height and weight.; In these cases, the average was taken. ESPN grades are on a 100-point scale.; Sources: "Maryland 2025 Basketball Commitments". Rivals.; "2025 Maryland Terrapins Recruiting Class". ESPN.; "2025 Team Ranking". Rivals.

==== 2026 recruiting class ====
College recruiting (2026)
Name	Hometown	School	Height	Weight	Commit date
Austin Brown #16 PF	Lufkin, TX	Lufkin High School	6 ft 7 in (2.01 m)	180 lb (82 kg)	Jun 30, 2025
Austin Brown #16 PF	Recruit ratings: Rivals: 247Sports: ESPN: (82)				
Overall recruit ranking: Rivals: 30 247Sports: 35 ESPN: —
Note: In many cases, Scout, Rivals, 247Sports, On3, and ESPN may conflict in their listings of height and weight.; In these cases, the average was taken. ESPN grades are on a 100-point scale.; Sources: "Maryland 2026 Basketball Commitments". Rivals.; "2026 Maryland Terrapins Recruiting Class". ESPN.; "2026 Team Ranking". Rivals.

== Roster ==
2025–26 Maryland Terrapins men's basketball team
Players
Coaches

Pos.	#	Name	Height	Weight	Year	Previous school	Hometown
G	1	Darius Adams	6 ft 5 in (1.96 m)	190 lb (86 kg)	Fr	La Lumiere School	Manchester Township, NJ
G	2	Myles Rice	6 ft 3 in (1.91 m)	185 lb (84 kg)	RS Jr	Indiana	Columbia, SC
G	4	Rakease Passmore	6 ft 5 in (1.96 m)	195 lb (88 kg)	So	Kansas	Palatka, FL
G	7	Andre Mills	6 ft 4 in (1.93 m)	205 lb (93 kg)	RS Fr	Texas A&M	Boston, MA
G	8	David Coit	5 ft 11 in (1.8 m)	180 lb (82 kg)	GS	Kansas	Columbus, NJ
F	9	Solomon Washington	6 ft 7 in (2.01 m)	220 lb (100 kg)	Sr	Texas A&M	New Orleans, LA
G/F	11	George Turkson Jr.	6 ft 7 in (2.01 m)	220 lb (100 kg)	RS Fr	Texas A&M	Lowell, MA
G	12	Isaiah Watts	6 ft 3 in (1.91 m)	180 lb (82 kg)	Jr	Washington State	West Seattle, WA
F	13	Elijah Saunders	6 ft 8 in (2.03 m)	240 lb (109 kg)	Sr	Virginia	Phoenix, AZ
G/F	15	Jaziah Harper	6 ft 7 in (2.01 m)	190 lb (86 kg)	Fr	Bosco Institute	Oak Park, IL
G	18	Guillermo Del Pino	6 ft 5 in (1.96 m)	183 lb (83 kg)	Fr	Unicaja Malaga Academy	Córdoba, Spain
F/C	21	Pharrel Payne	6 ft 9 in (2.06 m)	250 lb (113 kg)	Sr	Texas A&M	Cottage Grove, MN
F	24	Aleks Alston	6 ft 10 in (2.08 m)	220 lb (100 kg)	Fr	Kenwood Academy	Chicago, IL
G	25	Nick Blake (W)	6 ft 2 in (1.88 m)	180 lb (82 kg)	Fr	Olympia HS	Orlando, FL
G	30	Lukas Sotell (W)	6 ft 3 in (1.91 m)	180 lb (82 kg)	Jr	Montverde Academy	Stamford, CT
C	45	Collin Metcalf	6 ft 9 in (2.06 m)	240 lb (109 kg)	Sr	Northeastern	Nortorf, Germany

Head coach

- Buzz Williams (Oklahoma City)

Assistant coach(es)

- Devin Johnson (LSU New Orleans)
- Lyle Wolf (Transylvania)
- Steve Roccaforte (Lamar)
- Wabissa Bede (Virginia Tech)
- Aki Collins (Clark Atlanta)

Legend

- (C) Team captain
- (S) Suspended
- (I) Ineligible
- (W) Walk-on
- Injured
- Current redshirt

Roster

== Schedule and results ==
Date time, TV	Rank^{#}	Opponent^{#}	Result	Record	High points	High rebounds	High assists	Site (attendance) city, state
Exhibition
October 27, 2025*; 7:00 p.m., B1G+		UMBC	W 82–81	—	26 – Payne	10 – Turkson Jr.	3 – Tied	Xfinity Center (11,410); College Park, MD
Regular season
November 3, 2025*; 6:30 p.m., BTN		vs. Coppin State; Naismith Hall of Fame Series Baltimore	W 83–61	1–0	21 – Payne	6 – Tied	4 – Coit	CFG Bank Arena (7,863); Baltimore, MD
November 7, 2025*; 6:00 p.m., FS1		Georgetown	L 60–70	1–1	19 – Rice	11 – Payne	5 – Rice	Xfinity Center (16,594); College Park, MD
November 11, 2025*; 7:00 p.m., B1G+		Alcorn State	W 84–64	2–1	22 – Payne	8 – Mills	3 – Tied	Xfinity Center (10,461); College Park, MD
November 15, 2025*; 2:00 p.m., Peacock		at Marquette	W 89–82	3–1	19 – Coit	11 – Saunders	5 – Coit	Fiserv Forum (15,586); Milwaukee, WI
November 19, 2025*; 7:00 p.m., B1G+		Mount St. Mary's	W 95–90 ^{OT}	4–1	41 – Coit	8 – Mills	3 – Tied	Xfinity Center (10,318); College Park, MD
November 25, 2025*; 12:00 a.m., TNT		vs. UNLV; Players Era Festival Game 1	W 74–67	5–1	20 – Payne	8 – Tied	6 – Rice	MGM Grand Garden Arena; Paradise, NV
November 25, 2025*; 9:30 p.m., TruTV		vs. No. 12 Gonzaga; Players Era Festival Game 2	L 61–100	5–2	14 – Payne	8 – Alston	4 – Coit	MGM Grand Garden Arena (2,799); Paradise, NV
November 27, 2025*; 12:00 a.m., TNT		vs. No. 8 Alabama; Players Era Festival Consolation Game	L 72–105	5–3	20 – Adams	7 – Alston	4 – Payne	MGM Grand Garden Arena (3,947); Paradise, NV
December 2, 2025*; 8:00 p.m., BTN		Wagner	W 89–63	6–3	30 – Payne	10 – Payne	4 – Coit	Xfinity Center (10,155); College Park, MD
December 6, 2025; 4:00 p.m., FS1		at Iowa	L 64–83	6–4 (0–1)	17 – Payne	14 – Payne	2 – Tied	Carver-Hawkeye Arena (10,956); Iowa City, IA
December 13, 2025*; 8:00 p.m., FOX		No. 2 Michigan	L 83–101	6–5 (0–2)	31 – Coit	6 – Coit	3 – Coit	Xfinity Center (16,675); College Park, MD
December 20, 2025*; 6:00 p.m., ESPN		at No. 23т Virginia	L 72–80	6–6	15 – Coit	12 – Washington	5 – Turkson Jr.	John Paul Jones Arena (12,671); Charlottesville, VA
December 28, 2025*; 6:00 p.m., BTN		Old Dominion	W 73–58	7–6	18 – Adams	13 – Washington	6 – Coit	Xfinity Center (13,254); College Park, MD
January 2, 2026; 7:30 p.m., Peacock		Oregon	L 54–64	7–7 (0–3)	17 – Washington	12 – Washington	3 – Adams	Xfinity Center (11,291); College Park, MD
January 7, 2026; 6:30 p.m., BTN		Indiana	L 66–84	7–8 (0–4)	16 – Saunders	9 – Washington	4 – Mills	Xfinity Center (12,181); College Park, MD
January 10, 2026; 8:00 p.m., FOX		at UCLA	L 55–67	7–9 (0–5)	17 – Saunders	12 – Tied	3 – Tied	Pauley Pavilion (6,879); Los Angeles, CA
January 13, 2026; 10:30 p.m., FS1		at USC	L 71–88	7–10 (0–6)	30 – Coit	9 – Washington	1 – Tied	Galen Center (4,586); Los Angeles, CA
January 18, 2026; 12:00 p.m., BTN		Penn State	W 96–73	8–10 (1–6)	43 – Coit	11 – Washington	4 – Coit	Xfinity Center (11,567); College Park, MD
January 21, 2026; 7:00 p.m., BTN		at No. 11 Illinois	L 70–89	8–11 (1–7)	15 – Coit	10 – Washington	5 – Coit	State Farm Center (15,201); Champaign, IL
January 24, 2026; 12:00 p.m., CBS		at No. 10 Michigan State	L 48–91	8–12 (1–8)	13 – Saunders	6 – Washington	4 – Washington	Breslin Center (14,797); East Lansing, MI
February 1, 2026; 1:00 p.m., CBS		No. 12 Purdue	L 63–93	8–13 (1–9)	18 – Mills	6 – Tied	3 – Mills	Xfinity Center (16,026); College Park, MD
February 5, 2026; 8:30 p.m., FS1		Ohio State	L 62–82	8–14 (1–10)	20 – Saunders	8 – Washington	2 – Tied	Xfinity Center (12,358); College Park, MD
February 8, 2026; 2:00 p.m., BTN		at Minnesota	W 67–62	9–14 (2–10)	29 – Coit	10 – Washington	3 – Adams	Williams Arena (8,559); Minneapolis, MN
February 11, 2026; 6:00 p.m., FS1		Iowa	W 77–70	10–14 (3–10)	24 – Mills	8 – Tied	5 – Coit	Xfinity Center (12,055); College Park, MD
February 15, 2026; 12:00 p.m., FS1		at Rutgers	L 57–68	10–15 (3–11)	13 – Adams	14 – Washington	5 – Coit	Jersey Mike's Arena (8,000); Piscataway, NJ
February 18, 2026; 8:00 p.m., BTN		at Northwestern	L 74–78	10–16 (3–12)	39 – Mills	14 – Washington	5 – Saunders	Welsh-Ryan Arena (4,974); Evanston, IL
February 21, 2026; 3:00 p.m., Peacock		Washington	W 64–60	11–16 (4–12)	21 – Mills	11 – Washington	5 – Mills	Xfinity Center (12,480); College Park, MD
February 25, 2026; 7:00 p.m., BTN		at No. 12 Nebraska	L 61–74	11–17 (4–13)	19 – Mills	7 – Washington	6 – Adams	Pinnacle Bank Arena (15,028); Lincoln, NE
March 1, 2026; 12:00 p.m., FS1		Rutgers	L 65–69	11–18 (4–14)	15 – Tied	14 – Saunders	4 – Saunders	Xfinity Center (12,237); College Park, MD
March 4, 2026; 8:00 p.m., FS1		at Wisconsin	L 45–78	11–19 (4–15)	14 – Mills	8 – Tied	3 – Adams	Kohl Center (16,838); Madison, WI
March 8, 2026; 3:00 p.m., FOX		No. 11 Illinois	L 72–78	11–20 (4–16)	30 – Mills	7 – Washington	3 – Tied	Xfinity Center (15,674); College Park, MD
Big Ten tournament
March 10, 2026; 5:00 p.m., Peacock/NBCSN	(17)	vs. (16) Oregon; First round	W 70–60	12–20	17 – Coit	6 – Tied	5 – Mills	United Center (15,828); Chicago, IL
March 11, 2026; 12:00 p.m., Peacock/NBCSN	(17)	vs. (9) Iowa; Second round	L 64–75	12–21	14 – Adams	13 – Washington	2 – Tied	United Center (15,661); Chicago, IL
*Non-conference game. ^{#}Rankings from AP Poll. (#) Tournament seedings in parentheses. All times are in Eastern Time.
