= 2024–25 Minnesota Golden Gophers men's basketball team =

American college basketball season

2024–25 Minnesota Golden Gophers men's basketball
- Conference: Big Ten Conference
- Record: 15–17 (7–13 Big Ten)
- Head coach: Ben Johnson (4th season)
- Assistant coaches: Dave Thorson (4th season); Jason Kemp (4th season); Marcus Jenkins (4th season); Josh Adel (2nd season)
- Home arena: Williams Arena

2024–25 Big Ten Conference men's basketball standings
	Conf.				Overall
Team	W		L	PCT	W		L	PCT
No. 7 Michigan State	17	–	3	.850	30	–	7	.811
No. 9 Maryland	14	–	6	.700	27	–	9	.750
No. 10 Michigan †	14	–	6	.700	27	–	10	.730
UCLA	13	–	7	.650	23	–	11	.676
No. 16 Wisconsin	13	–	7	.650	27	–	10	.730
No. 14 Purdue	13	–	7	.650	24	–	12	.667
Illinois	12	–	8	.600	22	–	13	.629
Oregon	12	–	8	.600	25	–	10	.714
Indiana	10	–	10	.500	19	–	13	.594
Ohio State	9	–	11	.450	17	–	15	.531
Rutgers	8	–	12	.400	15	–	17	.469
Minnesota	7	–	13	.350	15	–	17	.469
Northwestern	7	–	13	.350	17	–	16	.515
USC	7	–	13	.350	17	–	18	.486
Iowa	7	–	13	.350	17	–	16	.515
Nebraska	7	–	13	.350	21	–	14	.600
Penn State	6	–	14	.300	16	–	15	.516
Washington	4	–	16	.200	13	–	18	.419
† 2025 Big Ten tournament winner Rankings from AP poll

The 2024–25 Minnesota Golden Gophers men's basketball team represented the University of Minnesota in the 2024–25 NCAA Division I men's basketball season. The Gophers, led by fourth-year head coach Ben Johnson, played their home games at Williams Arena in Minneapolis, Minnesota as members of the Big Ten Conference. They finished the season 15–17, 7–13 in Big Ten play to finish in a five-way tie for 12th place. As the No. 12 seed in the Big Ten tournament, they lost to Northwestern in the first round.

On March 13, 2025, the school fired head coach Ben Johnson. On March 24, the school named Colorado State head coach Niko Medved the team's new coach.

== Previous season ==
The Gophers finished the 2023–24 season 19–15, 9–11 in Big Ten play, to finish in a three-way tie for ninth place. As a No. 9 seed in the Big Ten tournament, they lost in the second round to Michigan State. They received an at-large bid to the National Invitation Tournament where they defeated Butler in the first round before losing to Indiana State.

== Offseason ==
=== Departures ===
Name	Number	Pos.	Height	Weight	Year	Hometown	Reason for departure
Elijah Hawkins	0	G	5'11"	165	Junior	Washington, D.C.	Transferred to Texas Tech
Joshua Ola-Joseph	1	F	6'7"	215	Sophomore	Brooklyn Park, MN	Transferred to California
Braden Carrington	4	G	6'4"	195	Sophomore	Brooklyn Park, MN	Transferred to Tulsa
Isaiah Ihnen	5	F	6'10"	220	(redshirt) Junior	Böblingen, Germany	Transferred to Liberty
Kris Keinys	8	F	6'8"	215	Freshman	Klaipėda, Lithuania	Transferred to Pacific
Jackson Purcell	11	G	6'5"	195	(redshirt) Sophomore	Apple Valley, MN	Walk-on; left the team
Pharrel Payne	21	F	6'9"	255	Sophomore	Cottage Grove, MN	Transferred to Texas A&M
Cam Christie	24	G	6'6"	190	Freshman	Arlington Heights, IL	Declared for 2024 NBA draft; selected 46th overall by Los Angeles Clippers
Will Ramberg	25	G	6'5"	205	Senior	Grand Marais, MN	Walk-on; graduated
Jack Wilson	33	C	6'11"	285	GS Senior	Montara, CA	Graduated

=== Incoming transfers ===
Name	Number	Pos.	Height	Weight	Year	Hometown	Previous school
Frank Mitchell	00	F	6'8"	240	Senior	Toronto, ON	Canisius
Trey Edmonds	5	F/C	6'10"	255	Senior	Aurora, CO	UTSA
Caleb Williams	6	G	6'2'		Senior	Wild Rose, WI	Macalester College
Femi Odukale	11	G	6'6"	205	GS Senior	Brooklyn, NY	New Mexico State
Brennan Rigsby	24	G/F	6'5"	195	Senior	De Beque, CO	Oregon
Lu'Cye Patterson	25	G	6'2"	205	(redshirt) Senior	Minneapolis, MN	Charlotte
Tyler Cochran	28	G	6'2"	225	Senior	Bolingbrook, IL	Toledo
Lincoln Meister	54	F	6'9"	235	GS Senior	Rochester, MN	Walk-on; Minnesota Duluth

=== Recruiting class ===
College recruiting information
Name	Hometown	School	Height	Weight	Commit date
Isaac Asuma #16 PG	Iron, MN	Cherry School	6 ft 2 in (1.88 m)	180 lb (82 kg)	Mar 2, 2023
Isaac Asuma #16 PG	Recruit ratings: Rivals: 247Sports: ESPN: (82)				
Grayson Grove; PF	Alexandria, MN	Alexandria Area High School	6 ft 8 in (2.03 m)	200 lb (91 kg)	May 13, 2023
Grayson Grove; PF	Recruit ratings: Rivals: 247Sports:				
Overall recruit ranking:
Note: In many cases, Scout, Rivals, 247Sports, On3, and ESPN may conflict in their listings of height and weight.; In these cases, the average was taken. ESPN grades are on a 100-point scale.; Sources: "2024 Team Ranking". Rivals.

== Roster ==
2024–25 Minnesota Golden Gophers men's basketball team
Players
Coaches

Pos.	#	Name	Height	Weight	Year	Previous school	Hometown
F	00	Frank Mitchell	6 ft 8 in (2.03 m)	260 lb (118 kg)	RS Jr	Oakville Prep; Canisius	Toronto, ON
G	1	Isaac Asuma	6 ft 3 in (1.91 m)	196 lb (89 kg)	Fr	Cherry	Cherry, MN
G	2	Mike Mitchell Jr.	6 ft 2 in (1.88 m)	185 lb (84 kg)	Sr	Archbishop Mitty; Pepperdine	San Jose, CA
F	3	Dawson Garcia	6 ft 11 in (2.11 m)	234 lb (106 kg)	Sr	Prior Lake; North Carolina	Savage, MN
F	4	Kadyn Betts	6 ft 8 in (2.03 m)	225 lb (102 kg)	RS So	Central	Pueblo, CO
F/C	5	Trey Edmonds	6 ft 10 in (2.08 m)	250 lb (113 kg)	Sr	George Washington; UTSA	Aurora, CO
G	6	Caleb Williams	6 ft 2 in (1.88 m)	200 lb (91 kg)	Sr	Wild Rose; Macalester College	Wild Rose, WI
G	7	Max Sheridan (W)	6 ft 0 in (1.83 m)	175 lb (79 kg)	So	St. Monica Prep	Los Angeles, CA
F	10	Grayson Grove (redshirt)	6 ft 9 in (2.06 m)	220 lb (100 kg)	Fr	Alexandria	Alexandria, MN
G	11	Femi Odukale	6 ft 6 in (1.98 m)	215 lb (98 kg)	GS	Springfield Commonwealth; New Mexico State	Brooklyn, NY
F	12	Erick Reader (W)	6 ft 8 in (2.03 m)	215 lb (98 kg)	So	New Life Academy	Bloomington, MN
F	23	Parker Fox	6 ft 8 in (2.03 m)	220 lb (100 kg)	GS	Mahtomedi; Northern State	Mahtomedi, MN
G	24	Brennan Rigsby	6 ft 3 in (1.91 m)	185 lb (84 kg)	Sr	Wasatch Academy; Oregon	De Beque, CO
G	25	Lu'Cye Patterson	6 ft 2 in (1.88 m)	202 lb (92 kg)	RS Sr	Minnesota Prep; Charlotte	Minneapolis, MN
G	28	Tyler Cochran	6 ft 3 in (1.91 m)	225 lb (102 kg)	Sr	Bolingbrook; Toledo	Bolingbrook, IL
F	54	Lincoln Meister (W)	6 ft 9 in (2.06 m)	240 lb (109 kg)	GS	John Marshall; Minnesota Duluth	Rochester, MN

Head coach

- Ben Johnson (Minnesota)

Assistant coach(es)

- Dave Thorson (Hamline)
- Jason Kemp (UW–La Crosse)
- Marcus Jenkins (Air Force)
- Josh Adel (Florida)

Legend

- (C) Team captain
- (S) Suspended
- (I) Ineligible
- (W) Walk-on
- Injured
- Current redshirt

Roster

== Schedule and results ==
Date time, TV	Rank^{#}	Opponent^{#}	Result	Record	High points	High rebounds	High assists	Site (attendance) city, state
Exhibition
October 19, 2024*; 12:00 p.m., B1G+		Bemidji State	W 90–65		19 – Mitchell Jr.	7 – Mitchell	8 – Tied	Williams Arena (7,534); Minneapolis, MN
October 29, 2024*; 7:00 p.m., B1G+		Hamline	W 79–57		16 – Rigsby	7 – Edmonds	5 – Asuma	Williams Arena (8,027); Minneapolis, MN
Regular season
November 6, 2024*; 7:00 p.m., B1G+		Oral Roberts	W 80–57	1–0	30 – Garcia	8 – Garcia	9 – Mitchell Jr.	Williams Arena (6,975); Minneapolis, MN
November 9, 2024*; 2:30 p.m., Peacock		Omaha	W 68–64	2–0	24 – Garcia	7 – Garcia	6 – Patterson	Williams Arena (8,019); Minneapolis, MN
November 13, 2024*; 7:00 p.m., B1G+		North Texas	L 51–54	2–1	24 – Garcia	8 – Garcia	3 – Odukale	Williams Arena (7,743); Minneapolis, MN
November 16, 2024*; 3:00 p.m., BTN		Yale	W 59–56	3–1	24 – Garcia	7 – Mitchell	6 – Patterson	Williams Arena (8,205); Minneapolis, MN
November 19, 2024*; 6:00 p.m., BTN		Cleveland State	W 58–47	4–1	18 – Fox	12 – Odukale	4 – Garcia	Williams Arena (7,051); Minneapolis, MN
November 25, 2024*; 7:00 p.m., B1G+		Central Michigan	W 68–65	5–1	22 – Garcia	11 – Garcia	6 – Asuma	Williams Arena (7,349); Minneapolis, MN
November 28, 2024*; 11:00 a.m., ESPN2		vs. Wichita State; ESPN Events Invitational semifinals	L 66–68 ^{OT}	5–2	14 – Patterson	10 – Asuma	8 – Odukale	State Farm Field House; Bay Lake, FL
November 29, 2024*; 11:00 a.m., ESPN2		vs. Wake Forest; ESPN Events Invitational consolation game	L 51–57	5–3	12 – Patterson	6 – Fox	4 – Patterson	State Farm Field House; Bay Lake, FL
December 1, 2024*; 2:00 p.m., B1G+		Bethune–Cookman	W 79–62	6–3	23 – Garcia	7 – Odukale	6 – Asuma	Williams Arena (7,314); Minneapolis, MN
December 4, 2024; 7:30 p.m., BTN		Michigan State	L 72–90	6–4 (0–1)	18 – Garcia	11 – Garcia	4 – Patterson	Williams Arena (8,424); Minneapolis, MN
December 9, 2024; 5:30 p.m., BTN		at Indiana	L 67–82	6–5 (0–2)	22 – Garcia	4 – Tied	4 – Odukale	Simon Skjodt Assembly Hall (17,222); Bloomington, IN
December 21, 2024*; 1:00 p.m., BTN		Fairleigh Dickinson	W 74–60	7–5	18 – Tied	10 – Garcia	5 – Tied	Williams Arena (8,949); Minneapolis, MN
December 29, 2024*; 1:00 p.m., Peacock		Morgan State	W 90–68	8–5	22 – Mitchell Jr.	8 – Garcia	6 – Patterson	Williams Arena (8,107); Minneapolis, MN
January 2, 2025; 7:00 p.m., FS1		No. 20 Purdue	L 61–81	8–6 (0–3)	20 – Garcia	8 – Patterson	4 – Odukale	Williams Arena (9,754); Minneapolis, MN
January 6, 2025; 8:00 p.m., FS1		Ohio State	L 88–89 ^{2OT}	8–7 (0–4)	21 – Fox	6 – Tied	4 – Tied	Williams Arena (7,611); Minneapolis, MN
January 10, 2025; 6:00 p.m., Peacock		at Wisconsin	L 59–80	8–8 (0–5)	22 – Garcia	10 – Garcia	4 – Odukale	Kohl Center (14,239); Madison, WI
January 13, 2025; 5:30 p.m., BTN		at Maryland	L 71–77	8–9 (0–6)	21 – Garcia	8 – Odukale	4 – Fox	Xfinity Center (10,271); College Park, MD
January 16, 2025; 6:00 p.m., FS1		No. 20 Michigan	W 84–81 ^{OT}	9–9 (1–6)	27 – Garcia	12 – Garcia	7 – Odukale	Williams Arena (8,877); Minneapolis, MN
January 21, 2025; 8:00 p.m., BTN		at Iowa	W 72–67	10–9 (2–6)	20 – Garcia	8 – Odukale	4 – Tied	Carver–Hawkeye Arena (8,004); Iowa City, IA
January 25, 2025; 3:00 p.m., BTN		No. 15 Oregon	W 77–69	11–9 (3–6)	31 – Garcia	11 – Fox	10 – Mitchell Jr.	Williams Arena (11,062); Minneapolis, MN
January 28, 2025; 7:00 p.m., Peacock		at No. 7 Michigan State	L 51–73	11–10 (3–7)	21 – Garcia	5 – Garcia	5 – Odukale	Breslin Center (14,797); East Lansing, MI
February 1, 2025; 11:00 a.m., BTN		Washington	L 68–71	11–11 (3–8)	28 – Garcia	7 – Mitchell	5 – Odukale	Williams Arena (9,202); Minneapolis, MN
February 4, 2025; 6:00 p.m., BTN		at Penn State	W 69–61	12–11 (4–8)	19 – Garcia	14 – Garcia	3 – Tied	Bryce Jordan Center (6,750); State College, PA
February 8, 2025; 5:00 p.m., BTN		No. 23 Illinois	L 74–95	12–12 (4–9)	24 – Patterson	6 – Garcia	5 – Odukale	Williams Arena (10,091); Minneapolis, MN
February 15, 2025; 3:00 p.m., BTN		at USC	W 69–66	13–12 (5–9)	25 – Patterson	12 – Mitchell	4 – Mitchell Jr.	Galen Center (6,426); Los Angeles, CA
February 18, 2025; 9:30 p.m., FS1		at UCLA	W 64–61	14–12 (6–9)	32 – Garcia	8 – Garcia	4 – Odukale	Pauley Pavilion (7,523); Los Angeles, CA
February 22, 2025; 1:00 p.m., BTN		Penn State	L 60–69	14–13 (6–10)	15 – Odukale	10 – Garcia	4 – Tied	Williams Arena (11,292); Minneapolis, MN
February 25, 2025; 6:00 p.m., Peacock		Northwestern	L 63–75	14–14 (6–11)	26 – Garcia	9 – Garcia	5 – Odukale	Williams Arena (8,890); Minneapolis, MN
March 1, 2025; 1:00 p.m., BTN		at Nebraska	W 67–65	15–14 (7–11)	20 – Rigsby	9 – Mitchell	5 – Tied	Pinnacle Bank Arena (15,749); Lincoln, NE
March 5, 2025; 7:30 p.m., BTN		No. 12 Wisconsin	L 67–74	15–15 (7–12)	18 – Rigsby	11 – Mitchell	4 – Patterson	Williams Arena (14,625); Minneapolis, MN
March 9, 2025; 12:00 p.m., BTN		at Rutgers	L 67–75 ^{OT}	15–16 (7–13)	19 – Garcia	11 – Mitchell	4 – Tied	Jersey Mike's Arena (8,000); Piscataway, NJ
Big Ten tournament
March 12, 2025; 2:30 p.m., Peacock	(12)	vs. (13) Northwestern; First round	L 64–72	15–17	22 – Dawson	7 – Tied	4 – Odukale	Gainbridge Fieldhouse; Indianapolis, IN
*Non-conference game. ^{#}Rankings from AP poll. (#) Tournament seedings in parentheses. All times are in Central Time.
