= 2025–26 Washington Huskies men's basketball team =

College basketball team season

2025–26 Washington Huskies men's basketball
- Conference: Big Ten Conference
- Record: 16–17 (7–13 Big Ten)
- Head coach: Danny Sprinkle (2nd season)
- Assistant coaches: Andy Hill (2nd season); DeMarlo Slocum (2nd season); Tommy Connor (2nd season); Quincy Pondexter (4th season)
- Home arena: Alaska Airlines Arena

2025–26 Big Ten Conference men's basketball standings
	Conf.				Overall
Team	W		L	PCT	W		L	PCT
No. 1 Michigan	19	–	1	.950	37	–	3	.925
No. 14 Nebraska	15	–	5	.750	28	–	7	.800
No. 5 Illinois	15	–	5	.750	28	–	9	.757
No. 11 Michigan State	15	–	5	.750	27	–	8	.771
No. 25 Wisconsin	14	–	6	.700	24	–	11	.686
No. 6 Purdue †	13	–	7	.650	30	–	9	.769
UCLA	13	–	7	.650	24	–	12	.667
Ohio State	12	–	8	.600	21	–	13	.618
No. 15 Iowa	10	–	10	.500	24	–	13	.649
Indiana	9	–	11	.450	18	–	14	.563
Minnesota	8	–	12	.400	15	–	18	.455
USC	7	–	13	.350	18	–	14	.563
Washington	7	–	13	.350	16	–	17	.485
Rutgers	6	–	14	.300	14	–	20	.412
Northwestern	5	–	15	.250	15	–	19	.441
Oregon	5	–	15	.250	12	–	20	.375
Maryland	4	–	16	.200	12	–	21	.364
Penn State	3	–	17	.150	12	–	20	.375
† 2026 Big Ten tournament winner Rankings from AP poll

The 2025–26 Washington Huskies men's basketball team represented the University of Washington in the 2025–26 NCAA Division I men's basketball season. The Huskies, led by second-year head coach Danny Sprinkle, played their home games at Alaska Airlines Arena at Hec Edmundson Pavilion in Seattle, Washington as second-year members of the Big Ten Conference.

== Previous season ==
The Huskies finished the 2024–25 season 13–18, 4–16 in Big Ten play to finish in last place. They failed to qualify for the Big Ten tournament.

== Offseason ==
=== Departures ===
Washington departures
Name	Number	Pos.	Height	Weight	Year	Hometown	Reason for departure
Mekhi Mason	0	G	6'5"	195	Junior	Gilbert, AZ	Transferred to Wake Forest
Great Osobor	1	F	6'8"	245	Senior	Bradford, England	Graduated, signed with Science City Jena
DJ Davis	4	G	6'1"	175	Graduate student	Moreno Valley, CA	Graduated; signed with BC Margveti
Chris Conway	5	F	6'9"	221	Senior	Naperville, IL	Graduated
Tyree Ihenacho	6	G	6'4"	190	Senior	Prior Lake, MN	Graduated
Christian King	7	F	6'8"	215	Sophomore	Kirkland, WA	Transferred to Montana State
Tyler Harris	8	G	6'8"	190	Sophomore	Hayward, CA	Transferred to Vanderbilt
Will Landram	10	F	6'5"	168	Sophomore	Gig Harbor, WA	Walk-on; transferred to St. Thomas Aquinas
Luis Kortright	12	G	6'3"	200	Senior	Manhattan, NY	Graduated
Jase Butler	13	G	6'4"	180	Freshman	San Anselmo, CA	Transferred to Colorado State
Dylan Mansour	20	G	6'3"	180	Freshman	Lafayette, CA	Walk-on; not on team roster; transferred to Chapman
KC Ibekwe	24	C	6'10"	287	Junior	Coquitlam, BC	Transferred to Pacific
Wilhelm Breidenbach	32	F	6'10"	232	Senior	Rancho Santa Margarita, CA	Transferred to Grand Canyon
Sam Slutske	33	G	6'2"	174	Junior	Santa Monica, CA	Walk-on; TBD

=== Incoming transfers ===
Washington incoming transfers
Name	Number	Pos.	Height	Weight	Year	Hometown	Previous school
Quimari Peterson	0	G	6'1"	190	Graduate student	Gary, IN	East Tennessee State
Desmond Claude	1	G	6'6"	205	Senior	New Haven, CT	USC
Christian Nitu	7	F	6'11'	220	Sophomore	Whitby, ON	Florida State
Bryson Tucker	8	F	6'7"	207	Sophomore	Arlington, VA	Indiana
Wesley Yates III	9	G	6'4"	200	(redshirt) Sophomore	Beaumont, TX	USC
Mady Traore	14	C	7'0"		Junior	Paris, France	Frank Phillips College
Lathan Sommerville	24	C	6'10"	275	Sophomore	Peoria, IL	Rutgers
Jacob Ognacevic	41	F	6'8"	220	Graduate student	Sheboygan, WI	Lipscomb

=== 2025 recruiting class ===
College recruiting
Name	Hometown	School	Height	Weight	Commit date
J.J. Mandaquit #10 PG	Honolulu, HI	Utah Prep	6 ft 1 in (1.85 m)	196 lb (89 kg)	Nov 12, 2024
J.J. Mandaquit #10 PG	Recruit ratings: Rivals: 247Sports: ESPN: (85)				
Courtland Muldrew #33 SG	Bentonville, AR	Har Ber High School	6 ft 3 in (1.91 m)	175 lb (79 kg)	Oct 8, 2024
Courtland Muldrew #33 SG	Recruit ratings: Rivals: 247Sports: ESPN: (82)				
Jasir Rencher #33 SF	Oakland, CA	Archbishop Riordan High School	6 ft 6 in (1.98 m)	180 lb (82 kg)	Apr 11, 2025
Jasir Rencher #33 SF	Recruit ratings: Rivals: 247Sports: ESPN: (80)				
Hannes Steinbach; SF	Germany	N/A	6 ft 9 in (2.06 m)	220 lb (100 kg)	Apr 3, 2025
Hannes Steinbach; SF	Recruit ratings: Rivals: 247Sports: ESPN: (NR)				
Brandon Roy Jr. PG	Seattle, WA	Garfield High School	6 ft 2 in (1.88 m)	160 lb (73 kg)	Jun 23, 2025
Brandon Roy Jr. PG	Recruit ratings: Rivals: 247Sports: ESPN: (NR)				
Overall recruit ranking: Rivals: 38 247Sports: 46
Note: In many cases, Scout, Rivals, 247Sports, On3, and ESPN may conflict in their listings of height and weight.; In these cases, the average was taken. ESPN grades are on a 100-point scale.; Sources: "2025 Washington Commits". Rivals.; "ESPN- Washington Huskies Men's Basketball Recruiting". ESPN.; "2025 Team Ranking". Rivals.

== Roster ==
2025–26 Washington Huskies men's basketball team
Players
Coaches

Pos.	#	Name	Height	Weight	Year	Previous school	Hometown
G	0	Quimari Peterson	6 ft 1 in (1.85 m)	190 lb (86 kg)	GS	East Tennessee State	Gary, IN
G	1	Desmond Claude	6 ft 6 in (1.98 m)	205 lb (93 kg)	Sr	USC	New Haven, CT
G	3	BJ Roy	6 ft 2 in (1.88 m)	160 lb (73 kg)	Fr	Garfield	Seattle, WA
F	4	Jasir Rencher	6 ft 5 in (1.96 m)	180 lb (82 kg)	Fr	Archbishop Riordan	Oakland, CA
G	5	Zoom Diallo	6 ft 4 in (1.93 m)	180 lb (82 kg)	So	Curtis	Tacoma, WA
F	6	Hannes Steinbach	6 ft 11 in (2.11 m)	220 lb (100 kg)	Fr	Würzburg Baskets	Würzburg, Germany
F	7	Christian Nitu	6 ft 11 in (2.11 m)	220 lb (100 kg)	So	Florida State	Whitby, Canada
F	8	Bryson Tucker	6 ft 7 in (2.01 m)	207 lb (94 kg)	So	Indiana	Arlington, VA
G	9	Wesley Yates III	6 ft 4 in (1.93 m)	200 lb (91 kg)	RS So	USC	Beaumont, TX
C	11	Franck Kepnang	6 ft 11 in (2.11 m)	253 lb (115 kg)	GS	Oregon	Yaoundé, Cameroon
F	14	Mady Traoré	6 ft 11 in (2.11 m)	195 lb (88 kg)	Jr	Frank Phillips College	Paris, France
G	23	JJ Mandaquit	6 ft 1 in (1.85 m)	175 lb (79 kg)	Fr	Utah Prep Academy	Hilo, HI
C	24	Lathan Sommerville	6 ft 10 in (2.08 m)	275 lb (125 kg)	So	Rutgers	Peoria, IL
G	30	Courtland Muldrew	6 ft 3 in (1.91 m)	170 lb (77 kg)	Fr	Har Ber	Arlington, TX
F	41	Jacob Ognacevic	6 ft 8 in (2.03 m)	220 lb (100 kg)	GS	Lipscomb	Sheboygan, WI

Head coach

- Danny Sprinkle (Montana State)

Assistant coach(es)

- Andy Hill (Eastern Washington)
- Tony Bland (San Diego State)
- DeMarlo Slocum (Georgia Southern)
- Tommy Connor (Utah)
- Quincy Pondexter (Washington)

Legend

- (C) Team captain
- (S) Suspended
- (I) Ineligible
- (W) Walk-on
- Injured
- Current redshirt

Roster

== Schedule and results ==
Date time, TV	Rank^{#}	Opponent^{#}	Result	Record	High points	High rebounds	High assists	Site (attendance) city, state
Exhibition
October 19, 2025*; 12:00 p.m., B1G+		UNLV	W 77–62		22 – Steinbach	16 – Steinbach	12 – Mandaquit	Alaska Airlines Arena (6,774); Seattle, WA
Regular season
November 3, 2025*; 8:00 p.m., B1G+		Arkansas–Pine Bluff	W 94–50	1–0	21 – Steinbach	10 – Tucker	8 – Mandaquit	Alaska Airlines Arena (5,577); Seattle, WA
November 6, 2025*; 7:00 p.m., BTN		Denver	W 84–70	2–0	13 – Tied	16 – Steinbach	7 – Mandaquit	Alaska Airlines Arena (5,134); Seattle, WA
November 9, 2025*; 5:30 p.m., ESPN		at Baylor	L 69–78	2–1	15 – Diallo	15 – Steinbach	2 – Tied	Foster Pavilion (6,542); Waco, TX
November 14, 2025*; 8:00 p.m., ESPN+		at Washington State; Rivalry	W 81–69	3–1	26 – Yates III	13 – Steinbach	4 – Diallo	Beasley Coliseum (5,320); Pullman, WA
November 18, 2025*; 6:30 p.m., Peacock/NBCSN		Southern; Acrisure Series on-campus game	W 99–93 ^{2OT}	4–1	23 – Yates III	12 – Kepnang	3 – Mandaquit	Alaska Airlines Arena (5,564); Seattle, WA
November 27, 2025*; 1:30 p.m., CBSSN		vs. Nevada; Acrisure Holiday Classic semifinal	W 83–66	5–1	25 – Yates III	8 – Sommerville	6 – Mandaquit	Acrisure Arena; Thousand Palms, CA
November 28, 2025*; 1:30 p.m., TruTV		vs. Colorado; Acrisure Holiday Classic championship	L 68–81	5–2	18 – Peterson	9 – Kepnang	6 – Mandaquit	Acrisure Arena; Thousand Palms, CA
December 3, 2025; 8:00 p.m., BTN		UCLA	L 80–82	5–3 (0–1)	29 – Steinbach	10 – Steinbach	4 – Tied	Alaska Airlines Arena (6,700); Seattle, WA
December 6, 2025; 3:00 p.m., BTN		at No. 24 USC	W 84–76	6–3 (1–1)	24 – Steinbach	16 – Steinbach	4 – Tied	Galen Center (5,338); Los Angeles, CA
December 13, 2025*; 3:00 p.m., BTN		Southern Utah	W 105–69	7–3	14 – Tied	7 – Kepnang	5 – Tied	Alaska Airlines Arena (5,516); Seattle, WA
December 19, 2025*; 8:30 p.m., ESPN2		at Seattle; Rivalry	L 66–70	7–4	24 – Claude	12 – Steinbach	4 – Claude	Climate Pledge Arena (4,299); Seattle, WA
December 22, 2025*; 7:00 p.m., BTN		San Diego	W 86–56	8–4	21 – Steinbach	14 – Steinbach	4 – Tied	Alaska Airlines Arena (7,953); Seattle, WA
December 29, 2025*; 8:00 p.m., FS1		Utah	W 74–65	9–4	24 – Diallo	11 – Steinbach	7 – Diallo	Alaska Airlines Arena (7,721); Seattle, WA
January 4, 2026; 5:00 p.m., BTN		at Indiana	L 80–90	9–5 (1–2)	20 – Steinbach	10 – Steinbach	7 – Diallo	Simon Skjodt Assembly Hall (12,392); Bloomington, IN
January 7, 2026; 5:30 p.m., BTN		at No. 5 Purdue	L 73–81	9–6 (1–3)	17 – Steinbach	10 – Kepnang	8 – Diallo	Mackey Arena (14,876); West Lafayette, IN
January 11, 2026; 3:00 p.m., Peacock/NBCSN		Ohio State	W 81–74	10–6 (2–3)	22 – Diallo	9 – Steinbach	5 – Mandaquit	Alaska Airlines Arena (8,163); Seattle, WA
January 14, 2026; 7:30 p.m., BTN		No. 4 Michigan	L 72–82	10–7 (2–4)	15 – Mandaquit	14 – Steinbach	2 – Tied	Alaska Airlines Arena (9,294); Seattle, WA
January 17, 2026; 3:00 p.m., BTN		No. 12 Michigan State	L 63–80	10–8 (2–5)	18 – Diallo	9 – Steinbach	5 – Diallo	Alaska Airlines Arena (7,882); Seattle, WA
January 21, 2026; 6:00 p.m., BTN		at No. 7 Nebraska	L 66–76	10–9 (2–6)	21 – Steinbach	12 – Steinbach	6 – Diallo	Pinnacle Bank Arena (15,203); Lincoln, NE
January 25, 2026; 12:00 p.m., Peacock		Oregon	W 72–57	11–9 (3–6)	12 – Tied	14 – Kepnang	4 – Steinbach	Alaska Airlines Arena (7,346); Seattle, WA
January 29, 2026; 6:00 p.m., FS1		at No. 9 Illinois	L 66–75	11–10 (3–7)	15 – Steinbach	12 – Steinbach	10 – Diallo	State Farm Center (15,544); Champaign, IL
January 31, 2026; 5:00 p.m., BTN		at Northwestern	W 76–62	12–10 (4–7)	22 – Tied	14 – Steinbach	6 – Diallo	Welsh–Ryan Arena (5,587); Evanston, IL
February 4, 2026; 8:00 p.m., BTN		Iowa	L 74–84	12–11 (4–8)	20 – Steinbach	12 – Steinbach	12 – Diallo	Alaska Airlines Arena (6,904); Seattle, WA
February 7, 2026; 7:00 p.m., FS1		at UCLA	L 73–77	12–12 (4–9)	21 – Yates III	9 – Tucker	7 – Tied	Pauley Pavilion (7,080); Los Angeles, CA
February 11, 2026; 7:30 p.m., BTN		Penn State	L 60–63	12–13 (4–10)	19 – Steinbach	14 – Steinbach	3 – Tied	Alaska Airlines Arena (7,306); Seattle, WA
February 14, 2026; 6:00 p.m., Peacock		Minnesota	W 69–57	13–13 (5–10)	26 – Steinbach	9 – Steinbach	4 – Diallo	Alaska Airlines Arena (6,651); Seattle, WA
February 21, 2026; 12:00 p.m., Peacock		at Maryland	L 60–64	13–14 (5–11)	19 – Diallo	5 – Kepnang	5 – Diallo	Xfinity Center (12,480); College Park, MD
February 24, 2026; 3:30 p.m., BTN		at Rutgers	W 79–72	14–14 (6–11)	24 – Steinbach	16 – Steinbach	6 – Yates III	Jersey Mike's Arena (8,000); Piscataway, NJ
February 28, 2026; 1:00 p.m., FS1		Wisconsin	L 73–90	14–15 (6–12)	22 – Steinbach	11 – Steinbach	4 – Diallo	Alaska Airlines Arena (8,755); Seattle, WA
March 4, 2026; 7:30 p.m., BTN		USC	W 91–72	15–15 (7–12)	26 – Diallo	24 – Steinbach	4 – Muldrew	Alaska Airlines Arena (8,121); Seattle, WA
March 7, 2026; 8:00 p.m., FS1		at Oregon	L 79–85	15–16 (7–13)	26 – Steinbach	13 – Steinbach	4 – Muldrew	Matthew Knight Arena (7,472); Eugene, OR
Big Ten tournament
March 11, 2026; 11:30 a.m., Peacock/NBCSN	(12)	vs. (13) USC; Second round	W 83–79 ^{OT}	16–16	22 – Diallo	11 – Steinbach	11 – Diallo	United Center (15,661); Chicago, IL
March 12, 2026; 11:30 a.m., BTN	(12)	vs. (5) No. 23 Wisconsin; Third round	L 82–85	16–17	25 – Steinbach	16 – Steinbach	7 – Diallo	United Center (16,157); Chicago, IL
*Non-conference game. ^{#}Rankings from AP Poll. (#) Tournament seedings in parentheses. All times are in Pacific Time.

== See also ==
- 2025–26 Washington Huskies women's basketball team
