= Quimari Peterson =

American basketball player

Personal information
- Born: November 20, 2001 (age 25) Gary, Indiana, , U.S.
- Listed height: 6 ft 1 in (1.85 m)
- Listed weight: 170 lb (77 kg)

Career information
- High school: West Side (Gary, Indiana)
- College: Indiana State (2021–2022); John A. Logan (2022–2023); East Tennessee State (2023–2025); Washington (2025–2026)
- NBA draft: 2026: undrafted
- Playing career: 2026–present
- Position: Point guard

Career highlights
- SoCon Player of the Year (2025); First-team All-SoCon (2025); NJCAA champion (2023)

Quimari Peterson is an American professional basketball player. He played college basketball for the Indiana State Sycamores, John A. Logan Volunteers, East Tennessee State Buccaneers and Washington Huskies.

== College Career ==
Peterson attended West Side Leadership Academy in Gary, Indiana. As a senior, he averaged 14.0 points, 4.3 rebounds, and 4.0 assists per game before committing to play college basketball at Indiana State University. After playing sparingly as a freshman with Indiana State, he transferred to John A. Logan College. As a sophomore, he averaged 13.5 points and 4.7 rebounds per game, helping lead the Volunteers to a NJCAA Division I national championship, before transferring for a second time to East Tennessee State University. In his first season with the Buccaneers, he made an instant impact, averaging 13.5 points and 3.7 assists per game. The following season, he emerged as the team's leading scorer. At the end of the season, he was named Southern Conference Player of the Year.

On April 3, 2025, Peterson announced his decision to transfer to the University of Washington to play for the Washington Huskies.

== Professional Career ==
On July 1, 2026, he signed with Limburg United of the BNXT League. He departed prior to the beginning of the season without playing a competitive match.

== Career statistics ==
Legend
GP	Games played	GS	Games started	MPG	Minutes per game
FG%	Field goal percentage	3P%	3-point field goal percentage	FT%	Free throw percentage
RPG	Rebounds per game	APG	Assists per game	SPG	Steals per game
BPG	Blocks per game	PPG	Points per game	**Bold**	Career high

=== College ===
Year	Team	GP	GS	MPG	FG%	3P%	FT%	RPG	APG	SPG	BPG	PPG
2021–22	Indiana State	4	0	8.8	.273	.000	.000	1.5	.5	.5	.0	1.5
2022–23	John A. Logan	35	35	8.4	.528	.390	.731	4.7	4.7	2.4	.3	13.5
2023–24	East Tennessee State	35	35	31.9	.393	.286	.716	4.5	3.7	1.7	.3	13.5
2024–25	East Tennessee State	32	32	34.5	.468	.422	.733	4.5	3.7	2.0	.2	19.5
2025–26	Washington	33	18	30.9	.389	.350	.781	2.8	2.2	1.3	.2	9.2
