= Piedmont High School (North Carolina) =

American public school in North Carolina

- View southwesterly from Piedmont HS toward Monroe, NC via NASA World Wind in 2010

Location
- 3006 Sikes Mill Road; Monroe, North Carolina 28110; United States; 35°05′43″N 80°29′28″W

Information
- Motto: "Piedmont Academics Character Excellence" (PACE)
- Established: 1960 (66 years ago)
- School district: Union County Public Schools
- CEEB code: 342663
- Principal: Dylan Stamey
- Teaching staff: 66.07 (FTE)
- Enrollment: 1,304 (2023–2024)
- Student to teacher ratio: 19.74
- Colors: Columbia blue, navy, and red
- Athletics: NCHSAA 6A
- Athletics conference: Southern Carolina 6A/7A
- Website: phs.ucpsnc.org

Piedmont High School is a public high school in Unionville, North Carolina, United States. The mascot of the school is the Panther, and the current principal is Dylan Stamey. The school's motto is the acronym PACE, standing for "Piedmont Academics Character Excellence."

== History ==
Piedmont was founded in 1960 as the second high school in Union County. According to local historian Mrs. Dawn Stegall, the land upon which the school is built was worked by enemy prisoners of war from nearby Camp Sutton during World War II. After 2005, school enrollment was divided due to the newly built Porter Ridge High School. Country music star Trace Adkins spoke at Piedmont's 50th graduating class ceremony on June 14, 2010.

== Athletics ==
Piedmont is a member of the North Carolina High School Athletic Association (NCHSAA) and are classified as a 6A school. The school is a part of the Southern Carolina 6A/7A Conference. Piedmont's school colors are columbia blue, navy, and red, and its team name are the Panthers.

NCHSAA State Championships
Sport	Year(s)
Baseball	1984 (2A), 2013 (2A)
Wrestling Dual Team	2012 (2A), 2017 (3A), 2018 (3A)
Wrestling State Tournament Team	1987 (1A/2A), 2018 (3A), 2019 (3A)

== Notable alumni ==
- Andy Tomberlin (1984), former MLB player and scout
- Cade Tyson (2022, transferred), college basketball player
- Hunter Tyson (2018), NBA player for the Denver Nuggets
