= Cade Tyson =

American basketball player (born 2003)

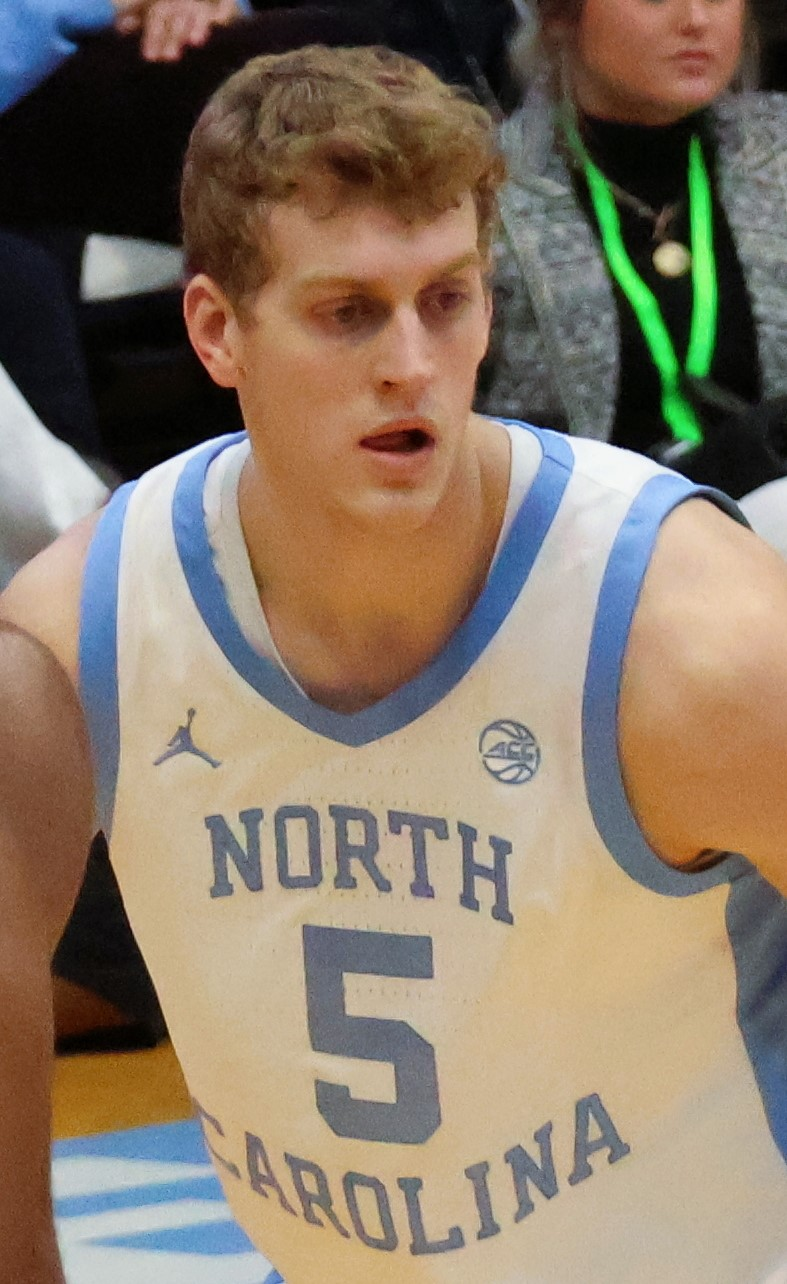
- Tyson with North Carolina in 2025

Minnesota Golden Gophers
- Position: Shooting guard / small forward
- League: Big Ten Conference

Personal information
- Born: August 11, 2003 (age 23) Monroe, North Carolina, U.S.
- Listed height: 6 ft 7 in (2.01 m)
- Listed weight: 195 lb (88 kg)

Career information
- High school: Piedmont (Monroe, North Carolina); Carmel Christian (Charlotte, North Carolina)
- College: Belmont (2022–2024); North Carolina (2024–2025); Minnesota (2025–present)

Career highlights
- Second-team All-MVC (2024); MVC Freshman of the Year (2023); North Carolina Mr. Basketball (2022)

Cade Washington Tyson (born August 11, 2003) is an American college basketball player for the Minnesota Golden Gophers of the Big Ten Conference. He previously played for the Belmont Bruins and North Carolina Tar Heels.

== Early life and high school ==
Tyson was born and raised in Monroe, North Carolina and attended Piedmont High School before transferring to Carmel Christian School after his sophomore year. He was named North Carolina Mr. Basketball as a senior after averaging 24 points, 8 rebounds, 3 assists and 1.9 steals per game as a senior. Tyson committed to play college basketball at Belmont.

== College career ==
=== Belmont ===
Tyson averaged 13.6 points and 4.6 rebounds per game and was named the Missouri Valley Conference (MVC) Freshman of the Year during his first season with Belmont. He was named second-team All-MVC as a 16.2 points and 5.9 rebounds per game as a sophomore. After the 2023–24 season, he entered the NCAA transfer portal.

=== North Carolina ===
He transferred to North Carolina after leaving Belmont. He averaged 2.6 points and 1.1 rebounds over 31 games in a limited role during the 2024–25 season. Tyson re-entered the NCAA transfer portal at the end of the season.

=== Minnesota ===
Tyson committed to transfer to Minnesota for the 2025–26 season. He started 32 games for Minnesota, leading the team with 19.6 points per game, and adding 5.4 rebounds and 2.1 assists per game. In September 2026, Tyson officially rejoined Minnesota for his fifth season, while legally contesting his eligibility for the 2026–27 season.

== Career statistics ==
Legend
| GP | Games played | GS | Games started | MPG | Minutes per game |
| FG% | Field goal percentage | 3P% | 3-point field goal percentage | FT% | Free throw percentage |
| RPG | Rebounds per game | APG | Assists per game | SPG | Steals per game |
| BPG | Blocks per game | PPG | Points per game | **Bold** | Career high |

=== College ===
| Year | Team | GP | GS | MPG | FG% | 3P% | FT% | RPG | APG | SPG | BPG | PPG |
|---|---|---|---|---|---|---|---|---|---|---|---|---|
| 2022–23 | Belmont | 30 | 28 | 29.1 | .490 | .417 | **.859** | 4.6 | .9 | **1.0** | .4 | 13.6 |
| 2023–24 | Belmont | **31** | **31** | 31.6 | .493 | **.465** | .855 | **5.9** | 1.6 | .9 | **.6** | 16.2 |
| 2024–25 | North Carolina | **31** | 0 | 7.9 | .403 | .292 | .563 | 1.1 | .1 | .2 | .0 | 2.6 |
| 2025–26 | Minnesota | **31** | **31** | **36.6** | **.500** | .422 | .826 | 5.4 | **2.2** | .7 | .2 | **19.6** |
| Career | | 123 | 90 | 26.3 | .489 | .423 | .829 | 4.2 | 1.2 | .7 | .3 | 13.0 |

== Personal life ==
Tyson's older brother, Hunter Tyson, is also a professional basketball player, and had a brief stint with the Denver Nuggets of National Basketball Association (NBA).
