= Rodney Rice =

Rodney Rice may refer to:

- Rodney Rice (American football) (born 1966), American football player
- Rodney Rice (basketball) (born 2002), American college basketball player
- Rodney Rice (broadcaster) (1944–2021), Northern Irish radio broadcaster and journalist
