= Andy Tomberlin =

American baseball player (born 1966)

Regensburg Legionäre – No. 33
- Outfielder / Coach
- Born: November 7, 1966 (age 59); Monroe, North Carolina, U.S.
- Batted: Left Threw: Left

MLB debut
- August 12, 1993, for the Pittsburgh Pirates

Last MLB appearance
- June 21, 1998, for the Detroit Tigers

MLB statistics
- Batting average: .233
- Home runs: 11
- Runs batted in: 38
- Stats at Baseball Reference

Teams
- Pittsburgh Pirates (1993); Boston Red Sox (1994); Oakland Athletics (1995); New York Mets (1996–1997); Detroit Tigers (1998)

Andy Lee Tomberlin (born November 7, 1966) is an American former professional baseball outfielder. He played in Major League Baseball (MLB) for five different teams between the 1993 and 1998 seasons. Listed at 5 ft 11 in (1.80 m), 160 lbs, he batted and threw left-handed. Currently, he is the hitting coach for the Regensburg Legionäre of the Baseball-Bundesliga.

== Early life ==
Tomberlin attended Piedmont High School in Monroe, North Carolina. He played on the school's baseball team, helping them win the 1984 North Carolina 2A State Championship.

== Professional career ==
A hard-throwing pitcher converted to full-time outfielder, Tomberlin entered the majors in 1993 with the Pittsburgh Pirates, playing for them one year before joining the Boston Red Sox (1994), Oakland Athletics (1995), New York Mets (1996–1997) and Detroit Tigers (1998). His most productive season came in 1995 with Oakland, when he posted career-numbers in home runs (4), runs (15), RBI (10) and stolen bases (4), while hitting a .212 batting average in 46 games. Then, with the 1996 Mets he hit .258 in a career-high 63 games.

In a six-season career, Tomberlin was a .233 hitter (71-for-305) with 11 home runs and 38 RBI in 192 games, including six doubles, two triples and six stolen bases.

Tomberlin also played from 1986 through 2000 in the minor leagues for eight different organizations, hitting .292 with 110 home runs and 473 RBI in 1048 games. As a pitcher, he posted a 7–2 record with a 4.01 ERA in 33 minor league appearances.

== Coaching career ==
Following his playing career, Tomberlin served as a scout for the Milwaukee Brewers (2001–02), and has coached in the minors for the High Desert Mavericks (2003–04), Winston-Salem Warthogs (2005), Birmingham Barons (2006, 2009–2011), Kannapolis Intimidators (2007–2008) and Charlotte Knights (2014–2018). Following his time at the Charlotte Knights, he worked as park director at Noel Williams Park until 2021.
