= Darius Adams (basketball, born 2006) =

American basketball player (born 2006)

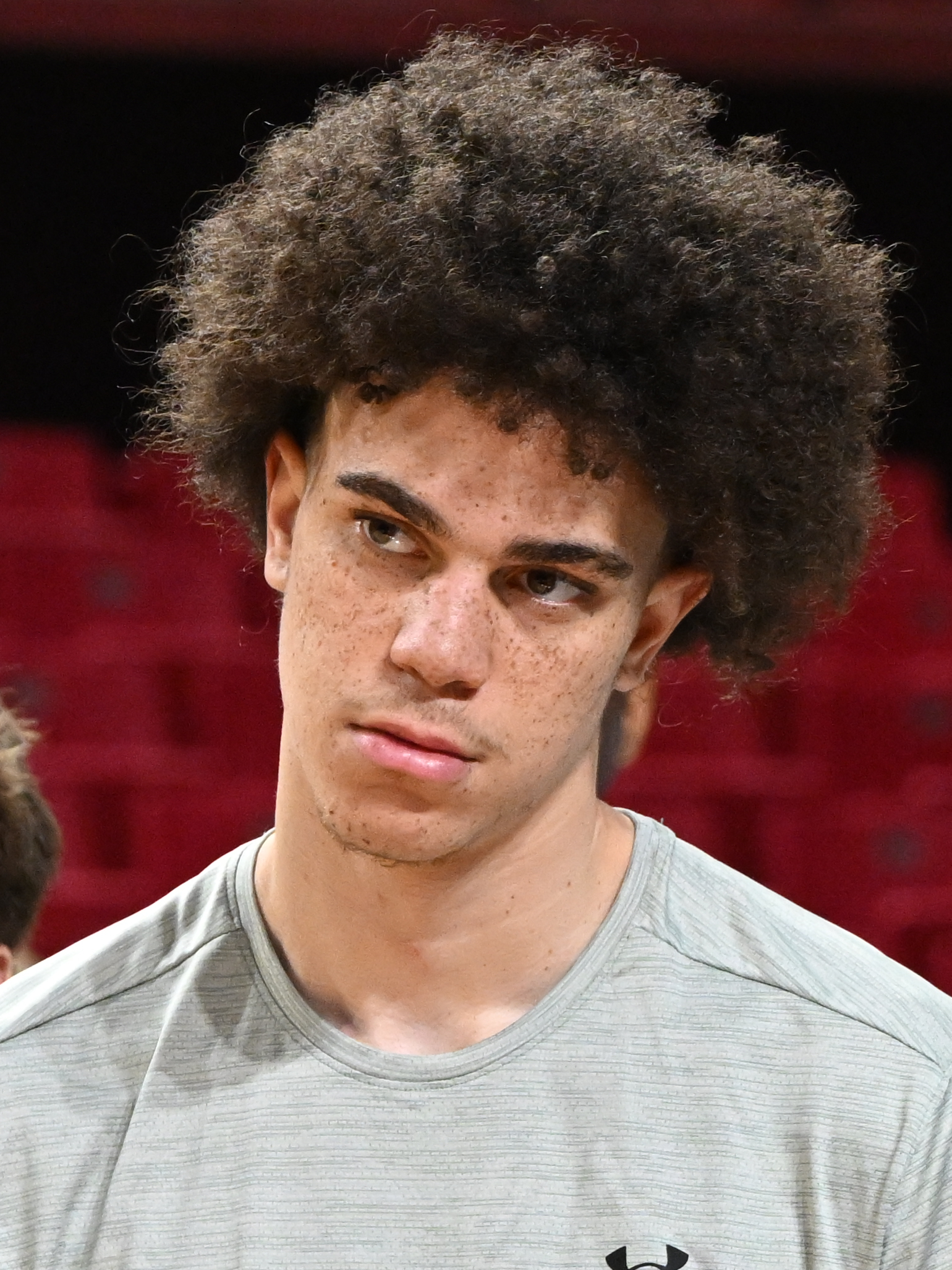
- Adams in 2026

No. 11 – NC State Wolfpack
- Position: Shooting guard
- Conference: Atlantic Coast Conference

Personal information
- Born: June 7, 2006 (age 20)
- Listed height: 6 ft 5 in (1.96 m)
- Listed weight: 190 lb (86 kg)

Career information
- High school: Manasquan (Manasquan, New Jersey); La Lumiere School (La Porte, Indiana)
- College: Maryland (2025–2026); NC State (2026–present)

Career highlights
- McDonald's All-American (2025)

Darius Adams (born June 7, 2006) is an American college basketball player for the NC State Wolfpack of the Atlantic Coast Conference (ACC). He previously played for the Maryland Terrapins.

== Early life and high school ==
Adams grew up in Manchester Township, New Jersey and initially attended Manasquan High School. As a sophomore he averaged averaged 20.4 points, 7.8 rebounds, and 2.9 assists and led the Warriors to their first-ever state championship. After the season, Adams transferred to La Lumiere School in La Porte, Indiana. He was selected to play in the 2025 McDonald's All-American Boys Game during his senior year.

Adams was rated a consensus top-30 prospect in the 2025 recruiting class. He originally committed to play college basketball at UConn over offers from Michigan State and Tennessee. In April 2025, Adams requested a release from his National Letter of Intent and reopened his recruitment. He later signed to play at Maryland.

== College career ==
Adams underwent surgery shortly before the beginning of his freshman season with the Maryland Terrapins. He averaged 10.8 points, 3.4 rebounds and 1.6 assists per game. Following the season Adams transferred to NC State.
