= Dave Thorson =

American basketball coach

Current position
- Title: Assistant coach
- Team: Minnesota
- Conference: Big Ten

Biographical details
- Education: Hamline University (1989)

Coaching career (HC unless noted)
- 1989-1990: South Dakota (GA)
- 1990–1994: Minnesota (assistant)
- 1994–2016: DeLaSalle High School
- 2016–2017: Drake (assistant)
- 2017–2021: Colorado State (assistant)
- 2021–present: Minnesota (assistant)

Accomplishments and honors

Championships
- 9x MN Boys' HS Basketball State Champion

Dave Thorson is an American basketball coach who is currently an assistant coach for the University of Minnesota.

== Early life ==
Thorson played high school basketball for Fargo South High School, helping the team to its first state tournament berth in 17 years. He was a two-time All-Conference player for two seasons and played in the Lions All-Star game. The school inducted Thorson into its Hall of Fame in 2015. He later played college basketball at Hamline University in St. Paul, Minnesota.

== Career ==
Thorson spent the 1989-1990 season as a graduate assistant for the University of South Dakota. He then served as an assistant coach at the University of Minnesota for four seasons.

In 1994 Thorson was hired as a social studies teacher and head basketball coach at DeLaSalle High School in Minneapolis, Minnesota. In 1997 he also became the school's Director of Student Activities, and in 2004 he became Vice President for Development.

Over 23 seasons as DeLaSalle's head boys’ basketball coach, Thorson has won nine state titles (a state record among boys’ or girls’ coaches), while earning 15 appearances in the state tournament and compiling a career record of 527–136. Under Thorson's tenure, DeLaSalle won six straight Class AAA championships (2012–17), another Minnesota high school record for most consecutive state titles. Thorson also coached the Islanders to championships in 1998, 1999, and 2006.

Thorson was hired in 2016 to be an assistant coach to Niko Medved at Drake University. Together, the two coached the Bulldogs to their first winning mark in Missouri Valley Conference play in 10 years, posting a 17-17 overall season record (10-8 in the Conference). A year later, Thorson followed Medved to be an assistant on his staff at Colorado State University.

In April 2021, Thorson returned to the University of Minnesota as an assistant coach to Ben Johnson. Johnson had previously played for Thorson while he was a student at DeLaSalle.

== Personal life ==
Thorson is married and has one daughter.
