= Desmond Claude =

American basketball player

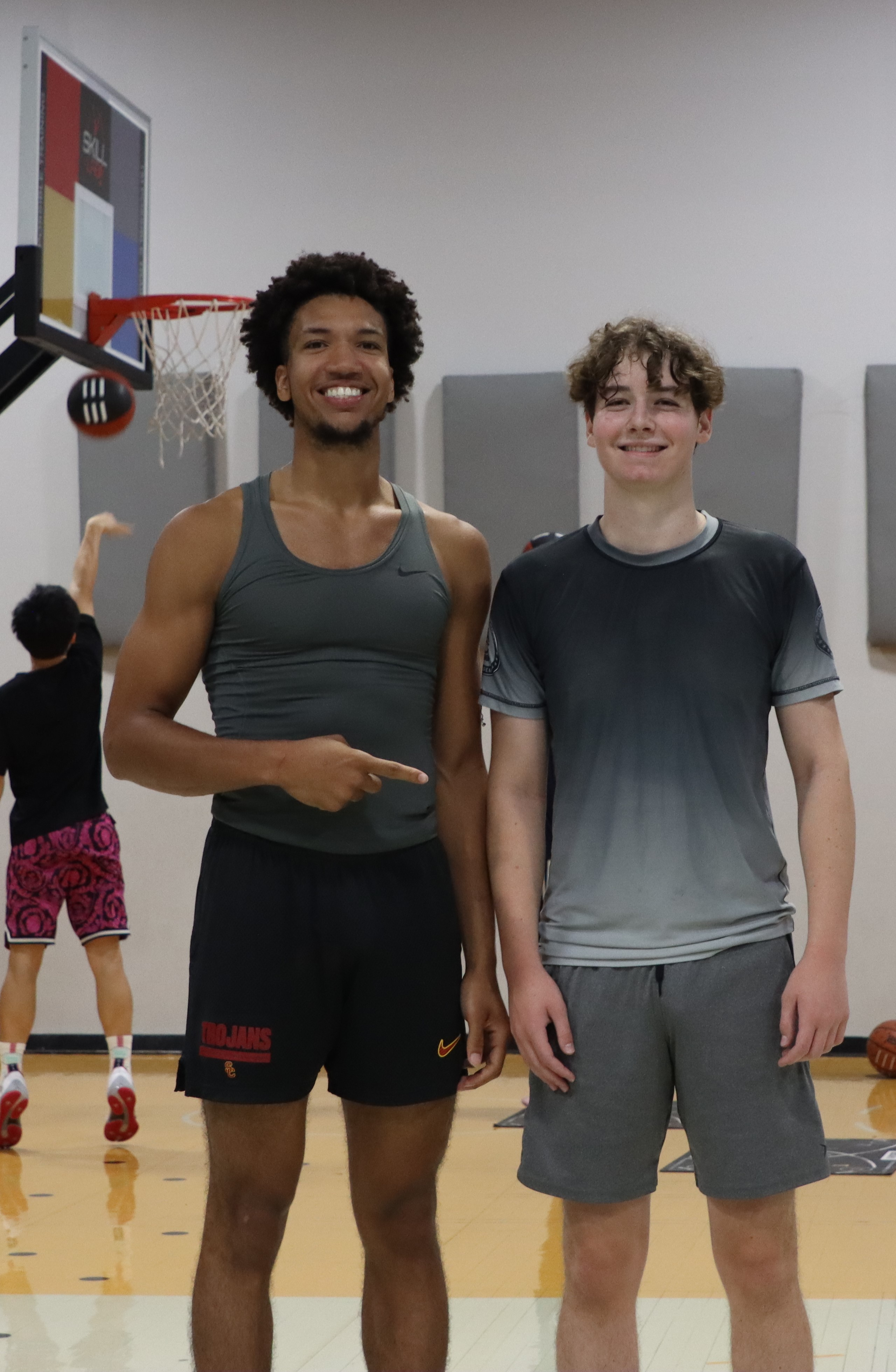
- Desmond Claude (Left) in Michigan in 2024

Personal information
- Born: May 30, 2003 (age 23) Syracuse, New York, U.S.
- Listed height: 6 ft 6 in (1.98 m)
- Listed weight: 201 lb (91 kg)

Career information
- High school: Hillhouse (New Haven, Connecticut); Putnam Science Academy (Putnam, Connecticut)
- College: Xavier (2022–2024); USC (2024–2025); Washington (2025–2026)
- NBA draft: 2026: undrafted
- Position: Point guard / shooting guard

Career highlights
- Big East Most Improved Player (2024); Big East All-Freshman Team (2023)

Desmond Allen Claude (born May 30, 2003) is an American basketball player. He played college basketball for the Xavier Musketeers, USC Trojans and Washington Huskies.

== Early life and high school career ==
Claude was born in Syracuse, New York, and grew up in New Haven, Connecticut. He initially attended Hillhouse High School before transferring to Putnam Science Academy for his senior season. Claude played AAU for Todd Quarles at Expressions Elite. Claude was rated a four-star recruit and committed to playing college basketball for Xavier over offers from Kansas and Louisville. He reaffirmed his commitment to Xavier after head coach Travis Steele who recruited Claude was fired.

== College career ==
Claude was a key reserve during his freshman season. His playing time increased over the course of the season and he scored at least ten points in five of the Musketeers' last 11 games. Claude was named to the Big East Conference All-Freshman team after averaging 4.7 points, 2.5 rebounds, and 1.8 assists per game. Claude started all 34 Musketeers' games as a sophomore averaging 16.6 points, 4.2 rebounds and 3.2 assists per game. Claude was named the Big East Conference Most Improved Player and Led the Big East Conference in scoring for the month of March 2024. Following the season he transferred to USC.

On June 8, 2025, Desmond Claude announced that he was transferring from USC to Washington.

== Personal life ==
Claude's mother, Paula Moore, played college basketball at Syracuse University and his father, Chris Rivers, played at Fairfield University.
