= Ben Johnson (basketball) =

American college basketball coach (born 1980)

Orlando Magic
- Position: Assistant coach
- League: NBA

Personal information
- Born: December 23, 1980 (age 45) Minneapolis, Minnesota, U.S.

Career history

Playing
- 1999–2001: Northwestern
- 2002–2004: Minnesota

Coaching
- 2005–2006: Dayton (GA)
- 2006–2008: Texas–Pan American (assistant)
- 2008–2012: Northern Iowa (assistant)
- 2012–2013: Nebraska (assistant)
- 2013–2018: Minnesota (assistant)
- 2018–2021: Xavier (assistant)
- 2021–2025: Minnesota
- 2026–present: Orlando Magic (assistant)

Benjamin Johnson (born December 23, 1980) is an American professional basketball coach, currently an assistant coach for the Orlando Magic of the National Basketball Association (NBA). He played basketball for the Northwestern Wildcats and Golden Gophers before becoming an assistant coach for several major college programs. From 2021–2025, he served as the head coach of the Minnesota Golden Gophers.

== Playing career ==
Johnson led DeLaSalle High School to two Minnesota state championships and was a two-time first-team all state selection in basketball. He then played two years for the Northwestern University Wildcats before transferring home to the University of Minnesota, where he played his two final seasons for the Golden Gophers and finished with 533 points in 59 games.

== Coaching career ==
After graduating from the University of Minnesota with a degree in sociology in 2005 Johnson worked as a graduate assistant at the University of Dayton. Following Dayton, Johnson became an assistant at the University of Texas–Pan American where he was heavily involved in recruiting and backcourt development. Following UTPA Johnson became an assistant under Ben Jacobson at Northern Iowa. Following that, he worked under Tim Miles for one season at the University of Nebraska.

=== Minnesota (assistant) ===
In 2013, Johnson returned to his alma mater to become an assistant under then-head coach Richard Pitino. At Minnesota, Johnson continued his previous success as a standout recruiter and player developer. With his strong recruiting efforts and local ties to the area, Johnson was able to recruit Minnesota Prep standouts Amir Coffey, Daniel Oturu, and Gabe Kalscheur to stay home and play for the Gophers. Johnson was also a key factor in the recruitment and development of Jordan Murphy who broke many Gopher records during his career.

=== Xavier (assistant) ===
In 2018, following 5 years at Minnesota Johnson accepted a new assistant position under Travis Steele at Xavier. While at Xavier, Johnson helped land back to back top 30 ranked recruiting classes. Those classes included high ranked prospects such as Zach Freemantle and Colby Jones. At Xavier Johnson once again was tasked with the development of backcourt players. During his time as an assistant at Xavier, the team went a combined 51–37.

=== Minnesota ===
On March 22, 2021, Johnson was announced as the new head basketball coach for the University of Minnesota Golden Gophers. Johnson was the 18th head coach in the program's history. On March 13, 2025, he was fired following the team's loss in the Big Ten Tournament.

=== Orlando Magic (assistant) ===
On July 6, 2026, Johnson was announced as an assistant coach for the Orlando Magic under newly appointed head coach and fellow Minnesota native Sean Sweeney.

== Head coaching record ==
Record table
Season	Team	Overall	Conference	Standing	Postseason
Minnesota Golden Gophers (Big Ten Conference) (2021–2025)
2021–22	Minnesota	13–17	4–16	T–13th	
2022–23	Minnesota	9–22	2–17	14th	
2023–24	Minnesota	19–15	9–11	T–9th	NIT Second Round
2024–25	Minnesota	15–17	7–13	T–12th	
Minnesota:		56–71 (.441)	22–57 (.278)		
Total:		56–71 (.441)			
National champion Postseason invitational champion Conference regular season champion Conference regular season and conference tournament champion Division regular season champion Division regular season and conference tournament champion Conference tournament champion
