= Wesley Yates III =

American basketball player

No. 9 – Washington Huskies
- Position: Point guard / shooting guard
- League: Big Ten Conference

Personal information
- Born: January 6, 2005 (age 21)
- Listed height: 6 ft 4 in (1.93 m)
- Listed weight: 201 lb (91 kg)

Career information
- High school: Beaumont United (Beaumont, Texas)
- College: Washington (2023–2024); USC (2024–2025); Washington (2025–present)

Wesley Eugene Yates III (born January 6, 2005) is an American college basketball player for the Washington Huskies of the Big Ten Conference. He previously played for the USC Trojans.

== Early life and high school ==
Yates attended Beaumont United High School, where he averaged 20 points per game his senior season and was named the Beaumont Enterprise Player of the Year. Coming out of high school, he was rated as the 37th overall player in the class of 2023 and committed to play college basketball for the Washington Huskies.

== College career ==
=== Washington ===
Yates missed his entire freshman season in 2023–24 due to a foot injury and took a redshirt. After the season, he entered his name into the NCAA transfer portal.

=== USC ===
Yates transferred to play for the USC Trojans. On December 7, 2024, he made his first collegiate start where he scored 19 points in an 85-61 win at Washington. On January 14, 2025, Yates played 40 minutes, where he notched 21 points and four assists in a 99-89 win over Iowa.

=== Washington (second stint) ===
On April 5, 2025, he entered his name into the transfer portal again. On April 10, he announced he would be returning to Washington, where he began his collegiate career.

== Personal life ==
Yates is the cousin of former NBA player and current college coach Quincy Pondexter.
