= Pharrel Payne =

American basketball player (born 2004)

No. 21 – Maryland Terrapins
- Position: Power forward / center
- League: Big Ten Conference

Personal information
- Born: August 22, 2004 (age 22)
- Listed height: 6 ft 9 in (2.06 m)
- Listed weight: 250 lb (113 kg)

Career information
- High school: Park (Cottage Grove, Minnesota)
- College: Minnesota (2022–2024); Texas A&M (2024–2025); Maryland (2025–present)

Pharrel Payne (born August 22, 2004) is an American college basketball player for the Maryland Terrapins of the Big Ten Conference. He previously played for the Texas A&M Aggies and the Minnesota Golden Gophers.

== Early life and high school ==
Payne attended Park High School. As a junior, he averaged 15 points and 10 rebounds per game. Coming out of high school, Payne committed to play college basketball for the Minnesota Golden Gophers over offers from schools such as Texas A&M, St. Louis, and Drake.

== College career ==
=== Minnesota ===
As a freshman in 2022-23, Payne averaged 8.2 points and 5.2 rebounds per game and led the team in blocks with 32. On January 12, 2024, he recorded 17 points, ten rebounds, and five blocks in a loss to Indiana. On February 3, 2024, Payne tallied 14 points, nine rebounds, and four blocks in a win over Northwestern. On February 18, he notched a career-high 21 points and 11 rebounds in victory versus Rutgers. During the 2023-24 season, Payne appeared in 32 games with 19 starts, where he averaged 10.0 points and 6.1 rebounds per game. After the season, he entered his name into the NCAA transfer portal.

=== Texas A&M ===
Payne transferred to play for the Texas A&M Aggies. On November 4, 2024, he recorded 15 points and six rebounds in a loss to UCF. In the first round of the 2025 NCAA Division I men's basketball tournament, Payne notched 25 points and 10 rebounds in a win over Yale. He averaged 10.4 points and 5.1 rebounds per game. At the end of the season, Payne entered the transfer portal, then followed head coach Buzz Williams to Maryland.

=== Maryland ===
Payne transferred to the University of Maryland for the 2025-26 season, his senior season. His signing was officially announced by Maryland on May 1, 2025. In 10 games, he averaged 17.5 points, 1.4 assists, 7.2 rebounds, and 1.1 blocks per game.

== Personal life ==
His younger brother, Roderick Payne currently plays at Western Illinois, and previously played at Wisconsin River-Falls where he was the 2021-22 Wisconsin Intercollegiate Athletic Conference Rookie of the Year.
