= Alijah Arenas =

American basketball player (born 2007)

No. 0 – USC Trojans
- Position: Shooting guard
- League: Big Ten Conference

Personal information
- Born: March 16, 2007 (age 19) Oakland, California, U.S.
- Listed height: 6 ft 7 in (2.01 m)
- Listed weight: 199 lb (90 kg)

Career information
- High school: Chatsworth (Los Angeles, California)
- College: USC (2025–present)

Career highlights
- McDonald's All-American (2025)

Alijah Amani Arenas (born March 16, 2007) is an American college basketball player for the USC Trojans of the Big Ten Conference.

== Early life and high school ==
Arenas was born in Oakland, California and grew up in the Woodland Hills neighborhood of Los Angeles, California. He attended Chatsworth High School. He averaged 33 points and 8.6 rebounds per game as a sophomore. Arenas reclassified midway through his junior year from the class of 2026 to the class of 2025. He was selected to play in the 2025 McDonald's All-American Boys Game.

== College career ==
Arenas was rated a consensus five-star recruit in both the 2026 class and the 2025 class after his reclassification. He committed to play college basketball at USC over offers from Arizona, Kansas, Kentucky, and Louisville.

On July 23, 2025, it was announced that Arenas would miss 6-to-8 months due to a torn meniscus that required surgery. He made his debut for the Trojans in January 2026. Following his freshman season, Arenas declared for the 2026 NBA draft before withdrawing and returning to school.

== Personal life ==
Arenas is the son of former NBA All-Star Gilbert Arenas.

On April 24, 2025, it was reported that Arenas was involved in a serious car crash and was hospitalized and placed into an induced coma. According to a Los Angeles Fire Department public information officer, officials responded to a call at 4:55 a.m. after a Tesla Cybertruck crashed into a tree/fire hydrant with fire involved. The LAFD did not identify the person involved but said that the 18-year-old driver was out of the vehicle and that he was transported to the hospital in serious condition. Sources confirmed that Arenas was involved in the crash and told ESPN that initial tests showed he did not suffer broken bones.
