= Jacob Cofie =

American basketball player (born 2006)

No. 5 – USC Trojans
- Position: Power forward
- League: Big Ten Conference

Personal information
- Born: February 7, 2006 (age 20) Seattle, Washington, U.S.
- Listed height: 6 ft 10 in (2.08 m)
- Listed weight: 231 lb (105 kg)

Career information
- High school: Eastside Catholic School (Sammamish, Washington)
- College: Virginia (2024–2025); USC (2025–present)

Career highlights
- Washington Mr. Basketball (2024)

Jacob Cofie (born February 7, 2006) is an American college basketball player for the USC Trojans of the Big Ten Conference. He previously played for the Virginia Cavaliers.

== Early life and high school ==
Cofie attended Eastside Catholic School in Sammamish, Washington. As a junior, he averaged 20.9 points, 11 rebounds, and 5.2 assists per game. As a senior, Cofie averaged 21.9 points, 12.2 rebounds, 6.3 assists, and 2.3 steals per game and was named the Washington Gatorade Player of the Year. Coming out of high school, he was rated as a four-star recruit and committed to play college basketball for the Virginia Cavaliers.

== College career ==
=== Virginia ===
In his Cavalier debut on November 6, 2024, Cofie totaled 16 points, six rebounds, an assists, a steal, and a block in a victory over Campbell. On November 11, he notched 11 points, 11 rebounds, four steals, three blocks, and two assists in a win over Coppin State. On January 25, 2025, Cofie scored a career-high 17 points in a loss to Notre Dame. On February 22, he recorded nine points, three rebounds, and two steals in a loss against North Carolina. During his freshman season in 2024-25, Cofie appeared in 32 games with 16 starts, where he averaged 7.2 points, 4.6 rebounds, and 1.1 steals per game. After the season, he entered his name into the NCAA transfer portal.
