= Rodney Rice (basketball) =

American basketball player

No. 1 – USC Trojans
- Position: Shooting guard
- League: Big Ten Conference

Personal information
- Born: November 21, 2002 (age 23) Takoma Park, Maryland, U.S.
- Listed height: 6 ft 5 in (1.96 m)
- Listed weight: 199 lb (90 kg)

Career information
- High school: DeMatha Catholic (Hyattsville, Maryland)
- College: Virginia Tech (2022–2023); Maryland (2024–2025); USC (2025–present)

Rodney Rice (born November 21, 2002) is an American college basketball player for the USC Trojans. He previously played for the Maryland Terrapins and the Virginia Tech Hokies.

== Early life and high school ==
Rice attended DeMatha Catholic High School. Coming out of high school, Rice was rated as a four-star recruit and committed to play college basketball for the Virginia Tech Hokies over offers from schools such as Louisville, Notre Dame, Alabama, Georgetown, and Maryland.

== College career ==
=== Virginia Tech ===
In the second round of the 2023 ACC men's basketball tournament, Rice notched 17 points versus NC State. In his freshman season in 2022-23, he appeared in just eight games due to hand and ankle injuries, where he averaged 7.4 points and 3.3 rebounds per game. Rice opted out of the 2023-24 season and did not appear in any games during the year, after which he entered his name into the NCAA transfer portal.

=== Maryland ===
Rice transferred to play for the Maryland Terrapins. In his team debut on November 4, 2024, he notched 12 points in a win over Manhattan. On November 8, Rice dropped 28 points in win against Mount St. Mary's. On January 26, 2025, he totaled 23 points and the game-winning three in a one point win against Indiana. On March 14, Rice tallied 26 points and seven threes in a victory versus Illinois. He averaged 13.8 points, 2.2 rebounds, and 2.1 assists per game while shooting 43.4 percent from the field. Following the season Rice entered the transfer portal.

=== USC ===
Rice transferred again to USC Trojans. In six games, he averaged 20.3 points and 6.0 assists per game. On December 17, 2025, Rice was ruled out for the season due to a shoulder injury which required surgery.

On April 10, 2026, Rice announced he'd be returning to USC for his senior season.

== Personal life ==
He is the son of Rodney Rice Sr. who was named the Washington Post Player of the Year in 1983, and played college basketball at Richmond.
