= 2026–27 Michigan Wolverines men's basketball team =

American college basketball season

2026–27 Michigan Wolverines men's basketball
- Conference: Big Ten Conference

Ranking
- Coaches: No. 21
- AP: No. 18т
- Record: 3–2 (0–0 Big Ten)
- Head coach: Mike Boynton (1st season)
- Associate head coach: Mike Martin (1st season)
- Assistant coaches: Akeem Miskdeen (3rd season); Kyle Church (3rd season); Dylan Murphy (1st season); KT Harrell (1st season)
- Home arena: Crisler Center

2026–27 Big Ten Conference men's basketball standings
	Conf.				Overall
Team	W		L	PCT	W		L	PCT
Indiana	0	–	0	–	6	–	0	1.000
Minnesota	0	–	0	–	6	–	0	1.000
No. 24 Nebraska	0	–	0	–	5	–	0	1.000
No. 7 UCLA	0	–	0	–	5	–	0	1.000
No. 18т USC	0	–	0	–	5	–	0	1.000
Washington	0	–	0	–	4	–	0	1.000
No. 10 Illinois	0	–	0	–	5	–	1	.833
No. 2 Michigan State	0	–	0	–	5	–	1	.833
Penn State	0	–	0	–	5	–	1	.833
Oregon	0	–	0	–	3	–	1	.750
Ohio State	0	–	0	–	4	–	2	.667
Purdue	0	–	0	–	4	–	2	.667
Rutgers	0	–	0	–	4	–	2	.667
Wisconsin	0	–	0	–	4	–	2	.667
Iowa	0	–	0	–	3	–	2	.600
Maryland	0	–	0	–	3	–	2	.600
No. 18т Michigan	0	–	0	–	3	–	2	.600
Northwestern	0	–	0	–	3	–	3	.500
† 2027 Big Ten tournament winner As of November 22, 2026; Rankings from AP poll

The 2026–27 Michigan Wolverines men's basketball team represents the University of Michigan during the 2026–27 NCAA Division I men's basketball season. It is the program's 111th season and its 110th consecutive year as a member of the Big Ten Conference. The Wolverines are led by first-year head coach Mike Boynton and play their home games at Crisler Center in Ann Arbor, Michigan.

== Previous season ==
The Wolverines finished the 2025–26 season with a record of 37–3, setting a program record for wins. They finished 19–1 in conference play to win the Big Ten regular season, and set a Big Ten record for conference wins. As the No. 1 seed in the Big Ten tournament, they advanced to the championship and lost to Purdue. The Wolverines received an at-large bid to the NCAA tournament as the No. 1 seed in the Midwest Region, and won the national championship for the second time in program history, and first time since 1989.

== Offseason ==
Trey McKenney and Elliot Cadeau were the first to announce they were returning this season. Oscar Goodman and Ricky Liburd soon after confirmed their plan to return. On April 8, Winters Grady was the first player to enter the NCAA transfer portal. On April 9, Malick Kordel was the second player to enter the transfer portal. That same day, the Wolverines received their first transfer portal commitment from redshirt-junior J. P. Estrella, a forward for the Tennessee Volunteers. He started 13 games and averaged ten points per game the previous season. On April 17, Kordel and Grady both announced they transferred to play for the Minnesota Golden Gophers. On April 23, Michigan received their second transfer portal commitment from Jalen Reed, a graduate student and forward from the LSU Tigers. Reed suffered season-ending injuries the previous two seasons, playing in only 14 games and averaging just over ten points per game.

On April 24, Aday Mara, Morez Johnson Jr. and Cadeau declared early for the 2026 NBA draft, while maintaining their NCAA eligibility through the draft process. That same day, the Wolverines gained their third transfer portal commitment from junior Moustapha Thiam, a 7'2" center from the Cincinnati Bearcats. He started 31 games as a sophomore and averaged 12.8 points, 7.1 rebounds and 1.6 blocks per game. As a freshman, he started 34 games for the UCF Knights and was fourth in the nation in total blocks. On May 16, Cadeau withdrew from the NBA draft. On July 13, L.J. Cason notified the program he would be the lone player to enter the portal following the departure of Dusty May on June 22. He transferred to play for the Miami Hurricanes.

On July 31, following the NCAA expanding eligibility from four to five years, Gayle declared that he would pursue a fifth year of college basketball (despite the 2022 recruiting class not being included in the new rule). On August 19, fifth-year guard Kenny Noland of the Columbia Lions transferred to Michigan, also seeking eligibility. He was second-team All-Ivy League, averaging 17.1 points per game as a senior. Noland had signed a professional contract in Germany with the Artland Dragons in July 2026. On August 31, Gayle filed a lawsuit in the state of New York. As a result, he was granted a temporary restraining order against the NCAA and eligibility. On September 23, Noland was granted a preliminary injunction by an Indiana judge and gained eligibility. The next day, Gayle also received a preliminary injunction.

=== Coaching changes ===
On March 11, 2026, assistant coach Justin Joyner was hired to be the head coach at Oregon State University for the Beavers. Joyner remained with Michigan throughout the 2026 NCAA tournament. On June 22, the day the team was set to convene for the first practice of summer workouts, head coach Dusty May left the program to become the head coach of the Dallas Mavericks. He was officially hired the next day. On June 23, assistant coach and defensive coordinator Mike Boynton replaced May as interim head coach. Due to the coaching change and Michigan hiring an interim head coach from within the program, a 15-day transfer window will open a full 30 days after set hire on July 24. Once again, McKenney and Cadeau were the first to affirm they would remain with the program, despite the exit of May. Over the next two weeks the entire roster confirmed their commitment to remain with the program, with the exception of the injured Cason. On July 10, Boynton was named the official head basketball coach. On July 13, he hired Mike Martin away from Brown, where he had been the head coach since 2012. On July 21, KT Harrell was promoted from director of basketball operations to an assistant coach. On July 31, Boynton hired Dylan Murphy to fill the final assistant coaching role. Murphy was the head coach of the Osceola Magic in the NBA G League from 2023 to 2026, and an assistant with the Orlando Magic prior to that; beginning in 2020.

=== Departures ===
Michigan departures
Name	Number	Pos.	Height	Weight	Year	Hometown	Reason for departure
Yaxel Lendeborg	23	F	6'9"	240	GS	Pennsauken, New Jersey	Declared for NBA draft: selected by Golden State Warriors
Nimari Burnett	4	G	6'5"	195	GS	Chicago, Illinois	Declared for NBA draft: unselected, signed with Toronto Raptors
Will Tschetter	42	F	6'8"	230	GS	Stewartville, Minnesota	Graduated; signed with Warwick Senators (Australia)
Charlie May	12	G	6'5"	190	RS-Jr	Boca Raton, Florida	Graduated; hired by Georgia (assistant coach)
Aday Mara	15	C	7'3"	255	Jr	Zaragoza, Spain	Declared for NBA draft: selected by Oklahoma City Thunder
Morez Johnson Jr.	21	F	6'9"	250	So	Riverdale, Illinois	Declared for NBA draft: selected by Dallas Mavericks
L.J. Cason	2	G	6'2"	195	So	Lakeland, Florida	Transferred to Miami
Winters Grady	10	G	6'6"	210	Fr	Tualatin, Oregon	Transferred to Minnesota
Malick Kordel	32	C	7'2"	275	Fr	Oberhausen, Germany	Transferred to Minnesota

==== Coaching staff departures ====
Michigan coaching staff departures
Name	Position	New team	New position
Dusty May	Head coach	Dallas Mavericks	Head coach
Justin Joyner	Assistant coach	Oregon State	Head coach
Drew Williamson	Assistant coach	Dallas Mavericks	Assistant coach

=== Incoming transfers ===
Michigan incoming transfers
Name	Number	Pos.	Height	Weight	Year	Hometown	Previous Team
J. P. Estrella	13	F	6'11"	240	RS-Jr	Scarborough, Maine	Tennessee
Jalen Reed	9	F	6'10"	245	GS	Jackson, Mississippi	LSU
Moustapha Thiam	52	C	7'2"	250	Jr	Dakar, Senegal	Cincinnati
Kenny Noland	2	G	6'2"	185	GS	Apex, North Carolina	Columbia

=== Recruiting classes ===
On July 8, 2025, Michigan landed its first class of 2026 recruit, center Marcus Engelhardt Møller. He is a Danish native who played basketball in Spain in Liga U for Unicaja Málaga U22 and in the Tercera FEB for Unicaja-Andalucía Málaga. Møller also represented the Danish senior national team in qualifiers for both the EuroBasket 2025 and 2027 FIBA World Cup, where he averaged 4.8 points and 2.5 rebounds per game in eight contests. On September 16, Michigan received their second commitment from four-star forward/center, Quinn Costello. On September 24, the Wolverines received their third commitment from three-star guard/forward, Malachi Brown. On October 1, the Wolverines received their fourth commitment from four-star shooting guard, Joseph Hartman, the son of Carlin Hartman. All four players officially signed their national letter of intent during the early signing period in November 2025. On February 3, Costello was named a 2026 McDonald's All-American.

On February 10, Michigan received their fifth commitment from four-star forward, Lincoln Cosby. He reclassified as a five-star recruit from the class of 2027, namely so he could rehab his ACL at the University of Michigan, which he had surgery on before his commitment. Before enrolling, it was announced he would redshirt this season. On April 4, the Wolverines received their sixth commitment from unanimous five-star guard, Brandon McCoy Jr. He announced his commitment at halftime during the Final Four game between Michigan and Arizona. At the time of his commitment he was a top-20 player by all three recruiting services. He joined Costello as a McDonald's All-American and previously won three gold medals representing the United States at the 2023 FIBA Under-16 Americas Championship, 2024 FIBA Under-17 World Cup and 2025 FIBA Under-19 World Cup. He was teammates with Morez Johnson Jr. in 2025. McCoy finished as the No. 3 overall ranked player in the nation by rivals and No. 10 by 247Sports, making him the highest ranked high school recruit to ever sign with the program by both outlets (since 21st century). Michigan had the No. 2 ranked incoming recruiting class in the nation according to 247Sports (high school and transfer recruits combined).

==== 2026 recruiting class ====
College recruiting
Name	Hometown	School	Height	Weight	Commit date
Brandon McCoy Jr. PG/SG	Oakland, California	Sierra Canyon School	6 ft 5 in (1.96 m)	190 lb (86 kg)	Apr 4, 2026
Brandon McCoy Jr. PG/SG	Recruit ratings: Rivals: 247Sports: ESPN: (91)				
Quinn Costello; PF/C	Medford, Massachusetts	The Newman School	6 ft 10 in (2.08 m)	195 lb (88 kg)	Sep 16, 2025
Quinn Costello; PF/C	Recruit ratings: Rivals: 247Sports: ESPN: (89)				
Lincoln Cosby; SF/PF	Cincinnati, Ohio	Montverde Academy	6 ft 10 in (2.08 m)	205 lb (93 kg)	Feb 10, 2026
Lincoln Cosby; SF/PF	Recruit ratings: Rivals: 247Sports: ESPN: (87)				
Joseph Hartman; SG	Richmond, Virginia	The Rock School	6 ft 6 in (1.98 m)	193 lb (88 kg)	Oct 1, 2025
Joseph Hartman; SG	Recruit ratings: Rivals: 247Sports: ESPN: (82)				
Malachi Brown; SG/SF	Knoxville, Tennessee	Knoxville Catholic	6 ft 5 in (1.96 m)	185 lb (84 kg)	Sep 24, 2025
Malachi Brown; SG/SF	Recruit ratings: Rivals: 247Sports: ESPN: (79)				
Marcus Møller; C	Copenhagen, Denmark	Unicaja Málaga U22	7 ft 3 in (2.21 m)	230 lb (100 kg)	Jul 8, 2025
Marcus Møller; C	Recruit ratings: No ratings found				
Overall recruit ranking: 247Sports: 4 On3: 6 ESPN: 4
Note: In many cases, Scout, Rivals, 247Sports, On3, and ESPN may conflict in their listings of height and weight.; In these cases, the average was taken. ESPN grades are on a 100-point scale.; Sources: "2026 Michigan Wolverines Recruiting Class". ESPN.; "2026 Team Ranking". Rivals.; "2026 Michigan Wolverines". 247Sports.; "2026 Michigan Wolverines". On3.

==== 2027 recruiting class ====
College recruiting (2027)
Name	Hometown	School	Height	Weight	Commit date
Lucai Anderson; PG/SG	Atlanta, Georgia	IMG Academy	6 ft 4 in (1.93 m)	190 lb (86 kg)	Oct 14, 2026
Lucai Anderson; PG/SG	Recruit ratings: Rivals: 247Sports: ESPN: (85)				
Overall recruit ranking: 247Sports: 50
Note: In many cases, Scout, Rivals, 247Sports, On3, and ESPN may conflict in their listings of height and weight.; In these cases, the average was taken. ESPN grades are on a 100-point scale.; Sources: "2027 Michigan Wolverines Recruiting Class". ESPN.; "2027 Team Ranking". Rivals.; "2027 Michigan Wolverines". 247Sports.; "2027 Michigan Wolverines". On3.

== Roster ==
2026–27 Michigan Wolverines men's basketball team
Players
Coaches

Pos.	#	Name	Height	Weight	Year	Previous school	Hometown
G	0	Ricky Liburd	6 ft 5 in (1.96 m)	200 lb (91 kg)	So	Sagemont School	Hollywood, FL
G	1	Trey McKenney	6 ft 4 in (1.93 m)	220 lb (100 kg)	So	St. Mary's Preparatory	Flint, MI
G	2	Kenny Noland	6 ft 2 in (1.88 m)	185 lb (84 kg)	GS	Columbia	Apex, NC
G	3	Elliot Cadeau	6 ft 1 in (1.85 m)	180 lb (82 kg)	Sr	North Carolina	West Orange, NJ
G	4	Brandon McCoy Jr. (injured)	6 ft 5 in (1.96 m)	200 lb (91 kg)	Fr	Sierra Canyon School	Oakland, CA
F	5	Lincoln Cosby (injured)	6 ft 10 in (2.08 m)	215 lb (98 kg)	Fr	Montverde Academy	Cincinnati, OH
G	7	Howard Eisley Jr. (W)	6 ft 0 in (1.83 m)	180 lb (82 kg)	Jr	Archbishop Stepinac HS	New York, NY
F	8	Quinn Costello	6 ft 10 in (2.08 m)	220 lb (100 kg)	Fr	The Newman School	Medford, MA
C	9	Marcus Møller	7 ft 3 in (2.21 m)	230 lb (104 kg)	Fr	Unicaja Málaga U22	Copenhagen, Denmark
G	10	Joseph Hartman (injured)	6 ft 6 in (1.98 m)	200 lb (91 kg)	Fr	The Rock School	Richmond, VA
G	11	Roddy Gayle Jr.	6 ft 5 in (1.96 m)	205 lb (93 kg)	GS	Ohio State	Niagara Falls, NY
F	12	Oscar Goodman	6 ft 7 in (2.01 m)	235 lb (107 kg)	Jr	New Plymouth HS	Ōpunake, New Zealand
F	13	J. P. Estrella	6 ft 11 in (2.11 m)	240 lb (109 kg)	GS	Tennessee	Scarborough, ME
G	15	Malachi Brown	6 ft 6 in (1.98 m)	205 lb (93 kg)	Fr	Knoxville Catholic HS	Knoxville, TN
F	19	Jalen Reed	6 ft 9 in (2.06 m)	245 lb (111 kg)	GS	LSU	Jackson, MS
F	31	Harrison Hochberg (W)	6 ft 7 in (2.01 m)	220 lb (100 kg)	Sr	Cushing Academy	New York, NY
C	52	Moustapha Thiam	7 ft 2 in (2.18 m)	250 lb (113 kg)	Jr	Cincinnati	Dakar, Senegal

Head coach

- Mike Boynton (alum: South Carolina)

Assistant coach(es)

- Mike Martin – associate head coach (Brown)
- Akeem Miskdeen – assistant coach / recruiting coordinator (Queens (NC))
- Kyle Church – assistant coach / general manager (Charlotte)
- Dylan Murphy – assistant coach / offensive coordinator (Columbia)
- KT Harrell – assistant coach (Auburn)
- Brandon Gilbert – special assistant (Florida)
- Buzzy Caruthers – director of player development (Hampton)
- Nick Szczechowski – director of basketball operations (Michigan)
- Matt Aldred – strength and conditioning coach (Loughborough)

Legend

- (C) Team captain
- (S) Suspended
- (I) Ineligible
- (W) Walk-on
- Injured
- Current redshirt

Roster

== Regular season ==
=== November ===
==== Oakland ====
On November 2, Michigan began their season with an 84–68 victory over Oakland, winning a 24th consecutive season-opening game. Michigan was led by Roddy Gayle Jr. and Trey McKenney with 17 points each, while J. P. Estrella had 15 points and a career-high 12 rebounds for his first double-double of the season. Freshman Quinn Costello added 13 points off the bench in his collegiate debut.

==== UConn ====
On November 6, Michigan lost to No. 4 UConn 77–85, in a rematch of the 2026 NCAA championship game. Michigan was led by McKenney with a career-high 22 points, while Estrella had 19 points and nine rebounds, and Gayle Jr. added 18 points. Michigan was held scoreless over the final 4:30 of the first half, while UConn closed the half on a 9–0 run. Michigan trailed 30–43 at halftime. Michigan scored on their first two possessions of the second half, before being held scoreless for the next three minutes. UConn used an 8–0 run to extend its lead to 18 points with 16:23 remaining. Michigan outscored UConn 47–42 in the second half, shooting 47.1 percent from the field.

==== Marquette ====
On November 11, Michigan defeated Marquette 84–70. Michigan was led by Estrella led Michigan with 18 points and eight rebounds, while Elliot Cadeau had 17 points and 10 assists for a double-double. McKenney and Costello added 15 points each. Michigan held held Marquette scoreless over the final 4:10 of the first half, forcing nine consecutive missed field goal attempts to enter halftime with a 35–27 lead. After shooting 2-for-11 from three-point range in the first-half, Michigan shot 9-for-16 from three in the second half, including a career-high five three-pointers by Costello.

==== William & Mary ====
On November 15, Michigan defeated William & Mary 123–79. A program-record eight Wolverines scored in double figures, including all five starters and three reserves. Michigan was led by Moustapha Thiam and Costello with 16 points each. Estrella finished with 15 points and seven rebounds, while McKenney added 14 points, five rebounds and five assists. Gayle Jr. had 13 points and eight rebounds, while Cadeau recorded 11 points and 11 assists for his second consecutive double-double. Oscar Goodman added a career-high 11 points and eight rebounds, while Kenny Noland rounded out the double-figure scorers with 11 points. Malachi Brown scored his first career points, and Harrison Hochberg scored his first points of the season late in the second half. Michigan's 123 points tied for the fourth-highest single-game total in program history and was the Wolverines' highest scoring game since March 10, 1990, against Iowa. Michigan's 75 second-half points set a program record for points in a half.

==== Villanova ====
On November 21, Michigan lost to Villanova 73–79. Michigan was led by McKenney with a career-high tying 22 points, while Gayle Jr. added 15 points and seven rebounds, and Cadeau had 11 points and five assists. Michigan reduced a 17-point second-half deficit to four points with under three minutes remaining in the game, however, they were unable to complete the comeback. Villanova's defense forced 16 Michigan turnovers.

== Schedule and results ==
Date time, TV	Rank^{#}	Opponent^{#}	Result	Record	High points	High rebounds	High assists	Site (attendance) city, state
Exhibition
August 23, 2026*; 12:30 p.m., YouTube		at Lithuanian national team Summer Tour	L 84–96	–	17 – Costello	6 – Goodman	7 – Cadeau	Arena Vilnius (1,984); Vilnius, Lithuania
August 24, 2026*; 11:30 a.m., YouTube		at Lithuanian national reserve team Summer Tour	L 77–82	–	19 – Cadeau	8 – Goodman	8 – Cadeau	Utenos Arena (1,114); Utena, Lithuania
August 27, 2026*; 2:00 p.m., YouTube		vs. KK Mega Basket; Summer Tour	W 84–81	–	25 – McKenney	7 – Tied	4 – Goodman	Sports Center Igalo (1,000); Igalo, Montenegro
October 11, 2026*; 2:00 p.m., B1G+		Eastern Michigan	W 87–62	–	21 – McKenney	7 – Cadeau	8 – Cadeau	Crisler Center (7,123); Ann Arbor, MI
October 16, 2026*; 7:00 p.m., B1G+		Oregon State	W 98–93	–	27 – Cadeau	10 – Thiam	8 – Cadeau	Crisler Center (10,091); Ann Arbor, MI
October 25, 2026*; 1:00 p.m., B1G+	No. 16	vs. No. 10 Houston; The Battleground 2k26	L 66–83	–	14 – Gayle Jr.	8 – Thiam	3 – Tied	Van Andel Arena (8,524); Grand Rapids, MI
Regular season
November 2, 2026*; 6:00 p.m., BTN	No. 16	Oakland	W 84–68	1–0	17 – Tied	12 – Estrella	6 – Cadeau	Crisler Center (11,050); Ann Arbor, MI
November 6, 2026*; 8:00 p.m., TNT	No. 16	vs. No. 4 UConn; Naismith Hall of Fame Series Boston	L 77–85	1–1	22 – McKenney	9 – Estrella	3 – Tied	TD Garden (18,053); Boston, MA
November 11, 2026*; 7:00 p.m., FS1	No. 20	Marquette	W 84–70	2–1	18 – Estrella	12 – Thiam	10 – Cadeau	Crisler Center (11,357); Ann Arbor, MI
November 15, 2026*; 2:00 p.m., B1G+	No. 20	William & Mary	W 123–79	3–1	16 – Tied	8 – Tied	11 – Cadeau	Crisler Center (10,838); Ann Arbor, MI
November 21, 2026*; 7:00 p.m., Fox	No. 18т	at Villanova	L 73–79	3–2	22 – McKenney	8 – Thiam	5 – Cadeau	Xfinity Mobile Arena (11,625); Philadelphia, PA
November 24, 2026*; 5:30 p.m., ESPN		vs. Creighton; Players Era 16 Bracket 2 First Round						T-Mobile Arena; Las Vegas, NV
November 26, 2026*; 3:30 p.m., ESPN		vs. Miami or TCU; Players Era 16						T-Mobile Arena; Las Vegas, NV
November 27, 2026*; TBD, ESPN		vs. Alabama, Baylor, Gonzaga or Kansas State; Players Era 16						T-Mobile Arena; Las Vegas, NV
December 1, 2026^* 7:00 p.m., BTN		Mississippi Valley State						Crisler Center; Ann Arbor, MI
December 5, 2026*; 12:00 p.m., Peacock		vs. Louisville						Little Caesars Arena; Detroit, MI
December 9, 2026; 6:30 p.m., BTN		at Rutgers						Jersey Mike's Arena; Piscataway, NJ
December 12, 2026; 4:30 p.m., Fox		Northwestern						Crisler Center; Ann Arbor, MI
December 21, 2026*; 4:00 p.m., BTN		Detroit Mercy						Crisler Center; Ann Arbor, MI
December 30, 2026*; 12:00 p.m., BTN		Toledo						Crisler Center; Ann Arbor, MI
January 2, 2027; 2:00 p.m, Fox		Washington						Crisler Center; Ann Arbor, MI
January 5, 2027; 7:00 p.m., Peacock		at Nebraska						Pinnacle Bank Arena; Lincoln, NE
January 8, 2027; 8:00 p.m., Fox		Purdue						Crisler Center; Ann Arbor, MI
January 12, 2027; 6:30 p.m., BTN		Minnesota						Crisler Center; Ann Arbor, MI
January 16, 2027; 1:00 p.m., CBS		at Indiana						Simon Skjodt Assembly Hall; Bloomington, IN
January 19, 2027; 7:00 p.m., Peacock		Oregon						Crisler Center; Ann Arbor, MI
January 23, 2027; 3:00 p.m., NBC		at USC						Galen Center; Los Angeles, CA
January 26, 2027; 10:00 p.m., Peacock		at UCLA						Pauley Pavilion; Los Angeles, CA
January 30, 2027; TBD, Fox		Ohio State; Rivalry						Crisler Center; Ann Arbor, MI
February 6, 2027; TBD, Fox		at Wisconsin						Kohl Center; Madison, WI
February 9, 2027; 7:00 p.m., Peacock		Illinois						Crisler Center; Ann Arbor, MI
February 13, 2027; 1:00 p.m., CBS		Michigan State; Rivalry						Crisler Center; Ann Arbor, MI
February 16, 2027; 8:00 p.m., FS1		at Minnesota						Williams Arena; Minneapolis, MN
February 20, 2027; 1:00 p.m., CBS		Iowa						Crisler Center; Ann Arbor, MI
February 23, 2027; 6:00 p.m., FS1		at Penn State						Bryce Jordan Center; State College, PA
February 28, 2027; 8:00 p.m., Fox		at Michigan State; Rivalry						Breslin Center; East Lansing, MI
March 4, 2027; 6:30 p.m., FS1		Maryland						Crisler Center; Ann Arbor, MI
March 7, 2027; 2:15 p.m., CBS		at Ohio State; Rivalry						Value City Arena; Columbus, OH
*Non-conference game. ^{#}Rankings from AP poll. (#) Tournament seedings in parentheses.^=Cancelled upon advancement to Players Era Championship (11/28). All times are in Eastern Time. Source:

== Rankings ==
Ranking movements Legend: ██ Increase in ranking ██ Decrease in ranking т = Tied with team above or below
	Week																				
Poll	Pre	1	2	3	4	5	6	7	8	9	10	11	12	13	14	15	16	17	18	19	Final
AP	16	20	18т																		
Coaches	20	21	21																		
