= 2026–27 Michigan State Spartans men's basketball team =

American college basketball season

2026–27 Michigan State Spartans men's basketball
- Conference: Big Ten Conference

Ranking
- Coaches: No. 3
- AP: No. 2
- Record: 5–1 (0–0 Big Ten)
- Head coach: Tom Izzo (32nd season)
- Associate head coach: Doug Wojcik (8th overall season)
- Assistant coaches: Thomas Kelley (5th season); Saddi Washington (3rd season); Jon Borovich (3rd season); Austin Thornton (3rd season)
- Home arena: Breslin Center

2026–27 Big Ten Conference men's basketball standings
	Conf.				Overall
Team	W		L	PCT	W		L	PCT
Indiana	0	–	0	–	6	–	0	1.000
Minnesota	0	–	0	–	6	–	0	1.000
No. 24 Nebraska	0	–	0	–	5	–	0	1.000
No. 7 UCLA	0	–	0	–	5	–	0	1.000
No. 18т USC	0	–	0	–	5	–	0	1.000
Washington	0	–	0	–	4	–	0	1.000
No. 10 Illinois	0	–	0	–	5	–	1	.833
No. 2 Michigan State	0	–	0	–	5	–	1	.833
Penn State	0	–	0	–	5	–	1	.833
Oregon	0	–	0	–	3	–	1	.750
Ohio State	0	–	0	–	4	–	2	.667
Purdue	0	–	0	–	4	–	2	.667
Rutgers	0	–	0	–	4	–	2	.667
Wisconsin	0	–	0	–	4	–	2	.667
Iowa	0	–	0	–	3	–	2	.600
Maryland	0	–	0	–	3	–	2	.600
No. 18т Michigan	0	–	0	–	3	–	2	.600
Northwestern	0	–	0	–	3	–	3	.500
† 2027 Big Ten tournament winner As of November 22, 2026; Rankings from AP poll

The 2026–27 Michigan State Spartans men's basketball team represents Michigan State University in the 2026–27 NCAA Division I men's basketball season. The Spartans are led by 32nd-year head coach Tom Izzo and play their home games at Breslin Center in East Lansing, Michigan as members of the Big Ten Conference.

Senior point guard Jeremy Fears Jr. was named to the AP preseason All-American team and was named preseason national player of the year by CBS Sports.

== Previous season ==
The Spartans finished the 2025–26 season 27–8, 15–5 in Big Ten play to finish in a three-way tie for second place. As the No. 3 seed in the Big Ten tournament, they lost to UCLA in the quarterfinals. The Spartans received an at-large bid to the NCAA tournament for the 28th consecutive tournament, the longest current streak in the country. MSU defeated North Dakota State and Louisville to advance to the Sweet Sixteen for 23rd time in school history and the 17th time under Tom Izzo. There they lost to No. 2-seeded UConn.

The Spartans were led by Jeremy Fears Jr. with 15.2 points per game and 9.4 assists per game. Jaxon Kohler averaged 8.9 rebounds per game. Fears was named to several All-American teams.

== Offseason ==
=== Departures ===
On April 10, 2026, Jeremy Fears Jr. announced he would enter the NBA draft while retaining his college eligibility, but withdrew from the draft on May 27. On May 7, guard Divine Ugochukwu announced he was transferring to LSU.

Departures
Name	No.	Pos.	Height	Weight	Year	Hometown	Notes
Carson Cooper	15	C	6'11"	245	Sr	Jackson, MI	Graduated
Trey Fort	9	G	6'4"	200	Sr	Florence, MS	Graduated
Jaxon Kohler	0	F	6'9"	245	Sr	American Fork, UT	Graduated (Transferred to BYU)
Nick Sanders	20	G	5'10"	185	Sr	Franklin, MI	Graduated
Divine Ugochukwu	99	G	6'3"	190	So	Sugar Land, TX	Transferred to LSU
Denham Wojcik	10	G	6'2"	190	GS	Charleston, SC	Graduated

=== Incoming transfers ===
On April 22, 2026, it was announced the Charlotte center Anton Bonke would transfer to MSU.

Transfers
Name	No.	Pos.	Height	Weight	Year	Hometown	Previous school
Anton Bonke	34	C	7'2"	260	Jr	Port Vila, Vanuatu	Charlotte

=== Recruiting classes ===
==== 2026 recruiting class ====
On July 25, 2025, four-star point guard Carlos Medlock Jr. announced he would attend MSU in 2026. On October 1, four-star wing Julius Avent revealed he too would play for the Spartans in 2026. On November 5, four-star shooting guard Jasiah Jervis committed to MSU. On November 14, five-star center Ethan Taylor announced he too would play for Michigan State in 2026.

College recruiting
Name	Hometown	School	Height	Weight	Commit date
Julius Avent; PF	Oradell, NJ	Bergen Catholic High School	6 ft 7 in (2.01 m)	220 lb (100 kg)	November 13, 2025 (signed)
Julius Avent; PF	Recruit ratings: Rivals: 247Sports: ESPN:				
Jasiah Jervis; SG	White Plains, NY	Archbishop Stepinac	6 ft 4 in (1.93 m)	190 lb (86 kg)	November 13, 2025 (signed)
Jasiah Jervis; SG	Recruit ratings: Rivals: 247Sports: ESPN:				
Carlos Medlock Jr. PG	Branson, MO	Link Academy	5 ft 11 in (1.80 m)	165 lb (75 kg)	November 13, 2025 (signed)
Carlos Medlock Jr. PG	Recruit ratings: Rivals: 247Sports: ESPN:				
Ethan Taylor; C	Branson, MO	Link Academy	7 ft 0 in (2.13 m)	244 lb (111 kg)	November 14, 2025 (verbal)
Ethan Taylor; C	Recruit ratings: Rivals: 247Sports: ESPN:				
Overall recruit ranking:
Note: In many cases, Scout, Rivals, 247Sports, On3, and ESPN may conflict in their listings of height and weight.; In these cases, the average was taken. ESPN grades are on a 100-point scale.; Sources:

==== 2027 recruiting class ====
On September 11, 2026, top 20 prospect Antonio Pemberton, a point guard, committed to MSU.

College recruiting (2027)
Name	Hometown	School	Height	Weight	Commit date
Antonio Pemberton; PG	Hanover, MA	Masters Academy International	6 ft 1 in (1.85 m)	165 lb (75 kg)	September 11, 2026 (verbal)
Antonio Pemberton; PG	Recruit ratings: Rivals: 247Sports: ESPN:				
Overall recruit ranking:
Note: In many cases, Scout, Rivals, 247Sports, On3, and ESPN may conflict in their listings of height and weight.; In these cases, the average was taken. ESPN grades are on a 100-point scale.; Sources:

=== Early offseason rankings ===
Most early rankings for the 2026–27 season had the Spartans as a top-10 team. These included CBS Sports (No. 6), ESPN (No. 8), Fox Sports (No. 7), On3 (No. 5), Sports Illustrated (No. 10), The Athletic (No. 8), The Sporting News (No. 3), and USA Today (No. 1).

== Preseason ==
=== Preseason awards ===
Jeremy Fears Jr. was named to the AP preseason All-America team. CBS Sports named Fears the preseason Player of the Year.

=== Preseason Big Ten polls ===
The Spartans were picked to finish in second place in the preseason conference poll. They received nine first place votes. Fears was named the Big Ten Conference's preseason player of the year and he was a unanimous selection to the preseason All-Big Ten team.

=== Preseason rankings ===
The Spartans were ranked No. 6 in both the AP and Coaches preseason polls.

=== Exhibition games ===
==== Incarnate Word ====
In a change to prior seasons, the Spartans held an exhibition game instead of its usual "Midnight Madness" event on October 2, 2026. In the game against Incarnate Word, Jesse McCulloch led the Spartans with 20 points while Fears notched a double double, scoring 10 points and dishing out 13 assists. Jordan Scott added 16 points in the easy 89–59 win.

==== UConn ====
On October 20, the Spartans played No. 4-ranked UConn in an exhibition game at Breslin Center. Fears led the Spartans with 23 points and eight assists. MSU struggled from three, making only three of 20 three-point attempts as they lost 78–70. Freshman Jesiah Jervis was the only other Spartan to score in double figures, notching 11 points while hitting two three-pointers. The Spartans took 34 free throw attempts (14 by Fears) while UConn only got to the line 20 times.

==== Marquette ====
In their final exhibition game, the Spartans played Marquette in Milwaukee. MSU struggled early, quickly falling behind to the Golden Eagles and trailing throughout the first half. The Eagles had their way with the Spartans, shooting over 57% from the field as MSU only shot 25% in the first half. Jervis led the Spartans with 19 points while Jordan Scott added 18 points. Fears also scored 18 and dished out seven assists. MSU went on an 11–0 run early in the second half to pull within five points before Marquette pulled away for the easy 86–79 win.

== Regular season ==
=== Quinnipiac ===
The Spartans opened the season against Quinnipiac on November 2 in East Lansing. MSU led from the outset, easily routing the Bobcats 96–59. Jeremy Fears led all scorers with 13 points and added 11 assists. Six Spartans scored in double figures while Anton Bonke notched 13 rebounds. The Spartans shot 58% from the field in the easy win and moved to 1–0 on the season.

=== Toledo ===
The Spartans next played Toledo on November 5 in Breslin. The Rockets scored the first basket of the night, but MSU controlled the game from there, leading 48–25 at the half. Jasiah Jervis led all scores with 16 points while Jeremy Fears and Jordan Scott each scored 12. Scott added a game-high nine rebounds while Fears dished out nine assists. MSU limited Toledo to 33% from the field while the Spartans shot 51%. The win moved the Spartans to 2–0 on the season.

=== Duke ===
The Spartans, now ranked No. 5 in the country, travelled to Chicago to face No. 2-ranked Duke on November 10 in the Champions Classic. MSU led from the start and dominated the Blue Devils in the first half, limiting them to 25 points. Trailing by nine at half time, Duke never pulled within more than six for the remainder of the game as the Spartans held on for a 79–73 win. Jeremy Fears led all scorers with 18 points and 11 assists. Cam Ward scored 14 while Jasiah Jervis added 10 as the Spartans earned the upset. Jordan Scott only scored five points, but had nine rebounds and six blocks as MSU held Duke's offense in check. MSU outshot the Blue Devils 45% to 33% in the win. The Spartans moved to 3–0 on the season with the win.

=== Northern Iowa ===
The Spartans returned to East Lansing to play Northern Iowa on November 13 and dominated the Panthers. MSU set a school record by making 18 three-pointers in a game. Jeremy Fears led all scorers with 24 points and nine assists while Jasiah Jervis continued his strong play, notching 20 points on five of six shooting from three. MSU led by 15 at the break and outscored UNI by 19 in the second half in the dominant 106–72 win. The win moved MSU to 4–0 on the season.

=== Tennessee ===
The Spartans, now ranked No. 2 in the AP poll and No. 3 in the coaches poll, next faced No. 14 Tennessee in Knoxville on November 17. MSU started well, leading for the majority of the first half before the Volunteers took a two-point lead at the half. Tennessee dominated from there, outscoring the Spartans by 13 in the second half and limiting MSU to only nine field goals and 46 points in the game. The Spartans shot 18% from the field and 21% from three in the 61–46 loss. Jeremy Fears failed to make a field goal and scored all of his game-high 16 points from the free throw line. Jesiah Jervis missed all 10 shots he took and scored only one point. Cam Ward scored 12 for the Spartans, but no other player scored more than six in the drubbing. The loss dropped MSU to 4–1 on the season.

Oakland

The Spartans will return home to face Detroit Mercy on November 21.

== Roster ==
2025–26 Michigan State Spartans men's basketball team
Players
Coaches

Pos.	#	Name	Height	Weight	Year	Previous school	Hometown
F	0	Julius Avent	6 ft 7 in (2.01 m)	226 lb (103 kg)	Fr	Bergen Catholic High School	Oradell, NJ
C	34	Anton Bonke	7 ft 2 in (2.18 m)	266 lb (121 kg)	Jr	Charlotte; Providence	Port Vila, Vanuatu
F	55	Coen Carr	6 ft 6 in (1.98 m)	230 lb (104 kg)	Sr	Legacy Early College	Greenville, SC
G	1	Jeremy Fears Jr.	6 ft 2 in (1.88 m)	190 lb (86 kg)	RS Jr	Joliet West High School	Joliet, IL
F	8	Kaleb Glenn	6 ft 7 in (2.01 m)	215 lb (98 kg)	RS Jr	Florida Atlantic; Louisville; La Lumiere School	La Porte, IN
G	25	Jasiah Jervis	6 ft 4 in (1.93 m)	200 lb (91 kg)	Fr	Archbishop Stepinac High School	White Plains, NY
F	35	Jesse McCulloch	6 ft 11 in (2.11 m)	245 lb (111 kg)	RS So	Lutheran High School East	Cleveland, OH
G	7	Carlos Medlock Jr.	5 ft 11 in (1.8 m)	178 lb (81 kg)	Fr	Link Academy	Branson, MO
G	6	Jordan Scott	6 ft 8 in (2.03 m)	200 lb (91 kg)	So	South Lakes High School	Reston, VA
C	10	Ethan Taylor	7 ft 2 in (2.18 m)	252 lb (114 kg)	Fr	Link Academy	Branson, MO
G	2	Kur Teng	6 ft 5 in (1.96 m)	200 lb (91 kg)	Jr	Bradford Christian Academy	Manchester, NH
F	40	Brennan Walton (W)	6 ft 8 in (2.03 m)	230 lb (104 kg)	Jr	Okemos High School	Okemos, MI
F	43	Colin Walton (W)	6 ft 8 in (2.03 m)	230 lb (104 kg)	Jr	Okemos High School	Okemos, MI
F	3	Cam Ward	6 ft 9 in (2.06 m)	230 lb (104 kg)	So	Largo High School	Upper Marlboro, MD
G	20	Matthew Watkins (W)	6 ft 4 in (1.93 m)	203 lb (92 kg)	Sr	Perrysburg High School	Perrysburg, OH

Head coach

- Tom Izzo (Northern Michigan)

Assistant coach(es)

- Doug Wojcik (Navy)
- Thomas Kelley (Michigan State)
- Saddi Washington (Western Michigan)
- Jon Borovich (Central Michigan)
- Austin Thornton (Michigan State)

Legend

- (C) Team captain
- (S) Suspended
- (I) Ineligible
- (W) Walk-on
- Injured
- Current redshirt

Roster

== Schedule and results ==
It was announced that the Spartans would play Gonzaga in a game on December 19, 2026 at Acrisure Arena in Palm Desert, California. Izzo and Arkansas head coach John Calipari both stated their teams would play each other on Thanksgiving at Little Caesars Arena in Detroit. On April 29, 2026, it was reported that the Spartans will play Tennessee in Knoxville. The Spartans will also participate in the Champions Classic, scheduled to run at least through 2028. They will play Duke per the event's scheduling rotation. On May 12, the Big Ten Conference announced the Spartans' conference opponents. On September 17, it was announced that the team would play Incarnate Word on October 2 in an exhibition game as part of its annual Izzone campout event. The school announced the full schedule on September 23.

Date time, TV	Rank^{#}	Opponent^{#}	Result	Record	High points	High rebounds	High assists	Site (attendance) city, state
Exhibition
October 2, 2026*; 7:00 p.m., B1G+		Incarnate Word	W 89–59		20 – McCulloch	9 – Taylor	13 – Fears Jr.	Breslin Center (14,797); East Lansing, MI
October 20, 2026*; 7:00 p.m., B1G+	No. 6	No. 4 UConn	L 70–78		23 – Fears Jr.	6 – Tied	8 – Fears Jr.	Breslin Center (14,797); East Lansing, MI
October 25, 2026*; 1:00 p.m., YouTube	No. 6	at Marquette	L 79–86		19 – Jervis	4 – Ward	7 – Fears Jr.	Fiserv Forum (13,020); Milwaukee, WI
Regular season
November 2, 2026*; 7:00 p.m., B1G+	No. 6	Quinnipiac	W 96–59	1–0	13 – Fears Jr.	13 – Bonke	11 – Fears Jr.	Breslin Center (14,797); East Lansing, MI
November 5, 2026*; 8:00 p.m., Peacock / NBCSN	No. 6	Toledo	W 91–61	2–0	16 – Jervis	6 – Scott	9 – Fears Jr.	Breslin Center (14,797); East Lansing, MI
November 10, 2026*; 7:00 p.m., ESPN	No. 5	vs. No. 2 Duke; Champions Classic	W 79–73	3–0	18 – Fears Jr.	9 – Scott	11 – Fears Jr.	United Center; Chicago, IL
November 13, 2026*; 7:00 p.m., FS1	No. 5	Northern Iowa	W 106–72	4–0	24 – Fears Jr.	7 – Ward	9 – Fears Jr.	Breslin Center (14,797); East Lansing, MI
November 17, 2026*; 9:00 p.m., ESPN2	No. 2	at No. 14 Tennessee	L 46–61	4–1	16 – Fears Jr.	8 – Glenn	2 – Fears Jr.	Thompson–Boling Arena (21,678); Knoxville, TN
November 21, 2026*; 12:00 p.m., BTN	No. 2	Detroit Mercy	W 91–70	5–1	24 – Teng	12 – Ward	14 – Fears Jr.	Breslin Center (14,797); East Lansing, MI
November 26, 2026*; 4:30 p.m., CBS		vs. Arkansas; CareSource Invitational						Little Caesars Arena; Detroit, MI
December 2, 2026; 6:30 p.m., BTN		Minnesota						Breslin Center; East Lansing, MI
December 5, 2026*; 2:30 p.m., FS1		Drake						Breslin Center; East Lansing, MI
December 9, 2026; 8:30 p.m., BTN		at Maryland						Xfinity Center; College Park, MD
December 12, 2026*; 2:00 p.m., BTN		Merrimack						Breslin Center; East Lansing, MI
December 19, 2026*; 5:00 p.m., CBS		vs. Gonzaga; Acrisure Series						Acrisure Arena; Palm Desert, CA
December 22, 2026*; 6:00 p.m., BTN		Oakland						Breslin Center; East Lansing, MI
December 29, 2026*; 8:00 p.m., FS1		Penn						Breslin Center; East Lansing, MI
January 2, 2027; 3:45 p.m., CBS		at Nebraska						Pinnacle Bank Arena; Lincoln, NE
January 5, 2027; 6:30 p.m., FS1		Washington						Breslin Center; East Lansing, MI
January 9, 2027; 8:00 p.m., FOX		at UCLA						Pauley Pavilion; Los Angeles, CA
January 12, 2027; 10:00 p.m., Peacock / NBCSN		at USC						Galen Center; Los Angeles, CA
January 16, 2027; 4:00 p.m., FS1		Oregon						Breslin Center; East Lansing, MI
January 23, 2027; 1:00 p.m., CBS		at Ohio State						Value City Arena; Columbus, OH
January 26, 2027; 7:00 p.m., BTN		Penn State						Breslin Center; East Lansing, MI
January 30, 2027; 3:00/8:00 p.m., FOX		Purdue						Breslin Center; East Lansing, MI
February 2, 2027; 7:00 p.m., Peacock / NBCSN		Maryland						Breslin Center; East Lansing, MI
February 5, 2027; 8:00 p.m., FOX		at Illinois						State Farm Center; Champaign, IL
February 10, 2027; 6:30 p.m., BTN		Rutgers						Breslin Center; East Lansing, MI
February 13, 2027; 1:00 p.m., CBS		at Michigan; Rivalry						Crisler Center; Ann Arbor, MI
February 16, 2027; 9:00 p.m., Peacock / NBCSN		at Iowa						Carver–Hawkeye Arena; Iowa City, IA
February 20, 2027; 8:00 p.m., FOX		Nebraska						Breslin Center; East Lansing, MI
February 23, 2027; 7:00 p.m., Peacock / NBCSN		at Indiana						Simon Skjodt Assembly Hall; Bloomington, IN
February 26, 2027; 8:00 p.m., FOX		Michigan; Rivalry						Breslin Center; East Lansing, MI
March 2, 2027; 8:30 p.m., FS1		at Northwestern						Welsh–Ryan Arena; Evanston, IL
March 6, 2027; 3:45 p.m., CBS		Wisconsin						Breslin Center; East Lansing, MI
Big Ten tournament
March 2027; TBD		vs.						Gainbridge Fieldhouse; Indianapolis, IN
*Non-conference game. ^{#}Rankings from AP poll. (#) Tournament seedings in parentheses. All times are in Eastern Time.

== Player statistics ==
Individual player statistics (through November 20, 2026)
			Minutes		Scoring		Total FGs			3-point FGs			Free-Throws			Rebounds							
Player	GP	GS	Tot	Avg	Pts	Avg	FG	FGA	Pct	3FG	3FA	Pct	FT	FTA	Pct	Off	Def	Tot	Avg	A	Stl	Blk	TO
Avent, Julius	3	0	16	5.3	5	1.7	2	4	.500	1	2	.500	0	0		0	3	3	1.0	0	0	1	0
Bonke, Anton	5	4	59	11.8	24	4.8	10	15	.667	0	1	.000	4	8	.500	8	14	22	4.4	0	0	4	7
Carr, Coen	5	5	109	21.8	45	9.0	14	30	.467	4	7	.571	13	17	.765	6	16	22	4.4	2	5	5	5
Fears Jr., Jeremy	5	5	144	28.8	83	16.6	17	34	.500	5	13	.375	44	54	.815	2	9	11	2.2	42	6	1	13
Glenn, Caleb	5	0	69	13.8	32	6.4	8	24	.333	1	8	.125	15	20	.750	13	9	22	4.4	0	3	1	5
Jervis, Jesiah	5	5	128	25.6	51	10.2	17	41	.415	12	28	.429	5	8	.625	3	16	19	3.8	6	3	3	7
McCulloch, Jesse	4	1	69	17.3	20	5.0	7	14	.500	3	7	.429	3	4	.750	5	10	15	3.8	3	4	1	3
Medlock Jr., Carlos	5	0	62	12.4	31	5.0	11	24	.458	7	12	.583	2	8	.250	0	3	3	0.6	11	1	0	1
Scott, Jordan	5	5	117	23.4	45	9.0	17	40	.425	9	23	.391	2	4	.500	6	24	30	6.0	24	30	12	8
Taylor, Ethan	5	0	57	11.4	18	3.6	4	8	.500	0	0		10	14	.714	5	13	18	3.6	1	1	3	5
Teng, Kur	5	0	64	12.8	22	4.4	7	24	.292	6	19	.316	2	2	1.000	3	4	7	1.4	5	2	0	2
Walton, Brennan	3	0	6	2.0	0	0.0	0	1	.000	0	1	.000	0	0		0	1	1	0.3	0	0	0	0
Walton, Colin	3	0	4	1.3	2	0.7	0	1	.000	0	1	.000	2	2	1.000	1	0	1	0.3	0	0	0	0
Ward, Cam	5	0	91	18.2	38	7.6	12	20	.600	0	0		14	24	.583	10	14	24	4.8	2	4	4	4
Watkins, Matthew	3	0	4	1.3	2	0.7	1	3	.333	0	1	.000	0	0		0	1	1	0.3	2	1	0	0
Total	5		1000		418	83.6	127	283	.449	48	123	.390	116	165	.703	70	146	216	43.2	86	38	31	60
Opponents	5		1000		326	65.2	107	282	.379	31	111	.279	81	30	.623	58	102	160	32.0	70	30	16	69

Legend
GP	Games played	GS	Games started	Avg	Average per game
FG	Field-goals made	FGA	Field-goal attempts	Off	Offensive rebounds
Def	Defensive rebounds	A	Assists	TO	Turnovers
Blk	Blocks	Stl	Steals

ource

== Rankings ==
Ranking movements Legend: ██ Increase in ranking ██ Decrease in ranking ( ) = First-place votes
	Week																				
Poll	Pre	1	2	3	4	5	6	7	8	9	10	11	12	13	14	15	16	17	18	19	Final
AP	6	5	2 (3)																		
Coaches	6	5	3 (2)																		
