= Lincoln Cosby =

American basketball player (born 2008)

No. 5 – Michigan Wolverines
- Position: Small forward / power forward
- Conference: Big Ten Conference

Personal information
- Born: November 29, 2008 (age 17)
- Listed height: 6 ft 10 in (2.08 m)
- Listed weight: 215 lb (98 kg)

Career information
- High school: Montverde Academy (Montverde, Florida)
- College: Michigan

Lincoln Cosby (born November 29, 2008) is an American college basketball player for the Michigan Wolverines of the Big Ten Conference. He was a five-star, top-10 ranked member of the 2027 recruiting class, before reclassifying to 2026 as a four-star, top-50 ranked member.

== Early life and high school ==
Cosby's earliest basketball experiences came when his family lived in Nashville, Tennessee. His family moved to the Lakota School District in suburban Cincinnati, Ohio when he was in 7th grade. In 2023, Cosby had then moved to Atlanta, Georgia and became the first freshman and youngest player to ever sign with Overtime Elite. He began his freshman year regarded by many as the top player in the class of 2027. Cosby was ESPN's No. 2 prospect as of May 2024. In July 2024, ESPN rated him as the No. 3 prospect. That summer, he had multiple head to head matchups against Baba Oladotun as the two vied for the top spot in the 2027 rankings. He continued as a sophomore on the Overtime Elite circuit where he stood out, even as one of the youngest players. He averaged 15.6 points, 11.6 rebounds, 1.7 steals, and 1.7 blocks as a sophomore. Before transferring to Montverde Academy in Florida for his junior year, he was ranked as the No. 5 prospect in July 2025.

=== Recruitment ===
Cosby had offers that included, Cincinnati, Ohio State, Michigan, Auburn, Texas A&M, Oregon, Florida State, Houston, Memphis, Ole Miss, Georgia, Louisville, Missouri, Wake Forest, UNLV, Arizona State, Alabama, USC, and LSU. His October 2025 visit to Michigan was his only known official visit, according to Sports Illustrated. However, in October 2025, Yahoo! Sports had announced a scheduled October visit to Kentucky. Though rivals also listed only one visit to Michigan. On January 31, 2026, he announced that he would reclassify to the 2026 recruiting class. He had been a top-10 member in the class of 2027, ranked No. 10 by ESPN and No. 9 by rivals before the switch to 2026. On February 10, 2026, Cosby committed to college play basketball at the University of Michigan. He had recently undergone surgery on his ACL before his announcement. Once reclassified, he was ranked as a top 50 prospect by all three recruiting outlets. He joined a top-ranked Michigan recruiting class that included Brandon McCoy Jr., Quinn Costello, Joseph Hartman, Malachi Brown and Marcus Moller.

=== International play ===
He was selected by USA Basketball for the 2023 and 2025 Men’s Junior National Team minicamps. He also participated in the 2023-24 NextGen EuroLeague Berlin Finals for the Under-18 Overtime Elite team, averaging 3.3 points and 3 rebounds in 3 games.

== College career ==
In April 2026, Cosby signed to play college basketball at the University of Michigan for head coach Dusty May and the Wolverines. After suffering a torn ACL during his junior year of high school basketball, he reclassified to join the Wolverines a year early, where he will spend most of the season rehabbing his injury. After Dusty May departed to coach the Dallas Mavericks in June 2026, Mike Boynton was promoted to head coach at Michigan and Cosby remained with the program.
