= 2026–27 Oregon Ducks men's basketball team =

American college basketball season

2026–27 Oregon Ducks men's basketball
- Conference: Big Ten Conference
- Record: 3–1 (0–0 Big Ten)
- Head coach: Tony Stubblefield (interim)
- Assistant coaches: Brian Fish; Tom Hankins; Yasir Rosemond; Josh Jamieson
- Home arena: Matthew Knight Arena

2026–27 Big Ten Conference men's basketball standings
| | Conf. | | | | Overall |
| Team | W | | L | PCT | W | | L | PCT |
|---|---|---|---|---|---|---|---|---|
| Indiana | 0 | – | 0 | – | 6 | – | 0 | 1.000 |
| Minnesota | 0 | – | 0 | – | 6 | – | 0 | 1.000 |
| No. 24 Nebraska | 0 | – | 0 | – | 5 | – | 0 | 1.000 |
| No. 7 UCLA | 0 | – | 0 | – | 5 | – | 0 | 1.000 |
| No. 18т USC | 0 | – | 0 | – | 5 | – | 0 | 1.000 |
| Washington | 0 | – | 0 | – | 4 | – | 0 | 1.000 |
| No. 10 Illinois | 0 | – | 0 | – | 5 | – | 1 | .833 |
| Penn State | 0 | – | 0 | – | 5 | – | 1 | .833 |
| No. 2 Michigan State | 0 | – | 0 | – | 4 | – | 1 | .800 |
| No. 18т Michigan | 0 | – | 0 | – | 3 | – | 1 | .750 |
| Oregon | 0 | – | 0 | – | 3 | – | 1 | .750 |
| Ohio State | 0 | – | 0 | – | 4 | – | 2 | .667 |
| Purdue | 0 | – | 0 | – | 4 | – | 2 | .667 |
| Rutgers | 0 | – | 0 | – | 4 | – | 2 | .667 |
| Wisconsin | 0 | – | 0 | – | 4 | – | 2 | .667 |
| Iowa | 0 | – | 0 | – | 3 | – | 2 | .600 |
| Maryland | 0 | – | 0 | – | 3 | – | 2 | .600 |
| Northwestern | 0 | – | 0 | – | 3 | – | 3 | .500 |
† 2027 Big Ten tournament winner As of November 21, 2026; Rankings from AP poll

The 2026–27 Oregon Ducks men's basketball team represents the University of Oregon during the 2026–27 NCAA Division I men's basketball season. The Ducks are led by interim head coach Tony Stubblefield after former head coach Dana Altman retired before the season on October 7, 2026. They play their home games at Matthew Knight Arena as third-year members of the Big Ten Conference.

== Previous season ==
Despite high preseason expectations, the Ducks finished the 2025–26 season 12–20, 5–15 in Big Ten play to finish tied for 15th place. They lost to Maryland in the first round of the Big Ten tournament.

== Offseason ==
=== Dana Altman retirement ===
On October 7, 2026, longtime head coach Dana Altman announced his surprise retirement after 16 seasons. Altman posted a 382–182 record with the Ducks, including four Pac-12 tournament titles, four Pac-12 regular season titles and nine NCAA tournament appearances. Altman was named Pac-12 Coach of the Year three times in 2013, 2015 and 2016.

Former DePaul head coach and longtime assistant Tony Stubblefield was named the interim following Altman's retirement.

=== Departures ===
Oregon Departures
| Name | Number | Pos. | Height | Weight | Year | Hometown | Reason for Departure |
|---|---|---|---|---|---|---|---|
| Efe Vatan | 0 | F | 6'10" | 230 | (redshirt) Freshman | Istanbul, Turkey | Transferred to Stony Brook |
| Jackson Shelstad | 3 | G | 6'1" | 185 | Junior | West Linn, Oregon | Transferred to Louisville |
| Dezdrick Lindsay | 4 | F | 6'6" | 200 | Senior | Louisville, Kentucky | Transferred to Kansas State |
| Takai Simpkins | 5 | G | 6'5" | 190 | Senior | Brooklyn, New York | Transferred to Lipscomb |
| Oleksandr Kobzystyi | 6 | F | 6'7" | 225 | Senior | Kremenchuk, Ukraine | Graduated |
| Kwame Evans Jr. | 10 | F | 6'9" | 200 | Junior | Baltimore, Maryland | Transferred to Villanova |
| Drew Carter | 12 | G | 6'3" | 190 | Senior | Portland, Oregon | Graduated |
| JJ Frakes | 14 | G | 6'5" | 185 | Freshman | Berrien Springs, Michigan | Transferred to Buffalo |
| Ege Demir | 16 | C | 6'11" | 275 | Junior | Kaduna, Nigeria | Transferred to Duquesne |
| Devon Pryor | 22 | F | 6'7" | 185 | Junior | Houston, Texas | Transferred to UT Rio Grande Valley |
| Jamari Phillips | 24 | G | 6'4" | 190 | Sophomore | Modesto, California | Transferred to Washington State |
| Nate Bittle | 32 | C | 7'0" | 215 | Senior | Central Point, Oregon | Graduated |
| Miles Stewart | 35 | F | 6'5" | 215 | (redshirt) Senior | Windermere, Florida | Graduated |

=== Incoming transfers ===
Oregon Incoming Transfers
| Name | Number | Pos. | Height | Weight | Year | Hometown | Previous school |
|---|---|---|---|---|---|---|---|
| Jerry Easter II | 1 | G | 6'5" | 210 | Sophomore | Toledo, Ohio | USC |
| Jasper Johnson | 2 | G | 6'5" | 195 | Sophomore | Lexington, Kentucky | Kentucky |
| Dwayne Aristode | 3 | F | 6'8" | 235 | Sophomore | Lelystad, Netherlands | Arizona |
| Fred Payne | 4 | G | 6'2" | 190 | Senior | Grambling, Louisiana | Boston College |
| Tyrone Riley IV | 5 | G | 6'6" | 205 | Junior | Downey, California | San Francisco |
| Taylor Bol Bowen | 7 | F | 6'10" | 210 | Senior | Jericho, Vermont | Alabama |
| Andrew Meadow | 8 | F | 6'7" | 225 | Senior | Santa Clarita, California | Boise State |
| Pharaoh Compton | 9 | F | 6'7" | 240 | Junior | Chicago, Illinois | San Diego State |

=== 2026 recruiting class ===
College recruiting
| Name | Hometown | School | Height | Weight | Commit date |
|---|---|---|---|---|---|
| Tajh Ariza; SF | Playa Del Rey, CA | Link Academy (MO) | 6 ft 9 in (2.06 m) | 200 lb (91 kg) | Oct 3, 2025 |
| Tajh Ariza; SF | Recruit ratings: Rivals: 247Sports: ESPN: (88) | | | | |
| Kendre Harrison; C | Reidsville, NC | Reidsville High School | 6 ft 6 in (1.98 m) | 250 lb (110 kg) | Nov 30, 2024 |
| Kendre Harrison; C | Recruit ratings: Rivals: 247Sports: ESPN: (83) | | | | |
| Seven Spurlock; SF | Frisco, TX | Reidsville High School | 6 ft 4 in (1.93 m) | 210 lb (95 kg) | Mar 9, 2026 |
| Seven Spurlock; SF | Recruit ratings: Rivals: 247Sports: ESPN: (82) | | | | |
Overall recruit ranking: Rivals: 21 247Sports: 24 ESPN: NR
Note: In many cases, Scout, Rivals, 247Sports, On3, and ESPN may conflict in their listings of height and weight.; In these cases, the average was taken. ESPN grades are on a 100-point scale.; Sources:

== Roster ==
2025–26 Oregon Ducks men's basketball team
Players
Coaches

| Pos. | # | Name | Height | Weight | Year | Previous school | Hometown |
|---|---|---|---|---|---|---|---|
| F | 0 | Tajh Ariza | 6 ft 10 in (2.08 m) | 210 lb (95 kg) | Fr | Link Academy (MO) | Playa Del Rey, California |
| G | 1 | Jerry Easter II | 6 ft 5 in (1.96 m) | 193 lb (88 kg) | So | USC | Toledo, Ohio |
| G | 2 | Jasper Johnson | 6 ft 5 in (1.96 m) | 180 lb (82 kg) | So | Kentucky | Lexington, Kentucky |
| F | 3 | Dwayne Aristode | 6 ft 7 in (2.01 m) | 210 lb (95 kg) | So | Arizona | Lelystad, Netherlands |
| G | 4 | Fred Payne | 6 ft 2 in (1.88 m) | 185 lb (84 kg) | RS Jr | Boston College | Grambling, Louisiana |
| G | 5 | Tyrone Riley IV | 6 ft 6 in (1.98 m) | 200 lb (91 kg) | Jr | San Francisco | Downey, California |
| F | 7 | Taylor Bol Bowen | 6 ft 10 in (2.08 m) | 202 lb (92 kg) | Sr | Alabama | Jericho, Vermont |
| F | 8 | Andrew Meadow | 6 ft 7 in (2.01 m) | 218 lb (99 kg) | Sr | Boise State | Santa Clarita, California |
| F | 9 | Pharaoh Compton | 6 ft 7 in (2.01 m) | 230 lb (104 kg) | Jr | San Diego State | Chicago, Illinois |
| F | 11 | Seven Spurlock | 6 ft 5 in (1.96 m) | 220 lb (100 kg) | Fr | Reidsville High School | Frisco, Texas |
| F | 13 | Sean Stewart | 6 ft 9 in (2.06 m) | 225 lb (102 kg) | Sr | Ohio State | Windermere, Florida |
| G | 15 | Rian Gonzales | 6 ft 3 in (1.91 m) | 180 lb (82 kg) | So | Volcano Vista High School | Albuquerque, New Mexico |
| G | 17 | Luke Johnson | 6 ft 8 in (2.03 m) | 225 lb (102 kg) | Jr | Huntington High School | Portland, Oregon |
| G | 23 | Wei Lin | 6 ft 4 in (1.93 m) | 190 lb (86 kg) | Jr | Nanjing Monkey Kings | Xiamen, China |

Head coach

- Tony Stubblefield (Omaha)

Assistant coach(es)

- Brian Fish (Marshall)
- Tom Hankins (Northwestern State)
- Yasir Rosemond (Oregon)
- Josh Jamieson (Oregon)

Legend

- (C) Team captain
- (S) Suspended
- (I) Ineligible
- (W) Walk-on
- Injured
- Current redshirt

Roster

== Schedule and results ==
| Date time, TV | Rank^{#} | Opponent^{#} | Result | Record | High points | High rebounds | High assists | Site (attendance) city, state |
Exhibition
| October 15, 2026*; 7:00 p.m., B1G+ | | Seattle | L 65–71 | – | 15 – Compton | 7 – Bol Bowen | 3 – Tied | Matthew Knight Arena (4,208); Eugene, OR |
| October 21, 2026*; 5:30 p.m., ESPN+ | | at Utah | L 77–81 | – | 16 – Riley IV | 7 – Bol Bowen | 4 – J. Johnson | Jon M. Huntsman Center; Salt Lake City, UT |
| October 25, 2026*; 1:30 p.m., B1G+ | | Stanford | W 85–57 | – | 15 – Payne | 6 – Bol Bowen | 4 – Bol Bowen | Matthew Knight Arena (4,246); Eugene, OR |
Regular season
| November 2, 2026*; 7:00 p.m., BTN | | Montana | W 87–69 | 1–0 | 17 – Riley IV | 13 – Ewin | 5 – Payne | Matthew Knight Arena (4,067); Eugene, OR |
| November 6, 2026*; 3:00 p.m., B1G+ | | Eastern Washington | W 98–71 | 2–0 | 20 – Lin | 9 – Stewart | 7 – Ewin | Matthew Knight Arena (4,047); Eugene, OR |
| November 11, 2026*; 7:00 p.m., B1G+ | | Mississippi Valley State | W 100–66 | 3–0 | 17 – J. Johnson | 13 – Ewin | 8 – Lin | Matthew Knight Arena (4,307); Eugene, OR |
| November 15, 2026*; 2:00 p.m., B1G+ | | Pepperdine | Postponed due to FAA nationwide ground stop, makeup TBD | | | | | Matthew Knight Arena; Eugene, OR |
| November 19, 2026*; 6:00 p.m., BTN | | vs. Oregon State; Rivalry | L 71–82 | 3–1 | 18 – J. Johnson | 14 – Ewin | 7 – Ewin | Moda Center (5,607); Portland, OR |
| November 24, 2026*; 7:30 p.m., ESPN | | vs. St. John's; Players Era Festival Players Era 16 – Bracket 1 First round | | | | | | Michelob Ultra Arena; Las Vegas, NV |
| November 26, 2026*; ESPN Networks | | vs. Louisville / Texas Tech; Players Era Festival Players Era 16 – Bracket 1 | | | | | | Michelob Ultra Arena; Las Vegas, NV |
| November 27, 2026*; ESPN Networks | | vs. Tennessee / Maryland / San Diego State / Iowa State; Players Era Festival Players Era 16 – Bracket 1 | | | | | | Michelob Ultra Arena; Las Vegas, NV |
| December 1, 2026; 7:00 p.m., FS1 | | at UCLA | | | | | | Pauley Pavilion; Los Angeles, CA |
| December 5, 2026; 1:00 p.m., BTN | | USC | | | | | | Matthew Knight Arena; Eugene, OR |
| December 12, 2026*; 1:00 p.m., BTN | | Indiana State | | | | | | Matthew Knight Arena; Eugene, OR |
| December 16, 2026*; 7:30 p.m., B1G+ | | Southern | | | | | | Matthew Knight Arena; Eugene, OR |
| December 20, 2026*; 1:30 p.m., Peacock / NBCSN | | Portland State | | | | | | Matthew Knight Arena; Eugene, OR |
| December 30, 2026; 1:00 p.m., BTN | | at Ohio State | | | | | | Value City Arena; Columbus, OH |
| January 2, 2027; 11:00 a.m., BTN | | at Penn State | | | | | | Bryce Jordan Center; Unniversity Park, PA |
| January 6, 2027; 7:30 p.m., BTN | | Indiana | | | | | | Matthew Knight Arena; Eugene, OR |
| January 10, 2027; 3:30 p.m., BTN | | Nebraska | | | | | | Matthew Knight Arena; Eugene, OR |
| January 16, 2027; 1:00 p.m., FS1 | | at Michigan State | | | | | | Breslin Center; East Lansing, MI |
| January 19, 2027; 4:00 p.m., Peacock / NBCSN | | at Michigan | | | | | | Crisler Center; Ann Arbor, MI |
| January 23, 2027; 4:00 p.m., Peacock / NBCSN | | Northwestern | | | | | | Matthew Knight Arena; Eugene, OR |
| January 27, 2027; 8:00 p.m., BTN | | Rutgers | | | | | | Matthew Knight Arena; Eugene, OR |
| January 30, 2027*; 11:00 a.m., CBS | | vs. Gonzaga; Battle in Seattle | | | | | | Climate Pledge Arena; Seattle, WA |
| February 5, 2027; 5:30 p.m., BTN | | at Wisconsin | | | | | | Kohl Center; Madison, WI |
| February 7, 2027; 1:30 p.m., FS1 | | Washington | | | | | | Matthew Knight Arena; Eugene, OR |
| February 10, 2027; 5:30 p.m., BTN | | at Iowa | | | | | | Carver–Hawkeye Arena; Iowa City, IA |
| February 13, 2027; 11:00 a.m., BTN | | at Minnesota | | | | | | Williams Arena; Minneapolis, MN |
| February 17, 2027; 6:00 p.m., BTN | | Maryland | | | | | | Matthew Knight Arena; Eugene, OR |
| February 20, 2027; 2:00 p.m., FOX | | Illinois | | | | | | Matthew Knight Arena; Eugene, OR |
| February 23, 2027; 7:30 p.m., BTN | | Purdue | | | | | | Matthew Knight Arena; Eugene, OR |
| February 27, 2027; 3:00 p.m., FS1 | | at USC | | | | | | Galen Center; Los Angeles, CA |
| March 3, 2027; 7:30 p.m., BTN | | UCLA | | | | | | Matthew Knight Arena; Eugene, OR |
| March 6, 2027; 7:00 p.m., FS1 | | at Washington | | | | | | Alaska Airlines Arena; Seattle, WA |
*Non-conference game. ^{#}Rankings from AP Poll. (#) Tournament seedings in parentheses. All times are in Pacific Time.
