= Trevor Ariza =

American basketball player (born 1985)

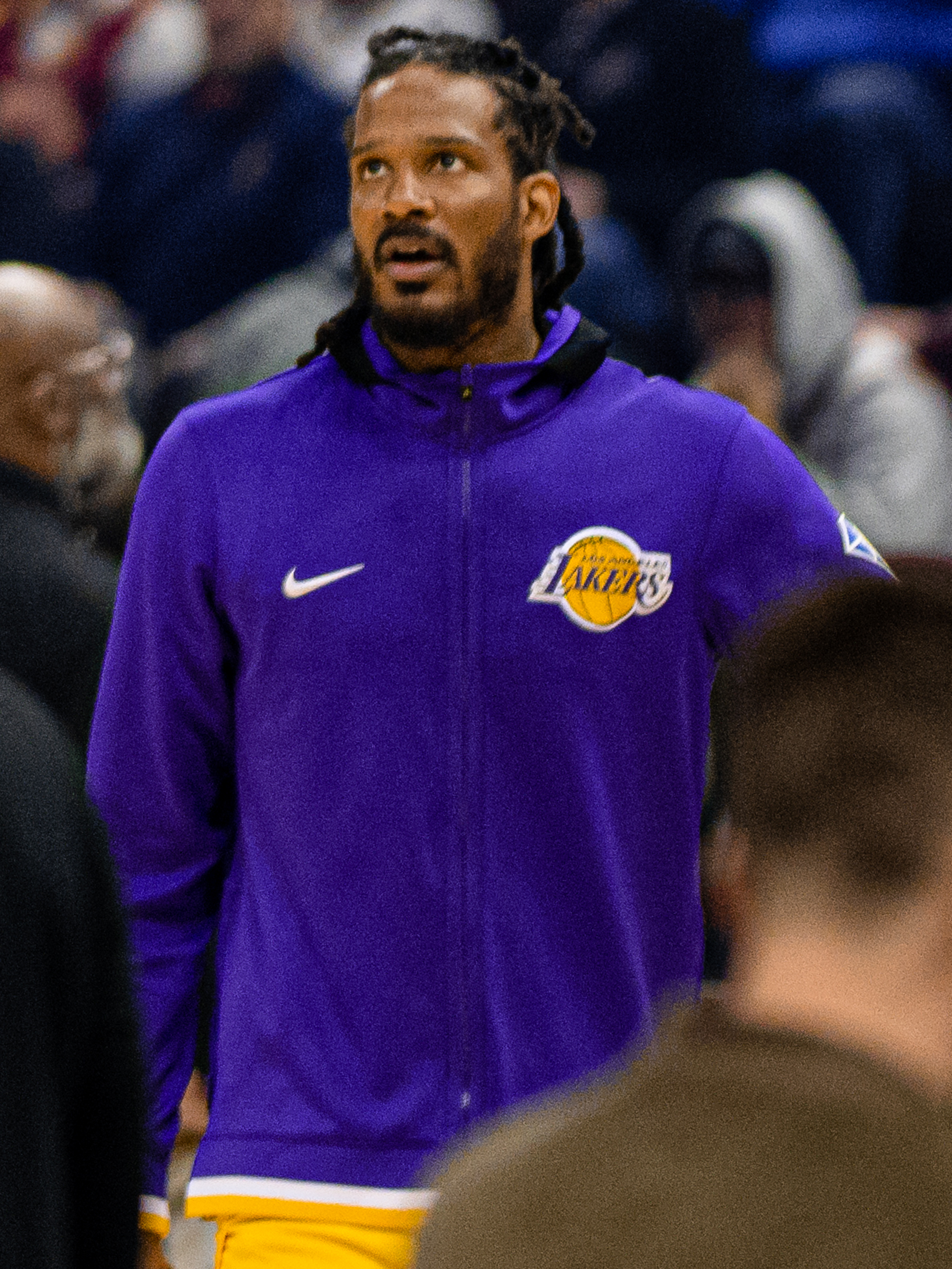
- Ariza with the Los Angeles Lakers in 2022

Personal information
- Born: June 30, 1985 (age 41) Miami, Florida, U.S.
- Listed height: 6 ft 8 in (2.03 m)
- Listed weight: 215 lb (98 kg)

Career information
- High school: Westchester (Los Angeles, California)
- College: UCLA (2003–2004)
- NBA draft: 2004: 2nd round, 43rd overall pick
- Drafted by: New York Knicks
- Playing career: 2004–2022
- Position: Small forward
- Number: 21, 1, 3, 0, 8

Career history
- 2004–2006: New York Knicks
- 2006–2007: Orlando Magic
- 2007–2009: Los Angeles Lakers
- 2009–2010: Houston Rockets
- 2010–2012: New Orleans Hornets
- 2012–2014: Washington Wizards
- 2014–2018: Houston Rockets
- 2018: Phoenix Suns
- 2018–2019: Washington Wizards
- 2019–2020: Sacramento Kings
- 2020: Portland Trail Blazers
- 2021: Miami Heat
- 2021–2022: Los Angeles Lakers

Career highlights
- NBA champion (2009); Pac-10 All-Freshman Team (2004); Second-team Parade All-American (2003); California Mr. Basketball (2003)
- Stats at NBA.com
- Stats at Basketball Reference

Trevor Anthony Ariza (born June 30, 1985) is an American former professional basketball player who spent 18 seasons in the National Basketball Association (NBA). A small forward, Ariza played college basketball for one season with the UCLA Bruins before being selected in the second round of the 2004 NBA draft by the New York Knicks. Ariza won an NBA championship with the Los Angeles Lakers in 2009. He also played for the Orlando Magic, Houston Rockets, New Orleans Hornets, Washington Wizards, Phoenix Suns, Sacramento Kings, Portland Trail Blazers, and Miami Heat.

== High school and college career ==
Ariza attended Westchester High School in Los Angeles. As a junior in 2001–02, he combined with teammates and fellow future NBA players Hassan Adams, Brandon Heath, and Bobby Brown to lead the Comets to the California State championship. Considered a five-star recruit by Rivals.com, Ariza was listed as the No. 5 power forward and the No. 18 player in the nation in 2003.

As a freshman at UCLA in 2003–04, Ariza played in 25 games (23 starts) and averaged 11.6 points, 6.5 rebounds and a team-high 1.7 steals. He subsequently earned All-Pac 10 Freshman Team honors. He declared for the NBA Draft following his freshman campaign at UCLA.

== Professional career ==
=== New York Knicks (2004–2006) ===
Ariza was selected by the New York Knicks in the second round (43rd overall) of the 2004 NBA draft. At 19 years, four months and four days old, Ariza became the youngest player to ever suit up for the Knicks. In the 2004–2005 season, his 80 games and 1,382 minutes were the most played by a Knicks rookie since Greg Anthony played 82 games in the 1991–1992 season. Ariza averaged 5.9 points, 3.0 rebounds and 1.1 assists per game in his rookie season.

=== Orlando Magic (2006–2007) ===
In February 2006, Ariza was traded along with Penny Hardaway to the Orlando Magic in exchange for Steve Francis. After the trade, he played in 21 games and averaged 4.7 points per game for the rest of the season. In the 2006–07 season he played in 57 games and started in 7. He averaged 8.9 points along with 4.4 rebounds and 1.1 assists.

=== Los Angeles Lakers (2007–2009) ===
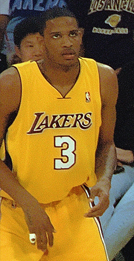
Ariza with the Lakers in 2009

In November 2007, Ariza was traded to the Los Angeles Lakers in exchange for Brian Cook and Maurice Evans. He fractured a bone in his right foot in January 2008, but made his return in Game 2 of the Western Conference Finals against the San Antonio Spurs in late May, scoring a basket within his first minute of play. The Lakers went on to defeat the Spurs in 5 games and advance to the 2008 NBA Finals, but lost to the Boston Celtics in 6 games.

In the 2008–09 season, he played in all 82 games, starting 20. Ariza was ejected during a game against Portland on March 9, 2009, following a flagrant foul on Rudy Fernández. On March 15, 2009, versus the Dallas Mavericks, Ariza scored a career-high 26 points along with 3 steals, 3 rebounds, and 2 assists. After becoming a starter, he began to show more ability on defense.

In the playoffs, Ariza scored a playoff career-high 21 points in Game 1 of the first round against Utah Jazz. In the Western Conference Finals against the Denver Nuggets, Ariza stole an inbound pass from Chauncey Billups in Game 1 to help Lakers beat the Nuggets. In Game 3, the Lakers led by two points with 37.1 seconds remaining when Ariza stole Kenyon Martin's pass to Carmelo Anthony near midcourt to help the Lakers take a 2–1 lead. The Lakers won the series 4–2, sending them to the NBA Finals against the Orlando Magic. In Game 4 of the Finals, Ariza, who was 0-for-6 in the first half, scored 13 in the third quarter to help the Lakers win in overtime and finished the game with nine rebounds and three 3-pointers. The Lakers went on to win their 15th NBA title in five games, 4–1. Ariza averaged 11.3 points and 4.2 rebounds and shot 50% from three-point range in the playoffs.

=== Houston Rockets (2009–2010) ===
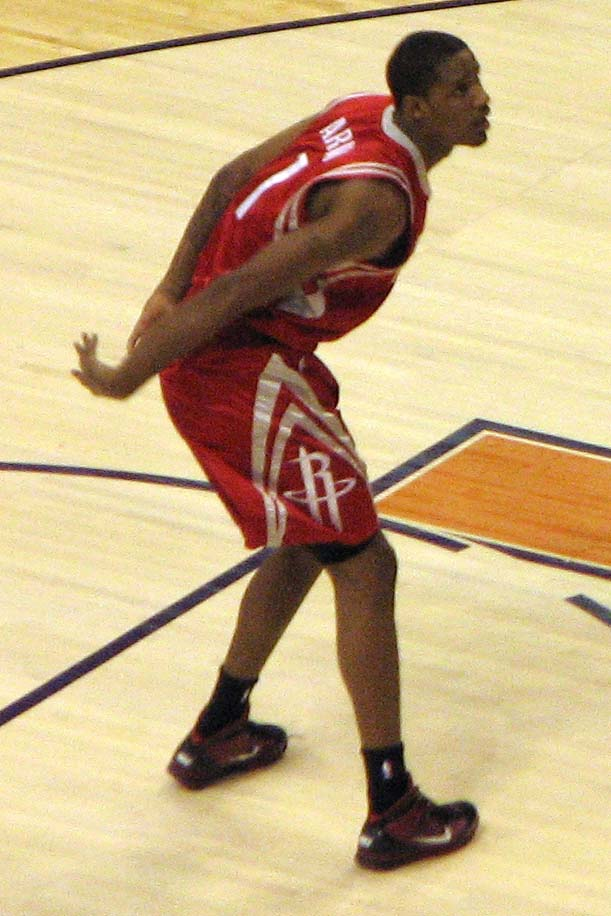
Ariza playing for the Rockets in 2010

On July 3, 2009, Ariza reached an agreement with the Houston Rockets worth $33 million over five years. Ariza was signed using the Disabled Player Exception the Rockets were granted for injured center Yao Ming. On October 31, 2009, against the Portland Trail Blazers, Ariza scored a career high 33 points in a 111–107 Rockets win. On December 13, 2009, Ariza was ejected after he attempted to punch DeMar DeRozan of the Toronto Raptors after having the ball stolen by him. He was subsequently suspended for one game. On April 14, 2010, in the Rockets' final game of the season, Ariza recorded his first career triple-double, tallying 26 points, 10 rebounds, and 10 assists.

=== New Orleans Hornets (2010–2012) ===
On August 11, 2010, Ariza was traded to the New Orleans Hornets as part of a four-team, five-player trade, with Darren Collison and James Posey going to the Indiana Pacers, Troy Murphy to the New Jersey Nets, and Courtney Lee to Houston. During the 2011 NBA playoffs, Ariza logged career highs in minutes per game (40.2), points per game (15.5) rebounds (6.5) and assists (3.3). The Hornets lost to the Los Angeles Lakers in 6 games in the first round.

=== Washington Wizards (2012–2014) ===
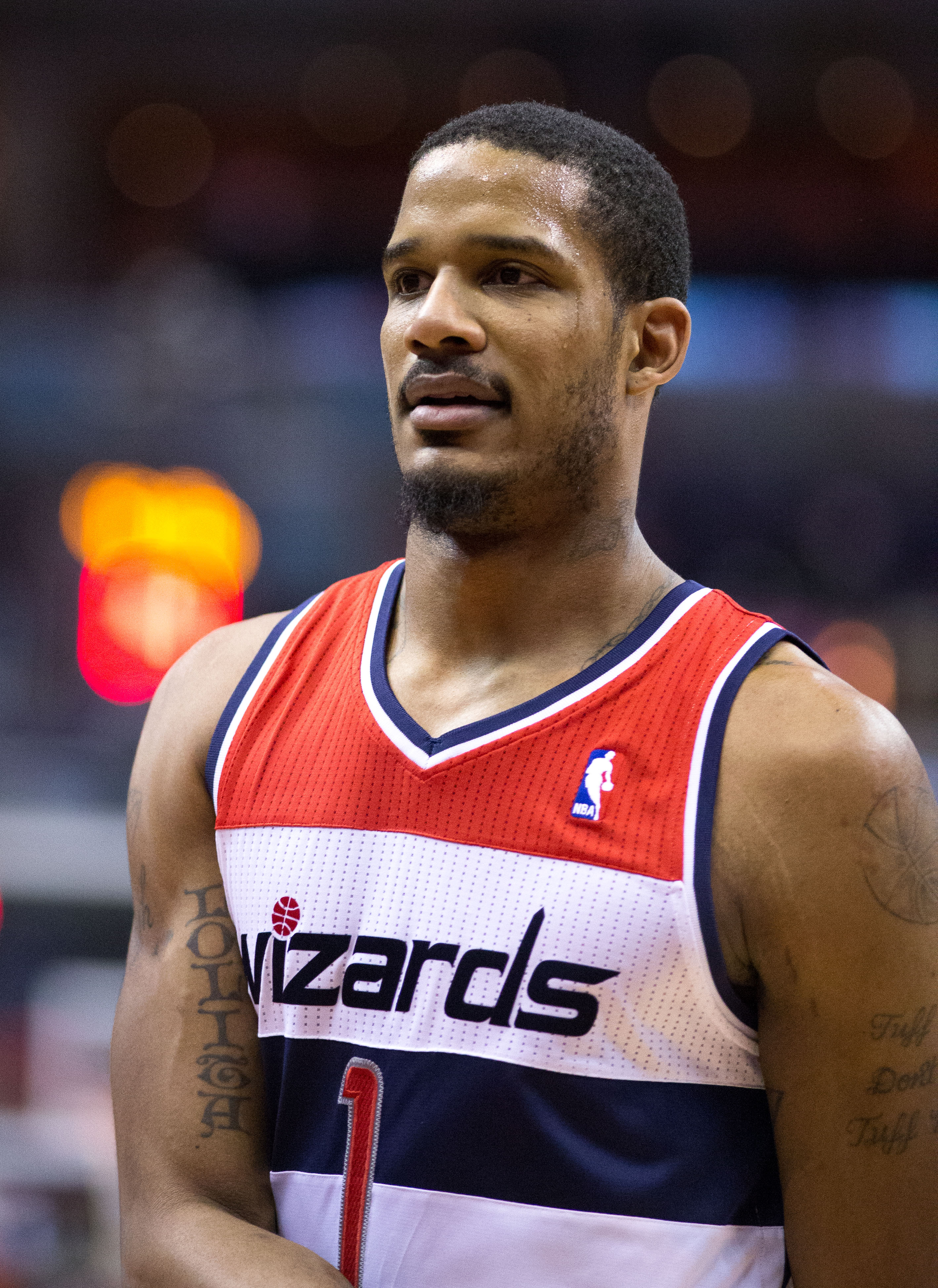
Ariza with the Wizards in 2013

On June 20, 2012, Ariza and Emeka Okafor were traded to the Washington Wizards for Rashard Lewis and a draft pick to the New Orleans Hornets.

On February 12, 2014, Ariza recorded a career-high 10 made three-pointers to score a season-high 32 points, as well as 11 rebounds, 3 assists and 3 steals, in a 113–112 loss to the Houston Rockets. The 10 three-pointers set a franchise record for most made three-pointers in a game.

On March 1, 2014, Ariza recorded a career-high 40 points, including eight 3-pointers, in a 122–103 victory over the Philadelphia 76ers.

On April 27, 2014, Ariza set a playoff career-high 30 points against the Chicago Bulls in Game 4 of their 2014 NBA Playoffs first-round match-up, which the Wizards won 98–89. The team went on to lose to the Indiana Pacers in six games in the conference semifinals.

=== Return to Houston (2014–2018) ===
On July 15, 2014, Ariza was re-acquired by the Houston Rockets in a three-team sign-and-trade deal that also involved the New Orleans Pelicans, which sent Omer Asik and Omri Casspi to the Pelicans, Melvin Ely to the Wizards, and Ariza, along with Alonzo Gee and Scotty Hopson, to the Rockets.

On February 6, 2015, he tied a season-high with 24 points in a 117–111 win. This was during a streak of 172 straight games played.

On January 24, 2016, he scored a season-high 29 points and made a season-high six three-pointers in a 115–104 win over the Dallas Mavericks. He topped that mark the following night, scoring 31 points in a 112–111 win over the New Orleans Pelicans. On February 27, he made two three-pointers against the San Antonio Spurs to extend his streak with at least one three-pointer to 29 games, the longest streak by a Rockets player since 39 in a row by Aaron Brooks in the 2009–10 season. The streak ended at 30 after shooting 0-of-8 from three-point range against the New Orleans Pelicans on March 2.

On January 17, 2018, Ariza was suspended for two games without pay for entering the Los Angeles Clippers' locker room after a game against the team two days earlier.

In Game 2 of the 2018 Western Conference Finals, on May 17, 2018, Ariza helped tie the series with 19 points and 6 assists in a 127–105 victory over the Golden State Warriors. In Game 7 of the series, a deciding loss, Ariza missed all 9 of his 3-point attempts, and the Rockets set an NBA playoff record for most consecutive 3-point attempts missed with 27.

=== Phoenix Suns (2018) ===
On July 6, 2018, Ariza signed a one-year, $15 million contract with the Phoenix Suns. In his debut for the Suns in their season opener on October 17, 2018, Ariza recorded 21 points, eight rebounds and seven assists in a 121–100 win over the Dallas Mavericks.

=== Return to Washington (2018–2019) ===
On December 17, 2018, Ariza was traded to the Washington Wizards for Austin Rivers and Kelly Oubre Jr. On January 13, 2019, he narrowly missed his second career triple-double, recording 23 points, 10 assists and nine rebounds in a 140–138 double-overtime loss to the Toronto Raptors.

=== Sacramento Kings (2019–2020) ===
On July 7, 2019, Ariza inked a two-year deal worth $25 million with the Sacramento Kings. On January 6, 2020, Ariza scored a season-high 18 points and grabbed 6 rebounds in a 111–99 win over the Golden State Warriors.

=== Portland Trail Blazers (2020) ===
On January 20, 2020, Ariza was traded to the Portland Trail Blazers along with Wenyen Gabriel and Caleb Swanigan in exchange for future teammate Kent Bazemore, Anthony Tolliver, and two future second-round draft picks.

On June 22, 2020, during the COVID-19 pandemic, Ariza announced he would not be returning to the NBA season's restart in Orlando. Instead, he committed to a one-month visitation window with his young son, sources told ESPN.

On November 22, 2020, Ariza, the draft rights to Isaiah Stewart, and a conditional future first-round pick were traded to the Houston Rockets in exchange for Robert Covington. On November 24, Ariza and Stewart were traded to the Detroit Pistons in exchange for Christian Wood, as part of a sign-and-trade deal. On November 27, Ariza, Justin Jackson, a 2023 second-round pick (from either Dallas or Miami), and a 2026 second-round pick were traded to the Oklahoma City Thunder in a three-team trade involving the Detroit Pistons. Ariza never reported to the Thunder or appeared in any games for them during his stint, as he was away from the team due to family matters.

=== Miami Heat (2021) ===
On March 17, 2021, Ariza was traded to his hometown team the Miami Heat in exchange for center Meyers Leonard and a future second round draft pick. It was the ninth time that he had been traded in his career, the most in NBA history (he was traded a total of 11 times across his career). He played 30 games and started 27 of them, averaging 9.4 points, 1.8 assists, and 4.8 rebounds.

=== Return to the Lakers (2021–2022) ===
On August 6, 2021, Ariza signed with the Los Angeles Lakers on a one-year deal worth $2.6 million. On October 6, he underwent a procedure on his right ankle. He was out for most of the first half, which Lakers head coach Frank Vogel said "did derail most of his season and his impact on our team this year". On April 7, 2022, Ariza was waived. He played in 24 games with 11 starts, averaging four points and shooting 33.3%.

== Personal life ==
On March 18, 1996, Ariza's youngest brother, Tajh Ariza, died at age six after falling out of a hotel room window in Caracas, Venezuela. Ariza's older son Tajh, named after Ariza's late brother, is a five-star basketball prospect and one of the top recruits in the class of 2026. Ariza also has two children with his wife: son Tristan and daughter Taylor. As of 2020, Ariza had a foundation, Choices Mentoring program, which helps young African Americans work toward their professional goals by providing access to tutoring, scholarships, and counselors.

Ariza's stepfather, Kenny McClary, played at the University of Florida in the mid to late 1980s, and professionally with the Sydney Kings in Australia.

Ariza is of Turks and Caicos Islands and Dominican descent through his grandfather Osvaldo Ariza (a Turks and Caicos Islander of Dominican descent), and his parents, Lolita Ariza and Trevor Saunders of Grand Turk. Ariza once considered changing his citizenship to play for the Dominican Republic national basketball team. However, he later accepted an invitation to the Team USA training camp.

== NBA career statistics ==
Legend
GP	Games played	GS	Games started	MPG	Minutes per game
FG%	Field goal percentage	3P%	3-point field goal percentage	FT%	Free throw percentage
RPG	Rebounds per game	APG	Assists per game	SPG	Steals per game
BPG	Blocks per game	PPG	Points per game	**Bold**	Career high
†	Won an NBA championship	*	Led the league

=== Regular season ===
Year	Team	GP	GS	MPG	FG%	3P%	FT%	RPG	APG	SPG	BPG	PPG
2004–05	New York	80	12	17.3	.442	.231	.695	3.0	1.1	.9	.2	5.9
2005–06	New York	36	10	19.7	.418	.333	.545	3.8	1.3	1.2	.3	4.6
2005–06	Orlando	21	0	13.8	.400	.000	.700	3.9	.7	.7	.1	4.7
2006–07	Orlando	57	7	22.4	**.539**	.000	.620	4.4	1.1	1.0	.3	8.9
2007–08	Orlando	11	0	10.5	.452	.000	.533	2.2	.7	.5	.3	3.3
2007–08	L.A. Lakers	24	3	18.0	.524	.333	.683	3.5	1.5	1.1	.3	6.5
2008–09†	L.A. Lakers	**82***	20	24.4	.460	.319	.710	4.3	1.8	1.7	.3	8.9
2009–10	Houston	72	71	**36.5**	.394	.334	.649	5.6	**3.8**	1.8	**.6**	**14.9**
2010–11	New Orleans	75	75	34.7	.398	.303	.701	5.4	2.2	1.6	.4	11.0
2011–12	New Orleans	41	41	32.9	.417	.333	.775	5.2	3.3	1.7	**.6**	10.8
2012–13	Washington	56	15	26.3	.417	.364	.821	4.8	2.0	1.3	.4	9.5
2013–14	Washington	77	77	35.4	.456	**.407**	.772	**6.2**	2.5	1.6	.3	14.4
2014–15	Houston	**82**	**82***	35.7	.402	.350	.853	5.6	2.5	1.9	.3	12.8
2015–16	Houston	81	81	35.3	.416	.371	.783	4.5	2.3	**2.0**	.3	12.7
2016–17	Houston	80	80	34.7	.409	.344	.738	5.7	2.2	1.8	.3	11.7
2017–18	Houston	67	67	33.9	.412	.368	**.854**	4.4	1.6	1.5	.2	11.7
2018–19	Phoenix	26	26	34.0	.379	.360	.837	5.6	3.3	1.5	.3	9.9
2018–19	Washington	43	43	34.1	.409	.322	.777	5.3	**3.8**	1.2	.3	14.1
2019–20	Sacramento	32	0	24.7	.388	.352	.778	4.6	1.6	1.1	.2	6.0
2019–20	Portland	21	21	33.4	.491	.400	.872	4.8	2.0	1.6	.4	11.0
2020–21	Miami	30	27	28.0	.411	.350	.773	4.8	1.8	1.0	**.6**	9.4
2021–22	L.A. Lakers	24	11	19.3	.333	.270	.556	3.4	1.1	.5	.3	4.0
Career		1,118	769	29.5	.422	.351	.731	4.8	2.1	1.5	.3	10.4

=== Playoffs ===
Year	Team	GP	GS	MPG	FG%	3P%	FT%	RPG	APG	SPG	BPG	PPG
2007	Orlando	4	0	11.8	.313	.000	.250	2.3	1.3	.2	0	2.8
2008	L.A. Lakers	8	0	5.6	**.583**	.250	.500	1.4	.1	.1	.1	2.1
2009†	L.A. Lakers	**23**	**23**	31.4	.497	**.476**	.563	4.2	2.3	1.6	.4	11.3
2011	New Orleans	6	6	**40.2**	.412	.333	.727	6.5	**3.3**	1.3	**.5**	**15.5**
2014	Washington	11	11	37.0	.481	.446	.778	**8.9**	1.7	1.5	.4	13.6
2015	Houston	17	17	38.5	.426	.375	.905	6.4	2.6	1.8	.1	13.2
2016	Houston	5	5	36.2	.255	.143	.750	4.2	.8	**2.6***	.2	6.6
2017	Houston	11	11	37.5	.423	.377	**.929**	5.1	2.1	1.3	.2	10.7
2018	Houston	17	17	34.2	.360	.286	.742	3.8	1.3	1.1	.1	8.8
2021	Miami	4	4	24.0	.304	.294	.000	5.8	.5	.8	.3	4.8
Career		106	94	32.0	.423	.365	.722	5.0	1.8	1.3	.2	10.1

== See also ==
- List of National Basketball Association career steals leaders
- List of National Basketball Association career 3-point scoring leaders
