= Tony Stubblefield =

American basketball coach (born 1970)

Current position
- Title: Interim head coach
- Team: Oregon
- Conference: Big 10

Biographical details
- Born: March 28, 1970 (age 56)

Playing career
- 1989–1991: Laramie County Community College (Cheyenne, Wyoming)
- 1991–1993: Nebraska–Omaha

Coaching career (HC unless noted)
- 1993–1995: Nebraska–Omaha (asst.)
- 1995–1996: Texas–San Antonio (asst.)
- 1996–2000: Texas–Arlington (asst.)
- 2000–2005: New Mexico State (asst.)
- 2005: New Mexico State (Interim HC)
- 2005–2006: New Mexico State (asst.)
- 2006–2010: Cincinnati (asst.)
- 2010–2021: Oregon (asst.)
- 2021–2024: DePaul
- 2024–2026: Oregon (asst.)
- 2026–present: Oregon (Interim HC)

Head coaching record
- Overall: 30–66 (.313)

Anthony Gerard Stubblefield (born March 28, 1970) is an American college basketball coach who is the interim head coach for the University of Oregon men's basketball team. He previously served as the head men's basketball coach at DePaul University. He was also an assistant at the University of Cincinnati and New Mexico State University, where he also served as interim head coach during the 2004–2005 season due to Lou Henson's illness.

== Playing career ==
Stubblefield starred at Broomfield (Colorado) High School and played two seasons at Laramie County Community College in Cheyenne, Wyoming before transferring to Nebraska–Omaha for his final two years of eligibility. He'd serve as team captain his senior season.

== Coaching career ==
Stubblefield has served as an assistant coach at Omaha, Texas–San Antonio, Texas–Arlington, and New Mexico State after graduation. He was an interim head coach during the 2004–05 season for NMSU as Lou Henson battled non-Hodgkin lymphoma and compiled a 2–12 record. He was then hired at Cincinnati under Mick Cronin where he spent four seasons before serving as an assistant coach for Oregon until 2021.

=== DePaul ===
Stubblefield was hired on April 1, 2021 as the new head coach of the Blue Demons, replacing Dave Leitao. On January 22, 2024, DePaul parted ways with Stubblefield, relieving him of his head coaching duties.

=== Oregon ===
Stubblefield returned to Oregon in 2024, and following Dana Altman's retirement on October 7, 2026, he was named the interim head coach.

== Head coaching record ==
Record table
Season	Team	Overall	Conference	Standing	Postseason
New Mexico State Aggies (Sun Belt) (2005)
2004–05	New Mexico State	2–12	2–11	6th (West)	
New Mexico State:		2–12 (.143)	2–11 (.154)		
DePaul Blue Demons (Big East) (2021–2024)
2021–22	DePaul	15–16	6–14	T–9th	
2022–23	DePaul	10–23	3–17	10th	
2023–24	DePaul	3–15	0–7		
DePaul:		28–54 (.341)	9–38 (.191)		
Oregon Ducks (Big Ten) (2026–present)
2026–27	Oregon	3–1	0–0		
Oregon:		3–1 (.750)	0–0 (–)		
Total:		33–67 (.330)			
National champion Postseason invitational champion Conference regular season champion Conference regular season and conference tournament champion Division regular season champion Division regular season and conference tournament champion Conference tournament champion
