= Incarnate Word Cardinals men's basketball statistical leaders =

The Incarnate Word Cardinals men's basketball statistical leaders are individual statistical leaders of the Incarnate Word Cardinals men's basketball program in various categories, including points, rebounds, assists, steals, and blocks. Within those areas, the lists identify single-game, single-season, and career leaders. The Cardinals represent the University of the Incarnate Word (UIW) in the NCAA Division I Southland Conference.

Incarnate Word began competing in intercollegiate basketball in 1980, and did not start play in Division I until the 2013–14 season, having previously been in Division II. While the NCAA has recorded individual points and rebounds in all three of its current divisions throughout the history of UIW men's basketball, it did not record assists in D-II until the 1988–89 season, and blocks and steals until the 1992–93 season. Nonetheless, the UIW record books include players in these statistics before these seasons. These lists are updated through the end of the 2020–21 season.

== Scoring ==
Career
Rank	Player	Points	Seasons
1	Kenneth Watson	2,243	1991–92 1992–93 1993–94 1994–95
2	Pierce Caldwell	1,873	2006–07 2007–08 2008–09 2009–10
3	Denzel Livingston	1,716	2011–12 2012–13 2013–14 2014–15
4	Tripp Puhl	1,589	1987–88 1988–89 1989–90 1990–91
5	Kyle Hittle	1,569	2012–13 2013–14 2014–15 2015–16
6	Sean Sullivan	1,514	1986–87 1987–88 1988–89
7	Robert Tovar	1,350	2000–01 2001–02 2002–03 2003–04
8	Jesse Robinson	1,348	1989–90 1990–91 1991–92 1992–93
9	Tracy Robinson	1,333	2007–08 2008–09 2009–10 2010–11
10	Edward Armstrong	1,274	1996–97 1997–98 1998–99 1999–00

Season
Rank	Player	Points	Season
1	Milton Potter	745	1986–87
2	Kenneth Watson	742	1994–95
3	Randy Henderson	635	1992–93
4	Denzel Livingston	624	2014–15
5	Davion Bailey	600	2024–25
6	Sean Sullivan	587	1986–87
7	Davion Bailey	557	2025–26
8	Bo Conaway	553	1994–95
9	Denzel Livingston	548	2013–14
10	Dylan Hayman	547	2024–25

Single game
Rank	Player	Points	Season	Opponent
1	Kenneth Watson	43	1994–95	Huston-Tillotson

== Rebounds ==
Career
Rank	Player	Rebounds	Seasons
1	Tripp Puhl	832	1987–88 1988–89 1989–90 1990–91
2	Chris Johnson	789	2000–01 2001–02 2002–03 2003–04
3	Ricky Rhodes	764	1993–94 1994–95
4	Shawn Johnson	710	2014–15 2015–16 2016–17 2017–18
5	Tracy Robinson	652	2007–08 2008–09 2009–10 2010–11
6	Kyle Hittle	576	2012–13 2013–14 2014–15 2015–16
7	Kenneth Watson	549	1991–92 1992–93 1993–94 1994–95
8	Chris Johnson	544	2009–10 2010–11 2011–12
9	Denzel Livingston	537	2011–12 2012–13 2013–14 2014–15
10	Mark Tackett	485	1989–90 1990–91 1991–92 1992–93

Season
Rank	Player	Rebounds	Season
1	Ricky Rhodes	404	1994–95
2	Ricky Rhodes	360	1993–94
3	Milton Potter	290	1986–87
4	Jason Gant	285	2006–07
5	Mark Tackett	249	1992–93
6	Tripp Puhl	248	1990–91
7	Tripp Puhl	245	1989–90
8	Chris Johnson	239	2001–02
9	Tripp Puhl	237	1988–89
10	Calvin Williams	226	1997–98

Single game
Rank	Player	Rebounds	Season	Opponent
1	Ricky Rhodes	22	1993–94	Huston-Tillotson

== Assists ==
Career
Rank	Player	Assists	Seasons
1	Mitchell Badillo	498	2012–13 2013–14 2014–15 2015–16
2	Kenneth Watson	423	1991–92 1992–93 1993–94 1994–95
3	Chris Olivares	342	1997–98 1998–99 1999–00 2000–01
4	Eric Nuncio	309	2005–06 2007–08 2008–09
5	Denzel Livingston	297	2011–12 2012–13 2013–14 2014–15
6	Paul Connolly	289	2003–04 2004–05 2005–06 2006–07
7	Pierce Caldwell	280	2006–07 2007–08 2008–09 2009–10
8	Victor Molina	277	1988–89 1989–90 1990–91 1991–92
9	Ricky Rhodes	272	1993–94 1994–95
10	Shawn Gilbert	269	1991–92 1992–93 1993–94 1994–95

Season
Rank	Player	Assists	Season
1	Eric Nuncio	175	2007–08
2	Jalin Anderson	171	2024–25
3	Ricky Rhodes	148	1994–95
4	Mitchell Badillo	138	2015–16
5	Chris Olivares	135	2000–01
	Mitchell Badillo	135	2014–15
	Jalin Hart	135	2016–17
8	Eric Nuncio	134	2008–09
9	Kenneth Watson	133	1992–93
10	Bryan Toma	131	1990–91

Single game
Rank	Player	Assists	Season	Opponent
1	Bryan Toma	15	1990–91	Mary Hardin-Baylor

== Steals ==
Career
Rank	Player	Steals	Seasons
1	Shaun Umeh	228	2008–09 2009–10 2010–11 2011–12
2	Denzel Livingston	214	2011–12 2012–13 2013–14 2014–15
3	Tripp Puhl	169	1987–88 1988–89 1989–90 1990–91
4	Kenneth Watson	165	1991–92 1992–93 1993–94 1994–95
5	Shawn Johnson	137	2014–15 2015–16 2016–17 2017–18
6	Robert Tovar	136	2000–01 2001–02 2002–03 2003–04
	Shawn Gilbert	136	1991–92 1992–93 1993–94 1994–95
8	Mitchell Badillo	131	2012–13 2013–14 2014–15 2015–16
9	Eric Nuncio	128	2005–06 2007–08 2008–09
10	Chris Johnson	127	2009–10 2010–11 2011–12

Season
Rank	Player	Steals	Season
1	Denzel Livingston	74	2014–15
2	Eric Nuncio	72	2007–08
3	Shaun Umeh	70	2009–10
4	Denzel Livingston	68	2013–14
5	Jamar Love	66	2002–03
6	Tripp Puhl	64	1990–91
7	Shaun Umeh	62	2011–12
8	Lyn'Dale Brown	60	2012–13
	Shawn Gilbert	60	1994–95
10	Ricky Rhodes	59	1994–95

Single game
Rank	Player	Steals	Season	Opponent
1	Chris Olivares	8	2000–01	Schreiner
	Eric Nuncio	8	2007–08	Texas Lutheran

== Blocks ==
Career
Rank	Player	Blocks	Seasons
1	Charlie Oppermann	211	1987–88 1988–89 1989–90
2	Shawn Johnson	150	2014–15 2015–16 2016–17 2017–18
3	Denzel Livingston	128	2011–12 2012–13 2013–14 2014–15
4	Chris Johnson	105	2000–01 2001–02 2002–03 2003–04
5	Jawan Bailey	92	2008–09
6	Devin Wyatt	82	2016–17 2017–18
7	Tracy Robinson	74	2007–08 2008–09 2009–10 2010–11
8	Bo Conaway	73	1993–94 1994–95
9	Jayden Williams	65	2024–25 2025–26
10	Chris Johnson	58	2009–10 2010–11 2011–12
	Ian Markolf	58	2011–12 2013–14

Season
Rank	Player	Blocks	Season
1	Jawan Bailey	92	2008–09
2	Charlie Oppermann	89	1987–88
3	Charlie Oppermann	62	1988–89
4	Charlie Oppermann	60	1989–90
5	Devin Wyatt	52	2016–17
6	Jayden Williams	51	2024–25
7	Shawn Johnson	46	2016–17
8	Shawn Johnson	44	2017–18
9	Denzel Livingston	41	2012–13
	Bo Conaway	41	1994–95

Single game
Rank	Player	Blocks	Season	Opponent
1	Charlie Oppermann	7	1987–88	Texas Lutheran
	Jawan Bailey	7	2008–09	Howard Payne
	Jawan Bailey	7	2008–09	Angelo State
