= Quinn Costello =

American basketball player (born 2007)

No. 8 – Michigan Wolverines
- Position: Power forward
- Conference: Big Ten Conference

Personal information
- Born: July 8, 2007 (age 19)
- Listed height: 6 ft 10 in (2.08 m)
- Listed weight: 220 lb (100 kg)

Career information
- High school: The Newman School (Boston, Massachusetts)
- College: Michigan (2026–present)

Career highlights
- McDonald's All-American (2026); Jordan Brand Classic (2026)

Quinn Costello (born July 8, 2007) is an American college basketball player for the Michigan Wolverines of the Big Ten Conference. He was a 2026 McDonald's All-American as a senior in high school.

== High school career ==
Costello attended The Newman School in Boston, and played for the Middlesex Magic on the Under Armour Association circuit. During his senior year, he averaged 16.4 points and 8.1 rebounds per game midseason. On November 15, 2025, he scored 17 points and 15 rebounds for his first double-double of the season. On November 22, 2025, he scored a career-high 36 points at the National Prep Showcase.

On February 2, 2026 he was named to the 2026 McDonald's All-American Boys Game. He and future teammate Brandon McCoy Jr. were representatives of Michigan's 2026 freshman class. In 15 minutes, Costello recorded seven points, three rebounds and two steals in the game. Costello was also selected to participate in the Jordan Brand Classic All-Star Game.

=== Recruitment ===
On September 16, 2025, Costello committed to play college basketball for Michigan, over offers from Michigan State, Minnesota, North Carolina, Purdue and Texas. He was rated as the No. 1 player in the state of Massachusetts by 247Sports, Rivals and ESPN. Costello was ranked as a top player in the nation, finishing #31 by ESPN and #24 by Rivals.

== College career ==
In November 2025, Costello signed to play college basketball at the University of Michigan for Dusty May and the Wolverines in 2026–27. After May departed to coach the Dallas Mavericks in June 2026, Costello remained with the program under newly promoted head coach, Mike Boynton. On November 2, Costello debuted with 13 points against Oakland. On November 11, he made five three point shots for 15 points against Marquette.
