= Denzel Livingston =

American basketball player (born 1993)

BC Rustavi
- Position: Point guard / shooting guard
- League: Georgian Superliga

Personal information
- Born: April 18, 1993 (age 33) Houston, Texas
- Listed height: 6 ft 4 in (1.93 m)
- Listed weight: 178 lb (81 kg)

Career information
- High school: Waltrip (Houston, Texas)
- College: Incarnate Word (2011–2015)
- NBA draft: 2015: undrafted
- Playing career: 2015–present

Career history
- 2015–2016: Rio Grande Valley Vipers
- 2016–2017: Hapoel Kfar Saba
- 2017–2018: Ironi Nahariya
- 2018–2019: Ironi Kiryat Ata
- 2019–present: BC Rustavi

Career highlights
- First-team All-Southland (2015); Second-team All-Southland (2014); Southland All-Defensive Team (2014)
- Stats at Basketball Reference

Denzel Livingston (born April 18, 1993) is an American professional basketball player who last played for BC Rustavi of the Georgian Superliga. He played college basketball for Incarnate Word before playing in the NBA G League and Israel.

== High school career ==
Livingston played basketball at local Waltrip High School, leading them to three playoff appearances. He led the city of Houston and District 21-4A in scoring as a senior, earned first team All-District 21-4A honors and was the co-MVP.

== College career ==
After graduating high school, Livingston joined Incarnate Word when the school was still part of NCAA Division II and the Lone Star Conference, helping the Cardinals to get more relevance, specially on his last two seasons, which were among the best in school history. As a junior, he averaged 20.3 points, 6.4 rebounds, 3.8 assists and 2.5 steals per game and he followed that with 21.5 points, 5.9 rebounds, 2.9 assists and 2.6 steals per game as a senior while finishing in the top 10 nationally in steals on both years and being in the top five in scoring as a senior.

In his junior year, Livingston earned second team all-Southland Conference and all-Southland Conference Defensive Team honors and as a senior he grabbed first team all-Southland Conference and first team NABC All-District 23 honors while being named to the Lou Henson Award Mid-Season Watch List.

== Professional career ==
After going undrafted in the 2015 NBA draft, Livingston joined the Houston Rockets for the 2015 NBA Summer League. On September 3, 2015, he signed with the Rockets, only to be waived by the team on October 23 after appearing in four preseason games.

On November 2, he was acquired by the Rio Grande Valley Vipers of the NBA Development League as an affiliate player of the Rockets.

In August, 2016, Livingston signed with Hapoel Kfar Saba of the Israeli Liga Leumit. On October 10, he made his debut in a 92–86 win over Hapoel Haifa, recording 26 points, nine rebounds, one steal and one block in 39 minutes.

On June 28, 2017, Livingston signed a one-year deal with Ironi Nahariya of the Israeli Premier League. On November 6, 2017, Livingston recorded a double-double and season-high of 23 points and 13 rebounds, shooting 6-of-9 from the field, in a 73–92 blowout loss to Hapoel Gilboa Galil.

On August 1, 2018, Livingston signed with Ironi Kiryat Ata for the 2018–19 season. In 27 games played for Kiryat Ata, he averaged 14.4 points, 6.2 rebounds, 2.7 assists and 2.1 steals per game.

== Personal life ==
Livingston is the son of Edward and Dorothy Livingston and is studying general business. He has three brothers; Jerel Wiley, Cory Hubert and Reggie Hubert.
