= Anton Bonke =

Vanuatuan basketball player (born 2004)

No. 34 – Michigan State Spartans
- Position: Center
- League: Big Ten Conference

Personal information
- Born: August 4, 2004 (age 22) Netherlands
- Listed height: 7 ft 2 in (2.18 m)
- Listed weight: 266 lb (121 kg)

Career information
- High school: Lycée Français J. M. G. Le Clézio (Port Vila, Vanuatu)
- College: Eastern Arizona (2023–2024); Providence (2024–2025); Charlotte (2025–2026); Michigan State (2026–present)

Career history
- 2021: Seveners United

Career highlights
- Shefa Basketball League champion (2021)

Anton Bonke
Medal record

Men's rowing

Representing Vanuatu

Oceania U19 Indoor Championships
Gold medal – first place	2021 virtual	2000 m
Gold medal – first place	2022 virtual	500 m
Gold medal – first place	2022 virtual	1000 m
Bronze medal – third place	2021 virtual	500 m

Antonie Bonke (born August 4, 2004) is a Dutch-born Ni-Vanuatu college basketball player for the Michigan State Spartans. He previously played for the Eastern Arizona Gila Monsters, Providence Friars, and Charlotte 49ers. Bonke stands 7 ft 2 in (2.18 m) and plays the center position.

== Early life ==
Anton Bonke was born to Helle Bonke on August 4, 2004, and has two brothers. According to him, his mother "always wanted to live on a tourist island". Following his parents' separation, Bonke moved with his mother and his siblings from their native Netherlands to Fiji, New Zealand, and Australia, before eventually settling in Port Vila, Vanuatu, when he was around five years old. He grew up on the island of Efate and learned to speak Bislama.

Bonke was raised around the water, competing in open water swimming as well as short distance races. He started rowing competitively in 2021 after serving as a training partner for Vanuatuan Olympic rower Rio Rii. At his first international competition, Bonke won two historic medals for Vanuatu in the under-19 division at the 2021 Oceania Indoor Rowing Championships, including gold in the 2000 meter event and bronze in the 500 m. This qualified him to represent Vanuatu at the 2022 World Rowing Junior Championships, where he placed third in the D-final of the under-19 men's single sculls event. Bonke received a scholarship to train in Australia under the guidance of Olympic medallist Laryssa Biesenthal in preparation for the event. He later won two more gold medals in the under-19 division at the 2022 Oceania Indoor Rowing Championships, placing first in both the 500 m and 1000 m events. However, Bonke stated that he saw rowing as more of a conditioning exercise and always dreamed of playing basketball in the United States.

=== Early basketball career ===
Bonke attended Lycée Français J. M. G. Le Clézio in Port Vila, though it did not have a basketball team, and graduated high school at age 16 due to skipping grades. Instead, he played with a friend on the only hoop in the area and learned the game by watching online videos. Bonke suited up for Seveners United of the Shefa Basketball League (SBL) in 2021, helping them win the Shefa Independence Tournament, the SBL championship final, and the Shefa Closing of the Year Tournament. During a trip to Australia, he met the National Basketball League player Jason Cadee, who helped him send his tape to American coaches. To further increase his exposure, Bonke relocated to Davis, California, where he stayed with a friend's family. "I spent alot [sic] of time at rec centers, and fitness centers playing pick up basketball", he said. "I hadn't gotten to do this back home, so it was alot of fun to just play with other good players." While in Davis, Bonke met someone who played at Eastern Arizona College (EAC) and was able to connect him with the EAC coaching staff. He drove to the school's campus in Thatcher, Arizona, worked out for the coaches, and was offered a full scholarship to play college basketball at EAC.

== College career ==
Bonke played his first season of college basketball at Eastern Arizona in 2023–2024, averaging 9.8 points and 5.8 rebounds per game in 17 appearances (including 16 starts) for the Gila Monsters. He reportedly attracted several mid-major offers after his very first game with the team. In January 2024, it was announced that Bonke would be enrolling at Providence College for the spring semester after visiting the school the previous month, joining the Friars under head coach Kim English as a midyear transfer. However, due to midyear transfer rules, he was ineligible to compete in games and was limited to practices for the remainder for the 2023–24 season. In 2024–25, Bonke averaged 1.3 points and 1.2 rebounds per game in limited minutes for the Friars. After the conclusion of the season, he entered the NCAA transfer portal.

In 2025, Bonke transferred to the University of North Carolina at Charlotte to play for the 49ers under head coach Aaron Fearne. In his team debut on November 3, 2025, he posted a double-double, recording 10 points and 14 rebounds in a 92–76 win over Indiana State; he was declared "the center [the] 49ers need" in The Charlotte Observer. On January 28, 2026, Bonke scored a career-high 25 points and grabbed nine rebounds in an 80–76 overtime win over Temple. On February 25, he made two free throws with 2.4 seconds remaining to seal an 80–79 comeback win over North Texas. On March 12, in the second round of the American Conference tournament, Bonke registered a career-high 16 rebounds in a 74–60 win over Tulane. He appeared in all 34 games (including 32 starts) on the season, averaging 10.6 points and a team-high 8.3 rebounds per game.

After one season at Charlotte, Bonke entered the transfer portal in 2026 as a graduate student. He was rated as a four-star transfer recruit as well as the No. 13 and No. 21 center in the portal by Rivals.com and 247Sports, respectively. Bonke also declared for the 2026 NBA draft, while maintaining his NCAA eligibility through the draft process. On April 22, he committed to transfer to Michigan State University, while simultaneously remaining in the draft process. Bonke withdrew his name from the draft a few days later.

== National team career ==
Bonke has reportedly expressed interest in playing for the Vanuatu men's national basketball team. In 2026, national team head coach Sam Lewis stated, "If we can bring him into the squad, it changes everything."

== Career statistics ==
Legend
GP	Games played	GS	Games started	MPG	Minutes per game
FG%	Field goal percentage	3P%	3-point field goal percentage	FT%	Free throw percentage
RPG	Rebounds per game	APG	Assists per game	SPG	Steals per game
BPG	Blocks per game	PPG	Points per game	**Bold**	Career high

=== College ===
Year	Team	GP	GS	MPG	FG%	3P%	FT%	RPG	APG	SPG	BPG	PPG
2024–25	Providence	16	1	6.6	**.750**	–	.500	1.2	0.3	–	0.3	1.3
2025–26	Charlotte	**34**	**32**	**25.6**	.576	**.342**	**.653**	**8.3**	**1.0**	**0.2**	**1.5**	**10.6**

== Personal life ==
Bonke's older brother is a retired commercial diver in Vanuatu, while his younger brother also plays basketball.
