= The Newman School =

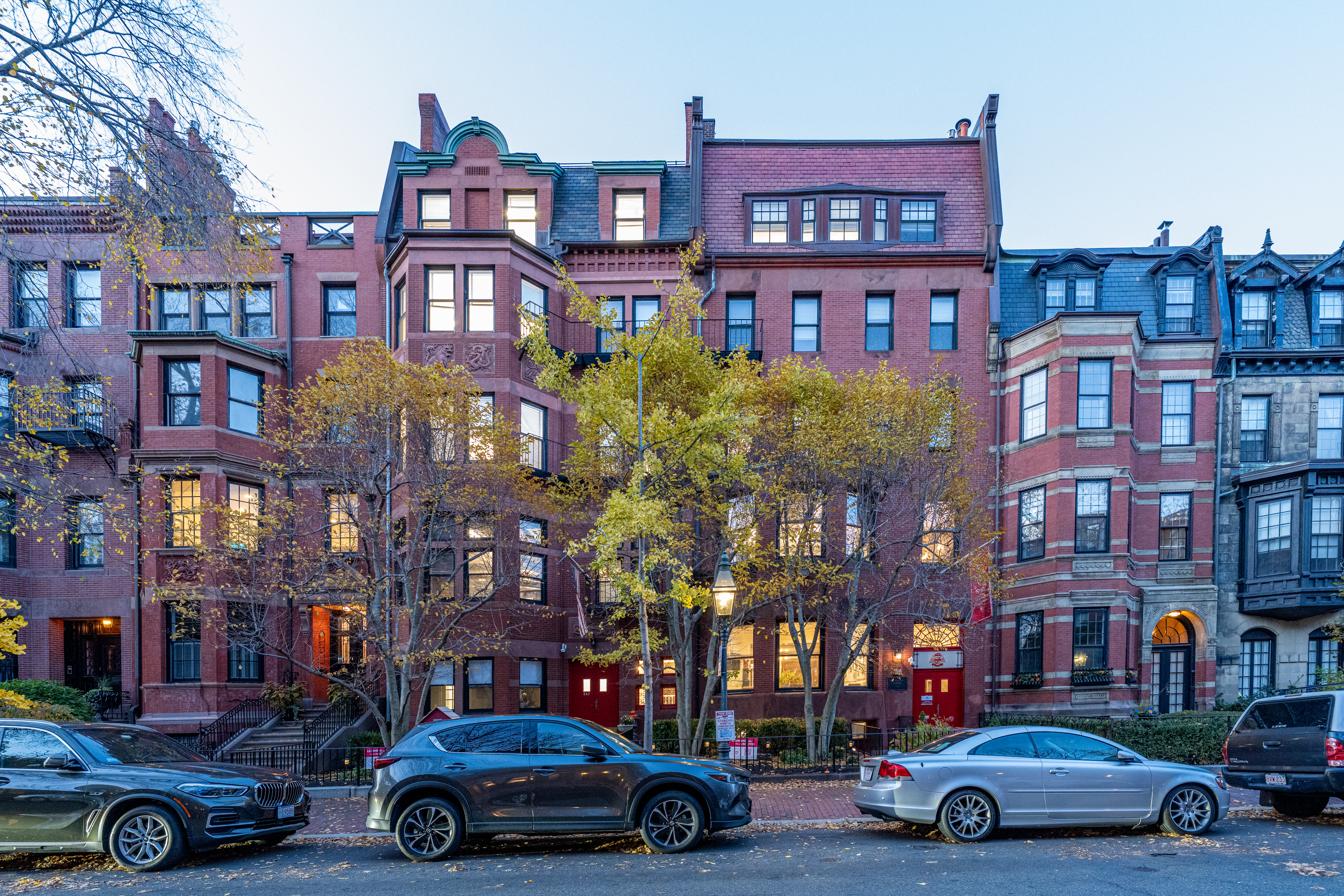
- (2025)

Location
- 245-247 Marlborough St, Back Bay, Boston, MA 02116, USA; Greater Boston
- 42.3531°N 71.080°W

Information
- Former name: Newman Preparatory School
- Type: Preparatory School
- Motto: Cardinal Newman’s motto, "Cor ad Cor Loquitur" (Let Heart Speak to Heart)
- Religious affiliation: None
- Patron saint: John Henry Newman
- Established: 1945
- Founder: J. Harry Lynch
- CEEB code: 220330
- NCES School ID: 00603971
- Head of school: Julie Porrazzo
- Key people: Walter J. Egan
- Grades: 7 to 12
- Website: www.newmanboston.org

The Newman School is a private school in the Back Bay district of Boston, Massachusetts.

== History ==
The Newman School was founded as Newman Preparatory School in 1945, the centennial of John Henry Cardinal Newman's conversion to Roman Catholicism, by Dr. J. Harry Lynch and a group of Catholic laymen, for the purpose of providing college preparation to veterans returning from service to their country in World War II. Over the years, Newman Prep evolved into a co-educational, diploma-granting program, and eventually began to accept younger students into the ninth grade. During the 1960s, the school operated The Newman School for Boys as a separate four-year (grades nine through twelve) and then six-year (grades seven through twelve) college preparatory school. Walter J. Egan was head of the School for Boys during most of its existence. In 2020, Michael Schafer took over as head of school. Julie Porrazzo became head of school in July 2026.

Now known as The Newman School, Newman provides a liberal arts education to a diverse group of approximately 250 American and international students. The student body is composed of students from the Greater Boston area with 50 percent of them coming from the city of Boston itself. International students come from Albania, Australia, Brazil, Canada, China, Croatia, Czech Republic, Denmark, Ethiopia, Germany, Greece, Hong Kong, India, Iran, Italy, Japan, Kazakhstan, Mexico, Russia, Scotland, South Korea, Spain, Switzerland, Thailand and Vietnam among other countries. In 2024, the school bought a new property on Newbury Street for $8.5 million. This property will serve as a dormitory from the 2025–26 academic year.

== Academics ==
In addition to a traditional curriculum, The Newman School offers an International Baccalaureate Diploma Programme that students may take advantage of in their junior and senior years. The school also offers the IB Middle Years Programme for grades 7–10, and the IB Diploma Programme for grades 11–12.

== Extracurriculars ==
The Newman School offers several clubs which take place both during the school day and through after school programs including Model United Nations, Newsman, Chess Club, Environmental Club, Debate, Robotics and Yearbook.

== Athletics ==
Newman competes in Division B of the Massachusetts Bay Independent League. Their team has traditionally had rivalries with Commonwealth School and Boston University Academy due to its proximity to both, despite being much lower ranked than them.

=== Sailing ===
The sailing team sails out of the CBI boathouse on the Charles River.

=== Tennis ===
The Newman tennis team has access to courts affiliated with the Winchester Tennis Club.

=== Other Sports ===
The school also has AA and varsity basketball teams for boys and girls, varsity Soccer teams for boys, girls and a mixed gender Middle School team, recreational sports and varsity cross country.

== AAA Basketball ==
Since 2022, the school has operated an AAA basketball team, which is NEPSAC's only boarding school in Boston. Jackson Johnson has served as head coach for the team since its founding, with former Boston Celtics head coach John Carroll having a key daily role in the team. In 2024–25, Newman won their first NEPSAC AAA Championship, which they repeated in 2025–26 with Regular Season and Championship victories. That same season, Newman won four trophies, including their first New England Basketball League and National Prep Championship titles. Quinn Costello was a part of the Newman championship winning teams.

== Tuition ==
Tuition for the 2025–2026 academic year is $68,000 for boarding students, and $34,000 for day students.

== Alumni ==
- Marty Walsh, 6th Executive Director of the National Hockey League Players’ Association, former Secretary of Labor under Joe Biden and former mayor of Boston
- Joe Moakley, former Democratic member of the U.S. House of Representatives (MA-9) and Chairman of the U.S. House Committee on Rules
- Quinn Costello, Class of 2026 basketball player recruited for the Michigan Wolverines
- Charles Taylor (Liberian politician), former Liberian president
