= J. P. Estrella =

American basketball player (born 2004)

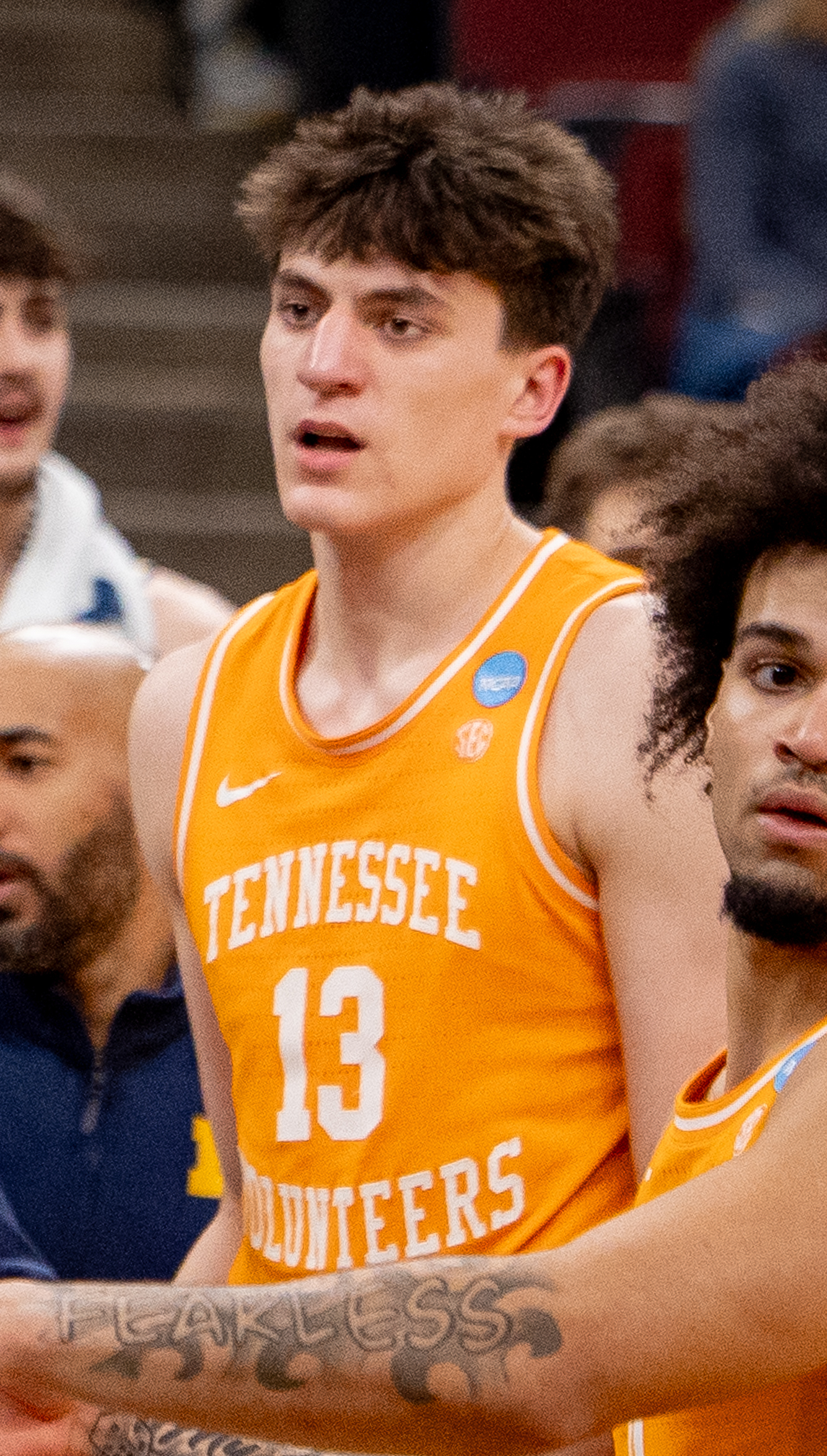
- Estrella with Tennessee in 2026

No. 13 – Michigan Wolverines
- Position: Power forward
- Conference: Big Ten Conference

Personal information
- Born: September 3, 2004 (age 22) Fall River, Massachusetts, U.S.
- Listed height: 6 ft 11 in (2.11 m)
- Listed weight: 240 lb (109 kg)

Career information
- High school: Scarborough (Scarborough, Maine); South Portland (South Portland, Maine); Brewster Academy (Wolfeboro, New Hampshire)
- College: Tennessee (2023–2026); Michigan (2026–present)

Joseph Peter Estrella (born September 3, 2004) is an American college basketball player for the Michigan Wolverines of the Big Ten Conference. He previously played for the Tennessee Volunteers.

== Early life and high school career ==
Estrella was born to Mark and Allison Estrella, and has a younger brother, Cameron. His mother, Allie, was named Miss Maine Basketball in 1995, and played college basketball at Boston College from 1995 to 1999.

Estrella began his high school career at Scarborough High School in Scarborough, Maine, competing primarily with the junior varsity team. He then attended South Portland High School in South Portland, Maine for two years. During his junior year he averaged 20.2 points, 11.8 rebounds and 4.1 blocks per game. During the Class AA state championship against Oxford Hills, he recorded 19 points, 15 rebounds and five blocks, to help the Red Riot win their first state championship since 1992. He transferred to Brewster Academy in Wolfeboro, New Hampshire for his senior year.

=== Recruiting ===
Estrella was a consensus four-star recruit and the best prospect from the state of Maine. On September 2, 2022, he committed to playing college basketball for Tennessee over offers from Iowa, Marquette, Syracuse, Duke and Kansas.

== College career ==
=== Tennessee ===
During the 2023–24 season, in his freshman year, he appeared in 25 games, including eight of the final 10 games. He made his 2024 NCAA tournament debut during the first round against Saint Peter's and scored six points in eight minutes. He played a career-high 15 minutes in the Elite Eight, losing to Purdue 66–72. During the 2024–25 season, in his sophomore year, he averaged 4.7 points and 2.7 rebounds per game in the first three games of the year, before suffering a season-ending injury. He underwent surgery to repair a stress fracture in his left foot in November 2024.

During the 2025–26 season, in his red-shirt sophomore year, he averaged 10 points and 5.4 rebounds per game. He appeared in 33 games, with 13 starts and missed four games due to injury. He led the team with 92 offensive rebounds, and finished eighth on Tennessee's single-season leaderboard for both field-goal percentage (59.6) and offensive rebounding average (2.788). On November 8, 2025, against Northern Kentucky, he recorded a then career-high 17 points and 11 rebounds, for his first career double-double. The next game against North Florida, on November 12, 2025, he scored a career-high 23 points on 11-of-14 shooting, and ten rebounds, for his second consecutive double-double. He became the fourth SEC player since 2020 with 11-plus made field goals on fewer than 15 attempts and 10-plus rebounds, joining Jonas Aidoo, Oscar Tshiebwe and Tolu Smith III. On November 17, 2025, against Rice, he suffered a bone bruise on his left leg late in the first half and didn't return during the game. He missed the following game against Tennessee State. On December 30, 2025, against South Carolina State, he recorded 12 points and ten rebounds, for his third career double-double. He had a career-high seven offensive rebounds and career-high tying three assists. On March 3, 2026, against South Carolina, he scored a team-high 22 points. During the final game of the regular season against rival Vanderbilt on March 7, he recorded 20 points and ten rebounds, his second consecutive 20 point game, and fourth career double-double. During the first round of the 2026 NCAA tournament against Miami (OH), he recorded 14 points, ten rebounds, and a career-high two steals, for his fifth career double-double. He became the fifteenth Volunteer to record a double-double during the NCAA tournament. Following the season, he entered the NCAA transfer portal.

=== Michigan ===
On April 9, 2026, Estrella transferred to the University of Michigan to play for Dusty May and the Wolverines.
