= Tajh Ariza =

American basketball player (born 2008)

Oregon Ducks
- Position: Small forward
- Conference: Big Ten Conference

Personal information
- Born: March 22, 2008 (age 18)
- Listed height: 6 ft 9 in (2.06 m)
- Listed weight: 200 lb (91 kg)

Career information
- High school: St. Bernard (Playa Del Rey, California); Westchester (Los Angeles, California); St. John Bosco (Bellflower, California)
- College: Oregon (2026–present)

Tajh Ariza (born March 22, 2008) is an American college basketball player for the Oregon Ducks of the Big Ten Conference.

== Early life ==
Ariza was born on March 25, 2008, and grew up in Playa Del Rey, California. His father, Trevor, played in the NBA. He first attended St. Bernard High School in Playa Del Rey, where he was a top basketball player. He had only received three major NCAA Division I offers to play college basketball by the end of his freshman year, but after his sophomore season became one of the top-ranked recruits nationally. Ariza transferred to Westchester High School, where his father had attended, for his junior year. He averaged 27 points and 14 rebounds in his junior year and was named a MaxPreps Junior All-American, helping Westchester to the City Section championship and an appearance in the quarterfinals of the Division II state playoffs. After the season, he transferred to St. John Bosco High School for his senior year.

Ariza is ranked a five-star recruit and one of the top-20 prospects nationally in the class of 2026. He committed to play college basketball for the Oregon Ducks, being the highest-ranking Oregon commit in three years.
