= Mike Boynton =

American basketball player and coach (born 1982)

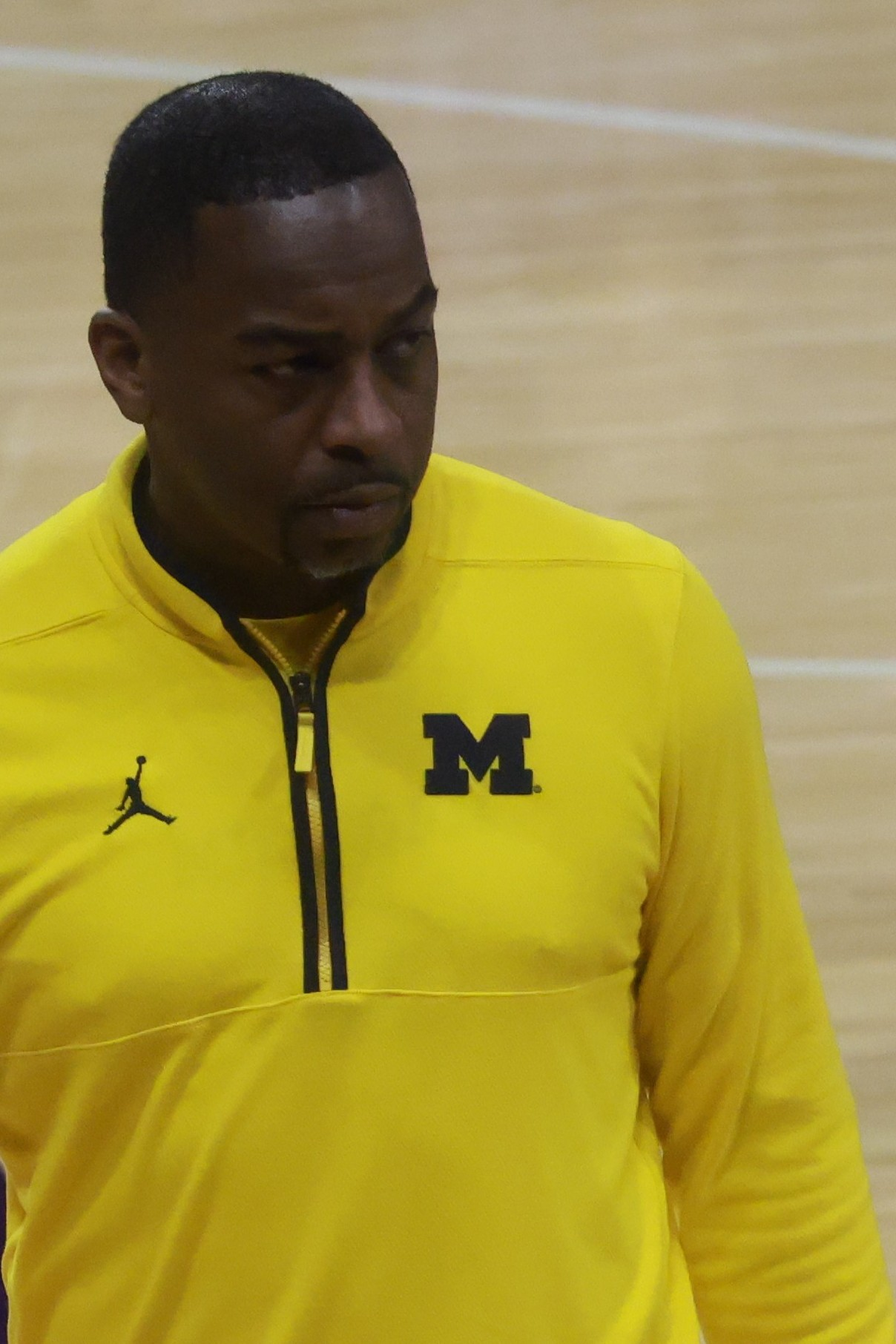
- Boynton with the Michigan Wolverines in 2026

Current position
- Title: Head coach
- Team: Michigan
- Conference: Big Ten
- Record: 3–2 (.600)
- Annual salary: $3.6 million

Biographical details
- Born: January 17, 1982 (age 44); Brooklyn, New York, U.S.

Playing career
- 2000–2004: South Carolina
- Position: Point guard

Coaching career (HC unless noted)
- 2004–2005: Furman (graduate assistant)
- 2005–2007: Coastal Carolina (assistant)
- 2007–2008: Wofford (associate HC)
- 2008–2013: South Carolina (assistant)
- 2013–2016: Stephen F. Austin (assistant)
- 2016–2017: Oklahoma State (assistant)
- 2017–2024: Oklahoma State
- 2024–2026: Michigan (assistant / defensive coordinator)
- 2026–present: Michigan

Head coaching record
- Overall: 122–111 (.524)
- Tournaments: 1–1 (NCAA Division I); 4–2 (NIT)

Accomplishments and honors

Championships
- As an assistant: NCAA Division I tournament (2026); Big Ten regular season (2026); Big Ten tournament (2025)

Michael Boynton Jr. (born January 17, 1982) is an American college basketball coach, currently the Wolverines men's basketball head coach at the University of Michigan. He was previously an assistant coach at Michigan under Dusty May, before replacing him in 2026. Prior to that, Boynton was the head coach at Oklahoma State University from 2017 to 2024.

== Playing career ==
A native of Brooklyn, New York, Boynton led his Bishop Loughlin Memorial High School basketball team to the city semifinals and earned first team All-New York City honors, averaging 15 points, 4 rebounds and 11 assists per game.

As a college basketball player for the University of South Carolina from 2000 to 2004, Boynton made 129 three-pointers in 125 career games, finishing in the top ten all-time and fourth in career games played with the Gamecocks. Boynton made the NCAA Tournament while with South Carolina in 2004. He graduated with a degree in African-American Studies.

== Coaching career ==
=== Early years ===
Boynton's coaching career began as a graduate manager at Furman University in 2004. He then was an assistant coach at Coastal Carolina University from 2005 to 2007, before joining Wofford College as the associate head coach for one season. Boynton returned to his alma mater, South Carolina, in 2008 as an assistant coach and stayed until 2013. He followed assistant coach Brad Underwood when he became the head coach for Stephen F. Austin State University in 2013. When Underwood accepted the head coaching position at Oklahoma State in 2016, Boynton again followed him as a member of his staff.

=== Oklahoma State ===
On March 24, 2017, Boynton was named the 20th head coach at Oklahoma State University following Underwood's departure to Illinois. In 2020, Boynton recruited, signed and coached Cade Cunningham into being selected with the No. 1 overall pick in the 2021 NBA draft after his freshman season. In 2022 and 2023, he was named the head coach of the United States national under-19 team. USA won the gold medal at the 2022 FIBA Under-18 Americas Championship. The team placed fourth in the 2023 FIBA Under-19 Basketball World Cup. On March 14, 2024, Boynton was fired from Oklahoma State after reaching the NCAA tournament once in seven years.

=== Michigan ===
In April 2024, Boynton was the first assistant coach hired by new head coach Dusty May at the University of Michigan. Boynton was given the responsibility of the defensive coordinator for the Michigan Wolverines. After helping lead the team to the national championship in 2026, Boynton was promoted to interim head coach when Dusty May left to coach the Dallas Mavericks on June 23, 2026. After retaining the entire incoming roster for the next season, Boynton was named the official head basketball coach on July 10, 2026, signing a two-year deal. He continued on as defensive coordinator. His contract was worth $7.6 million over the two years, with $3.6 million included in his first season and a non-guaranteed $4 million for the second season. His yearly average annual salary was nearly identical to his predecessor, May, who received an average of $3.75 million upon first being named head coach.

== Head coaching record ==
Record table
Season	Team	Overall	Conference	Standing	Postseason
Oklahoma State Cowboys (Big 12 Conference) (2017–2024)
2017–18	Oklahoma State	21–15	8–10	T–6th	NIT Quarterfinals
2018–19	Oklahoma State	12–20	5–13	9th	
2019–20	Oklahoma State	18–14	7–11	T–7th	
2020–21	Oklahoma State	21–9	11–7	5th	NCAA Division I Round of 32
2021–22	Oklahoma State	15–15	8–10	5th	ineligible
2022–23	Oklahoma State	20–16	8–10	7th	NIT Quarterfinals
2023–24	Oklahoma State	12–20	4–14	T–13th	
Oklahoma State:		119–109 (.522)	51–75 (.405)		
Michigan Wolverines (Big Ten Conference) (2026–present)
2026–27	Michigan	3–2	0–0		
Michigan:		3–2 (.600)	0–0 (–)		
Total:		122–111 (.524)			

== Personal life ==
Boynton is married to Jenny Boynton. They have one son and one daughter. Boynton also has three older sisters. Boynton is a Christian.
