= 2026–27 Purdue Boilermakers men's basketball team =

American college basketball season

2026–27 Purdue Boilermakers men's basketball
- Conference: Big Ten Conference
- Record: 3–2 (0–0 Big Ten)
- Head coach: Matt Painter (22nd season)
- Associate head coach: P.J. Thompson (2nd season)
- Assistant coaches: Brandon Brantley (14th season); Kenneth Lowe (1st season); Paul Lusk (6th season); Sasha Stefanovic (2nd season)
- Home arena: Mackey Arena

2026–27 Big Ten Conference men's basketball standings
	Conf.				Overall
Team	W		L	PCT	W		L	PCT
Indiana	0	–	0	–	6	–	0	1.000
Minnesota	0	–	0	–	6	–	0	1.000
No. 24 Nebraska	0	–	0	–	5	–	0	1.000
No. 7 UCLA	0	–	0	–	5	–	0	1.000
No. 18т USC	0	–	0	–	5	–	0	1.000
Washington	0	–	0	–	4	–	0	1.000
No. 10 Illinois	0	–	0	–	5	–	1	.833
Penn State	0	–	0	–	5	–	1	.833
No. 2 Michigan State	0	–	0	–	4	–	1	.800
No. 18т Michigan	0	–	0	–	3	–	1	.750
Oregon	0	–	0	–	3	–	1	.750
Ohio State	0	–	0	–	4	–	2	.667
Purdue	0	–	0	–	4	–	2	.667
Rutgers	0	–	0	–	4	–	2	.667
Wisconsin	0	–	0	–	4	–	2	.667
Iowa	0	–	0	–	3	–	2	.600
Maryland	0	–	0	–	3	–	2	.600
Northwestern	0	–	0	–	3	–	3	.500
† 2027 Big Ten tournament winner As of November 21, 2026; Rankings from AP poll

The 2026–27 Purdue Boilermakers men's basketball team represents Purdue University in the 2026–27 NCAA Division I men's basketball season. Their head coach is Matt Painter, who is in his 22nd season with the Boilermakers. The Boilermakers play their home games at Mackey Arena in West Lafayette, Indiana as members of the Big Ten Conference.

== Previous season ==
The Boilermakers entered the 2025–26 season ranked No. 1 both polls. Prior to the conference season, they won the Bahamas Championship, defeating Texas Tech in the final. The Boilermakers finished the season 30–9, 13–7 in Big Ten play to finish in a tie for sixth place. They defeated Northwestern, Nebraska, and UCLA to advance the Big Ten tournament championship. There they defeated Michigan to earn the conference's automatic bid to the NCAA tournament. As the No. 2 seed in the West region, they defeated Queens and Miami to advance to the Sweet Sixteen for the third straight year. They defeated Texas to advance the Elite Eight before losing to Arizona.

== Offseason ==
=== Coaching changes ===
On April 14, 2026, Purdue assistant coach Terry Johnson announced he was stepping down from his position as assistant coach, citing a desire to "pursue other professional opportunities". Johnson had been an assistant coach for 5 years, starting in the 2021–22 season. He is being replaced by former Purdue player Kenneth Lowe, who played for Purdue from 1999 to 2004 and was a two-time Big Ten Defensive Player of the Year. Lowe previously spent time on the coaching staff of St. Thomas (Minnesota) and Miami (Ohio). Additionally, P.J. Thompson was promoted to associate head coach.

=== Departures ===
Purdue departures
Name	Number	Pos.	Height	Weight	Year	Hometown	Reason for departure
Fletcher Loyer	2	G	6'5"	180	Sr	Fort Wayne, IN	Graduated. Declared for the 2026 NBA draft; signed with the Los Angeles Clippers as undrafted free agent.
Braden Smith	3	G	6'0"	170	Sr	Westfield, IN	Graduated. Declared for the 2026 NBA draft; selected 38th overall by the Chicago Bulls (traded to Indiana Pacers).
Trey Kaufman-Renn	4	F	6'9"	240	Sr	Sellersburg, IN	Declared for the 2026 NBA draft; selected 59th overall by the Minnesota Timberwolves. Transferred to Kansas
Liam Murphy	5	F	6'8"	225	Sr	Staten Island, NY	Graduated
Aaron Fine	6	G	6'2"	190	Fr	Noblesville, IN	Transferred to Ball State
Oscar Cluff	45	C	6'11"	255	Sr	Sunshine Coast, Australia	Graduated. Declared for the 2026 NBA draft; signed with the Houston Rockets as undrafted free agent.

=== Incoming transfers ===
On February 13, 2026, former Princeton forward Caden Pierce committed to play for Purdue over offers from UConn, Duke, Louisville, and Gonzaga. Pierce is a 6'7" forward, and averaged 11.9 points, 7.9 rebounds, and 2.5 assists per game across 3 seasons. He was named the 2023-24 Ivy League Player of the Year after averaging 16.6 points and 9.2 rebounds a game. He is the younger brother of Indianapolis Colts wide receiver Alec Pierce.

Purdue incoming transfers
Name	Number	Pos	Height	Weight	Year	Hometown	Previous school	Years remaining	Date eligible
Caden Pierce	8	F	6'7"	220	Rs-Sr	Glen Ellyn, IL	Princeton	1	October 1, 2026

=== Recruiting classes ===
==== 2026 recruiting class ====
College recruiting (2026)
Name	Hometown	School	Height	Weight	Commit date
Sinan Huan; C	Beijing, China	Georgetown Prep	7 ft 0 in (2.13 m)	225 lb (102 kg)	Nov 12, 2025
Sinan Huan; C	Recruit ratings: Rivals: 247Sports: On3: ESPN: (84)				
Luke Ertel; PG	Fortville, IN	Mount Vernon HS	6 ft 2 in (1.88 m)	170 lb (77 kg)	Aug 27, 2024
Luke Ertel; PG	Recruit ratings: Rivals: 247Sports: On3: ESPN: (87)				
Jacob Webber; SF	Kearney, NE	La Lumiere School	6 ft 6 in (1.98 m)	175 lb (79 kg)	Sep 2, 2025
Jacob Webber; SF	Recruit ratings: Rivals: 247Sports: On3: ESPN: (84)				
Rivers Knight; PF	Durham, NC	La Lumiere School	6 ft 8 in (2.03 m)	210 lb (95 kg)	Sep 28, 2025
Rivers Knight; PF	Recruit ratings: Rivals: 247Sports: On3: ESPN: (81)				
Jamyn Sondrup; C	Springville, UT	Springville HS	6 ft 9 in (2.06 m)	225 lb (102 kg)	March 19, 2026 (Note: Sondrup signed with Purdue in 2026 but is deferring to the Class of 2028 following a 2-year mission.)
Jamyn Sondrup; C	Recruit ratings: Rivals: 247Sports: On3: ESPN: (80)				
Overall recruit ranking: Rivals: 12 247Sports: 39 On3: 12 ESPN: 11
Note: In many cases, Scout, Rivals, 247Sports, On3, and ESPN may conflict in their listings of height and weight.; In these cases, the average was taken. ESPN grades are on a 100-point scale.; Sources: "Purdue 2026 Basketball Commitments". Rivals.; "2026 Purdue Boilermakers Recruiting Class". ESPN.; "2026 Team Ranking". Rivals.; "2026–27 Purdue Boilermakers men's basketball team". 247Sports.; "2026–27 Purdue Boilermakers men's basketball team". On3.

==== 2027 recruiting class ====
College recruiting (2027)
Name	Hometown	School	Height	Weight	Commit date
Isaiah Hill; C	Indianapolis, IN	Pike HS	7 ft 0 in (2.13 m)	205 lb (93 kg)	May 15, 2026
Isaiah Hill; C	Recruit ratings: 247Sports: On3: ESPN: (93)				
Kevin Savage; PG	Marietta, GA	Wheeler HS	5 ft 11 in (1.80 m)	160 lb (73 kg)	Jul 5, 2026
Kevin Savage; PG	Recruit ratings: 247Sports: On3: ESPN: (88)				
Overall recruit ranking: Rivals: 1 247Sports: 2 On3: 1
Note: In many cases, Scout, Rivals, 247Sports, On3, and ESPN may conflict in their listings of height and weight.; In these cases, the average was taken. ESPN grades are on a 100-point scale.; Sources: "Purdue 2027 Basketball Commitments". Rivals.; "2027 Purdue Boilermakers Recruiting Class". ESPN.; "2027 Team Ranking". Rivals.; "2026–27 Purdue Boilermakers men's basketball team". 247Sports.; "2026–27 Purdue Boilermakers men's basketball team". On3.

== Preseason ==
Going into the 2026–27 season, Purdue is losing over 60% of the 2025-26 scoring production. Andy Katz of NCAA.com ranked Purdue at #19 in his preseason Power 44 rankings.

== Roster ==
2026–27 Purdue Boilermakers men's basketball team
Players
Coaches

Pos.	#	Name	Height	Weight	Year	Previous school	Hometown
G	0	C. J. Cox	6 ft 3 in (1.91 m)	195 lb (88 kg)	Jr	Milton Academy	Lexington, MA
G	1	Antione West Jr.	6 ft 3 in (1.91 m)	195 lb (88 kg)	RS Fr	Whitmer HS	Toledo, OH
G	2	Luke Ertel	6 ft 2 in (1.88 m)	180 lb (82 kg)	Fr	Mount Vernon HS	Fortville, IN
F	7	Sam King (W)	6 ft 9 in (2.06 m)	230 lb (104 kg)	RS Sr	Columbus North HS	Columbus, IN
F	8	Caden Pierce	6 ft 7 in (2.01 m)	220 lb (100 kg)	RS Sr	Glenbard West HS/Princeton	Glen Ellyn, IL
G	9	Jack Lusk (W)	6 ft 4 in (1.93 m)	195 lb (88 kg)	Sr	Elkhorn North HS/Millikin	Elkhorn, NE
F	11	Jacob Webber	6 ft 6 in (1.98 m)	175 lb (79 kg)	Fr	La Lumiere School	Kearney, NE
C	12	Daniel Jacobsen	7 ft 4 in (2.24 m)	250 lb (113 kg)	Jr	Brewster Academy	Chicago, IL
G	14	Jack Benter	6 ft 6 in (1.98 m)	215 lb (98 kg)	RS So	Brownstown Central HS	Brownstown, IN
G	17	Omer Mayer	6 ft 4 in (1.93 m)	215 lb (98 kg)	So	Maccabi Tel Aviv B.C.	Tel Aviv, Israel
F	18	Enzo Shahrvin	6 ft 8 in (2.03 m)	230 lb (104 kg)	Sr	Paris Basketball	Évry, France
F	21	Rivers Knight	6 ft 8 in (2.03 m)	210 lb (95 kg)	Fr	La Lumiere School	Durham, NC
G	24	Gicarri Harris	6 ft 3 in (1.91 m)	210 lb (95 kg)	Jr	Grayson HS	Atlanta, GA
G	32	Jace Rayl (W)	5 ft 11 in (1.8 m)	175 lb (79 kg)	Sr	Kokomo HS	Kokomo, IN
C	33	Sinan Huan	7 ft 0 in (2.13 m)	225 lb (102 kg)	Fr	Georgetown Prep	Beijing, China
F	34	Raleigh Burgess	6 ft 11 in (2.11 m)	245 lb (111 kg)	RS So	Sycamore HS	Cincinnati, OH

Head coach

- Matt Painter (Purdue)

Assistant coach(es)

- Brandon Brantley (Purdue)
- Paul Lusk (Southern Illinois)
- Kenneth Lowe (Purdue)
- P.J. Thompson (Purdue)
- Sasha Stefanovic (Purdue)

Legend

- (C) Team captain
- (S) Suspended
- (I) Ineligible
- (W) Walk-on
- Injured
- Current redshirt

Roster
Last update: July 24, 2026

== Schedule and results ==
Date time, TV	Rank^{#}	Opponent^{#}	Result	Record	High points	High rebounds	High assists	Site (attendance) city, state
Summer International Trip
July 25, 2026*; 8:00 pm, YouTube		at Vancouver Selects	W 102–63	–	20 – Tied	–	–	Langara College; Vancouver, BC
July 26, 2026*; 7:00 pm, Canada West TV		at Trinity Western	W 82–66	–	14 – Jacobsen	7 – Pierce	9 – Mayer	Langley Events Centre; Langley, BC
July 28, 2026*; 9:00 pm, CanadaSports		vs. Calgary	W 79–48	–	14 – West Jr.	9 – Pierce	4 – Mayer	West Gymnasium; Burnaby, BC
July 29, 2026*; 5:00 pm, CanadaSports		vs. UFV	W 97–62	–	21 – Webber	7 – Ertel	7 – Ertel	Centre for Sport & Wellness; North Vancouver, BC
Exhibition
October 18, 2026*; 2:00 p.m., B1G+		Ball State	W 87–55	–	16 – Harris	6 – Tied	5 – Harris	Mackey Arena (14,876); West Lafayette, IN
October 22, 2026*; 7:00 p.m., B1G+		at Purdue Fort Wayne	W 92–62	–	16 – Mayer	10 – Benter	4 – Tied	War Memorial Coliseum (10,141); Fort Wayne, IN
October 27, 2026*; 7:00 p.m., WFSB (local)		at No. 4 UConn	L 53–76	–	18 – Cox	7 – Tied	3 – Harris	PeoplesBank Arena (15,495); Hartford, CT
Regular season
November 2, 2026*; 7:30 p.m., TNT/TruTV		vs. No. 15 Gonzaga; Naismith Hall of Fame Series	L 72–78	0–1	22 – Jacobsen	7 – Jacobsen	5 – Mayer	T-Mobile Arena; Las Vegas, NV
November 6, 2026*; 6:30 p.m., BTN		Valparaiso	L 80–83 ^{2OT}	0–2	28 – Jacobsen	12 – Cox	5 – Mayer	Mackey Arena (14,876); West Lafayette, IN
November 9, 2026*; 8:30 p.m., FS1		Illinois State	W 76–59	1–2	20 – Jacobsen	7 – Jacobsen	3 – Tied	Mackey Arena (14,876); West Lafayette, IN
November 13, 2026*; 7:00 p.m., B1G+		Ohio	W 80–62	2–2	23 – Harris	8 – Tied	4 – Tied	Mackey Arena (14,876); West Lafayette, IN
November 17, 2026*; 6:30 p.m., BTN		Lipscomb	W 95–78	3–2	27 – West	12 – Jacobsen	7 – Jacobsen	Mackey Arena (14,876); West Lafayette, IN
November 20, 2026*; 7:00 p.m., BTN		Oakland	W 95-49	4–2	24 – Ertel	9 – Jacobsen	7 – Benter	Mackey Arena (14,876); West Lafayette, IN
November 24, 2026*; 6:00 p.m., FS1		vs. DePaul; Fort Myers Tip-Off – Beach Division						Suncoast Credit Union Arena; Fort Myers, FL
November 26, 2026*; 12:00 p.m., FOX		vs. Oklahoma; Fort Myers Tip-Off – Beach Division						Suncoast Credit Union Arena; Fort Myers, FL
December 1, 2026; 7:00 p.m., NBCSN/Peacock		Iowa						Mackey Arena; West Lafayette, IN
December 5, 2026*; 8:00 p.m., ESPN		at Iowa State						Hilton Coliseum; Ames, IA
December 8, 2026; 9:00 p.m., NBCSN/Peacock		at Wisconsin						Kohl Center; Madison, WI
December 11, 2026*; 8:00 p.m., FOX		Tennessee						Mackey Arena; West Lafayette, IN
December 19, 2026*; 5:30 p.m., FS1		vs. Colorado; Indy Classic						Gainbridge Fieldhouse; Indianapolis, IN
December 21, 2026*; 6:00 p.m., BTN		California Baptist						Mackey Arena; West Lafayette, IN
December 30, 2026; 6:00 p.m., BTN		USC						Mackey Arena; West Lafayette, IN
January 2, 2027; 12:00 p.m., BTN		Rutgers						Mackey Arena; West Lafayette, IN
January 5, 2027; 9:00 p.m., NBCSN/Peacock		at Illinois						State Farm Center; Champaign, IL
January 8, 2027; 8:00 p.m., FOX		at Michigan						Crisler Center; Ann Arbor, MI
January 12, 2027; 8:00 p.m., NBCSN/Peacock		Ohio State						Mackey Arena; West Lafayette, IN
January 17, 2027; 2:00 p.m., BTN		at Minnesota						Williams Arena; Minneapolis, MN
January 20, 2027; 6:30 p.m., BTN		at Penn State						Bryce Jordan Center; College Township, PA
January 23, 2027; 12:00 p.m., FS1		Maryland						Mackey Arena; West Lafayette, IN
January 26, 2027; 6:00 p.m., NBCSN/Peacock		Nebraska						Mackey Arena; West Lafayette, IN
January 30, 2027; 3:00 p.m./8:00 p.m., FOX		at Michigan State						Breslin Student Events Center; East Lansing, MI
February 3, 2027; 6:30 p.m., BTN		at Rutgers						Jersey Mike's Arena; Piscataway, NJ
February 6, 2027; 12:00 p.m., FS1		Northwestern						Mackey Arena; West Lafayette, IN
February 12, 2027; 8:00 p.m., FOX		Illinois						Mackey Arena; West Lafayette, IN
February 16, 2027; 7:00 p.m., NBCSN/Peacock		at Indiana; Rivalry / Indiana National Guard Governor's Cup						Simon Skjodt Assembly Hall; Bloomington, IN
February 21, 2027; 1:00 p.m., CBS		UCLA						Mackey Arena; West Lafayette, IN
February 24, 2027; 10:30 p.m., BTN		at Oregon						Matthew Knight Arena; Eugene, OR
February 27, 2027; 8:30 p.m., BTN		at Washington						Alaska Airlines Arena; Seattle, WA
March 5, 2027; 8:00 p.m., FOX		Indiana; Rivalry / Indiana National Guard Governor's Cup						Mackey Arena; West Lafayette, IN
Big Ten tournament
		vs.						Gainbridge Fieldhouse; Indianapolis, IN
*Non-conference game. ^{#}Rankings from AP poll. (#) Tournament seedings in parentheses. All times are in Eastern Time.

== Rankings ==
Ranking movements Legend: ██ Increase in ranking ██ Decrease in ranking — = Not ranked RV = Received votes
	Week																				
Poll	Pre	1	2	3	4	5	6	7	8	9	10	11	12	13	14	15	16	17	18	19	Final
AP	RV	—	—																		
Coaches	24	RV	—																		
