= 12th Indiana Infantry Regiment =

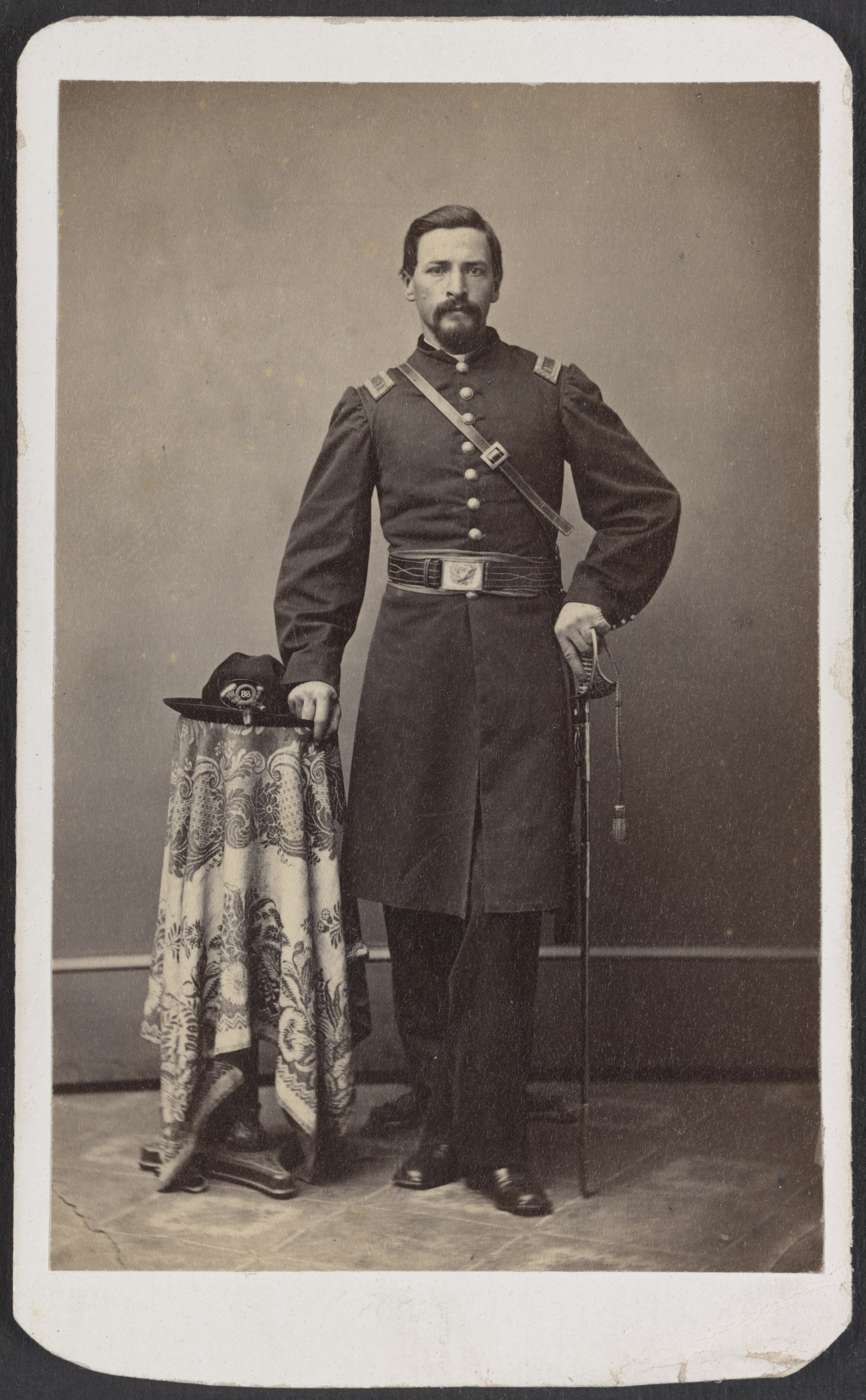
- Captain Ferdinand F. Boltz of Company S of the 12th Indiana Infantry Regiment, and Co. F, 88th Indiana Infantry Regiment
- Active: May 27, 1862 – June 1865
- Country: United States
- Allegiance: Union
- Branch: Infantry
- Engagements: Battle of Richmond; Siege of Vicksburg; Siege of Jackson; Chattanooga campaign; Battle of Missionary Ridge; Atlanta campaign; Battle of Resaca; Battle of Dallas; Battle of New Hope Church; Battle of Allatoona; Battle of Kennesaw Mountain; Battle of Atlanta; Siege of Atlanta; Battle of Jonesborough; Sherman's March to the Sea; Carolinas campaign Battle of Bentonville

The 12th Indiana Infantry Regiment was an infantry regiment in the Union Army during the American Civil War.

== Organization ==
The regiment was organized in Indianapolis from May 27 to August 27, 1862, and was mustered into federal service on August 17, 1862. The original organization of the regiment was as follows:

Original Organization of Regiment.
Company	Earliest Moniker	Primary Place of Recruitment	Earliest Captain
A	The Bloodhounds	Vernon and Warsaw	James Harrison Goodnow
B	The Fortville Rifles	Fortville, Fort Wayne, and Albion	Elbert D. Baldwin
C	The Copperheads	Marion	David P. Cubberly
D	Noblesville Guards	Noblesville and Monticello	George Bowman
E	Kosciusko Guards	Warsaw and Kosciusko County	Samuel F. Rooker
F	The Alerts	Warsaw	Reuben Williams
G	Mad Anthony Guards	Fortville and Alfont	James Huston
H	Vernon Light Guards	Vernon and Columbus	George May Trotter
I	Vernon Light Guards	Warsaw	Samuel W. Wells
K	Vernon Light Guards	Fort Wayne	George Nelson

== Service ==
The 12th Indiana Infantry was organized at Indianapolis, Indiana May 27 through August 27, 1862, and mustered in on August 17, 1862, for three year's service under the command of Colonel William H. Link.

The regiment was attached to Cruft's Brigade, Army of Kentucky, August 30. Attached to 2nd Brigade, District of Memphis, Tennessee, XIII Corps, to December 1862. 1st Brigade, 1st Division, District of Memphis, XIII Corps, December 1862. 1st Brigade, 1st Division, XVII Corps, Army of the Tennessee, to January 1863. 1st Brigade, 1st Division, XVI Corps, to July 1863. 1st Brigade, 4th Division, XV Corps, to September 1864. 1st Brigade, 1st Division, XV Corps, to June 1865.

The 12th Indiana Infantry mustered out of service after June 24, 1865. Veterans and recruits were transferred to the 48th Indiana Infantry and 59th Indiana Infantry.

== Detailed service ==
- Left Indiana for Kentucky August 21.
- Battle of Richmond, Kentucky, August 30. Regiment mostly captured.
- Paroled and sent to Indianapolis, for reorganization.
- Action at Lexington, Kentucky, September 2 (detachment).
- Regiment left Indianapolis, for Memphis, Tennessee, November 23, 1862.
- Grant's Central Mississippi Campaign November–December 1862.
- Action at Holly Springs, Mississippi, December 20, 1862.
- Duty at Grand Junction and Colliersville, Tennessee, guarding Memphis and Charleston Railroad until June 1863.
- Ordered to Vicksburg, Mississippi, June 9.
- Siege of Vicksburg June 12-July 4.
- Advance on Jackson, Mississippi, July 4–10.
- Siege of Jackson July 10–17.
- Duty at Big Black until September 28.
- Moved to Memphis, Tennessee, then marched to Chattanooga, Tennessee, September 28-November 20.
- Operations on the Memphis and Charleston Railroad in Alabama October 20–29.
- Chattanooga campaign November 23–27.
- Tunnel Hill November 23–25.
- Battle of Missionary Ridge November 25.
- March to relief of Knoxville, Tennessee, November 28-December 8.
- Duty at Scottsboro, Alabama, until May 1864.
- Atlanta campaign May 1-September 8.
- Demonstrations on Resaca May 8–13. Near Resaca May 13.
- Battle of Resaca May 14–15.
- Movements on Dallas May 18–25.
- Battles about Dallas, New Hope Church, and Allatoona Hills May 25-June 5.
- Operations about Marietta and against Kennesaw Mountain June 10-July 2.
- Brush Mountain June 15.
- Assault on Kennesaw June 27.
- Nickajack Creek July 2–5.
- Chattahoochee River July 5–17.
- Battle of Atlanta July 22.
- Siege of Atlanta July 22-August 25.
- Battle of Ezra Chapel, Hood's 2nd sortie, July 28.
- Flank movement on Jonesborough August 25–30.
- Battle of Jonesborough August 31-September 1.
- Battle of Lovejoy's Station September 2–6.
- Operations against Hood in northern Georgia and northern Alabama September 29-November 3.
- Sherman's March to the Sea November 15-December 10.
- Siege of Savannah December 10–21.
- Campaign of the Carolinas January to April 1865.
- Reconnaissance to Salkehatchie River, South Carolina, January 25.
- Battle of Rivers' Bridge February 2–5.
- South Edisto River February 9.
- North Edisto River February 12–13.
- Congaree Creek February 15.
- Columbia February 16–17.
- Battle of Bentonville, March 20–21.
- Occupation of Goldsboro March 24.
- Advance on Raleigh April 10–14.
- Occupation of Raleigh April 14.
- Bennett's House April 26.
- Surrender of Johnston and his army. March to Washington, D.C., via Richmond, Virginia, April 29-May 20.
- Grand Review of the Armies June 24, 1865.

== Casualties ==
The regiment lost a total of 295 men; 8 officers and 92 enlisted men killed or mortally wounded, 2 officers and 193 enlisted men due to disease.

== Commanders ==
- Colonel William H. Link - mortally wounded at the Battle of Richmond; died September 20, 1862
- Colonel Reuben Williams

== See also ==
- List of Indiana Civil War regiments
- Indiana in the Civil War

== Notes/References/Sources ==
Notes

Sources

- Dyer, Frederick Henry (1908). A Compendium of the War of the Rebellion (PDF). Des Moines, IA: Dyer Pub. Co. p. 1122. ASIN B01BUFJ76Q. This article incorporates text from this source, which is in the public domain.
- Federal Publishing Company (1908). Military Affairs and Regimental Histories of New Jersey, Indiana, Illinois and Michigan (PDF). The Union Army: A History of Military Affairs in the Loyal States, 1861–65 – Records of the Regiments in the Union army – Cyclopedia of battles – Memoirs of Commanders and Soldiers. Vol. III. Madison, WI: Federal Publishing Company. pp. 115–116. OCLC 694018100. This article incorporates text from this source, which is in the public domain.
- Gage, Moses D. (1865). From Vicksburg to Raleigh or, A Complete History of the Twelfth Regiment Indiana Volunteer Infantry, and the Campaigns of Grant and Sherman, with an Outline of the Great Rebellion (pdf) (1st ed.). Chicago, IL: Clarke & Co. p. 368. OCLC 276859037. This article incorporates text from this source, which is in the public domain.
- Hemphill, William S. (1993) [1904]. Priser, Marjorie (ed.). Journal of the Kosciusko Guards, Company E, 12th Regiment, Indiana Volunteers, written by William S. Hemphill. Warsaw, IN: Kosciusko County Historical Society. p. 141. OCLC 866696727.
- Terrell, William Henry Harrison (1865). Report of the Adjutant General of the State of Indiana (pdf). Indiana Adjutant General Reports. Vol. II. Indianapolis, IN: A.H. Connor State Printer. pp. 86–99. OCLC 558004259. This article incorporates text from this source, which is in the public domain.
- Williams, Reub (2004) [c.1903]. General Reub Williams's Memories of Civil War Times: Personal Reminiscences of Happenings that Took Place from 1861 to the Grand Review (pdf). Westminster, MD: Heritage Books. p. 318. ISBN 978-0-7884-2517-2. OCLC 61858269.
- "Indiana Battle Flag Inventory". Indiana War Memorial. May 4, 2021. This article incorporates text from this source, which is in the public domain.
