= Tanner Koziol =

American football player (born 2004)

No. 88 – Jacksonville Jaguars
- Position: Tight end
- Roster status: Active

Personal information
- Born: January 28, 2004 (age 22); Bloomingdale, Illinois, U.S.
- Listed height: 6 ft 7 in (2.01 m)
- Listed weight: 250 lb (113 kg)

Career information
- High school: Mount Vernon (Fortville, Indiana)
- College: Ball State (2022–2024); Houston (2025)
- NFL draft: 2026: 5th round, 164th overall pick

Career history
- Jacksonville Jaguars (2026–present)

Awards and highlights
- First-team All-Big 12 (2025); Second-team All-MAC (2024); Third-team All-MAC (2023)

Career NFL statistics as of Week 8, 2026
- Receptions: 1
- Receiving yards: 8
- Stats at Pro Football Reference

Tanner Koziol (born January 28, 2004) is an American professional football tight end for the Jacksonville Jaguars of the National Football League (NFL). He played college football for the Ball State Cardinals and the Houston Cougars and was selected by the Jaguars in the fifth round of the 2026 NFL draft.

== Early life ==
Koziol attended Mount Vernon High School in Fortville, Indiana. He was rated as a three-star recruit. Initially, Koziol committed to play college football for the North Dakota Fighting Hawks. However, he later flipped his commitment to play for the Ball State Cardinals.

== College career ==
=== Ball State ===
As a freshman in 2022, Koziol hauled in 35 receptions for 373 yards and seven touchdowns, earning freshman all-American honors. In 2023, he hauled in 34 passes for 295 yards and three touchdowns for the Cardinals, earning third-team all-Mid-American Conference (MAC) honors. After the season, Koziol entered the NCAA transfer portal and transferred to play for the Louisville Cardinals before de-committing and returning to Ball State. During the 2024 season, he notched 94 receptions for 839 yards and eight touchdowns and was named second-team all-MAC. After the season, Koziol entered his name into the NCAA transfer portal.

=== Wisconsin ===
Koziol transferred to play for the Wisconsin Badgers.

Koziol transferred away from Wisconsin after 15 practices.

=== Houston ===
On April 17, 2025, Koziol announced that he would transfer to Houston.

In Houston's season opener against Stephen F. Austin on August 28, 2025, he recorded seven receptions for 63 yards and a touchdown before briefly exiting in the third quarter with a left leg injury, though he returned to the game. He was later cleared to play in the following game against Rice.

In 2025, Koziol recorded 74 receptions for 727 yards and six touchdowns in his only season with Houston. He served as one of Houston's primary receiving targets during the season and recorded at least five receptions in 10 of 13 games played. He was ranked No. 86 on ESPN's Top 100 players of the 2025 college football season. Against Arizona State, he had seven receptions for 100 yards and a touchdown. In the 2025 Texas Bowl, he finished with nine receptions for 76 yards and one touchdown.

In addition, he was named an All-American by Pro Football and Sports Network (PFSN) and was a semifinalist for the John Mackey Award.

=== Statistics ===
Year	Team	Games		Receiving			
Year	Team	GP	GS	Rec	Yds	Avg	TD
2022	Ball State	12	5	35	373	10.7	7
2023	Ball State	12	9	34	295	8.7	3
2024	Ball State	12	8	94	839	8.9	8
2025	Houston	13	13	74	727	9.8	6
Career		49	35	237	2,234	9.4	24

== Professional career ==
Pre-draft measurables
Height	Weight	Arm length	Hand span	Wingspan	40-yard dash	10-yard split	20-yard split	20-yard shuttle	Three-cone drill	Vertical jump	Broad jump
6 ft 6 1/2 in (1.99 m)	247 lb (112 kg)	33 3/4 in (0.86 m)	9 3/4 in (0.25 m)	6 ft 8 3/4 in (2.05 m)	4.70 s	1.62 s	2.71 s	4.43 s	7.08 s	36.5 in (0.93 m)	10 ft 2 in (3.10 m)
All values from NFL Combine/Pro Day

Koziol was selected by the Jacksonville Jaguars in the fifth round with the 164th overall pick of the 2026 NFL Draft. He was the first Houston tight end selected in the NFL draft since 2010 and the ninth tight end in program history to be drafted.
