= Ingalls, Indiana =

- Town
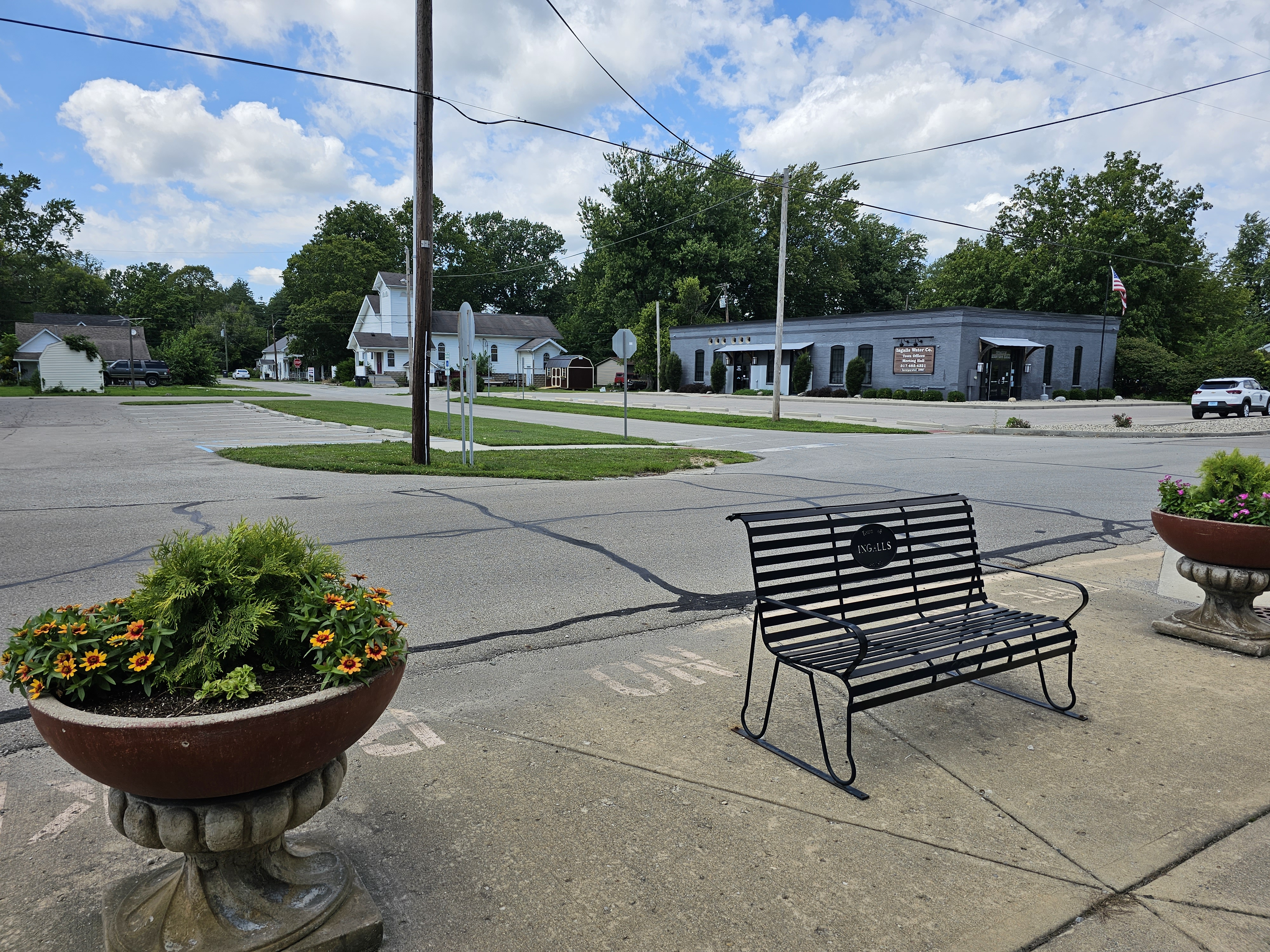
- The town hall of Ingalls, Indiana

- Seal

- Location in Madison County, Indiana
- Coordinates: 39°59′05″N 85°49′30″W
- Country: United States
- State: Indiana
- County: Madison
- Township: Green

Area
  - Total: 3.04 sq mi (7.88 km^{2})
  - Land: 3.01 sq mi (7.79 km^{2})
  - Water: 0.039 sq mi (0.10 km^{2})
- Elevation: 863 ft (263 m)

Population (2020)
  - Total: 2,223
  - Estimate (2025): 2,791 ▲
  - Density: 739.4/sq mi (285.49/km^{2})
- Time zone: UTC-5 (EST)
  - Summer (DST): UTC-5 (EST)
- ZIP code: 46048
- Area code: 317
- FIPS code: 18-36342
- GNIS feature ID: 2397007
- Website: www.ingalls.in.gov

Ingalls is a town in Green Township, Madison County, Indiana, United States. It is part of the Indianapolis–Carmel–Anderson metropolitan statistical area. The population was 2,223 at the 2020 census.

== History ==
Ingalls was platted in 1893. It was named in honor of Melville E. Ingalls, a railroad official.

== Geography ==
Ingalls is located in the southwest corner of Madison County. It is bordered to the north by the towns of Pendleton and Lapel, to the west by the cities of Noblesville and Fishers in Hamilton County, and to the south by the town of Fortville in Hancock County.

U.S. Route 36 runs through the center of Ingalls as Broadway Street, leading northeast 4 miles (6 km) to the center of Pendleton and southwest 3 miles (5 km) to the center of Fortville. Interstate 69 runs through a northwestern extension of the town limits, leading northeast 12 miles (19 km) to Anderson, the Madison county seat, and southwest 26 miles (42 km) to Indianapolis.

According to the U.S. Census Bureau, Ingalls has a total area of 3.04 square miles (7.87 km^{2}), of which 0.04 square miles (0.10 km^{2}), or 1.25%, are water. Fall Creek crosses the town north of its center, flowing southwest to join the White River in downtown Indianapolis.

== Demographics ==
Historical population
Census	Pop.	Note	%±
1900	542		—
1910	322		−40.6%
1920	399		23.9%
1930	430		7.8%
1940	442		2.8%
1950	666		50.7%
1960	873		31.1%
1970	888		1.7%
1980	909		2.4%
1990	889		−2.2%
2000	1,168		31.4%
2010	2,394		105.0%
2020	2,223		−7.1%
2025 (est.)	2,791	▲	25.6%
U.S. Decennial Census

=== 2020 census ===
As of the 2020 census, Ingalls had a population of 2,223. The median age was 33.1 years. 28.4% of residents were under the age of 18 and 10.0% of residents were 65 years of age or older. For every 100 females there were 101.0 males, and for every 100 females age 18 and over there were 99.4 males age 18 and over.

90.0% of residents lived in urban areas, while 10.0% lived in rural areas.

There were 811 households in Ingalls, of which 41.8% had children under the age of 18 living in them. Of all households, 48.3% were married-couple households, 20.2% were households with a male householder and no spouse or partner present, and 21.8% were households with a female householder and no spouse or partner present. About 22.0% of all households were made up of individuals and 7.2% had someone living alone who was 65 years of age or older.

There were 847 housing units, of which 4.3% were vacant. The homeowner vacancy rate was 1.4% and the rental vacancy rate was 5.6%.

Racial composition as of the 2020 census
Race	Number	Percent
White	1,958	88.1%
Black or African American	65	2.9%
American Indian and Alaska Native	11	0.5%
Asian	6	0.3%
Native Hawaiian and Other Pacific Islander	1	0.0%
Some other race	28	1.3%
Two or more races	154	6.9%
Hispanic or Latino (of any race)	101	4.5%

=== 2010 census ===
As of the census of 2010, there were 2,394 people, 834 households, and 649 families living in the town. The population density was 1,585.4 inhabitants per square mile (612.1/km^{2}). There were 907 housing units at an average density of 600.7 per square mile (231.9/km^{2}). The racial makeup of the town was 92.4% White, 3.0% African American, 0.4% Native American, 0.3% Asian, 1.4% from other races, and 2.3% from two or more races. Hispanic or Latino of any race were 3.9% of the population.

There were 834 households, of which 51.6% had children under the age of 18 living with them; 53.8% were married couples living together; 15.3% had a female householder with no husband present; 8.6% had a male householder with no wife present; and 22.2% were non-families. 16.7% of all households were made up of individuals, and 4.8% had someone living alone who was 65 years of age or older. The average household size was 2.87 and the average family size was 3.15.

The median age in the town was 29.8 years. 32.9% of residents were under the age of 18; 7.1% were between the ages of 18 and 24; 36.3% were from 25 to 44; 16.3% were from 45 to 64; and 7.6% were 65 years of age or older. The gender makeup of the town was 49.5% male and 50.5% female.

=== 2000 census ===
As of the census of 2000, there were 1,168 people, 422 households, and 335 families living in the town. The population density was 1,703.7 inhabitants per square mile (657.8/km^{2}). There were 452 housing units at an average density of 659.3 per square mile (254.6/km^{2}). The racial makeup of the town was 97.86% White, 0.34% African American, 0.09% Native American, 0.09% Asian, and 1.63% from two or more races. Hispanic or Latino of any race were 1.03% of the population.

There were 422 households, out of which 39.8% had children under the age of 18 living with them, 65.2% were married couples living together, 10.2% had a female householder with no husband present, and 20.6% were non-families. 17.3% of all households were made up of individuals, and 8.3% had someone living alone who was 65 years of age or older. The average household size was 2.77 and the average family size was 3.10.

In the town, the population was spread out, with 29.5% under the age of 18, 8.0% from 18 to 24, 32.0% from 25 to 44, 20.0% from 45 to 64, and 10.5% who were 65 years of age or older. The median age was 34 years. For every 100 females, there were 101.7 males. For every 100 females age 18 and over, there were 95.3 males.

The median income for a household in the town was $43,456, and the median income for a family was $50,577. Males had a median income of $35,526 versus $25,700 for females. The per capita income for the town was $16,988. About 3.7% of families and 5.4% of the population were below the poverty line, including 3.7% of those under age 18 and 6.7% of those age 65 or over.

== Education ==
It is in the South Madison Community School Corporation.
