= Lapel, Indiana =

- Town
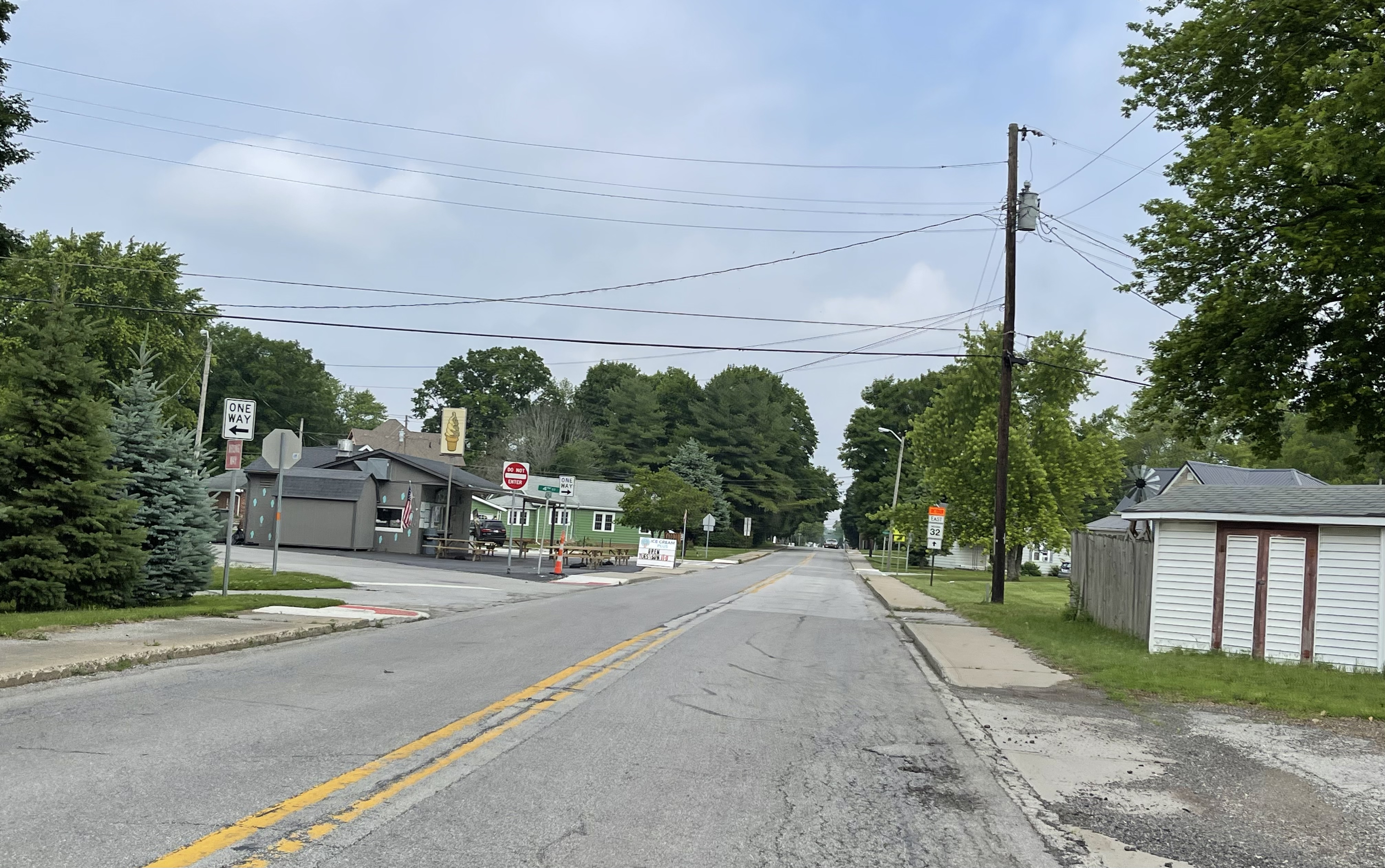
- Lapel in 2022

- Seal

- Location in Madison County, Indiana
- Coordinates: 40°02′00″N 85°50′26″W
- Country: United States
- State: Indiana
- County: Madison
- Townships: Stony Creek, Green

Area
  - Total: 10.37 sq mi (26.85 km^{2})
  - Land: 10.37 sq mi (26.85 km^{2})
  - Water: 0 sq mi (0.00 km^{2})
- Elevation: 856 ft (261 m)

Population (2020)
  - Total: 2,325
  - Estimate (2025): 2,422 ▲
  - Density: 224.2/sq mi (86.58/km^{2})
- Time zone: UTC-5 (Eastern (EST))
  - Summer (DST): UTC-4 (EDT)
- ZIP code: 46051
- Area code: 765
- FIPS code: 18-42228
- GNIS feature ID: 2396708
- Website: www.lapelindiana.org

Lapel is a town in Stony Creek and Green townships, Madison County, Indiana, United States. It is part of the Indianapolis–Carmel–Anderson metropolitan statistical area. The population was 2,325 at the 2020 census, up from 2,068 in 2010.

== History ==
Lapel was platted in 1876 by David Conrad and Samuel Busby when the railroad was extended to that point. The name "Lapel" was chosen because the railroad caused the town to be in the shape of a man's coat lapel.

== Geography ==
Lapel is located in southwestern Madison County. It is bordered to the south by the town of Ingalls, to the southeast by the town of Pendleton, and to the north by unincorporated Fishersburg.

Indiana State Road 13 passes through the center of Lapel as Pendleton Avenue, leading south 9 miles (14 km) to Fortville and north 15 miles (24 km) to Elwood. State Road 32 runs along the northern border of the town, leading east-northeast 9 miles (14 km) to Anderson, the county seat, and west-southwest the same distance to Noblesville. State Road 132 leads southeast from Lapel 7 miles (11 km) to the center of Pendleton.

According to the U.S. Census Bureau, Lapel has a total area of 10.37 square miles (26.9 km^{2}), all land. Stony Creek passes just north of the town limits, leading southwest to the White River in Noblesville, while Mud Creek rises as several small headwaters in the undeveloped southern part of the town, flowing southwest to Fall Creek in Lawrence.

== Demographics ==
Historical population
Census	Pop.	Note	%±
1900	869		—
1910	1,045		20.3%
1920	1,079		3.3%
1930	1,140		5.7%
1940	1,146		0.5%
1950	1,389		21.2%
1960	1,772		27.6%
1970	1,796		1.4%
1980	1,881		4.7%
1990	1,742		−7.4%
2000	1,855		6.5%
2010	2,068		11.5%
2020	2,325		12.4%
2025 (est.)	2,422	▲	4.2%
U.S. Decennial Census

=== 2020 census ===
As of the 2020 census, Lapel had a population of 2,325. The median age was 39.2 years. 24.9% of residents were under the age of 18 and 15.4% of residents were 65 years of age or older. For every 100 females there were 95.7 males, and for every 100 females age 18 and over there were 91.8 males age 18 and over.

0.0% of residents lived in urban areas, while 100.0% lived in rural areas.

There were 931 households in Lapel, of which 34.8% had children under the age of 18 living in them. Of all households, 48.9% were married-couple households, 17.9% were households with a male householder and no spouse or partner present, and 25.6% were households with a female householder and no spouse or partner present. About 27.3% of all households were made up of individuals and 10.1% had someone living alone who was 65 years of age or older.

There were 990 housing units, of which 6.0% were vacant. The homeowner vacancy rate was 0.6% and the rental vacancy rate was 5.3%.

Racial composition as of the 2020 census
Race	Number	Percent
White	2,193	94.3%
Black or African American	13	0.6%
American Indian and Alaska Native	10	0.4%
Asian	9	0.4%
Native Hawaiian and Other Pacific Islander	0	0.0%
Some other race	4	0.2%
Two or more races	96	4.1%
Hispanic or Latino (of any race)	27	1.2%

=== 2010 census ===
As of the census of 2010, there were 2,068 people, 803 households, and 578 families living in the town. The population density was 1,498.6 inhabitants per square mile (578.6/km^{2}). There were 850 housing units at an average density of 615.9 per square mile (237.8/km^{2}). The racial makeup of the town was 97.7% White, 0.2% African American, 0.3% Native American, 0.2% Asian, 0.3% from other races, and 1.3% from two or more races. Hispanic or Latino of any race were 0.8% of the population.

There were 803 households, of which 38.9% had children under the age of 18 living with them, 53.3% were married couples living together, 13.8% had a female householder with no husband present, 4.9% had a male householder with no wife present, and 28.0% were non-families. 23.3% of all households were made up of individuals, and 10.3% had someone living alone who was 65 years of age or older. The average household size was 2.58 and the average family size was 2.99.

The median age in the town was 37.3 years. 27.9% of residents were under the age of 18; 7.5% were between the ages of 18 and 24; 26.2% were from 25 to 44; 25.9% were from 45 to 64; and 12.4% were 65 years of age or older. The gender makeup of the town was 48.3% male and 51.7% female.

=== 2000 census ===
As of the census of 2000, there were 1,855 people, 749 households, and 534 families living in the town. The population density was 2,421.5 inhabitants per square mile (934.9/km^{2}). There were 788 housing units at an average density of 1,028.6 per square mile (397.1/km^{2}). The racial makeup of the town was 98.87% White, 0.05% African American, 0.27% Native American, 0.05% Asian, 0.05% Pacific Islander, 0.16% from other races, and 0.54% from two or more races. Hispanic or Latino of any race were 0.43% of the population.

There were 749 households, out of which 34.6% had children under the age of 18 living with them, 55.3% were married couples living together, 12.8% had a female householder with no husband present, and 28.6% were non-families. 26.0% of all households were made up of individuals, and 11.9% had someone living alone who was 65 years of age or older. The average household size was 2.48 and the average family size was 2.96.

In the town, the population was spread out, with 27.5% under the age of 18, 7.9% from 18 to 24, 30.9% from 25 to 44, 21.1% from 45 to 64, and 12.6% who were 65 years of age or older. The median age was 35 years. For every 100 females, there were 94.2 males. For every 100 females age 18 and over, there were 86.7 males.

The median income for a household in the town was $41,389, and the median income for a family was $48,083. Males had a median income of $38,854 versus $24,727 for females. The per capita income for the town was $18,887. About 4.8% of families and 5.7% of the population were below the poverty line, including 7.7% of those under age 18 and none of those age 65 or over.

== Education ==
The northern portion is in the Frankton-Lapel Community Schools school district. The southern part is in the South Madison Community School Corporation.

Lapel contains an elementary school, a junior high school and a high school. A new high school building was finished in December 2007. These schools are a part of the Frankton-Lapel School Corporation.

Lapel has a public library, a branch of the Anderson Public Library.
