= 2025–26 Purdue Boilermakers men's basketball team =

American college basketball season

2025–26 Purdue Boilermakers men's basketball

Big Ten tournament champions Bahamas Championship champions

NCAA tournament, Elite Eight
- Conference: Big Ten Conference

Ranking
- Coaches: No. 7
- AP: No. 6
- Record: 30–9 (13–7 Big Ten)
- Head coach: Matt Painter (21st season)
- Assistant coaches: Brandon Brantley (13th season); Terry Johnson (5th season); Paul Lusk (5th season); P.J. Thompson (1st season); Sasha Stefanovic (1st season)
- Home arena: Mackey Arena

2025–26 Big Ten Conference men's basketball standings
	Conf.				Overall
Team	W		L	PCT	W		L	PCT
No. 1 Michigan	19	–	1	.950	37	–	3	.925
No. 14 Nebraska	15	–	5	.750	28	–	7	.800
No. 5 Illinois	15	–	5	.750	28	–	9	.757
No. 11 Michigan State	15	–	5	.750	27	–	8	.771
No. 25 Wisconsin	14	–	6	.700	24	–	11	.686
No. 6 Purdue †	13	–	7	.650	30	–	9	.769
UCLA	13	–	7	.650	24	–	12	.667
Ohio State	12	–	8	.600	21	–	13	.618
No. 15 Iowa	10	–	10	.500	24	–	13	.649
Indiana	9	–	11	.450	18	–	14	.563
Minnesota	8	–	12	.400	15	–	18	.455
USC	7	–	13	.350	18	–	14	.563
Washington	7	–	13	.350	16	–	17	.485
Rutgers	6	–	14	.300	14	–	20	.412
Northwestern	5	–	15	.250	15	–	19	.441
Oregon	5	–	15	.250	12	–	20	.375
Maryland	4	–	16	.200	12	–	21	.364
Penn State	3	–	17	.150	12	–	20	.375
† 2026 Big Ten tournament winner Rankings from AP poll

The 2025–26 Purdue Boilermakers men's basketball team represented Purdue University in the 2025–26 NCAA Division I men's basketball season. Their head coach was Matt Painter, who is in his 21st season with the Boilermakers. The Boilermakers played their home games at Mackey Arena in West Lafayette, Indiana as members of the Big Ten Conference.

The Boilermakers were ranked No. 1 in the preseason AP and coaches polls, the first time the school had begun the season ranked in the top spot. Prior to the regular season, they won the Bahamas Championship, defeating Texas Tech in the final. The Boilermakers finished the regular season 23–8 (13–7 in the Big Ten). They then won the Big Ten Championship, defeating Michigan in the final. As champions, they received an automatic bid to the NCAA tournament as the No. 2 seed in the West region. There they defeated Queens in the first round and Miami in the second round to make the Sweet 16 for the third year in a row. They then defeated Texas to make the Elite 8, where they lost to Arizona.

== Previous season ==
Purdue finished the 2024–25 season 24–12, 13–7 in Big Ten play to finish in a three-way tie for fourth place. As the No. 6 seed In the Big Ten tournament, they defeated USC in the second round before losing to Michigan in the quarterfinals. They received an at–large bid to the NCAA tournament as the No. 4 seed in the Midwest region. There they defeated High Point in the first round and McNeese in the second round to reach the Sweet Sixteen for the eighth time in 16 seasons under Matt Painter. In the Sweet Sixteen, they lost to eventual national runner–up Houston.

== Offseason ==
=== Departures ===
Purdue departures
Name	Number	Pos.	Height	Weight	Year	Hometown	Reason for departure
Caleb Furst	1	F	6'10"	230	Senior	Fort Wayne, IN	Graduated
Myles Colvin	5	G	6'5"	205	Sophomore	Indianapolis, IN	Transferred to Wake Forest
Brian Waddell	11	F	6'7"	195	RS Junior	Carmel, IN	Transferred to Bellarmine
Josh Furst	20	F	6'6"	200	Sophomore	Fort Wayne, IN	Walk-on; left team
Camden Heide	23	F	6'7"	205	RS Sophomore	Wayzata, MN	Transferred to Texas
Will Berg	44	C	7'2"	260	RS Sophomore	Stockholm, Sweden	Transferred to Wichita State

=== Incoming transfers ===
Purdue incoming transfers
Name	Number	Pos.	Height	Weight	Year	Hometown	Previous school
Liam Murphy	5	F	6'7"	225	Senior	Staten Island, NY	North Florida
Oscar Cluff	45	C	6'11"	260	Senior	Sunshine Coast, Queensland	South Dakota State

=== Recruiting classes ===
==== 2025 recruiting class ====
College recruiting
Name	Hometown	School	Height	Weight	Commit date
Antione West Jr. G	Toledo, OH	Whitmer HS	6 ft 3 in (1.91 m)	180 lb (82 kg)	Nov 13, 2024
Antione West Jr. G	Recruit ratings: Rivals: 247Sports: On3: ESPN: (82)				
Omer Mayer; G	Tel Aviv, Israel	Maccabi Tel Aviv B.C.	6 ft 4 in (1.93 m)	215 lb (98 kg)	Apr 16, 2025
Omer Mayer; G	Recruit ratings: Rivals: 247Sports: On3:				
Overall recruit ranking: 247Sports: 55 On3: 106
Note: In many cases, Scout, Rivals, 247Sports, On3, and ESPN may conflict in their listings of height and weight.; In these cases, the average was taken. ESPN grades are on a 100-point scale.; Sources: "Purdue 2025 Basketball Commitments". Rivals.; "2025 Purdue Boilermakers Recruiting Class". ESPN.; "2025 Team Ranking". Rivals.; "2025–26 Purdue Boilermakers men's basketball team". 247Sports.; "2025–26 Purdue Boilermakers men's basketball team". On3.

==== 2026 recruiting class ====
College recruiting
Name	Hometown	School	Height	Weight	Commit date
Sinan Huan; C	Beijing, China	Georgetown Prep	7 ft 0 in (2.13 m)	225 lb (102 kg)	Nov 12, 2025
Sinan Huan; C	Recruit ratings: Rivals: 247Sports: On3: ESPN: (82)				
Luke Ertel; PG	Fortville, IN	Mount Vernon (Fortville)	6 ft 2 in (1.88 m)	170 lb (77 kg)	Aug 27, 2024
Luke Ertel; PG	Recruit ratings: Rivals: 247Sports: On3: ESPN: (84)				
Jacob Webber; SF	Kearney, NE	La Lumiere School	6 ft 6 in (1.98 m)	175 lb (79 kg)	Sep 2, 2025
Jacob Webber; SF	Recruit ratings: Rivals: 247Sports: On3: ESPN: (82)				
Rivers Knight; PF	Durham, NC	La Lumiere School	6 ft 8 in (2.03 m)	210 lb (95 kg)	Sep 28, 2025
Rivers Knight; PF	Recruit ratings: Rivals: 247Sports: On3: ESPN: (78)				
Overall recruit ranking: Rivals: 16 247Sports: 4
Note: In many cases, Scout, Rivals, 247Sports, On3, and ESPN may conflict in their listings of height and weight.; In these cases, the average was taken. ESPN grades are on a 100-point scale.; Sources: "Purdue 2026 Basketball Commitments". Rivals.; "2026 Purdue Boilermakers Recruiting Class". ESPN.; "2026 Team Ranking". Rivals.; "2025–26 Purdue Boilermakers men's basketball team". 247Sports.; "2025–26 Purdue Boilermakers men's basketball team". On3.

== Preseason ==
=== Preseason Big Ten poll ===
Purdue was picked to win the conference in a preseason poll of basketball writers. Braden Smith was chosen as the conference's preseason player of the year for the second consecutive year. Trey Kaufman-Renn was also named to the All-Big Ten Preseason team.

=== Preseason All-American ===
Braden Smith was named a unanimous AP preseason All-American and the preseason player of the year by many different polls.

== Roster ==
2025–26 Purdue Boilermakers men's basketball team
Players
Coaches

Pos.	#	Name	Height	Weight	Year	Previous school	Hometown
G	0	C.J. Cox	6 ft 3 in (1.91 m)	200 lb (91 kg)	So	Milton Academy	Lexington, MA
G	1	Antione West Jr. (redshirt)	6 ft 3 in (1.91 m)	180 lb (82 kg)	Fr	Whitmer HS	Toledo, OH
G	2	Fletcher Loyer	6 ft 5 in (1.96 m)	180 lb (82 kg)	Sr	Homestead HS	Fort Wayne, IN
G	3	Braden Smith	6 ft 0 in (1.83 m)	170 lb (77 kg)	Sr	Westfield HS	Westfield, IN
F	4	Trey Kaufman-Renn	6 ft 9 in (2.06 m)	230 lb (104 kg)	Sr	Silver Creek HS	Sellersburg, IN
F	5	Liam Murphy	6 ft 7 in (2.01 m)	225 lb (102 kg)	Sr	St. Peter's Boys HS	Staten Island, NY
G	6	Aaron Fine	6 ft 2 in (1.88 m)	190 lb (86 kg)	RS Fr	Noblesville HS	Noblesville, IN
F	7	Sam King (redshirt)	6 ft 9 in (2.06 m)	230 lb (104 kg)	Sr	Columbus North HS	Columbus, IN
G	9	Jack Lusk	6 ft 4 in (1.93 m)	195 lb (88 kg)	Jr	Elkhorn North HS	Elkhorn, NE
C	12	Daniel Jacobsen	7 ft 4 in (2.24 m)	230 lb (104 kg)	So	Brewster Academy	Chicago, IL
G	14	Jack Benter	6 ft 5 in (1.96 m)	210 lb (95 kg)	RS Fr	Brownstown Central HS	Brownstown, IN
G	17	Omer Mayer	6 ft 4 in (1.93 m)	215 lb (98 kg)	Fr	Maccabi Tel Aviv B.C.	Tel Aviv, Israel
G	24	Gicarri Harris	6 ft 3 in (1.91 m)	200 lb (91 kg)	So	Grayson HS	Atlanta, GA
G	32	Jace Rayl	5 ft 11 in (1.8 m)	175 lb (79 kg)	Jr	Kokomo HS	Kokomo, IN
F	34	Raleigh Burgess (redshirt)	6 ft 11 in (2.11 m)	240 lb (109 kg)	So	Sycamore HS	Cincinnati, OH
C	45	Oscar Cluff	6 ft 11 in (2.11 m)	260 lb (118 kg)	Sr	Kawana Waters	Sunshine Coast, AUS

Head coach

- Matt Painter (Purdue)

Assistant coach(es)

- Brandon Brantley (Purdue)
- Terry Johnson (Purdue Fort Wayne)
- Paul Lusk (Southern Illinois)
- P.J. Thompson (Purdue)
- Sasha Stefanovic (Purdue)

Legend

- (C) Team captain
- (S) Suspended
- (I) Ineligible
- (W) Walk-on
- Injured
- Current redshirt

Roster
Last update: May 8, 2025

== Schedule and results ==
Date time, TV	Rank^{#}	Opponent^{#}	Result	Record	High points	High rebounds	High assists	Site (attendance) city, state
Exhibition
October 24, 2025*; 6:00 p.m., SECN	No. 1	at No. 9 Kentucky	L 65–78	−	19 – Kaufman-Renn	5 – Tied	5 – Smith	Rupp Arena (19,906); Lexington, KY
October 29, 2025*; 7:00 p.m., B1G+	No. 1	Indianapolis	W 92–46	–	20 – Harris	8 – Jacobsen	7 – Smith	Mackey Arena (14,876); West Lafayette, IN
Regular season
November 4, 2025*; 6:30 p.m., BTN	No. 1	Evansville	W 82–51	1–0	30 – Loyer	10 – Cluff	11 – Smith	Mackey Arena (14,876); West Lafayette, IN
November 7, 2025*; 7:00 p.m., Peacock	No. 1	Oakland	W 87–77	2–0	20 – Smith	9 – Cluff	9 – Smith	Mackey Arena (14,876); West Lafayette, IN
November 13, 2025*; 7:00 p.m., ESPN2	No. 2	at No. 8 Alabama	W 87–80	3–0	29 – Smith	15 – Kaufman-Renn	5 – Kaufman-Renn	Coleman Coliseum (13,474); Tuscaloosa, AL
November 16, 2025*; 7:30 p.m., BTN	No. 2	Akron	W 97–79	4–0	17 – Kaufman-Renn	15 – Kaufman-Renn	10 – Smith	Mackey Arena (14,876); West Lafayette, IN
November 20, 2025*; 6:00 p.m., CBSSN	No. 1	vs. Memphis; Bahamas Championship semifinals	W 80–71	5–0	20 – Loyer	11 – Kaufman-Renn	11 – Smith	Baha Mar Convention Center; Nassau, The Bahamas
November 21, 2025*; 9:30 p.m., CBSSN	No. 1	vs. No. 15 Texas Tech; Bahamas Championship Game	W 86–56	6–0	15 – Cluff	15 – Cluff	7 – Smith	Baha Mar Convention Center; Nassau, The Bahamas
November 28, 2025*; 12:00 p.m., BTN	No. 1	Eastern Illinois	W 109–62	7–0	24 – Jacobsen	9 – Jacobsen	10 – Smith	Mackey Arena (14,876); West Lafayette, IN
December 2, 2025; 8:00 p.m., FS1	No. 1	at Rutgers	W 81–65	8−0 (1−0)	19 – Kaufman-Renn	13 – Kaufman-Renn	8 – Smith	Jersey Mike's Arena (8,000); Piscataway, NJ
December 6, 2025*; 12:00 p.m., CBS	No. 1	No. 10 Iowa State	L 58–81	8–1	11 – Smith	9 – Kaufman-Renn	8 – Smith	Mackey Arena (14,876); West Lafayette, IN
December 10, 2025; 7:00 p.m., BTN	No. 6	Minnesota	W 85–57	9–1 (2–0)	15 – Smith	11 – Cluff	12 – Smith	Mackey Arena (14,876); West Lafayette, IN
December 13, 2025*; 2:00 p.m., Peacock/NBCSN	No. 6	Marquette	W 79–59	10–1	22 – Cluff	11 – Cluff	10 – Smith	Mackey Arena (14,876); West Lafayette, IN
December 20, 2025*; 6:30 p.m., Peacock/NBCSN	No. 6	vs. No. 21 Auburn; Indy Classic	W 88–60	11–1	18 – Kaufman-Renn	7 – Cluff	14 – Smith	Gainbridge Fieldhouse (16,912); Indianapolis, IN
December 29, 2025*; 7:00 p.m., B1G+	No. 5	Kent State	W 101–60	12–1	20 – Benter	12 – Kaufman-Renn	8 – Smith	Mackey Arena (14,876); West Lafayette, IN
January 3, 2026; 8:00 p.m., FOX	No. 5	at Wisconsin	W 89–73	13–1 (3–0)	20 – Loyer	11 – Cluff	12 – Smith	Kohl Center (15,421); Madison, WI
January 7, 2026; 8:30 p.m., BTN	No. 5	Washington	W 81–73	14–1 (4–0)	23 – Smith	14 – Kaufman-Renn	6 – Smith	Mackey Arena (14,876); West Lafayette, IN
January 10, 2026; 2:00 p.m., BTN	No. 5	Penn State	W 93–85	15–1 (5–0)	26 – Smith	9 – Kaufman-Renn	14 – Smith	Mackey Arena (14,876); West Lafayette, IN
January 14, 2026; 6:30 p.m., BTN	No. 5	Iowa	W 79–72	16–1 (6–0)	16 – Smith	9 – Jacobsen	8 – Smith	Mackey Arena (14,876); West Lafayette, IN
January 17, 2026; 6:00 p.m., Peacock/NBCSN	No. 5	at USC	W 69–64	17–1 (7–0)	22 – Smith	7 – Benter	5 – Smith	Galen Center (8,629); Los Angeles, CA
January 20, 2026; 10:00 p.m., Peacock/NBCSN	No. 4	at UCLA	L 67–69	17–2 (7–1)	16 – Cox	7 – Kaufman-Renn	5 – Kaufman-Renn	Pauley Pavilion (10,235); Los Angeles, CA
January 24, 2026; 3:00 p.m., FOX	No. 4	No. 11 Illinois	L 82–88	17–3 (7–2)	27 – Smith	4 – Cluff	12 – Smith	Mackey Arena (14,876); West Lafayette, IN
January 27, 2026; 9:00 p.m., Peacock/NBCSN	No. 12	at Indiana; Rivalry	L 67–72	17–4 (7–3)	23 – Kaufman-Renn	6 – Tied	5 – Smith	Simon Skjodt Assembly Hall (17,222); Bloomington, IN
February 1, 2026; 1:00 p.m., CBS	No. 12	at Maryland	W 93–63	18–4 (8–3)	29 – Loyer	10 – Kaufman-Renn	6 – Smith	Xfinity Center (16,026); College Park, MD
February 7, 2026; 1:00 p.m., CBS	No. 12	Oregon	W 68–64	19–4 (9–3)	18 – Loyer	8 – Kaufman-Renn	4 – Tied	Mackey Arena (14,876); West Lafayette, IN
February 10, 2026; 7:00 p.m., FS1	No. 13	at No. 7 Nebraska	W 80–77 ^{OT}	20–4 (10–3)	18 – Loyer	19 – Kaufman-Renn	10 – Smith	Pinnacle Bank Arena (15,185); Lincoln, NE
February 14, 2026; 5:00 p.m., FOX	No. 13	at Iowa	W 78–57	21–4 (11–3)	14 – Tied	12 – Kaufman-Renn	12 – Smith	Carver–Hawkeye Arena (14,998); Iowa City, IA
February 17, 2026; 6:30 p.m., Peacock/NBCSN	No. 7	No. 1 Michigan	L 80–91	21–5 (11–4)	27 – Kaufman–Renn	12 – Kaufman–Renn	6 – Smith	Mackey Arena (14,876); West Lafayette, IN
February 20, 2026; 8:00 p.m., FOX	No. 7	Indiana; Rivalry	W 93–64	22–5 (12–4)	20 – Kaufman–Renn	8 – Cluff	8 – Smith	Mackey Arena (14,876); West Lafayette, IN
February 26, 2026; 8:00 p.m., Peacock/NBCSN	No. 8	No. 13 Michigan State	L 74–76	22–6 (12–5)	12 – Smith	6 – Kaufman–Renn	10 – Smith	Mackey Arena (14,876); West Lafayette, IN
March 1, 2026; 1:30 p.m., CBS	No. 8	at Ohio State	L 74–82	22–7 (12–6)	20 – Smith	9 – Kaufman–Renn	7 – Smith	Value City Arena (15,524); Columbus, OH
March 4, 2026; 8:30 p.m., BTN	No. 15	at Northwestern	W 70–66	23–7 (13–6)	27 – Cox	10 – Kaufman-Renn	9 – Smith	Welsh–Ryan Arena (7,039); Evanston, IL
March 7, 2026; 4:00 p.m., CBS	No. 15	Wisconsin	L 93–97	23–8 (13–7)	23 – Loyer	8 – Cluff	9 – Smith	Mackey Arena (14,876); West Lafayette, IN
Big Ten tournament
March 12, 2026; 6:30 p.m., BTN	(7) No. 18	vs. (15) Northwestern; Third round	W 81–68	24–8	19 – Tied	10 – Cluff	16 – Smith	United Center (16,861); Chicago, IL
March 13, 2026; 6:30 p.m., BTN	(7) No. 18	vs. (2) No. 11 Nebraska; Quarterfinal	W 74–58	25–8	19 – Loyer	9 – Tied	10 – Smith	United Center (18,988); Chicago, IL
March 14, 2026; 3:30 p.m., CBS	(7) No. 18	vs. (6) UCLA; Semifinal	W 73–66	26–8	17 – Cluff	14 – Cluff	9 – Smith	United Center (17,923); Chicago, IL
March 15, 2026; 3:30 p.m., CBS	(7) No. 18	vs. (1) No. 3 Michigan; Championship	W 80–72	27–8	21 – Cluff	5 – Tied	11 – Smith	United Center (16,807); Chicago, IL
NCAA tournament
March 20, 2026; 7:35 p.m., truTV	(2 W) No. 8	vs. (15 W) Queens; First round	W 104–71	28–8	26 – Smith	11 – Cluff	8 – Smith	Enterprise Center (17,726); St. Louis, MO
March 22, 2026; 12:10 p.m., CBS	(2 W) No. 8	vs. (7 W) No. 25 Miami (FL); Second round	W 79–69	29–8	24 – Loyer	9 – Kaufman-Renn	8 – Smith	Enterprise Center (16,348); St. Louis, MO
March 26, 2026; 7:10 p.m., CBS	(2 W) No. 8	vs. (11 W) Texas; Sweet Sixteen	W 79–77	30–8	20 – Kaufman-Renn	8 – Tied	5 – Smith	SAP Center (15,341); San Jose, CA
March 28, 2026; 8:49 p.m., TBS/TruTV	(2 W) No. 8	vs. (1 W) No. 2 Arizona; Elite Eight	L 64–79	30–9	14 – Cluff	10 – Cluff	7 – Smith	SAP Center (15,854); San Jose, CA
*Non-conference game. ^{#}Rankings from AP poll. (#) Tournament seedings in parentheses. W=West. All times are in Eastern Time.

== Rankings ==
Ranking movements Legend: ██ Increase in ranking ██ Decrease in ranking ( ) = First-place votes
	Week																				
Poll	Pre	1	2	3	4	5	6	7	8	9	10	11	12	13	14	15	16	17	18	19	Final
AP	1 (35)	2 (36)	1 (44)	1 (46)	1 (40)	6	6	5	5	5	5	4	12	12	13	7	8	15	18	8	6
Coaches	1 (18)	1 (21)	1 (20)	1 (23)	1 (21)	6	6	5	6	5	5	4	12	12	12	7	8	14	18	13	7
