= Hardscrabble, Indiana =

- Unincorporated community
- Location within Indiana Location within the United States
- Coordinates: 40°01′11″N 85°50′36″W
- Country: United States
- State: Indiana
- County: Madison
- Township: Green
- Elevation: 863 ft (263 m)
- ZIP code: 46051
- FIPS code: 18-31414
- GNIS feature ID: 435733

Hardscrabble was a small unincorporated community in Green Township, Madison County, Indiana. As of 1989 it had four houses, and its population was never greater than 16.

== Geography ==
Hardscrabble is located at the corner of Indiana State Roads 38 and 13, south of Lapel. Landmarks include a white farmhouse and the newly built Trinity Life Center.
