= Browne-Rafert House =

Historic house in Indiana, United States

- U.S. National Register of Historic Places
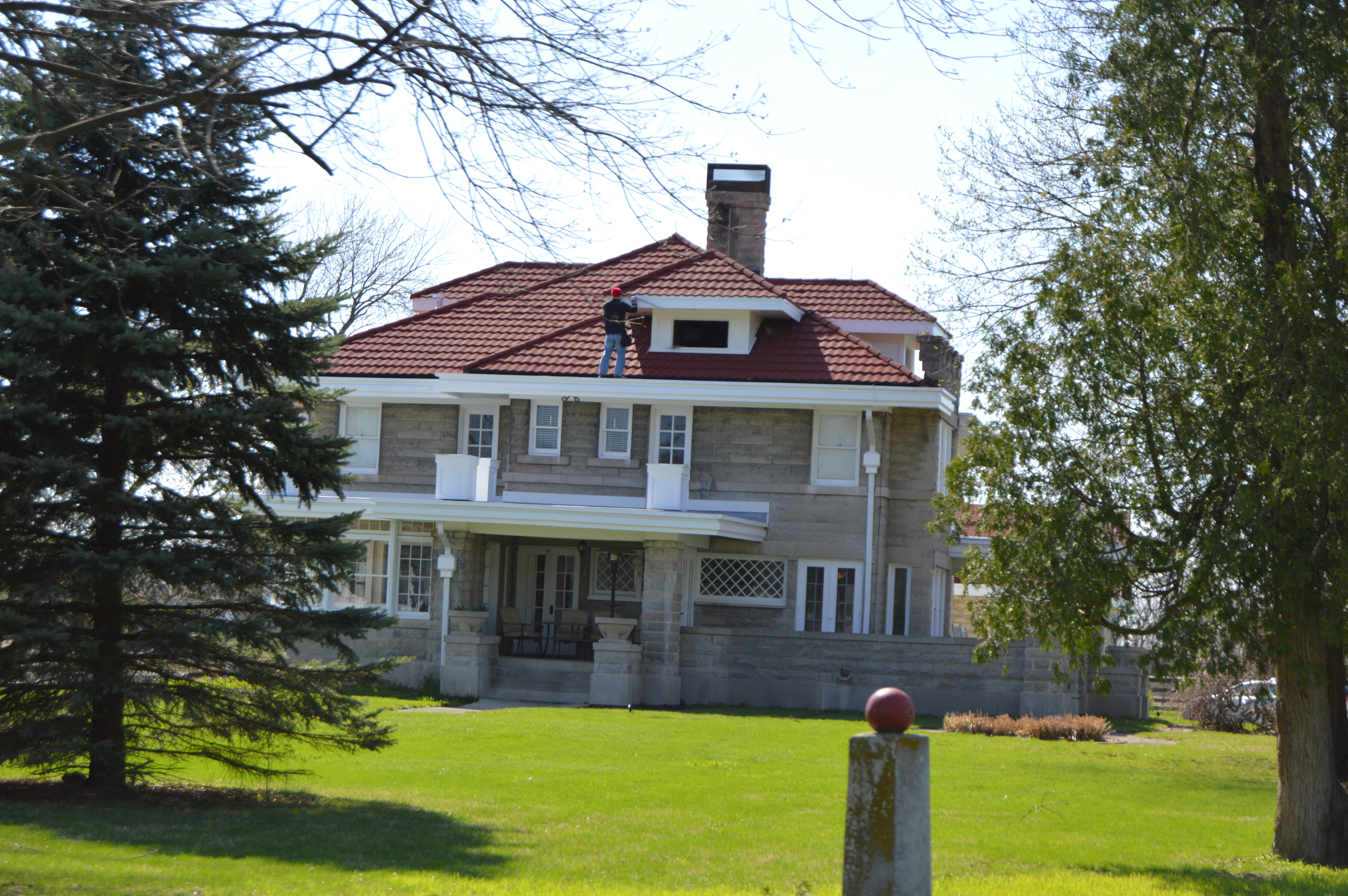
- Front of the house

- Location within Indiana Location within the United States
- Location: 534 N. Merrill St., Fortville, Indiana
- Coordinates: 39°56′21″N 85°51′15″W
- Area: 4.201 acres (1.700 ha)
- Built: 1914
- Architectural style: Late 19th and 20th Century American Movements
- NRHP reference No.: 15000595
- Added to NRHP: September 14, 2015

Browne-Rafert House, also known as the Rafert-Anderson House and Browne House, is a historic home located in Fortville, Indiana. It was built in 1914, and is a two-story, Arts and Crafts movement inspired dwelling constructed of Indiana limestone. It has a hipped roof with wide overhanging eaves. Also on the property are the contributing carriage house, small utility building originally used as an office, and perimeter fence, gate, and garden features.

It was listed on the National Register of Historic Places in 2015.
