= C. J. Cox =

American basketball player

No. 0 – Purdue Boilermakers
- Position: Point guard
- League: Big Ten Conference

Personal information
- Born: November 26, 2004 (age 21)
- Listed height: 6 ft 3 in (1.91 m)
- Listed weight: 205 lb (93 kg)

Career information
- High school: Lexington (Lexington, Massachusetts); Milton Academy (Milton, Massachusetts)
- College: Purdue (2024–present)

C. J. Cox (born November 26, 2004) is an American college basketball player for the Purdue Boilermakers of the Big Ten Conference.

== Early life and high school ==
Cox is from Lexington, Massachusetts. Coming out of high school, Cox committed to play college basketball for the Purdue Boilermakers.

== College career ==
On November 15, 2024, Cox recorded 11 points, while hitting three consecutive threes in an upset win over Alabama. On December 21, he tallied 16 points versus Auburn. On January 5, 2025, in his second career start, Cox totaled 12 points and eight rebounds in a victory versus Northwestern. On January 12, he scored a career-high 23 points in a victory against Nebraska. On January 24, Cox recorded 11 points and three steals in a victory over Michigan.

== Career statistics ==
Legend
GP	Games played	GS	Games started	MPG	Minutes per game
FG%	Field goal percentage	3P%	3-point field goal percentage	FT%	Free throw percentage
RPG	Rebounds per game	APG	Assists per game	SPG	Steals per game
BPG	Blocks per game	PPG	Points per game	**Bold**	Career high

=== College ===
Year	Team	GP	GS	MPG	FG%	3P%	FT%	RPG	APG	SPG	BPG	PPG
2024–25	Purdue	36	23	18.6	**.461**	**.398**	.782	2.8	0.7	**0.7**	0	6.0
2025–26	Purdue	**39**	**39**	**24.4**	.457	.373	**.842**	2.8	**1.3**	0.5	**.1**	**8.5**
Career		75	62	21.6	.459	.382	.806	2.8	1.0	0.6	.1	7.3
