= Stony Creek Township, Madison County, Indiana =

Stony Creek Township
- Township
- Location in Madison County
- Coordinates: 40°04′31″N 85°48′33″W
- Country: United States
- State: Indiana
- County: Madison

Government
  - Type: Indiana township

Area
  - Total: 28.28 sq mi (73.2 km^{2})
  - Land: 28.28 sq mi (73.2 km^{2})
  - Water: 0 sq mi (0 km^{2}) 0%
- Elevation: 869 ft (265 m)

Population (2020)
  - Total: 3,908
  - Density: 136.9/sq mi (52.9/km^{2})
- ZIP codes: 46011, 46051, 46064
- GNIS feature ID: 453879
- Website: stonycreektwp.com

Stony Creek Township is one of fourteen townships in Madison County, Indiana, United States. As of the 2010 census, its population was 3,871 and it contained 1,613 housing units.

It was named from a stream in the northwestern part.

== Geography ==
According to the 2010 census, the township has a total area of 28.28 square miles (73.2 km^{2}), all land.

=== Cities, towns, villages ===
- Lapel

=== Unincorporated towns ===
- Edgewood Village at 40.10143°N 85.753033°W
- Fishersburg at 40.071983°N 85.859425°W

(This list is based on USGS data and may include former settlements.)

=== Cemeteries ===
The township contains these two cemeteries: Brookside and Old Woodward.

=== Major highways ===
- Indiana State Road 32

== Education ==
- Frankton-Lapel Community Schools

Stony Creek Township residents may obtain a free library card from the Anderson Public Library in Anderson.

== Political districts ==
- Indiana's 5th congressional district
- State House District 37
- State Senate District 20
