= Fishersburg, Indiana =

- Census-designated place
- Location within Indiana Location within the United States
- Coordinates: 40°04′16″N 85°51′40″W
- Country: United States
- State: Indiana
- Counties: Madison, Hamilton
- Township: Stony Creek, Wayne
- Founded: 1837
- Founded by: Charles Fisher

Area
  - Total: 0.16 sq mi (0.41 km^{2})
  - Land: 0.16 sq mi (0.41 km^{2})
  - Water: 0.0 sq mi (0 km^{2})
- Elevation: 850 ft (260 m)
- Time zone: UTC-5 (Eastern (EST))
  - Summer (DST): UTC-4 (EDT)
- ZIP code: 46051 (Lapel)
- GNIS feature ID: 2830394

Fishersburg is an unincorporated community and census-designated place (CDP) in Stony Creek Township, Madison County, Indiana, United States.

A small portion of Fishersburg is located in Wayne Township, Hamilton County.

== History ==
Fishersburg was laid out in 1837. Charles Fisher started the first store.

A post office was established in Fishersburg in 1837 and was closed in 1904.

== Geography ==
Fishersburg is located in the center of the state, just west of the larger town of Lapel at the intersection of Indiana State Roads 32 and 13. It is bordered to the west by Hamilton County. Anderson, the Madison county seat, is 10 miles (16 km) to the east by SR 32, and Noblesville, the Hamilton county seat, is 8 miles (13 km) to the west.

According to the U.S. Census Bureau, the Fishersburg CDP has an area of 0.16 square miles (0.41 km^{2}), all land. Stony Creek, a west-flowing tributary of the White River, forms the southeast edge of the community, separating it from the town of Lapel.

== Demographics ==
The United States Census Bureau first delineated Fishersburg as a census designated place in the 2022 American Community Survey.
