= Green Township, Madison County, Indiana =

Green Township
- Township
- Location in Madison County
- Coordinates: 39°59′23″N 85°49′10″W
- Country: United States
- State: Indiana
- County: Madison

Government
  - Type: Indiana township

Area
  - Total: 24.13 sq mi (62.5 km^{2})
  - Land: 23.99 sq mi (62.1 km^{2})
  - Water: 0.14 sq mi (0.36 km^{2}) 0.58%
- Elevation: 869 ft (265 m)

Population (2020)
  - Total: 7,243
  - Density: 314.2/sq mi (121.3/km^{2})
- ZIP codes: 46040, 46048, 46051, 46064
- GNIS feature ID: 0453342

Green Township is one of fourteen townships in Madison County, Indiana, United States. As of the 2010 census, its population was 7,537 and it contained 2,758 housing units.

== History ==
Green Township was organized in 1826. It was named for Nathanael Greene.

== Geography ==
According to the 2010 census, the township has a total area of 24.13 square miles (62.5 km^{2}), of which 23.99 square miles (62.1 km^{2}) (or 99.42%) is land and 0.14 square miles (0.36 km^{2}) (or 0.58%) is water.

=== Cities, towns, villages ===
- Ingalls
- Pendleton (west edge)

=== Unincorporated towns ===
- Alfont at 39.95143°N 85.814701°W
- Hardscrabble at 40.019762°N 85.843313°W

=== Cemeteries ===
The township contains these eight cemeteries: Doty, Fausset, Gravel Lawn, Hiday, Jones, Mount Carmel, Nicholson and Pleasant Valley.

=== Major highways ===
- Interstate 69
- U.S. Route 36
- State Road 38
- State Road 67

== Education ==
- South Madison Community School Corporation

Green Township residents may obtain a free library card from the Pendleton Community Public Library in Pendleton.

== Political districts ==
- Indiana's 5th congressional district
- State House District 37
- State Senate District 25
