= Alfont, Indiana =

- Unincorporated community
- Location within Indiana Location within the United States
- Coordinates: 39°57′05″N 85°48′53″W
- Country: United States
- State: Indiana
- County: Madison
- Township: Green
- Elevation: 856 ft (261 m)
- ZIP code: 46040
- FIPS code: 18-00928
- GNIS feature ID: 430069

Alfont is an unincorporated community in Green Township, Madison County, Indiana.

== History ==
Alfont was laid out in about 1850. It was named for William Alfont, an early settler.

== Historical significance ==
One of the most tragic single accidents in Madison County occurred at Alfont, Indiana. The accident occurred February 2, 1924, at the southwest edge of Alfont.

Two interurban trains collided head-on with such force that the two motor cars, or front cars, telescoped into each other clear through to their smoking compartments. Nobody will ever know for certain how many people perished in the wreck and the fire which followed; however, the death toll was tentatively set at 21.

== Early history ==
The village of Alfont began in the 1830s when William Alfonte established a grist mill on Lick Creek in 1836. William Alfonte and his wife Elizabeth (Freeborn) Alfonte migrated from Philadelphia to Indiana. The grist mill burned in 1847 and was replaced shortly after with a saw mill near the same site. William Alfonte died in 1852. Three of his grandchildren became prominent military men: Brig. Gen. James R. Alfonte, Col. William R. Alfonte, and Col. Dallas Alfonte. Brig. Gen. James R. Alfonte received a Purple Heart and Legion of Merit. General James graduated from Pendleton High School, went to Purdue, and went on to a military career. He fought in both World War I and II. He was with the Quartermaster General's Department from 1942 until his retirement.

The town of Alfont (no one knows what happened to the final “e” in the name) had a post office at one time that was run by William Molden who also established a general store and warehouse. Alfont's growth slowed when Fortville grew and attracted much of the trade and the community's settlers. The town maintained prosperity until the 1890s when natural gas was discovered in Ingalls. The town of Ingalls was created in 1893.
