= Oscar Cluff =

Australian basketball player

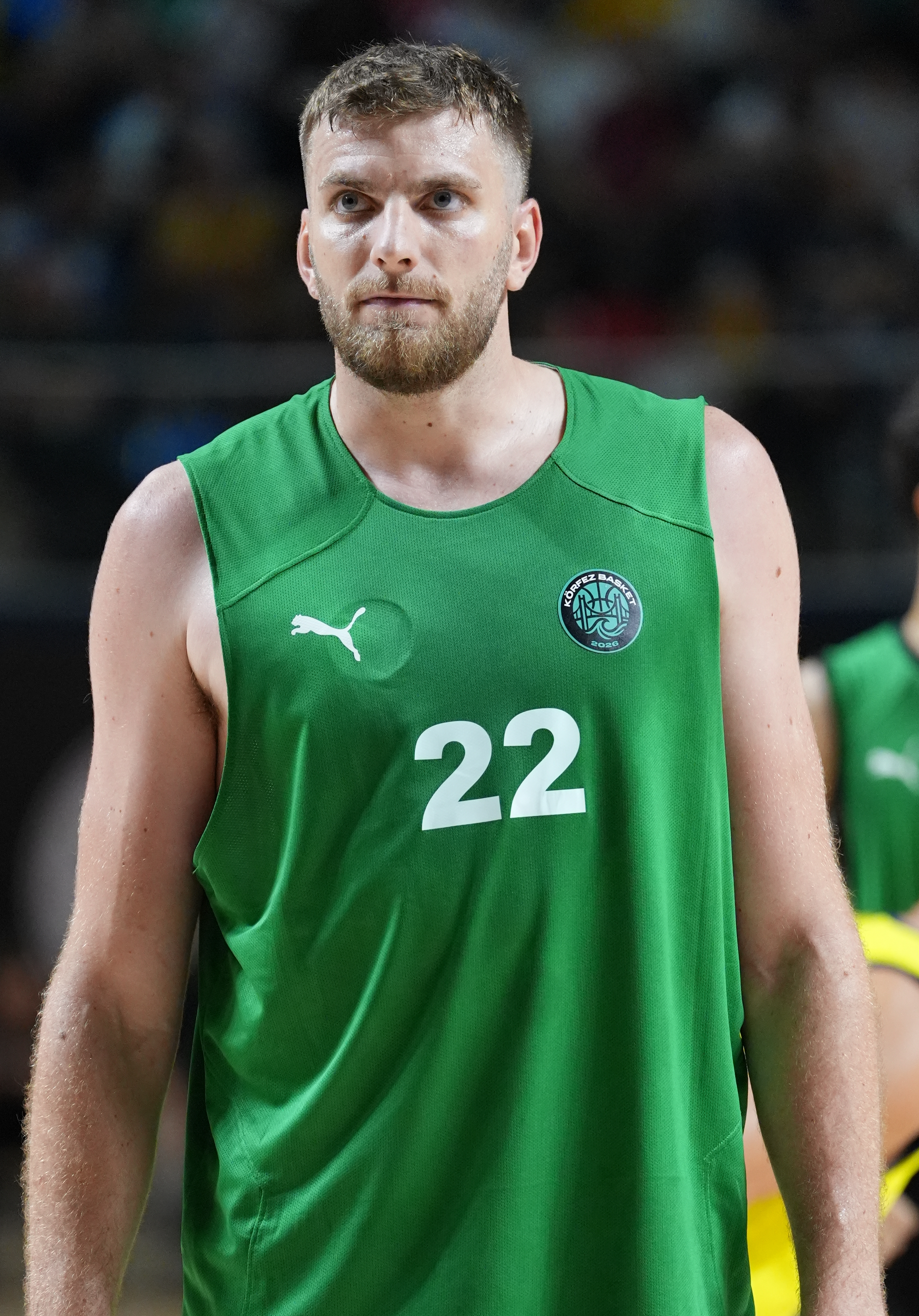

No. 22 – Biotekno Körfez Basket
- Position: Center
- League: Basketbol Süper Ligi

Personal information
- Born: 22 November 2001 (age 24)
- Listed height: 6 ft 11 in (2.11 m)
- Listed weight: 255 lb (116 kg)

Career information
- High school: Kawana Waters State College (Kawana Waters, Queensland)
- College: Cochise College (2021–2023); Washington State (2023–2024); South Dakota State (2024–2025); Purdue (2025–2026)
- NBA draft: 2026: undrafted
- Playing career: 2020–present

Career history
- 2020–2022; 2024: Sunshine Coast Phoenix
- 2026–present: Körfez Basket

Career highlights
- First-team All-Summit League (2025); Summit League Newcomer of the Year (2025); Summit League All-Defensive Team (2025)

Oscar Hogarth Cluff (born 22 November 2001) is an Australian professional basketball player for Körfez Basket of the Basketbol Süper Ligi (BSL). He played college basketball for the Cochise College Apaches, Washington State Cougars, South Dakota State Jackrabbits and Purdue Boilermakers.

== Early life ==
Cluff grew up on the Sunshine Coast of Queensland, Australia. He attended Kawana Waters State College.

== College career ==
Cluff began his college basketball career at Cochise College. After two years at Cochise, he transferred to Washington State. He averaged 7.0 points, 4.4 rebounds, and 1.2 assists per game in his only season with the Cougars. After the season and the departure of head coach Kyle Smith, Cluff entered the NCAA transfer portal.

Cluff transferred to South Dakota State. He averaged 17.6 points, 12.3 rebounds, and 2.8 assists per game and recorded 21 double-doubles in his only season with the Jackrabbits. Cluff was named Summit League Newcomer of the Year and first team all-conference at the end of the season. After the season, Cluff entered the transfer portal for a second time.

Cluff committed to play at Purdue on 4 April, 2025. He posted a season-high 23 points against Penn State in January but slumped through February. However, he was a top contributor in the Big Ten tournament, scoring 21 times in a win against future-national champions the Michigan Wolverines.

== Professional career ==
On August 5, 2026, he signed with Körfez Basket of the Basketbol Süper Ligi (BSL).

== Career statistics ==
Legend
GP	Games played	GS	Games started	MPG	Minutes per game
FG%	Field goal percentage	3P%	3-point field goal percentage	FT%	Free throw percentage
RPG	Rebounds per game	APG	Assists per game	SPG	Steals per game
BPG	Blocks per game	PPG	Points per game	**Bold**	Career high

=== College ===
Year	Team	GP	GS	MPG	FG%	3P%	FT%	RPG	APG	SPG	BPG	PPG
2021–22	Cochise College	31	31	23.6	.750	–	.652					12.0
2022–23	Cochise College	26	25		.748	.000	.647	9.8	2.3			18.2
2023–24	Washington State	35	23	20.3	.538	**1.000**	.660	4.4	1.2	**.5**	**.9**	7.0
2024–25	South Dakota State	30	30	**27.7**	.634	.667	**.778**	**12.3**	**2.8**	**.5**	.8	**17.6**
2025–26	Purdue	**39**	**39**	24.7	**.683**	–	.699	7.5	1.8	**.5**	**.9**	10.6
