= Luke Ertel =

American basketball player (born 2006)

No. 2 – Purdue Boilermakers
- Position: Point guard
- League: Big Ten Conference

Personal information
- Born: September 1, 2006 (age 20)
- Listed height: 6 ft 2 in (1.88 m)
- Listed weight: 180 lb (82 kg)

Career information
- High school: Mount Vernon (Fortville, Indiana)
- College: Purdue (2026–present)

Career highlights
- Indiana Mr. Basketball (2026)

Luke Ertel (born September 1, 2006) is an American college basketball player for the Purdue Boilermakers of the Big Ten Conference.

== Early life and high school ==
Luke grew up in Fortville, Indiana and played at Mount Vernon High School. He averaged 24.9 points, 9.9 rebounds, and 6.6 assists his senior season. Luke would soon lead Mount Vernon to a Class 4A state title against Crown Point High School. He had 26 points, 10 rebounds and 6 assists in that game. He would win Indiana Mr. Basketball later that year.

== College career ==
He committed to play college basketball at Purdue over offers from Wake Forest and Butler.

== Personal life ==
Luke is the son of Mike and Amy Ertel, and is the youngest of five. His brother, Michael, was a 2017 Indiana All-Star and played basketball at Louisiana-Monroe and UAB. His father Mike played college football at Butler.
