= Mount Vernon High School (Fortville, Indiana) =

Mt. Vernon High School

Location
- 8112 North 200 West; Fortville, Indiana 46040; United States; 39°54′6″N 85°50′39″W

Information
- Type: Public High School
- Established: 1969
- School district: Mt. Vernon Community School Corporation
- Principal: Brooke Tharp
- Teaching staff: 83.75
- Grades: 9–12
- Enrollment: 1,455 (2023–2024)
- Student to teacher ratio: 17.37
- Colors: Gold, black, and white
- Athletics conference: Hoosier Heritage Conference
- Nickname: Marauders
- Website: mvhs.mvcsc.k12.in.us

Mt. Vernon High School is a public high school located in Fortville, Indiana and is part of the Mt. Vernon Community School Corporation.

== Athletics ==
Mt. Vernon's athletic teams are known as the Marauders.

IHSAA State Championships
Sport	Year(s)
Boys Basketball (1)	2026 (4A)
Girls Basketball (1)	2013 (3A)
Football (1)	2022 (4A)
Softball (1)	2000 (2A)

== Demographics ==
The demographic breakdown of the 2,569 students enrolled for 2021–22 was:

- Male – 42.3%
- Female – 57.7%
- American Indian/Alaska Native – 0.1%
- Asian – 1.3%
- Black – 10.3%
- Hispanic – 5.4%
- White – 77.7%
- Multiracial – 5.2%

== Notable alumni ==
- Tanner Koziol, football tight end for the Jacksonville Jaguars
- Luke Ertel, college basketball player at Purdue University.

== See also ==
- List of high schools in Indiana
