= Fortville, Indiana =

- Town
- Town of Fortville
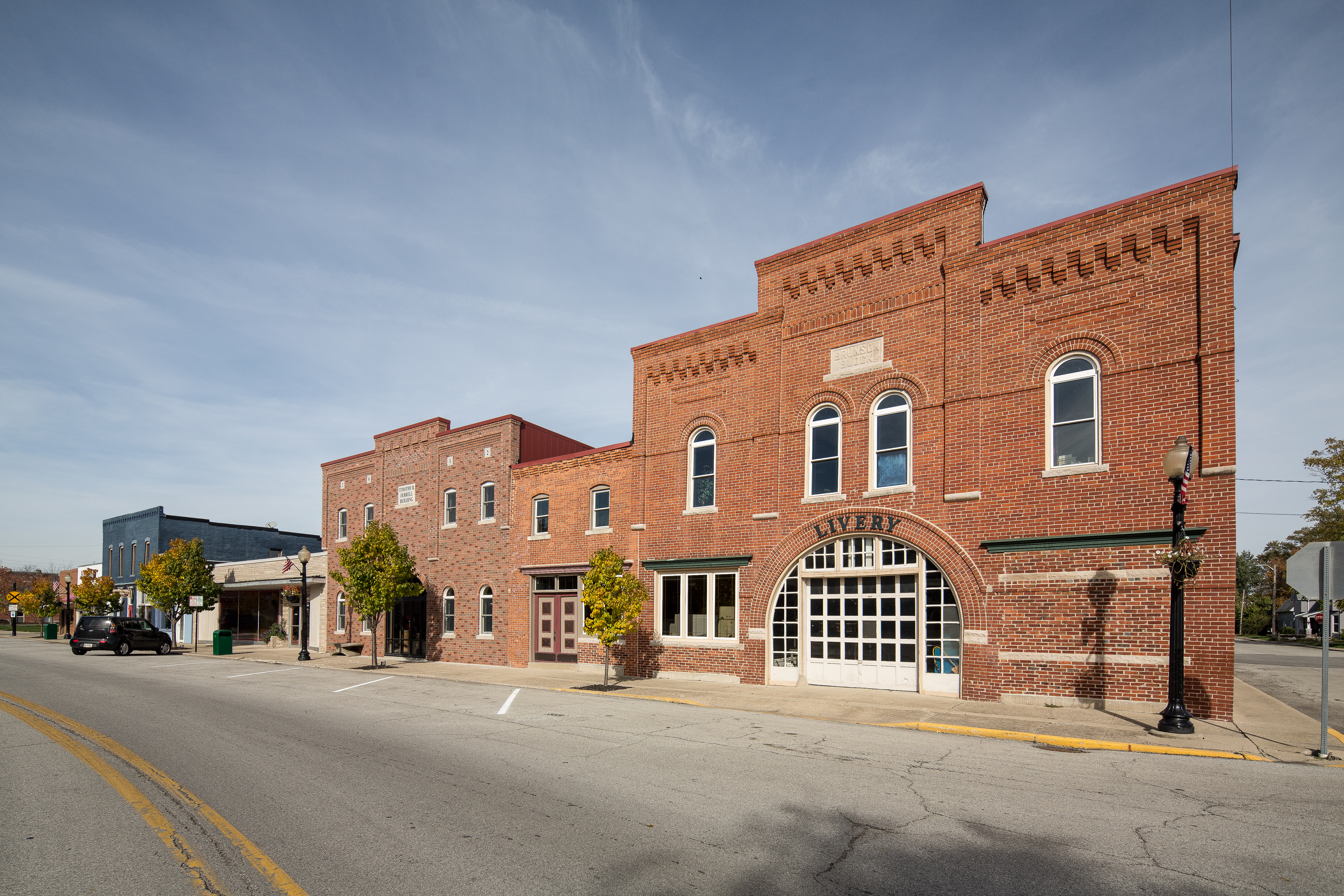
- View of Main St at Pearl St

- Seal

- Location of Fortville in Hancock County, Indiana.
- Coordinates: 39°56′5″N 85°50′50″W
- Country: United States
- State: Indiana
- County: Hancock
- Township: Vernon
- Established: 1865

Government
  - Town Council: Tonya Davis (R), President; Ryan Rummell (R), Vice-President; Fritz Fentz (I); Libby Wyatt (R); Sean Morgan (R)
  - Town Manager: Joe Renner
  - Clerk-Treasurer: Melissa Glazier

Area
  - Total: 4.11 sq mi (10.6 km^{2})
- Elevation: 853 ft (260 m)

Population (2020)
  - Total: 4,784
  - Density: 1,386.7/sq mi (535.39/km^{2})
- Time zone: UTC-5 (EST)
  - Summer (DST): UTC-4 (EDT)
- ZIP code: 46040
- Area codes: 317 and 463
- FIPS code: 18-24286
- GNIS feature ID: 2396943
- Website: fortville.in.gov

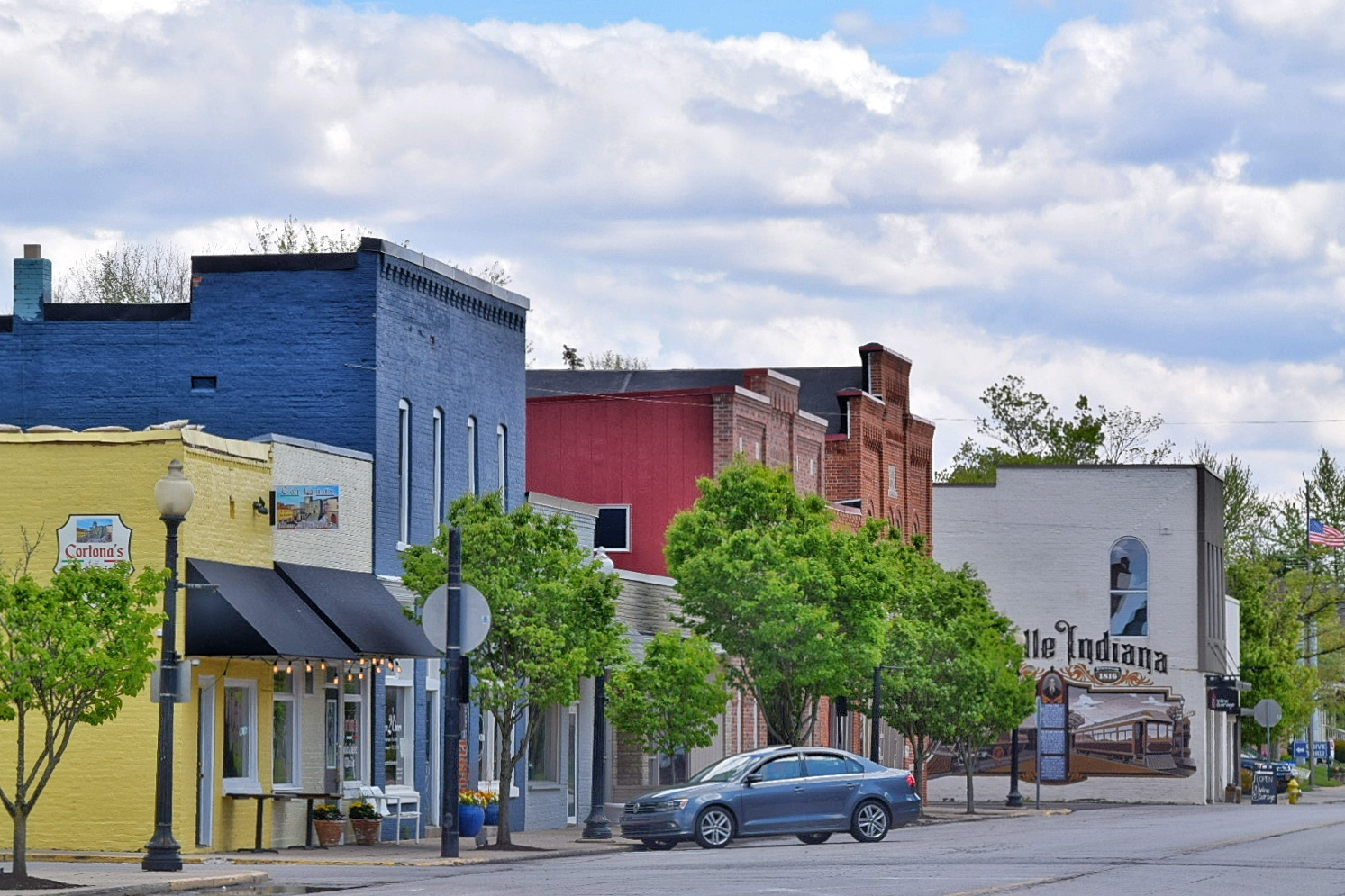
Fortville downtown

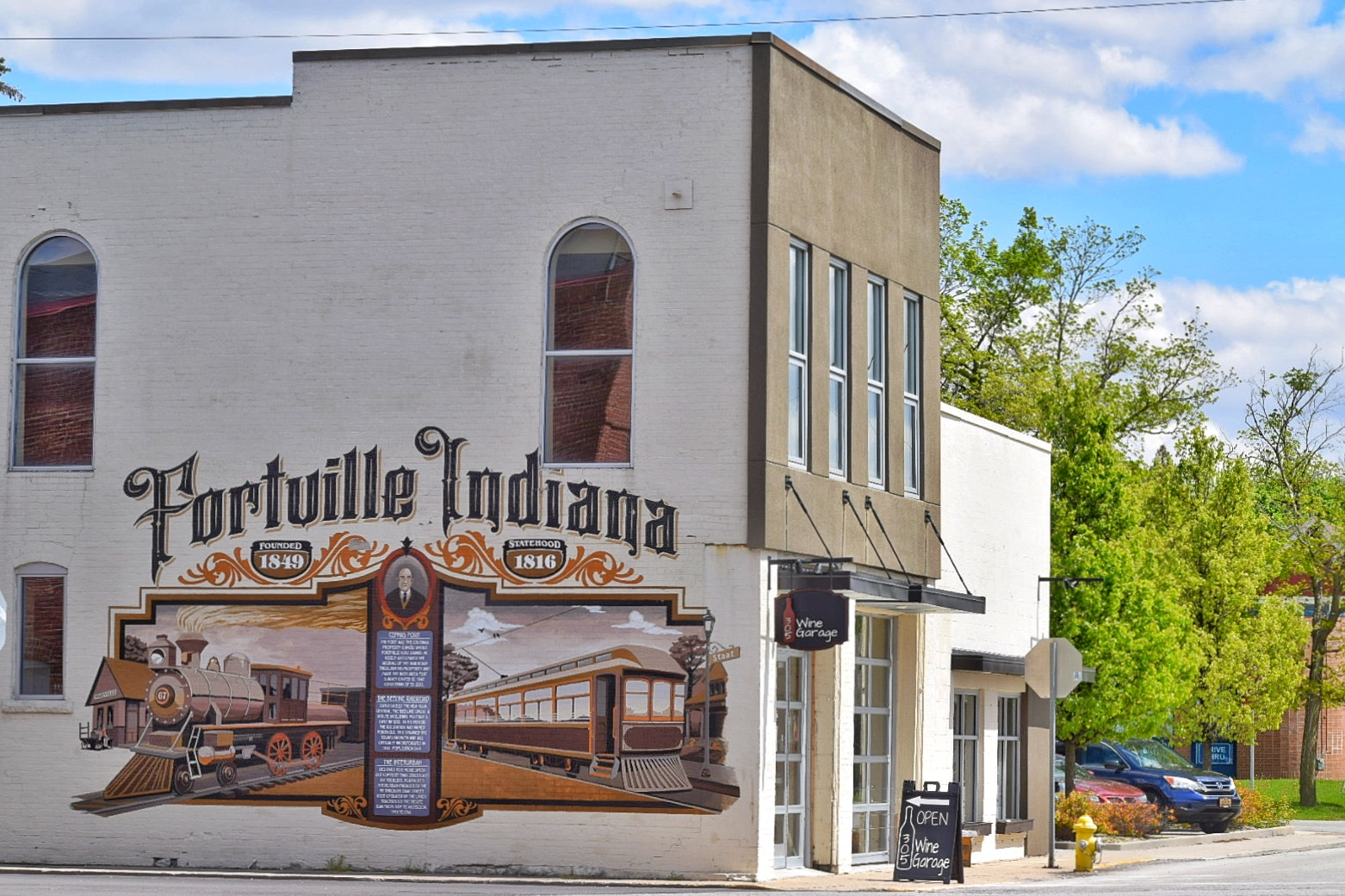
Fortville, Indiana

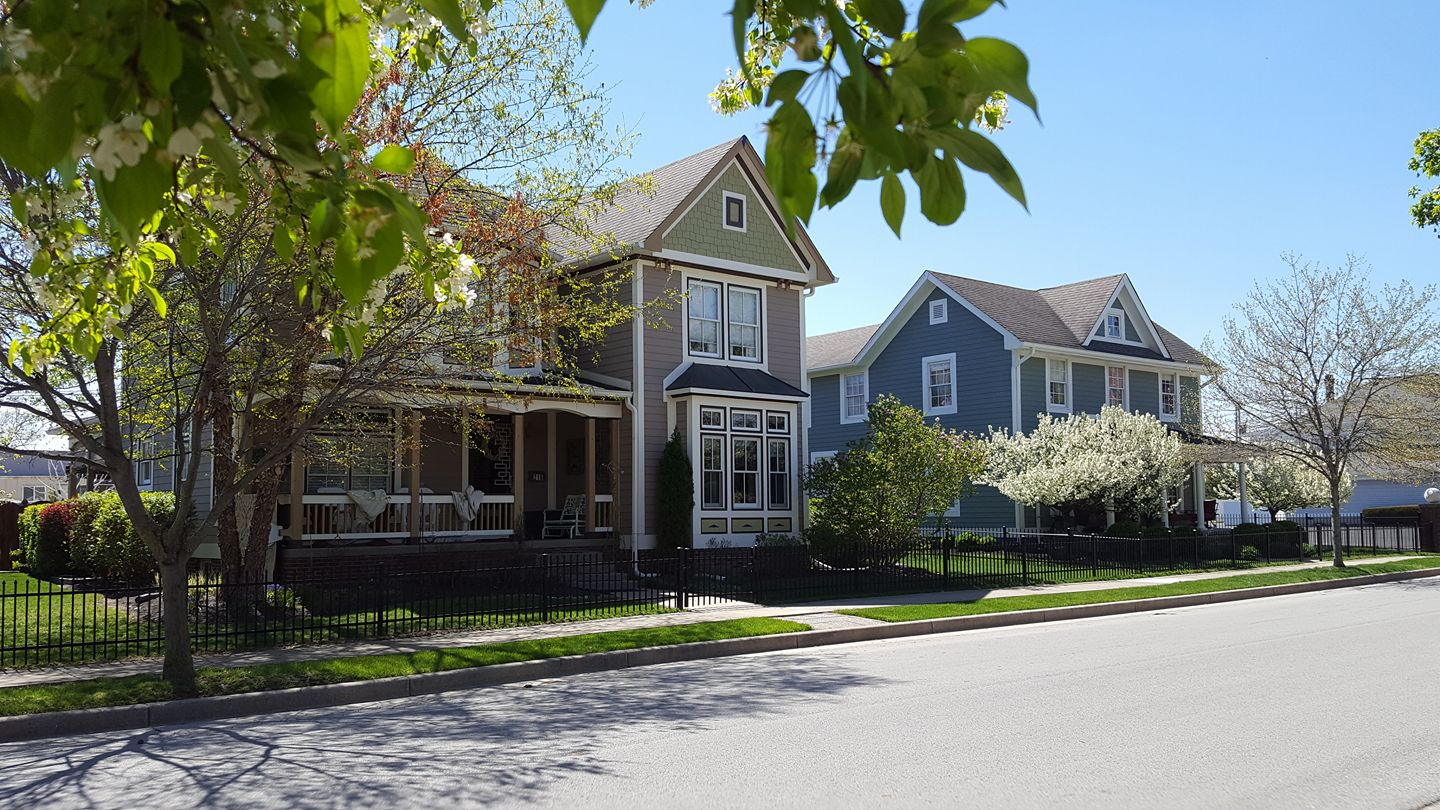
Houses, Staat St, Fortville, Indiana USA

Fortville is a town in Vernon Township, Hancock County, Indiana, United States. The population was 4,784 at the 2020 census and is estimated by the Town government to be over 6,000 as of December 2025.

== Geography ==
Fortville is located in the northwest corner of Hancock County, Indiana, immediately adjacent to neighboring Hamilton County, which forms the town's northwest boundary and Madison County, which borders to the north. It is approximately 25 miles (40.23 km) northeast of downtown Indianapolis, Indiana, and is a part of the Indianapolis metropolitan area.

As of March 2026, based on data from the Town of Fortville, the town is approximately 4.11 square miles large in surface area.

== History ==
When settlers first arrived in the area, the Miami peoples and possibly Shawnee inhabited the area that is now Fortville. One of the most influential early settlers was Francis Kincade, he owned 24 lots right where the Greenfield-Noblesville Pike (Old SR 238/Southeastern Parkway/Merrill Street) and Main Street. (Now US 36/State Road 67) intersected. There were well established roads on his property as early as 1826.

The settlement that became Fortville was originally named Phoebe Fort before it was changed to Walpole after a Greenfield politician named Thomas D. Walpole. Under the latter name was laid out and platted in 1849. The current namesake, Cephas Fort was the original owner of the town site. Fortville was incorporated as a town in 1865.

The historic Browne-Rafert House on Merrill Street was listed on the National Register of Historic Places in 2015.

== Demographics ==
Historical population
Census	Pop.	Note	%±
1870	387		—
1880	634		63.8%
1890	685		8.0%
1900	1,006		46.9%
1910	1,174		16.7%
1920	1,213		3.3%
1930	1,289		6.3%
1940	1,463		13.5%
1950	1,786		22.1%
1960	2,209		23.7%
1970	2,460		11.4%
1980	2,787		13.3%
1990	2,690		−3.5%
2000	3,444		28.0%
2010	3,929		14.1%
2020	4,784		21.8%
U.S. Decennial Census

=== 2020 census ===
As of the 2020 census, Fortville had a population of 4,784. The median age was 35.3 years. 25.7% of residents were under the age of 18 and 13.6% of residents were 65 years of age or older. For every 100 females there were 94.0 males, and for every 100 females age 18 and over there were 91.7 males age 18 and over.

98.3% of residents lived in urban areas, while 1.7% lived in rural areas.

There were 1,970 households in Fortville, of which 34.6% had children under the age of 18 living in them. Of all households, 45.0% were married-couple households, 18.7% were households with a male householder and no spouse or partner present, and 28.2% were households with a female householder and no spouse or partner present. About 27.4% of all households were made up of individuals and 10.3% had someone living alone who was 65 years of age or older.

There were 2,057 housing units, of which 4.2% were vacant. The homeowner vacancy rate was 1.2% and the rental vacancy rate was 3.6%.

Racial composition as of the 2020 census
Race	Number	Percent
White	4,268	89.2%
Black or African American	86	1.8%
American Indian and Alaska Native	16	0.3%
Asian	44	0.9%
Native Hawaiian and Other Pacific Islander	7	0.1%
Some other race	76	1.6%
Two or more races	287	6.0%
Hispanic or Latino (of any race)	136	2.8%

=== 2010 census ===
As of the census of 2010, there were 3,929 people, 1,553 households, and 1,060 families living in the town. The population density was 1,318.5 inhabitants per square mile (509.1/km^{2}). There were 1,705 housing units at an average density of 572.1 per square mile (220.9/km^{2}). The racial makeup of the town was 96.2% White, 1.3% Black, 0.3% Native American, 0.1% Asian, 0.9% from other races, and 1.3% from two or more races. Hispanic or Latino of any race were 2.3% of the population.

There were 1,553 households, of which 37.7% had children under the age of 18 living with them, 47.6% were married couples living together, 14.5% had a female householder with no husband present, 6.1% had a male householder with no wife present, and 31.7% were non-families. 26.8% of all households were made up of individuals, and 9.1% had someone living alone who was 65 years of age or older. The average household size was 2.53 and the average family size was 3.03.

The median age in the town was 35.7 years. 28.3% of residents were under the age of 18; 7.4% were between the ages of 18 and 24; 28.4% were from 25 to 44; 24.1% were from 45 to 64; and 11.6% were 65 years of age or older. The gender makeup of the town was 48.6% male and 51.4% female.

=== 2000 census ===
As of the census of 2000, there were 3,444 people, 1,394 households, and 950 families living in the town. The population density was 2,831.8 inhabitants per square mile (1,093.4/km^{2}). There were 1,454 housing units at an average density of 1,195.5 per square mile (461.6/km^{2}). The racial makeup of the town was 98.14% White, 0.06% African American, 0.06% Native American, 0.17% Asian, 0.73% from other races, and 0.84% from two or more races. Hispanic or Latino of any race were 1.74% of the population.

There were 1,394 households, out of which 36.2% had children under the age of 18 living with them, 52.4% were married couples living together, 11.9% had a female householder with no husband present, and 31.8% were non-families. 27.8% of all households were made up of individuals, and 11.8% had someone living alone who was 65 years of age or older. The average household size was 2.46 and the average family size was 3.03.

In the town, the population was spread out, with 27.8% under the age of 18, 7.9% from 18 to 24, 33.0% from 25 to 44, 19.4% from 45 to 64, and 11.9% who were 65 years of age or older. The median age was 34 years. For every 100 females there were 91.2 males. For every 100 females age 18 and over, there were 85.2 males.

The median income for a household in the town was $42,642, and the median income for a family was $49,010. Males had a median income of $37,723 versus $25,951 for females. The per capita income for the town was $17,745. About 4.3% of families and 6.5% of the population were below the poverty line, including 9.8% of those under age 18 and 8.4% of those age 65 or over.

== Parks ==
Landmark Park is located at Staat Street and Veteran's Court, just east of Main Street.

The entrance to Memorial Park is located just west of Church and McCarty streets.

== Education ==
The town houses the administrative offices and most schools for the Mt. Vernon Community Schools Corporation including Fortville Elementary School (new building in 2025), Mt. Vernon Intermediate School, Mt. Vernon Middle School, and Mt. Vernon High School.

The town has a lending library, the Vernon Township Public Library.

== Economy ==
Fortville's historic downtown is home to local retailers, restaurants, and service providers. The downtown is also an attraction for arts and culture.
