= Central Campus (Des Moines, Iowa) =

Public magnet school in Des Moines

Location
- 1800 Grand Ave; Des Moines, Iowa
- Coordinates: 41°35′3″N 93°38′31″W

Information
- Established: c. 1982
- Website: https://centralcampus.dmschools.org/

Central Campus is a public magnet school in the Des Moines Independent Community School District supplying elective and artistic classes with over 2,000 students participating in their programs from high schools in Des Moines, Iowa.

Central Campus provides optional elective and artistic educational programs for students in East, Hoover, Lincoln, North, and Roosevelt high schools, students from other schools around Iowa can also make course requests. Students do not spend the whole school day in Central Campus as they would in a traditional high school, students stay for the time of classes that they are enrolled in, later returning to the high school they are also enrolled in for their remaining classes. Students are offered scheduled bus routes to and from Central Campus and their high school. Students can participate in classes such as aviation, culinary, anatomy, marine biology, broadcasting and many more. The school also offers many college credit courses from nearby DMACC, free of charge to students. The campus formerly had its own radio station (KDPS 88.1) led by its students.
