= Central Academy (disambiguation) =

Central Academy may refer to:

- Central Academy, a historical site in Palatka, Florida
- Central Academy (Des Moines), a magnet school in Des Moines, Iowa
- Central Academy (Michigan), a charter high school in Ann Arbor, Michigan
- Central Academy (Mississippi), a former segregation academy in Macon, Mississippi
- Central Academy (Kalgan), a former military intelligence school for the Japanese Kempeitai in Zhangjiakou, China
- Central Academy (Ranchi), a private school in Ranchi, India
