= East High School (Waterloo, Iowa) =

Public secondary school in Waterloo, Iowa, United States

Coordinates: 42.502°N 92.329°W

Waterloo East High School

Location
- 214 High Street; Waterloo, Iowa 50703; USA

Information
- Type: Public
- Established: 1874
- School district: Waterloo Community School District
- Principal: Byron Phillips
- Teaching staff: 52.41 (FTE)
- Grades: 9–12
- Enrollment: 1,013 (2023–2024)
- Student to teacher ratio: 19.33
- Colors: Orange and black
- Mascot: Trojan
- Rival: Waterloo West High School
- Affiliation: Iowa Alliance Conference
- Website: easthigh.waterlooschools.org
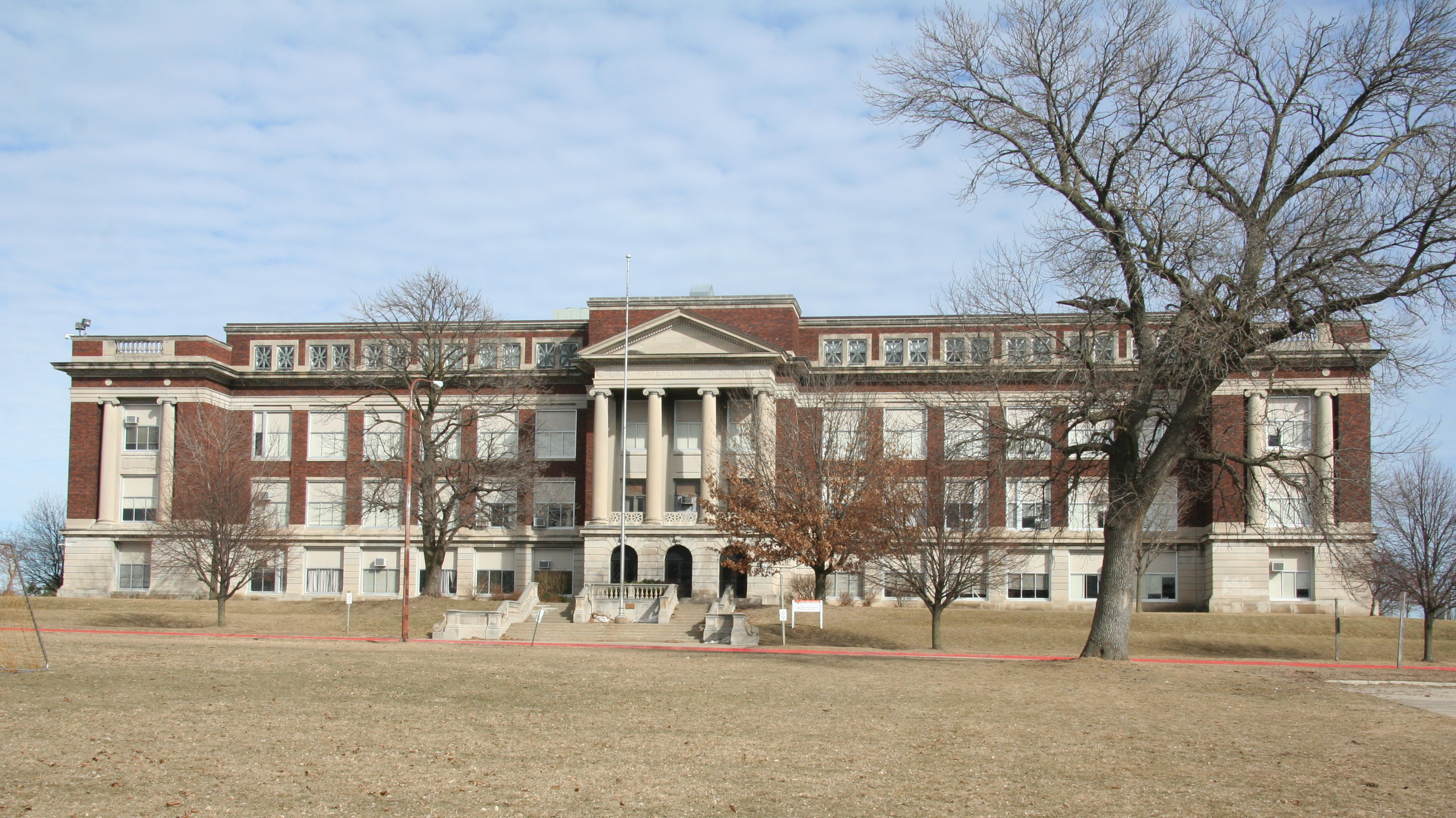
- Waterloo East High School

Waterloo East High School in Waterloo, Iowa, United States is a public high school consisting of approximately 1000 students in grades 9–12. It is a part of the Waterloo Community School District.

== History ==
The school was founded at its current site in 1874, with the present building being built in 1918. In 1939, the Music and Industrial Arts wing was added, and the Fred J. Miller gymnasium was built in 1957. The "new wing" which includes a swimming pool and classrooms was built in 1962. In 1981 East High transformed from a three-year to a four year high school. In April 2002, a new administrative and counseling center and an addition that features a new cafeteria/commons, practice gymnasium, wrestling room and locker rooms were opened. The old cafeteria area on the 4th floor was converted into eight new classrooms. The newly renovated Elizabeth A. H. Green Auditorium reopened in October 2007. The Reggie Roby Fitness Center was opened in 2008. Additional renovations will take place in the years to come, funded by a local 1 cent local option sales tax.

On October 8, 2025, it was revealed that East and Waterloo West would be consolidated into one school. That same day, it was revealed to be under the “Waterloo United.”

== Culture and diversity ==
East High is known throughout the state for its diverse student body consisting of proportions of minority students that far outpace the state averages. African Americans, Bosnian, and, increasingly, Hispanic students make up a significant portion of the student body alongside White students.

The racial makeup of the school during the 2015–16 school year was 49% White, 33% African-American, 11% Hispanic, 5% multiracial and 2% from other races.

== Athletics ==
The Trojans compete in the Iowa Alliance Conference in the following sports:

- Cross country
- Volleyball
- Football
  - 6-time State Champions (1966, 1967, 1968, 1969, 1970, 1971)
- Basketball
  - Boys' 3-time State Champions (1974, 1990, 2003)
- Wrestling
  - 8-time State Champions (1953, 1957, 1958, 1960, 1961, 1963, 1964, 1983)
- Track and field
  - Boys' 1979 Class AA State Champions
- Golf
  - 1971 Coed State Champions
- Soccer
- Softball
- Baseball
  - 1954 State Champions
- Tennis
- Bowling

The East High Trojans have a long tradition of athletics in high school achievements and in athletes who have gone on to play collegiately and professionally. Alumni include NFL all-Pro punter and 1980s All-Decade Team member Reggie Roby, NFL wide receiver/returner J.J. Moses, and MLB player Rich Folkers.

East High's men's basketball team is the marquee program at the school and has a long tradition of success, consistently reaching the state tournament and cracking national rankings at times. The Trojans have won state tournaments in 1974 (Class 2A), 1990 (3A) and 2003 (4A), and were runners-up in 1960 (A), 1991 (3A), 2002 (4A), and 2004 (4A). Head Coach Steve McGraw won his 500th game during the 2003 state tournament and was featured on the cover of the best-selling Successful Coaching textbook in 2004.

East High has the distinction, as of 2005, of holding both the record for longest football winning streak (55 wins from 1965 to 1971) and longest football losing streak in the state of Iowa (62 games from 1999 to 2006). However, a youth program has generated a newfound interest in and focus on developing football talent in the area. Also, the NFL recently made Waterloo the only metro with a population under 300,000 to be named a site of one of their fully funded youth football camps. The results of the emphasis on youth football in the area showed when the record losing streak was broken on October 13, 2006, and the 2010 football team made the playoffs for the first time since 1991. They continued to struggle, not winning a game from 2012 to 2016. This 37-game losing streak was broken with a win on August 25, 2017.

In the spring of 2021, East began exploring its athletic conference future after – especially in recent seasons – the Trojans consistently ranked near or at the bottom of the Mississippi Valley Conference all-sports rankings as the school's enrollment declined. Participation numbers in sports also have decreased, according to district officials. In June 2021, the district's school board approved East High's request to move to a new, as-of-yet-unnamed athletic conference, also including 10 current Central Iowa Metro League members, which earlier in 2021 broke off from that league's suburban schools for the same reasons. Despite the move, plans would be in place for East to continue its local rivalries with cross-town schools West and Columbus Catholic, and Cedar Falls.

== Notable alumni ==
- Jerome Amos Jr., member of the Iowa House of Representatives
- Rich Folkers, Major League Baseball pitcher
- Robert D. Fulton, 37th governor of Iowa
- Kyven Gadson, 2015 NCAA National Wrestling champion
- MarTay Jenkins, NFL receiver/returner; transferred out of the school after his sophomore season
- J.J. Moses, NFL receiver/returner
- Reggie Roby, punter on NFL's 1980s All-Decade Team
- Tom Smith, football player

== See also ==
- List of high schools in Iowa
