= Ace Hendricks =

American football player (born c.1947)

No. 47
- Positions: Wide receiver, defensive back

Personal information
- Born: November 12, 1948 (age 77); Des Moines, Iowa, U.S.
- Listed height: 6 ft 1 in (1.85 m)
- Listed weight: 195 lb (88 kg)

Career information
- High school: Abraham Lincoln (Des Moines, Iowa)
- College: New Mexico (1966–1968)

Horace "Ace" Hendricks (born c. 1947) was an American football wide receiver and defensive back. He played college football for the New Mexico Lobos from 1966 to 1968. He missed much of his sophomore season in 1966 with a knee injury that required surgery. As a junior in 1967, he led the Western Athletic Conference (WAC) and ranked fourth nationally with 1,094 receiving yards. He also ranked fifth nationally with 67 receptions. As a senior in 1968, his offensive output declined (17 receptions, 158 yards), but he won All-WAC honors for his performance as a defensive back.

Hendricks also played professional football in 1969 for the Las Vegas Cowboys of the Continental Football League. He tallied 52 receptions for 771 yards and seven touchdowns during the 1969 season.
