= Stephen Kline =

American contemporary artist (born 1943)

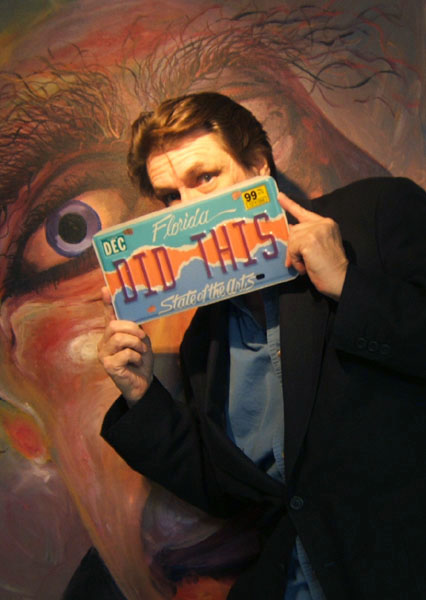
- Born: Stephen Neil Kline; December 12, 1943; Des Moines, Iowa, U.S.
- Education: Drake University
- Known for: Painting, Drawing, Photography
- Notable work: Florida State-of-the-Arts license plate, Lines of Language paintings and drawings (over 125 dog breed lithographs drawn from the breed's name).
- Movement: Lines of Language

Stephen Kline (born 1943) is an American contemporary artist who works primarily in acrylics and ink.

== Early life ==
Born in 1943 in Des Moines, Iowa, Kline spent his early years with his parents and older sister Martha in a small house on the east side of Des Moines. As a junior in high school, he designed the senior class yearbook cover for East Des Moines High School before graduating the following year and attending Drake University, where he studied art under Stan Hess and Leonard Good. After college, he accepted a position with former LOOK Magazine in their art department.

== Beginning career ==
In 1964, Kline moved to Omaha, Nebraska where his fine art was first accepted in a museum show: the Tenth Midwest Biennial at the Joslyn Museum, Omaha, Nebraska. Commercially, he moved quickly from the Omaha World Herald art department through a succession of advertising agencies, landing a job with Bozell & Jacobs Advertising.

In 1973, he and his writer wife Kris Limberg Kline began Kline Photography Studios, which produced both fine arts and commercial photography. During this period, Stephen was one of the leading pioneers of panoramic photography in multimedia. Meanwhile, he used every spare moment to pursue his fine arts career.

In 1982, they moved their family to Westfield, NJ. Kline was soon accepted as a gallery artist at Foxworth Gallery on Madison Ave. in Manhattan, where his work made headlines when his provocative painting Madonna and Child caused street demonstrations in 1985, It was in this period when he began combining his painting and photography into one medium. Portrait of a Painter was chosen for the 1987 New Jersey Arts Annual at the Jersey City Museum, and his photo/art piece of Isaac Asimov was printed in Communicator's Journal.

== Art drawn from words ==
Two years after relocating to Ellenton, FL in 1991, Kline painted his first Lines of Language painting, signing his name over and over. Titled 3795 Signatures, the abstract was chosen for the 1994 Florida National, Florida State University Museum of Fine Arts, Tallahassee, Florida.

It was also in 1994 that Kline designed the Florida State of the Arts license plate.

In 1999, Kline created his first realistic drawing using his new Lines of Language technique to create an image of Santa out of the words Season's Greetings. He had his drawing printed as a lithograph, added additional words with gold and silver applied pen-and-ink to individualize each piece, and sent them out to family, friends, business associates and patrons. The next year, when he noticed how many recipients had framed the art, he decided to use his Lines of Language technique to create his first dog lithograph. Throughout the next several years, Kline has drawn over 125 breeds.

== Gallery ==
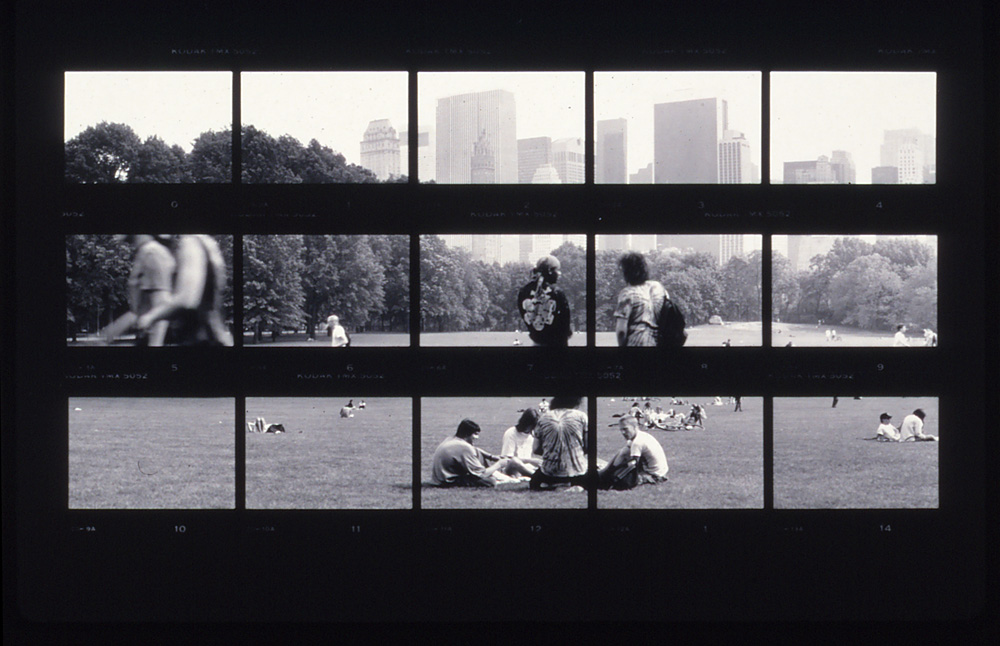
This multiple image photograph was made in Central Park, New York City. The viewer will see the same person several times throughout the print.

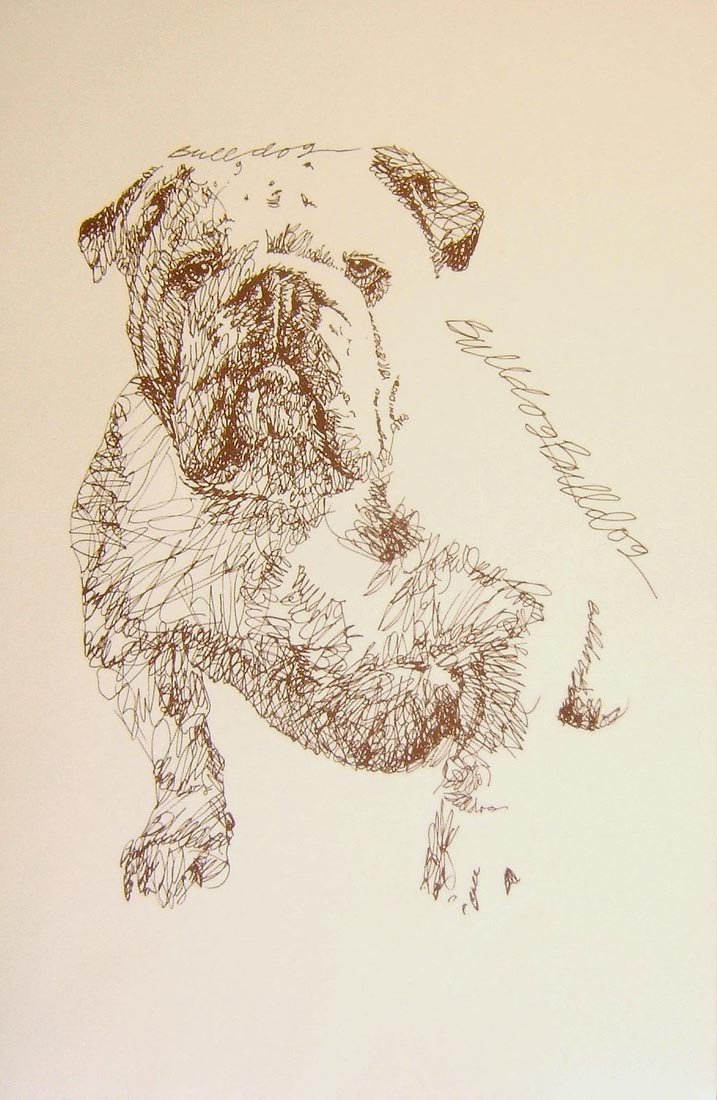
Kline's art written from the word over and over.

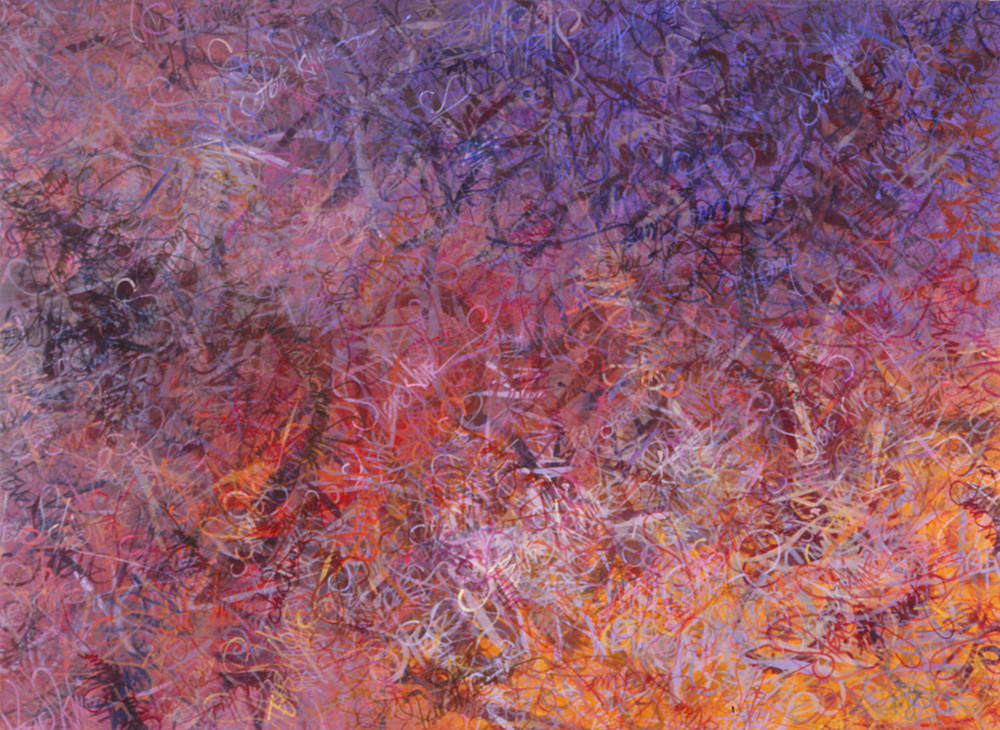
Kline's painting 3795 Signatures.

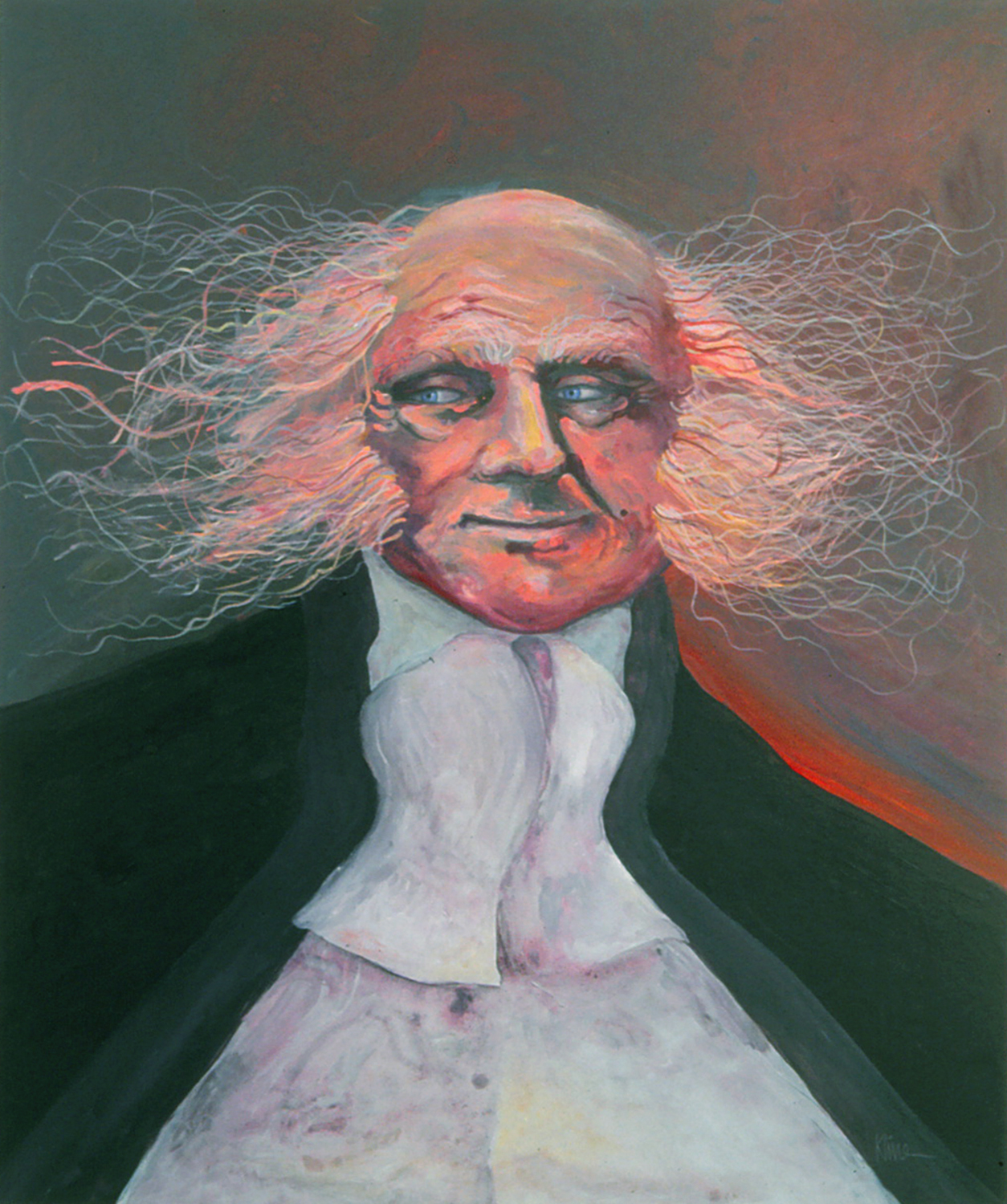
PUBLIC ART: Kline's painting the Solicitor hangs in the office of the Chief Judge of Hillsborough County, Florida, purchased by Hillsborough County for their permanent collection..

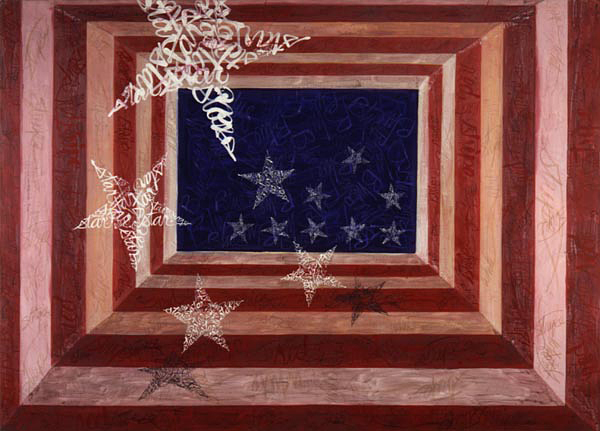
PUBLIC ART: Kline's painting,"Red, White, and Blue Stars and Stripes," is on public view in Hillsborough County Center, purchased for the county's permanent collection.
