= Tom Smith (American football) =

American football player (born 1949)

No. 29
- Position: Running back

Personal information
- Born: October 4, 1949 (age 77); Waterloo, Iowa, U.S.
- Listed height: 6 ft 1 in (1.85 m)
- Listed weight: 216 lb (98 kg)

Career information
- High school: East (Waterloo)
- College: Iowa (1968–1969); Miami (1970–1972)
- NFL draft: 1973: 7th round, 182nd overall pick

Career history
- Miami Dolphins (1973); Jacksonville Sharks (1974); Atlanta Falcons (1975)*; San Francisco 49ers (1976)*
- * Offseason or practice squad member only

Awards and highlights
- Super Bowl champion (VIII)
- Stats at Pro Football Reference

Thomas Eric Smith (born October 4, 1949) is an American former professional football running back who played one season with the Miami Dolphins of the National Football League (NFL). He played college football for the Iowa Hawkeyes and Miami Hurricanes. He also played for the Jacksonville Sharks of the World Football League (WFL). Smith was a member of the Dolphins team that won Super Bowl VIII.

== Early life ==
Thomas Eric Smith was born on October 4, 1949, in Waterloo, Iowa. He attended Waterloo East High School in Waterloo.

== College career ==
Smith was a member of the Iowa Hawkeyes of the University of Iowa from 1968 to 1969. He was a letterman in 1969. During the 1969 season, he rushed 66 times for 343 yards and one touchdown while also catching five passes for 57 yards.

Smith was then a member of the Miami Hurricanes of the University of Miami from 1970 to 1972. He was a letterman in 1970 and 1972. He did not play in 1971 due to being ruled ineligible. As a senior in 1972, he rushed the ball 91 times for 457 yards and three touchdowns along with six receptions for 41 yards.

== Professional career ==
Smith was selected by the Miami Dolphins in the seventh round, with the 182nd overall pick, of the 1973 NFL draft. He officially signed with the team on February 19. He played in two games for the Dolphins during the 1973 season. On January 13, 1974, the Dolphins won Super Bowl VIII against the Minnesota Vikings. Smith was released on September 10, 1974.

He then played in three games for the Jacksonville Sharks of the World Football League (WFL) in 1974, totaling ten carries for 21 yards and two receptions for 11 yards.

Smith signed with the Atlanta Falcons in 1975. He was released by the Falcons on August 19, 1975.

On June 1, 1976, it was reported that Smith had signed with the San Francisco 49ers. He was released on August 3, 1976.
