= Jordan Bernstine =

American football player (born 1989)

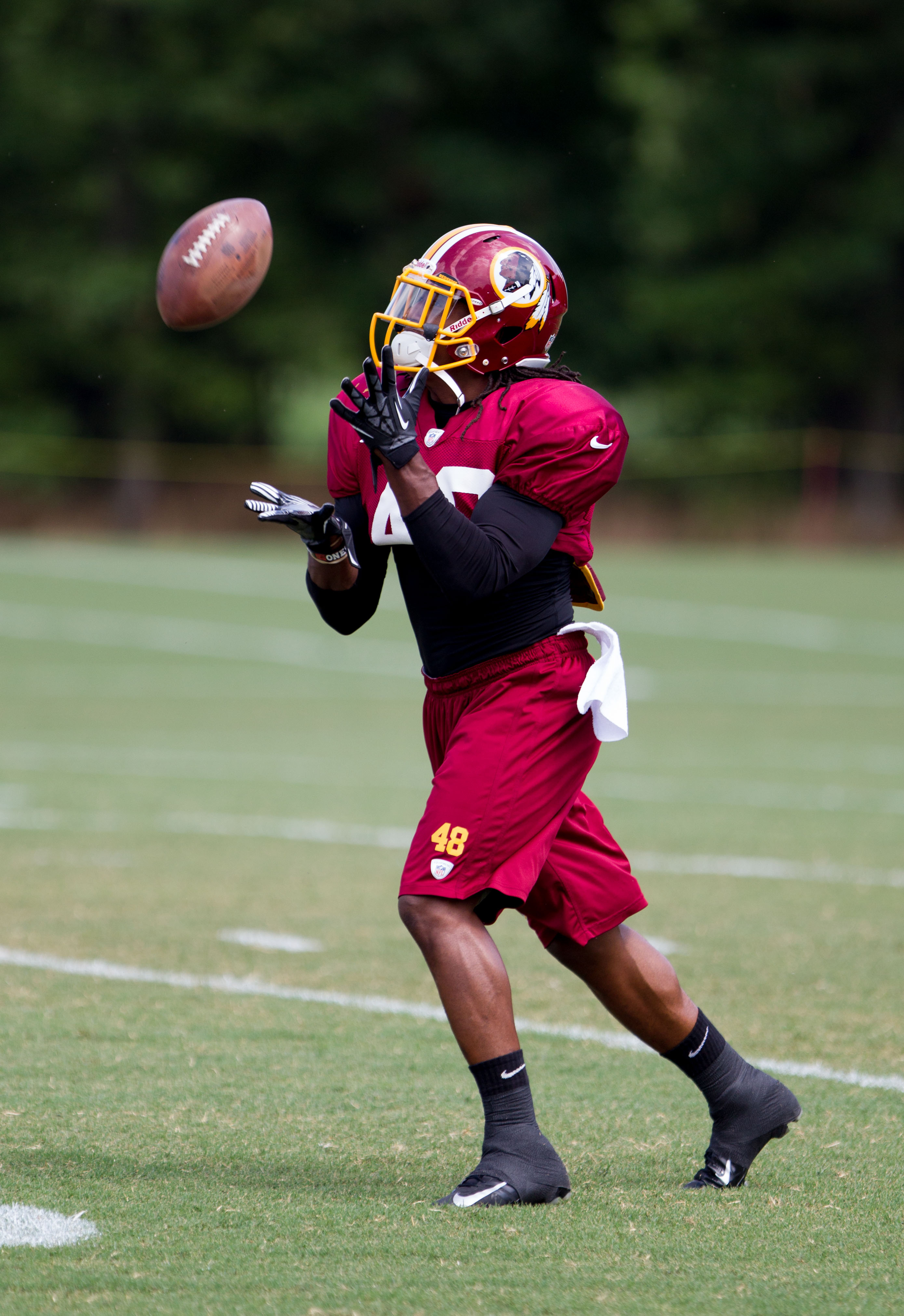
- Bernstine with the Washington Redskins in 2012

No. 48
- Position: Safety

Personal information
- Born: May 31, 1989 (age 37); Des Moines, Iowa, U.S.
- Listed height: 5 ft 11 in (1.80 m)
- Listed weight: 205 lb (93 kg)

Career information
- High school: Lincoln (Des Moines)
- College: Iowa
- NFL draft: 2012: 7th round, 217th overall pick

Career history
- Washington Redskins (2012)

Career NFL statistics
- Games played: 1
- Stats at Pro Football Reference

Jordan Bernstine (born May 31, 1989) is an American former professional football player who was a safety in the National Football League (NFL). He was selected by the Washington Redskins in the seventh round of the 2012 NFL draft. He played college football for the Iowa Hawkeyes.

== Early life ==
Bernstine was a three-year starter at Des Moines Lincoln for Lincoln football coach Tom Mihalovich. Bernstine was a running back and a defensive back for the Railsplitters and was a leader in the school's back-to-back playoff appearances in 2005 and 2006. Bernstine was the #1 ranked prospect in the state of Iowa in 2007.

Bernstine held 18 schools records upon graduation (currently holds 17) including interception yards in a game (111, vs. Roosevelt, 2005); interception yards in a season (199, 2006), and career (413, 2004-06), and tied with most interceptions in a career (11), which now sits as second most. Most punt return yards in a season (392, 2005), and yards in a career (941), average per return in a season (32.6) when he returned 12 for 392 yards and led Iowa's Class 4A; and average in a career (27.6) 34-941. His 37 kickoff returns is the most in a career, as is the 1,579 yards; his 46.5-average in 2005 (15-698) is the best in a season, and again, led Class 4A in that category. He also holds the record for average in a career (42.6). He holds the record for most unassisted tackles in a career (150) and is fifth all-time in total tackles with 208. He also recovered five fumbles. On offense, he still holds the record for yards per carry in a career (10.4) as he ran for 1,639 yards on 158 carries - scoring 20 touchdowns on the ground. He is the leader in all-purpose yards in a game (rushing-receiving-punt returns-kickoff yards-interception yards) with 398 against Roosevelt in 2005, when he rushed for 100 yards, had 69 receiving, 35 on punt returns, 83 on kickoffs, and 111 on interceptions). He had 2,193 that same season (610-349-392-698-146) and had 4.932 in his career (1,639-360-941-1,579-413). He also punted 14 times for a 39.0-average, caught 19 passes for 360 yards, and scored 29 career touchdowns, scoring 174 points, 20 rushing, four on receptions, three by kickoff return, and two interceptions.

A Parade all-American, Bernstine played in both the East Meets West All-American Game in Orlando and the Iowa Shrine Bowl in 2007; he was a two-time Elite all-state selection by the Des Moines Register (2005, 2006), and is currently the only Railsplitter to do so. He was a two-time, first-team all-Central Iowa Metro League defensive back (2005-2006), and a second-team selection as a sophomore (2004).

== College career ==
Bernstine played for the Hawkeyes at the University of Iowa for four years from 2007 to 2011, lettering in 2007, 2008, 2010, and 2011. His jersey number was 4. He played cornerback for his first three years before switching over to the safety position in his senior year. In four seasons, Bernstine saw action in 44 games, starting 11 (all as a senior) and recorded 60 solo tackles and 54 assists; had three tackles for loss, a quarterback sack, and one interception as well as two pass deflections and a fumble recovery; he returned 32 kickoffs for a 23.1-average. He played in 2007 as a true freshman, was redshirted in 2009 due to an ankle injury during pre-season practice.

== Professional career ==
Pre-draft measurables
Height	Weight	40-yard dash	10-yard split	20-yard split	20-yard shuttle	Three-cone drill	Vertical jump	Broad jump	Bench press
5 ft 10 1/8 in (1.78 m)	210 lb (95 kg)	4.43 s	1.54 s	2.52 s	4.31 s	6.97 s	41.0 in (1.04 m)	10 ft 7 in (3.23 m)	18 reps
All values from Pro Day

Bernstine was selected in the seventh round of the 2012 NFL draft by the Washington Redskins, he was the team's last pick for this draft. He was reunited with Iowa teammate, Adam Gettis, who was selected earlier. On May 4, 2012, the Redskins officially signed him to a four-year contract. After having a good preseason, that included displaying good tackling skills and having an interception in the last preseason game, he made the final 53-man roster at the start of the 2012 season. During his NFL debut against the New Orleans Saints, he suffered a right knee injury while playing on special teams during a kickoff in the fourth quarter and was carted off the field. The next day, it was confirmed that Bernstine had torn the anterior, posterior, and medial collateral ligaments in his knee, ending his rookie season.

The Redskins released him on July 25, 2013.

== Personal life ==
Bernstine is the nephew of retired tight end and running back, Rod Bernstine, who played for the San Diego Chargers and Denver Broncos.
