= Trevon Young =

American football player (born 1995)

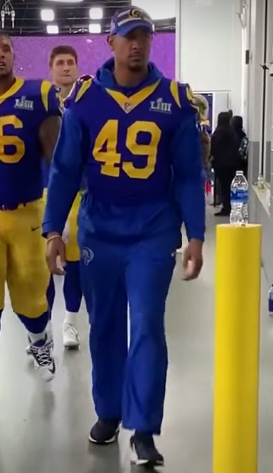
- Young with the Los Angeles Rams after Super Bowl LIII

No. 49
- Position: Defensive end

Personal information
- Born: April 1, 1995 (age 31); Des Moines, Iowa, U.S.
- Listed height: 6 ft 4 in (1.93 m)
- Listed weight: 259 lb (117 kg)

Career information
- High school: Lincoln (Des Moines)
- College: Louisville
- NFL draft: 2018: 6th round, 205th overall pick

Career history
- Los Angeles Rams (2018–2019); Cleveland Browns (2019–2020); Ottawa Redblacks (2022)*; Massachusetts Pirates (2023)
- * Offseason or practice squad member only

Awards and highlights
- ACC Brian Piccolo Award (2017)

Career NFL statistics
- Fumble recoveries: 1
- Stats at Pro Football Reference

Trevon Antonio Young (born April 1, 1995) is an American former professional football player who was a defensive end in the National Football League (NFL). He played college football for the Louisville Cardinals. He has been a member of the Los Angeles Rams and Cleveland Browns of the NFL, the Ottawa Redblacks of the Canadian Football League (CFL), and the Massachusetts Pirates of the Indoor Football League (IFL).

== Early life ==
Young attended Abraham Lincoln High School in Des Moines, Iowa. He was a three-year starter and two-time first-team all-conference linebacker for the Railsplitters; in three seasons Young amassed 112 tackles, 87 of those solo, nine tackles for loss, an interception and two fumble recoveries. On offense he caught 29 passes for 442 yards and eight touchdowns, punted 29 times for a 33.5 average, and had 40 kickoffs for a 43.7-yard average. Young also returned seven kickoffs for 201 yards, a 28.7 yard average, and had two rushes for 3 yards. In 2011, his junior year, Young led Lincoln with 61 tackles, 47 solos; caught 11 passes for 170 yards and three touchdowns for a 9–2 squad that won the Central Iowa Metro League's Metro conference title. His senior season he played in just five games but accounted for 29 tackles, caught 11 passes for 197 yards and three touchdowns, as well as punting 25 times for a 33.8-yard average with a long of 57 yards.

== College career ==
Young initially committed to the University of Iowa, but after two arrests in less than 5 months, Young's offer was rescinded. After spending his freshman season at Iowa Western Community College in 2013, Young would sign on to play for the University of Louisville. In 2017 he had 12 tackles for losses, including 4 1/2 sacks after sitting out the prior season with a hip injury.

== Professional career ==
Pre-draft measurables
Height	Weight	40-yard dash	10-yard split	20-yard split	20-yard shuttle	Three-cone drill	Vertical jump	Broad jump	Bench press
6 ft 3 7/8 in (1.93 m)	258 lb (117 kg)	4.78 s	1.62 s	2.74 s	4.40 s	6.99 s	33 in (0.84 m)	9 ft 6 in (2.90 m)	25 reps
All values from NFL Combine

=== Los Angeles Rams ===
Young was selected by the Los Angeles Rams in the sixth round with the 205th overall pick in the 2018 NFL draft. He was waived by the Rams on November 5, 2018, and was re-signed to the practice squad. He was promoted to the active roster on December 11, 2018. He played 2 games in 2018 and recorded one fumble recovery.

Young was waived/injured during final roster cuts on August 31, 2019, and reverted to the team's injured reserve list the next day. He was waived from injured reserve with an injury settlement on September 10.

=== Cleveland Browns ===
Young was signed to the Cleveland Browns' practice squad on December 3, 2019. The Browns signed Young to their reserve/futures list on December 30, 2019. He was waived/injured by the team on July 28, 2020, and subsequently reverted to the team's injured reserve list after clearing waivers the next day. He was waived after the season on March 26, 2021.

=== Ottawa Redblacks ===
On March 31, 2022, Young signed with the Ottawa Redblacks of the Canadian Football League (CFL). He was released by the Redblacks on May 15, 2022, just before the start of training camp.

=== Massachusetts Pirates ===
On January 30, 2023, Young signed with the Massachusetts Pirates of the Indoor Football League (IFL). He was released on July 17, 2023.
