= Des Moines Independent Community School District =

School district in Iowa

Des Moines Public Schools

Location
- Des Moines, Iowa Midwest United States

District information
- Type: Public
- Motto: Think. Learn. Grow.
- Grades: PK-12
- Established: May 21, 1907
- Superintendent: Matt Smith
- Accreditations: North Central Association of Secondary Schools and Colleges; The Iowa Department of Education
- Schools: 65
- Budget: $590,375,000 (2020–21)

Students and staff
- Students: 33,739 (2022–23)
- Teachers: 2,077.70FTE
- Staff: 873.74 FTE
- Student–teacher ratio: 14.79
- Athletic conference: Iowa Alliance

Other information
- Website: http://www.dmschools.org/

The Des Moines Independent Community School District (The Des Moines Public Schools, or DMPS) is the largest public school district in Iowa. It is accredited by the North Central Association of Secondary Schools and Colleges and the Iowa Department of Education.

== Area ==
The district currently serves most of the city of Des Moines as well as parts of suburban Pleasant Hill and Windsor Heights. The city is split into four different area districts. District one covers the west, two covers the north, three covers the east, and district four the south.

== History ==
Advanced Placement Program and International Baccalaureate Programme

In 2008, Des Moines Public Schools became the first school district in Iowa to offer the International Baccalaureate (IB) Programme.

Between the 2018-2019 school year and the 2024, the student enrollment levels went down about 2,500.

On January 9, 2023. Des Moines Public Schools was hit with a cybersecurity attack.

On September 26, 2025, Immigration and Customs Enforcement (ICE) reported that superintendent Ian Roberts had been detained in Des Moines, Iowa, and stated that a "final order of removal" had been issued for Roberts's deportation in May 2024. Roberts reportedly fled from a traffic stop, then abandoned his school-issued vehicle. At the time of his arrest, ICE said that he was found in possession of a loaded handgun, $3,000 in cash, and a fixed blade hunting knife. Jackie Norris, Chair of the School Board made a statement placing Roberts on paid administrative leave pending further investigation appointing Matt Smith as interim Superintendent.

== Schools ==
In addition to traditional neighborhood schools, the district has various neighborhood schools with programs such as the IB Programme, Turn Around Arts, and more. The district also offers many special schools and program such as Central Campus, Central Academy, Options Academy, Ruby Van Meter and Focus.

=== High schools (Grades 9-12) ===
- East High School — serving students located in the east segment
- Hoover High School — serving students located in the northwest segment
- Lincoln High School — serving students located in the south segment
- North High School — serving students located in the north segment
- Roosevelt High School - Serving students located in the west segment
- Virtual Campus High School — Online

=== Special schools & programs ===
- Ruby Van Meter School - A special education school serving disabled students with high support needs.
- Central Academy (Est. 1985) - A magnet school located in downtown Des Moines.
- Central Campus - A magnet program serving high school students throughout Iowa with 9 career academies.
  - Business Academy
  - Information Technology & Arts Academy
  - Engineering Academy
  - Human Service Academy
  - Health Sciences Academy
  - Skill Trades Academy
  - Technology & Systems Integration Academy
  - Transportation Academy
- Academic Pathways - A set of three programs designed for both adults and current high schoolers who need a new path to earning a high school diploma
- Orchard Place School - A Psychiatric Medical Institute for Children ages 10–18. The largest PMIC in Iowa

=== Middle schools (grades 6-8) ===
- Brody Middle School
- Callanan Middle School
- Cowles Montessori School
- Goodrell Middle School
- Harding Middle School
- Hiatt Middle School
- Hoyt Middle School
- McCombs Middle School
- Meredith Middle School
- Merrill Middle School
- Weeks Middle School
- Virtual Campus Middle School

=== Elementary schools (K-5, PK-5, K-6) ===
- Brubaker Elementary School
- Capitol View Elementary School
- Carver Community School (est. 2007)
- Cattell Elementary School
- Cowles Montessori Elementary School
- Downtown School
- Edmunds Elementary School
- Findley Elementary school
- Garton Elementary School
- Greenwood Elementary School
- Hanawalt Elementary School
- Hillis Elementary School
- Howe Elementary School
- Hubbell Elementary School
- Jackson Elementary School
- Jefferson Elementary Traditional School
- King Elementary School
- Lovejoy Elementary School
- Madison Elementary School
- McKinley Elementary School
- Monroe Elementary School
- Moore Elementary School
- Morris Elementary School
- Moulton Extended Learning Center
- Oak Park Elementary School
- Park Avenue Elementary School
- Perkins Elementary School
- Phillips Elementary School
- Pleasant Hill Elementary School
- River Woods Elementary School
- Samuelson Elementary School
- Smouse Elementary School
- South Union Elementary School
- Stowe Elementary School
- Studebaker Elementary School
- Willard Elementary School
- Windsor Elementary School
- Wright Elementary School

=== Pre-Schools ===
- McKee Education Center
- Mitchell Early Learning Center
- Jesse Franklin Taylor Education Center
- Woodlawn Education Center

== Media ==
- DMPS-TV Channel 12 is the school district's Educational-access television cable TV channel, which is provided through Mediacom Cable Television as part of a franchise agreement with the City of Des Moines. The district televises their school board meetings through this network. Additionally, the school district operates its own social media outlets.

== Facts and figures ==
=== Enrollment ===
View source data.

Year	District-wide	High schools	Middle schools	Elementary schools	Other programs & adjustments
2006-2007	31,221	8,808	6,405	14,369	1,639
2005-2006	31,599	8,570	6,610	14,249	2,170
2004-2005	31,851	8,620	6,876	14,384	1,971
2003-2004	32,150	8,430	7,115	14,497	2,108
2002-2003	32,464	8,696	7,103	14,733	1,932
2001-2002	35,399	10,114	5,504	19,541	240
2000-2001	34,776	9,773	8,116	16,699	188

- Note: The table rows shown in red represents data that was cited directly from the Des Moines Public Schools enrollment reports. Some of this data conflicts with data from the Iowa Department of Education annual reports. This is because the underlying data is complex, and the table above is a summary of the data collected from the two sources.

== See also ==
- Lists of school districts in the United States
- List of school districts in Iowa
- Tinker v. Des Moines
