= Peewee Jarrett =

American football player (born 1999)

No. 14
- Position: Quarterback

Personal information
- Born: October 12, 1999 (age 27)
- Listed height: 6 ft 5 in (1.96 m)
- Listed weight: 240 lb (109 kg)

Career information
- High school: Herbert Hoover (Des Moines, Iowa)
- College: Ellsworth (2018); Iowa Central (2021); West Florida (2022–2023)
- NFL draft: 2024: undrafted

Career history
- New York Jets (2024)*; Tucson Sugar Skulls (2025)*
- * Offseason or practice squad member only

Byron "Peewee" Jarrett Jr. (born October 12, 1999) is an American former professional football quarterback. He played college football for the Ellsworth Panthers, Iowa Central Tritons, and West Florida Argonauts.

== Early life ==
Jarrett grew up in Des Moines, Iowa. He attended Herbert Hoover High School in Des Moines, throwing for 2,364 passing yards and 18 touchdowns as a junior and then 2,710 yards (second-best in Iowa) and 23 touchdowns as a senior. He ended his high school career having thrown for over 5,000 yards and over 50 touchdowns, which included breaking the single-game Hoover passing yards record with 547. However, his team won only five games across his last two years and he had no offers to play NCAA college football.

== College career ==
Jarrett was ultimately able to enroll at Ellsworth Community College in 2018, where he appeared in seven games before missing the rest of the year due to injury. He then moved away to be closer to his sick grandmother, who died in February 2019. He underwent two shoulder surgeries and did not play in the 2019 season.

Jarrett joined Iowa Central Community College in 2020, but the season was pushed to spring 2021 due to the COVID-19 pandemic. He said that, having not seen any playing time in over two years, "I was so set on quitting football." After discussing with the team's head coach and with his father, Jarrett ultimately decided to continue his football career. He played two seasons for the team – in both the spring and fall 2021 seasons – and totaled over 3,500 passing yards and 42 passing touchdowns, also rushing for close to 600 yards in the second season with 13 rushing touchdowns. He was chosen a first-team National Junior College Athletic Association (NJCAA) All-America selection.

Having received attention from larger schools following his play at the NJCAA level, Jarrett committed to play for the NCAA Division I FCS Western Illinois Leathernecks, but decided to transfer to the Division II West Florida Argonauts after only one semester. He won the starting job at West Florida, succeeding Austin Reed, and completed 165 passes for 2,719 yards and 33 touchdowns, throwing for a touchdown in all of the team's 14 games while leading them to 12 wins – second-best in program history – and an appearance in the semifinals of the Division II playoffs.

In 2023, Jarrett threw for 2,989 yards and 32 touchdowns while running for 372 yards and three touchdowns. He became the first player in school history to throw for over 5,000 yards with over 1,000 rushing yards. He declared for the NFL draft after the season.

== Professional career ==
Pre-draft measurables
Height	Weight	Arm length	Hand span
6 ft 3 in (1.91 m)	221 lb (100 kg)	32 1/2 in (0.83 m)	10 1/4 in (0.26 m)
All values from Pro Day

=== New York Jets ===
After going unselected in the 2024 NFL draft, Jarrett was signed by the New York Jets as an undrafted free agent. He was waived by the Jets on May 6, after the team signed Andrew Peasley and Colby Suits.

=== Tucson Sugar Skulls ===
On October 14, 2024, Jarrett signed with the Tucson Sugar Skulls of the Indoor Football League for the 2025 season. On April 11, 2025, Jarrett announced that he had undergone a sixth career surgery, and would consequently be retiring from professional football.
