= Pauline Brown Humphrey =

American cosmetologist (1906–1993)

Pauline Brown Humphrey'
- Born: 1906; Des Moines, Iowa, U.S.
- Died: March 1993 (aged 86–87)
- Education: University of Iowa
- Occupation: Cosmetologist

Pauline Brown Humphrey (née Pauline Robinson, also called Pauline Robinson-Brown; 1906 – March 1993) was an American cosmetologist who started a cosmetology school, a beauty product line, a beauty store chain, and a Women's Army Corps African American beauty shop in Iowa. She sponsored programs that helped students learn cosmetology, and her students worked in beauty shops around the United States.

== Early life and education ==
Humphrey was born in 1906 in Des Moines, Iowa, as Myrise Pauline Robinson to Myrise and Eliza Robinson. She did not know her father due to her parents having a divorce when she was younger. Her grandparents, Julia and Frank Diggs, raised her and her mother visited her at the grandparents' home. Due to her grandparents being busy with work, Humphrey started school when she was four years old. In 1922, Humphrey graduated from East High School and attended the University of Iowa to study physical education. She stopped attending class when her grandparents became unable to pay for her tuition. Humphrey married William Brown and wanted to attend cosmetology school after they divorced. No Iowa schools would accept her due to her being African American, leading her to move to Chicago, Illinois with her daughter Barbara. Humphrey attended a cosmetology school that was operated by Madam C. J. Walker from 1934 to 1935. Walker taught Humphrey how to help the beauty of African American women, including techniques for hair.

== Career ==
Humphrey returned to Des Moines in 1936 and started a beauty shop to put aside money to start a school. She attended the Fort Dodge Beauty Academy for nine months and worked on the beauty of black and white women. A white woman was unhappy with how her hair was styled during Humphrey's final exam, but the examiners still certified her as a teacher. She founded the Crescent School of Beauty Culture in Des Moines on February 2, 1939. Humphrey had issues with starting a business due to her race and gender, but she became one of a few women to distribute beauty products in Iowa for both women and men. She started an Iowa line of beauty products that included lipstick, mascara, and cologne, among others. Humphrey was the first African American woman cosmetology school owner in Iowa and the first such certified cosmetology teacher in the state.

Humphrey was a sponsor of "Copper Colored Review" and the "Bronze Spotlight," along with other African American salon owners, to teach students how to style hair, do manicures, and other beauty techniques. Her students worked at salons around the United States. Humphrey founded a beauty shop chain in Iowa. In 1944, she married Major Humphrey, who helped her run her business. Humphrey opened a beauty shop for African American women in the Women's Army Corps in 1943 in Fort Des Moines. After her school closed in 1985 due to the land being taken over by the city, Humphrey's health began to worsen, and her business closed.

== Death ==
She died in March 1993. In a 1990s interview, Humphrey's daughter Barbara Brown James said, "The biggest thing she wanted to do with me was to make sure that I was an independent woman, who could take care of myself, who was educated, and who was able to make a life for myself." From her mother, Barbara had the idea of, "Enjoy it, and savor it, and push yourself to make things better for other people."
