= Iowa Alliance Conference =

Iowa High School Athletic Conference

- Conference: IHSAA / IGHSAU
- Founded: 2022
- Sports fielded: 21
- No. of teams: 9
- Region: Central Iowa
- Website: https://www.iowaallianceconference.org/

Locations
- Des Moines inset

The Iowa Alliance Conference is a high school athletic conference whose members are mostly located in the metropolitan areas of central Iowa, with five of the schools being from the Des Moines Independent Community School District.

The conference schools are all formerly of the Central Iowa Metro League.

== Member schools ==
Institution	Location	Affiliation	2026-2027 BEDS	Mascot	Colors	Former Conference
Fort Dodge	Fort Dodge	Public	766	Dodgers		CIML
Marshalltown	Marshalltown	Public	1,185	Bobcats		CIML
Mason City	Mason City	Public	689	River Hawks		CIML
East	Des Moines	Public	1,333	Scarlets		CIML
Hoover	Des Moines	Public	617	Huskies		CIML
Lincoln	Des Moines	Public	1,596	Railsplitters		CIML
North	Des Moines	Public	957	Polar Bears		CIML
Ottumwa	Ottumwa	Public	1,027	Bulldogs		CIML
Roosevelt	Des Moines	Public	1,428	Rough Riders		CIML

Co-ops and Shared Sports
School	Sport Shared	Co-opting Schools
DM East	Girls Soccer	Saydel
DM Hoover	Boys Wrestling	DM North
DM North	Boys Wrestling	DM Hoover
Fort Dodge	Boys Soccer	Southeast Valley, St. Edmond Catholic, Manson-Northwest Webster
Fort Dodge	Boys Tennis	Southeast Valley
Fort Dodge	Girls Soccer	Southeast Valley, St. Edmond Catholic, Manson-Northwest Webster
Marshalltown	Boys Tennis	West Marshall, East Marshall, Nevada, BCLUW
Mason City	Baseball, Boys Soccer	North Iowa Christian School
Mason City	Boys Tennis	West Fork
Mason City	Girls Soccer	Central Springs, Newman Catholic, North Iowa Christian School, Osage, Rockford
Ottumwa	Baseball, Boys XC, Football, Boys Tennis	Ottumwa Christian
Ottumwa	Boys Soccer	Davis County

== History ==
On March 1, 2021, ten high schools made the announcement to leave the Central Iowa Metro League (CIML) and form a new conference. These schools include Ames, Fort Dodge, Marshalltown, Mason City, and Ottumwa, as well as the five public Des Moines schools (East, Hoover, Lincoln, North, and Roosevelt). The schools left the CIML in the spring of 2021 to create a new conference. The withdrawal is due to a low percentage in wins from the non-suburban schools in the conference. The new conference was announced on November 19, 2021, and included Waterloo East High School, joining from the Mississippi Valley Conference (Iowa).

Due to the size of the schools and proximity, games will still be routinely scheduled with the remaining members of the CIML, while allowing scheduling with other schools they did not have space in their schedule for.

Mason City dropped the mascot "Mohawks" in November 2021, citing an effort to rid the district of a symbol that exploited Native American tribal imagery. The Meskwaki and Akwesasne Nations had voiced objections to the mascot. On March 22, 2022, it was revealed the new mascot for Mason City would be the "River Hawks". The name was chosen by vote over "Majors" and "Monarchs", which were narrowed down from over 300 submissions.

On November 20, 2023, Waterloo Community School District announced a proposal to combine East High and West High into a single high school, citing stagnant to declining enrollment, rising costs, and an imbalance between the two schools. It was put to a vote to the community, passing on November 5, 2024. On October 8, 2025, the identity of the new high school was announced as Waterloo United High School. The mascot would be the Titans, and the colors would be obsidian black, victory gold, foundry gray, and blizzard white. The school is scheduled to be completed with construction and open for students at the beginning of the 2028 school year, however the athletic teams will begin competing under the new school in 2026. Waterloo United will play initially in the Mississippi Valley Conference, taking the place of Waterloo West. Once the physical school opens, the school district has laid the possibility of relocating to a difference conference.

On April 21, 2025, Ames announced its withdrawal from the Iowa Alliance Conference. Ames will join the Little Hawkeye conference beginning with the 2026–27 school year.

== Sports ==
The conference offers the following sports:

- Fall — volleyball, boys' cross-country, girls' cross-country, boys' golf and girls' swimming.
- Winter — Boys' basketball, girls' basketball, bowling, wrestling and boys' swimming.
- Spring — Boys' track and field, girls' track and field, boys' soccer, girls' soccer, boys' tennis, girls' tennis and girls' golf.
- Summer — Baseball and softball.

All the member schools field a varsity football team, however it is not sponsored by any conference in Iowa. Football is played in a separate classification system, and competition is organized by districts.

Although the member schools field freshman — and in some cases, junior varsity — teams in many of the above-mentioned sports, conference championships are determined at sophomore and varsity levels only.
