= Theodore Roosevelt High School (Iowa) =

Public secondary school in Des Moines, Iowa, United States

Theodore Roosevelt High School

Location
- 4419 Center Street; Des Moines, Iowa 50312; USA; 41.592606°N 93.679309°W

Information
- Type: Public Secondary
- Established: 1923
- School district: Des Moines Independent Community School District
- Principal: Mindy Euken
- Staff: 66.80 (FTE)
- Grades: 9–12
- Enrollment: 2,039 (2023-2024)
- Student to teacher ratio: 30.52
- Campus: Urban (Des Moines)
- Colors: Navy Blue and White
- Athletics conference: Iowa Alliance Conference
- Nickname: Roughriders
- Rival: East Scarlets; Hoover Huskies; Lincoln Rail Splitters
- Newspaper: Rider Roundup
- Website: Des Moines Roosevelt

Theodore Roosevelt High School, usually referred to simply as Roosevelt High School or TRHS, is a public secondary school located on the west side of Des Moines, Iowa. It is one of five secondary schools in the Des Moines Independent Community School District, and was named after the 26th President of the United States, Theodore Roosevelt.

== History ==
The construction of the building in which TRHS is housed was initiated in 1922 by Proudfoot, Bird, and Rawson and opened in 1924 with 1,282 students. The final cost to build was $1,331,600. The building's design has won many awards and is considered one of 50 most significant buildings in the state by Iowa PBS. The building is on both the State and National Register of Historic Places.

== Curriculum ==
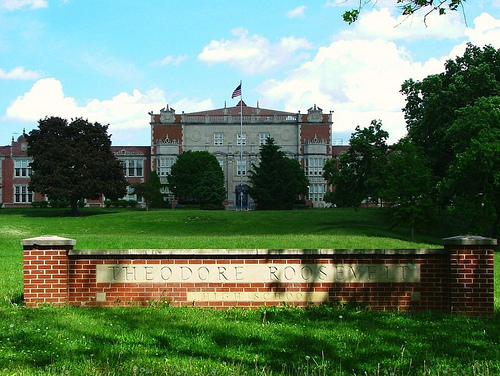
Roosevelt High School

Students must be enrolled in physical education at least one semester each year and complete CPR certification. They are also required to take core academic courses in order to graduate and receive a diploma. These include Social Studies, English, Mathematics, Science, and Art.

== Visual and Performing Arts ==
Roosevelt offers a range of visual and performing arts programming, including 2D & 3D design, painting and drawing, band, orchestra, theater, choir, and AP Music Theory.

=== Bands ===
- Marching Band
- Jazz Band I
- Jazz Band II
- Symphonic Band (beginning)
- Wind Ensemble (advanced)
- Wind Symphony (intermediate)

=== Orchestras ===
- Orchestra (beginning-intermediate)
- Honors Orchestra/Chamber Orchestra (advanced)

=== Vocal Music Choirs ===
- Bridges 2 Harmony Gospel Choir
- Chamber Choir
- Da capo Vocal Jazz
- Forte Treble Choir
- Revelation Varsity Show Choir
- Rider Rhythm Junior Varsity Show Choir
- Riderchor Bass Clef Choir

== Athletics and activities ==
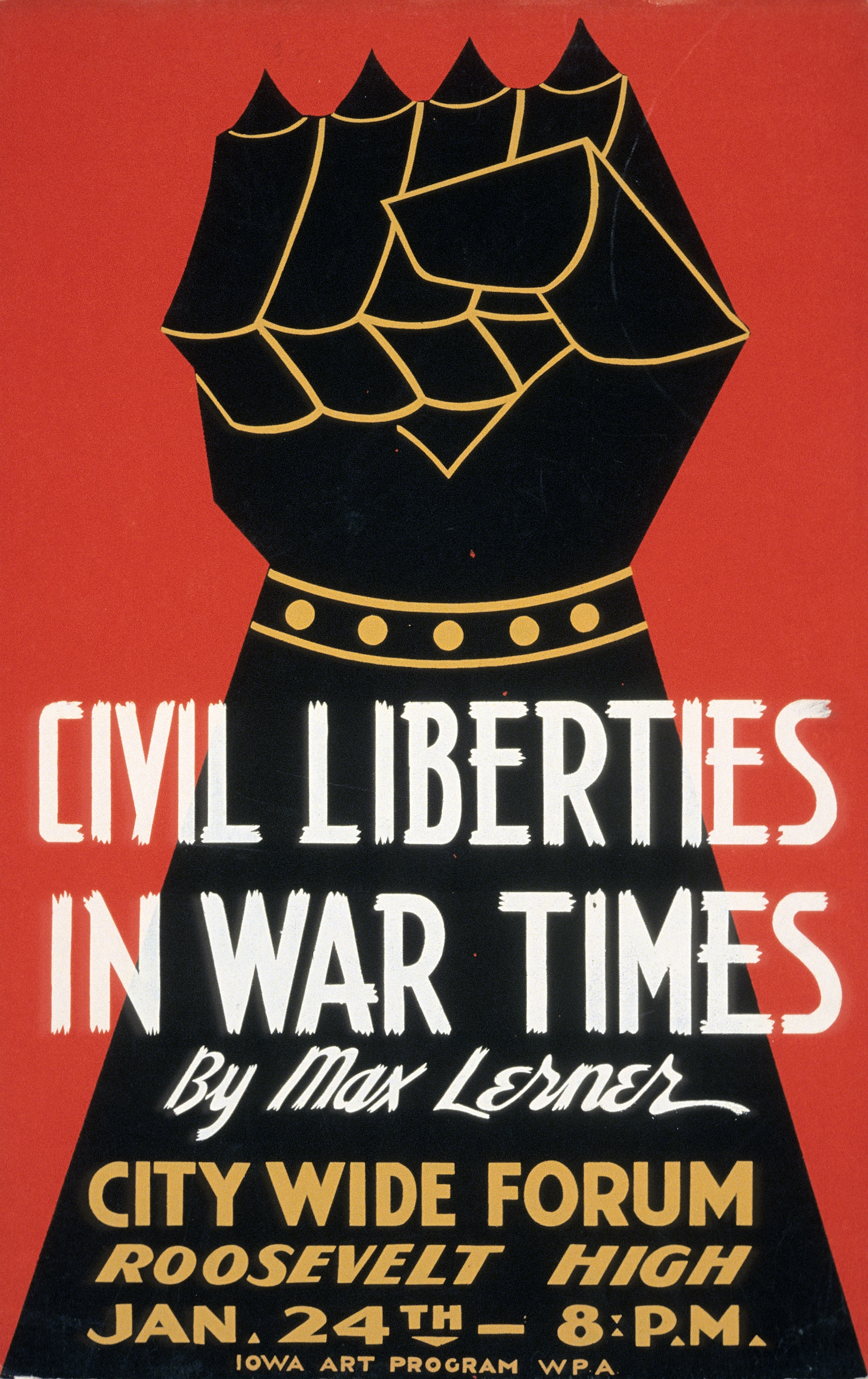
WPA poster for a citywide forum lecture at Roosevelt High School by journalist Max Lerner (1940)

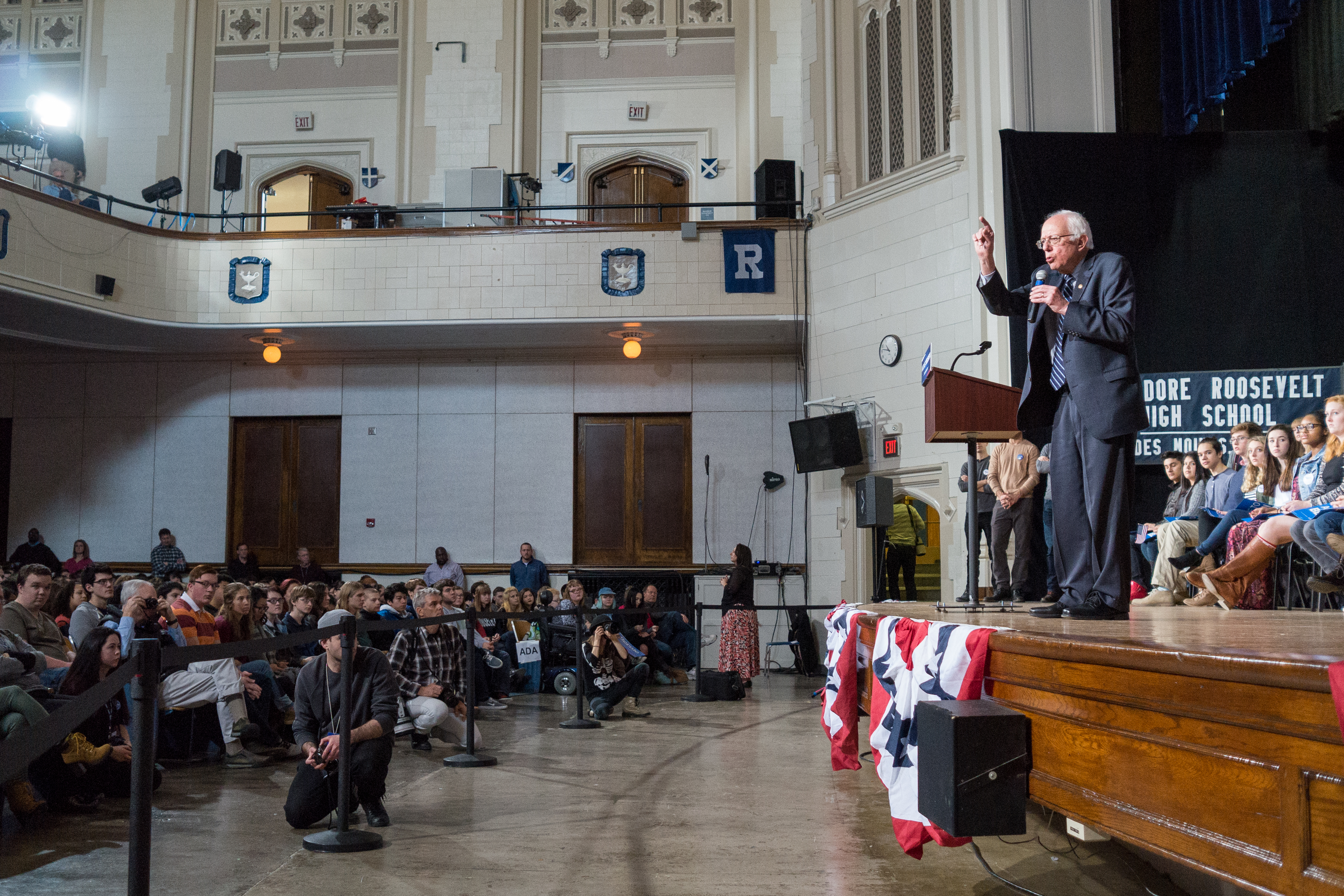
US Senator and Presidential candidate Bernie Sanders speaking at Roosevelt High School (January 2016)

Roosevelt competes as a school in the Iowa High School Athletic Association 4A school. The Roughriders are members of the Iowa Alliance Conference, and participate in the following sports:

- Fall
  - Football
  - Volleyball
  - Cross Country
    - Boys' 3-time State Champions (2001, 2002, 2003)
  - Boys' golf
    - 16-time State Champions (1929, 1930, 1931, 1932, 1933, 1934, 1936, 1938, 1939, 1940, 1940(F), 1941, 1941(F), 1946, 1947, 1967)
  - Girls' swimming
    - 4-time State Champions (1966, 1972, 1973, 1980)
- Winter
  - Basketball
    - Boys' 3-time State Champions (1932, 1965, 1978)
    - Girls' 2006 Class 4A State Champions
  - Bowling
  - Wrestling
  - Boys' swimming
    - 12-time State Champions (1939, 1940, 1943, 1944, 1945, 1948, 1950, 1951, 1952, 1953, 1959, 1963)
- Spring —
  - Track and field
    - Boys' 2-time state Champions (1946, 1999)
  - Soccer
  - Tennis
    - Boys' 3-time State Champions (2000, 2002, 2009)
  - Girls' golf
- Summer
  - Baseball
  - Softball

== Notable alumni ==
- Barry Ackerley, former owner Seattle SuperSonics
- Margaret Allen, first woman to perform a heart transplant
- Inez Asher, novelist and television writer
- Sean Bagniewski, member of the Iowa House of Representatives
- Bill Bryson, best-selling author; inducted in school's Hall of Fame in 2001
- Randy Duncan, runner-up for Heisman Trophy, first pick of 1959 NFL draft
- Larry Ely, NFL player
- Ann B. Friedman, founder of Planet Word, a museum of language arts
- Everett Gendler (class of 1946), rabbi known as the "father of Jewish environmentalism"
- Hoot Gibson, former professional basketball player
- Nate Green, NBA referee, former professional basketball player
- John P. Hayes, artist
- Robert Helmick, president of the United States Olympic Committee
- David Anthony Higgins, actor and comedy writer
- Young Fyre, record producer
- Steve Higgins, announcer, The Tonight Show with Jimmy Fallon
- Lolo Jones (class of 2000), Summer and Winter Olympian, track-and-field and bobsled athlete
- Natasha Kaiser-Brown, sprinter, Olympic silver medalist and relay world champion
- Ruth Kobart, singer
- Cloris Leachman, Emmy and Academy Award-winning actress; 1987 Roosevelt Hall of Fame inductee
- Patricia Schroeder (class of 1958), member of US House of Representatives
- Jane Skiles O'Dea, naval aviator, flight instructor and commander; TRHS Hall of Fame
- Paul Schell, architect, commissioner, dean of University of Washington College of Architecture and Urban Planning, former mayor of Seattle, Washington (1998–2002)
- Bill Stewart (musician), jazz drummer
- Ben Silbermann (class of 1999), co-founder of Pinterest
- Olan Soule (class of 1928), character actor in films, radio, TV and commercials
- Robert D. Ray, Governor of Iowa 1969-83
- George W. Webber (1920–2010), president of New York Theological Seminary
- Feng Zhang (class of 2000), neurobiologist, co-inventor of optogenetics, developer of the CRISPR/Cas9 gene editing method

== See also ==
- Des Moines Independent Community School District for other schools in the same district.
- List of high schools in Iowa
