= MarTay Jenkins =

American gridiron football player (born 1975)

No. 19, 82
- Positions: Wide receiver, kick returner

Personal information
- Born: February 28, 1975 (age 51); Waterloo, Iowa, U.S.
- Listed height: 6 ft 0 in (1.83 m)
- Listed weight: 201 lb (91 kg)

Career information
- High school: North (Des Moines, Iowa)
- College: North Iowa Area; Nebraska–Omaha
- NFL draft: 1999: 6th round, 193rd overall pick

Career history
- Dallas Cowboys (1999)*; Arizona Cardinals (1999–2002); Atlanta Falcons (2003)*; Denver Broncos (2004)*; Arizona Rattlers (2005)*; Calgary Stampeders (2005)
- * Offseason or practice squad member only

Awards and highlights
- NFL kickoff return yards leader (2000); NFL records: Most kickoff return yards in a season: 2,186 (2000); Most kickoff returns in a season: 82 (2000)

Career NFL statistics
- Games played: 40
- Receptions: 70
- Receiving yards: 987
- Receiving touchdowns: 4
- Return yards: 3,866
- Return touchdowns: 2
- Stats at Pro Football Reference
- Stats at CFL.ca (archive)

MarTay Jenkins (born February 28, 1975) is an American former professional football player who was a wide receiver for the Arizona Cardinals of the National Football League (NFL). He also was a member of the Arizona Rattlers in the Arena Football League (AFL) and the Calgary Stampeders in the Canadian Football League (CFL). He played college football for the Nebraska–Omaha Mavericks.

== Early life ==
Jenkins was born in Waterloo, Iowa, and attended Herbert Hoover High School in Des Moines, Iowa as a freshman and sophomore. He then transferred to Des Moines North High School, where he practiced football, basketball and track.

== College career ==
Jenkins attended North Iowa Area Community College. He was part of the 26–24 win against Rochester Community and Technical College in the 1995 RC Cola Bowl.

He transferred to the Division II University of Nebraska Omaha in 1996. As a sophomore, playing in a run-oriented offense, he led the team with 36 receptions for 848 yards, 8 receiving touchdowns (school record), 4 carries for 42 yards (10.5-yard avg.) and one rushing touchdown. Against North Dakota State University, he tallied 166 receiving yards and 3 touchdowns. He was an All-Nebraska NCAA Division II selection by the Omaha World-Herald.

In 1997, he suffered a torn left anterior cruciate ligament in the opening game against the University of Central Missouri, after making a 32-yard touchdown reception, forcing him to miss the rest of the season.

Jenkins returned to complete his senior season in 1998, leading the team with 29 receptions for 540 yards (18.6-yard avg.) and 3 receiving touchdowns, while also posting 10 carries for 171 yards (17.1-yard avg.) and 3 rushing touchdown. He averaged 30.3 yards in 7 kickoff returns. Against North Dakota State University, he had 7 receptions for 147 yards, 2 receiving touchdowns and a 34-yard run. He received All-Nebraska NCAA Division II honors by the Omaha World-Herald.

He finished his college career registering in less than three full seasons, 67 receptions for 1,439 yards (21.5 avg.) and 12 touchdowns. He also returned 24 kickoffs for 597 yards (24.9) and one touchdown, while rushing 14 times for 213 yards and 4 touchdowns. He helped the Mavericks win North Central Conference titles both seasons he played, which were their first league championships in 12 years.

In 2007, he was inducted into the University of Nebraska-Omaha Athletic Hall of Fame. In 2011, he was inducted into the National Junior College Athletic Association Football Hall of Fame.

== Professional career ==
=== National Football League ===
Jenkins was selected by the Dallas Cowboys in the sixth round (193rd overall) of the 1999 NFL draft. He was released on September 5. He was claimed off waivers by the Arizona Cardinals on September 6 and played in 3 games, after being declared inactive in 13 contests.

In 2000, he played in 16 games finishing with an NFL record of 2,186 kickoff return yards. On December 10, Jenkins broke three league records in a 44-10 Cardinals loss to the Jacksonville Jaguars, that included the record for kickoff returns in a season, kickoff return yardage in a season and combined kickoff and punt return yardage in a season.

On September 22, 2002, Jenkins recorded a 65-yard touchdown reception from quarterback Jake Plummer, which allowed Plummer to surpass 15,000 yards passing for his career. On November 3, he suffered a fractured scapula. On November 5, he was placed on the injured reserve list.

Jenkins was released in 2003, after asking for a contract similar to the $3 million-a-year contract that San Diego Chargers wide receiver/kick returner Tim Dwight had signed the year prior. On March 21, it was reported that the Houston Texans offered Jenkins a contract. One week later, Jenkins was signed to a contract with the Atlanta Falcons on March 28. He was released by the Falcons on August 30. On September 11, he was re-signed by the Cardinals, however, he failed a team physical nullifying the contract. On December 30, Jenkins was signed to a futures contract by the Denver Broncos, reuniting with quarterback Jake Plummer. He was released on July 27, 2004.

=== Arena Football League ===
On October 21, 2004, Jenkins signed with the Arizona Rattlers of the Arena Football League. He was released on January 21, 2005.

=== Canadian Football League ===
On March 2, 2005, he signed with the Calgary Stampeders of the Canadian Football League. For the season, he recorded 25 receptions for 382 yards and 4 touchdowns.

== Personal life ==
Jenkins was the Founder, CEO/President of Stand Out Sports an athletic training company in Arizona. He married Camille Jenkins in 2006.
