= Ian Roberts (educator) =

Guyanese athletics competitor and former Iowa school superintendent

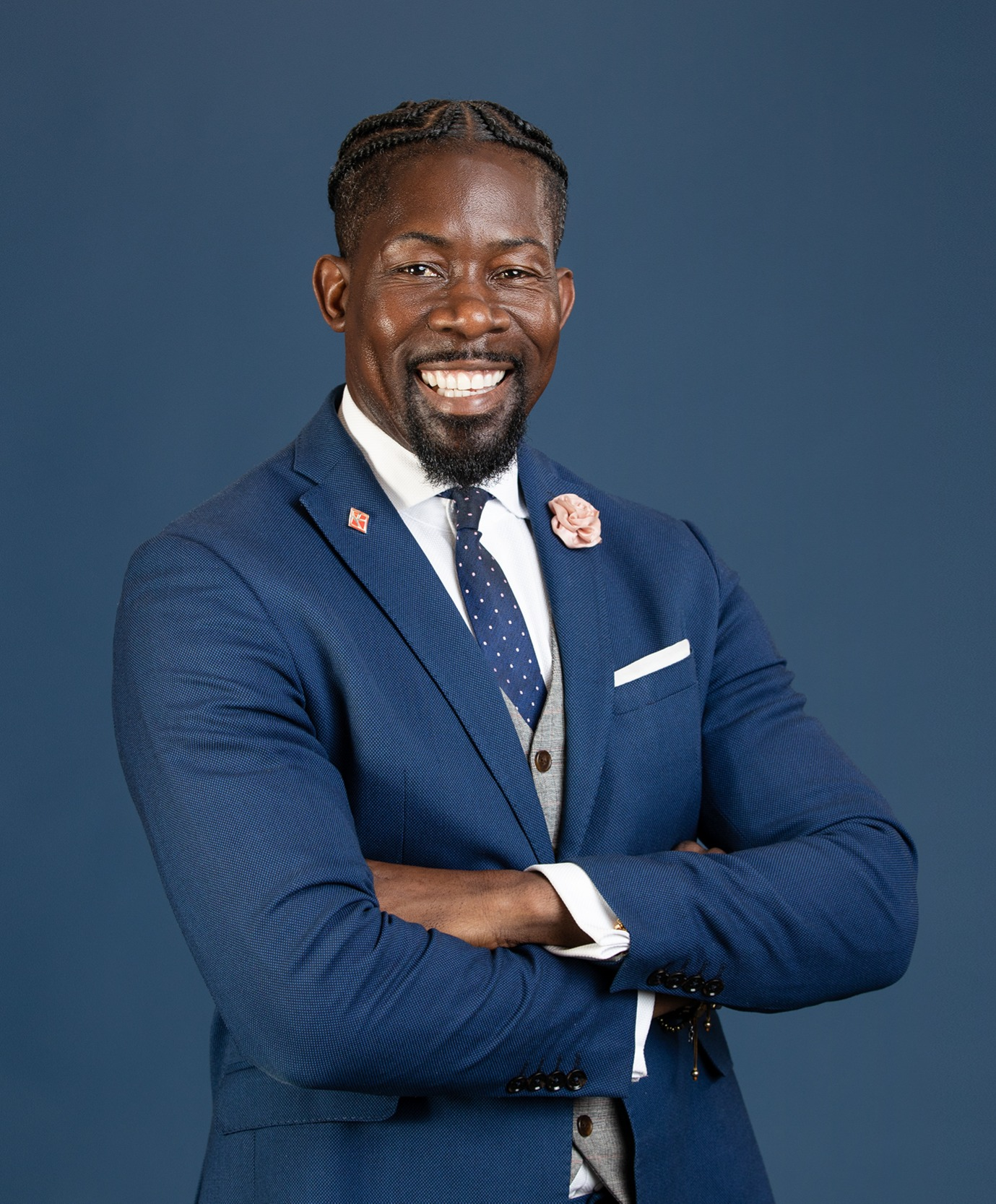
- Roberts in 2023

Personal information
- Nationality: Guyana
- Born: Georgetown, Guyana

Sport
- Sport: Track and field

Achievements and titles
- Personal best: 800 m: 1:46.85
Medal record
Men's athletics
Representing Guyana
Central American and Caribbean Championships
Gold medal – first place	1999 Bridgetown	800 m

Ian Andre Roberts is a retired athlete and former school administrator who was system superintendent for Des Moines Independent Community School District. Roberts ran for Guyana in the 2000 Olympics.

In 2025, Roberts was detained by United States Immigration and Customs Enforcement, who stated that they acted on an order of removal issued in 2024. The Department of Homeland Security further termed him a "criminal alien" and a public safety threat. His detention spurred a protest outside the Des Moines federal courthouse, garnering national and international media attention. In 2026, Roberts pleaded guilty for false statement and firearm charges.

== Early life and education ==
Roberts was born December 18 in Georgetown, Guyana the youngest in the family. His birth year is unclear: there are official documents that he was born in 1970 in Guyana, the same year given on the International Olympic Committee website as of 2025, a 1973 birth year on an unofficial olympics website under the name Andre Ian Roberts with the New York Times reporting that the 1973 year had been used at the Olympics. Entering the US on a visitor visa in 1994, he played soccer at Brooklyn's St. Francis College. He attended Coppin State University in Baltimore, Maryland, and received his bachelor's degree in 1998.

In 2000, Roberts earned a master's degree from St. John's University. He claimed on his resume and profile that he earned a second master's degree from the McDonough School of Business at Georgetown University, but Georgetown stated that they had no record of his attendance. From 2002 to 2007, he attended a doctoral program at Morgan State University without receiving a degree. Later reporting cast doubt on the veracity of several of his claimed qualifications, including his assertion of attending an executive MBA program at the MIT Sloan School of Management, which was denied by MIT.

== Career ==
=== Athletics ===
As a male middle distance runner from Guyana, Roberts specialized in the 800 metres dash. Roberts won his first international medal—a gold in the 800 metres—at the 1999 Central American and Caribbean Championships in Athletics in Bridgetown, Barbados. His winning time of 1:46:85 was a personal best. He competed in the Mid-Eastern Athletic Conference, where he won several conference titles and placed seventh in the 800 metres at the NCAA Championships.

Roberts went on to St. John's University, where he competed in the Big East Conference, winning several championships. He competed in the NCAA finals in 1999.

After winning conference titles in both Division 1 Conferences, Roberts competed internationally. He competed in the 1999 IAAF World Indoor Championships in Maebashi, Japan, but failed to advance past the quarter-finals. He competed in the outdoor 1999 IAAF World Championships in Seville, Spain, but failed to advance past the quarter-finals. He competed in the 2000 Summer Olympics in Sydney, Australia, during which he came in next-to-last place in a preliminary heat.

=== Education ===
From August 2002 to June 2010, Roberts worked in Maryland for the Baltimore City Public Schools as a teacher for 5 years, resident principal for 1 year, then as Principal of Friendship Academy of Science and Technology High School Canton from 2008 to 2010. In 2012, Roberts was the principal of Anacostia High School, a then-all-Black school in Washington, DC. From 2015 to 2018, Roberts worked in Missouri for the St. Louis Public Schools including as Network Superintendent of high schools from June 1, 2016 to 2018. From 2018 to 2020, Roberts was Chief Schools Officer for Aspire Public Schools in Oakland, California. From 2020 to 2023, Roberts was the superintendent of the Millcreek Township School District in Millcreek Township, Erie County, Pennsylvania.

July 1, 2023, Roberts became the superintendent of the Des Moines Independent Community School District in Des Moines, Iowa, a position he held until his resignation on September 30, 2025. In his application, Roberts falsely claimed that he had earned a doctorate from Morgan State University. During the hiring process, the school board uncovered this misrepresentation but still decided to select him for the position.

Earlier in the month preceding his September 2025 arrest, Roberts was interviewed about the Reimagining Education initiative, a ballot initiative for a bond measure to fund various program investments in Des Moines Public Schools.

== Legal issues ==
Immigration and Customs Enforcement (ICE) reported the following three charges attributed to Ian Roberts:

- July 3, 1996: Charges for criminal possession of narcotics with intent to sell, criminal possession of narcotics, criminal possession of a forgery instrument and possession of a forged instrument in New York.
- Nov. 1, 2012: A conviction for reckless driving, unsafe operation and speeding in Maryland.
- Feb. 3, 2020: Charges for second-degree criminal possession of a weapon (having a loaded firearm outside his home or business); third-degree criminal possession of a weapon (an ammunition feeding device); and fourth-degree weapon charges. A document from Feb. 4, 2020, indicates that the second-degree criminal possession charge was inchoate.

In January 2022, Roberts pled guilty and paid a fine of $100 and $94.42 in court costs for having had a loaded gun in his vehicle during a Pennsylvania deer-hunting trip the previous month.

On September 26, 2025, Immigration and Customs Enforcement (ICE) reported that Roberts had been detained in Des Moines, Iowa, and stated that a "final order of removal" had been issued for Roberts's deportation in May 2024. According to the Department of Homeland Security, Roberts fled after identifying himself in a targeted enforcement stop, then abandoned his vehicle. At the time of his arrest, ICE said that a loaded handgun, $3,000 in cash, and a fixed-blade hunting knife were found in his vehicle.

A spokesperson for Roberts's school district told the Associated Press following the arrest that they had no knowledge of a 2024 order of removal, and that Roberts had undergone a comprehensive background check, had completed an I-9, and was authorized to work. The school district voted to place Roberts on paid administrative leave as he was unable to perform his duties. Subsequently, the Iowa Board of Educational Examiners revoked Roberts's administrative license, which caused the school district to be legally required to place him on unpaid leave retroactive to the original leave decision. By September 30, 2025, the school district stated that they had received a copy of the order of removal.

On September 30, 2025, Roberts's attorney filed a request with the federal immigration court in Omaha, Nebraska, asking for his deportation proceedings to be put on hold. Roberts resigned the same day, saying he did not want to be a distraction to the district's education efforts.

Also on September 30, 2025, the Des Moines Public School (DPMS) Board chairman read a statement into the public record, indicating that Roberts had provided a driver's license and a social security card as proof of citizenship in his application in 2023. The statement also acknowledged the school board had been contacted by ICE in the time since Roberts's arrest, with ICE notifying the board that Roberts was not eligible to work in the U.S. According to the statement read by the DMPS chairperson, the school board attempted to provide Roberts with an opportunity to clarify the circumstances via a questionnaire, communicated to Roberts's attorney. Roberts did not return the questionnaire and instead submitted a resignation letter, which his attorney conveyed to the DMPS board.

On October 2, 2025, federal prosecutors filed a felony charge against Roberts of "Illegal alien in possession of firearms" 18 U.S.C. § 922(g)(5). Roberts was also transferred to federal custody and appeared before a United States magistrate judge in the United States District Court for the Southern District of Iowa.

On January 22, 2026, U.S. Attorney's Office, Southern District of Iowa reported Ian Andre Roberts, 55, entered guilty pleas to False Statement for Employment and Illegal Alien in Possession of a Firearm. Roberts is scheduled to be sentenced on May 29, 2026, and faces a potential sentence of up to 15 years in prison on the firearms charge and up to five years in prison on the false statements charge. A federal district court judge will determine any sentence after considering the United States Sentencing Guidelines and other statutory factors.
