= Iowa High School Speech Association =

The Iowa High School Speech Association (IHSSA) consists of member high schools from four districts in Iowa, United States, and offers three categories of competition: debate, large group, and individual events. At the end of each of the three contests, the Cooley Sweepstakes Trophy is awarded. To get to the all-state speech tournament, one must first proceed from the district and state tournaments. At Districts for speech, there is one judge (except for One Act Play, which has 3 judges) who issues ratings and every team or individual who receives a "I" goes on. At State (there are four "state" tournaments) there are three judges, and two out of three must not only give a "I" rating, but also give a recommendation.

== Tournaments ==
The State Debate Tournament is typically held the first weekend of January each year. Schools are only allowed to enter a certain number of debaters in each category, aimed at getting the best debaters from Iowa to the tournament. Events include Student Congress and Lincoln-Douglas Debate, as well as others. The IHSSA uses the same rules and resolutions as the National Forensic League when hosting these events.

District tournaments are held for both large group and individual events separately.

State tournaments are also held separately for large group and individual events. There are four state tournaments in Iowa.

The All-State Festival is actually not a tournament because there are no judges or superior tournaments to compete for. Instead, the best in each category are showcased at two separate events. Critics give comments instead of ratings given by judges.

== Large group events ==
- One Act Play. A group performs either one act from a longer play, or a whole play consisting of only one act; no limits are placed on cast size and scene changes.
- Readers Theatre. A group performs a presentation of a work, read from a script; There are no props besides chairs.
- Choral Reading. Also known as voice choir, where group members recite a work from a script, whether in unison or not; movements and voice changes are used for effect.
- Ensemble Acting. Any type of acting scene requiring more than one participant. No costuming or props allowed except for chairs and a table.
- Group Mime. A group acts out a scene in silence. Background music (without lyrics) is allowed. Additionally, traditional mime face paint is no longer used in competition as it was deemed racially insensitive.
- Solo Mime. An individual acts a scene in silence, usually to background instrumental music, although this is not required.
- Television News Broadcasting. A video "broadcast" is prepared in advance by a group, and displayed for judging; the video includes sections on news, weather, and even commercials.
- Radio News Broadcasting. A radio "broadcast" is prepared in advance by a group and is played for judging. As with the video-based competition, the "broadcast" includes news, weather reports, and commercials.
- Group Improvisation. A group of 2-6 people choose one topic from a list of three, and are given two minutes to prepare a scene lasting five minutes or less.
- Musical Theater. A group of 2 - 8 students performs a series of selections from a musical play, with background music. This category has a maximum time limit of 10 minutes.
- Short Film. A film under five minutes is prepared in advance of the contest. The film can be of any genre, from comedy to action, as long as it meets the time requirements. This contest can involve as many as fifteen students.

== Individual events ==
- Acting. A one-act play or a segment of a play, book, or other published material, you can write your own piece to act out as well
- Poetry. Speak a poem or poems, either published by an author or self written
- Prose. Speak a section of a book or other published material
- After Dinner Speaking. A speech about anything similar to what would be given after a formal dinner
- Improvisational Acting. A short made-up skit, often humorous. 3 characters and 2 situations are drawn, must include 2 characters and one situation from those drawn
- Radio News Broadcasting. A radio program made up of current news, drawn up and performed by one person (not to be confused with LG radio) that should cover typical news, including a commercial and a news flash.
- Spontaneous Speaking. A short made-up speech concerning important issues. Three topics are drawn and one is chosen.
- Original Oratory. A speech created by the speaker.
- Reviewing. A general review of a book, movie, album, video game, or other published material or product.
- Storytelling. Speaker tells a short story, memorized. Speaker must sit on a stool and pretend to be telling the story to an audience. The story may be a children's story or have an adult content.
- Literary Program. A combination between poetry and prose categories
- Public Address. Speaker gives another persons' speech, such as the "Gettysburg Address" by Abraham Lincoln (however the Address is too short to be given at contest).
- Expository. A "how-to" speech that explains how something works; an explanatory speech.
- Solo Musical Theater. Speaker sings a song and acts it out. The speaker may record his/her voice to the song ahead of time, however the voice and the song must be together.

== See also ==
- National Forensic League
