= Herbert Hoover High School (Iowa) =

Public secondary school in Des Moines, Iowa, United States

Location
- 4800 Aurora Avenue; Des Moines, Iowa 50310; United States; 41.636311°N 93.683443°W

Information
- Type: Public School
- Motto: "Citizenship, Opportunity, Diversity, Excellence"
- Established: 1967
- Oversight: Des Moines Independent Community School District; International Baccalaureate
- Superintendent: Thomas Ahart
- Principal: Qynne Kelly
- Staff: 41.00 (FTE)
- Grades: 9-12
- Enrollment: 923 (2023-2024)
- Student to teacher ratio: 22.51
- Campus: Urban (NW Des Moines)
- Colors: Green and Gold
- Athletics conference: Iowa Alliance Conference
- Mascot: Huskies
- Rivals: Johnston Dragons; North Polar Bears; Roosevelt Roughriders; Urbandale J-Hawks
- Newspaper: Hoover Challenger
- Website: Des Moines Hoover

Herbert Hoover High School, usually referred to simply as Hoover High School or Hoover, is a public secondary school located on the Northwest side of Des Moines, Iowa.

It is one of five secondary schools under the district of the Des Moines Independent Community School District, and was named after Iowa native and the 31st United States president Herbert Hoover. The school's athletic teams are called the Huskies and compete in the Iowa Alliance Conference. In 2017, Hoover High reached half a century of existence.

== Students ==
As of the 2022-23 school year, there were nearly 1,000 students enrolled at Hoover. Hoover has one of the most diverse student bodies of any high school in Iowa, having students that derive from dozens of countries. The secondary school typically has a graduating class of about 200 students a year.

== Faculty ==
Former Iowa governor Chet Culver was an instructor and sports coach at Hoover High School in the 1990s before running for Secretary of State of Iowa. Timm Pilcher is the adviser for the internationally award-winning newspaper, The Challenger, and also performs in the band Faculty Lounge. Morgan King is the current Theater Arts and Play Production instructor. The auditorium was named after former theater teacher Denis Hildreth in 2008, who taught at the school for almost 25 years. In 2003, Hildreth was inducted into the Iowa High School Speech Association Hall of Fame. The current principal is Qynne Kelly. The music director is Randall E. Hoepker, who is also the band director. Under him in the music department is Lisa Fried (orchestra) and Alexander Fitzgerald (choir). The head of the science department is currently Eric Hall, who in 2013 won the Rotary Club of Des Moines Teacher of the Year award for his efforts in the field.

== Extracurricular activities ==
=== Athletics ===
Hoover competes as a school in the Iowa High School Athletic Association 4A school system. It is a member of the Iowa Alliance Conference, along with all four of the other DMPS high schools and Ottumwa High School. Hoover's primary rival is Des Moines Roosevelt. The two schools compete in both academics and athletics alike. However, other rivals include but are not limited to Des Moines North, Johnston High School, and Urbandale High School.

Hoover High School's boys' basketball team was undefeated and won the state championship in the 2005-2006 school year. They also won the sportsmanship award at the conclusion of the tournament.

The school's stadium was built in the mid-'90s and named after former Hoover student, Cara McGrane, who was tragically murdered on November 29, 1992. In 2015, the field was dedicated and named after former athletic director, Dan McClanahan. McClanahan was also inducted into the Iowa Football Coaches Hall of Fame in 1998, and served as Hoover's AD from 1999-2010.

Unlike the rest of the school's sports teams, the girls' swimming team is known as the Marlins; when the school opened in 1967, the team decided they wanted to be different, and the alternate name was born and used to this day.

==== Successes ====
- Boys' Basketball - 2006 Class 4A State Champions
- Boys' Cross Country (2-time State Champions - 1970, 1977)
- Boys’ Soccer-2026 3A State Champions
- Softball (2-time State Champions - 1982, 2018)
- Girls' Swimming (5-time State Champions - 1968, 1969, 1970, 1971, 1983)

==== Notable athletic alumnus ====
Jeremy Hellickson, a starting pitcher for the Washington Nationals baseball team, attended the school from 2001-2005. In 2011, Hellickson won the American League Rookie of the Year Award with 117 strikeouts.

=== Theater ===
Hoover is also known for its theater program, which puts on three plays a year. Several students participate in large group and/or solo Iowa High School Speech Association (IHSSA) in different categories including musical theater, mime, and ensemble acting.

Honor Cords and Silver Cord

Students who graduate in the scholastic top 15 percent of their respective class are awarded a gold honor cord to wear at graduation. Additionally, those who have earned a 4.0 GPA or higher receive a gold honor stole to wear, along with a medallion. A student who completes the minimum set of volunteer hours will be recognized at graduation as well. Those who have volunteered over the course of their high school career are able to wear a silver cord to symbolize time given to their community and people in need.

== Visiting politicians ==
Chet Culver kicked off his campaign for governor at Hoover in both 2006 and 2010.

On January 2, 2008, the 44th president of the United States, Barack Obama visited and gave a speech in Hoover's gymnasium while running for president.

Wednesday, October 1, 2014, long-time governor Terry Branstad signed a proclamation in Hoover's library declaring the month of October as College Application Month in Iowa. The purpose of the proclamation was to make students and their families aware of the importance of completing and submitting college applications early on in the process.

On January 11, 2016, U. S. senator and democratic presidential candidate Bernie Sanders gave a speech and held a Q&A in Hoover's Denis Hildreth auditorium.

== Curriculum ==
Beginning in the 2008-2009 school year, Hoover began block scheduling. Each day includes four blocks approximately 80 minutes in length. This allows for a longer teaching time and also for the students to receive a 45-minute lunch. The days are split into alternating green and gold days, which alternate every other day for a total of eight classes every two days. Many students also attend Central Academy and Central Campus in downtown Des Moines in order to acquire college credit and technical proficiency. In 2014, Hoover became an International Baccalaureate world school, and also consistently ranks within the top 50 in the state of Iowa's AP Index compiled by the University of Iowa. Additionally, Hoover has been awarded a grant from the Governor’s STEM Advisory Council to enhance several programs. In 2015, Hoover was awarded the STEM BEST grant for the South Central region by the Governor’s STEM Advisory Council to further establish educational opportunities for students. Earlier in the year, World Food Prize speakers also came to lecture and engage students as well.

Students are required to take at least three years of all core classes. PE is only required for four semesters. Additionally, a number of electives are available for students within the curriculum. The district annually decides how many credits a student must earn to graduate.

== Notable alumni ==
- Austin Baeth (class of 2002 or 2003), member of the Iowa House of Representatives
- Randall Balmer (class of 1972), Dartmouth College department of religion chair
- Bruce Brubaker (class of 1977), musician and professor at the New England Conservatory of Music
- Eric Cooper (class of 1985), MLB umpire, multiple no-hitter games overseen
- Joe Dykstra (class of 1978), professional basketball player
- Jeremy Hellickson (class of 2005), MLB pitcher and 2019 World Series Champion
- Peewee Jarrett (class of 2018), professional American football player
- Joan Larsen (class of 1985), United States circuit judge of the United States Court of Appeals for the Sixth Circuit

== See also ==
- List of high schools in Iowa
