= North High School (Des Moines, Iowa) =

Public secondary school in Des Moines, Iowa, United States

Location
- 501 Holcomb Avenue; Des Moines, IA 50313; United States; 41°37′4.4″N 93°37′23.4″W

Information
- Type: Comprehensive Public High School
- Established: 1875
- School district: Des Moines Independent Community School District
- Superintendent: Dr. Matt Smith
- CEEB code: 161205
- Principal: Dr. Christopher Maniece
- Teaching staff: 68.06 (FTE)
- Grades: 9 to 12
- Gender: Coed
- Enrollment: 1,514 (2023-2024)
- Student to teacher ratio: 22.25
- Campus type: Urban
- Colors: Pink and green
- Athletics conference: Iowa Alliance Conference
- Mascot: Polar bear
- Rivals: East Scarlets; Hoover Huskies
- Website: Des Moines North

North High School is a public secondary school located in Des Moines, Iowa. It is one of five secondary schools in the Des Moines Independent Community School District.

== History ==
North High School was originally founded as Forest Home School in 1875 and became a high school in 1889. The school was incorporated into the Des Moines School District in 1907. The school moved to a new location in 1896. In 1957, the school moved again. The school was renovated in 2011. A student was injured in a drive-by shooting in 2014. Another student was injured in a shooting connected to a confrontation at the school in 2021.

On December 17, 1965, John Tinker was kicked out of the school for wearing a black armband in protest of the Vietnam War. His parents sued in Tinker v. Des Moines Independent Community School District, which went to the Supreme Court and set a legal standard for free expression in American schools.

== Academics ==
North High School is ranked 212th to 317th within the state of Iowa and 3rd to 5th in the Des Moines Independent Community School District by US News.

== Athletics ==
North High School was a member of the Central Iowa Metro League until its exit in 2021 when it formed the Iowa Alliance Conference with 10 other schools. It is also a part of the Iowa High School Athletic Association and Iowa Girls High School Athletic Union. It participates in football, volleyball, cross country, golf, swimming, basketball, bowling, wrestling, track and field, soccer, tennis, baseball and softball in the school year. The high school's football team was featured in an ESPN documentary in 2016.

=== Awards ===
- 6-time State Cross Country Champions (1944, 1945, 1946, 1950, 1952, 1953)
- 2-time State Boys' Swimming Champions (1938, 1942)
- Boys' 7-time State Track and Field Champions (1917, 1919, 1934, 1948, 1953, 1954, 1959)
- 3-time State Champions (1931, 1934, 1936)

== Extracurricular activities ==
North High School's Academic Decathlon team placed 4th in the state in 2011. The Academic Decathlon team placed 5th in the state and 7th in the Medium School e-Nationals in 2012. In 2024, the school also has the first team to enter a NASA competition from Iowa. The NASA competition team advanced to the interview phase of the competition.

== Notable alumni ==
- Herbert W. Armstrong (class of 1910), founder of the Grace Communion International
- Ed Beisser (class of 1939), All-American basketball player at Creighton University in 1943 and three-time AAU national champion
- MarTay Jenkins (class of 1993), former NFL wide receiver for the Arizona Cardinals
- John F. Tinker (class of 1968), one of the petitioners in the Supreme Court case Tinker v. Des Moines Schools
- Roger Williams (class of 1942), pianist

== See also ==
- Des Moines Independent Community School District for other schools in the same district.
- List of high schools in Iowa
