= Central Academy =

- U.S. National Register of Historic Places
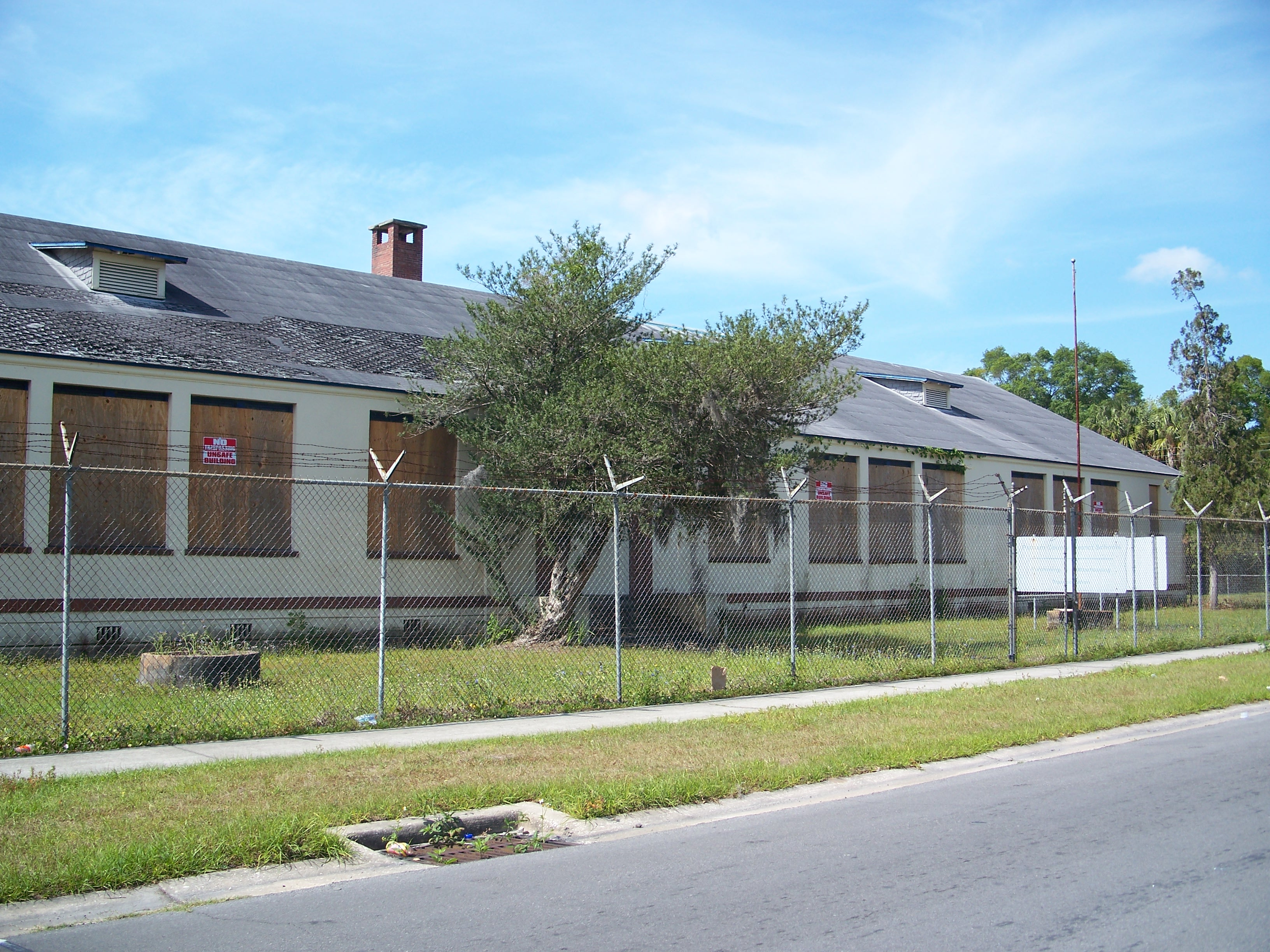

- Location within Florida Location within the United States
- Location: Palatka, Florida
- Coordinates: 29°39′19″N 81°38′26″W
- NRHP reference No.: 98001348
- Added to NRHP: November 12, 1998

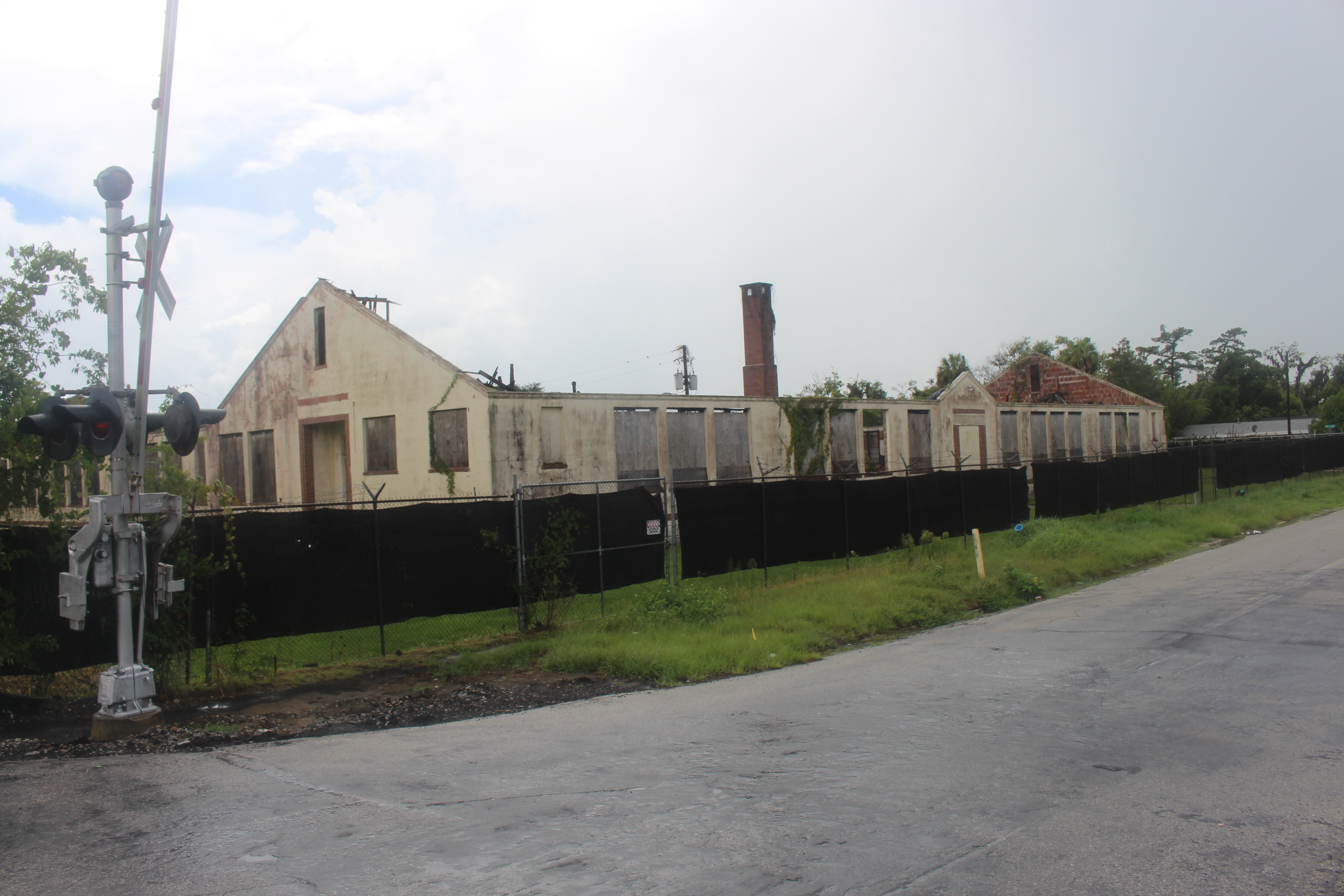
Building in August 2026

The Central Academy (also known as the Old Central Academy High School) is a historic site in Palatka, Florida. Established in 1892, Central Academy became the first accredited African-American high school in Florida in 1924. It was added to the U.S. National Register of Historic Places on November 12, 1998, and is located at 807 N 13th St, Palatka, FL 32177

The first Central Academy building was destroyed by fire in 1936. The present building replaced it in 1937. For a time it served as the school district's transportation office. The building, which the district turned over to the Palatka Housing Authority, fell into disrepair. A committee is working to raise money for its restoration.
