= Abraham Lincoln High School (Des Moines, Iowa) =

Public secondary school in Des Moines, Iowa, United States

Coordinates: 41.561943°N 93.626396°W

Lincoln High School

Location
- 2600 SW 9th Street; Des Moines, Iowa 50315; United States

Information
- Type: Public secondary
- Established: 1923
- School district: Des Moines Independent Community School District
- Superintendent: Matt Smith (interim)
- Principal: Praveen Bannikatti
- Teaching staff: 89.48 (FTE)
- Grades: 9–12
- Enrollment: 2,441 (2023-2024)
- Student to teacher ratio: 27.28
- Campus: Urban
- Colors: Maroon and gold
- Athletics conference: Iowa Alliance Conference
- Nickname: Railsplitters
- Rivals: Dowling Maroons; East Scarlets; Roosevelt Roughriders
- Website: Des Moines Lincoln

Abraham Lincoln High School, usually referred to simply as Lincoln High School or Lincoln, is a public secondary school located in Des Moines Southside, Des Moines, Iowa, United States. It is one of five secondary schools under the district of the Des Moines Independent Community School District, the largest high school in the Des Moines public school district and the state of Iowa. With a population of 2,409+ students operating out of two buildings on the Des Moines Southside, it was named after the 16th United States President Abraham Lincoln. The school sports team is named after one of President Lincoln's nicknames, the "Rail Splitter" (the "Lincoln Railsplitters" or "Rails"). Their mascot is typically a senior at the school or a recent alumni dressed up as Abraham Lincoln. The school is known as the Pride of the South Side.

== History ==
Lincoln High School was constructed to address the increasing enrollment of nearby East High School students. During this time, the south side of Des Moines was home to new urban development. This further increased enrollment and the need for an additional school. A bond issue was passed on March 18, 1918, that provided the funds to build the school. By 1923, construction was completed for USD 949,754.95.

At that time, the school had 55 classrooms, a swimming pool, two gymnasiums, several labs, an art and music room, a cafeteria, and an auditorium, providing a total student capacity of 1,300.

In 1962, an additional wing was constructed, with classrooms, laboratory areas, and a library with over 13,000 volumes.

In 1963, a male faculty lounge was added. To accommodate this, an existing light-well was enclosed.

In 1964, further expansions were contracted at a total cost of $1,667,000. This provided for the construction of the roundhouse, home to the indoor sporting venues. A new swimming pool and boys' locker room were constructed on the lower level. The old swimming pool was converted to classroom space, but the old gymnasiums are still used. The old locker rooms were remodeled into the girls' locker rooms.

There are several prized possessions at the school. On the floor of the vestibule is the school monogram done in bronze, surrounded by a design in variegated marble. On the south wall is a portrait of The Boy Lincoln, painted by Russell Cowles, a former student of West High School. On the north wall is Lincoln the Statesman, painted by William Reaser. In the main corridor is a bronze bust of Lincoln, the work of Laurence Stewart, a former student of East High.

The cornerstone of the old Lincoln School, which used to be at Ninth and Mulberry Streets, has been set as a memorial on the Lincoln High lawn. It was presented to the school with appropriate ceremonies when the old school was demolished. This cornerstone is only one of the many reminders of President Lincoln that the school preserved. There is a steel engraving of the Lincoln family from when Lincoln was in office, and one of the presidents himself presented it to the school by Fred Foss. A piece of a log from Lincoln's cabin birthplace was given by W. L. King, a former school teacher. An engraving of the national monument in the Soldiers’ National Cemetery, which President Lincoln dedicated with his famous Gettysburg Address, is also in the collection. In the auditorium above the stage are the words of that famous address in gold.

== Campus ==
Left: primary entrance; central: smokestack; right: Roundhouse Gymnasium

Lincoln has three levels of classrooms, with the Commons and music classrooms on the lowest level. The old "small gym" occupies the second and third levels in the main concourse (with the entrance on the second level). The Roundhouse is the primary gymnasium used at Lincoln. The upper level holds an arena with a capacity of 2,500. The lower level of the Roundhouse holds the weight-training area, boys' locker rooms, and swimming pool. All freshman classes were held at RAILS Academy (formally known as Kurtz Junior High building) from 2005 to 2018.

The renovated practice field

On the opposite side of Bell Avenue are two student parking lots, a track and practice field, and Hutchens Metro Stadium (home to football and track events). Hutchens Metro Stadium has a capacity of 7,500. In 2025, a $4.5 million renovation of the old general practice field was completed. The renovation featured a new practice football field surrounded by a track.

== Fine arts ==
Drama – The Drama Department has won awards, especially in IHSSA. It presents two full-length performances each year.

Music – Musical groups at Lincoln include Concert Band, Marching Band, Jazz Band I, Jazz Band II, Pep Band, Orchestra, Chamber Choir, Treble Choir, Concert Choir, RAILS Ninth Grade Choirs, Infinity Varsity Show Choir, Omega JV Show Choir, and Jazz Choir. The Lincoln Vocal Music Department is led by Director Christian White, assisted by Director Paige Harpin. The Lincoln High School Fight Song is based on the fight song of the College of Washington and Lee in Virginia.

Journalism – The official school newspaper is The Railsplitter. It has received merit recognition from the National Scholastic Press Association and Columbia School of Journalism, the highest recognition given to a high school publication. There is also an independent newspaper, The Random Independent, created by freshmen at Lincoln South.

Visual arts – Art classes include Painting/Drawing/Multi-media, 3D design, and AP Studio Art. Each year, the art department competes in exhibitions and art shows. The art club is called the Dorian Art Club.

== Athletics ==
Lincoln is a member of the Iowa Alliance Conference, which comprises 11 schools across Iowa, and is divided into two divisions. Lincoln competes in the South Division with the other Des Moines Metro Schools and Ottumwa.

Until March 1, 2021, Lincoln was a member of the Central Iowa Metro League (CIML), which consisted of 19 schools across central Iowa and was divided into four divisions. Lincoln competed in the CIML Metro division. The division included six teams: the five Des Moines schools (East, Hoover, Lincoln, North, and Roosevelt) and Ottumwa.

Lincoln High School has 19 sports – ten for boys and nine for girls – and there are ample opportunities for students to get involved, either as participant or team manager.

State Championships
Sport	Year(s)
Baseball	1955 (Spring), 1998
Basketball (boys)	1975
Cross country (boys)	1968
Golf (boys)	1937, 1939, 1983
Softball	1999, 2001
Track & Field (boys)	Team Mile (1956, 1973)
Bowling (girls)	2026

== Students ==
As of the 2005–06 school year, 2,126 students enrolled at Lincoln, making the school the largest in Iowa, ahead of West High School in Davenport. 76.9% of the student body is of White (European-American) descent (down from 79.3% in the 2004–05 school year). The leading ethnic group by enrollment is Latino descent, followed by Black (African-American), Asian, and Indian (Native American or Alaskan Native). This makes the school the least diverse of the other high schools in the Des Moines Public School district.

== Faculty ==
There are approximately 107 instructors at Lincoln High, which puts the student-teacher ratio at about 20 students per course instructor. 76 additional personnel carry out other administrative duties. In total, the faculty count is approximately 183.

== Extracurricular activities ==
As of the 2023 - 2024 school year.

=== Extra & Co-Curricular Clubs ===
- After School Game Club
- Art Club
- Band (Marching, Jazz, Concert, Pep)
- Brother 2 Brother
- Cheerleading
- Core
- Debate / Mock Trial
- Drama Club (International Thespian Society Troupe #4752)
- Dream 2 Teach
- GSA (Gay Straight Alliance)
- Key Club
- Movement 515
- National Honor Society
- Orchestra
- Railettes
- Railmen
- Robotics
- Science Bound
- Sisters for Success
- Student Council
- Trendsettas
- Vocal Music
- Winter Running

=== Athletics ===
- Baseball
- Basketball
- Bowling
- Cross Country
- Football
- Golf
- Soccer
- Softball
- Swimming
- Tennis
- Track and Field
- Volleyball
- Wrestling

== Curriculum ==
Each student is required to take eight classes. The school district requires students to take several core academic courses, including Social Studies, English, Mathematics, Science, Art, and Physical Education. The school district determines the amount of academic credit needed to satisfy graduation requirements. Many students also attend Central Academy and Central Campus in downtown Des Moines to acquire college credit and technical proficiency.

The district requires all students to enroll in four subject courses and a Physical Education course. However, the school compels lower-class students to schedule a full day of classes, to ensure satisfaction with district graduation requirements. Sophomores and Seniors have a “directed study” where they must stay in a class where they study and finish class work while Freshmen and Juniors have an “open period” when they may leave the school and don't have an assigned classroom, this is scheduled one class period of each school day.

The district requires four years of Physical Education. Freshmen and sophomores usually take their PE courses at the school. Juniors and seniors can take alternative PE programs, including a bowling class that requires students to commute to a nearby bowling alley. In compliance with state law, students with a full academic schedule can be exempted from all year's PE requirements or allowed to perform self-study PE.

== Notable alumni ==
- Jordan Bernstine, former professional football player
- Tom Choi, actor
- Jerry Crawford, lawyer
- Victor Jackovich, former U.S. Ambassador to Bosnia & Herzegovina
- Nicholas A. Klinefeldt, U.S. attorney
- Kevin McCarthy, Iowa politician
- Christopher McDonald (jurist), Iowa Supreme Court judge
- Pete Sterbick, college football coach
- Corey Taylor, musician, front man of Slipknot and Stone Sour
- Tanya Warren, Northern Iowa Women's Basketball coach
- Trevon Young, former professional football player

== See also ==
- Des Moines Independent Community School District for other schools in the same district
- List of high schools in Iowa
