= East High School (Des Moines, Iowa) =

Public secondary school in Des Moines, Iowa, United States

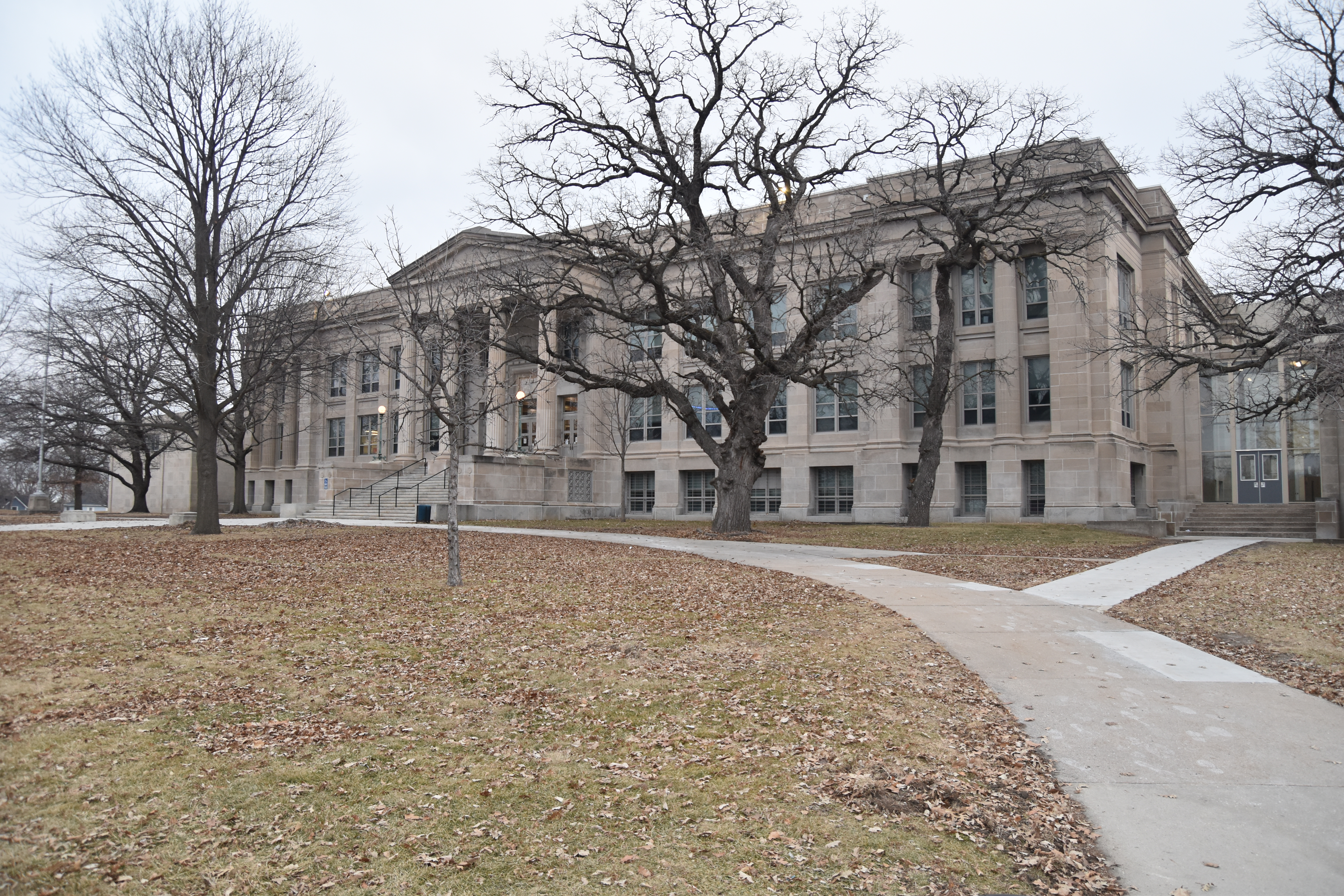

Location
- 815 E 13th Street; Des Moines, Iowa 50316; United States; 41°35′49″N 93°36′00″W

Information
- Type: Public Secondary
- Motto: For the Service of Humanity
- Established: 1861; 165 years ago
- School district: Des Moines Independent Community School District
- Superintendent: Matt Smith
- NCES School ID: 190897000528
- President: Laila Fisher
- Principal: Jill Versteeg
- Staff: 94.20 (FTE)
- Grades: 9–12
- Enrollment: 1,968 (2024-25)
- Student to teacher ratio: 21.66
- Campus: Urban
- Colors: Red and black
- Athletics conference: Iowa Alliance Conference
- Mascot: East Scarlets
- Rivals: Lincoln Rail Splitters; North Polar Bears; Southeast Polk Rams
- Website: Des Moines East

East High School, often locally referred to as East or East High, is a public secondary school located in Des Moines, Iowa, United States. East is the oldest high school in the Des Moines metro and is part of the Des Moines Public Schools. East is currently the seventh largest high school in the state by enrollment with 2,076 students.

== History ==
=== Creation and early history ===
East High was established in 1861 on the top floor of Bryant School, a primary school located at East 9th and Grand Ave. (sometimes listed as Pennsylvania Ave. and Grand Ave. - the other end of the same block) in Des Moines.

Graduation rates in the early years were extremely low - an Elizabeth Mathews was the sole member of the very first graduating class in 1871, and there were no further high school graduates until 1875. In 1877, the high school moved to the top floor of Webster School at the corner of E. 12th and Lyon Street, where it remained until 1891. Rising enrollment forced the freshman class back to Bryant School in 1888.

In 1891, a new and larger dedicated school building with an auditorium, cafeteria and laboratories was opened at E. 12th and Court, directly adjacent to the Iowa State Capitol grounds. At inception, in addition to the high school it housed all the primary students from Bryant and Webster, as well as the offices of the Board of Education and Superintendent. It is written that the students from Bryan and Webster marched to the new facility in a snowstorm. The primary students remained until 1903, when Cary School was built to house them. Originally there were about 200 students, subsequently growing to around 700. One of the few available photos of this building is on the cover of the 1910 Quill yearbook.

In anticipation of yet a larger school, an entire square block of land just a few blocks away from the Capitol was purchased by the East Des Moines School District in 1901 from the State of Iowa for $8,000. The current main building of East High School at E. 13th and Walker St. was constructed in 1910-1911 at a cost of $400,000 to a design by architects Bird and Rawson. A bond issue and ultimately an Iowa Supreme Court ruling were required to allow construction to go forward. Groundbreaking was done by Principal May Goodrell on September 6, 1910, who also placed the cornerstone on January 18, 1911. However, construction costs had consumed the entire budget, leaving little money for furnishings. This delayed occupancy of the building until May 17, 1912, when once again a procession of students marched from the 1891 building to the new school, bringing furnishings with them.

From 1911 onward, the East High campus has never moved again, and it has remained continuously in use as a three- or four-year high school. The main building has received a number of additions, such that it is now surrounded on three sides by newer construction, leaving only the original West-facing neo-classical facade fully exposed (see infobox photo).

=== Drive By Shooting ===
On March 7, 2022, it was reported that a school shooting had occurred on the property, killing 15 year old Jose David Lopez and hospitalizing two female students. Police said that the shots most likely came from a moving vehicle. Police said that Jose David Lopez was not a student of the school but he was the intended target of the shooting. Police had several suspects in custody just hours after the event occurred.

== Campus ==
East High is located on East 14th Street (also known as U.S. Route 69) in Des Moines, close to Interstate 235. There is ample grass-covered recreation space, as well as parking, to the west and north of the main building. There is one annex, situated a block away from the main campus.

=== Main Building Complex ===
While the main East High is one large building, it consists of several distinct areas built at different times. Some facilities, including the cafeteria, offices, band room, and student center have been relocated more than once, and the East wing was substantially altered in the large 2006 renovation.

- Main Building (built 1910, dedicated 1911, occupied 1912, renovated 2005 with completion on January 4, 2006). Four stories high, the first floor houses Special Education, Speech, Spanish, ELL and Home Economics classes. The second floor is home to the auditorium, counselors' offices, and Drama classes. The third floor houses general English, Math, Science and History and Social Studies classes for freshmen year. The fourth floor holds the art rooms, Special Education and ELL classes.
- East Wing or Gym Wing (1955). Originally home to the main gymnasium, weight room, student center, and Technology Education classes.
- South Wing or Media Center (1968). The first two floors are occupied by the East High Library, while English classrooms take up the third floor.
- North Wing (1973). The first floor holds Mathematics classrooms and Special Ed, while the second floor hosts Economics and Computer Sciences.
- Renovations, new connector building and performing arts wing (completed August 2006).Major $22.6M project with over 100,000 sq. ft. of construction that replaced the student center, cafeteria, offices, music rooms, gymnasium and locker rooms.

=== Walker Annex ===
Beginning with the 2008-2009 school year, freshman classes were moved to the Walker Annex, located one block away from the main campus. Freshmen attended physical education, chorus, band, and orchestra classes on the main campus, but attended their basic science, math, English, and history courses in the Walker building. In 2012, freshman classes were switched back to the main building. The Walker Annex is now used for students with academic and attendance issues and Boys' & Girls Club.

== Students ==
As of the 2021-2022 school year, there were 2076 students enrolled at East High, making it the seventh largest public high school in Iowa.

=== Enrollment ===
Including some selected historic years for which data is available.

Year	Total	Seniors (12th grade)	Juniors (11th grade)	Sophomores (10th grade)	Freshmen (9th grade)
2024-2025	1,968	530	514	458	466
2023-2024	2,013	536	494	517	476
2022-2023	2,040	547	494	505	494
2021-2022	2,076				509
2020-2021	2,097	537	482	544	534
2015-2016	2,307				
2005-2006	2,115	357	419	559	780
2004-2005	2,125	384	384	592	765
2003-2004	1,970	302	438	496	734
2002-2003	1,841	319	359	497	666
1917-1918	1400+				
1916-1917	1,306				
1914-1915	1,029				
1912-1913	832 (first year in new building)				
1911-1912	713 (last year in 1891 building)				
1910-1911	692				
1907-1908	585				
1905-1906	470				
1900-1901	400				
1895-1896	291				
1890-1891	243				
1885-1886	138				

== Curriculum ==
The school day is split into eight periods containing a mix of core academic subjects and electives. There are two lunches, each 45 minutes split between a first and second lunch depending on their 4th period's floor number. Students on the third or fourth floor have first lunch, while students on the first and second floor have second lunch. The school district requires that students take a number of core academic courses, if they wish to graduate and receive a diploma. This includes Social Studies, English, Mathematics, Science, Art, and Physical Education, among other electives.

The amount of academic credit needed to satisfy graduation requirements is determined by the school district and the state of Iowa. Usually, it is required to have four years of English, and three years of Science, Social Science, and math. Physical Education is required each year unless under a religious exempt. The school counselors compel Freshman and Sophomore students to schedule a full day of classes, to ensure satisfaction with district graduation requirements. Seniors and juniors have the option of having an "open period" during the school day.

Advanced learners have the opportunity to attend Central Academy, with an extended rigorous curriculum, while general students can attend Central Campus, with a focus on 21st century skills and hands-on learning.

== Achievements ==
=== Athletic Championships ===
- 2024 Girl's Class 3A State Bowling
- 2011 Girl's Class 4A State Softball Champions
- 2011 Girls' Class 4A State Basketball Champions
- 2006 Girls' Class 4A State Softball Champions
- 1981 Girls' Softball Champions
- 1980 Class 4A State Baseball Champions
- 1979 Girls' State Basketball Champions
- Boys' Cross Country Team State Championships: 1937 A, 1941 A, 1942 A, 1943 A, 1949 AA.
- Boys' Golf State Champions 1928.
- Boys' Track and Field Team State Champions: 1909, 1926, 1928, 1936, 1938, 1939, 1940, 1943, 1944, 1950 A, 1951 A.

=== Academics ===
- 2025 Speech & Debate National Qualifiers
- 2025 Academic Decathlon State Qualifiers
- 2024 Speech & Debate National Qualifiers
- 2024 Academic Decathlon State Qualifiers
- 2023 Academic Decathlon State Qualifiers
- 2022 Newspaper Team of the Year, Scroll
- 2019 Academic Decathlon State Qualifiers
- 2015 Academic Decathlon State Qualifiers
- 1998 Iowa Teacher of the Year, Ruth Ann Gaines

== Notable alumni ==
- Connie Boesen, Class of 1969, current mayor of Des Moines. Served as a member of the Des Moines School Board from 2003 to 2017 and as an at-large member of the Des Moines City Council from 2017 to 2023, while also working for 34 years as a buyer at Younkers and founding a concessions company called Applishus in 1988.
- Gregory Alan Williams, actor in films including Remember the Titans, Major League, Above the Law, In the Line of Fire and Old School. Appearances on TV shows including Baywatch, The West Wing, The Sopranos and Boston Public.
- Lorri Bauman, Class of 1980, first Women's NCAA Basketball player to score 3,000 points. One of five NCAA women basketball players to reach that milestone. Inducted into the Iowa Girls High School Athletic Union Basketball Hall of Fame.
- Pauline Brown Humphrey, Iowa cosmetologist and business woman
- Stephen Kline, artist, photographer, and designer of the $10,000,000 Florida State of the Arts License Plate. Recent works include his new Lines of Language technique, creating drawings from words. Early works include the 1961 Quill cover.
- Marilyn Maye, jazz and cabaret singer, 1966 Grammy nominee

== See also ==
- Des Moines Independent Community School District for other schools in the same district.
- List of high schools in Iowa
