= List of companies in the Dallas–Fort Worth metroplex =

For a list of companies based within Dallas city limits, go to List of companies in Dallas

The Dallas/Fort Worth Metroplex is home to over 24 corporate headquarters, making the Dallas/Fort Worth Metroplex one of the largest corporate headquarters concentration in the United States. This also has resulted in the growth of Dallas/Fort Worth International Airport, home to American Airlines, the second largest airline in the world, largest in the U.S. and the rapid population growth of the metropolitan area, the fourth largest in the United States. In recent years, the Dallas–Fort Worth metroplex has also attracted many other large companies such as Toyota, State Farm, JPMorgan Chase and Core-Mark. In 2019, Charles Schwab announced it would be relocating its San Francisco headquarters to Westlake, a suburb of Fort Worth.

The following companies are a selection of notable companies based in the metropolitan area.

== Fortune 500 companies ==
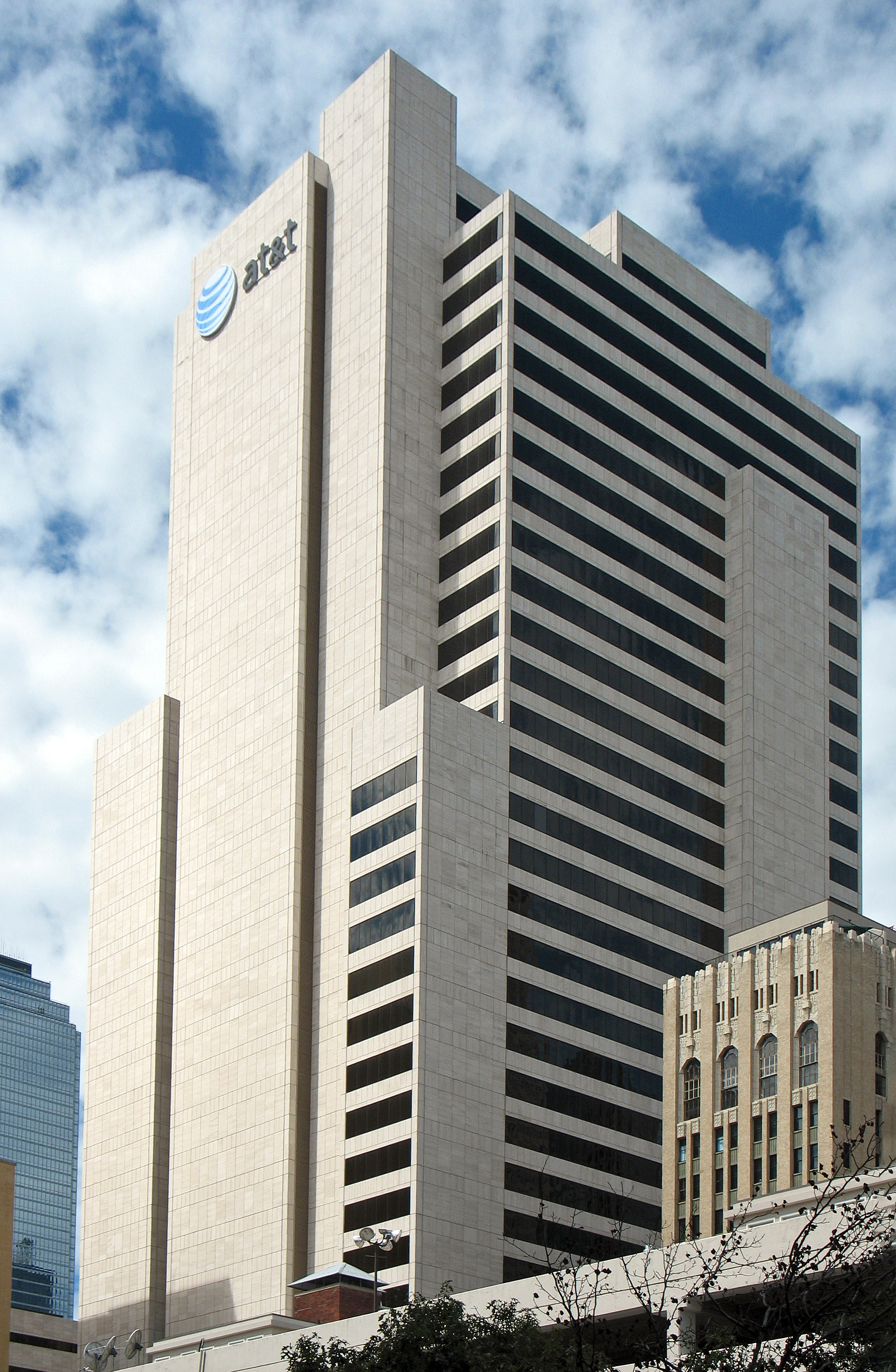
Whitacre Tower - AT&T's corporate headquarters in Dallas

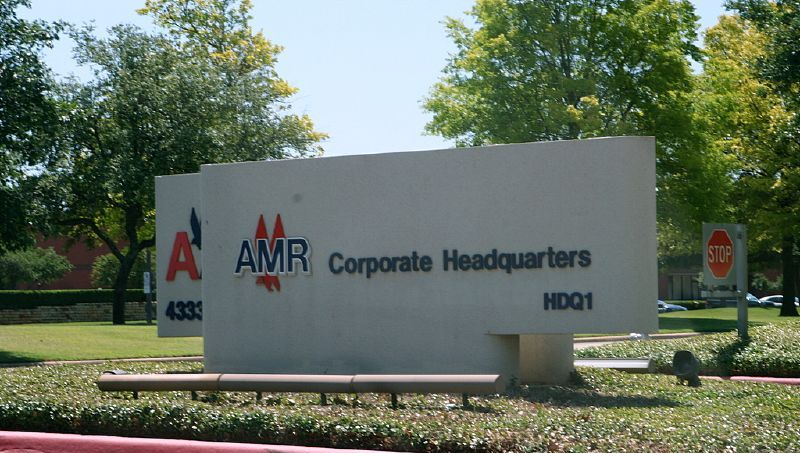
Headquarters of AMR Corporation, American Airlines, and American Eagle in Fort Worth

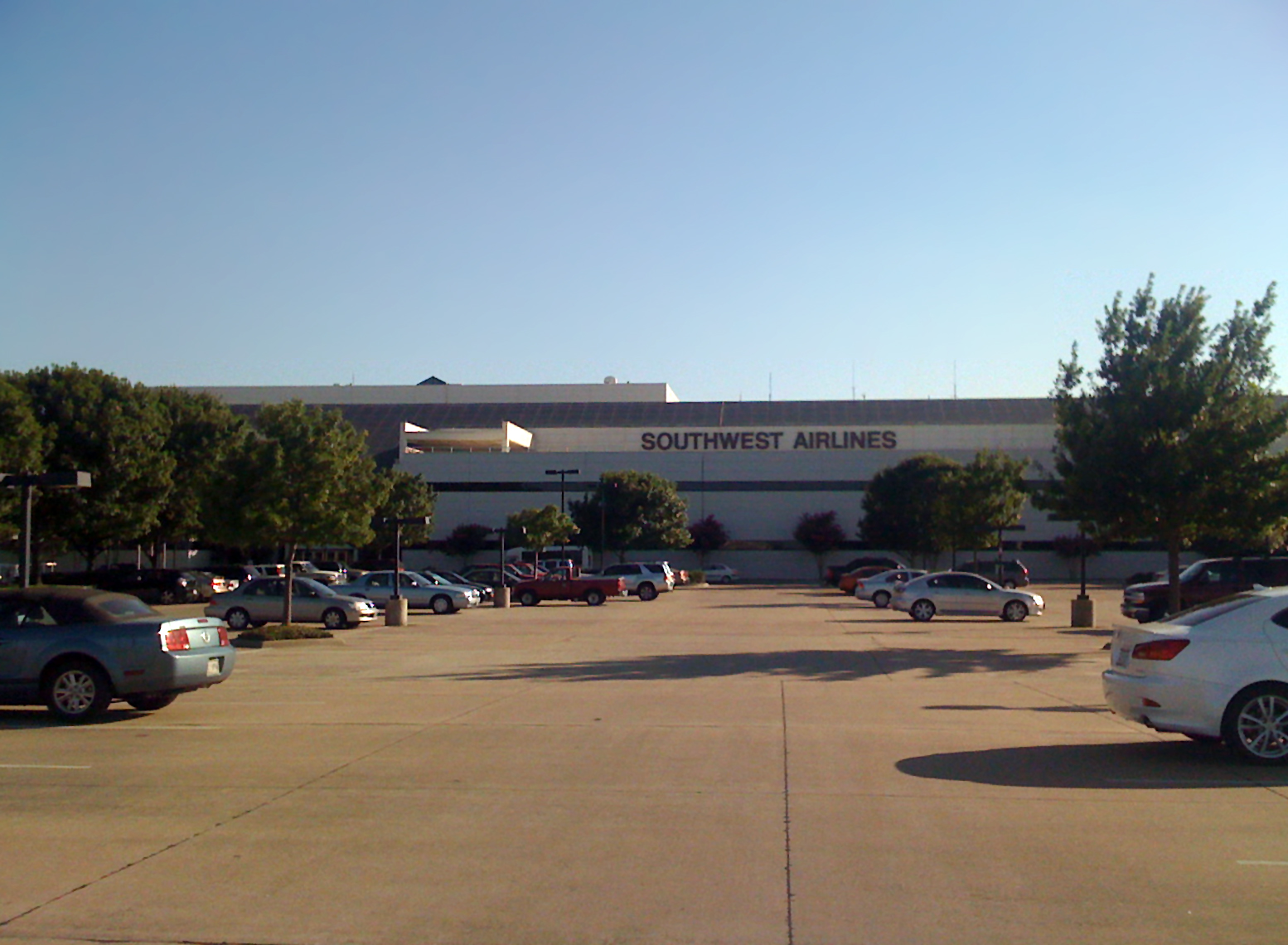
Southwest Airlines headquarters in Dallas

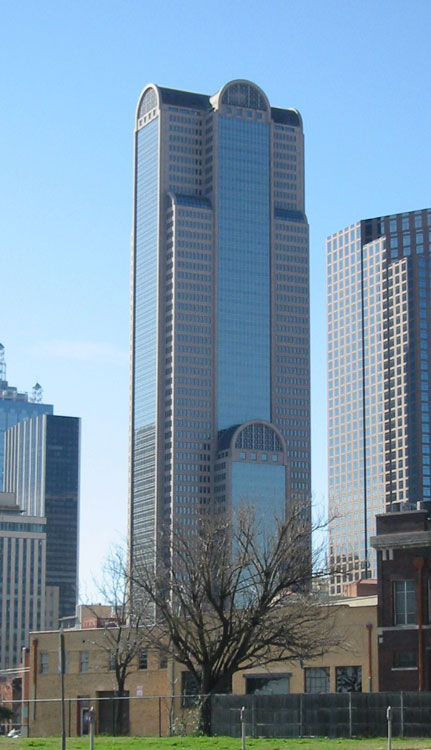
Comerica Bank Tower

The following are the Fortune 500 companies headquartered in the Dallas–Fort Worth metroplex:

- 9 McKesson (Irving)
- 13 AT&T (Dallas)
- 54 Energy Transfer Partners (Dallas)
- 73 Caterpillar (Irving)
- 114 American Airlines Group (Fort Worth)
- 124 DR Horton (Arlington)
- 126 CBRE Group (Dallas)
- 176 Builders FirstSource (Irving)
- 181 Tenet Healthcare (Dallas)
- 182 Kimberly-Clark (Irving)
- 188 Charles Schwab Corporation (Westlake)
- 197 HF Sinclair (Dallas)
- 198 Texas Instruments (Dallas)
- 234 Southwest Airlines (Dallas)
- 259 Fluor Corporation (Irving)
- 260 AECOM (Dallas)
- 262 Jacobs Solutions (Dallas)
- 315 Vistra Corp (Irving)
- 406 Celanese (Irving)
- 484 Commercial Metals (Irving)
- 485 EnLink Midstream (Dallas)

== Other notable companies either based or having a significant presence in the Dallas–Fort Worth area ==
- 7-Eleven (Irving)
- Acme Brick (Fort Worth)
- Alcon (Fort Worth)
- ADI Corporation (Dallas)
- At Home (Plano)
- Bell Textron (Fort Worth)
- Ben E. Keith Company (Fort Worth)
- BestMaid (Fort Worth)
- Black-eyed Pea (Arlington)
- BNSF (Fort Worth)
- Borden Milk Products (Dallas)
- Boston Pizza Restaurants (Dallas)
- Briggs Equipment (Dallas)
- Brinker International (Dallas)
- BT Group (Coppell)
- Carlson Restaurants Worldwide (Carrollton)
- Cash America International (Fort Worth)
- Catalyst Brands (Plano)
- Chili's (Dallas)
- Christus Health (Irving)
- Cicis (Irving)
- Cinemark (Plano)
- Citibank (Irving)
- Comerica (Dallas)
- Continental Electronics (Dallas)
- Copart (Dallas)
- Corgan (Dallas)
- Corner Bakery Cafe (Dallas)
- Chuck E. Cheese (Irving)
- Crossmark (Plano)
- Crunchyroll (Coppell)
- Dave & Buster's (Dallas)
- Delek (Dallas)
- Dickey's Barbecue Pit (Dallas)
- DXC Technology (Plano)
- Ericsson (Plano)
- Essilor of America (Dallas)
- Fairmount Food Group (Dallas)
- FedEx Office (Plano)
- FFE Transportation (Dallas)
- Fidelity Investments (Westlake)
- Finley Resources (Fort Worth)
- FirstService Residential (Dallas)
- Fisher Investments (Plano)
- Fiserv (Frisco)
- Flowserve (Irving)
- Fossil Group (Richardson)
- Frito-Lay (Plano)
- Fujitsu (Richardson)
- Galderma (Fort Worth)
- GAINSCO (Dallas)
- GameStop (Grapevine)
- Gap Broadcasting Group (Dallas)
- Gartner, Inc. (Irving)
- GE Capital (Arlington)
- GM Financial (Fort Worth)
- Goldman Sachs (Dallas)
- Greyhound Lines (Dallas)
- Gutterth (Denton)
- Haggar Clothing (Dallas)
- Half Price Books (Dallas)
- Hall of Fame Racing (Dallas)
- HBK Investments (Dallas)
- Hitachi Consulting (Dallas)
- Hilltop Holdings Inc. (Dallas)
- Hoak Media Corporation (Dallas)
- Hotels.com (Dallas)
- id Software (Dallas)
- InfoCom Corporation (Dallas)
- Interstate Batteries (Dallas)
- Intuit (Plano)
- KidZania (USA headquarters) (Plano)
- Keurig Dr Pepper (USA headquarters) (Plano)
- Knockouts (Irving)
- Jamba Juice (Frisco)
- JPMorgan Chase (Plano)
- Justin Boots (Fort Worth)
- La Madeleine (Dallas)
- La Quinta Inns & Suites (Irving)
- Lennox International (Richardson)
- Liberty Mutual Insurance (Plano)
- Lockheed Martin (Fort Worth)
- Mary Kay (Addison)
- Match.com (Dallas)
- Matrix Business Technologies (Dallas)
- Merit Energy (Dallas)
- Metro by T-Mobile (Richardson)
- The Michaels Companies (Irving)
- Micron (Allen)
- Microsoft (Irving)
- Mohr Partners (Dallas)
- MoneyGram (Dallas)
- Monitronics (Farmers Branch)
- MumboJumbo (Dallas)
- NCH Corporation (Irving)
- Neiman Marcus (Dallas)
- NEC Corporation of America (Irving)
- Nexstar Media Group (Irving)
- Niagara Conservation Corporation (Fort Worth)
- Nokia (North American Headquarters) (Dallas)
- NTT Data (Plano)
- Old Gringo Boots (Fort Worth)
- TPG Sixth Street Partners
- Paycor (Frisco)
- Peterbilt (Denton)
- PlainsCapital Corporation (Dallas)
- Pizza Hut (Plano)
- Pioneer Corporation (Fort Worth)
- Primoris Services Corporation (Dallas)
- Qorvo (Richardson)
- Raytheon (McKinney)
- Red Mango (Dallas)
- Reddy Ice (Dallas)
- Rent-A-Center (Plano)
- Robinhood Markets (Westlake)
- Rolex (Dallas)
- Sabre Corporation (Southlake)
- Salesforce (Dallas)
- Sally Beauty Holdings (Denton)
- Sammons Enterprises (Dallas)
- ScrewAttack (Flower Mound)
- Siemens Digital Industries Software (Plano)
- Siemens (Grand Prairie, Texas)
- Six Flags (Grand Prairie)
- Skagen Denmark (Richardson)
- Smoothie King (Dallas)
- Solera Holdings (Westlake)
- State Farm Insurance (Richardson)
- TD Ameritrade (Westlake)
- Texas Capital Bank (Dallas)
- Think Finance (Dallas)
- Titanium Metals (Dallas)
- T-Mobile (Frisco)
- Topgolf (Dallas)
- Torchmark Corporation (Headquarters) (McKinney)
- Toyota Motor North America (Headquarters) (Plano)
- Travelocity (Dallas)
- Trinity Industries (Dallas)
- Tuesday Morning (Dallas)
- Tyler Technologies (Headquarters) (Plano)
- Uber Technologies (Dallas)
- United Surgical Partners International (Dallas)
- Verizon (Irving)
- Wingstop (Dallas)
- XTO Energy (Fort Worth)
- ZTE (USA headquarters) (Richardson)
