= KWDM =

High school radio station in West Des Moines, Iowa

Coordinates: 41.590°N 93.753°W

88.7 KWDM The Point
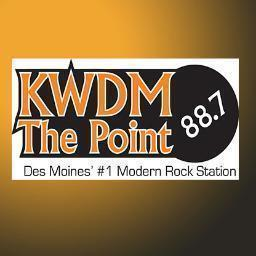
- West Des Moines, Iowa; United States
- Frequency: 88.7 (MHz)
- Branding: 88.7 KWDM The Point

Programming
- Format: Modern Rock/Alternative

Ownership
- Owner: West Des Moines Community School District

History
- First air date: October 1, 1976
- Call sign meaning: West Des Moines

Technical information
- Licensing authority: FCC
- Class: A
- ERP: 100 watts

Links
- Public license information: KWDM The Point Public file; LMS

KWDM, "88.7 KWDM The Point," is a modern rock high school radio station serving the Des Moines, Iowa area on 88.7 FM. The radio station's studio is located at Valley High School in West Des Moines. It is owned and operated by the West Des Moines Community School District and is operated by students at Valley under the direction of a staff advisor.

== History ==
On October 1, 1976, the West Des Moines Community School District signed KWDM on the air at 88.9 MHz. The KWDM call letters had previously been used on two commercial stations in Des Moines, 1150 AM (later KWKY) and 93.3 FM (later KIOA), under the ownership of George Webber. In 1994, KWDM's frequency was migrated from 88.9 FM to 88.7 FM and its power increased from 10 watts ERP to 100 watts. The station is one of two high school radio stations in Iowa, the other being KDPS operated by Des Moines Public Schools.
