= IFMC =

IFMC may refer to:

- Iowa Foundation for Medical Care
- Indie Film Music Contest
- International Folk Music Council
- Institute for Management Consulting
