= Cottage Grove Avenue Presbyterian Church =

- Cottage Grove Avenue; Presbyterian Church
- U.S. National Register of Historic Places
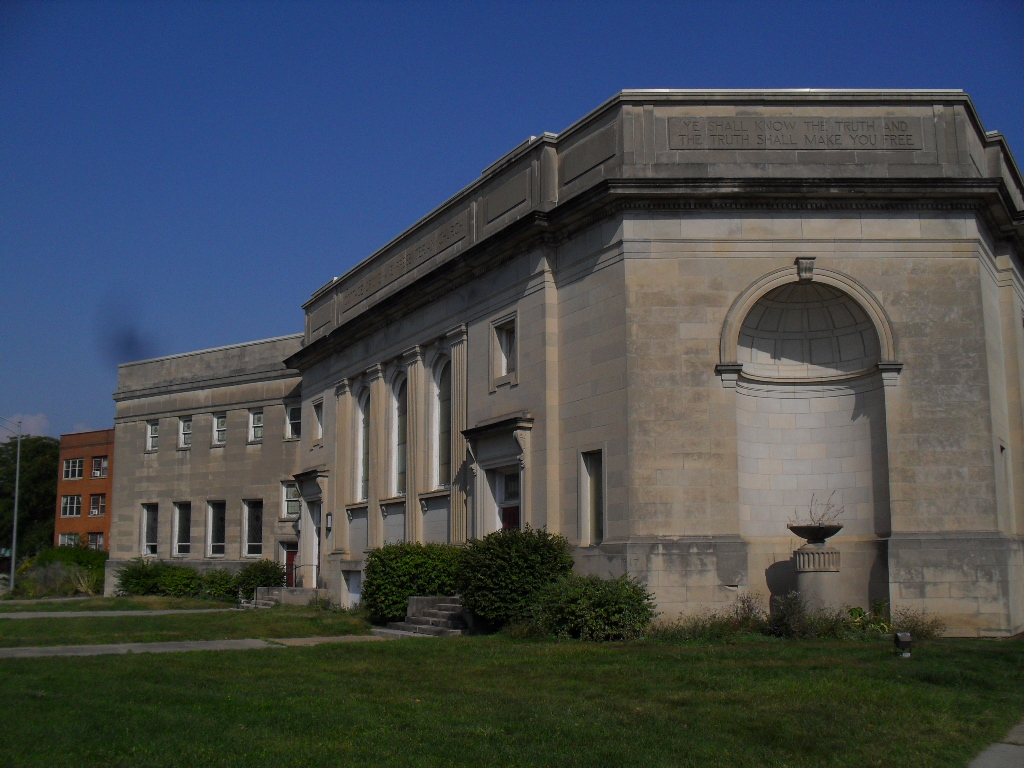

- Location within Iowa Location within the United States
- Location: 1050 24th St. Des Moines, Iowa
- Coordinates: 41°35′49.1″N 93°38′59.8″W
- Area: less than one acre
- Built: 1903, 1918
- Built by: B. F. Segner
- Architect: Clinton P. Shockley
- Architectural style: Classical Revival
- NRHP reference No.: 16000607
- Added to NRHP: April 12, 1984

Cottage Grove Avenue Presbyterian Church is a historic building located in Des Moines, Iowa, United States. It was listed on the National Register of Historic Places in 2016.

== History ==
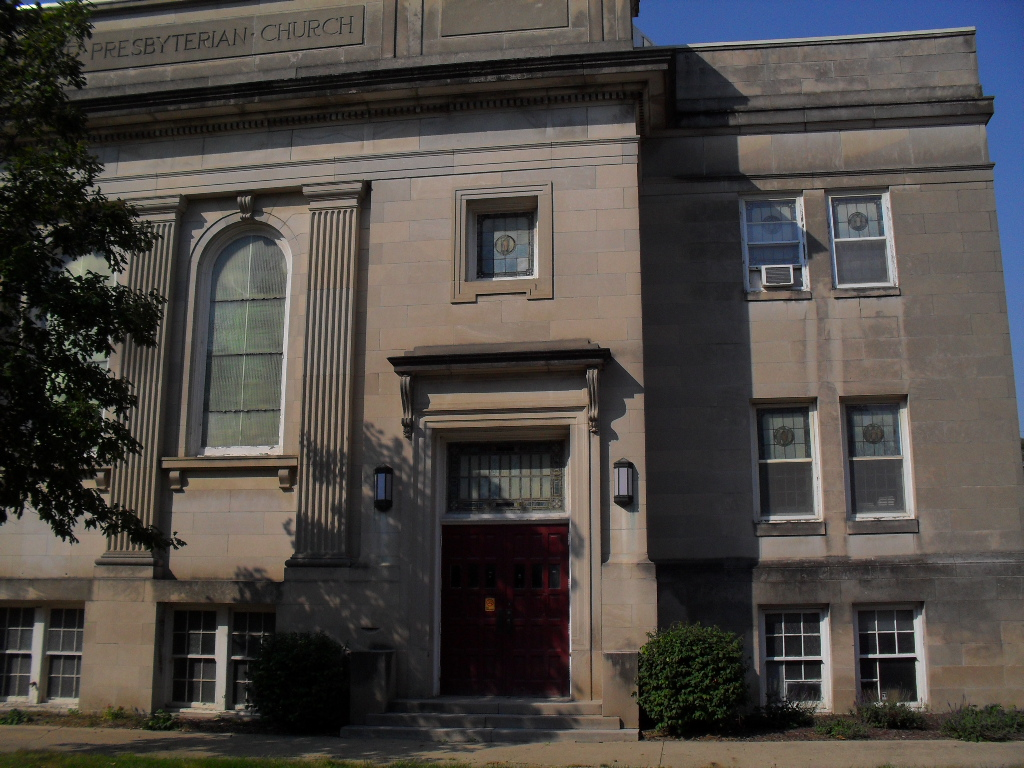
Entrance into the church off of 24th Street.

The congregation began in 1888 as Sixth Presbyterian Church and became Cottage Grove Avenue Presbyterian in 1910. They originally worshiped in tents and in a commercial building near the location of the present building. A brick, Gothic Revival church building was completed on this property in 1893. It was destroyed two years later in a fire caused by lightning. A new brick church was completed at the same location in 1903. Structural flaws in the building were diagnosed ten years later. The congregation maintained the Sunday School wing and replaced the sanctuary in 1918.

Waterloo, Iowa architect Clinton P. Shockley designed the 1918 sanctuary in the Neoclassical style. It was built by Des Moines contractor B. F. Segner. The building is a trapezoid, matching its lot, and features a veneer of Bedford stone and a flat roof. The south and east elevations feature five bays separated by four pilasters. A semi-circular niche is located in the southeast elevation. On the same elevation the maxim, "Ye Shall Know the Truth and the Truth Shall Make You Free" is cut into the limestone frieze. A veneer of stone was applied to the south elevation of the Sunday School wing, with its original painted brick on the other elevations.

At about the same time as the present sanctuary was built, the congregation began to take on the Progressive ideals of social reform and community service. The congregation's name change suggests its commitment to the neighborhood, and the new sanctuary does not have any traditional church embellishments on the exterior, but that of a home. The maxim etched into the southeast elevation stresses moral rectitude rather than Christian theology. During the pastorates of the Revs. William Burton Sanford and James Thompson Mordy the congregation took on the issues of restricted residential zoning in the area, the Negro Community Center, and youth programs. During the 1960s and the 1970s, the development of Interstate 235 to the south cut through the neighborhood, and the congregation found itself as an inner-city church. That provided it with opportunities for more community service.

At the same time the congregation began to lose membership, and in 2014 it decided to disband. The Presbytery of Des Moines now owns the building. They will continue to use the building for their offices, for a social outreach ministry to the areas homeless, and two Sudanese congregations, whose members emigrated to this country after civil wars in Sudan and South Sudan.
