= Windsor Heights, Iowa =

City in the United States

- City
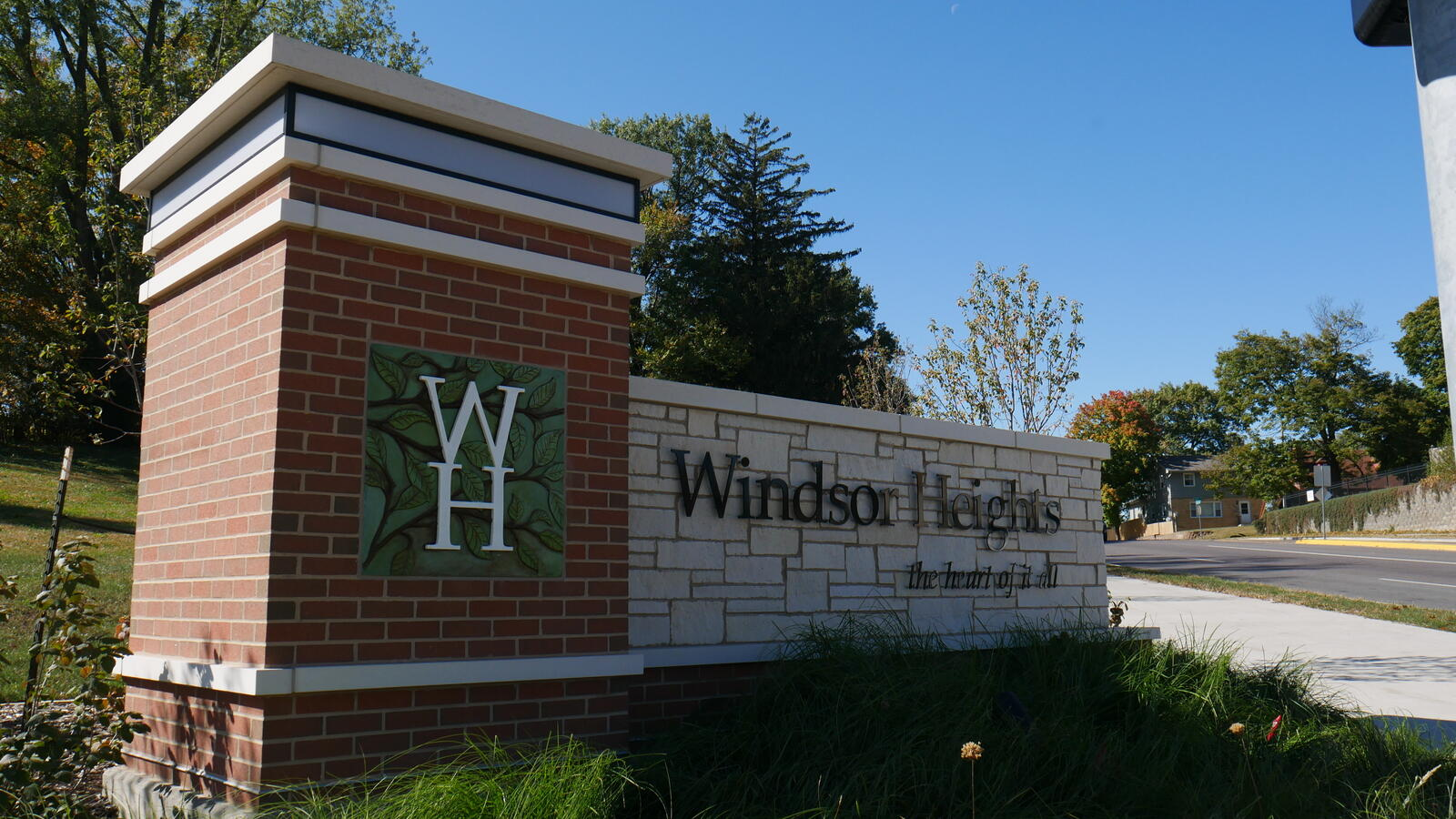
- Windsor Heights Welcome Sign

- Logo
- Motto: "The Heart of it all"
- Location in the State of Iowa
- Coordinates: 41°36′16″N 93°42′46″W
- Country: United States
- State: Iowa
- County: Polk
- Township: Walnut
- Incorporated: July 19, 1941

Area
  - Total: 1.44 sq mi (3.72 km^{2})
  - Land: 1.44 sq mi (3.72 km^{2})
  - Water: 0 sq mi (0.00 km^{2})
- Elevation: 876 ft (267 m)

Population (2020)
  - Total: 5,252
  - Density: 3,661.2/sq mi (1,413.61/km^{2})
- Time zone: UTC-6 (CST)
  - Summer (DST): UTC-5 (CDT)
- ZIP codes: 50324
- Area code: 515
- FIPS code: 19-86250
- GNIS feature ID: 2397343
- Website: www.windsorheights.org

Windsor Heights is a city in Walnut Township, Polk County, Iowa, United States. The population was 5,252 at the time of the 2020 census. It is part of the Des Moines–West Des Moines Metropolitan Statistical Area.

== History ==
Windsor Heights incorporated as a city on July 19, 1941. It was named for nearby Windsor Elementary School in Des Moines; the school was named for early settler Henry Clay Windsor, whose family donated land for the school. In 1958 Windsor Heights annexed the neighboring community of Crestwood, which added roughly 1,300 people to the city and established the city's present boundaries.

On June 26, 2008, the United States Postal Service gave Windsor Heights its own ZIP code of 50324 that was scheduled to take effect on July 1, 2009. Before that, the city shared ZIP codes with neighboring portions of Des Moines and Urbandale.

== Geography ==
According to the United States Census Bureau, the city has a total area of 1.41 square miles (3.65 km^{2}), all land.

Windsor Heights is surrounded by other cities: Urbandale to the north, Clive to the west, West Des Moines to the south, and Des Moines to the east. Interstate 235 runs through the far southern part of the city, U.S. Route 6 (Hickman Road) forms the boundary with Urbandale, and Iowa Highway 28 (63rd Street) the boundary with Des Moines.

=== Climate ===
Climate data for Windsor Heights, Iowa
Month	Jan	Feb	Mar	Apr	May	Jun	Jul	Aug	Sep	Oct	Nov	Dec	Year
Record high °F (°C)	67 (19)	78 (26)	91 (33)	93 (34)	105 (41)	103 (39)	110 (43)	110 (43)	101 (38)	95 (35)	82 (28)	69 (21)	110 (43)
Mean daily maximum °F (°C)	31 (−1)	36 (2)	49 (9)	62 (17)	72 (22)	82 (28)	86 (30)	84 (29)	76 (24)	63 (17)	48 (9)	34 (1)	60 (16)
Daily mean °F (°C)	23 (−5)	28 (−2)	40 (4)	52 (11)	62 (17)	72 (22)	77 (25)	75 (24)	66 (19)	53 (12)	40 (4)	26 (−3)	51 (11)
Mean daily minimum °F (°C)	14 (−10)	19 (−7)	30 (−1)	41 (5)	52 (11)	62 (17)	67 (19)	65 (18)	55 (13)	43 (6)	31 (−1)	18 (−8)	41 (5)
Record low °F (°C)	−30 (−34)	−26 (−32)	−22 (−30)	9 (−13)	26 (−3)	37 (3)	47 (8)	40 (4)	26 (−3)	7 (−14)	−10 (−23)	−22 (−30)	−30 (−34)
Average precipitation inches (mm)	1.0 (25)	1.3 (33)	2.3 (58)	3.9 (99)	4.7 (120)	4.9 (120)	4.5 (110)	4.1 (100)	3.0 (76)	2.6 (66)	2.2 (56)	1.4 (36)	35.9 (899)
Source: weather.com

== Demographics ==
Historical populations
Year	Pop.	±%
1950	1,414	—
1960	4,715	+233.5%
1970	6,303	+33.7%
1980	5,474	−13.2%
1990	5,190	−5.2%
2000	4,805	−7.4%
2010	4,860	+1.1%
2020	5,252	+8.1%
Source:"U.S. Census website". United States Census Bureau. and Iowa Data Center; Source: U.S. Decennial Census

=== 2020 census ===
As of the 2020 census, Windsor Heights had a population of 5,252, with 2,226 households and 1,361 families. The population density was 3,661.2 inhabitants per square mile (1,413.6/km^{2}). The median age was 39.8 years. 23.9% of residents were under age 20; 3.8% were from age 20 to 24; 28.8% were from age 25 to 44; 23.1% were from age 45 to 64; and 20.4% were age 65 or older. 22.5% of residents were under the age of 18. For every 100 females there were 94.2 males, and for every 100 females age 18 and over there were 90.5 males age 18 and over. The gender makeup of the city was 48.5% male and 51.5% female.

100.0% of residents lived in urban areas, while 0.0% lived in rural areas.

Of the city's 2,226 households, 27.9% had children under the age of 18 living in them. Of all households, 47.3% were married-couple households, 8.2% were cohabiting-couple households, 17.2% were households with a male householder and no spouse or partner present, and 27.4% were households with a female householder and no spouse or partner present. 38.9% of households were non-families. 30.8% of all households were made up of individuals, and 14.3% had someone living alone who was 65 years of age or older.

There were 2,320 housing units, with an average density of 1,617.3 per square mile (624.4/km^{2}). Of all housing units, 4.1% were vacant. The homeowner vacancy rate was 0.4% and the rental vacancy rate was 6.4%.

Racial composition as of the 2020 census
Race	Number	Percent
White	4,182	79.6%
Black or African American	242	4.6%
American Indian and Alaska Native	22	0.4%
Asian	260	5.0%
Native Hawaiian and Other Pacific Islander	3	0.1%
Some other race	117	2.2%
Two or more races	426	8.1%
Hispanic or Latino (of any race)	353	6.7%

=== 2010 census ===
As of the census of 2010, there were 4,860 people, 2,167 households, and 1,287 families living in the city. The population density was 3,446.8 inhabitants per square mile (1,330.8/km^{2}). There were 2,289 housing units at an average density of 1,623.4 per square mile (626.8/km^{2}). The racial makeup of the city was 91.1% White, 3.5% African American, 0.1% Native American, 2.4% Asian, 0.1% Pacific Islander, 1.2% from other races, and 1.6% from two or more races. Hispanic or Latino of any race were 3.7% of the population.

There were 2,167 households, of which 24.7% had children under the age of 18 living with them, 47.6% were married couples living together, 8.2% had a female householder with no husband present, 3.6% had a male householder with no wife present, and 40.6% were non-families. 31.7% of all households were made up of individuals, and 11.7% had someone living alone who was 65 years of age or older. The average household size was 2.24 and the average family size was 2.83.

The median age in the city was 43 years. 19.9% of residents were under the age of 18; 6.6% were between the ages of 18 and 24; 25.7% were from 25 to 44; 29.5% were from 45 to 64; and 17.9% were 65 years of age or older. The gender makeup of the city was 47.6% male and 52.4% female.

=== 2000 census ===
As of the census of 2000, there were 4,805 people, 2,163 households, and 1,349 families living in the city. The population density was 3,399.3 inhabitants per square mile (1,312.5/km^{2}). There were 2,222 housing units at an average density of 1,572.0 per square mile (607.0/km^{2}). The racial makeup of the city was 95.07% White, 1.73% Black, 0.08% Native American, 1.25% Asian, 0.06% Pacific Islander, 0.58% from other races, and 1.23% from two or more races. Hispanic or Latino of any race were 1.58% of the population.

There were 2,163 households, out of which 22.6% had children under the age of 18 living with them, 53.5% were married couples living together, 6.5% had a female householder with no husband present, and 37.6% were non-families. 30.7% of all households were made up of individuals, and 11.3% had someone living alone who was 65 years of age or older. The average household size was 2.21 and the average family size was 2.77.

19.6% are under the age of 18, 5.9% from 18 to 24, 28.6% from 25 to 44, 25.4% from 45 to 64, and 20.4% who were 65 years of age or older. The median age was 42 years. For every 100 females, there were 90.1 males. For every 100 females age 18 and over, there were 87.2 males.

The median income for a household in the city was $55,931, and the median income for a family was $65,536. Males had a median income of $41,218 versus $31,854 for females. The per capita income for the city was $29,966. About 2.6% of families and 5.2% of the population were below the poverty line, including 5.3% of those under age 18 and 3.2% of those age 65 or over.

== Education ==
Windsor Heights is served by both the West Des Moines Community School District (WDMCS) and Des Moines Public Schools (DMPS), with 70th Street serving as the boundary line for the districts. Each district also has schools within the city boundaries, with Clive Learning Academy serving WDMCS students and Cowles Montessori School serving DMPS students.

== Transportation ==
Transit service in the city is provided by Des Moines Area Regional Transit. Bus routes 3, 74 and 92 connect the city to the region.

== In popular culture ==
The town's Dairy Queen franchise briefly became famous due to a viral tweet by Iowa Senator Chuck Grassley who informed his followers "Windsor Heights Dairy Queen is good place for u kno what." Grassley later informed a reporter his tweet referenced the fact that he enjoyed Dairy Queen ice cream.
