= West Des Moines, Iowa =

- City
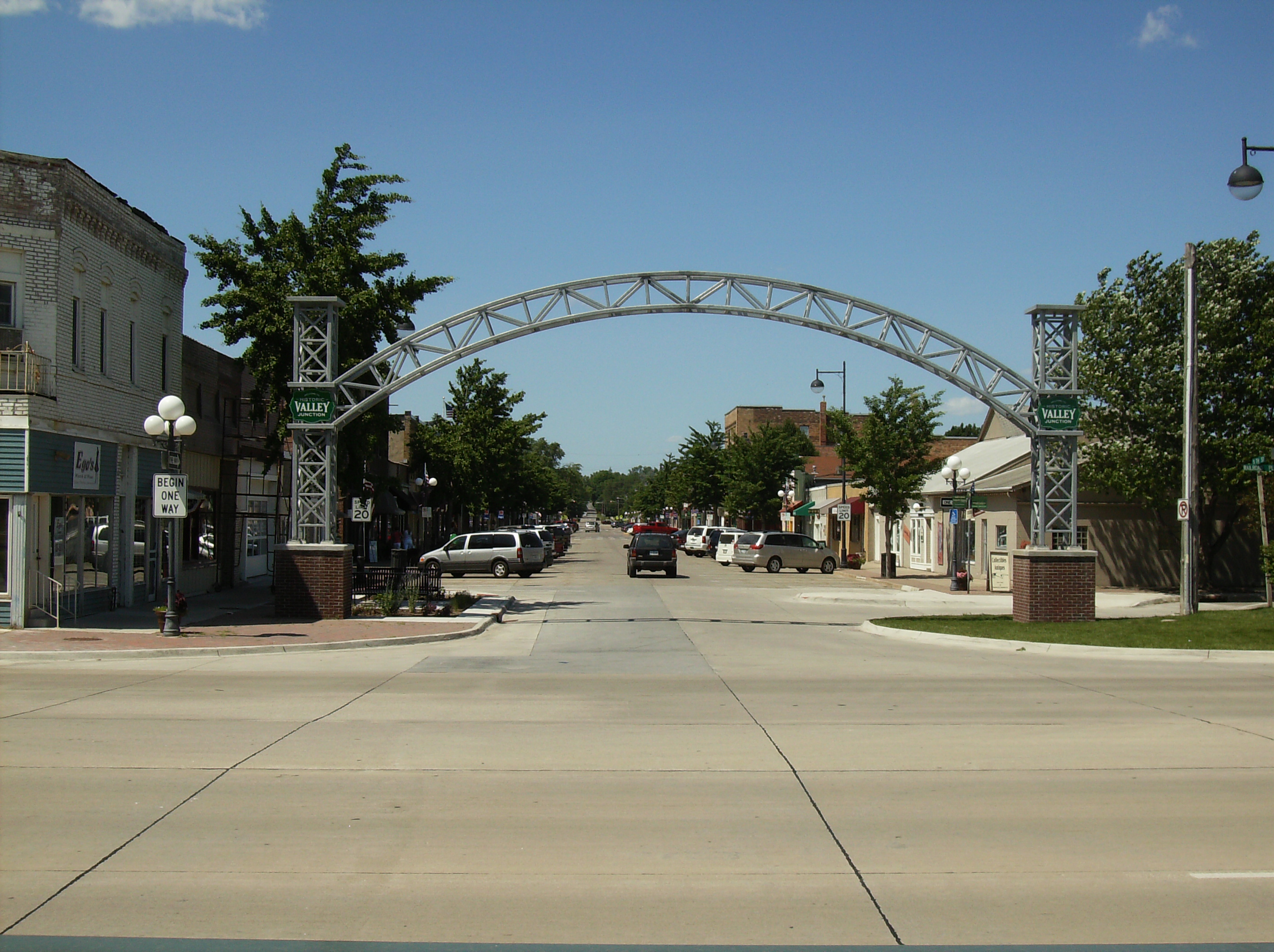
- Valley Junction

- Flag

- Location in Iowa

- Location in the United States
- Coordinates: 41°30′34″N 93°46′50″W
- Country: United States
- State: Iowa
- Counties: Polk, Dallas, Warren, Madison
- Townships: Walnut, Bloomfield, Boone, Linn, Lee
- Incorporated: October 9, 1893

Government
  - Mayor: Russ Trimble
  - Mayor pro tem: Greg Hudson
  - City council: Renee Hardman; Doug Loots; Matthew McKinney; Kevin Trevillyan
  - City manager: Tom Hadden
  - U.S. Congress: Zach Nunn (R)

Area
  - City: 48.22 sq mi (124.88 km^{2})
  - Land: 47.24 sq mi (122.34 km^{2})
  - Water: 0.98 sq mi (2.54 km^{2})
- Elevation: 955 ft (291 m)

Population (2020)
  - City: 68,723
  - Rank: US: 554th IA: 6th
  - Density: 1,454.8/sq mi (561.72/km^{2})
  - Metro: 655,409 (87th)
- Time zone: UTC−6 (CST)
  - Summer (DST): UTC−5 (CDT)
- ZIP code: 50263-50266
- Area code: 515
- FIPS code: 19-83910
- GNIS feature ID: 2397266
- Public Transit
- Website: www.wdm.iowa.gov

West Des Moines is a city in Iowa, United States. Most of the city is in Polk County, some of it is in Dallas County, and small portions extend into Warren and Madison Counties.

The city population was 68,723 as of the 2020 census, and according to 2025 census estimates, the city is estimated to have a population of 74,224. West Des Moines is the third most populous city in the Des Moines metropolitan area and the seventh most populous city in Iowa.

== History ==
=== Settlement and early history ===
The West Des Moines area used to be home to the Sac and Meskwaki peoples. Near the stroke of midnight on October 11, 1845, a gunshot was fired by a cattle farmer, James Cunningham Jordan (1813–1891) to declare that the area was open for Anglo-European settlement. His residence, the Jordan House, has been restored and is now an historical home museum and home to the West Des Moines Historical Society. The Jordan House was a stop on the Underground Railroad, and abolitionist John Brown visited the Jordan property multiple times, at least once while escorting a group of freedom-seeking enslaved people to Canada. In West Des Moines' early years, the town was a trading and shipping junction. West Des Moines incorporated as the city of Valley Junction on October 9, 1893.

In its early days, Valley Junction was home to the Chicago, Rock Island and Pacific Railroad's switching facilities and repair shops due to its location at the junction of several railroad lines. The Rock Island's facilities moved out of Valley Junction and back into Des Moines in 1936.

The speed limit of ten miles (16 km) an hour had existed for all automobiles Valley Junction since 1911. However, 1915 an Englishman named Jack Prince built a one-mile (1.6 km) oval race track, designed to let race cars break that speed limit ten times over. The wooden track was made of 980,000 feet (300,000 m) of 2x4's laid on edge. It was one of 24 such tracks nationwide; it had seating for over 10,000 people. On August 7, 1915, the eyes of the auto world were on Valley Junction in anticipation of the fastest 300-mile (480 km) auto race in history. Ralph DePalma, winner of the Indianapolis 500 that year, was one of at least a dozen drivers vying for the $10,000 purse. Before a crowd of 7,000 people, a tire blew, lunging Joe Cooper's car over the rail. Cooper was killed and his mechanic was injured. Later while rounding a curb, a wheel of Billy Chandler's Duesenberg failed, cartwheeling the car into the infield and fatally injuring his mechanic, Maurice Keeler. Chandler was seriously injured. Smiling Ralph Mulford won the race with DePalma a close 2nd. This baptism by blood left a bad taste in the mouth of the locals, and the track was closed two years later. The wood was salvaged and then used to construct buildings in Valley Junction.

The serious dilemma of school overcrowding was partially addressed in 1916. The bond issue to build a new high school for $50,000 was approved by a two-to-one vote. The similar new grade school issue was defeated soundly. Building commenced and by September of the following year, the doors of the new Valley High School were opened at 8th and Hillside. As a part of the school board policy, only first-class college-educated teachers were hired. By 1919, the rooms of the new high school were filled. A new junior high school was proposed, approved, and completed by the fall of 1923.

The new school was the only bright spot in the otherwise uncertain dreary years of 1922 and 1923. The foundations of the city were shaken by a 22-month-machinist strike at the Rock Island shops. Starting 1922-07-01, 600 workers were idled. The railroad company reacted by bringing replacement workers into town to break the strike. The replacements were mostly Mexican and African-American laborers brought up from Oklahoma by R. C. Hyde, the master mechanic at the shops. For their own protection, they lived in boxcars and tiny houses in an area south of Railroad Avenue and west of the main rail yards. The area was dubbed "Hyde Park" by the strikers. The resulting hardships suffered by the idled workers led the most desperate to choose between breaking the strike or letting their family starve. It was a time which pitted neighbor against neighbor, tearing at the fabric of the community. Two men shot themselves in desperation before the strike ended.

Valley Junction officially become a dry town in 1915. In 1922, the Keystone Coal Factory closed. The Des Moines Golf and Country Club left Des Moines in 1923 and moved to White Pole Road auto trail. By the late 1920s, workers of Valley Junction were suffering from the Depression because the railroads were abandoning track there.

=== New name ===
By 1937, only two trains stopped daily; the sagging business climate needed a boost. Members of the commercial club believed the only way to attract new industries would be to change the name of the city. They thought the name "Valley Junction" conveyed the image of an old-fashioned and backward town to prospective employers and residents. The name of "West Des Moines" would give it the respectability and prestige the town desperately needed. There was a precedent by way of an editorial in the Valley Junction Express in 1905 that suggested dropping "Junction" from the name, but nothing came of it. The opposition feared the change to West Des Moines would cause property owners to be taxed the same as Des Moines. It was also declared as a step toward annexation by Des Moines. A third and final election was held on December 7, 1937.

On January 1, 1938, the name "Valley Junction" was relegated to the past, and the new city of West Des Moines took the first steps to a new identity. Helping to establish this new identity, the most identifiable trait was the suspension of all property taxes between 1936 and 1938. This was due to the profits of the water department. Today the original business district of West Des Moines has been preserved as Historic Valley Junction. It features many locally owned specialty shops and restaurants as well as a weekly farmers' market.

Though the name was changed, the community's commitment to education was bolstered by funds from the Public Works Administration. Despite the Depression, a new elementary school and the Old Valley Football Stadium were built and dedicated on May 24, 1939, at 8th and Hillside. The venerable Lincoln School was razed in 1938 to make way for the new building. Longfellow was retired in 1939 and then sold in 1940 for $1000. In 1955, West Des Moines Elementary School at Walnut and 6th was renamed "Nellie Phenix Elementary" in honor of the former principal. The late 1930s were very good years in the school's athletic teams, producing memorable names: True, Gavin, Swink, and Sherbo. Charles Swink was a multi-record holder in track and field. His record at the Drake Relays stood for twenty years.

An overgrown concrete eyesore on Ashworth Road soon became the musical mecca for the surrounding area on June 6, 1939, when Tom Archer opened the Val Air Ballroom. The site was originally the location of the stillborn Wilson Rubber company factory. Intended to bolster World War I tire production, the end of the war in 1918 left only a large concrete slab. Patrons of the Val Air could dance under a canopy of stars to the melodious sounds of Guy Lombardo, Benny Goodman, Glenn Miller, and other big bands. The war years brought new vitality to the community without a cost.

Then and now, flooding frequently dampens, but has not broken the residents' spirits. Unpredictable waters of the Raccoon River and Walnut Creek have often exceeded their banks due to large amounts of rain in the summer and snowmelt in the spring, filling the streets and damaging homes and businesses.

=== 1950 to the present ===
In 1950, West Des Moines had a population of 5,615, but the city grew as many new housing subdivisions were built. West Des Moines annexed the neighboring community of Clover Hills in 1950, the town of Ashawa, a former Rock Island railroad stop, in 1957, and the town of Commerce, along the Raccoon River, in 1960. City government also grew, and when the venerable city hall could not keep up with the city's expansion, the city opened a new municipal building in 1954. With the influx of students, the school district's ever-expanding borders continually compromised classroom capacity. Children attended school in former homes near Phenix, with classes in hallways and living rooms. Space was even rented from the new Catholic grade school. In 1959 alone, 150–200 new homes were built, adding to the population's growth. The construction of Interstate 35, Interstate 80, and Interstate 235 in the 1960s brought more people and businesses to West Des Moines. This construction also caused the Des Moines Golf and Country Club to sell its location along Ashworth Road and 8th Street and then move to its current location in Dallas County. In 1966, Dowling Catholic High School/St. Joseph Educational Center purchased 55-acre (22 ha) from the Des Moines Golf and Country Club and, subsequently, moved from Des Moines and opened at its current location, 1400 Buffalo Road, in the fall of 1972. Several retail and office complexes opened along the I-235 corridor after the freeway's completion, including Valley West Mall, which opened in 1975. West Des Moines' population jumped from 11,964 in 1960 to 31,702 in 1990.

West Des Moines expanded into Dallas County during the 1990s and 2000s, once again placing the premier golf courses of the Des Moines Golf and Country Club in its city limits and punctuated by the opening of one of the best golf courses in Iowa at the Glen Oaks Country Club (Note: Both the golf courses at the Des Moines Golf and Country Club and at the Glen Oaks Country Club have been ranked consistently in the top ten golf courses in Iowa. In 2011, the course at Glen Oaks was named the #1 golf course in the State of Iowa by Golf Digest.) along with the West Glen Town Center and the largest in the state of Iowa, Jordan Creek Town Center and shopping mall in 2004. Major commercial construction is underway around the area, including the opening of many additional hotels, shopping centers, and office buildings, including a new Wells Fargo corporate campus. In 2005, West Des Moines annexed land in Warren County for the first time. Seeing the land to the south of Des Moines as extremely valuable, especially with the completion of a major "South-Belt Freeway" system, the cities of Norwalk and West Des Moines are actively competing for land in the northern part of Warren County. From 1990 to 2015, West Des Moines is the fastest growing city in Iowa according to the landmass.

During the 1990s, a new city/school campus opened near the intersection of South 35th Street and Mills Civic Parkway. West Des Moines' new police station opened in April 1992. This was followed by the opening of a new public library in 1996; the library served as a temporary home for West Des Moines' city hall until a new building was dedicated in late 2002. The campus also features a new stadium for Valley High School that also opened in 2002. On the same property, the West Des Moines School district operates Valley Southwoods, a freshman high school with over 600 students that opened in 1996. Turning the West Des Moines Community Schools into a two high school district was not acceptable. In 2004, August Hillside Elementary opened on the former site of Hillside Junior High and Old Valley Stadium, which was demolished in 2001. In 2012, Clegg Park Elementary was renovated and opened as the new Walnut Creek Campus which is the district's alternative high school. Major renovation and additions were completed at Valley High in 2007 and again in 2015.

== Geography ==
According to the United States Census Bureau, the city has an area of 39.48 square miles (102.25 km^{2}), of which 38.59 square miles (99.95 km^{2}) is land and 0.89 square miles (2.31 km^{2}) is water. West Des Moines's location in the Raccoon River valley has left parts of it, particularly the Valley Junction area, prone to flooding. After the Great Flood of 1993, a floodwall was constructed along Walnut Creek (near the boundary with Des Moines) to protect that area.

=== Climate ===
West Des Moines has a humid continental climate (Köppen climate classification Dfa).

Climate data for West Des Moines
Month	Jan	Feb	Mar	Apr	May	Jun	Jul	Aug	Sep	Oct	Nov	Dec	Year
Mean daily maximum °F (°C)	26 (−3)	36 (2)	48 (9)	61 (16)	72 (22)	82 (28)	86 (30)	84 (29)	76 (24)	63 (17)	47 (8)	33 (1)	60 (16)
Mean daily minimum °F (°C)	12 (−11)	18 (−8)	29 (−2)	40 (4)	51 (11)	61 (16)	66 (19)	64 (18)	54 (12)	42 (6)	29 (−2)	17 (−8)	40 (4)
Average precipitation inches (mm)	1.03 (26)	1.19 (30)	2.21 (56)	3.58 (91)	4.25 (108)	4.57 (116)	4.18 (106)	4.51 (115)	3.15 (80)	2.62 (67)	2.10 (53)	1.33 (34)	34.72 (882)
Source: Weather Channel

=== Street numbering ===
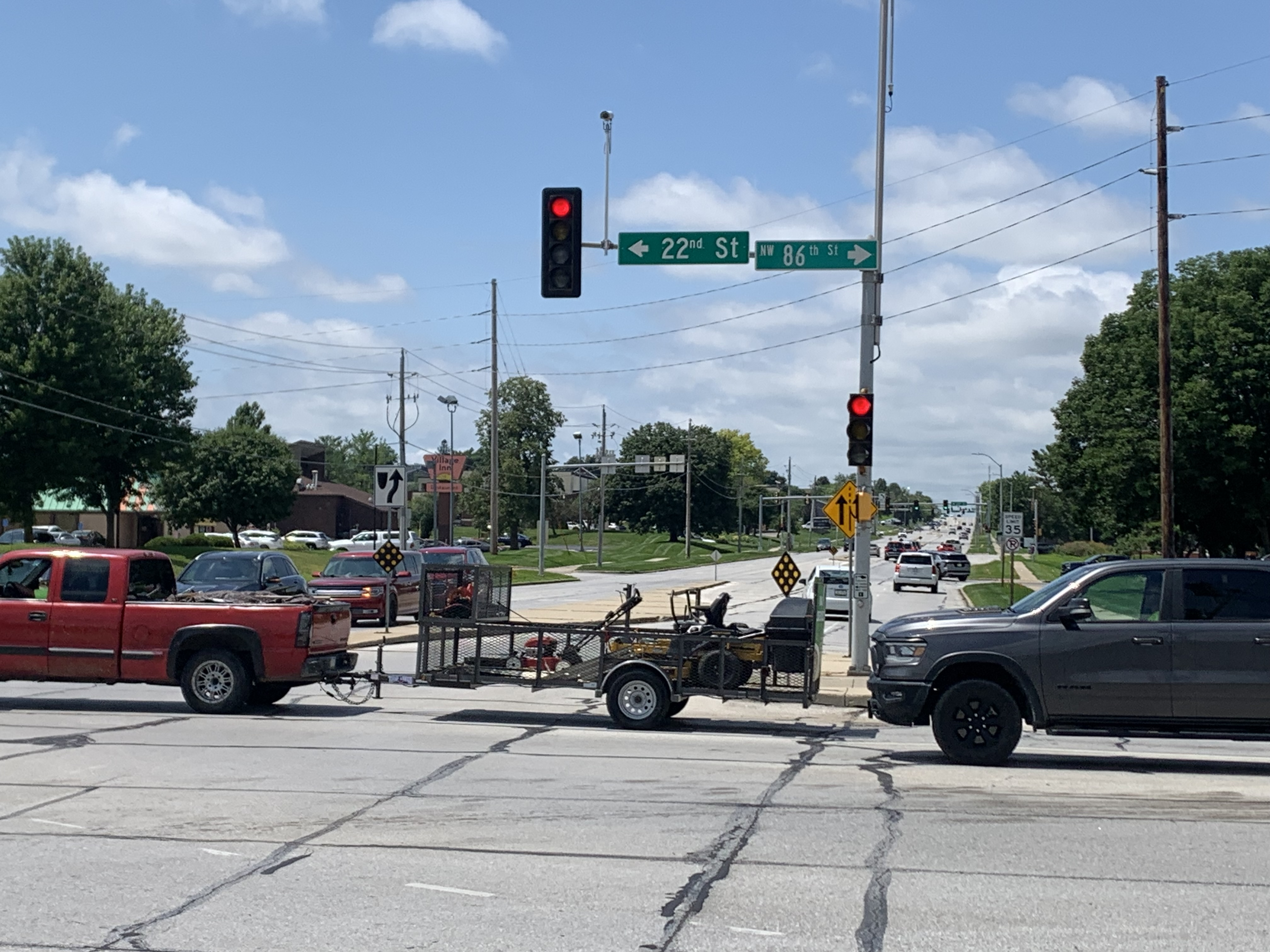
Street Name change at University Avenue in West Des Moines, Iowa

While nearby Clive, Urbandale, and Windsor Heights use the same street numbers for north–south streets that Des Moines uses, West Des Moines has its own street numbering system. Thus, 86th Street in Clive and Urbandale becomes 22nd Street in West Des Moines. Iowa Highway 28, which forms most of the boundary between Des Moines and West Des Moines, is 63rd Street in Des Moines but 1st Street in West Des Moines. Many of the east–west streets share the same name with Des Moines, although the numbering of these east–west streets starts over in West Des Moines.

== Demographics ==
Historical population
Census	Pop.	Note	%±
1900	1,700		—
1910	2,573		51.4%
1920	3,631		41.1%
1930	4,280		17.9%
1940	4,252		−0.7%
1950	5,615		32.1%
1960	11,949		112.8%
1970	16,441		37.6%
1980	21,894		33.2%
1990	31,702		44.8%
2000	46,403		46.4%
2010	56,609		22.0%
2020	68,723		21.4%
2025 (est.)	74,224		8.0%
U.S. Decennial Census

=== Income ===
The median income for a household in the city was $54,139, and the median income for a family was $70,600 (in a 2008 estimate, these figures had risen to $61,256 and $83,800 respectively, in 2008 inflation-adjusted dollars). Males had a median income of $45,185 versus $31,555 for females. The per capita income for the city was $31,405. 2.8% of families and 4.5% of the population were below the poverty line, including 4.3% of those under the age of 18 and 3.0% of those 65 and older.

=== 2020 census ===
As of the 2020 census, West Des Moines had a population of 68,723. The median age was 35.3 years. 6.6% of residents were under the age of 5, 22.5% were under 18, and 14.2% were 65 years of age or older. The population was 50.3% male and 49.7% female. For every 100 females there were 94.4 males, and for every 100 females age 18 and over there were 92.3 males age 18 and over.

98.4% of residents lived in urban areas, while 1.6% lived in rural areas.

There were 30,094 households in West Des Moines, of which 28.1% had children under the age of 18 living in them. Of all households, 43.8% were married-couple households, 20.2% were households with a male householder and no spouse or partner present, and 28.4% were households with a female householder and no spouse or partner present. The average household size was 2.19, and 33.9% of all households were made up of individuals with 10.0% having someone living alone who was 65 years of age or older.

There were 32,200 housing units, of which 6.5% were vacant. The homeowner vacancy rate was 1.5% and the rental vacancy rate was 9.3%.

Racial composition as of the 2020 census
Race	Number	Percent
White	53,697	78.1%
Black or African American	3,734	5.4%
American Indian and Alaska Native	205	0.3%
Asian	4,814	7.0%
Native Hawaiian and Other Pacific Islander	39	0.1%
Some other race	1,596	2.3%
Two or more races	4,638	6.7%
Hispanic or Latino (of any race)	4,568	6.6%

=== 2010 census ===
As of the census of 2010, there were 56,609 people, 24,311 households, and 14,201 families residing in the city. The population density was 1,466.9 inhabitants per square mile (566.4/km^{2}). There were 26,219 housing units at an average density of 679.4 per square mile (262.3/km^{2}). The racial makeup of the city was 88.4% White, 3.3% African American, 0.2% Native American, 4.8% Asian, 1.5% from other races, and 1.9% from two or more races. Hispanic or Latino of any race were 5.2% of the population.

There were 24,311 households, of which 30.6% had children under the age of 18 living with them, 46.4% were married couples living together, 8.6% had a female householder with no husband present, 3.4% had a male householder with no wife present, and 41.6% were non-families. 31.2% of all households were made up of individuals, and 7.4% had someone living alone who was 65 years of age or older. The average household size was 2.32 and the average family size was 2.98.

The median age in the city was 33.5 years. 24.1% of residents were under the age of 18; 9.2% were between the ages of 18 and 24; 32.6% were from 25 to 44; 23.4% were from 45 to 64; and 10.6% were 65 years of age or older. The gender makeup of the city was 48.3% male and 51.7% female.

=== 2000 census ===
As of the census of 2000, there were 46,403 people, 19,826 households, and 11,915 families residing in the city. The population density was 1,732.5 inhabitants per square mile (668.9/km^{2}). There were 20,815 housing units at an average density of 777.1 per square mile (300.0/km^{2}). The racial makeup of the city was 92.66% White, 1.87% African American, 0.13% Native American, 2.76% Asian, 0.03% Pacific Islander, 1.26% from other races, and 1.29% from two or more races. Hispanic or Latino of any race were 3.03% of the population.

There were 19,826 households, out of which 30.3% had children under the age of 18 living with them, 50.0% were married couples living together, 7.7% had a female householder with no husband present, and 39.9% were non-families. 30.5% of all households were made up of individuals, and 7.1% had someone living alone who was 65 years of age or older. The average household size was 2.33 and the average family size was 2.98.

The age distribution was 24.7% under the age of 18, 9.7% from 18 to 24, 35.5% from 25 to 44, 20.3% from 45 to 64, and 9.8% who were 65 years of age or older. The median age was 33 years. For every 100 females, there were 92.0 males. For every 100 females age 18 and over, there were 87.9 males.

== Economy ==
Hy-Vee, FBL Financial Group, GuideOne Insurance, American Equity, Sammons Financial Group, ITA Group, Windsor Windows & Doors and the Iowa Foundation for Medical Care are headquartered in West Des Moines. Other large employers include ADP, Goodrich and Wells Fargo's Card Services and Home Mortgage divisions. Wells Fargo recently completed its corporate campus south of Jordan Creek Town Center that is the home of their Home Mortgage and Consumer Finance divisions. Microsoft maintains several data centers in West Des Moines including, as of September 2023, its most advanced supercomputer because heat from the supercomputer can be vented with outside air when air temperatures are below 29.3 °C (84.7 °F) and thus significantly reduce the amount of water used for cooling. This location supported training for ChatGPT.

=== Top employers ===
According to West Des Moines' 2023 Annual Comprehensive Financial Report, the top employers in the city are:

#	Employer	# of employees
1	Wells Fargo Home Mortgage & Credit Services	9,000
2	Athene USA Corporation	1,665
3	Hy-Vee	1,594
4	West Des Moines Community School District	1,424
5	FBL Financial Group	1,016
6	American Equity Investment Life Insurance Company	889
7	Sammons Financial Group	753
8	The Iowa Clinic	669
9	Microsoft	630
10	ITA Group Inc.	482

== Government ==
West Des Moines uses the mayor-council form of government with a city manager appointed by the city council. The council consists of the mayor, two at-large members, and three members from each of the city's three wards. The mayor and all council members serve four-year terms. Rick Messerschmidt served as the interim mayor of the city following former mayor Eugene Meyer's resignation in January 2007; On April 17, Steve Gaer was elected mayor during a special election and held that position until Russ Trimble was elected Mayor in November 2021. Tom Hadden is the city manager of West Des Moines.

== Education ==
The West Des Moines Community School District has eight elementary schools, two junior high schools, and one high school (Valley), with a second high school for freshmen only (Valley Southwoods) and an alternative high school (Walnut Creek Campus). Parts of Clive, Urbandale, and Windsor Heights are also in the West Des Moines School District. The Dallas County portion of West Des Moines is part of the Waukee Community School District; three of that district's ten elementary schools are in West Des Moines. Private schools in West Des Moines include Dowling Catholic High School and Iowa Christian Academy from 1999 till its closing in 2019. Valley High School moved to its present location in 1967. Before that, it was in a three-story brick building at 8th and Hillside. It was built in 1917 and torn down in 1979.

== Transportation ==
Des Moines Area Regional Transit provides public transit service to the city via multiple bus routes.

== Notable people ==
- Cindy Axne, congresswoman
- Matt Bullard, basketball player
- Caitlin Clark, basketball player, all-time NCAA women's basketball points leader
- Corwin Clatt, football player
- Jared Clauss, football player
- Liang Chow, head coach of US women's gymnastic team at the 2008 Summer Olympics
- Gabby Douglas, gymnast and 2012 Olympic gold medalist
- Jerry Groom, football player
- Justin Hartwig, football player
- Peter Hedges, novelist, screenwriter, director
- Dan Jennings, baseball player
- Shawn Johnson, gymnast and 2008 Olympic gold medalist
- Karlos Kirby, bobsledder
- Mary Madison, Iowa state representative
- Mike McCoy, amateur golfer
- Mason Mitchell, racing driver
- Carl Pohlad, billionaire businessman, owned Minnesota Twins.
- Scott Pose, baseball player
- Brent Roske, TV/ film producer
- Tyson Smith, football player

== See also ==
- Hy-Line International
