= PlainsCapital Bank =

Bank

- Type: Public
- Traded as: NYSE: HTH
- Industry: Banking
- Founded: 1988 in Lubbock, Texas, US
- Headquarters: Dallas, Texas, United States
- Key people: Jeremy B. Ford (Chairman & CEO), Brian L. Heflin (President)
- Total assets: $12.4 Billion
- Number of employees: 1,050
- Website: www.plainscapital.com

PlainsCapital Bank, a subsidiary of Hilltop Holdings Inc., is one of the largest independent banks in Texas with approximately $12.4 billion in assets. PlainsCapital operates 55 branches in Austin, Corpus Christi, Dallas, Fort Worth, Houston, Lubbock, San Antonio and the Rio Grande Valley. The bank, which is led by Chairman and CEO Jeremy B. Ford, employs about 1,050 people.

== History ==
The bank was founded as Plains National Bank by Alan B. White, former chairman and CEO, in 1988 in Lubbock, Texas USA. In 1999, it expanded with a branch in Dallas, and acquired Dallas-based residential mortgage lender PrimeLending. The bank added branches in other major Texas markets throughout the 2000s. In 2003, the bank changed its name to PlainsCapital Bank.

Today, PlainsCapital Bank operates as a subsidiary of Hilltop Holdings, with PrimeLending as its main subsidiary.

=== Timeline ===
- 1988 – PlainsCapital Corporation acquires Plains National Bank in Lubbock.
- 2003 – Plains National Bank undergoes name change to PlainsCapital Bank.
- 2012 – The bank merges with Hilltop Holdings Inc., a Dallas-based financial services holding company.
- 2013 – The bank acquires First National Bank of Edinburg with an FDIC-assisted transaction.
- 2015 – The bank’s parent company, Hilltop Holdings, enters into a merger agreement with SWS Group. SWS's banking subsidiary – Southwest Securities, FSB – becomes a part of the bank.
- 2018 – The bank’s parent company, Hilltop Holdings, acquires Houston-based The Bank of River Oaks.
- 2024 – Jeremy B. Ford is named CEO of PlainsCapital Bank, and Brian Heflin is named President.

== Services ==
PlainsCapital Bank conducts commercial and consumer banking in the state of Texas. The bank is a member of the Federal Deposit Insurance Corporation (FDIC) and states it is an Equal Housing Lender. The bank offers:

- Commercial lending and other commercial banking services
- Treasury management
- Small business banking
- Private banking
- Trust and wealth management services
- Consumer banking
