= Interstate 235 (Iowa) =

Highway in Iowa

Interstate 235
- John MacVicar Freeway
- I-235 highlighted in red

Route information
- Auxiliary route of I-35
- Maintained by Iowa DOT
- Length: 13.78 mi (22.18 km)
- Existed: December 14, 1961–present
- NHS: Entire route

Major junctions
- West end: I-35 / I-80 in West Des Moines
- US 69 in Des Moines; US 6 in Des Moines
- East end: I-35 / I-80 in Ankeny

Location
- Country: United States
- State: Iowa
- Counties: Polk

Highway system
- Interstate Highway System; Main; Auxiliary; Suffixed; Business; Future; Iowa Primary Highway System; Interstate; US; State; Secondary; Scenic
← Iowa 224	→ US 275

Interstate 235 (I-235) in Iowa is an auxiliary Interstate Highway that runs just north of downtown Des Moines through the heart of the Des Moines metropolitan area. I-235 runs from the junction of I-35 and I-80 in West Des Moines to the separation of the same two Interstates in Ankeny. The highway is approximately 14 miles (23 km) long.

I-235, which had seen little improvement since its construction in the 1960s, was completely rebuilt and widened in a project that spanned most of the 2000s. Prior to the reconstruction, I-235 had two lanes in each direction with a third lane near downtown; the entire route now has at least three lanes of traffic in each direction, with an additional one or two lanes closer to the heart of the city. The modernized freeway now handles on average between 75,000 and 125,000 vehicles per day, making it the busiest highway in the state of Iowa.

== Route description ==
I-235 begins at the western intersection of I-35 and I-80, known locally as the West Mixmaster. Here, eastbound I-80 exits the highway, which becomes I-235 and joins northbound I-35. From the West interchange, I-235 heads east. Almost immediately is a half diamond interchange with 50th Street in West Des Moines at exit 1A. One mile (1.6 km) later is a partial cloverleaf interchange at exit 1B with Valley West Drive, which was renamed from 35th Street in 1988 due to its proximity to Valley West Mall and Valley High School.

At Windsor Heights at a tight partial cloverleaf interchange, I-235 meets 73rd Street/8th Street at exit 3. The interchange is particularly tight because of an Iowa Interstate Railroad line just to the east. 73rd Street/8th Street are actually a single road: north of I-235, 73rd Street follows the Des Moines street numbering plan, while south of I-235, 8th Street follows the older street numbering plan of West Des Moines.

Midday traffic on I-235

At the Iowa Highway 28 (Iowa 28)/63rd Street interchange (exit 4), I-235 picks up a fourth lane of eastbound travel and drops a lane westbound. Now within the city limits of Des Moines, it passes through the heavily wooded Waterbury neighborhood. Near the 42nd Street interchange (exit 5B, I-235 curves to the south around Theodore Roosevelt High School. An interchange with 31st Street is 0.5 miles (0.80 km) later at exit 6, which provides access to Drake University to the north, and to Terrace Hill, the governor's mansion, to the south.

East of 31st Street, I-235 briefly picks up a fifth lane and drops a lane westbound, creating a 10-lane freeway just west of downtown. This stretch of freeway receives, on average, over 125,000 vehicles per day, making it the busiest stretch of road in the state.

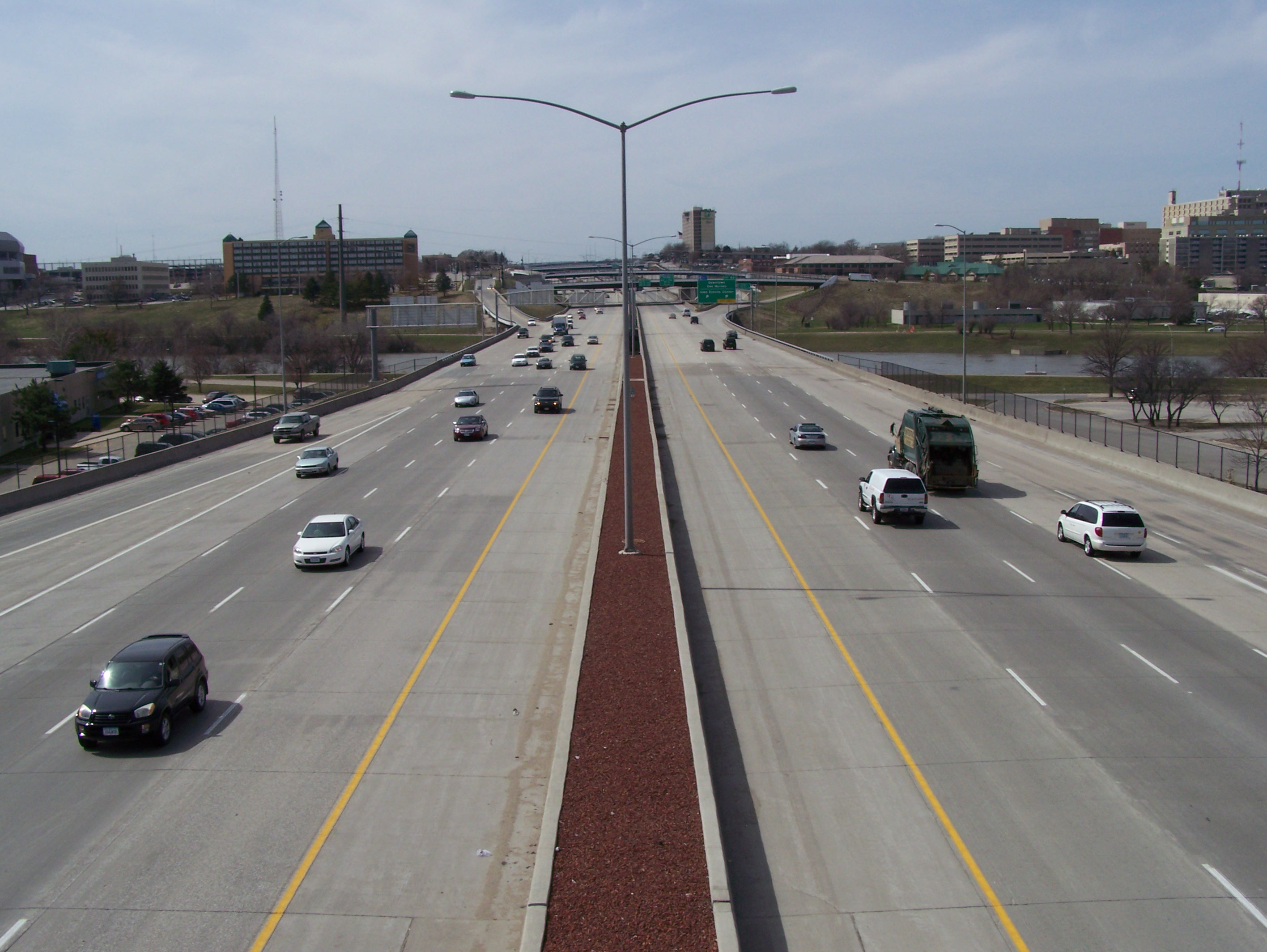
I-235 crosses the Des Moines River in downtown Des Moines.

There are three eastbound interchanges connecting I-235 to downtown Des Moines. From exit 7A, Martin Luther King Jr. Parkway and 19th Street, a pair of oneway streets, lead traffic to the west of downtown. From exit 7B, Keosauqua Way, known locally as Keo Way, enters downtown from the northwest. These interchanges are combined westbound at exit 7. Closer to the Des Moines River, a combined interchange in each direction (exit 8A) filters off the rest of downtown traffic to two destinations: 7th Street and 6th Avenue and 3rd Street and 2nd Avenue, each of which are pairs of oneway streets. The fourth lane of traffic drops off at this combined interchange.

At the Des Moines River, I-235 passes Casey's Center, the main Iowa Events Center facility, which lies to the south along the western bank and the Greater Des Moines Botanical Garden to the north on the eastern bank. On the eastside of Des Moines, it skirts the northern edge of the East Village, the Iowa State Capitol, and East High School before the interchange with U.S. Highway 69 (US 69) at East 14th Street and East 15th Street . One mile (1.6 km) east is an interchange with Iowa 163/East University Avenue at exit 10A. Up to now, East University Avenue had been relatively parallel to I-235. It also provides access to the Iowa State Fairgrounds for northbound I-35 and eastbound I-80 traffic.

At Iowa 163, I-235 begins curving to the north, dividing an industrial district to the west and residential areas to the east. It intersects US 6/East Euclid Avenue at a partial cloverleaf interchange (exit 12) 1.5 miles (2.4 km) to the north. It continues north for another 1.5 miles (2.4 km) until it meets I-35 and I-80 again at the East interchange.

== History ==
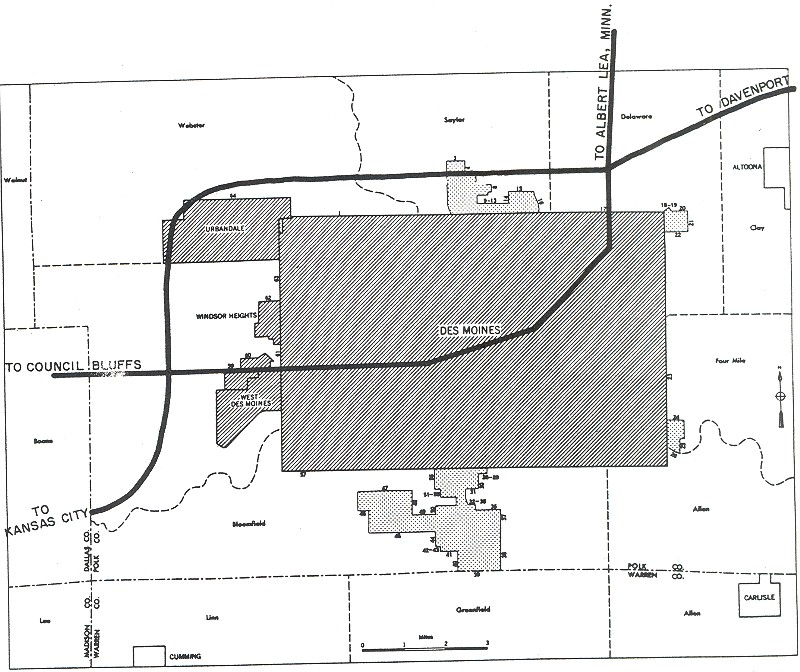
The current route of I-235 closely follows the original plans from 1955, seen here.

The first section of I-235 to open, from Cottage Grove Avenue to Keo Way, opened on December 14, 1961. Over the next seven years, sections of I-235 opened, spreading east and west toward the interchanges until it was completed on October 30, 1968. Construction of the freeway required the acquisition of 1,650 parcels, the demolition of three schools and seven churches, and closure of the original Des Moines Golf and Country Club.

In October 1963, the Des Moines City Council designated I-235 the John MacVicar Freeway in honor of two former mayors of Des Moines: John MacVicar Sr. (1896–1900, 1916–1918, 1928) and John MacVicar Jr. (1942–1948). However, this name is seldom used; most people simply refer to it as I-235.

In March 2002, a six-year-long project to completely rebuild I-235 and the bridges which cross it began. The first two years consisted of rebuilding most of the bridges which cross it, starting with 42nd Street in West Des Moines. The final four years of the project entailed finishing the remaining bridges and widening, regrading, and repaving the entire length of the highway.

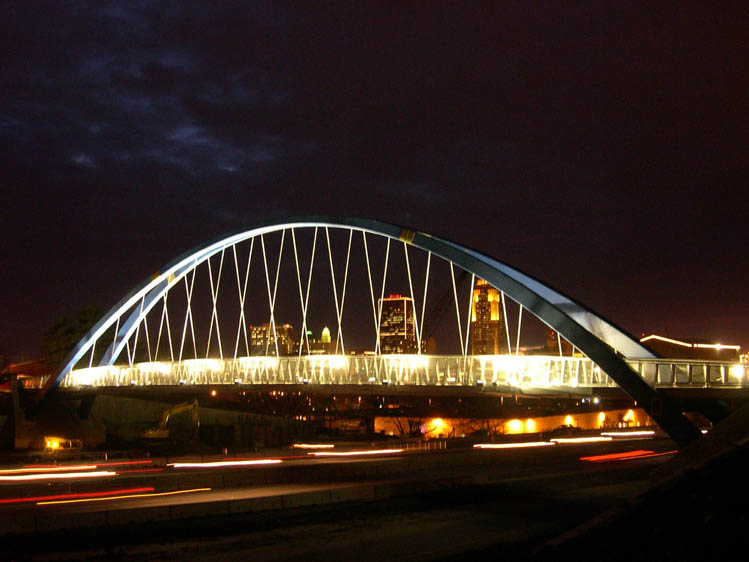
The Edna M. Griffin Memorial Bridge

=== Pedestrian bridges ===
An additional part of the highway improvement plan were three pedestrian bridges, located at 40th, 44th, and East 6th streets. The three bridges were replacements for bridges which were too narrow to accommodate the newly widened highway. These highly visible bridges act as icons, locating the neighborhoods for travelers along the freeway. The design of the I-235 pedestrian bridges was completed by Boston-based bridge designer Miguel Rosales in collaboration with HNTB Engineering. The three bridges, the Edna M. Griffin Memorial Bridge (East 6th Street), the 40th Street Pedestrian Bridge, and the Rider Way Pedestrian Bridge (44th Street) were each completed by 2005.

The new design features basket-handle steel arches with clear spans of about 230 feet (70 meters). Inclined cables connect these blue steel arches to the prestressed concrete deck. Choosing a tied arch form allowed the Iowa Department of Transportation to keep traffic disruption to a minimum during construction. In addition, a custom curved screen system improves security while giving pedestrians and bicyclists a more attractive crossing experience. Together, these bridges create a distinct landmark unique to both the city and the state.

== Exit list ==
The entire route is in Polk County.

Location	mi	km	Exit	Destinations	Notes
West Des Moines	0.000	0.000	123	I-35 / I-80 – Council Bluffs, Omaha, Kansas City, Minneapolis, Chicago	Western terminus; exit number based on I-80 mileage; I-35 exit 72A, I-80 exit 123A; signed as exits 123A (south) and 123B (north/east); highway continues as I-80 west
West Des Moines	0.579	0.932	1A	50th Street – West Des Moines	Westbound exit and eastbound entrance
West Des Moines	1.317	2.120	1B	Valley West Drive – West Des Moines	Formerly 35th Street
West Des Moines	2.136	3.438	2	22nd Street – West Des Moines, Clive	
West Des Moines–Windsor Heights line	3.216	5.176	3	73rd Street north / 8th Street south – Windsor Heights, West Des Moines	
Windsor Heights–Des Moines line	3.826	6.157	4	Iowa 28 (63rd Street) – Windsor Heights	
Des Moines	4.333	6.973	5A	56th Street	Westbound exit and eastbound entrance only
Des Moines	5.342	8.597	5B	42nd Street – Art Center	
Des Moines	5.890	9.479	—	35th Street	Eastbound exit only, removed during reconstruction project
Des Moines	6.144	9.888	6	31st Street – Terrace Hill Historic Site	
Des Moines	6.780	10.911	—	Cottage Grove Avenue	Removed during reconstruction project
Des Moines	7.051– 7.388	11.347– 11.890	7	Martin Luther King, Jr. Parkway, 19th Street, Keosauqua Way – DSM Airport, Pappajohn Sculpture Park	Signed as exits 7A (MLK Jr. Pkwy./19th Ave.) and 7B (Keo. Way) eastbound
Des Moines	7.543	12.139	—	12th Street	Eastbound and westbound entrance only; removed during reconstruction project
Des Moines	7.727– 8.230	12.435– 13.245	8A	Downtown Des Moines, Iowa Events Center	Access to 2nd, 5th, and 6th Avenues and 3rd and 7th Streets
Des Moines	7.835	12.609	—	7th Street	Eastbound exit and westbound entrance only; reconfigured during reconstruction project
Des Moines	7.972	12.830	—	5th Avenue	No westbound entrance; reconfigured during reconstruction project
Des Moines	8.202	13.200	—	2nd Avenue, 3rd Street	Eastbound and westbound entrance only; reconfigured during reconstruction project
Des Moines	8.718	14.030	8B	E. 6th Street, Pennsylvania Avenue	
Des Moines	9.317– 9.631	14.994– 15.500	9	US 69 (E. 14th Street south / E. 15th Street north)	
Des Moines	10.070	16.206	10A	Iowa 163 (E. University Avenue) – State Fairgrounds	No eastbound exit to westbound Iowa 163, eastbound entrance to westbound I-235, or eastbound entrance
Des Moines	10.478	16.863	10B	To Iowa 163 (E. University Avenue) / Easton Boulevard	Eastbound exit and entrance only
Des Moines	11.241	18.091	11	Guthrie Avenue	
Des Moines	12.129	19.520	12	US 6 (E. Euclid Avenue) – Grand View University	
Ankeny	13.812	22.228	137	I-35 / I-80 – Davenport, Council Bluffs, Kansas City, Minneapolis	Eastern terminus; exit number based on I-80 mileage; I-80 exit 137A; signed as exits 137A (east) and 137B (south/west); highway continues as I-35 north
1.000 mi = 1.609 km; 1.000 km = 0.621 mi: Closed/former; Incomplete access
