= West Des Moines Community School District =

School district in West Des Moines, Iowa

Coordinates: 41.566261°N 93.757340°W

Location
- West Des Moines, Iowa Polk County and Dallas County United States
- Coordinates: 41.566261, -93.757340

District information
- Type: Local school district
- Grades: K-12
- Superintendent: Dr. Matt Adams
- Schools: 14
- Budget: $152,822,000 (2020-21)
- NCES District ID: 1930930

Students and staff
- Students: 9,225 (2022-23)
- Teachers: 607.23 FTE
- Staff: 629.59 FTE
- Student–teacher ratio: 15.19
- Athletic conference: Central Iowa Metro League
- District mascot: Tigers (Valley HS)
- Colors: Orange and Black (Valley HS)

Other information
- Website: www.wdmcs.org

West Des Moines Community School District, or West Des Moines Community Schools (WDMCS), is a public school district headquartered in West Des Moines, Iowa.

The district is mostly in Polk County, with a section in Dallas County. In addition to West Des Moines, the 36.6-square-mile (95 km^{2}) district serves sections of Clive, Urbandale, and Windsor Heights.

== Schools ==
High Schools:

- Valley High School (grades 10–12)
- Valley Southwoods Freshman High School (grade 9)

Alternative High School:

- Walnut Creek Campus (It clsoed as an individual school in 2026 but remains as a program)

Junior High Schools:

- Indian Hills Junior High School
- Stilwell Junior High School

Elementary schools:

- Clive Learning Academy
- Crestview School of Inquiry
- Crossroads Park Elementary
- Fairmeadows Elementary
- Hillside Elementary
- Jordan Creek Elementary
- Western Hills Elementary
- Westridge Elementary
