= Niagara Conservation =

- Type: Private
- Industry: Manufacturing, Plumbing
- Founded: 1977
- Founder: William Cutler
- Headquarters: Flower Mound, Texas, U.S.
- Products: toilets, showerheads, aerators, lighting fixtures, caulks, sealants, and weatherization products
- Website: http://www.niagaracorp.com

Niagara Conservation is a manufacturing company based in Fort Worth, Texas best known for its plumbing products and its water conservation efforts. Niagara Conservation also manufactures lighting fixtures, light bulbs, caulks, sealants, and weatherization products.

== History ==
Niagara Conservation was established in 1974 by William Cutler.

== Product innovation ==
Niagara Conservation manufactures water-reducing, green products including toilets, aerators, and showerheads.

In 2009, the company released the Stealth toilet, which used a new technology combining air and water to flush liquids and solids with only 0.8 gallons of water. Niagara's Stealth is currently the only single flush 0.8 gallons per flush (GPF) toilet in the world. The Stealth's ultra-high-efficiency low-flow toilet uses newly engineered technology where an air transfer system pressurizes the bowl's trap-way to flush quietly with limited water usage. All Stealth toilets are certified by the U.S. Environmental Protection Agency’s WaterSense program.

Niagara Conservation also manufactures the Flapperless toilet, which uses a half-cylinder 1.6 gallon bucket instead of a flapper. When the toilet is flushed, the bucket dumps the water into the tank, initiating the flush. The flapper is the piece of common toilet technology that fails most often, without a flapper, a toilet is less likely to fail.

== Water conservation ==
In 2013, Niagara Conservation received the Environmental Protection Agency (EPA) WaterSense Manufacturer Partner of the Year award for helping to increase water efficiency and awareness. Niagara received a similar award in 2011 for contributions to conservation initiatives. Niagara has 30 products that are EPA certified, including the Stealth and Eco-Logic toilets, the Earth, Prismiere and Sava showerheads and the Dual Thread Faucet Aerator.

== Municipality and utility partnerships ==
In 2004, Niagara Conservation and Austin Water offered the residents of Austin, Texas the chance to replace their toilets with high-efficiency toilets through the city’s Free Toilet Program. If residents received their water from Austin or an eligible metropolitan utility district, they could replace up to three toilets with Niagara EcoLogic high-efficiency flapperless toilets. The program also offered rebates for purchasing high-efficiency toilets.

In 2009, Niagara Conservation partnered with Fort Worth’s Water Conservation Section to provide free installation of high efficiency pre-rinse spray nozzles and aerators for local foodservice providers to reduce water consumption. The "SpraySmart" program replaced nozzles that use over three gallons of hot water per minute with Niagara nozzles that use 1.28 gallons per minute.

In 2011, the Elsinore Valley Municipal Water District in Lake Elsinore, California launched a free water conservation program that replaced old toilets with Niagara Conservation's Stealth System to save water. The program is currently in its first phase.

In 2012, Niagara Conservation donated 1.0 GPF toilets to the Boys & Girls Clubs of Monterey County to help combat the club's rising water bills. The club previously paid up to $800 a month for water.

In September 2015 California Water Service announced it will begin offering free High-Efficiency Toilets to their customers in California. Cal Water will provide residential customers who have existing toilets using 1.6 gallons per flush or greater with a Niagara Stealth high-efficiency toilets that use 0.8 gallons per flush. Free toilets will be available while supplies last. The homeowner will have to arrange to have the toilet(s) installed and dispose or arrange recycling of their old toilet(s). Since some old toilets use up to 8.0 gallons of water per flush this program is expected to save up to 50 gallons per day per household or up to 18,000 gallons per year per household.
