= Finley Resources =

American privately owned energy company

Finley Resources is a privately owned and operated energy company headquartered in Fort Worth, Texas, USA. The company operates about 2,500 oil and gas properties in nine states including Texas, Oklahoma, Utah, Wyoming, Louisiana, Mississippi, Alabama, Pennsylvania, and New Mexico.

Affiliated companies include Mesa Well Servicing in Hobbs, New Mexico, Slick Rod Systems, Pecos Transport, and ATD, Inc.

== History ==
Finley resources was established in 1993. In 2012, the owner and CEO of Findlay Resources was Jim Finley, who was previously a Texas Certified Public Accountant working primarily with oil and gas companies. By 2014, the company had about 90 employees.

Finley Resources has been active in the development of the Barnett Shale and the Texas Permian Baisin, among other energy developments. Some of the company's operations use the hydraulic fracturing process. The company uses water, mainly from ponds and rivers, for this process. One of its wells is within the town of Norman, Oklahoma and this led to a dispute over the use of the town's drinking water for industrial purposes. The company was able to do this legally even during a period of water shortage because the town ordinances did not limit industrial use in these circumstances.

In 2014 Finley resources was in the news several times, once after Finley made a $40,000 campaign contribution to a member of the state panel that regulates oil and natural gas. Later, an explosion of two oil storage tanks injured one worker. One of the company's injection wells, near Azle, Texas was shut down over concerns that high pressure in the well might have been the cause of a number of local earth tremors. However, the Texas Railroad Commission which did the testing indicated that the closure was precautionary and that there was no evidence that the tremors were caused by the well.
