= Valley High School (West Des Moines, Iowa) =

Public secondary school in West Des Moines, Iowa, United States

Location
- 3650 Woodland Avenue; West Des Moines, Iowa 50266; 41.5880°N 93.7540°W

Information
- Type: Public high school
- Established: 1895
- School district: West Des Moines Community Schools
- Superintendent: Matt Adams
- NCES School ID: 1930930
- Principal: Shane Christensen
- Teaching staff: 123.33 (on an FTE basis)
- Enrollment: 2,178 (2024-25)
- Student to teacher ratio: 17.12
- Colors: Orange and black
- Athletics conference: Central Iowa Metro League
- Nickname: Tigers
- Rivals: Dowling Catholic
- Website: valley.wdmcs.org

Valley High School (VHS) is a public high school located in West Des Moines, Iowa. VHS is a three-year comprehensive high school with approximately 2,000 students. The school hosts grades 10–12. It is run by the West Des Moines Community Schools. Freshmen attend a separate school, Valley Southwoods.

== Demographics ==
As of the 2021–22 school year, there were 572 students (27.9% of enrollment) eligible for free lunch and 97 (4.7% of students) eligible for reduced-cost lunch.

== History ==
In October 1895, the first established high school in Valley Junction at 415 Seventh Street was opened. Valley Junction's first graduation was held on May 31, 1901, with just nine graduates. By 1916, the student body population had grown and a local bond was passed for a new high school. Construction on $50,000 structure at Eighth and Hillside was completed in 1917.

In 1938, when Valley Junction changed its name, the school district changed, becoming the West Des Moines Independent School District. At this time, one high school, a junior high school and three elementary schools served the needs of the community. In the same year a grant from the Public Works Administration allowed for a new concrete stadium to be built just north of the high school on Eighth Street.

In 1962, 38 acres (150,000 m^{2}) of farmland near 35th and Ashworth Road were purchased by the School Board for $116,000 as a site for a new high school. Construction of Valley High School was completed in four phases from 1963 to 1970. Valley became a four-year high school during the 1971–72 school year. Costing nearly $5.5 million, Valley High School stretched almost one-quarter of a mile from end to end. Also in 1971, Valley opened the Metropolitan Conference's newest and largest gymnasium. Additional classrooms, science labs, and other student spaces have been added over the years. The first year that the new school was open, it was used for classrooms for some sixth grade students and for the ninth grade year of the class of 1970. The next year, it became a three-year high school. The graduating class of 1975 was the first class to attend four years in the new building.

In 1995, the school district had 546 students as an average enrollment in grades 9–12, making Valley the largest high school in the state.

In the fall of 1997, the construction of the Freshman High School Building, Valley Southwoods, was completed, and Valley High School became a tenth through 12th grade building. Throughout the early 2010s, construction continued on Valley, including the Staplin Performing Arts Center, the school's auditorium.

== Academics ==
Valley offers almost 190 academic courses, including 23 Advanced Placement (AP) courses. Valley also has recently started an Honors Program, which is meant to be comparable to the IB (International Baccalaureate) Program.

== Athletics ==
Football

The Valley High School football team won the Iowa State 4A Championships in 2002, 2003, 2005, 2008, and 2011.

Boys' cross country

The Valley High School boys' cross country team won the 1A State title in 1955.

The Valley High School boys' cross country team won the 2A State title in 1962.

Boys' basketball

The Valley High School boys' basketball team won the 4A state title in 1993, 2016, 2023, 2024 and 2025.

Girls' basketball

The Valley High School girls' basketball team won the 5A state title in 2017 and 2019.

Wrestling

The Valley High School wrestling team won the 3A dual tournament state title in 2016.

Boys' swimming

The Valley High School boys' swim team won the 4A State title in 1984, 2010 and 2024

Girls' swimming

The Valley High School girls' swimming and diving team won the state title in 1974, 1975, in addition to winning it four years in a row (2005, 2006, 2007, and 2008).

Girls' soccer

The Valley High School girls' soccer team won the 4A State title in 2003, 2005, 2006, 2007, 2008 and 2010.

Boys' soccer

The Valley High School boys' soccer club won the state title 1996, 1997, 2001, 2006, 2016, and 2025.

Boys' track and field

The Valley High School boys' track and field won the state title in Outdoor Track and Field in 1942, 1955, 1998, 2003, 2006, 2017, 2018 and 2019.

The Valley High School boys' track and field won the state title in Indoor Track and Field in 1951 and 1952.

The Valley High School boys' track and field won the state title in the Pentathlon in 1996, 1997, 1998, 1999, 2000, 2001, 2002, and 2016.

Girls' track and field

The Valley High School girls' track and field won the 4A State Track and Field Meet in 1998, 2003 and 2006.

Boys' tennis

The Valley High School boys' tennis team won the state title in 1985, 1986, 1993 and 2010.

Girls' tennis

The Valley High School girls' tennis team won the state title in 1993, 2A in 1994 and 2001.

Girls' golf

The Valley High School girls' golf team won the state title in 1968, 1970, 1976, 1977, 1978, 1979, 3A in 1982, 1983, and 4A in 2006.

Boys' golf

The Valley High School boys' golf team won the state title in 1976, 1989, 2008, 2012, 2017, and 2024.

Baseball

The Valley High School baseball team won the state title in 1955, 1995, 2003, 2004, 2005 and 2006.

Softball

The Valley High School girls' softball team won state titles in 1990, 2003, 2005, 2007, 2010 and 2019.

Synchronized swimming (no longer sanctioned by IGHSAU)

The Valley High School Girls' synchronized swim team won the state title in 1979, 1980 and 1981. It is now held as a club sport during the winter and spring.

== Music & arts ==
The Valley Music Department was honored with the first GRAMMY Signature School award in 1999.

The 240-member Valley Marchmasters were selected to perform in the 2004 Tournament of Roses Parade. In March 2007, the band traveled to Dublin, Ireland to march in the Saint Patrick's Day Parade.

Valley's orchestra has completed concert tours in Austria and Italy. In June 2007, the orchestra traveled to New York City, New York to play at Carnegie Hall as part of NYBOF'07.

The choral show, jazz, and core ensembles have performed in several national and international venues such as Carnegie Hall and Disney World, and received top honors at competitions throughout the country.

The school also has a high school radio station, KWDM, which broadcasts from 6am to 6pm, Monday through Friday. It is one of two high school radio programs in Iowa, and the only high school program in the state to have a fully digital production and on-air studio.

Mimes Performing at Valley's 2005 Winter Assembly

== Activities ==
Valley High School won the 2006 National High School Mock Trial Championship, held in Oklahoma City, Oklahoma and more recently won the state competition in 2011. Valley has a large selection of clubs for students to participate in.

The Valley High School debate team has won the Lincoln-Douglas division of the Tournament of Champions (debate), the debate national championship, more times than any other high school in the United States. In the 2015–16 debate season, they were in the top five programs in the country by number of Tournament of Champions bids and hosted a tournament with an octafinals bid to the Tournament of Champions in Lincoln-Douglas, the highest level, one of only eight high schools in the country to do so.

== Notable alumni ==
- Cindy Axne (born 1965), U.S. Representative
- Jake Campos (born 1994), XFL player
- Jared Clauss (born 1981), retired professional football player, who played for the Tennessee Titans after being drafted in the seventh round from the University of Iowa
- Dominique Dafney (born 1997), professional football player for the Green Bay Packers
- Katelyn Epperly (born 1990), American Idol Season 9
- Rodney Faraon (born 1970), former CIA officer and film/television producer
- Brian Fletcher, lawyer
- Justin Hartwig (born 1978), Super Bowl XLIII Champion center for the Pittsburgh Steelers
- Peter Hedges (born 1962), film director and screenwriter
- Ashley Hinson (born 1983) US Congresswoman- Iowa 1st District
- Dana Jacobson (born 1971), sportscaster and co-host of CBS Saturday Morning
- Dan Jennings (born 1987), retired pitcher for the Chicago White Sox
- Shawn Johnson (born 1992), retired artistic gymnast, Olympic gold and silver medalist, Dancing with the Stars Season Eight winner and Dancing with the Stars Season Fifteen runner-up
- Peter Jok (born 1994), professional basketball player
- Karlos Kirby (born 1968), Olympic bobsledder
- Rocky Lombardi (born 1998) former football player for Michigan State University and Northern Illinois University
- Carl Pohlad (1915–2009), businessman and owner of the Minnesota Twins
- Eli Raridon (born 2004), college football tight end for the Notre Dame Fighting Irish
- Major General Roger W. Sandler, US Army Retired (born 1934), Chief, United States Army Reserve, 1991–1994.
- Tanner Stine, actor
- Joe Woodley, college football coach

== See also ==
- List of high schools in Iowa
