= Sammons Enterprises =

Multinational company

Sammons Enterprises, Inc. is a diverse holding company composed of financial services, industrial equipment, real estate investment, and infrastructure businesses operating in six countries. Headquartered in Dallas, Texas (US), Sammons was established by Charles Sammons in 1938.

Industrial equipment services provider Briggs Equipment was founded in Dallas in 1896 as Briggs-Weaver Machinery Company by J.C. Weaver and C.H. Briggs. Charles Sammons purchased Briggs Equipment in 1952, and it continues as a separate division of Sammons International.

With more than $5 billion in annual revenues and $70 billion in assets, Sammons is one of the largest privately held companies in the US.

== Interests ==
Sammons companies include wholly owned subsidiaries as well as partial investments. Sammons wholly owned subsidiaries include Briggs International, Sammons Financial Group, Sammons Equity Alliance, Sammons Power Development and Sweetwater River Ranches.

=== Briggs International ===
SEI’s industrial equipment business, Briggs® International, is composed of Briggs Equipment operations in the US, Mexico and the United Kingdom. Each Briggs business represents various manufacturers providing rental, sales, parts and service for materials handling equipment customers.

==== Briggs Equipment US ====
With 28 locations in eight states, Briggs Equipment US sells, rents, provides service and parts, and fleet management for materials handling and other industrial equipment. Briggs US is one of the largest Yale and Hyster dealers in the country. The company’s customers include automotive, beverage, manufacturing, oil and gas, ports, steel, glass, technology, and warehousing industries.

==== Briggs Equipment Mexico ====
One of the largest materials handling distributors in Mexico, Briggs Equipment Mexico sells and provides long-term rental and service contracts for materials-handling equipment customers across Mexico. It is a leading provider of forklifts for the automotive industry, but also works with bottling, construction, logistics, food and beverage, pharmaceutical and steel companies in Mexico.

==== Briggs Equipment UK ====
Briggs UK is an engineering and equipment provider. The exclusive national distributor for Yale and Hyster forklifts in the UK, Briggs also provides global equipment and maintenance support through its partnership with the Ministry of Defence. Briggs Equipment UK acquired North Wales forklift business Gwynedd Forklifts in March 2021 & Northern Ireland hire business Balloo Hire Centres in April 2019, & JB Plant & Tool Hire in 2021. They also acquired Forkway in December 2021 & GPT 2022 along with Laois Hire. Also Aerial Platform Hire.

=== Sammons Equity Alliance ===
Sammons Equity Alliance encompasses Sammons investments in real estate, private equity investments, and energy sectors.

==== Sammons Financial Group ====
Sammons Financial Group (SFG), the financial services arm of SEI, is made up of four businesses offering retirement products, annuities and life insurance including bank, corporate and credit union-owned life insurance. In January 2021, SFG expanded it offering in the registered investment advisory (RIA) space through the acquisition of Beacon Capital Management

The corporate headquarters is in West Des Moines, Iowa.

==== Compatriot Capital ====
Compatriot Capital is a real estate investment company. The business provides capital to support growth and expansion of private development companies. Currently, Compatriot maintains entity-level investments in five companies developing projects in the commercial office,

==== Sammons Power Development ====
Sammons Power Development has an interest in several energy projects. The company currently owns land in Arizona permitted for the development of a gas-fired generation plant and has an interest in Pathfinder

=== Sweetwater River Ranches ===
Sweetwater Ranches Conservancy, LLC is the holding company for several habitat and species conservation banks in central Wyoming. The Conservancy enhances and protects prairie and watershed habitats and threatened and endangered species. Located on more than 600,000 acres of private, state and federal land, the Conservancy offers habitat and species credits to private-companies doing business in Wyoming.
