= Iowa Foundation for Medical Care =

American nonprofit organization

Iowa Foundation for Medical Care (IFMC) is an American nonprofit organization which provides services in health care quality improvement and medical information management. Taxpayer-funded, IFMC is based in West Des Moines, Iowa and has offices in Illinois, Maryland and Oklahoma. Annual revenues are approximately US$100 million with nearly 800 employees. The company holds the Medicare Quality Improvement Organizations (QIO) contracts for Iowa and Illinois. As of 2007, IFMC was by far the largest of the 53 taxpayer-funded QIOs in the United States.

== IFMC business units ==
- ENCOMPASS Health Management Systems
- IFMC Health Care Quality Programs
- IFMC - IL
- IFMC Information Systems
