= BestMaid =

Company specializing in pickled products

- Founded: 1926
- Founder: Jesse Otis; Mildred Dalton
- Headquarters: Fort Worth, Texas, United States
- Products: Pickled cucumbers
- Owner: Gary Dalton
- Number of employees: 350
- Website: bestmaidpickles.com

BestMaid is an American brand of pickles that is owned by the Dalton Family. Since its introduction in 1926, it has become one of the most popular pickle brands in Texas.

== History ==
The company was founded by Jesse Otis and Mildred Dalton in 1926. The company is still owned and operated by the Dalton family in Fort Worth.

On October 23, 2020, the company opened a gift shop, named the Pickle Emporium.

Due to the company's operations in nearby Mansfield, Texas, the city is known as the 'Pickle Capital of Texas' and holds an annual Pickle Parade on St. Patrick's Day.
