= Hilltop Holdings Inc. =

Financial Services Holding Company

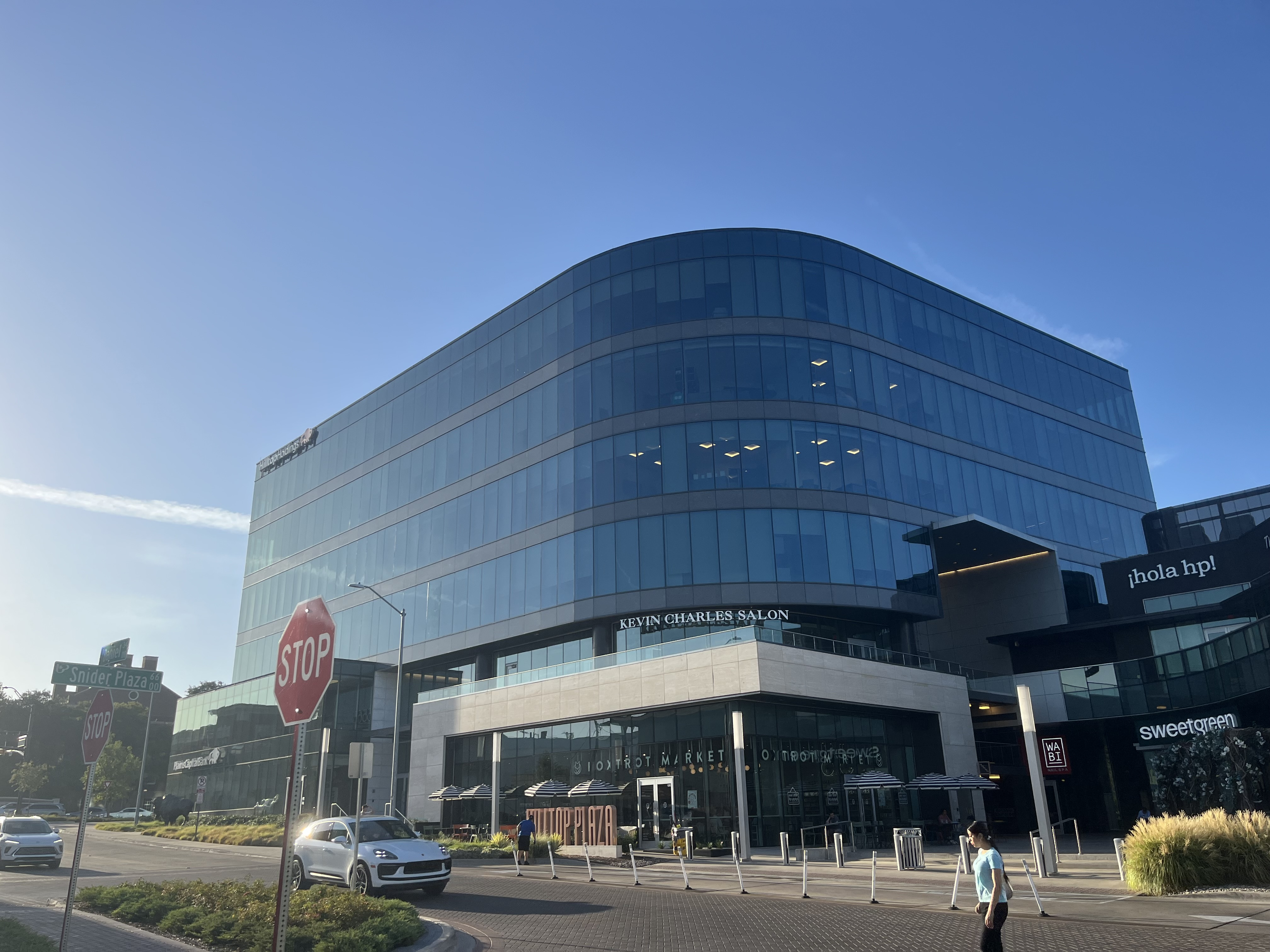
- The headquarters of Hilltop Holdings in University Park, TX
- Type: Public
- Traded as: NYSE: HTH; S&P 600 component
- Industry: Financial services
- Founded: 1998
- Headquarters: 6565 Hillcrest Ave; Dallas, Texas, U.S.
- Key people: Jeremy Ford (Chairman, President, and CEO), William Furr (Chief Financial Officer), Darren Parmenter (Chief Administrative Officer)
- Number of employees: 3,650(2024)
- Website: hilltop.com

Hilltop Holdings Inc. is a financial holding company based in Dallas, Texas. It offers financial products and banking services through three primary subsidiaries: PlainsCapital Bank, PrimeLending, and HilltopSecurities.

== Corporate overview ==
Hilltop Holdings is a financial holding company that provides business and consumer banking services from locations throughout Texas via its primary subsidiary, PlainsCapital Bank. A wholly owned subsidiary of PlainsCapital Bank, PrimeLending, provides mortgage lending services with offices throughout the United States. Hilltop Securities Inc. and Momentum Independent Network Inc. are subsidiaries of Hilltop Holdings that provide brokerage and investment banking services to clients throughout the United States.

Jeremy Ford was named as the sole CEO of Hilltop Holdings in April 2019. William Furr was appointed as chief financial officer in September 2016.

As of its December 31, 2024 earnings report, Hilltop Holdings reported employment of about 3,650 people and operating 280 locations in 48 U.S. states, with total assets of US$16.3 billion.

== History and acquisitions ==
Hilltop Holdings was established as Affordable Residential Communities in 1998. The real estate investment trust focused on acquiring, renovating and operating manufactured home communities, among other services. The company completed an initial public offering in July 2004. In 2007, Affordable Residential Communities sold its manufactured home communities business assets for US$1.8 billion and changed its name to Hilltop Holdings Inc. Also in 2007, Hilltop Holdings purchased National Lloyds Corporation, an insurance company specializing in coverage for manufactured homes.

On November 30, 2012, Hilltop Holdings acquired PlainsCapital Corporation and its operating subsidiaries PlainsCapital Bank, PrimeLending and First Southwest Company. It acquired the former First National Bank of Edinburg, Texas, in 2013.

In January 2015, Hilltop Holdings finalized acquisition of SWS Group Inc. for approximately US$350 million. The SWS subsidiary Southwest Securities Federal Savings Bank (FSB) was merged into PlainsCapital Bank. In January 2016, Hilltop Holdings subsidiaries First Southwest Company and the previous SWS banking subsidiary Southwest Securities Inc. merged and began operations as HilltopSecurities.

In August 2018, Hilltop completed its acquisition of Houston-based The Bank of River Oaks in an $85 million all-cash transaction.

In June 2020, Hilltop Holdings completed the sale of National Lloyds Corporation and its subsidiaries to Align Financial Holdings, LLC. for $150 million

== Recent rankings ==
- 2024: Hilltop Holdings, PlainsCapital Bank, HilltopSecurities, and PrimeLending were included in USA Today’s list of Top Workplaces for 2024.
- 2023: No. 33 on S&P Global Market Intelligence’s list of Top 50 Public Banks in 2023
- 2016: Second on Bank Director's list of best-performing medium-sized banks (between US$5 billion and US$50 billion in assets)
- 2016: No. 31 on the Fortune 100 list of 100 Fastest-Growing Companies based on revenue and earnings per share growth and annualized returns over the past three years
- 2015 and 2016: No. 52 in Dallas Business Journal list of the top 100 public companies in North Texas for 2015; ranked No. 42 in 2016
- 2015 and 2016: No. 18 and No. 5 in 2015 and 2016, respectively, in the Forbes list Top 100 largest publicly traded banks and thrifts
- 2014: No. 3 in Bank Director magazine's Bank Performance Scorecard in US$5 billion to US$50 billion asset category
- 2013: No. 57 in Best's Review's Top 75 North American Public Insurers based on 2012 assets

== Subsidiary: PlainsCapital Bank ==
PlainsCapital Bank
- Founded: 1998 in Lubbock, Texas, Texas, US
- Headquarters: Dallas, Texas, US
- Key people: Jeremy Ford (Chairman and CEO), Brian Heflin (President), Pete Villarreal (Chief Operating Officer)
- Services: Consumer banking
- Website: www.plainscapital.com Predecessors: Plains National Bank, Southwest Securities FSB Deposits: US$ 11.1 billion (2024) Parent: Hilltop Holdings Inc.

PlainsCapital Bank conducts commercial and consumer banking in the state of Texas, with 55 branch locations as of 2025. The bank is a member of the Federal Deposit Insurance Corporation (FDIC) and states it is an Equal Housing Lender. The bank offers:

- Commercial lending and other commercial banking services
- Treasury management
- Small business banking
- Private banking
- Trust and wealth management services
- Consumer banking

As of 2024, the bank ranks as the 6th largest bank based in Texas, based on deposit market share with total deposits of US$11.1 billion reported.

== History and acquisitions: PlainsCapital Bank ==
The bank was founded as Plains National Bank by Alan B. White, its former chairman, in 1988 in Lubbock, Texas USA. In 1999, it expanded with a branch in Dallas, and acquired Dallas-based residential mortgage lender PrimeLending. The bank added branches in other major Texas markets through the 2000s. In 2003 the bank changed its name to PlainsCapital Bank.

In 2009, PlainsCapital acquired First Southwest Company, a Dallas-based public finance advisory firm and investment bank.

In 2012 the bank was acquired by Hilltop Holdings. In 2013 Hilltop Holdings acquired PlainsCapital acquired First National Bank of Edinburg, Texas, and merged its operations into PlainsCapital Bank. As part of the Hilltop Holdings acquisition of SWS Group, Southwest Securities Inc. was merged into PlainsCapital Bank in 2015. As part of that process, First Southwest Co. was moved out from under PlainsCapital Bank, to become a direct subsidiary of Hilltop Holdings. In early 2016, First Southwest Co. was officially merged with Southwest Securities Inc. to become HilltopSecurities. Today PlainsCapital Bank operates as a subsidiary of Hilltop Holdings, with PrimeLending as its main subsidiary.

== Subsidiary: PrimeLending ==
PrimeLending
- Founded: 1986
- Headquarters: Dallas, Texas, US
- Key people: Steve Thompson (President & CEO)
- Services: Home loans, mortgage refinancing
- Website: www.primelending.com Loans: US$ 23 billion (2020) Parent: Hilltop Holdings Inc.

As a direct subsidiary of PlainsCapital Bank, PrimeLending is a national residential mortgage originator providing home loans, home renovation loans and mortgage refinancing.

PrimeLending has ranked as a Top 10 purchase lender yearly since 2012, based on purchase units. It reported originating US$23 billion in loans in 2020. Steve Thompson is the president and CEO.

As of December 2021, PrimeLending reported approximately 300 locations in the United States, with approximately 1,250 loan officers. PrimeLending is licensed to originate and close loans in all 50 states and in the District of Columbia. PrimeLending sells many of the loans it originates into secondary markets. It offers:

- Conventional
- Fixed- and adjustable-rate loans
- VA home loans
- FHA home loans
- Jumbo home loans
- USDA home loans
- Home renovation loans
- Relocation services

== History and acquisitions: PrimeLending ==
The corporation was founded in 1986 and started initial operations with a staff of 20. Its first year, it reported generating US$80 million in home loans. PrimeLending was acquired by PlainsCapital Corporation in 1999. On November 30, 2012, Hilltop Holdings acquired PlainsCapital Corporation and its operating subsidiaries, including PrimeLending. Today PrimeLending operates as a subsidiary of PlainsCapital Bank.

== Subsidiary: HilltopSecurities ==
HilltopSecurities
- Industry: Financial services
- Founded: January 2016
- Headquarters: Dallas, Texas, US
- Key people: M. Bradley Winges (President and CEO), Hill A. Feinberg (Chairman Emeritus)
- Website: www.hilltopsecurities.com Predecessors: Southwest Securities, Inc. FirstSouthwest Co LLC Parent: Hilltop Holdings Inc.

HilltopSecurities is a financial services company headquartered in Dallas. The company is a broker-dealer and Registered Investment Adviser that provides investment banking and financial advisory services. It was founded in January 2016 from the merger of two Dallas-based financial firms, FirstSouthwest Company and Southwest Securities, Inc.

HilltopSecurities is led by M. Bradley Winges, president and CEO. Jon Sobel serves as chairman. Former CEO, Hill A. Feinberg, serves as chairman emeritus. As of December 2024, HilltopSecurities had approximately 790 employees in approximately 40 offices in the United States.

HilltopSecurities provides financial services for public and private organizations, investors and issuers through six main lines of business:

- Capital markets
- Public finance
- Retail brokerage
- Structured finance
- Securities lending services
- Securities clearing services

The company is a founding member of the American Securities Association, an industry association established in February 2016 to represent the interests of mid-sized and regional investment banks and securities dealers.

== History and acquisitions: HilltopSecurities ==
FirstSouthwest Co. was founded in 1946, and in 1991 was acquired by a Dallas group including individual investors Hill A. Feinberg, Tom Luce and Bob Utley. By 2003 the firm was operating in eight states. PlainsCapital Bank acquired FirstSouthwest at the end of 2008. Following the acquisition, FirstSouthwest continued to operate independently under its original name.

Southwest Securities, Inc. was founded in April 1972 as MidSouthwest Securities, Inc. and removed the "Mid" to become Southwest Securities, Inc. in 1979. Its parent company, SWS Group, Inc., announced in 2014 that it was being acquired by Hilltop Holdings Inc. in a stock and cash deal. The acquisition of SWS Group and its subsidiaries, including Southwest Securities, Inc. was completed on January 1, 2015. With the acquisition, Hilltop Holdings began a process to merge Southwest Securities and FirstSouthwest. On January 25, 2016, HilltopSecurities announced its official launch as a new entity, following regulatory approval for the merger under Hilltop Holdings ownership. Today, HilltopSecurities operates as a subsidiary of Hilltop Holdings.
