= Mohr Partners =

Mohr Partners, Inc.
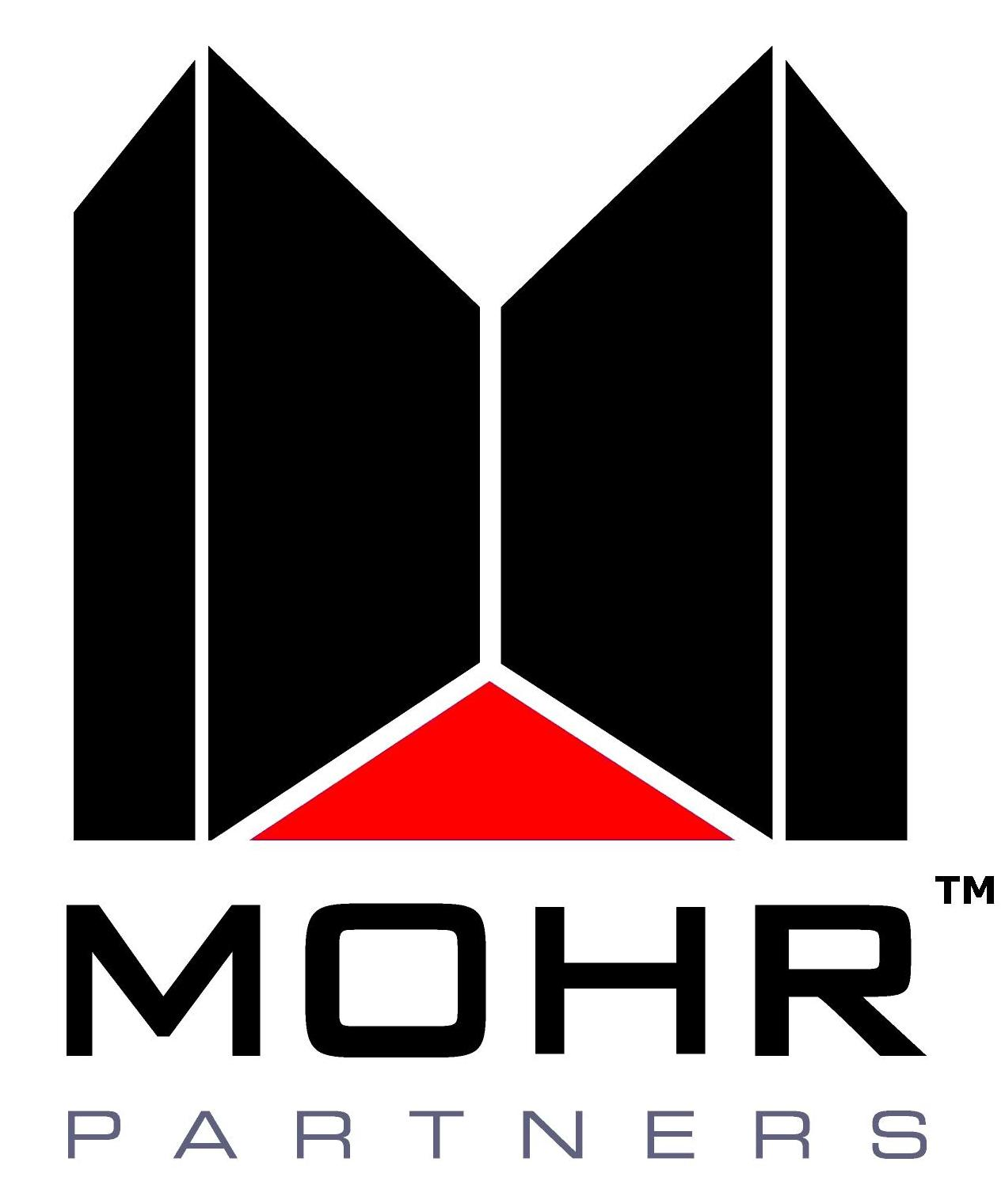
- Company type: Private
- Industry: Real estate
- Founded: 1986
- Headquarters: Dallas, Texas, United States
- Key people: Robert Shibuya, chairman & CEO; Sohail Hamirani, CFO; Eric Beichler, managing principal Rob Pipkin, managing principal Stephen Hemphill, managing principal
- Products: Commercial real estate services
- Number of employees: Over 200
- Website: mohrpartners.com

Mohr Partners, Inc. is an American global corporate real estate advisory firm based in Dallas, Texas.

== History ==
Bob Mohr founded Mohr Partners in 1986, just two years after moving his family to Dallas from Indiana. Starting with an office in Dallas, Mohr Partners eventually grew to over 25 offices by 2020. In 2014, Robert Shibuya joined Mohr Partners as the company's president, and helped expand the firm to offices in multiple locations including Nashville, Phoenix, St. Louis, and Austin.

In 2017, Shibuya completed a management buyout of Mohr Partners, assuming the role of chairman and CEO. Mohr was named chairman emeritus. Currently, Mohr Partners maintains 23 offices in the United States and four international offices.

The firm is recognized as a National Corporate Plus Member by the National Minority Supplier Development Council (NMSDC). Mohr Partners is the only commercial real estate firm in the program.

== Services ==
Mohr Partners uses:

- Strategic consulting and advice
- Mohr Intel (business intelligence)
- Global lease services
- Research and site selection
- Incentives practice
- Transaction management
- Project and development services
- Capital markets
