= Crossmark =

American marketing company

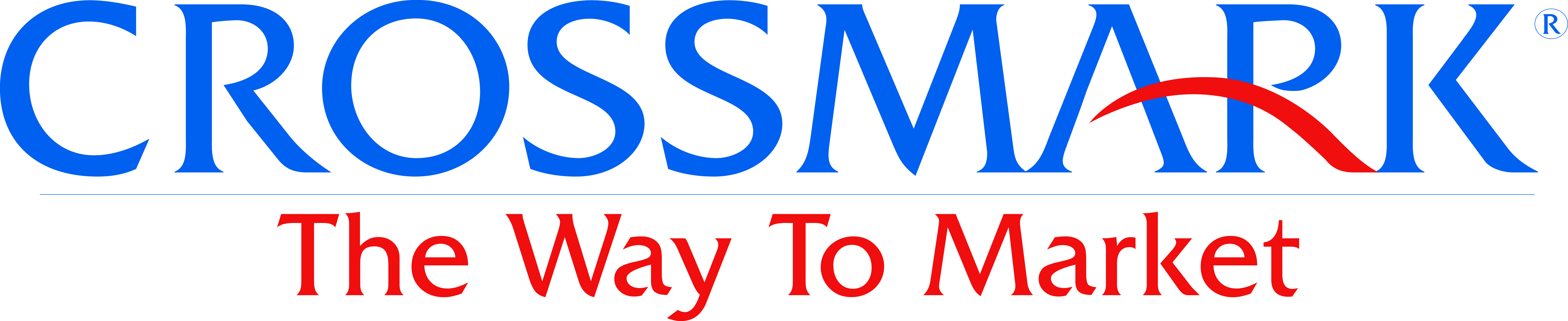
- Industry: Consumer goods
- Founded: 1905; 121 years ago, in Fort Smith, Arkansas
- Founder: Willis Johnson; E. Leslie Hunt
- Headquarters: Lewisville, Texas
- Area served: North America
- Key people: Jami McDermid – President
- Services: Sales and marketing
- Owner: Acosta Group; (2024–present)
- Website: www.crossmark.com

Crossmark, Inc. is a sales and marketing services company that operates within the consumer goods industry. The company was established in 1905 by Willis Johnson and E. Leslie Hunt in Fort Smith, Arkansas as a provision supply point for groups traveling to the Oklahoma Territory. Crossmark contributes research and data to the Food Marketing Institute. The company serves grocery, mass, club, drug, convenience store, and home improvement channels.

Acquired in 2024, Crossmark is a subsidiary of Acosta Group, a parent brand that unifies several agencies under a single enterprise structure.

== History ==
The company was founded in 1905 as Johnson and Hunt Merchandise Brokers in Fort Smith, Arkansas. The company began as a provision supply point for groups traveling to the Oklahoma Territory and evolved into a national sales and marketing agency over the next century.

In 1914, the company was renamed as Willis Johnson & Company and operations moved to Little Rock, Arkansas.

In 1943, President Roosevelt named Willis Johnson Sr. to the National Office of Price and Administration, a two-year assignment.

In 1944, the W.L. Gordon Company formed in Dallas, Texas. In 1953 the Phillips Brokerage Company was created in Birmingham, Alabama.

In 1977, Johnson and Hunt Merchandise Brokers rebranded to SALES MARK and began travelling across the country to rotate products on shelves.

In 2017, Walmart selected Crossmark as one of five Preferred Services Providers (PSP) to be part of its “Merchandising Services Program”. Only preferred service providers are authorized and approved to perform merchandising services in Walmart’s stores on behalf of the retailer or its suppliers.

== Sales and acquisitions ==
In 1997, Crossmark was one of three companies that collectively controlled 75 percent of the sales and marketing services industry. In 2012, The Dallas Morning News reported that then Plano, Texas-based Crossmark had 34,000 employees and an estimated annual revenue of $1 billion. In December 2012, a majority of the company was sold to the private equity firm Warburg Pincus.

On August 6, 2013, Crossmark agreed to buy Marketing Werks. The Marketing Werks deal will contribute to its total annual revenue of nearly $1 billion. Based in Chicago, Marketing Werks provides experiential marketing campaigns for companies in several consumer industries.

In October 2013, Mike Graen joined CROSSMARK as Vice President/Managing Director for CROSSMARK's Center for Collaboration in Bentonville, Arkansas, which opened in July 2014.

In November 2013, Crossmark acquired Chicago-based agencies Marketing Werks and PromoWorks to strengthen its shopper marketing and activation capabilities.

In 2018, WIS International acquired Crossmark and Lawrence Merchandising Services. Lawrence Merchandising Services (LMS) was renamed Crossmark Retail Solutions.

In 2022, WIS International announced Marketing Werks, PromoWorks, and Crossmark Events would merge under one new agency name: Product Connections.

In May 2024, Acosta Group agreed to acquire Crossmark from WIS International. The transaction was finalized two months later. In July 2024, Crossmark joined Acosta Group’s collective of agencies focused on delivering integrated omnichannel solutions. The acquisition also included Product Connections, which continues to operate as a distinct brand within the group.

== Services ==
CROSSMARK provides a range of services designed to support brand growth and retail performance:

- Headquarter sales services, such as working with retailer buyers to win listings, manage budget promotion, etc.
- Retail solutions including in-store merchandising, compliance, display programs, field service, and retail operations support
- Marketing solutions, such as shopper marketing, promotions, activations, and motorized or experiential engagements
- Insights and analytics, including data modeling, reporting, and technology platforms to help brands understand the retail environment, shopper behavior, and performance metrics.

These services are tailored to meet the needs of consumer packaged goods (CPG) companies and retailers across multiple channels.

== Recognition ==
In 2010 and 2011, InformationWeek ranked Crossmark on its list of most-innovative users of business technology.
