= Walnut Township, Polk County, Iowa =

Township in Polk County, Iowa, U.S.

Coordinates: 41.584°N 93.753°W

Walnut Township is a township in Polk County, Iowa, United States.

== History ==
Walnut Township was established in 1860.
