= Laguna Mall =

Shopping mall in Hong Kong

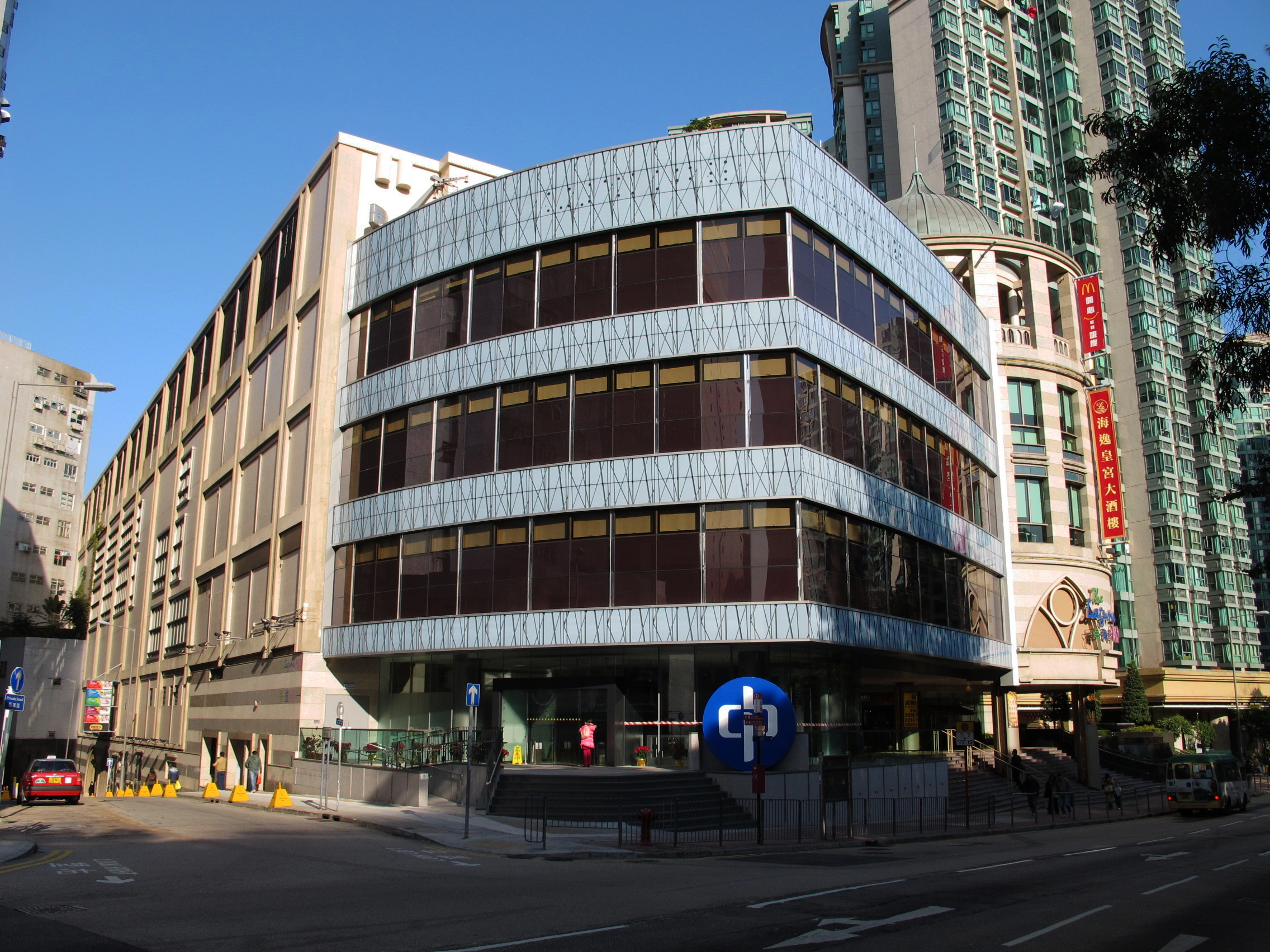
- Photo of the Laguna Mall in 2012
- Location: Tai Wan, Hung Hom, Kowloon, Hong Kong
- Coordinates: 22.3093°N 114.1915°E
- Address: 8 Laguna Verde Avenue, Hung Hom, Kowloon, Hong Kong
- Opened: 2000; 26 years ago
- Previous names: Fisherman's Wharf
- Owner: Cheung Kong Holdings (2000–2016); CLP Group (2016–present)
- Architect: Hsin Yieh Architects & Associates Ltd.
- Floor area: 300,000 ft²
- Floors: 5
- Parking: 200 spaces

Laguna Mall
- Chinese: 海逸坊
Transcriptions
Standard Mandarin
- Hanyu Pinyin: Hǎi Yì Fāng
Yue: Cantonese
- Jyutping: hoi2 jat6 fong1

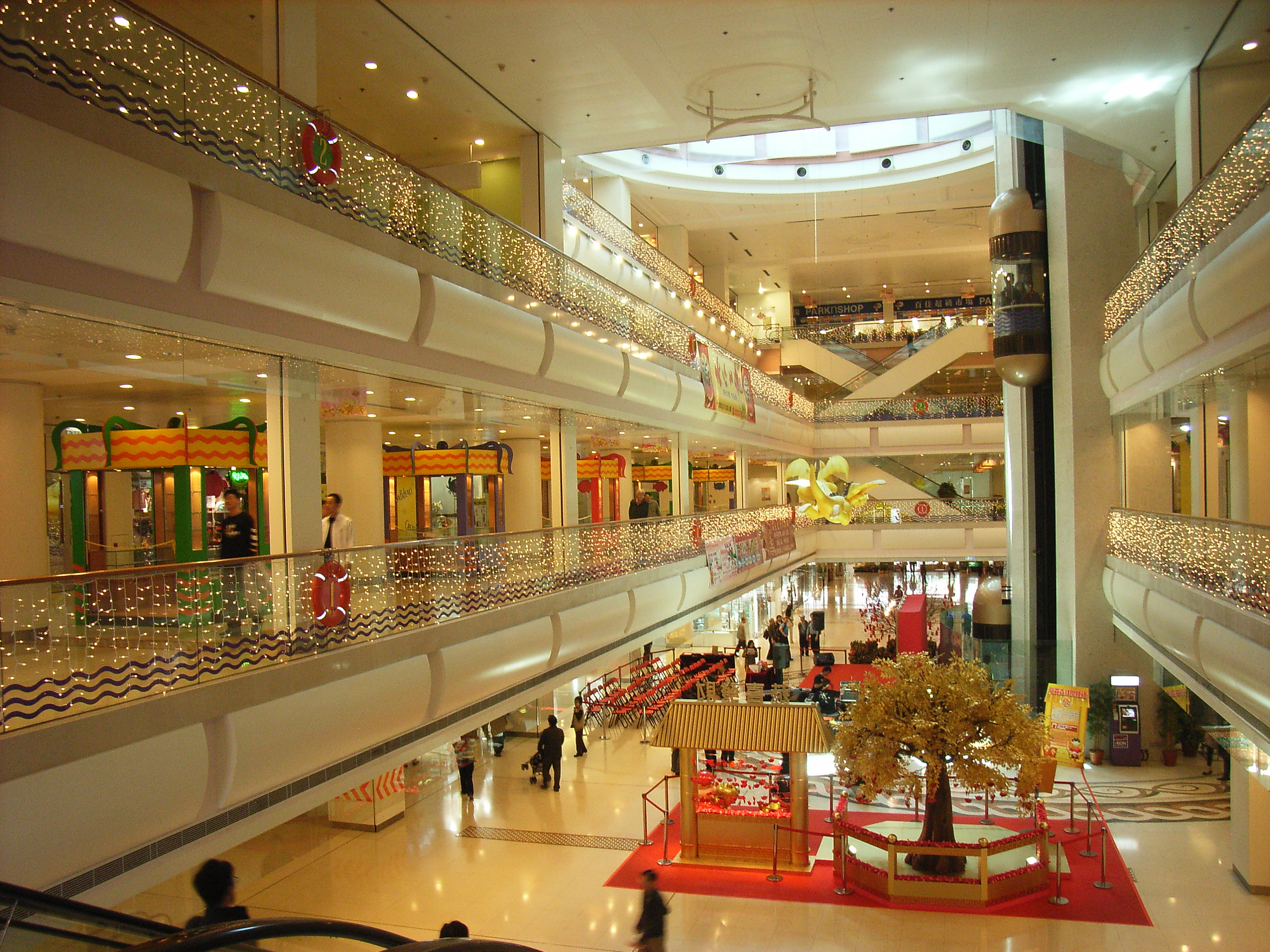
Interior of Fisherman's Wharf (2007)

The Laguna Mall (海逸坊; hoi2 jat6 fong1), formerly Fisherman's Wharf (漁人碼頭), is a shopping centre in Hong Kong, located at 8 Laguna Verde Road, Hung Hom, within the residential complex of Laguna Verde (海逸豪園). There are five floors. Floor LG to Floor UG are occupied by shops, Floor 2 is the headquarters of CLP power, while Floor 3 is shared by the Laguna Verde clubhouse and CLP.

== See also ==
- Fisherman's Wharfs in other places
