= Dan Gehlbach =

American politician (born 1977)

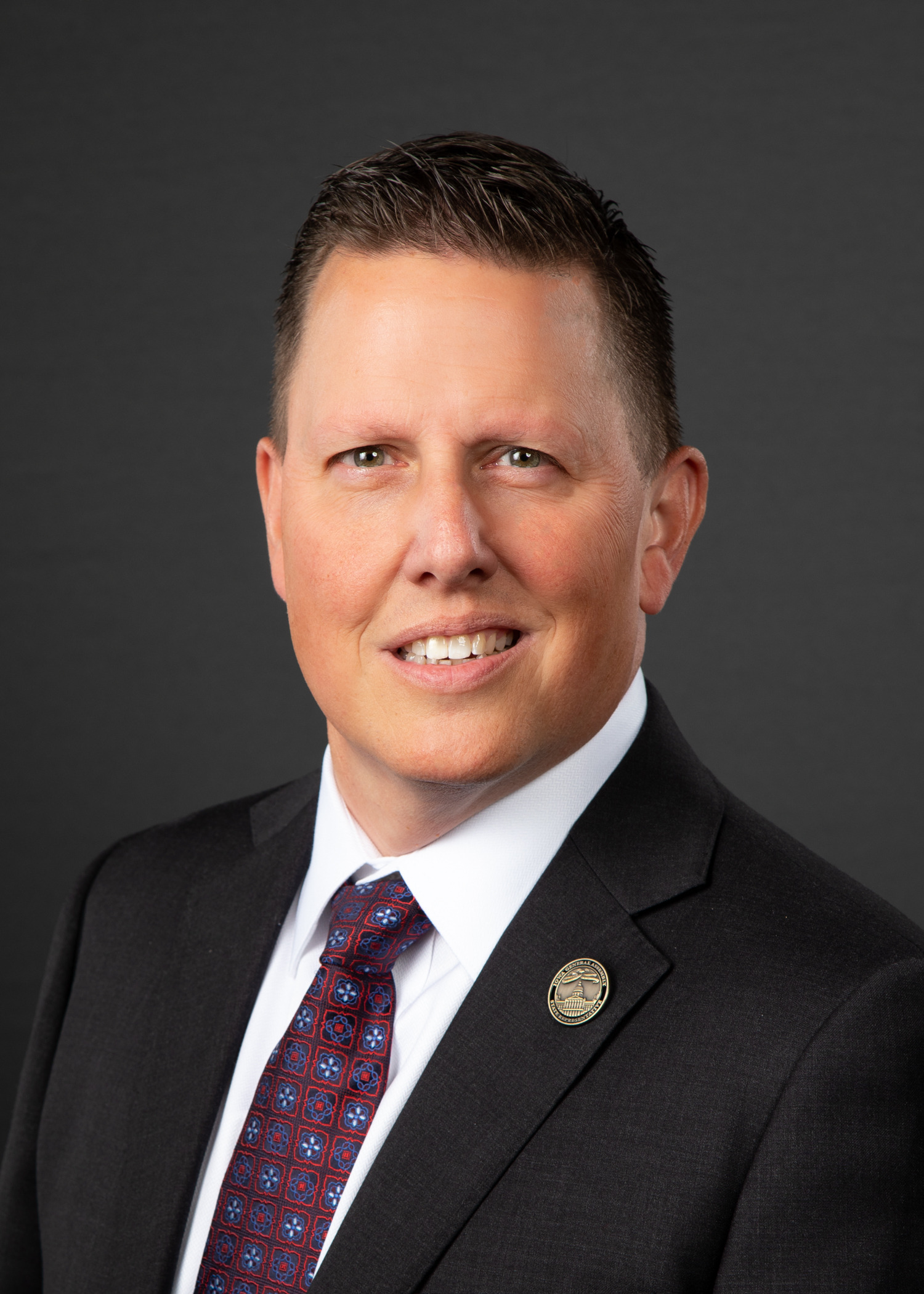
- Official portrait, 2023

Member of the Iowa House of Representatives from the 46th district
- Incumbent
- Assumed office January 9, 2023
- Preceded by: Ross Wilburn (redistricting)

Personal details
- Born: 1977 (age 48–49) Des Moines, Iowa, U.S.
- Party: Republican
- Spouse: Staci
- Children: 2
- Education: University of Kansas (BS); Arizona State University (MBA)
- Occupation: Small business owner

Dan Gehlbach (/ˈɡɛlbɑːk/ GHEL-bahk; born 1977) is an American politician, small business owner, former teacher and former auditor who has represented the 46th district of the Iowa House of Representatives since January 2023, which covers part of northeast Dallas County and a small part of northwest Polk County, including parts of Grimes and Urbandale. He is a member of the Republican Party.

== Early life and education ==
Gehlbach was born in 1977 in Des Moines, Iowa, and was raised in Urbandale, Iowa. He graduated from Urbandale High School and attended the University of Kansas, where he received a Bachelor of Science in business administration, and Arizona State University, where he received a Master of Business Administration.

== Political career ==
Gehlbach unsuccessfully ran for a seat on the Waukee School Board in 2015. He ran again in 2019 and was elected its vice president. He resigned in November 2022 after his election to the House. Gehlbach also served on the Waukee Chamber of Commerce Board prior to his election to the school board.

Gehlbach announced his intent to run for the open 46th district of the Iowa House of Representatives in January 2022. He came in 3rd place with over 24 percent of the vote in the Republican primary on June 7, 2022. Because no candidate received 35 percent of the vote, a special convention of 16 delegates from the Iowa Republican Party was held on June 27 to choose the Republican nominee. Gehlbach was chosen with roughly 55 percent of the vote. He defeated his Democratic opponent in the general election on November 8 by over 11 points.

Gehlbach endorsed Ron DeSantis for president in 2023.

In 2024, Gehlbach filed to run for reelection. He won the Republican primary unopposed on June 4, 2024, and defeated Democrat Lynne Campbell in the general election on November 5, 2024, by over 10 points.

Gehlbach again ran for reelection in 2026, winning the Republican primary unopposed on June 2, 2026. He faced Democrat Mandy Newton Rosenow in the general election on November 3, 2026, who narrowly defeated him, winning 50.7 percent of the vote compared to Gehlbach's 49.2 percent.

During his time in the House, Gehlbach served on the Education, Local Government, Natural Resources, Appropriations, Economic Growth and Technology, and Health and Human Services committees.

Gehlbach has described himself as conservative. He opposes abortion and supports school choice and the Second Amendment. He supported Iowa's adoption of a flat income tax system in 2022.

== Personal life ==
Gehlbach has a wife, Staci, and two children. He resides with his family in Urbandale. He is a Protestant Christian.

Gehlbach owns a Mathnasium Learning Center in West Des Moines, Iowa. He is a former Certified Internal Auditor, and was employed in the healthcare, gaming, and publishing industries. He also taught English to high school students in Japan for two years.

== Electoral history ==
*=incumbent

| Election | Political result | Candidate | Party | Votes | % |
|---|---|---|---|---|---|
| Iowa House of Representatives Republican primary elections, 2022; District 46; Turnout: 1,801 | Convention held to choose nominee (newly redistricted) | None | | | |
| Iowa House of Representatives Republican primary elections, 2022; District 46; Turnout: 1,801 | Convention held to choose nominee (newly redistricted) | Jeremy Freeman | Republican | 584 | 32.4 |
| Iowa House of Representatives Republican primary elections, 2022; District 46; Turnout: 1,801 | Convention held to choose nominee (newly redistricted) | Dan Kelley | Republican | 461 | 25.6 |
| Iowa House of Representatives Republican primary elections, 2022; District 46; Turnout: 1,801 | Convention held to choose nominee (newly redistricted) | Dan Gehlbach | Republican | 445 | 24.7 |
| Iowa House of Representatives Republican primary elections, 2022; District 46; Turnout: 1,801 | Convention held to choose nominee (newly redistricted) | Esperance Hope Ikora | Republican | 163 | 9.1 |
| Iowa House of Representatives Republican primary elections, 2022; District 46; Turnout: 1,801 | Convention held to choose nominee (newly redistricted) | Dave Dicks | Republican | 146 | 8.1 |
| Iowa House of Representatives Republican primary elections, 2022; District 46; Turnout: 1,801 | Convention held to choose nominee (newly redistricted) | Other/Write-in votes | | 2 | 0.1 |
| Republican Party of Iowa special convention, 2022; District 46; Turnout: 16 | Republican (newly redistricted) | Dan Gehlbach | Republican | | 55 |
| Republican Party of Iowa special convention, 2022; District 46; Turnout: 16 | Republican (newly redistricted) | Dave Dicks | Republican | | 17 |
| Republican Party of Iowa special convention, 2022; District 46; Turnout: 16 | Republican (newly redistricted) | Jeremy Freeman | Republican | | 12 |
| Republican Party of Iowa special convention, 2022; District 46; Turnout: 16 | Republican (newly redistricted) | Esperance Hope Ikora | Republican | | 11 |
| Republican Party of Iowa special convention, 2022; District 46; Turnout: 16 | Republican (newly redistricted) | Dan Kelley | Republican | | 6 |
| Iowa House of Representatives general elections, 2022; District 46; Turnout: 14,415 | Republican (newly redistricted) | Dan Gehlbach | Republican | 8,009 | 55.6 |
| Iowa House of Representatives general elections, 2022; District 46; Turnout: 14,415 | Republican (newly redistricted) | Bridget Carberry Montgomery | Democratic | 6,393 | 44.3 |
| Iowa House of Representatives general elections, 2022; District 46; Turnout: 14,415 | Republican (newly redistricted) | Other/Write-in votes | | 13 | 0.1 |
| Iowa House of Representatives Republican primary elections, 2024; District 46; Turnout: 529 | Republican | Dan Gehlbach* | Republican | 515 | 97.4 |
| Iowa House of Representatives Republican primary elections, 2024; District 46; Turnout: 529 | Republican | Other/Write-in votes | | 14 | 2.6 |
| Iowa House of Representatives general elections, 2024; District 46; Turnout: 19,722 | Republican | Dan Gehlbach* | Republican | 10,868 | 55.1 |
| Iowa House of Representatives general elections, 2024; District 46; Turnout: 19,722 | Republican | Lynne Campbell | Democratic | 8,834 | 44.8 |
| Iowa House of Representatives general elections, 2024; District 46; Turnout: 19,722 | Republican | Other/Write-in votes | | 20 | 0.1 |
