= Hung Hom Estate =

Public housing estate in Hung Hom, Hong Kong

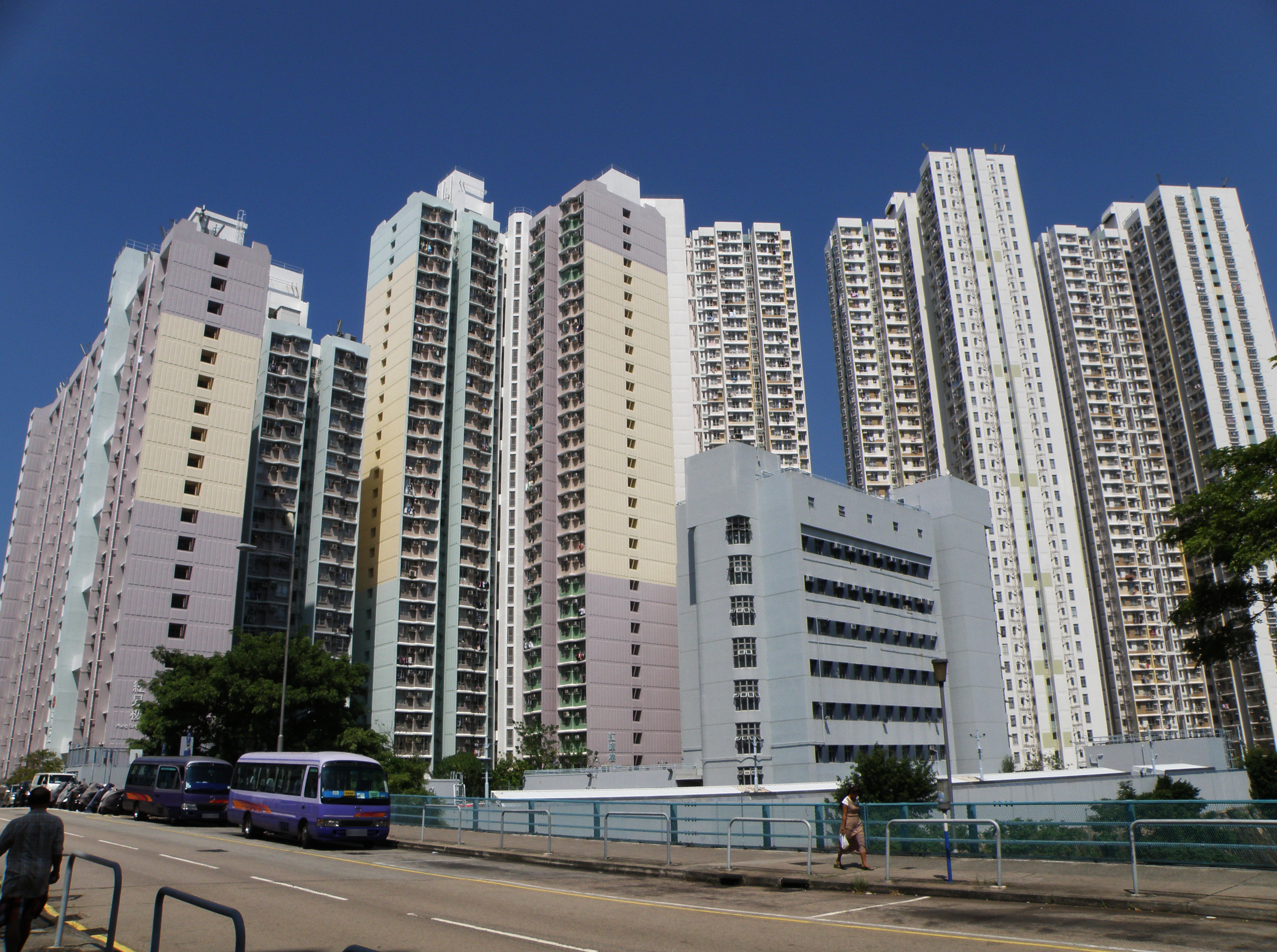
- Hung Hom Estate
- Interactive map of Hung Hom Estate

General information
- Location: 9 Dyer Avenue, Hung Hom; Kowloon, Hong Kong (Phase 1); 28 Tai Wan Road, Hung Hom; Kowloon, Hong Kong (Phase 2)
- Coordinates: 22.30737°N 114.18894°E
- Status: Completed
- Category: Public rental housing
- Population: 6,623 (2016)
- No. of blocks: 5
- No. of units: 2,800

Construction
- Constructed: 1999; 27 years ago (Phase 1); 2011; 15 years ago (Phase 2)
- Authority: Hong Kong Housing Authority

Hung Hom Estate (Chinese: 紅磡邨) is a public housing estate in Hung Hom, Kowloon, Hong Kong. The estate is built on a hill along Dyer Avenue and next to Whampoa Estate, Whampoa Garden and MTR Whampoa station. It now consists of five residential buildings completed in two stages in 1999 and 2011 respectively.

== Background ==
The estate, informally called Tai Wan Shan Resettlement Estate (大環山徙置區) or Tai Wan Shan Estate (大環山邨), was a resettlement estate built in Tai Wan Shan, a hill in Hung Hom area. It had four 7-storey blocks completed in 1956. All four blocks were demolished for redevelopment in 1996 and 2000. Completed in 1999, redevelopment phase 1 project consists of two residential buildings built in the former site of Block 3 and 4. Redevelopment phase 2, finished in 2011, consists of three more 40-storey buildings on the former site of Block 1 and Block 3.

== Houses ==
Name	Chinese name	Building type	Completed
Hung Fai House	紅暉樓	Harmony 3	1999
Hung Sing House	紅昇樓	Small Household Block	1999
Hung Yat House	紅日樓	Non-standard Block	2011
Hung Yan House	紅昕樓	Non-standard Block	2011
Hung Yiu House	紅曜樓	Non-standard Block	2011

== Demographics ==
According to the 2016 by-census, Hung Hom Estate had a population of 6,623. The median age was 52.6 and the majority of residents (97.5 per cent) were of Chinese ethnicity. The average household size was 2.4 people. The median monthly household income of all households (i.e. including both economically active and inactive households) was HK$20,000.

== Politics ==
Hung Hom Estate is located in Ka Wai constituency of the Kowloon City District Council. It is currently represented by Chau Hei-man, who was elected in the 2019 elections.

== See also ==
- Public housing estates in Hung Hom, To Kwa Wan and Ma Tau Wai
