= Max Llewellyn =

Max Llewellyn may refer to:

- Max Llewellyn (rugby union) (born 1999), Welsh rugby union player
- Max Llewellyn (American football) (born 2002), American football linebacker
