= Mandy Newton Rosenow =

American politician

Member-elect of the Iowa House of Representatives from the 46th district
- Assuming office January 1, 2027
- Succeeding: Dan Gehlbach

Personal details
- Party: Democratic

Mandy Newton Rosenow is an American politician who is Member-elect of the Iowa House of Representatives from the 46th district.
