= Fisherman's Wharf =

Fisherman's Wharf may refer to:

== Places ==
- Fisherman's Wharf, San Francisco, a tourist destination and still-functioning wharf, in San Francisco, California
- Fisherman's Wharf (Monterey, California), a historic fishing wharf in Monterey, California
- Tamsui Fisherman's Wharf, a wharf located in Tamsui (Danshui) District, New Taipei, Taiwan
- Kaohsiung Fisherman's Wharf, a wharf located in the city of Kaohsiung, Taiwan
- Fisherman's Wharf, the former name of The Laguna Mall, a shopping mall located in Tai Wan, Hong Kong
- Macau Fisherman's Wharf, a theme park located in Macau

== Entertainment ==
- Fisherman's Wharf (Stan Rogers' song), a Stan Rogers' song on the Fogarty's Cove album
- Fisherman's Wharf (film), a 1939 American drama film
