= Macau Fisherman's Wharf =

Theme park in Macau, China

Macau Fisherman's Wharf Doca dos Pescadores 澳門漁人碼頭

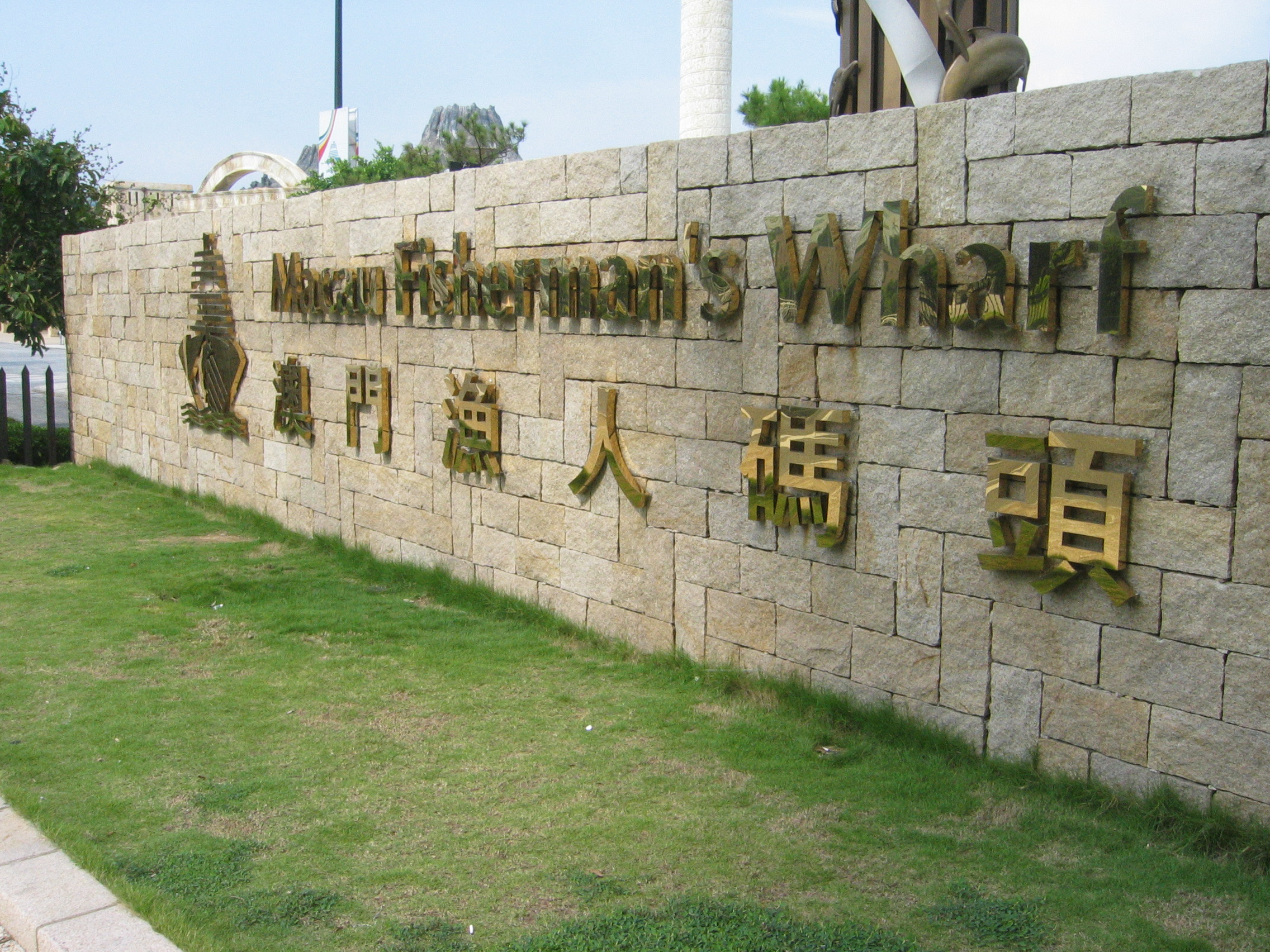
- Interactive map of Macau Fisherman's Wharf; Doca dos Pescadores 澳門漁人碼頭
- Location: Avenida da Amizade e Avenida Dr. Sun Yat-Sen Sé, Macau
- Coordinates: 22°11′29.23″N 113°33′23.79″E
- Opened: December 31, 2006
- Website: http://www.fishermanswharf.com.mo/en/

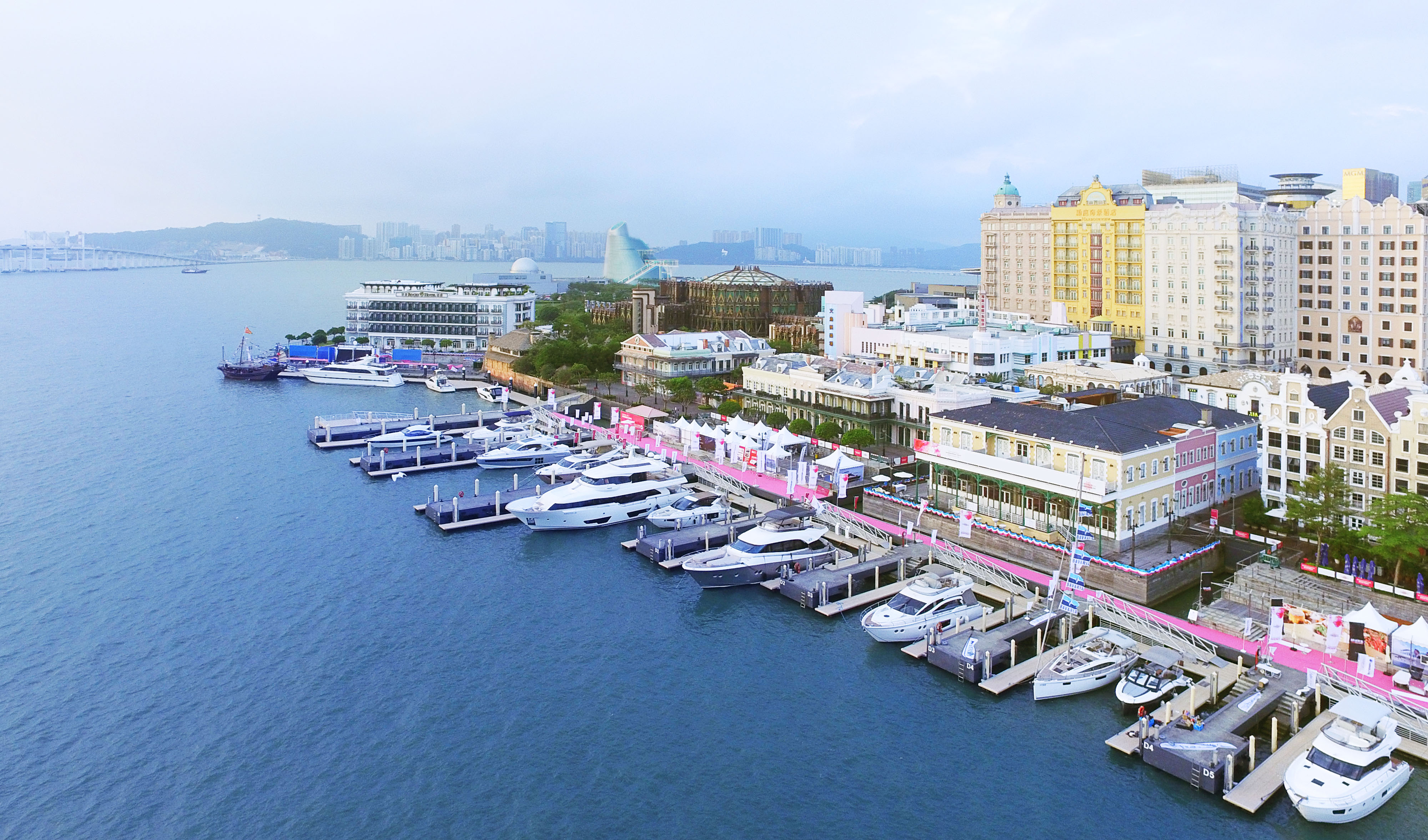
Marina at Macau Fisherman's Wharf

The Macau Fisherman's Wharf (Chinese: 澳門漁人碼頭; Portuguese: Doca dos Pescadores) is a themed entertainment, retail and hotel complex and former amusement park in Sé, Macau, China.

== History ==
The construction of the theme park took 5 years, before an opening ceremony by the Chief Executive of Macau and trial operation began on December 31, 2005. After one year of trial operation, the wharf was officially opened on December 31, 2006.

== Architecture ==
The complex includes over 70 stores and restaurants in buildings built in the style of different world seaports such as Cape Town, and Amsterdam, a convention and exhibition centre, a marina, two hotels and a casino spanning over 133,000 square metres (1,430,000 sq ft) of area. The theme park gets 40% of its area from reclamation from the sea.

== Visitor attractions ==
Today operating only as a commercial district, the park was formerly home to several amusement rides including the country's first rollercoaster, located inside the artificial volcano on which a replica of the Potala Palace sits. The coaster, which travelled through several themed dioramas intended to give the illusion of flying around the world, was closed at some point after 2007 due to an unspecified accident. Other amusements included a magic carpet ride, bumper cars, a flying carousel, a paintball arena and a children's miniature train ride. A replica of the Colosseum serves as a venue for concerts and other performances, and other facilities on the site include the Victorian-themed Rocks Hotel, the Czech Baroque-themed Harborview Hotel, a large convention and exhibition center, the Legend Boulevard shopping and dining street, and the Babylon Casino.

== See also ==
- List of Macao-related topics
- Fisherman's Wharves in other places
