= Eddie Berlin =

American football player (born 1978)

No. 82, 86
- Position: Wide receiver

Personal information
- Born: January 14, 1978 (age 48); Urbandale, Iowa, U.S.
- Listed height: 5 ft 11 in (1.80 m)
- Listed weight: 194 lb (88 kg)

Career information
- High school: Urbandale
- College: Northern Iowa
- NFL draft: 2001: 5th round, 159th overall pick

Career history
- Tennessee Titans (2001–2004); Chicago Bears (2005); New England Patriots (2006)*
- * Offseason or practice squad member only

Career NFL statistics
- Receptions: 26
- Receiving yards: 379
- Receiving touchdowns: 2
- Stats at Pro Football Reference

Edward Walton Berlin (born January 14, 1978), is an American former professional football player who was a wide receiver in the National Football League (NFL). He played college football for the Northern Iowa Panthers and was selected by the Tennessee Titans in the fifth round of the 2001 NFL draft. He played for the Chicago Bears in 2005.

== Early life ==
Berlin was born in Urbandale, Iowa, where he attended Urbandale High School and won varsity letters in football, baseball, and track. In baseball, he was a two-time All-State honoree. He has a younger brother, Tommy, who also played football and went to Northern Iowa.

== College career ==
Berlin attended University of Northern Iowa and was selected a Division I-AA All-American in 2000.

== Coaching career ==
Berlin served as Assistant Coach at Grand View College from 2007 through 2009.
