= Olmsted Family Farmhouse =

Historic house in Iowa, United States

- U.S. National Register of Historic Places
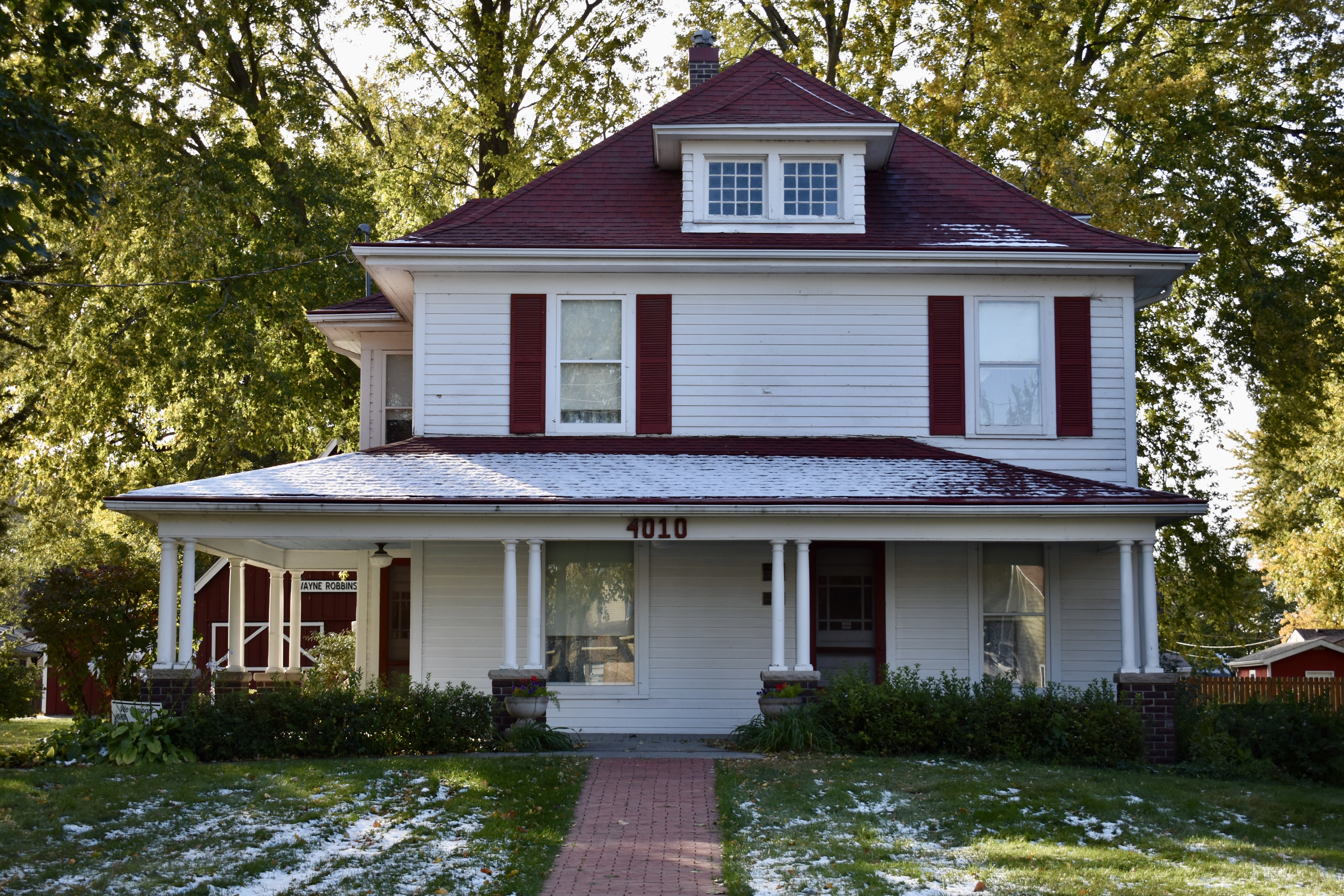

- Location within Iowa Location within the United States
- Location: 4010 70th St. Urbandale, Iowa
- Coordinates: 41°38′0.5″N 93°42′45.9″W
- Built: 1904
- Architectural style: American foursquare
- NRHP reference No.: 100004230
- Added to NRHP: August 6, 2019

The Olmsted Family Farmhouse, also known as the Olmsted-Urban House, is an historic building located in Urbandale, Iowa, United States. Leander and Charlotte Olmsted from Auburn, New York acquired 80 acres (32 ha) of land in Polk County, Iowa in 1867. They built a house on the property where they raised their sons Millard and Clarence, and bought additional land for their farm. In 1904, about the time Millard married his wife Olive, Leander had this two-story, frame, American foursquare house built.

Millard and Olive helped Leander farm and they raised their six children here. Both Millard and his brother Clarence were influential in the formation of Urbandale in 1917 with Clarence serving on the first town council and Millard on the school board. In 1937, 10 acres (4.0 ha) of the farm were platted for building lots. Karl and Matie Urban acquired the house in 1947, and the Urbandale Historic Society bought the house from their estate in 1987. They converted it into their headquarters and to house their collection of Urbandale memorabilia. The house was listed on the National Register of Historic Places in 2019.
