= Paul J. Springer =

American author and historian (born 1975)

Paul J. Springer is an American author, professor, and military historian.

== Early life ==
Singer was born in Iowa in 1975. He attended Urbandale High School in Urbandale, Iowa and Texas A&M University, earning a BS in Psychology in 1997 and a PhD in Military History in 2006.

== Career ==
He became a history professor at the Air Command and Staff College and taught at the United States Military Academy at West Point. He appeared as a consultant and interview subject for programs on the History Channel, the Discovery Channel, and the National Geographic Channel. Springer was named a Senior Fellow of the Foreign Policy Research Institute in 2014.

== Publications ==
- America's Captives: Treatment of POWs from the Revolutionary War to the War on Terror.
- Military Robots and Drones: A Reference Handbook, part of the Contemporary World Issues series examining the global approach to military robotics and artificial intelligence.
- Transforming Civil War Prisons: Lincoln, Lieber, and the Laws of War with Glen Robins, a book analyzing the ways in which prisons of the American Civil War changed over the course of the conflict.
- Cyber Warfare: A Reference Handbook, part of the Contemporary World Issues series examining the global approach to conflict within the cyber domain.
- 9/11 and the War on Terror: A Documentary and Reference Guide (ISBN 9781440843341), a collection of 100 primary-source documents relating to the War on Terror, with analysis of each.
- Encyclopedia of Cyber Warfare (editor), a work detailing the myriad elements of cyber warfare.
- Outsourcing War to Machines: The Military Robotics Revolution, an analysis of how the use of autonomous military vehicles is transforming human conflict.
- Daily Life of U.S. Soldiers a 3-volume series with Christopher R. Mortenson, examining the experiences of the U.S. Army.
- Propaganda from the American Civil War, a collection of 100 examples of Civil War propaganda, with analysis of each.
- Cyber Warfare: A Documentary and Reference Guide, a collection of 85 documents related to cyber warfare, with analysis.
- Sharing the Journey: A Military Spouse's Perspective, with Dawn A. Goldfein and Katelynne R. Baier.
