= Urbandale High School =

Secondary school in Iowa, US

Urbandale High school

Location
- 7111 Aurora Avenue; Urbandale, Iowa 50322; United States; 41°38′12″N 93°42′55″W

Information
- Type: Urbandale High School
- Motto: UHS will change the world
- Established: 1936
- School district: Urbandale Community School District
- Superintendent: Ty Sharon
- CEEB code: 161220
- NCES School ID: 192868001659
- Principal: Tim Carver
- Staff: 93.28 (FTE)
- Grades: 9-12
- Enrollment: 1,311 (2023-2024)
- Student to teacher ratio: 14.05
- Colors: Navy Blue; White with Red
- Athletics conference: Central Iowa Metropolitan League (CIML)
- Mascot: J-Hawks
- Information: 515-457-6800
- Website: Urbandale High School

Urbandale High School (UHS) is a public high school in Urbandale, Iowa. It is the only high school in the Urbandale Community School District.

== History ==
Until 1937, students wishing to pursue a high school education traveled to other cities, as Urbandale did not have high school facilities. The first year of high school education in Urbandale was the 1936–1937 school year. A gymnasium with a stage was completed in 1940 with Works Progress Administration funding. A new building was finished in 1963, with additions in 1978 and 1981. Another new building opened in 2007.

== Athletics ==
The J-Hawks are members of the Central Iowa Metro League, and participate in the following sports:

- Fall
  - Football
    - 1975 Class 3A State Champions
  - Volleyball
  - Cross Country
    - Boys' 2-time Class AA State Champions (1968, 1970)
  - Boys' golf
  - Girls' Swimming
- Winter
  - Basketball
  - Bowling
    - Boys' 2-time Class 2A State Champions (2016, 2017)
  - Wrestling
    - 1996 Class 3A State Champions
    - 1996 Class 3A State Duals Champions
  - Boys' swimming
- Spring
  - Track and field
  - Soccer
    - Boys' 3-time State Champions (1998, 2002, 2025)
    - Girls' 2001 State Champions
  - Tennis
    - Boys' 1997 Class 2A State Champions
    - Girls' 2002 Class 2A State Champions
  - Girls' golf
- Summer
  - Baseball
    - 4-time Class 4A State Champions (2000, 2007, 2018, 2019)
  - Softball
    - 3-time State Champions (1976, 1977, 1986)

== Performing arts ==
UHS has multiple bands, many choirs along with Urbandale’s mixed choir, Urbandale Singers, a theater program, two competitive show choirs, the mixed-gender "Studio" and "Vitality". The program has been hosting an annual competition since 1983.

== Notable alumni ==
- Eddie Berlin, football player
- Dan Gehlbach, member of the Iowa House of Representatives
- Pat Hoberg, Major League Baseball umpire
- Allen Lazard, football player
- Max Llewellyn, defensive end for the Miami Dolphins

== See also ==
- List of high schools in Iowa
