= Urbandale Community School District =

Public school district in Urbandale, Iowa, United States

Coordinates: 41.637457°N 93.770847°W

Location
- Urbandale, Iowa Polk County United States
- Coordinates: 41.637457, -93.770847

District information
- Type: Local school district
- Grades: K-12
- Superintendent: Dr. Rosalie Daca
- Schools: 6
- Budget: $65,125,000 (2020-21)
- NCES District ID: 1928680

Students and staff
- Students: 4,308
- Teachers: 294.13 FTE
- Staff: 337.94 FTE
- Student–teacher ratio: 14.65
- Athletic conference: Central Iowa Metro League
- District mascot: J-Hawks
- Colors: Blue and White with red accent

Other information
- Website: www.urbandaleschools.com

Urbandale Community School District is a public school district headquartered in Urbandale, Iowa.

It serves a portion of the Urbandale city limits, and is entirely in Polk County.

In January 2018 the district presented a plan to replace four elementary schools built in the 1950s and 1960s-Jensen, Olmsted, Rolling Green and Valerius with two new buildings.The two new buildings were named Olmsted and Valerius with Karen Acres becoming a year-round school.

== Schools ==
Secondary schools:

- Urbandale High School
- Urbandale Middle School

Primary schools:

- Karen Acres Elementary School
- Olmsted Elementary School
- Valerius Elementary School
- Webster Elementary School

Preschools:

- AdventureTime

Other:

- Metro West Learning Academy

== See also ==
- List of school districts in Iowa
