= Des Moines Christian School =

Private school in Urbandale, Iowa, United States

Coordinates: 41.629°N 93.798°W

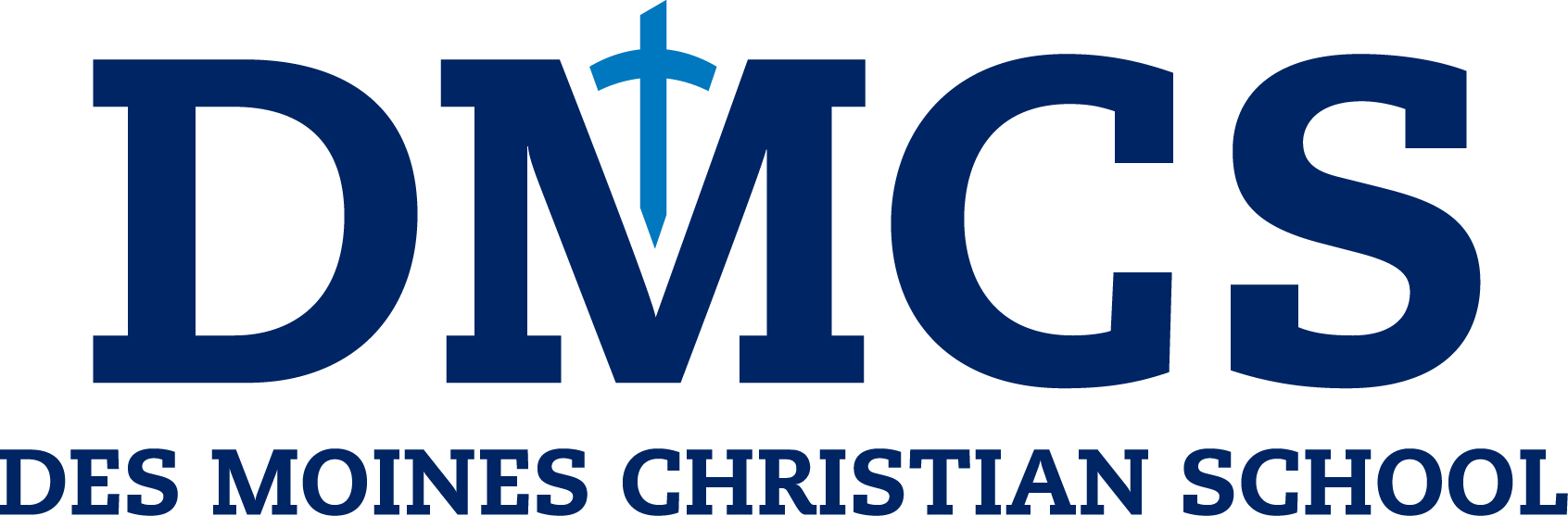
- Urbandale, Iowa; United States

Information
- Type: Private Christian
- Motto: "Equipping minds and nurturing hearts to impact the world for Christ"
- Established: June, 1947
- Superintendent: Cade Lambert
- Grades: Early Education-12
- Colors: Blue and White
- Athletics: Jon Muller
- Mascot: Lion
- Affiliation: Christian
- Website: https://www.dmcs.org/

Des Moines Christian School is a private Christian school that opened in 1948 on the campus of First Federated Church in Des Moines, Iowa, United States. In 1980, the school moved to the former Franklin Junior High School building, and in 1983 added ninth grade. In 1988, the State of Iowa granted accreditation to grades 7 through 12 (the elementary had already been accredited).

== History ==
=== Conception ===
Des Moines Christian School was founded in June 1947 by Grant Klinefelter when he saw that there was no safe area for Christian students in the Des Moines area. He decided to elect an evangelical school board, adopt a constitution, and formulate bylaws for a parent-inspired school. In 2006 the school moved to its current location in Urbandale, Iowa.

=== Early years ===
In 1948, classes opened in the basement of First Federated Church with fifteen students and one teacher. In 1949, expansion to Grace Baptist Church became necessary due to a need for more space. In 1951, both campuses consolidated and the parents decided to purchase a full city block (2.5 acres) at 62nd and Franklin Avenue and erect a school building. In September 1955, Des Moines Christian School opened its doors for the first time with approximately 135 kindergarten through eighth grade students and seven teachers.

=== Expansion ===
In August 1980, Des Moines Christian School moved to the former Franklin Junior High School building located at 48th street and Franklin Avenue, where they rented it from First Federated Church, which was also occupying part of the building. In September 1983, Des Moines Christian added a secondary school department, which included 9th through 12 grades. In 1987, Des Moines Christian School graduated twenty-nine students in its first senior high graduation ceremony. In January 1988, Des Moines Christian became accredited from the State of Iowa for grades 7-12 (the elementary had previously received accreditation.) In September 1995, they received accreditation from the Association of Christian Schools International (ACSI). In the fall of 2005, Des Moines Christian School moved out of the rented space at First Federated Church and into their own facility in Urbandale, a suburb on the west side of Des Moines.

=== Recent years ===
Starting in the 2017–18 school year, the school added a new addition, with a second gymnasium, and new rooms for the vocal and instrumental music classes. This year also introduced the split of the Secondary section into the High School and Middle School - this overhaul brought sixth grade over to the Secondary area as a mix of the elementary and the middle school. This update also moved most of the high school classrooms to the second floor and the middle school classes to the main floor.

The 2018–19 school year brought a change to the high school schedule, importing a new "flexible schedule", which uses 30 "blocks" per day to create a five-day schedule. Classes consist of various amounts of blocks per day. As of the 2019–2020 school year, the high school has moved to a six-day schedule, each with 30 "blocks". This was intended to provide students with more free time during the day, and to prepare them for what a college schedule may be like, however, many students find that it doesn't work because of conflicting schedules between High and Middle School.

The 2021–22 school year brought another addition to the school, when an addition to the secondary was added, which increased classroom numbers for middle and high school. In addition to this, a chapel, administrative offices, and open collaborative spaces were added. This allowed for the addition allowed for new staff to be onboarded and the student cap per grade to be increased from roughly 90 students to over 110.

The 2023–24 school year came with two new additions to the school, the first of which was a main gymnasium addition which resurfaced the floors, added a new video board, spot light system, and sound system. The other addition to the school was a 104-acre land acquisition paid for by a single donation of over $7 million. The land lays north of the current campus between NW 42nd Street and Meredith Drive and will be used as a high school once the land is developed. This land was formerly farm ground and has development plans currently being created.

Today, more than 100 different churches are represented in the school's preschool through twelfth grade. The enrollment of Des Moines Christian School is over 1300 students in grades K-12. In addition, more than 200 children are employed in the preschool and daycare program , which has been moved to the new campus. The school employs more than 200 people.

from 2026-2027 there will be a new high school and it will be built by fall of 2027 their budget is $100 million dollars.

== Administration ==
- Cade Lambert (Head of School)
- Corey Nikkel (Head of High School)
- Brian Town (Head of Middle School)
- Karla Lowe (Head of Elementary)
- Grant Klinefelter[5] (Founder)

== Athletics ==
The Lions compete in the West Central Activities Conference in the following sports:

- Volleyball
- Football
- Cross Country
- Basketball
- Track and Field
  - Boys' 2022 Class 2A State Champions
- Golf
- Baseball
- Softball
- Soccer
- Competition Cheer

Students at Des Moines Christian can also participate in the following sports for Urbandale:

- Wrestling
- Tennis
- Swimming

As of April 2024, in the 2024–25 school year the athletics program in several sports will move from class 2a to 3a for boys basketball, boys and girls cross country, track and field, baseball, and softball by the Iowa High School Athletic Association and Iowa Girls High School Athletic Union as the size of the school continues to grow. This is the second time the school has moved up a class size, the last being in the 2007–08 school year when they moved from 1a to 2a.

== See also ==
- List of high schools in Iowa
