= Max Llewellyn (American football) =

American football player (born 2002)

No. 57 – Miami Dolphins
- Position: Linebacker
- Roster status: Active

Personal information
- Born: August 16, 2002 (age 24)
- Listed height: 6 ft 6 in (1.98 m)
- Listed weight: 260 lb (118 kg)

Career information
- High school: Urbandale (Urbandale, Iowa)
- College: Iowa (2021–2025)
- NFL draft: 2026: 7th round, 238th overall pick

Career history
- Miami Dolphins (2026–present)
- Stats at Pro Football Reference

Max Llewellyn (born August 16, 2002) is an American professional football linebacker for the Miami Dolphins of the National Football League (NFL). He played college football for the Iowa Hawkeyes and was selected by the Dolphins in the seventh round of the 2026 NFL draft.

== Early life ==
Llewellyn attended Urbandale High School in Urbandale, Iowa. He played defensive end and tight end in high school. Over his final two seasons he had nine sacks on defense. He committed to the University of Iowa to play college football.

== College career ==
After redshirting his first year at Iowa in 2021, Llewellyn played in four games in 2022 and had three tackles. As a sophomore in 2023, he played in all 14 games, recording 13 tackles and 2.5 sacks. As a redshirt junior in 2024, he played in all 13 games and had 22 tackles and 5.5 sacks. Llewellyn returned to Iowa for his senior year in 2025.

== Professional career ==
Pre-draft measurables
Height	Weight	Arm length	Hand span	Wingspan	40-yard dash	10-yard split	20-yard split	20-yard shuttle	Three-cone drill	Vertical jump	Broad jump	Bench press
6 ft 5 5/8 in (1.97 m)	258 lb (117 kg)	32 1/4 in (0.82 m)	9 in (0.23 m)	6 ft 6 in (1.98 m)	4.81 s	1.64 s	2.76 s	4.48 s	7.23 s	32.5 in (0.83 m)	9 ft 7 in (2.92 m)	26 reps
All values from NFL Combine/Pro Day

Llewellyn was selected by the Miami Dolphins in the seventh round with the 238th overall pick of the 2026 NFL draft. The selection was received from the New York Jets in exchange for Minkah Fitzpatrick. Llewellyn was waived by Miami on August 31; he was re-signed to the team's practice squad the following day. On November 18, Llewellyn was signed to the active roster.
