= Laguna Verde (Hong Kong) =

Housing estate in Hung Hom, Hong Kong

Coordinates: 22.3081°N 114.1927°E

- Traditional Chinese: 海逸豪園
- Simplified Chinese: 海逸豪园
Transcriptions
Standard Mandarin
- Hanyu Pinyin: Hǎi Yì Háo Yuán
Yue: Cantonese
- Jyutping: hoi2 jat6 hou4 jyun4*2

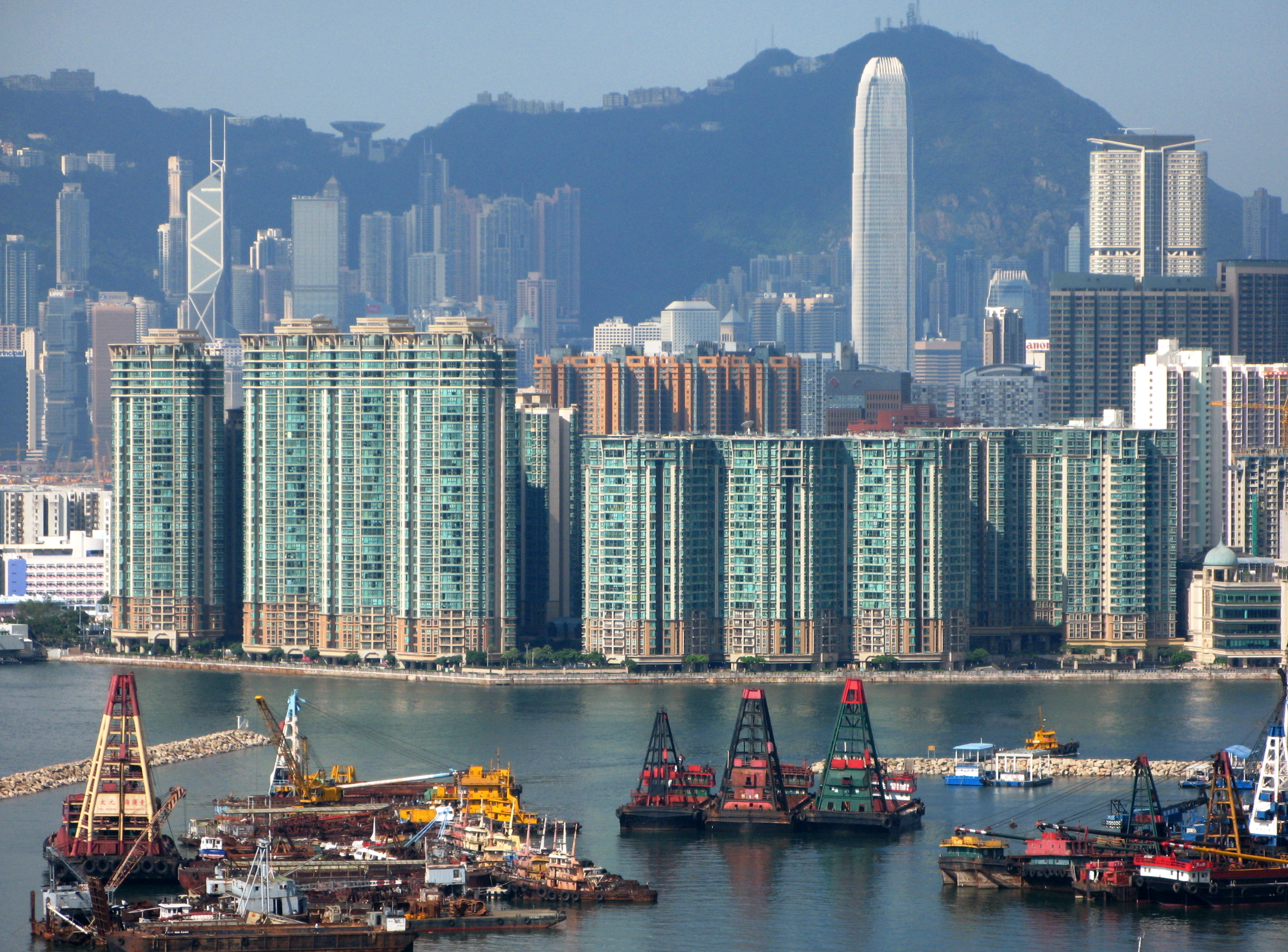
Laguna Verde in August 2009

Laguna Verde (Chinese: 海逸豪園) is a private housing estate developed by Cheung Kong Holdings, located in Tai Wan, Hung Hom, Kowloon, Hong Kong. It consists of 25 residential towers.

== Laguna Mall ==
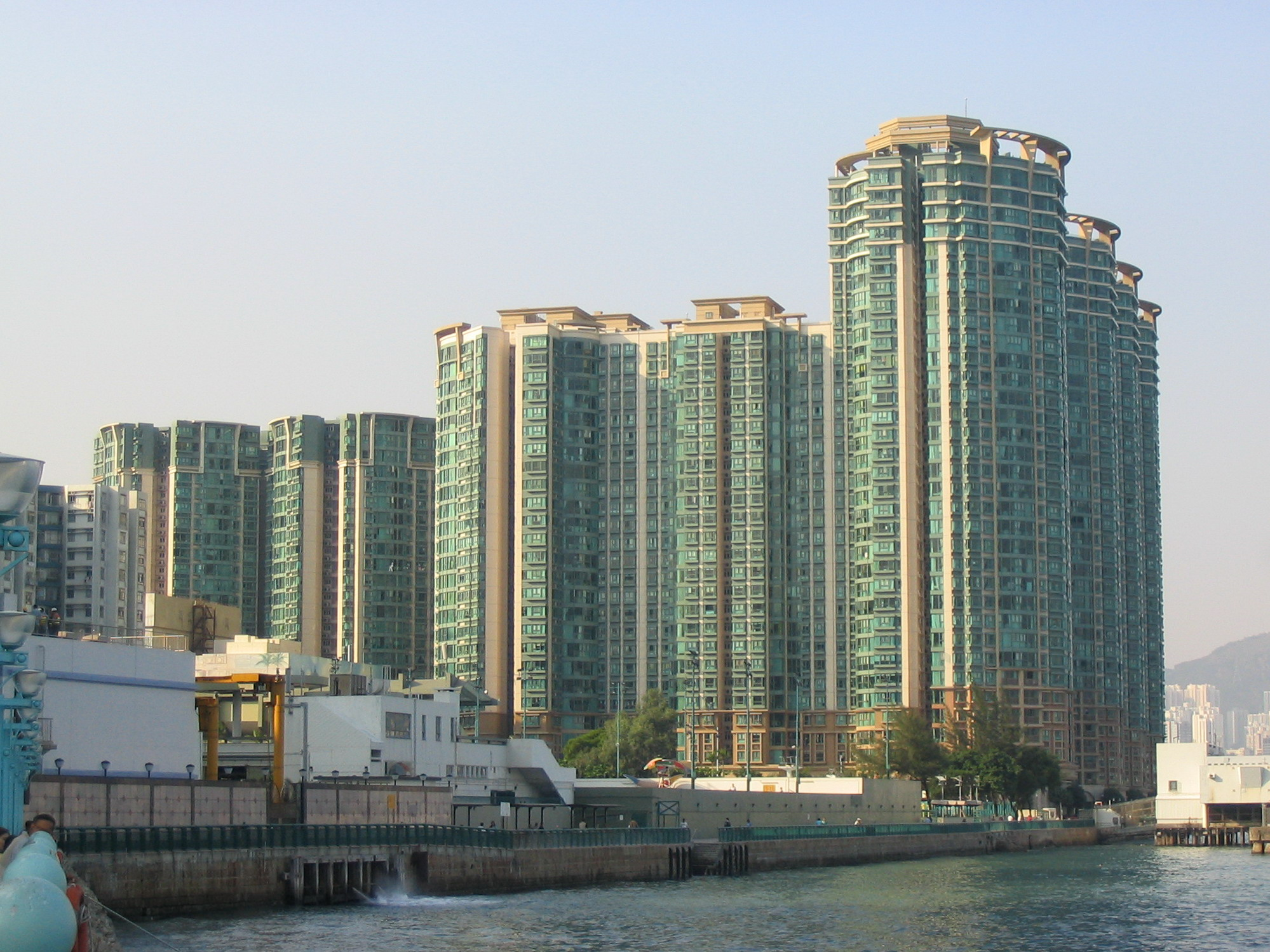
Laguna Verde in October 2004

There is a small shopping centre/office building nearby named The Laguna Mall, that was previously named Fishermen's Wharf. The Office of CLP (China Light Power) is located at the second and third floors of the shopping centre.

On the first floor are mainly tutorial centers. Tutorial Centers like Eye Level and Mathnasium are opened on the first floor. There are lower and upper ground floors. The Upper Ground Floor consists of few restaurants such as: Mister Coffee, Aji Ou Japanese restaurant, McDonald's and SD Cafe. The Lower Ground Floor consists of a Circle K convenience store, a Café de Coral fastfood restaurant that was recently closed down and a ParknShop supermarket (recently converted to Fusion). Basement Levels 2 and 3 are combined with the basement levels of the apartments.

In 2016, the mall was sold to CLP, who planned to use the building for its permanent headquarters. In 2018 they demanded tenants to leave before 2018. Under the plan, CLP would take over the vast majority of the retail space as well as part of the Lagune Verde Clubhouse space which belongs to the residents. Over 5,000 residents signed a petition to oppose the plan. After that, CLP modified the plan to vastly reduce retail space, leaving only the basement level and proposing sealing off several exits from the public.

== Clubhouse ==
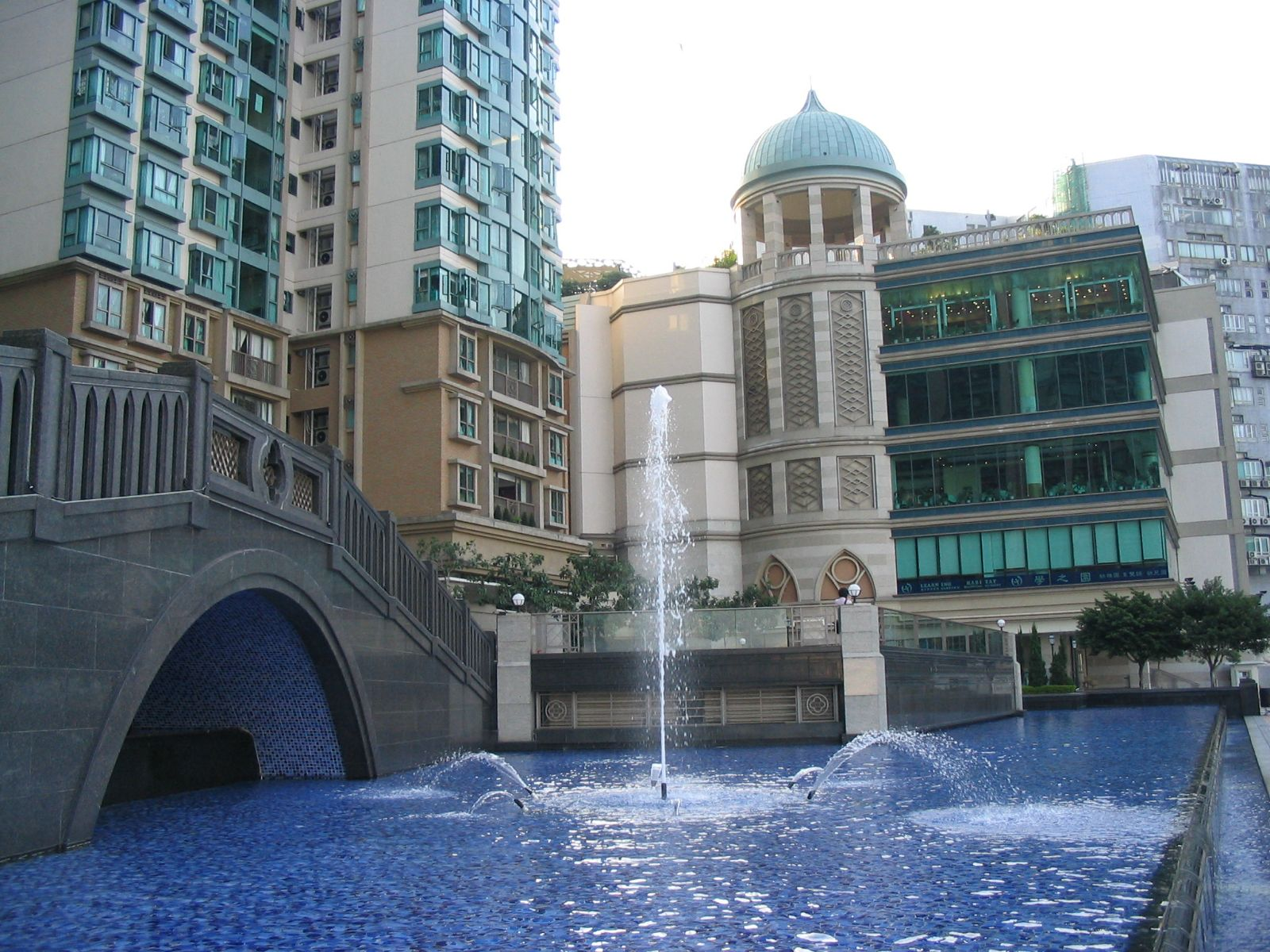
Laguna Verde in October 2004

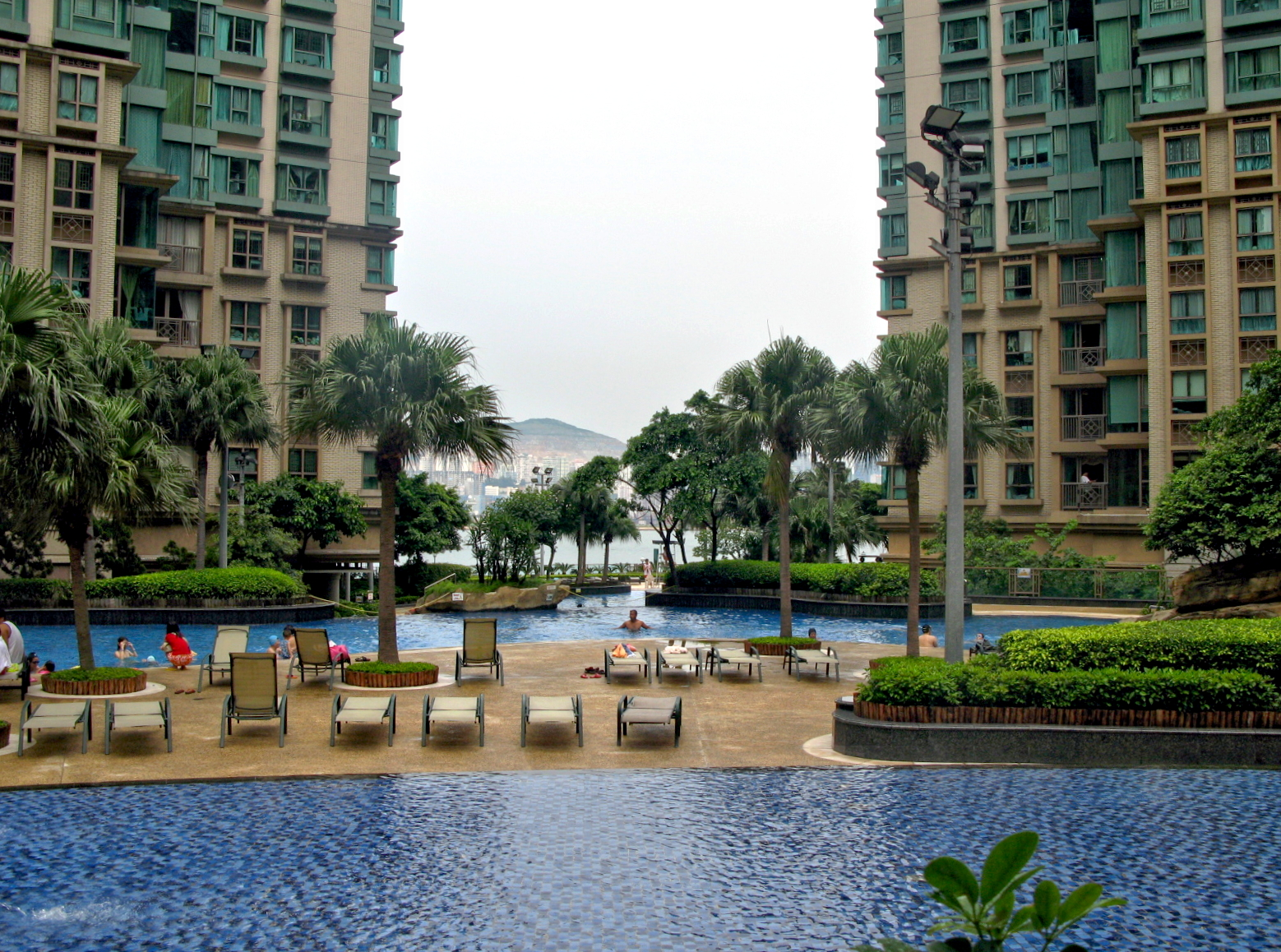
Swimming pool in the clubhouse

The Clubhouse is located between Tower 11 and 20 with large-sized swimming pools at the garden. It consists of 3 floors: The Ground Floor, Basement Level 1 and Basement Level 2.

- The Ground Floor consists of a lobby and reception centre, and across the entrance to the ground floor is the gym, which is accessible by stairs from basement level 1 or from ground level where there is another entrance.
- Basement Level 1 consists of the doorway to the changing rooms for swimming and a study room.
- Basement Level 2 consists of a few multi-purpose rooms, an indoor playground, a karaoke room, a billiards room, a squash room and 2 Table Tennis Rooms which consists of 4 tables.

Moreover, part of the clubhouse is located at the roof of Fishermen's Wharf. There is a few tennis courts, mini-golf courts, two basketball courts and an outdoor playground on the roof.

== Residential apartments ==
Laguna Verde consists of 25 Towers, with five phases. There is a total of 4,735 units.

Only partial flats in towers 8, 9, 12A, 15A, 15, 16, 17, 18, 22, 25 have a view of the harbour.

=== Phases ===
Map of each phase of the housing estate

- Phase 1 The Greenwood: Towers 1–5 (1, 2, 3, 4, 5)
- Phase 2 Villa Verde: Towers 6–10 (6, 7, 8, 9, 10)
- Phase 3 Costa Del Sol: Towers 11–15 (11, 12, 12A, 15A, 15)
- Phase 4 Laguna Grande: Towers 16–21 (16, 17, 18, 19, 20, 21)
- Phase 5 Ocean Vista: Towers 22–25 (22, 23, 23A, 25)

== Education ==
Laguna Verde is in Primary One Admission (POA) School Net 35. Within the school net are multiple aided schools (operated independently but funded with government money) and Ma Tau Chung Government Primary School (Hung Hom Bay).
