= Iowa's 46th House of Representatives district =

American legislative district

House District 46
- Type: District of the Lower house
- Location: Iowa
- Representative: Dan Gehlbach
- Parent organization: Iowa General Assembly

The 46th District of the Iowa House of Representatives in the state of Iowa. It is currently composed of part of Dallas and Polk Counties.

== Current elected officials ==
Dan Gehlbach is the representative currently representing the district.

== Past representatives ==
The district has previously been represented by:

- Joan Miller Lipsky, 1971–1973
- Jerome D. Fitzgerald, 1973–1979
- Rod Halvorson, 1979–1983
- Jean Hall Lloyd-Jones, 1983–1987
- Mary Neuhauser, 1987–1995
- Mary Mascher, 1995–2003
- Lisa Heddens, 2003–2019
- Ross Wilburn, 2019–2023
