= Tai Wan, Hung Hom =

Bay in Hung Hom, Hong Kong

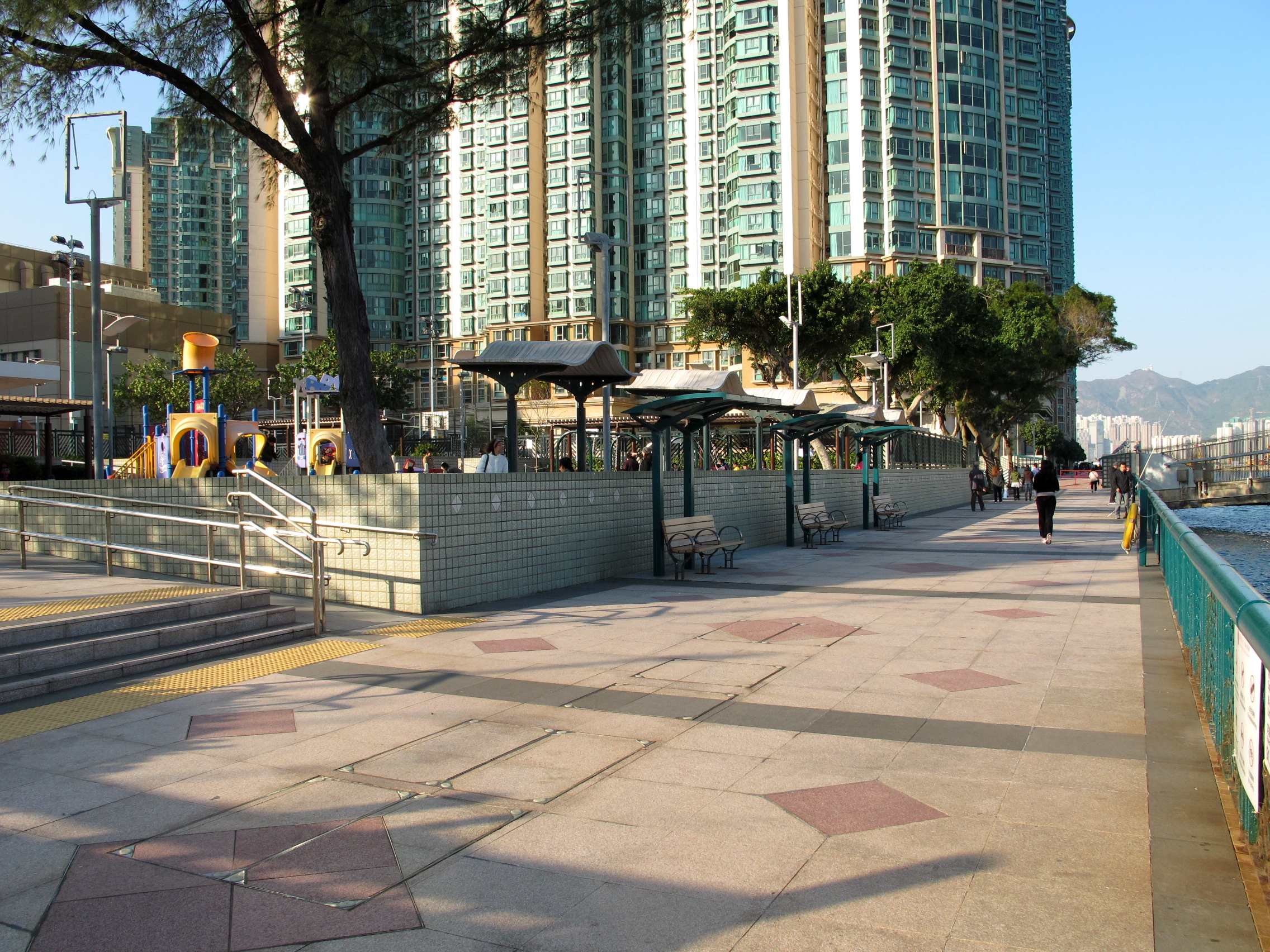
View of the Laguna Verde housing complex from Tai Wan Shan Park in December 2012

Tai Wan (Chinese: 大環, formerly 大灣) was a bay on the eastern Hung Hom, Kowloon Peninsula in Hong Kong. The southern end of the bay joined with the Hong Kong and Whampoa Dock. The name also refers to an area, which neighbours To Kwa Wan and the Whampoa Garden in Hung Hom.

Tai Wan Shan (大環山) was a hill on the coast, that was the location of the "Easy Battery" later becoming a power station belonging to China Light and Power (now CLP Power).

== Name ==
It is a common error that the character 灣 is mistakenly written with its homonym 環 in Hong Kong. This has caused major confusion amongst local people, including government officials. The name of its major thoroughfare Tai Wan Road, illustrates this phenomenon.

== History ==
At the time of the 1911 census, the population of Tai Wan was 97. The number of males was 61.

Dai Wan Shan and Kwun Yam Shan were levelled by the Hong Kong Government in the 1950s and 1960s, in order to build public housing. The Tai Wan Shan Resettlement Estate was completed in 1956, while the Hung Hom Estate was completed in 1968.

== Education ==
Tai Wan Shan is in Primary One Admission (POA) School Net 35. Within the school net are multiple aided schools (operated independently but funded with government money) and Ma Tau Chung Government Primary School (Hung Hom Bay).
