= Tai Wan Road =

Street in Hong Kong

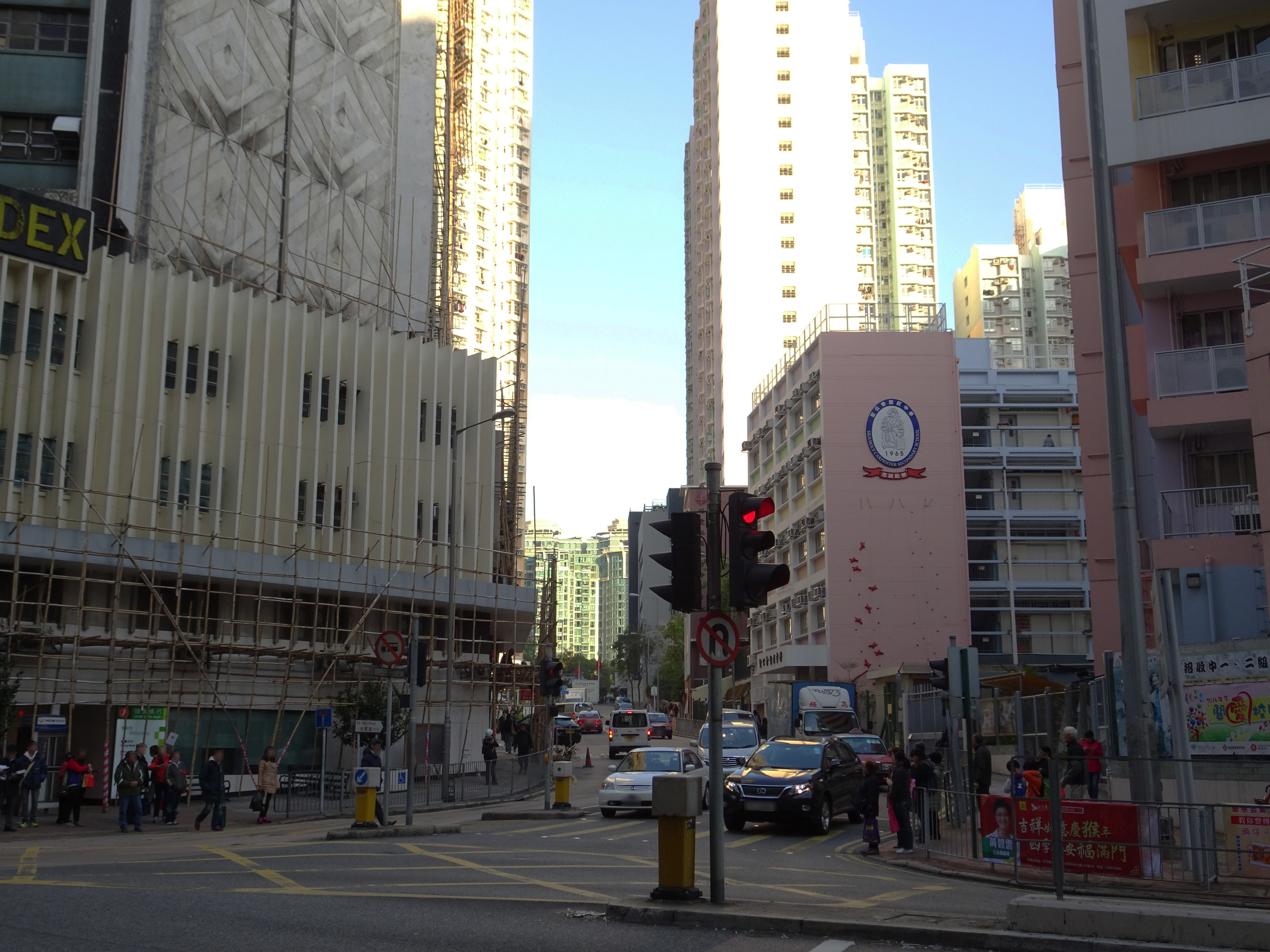
Tai Wan Road

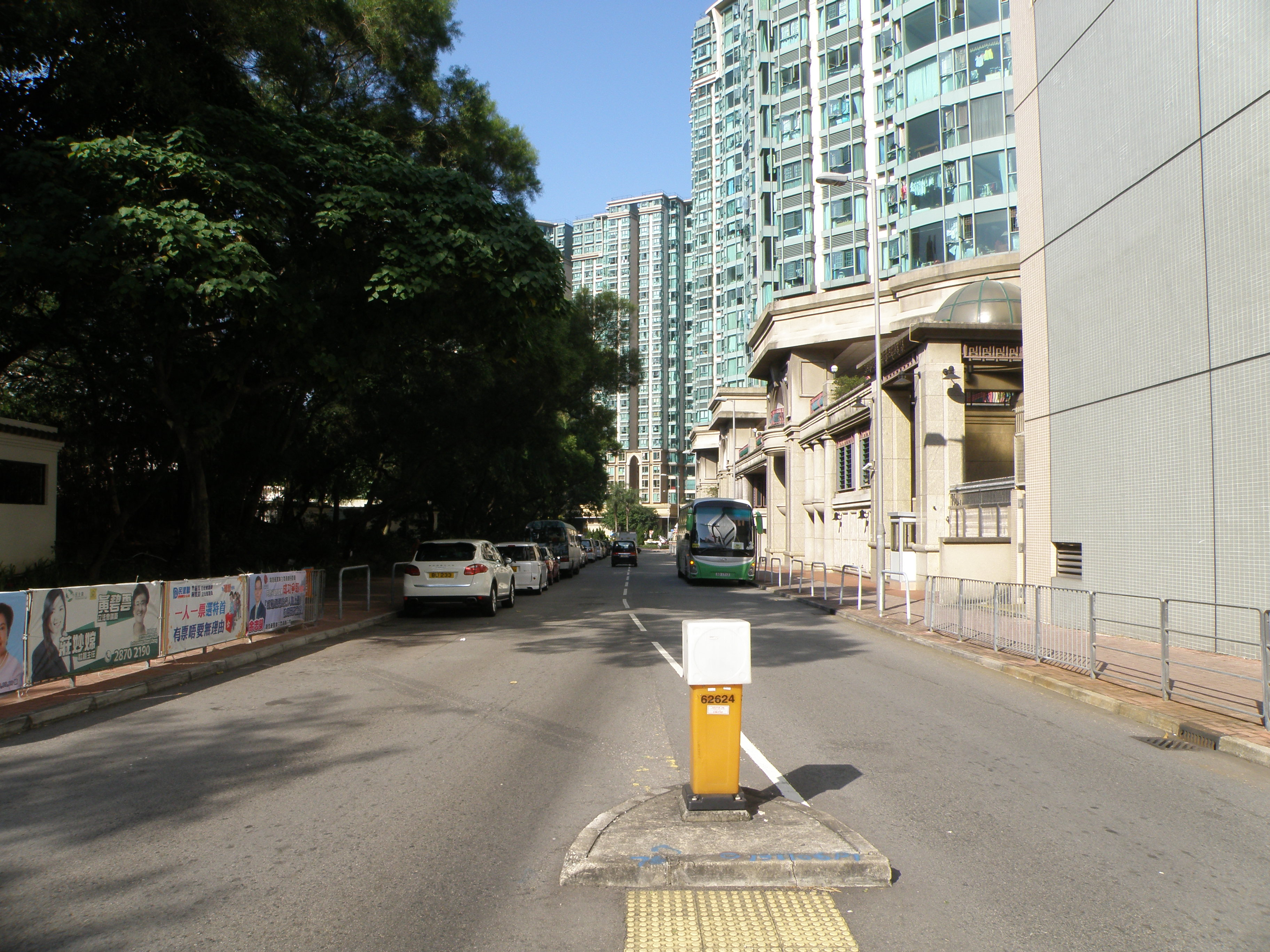
Tai Wan Road East

Tai Wan Road (Chinese: 大環道; Jyutping: daai6 waan4 dou6) is a road in Tai Wan, Kowloon, Hong Kong. It starts from Ma Tau Wai Road to Dyer Avenue.

== Name and history ==
Since 2 June 1922, the official Chinese name was 大灣道 (daai6 waan1 dou6), but it was mistaken as 大環道 on road signs and people got used to the wrong name even since. On 23 December 2005, the Hong Kong Government announced that the road will be split into two different roads and the new names will be Tai Wan Road (大環道) and Tai Wan Road East (大環道東). The change also reflects the splitting of the new road by Man Yue Street.

== See also ==
- List of streets and roads in Hong Kong
