= Mathnasium =

American supplemental math learning franchise

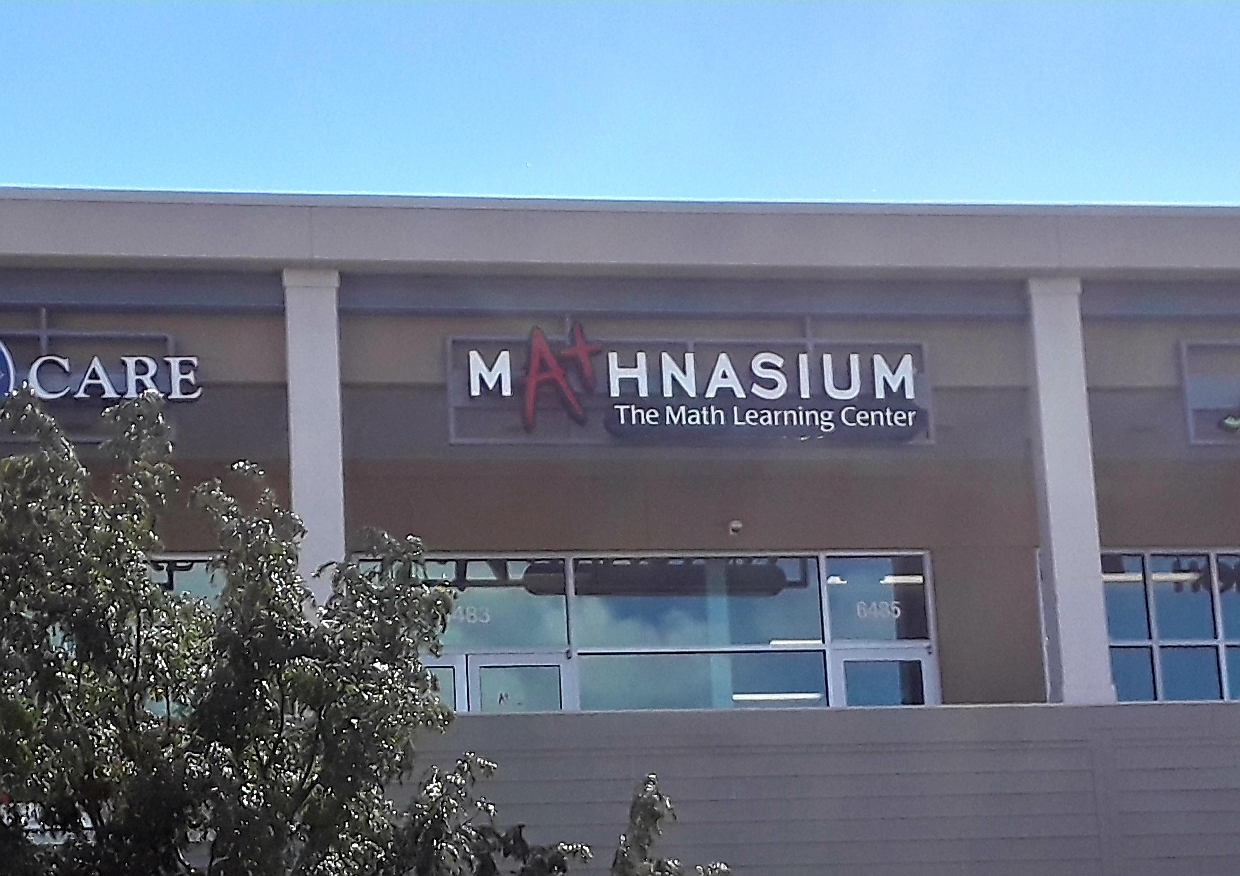
A Mathnasium location in Franconia, Virginia

Mathnasium (also Mathnasium Learning Center and stylized as MA+HNASIUM) is an American education brand and supplemental math learning franchise consisting of over 1,000 learning centers around the world (mostly in the United States), that provides instruction to students in pre-kindergarten through high school. The curriculum employs the Mathnasium Method, a proprietary system developed primarily by co-founder Lawrence Martinek, based on his decades of experience in math education.

== History ==
Larry Martinek, a Los Angeles-based mathematics educator, began writing his own supplemental materials to school curriculum. In 1985, Martinek published Math Tips for Parents, a guide for parents and teachers based on his own experiences and his work with his son. He argues that a student's dislike of math stems from the frustration and embarrassment of not understanding math the way it is taught, and that students build confidence and mastery in mathematics through successful encounter and interaction with carefully selected materials. He emphasized that an approach combining oral, visual, mental, tactile and written modalities helps children to develop number sense.

Mathnasium was founded in 2002 by Larry Martinek, David Ullendorff, and Peter Markovitz. The first center opened in Westwood, Los Angeles, California, The first center remains company-owned, while the majority of locations operate as franchises. The company began franchising in 2003. By 2019, Mathnasium had grown to over 1,000 centers across five continents. In 2019, the franchise expanded to Australia.

== Programs ==
The Mathnasium approach first revolves around an assessment to determine what a student does and does not know. Next, a learning program is made. Each student follows the program with the help of math instructors who provide instruction and encouragement. For proof of progress, Mathnasium relies on its assessments, as well as students' report cards, independent tests, and parent testimony to measure the speed and magnitude of improvement in math skills, numerical thinking, and attitude. Mathnasium separates levels of instruction into early education, elementary school, middle school, and high school. Students advance to a new level of study when they demonstrate mastery of the subject through completing mastery checks, where students have to answer a worksheet of problems correctly without help from instructors. Instructors work face-to-face with each student, and the ratio of instructors to students is typically up to 1:4. Students are encouraged to bring in homework and get help on it as well. To encourage students, work they complete counts towards prizes, and they also can have chances to be entered into drawings for bigger prizes, such as gift cards. Instructors also grade student work and make sure that each worksheet is correct, which reinforces the Mathnasium Method of focusing on getting the process correct.

== Events ==
In 2011, Mathnasium hosted a national TriMathlon, a math competition held at 160 participating Mathnasium locations. Over 4000 students competed in three challenges: The Counting Game, Magic Squares, and the Mental Math Workout. Along with medals and prizes for local 1st, 2nd, and 3rd-place winners, each participant received a certificate for achievement for their involvement. National TriMathlon winners were selected from the top three scores in each grade level from all participating Mathnasium locations. National TriMathlon winners received honors and more than $10,000 in cash prizes.

== Awards ==
In 2019, Forbes ranked Mathnasium #2 in its Best Franchises to Buy, low investment category. Entrepreneur ranked Mathnasium #17 on its Best Franchises To Buy between $100,000 and $500,000, and #27 on its Fastest Growing Franchises list. Mathnasium was also ranked #1 on the Franchise Gator Top 100 List three consecutive times.

Earlier rankings: In 2012, Entrepreneur ranked Mathnasium #112 in the Franchise 500; in 2011, Mathnasium was ranked #138; in 2010, #176; in 2009, #173; and in 2008, #197. In 2012, Entrepreneur ranked Mathnasium #44 in their list of the Fastest-Growing franchises; in 2011, Mathnasium was ranked #79; and in 2010, #77. In 2012, Entrepreneur ranked Mathnasium #94 in America's Top Global franchises; in 2011, Mathnasium ranked #114; in 2010, #138; in 2009, #135; in 2008, #98; and in 2017, #170.

== See also ==
- Storefront school
