= Urbandale, Iowa =

City in Iowa

- City
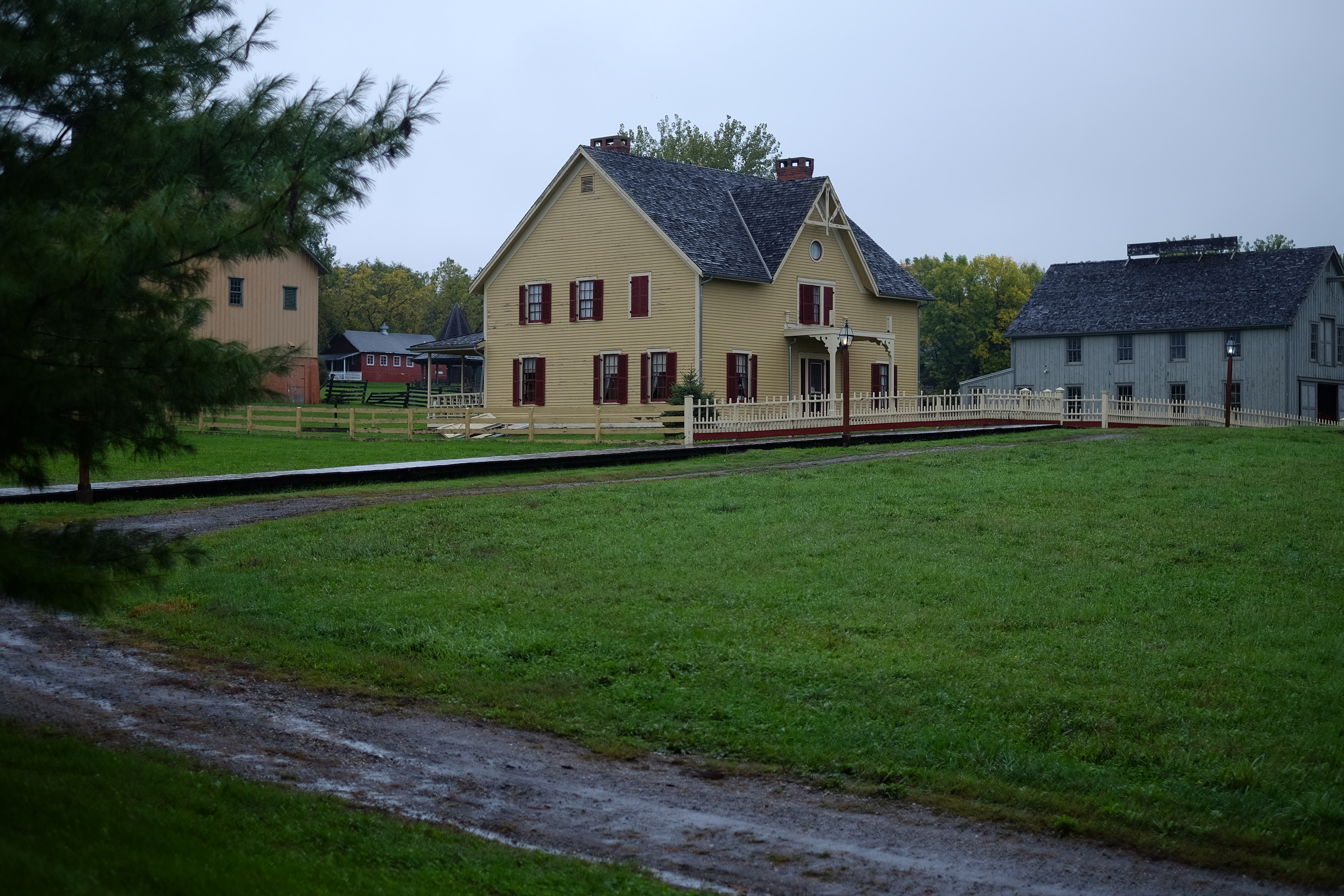
- Living History Farms, a museum in Urbandale

- Flag Logo

- Location of Urbandale in Iowa

- Location of Urbandale in the United States
- Coordinates: 41°37′51″N 93°45′15″W
- Country: United States
- State: Iowa
- Counties: Polk, Dallas
- Townships: Webster (Polk County); Walnut (Dallas County)
- Incorporated: April 16, 1917

Government
  - Type: Council-manager government

Area
  - Total: 22.55 sq mi (58.41 km^{2})
  - Land: 22.53 sq mi (58.35 km^{2})
  - Water: 0.023 sq mi (0.06 km^{2})
- Elevation: 981 ft (299 m)

Population (2020)
  - Total: 45,580
  - Rank: 12th in Iowa
  - Density: 2,023.3/sq mi (781.19/km^{2})
- Time zone: UTC−6 (Central (CST))
  - Summer (DST): UTC−5 (CDT)
- ZIP Codes: 50322, 50323, 50325, 50111, 50131, 50263,
- Area code: 515
- FIPS code: 19-79950
- GNIS feature ID: 2397100
- Website: www.urbandale.org

Urbandale is a city in Polk and Dallas counties in the U.S. state of Iowa. The city was incorporated on April 16, 1917 and was a streetcar suburb of Des Moines. As of the 2020 census, the city population was 45,580. It is part of the Des Moines–West Des Moines Metropolitan Statistical Area and is the 12th largest city in Iowa.

In recent years, Dallas County has been the fastest growing county in Iowa with population increasing more than 50% from 2010 to 2020. Even though Waukee is the main city in Dallas County that has increased population, the western part of Urbandale has also increased its population.

The Urbandale Community School District serves the city primarily, with parts of the district falling within neighboring school districts, including West Des Moines and Waukee. Interstate 35 and Interstate 80 pass through the city.

== History ==
Before Urbandale was incorporated in, citizens raised $2,000 (1912 USD) to build a two room schoolhouse, and by 1916, it was ready to be used. To avoid being part of the Johnston School District, it needed to establish their own school district and could be done if it was legally incorporated.

Urbandale was incorporated as a city on April 16, 1917. In its early days, Urbandale served as a streetcar suburb of Des Moines with four coal mines. The cars mainly served coal miners and students attending Roosevelt High School or Des Moines North High School. Transit data showed that on one day in the 1930's, 4,900 passengers would use the service, with 10 total cars being used for a 15.2 miles (24.5 km) long round trip. Urbandale served as the end of the "Urbandale Line" after plans to build a railroad from Des Moines to Woodward were abandoned because of right-of-way issues. The coal mines had closed by the end of the 1940s while streetcar service ended in 1951. Gas shuttle buses and curb liner operations took over the service, and many current DART bus routes follow the old paths of the streetcars.

In 1956, The Suburban Press brought up Urban News which remains the only Urbandale-specific news publication in the city's history. By the summer of 1956, there were 800 people subscribed to the newspaper and by 1957 it had over 2,500 subscribers.

By 1970, Urbandale had 14,434 people, and in 2000 it had 29,072. Although most of the city's developed area is in Polk County, Urbandale has expanded its city limits westward into Dallas County in recent years. In 2019, Dallas County was the 8th fastest growing county in the United States, with a 36% increase of population. Though most of the population growth was in Waukee, parts of western Urbandale also saw growth and expansion.

In 2012, President Barack Obama held a re-election campaign rally at Living History Farms in Urbandale.

== Geography ==
Urbandale is located in the northwest part of the Des Moines Metro Area at the intersections of Interstates 35 and 80, and Iowa Highway 141. According to the United States Census Bureau, the city has a total area of 21.94 square miles (56.82 km^{2}), of which 21.92 square miles (56.77 km^{2}) is land and 0.02 square miles (0.05 km^{2}) is water.

In January 2022, an agreement with the city of Grimes created an imaginary "annexation line". Both cities agreed that in the next 10 years of expansion, Urbandale could annex everything south of the line, and Grimes could annex everything north of the line. On June 17, 2025, a plan to annex 100 acres (40 ha) of land belonging to the Des Moines Christian School Association was approved. The property was previously a part of Grimes.

Urbandale is in Tornado Alley which makes it more prone to tornadoes. Urbandale has been hit by two tornadoes, an F2 on October 16, 1966, and an EF1 on July 15, 2024.

Urbandale has a humid continental climate (Dfa) under the Köppen climate classification. January averages around -5.4 °C (22.3°F) daily. Every month's average temperature is above 22 °C (71.6 °F), and seven months average above 10 °C (50 °F). The coldest temperature recorded was -35.6 °C (-32 °F) which happened on Friday, January 12, 1912. The hottest temperature recorded was 45.0 °C (113 °F) which happened on Wednesday, August 8, 1934. Summer temperatures can often climb into the 90 °F (32 °C) range, occasionally reaching 100 °F (38 °C). Humidity can be high in spring and summer, with frequent afternoon thunderstorms. Winters vary from moderately cold to bitterly cold, with low temperatures venturing below 0 °F (−18 °C) quite often. Snowfall averages 36.5 inches (93 cm) per season, and annual precipitation averages 36.55 inches (928 mm), with a peak in the warmer months.

Climate data for Des Moines International Airport, Iowa (1991–2020 normals, (Note: Mean monthly maxima and minima (i.e. the expected highest and lowest temperature readings at any point during the year or given month) calculated based on data at said location from 1991 to 2020.) extremes 1878–present (Note: Official records for Des Moines kept August 1878 to August 1939 at downtown and at Des Moines International since September 1939. For more information, see Threadex))
Month	Jan	Feb	Mar	Apr	May	Jun	Jul	Aug	Sep	Oct	Nov	Dec	Year
Record high °F (°C)	67 (19)	78 (26)	91 (33)	93 (34)	105 (41)	103 (39)	110 (43)	110 (43)	101 (38)	95 (35)	82 (28)	74 (23)	110 (43)
Mean maximum °F (°C)	53.4 (11.9)	58.7 (14.8)	74.6 (23.7)	83.9 (28.8)	88.9 (31.6)	93.1 (33.9)	96.2 (35.7)	94.4 (34.7)	91.3 (32.9)	83.3 (28.5)	70.4 (21.3)	57.8 (14.3)	97.4 (36.3)
Mean daily maximum °F (°C)	30.9 (−0.6)	35.7 (2.1)	49.2 (9.6)	62.0 (16.7)	72.4 (22.4)	81.9 (27.7)	85.6 (29.8)	83.6 (28.7)	76.9 (24.9)	63.4 (17.4)	48.3 (9.1)	35.9 (2.2)	60.5 (15.8)
Daily mean °F (°C)	22.3 (−5.4)	26.9 (−2.8)	39.4 (4.1)	51.3 (10.7)	62.4 (16.9)	72.2 (22.3)	76.0 (24.4)	73.9 (23.3)	66.2 (19.0)	53.2 (11.8)	39.3 (4.1)	27.7 (−2.4)	50.9 (10.5)
Mean daily minimum °F (°C)	13.8 (−10.1)	18.0 (−7.8)	29.6 (−1.3)	40.6 (4.8)	52.3 (11.3)	62.4 (16.9)	66.4 (19.1)	64.2 (17.9)	55.4 (13.0)	42.9 (6.1)	30.2 (−1.0)	19.5 (−6.9)	41.3 (5.2)
Mean minimum °F (°C)	−7.8 (−22.1)	−2.7 (−19.3)	9.2 (−12.7)	24.9 (−3.9)	37.6 (3.1)	50.2 (10.1)	56.9 (13.8)	54.8 (12.7)	40.4 (4.7)	26.8 (−2.9)	12.6 (−10.8)	−1.2 (−18.4)	−11.4 (−24.1)
Record low °F (°C)	−30 (−34)	−26 (−32)	−22 (−30)	9 (−13)	26 (−3)	37 (3)	47 (8)	40 (4)	26 (−3)	7 (−14)	−10 (−23)	−22 (−30)	−30 (−34)
Average precipitation inches (mm)	1.08 (27)	1.34 (34)	2.17 (55)	4.02 (102)	5.24 (133)	5.26 (134)	3.82 (97)	4.17 (106)	3.18 (81)	2.78 (71)	1.91 (49)	1.58 (40)	36.55 (928)
Average snowfall inches (cm)	9.4 (24)	10.2 (26)	4.4 (11)	1.2 (3.0)	0.2 (0.51)	0.0 (0.0)	0.0 (0.0)	0.0 (0.0)	0.0 (0.0)	0.5 (1.3)	2.7 (6.9)	7.9 (20)	36.5 (93)
Average extreme snow depth inches (cm)	6.9 (18)	7.4 (19)	4.2 (11)	0.8 (2.0)	0.2 (0.51)	0.0 (0.0)	0.0 (0.0)	0.0 (0.0)	0.0 (0.0)	0.3 (0.76)	1.7 (4.3)	4.9 (12)	10.3 (26)
Average precipitation days (≥ 0.01 in)	8.2	8.4	9.5	11.5	12.7	11.7	9.5	9.4	8.2	8.6	7.7	7.8	113.2
Average snowy days (≥ 0.1 in)	6.9	6.3	3.1	1.0	0.1	0.0	0.0	0.0	0.0	0.5	1.8	5.6	25.3
Average relative humidity (%)	71.0	71.3	67.9	63.2	63.0	64.8	67.7	70.0	70.9	66.5	71.0	74.6	68.5
Mean monthly sunshine hours	157.7	163.3	206.0	222.2	276.0	312.1	337.8	297.9	239.8	210.0	138.5	129.2	2,690.4
Percentage possible sunshine	53	55	56	56	61	69	73	70	64	61	47	45	60
Average ultraviolet index	1	2	4	6	8	9	9	8	6	4	2	1	5
Source 1: NOAA (relative humidity and sun 1961−1990)
Source 2: Weather Atlas (UV)

== Demographics ==
The median income for a household in the city was $59,744, and the median income for a family was $70,548 (these figures had risen to $69,269 and $86,885 respectively as of a 2007 estimate). Males had a median income of $45,470 versus $32,631 for females. The per capita income for the city was $29,021. About 2.5% of families and 3.7% of the population were below the poverty line, including 4.7% of those under age 18 and 4.3% of those age 65 or over.

Historical populations
Year	Pop.	±%
1920	298	—
1930	596	+100.0%
1940	1,083	+81.7%
1950	1,777	+64.1%
1960	5,821	+227.6%
1970	14,434	+148.0%
1980	17,869	+23.8%
1990	23,500	+31.5%
2000	29,072	+23.7%
2010	39,463	+35.7%
2020	45,580	+15.5%
Source:"U.S. Census website". United States Census Bureau. and Iowa Data Center; Source: U.S. Decennial Census

=== 2020 census ===
As of the 2020 census, there were 45,580 people, 17,528 households, and 12,398 families residing in the city. The population density was 2,023.3 inhabitants per square mile (781.2/km^{2}). There were 18,366 housing units at an average density of 815.3 per square mile (314.8/km^{2}), of which 4.6% were vacant; the homeowner vacancy rate was 1.1% and the rental vacancy rate was 11.3%.

99.2% of residents lived in urban areas, while 0.8% lived in rural areas.

Of the 17,528 households, 35.0% had children under the age of 18 living in them, 59.2% were married-couple households, 5.4% were cohabitating couples, 21.3% had a female householder with no spouse or partner present and 14.0% had a male householder with no spouse or partner present; 29.3% were non-families. About 24.2% of all households were made up of individuals, and 10.1% had someone living alone who was 65 years of age or older.

The median age was 39.3 years. 28.4% of residents were under the age of 20 (including 26.1% under 18), 4.5% were between the ages of 20 and 24, 25.3% were from 25 to 44, 26.0% were from 45 to 64, and 15.9% were 65 years of age or older. The gender makeup of the city was 49.2% male and 50.8% female, which equated to 96.7 males for every 100 females and 94.2 males for every 100 females age 18 and over.

Racial composition as of the 2020 census
Race	Number	Percent
White	37,855	83.1%
Black or African American	1,839	4.0%
American Indian and Alaska Native	86	0.2%
Asian	2,497	5.5%
Native Hawaiian and Other Pacific Islander	14	0.0%
Some other race	745	1.6%
Two or more races	2,544	5.6%
Hispanic or Latino (of any race)	2,225	4.9%

=== 2010 census ===
As of the 2010 United States census there were 39,463 people, 15,596 households, and 10,815 families living in the city. The population density was 1,800.3 inhabitants per square mile (695.1/km^{2}). There were 16,319 housing units at an average density of 744.5 per square mile (287.5/km^{2}). The racial makeup of the city was 91.1% White, 2.8% African American, 0.1% Native American, 3.5% Asian, 0.8% from other races, and 1.7% from two or more races. Hispanic or Latino of any race were 3.1% of the population.

There were 15,596 households, of which 35.4% had children under the age of 18 living with them, 59.2% were married couples living together, 7.2% had a female householder with no husband present, 2.9% had a male householder with no wife present, and 30.7% were non-families. 25.0% of all households were made up of individuals, and 8.8% had someone living alone who was 65 years of age or older. The average household size was 2.52 and the average family size was 3.04.

The median age in the city was 37.8 years. 26.1% of residents were under the age of 18; 6.2% were between the ages of 18 and 24; 28.9% were from 25 to 44; 27% were from 45 to 64; and 11.8% were 65 years of age or older. The gender makeup of the city was 48.4% male and 51.6% female.

== Economy ==
Urbandale's economic industry breakdown (2023)
1. Finance & Insurance (17.9%)
2. Healthcare & Social Assistance (11.8%)
3. Retail (10.5%)
4. Educational Services (8.70%)
5. Manufacturing (8.66%)
6. Professional, Scientific, & Technical Services (8.07%)
7. Other Services, Except Public Administration (4.31%)
8. Construction (4.26%)
9. Accommodation & Food Services (4.15%)
10. Administrative & Support, & Waste Management Services (3.66%)
11. Public Administration (3.38%)
12. Wholesale Trade (3.14%)
13. Transportation & Warehousing (2.88%)
14. Real Estate, Rental, & Leasing (2.41%)
15. Information (2.17%)
16. Arts, Entertainment, & Recreation (1.79%)
17. Agriculture, Forestry, Fishing & Hunting (1.61%)
18. Utilities (0.28%)
19. Management of Companies & Enterprise (0.01%)
ref:

The largest industry in Urbandale is Finance and Insurance with 17.9% of the population working in that industry. It is followed by Healthcare and Social Assistance with 11.8%, and Retail with 10.5%.

=== Urban Loop ===
The Urban Loop is a development area in the north/central portion of Urbandale and is recognized for the easily accessible network of traffic routes; including interstate access, highway access, and local road access.

Unofficially, the name Rider Corner was used locally to define the ninety-degree bend in the 35/80 interstate system that runs through Urbandale. The proposed area was officially named in the fall of 2017 and has been used by the Urbandale City Government, developers, and real estate brokers to describe the area. Some local media outlets have not discontinued use of the name Rider Corner. On October 16, 2020, a flyover ramp connected traffic from I-35/80 to Highway 141, costing $65 million, connecting Urbandale to Grimes.

While Urbandale is primarily a residential city, other development has increased in recent years, particularly in the business parks located inside the Urban Loop. This 12-mile stretch of I-35/I-80 has multiple access points to Urbandale. Businesses in the Urban Loop have high freeway visibility and traffic counts which continue to fuel the rapid growth of this area.

The Multi-State Lottery Association (MUSL), which oversees operations for its multi-state games is located in Urbandale, although Powerball is now drawn in Florida.

=== Top employers ===
According to Urbandale's 2024-2025 Comprehensive Annual Financial Report, the top employers in the city are:

#	Employer	# of employees
1	Marsh & McLennan Companies	1,000-1,100
2	Urbandale Community School District	700-800
3	Quality Manufacturing Corp.	700-800
4	MidAmerican Energy	500-700
5	U.S Postal Service	500-700
6	John Deere Intelligent Solutions	500-600
7	Unity Point at Home	500-600
8	Worldwide Logistics	300-400
9	Homemakers Furniture	300-400
10	Rain and Hail	200-300

== Transportation ==
DART route 74 serves the business parts of northwestern Urbandale and is connected to stops in Windsor Heights and the Valley West Mall. Urbandale is also in the intersection of two major interstates. Interstate 35 and Interstate 80 both run through and meet in Urbandale. Iowa Highway 141 and U.S. Route 6 also run through Urbandale. Iowa Highway 141 ends in the Urban Loop and connects to Interstate 35 and 80, while U.S. Route 6 makes up the southern border of Urbandale with Clive.

== Parks and recreation ==
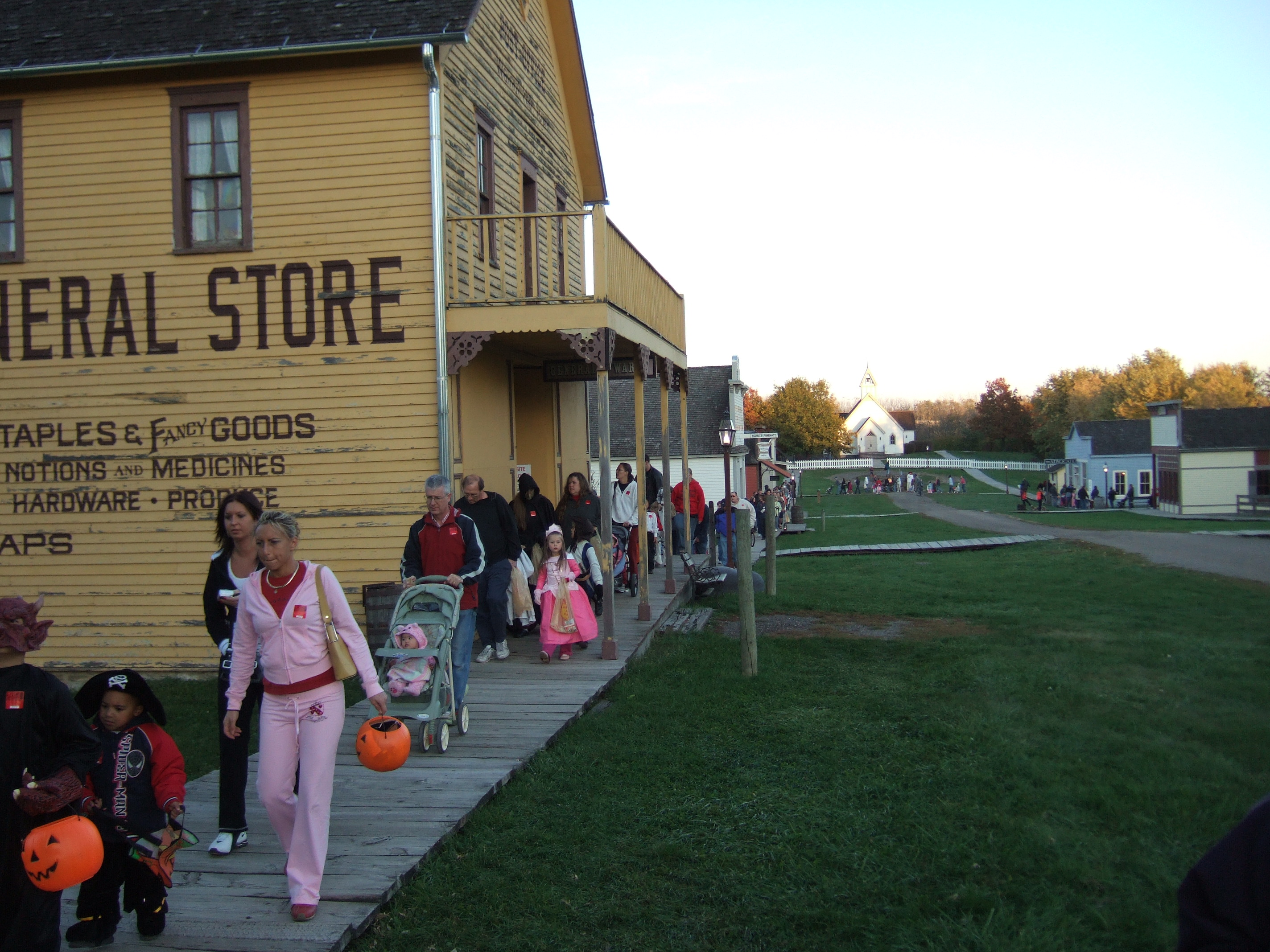
Walnut Hill, part of the Living History Farms, during 2007 Halloween event

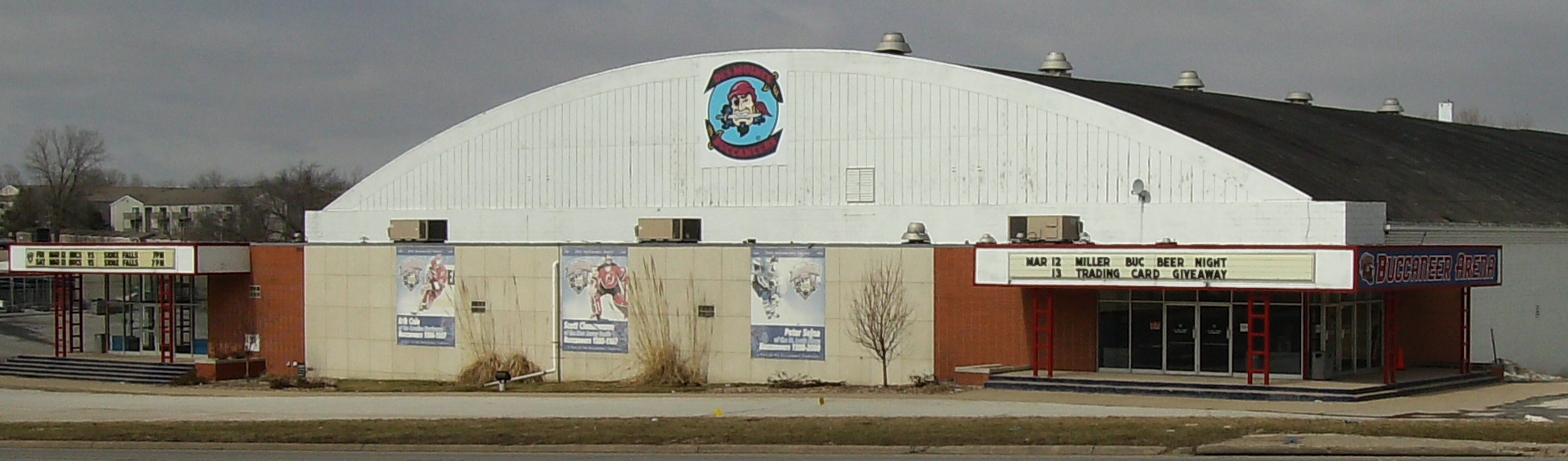
Buccaneer Arena

Urbandale features 850 acres (3.4 km^{2}) of parks and 54 miles (87 km) of recreational trails that connect to other trails in the Des Moines area.

Urbandale is the home of Living History Farms, where Pope John Paul II spoke to a crowd estimated at 350,000 on October 4, 1979. Living History Farms shows multiple different houses and buildings in Iowa from multiple time periods, including the Ioway tribe. The Buccaneer Arena, home to the Des Moines Buccaneers hockey team, is also located in Urbandale.

== Government ==
Urbandale uses the council-manager form of government. The city council consists of the mayor and five council members, all of which are elected to four-year terms. There is no limit on how many terms a person can serve. The mayor of Urbandale is Bob Andeweg.

== Culture ==
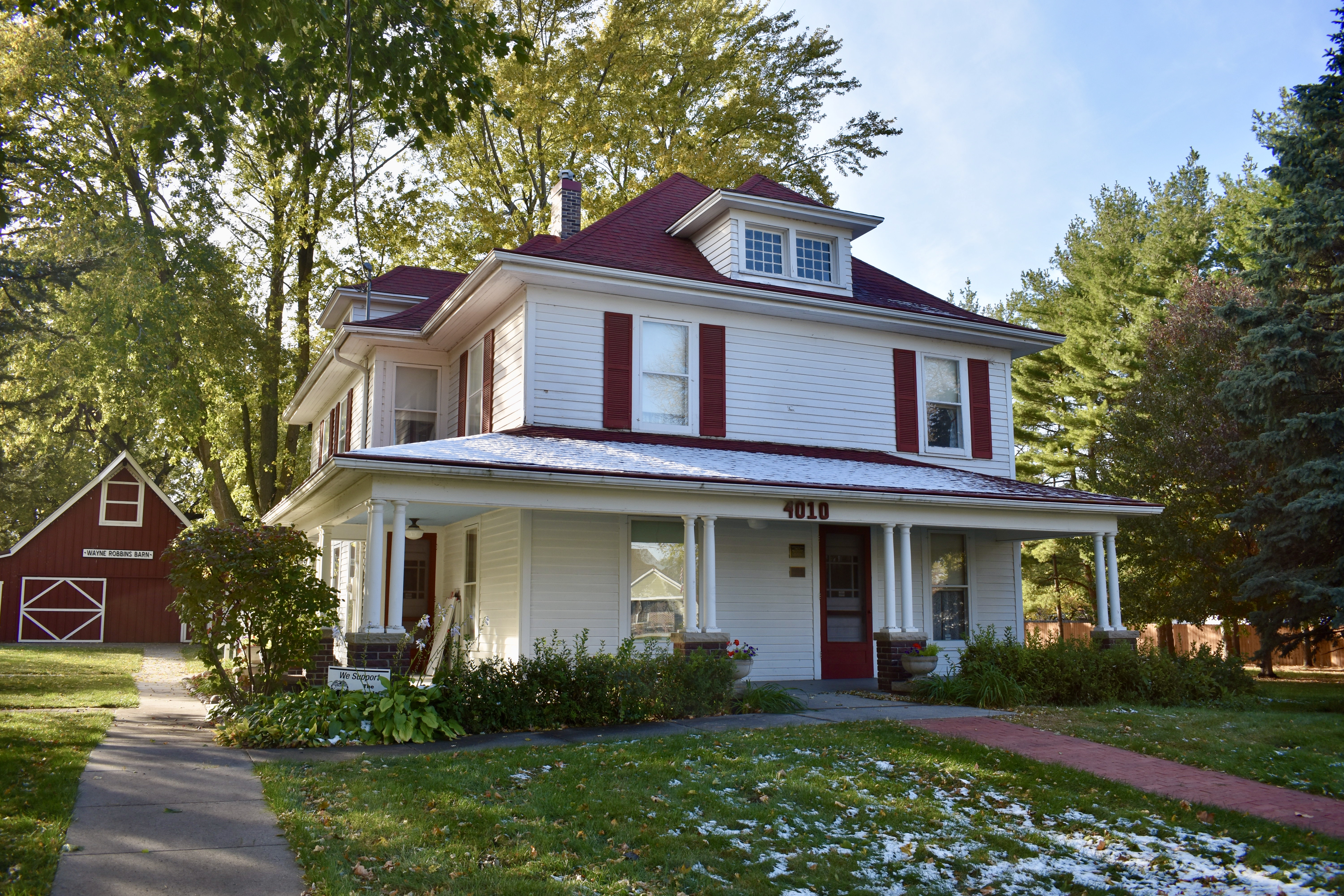
Olmstead Family Farmhouse

Urbandale has one historical site on the National Register of Historic Places, the Olmsted Family Farmhouse. In 1904, the house was built, and in 1937, 10 acres of land was used for building plots. The Urbandale Historical Society bought the house in 1987. The house was put on the National Register of Historic Places in August 2019, and it is open to the public for events and tours.

=== Beggars Night ===
Beggars Night is a term for going "Trick or Treat" in the period before Halloween night. In Urbandale, the tradition began in 1938. After Halloween celebrations were filled with violence and vandalism, Des Moines and the surrounding areas moved it to the day before Halloween to try and stop violence. In 2024, Beggars Night was moved to the day of Halloween due to severe weather. In March 2025, the Des Moines City Council voted to move Beggars Night to Halloween. The surrounding areas, including Urbandale, followed, and ended the 80 year old tradition.

== Education ==
Multiple public school districts serve portions of Urbandale: Urbandale Community School District, Dallas Center–Grimes Community School District, Des Moines School District, Johnston School District, Waukee School District and West Des Moines School District.

The Urbandale Community School District consists of six elementary schools, one middle school, and one high school (Urbandale High School). It serves Urbandale, and a part of southern Grimes.

Multiple Christian schools are located in Urbandale. Des Moines Christian School is in Urbandale and has over 1,500 students enrolled. St. Pius X Catholic School of the Roman Catholic Diocese of Des Moines is in Urbandale. It opened with an initial 120 students in September 1956. Initially its facility was one story tall and had eight classrooms, but an additional eight classrooms were added after construction began on another section on May 1, 1962. That section had two stories. The area Catholic high school is Dowling Catholic High School in West Des Moines.

== Notable people ==
- Eddie Berlin, former professional football player, Chicago Bears and Tennessee Titans
- Gannon Buhr, professional disc golf player and 2022 United States Disc Golf Championship winner
- Scott Clemmensen, former professional hockey player
- Tom Hess, professional bowler and 2011 USBC Masters champion
- Allen Lazard, professional football player for the New York Jets
- Sean Runyan, former professional baseball player, Detroit Tigers
- Paul J. Springer, author of over a dozen books and professor
