= Ankeny Community School District =

Public school district in Ankeny, Iowa, United States

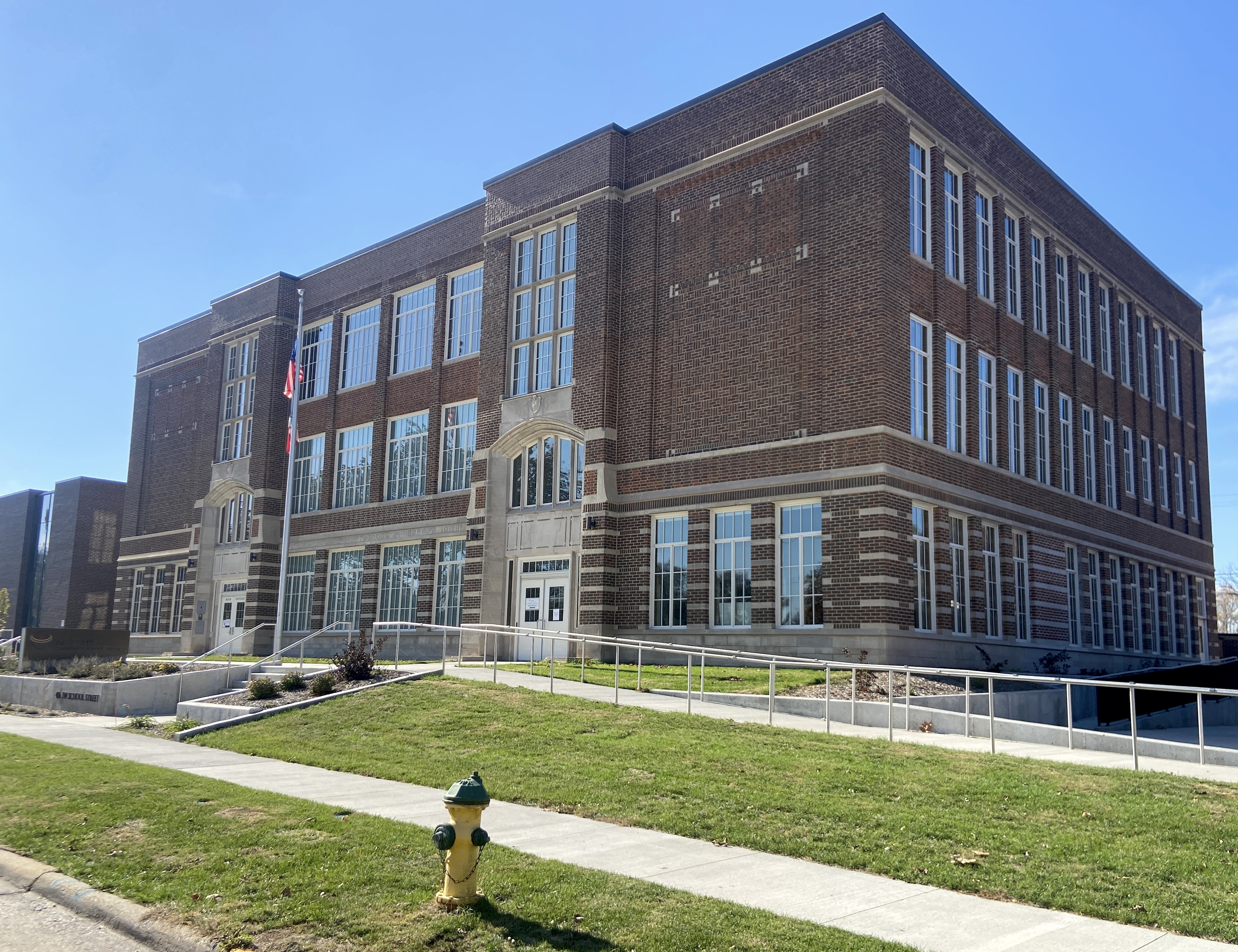
- The Neveln Center, district office

Location
- Ankeny, Iowa Midwest United States

District information
- Type: Public
- Grades: Pre-K through 12
- Established: 1850 (first graduating class in 1914)
- Superintendent: Dr. Erick Pruitt
- Accreditations: Iowa Department of Education & NCA
- Schools: 15
- Budget: $185,330,000 (2020-21)
- NCES District ID: 1903690

Students and staff
- Students: 12,750 (2022-23)
- Teachers: 797.48 FTE
- Staff: 814.24 FTE
- Student–teacher ratio: 15.99
- Athletic conference: Central Iowa Metro League
- District mascot: Hawks and Jaguars
- Colors: Maroon and Gold / Black and Silver with a Maroon Accent

Other information
- Website: www.ankenyschools.org

The Ankeny Community School District is a public school district located in Polk County, Iowa and is 6 miles (9.7 km) from the capital city, Des Moines. Headquartered in Ankeny, the district is well known in Iowa for accomplishments in academics, athletics and activities. Ankeny Schools are accredited by North Central Association of Colleges and Schools (AdvancEd) and the Iowa Department of Education, and are part of the Central Iowa Metro League (CIML).

For more than a decade, the district has been one of the fastest growing school districts in Iowa, averaging student enrollment growth of more than 300 students per year during that time. The district will serve more than 9,380 students in 2012–2013 and is the 8th largest district in the state (by total students served). By 2015-2016, the district is projected to enroll 10,446 students and by 2017–2018 the district is projected to enroll 11,282 students.

Physically, the district encompasses 51.93 square miles (134.5 km^{2}) and has more than 360,540 miles (580,230 km) driven by buses per year.

The district serves most of Ankeny, a very small portion of Polk City, and also a section of the Saylorville census-designated place.

== History ==
The first school in Ankeny was a log cabin, built in 1850, twenty years before Crocker Township was organized as a civil township. Ankeny's first school was located approximately 1 mile (1.6 km) south of town where the east entrance of the Iowa State Experimental farm joined Highway 69. This school was later re-located on the east side of Ankeny Boulevard, just south of First Street. Records show that Mr. A. H. Feigenbaum was one of the early teachers, serving in one of the one-room schools about 1880. The early roster includes other names such as Mrs. Hattie Cornwall, a Miss Benedict, Miss Maude Kennedy, and Mrs. John Wagner as a substitute.

The district's first official "graduating class" was the five-person class of 1914. Consolidation came to Ankeny in 1919, at which time the oldest part of the Neveln building was built. Several country school houses were moved to the grounds to accommodate the increased enrollment.

There was no further new construction until 1952 when the original part of the Parkview building was constructed. In 1957, the west wing was added and in 1964 an east wing was completed. In 1964, Parkview became Ankeny High School. Later, the facility was repurposed and renamed as "Parkview Middle School."

Northwest Elementary on West 1st Street was the first building to open after the original Parkview building. It was completed in 1962. Additional buildings include (in order of opening):

- East Elementary, built in 1963
- Southeast Elementary, opened in 1969
- Terrace Elementary, opened in 1972
- Northview Middle School, originally opened as "Ankeny High School" in two phases (1973 & 1975)
- Westwood Elementary, opened in 1989
- Northeast Elementary, opened in 1992
- Prairie Ridge Middle School, originally opened as "Northview Middle School" in 1995
- Crocker Elementary, opened in 2004
- Ashland Ridge Elementary, opened in 2008
- Ankeny High School, opened in 2011
- Southview Middle School, opened in 2011
- Prairie Trail Elementary School, opened in 2012
- Ankeny Centennial High School, opened in 2013
- Rock Creek Elementary, opened in 2014
- Heritage Elementary, opened in 2020

In 2009, construction began on the new Ankeny High School in Prairie Trail, and construction on the new Ankeny Centennial High School began with a groundbreaking ceremony on September 1, 2010. In August 2011, the new Ankeny High School opened, along with Phase I of Southview Middle School. At this time, the previous high school became a middle school for 8th and 9th grades. In 2011 the district also experienced its first division on the way to two secondary school systems, by moving to two 6th–7th grade middle schools: Prairie Ridge Middle School for the north feeder system and Parkview Middle School for the south feeder system.

In 2013–2014 the district opened Ankeny Centennial High School, marking the first time in four decades in which a school district in Iowa expanded to two high schools. The name, "Ankeny Centennial High School" is in honor of 100 years of graduating classes in Ankeny Community Schools. The Class of 2013 was the 100th graduating class, graduating just three months prior to the opening of the school.

At the same time, East Elementary School was expanded to accommodate three sections of students at each grade level (K-5).

The district redrew the attendance boundaries of its southern elementary schools in 2019, and began planning for a third high school that same year.

== Expansion ==
Since 2008, Ankeny Schools has been experiencing a period of rapid enrollment growth, with 300+ new students joining the school district each year. The Ankeny School district opened its second high school in 2013-2014 and now operates two, fully functioning secondary school systems.

== Academics ==
Some of the recent academic accomplishments of Ankeny students include:

• 96.4% graduation rate – No. 1 is the 6th largest district in Iowa by student enrollment (2017–2018)
• 0.25% dropout rate in grades 7-12 – (2017–2018)
• 23.3 average composite score on ACT, while state average is 21.6 and national is 20.7 (2019 grad. class)
• 1.04 (Centennial) and 1.22 (Ankeny) AP Index on the Belin and Blank Iowa AP Index (2019)

== Honors ==
- 2014 Iowa Breaking Barriers to Teaching and Learning Award - Northeast Elementary received this award as the best school in the state for reducing achievement gaps between key subgroups of students.
- 2013 U.S. News & World Report Silver Medal High School - Of more than 21,000 high schools analyzed nationwide, Ankeny High School was ranked the tenth best high school in the state and number 1,746 in the nation.
- 2013 Newsweek America's Best High Schools - Ranked 1147 on the list highlighting the best 2,000 public high schools in the nation.
- 2013 Sunny Award - First Iowa school district to earn a second Sunny Award from Sunshine Review, a national non-profit organization dedicated to government transparency.
- 2013 Recipient of the National Federation State Speech, Debate, and Theatre Award - Mr. Cary Shapiro was one of only 19 people to receive this national award in 2013.
- 2012 - 3rd Annual Advanced Placement (AP) Honor Roll - One of only 11 Iowa schools honored by the College Board with placement on the 3rd Annual AP® District Honor Roll for simultaneously increasing access to Advanced Placement® course work while increasing the percentage of students earning scores of 3 or higher on AP Exams.
- 2013 Certificate of Achievement for Excellence in Financial Reporting from the Government Finance Officers Association.
- 2012 Sunny Award - First Iowa school district to earn a "Sunny Award" from Sunshine Review, a national non-profit organization dedicated to government transparency. Only 214 agencies out of 6,000 reviewed received the award in 2012.
- 2011-2012 School Administrators of Iowa Assistant Secondary Principal of the Year - Bev Kuehn.
- 2011-2012 Iowa Association for Health, Physical Education, Recreation, and Dance Middle School Physical Education Teacher of the Year - Jodi Larson.
- 2010–2011 Bank Iowa Challenge Cup Class 4A Runner-Up – The Bank Iowa Traveling Challenge Cup is a statewide competition designed to recognize Iowa high school students for both academic excellence and outstanding achievement during state competitions. Winning schools in each of the state's four classifications (1A, 2A, 3A and 4A) with the best combined score for academics, athletics, music, speech and debate receive a crystal award and $1,500.
- 2011–2016 Accredited by both the Iowa Department of Education and AdvancED – One of only three districts in the Des Moines metro area to receive accreditation for its schools through AdvancEd. The next accreditation visits are scheduled for 2016.
- 2009–2010 Iowa Department of Education Breaking Barriers to Learning and Teaching Award – honoring districts that make significant improvements in reducing achievement gaps among key student groups.
- 2009–2010 Bank Iowa Travelling Challenge Cup 4A Champion for academic and activities excellence

== Schools ==
The district currently has 16 school buildings, using a PK, K-5, 6–7, 8–9, 10–12 grade level structure in two complete "feeder systems":

North Feeder System

- Ankeny Centennial High School
- Northview Middle School
  - Beginning in 1989 the Ankeny YMCA occupied space in the school building. In December 2018 the school district ordered the YMCA to move from the school.
- Prairie Ridge Middle School
- Ashland Ridge Elementary School
- Northeast Elementary School
- Northwest Elementary School
- Rock Creek Elementary School
- Westwood Elementary School

South Feeder System

- Ankeny High School
- Southview Middle School
- Parkview Middle School
- Crocker Elementary School
- East Elementary School
- Prairie Trail Elementary School
- Southeast Elementary School
- Terrace Learning Center

== Notable alumni ==
- Chris Fehn and Jim Root, members of Slipknot
- Dennis Albaugh, Owner of Albaugh Chemical, No. 468 on the 2009 The World's Billionaires list published by Forbes
- Dennis Gibson, linebacker for the Detroit Lions and San Diego Chargers football teams
- Pat Dunsmore, Tight end for the Chicago Bears football team
- Paul Rhoads, former head coach of the Iowa State University football team
- Benj Sampson, pitcher for the Minnesota Twins baseball team
- Connie Yori, head basketball coach of the Nebraska Cornhuskers women's basketball team and recipient of the 2010 Naismith College Coach of the Year award

== See also ==
- List of school districts in Iowa
