= Omaha Biliew =

American basketball player

No. 0 – Grand Canyon Antelopes
- Position: Power forward
- League: Mountain West Conference

Personal information
- Born: September 1, 2004 (age 21) Omaha, Nebraska, U.S.
- Listed height: 6 ft 8 in (2.03 m)
- Listed weight: 230 lb (104 kg)

Career information
- High school: Dowling Catholic (West Des Moines, Iowa); Waukee (Waukee, Iowa); Link Year Prep (Branson, Missouri)
- College: Iowa State (2023–2024); Wake Forest (2024–2026); Grand Canyon (2026–present)

Career highlights
- McDonald's All-American (2023); Jordan Brand Classic (2023); Nike Hoop Summit (2023)

Omaha Koke Biliew (born September 1, 2004) is an American college basketball player for the Grand Canyon Antelopes of the Mountain West Conference. He previously played for the Iowa State Cyclones and Wake Forest Demon Deacons. He was a consensus five-star recruit and one of the top players in the 2023 class.

== Early life and high school career ==
Biliew grew up in West Des Moines, Iowa and initially attended Dowling Catholic High School. He averaged 6.2 points and 3.6 rebounds per game as a freshman at Dowling Catholic before transferring to Waukee High School in Waukee, Iowa before the start of his sophomore year after initially stating his intention to transfer to Hillcrest Prep Academy in Phoenix, Arizona. Biliew averaged 10.9 points, 7.8 rebounds, and 3.1 blocks per game as a sophomore. He transferred to Link Year Prep in Branson, Missouri after his first year at Waukee. Biliew spent his junior year at Link Year, but transferred back to Waukee after the end of the school year. Biliew was selected to play in the 2023 McDonald's All-American Boys Game during his senior year.

=== Recruiting ===
Biliew was a consensus five-star recruit and one of the top players in the 2023 class, according to major recruiting services. On July 26, 2022, he committed to playing college basketball for Iowa State over offers from Kansas and Oregon. Biliew also considered playing professionally in the NBA G League. He is the highest-rated recruit to commit to Iowa State in the program's history.

College recruiting
Name	Hometown	School	Height	Weight	Commit date
Omaha Biliew; PF	Denison, IA	Link Year Prep (MO)	6 ft 8 in (2.03 m)	210 lb (95 kg)	Jul 26, 2022
Omaha Biliew; PF	Recruit ratings: Rivals: 247Sports: ESPN: (92)				
Overall recruit ranking: Rivals: 11 247Sports: 13 ESPN: 11
Note: In many cases, Scout, Rivals, 247Sports, On3, and ESPN may conflict in their listings of height and weight.; In these cases, the average was taken. ESPN grades are on a 100-point scale.; Sources: "Iowa State 2023 Basketball Commitments". Rivals.; "2023 Iowa State Cyclones Recruiting Class". ESPN.; "2023 Team Ranking". Rivals.

== College career ==
Biliew played sparingly at Iowa State and averaged 2.3 points and 1.3 rebounds per game. After his freshman season at Iowa State, Biliew transferred to Wake Forest. He averaged 6.3 points and 2.4 rebounds per game as a junior. Following the season Biliew transferred again to Grand Canyon.

== Career statistics ==
Legend
GP	Games played	GS	Games started	MPG	Minutes per game
FG%	Field goal percentage	3P%	3-point field goal percentage	FT%	Free throw percentage
RPG	Rebounds per game	APG	Assists per game	SPG	Steals per game
BPG	Blocks per game	PPG	Points per game	**Bold**	Career high

=== College ===
Year	Team	GP	GS	MPG	FG%	3P%	FT%	RPG	APG	SPG	BPG	PPG
2023–24	Iowa State	**20**	0	7.4	**.517**	.000	.607	1.3	.3	.3	.1	2.4
2024–25	Wake Forest	13	0	9.5	**.517**	**.385**	.667	1.5	.5	.5	**.3**	2.8
2025–26	Wake Forest	18	**17**	**19.2**	.420	.327	**.750**	**2.2**	**.6**	**.6**	**.3**	**5.7**
**Career**		51	17	12.1	.460	.323	.673	1.6	.4	.5	.2	3.6

== National team career ==
Biliew was named to the United States under-19 basketball team to play in the 2023 FIBA Under-19 Basketball World Cup.
