= Waukee Northwest High School =

High school in Waukee, Iowa, US

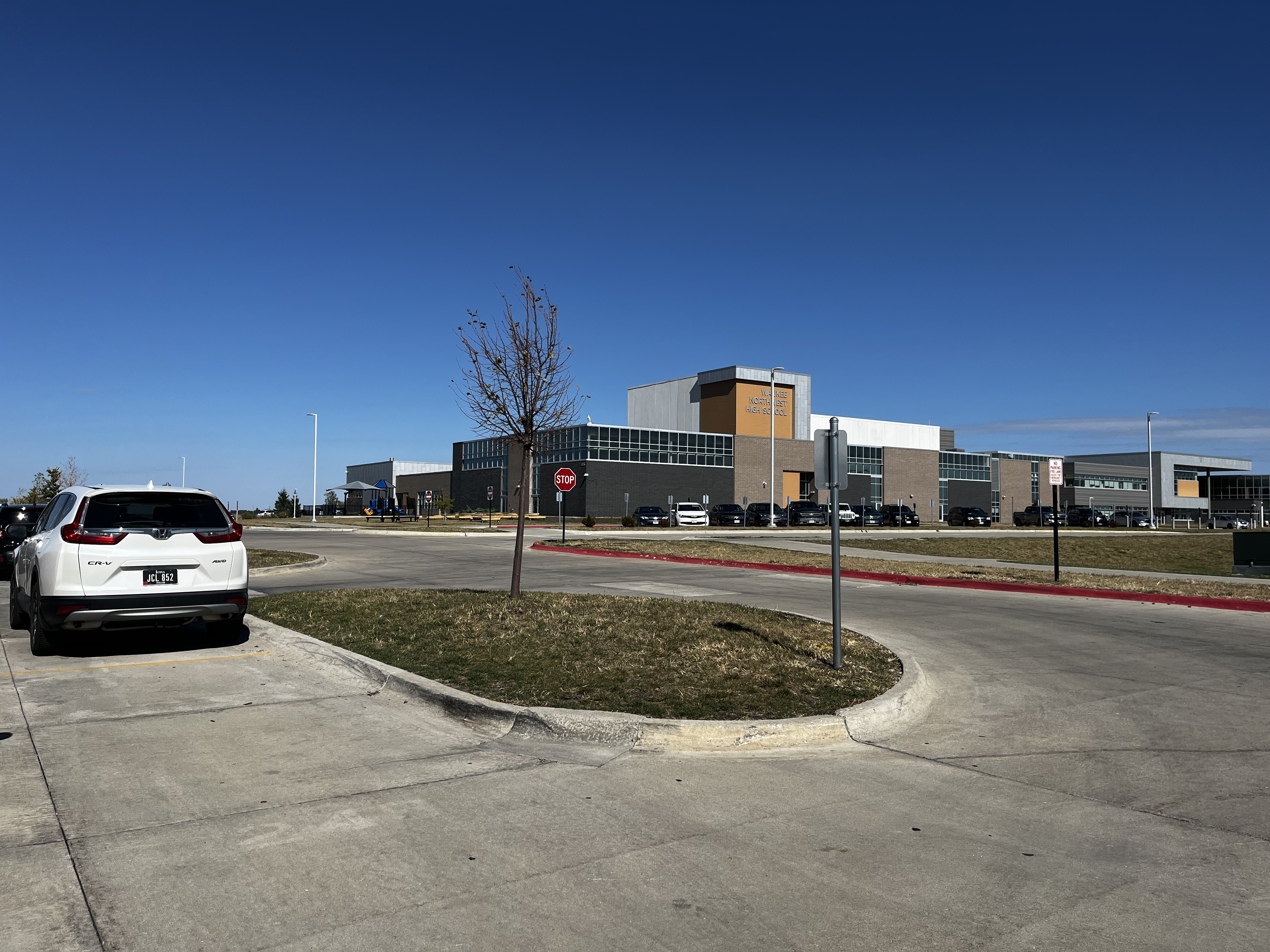

Location
- 655 NW 10th ST; Waukee, Iowa; 41°38′N 93°53′W

Information
- Type: Comprehensive public high school
- Established: August 18, 2021
- School district: Waukee Community School District
- NCES District ID: 1930510
- Superintendent: Andy Crozier
- Principal: Nick Ross
- Teaching staff: 73.32 (FTE)
- Grades: 10-12
- Enrollment: 1,574 (2024-2025)
  - Grade 10: 542
  - Grade 11: 518
  - Grade 12: 514
- Student to teacher ratio: 21.47
- Campus size: 100 acres (40.47 ha)
- Campus type: Suburban
- Colors: Blue, Silver, and Gray
- Athletics conference: Central Iowa Metro League
- Website: https://www.waukeeschools.org/schools/northwest-high-school/

Waukee Northwest High School is a high school located in Waukee, Iowa. It officially opened on August 18, 2021, and split Waukee into two different school feeders, the other school being Waukee High School. The school has three levels, and an auditorium that can hold 1,000 people.

Due to the rise in population in the city of Waukee, in 2018, voters from Waukee voted for a $117 million bond to finance the high school. Development and planning began in 2018 with plans for a sports complex being built right next to the school. The school district would own 100 acres (40 ha) of the planned property, while the city would own 60 acres (24 ha).

== Academics ==
Waukee Northwest has a graduation rate of 97%, and an 85% student progress rate. (Note: This measures student mastery of math, reading and oftentimes science state assessments based on the proportions of students who achieved each proficiency level.) They have a 69% math proficiency and a 77% reading proficiency. It contains grades 10th through 12th.

== Athletics ==
Waukee Northwest competes in class 5A, which is the highest class to compete in, for football and volleyball. It competes in class 3A in soccer which is also the highest level to compete in. It competes in the highest level in tennis for girls and boys, which is class 2A.

Waukee Northwest has won a championship in the following sports:

State Champions
Sport	Year(s)
Cross Country (Girls)	2025
Dance	2024
Soccer (Boys)	2026
Soccer (Girls)	2025, 2026
Softball	2023, 2025, 2026
Tennis (Boys)	2023, 2024
Tennis (Girls)	2025
Track & Field (Girls)	2022, 2023, 2025, 2026
Volleyball	2023, 2025, 2026
Wrestling (Girls)	2025
