= Waukee Community School District =

Public school district in Waukee, Iowa, United States

Coordinates: 41.599956°N 93.861927°W

Location
- Waukee, Iowa Dallas County United States
- Coordinates: 41.599956, -93.861927

District information
- Type: Local school district
- Grades: K-12
- Established: 1916
- Superintendent: Dr. Andy Crozier
- Schools: 20
- Budget: $207,017,000 (2021-22)
- NCES District ID: 1930510

Students and staff
- Students: 13,600 (2023-24)
- Teachers: 848.92 FTE
- Staff: 1,788.24 FTE
- Student–teacher ratio: 16.02
- Athletic conference: Central Iowa Metro League
- District mascot: Warriors (Waukee); Wolves (Northwest)
- Colors: Purple, Gold, and White (Waukee) Royal Blue, Silver, and Black (Northwest)

Other information
- Website: waukeeschools.org

Waukee Community School District (WCSD) is a public school district headquartered in Waukee, Iowa. Entirely in Dallas County, it serves Waukee and portions of Clive, Urbandale and West Des Moines.

The district has about 13,600 students from preschool through twelfth grade and more than 2,000 staff members.

== Enrollment ==
From 2004 to 2015, enrollment increased by 470 students annually. In the fall of 2016 the district made a plan to modify its attendance boundaries across the board.

Waukee is one of the fastest growing districts in the state of Iowa, and has seen dramatic growth since 2000.

Students in this district hail from Clive, Urbandale, Waukee, and West Des Moines. There is also an open enrollment options for students that are within 56 square miles of the Waukee District.

== History ==
In 1916, a petition was made to form the Waukee Consolidated School District merging Walnut Center, Pleasant View, Floral Valley, and Waukee Independent School Districts and portions of Boone township and Van Meter. In 1953, the district was renamed as Waukee Community School District.

=== Mascot ===
The district previously had a Native American logo but discontinued use of it in 1998. It did not have a logo since then and instead used a "W". When the University of Wisconsin-Madison told the district that its logo was too similar to its own, the district modified the design of the "W". In 2016 it adopted a Spartan-style warrior as its mascot.

=== List of Superintendents ===
- H. P. Simpson – 1916
- J. W. Radebaugh – 1917
- Chas. F. Core – 1918
- A. A. Sefert – 1919
- George W. Guthrie – 1920 to 1923
- W. S. Smiley – 1923 to 1927
- Chester J. Hartman – 1927 to 1943
- S. J. Wassom – 1943 to 1945
- Roger K. Langer – 1945 to 1952
- William N. Morris – 1952 to 1957
- Kenneth E. Bryant – 1957 to February 20, 1964
- Vince J. Meyer – February 1964 to June 1964
- Clair E. Eason – July 1964 to July 15, 1994
- Veronica Stalker – July 15, 1994 to December 31, 2004
- Dr. David J. Wilkerson – December 31, 2004 to January 31, 2017
- Cindi McDonald – February 1, 2017 to June 30, 2019
- Dr. Bradley Buck – July 1, 2019 to July 1, 2026
- Dr. Andy Crozier - July 1, 2026 to present

== Schools ==
=== Elementary schools (K-5) ===
- Eason was built from 1993 to 1994, opening for the 1994-95 school year. It cost $2.6 million to build, which came from a $5.2 million bond that was issued in December 1992. It was named for then-Superintendent Clair Eason to honor his service of 30 years as superintendent from 1964 to 1994. It has been remodeled in 2002, 2016, and 2021.
- Brookview was built from 2000 to 2001, opening for the 2001-02 school year. It was remodeled in 2002, 2004, and 2021.
- Walnut Hills was built from 2004 to 2005, opening in July 2005 for the 2005-06 school year. The 95,000 square foot building cost $11.5 million to build, which partially came from a $9.2 million bond that was issued on April 13, 2004.
- Maple Grove was built from 2006 to 2007, opening for the 2007-08 school year. It cost $14.2 million to build, which came from a $15 million bond issued on February 1, 2006.
- Waukee was built from 2009 to 2010, opening for the 2010-11 school year. It cost $12 million to build. It was financed by a $70 million bond that was issued in March 2008.
- Shuler was built from 2009 to 2010, opening for the 2010-11 school year. It cost $12 million to build, financed by the 2008 bond.
- Woodland Hills was built from 2012 to 2013, opening for the 2013-14 school year. The 98,515 square foot building cost $12 million to build.
- Grant Ragan was built from 2015 to 2016, opening for the 2016-17 school year. It was named for General Lewis A. Grant and Major William Ragan. These men had bought the original land that would later become Waukee. It cost $18.5 million to build.
- Radiant was built from 2018 to 2019, opening for the 2019-20 school year. It was named in honor of the coal mining history of the city, specifically the Radiant Coal Company. It cost $21.4 million to build.
- Sugar Creek was built from May 2020 to 2022, opening for the 2022-23 school year. It cost $19 million to build
- Waterford was built from 2023 to 2024, opening for the 2024-25 school year. It cost $29 million to build, with the high cost being attributed to "disruptions of the COVID-19 pandemic, worker shortages, the fallout of the Russian invasion of Ukraine..."

=== Middle schools (Grade 6th and 7th) ===
- Waukee Middle was built from 1973 to 1974, opening for the 1974-75 school year. It was originally built as the new high school. It then changed over to a middle school in 1997, with the building of the newer high school. It was remodeled in 1977, 1987, 1994, 1999 and 2008.
- South Middle was built from 2009 to 2010, opening for the 2010-11 school year. It was estimated to cost between $20 million and $27.4 million to build, but ended up costing $22 million that was financed by a $70 million bond that was issued in March 2008. It was remodeled in 2021.
- North Middle was built from 2023 to 2025, opening for the 2025-26 school year. It is about 130,000 square feet and cost $50 million. There will also be a 500 seat stadium, soccer, football, baseball and soccer fields and a running track. It opened on August 25, 2025.

=== Grade 8th and 9th schools ===
- Prairieview was built from 2003 to 2004, opening for the 2004-05 school year. It cost $16.5 million and was paid for by a $21 million bond issued early in 2002. It was remodeled in 2009 and 2021.
- Timberline was built from 2014 to 2015, opening for the 2015-16 school year. It cost $16.69 million to build, paid for by a district bond in April 2014.
- Trailridge School was built from 2022 to 2023, opening for the 2023-24 school year. It cost $50 million to build.

=== High schools (10th through 12th) ===
- Waukee High School was built in 1997 and a dedication ceremony was held on October 1, 1997. This was to replace the older higher school built in 1974 that was running out of room for the students. It was remodeled in 2000, 2001, 2007, 2011 and 2013.
- Waukee Northwest High School was built from 2020 to 2021, opening for the 2021-22 school year. It cost $103 million to build, financed by a $117 million bond issued in February 2018. The building is 395,000 square feet. There is a football field, 2 baseball fields, 2 softball fields, 12 tennis courts, a running track and 4 practice fields. Additionally, the city pitched in $7 million adding a playground, fishing pier and 12 baseball and softball fields.

=== Additional facilities ===
- Natatorium is swimming facility that was built for Waukee High and Northwest swimming teams. It was opened on August 5, 2024. The building is 61,000 square feet and the pool can hold up to 1 million gallons. It cost $33 million to build. It can hold around 1,000 spectators.

=== Expansion ===
==== Third High School ====
The district established a second high school in 2021, Waukee Northwest High School. A third high school will likely be added in the 2030s or 40s. In August 2024, a parcel of 110 acres was purchased, for $10 million, on Wendover Lane across south of Fleet Farm. It is estimated that the new high school would cost $235 million to $250 million to build. Parts of Grand Avenue, Mills Civic Parkway and EP True Parkway will be widened and extended to Grand Prairie Parkway by the end of 2026 in preparation for the new high school.

==== 12th Elementary School ====
A 12th elementary school is planned for construction in either 2027 or 2029.

== See also ==
- List of school districts in Iowa
