= Ankeny High School =

Public secondary school in Ankeny, Iowa, United States

Location
- 1155 SW Cherry St; Ankeny, Iowa 50023; United States; 41°43′10″N 93°36′19″W

Information
- Type: General high school
- Established: 1913; 113 years ago
- School district: Ankeny Community School District
- Superintendent: Erick Pruitt
- Principal: Daniel Johnson
- Teaching staff: 80.09 (FTE)
- Grades: 10–12
- Enrollment: 1,346 (2023–2024)
- Student to teacher ratio: 16.81
- Colors: Maroon and gold
- Athletics conference: Central Iowa Metro League
- Team name: Hawks
- Rival: Ankeny Centennial
- Publication: The Talon
- Website: http://ahs.ankenyschools.org/

Ankeny High School is a public high school located in Ankeny, Iowa, United States. It is part of the Ankeny Community School District, and serves grades 10 through 12.

== History ==
AHS opened in 1913 and graduated six seniors in the spring of 1914. In August 2011, the school moved to a new location, which was built at a construction cost of about $54 million. Construction began on the new location in 2008 after planning concluded. Ankeny Centennial High School opened in 2013, drawing students from what was the northern portion of AHS' attendance zone. A new $25 million addition was announced in 2020.

== Athletics ==
AHS athletic teams are classified as 4A by the Iowa High School Athletic Association and compete in the Central Iowa Metro League. In 2005, the girls' basketball team rose as high as No. 2 in USA Today's Super 25 national rankings.

State Championships
Sport	Year(s)
Baseball	1992, 2012
Basketball (boys)	1995, 2020
Basketball (girls)	1978, 1980, 1989, 1997, 1999, 2002, 2003, 2004, 2005
Cross country (boys)	1969
Football	1997, 2012, 2020
Golf (co-ed)	1984, 1998, 1999, 2003, 2004, 2013
Golf (girls)	1986, 2003, 2004, 2008
Soccer (boys)	2007
Soccer (girls)	2011, 2013, 2015, 2019
Softball	1977, 1978, 1979, 1980, 1983, 1984, 1985, 1991, 1994, 1996, 2012
Swimming and diving (boys)	2019
Team mile (boys)	1970, 1973
Tennis (boys)	2003
Track and field (boys, indoor)	1969, 1971
Track and field (boys, outdoor)	1969, 1972, 2024
Track and field (girls, indoor)	1996
Track and field (girls, outdoor)	1981
Volleyball	2004, 2005, 2008, 2009, 2020
Wrestling	1971

== Fine arts ==
Ankeny has four competitive show choirs, "Visual Adrenaline", "Perpetual Motion", "Intensity", now reverted to a treble choir, and, new in the 2027 season, "Velocity", which is a mixed choir. With the opening of Ankeny Centennial in 2013, some inside the show choir program wanted to end the history of the first three groups and start fresh with new directors and new names. The Ankeny Community School District cited a 2009 precedent in a 2011 move to disallow any potential attempted name changes. Visual Adrenaline has won national-level competitions before.

== Notable alumni ==
- Dennis Albaugh, businessman
- Jase Bauer, college football player
- Brody Brecht, baseball player
- Dennis Gibson, football player
- Pat Dunsmore, football player
- Joel Lanning, football coach
- Paul Rhoads, football coach
- Benj Sampson, baseball player
- Todd Sears, baseball player
- Colton Smith, wrestler and martial artist
- Matthew Whitaker, attorney
- Connie Yori, basketball coach

== See also ==
- List of high schools in Iowa
