= Michael Jacobson (athlete) =

American football and basketball player (born 1997)

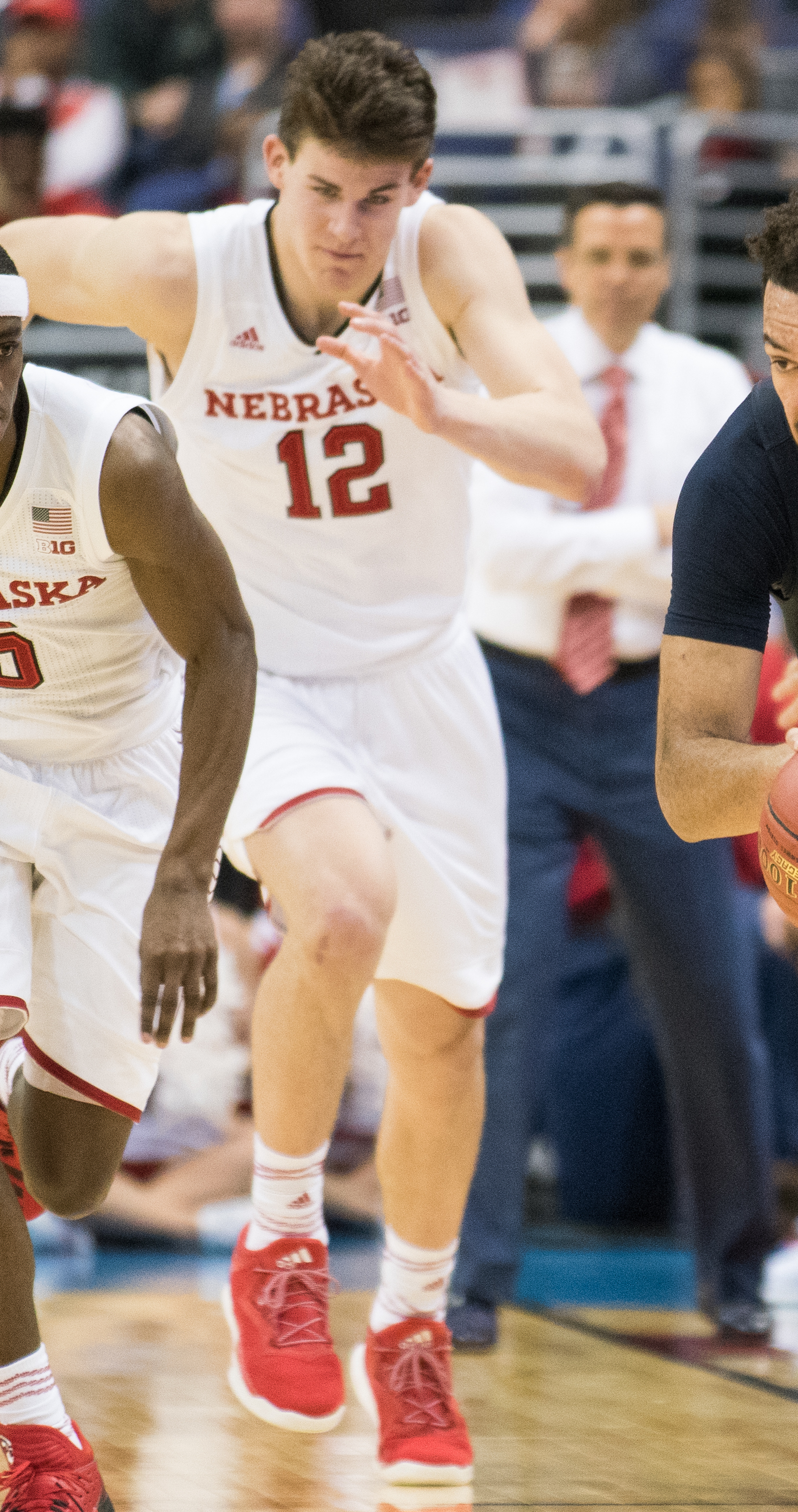
- Jacobson with Nebraska

No. 49, 86
- Position: Tight end

Personal information
- Born: April 4, 1997 (age 29); Waukee, Iowa, U.S.
- Listed height: 6 ft 7 in (2.01 m)
- Listed weight: 244 lb (111 kg)

Career information
- High school: Waukee (Waukee, Iowa)
- College: Nebraska (2015–2017); Iowa State (2018–2020)
- NFL draft: 2020: undrafted

Career history
- Seattle Seahawks (2021)*; Indianapolis Colts (2021–2023)*; New Orleans Saints (2023–2024)*
- * Offseason or practice squad member only
- Stats at Pro Football Reference

Michael Jacobson (born April 4, 1997) is an American former professional football tight end. He played college basketball at Iowa State and Nebraska.

== Early life ==
Jacobson attended Waukee High School. He averaged 17.1 points and 9.7 rebounds per game as a junior and earned second-team all-state recognition. On February 3, 2015, he posted 34 points and 9 rebounds in a 82–57 win against Mason City High School. As a senior, Jacobson averaged 18.6 points, 9.6 rebounds, 2.4 blocks per game, earning First-team All-CIML honors. He committed to Nebraska over offers from Harvard, Lehigh, UTEP, Indiana State and Drake. Jacobson received a scholarship offer to play football at Iowa State, but turned it down to focus on basketball.

== College career ==
As a freshman at Nebraska, Jacobson made 25 starts, averaging 4.7 points and 4.3 rebounds per game on a team that finished 16–18. He started 31 games as a sophomore on a 12–19 team and averaged 6.0 points and 6.2 rebounds per game. Following the season, Jacobson was one of four players to transfer from the team and signed with Iowa State, a school he had grown up supporting. Per NCAA regulations, he sat out a redshirt season, and spent the year practicing against fellow transfer Marial Shayok. In the beginning of his junior season, coach Steve Prohm started Jacobson due to the suspension of Cameron Lard, and continued starting him when Lard returned due to Jacobson's strong play. On November 20, 2018, Jacobson scored a career-high 23 points in an 84–68 win against Illinois. He averaged 11.1 points and 5.9 rebounds per game as a junior, shooting 57.6 percent from the field, and helped the Cyclones reach the NCAA Tournament. Jacobson earned Big 12 Conference All-Tournament team honors after averaging 9.7 points and 9.3 rebounds per game during the tournament, and was also named the 2019 Big 12 Men's Basketball Scholar-Athlete of the Year. As a senior, Jacobson averaged 7.8 points and 5.9 rebounds per game.

== Professional career ==
=== Basketball ===
On August 17, 2020, Jacobson signed his first professional contract with Kyiv-Basket of the Ukrainian Basketball SuperLeague.

=== American football ===
==== Seattle Seahawks ====
On August 6, 2021, Jacobson signed with the Seattle Seahawks of the National Football League. He was waived on August 10, 2021, and re-signed to the practice squad on September 15. He was released on September 25.

==== Indianapolis Colts ====
On October 5, 2021, Jacobson was signed to the Indianapolis Colts practice squad. He signed a reserve/future contract with the Colts on January 10, 2022.

On August 30, 2022, Jacobson was waived by the Colts.

On August 5, 2023, Jacobson re-signed with the Colts. He was waived on August 27, 2023 as part of final roster cuts before the start of the 2023 season.

==== New Orleans Saints ====
On September 13, 2023, Jacobson signed with the New Orleans Saints practice squad. Following the end of the 2023 regular season, the Saints signed him to a reserve/future contract on January 8, 2024.

On August 27, 2024, Jacobson was waived by the Saints and re-signed to the practice squad. He signed a reserve/future contract with New Orleans on January 6, 2025. On August 25, Jacobson was waived by the Saints.

== Personal life ==
Jacobson is the son of Katie and Bill Jacobson. A grandfather played football and baseball at Iowa State. Bill Jacobson played basketball at Omaha in the 1980s and is currently an orthopedic surgeon.
