= Waukee High School =

Public secondary school in Waukee, Iowa, United States

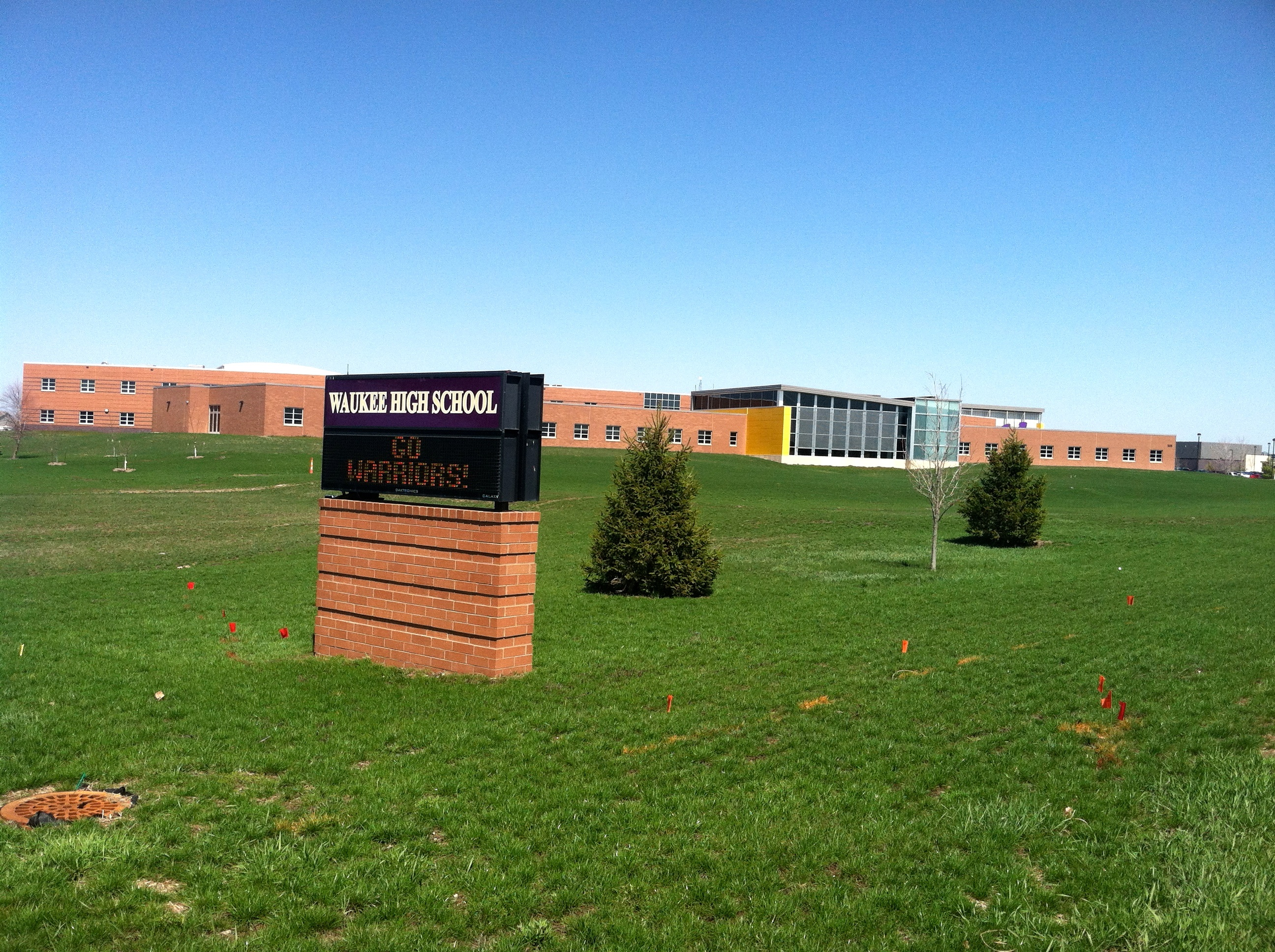

Location
- 555 SE University Avenue; Waukee, IA 50263; 41.6020806°N 93.8637996°W

Information
- Type: Public high school
- Established: c.1997
- School district: Waukee Community Schools
- Superintendent: Andy Crozier
- Principal: Judi Luther-Roland Kevin Atterberg
- Faculty: 112
- Teaching staff: 81.87 (FTE)
- Enrollment: 1,375 (2024–2025)
- Student to teacher ratio: 16.79
- Colors: Purple and gold
- Athletics conference: Central Iowa Metro League
- Nickname: Waukee Warriors
- Rival: Johnston High School; Waukee Northwest High School
- Information: 515-987-5163
- Website: https://www.waukeeschools.org/schools/waukee-high-school/

Waukee High School (also known as Waukee Senior High School) is a three-year public high school in Waukee, Iowa, United States. The school hosts grades 10–12. It is run by the Waukee Community School District.

As of the 2017–18 school year, the school has an enrollment of 1,950 students and 112 faculty, with a 13:1 student-teacher ratio.

== History ==
The high school first opened its doors in 1997. It has renovated and expanded in 2000, 2003, 2005, and 2012. The latest renovation included "an additional 24 classrooms (including three new computer labs, a new media center, and three new science rooms), renovated classrooms, Waukee Fieldhouse, and additional locker rooms." The new fieldhouse has created some controversy because of its considerable cost (nearly $15 million). The gym's large video screen features such amenities as instant replay and player introduction clips.

== Bad Events/Scared ==
On Friday, August 28, 2026, around 7:51 AM, Westcom Dispatch received a report of a possible person with a gun near Waukee High School at 555 SE University Avenue. Because there was limited information, the call was dispatched as an active-threat situation. Waukee Police officers arrived in less than two minutes and began responding to the report. The school went into lockdown while officers investigated. After searching the area, authorities determined there was no active threat at the school. No weapon was found and no injuries were reported. The incident remained under investigation as police worked to determine what led to the original report.

== Enrollment ==
As of the 2018–2019 school year, there were 2,081 students enrolled at Waukee High School. This number has grown exponentially over the years, as Waukee is one of the fastest growing school districts in Iowa.

During the 2010–2011 school year, up to 90% of enrolled students were white. Waukee High School has been slowly becoming more diverse ever since. During the 2018–2019 school year, 81% of enrolled students were white.

== Academics ==
Waukee High School uses a block-scheduling system which has students spending their day in just four classes per day for 90 minutes each. In the average high school class system (eight classes per day), students spend a whole year enrolled in their core classes with semester-long electives. Waukee's block-scheduling keeps students in their core classes for a semester with quarter-long electives. Research has shown that this system creates better attendance rates and more Honor Roll students than traditional class scheduling.

The school has traditionally boasted good grades and test scores. In 2012, the school tested at a 92% proficiency rate for math (state average 83%) and a 94% proficiency rate for reading (state average 84%). The school received the highest possible rating on GreatSchools. The class of 2011 held an ACT composite score average of 23.5 (state average was 22.3).

== Activities ==
=== Vocal music ===
Waukee's premier curricular ensemble, "A Cappella," has been honored with performances at the 2005 and 2015 National, and 2010 and 2021 Regional Conventions of the American Choral Directors Association.

Waukee has three show choirs: Spirit, Millennium and Nova. Under the direction of Matt Huth until 2015, Millennium experienced remarkable success. From 2012 to 2015, they received the award for Best Vocals at every competition in which they performed - a total of 16. Additionally, they were crowned Grand Champion at 13 of the 16 competitions (they were awarded first runner-up at the other three), going entirely undefeated in both 2013 and 2014.

== Athletics ==
Since the 2006–2007 school year, Waukee High School has competed in the CIML (Central Iowa Metro League). In 1997, Waukee was one of the smallest schools in the state, competing at 1A and 2A levels (1A to 5A in order of increasing school size). The school spent several years at the 3A level and has since subsequently risen to 4A and now 5A (the largest class in the state of Iowa). Waukee initially joined the CIML in the Iowa conference; however, since Ankeny has split into two high schools, the league is now moving to a four-conference format for the 2013–2014 seasons.

=== Fall sports ===
- Football
- Volleyball
- Boys' cross-country
- Girls' cross-country
- Boys' golf
  - State champions- 2010, 2012, 2014, 2015, 2018, 2019 . 2020
- Girls' swimming and diving
  - 2011 was the team's inaugural season. Prior to 2011, the team members competed on the combined Johnston-Urbandale-Waukee team; Waukee created its own team after the construction of a new YMCA in Waukee.

=== Winter sports ===
- Boys' basketball
  - 2021 State Champions Class 4A
- Girls' basketball
  - State Champions-2015 and 2021 Class 5A
- Bowling
  - Boys' 2022 Class 3A State Champions
  - Boys' 2026 Class 3A State Champions
- Wrestling
- Boys' swimming
  - 2011 was the team's inaugural season. Prior to 2011 they competed on the combined Johnston-Urbandale-Waukeee team.
  - 5-time State Champions (2016, 2017, 2021, 2022, 2023)

=== Spring sports ===
- Boys' track and field
  - 2014 and 2015 Class 4A State Champions
  - 3-time wheelchair state champions (2018, 2019, 2021)
- Boys' soccer - The 2019 team finished 3rd nationally, according to Top Drawer Soccer, and 8th nationally, according to USA Today/United Soccer Coaches Super 25.
  - 2019 3A State Championship Team
  - 2018 3A State Championship Team
  - 2001 1A State Championship Team
  - 1999 1A State Championship Team
- Girls' soccer
- Boys' tennis
  - 2021 Class 2A State Champions
- Girls' tennis
- Girls' golf
  - 2013 5A State Championship Team
  - 2012 4A State Championship Team
- Girls' lacrosse
  - Their inaugural season was 2010. They generally compete in five tournaments a year, with one at home. The tournaments are located in Omaha, Kansas City, and multiple places in Missouri. The team is associated with the YMCA, which sponsors the tournaments. Combined with some students from Valley High School, this girls' lacrosse Team was the first high-school-age team in Iowa.

=== Summer sports ===
- Baseball
- Softball
  - 2015 5A State Champions
  - 2000 2A State Champions
  - 1999 2A State Champions
- Cheerleading
  - 4A Cheer State titles (2012)
  - Coed Cheer State titles (2015, 2016)
  - 4A Stunt team State titles (2012)
- Dance team
  - Pom State titles (2013, 2012, 2011, 2010, 2009, 2008)
  - Hip Hop State titles (2013, 2012)

== Expansion/growth ==
By itself, the town of Waukee is not very large. Waukee's school district, however, is immense in comparison, encompassing the suburbs as far east as West Des Moines and as far west as the edge of Adel. Because the district extends into West Des Moines, the district has been able to take advantage of enormous residential growth surrounding the Jordan Creek Town Center. This growth has led the district to open a new school each year for six years straight.

Waukee High School has had to expand four times to accommodate the ever-growing student population. In 2018, construction began on a new high school to accommodate the growth of students in the district, and in 2021, Waukee Northwest High School opened its doors.

== Notable alumni ==
- Omaha Biliew (2023), basketball player
- Tucker DeVries (2021), basketball player
- Michael Jacobson (2015), basketball and football player
- Joey Jordison, drummer of Slipknot
- Jake Knott (2009), football player
- Anthony Nelson (2015), football player
- Payton Sandfort (2021), basketball player
- Pryce Sandfort (2023), basketball player

== See also ==
- List of high schools in Iowa
