= Riley Moss =

American football player (born 2000)

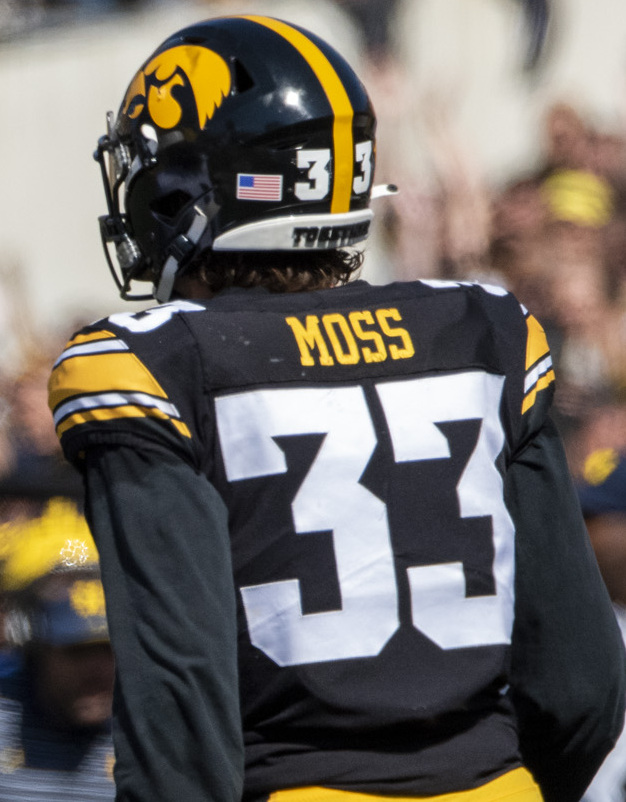
- Moss with the Iowa Hawkeyes in 2022

No. 21 – Denver Broncos
- Position: Cornerback
- Roster status: Active

Personal information
- Born: March 3, 2000 (age 26); Ankeny, Iowa, U.S.
- Listed height: 6 ft 0 in (1.83 m)
- Listed weight: 193 lb (88 kg)

Career information
- High school: Centennial (Ankeny)
- College: Iowa (2018–2022)
- NFL draft: 2023: 3rd round, 83rd overall pick

Career history
- Denver Broncos (2023–present)

Awards and highlights
- 2× First-team All-Big Ten (2021, 2022); Big Ten Defensive Back of the Year (2021)

Career NFL statistics as of Week 2, 2026
- Total tackles: 180
- Forced fumbles: 1
- Fumble recoveries: 1
- Pass deflections: 31
- Interceptions: 3
- Sacks: 1.0
- Stats at Pro Football Reference

Riley Moss (born March 3, 2000) is an American professional football cornerback for the Denver Broncos of the National Football League (NFL). He played college football for the Iowa Hawkeyes, and was a two-time All-Big Ten selection. Moss was selected by the Broncos in the third round of the 2023 NFL draft.

== Early life ==
Moss grew up in Ankeny, Iowa, and attended Ankeny Centennial High School, where he played football and ran track. He originally committed to play college football at North Dakota State entering his senior season. As a senior, Moss caught six passes for 167 and a touchdown on offense and had 29 tackles and an interception on defense. Moss decommitted from North Dakota State and committed to play at Iowa after receiving a late offer.

== College career ==
Moss joined the Iowa Hawkeyes as a blue-shirt recruit and was awarded a scholarship after the end of his freshman season. He was named the Big Ten Conference freshman of the week after intercepting two passes against Minnesota. As a junior, Moss had 43 tackles with four passes broken up and two interceptions, one of which he returned for a touchdown, and was an honorable mention All-Big Ten selection. He returned two interceptions for touchdowns against Indiana in the first game of his senior season. Moss missed three games after suffering a torn posterior cruciate ligament in Iowa's 23-20 win over fourth-ranked Penn State.

== Professional career ==
Pre-draft measurables
Height	Weight	Arm length	Hand span	Wingspan	40-yard dash	10-yard split	20-yard split	20-yard shuttle	Three-cone drill	Vertical jump	Broad jump	Bench press
6 ft 0 5/8 in (1.84 m)	193 lb (88 kg)	30 in (0.76 m)	9 1/2 in (0.24 m)	6 ft 2 1/8 in (1.88 m)	4.45 s	1.48 s	2.56 s	4.15 s	6.60 s	39.0 in (0.99 m)	10 ft 7 in (3.23 m)	11 reps
All values from NFL Combine/Pro Day

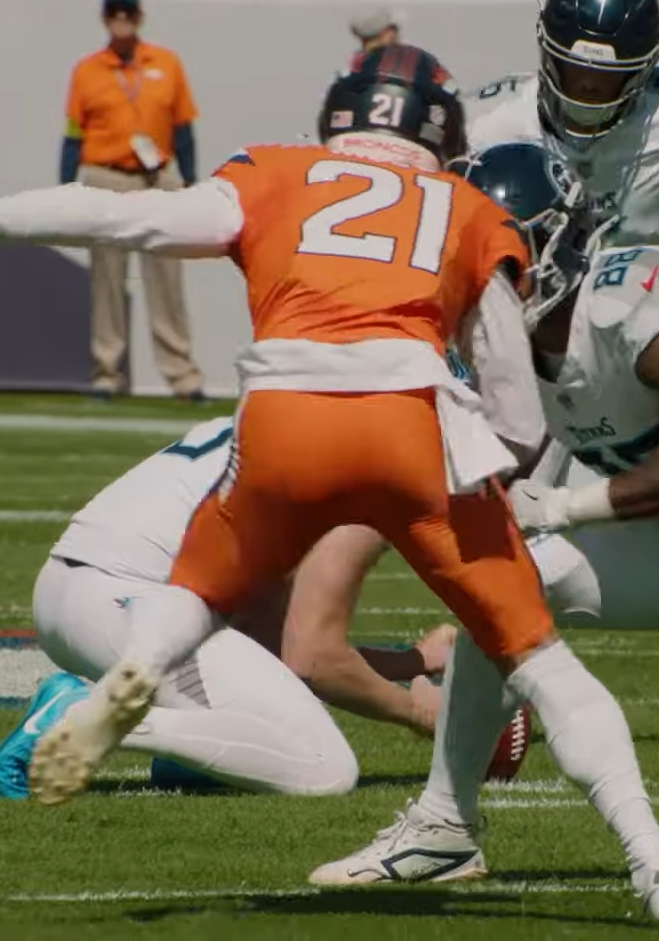
Moss with the Denver Broncos in 2025

Moss was selected by the Denver Broncos in the third round, 83rd overall, of the 2023 NFL draft. As a rookie, he appeared in 14 games.

Prior to the 2024 season, Moss was named the Broncos' second starting cornerback opposite Patrick Surtain II. He started his first game in Week 1 against the Seattle Seahawks, becoming only the second white player to start at the cornerback position since Jason Sehorn in 2002.

In the fourth quarter of the Broncos' Week 3 game against the Tampa Bay Buccaneers, Moss forced a fumble off tight end Cade Otton, which safety Brandon Jones recovered and returned for 34 yards.

In Week 5 against the Las Vegas Raiders of the 2024 season, Moss recorded his first career interception off a pass from Gardner Minshew, becoming the first white cornerback to record an interception since Sehorn in 2002.

In Week 15 against the Green Bay Packers of the 2025 season, Moss intercepted a tipped pass thrown by Jordan Love to intended target Dontayvion Wicks, recording his second career interception.

In Week 2 of the 2026 season against the Jacksonville Jaguars, Moss intercepted Trevor Lawrence while the Broncos were down 6–13. The Broncos would go on to score 14 straight points unanswered, winning the game 20–13.

On November 19, 2026, Moss signed a four-year, $67 million contract extension with the Broncos keeping him with the team through 2030.

== NFL career statistics ==
Legend
	Led the league
**Bold**	Career high

=== Regular season ===
Year	Team	Games		Tackles						Interceptions						Fumbles			
Year	Team	GP	GS	Comb	Solo	Ast	Sck	TFL	Sfty	PD	Int	Yds	Avg	Lng	TD	FF	FR	Yds	TD
2023	DEN	14	0	6	2	4	0.0	0	0	0	0	0	0.0	0	0	0	0	0	0
2024	DEN	14	14	**86**	**65**	21	0.0	1	0	8	**1**	0	0.0	0	0	**1**	**1**	0	0
2025	DEN	17	17	80	57	**23**	**1.0**	**3**	0	**19**	**1**	0	0.0	0	0	0	0	0	0
Career		45	31	172	124	48	1.0	4	0	27	2	0	0.0	0	0	1	1	0	0

=== Postseason ===
Year	Team	Games		Tackles						Interceptions						Fumbles			
Year	Team	GP	GS	Comb	Solo	Ast	Sck	TFL	Sfty	PD	Int	Yds	Avg	Lng	TD	FF	FR	Yds	TD
2024	DEN	1	1	**7**	**5**	**2**	0.0	0	0	**1**	0	0	0	0	0	0	0	0	0
2025	DEN	2	2	6	**5**	1	0.0	0	0	0	0	0	0	0	0	0	0	0	0
Career		3	3	13	10	3	0.0	0	0	1	0	0	0	0	0	0	0	0	0
