= Anthony Nelson (American football) =

American football player (born 1997)

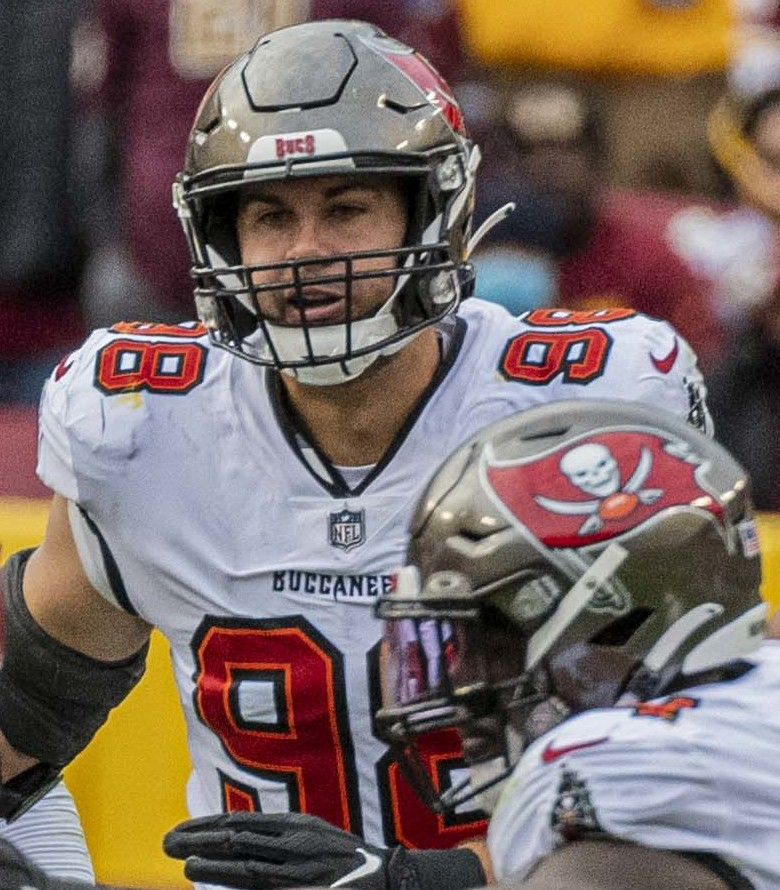
- Nelson with the Tampa Bay Buccaneers in 2021

No. 98 – Tampa Bay Buccaneers
- Position: Outside linebacker
- Roster status: Active

Personal information
- Born: March 4, 1997 (age 29); Urbandale, Iowa, U.S.
- Listed height: 6 ft 7 in (2.01 m)
- Listed weight: 271 lb (123 kg)

Career information
- High school: Waukee (Waukee, Iowa)
- College: Iowa (2015–2018)
- NFL draft: 2019: 4th round, 107th overall pick

Career history
- Tampa Bay Buccaneers (2019–present)

Awards and highlights
- Super Bowl champion (LV); Second-team All-Big Ten (2018); Third-team All-Big Ten (2017)

Career NFL statistics as of 2025
- Total tackles: 212
- Sacks: 21.5
- Forced fumbles: 7
- Fumble recoveries: 3
- Pass deflections: 7
- Interceptions: 1
- Defensive touchdowns: 1
- Stats at Pro Football Reference

Anthony Robert Nelson (born March 4, 1997) is an American professional football outside linebacker for the Tampa Bay Buccaneers of the National Football League (NFL). He played college football for the Iowa Hawkeyes, and was selected by the Buccaneers in the fourth round of the 2019 NFL draft.

== Early life ==
Anthony Nelson was born on March 4, 1997, in Urbandale, Iowa. He attended Waukee High School in Waukee, Iowa.

== College career ==
Nelson signed with the University of Iowa on February 4, 2015. He redshirted during the Hawkeyes historic 2015 season.

As a redshirt freshman at Iowa, Nelson played in all 13 games with one start. He earned Big Ten Freshman of the Week honors after collecting 2.5 sacks in a win over Miami (OH) – his first game as a Hawkeye – and finished the season second on the team in sacks and tackles for loss. Nelson's first career start came in a 42–3 win over in-state rival Iowa State.

During his sophomore season, Nelson started all 13 games and led the team with 7.5 sacks. He also had four pass break-ups, two forced fumbles and a blocked field goal. After the season, Nelson was named third-team All-Big Ten by the media and honorable mention by league coaches. He made several key plays, including two sacks and a forced fumble, to help the Hawkeyes win the 2017 Pinstripe Bowl.

Nelson again started all 13 games as a junior, establishing career bests for sacks (9.5) and tackles for loss (13.5). He was Big Ten Defensive Player of the Week after wins over Minnesota and Nebraska, and recovered a fumble for a touchdown in a shutout win over Maryland. After the season, Nelson was named second-team All-Big Ten by media and third-team by coaches.

Despite having one year of eligibility remaining, Nelson declared for the NFL Draft after his junior season at Iowa. He and former Hawkeye teammate A. J. Epenesa are the only players in school history to finish their careers on the school's top ten sacks list while only playing three years at Iowa.

== Professional career ==
Pre-draft measurables
Height	Weight	Arm length	Hand span	Wingspan	40-yard dash	10-yard split	20-yard split	20-yard shuttle	Three-cone drill	Vertical jump	Broad jump	Bench press
6 ft 7 in (2.01 m)	271 lb (123 kg)	34 7/8 in (0.89 m)	9 7/8 in (0.25 m)	6 ft 11 in (2.11 m)	4.82 s	1.65 s	2.76 s	4.23 s	6.95 s	35.5 in (0.90 m)	9 ft 10 in (3.00 m)	18 reps
All values from NFL Combine

Nelson was selected by the Tampa Bay Buccaneers in the fourth round, 107th overall, of the 2019 NFL draft.

In Week 16 of the 2020 season against the Detroit Lions, Nelson recorded his first career sack on David Blough during the 47–7 win. Nelson was a part of the Super Bowl LV champion Buccaneers. He recorded four solo tackles across the postseason, including one in the Super Bowl.

On March 16, 2023, Nelson signed a two-year contract extension with the Buccaneers.

On March 11, 2025, Nelson re-signed with Tampa Bay on a two-year, $10 million contract. In Week 8, Nelson intercepted a pass from Spencer Rattler and returned it for a three-yard touchdown. He also recorded two sacks and a forced fumble in the 23-3 win over the New Orleans Saints, earning NFC Defensive Player of the Week.

== Career statistics ==
=== NFL ===
Legend
**Bold**	Career high

==== Regular season ====
Year	Team	Games		Tackles							Interceptions						Fumbles				
Year	Team	GP	GS	Cmb	Solo	Ast	TFL	QBH	Sck	Sfty	PD	Int	Yds	Y/I	Lng	TD	FF	FR	Yds	Y/R	TD
2019	TB	9	1	8	1	7	0	0	0.0	0	1	0	0	—	0	0	1	0	0	—	0
2020	TB	16	1	18	11	7	2	7	1.0	0	1	0	0	—	0	0	0	0	0	—	0
2021	TB	**17**	2	22	13	9	**7**	10	5.0	0	1	0	0	—	0	0	0	**1**	0	0.0	0
2022	TB	**17**	**8**	**46**	**26**	**20**	4	6	**5.5**	0	0	0	0	—	0	0	**3**	**1**	0	0.0	0
2023	TB	16	0	40	21	19	**7**	6	3.0	0	1	0	0	—	0	0	0	0	0	—	0
2024	TB	**17**	6	40	25	15	6	**13**	4.0	0	1	0	0	—	0	0	1	**1**	0	0.0	0
2025	TB	11	4	32	18	14	3	4	3.0	0	**1**	**1**	**3**	**3.0**	**3**	**1**	2	0	0	—	0
Career		103	22	206	115	91	29	46	21.5	0	6	1	3	3.0	3	1	7	3	0	0.0	0

==== Postseason ====
Year	Team	Games		Tackles							Interceptions						Fumbles				
Year	Team	GP	GS	Cmb	Solo	Ast	TFL	QBH	Sck	Sfty	PD	Int	Yds	Y/I	Lng	TD	FF	FR	Yds	Y/R	TD
2020	TB	**4**	0	4	**4**	0	**1**	**2**	**1.0**	0	0	0	0	—	0	0	0	0	0	—	0
2021	TB	2	0	2	1	1	0	**2**	0.0	0	0	0	0	—	0	0	0	0	0	—	0
2022	TB	1	**1**	3	3	0	0	0	0.0	0	0	0	0	—	0	0	0	0	0	—	0
2023	TB	2	0	1	1	0	0	1	0.0	0	0	0	0	—	0	0	0	0	0	—	0
2024	TB	1	**1**	**5**	1	**4**	0	0	0.0	0	0	0	0	—	0	0	0	0	0	—	0
Career		10	2	15	10	5	1	5	1.0	0	0	0	0	—	0	0	0	0	0	—	0

=== College ===
Legend
**Bold**	Career high

Year	Team	Games		Tackles				Sacks		Fumbles	
Year	Team	GP	GS	Solo	Ast	Total	TFL	Total	Yards	FF	FR
2015	Iowa	Redshirt									
2016	Iowa	13	1	15	18	33	8.0	6.0	39	**2**	0
2017	Iowa	13	13	21	20	41	9.5	7.5		**2**	0
2018	Iowa	13	13	**23**	**22**	**45**	**13.5**	**9.5**	**63**	0	**1**
Totals		39	27	59	60	119	31.0	23.0		4	1
