= Brody Brecht =

American baseball player (born 2002)

Colorado Rockies
- Pitcher
- Born: September 27, 2002 (age 23); Ankeny, Iowa, U.S.
- Bats: Right Throws: Right
- Stats at Baseball Reference

Brody Brecht (born September 27, 2002) is an American professional baseball pitcher in the Colorado Rockies organization. He was drafted by the Rockies with the 38th selection in the 2024 MLB draft.

== Amateur career ==
Brecht grew up in Ankeny, Iowa, and attended Ankeny High School, where he played baseball and football and also ran track. He caught 35 passes for 796 yards and seven touchdowns during his junior season. Brecht had 42 receptions for 599 yards and 12 touchdowns as a senior. He was also named the Iowa Gatorade Player of the Year in baseball after going 10–0 with a 0.57 ERA with 126 strikeouts. Brecht committed to play both baseball and football at the University of Iowa. He was considered a late-rising prospect in the 2021 Major League Baseball draft, but ultimately went unselected due to his strong commitment to play football at Iowa.

Brecht redshirted his true freshman football season with the Iowa Hawkeyes. In baseball, he made 17 pitching appearances with one start and went 1–3 with a 3.18 ERA and 44 strikeouts. After his freshman year, Brecht played collegiate summer baseball for the Clinton LumberKings of the Prospect League. He played in nine games during his redshirt freshman football season with five starts, catching nine passes for 87 yards. Shortly before the start of Iowa's spring football practices, Brecht announced he would be giving up football to focus solely on baseball.

In 2023, he played collegiate summer baseball with the Chatham Anglers of the Cape Cod Baseball League.

== Professional career ==
The Colorado Rockies selected Brecht with the 38th overall pick in the 2024 Major League Baseball draft. Brecht is the highest-drafted Iowa Hawkeye since the selection of Tim Costo in 1990. On July 21, 2024, he signed with Colorado on a $2.7 million contract.
