= Talia Leman =

American nonprofit organization executive

Talia Leman is the CEO and a founder of RandomKid, an organization that empowers young people to do good deeds by providing structure, staff and a tax exempt umbrella organization to receive and disperse funds.

At the age of 10, as a student in Waukee, Iowa, and concerned about the effects of Hurricane Katrina, Leman organized children across the country to raise money and support for those affected. Her efforts resulted in more than $10 million being pledged by children across the country. RandomKid was the winner of a 2008 World of Children award, as well as the 2010 United Nations Alliance of Civilizations Intercultural Innovations Award.

Leman has been honored by the US Congress via a tribute by Congressman Tom Latham. Leman has published a book, A Random Book about the Power of ANYone.

== Awards ==
- Nestle Very Best in Youth, 2009 Award
- World of Children's Founder’s Youth Award, 2008
- National Jefferson Award
- Diller Teen Tikun Olam Award 2013
- Daily Point of Light Award 2006
