= Jake Knott =

American football player (born 1990)

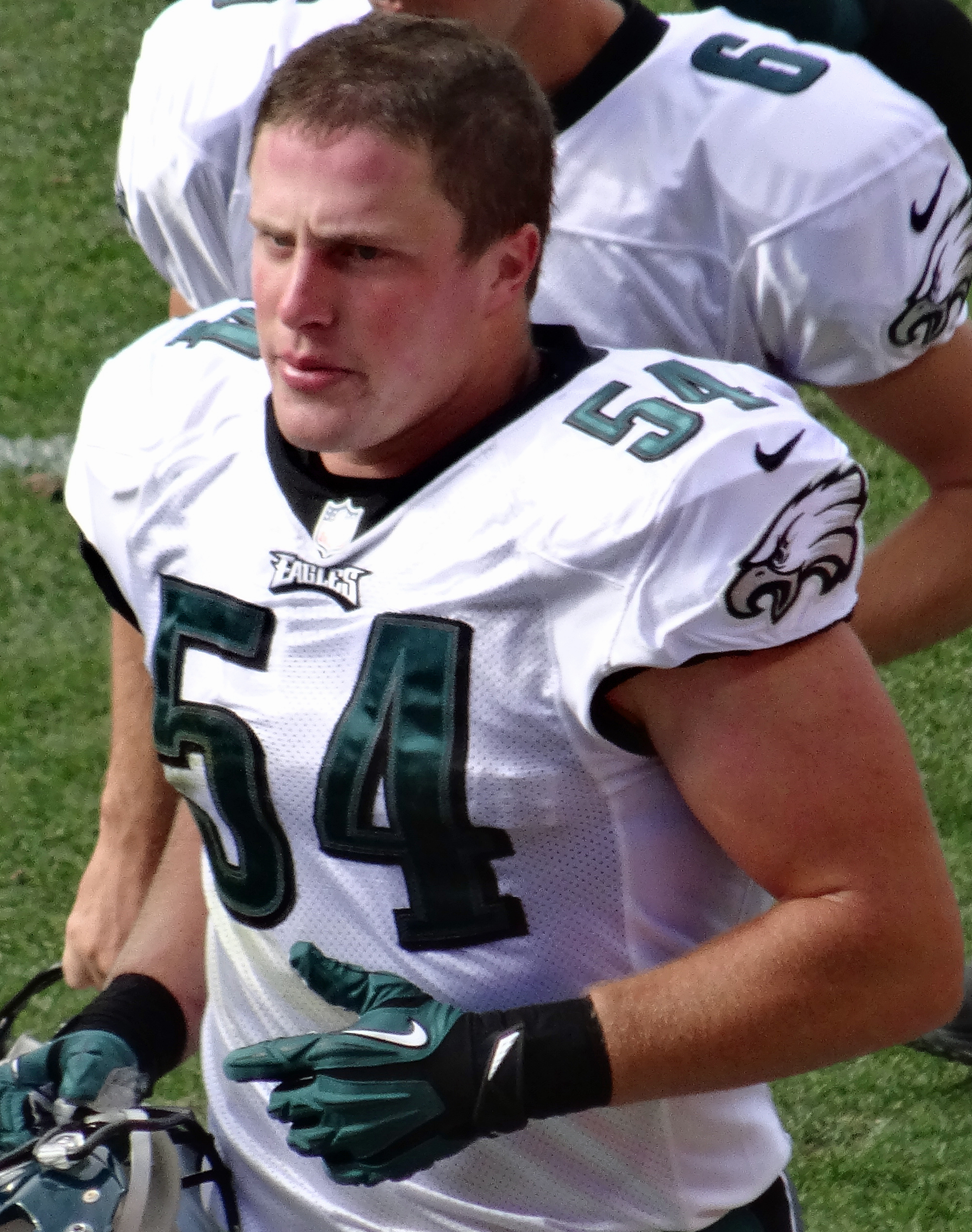
- Knott with the Philadelphia Eagles in 2013

No. 45, 54
- Position: Linebacker

Personal information
- Born: October 24, 1990 (age 36); Kansas City, Missouri, U.S.
- Listed height: 6 ft 3 in (1.91 m)
- Listed weight: 239 lb (108 kg)

Career information
- High school: Waukee (Waukee, Iowa)
- College: Iowa State (2009–2012)
- NFL draft: 2013: undrafted

Career history
- Philadelphia Eagles (2013–2014); Miami Dolphins (2014)

Awards and highlights
- 2× First-team All-Big 12 (2011, 2012); Second-team All-Big 12 (2010)

Career NFL statistics
- Total tackles: 8
- Stats at Pro Football Reference

Jake Knott (born October 24, 1990) is an American former professional football player who was a linebacker in the National Football League (NFL). He played college football for the Iowa State Cyclones and was signed by the Philadelphia Eagles as an undrafted free agent in 2013.

== High school ==
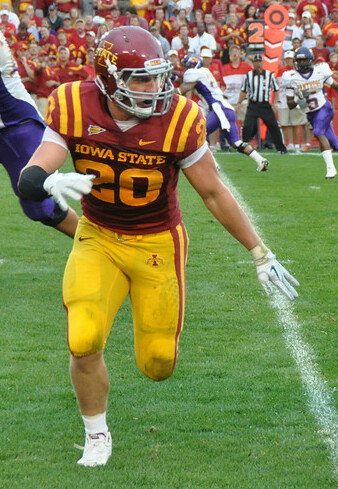
Knott (20) with Iowa State in 2011

Knott attended Waukee High School in Waukee, IA where he was a three-sport athlete (Football, Track, Baseball), earning all-state honors in each sport. Knott was being recruited for both football and baseball and was listed on Rivals as a two star outside linebacker as well as the 9th best recruit in the state of Iowa. After receiving offers from numerous smaller schools, he was offered a scholarship from Iowa State. He was reportedly the first commitment under first year coach, Paul Rhoads in 2009.

== Professional career ==
=== Philadelphia Eagles ===
On April 27, 2013, Knott signed with the Philadelphia Eagles after going unselected in the 2013 NFL draft. Knott recorded a tackle and recovered an onside kick in his first NFL game.

It was announced on April 4, 2014, that he would be suspended for the first four games of the 2014 season for testing positive for performance-enhancing drugs. He was released on August 23, 2014.

Knott was re-signed to the Eagles practice squad on October 1, 2014, but was waived with an injury settlement on October 3, 2014.

=== Miami Dolphins ===
On December 9, 2014, he was signed by the Miami Dolphins, but was waived on June 5, 2015.
