= Gene Lalley =

American basketball player (1922–1972)

Personal information
- Born: August 12, 1922 Des Moines, Iowa
- Died: December 20, 1972 (aged 50) Los Angeles, California
- Listed height: 5 ft 9 in (1.75 m)
- Listed weight: 160 lb (73 kg)

Career information
- High school: Dowling Catholic (West Des Moines, Iowa)
- College: Creighton (1942–1943, 1946–1948)
- Position: Guard

Career history
- 1948–1949: Denver Nuggets

Eugene Claire Lalley (August 12, 1922 – December 20, 1972) was an American professional basketball player. He played for the Denver Nuggets in the National Basketball League during their 1948–49 season and averaged 3.0 points per game.
