= Ankeny Centennial High School =

Public secondary school in Ankeny, Iowa, United States

Location
- 2220 NW State Street; Ankeny, Iowa, Iowa 50023; United States
- 41.7497°N 93.6229°W

Information
- Type: Public secondary
- Established: 2013
- School district: Ankeny Community School District
- Principal: Jeffry Grassmeyer
- Teaching staff: 89.20 (FTE)
- Grades: 10–12
- Enrollment: 1,466 (2023-2024)
- Student to teacher ratio: 16.43
- Colors: Black and silver
- Athletics conference: Central Iowa Metro League
- Nickname: Jaguars
- Rival: Ankeny High School
- Accreditation: AdvancED, State of Iowa
- Website: achs.ankenyschools.org

Ankeny Centennial High School (ACHS) is a public high school in Ankeny, Iowa, United States, serving grades 10 through 12. It is one of two high schools in the Ankeny Community School District.

== History ==
Ankeny Centennial opened in 2013, covering the northern part of the school district. ACHS relieved Ankeny High School of overcrowding as the district's second high school; both schools had approximately 990 students in the 2013–14 school year. This was the first time in 40 years that an Iowa school district had its number of high schools increase from one to two. Ankeny Centennial is structurally identical to the 2011 rebuild of Ankeny High School.

== Athletics ==
The Jaguars are members of the Central Iowa Metro League.

State Championships
Sport	Year(s)
Basketball (girls)	2016
Golf (boys)	2014
Soccer (girls)	2016, 2018, 2022
Softball	2023
Volleyball	2014, 2015, 2016, 2018

== Performing arts ==
ACHS has four competitive show choirs: the mixed-gender "Spectrum", "Eternal Rush", and "Chaos" and the all-female "Vortex". The program hosts an annual competition, the Mid-Iowa Show Choir Championships. Spectrum finished second at a national invite in 2016 and was undefeated in its 2020 season, capturing vocal and choreography awards at every competition.

ACHS also has a competitive marching band that performs and competes throughout Iowa. It was twice selected to perform in the New York City Veterans Day Parade. The band program features a Wind Symphony, a Symphonic Band, a 9th Grade Concert Band, and four jazz bands: Jazz Collective, Jazz Studio, Jazz Vanguard, and Jazz Lab.

== Notable alumni ==
- Riley Moss, NFL player
- Justin Phongsavanh, American Paralympic athlete

== See also ==
- List of high schools in Iowa
