= Dowling Catholic High School =

Private secondary school in West Des Moines, Iowa, United States

Location
- 1400 Buffalo Road; West Des Moines, Iowa 50265; United States; 41°35′49″N 93°43′23″W

Information
- Type: Private, Coeducational
- Motto: Veritas ∙ Fides ∙ Sapientia (Truth ∙ Faith ∙ Wisdom)
- Religious affiliation: Catholic
- Established: 1884
- Oversight: Diocese of Des Moines
- President: Dan Ryan
- Principal: Matt Meendering
- Faculty: 94.6 (on an FTE basis)
- Grades: 9–12
- Enrollment: 1,431 (2013-14)
- Student to teacher ratio: 15.1
- Colors: Maroon and White
- Athletics conference: Central Iowa Metro League
- Nickname: Maroons
- Rivals: Valley High School
- Website: www.dowlingcatholic.org

Dowling Catholic High School is a Catholic secondary school in West Des Moines, Iowa, within the Diocese of Des Moines.

As of the 2013–14 school year, the school had an enrollment of 1,431 students and 94.6 classroom teachers (on an FTE basis), for a student–teacher ratio of 15.1:1. The school's enrollment was 81.2% White, 4.1% Black, 10.2% Hispanic, 4.4% Asian and 0.1% American Indian / Alaska Native.

== History ==
It was created in 1972 by the merger of St. Joseph Academy for girls (established in 1884) and Dowling High School for boys (established in 1918 as the Des Moines College boarding school for boys). It was named after Austin Dowling, first bishop of the Diocese of Des Moines and second archbishop of the Archdiocese of St. Paul.

== Controversies ==
=== Sexual exploitation ===
A former teacher plead guilty to sexual exploitation of a student on school grounds.

=== Hiring and LGBTQ+ policies ===
Protests and student walkouts occurred after employment decisions tied to a candidate's sexual orientation did not align with diocesan teachings, drawing regional criticism and debate over inclusion. Student-led pushes for LGBTQ+ visibility and transgender rights sparked internal tension and prompted the Diocese of Des Moines to publicly re-emphasize traditional Catholic teachings on gender identity.

== Academics ==
During the 2003–04 school year, Dowling Catholic High School was recognized with the Blue Ribbon School Award of Excellence by the United States Department of Education, the highest award an American school can receive.

== Tuition ==
Total tuition cost for 2018-2019 is $11,176 plus fees. Tuition for students belonging to a Catholic Parish is $7,986 plus fees. Tuition for international students is $12,076 plus fees.

== Extracurricular activities ==
=== Baseball ===
The Maroons hold the record for most team home runs during a championship game with 5 in 2001.

Baseball State Championships
Year	Record	Opponent	Score
1988	39–2	Ames	9–8
1989	38–5	Fort Dodge	8–5
1999	33–13	Ankeny	6–1
2001	42–3	Marshaltown	13–2
2011	36-7	Mason City	6-1

=== Boys' basketball ===
State Boys' Basketball Championships
Year	Score	Opponent
1957	69–66	Waterloo, West
1979	60–57	Davenport Central

Bobby Hansen who later played at the University of Iowa and nine years in the NBA, was on the 1979 state championship team.

=== Cross country ===
==== Girls ====
State Cross Country Team Championships
Year	Finishes	Score
2007	1-2-6-8-15	32
2008	1-2-9-24-33	69
2009	1-2-11-15-28	57
2010	3-4-14-19-20	60
2011	1-6-14-20-22	63

- 2007 Girls' Heartland Regional Champions

==== Boys ====
State Cross Country Team Championship Wins
Year	Finishes	Score
1974	4-9-10-16	39
1985	3-8-15-36	62
2011	3-6-12-18-31	70
2012	1-6-8-18-27	60
2015	1-9-13-17-29	69
2016	3-8-13-23-53	100
2018	4-7-15-17-29	72
2019	2-14-16-17-38	87
2021	1-7-9-18-21	58
2022	1-5-9-13-23	51
2023	3-10-18-19-22	72

=== Debate ===
Dowling is the home of the Dowling Catholic Paradigm, one of the largest debate tournaments held by a school. In 2015, Dowling Catholic won 2 state titles for Congressional Debate, 1 for Public Forum debate, and 1 for Lincoln Douglas Debate.

=== Football ===
Home games are played at the 9,500 seat Valley Stadium in West Des Moines, Williams Stadium, or at Drake Stadium in Des Moines. In 2019, they became the first school in Iowa history to win seven straight Class 4A state championships.

Dowling made the playoffs 17 years in a row beginning in 1985 and ending in 2002 when Dowling missed the playoffs. The school won 36 consecutive games in the 1967 through 1971 graduating class seasons. Dowling won 64 consecutive Metro conference games, a streak lasting from 1968 to 1977. In addition to the 64 metro games Dowling also won 57 consecutive conference games lasting from 1993 to 2002. WDM, Valley is Dowling's primary rival since 1968 when the schools joined the Des Moines Metro Conference.

State Football Championships
2000 (13–0)	35–28	Bettendorf High (11–2)
2001 (13–0)	35–15	Iowa City High (12–1)
2010 (14–0)	38-31(OT)	Iowa City High (13–1)
2013 (14–0)	44–13	Cedar Rapids Xavier (12–2)
2014 (13–1)	49–14	Washington High School (13–1)
2015 (13–0)	41–10	C. R. Kennedy (13–1)
2016 (12–1)	23–10	Iowa City West (10–3)
2017 (12–1)	35–21	Iowa City West (12–1)
2018 (11–2)	22–16	Cedar Falls (12–1)
2019 (12–1)	21–16	West Des Moines Valley (12–1)
2025 (12–1)	27-10	Iowa City Liberty (11-2)

=== Swimming ===
The boys' swimming team won four championships, consecutively from 2001 to 2003.

The girls' swim team won their first state title during the 2019 season and second and third in 2024 and 2025

=== Boys' tennis ===
Boys-2A State of Iowa High School Tennis Championships
Year	Team Titles/Player Titles	Opponent	Score
1992	2A-Team Title	Cedar Rapids Kennedy High School	5–3
2001	2A-Team Title	Dubuque Senior High School	5–3

=== Wrestling ===
- Dowling has won State Dual Wrestling Championships in 1987, 1988, 1989, 1990, 1991, and 1992
- Dowling has won the State Traditional Wrestling Championship in 1975, 1978, 1984, 1988, 1990, and 1991

State Wrestling Team Championships
Year	Score
1975	46.5
1978	94.5
1984	115
1988	124.5
1990	109.5
1991	91

- Dowling has the state record for most consecutive dual wins with 136 set from January 1986 to January 1992

== Notable alumni ==
- Gene Lalley (1940), NBA player
- Jerry Groom (1947), NFL Pro Bowl offensive lineman
- Fred L. Turner (1951), former CEO of McDonald's
- Chuck Muelhaupt (1953), NFL offensive lineman
- Bob Harlan (1954), former president of the Green Bay Packers
- George Kinley (1955), Iowa state legislator
- Tom Harkin (1957), United States Senator (Iowa)
- Tony Bisignano (1970), member of the Iowa Senate
- Bobby Hansen (1979), NBA player
- Claire Celsi (1984), Iowa State Senator
- Matt McCoy (1984), Iowa State Senator
- Scott Pose (1985), MLB outfielder
- Chris Broussard (1986 - transferred), sports analyst for FS1
- Shawn Crahan (1987), Slipknot percussionist
- Mike Mahoney (1990), MLB catcher
- Ross Verba (1991), NFL offensive lineman
- Jennie Baranczyk (2000), head women's basketball coach for the Oklahoma Sooners
- Tyson Smith (2000), NFL linebacker
- Matt Macri (2001), MLB third baseman
- Karen Maine (2003), director and screenwriter of Yes, God, Yes
- Michael Annett (2004), NASCAR driver
- Clare Duwelius (2007), Executive Vice President of Unrivaled, former WNBA GM
- Miranda Leek (2011), Olympic archer
- Amara Darboh (2012), NFL wide receiver
- Matt Haack (2013), NFL punter
- Rico Gafford (2014), NFL wide receiver
- Karissa Schweizer (2014), track and field athlete, Olympian and World Record holder in the 4x1500 meters relay
- Jake Hummel (2017), linebacker for the Baltimore Ravens
- Carter Baumler (2020), pitcher in the Baltimore Orioles organization
- Caitlin Clark (2020), WNBA All-Star player for the Indiana Fever
- Omaha Biliew (2023 - transferred), basketball player for the Wake Forest Demon Deacons
- Teagan Kavan (2023), softball pitcher for the Texas Longhorns
