= Central Iowa Metro League =

High school athletic conference in Iowa

- Conference: IHSAA / IGHSAU
- Founded: 1991
- Sports fielded: 21
- No. of teams: 9
- Region: Des Moines Metro
- Official website: https://www.cimlcentral.org/

The Central Iowa Metro League (also called CIML) is a high school athletic conference whose members are located in the suburban cities of Des Moines, Iowa.

The conference includes 9 schools, all of which compete at the 5A classification level, which is for the largest schools.

== Member schools ==
There are currently 9 members of the Central Iowa Metro League (CIML):

Institution	Location	Affiliation	2026-2027 BEDS	Mascot	Colors
Ankeny	Ankeny	Public	1,367	Hawks/Hawkettes	
Centennial	Ankeny	Public	1,531	Jaguars	
Dowling Catholic	West Des Moines	Private	1,099	Maroons	
Johnston	Johnston	Public	1,761	Dragons	
Northwest	Waukee	Public	1,668	Wolves	
Southeast Polk	Pleasant Hill	Public	1,691	Rams	
Urbandale	Urbandale	Public	924	J-Hawks	
Valley	West Des Moines	Public	2,131	Tigers	
Waukee	Waukee	Public	1,475	Warriors	

Shared Sports and Cooperatives
School	Sport	Cooperative Schools
Ankeny	Football, Boys Soccer, Boys Tennis, Boys Wrestling, Girls Soccer, Girls Tennis	Ankeny Christian Academy
Ankeny	Girls Wrestling	Bondurant-Farrar
Johnston	Boys Tennis	Dallas Center-Grimes
Johnston	Girls Soccer, Girls Tennis	Woodward-Granger
Urbandale	Boys Tennis, Boys Wrestling, Girls Tennis	Des Moines Christian
Urbandale	Girls Wrestling	Dowling Catholic
Waukee	Boys Tennis	ADM, Van Meter
Waukee	Girls Tennis	ADM

== History ==
Since its founding, the Central Iowa Metro League was a league composed of metropolitan schools in central Iowa. The conference, for many years, consisted of just 14 schools: the 5 Des Moines schools, Ankeny, Ames, Valley, Dowling, Indianola, Marshalltown, Southeast Polk, Newton and Urbandale. In 1992, Mason City and Fort Dodge joined the conference, leaving the Big Eight, which had recently been decimated by other conference realignments. With these two new additions the conference split into two divisions. Ottumwa and Johnston joined the conference later in the 1990s to make the CIML an 18 team conference, splitting the conference into a three division format. For the 2006–07 athletics season, Waukee joined the conference, replacing Newton, who joined the Little Hawkeye Conference.

The three division format comprised the Central, Iowa, and Metro Conferences, organized like this:

Central	Iowa	Metro
Ankeny	Mason City	Des Moines East
Indianola	Ames	Des Moines Hoover
Dowling Catholic	Marshalltown	Des Moines Lincoln
Johnston	Fort Dodge	Des Moines North
Southeast Polk	Waukee	Des Moines Roosevelt
Urbandale	Valley	Ottumwa

In the fall of 2013, the Ankeny Community School District split into two high schools, with both Ankeny High and Ankeny Centennial competing at the 4A level. In anticipation of adding Centennial to the League, the League approved the current four division format, beginning it in the 2012–13 school year, with Centennial joining the next year.

In 2015 the CIML was restructured for the 2016–2018 school years. The three division format, which comprises the Central, Iowa, and Metro Conferences, was reorganized like this:

Central	Iowa	Metro
Ames	Mason City	DM East
Ankeny	Fort Dodge	DM Hoover
Ankeny Centennial	Marshalltown	DM Lincoln
Southeast Polk	Dowling Catholic	DM North
Valley	Johnston	DM Roosevelt
Waukee	Urbandale	Ottumwa

Representatives from the 12 schools of the Central Iowa Conference (Ames, Ankeny, Centennial, Dowling Catholic, Ft. Dodge, Johnston, Marshalltown, Mason City, Southeast Polk, Urbandale, Valley (WDM), and Waukee) of the Central Iowa Metropolitan League met on Wednesday, February 4 in Johnston to discuss the realignment of the league moving forward. In previous discussions, the league was to be divided with the five Des Moines Public Schools, Ottumwa, and Indianola, in one conference and then the other 12 schools in two conferences. Since that time, Indianola has announced it will depart the CIML for the Little Hawkeye Conference in the 2016-2017 school year. As a result of that decision and action taken on February 4, the following recommendation will be made to the Council of Activities’ Directors for approval on February 25, 2015, and then the Principals of the league in a subsequent meeting thereafter.

A second Waukee high school, Northwest, opened in the fall of 2021 to compete in the CIML.

On March 1, 2021, nine high schools made the announcement to leave the CIML and form a new conference. These schools included Ames, Fort Dodge, Marshalltown, Mason City, and Ottumwa, as well as the five public Des Moines schools (East, Hoover, Lincoln, North, and Roosevelt). The schools left the conference for the 2022–23 season to create a new conference. The withdrawal was due to a low percentage in wins from the non-suburban schools in the conference. The new conference was called the Iowa Alliance Conference, and will include ten former CIML teams as well as East High, Waterloo.

== Sports ==
The conference offers the following sports:

- Fall — Volleyball, boys' cross-country, girls' cross-country, boys' golf and girls' swimming.
- Winter — Boys' basketball, girls' basketball, bowling, wrestling and boys' swimming.
- Spring — Boys' track and field, girls' track and field, boys' soccer, girls' soccer, boys' tennis, girls' tennis and girls' golf.
- Summer — Baseball and softball.

The CIML, like all other conferences in Iowa, does not sponsor football. The IHSAA has a separate classification system for football, and competition is set up in districts separate from conference affiliation.

Although the member schools field freshman — and in some cases, junior varsity — teams in many of the above-mentioned sports, conference championships are determined at sophomore and varsity levels only.
