= Dennis Gibson (American football) =

American football player (born 1964)

No. 98, 57
- Position: Linebacker

Personal information
- Born: February 8, 1964 (age 62); Des Moines, Iowa, U.S.
- Listed height: 6 ft 2 in (1.88 m)
- Listed weight: 240 lb (109 kg)

Career information
- High school: Ankeny (Ankeny, Iowa)
- College: Iowa State
- NFL draft: 1987: 8th round, 203rd overall pick

Career history
- Detroit Lions (1987–1993); San Diego Chargers (1994–1995)

Awards and highlights
- Second-team All-Big Eight (1986)

Career NFL statistics
- Tackles: 613
- Sacks: 2.5
- Interceptions: 3
- Stats at Pro Football Reference

Dennis Michael Gibson (born February 8, 1964) is an American former professional football player who was a linebacker in the National Football League (NFL) from 1987 to 1995 for the Detroit Lions and the San Diego Chargers. He played college football for the Iowa State Cyclones. He was selected by the Lions in the eighth round of the 1987 NFL draft with the 203rd overall pick. Perhaps his most memorable moment came in the 1994 AFC Championship Game, when he sent the Chargers to the Super Bowl by lunging to block a 4th-down pass attempt from Pittsburgh Steelers quarterback Neil O'Donnell in the end zone to win the game.

== Uptown Food and Beverage ==
Gibson owned a pizza place in Johnston, Iowa, called Encore Pizza (formerly known as the Pizza Oven).

He now owns a restaurant in Ankeny, Iowa called Uptown Food and Beverage.
