= Benj Sampson =

American baseball player (born 1975)

- Pitcher
- Born: April 27, 1975 (age 51); Des Moines, Iowa, U.S.
- Batted: Right Threw: Left

MLB debut
- September 9, 1998, for the Minnesota Twins

Last MLB appearance
- August 19, 1999, for the Minnesota Twins

MLB statistics
- Win–loss record: 4–2
- Earned run average: 6.83
- Strikeouts: 72
- Stats at Baseball Reference

Teams
- Minnesota Twins (1998–1999)

Benjamin Damon Sampson (born April 27, 1975) is an American former Major League Baseball (MLB) pitcher who played for the Minnesota Twins in 1998 and 1999. Sampson also pitched 11 seasons in the minor leagues, recording more than 6 strikeouts per 9 innings pitched, and winning 72 games. He also pitched internationally for the 2004 Uni-President Lions, posting a 1-2 record with a 1.29 ERA in 21 innings pitched.
