= Waukee, Iowa =

- City
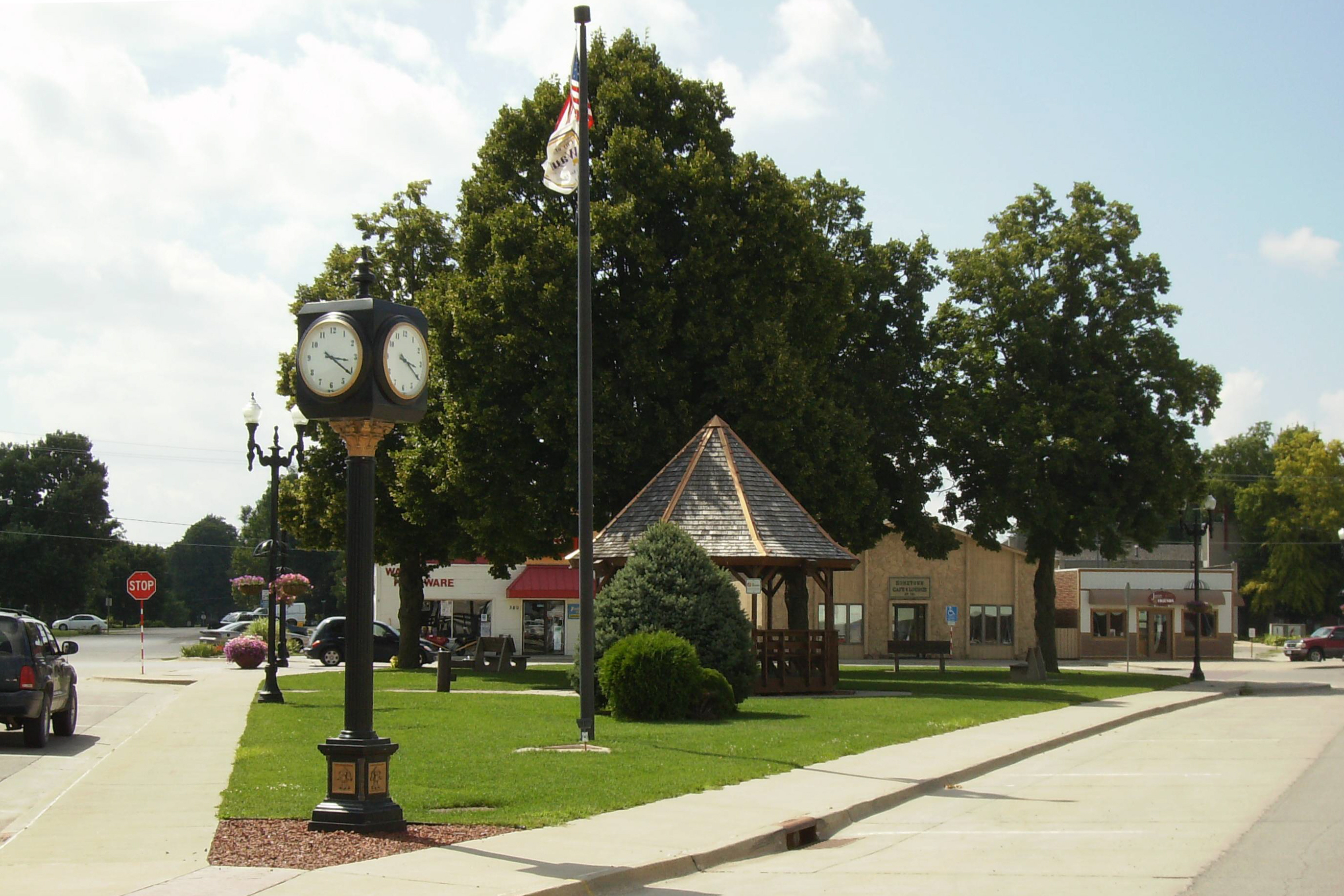
- Triangle Park in Downtown Waukee

- Flag
- Motto: "The Key To Good Living"
- Interactive location map of Waukee
- Coordinates: 41.590480°N 93.882818°W
- Country: United States
- State: Iowa
- County: Dallas
- Founded: 1869
- Incorporated: July 2, 1878

Government
  - Mayor: Courtney Clarke (D)
  - Mayor Pro-Tem: Charlie Bottenberg
  - City Council: Anna Pierce; Chris Crone; Ben Sinclair; Rob Grove
  - Iowa Senate: Sarah Trone Garriott (D)
  - Iowa House: Kenan Judge (D)
  - U.S. House: Zach Nunn (R)

Area
  - City: 22.002 sq mi (56.985 km^{2})
  - Land: 21.907 sq mi (56.738 km^{2})
  - Water: 0.095 sq mi (0.246 km^{2}) 0.43%
- Elevation: 1,047 ft (319 m)

Population (2020)
  - City: 23,940
  - Estimate (2024): 34,420
  - Density: 1,093/sq mi (421.9/km^{2})
  - Urban: 542,486
  - Metro: 753,913
- Time zone: UTC–6 (Central (CST))
  - Summer (DST): UTC–5 (CDT)
- ZIP Code: 50263
- Area code: 515
- FIPS code: 19-82695
- GNIS feature ID: 2397221
- Website: waukee.org

Waukee is a city in Dallas County, Iowa, United States. The population was 23,940 at the 2020 census, and was estimated at 34,890 in 2025, making it the 16th-most populous city in Iowa. It is part of the Des Moines metropolitan area.

In 2017, Apple Inc. chose Waukee as the location of a massive $1.38 billion data center campus.

== History ==
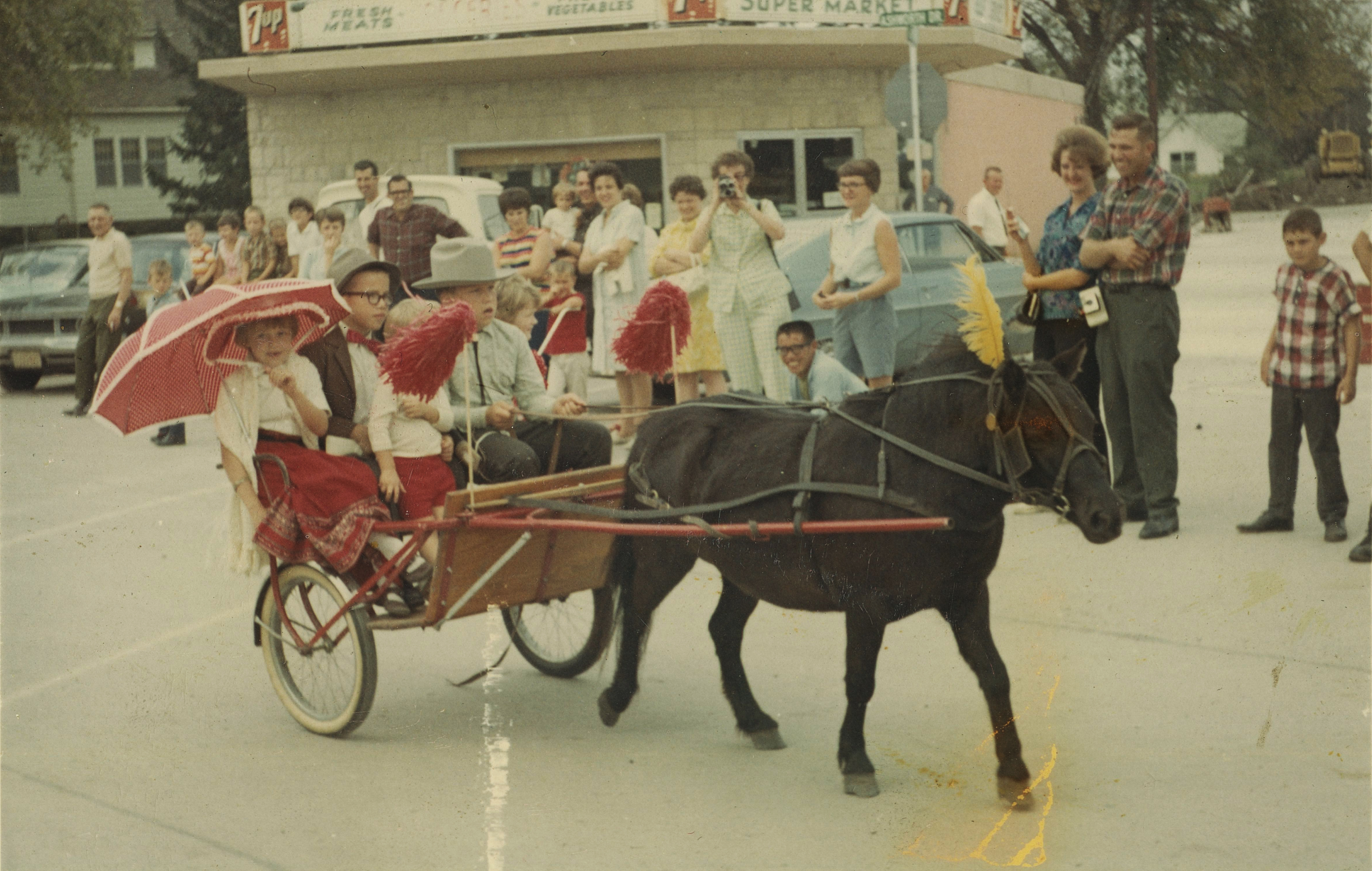
Main Street, Waukee, Iowa (1968)

Waukee was laid out as a town in 1869. It is thought to be named after The Milwaukee Road Railroad. Waukee was incorporated on December 23, 1878.

== Geography ==
According to the United States Census Bureau, the city has a total area of 22.002 square miles (56.98 km^{2}), of which 21.907 square miles (56.74 km^{2}) is land and 0.095 square miles (0.25 km^{2}) (0.43%) is water. It is known for its Waukee Stadium.

=== Climate ===
Humid continental climate is a climatic region typified by large seasonal temperature differences, with warm to hot (and often humid) summers and cold (sometimes severely cold) winters. The Köppen climate classification subtype for this climate is "Dfa" (Hot summer, continental climate).

== Education ==
The Waukee Community School District is the fastest-growing school district in the state of Iowa with more than 2,200 staff members serving more than 13,600 students in grades preschool through twelfth grade.

Its schools serve students from Clive, Urbandale, Waukee, and West Des Moines as well as open enrollment students from other communities outside the 55 square miles of its district boundaries.

There are currently ten elementary schools, two middle schools (grades 6/7), and two middle schools (grades 8/9) in Waukee as well as the Waukee High School and Waukee Northwest High School.

The district built a second high school, called Waukee Northwest High School, which opened for the 2021 school year.

== Demographics ==
Historical population
Census	Pop.	Note	%±
1880	245		—
1890	240		−2.0%
1900	292		21.7%
1910	340		16.4%
1920	375		10.3%
1930	445		18.7%
1940	473		6.3%
1950	501		5.9%
1960	687		37.1%
1970	1,577		129.5%
1980	2,227		41.2%
1990	2,512		12.8%
2000	5,126		104.1%
2010	13,790		169.0%
2020	23,940		73.6%
2025 (est.)	34,890		45.7%
U.S. Decennial Census; 2020 Census

=== Racial and ethnic composition ===
Waukee, Iowa – racial and ethnic composition Note: the US Census treats Hispanic/Latino as an ethnic category. This table excludes Latinos from the racial categories and assigns them to a separate category. Hispanics/Latinos may be of any race.
Race / ethnicity (NH = non-Hispanic)	Pop. 1990	Pop. 2000	Pop. 2010	Pop. 2020	% 1990	% 2000	% 2010	% 2020
White alone (NH)	2,496	5,006	12,681	19,553	99.36%	97.66%	91.96%	81.68%
Black or African American alone (NH)	0	22	173	890	0.00%	0.43%	1.25%	3.72%
Native American or Alaska Native alone (NH)	1	0	10	35	0.04%	0.00%	0.07%	0.15%
Asian alone (NH)	7	29	361	1,264	0.28%	0.57%	2.62%	5.28%
Pacific Islander alone (NH)	—	1	8	15	—	0.02%	0.06%	0.06%
Other race alone (NH)	0	5	12	83	0.00%	0.10%	0.09%	0.35%
Mixed race or multiracial (NH)	—	25	133	847	—	0.49%	0.96%	3.54%
Hispanic or Latino (any race)	8	38	412	1,253	0.32%	0.74%	2.99%	5.23%
Total	2,512	5,126	13,790	23,940	100.00%	100.00%	100.00%	100.00%

=== 2020 census ===
As of the 2020 census, there were 23,940 people, 9,107 households, and 6,208 families residing in the city. The population density was 1,151.01 inhabitants per square mile (444.4/km^{2}), and there were 9,831 housing units at an average density of 472.67 per square mile (182.5/km^{2}).

The median age was 33.9 years. 29.0% of residents were under the age of 18 and 11.1% were 65 years of age or older. For every 100 females there were 94.1 males, and for every 100 females age 18 and over there were 89.8 males age 18 and over.

97.4% of residents lived in urban areas, while 2.6% lived in rural areas.

Of the 9,107 households, 40.2% had children under the age of 18 living in them. 55.0% were married-couple households, 6.8% were cohabitating couples, 24.2% were households with a female householder and no spouse or partner present, and 14.1% were households with a male householder and no spouse or partner present. 31.8% of all households were non-families, 25.3% of all households were made up of individuals, and 8.9% had someone living alone who was 65 years of age or older.

There were 9,831 housing units, of which 7.4% were vacant. The homeowner vacancy rate was 2.5% and the rental vacancy rate was 12.1%.

Racial composition as of the 2020 census
Race	Number	Percent
White	19,902	83.1%
Black or African American	893	3.7%
American Indian and Alaska Native	60	0.3%
Asian	1,268	5.3%
Native Hawaiian and Other Pacific Islander	16	0.1%
Some other race	366	1.5%
Two or more races	1,435	6.0%
Hispanic or Latino (of any race)	1,253	5.2%

=== American Community Survey estimates ===
As of the 2023 American Community Survey, there are 10,652 estimated households in Waukee with an average of 2.52 persons per household. The city has a median household income of $106,728. Approximately 7.3% of the city's population lives at or below the poverty line. Waukee has an estimated 75.0% employment rate, with 56.7% of the population holding a bachelor's degree or higher and 95.9% holding a high school diploma. There were 11,023 housing units at an average density of 503.17 per square mile (194.3/km^{2}).

The top five reported languages (people were allowed to report up to two languages, thus the figures will generally add to more than 100%) were English (85.0%), Spanish (2.9%), Indo-European (5.2%), Asian and Pacific Islander (3.7%), and Other (3.2%).

The median age in the city was 34.4 years.

=== Housing market ===
According to realtor website Zillow, the average price of a home as of November 30, 2025, in Waukee was $336,914.

=== 2010 census ===
As of the 2010 census, there were 13,790 people, 5,154 households, and 3,689 families living in the city. The population density was 1,063.2 inhabitants per square mile (410.5/km^{2}). There were 5,378 housing units at an average density of 414.6 per square mile (160.1/km^{2}). The racial makeup of the city was 93.86% White, 1.26% African American, 0.15% Native American, 2.64% Asian, 0.06% Pacific Islander, 0.92% from some other races and 1.11% from two or more races. Hispanic or Latino people of any race were 2.99% of the population.

There were 5,154 households, of which 44.8% had children under the age of 18 living with them, 59.0% were married couples living together, 9.3% had a female householder with no husband present, 3.3% had a male householder with no wife present, and 28.4% were non-families. 23.0% of all households were made up of individuals, and 6.7% had someone living alone who was 65 years of age or older. The average household size was 2.67 and the average family size was 3.19.

The median age in the city was 31.8 years. 32% of residents were under the age of 18; 5.1% were between the ages of 18 and 24; 36.3% were from 25 to 44; 18.5% were from 45 to 64; and 8% were 65 years of age or older. The gender makeup of the city was 48.6% male and 51.4% female.

=== 2000 census ===
As of the 2000 census, there were 5,126 people, 1,927 households, and 1,445 families residing in the city. The population density was 610.9 inhabitants per square mile (235.9/km^{2}). There were 2,087 housing units at an average density of 248.7 per square mile (96.0/km^{2}). The racial makeup of the city was 98.17% White, 0.43% African American, 0.00% Native American, 0.57% Asian, 0.02% Pacific Islander, 0.31% from some other races and 0.51% from two or more races. Hispanic or Latino people of any race were 0.74% of the population.

There were 1,927 households, out of which 43.0% had children under the age of 18 living with them, 64.8% were married couples living together, 8.2% had a female householder with no husband present, and 25.0% were non-families. 21.1% of all households were made up of individuals, and 6.7% had someone living alone who was 65 years of age or older. The average household size was 2.66 and the average family size was 3.12.

In the city, the population was spread out, with 30.4% under the age of 18, 5.5% from 18 to 24, 36.4% from 25 to 44, 19.9% from 45 to 64, and 7.6% who were 65 years of age or older. The median age was 33 years. For every 100 females, there were 98.0 males. For every 100 females age 18 and over, there were 91.1 males.

The median income for a household in the city was $58,024, and the median income for a family was $64,362. Males had a median income of $38,958 and females had a median income of $30,898. The per capita income for the city was $24,351. About 2.1% of families and 3.0% of the population were below the poverty line, including 3.5% of those under age 18 and 6.6% of those age 65 or over.

== Transportation ==
HIRTA provides demand response service in Waukee. However, as of 2023, Waukee is the largest city in Iowa without fixed-route public transit service. Des Moines Area Regional Transit serves Clive approximately half a mile from Waukee with the Route 92 express service.

== Notable people ==
- Paul Gregory — film, Television and stage producer
- Joey Jordison — former drummer for the band Slipknot
- Jake Knott — former Iowa State and Philadelphia Eagles linebacker
- Talia Leman — CEO and a founder of RandomKid, an organization that empowers young people to do good deeds
- Hal Manders — relief pitcher in Major League Baseball; born in Waukee
- Anthony Nelson - former Iowa and current Tampa Bay Buccaneers linebacker
- Ken Smith — internationally acclaimed landscape architect; born in Waukee

== See also ==
- Raccoon River Valley Trail
