= Adem Bona =

Nigerian-Turkish basketball player (born 2003)

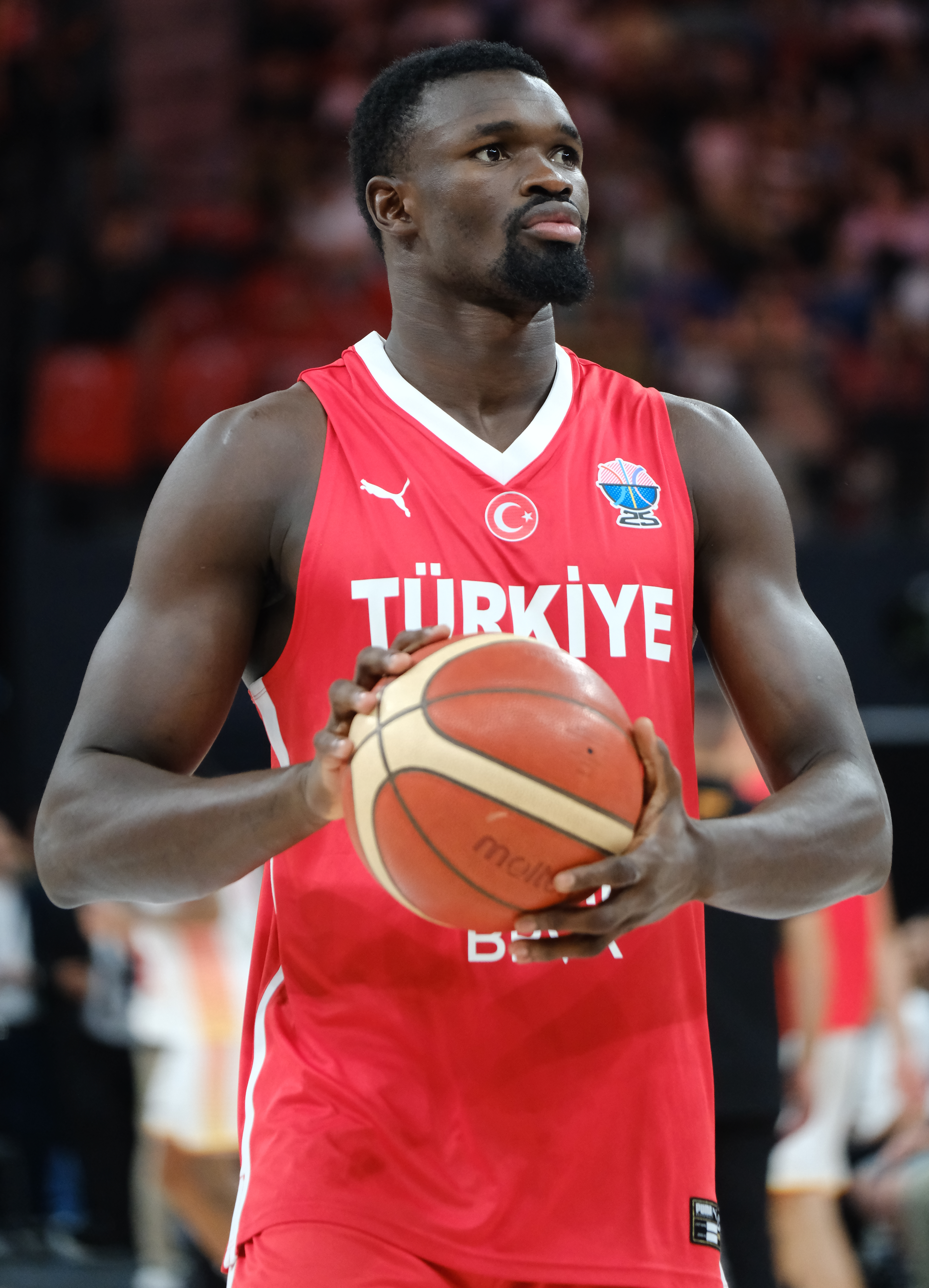
- Bona with Turkey national team in 2025

No. 30 – Philadelphia 76ers
- Position: Power forward
- League: NBA

Personal information
- Born: 28 March 2003 (age 23) Lagos, Nigeria
- Listed height: 6 ft 10 in (2.08 m)
- Listed weight: 235 lb (107 kg)

Career information
- High school: Prolific Prep (Napa, California)
- College: UCLA (2022–2024)
- NBA draft: 2024: 2nd round, 41st overall pick
- Drafted by: Philadelphia 76ers
- Playing career: 2019–present

Career history
- 2019–2020: Karşıyaka
- 2024–present: Philadelphia 76ers
- 2024–2025: →Delaware Blue Coats

Career highlights
- First-team All-Pac-12 (2024); Pac-12 Defensive Player of the Year (2024); 2× Pac-12 All-Defensive Team (2023, 2024); Pac-12 Freshman of the Year (2023); Pac-12 All-Freshman Team (2023); McDonald's All-American (2022)
- Stats at NBA.com
- Stats at Basketball Reference
Medals
Men's basketball
Representing Turkey
EuroBasket
Silver medal – second place	2025 Cyprus–Finland–Poland–Latvia
FIBA U18 European Championship
Silver medal – second place	2019 Greece	Team
FIBA U16 European Championship
Bronze medal – third place	2018 Serbia	Team

Adem Bona Okoro (born Ikechukwu Stanley Okoro; 28 March 2003) is a Nigerian and Turkish professional basketball player for the Philadelphia 76ers of the National Basketball Association (NBA). He played college basketball for the UCLA Bruins. Named a McDonald's All-American in high school, he was named to the Pac-12 All-Defensive Team and voted the Pac-12 Freshman of the Year in 2023. Bona was a first-team All-Pac-12 selection and voted the Pac-12 Defensive Player of the Year in 2024. He was selected by the 76ers in the second round of the 2024 NBA draft.

== Early life and career ==
Adem Bona Okoro was born Ikechukwu Stanley Okoro in Lagos, Nigeria, as the youngest of five children. He grew up playing association football as a midfielder but switched to basketball due to his height. He often played basketball with makeshift hoops in fields, sometimes without a ball. Okoro was playing for about one year when a video of him drew the attention of Turkish coach Türkay Çakıroğlu, who then contacted Istanbul Basket coach Nevzat Özdemir. At age 13, Bona moved to Turkey, leaving behind the rest of his family, and began his career with Istanbul Basket. In February 2019, he moved to Pınar Karşıyaka and continued competing at the youth level.

On 30 October 2019, Bona made his professional debut for Pınar Karşıyaka, playing one minute in a 77–57 win over Donar in the FIBA Europe Cup. On 16 November, he debuted in the Basketball Super League (BSL), scoring two points in an 84–55 victory over Galatasaray.

== High school career ==
On 18 September 2020, it was announced that Bona would continue his career at Prolific Prep in Napa, California.

=== Recruiting ===
Bona was a consensus five-star recruit and one of the top players in the 2022 class, according to major recruiting services. On 1 November 2021, he committed to playing college basketball for UCLA over an offer from Kentucky.

College recruiting
Name	Hometown	School	Height	Weight	Commit date
Adem Bona; C	Lagos, Nigeria	Prolific Prep (CA)	6 ft 10 in (2.08 m)	225 lb (102 kg)	Nov 1, 2021
Adem Bona; C	Recruit ratings: Rivals: 247Sports: ESPN: (91)				
Overall recruit ranking: Rivals: 21 247Sports: 11 ESPN: 13
Note: In many cases, Scout, Rivals, 247Sports, On3, and ESPN may conflict in their listings of height and weight.; In these cases, the average was taken. ESPN grades are on a 100-point scale.; Sources: "UCLA 2022 Basketball Commitments". Rivals.; "2022 UCLA Bruins Recruiting Class". ESPN.; "2022 Team Ranking". Rivals.

== College career ==
As a freshman at the University of California, Los Angeles, in 2022–23, Bona improved after about a month of foul trouble and dropped passes. On 2 January 2023, he was named the Pac-12's freshman of the week after scoring the go-ahead basket in a comeback win over Washington State, followed by a season-high 18 points and three blocks in a victory against Washington. He won consecutive freshman of the week honors after grabbing 10 rebounds along with two blocked shots to help UCLA beat USC. On 2 March, Bona had a career-high 11 rebounds against Arizona State. In the 2023 Pac-12 tournament, he injured his left shoulder in the semifinals against Oregon. He missed the finals against Arizona, who defeated UCLA for the title.

The Bruins received a No. 2 seed in the 2023 NCAA tournament. Bona was cleared to return in their opener, but he did not play in the 86–53 blowout over No. 15 seed UNC Asheville. He returned in the following game against Northwestern, but reaggravated his shoulder late in the game. He was out for two minutes before returning to make a key block in the final minutes to help secure a 68–63 win over the seventh-seeded Wildcats. He was sidelined again for their next game against Gonzaga, which UCLA lost 79–76. For the season, Bona started 32 games and averaged 7.7 points and 5.3 rebounds in 22.9 minutes per game, and led the Bruins with 57 blocks. He converted 67.5% of his field goals, which ranked second in the Pac-12. He was named to the Pac-12 All-Defensive and Pac-12 All-Freshman teams and was voted the Pac-12 Freshman of the Year. He also received honorable mention for the All-Pac-12 team. After the season, he declared for the 2023 NBA draft, while retaining his college eligibility. Following surgery for a torn labrum in April, which prevented him from engaging in individual workouts prior to the draft, Bona withdrew from the draft.

While recovering from his injury, Bona added a midrange jump shot and post moves to his offensive game. He did not play in the Bruins' tour of Spain or in their exhibition game. In their 2023–24 season-opener, he had career highs of 28 points and four blocks in a 75–44 win over Saint Francis. He also had nine rebounds. Bona was named to the All-Pac-12 first team and voted the Pac-12 Defensive Player of the Year, the second consecutive Bruin to win the award after Jaylen Clark in 2023. He averaged 12.4 points, 5.9 rebounds and 1.8 blocks per game, but continued to get into foul trouble. After the season, Bona announced that he was leaving UCLA and declaring for the NBA draft. He finished with 115 career blocks, which ranked sixth in Bruins history.

== Professional career ==
On 21 July 2024, Bona was selected by the Philadelphia 76ers in the second round of the 2024 NBA draft with the 41st overall pick. He made his NBA debut on 23 October, in a 124–109 loss to the Milwaukee Bucks. Throughout his rookie season, Bona has been assigned several times to the Delaware Blue Coats. On 3 April 2025, Bona scored a career-high 28 points in a 126–113 loss against the Bucks. In 58 games (11 starts) for the 76ers during his rookie campaign, he averaged 5.8 points, 4.2 rebounds, and 0.5 assists.

Bona made 71 appearances (including 18 starts) for Philadelphia during the 2025–26 NBA season, recording averages of 4.8 points, 4.3 rebounds and 0.5 assists.

== National team career ==
At the 2019 FIBA U16 European Championship in Udine, Bona averaged 14.1 points, 10.3 rebounds and four blocks per game, leading Turkey to fifth place. He ranked second at the tournament in rebounds and blocks and was named to the All-Star Five.

== Career statistics ==
Legend
GP	Games played	GS	Games started	MPG	Minutes per game
FG%	Field goal percentage	3P%	3-point field goal percentage	FT%	Free throw percentage
RPG	Rebounds per game	APG	Assists per game	SPG	Steals per game
BPG	Blocks per game	PPG	Points per game	**Bold**	Career high

=== NBA ===
==== Regular season ====
Year	Team	GP	GS	MPG	FG%	3P%	FT%	RPG	APG	SPG	BPG	PPG
2024–25	Philadelphia	58	11	15.6	**.703**	.000	.670	4.2	**.5**	**.4**	**1.2**	**5.8**
2025–26	Philadelphia	**71**	**18**	**17.4**	.595	**.333**	**.708**	**4.3**	**.5**	**.4**	**1.2**	4.8
Career		129	29	16.6	.646	.286	.690	4.3	.5	.4	1.2	5.3

==== Playoffs ====
Year	Team	GP	GS	MPG	FG%	3P%	FT%	RPG	APG	SPG	BPG	PPG
2026	Philadelphia	10	3	9.6	.500	—	.625	2.1	.1	.1	.7	2.6
Career		10	3	9.6	.500	—	.625	2.1	.1	.1	.7	2.6

=== College ===
Year	Team	GP	GS	MPG	FG%	3P%	FT%	RPG	APG	SPG	BPG	PPG
2022–23	UCLA	33	32	22.9	**.675**	—	.573	5.3	.7	.6	1.7	7.7
2023–24	UCLA	**33**	**33**	**26.5**	.588	.000	**.696**	**5.9**	**1.2**	**1.1**	**1.8**	**12.4**
Career		66	65	24.7	.621	.000	.652	5.6	1.0	.8	1.7	10.1

== Personal life ==
In April 2018, Okoro became a Turkish citizen and officially changed his name to Adem Bona.
