= Amari Bailey =

American basketball player (born 2004)

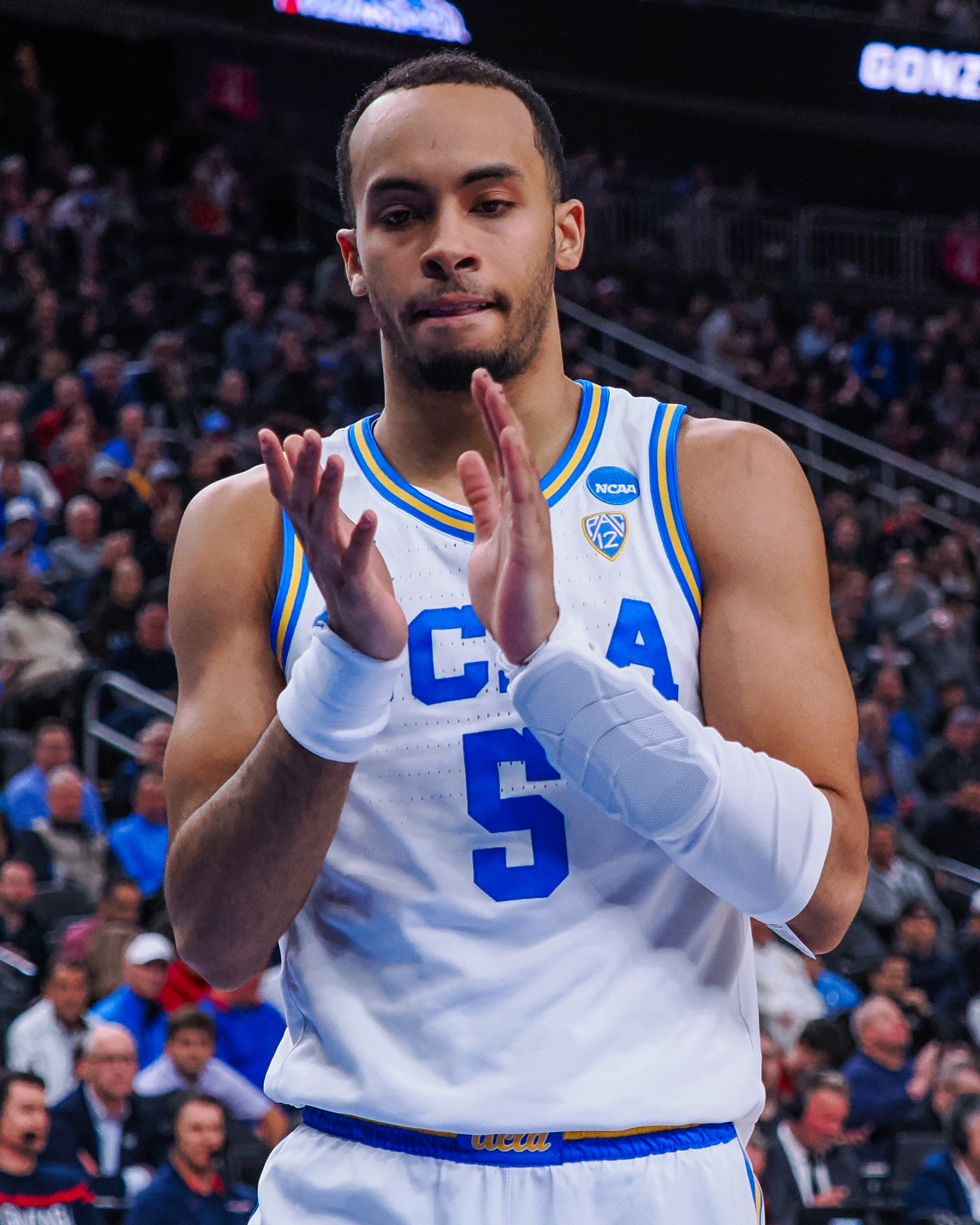
- Bailey with UCLA in 2023

No. 10 – Hapoel Be'er Sheva
- Position: Point guard / shooting guard
- League: Israeli Premier League

Personal information
- Born: February 17, 2004 (age 22) New Orleans, Louisiana, U.S.
- Listed height: 6 ft 3 in (1.91 m)
- Listed weight: 185 lb (84 kg)

Career information
- High school: Sierra Canyon (Los Angeles, California)
- College: UCLA (2022–2023)
- NBA draft: 2023: 2nd round, 41st overall pick
- Drafted by: Charlotte Hornets
- Playing career: 2023–present

Career history
- 2023–2024: Charlotte Hornets
- 2023–2024: →Greensboro Swarm
- 2024: Long Island Nets
- 2024–2025: Iowa Wolves
- 2026–present: Hapoel Jerusalem
- 2026–present: →Hapoel Be'er Sheva

Career highlights
- Pac-12 All-Freshman Team (2023); McDonald's All-American (2022); California Mr. Basketball (2021)
- Stats at NBA.com
- Stats at Basketball Reference
Medals
Men's basketball
Representing United States
FIBA Americas U16 Championship
Gold medal – first place	2019 Brazil	Team

Amari Bailey (born February 17, 2004) is an American professional basketball player for Hapoel Be'er Sheva of the Israeli Basketball Premier League, on loan from Hapoel Jerusalem. In high school, he was selected as a McDonald's All-American and California Mr. Basketball. He played college basketball for the UCLA Bruins, earning all-freshman honors in the Pac-12 Conference in his only season. He was selected by the Charlotte Hornets in the second round of the 2023 NBA draft, and played for them during 2023-24.

== Early life ==
Bailey was born in New Orleans, Louisiana. He is the son of Johanna Leia (original surname Edelberg), a social media influencer and former Ford model, and former NFL Indianapolis Colts wide receiver Aaron Bailey; the two eventually split. Edelberg is Jewish, as is Amari.

Bailey grew up in Chicago, Illinois, and was raised by Edelberg. Attending Skinner West Elementary School in the West Loop neighborhood in the Near West Side, he was the most talked about 7th grade basketball player in Chicago. In 2017, when he was 12 years old he and his mother were featured when he was in middle school in Bringing Up Ballers, a Lifetime reality show that followed Chicago-area entrepreneur mothers of basketball players.

== High school career ==
He moved to Chatsworth, California, in the Los Angeles area to play for Sierra Canyon School ('22) in Chatsworth. As a freshman, Bailey helped his team win the California Interscholastic Federation (CIF) Open Division state title. As a junior, he averaged 29.2 points, 9.1 rebounds, and 6.5 assists per game.

He was named California Mr. Basketball, the MaxPreps.com California Player of the Year, Los Angeles Daily News All-Area Player of the Year, and Gold Coast League MVP. He also earned All-CIF Open Division honors as a sophomore, junior, and senior. He was selected as a McDonald's All-American as a senior in 2021–22.

=== Recruiting ===
Bailey was a consensus five-star recruit and one of the top players in the 2022 class, according to major recruiting services. At age 13, while in eighth grade, he committed to playing college basketball for DePaul, but he decommitted before starting high school. He later committed to UCLA as a high school freshman, before decommitting again eight months later when their coach, Steve Alford, was fired. On February 17, 2021, Bailey recommitted to UCLA and their new coach, Mick Cronin.

Bailey was seen as the number one player by every recruiting service entering the summer off his senior season, before he suffered an injury which resulted in Bailey missing playing in the AAU circuit and early parts of Sierra Canyon season. 247Sports ranked Bailey as the third-best combo guard in his high school class, and ESPN ranked him the No. 2 shooting guard and No. 5 in the nation among all players in his high school class.

College recruiting
Name	Hometown	School	Height	Weight	Commit date
Amari Bailey; SG	Chicago, IL	Sierra Canyon (CA)	6 ft 5 in (1.96 m)	190 lb (86 kg)	Feb 17, 2021
Amari Bailey; SG	Recruit ratings: Rivals: 247Sports: ESPN: (93)				
Overall recruit ranking: Rivals: 13 247Sports: 10 ESPN: 5
Note: In many cases, Scout, Rivals, 247Sports, On3, and ESPN may conflict in their listings of height and weight.; In these cases, the average was taken. ESPN grades are on a 100-point scale.; Sources: "UCLA 2022 Basketball Commitments". Rivals.; "2022 UCLA Bruins Recruiting Class". ESPN.; "2022 Team Ranking". Rivals.

== College career ==
Bailey began the 2022–23 season winning the Pac-12 Conference's freshman of the week award twice, and had a couple of 19-point games against Pepperdine and Stanford. He was injured against Kentucky when the Wildcats' center Oscar Tshiebwe stepped on his left foot. Bailey aggravated his injury the following game. From December 30, 2022, until January 26, 2023, he was sidelined for seven games due to discomfort in his foot. On February 9, Bailey scored 24 points in a win against Oregon State. After UCLA's best defender, Jaylen Clark, suffered a season-ending leg injury in the regular-season finale, Bailey assumed the task of defending the opposition's top perimeter player, and he also increased his scoring.

In the Bruins' opener in the 2023 Pac-12 tournament, Bailey scored a career-high 26 points in a win over Colorado. He had 19 points and seven rebounds in the finals, which UCLA lost 61–59 to Arizona. He was named to the 2023 All-Pac-12 Tournament team. He helped the Bruins advance to the Sweet 16 of the 2023 NCAA tournament, averaging 15.5 points and 6.0 assists while converting 49.5% of his field goals and 38.9% of his three-pointers. In the six games after Clark's injury, Bailey averaged 17.3 points and shot 56.1%. He ended the 2022–23 season with averages of 11.2 points, 3.8 rebounds, 2.2 assists, and 1.1 steals while shooting 49.5% from the field in 30 games, including 28 starts. He was named to the Pac-12 All-Freshman Team. After the season, he declared for the NBA draft.

On January 30, 2026, Bailey became the center of a major eligibility and legal controversy after it was reported that he had hired a lawyer and an agent to obtain college eligibility, despite having previously forgone his eligibility and playing 10 games in the NBA. On February 11, he visited the Grand Canyon Antelopes in an official recruiting visit during their game against New Mexico.

== Professional career ==
=== Charlotte Hornets / Greensboro Swarm (2023–2024) ===
Bailey was selected by the Charlotte Hornets in the second round of the 2023 NBA draft with the 41st overall pick. On July 14, 2023, he signed a two-way contract with the Hornets, which he said was worth $565,000. Playing for the Hornets in the 2023 NBA Summer League, he averaged nine points in 16 minutes per game. At 19 years of age, he was the 10th-youngest player in the league.

On November 17, 2023, he made his G-League debut with the Greensboro Swarm, and scored 26 points. In 2023-24, he averaged 18.8 points, 4.8 rebounds, 4.3 assists, and 1.4 steals shooting 45.2% from the floor in 30.9 minutes per game over 36 games.

Bailey made his NBA debut on November 12, 2023, for the Hornets against the New York Knicks. During the season he played 10 games for the team.

=== Long Island Nets (2024) ===
On September 21, 2024, Bailey signed with the Brooklyn Nets, but was waived on October 19. Eight days later, he joined the Long Island Nets in the G League. Playing for them in 2024 he averaged 14.9 points, 3.7 rebounds, 4.4 assists, and 26.6 minutes per game in 15 games.

=== Iowa Wolves (2024–2025) ===
On December 30, 2024, Bailey was traded to the Iowa Wolves in the G League in a three-team trade involving the Stockton Kings with Stockton receiving Chasson Randle from Iowa and Long Island acquiring Drew Timme from Stockton.Playing for Iowa in 2025, he averaged 9.4 points, 2.9 rebounds, 4.8 assists, 1.3 steals, and 23.3 minutes per game, over 11 games.

=== Hapoel Be'er Sheva (2026–present) ===
For the 2026-27 season, Bailey is playing for Hapoel Be'er Sheva of the Israeli Basketball Premier League, on loan from Hapoel Jerusalem, with whom he signed on September 6, 2026.

== National team career ==
Bailey represented the United States at the 2019 FIBA Under-16 Americas Championship in Brazil. He averaged 13.2 points, 4.2 rebounds, and 3.0 assists per game, helping his team win the gold medal.

== Career statistics ==
Legend
GP	Games played	GS	Games started	MPG	Minutes per game
FG%	Field goal percentage	3P%	3-point field goal percentage	FT%	Free throw percentage
RPG	Rebounds per game	APG	Assists per game	SPG	Steals per game
BPG	Blocks per game	PPG	Points per game	**Bold**	Career high

=== NBA ===
Year	Team	GP	GS	MPG	FG%	3P%	FT%	RPG	APG	SPG	BPG	PPG
2023–24	Charlotte	10	0	6.5	.333	.125	.857	.9	.7	.3	.0	2.3
Career		10	0	6.5	.333	.125	.857	.9	.7	.3	.0	2.3

=== College ===
Year	Team	GP	GS	MPG	FG%	3P%	FT%	RPG	APG	SPG	BPG	PPG
2022–23	UCLA	30	28	26.9	.495	.389	.698	3.8	2.2	1.1	.3	11.2

== Personal life ==
Bailey's father, Aaron, played football for the Indianapolis Colts of the National Football League.

== See also ==
- List of select Jewish basketball players
