= 2022–23 UCLA Bruins men's basketball team =

American college basketball season

2022–23 UCLA Bruins men's basketball

Pac-12 regular season champions

NCAA tournament, Sweet Sixteen
- Conference: Pac-12 Conference

Ranking
- Coaches: No. 8
- AP: No. 7
- Record: 31–6 (18–2 Pac-12)
- Head coach: Mick Cronin (4th season)
- Associate head coach: Darren Savino (4th season)
- Assistant coaches: Rod Palmer (4th season); Ivo Simović (1st season)
- Home arena: Pauley Pavilion (Capacity: 13,819)

2022–23 Pac-12 Conference men's basketball standings
	Conf.				Overall
Team	W		L	PCT	W		L	PCT
No. 7 UCLA	18	–	2	.900	31	–	6	.838
No. 8 Arizona†	14	–	6	.700	28	–	7	.800
USC	14	–	6	.700	22	–	11	.667
Oregon	12	–	8	.600	21	–	15	.583
Arizona State	11	–	9	.550	23	–	13	.639
Washington State	11	–	9	.550	17	–	17	.500
Utah	10	–	10	.500	17	–	15	.531
Washington	8	–	12	.400	16	–	16	.500
Colorado	8	–	12	.400	18	–	17	.514
Stanford	7	–	13	.350	14	–	19	.424
Oregon State	5	–	15	.250	11	–	21	.344
California	2	–	18	.100	3	–	29	.094
† Conference tournament winner Rankings from AP poll

The 2022–23 UCLA Bruins men's basketball team represented the University of California, Los Angeles during the 2022–23 NCAA Division I season. The Bruins were led by fourth-year head coach Mick Cronin, and they played their home games at Pauley Pavilion as members of the Pac-12 Conference. Guard/forward Jaime Jaquez Jr. was named a second-team All-American. He was voted the Pac-12 Player of the Year, and received first-team All-Pac-12 honors along with guard Tyger Campbell. Guard Jaylen Clark was named to the second team and was voted the Pac-12 Defensive Player of the Year. He was placed on the conference's all-defensive team along with forward Adem Bona, who was named the Pac-12 Freshman of the Year. Amari Bailey joined Bona on the Pac-12 All-Freshman Team, and Cronin was voted the Pac-12 Coach of the Year.

UCLA lost five players who were major contributors from their previous year's squad that went 27–8. However, the Bruins were also the only team in the power conferences whose roster consisted entirely of players who began their college careers at that school. With a 60–56 win over Colorado on February 26, 2023, the Bruins clinched their first Pac-12 regular season championship since 2012–13. UCLA ended the regular season with an 82–73 win over No. 8 Arizona, extending their home winning streak to 25 games, the longest active streak in the nation. They won the conference by four games and finished the season undefeated at home for the first time since 2006–07. Clark left the game with a lower leg injury, and was ruled out for the Pac-12 tournament. The top-seeded Bruins advanced to the tournament finals before losing 61–59 to No. 2-seed Arizona, ending their 12-game winning streak. UCLA played without its top two defenders, as Bona also missed the game with an injured left shoulder, which he suffered in the semifinals against Oregon.

The Bruins, who were vying for a No. 1 seed in the NCAA tournament, received a No. 2 seed in the West Region. It was their highest seeding since they were placed No. 1 in 2008. However, Clark was ruled out for the season. Bona was cleared to return in their opener, but he did not play in the 86–53 rout over No. 15-seed UNC Asheville. He played in the second round against Northwestern, which UCLA won to advance to the Sweet Sixteen for the third straight season. The Bruins were eliminated 79–76 by third-seeded Gonzaga. UCLA led by 13 points at halftime, but were down by 10 in the second half with 2:40 remaining. They outscored the Bulldogs 14–3, culminating with a three-point field goal by Bailey to take a one-point lead. However, Gonzaga's Julian Strawther made a 35-foot (11 m) basket with six seconds remaining, and they held on for the win. Bona sat out the game due to his shoulder. The game was rematch of the schools' Final Four matchup from 2021, also won by the Bulldogs, on a 40-foot (12 m) buzzer beater by Jalen Suggs to end the game. It was the Bruins' third consecutive loss to the Bulldogs in as many seasons.

== Offseason ==
=== Departures ===
UCLA Departures
Name	Pos.	Height	Weight	Year	Hometown	Reason for Departure
Jake Kyman	G/F	6'7"	215	Junior	Aliso Viejo, CA	Transferred to Wyoming
Jules Bernard	G	6’5”	207	Senior	Los Angeles, CA	Graduated; Declared for the 2022 NBA Draft
Myles Johnson	C	6'10"	255	RS Senior	Long Beach, CA	Retired to focus on master's degree
Johnny Juzang	SF	6'7"	215	Junior	Tarzana, CA	Declared for the 2022 NBA draft
Peyton Watson	PF	6'8"	200	Freshman	Long Beach, CA	Declared for the 2022 NBA draft
Cody Riley	SF	6'9"	250	RS Senior	Kansas City, KS	Graduated; Declared for the 2022 NBA draft

=== 2022 recruiting class ===
College recruiting information
Name	Hometown	School	Height	Weight	Commit date
Amari Bailey; SG	Chicago, IL	Sierra Canyon School (CA)	6 ft 4 in (1.93 m)	185 lb (84 kg)	Feb 17, 2021
Amari Bailey; SG	Recruit ratings: Rivals: 247Sports: ESPN: (93)				
Adem Bona; C	Lagos, Nigeria	Prolific Prep (CA)	6 ft 9 in (2.06 m)	225 lb (102 kg)	Nov 1, 2021
Adem Bona; C	Recruit ratings: Rivals: 247Sports: ESPN: (92)				
Dylan Andrews; PG	Los Angeles, CA	AZ Compass Prep (AZ)	6 ft 4 in (1.93 m)	190 lb (86 kg)	Apr 16, 2021
Dylan Andrews; PG	Recruit ratings: Rivals: 247Sports: ESPN: (87)				
Abramo Canka; SG	Genoa, Italy	PBC Lokomotiv Kuban	6 ft 6 in (1.98 m)	181 lb (82 kg)	Aug 3, 2022
Abramo Canka; SG	Recruit ratings: No ratings found				
Overall recruit ranking: Rivals: 6 247Sports: 8 ESPN: —
Note: In many cases, Scout, Rivals, 247Sports, On3, and ESPN may conflict in their listings of height and weight.; In these cases, the average was taken. ESPN grades are on a 100-point scale.; Sources: "UCLA 2022 Basketball Commitments". Rivals.; "2022 UCLA Bruins Recruiting Class". ESPN.; "2022 Team Ranking". Rivals.

== Preseason ==
=== Preseason rankings ===
- October 17 – No. 8 AP Top 25 poll
- October 26 – Pac-12 Men's Basketball Media Day in San Francisco

=== Preseason All-Americans/All-conference ===
- Jaime Jaquez Jr., first-team preseason All-American, Field of 68’s Almanac
- Jaime Jaquez Jr., first-team All-America selection, CBS Sports
- Tyger Campbell, Jaime Jaquez Jr. first team Media Preseason All-conference; Amari Bailey, Jaylen Clark, honorable mention

=== Preseason award watchlists ===
- Tyger Campbell, Bob Cousy Point Guard of the Year Award watch list
- Amari Bailey, Jerry West Shooting Guard of the Year Award watch list
- Jaime Jaquez Jr., Julius Erving Small Forward of the Year Award watch list
- Adem Bona, the Kareem Abdul-Jabbar Award (center) watch list
- Jaime Jaquez Jr., NABC Player of the Year Award watch list

== Roster ==
2022–23 UCLA Bruins men's basketball team
Players
Coaches

Pos.	#	Name	Height	Weight	Year	Previous school	Hometown
G	0	Jaylen Clark	6 ft 5 in (1.96 m)	210 lb (95 kg)	Jr	Etiwanda HS	Riverside, CA
G/F	1	Abramo Canka	6 ft 6 in (1.98 m)	200 lb (91 kg)	Fr	Lokomotiv Kuban	Genoa, Italy
G	2	Dylan Andrews	6 ft 2 in (1.88 m)	170 lb (77 kg)	Fr	Compass Prep	Gardena, CA
F	3	Adem Bona	6 ft 10 in (2.08 m)	235 lb (107 kg)	Fr	Prolific Prep	Ebonyi, Nigeria
G	4	Will McClendon	6 ft 2 in (1.88 m)	210 lb (95 kg)	RS Fr	Bishop Gorman HS	Las Vegas, NV
G	5	Amari Bailey	6 ft 5 in (1.96 m)	185 lb (84 kg)	Fr	Sierra Canyon	Chicago, IL
G	10	Tyger Campbell	5 ft 11 in (1.8 m)	180 lb (82 kg)	RS Sr	La Lumiere School	Cedar Rapids, IA
F	12	Mac Etienne	6 ft 10 in (2.08 m)	230 lb (104 kg)	RS Fr	Suffield Academy	New York, NY
F/C	14	Kenneth Nwuba	6 ft 10 in (2.08 m)	255 lb (116 kg)	RS Sr	Huntington Prep	Lagos, Nigeria
F	20	Logan Cremonesi (W)	6 ft 8 in (2.03 m)	220 lb (100 kg)	RS So	Mater Dei HS	Oceanside, CA
F	21	Evan Manjikian (W)	6 ft 8 in (2.03 m)	230 lb (104 kg)	Fr	Sierra Canyon	Glendale, CA
G	22	Jack Seidler (W) (redshirt)	6 ft 4 in (1.93 m)	190 lb (86 kg)	Fr	Marlboro HS	Marlboro, NJ
G/F	24	Jaime Jaquez Jr.	6 ft 7 in (2.01 m)	225 lb (102 kg)	Sr	Camarillo HS	Camarillo, CA
G	34	David Singleton	6 ft 4 in (1.93 m)	205 lb (93 kg)	Sr	Bishop Montgomery HS	Los Angeles, CA
G	43	Russell Stong (W)	6 ft 3 in (1.91 m)	190 lb (86 kg)	Sr	Crespi Carmelite HS	Northridge, CA

Head coach

- Mick Cronin (Cincinnati)

Assistant coach(es)

- Darren Savino (New Jersey City)
- Rod Palmer (UC Irvine)
- Ivo Simović (Belgrade, Serbia)

Legend

- (C) Team captain
- (S) Suspended
- (I) Ineligible
- (W) Walk-on
- Injured
- Current redshirt

Roster
Last update: April 12, 2022

== Schedule and results ==
Date time, TV	Rank^{#}	Opponent^{#}	Result	Record	High points	High rebounds	High assists	Site (attendance) city, state
Exhibition
November 2, 2022*; 7:00 p.m., P12N	No. 8	Concordia (CA)	W 93–63		25 – Tied	11 – Jaquez	3 – Tied	Pauley Pavilion (5,207); Los Angeles, CA
Regular season
November 7, 2022*; 8:30 p.m., P12N	No. 8	Sacramento State	W 76–50	1–0	17 – Clark	8 – Clark	4 – Tied	Pauley Pavilion (6,096); Los Angeles, CA
November 11, 2022*; 8:00 p.m., P12N	No. 8	Long Beach State	W 93–69	2–0	18 – Campbell	9 – Singleton	5 – Clark	Pauley Pavilion (9,811); Los Angeles, CA
November 14, 2022*; 7:00 p.m., P12N	No. 8	Norfolk State; Continental Tire Main Event campus site game	W 86–56	3–0	19 – Clark	9 – Clark	7 – Campbell	Pauley Pavilion (6,056); Los Angeles, CA
November 18, 2022*; 6:30 p.m., ESPNU	No. 8	vs. No. 19 Illinois; Continental Tire Main Event semifinals	L 70–79	3–1	22 – Campbell	9 – Jaquez	5 – Jaquez	T-Mobile Arena (8,707); Paradise, NV
November 20, 2022*; 2:30 p.m., ESPN	No. 8	vs. No. 5 Baylor; Continental Tire Main Event consolation	L 75–80	3–2	23 – Clark	10 – Clark	6 – Campbell	T-Mobile Arena (7,678); Paradise, NV
November 23, 2022*; 7:30 p.m., P12N	No. 19	Pepperdine	W 100–53	4–2	19 – Bailey	8 – Jaquez	4 – Bailey	Pauley Pavilion (8,107); Los Angeles, CA
November 27, 2022*; 4:00 p.m., P12N	No. 19	Bellarmine	W 81–60	5–2	27 – Jaquez	7 – Jaquez	10 – Campbell	Pauley Pavilion (6,001); Los Angeles, CA
December 1, 2022; 7:30 p.m., ESPN2	No. 21	at Stanford	W 80–66	6–2 (1–0)	27 – Jaquez	6 – Bailey	8 – Campbell	Maples Pavilion (4,848); Stanford, CA
December 4, 2022; 2:00 p.m., ESPN	No. 21	Oregon	W 65–56	7–2 (2–0)	14 – Tied	5 – Tied	3 – Jaquez	Pauley Pavilion (8,093); Los Angeles, CA
December 10, 2022*; 12:00 p.m., P12N	No. 19	Denver	W 87–64	8–2	24 – Clark	4 – Tied	6 – Andrews	Pauley Pavilion (6,459); Los Angeles, CA
December 14, 2022*; 6:00 p.m., FS1	No. 16	at No. 20 Maryland	W 87–60	9–2	19 – Clark	7 – Tied	3 – Tied	Xfinity Center (16,625); College Park, MD
December 17, 2022*; 2:30 p.m., CBS	No. 16	vs. No. 13 Kentucky; CBS Sports Classic	W 63–53	10–2	19 – Jaquez	12 – Jaquez	4 – Jaquez	Madison Square Garden (20,261); New York, NY
December 21, 2022*; 2:00 p.m., P12N	No. 13	UC Davis	W 81–54	11–2	18 – Clark	11 – Clark	3 – Tied	Pauley Pavilion (7,421); Los Angeles, CA
December 30, 2022; 8:00 p.m., P12N	No. 11	at Washington State	W 67–66	12–2 (3–0)	20 – Jaquez	8 – Jaquez	2 – Tied	Beasley Coliseum (3,238); Pullman, WA
January 1, 2023; 4:00 p.m., P12N	No. 11	at Washington	W 74–49	13–2 (4–0)	18 – Bona	11 – Clark	11 – Campbell	Alaska Airlines Arena (7,494); Seattle, WA
January 5, 2023; 6:30 p.m., ESPN	No. 10	USC; Rivalry	W 60–58	14–2 (5–0)	15 – Clark	10 – Bona	5 – Campbell	Pauley Pavilion (13,659); Los Angeles, CA
January 12, 2023; 8:00 p.m., P12N	No. 7	Utah	W 68–49	15–2 (6–0)	17 – Campbell	12 – Jaquez	7 – Campbell	Pauley Pavilion (11,771); Los Angeles, CA
January 14, 2023; 5:00 p.m., FOX	No. 7	Colorado	W 68–54	16–2 (7–0)	23 – Jaquez	13 – Jaquez	4 – Clark	Pauley Pavilion (8,106); Los Angeles, CA
January 19, 2023; 7:30 p.m., FS1	No. 5	at Arizona State	W 74–62	17–2 (8–0)	22 – Campbell	8 – Clark	5 – Jaquez	Desert Financial Arena (13,363); Tempe, AZ
January 21, 2023; 11:00 a.m., ABC	No. 5	at No. 11 Arizona; Rivalry	L 52–58	17–3 (8–1)	13 – Campbell	11 – Jaquez	7 – Campbell	McKale Center (14,688); Tucson, AZ
January 26, 2023; 6:00 p.m., ESPN2	No. 8	at USC; Rivalry	L 64–77	17–4 (8–2)	15 – Jaquez	8 – Jaquez	7 – Campbell	Galen Center (9,605); Los Angeles, CA
February 2, 2023; 6:00 p.m., FS1	No. 9	Washington	W 70–61	18–4 (9–2)	15 – Jaquez	10 – Jaquez	5 – Campbell	Pauley Pavilion (8,309); Los Angeles, CA
February 4, 2023; 4:00 p.m., P12N	No. 9	Washington State	W 76–52	19–4 (10–2)	24 – Jaquez	15 – Jaquez	9 – Campbell	Pauley Pavilion (10,117); Los Angeles, CA
February 9, 2023; 6:00 p.m., P12N	No. 7	at Oregon State	W 62–47	20–4 (11–2)	24 – Bailey	12 – Jaquez	5 – Campbell	Gill Coliseum (3,524); Corvallis, OR
February 11, 2023; 7:00 p.m., ESPN	No. 7	at Oregon	W 70–63	21–4 (12–2)	25 – Jaquez	12 – Jaquez	4 – Campbell	Matthew Knight Arena (10,272); Eugene, OR
February 16, 2023; 8:00 p.m., ESPN2	No. 4	Stanford	W 73–64	22–4 (13–2)	26 – Jaquez	8 – Jaquez	3 – Jaquez	Pauley Pavilion (10,241); Los Angeles, CA
February 18, 2023; 7:30 p.m., P12N	No. 4	California	W 78–43	23–4 (14–2)	20 – Jaquez	9 – Bailey	5 – Campbell	Pauley Pavilion (13,659); Los Angeles, CA
February 23, 2023; 7:30 p.m., FS1	No. 4	at Utah	W 78–71	24–4 (15–2)	23 – Jaquez	8 – Jaquez	5 – Tied	Jon M. Huntsman Center (8,497); Salt Lake City, UT
February 26, 2023; 1:00 p.m., CBS	No. 4	at Colorado	W 60–56	25–4 (16–2)	17 – Jaquez	7 – Bona	3 – Campbell	CU Events Center (8,680); Boulder, CO
March 2, 2023; 6:00 p.m., ESPN	No. 4	Arizona State	W 79–61	26–4 (17–2)	26 – Jaquez	11 – Clark	4 – Campbell	Pauley Pavilion (10,132); Los Angeles, CA
March 4, 2023; 7:00 p.m., ESPN	No. 4	No. 8 Arizona; Senior Day, Rivalry	W 82–73	27–4 (18–2)	22 – Jaquez	10 – Jaquez	4 – Campbell	Pauley Pavilion (13,659); Los Angeles, CA
Pac-12 Tournament
March 9, 2023; 12:00 p.m., P12N	(1) No. 2	vs. (9) Colorado; Quarterfinals	W 80–69	28–4	26 – Bailey	10 – Bona	7 – Campbell	T-Mobile Arena (10,406); Paradise, NV
March 10, 2023; 6:00 p.m., P12N	(1) No. 2	vs. (4) Oregon; Semifinals	W 75–56	29–4	28 – Campbell	10 – Jaquez	6 – Campbell	T-Mobile Arena (13,788); Paradise, NV
March 11, 2023; 7:30 p.m., ESPN	(1) No. 2	vs. (2) No. 8 Arizona; Championship, Rivalry	L 59–61	29–5	19 – Bailey	10 – Jaquez	2 – Campbell	T-Mobile Arena (14,022); Paradise, NV
NCAA Tournament
March 16, 2023; 7:05 p.m., TruTV	(2 W) No. 7	vs. (15 W) UNC Asheville; First Round	W 86–53	30–5	17 – Tied	8 – Jaquez	10 – Campbell	Golden 1 Center (14,527); Sacramento, CA
March 18, 2023; 5:40 p.m., TNT	(2 W) No. 7	vs. (7 W) Northwestern; Second Round	W 68–63	31–5	24 – Jaquez	8 – Jaquez	7 – Campbell	Golden 1 Center (16,806); Sacramento, CA
March 23, 2023; 6:45 p.m., CBS	(2 W) No. 7	vs. (3 W) No. 9 Gonzaga; Sweet Sixteen	L 76–79	31–6	29 – Jaquez	11 – Jaquez	9 – Campbell	T-Mobile Arena (18,544); Paradise, NV
*Non-conference game. ^{#}Rankings from AP Poll. (#) Tournament seedings in parentheses. All times are in Pacific Time.

== Statistics ==
Updated through Mar 6, 2023

Record	UCLA	OPP
Scoring	2299	1864
Scoring Average	74.2	60.1
Field goals - Att	875–1896	673–1652
Field goal %	.461	.407
3-point field goals - Att	190–545	203–652
3-point %	.349	.311
Free throws - Att	359–500	315–450
Free throw %	.718	.700
Rebounds	1118	985
Assists	447	348
Turnovers	327	504
Steals	269	151
Blocked Shots	119	85

== Rankings ==
Ranking movements Legend: ██ Increase in ranking ██ Decrease in ranking т = Tied with team above or below ( ) = First-place votes
	Week																			
Poll	Pre	1	2	3	4	5	6	7	8	9	10	11	12	13	14	15	16	17	18	Final
AP	8	8	19	21	19	16	13	11	10	7	5	8	9	7	4	4	4	2 (3)	7 (1)	Not released
Coaches	7	7	17	21	18т	14	9	8	8	6	5	7	9т	7	4	3	4	2	6	8

*AP does not release post-NCAA Tournament rankings

== Awards and honors ==
Recipient	Award (Pac-12 Conference)	Stats (PPG/RPG/APG)	Week	Date awarded	Ref.
Amari Bailey	Freshman of the Week	16.5 PPG/5.5 RPG/2.0 APG	3	November 28	
Amari Bailey	Freshman of the Week	15.5 PPG/6.0 RPG/3.5 APG	4	December 5	
Dylan Andrews	Freshman of the Week	11.0 PPG/4.0 RPG/6.0 APG	5	December 12	
Jaime Jaquez Jr.	Player of the Week	16.5 PPG/9.5 RPG/4.0 SPG/2.0 APG	6	December 19	
Adem Bona	Freshman of the Week	12.5 PPG/4.5 RPG/2.5 BPG/1.5 SPG	8	January 2	
Adem Bona	Freshman of the Week		9	January 9	
Jaime Jaquez Jr.	Player of the Week		10	February 13	
Amari Bailey	Freshman of the Week		10	February 13	
Amari Bailey	Freshman of the Week		12	February 27	
Jaime Jaquez Jr.	Player of the Week		17	March 6	
Jaime Jaquez Jr.	Player of the Year; All-Pac-12 first-team		-	March 7	
Adem Bona	Freshman of the Year; All-Pac-12 All-Freshman Team; All-Pac-12 All-Defense Team		-	March 7	
Jaylen Clark	Defensive Player of the Year; All-Pac-12 second-team All-Pac-12 All-Defense Team		-	March 7	
Mick Cronin	Coach of the Year		-	March 7	
Tyger Campbell	All-Pac-12 first-team		-	March 7	
Amari Bailey	All-Pac-12 All-Freshman Team		-	March 7	

- November 15, 2022 – Tyger Campbell and Jaime Jaquez Jr. named to the John R. Wooden Award watch list
- February 17, 2023 – Head coach Mick Cronin named to the 2023 Werner Ladder Naismith Men’s College Coach of the Year candidates list
- March 8, 2023 – Jaime Jaquez Jr. named a finalist for the Julius Erving Small Forward of the Year Award
- March 10, 2023 – Jaime Jaquez Jr. named a semifinalist for the Naismith College Player of the Year; Head coach Mick Cronin named a semifinalist for the Naismith College Coach of the Year
- March 14, 2023 – Jaylen Clark named a finalist for the Naismith Defensive Player of the Year Award
- March 28, 2023 – Jaylen Clark named the NABC Defensive Player of the Year
- April 2, 2023 – Jaylen Clark is the Naismith Defensive Player of the Year Award winner
- April 4, 2023 – Jaylen Clark is the NABC Defensive Player of the Year Award winner
- July 20, 2023 – Russell Stong is named to the NABC's Honors Court

== Team players drafted in the NBA ==
Year	Round	Pick	Player	NBA Team
2023	1	18	Jaime Jaquez Jr.	Miami Heat
2023	2	41	Amari Bailey	Charlotte Hornets
2023	2	53	Jaylen Clark	Minnesota Timberwolves

- Tyger Campbell signed a Summer League contract with the NBA Orlando Magic
- David Singleton signed a free agency contract with the NBA Atlanta Hawks
