= Jaylen Clark =

American basketball player (born 2001)

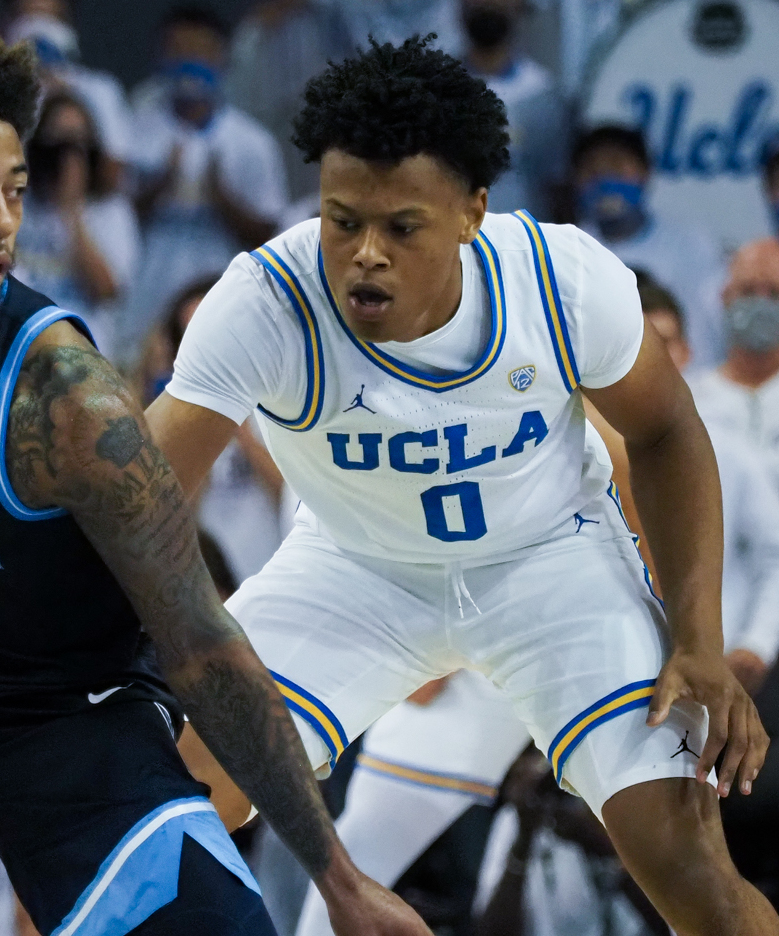
- Clark with UCLA in 2021

No. 7 – Minnesota Timberwolves
- Position: Shooting guard
- League: NBA

Personal information
- Born: October 13, 2001 (age 25) Riverside, California, U.S.
- Listed height: 6 ft 5 in (1.96 m)
- Listed weight: 205 lb (93 kg)

Career information
- High school: Centennial (Corona, California); Etiwanda (Rancho Cucamonga, California)
- College: UCLA (2020–2023)
- NBA draft: 2023: 2nd round, 53rd overall pick
- Drafted by: Minnesota Timberwolves
- Playing career: 2023–present

Career history
- 2023–present: Minnesota Timberwolves
- 2023–2025: →Iowa Wolves

Career highlights
- Naismith Defensive Player of the Year (2023); NABC Defensive Player of the Year (2023); Second-team All-Pac-12 (2023); Pac-12 Defensive Player of the Year (2023); 2× Pac-12 All-Defensive Team (2022, 2023)
- Stats at NBA.com
- Stats at Basketball Reference

Jaylen Bryce Clark (born October 13, 2001) is an American professional basketball player for the Minnesota Timberwolves of the National Basketball Association (NBA). He played college basketball for the UCLA Bruins of the Pac-12 Conference, earning national honors as both the Naismith Defensive Player of the Year and NABC Defensive Player of the Year as a junior in 2023, when he was also voted the Pac-12 Defensive Player of the Year. A two-time Pac-12 All-Defensive Team selection, Clark was named second-team All-Pac-12 as well that year. He was selected by the Timberwolves in the second round of the 2023 NBA draft.

== Early life and high school career ==
Clark was born in Riverside, California. His father, who played one season of basketball at Modesto Junior College, was an elite perimeter defender. Clark attended Centennial High School in Corona for three years before transferring to Etiwanda High in Rancho Cucamonga for his senior year. Under Etiwanda coach David Kleckner, a defensive specialist, he developed into a two-way player who played unselfishly. Clark averaged 18.5 points, 6.4 rebounds and 2.7 assists per game at Etiwanda, and led the Eagles to the CIF Southern Section Open Division regional finals. He signed a national letter of intent to play with UCLA in 2020.

== College career ==
In his freshman year at the University of California, Los Angeles, in 2020–21, Clark was a reserve and averaged 2.5 points and 2.4 rebounds in nine minutes per game for the Bruins. He made the game-winning free throw in an 80–79 win over Arizona State at home in Pauley Pavilion. In the 2021 NCAA tournament, UCLA unexpectedly advanced to the Final Four. Clark helped lead a 14-point comeback in the First Four with a layup, a pair of assists, and an offensive rebound in an 86–80 overtime win over Michigan State. He had a season-high nine rebounds in 18 minutes in an overtime victory over second-seeded Alabama in the Sweet Sixteen.

As a sophomore in 2021–22, Clark missed six games in January and February due to multiple concussions. Playing off the bench, he was named to the Pac-12 All-Defensive Team. He averaged 6.7 points and 3.8 rebounds in 18.1 minutes per game. In the nine games in which he played 20 or more minutes, Clark averaged 11.4 points and 5.6 rebounds. In February, during a three-game span versus Washington State, Washington, and Arizona State, he averaged 19.7 points, making 3 of 8 on 3-pointers, and added 8.3 rebounds and 2.7 steals. According to UCLA head coach Mick Cronin, "With consistent minutes, you’re going to see him produce a lot more on the offensive end".

Clark became a full-time starter in his junior year in 2022–23 after Johnny Juzang and Jules Bernard departed. In the Bruins' season opener, he scored 17 points on 7-of-7 shooting and had seven steals in a win over Sacramento State. In the regular season finale against Arizona, he suffered a right Achilles tendon rupture and was ruled out for the 2023 Pac-12 tournament. The top-seeded Bruins advanced to the tournament finals, before losing 61–59 to No. 2-seed Arizona. UCLA, who was vying for a No. 1 seed in the 2023 NCAA tournament, received a No. 2 seed in the West Region, but Clark was ruled out for the season. He underwent surgery three days after the injury. The Bruins lost in the Sweet Sixteen to Gonzaga, with an injured Adem Bona also missing the game for UCLA. Clark averaged 2.6 steals per game during the season, which led the Pac-12 and ranked fourth in the nation. One of the top defensive players in the country, he won the Naismith Defensive Player of the Year Award, and the National Association of Basketball Coaches named him their defensive player of the year. Voted the Pac-12 Defensive Player of the Year, he was selected again to the conference's all-defensive team, and was also named second-team All-Pac-12. Clark significantly improved on offense and became UCLA's second-leading scorer. He nearly doubled his scoring from the previous season, averaging 13.0 points, six rebounds and 1.9 assists in 30.5 minutes over 30 games. After the season, he declared for the NBA draft. The timetable for his recovery was estimated to be 8–10 months.

== Professional career ==
Clark was selected by the Minnesota Timberwolves in the second round of the 2023 NBA draft with the 53rd overall pick. On July 7, 2023, he signed a two-way contract with the Timberwolves, and aimed to return to play around the middle or late in the season. On March 28, 2024, he was transferred to the Iowa Wolves of the G League for rehab. Clark played in the 2024 NBA Summer League, his first games since he tore his Achilles.

On February 27, 2025, the Timberwolves announced that they had signed Clark to a standard two-year contract. He made 40 appearances (including four starts) for Minnesota during his rookie season, averaging 4.1 points, 1.3 rebounds, and 0.7 assists.. Clark played in 68 games (starting one) for the Timberwolves during the 2025–26 NBA season, recording averages of 4.0 points, 1.8 rebounds, and 0.6 assists.

On June 26, 2026, Clark re-signed with Minnesota on a three-year, $10 million contract.

== Career statistics ==
Legend
GP	Games played	GS	Games started	MPG	Minutes per game
FG%	Field goal percentage	3P%	3-point field goal percentage	FT%	Free throw percentage
RPG	Rebounds per game	APG	Assists per game	SPG	Steals per game
BPG	Blocks per game	PPG	Points per game	**Bold**	Career high

=== NBA ===
==== Regular season ====
Year	Team	GP	GS	MPG	FG%	3P%	FT%	RPG	APG	SPG	BPG	PPG
2024–25	Minnesota	40	**4**	**13.1**	**.467**	**.431**	**.784**	1.3	**.7**	**.9**	**.1**	**4.1**
2025–26	Minnesota	**68**	1	**13.1**	.434	.327	.657	**1.8**	.6	.7	**.1**	4.0
Career		108	5	13.1	.445	.362	.702	1.6	.6	.8	.1	4.1

==== Playoffs ====
Year	Team	GP	GS	MPG	FG%	3P%	FT%	RPG	APG	SPG	BPG	PPG
2025	Minnesota	5	0	5.6	**.800**	.000	.750	**1.4**	.2	**.4**	.0	**2.2**
2026	Minnesota	**6**	0	**9.5**	.250	**.250**	**1.000**	1.2	**.5**	.2	**.2**	1.7
Career		11	0	7.7	.412	.222	.833	1.3	.4	.3	.1	1.9

=== College ===
Year	Team	GP	GS	MPG	FG%	3P%	FT%	RPG	APG	SPG	BPG	PPG
2020–21	UCLA	**31**	0	9.0	.500	.200	**.750**	2.4	.2	.1	.2	2.5
2021–22	UCLA	29	6	18.1	**.506**	.259	.542	3.8	1.0	1.1	.2	6.7
2022–23	UCLA	30	**29**	**30.5**	.481	**.329**	.698	**6.0**	**1.9**	**2.6**	**.3**	**13.0**
Career		90	35	19.1	.490	.302	.661	4.1	1.0	1.3	.2	7.4
