= 2022–23 California Golden Bears men's basketball team =

Men's basketball team

2022–23 California Golden Bears men's basketball
- Conference: Pac-12 Conference
- Record: 3–29 (2–18 Pac–12)
- Head coach: Mark Fox (4th season)
- Assistant coaches: Andrew Francis; Chris Harriman; Marty Wilson
- Home arena: Haas Pavilion (Capacity: 11,877)

2022–23 Pac-12 Conference men's basketball standings
	Conf.				Overall
Team	W		L	PCT	W		L	PCT
No. 7 UCLA	18	–	2	.900	31	–	6	.838
No. 8 Arizona†	14	–	6	.700	28	–	7	.800
USC	14	–	6	.700	22	–	11	.667
Oregon	12	–	8	.600	21	–	15	.583
Arizona State	11	–	9	.550	23	–	13	.639
Washington State	11	–	9	.550	17	–	17	.500
Utah	10	–	10	.500	17	–	15	.531
Washington	8	–	12	.400	16	–	16	.500
Colorado	8	–	12	.400	18	–	17	.514
Stanford	7	–	13	.350	14	–	19	.424
Oregon State	5	–	15	.250	11	–	21	.344
California	2	–	18	.100	3	–	29	.094
† Conference tournament winner Rankings from AP poll

The 2022–23 California Golden Bears men's basketball team represented the University of California, Berkeley, in the 2022–23 NCAA Division I men's basketball season. This was Mark Fox's fourth and last year as head coach at California. The Golden Bears played their home games at Haas Pavilion as members of the Pac-12 Conference. The team began the season with a record of 0–12, the worst in history for any Power Five team. They finished the season 3–29, 2–18 in Pac-12 play to finish in last place. They lost to Washington State in the first round of the Pac-12 tournament.

Head coach Mark Fox was fired on March 9, 2023. He finished with a 38–87 record at Cal along with a 17–61 record in Pac-12 Conference play. On April 3, the school named Utah Valley head coach and former Stanford player Mark Madsen the team's new head coach.

== Previous season ==
The Golden Bears finished the 2021–22 season with a record of 12–20, 5–15 in Pac-12 play to finish in 10th place. They lost to Washington State in the first round of the Pac-12 tournament.

== Off-season ==
=== Departures ===
Departures
Name	Pos.	Height	Weight	Year	Hometown	Reason for departure
Dimitrios Klonaras	G	6'6"	215	Junior	Thessaloniki, Greece	Elected to transfer; transferred to Cal State East Bay
Andre Kelly	G	6'9"	255	Senior	Stockton, California	Graduated and transferred to UC Santa Barbara
Logan Alters	G	6'1"	185	Junior	Miami, Florida	Walk-on; transferred
D. J. Thrope	F	6'9"	235	Junior	Lake Travis, Texas	Retired from basketball due to an injury
Blake Welle	F	6'8"	213	(redshirt) Junior	Santa Cruz, California	Walk-on; not on the roster

=== Incoming transfers ===
Incoming transfers
Name	Pos.	Height	Weight	Year	Hometown	Previous school
Devin Askew	G	6'3"	195	Junior	Sacramento, CA	Texas
Dejuan Clayton	G	6'2"	185	GS senior	Bowie, MD	Hartford

=== 2022 recruiting class ===
College recruiting
Name	Hometown	School	Height	Weight	Commit date
Grant Newell; SF	Chicago, IL	Whitney Young High School	6 ft 7 in (2.01 m)	185 lb (84 kg)	Nov 10, 2021
Grant Newell; SF	Recruit ratings: Scout: Rivals: 247Sports: ESPN: (76)				
ND Okafor; SF	Dundalk, Ireland	NBA Academy Latin America	6 ft 9 in (2.06 m)	210 lb (95 kg)	Oct 21, 2021
ND Okafor; SF	Recruit ratings: Scout: Rivals: 247Sports: ESPN: (NR)				
Overall recruit ranking:
Note: In many cases, Scout, Rivals, 247Sports, On3, and ESPN may conflict in their listings of height and weight.; In these cases, the average was taken. ESPN grades are on a 100-point scale.; Sources: "2022 California Commits". Rivals.; "2022 Team Ranking". Rivals.

== Roster ==
2022–23 California Golden Bears men's basketball team
Players
Coaches

Pos.	#	Name	Height	Weight	Year	Previous school	Hometown
G	0	Marsalis Roberson	6 ft 6 in (1.98 m)	200 lb (91 kg)	So	Bishop O'Dowd HS	Oakland, California
G	1	Joel Brown	6 ft 3 in (1.91 m)	192 lb (87 kg)	Sr	Brewster Academy	Brampton, Ontario
F	2	Monty Bowser	6 ft 7 in (2.01 m)	195 lb (88 kg)	RS So	Bishop O'Dowd HS	Oakland, California
G	3	Jarred Hyder	6 ft 3 in (1.91 m)	185 lb (84 kg)	Sr	Fresno State	San Bernardino, California
G	10	Josh Ragsdale	6 ft 4 in (1.93 m)	190 lb (86 kg)	Fr	JSerra Catholic High School	San Juan Capistrano, California
G	12	Jack McCloskey	6 ft 4 in (1.93 m)	180 lb (82 kg)	Fr	Mater Dei High School	Newport Beach, California
F	13	Kuany Kuany	6 ft 9 in (2.06 m)	194 lb (88 kg)	Sr	Prolific Prep	Melbourne, Australia
F	14	Grant Newell	6 ft 8 in (2.03 m)	220 lb (100 kg)	Fr	IMG Academy (FL)	Chicago, Illinois
F/C	21	Lars Thiemann	7 ft 1 in (2.16 m)	260 lb (118 kg)	Sr	Bayer Giants U19	Krefeld, Germany
F	22	ND Okafor	6 ft 9 in (2.06 m)	235 lb (107 kg)	Fr	NBA Academy Latin America	Dundalk, Ireland
F	23	Obinna Anyanwu	6 ft 7 in (2.01 m)	225 lb (102 kg)	So	Cathedral Catholic HS	San Diego, California
F	24	Sam Alajiki	6 ft 7 in (2.01 m)	230 lb (104 kg)	So	St. Benedict's Prep	Dundalk, Ireland
G	30	Wrenn Robinson	6 ft 2 in (1.88 m)	185 lb (84 kg)	RS So	St. Ignatius College Preparatory; City College of San Francisco	Oakland, California
G	32	Jalen Celestine	6 ft 7 in (2.01 m)	215 lb (98 kg)	Jr	Long Island Lutheran HS	Ajax, Ontario
G	33	Dejuan Clayton	6 ft 2 in (1.88 m)	190 lb (86 kg)	GS	Hartford	Bowie, Maryland
G	55	Devin Askew	6 ft 3 in (1.91 m)	198 lb (90 kg)	Jr	Texas	Sacramento, California

Head coach

- Mark Fox (Eastern New Mexico)

Assistant coach(es)

- Andrew Francis (Villanova)
- Chris Harriman (Augusta State)
- Marty Wilson (Pepperdine)

Legend

- (C) Team captain
- (S) Suspended
- (I) Ineligible
- (W) Walk-on
- Injured
- Current redshirt

Roster

== Schedule and results ==
The Golden Bears were the first men's basketball team from a power conference—defined for this purpose as a member of a Power Five conference or the Big East Conference—to start a season 0–7 (started 0–12) in the last 40 years. Louisville would match this feat three days later. Cal's record eventually dropped to 3–29.

Main source:

Date time, TV	Rank^{#}	Opponent^{#}	Result	Record	High points	High rebounds	High assists	Site (attendance) city, state
Exhibition
November 2, 2022*; 7:00 p.m.		Chico State	W 62–55		11 – Tied	10 – Thiemann	2 – Tied	Haas Pavilion (1,539); Berkeley, CA
Regular season
November 7, 2022*; 8:00 p.m., P12N		UC Davis	L 65–75	0–1	19 – Askew	8 – Thiemann	4 – Askew	Haas Pavilion (3,128); Berkeley, CA
November 11, 2022*; 4:00 p.m., P12N		Kansas State	L 54–63	0–2	17 – Askew	5 – Tied	5 – Brown	Haas Pavilion (3,607); Berkeley, CA
November 15, 2022*; 7:00 p.m., ESPN+		at UC San Diego	L 62–64	0–3	13 – Askew	5 – Tied	4 – Askew	RIMAC Arena (3,071); San Diego, CA
November 18, 2022*; 6:00 p.m., P12N		Southern; Emerald Coast Classic Campus site game	L 66–74	0–4	21 – Askew	8 – Roberson	5 – Askew	Haas Pavilion (1,364); Berkeley, CA
November 21, 2022*; 8:00 p.m., P12N		Texas State	L 55–59	0–5	17 – Askew	11 – Thiemann	4 – Tied	Haas Pavilion (1,211); Berkeley, CA
November 25, 2022*; 6:30 p.m., CBSSN		vs. TCU; Emerald Coast Classic semifinal	L 48–59	0–6	12 – Tied	8 – Thiemann	3 – Askew	The Arena at NFSC (1,700); Niceville, FL
November 26, 2022*; 1:00 p.m., FloHoops		vs. Clemson; Emerald Coast Classic	L 59–67	0–7	18 – Askew	5 – Thiemann	4 – Brown	The Arena at NFSC (1,100); Niceville, FL
November 30, 2022; 7:00 p.m., P12N		USC	L 51–66	0–8 (0–1)	23 – Askew	6 – Tied	2 – Tied	Haas Pavilion (3,648); Berkeley, CA
December 4, 2022; 2:00 p.m., P12N		at No. 4 Arizona	L 68–81	0–9 (0–2)	25 – Askew	5 – Tied	3 – Tied	McKale Center (14,352); Tucson, AZ
December 7, 2022*; 7:00 p.m., P12N		Eastern Washington	L 48–50	0–10	16 – Thiemann	8 – Brown	5 – Brown	Haas Pavilion (1,297); Berkeley, CA
December 10, 2022*; 2:00 p.m., P12N		Butler	L 58–82	0–11	17 – Tied	10 – Thiemann	3 – Brown	Haas Pavilion (2,040); Berkeley, CA
December 18, 2022*; 2:00 p.m., WCC Network		at Santa Clara	L 62–71	0–12	13 – Brown	6 – Thiemann	6 – Brown	Leavey Center (1,290); Santa Clara, CA
December 21, 2022*; 4:00 p.m., P12N		UT Arlington	W 73–51	1–12	17 – Tied	6 – Tied	4 – Kuany	Haas Pavilion (1,130); Berkeley, CA
December 29, 2022; 7:00 p.m., P12N		Utah	L 43–58	1–13 (0–3)	12 – Kuany	8 – Kuany	2 – Askew	Haas Pavilion (1,468); Berkeley, CA
December 31, 2022; 3:00 p.m., P12N		Colorado	W 80–76	2–13 (1–3)	21 – Brown	12 – Newell	3 – Tied	Haas Pavilion (1,253); Berkeley, CA
January 6, 2023; 6:00 p.m., ESPNU		Stanford	W 92–70	3–13 (2–3)	26 – Clayton	5 – Kuany	6 – Tied	Haas Pavilion (3,648); Berkeley, CA
January 11, 2023; 8:00 p.m., ESPNU		at Washington State	L 51–66	3–14 (2–4)	7 – Tied	7 – Thiemann	4 – Tied	Beasley Coliseum (3,208); Pullman, WA
January 14, 2022; 3:00 p.m., P12N		at Washington	L 78–81^{OT}	3–15 (2–5)	21 – Newell	10 – Newell	5 – Brown	Alaska Airlines Arena (6,297); Seattle, WA
January 18, 2023; 7:00 p.m., P12N		Oregon	L 58–87	3–16 (2–6)	9 – Tied	7 – Thiemann	1 – Tied	Haas Pavilion (2,341); Berkeley, CA
January 22, 2023; 12:00 p.m., P12N		Oregon State	L 48–68	3–17 (2–7)	15 – Kuany	7 – Thiemann	7 – Askew	Haas Pavilion (2,072); Berkeley, CA
January 28, 2023; 7:00 p.m., ESPNU		at Stanford	L 46–76	3–18 (2–8)	13 – Alajiki	9 – Alajiki	3 – Clayton	Maples Pavilion (5,112); Stanford, CA
February 2, 2023; 7:00 p.m., P12N		at Colorado	L 46–59	3–19 (2–9)	10 – Kuany	6 – Newell	3 – Brown	CU Events Center (6,712); Boulder, CO
February 5, 2023; 3:00 p.m., ESPNU		at Utah	L 46–61	3–20 (2–10)	12 – Thiemann	7 – Kuany	2 – Tied	Jon M. Huntsman Center (6,731); Salt Lake City, UT
February 9, 2023; 8:00 p.m., P12N		No. 4 Arizona	L 62–85	3–21 (2–11)	12 – Alajiki	8 – Thiemann	5 – Brown	Haas Pavilion (3,289); Berkeley, CA
February 11, 2023; 5:00 p.m., P12N		Arizona State	L 62–70 ^{OT}	3–22 (2–12)	14 – Tied	8 – Kuany	7 – Brown	Haas Pavilion (2,088); Berkeley, CA
February 16, 2023; 8:00 p.m., FS1		at USC	L 60–97	3–23 (2–13)	13 – Bowser	5 – Kuany	3 – Bowser	Galen Center (3,698); Los Angeles, CA
February 18, 2023; 7:30 p.m., P12N		at No. 4 UCLA	L 43–78	3–24 (2–14)	14 – Kuany	6 – Newell	1 – Tied	Pauley Pavilion (13,659); Los Angeles, CA
February 23, 2023; 6:00 p.m., P12N		Washington	L 55–65	3–25 (2–15)	13 – Alajiki	8 – Kuany	4 – Kuany	Haas Pavilion (1,329); Berkeley, CA
February 25, 2023; 2:00 p.m., P12N		Washington State	L 57–63	3–26 (2–16)	13 – Brown	9 – Kuany	9 – Brown	Haas Pavilion (1,725); Berkeley, CA
March 2, 2023; 8:00 p.m., FS1		at Oregon	L 51–84	3–27 (2–17)	11 – Alajiki	3 – Tied	3 – Brown	Matthew Knight Arena (5,908); Eugene, OR
March 4, 2023; 5:00 p.m., P12N		at Oregon State	L 66–69	3–28 (2–18)	22 – Brown	4 – Tied	4 – Brown	Gill Coliseum (3,390); Corvallis, OR
Pac-12 tournament
March 8, 2023; 2:30 p.m., P12N	(12)	vs. (5) Washington State; First round	L 52–69	3–29	19 – Bowser	6 – Brown	4 – Brown	T-Mobile Arena (7,469); Paradise, NV
*Non-conference game. ^{#}Rankings from AP Poll. (#) Tournament seedings in parentheses. All times are in Pacific Time.
