= 2022–23 Utah Utes men's basketball team =

American college basketball season

2022–23 Utah Utes men's basketball
- Conference: Pac-12 Conference
- Record: 17–15 (10–10 Pac-12)
- Head coach: Craig Smith (2nd season)
- Assistant coaches: Chris Burgess; Tim Morris; DeMarlo Slocum
- Home arena: Jon M. Huntsman Center

2022–23 Pac-12 Conference men's basketball standings
	Conf.				Overall
Team	W		L	PCT	W		L	PCT
No. 7 UCLA	18	–	2	.900	31	–	6	.838
No. 8 Arizona†	14	–	6	.700	28	–	7	.800
USC	14	–	6	.700	22	–	11	.667
Oregon	12	–	8	.600	21	–	15	.583
Arizona State	11	–	9	.550	23	–	13	.639
Washington State	11	–	9	.550	17	–	17	.500
Utah	10	–	10	.500	17	–	15	.531
Washington	8	–	12	.400	16	–	16	.500
Colorado	8	–	12	.400	18	–	17	.514
Stanford	7	–	13	.350	14	–	19	.424
Oregon State	5	–	15	.250	11	–	21	.344
California	2	–	18	.100	3	–	29	.094
† Conference tournament winner Rankings from AP poll

The 2022–23 Utah Runnin' Utes men's basketball team represented the University of Utah during the 2022–23 NCAA Division I men's basketball season. The team was led by second-year head coach Craig Smith. They played their home games at the Jon M. Huntsman Center in Salt Lake City, Utah as members of the Pac-12 Conference. The Utes finished the season 17–14, 10–10 in Pac-12 play to finish in 7th place. They lost in the first round of the Pac-12 tournament to Stanford.

== Previous season ==
The Utes finished the 2021–22 season 11–20, 4–16 in Pac-12 play to finish in 11th place. They lost in the first round of the Pac-12 tournament to Washington.

== Offseason ==
=== Departures ===
Name	Num	Pos.	Height	Weight	Year	Hometown	Reason for departure
Lahat Thioune	0	C	6'10"	228	RS junior	Dakar, Sengal	Transferred to UCF
David Jenkins Jr.	1	G	6'1"	204	RS senior	Tacoma, WA	Graduated & transferred to Purdue
Both Gach	2	G	6'6"	189	Senior	Austin, MN	Graduated/undrafted in 2022 NBA draft
Riley Battin	11	F	6'9"	230	Senior	Westlake Village, CA	Graduated & transferred to California Baptist
Dusan Mahorcic	21	F	6'10"	226	Senior	Belgrade, Serbia	Dismissed from the team due to violation of team rules; transferred to NC State
Jake Jamele	31	G	6'6"	174	Sophomore	Palo Verdes, CA	Walk-on; transferred
Harrison Creer	34	G	6'4"	234	RS freshman	Holladay, UT	Walk-on; no longer on team roster

=== Incoming transfers ===
Name	Num	Pos.	Height	Weight	Year	Hometown	Previous school
Gavin Baxter	0	F	6'9"	228	GS senior	Provo, UT	BYU
Ben Carlson	1	F	6'9"	226	Junior	Woodbury, MN	Wisconsin
Mike Saunders Jr.	2	G	6'0"	184	Junior	Indianapolis, IN	Cincinnati

=== Recruiting classes ===
==== 2022 recruiting class ====
College recruiting
Name	Hometown	School	Height	Weight	Commit date
Keba Keita; C	Mount Pleasant, UT	Wasatch Academy	6 ft 8 in (2.03 m)	225 lb (102 kg)	Apr 13, 2022
Keba Keita; C	Recruit ratings: Scout: Rivals: 247Sports: ESPN: (82)				
Wilguens Exacte Jr. SG	Montreal, QC	NBA Academy Latin America	6 ft 5 in (1.96 m)	200 lb (91 kg)	Apr 14, 2022
Wilguens Exacte Jr. SG	Recruit ratings: Scout: Rivals: 247Sports: ESPN: (NR)				
Luka Tarlać; SF	Serbia	NBA Academy Latin America	6 ft 8 in (2.03 m)	210 lb (95 kg)	Apr 29, 2022
Luka Tarlać; SF	Recruit ratings: Scout: Rivals: 247Sports: ESPN: (NR)				
Overall recruit ranking:
Note: In many cases, Scout, Rivals, 247Sports, On3, and ESPN may conflict in their listings of height and weight.; In these cases, the average was taken. ESPN grades are on a 100-point scale.; Sources: "2022 Utah Basketball Commitment List". Rivals.; "Utah Utes 2022 Player Commits". ESPN.; "2022 Team Ranking". Rivals.

== Roster ==
2022–23 Utah Utes men's basketball team
Players
Coaches

Pos.	#	Name	Height	Weight	Year	Previous school	Hometown
F	0	Gavin Baxter	6 ft 9 in (2.06 m)	224 lb (102 kg)	Sr	BYU	Provo, Utah
F	1	Ben Carlson	6 ft 9 in (2.06 m)	235 lb (107 kg)	Jr	Wisconsin	Woodbury, Minnesota
G	2	Mike Saunders Jr.	6 ft 0 in (1.83 m)	184 lb (83 kg)	Jr	Cincinnati	Indianapolis, Indiana
F	3	Bostyn Holt	6 ft 6 in (1.98 m)	193 lb (88 kg)	Sr	Coffeyville CC	Portland, Oregon
G	5	Jaxon Brenchley	6 ft 5 in (1.96 m)	195 lb (88 kg)	Sr	Ridgeline HS	Providence, Utah
G	10	Marco Anthony	6 ft 5 in (1.96 m)	223 lb (101 kg)	RS Sr	Utah State	San Antonio, Texas
G	11	Wilguens Exacte Jr.	6 ft 6 in (1.98 m)	221 lb (100 kg)	Fr	NBA Academy Latin America	Montreal, Quebec
C	13	Keba Keita	6 ft 8 in (2.03 m)	230 lb (104 kg)	Fr	Wasatch Academy	Mali, West Africa
G	20	Lazar Stefanović	6 ft 7 in (2.01 m)	185 lb (84 kg)	So	Sportska gimnazija	Belgrade, Serbia
G	21	Luka Tarlać	6 ft 7 in (2.01 m)	211 lb (96 kg)	Fr	International School of Belgrade	Belgrade, Serbia
G	25	Rollie Worster	6 ft 4 in (1.93 m)	203 lb (92 kg)	Jr	Utah State	Missoula, Montana
G	32	Eli Ballstaedt (W)	6 ft 5 in (1.96 m)	198 lb (90 kg)	Sr	Wasatch HS	Midway, Utah
C	35	Branden Carlson	7 ft 0 in (2.13 m)	221 lb (100 kg)	Sr	Bingham HS	South Jordan, Utah
G	55	Gabe Madsen	6 ft 6 in (1.98 m)	193 lb (88 kg)	Jr	Cincinnati	Rochester, Minnesota

Head coach

- Craig Smith (North Dakota)

Assistant coach(es)

- Chris Burgess (Utah)
- Tim Morris (Stanford)
- DeMarlo Slocum (Georgia Southern)

Legend

- (C) Team captain
- (S) Suspended
- (I) Ineligible
- (W) Walk-on
- Injured
- Current redshirt

Roster

== Schedule and results ==
Date time, TV	Rank^{#}	Opponent^{#}	Result	Record	High points	High rebounds	High assists	Site (attendance) city, state
Exhibition
November 2, 2022*; 6:00 p.m., P12N		Westminster (UT)	W 93–58		13 – Worster	7 – Worster	4 – Tied	Jon M. Huntsman Center (2,009); Salt Lake City, UT
Regular season
November 7, 2022*; 9:00 p.m., P12N		LIU	W 89–48	1–0	21 – Br. Carlson	11 – Be. Carlson	4 – Stefanović	Jon M. Huntsman Center (5,878); Salt Lake City, UT
November 11, 2022*; 5:00 p.m., P12N		Cal State Bakersfield	W 72–44	2–0	25 – Madsen	7 – Be. Carlson	6 – Worster	Jon M. Huntsman Center (6,283); Salt Lake City, UT
November 14, 2022*; 6:00 p.m., P12N		Idaho State	W 70–56	3–0	26 – Br. Carlson	9 – Br. Carlson	3 – Madsen	Jon M. Huntsman Center (6,328); Salt Lake City, UT
November 17, 2022*; 7:00 p.m., P12N		Sam Houston; Fort Myers Tip-Off campus site game	L 55–65	3–1	14 – Worster	7 – Tied	5 – Worster	Jon M. Huntsman Center (5,503); Salt Lake City, UT
November 21, 2022*; 4:00 p.m., FS1		vs. Georgia Tech; Fort Myers Tip-Off semifinals	W 68–64	4–1	16 – Madsen	9 – Be. Carlson	4 – Madsen	Suncoast Credit Union Arena (1,188); Fort Myers, FL
November 23, 2022*; 6:30 p.m., FS1		vs. Mississippi State; Fort Myers Tip-Off championship	L 49–52	4–2	10 – Tied	9 – Worster	3 – Worster	Suncoast Credit Union Arena (1,144); Fort Myers, FL
November 26, 2022*; 6:00 p.m., P12N		St. Thomas (MN)	W 95–66	5–2	15 – Madsen	7 – Br. Carlson	7 – Worster	Jon M. Huntsman Center (5,109); Salt Lake City, UT
December 1, 2022; 6:30 p.m., P12N		No. 4 Arizona	W 81–66	6–2 (1–0)	22 – Br. Carlson	11 – Tied	9 – Worster	Jon M. Huntsman Center (6,495); Salt Lake City, UT
December 4, 2022; 2:00 p.m., ESPNU		at Washington State	W 67–65	7–2 (2–0)	19 – Worster	10 – Br. Carlson	4 – Tied	Beasley Coliseum (2,009); Pullman, WA
December 8, 2022*; 8:00 p.m., P12N		Jacksonville State	W 99–58	8–2	20 – Stefanović	5 – Worster	8 – Worster	Jon M. Huntsman Center (5,295); Salt Lake City, UT
December 13, 2022*; 7:00 p.m., P12N		UTSA	W 91–70	9–2	27 – Br. Carlson	10 – Anthony	4 – Anthony	Jon M. Huntsman Center (5,223); Salt Lake City, UT
December 17, 2022*; 4:00 p.m., CBSSN		at BYU; Rivalry	L 66–75	9–3	20 – Br. Carlson	6 – Tied	5 – Worster	Marriott Center (14,355); Provo, UT
December 21, 2022*; 7:00 p.m., P12N		vs. No. 20 TCU	L 71–75	9–4	26 – Madsen	10 – Anthony	4 – Worster	Vivint Arena (7,202); Salt Lake City, UT
December 29, 2022; 8:00 p.m., P12N		at California	W 58–43	10–4 (3–0)	11 – Tied	7 – Tied	3 – Anthony	Haas Pavilion (1,468); Berkeley, CA
December 31, 2022; 2:00 p.m., P12N		at Stanford	W 71–66	11–4 (4–0)	20 – Stefanović	8 – Worster	4 – Madsen	Maples Pavilion (2,759); Stanford, CA
January 5, 2023; 8:00 p.m., P12N		Oregon State	W 79–60	12–4 (5–0)	27 – Bra. Carlson	12 – Anthony	8 – Worster	Jon M. Huntsman Center (6,471); Salt Lake City, UT
January 7, 2023; 5:00 p.m., P12N		Oregon	L 60–70	12–5 (5–1)	15 – Anthony	10 – Anthony	7 – Worster	Jon M. Huntsman Center (8,235); Salt Lake City, UT
January 12, 2023; 9:00 p.m., P12N		at No. 7 UCLA	L 49–68	12–6 (5–2)	12 – Worster	4 – Tied	3 – Saunders	Pauley Pavilion (11,771); Los Angeles, CA
January 14, 2023; 8:30 p.m., P12N		at USC	L 56–71	12–7 (5–3)	21 – Br. Carlson	9 – Br. Carlson	3 – Tied	Galen Center (4,671); Los Angeles, CA
January 19, 2023; 7:00 p.m., P12N		Washington State	W 77–63	13–7 (6–3)	28 – Br. Carlson	8 – Br. Carlson	7 – Worster	Jon M. Huntsman Center (6,599); Salt Lake City, UT
January 21, 2023; 6:00 p.m., P12N		Washington	W 86-61	14-7 (7-3)	25 – Carlson	10 – Anthony	10 – Worster	Jon M. Huntsman Center (7,815); Salt Lake City, UT
January 26, 2023; 9:00 p.m., P12N		at Oregon State	W 63–44	15–7 (8–3)	13 – Madsen	6 – Tied	7 – Worster	Gill Coliseum (3,252); Corvallis, OR
January 28, 2023; 6:00 p.m., P12N		at Oregon	L 56–68	15–8 (8–4)	14 – Stefanović	8 – Br. Carlson	6 – Worster	Matthew Knight Arena (8,228); Eugene, OR
February 2, 2023; 6:00 p.m., P12N		Stanford	L 70–77	15–9 (8–5)	26 – Stefanović	7 – Tied	9 – Worster	Jon M. Huntsman Center (7,318); Salt Lake City, UT
February 5, 2023; 4:00 p.m., ESPNU		California	W 61–46	16–9 (9–5)	15 – Stefanović	12 – Bra. Carlson	6 – Stefanović	Jon M. Huntsman Center (6,731); Salt Lake City, UT
February 11, 2023; 8:00 p.m., FS1		Colorado	W 73–62	17–9 (10–5)	17 – Tied	8 – Tied	6 – Worster	Jon M. Huntsman Center (6,133); Salt Lake City, UT
February 16, 2023; 8:00 p.m., P12N		at No. 8 Arizona	L 62–88	17–10 (10–6)	19 – Bra. Carlson	8 – Be. Carlson	4 – Worster	McKale Center (14,688); Tucson, AZ
February 18, 2023; 4:00 p.m., P12N		at Arizona State	L 59–67	17–11 (10–7)	12 – Tied	8 – Tied	3 – Anthony	Desert Financial Arena (8,046); Tempe, AZ
February 23, 2023; 8:30 p.m., FS1		No. 4 UCLA	L 71–78	17–12 (10–8)	25 – Saunders	12 – Anthony	4 – Br. Carlson	Jon M. Huntsman Center (8,497); Salt Lake City, UT
February 25, 2023; 6:00 p.m., ESPNU		USC	L 49–62	17–13 (10–9)	11 – Anthony	10 – Br. Carlson	3 – Tied	Jon M. Huntsman Center (10,134); Salt Lake City, UT
March 4, 2023; 3:30 p.m., P12N		at Colorado	L 60–69	17–14 (10–10)	13 – Br. Carlson	10 – Br. Carlson	5 – Stefanović	CU Events Center (8,432); Boulder, CO
Pac-12 tournament
March 8, 2023; 7:00 p.m., P12N	(7)	vs. (10) Stanford; First round	L 62–73	17–15	27 – Br. Carlson	10 – Br. Carlson	4 – Stefanović	T-Mobile Arena (8,810); Paradise, NV
*Non-conference game. ^{#}Rankings from AP Poll. (#) Tournament seedings in parentheses. All times are in Mountain Time.
