= 2022–23 Oregon State Beavers men's basketball team =

American college basketball season

2022–23 Oregon State Beavers men's basketball
- Conference: Pac-12 Conference
- Record: 11–21 (5–15 Pac-12)
- Head coach: Wayne Tinkle (9th season)
- Associate head coach: Eric Reveno (1st season)
- Assistant coaches: Marlon Stewart (4th season); Tim Shelton (1st season)
- Home arena: Gill Coliseum

2022–23 Pac-12 Conference men's basketball standings
	Conf.				Overall
Team	W		L	PCT	W		L	PCT
No. 7 UCLA	18	–	2	.900	31	–	6	.838
No. 8 Arizona†	14	–	6	.700	28	–	7	.800
USC	14	–	6	.700	22	–	11	.667
Oregon	12	–	8	.600	21	–	15	.583
Arizona State	11	–	9	.550	23	–	13	.639
Washington State	11	–	9	.550	17	–	17	.500
Utah	10	–	10	.500	17	–	15	.531
Washington	8	–	12	.400	16	–	16	.500
Colorado	8	–	12	.400	18	–	17	.514
Stanford	7	–	13	.350	14	–	19	.424
Oregon State	5	–	15	.250	11	–	21	.344
California	2	–	18	.100	3	–	29	.094
† Conference tournament winner Rankings from AP poll

The 2022–23 Oregon State Beavers men's basketball team represented Oregon State University in the 2022–23 NCAA Division I men's basketball season. The Beavers are led by ninth-year head coach Wayne Tinkle, and played their home games at Gill Coliseum in Corvallis, Oregon as members of the Pac-12 Conference.

== Previous season ==
The Beavers finished the 2021–22 season 3–28, 1–19 in Pac-12 play to finish in last place. They lost to Oregon in the first round of the Pac-12 tournament.

== Off-season ==
=== Departures ===
Name	Num	Pos.	Height	Weight	Year	Hometown	Reason for departure
Gianni Hunt	0	G	6'4"	190	Junior	Lakewood, CA	Transferred to Sacramento State
Maurice Calloo	1	F	6'10"	220	Senior	Windsor, ON	Graduated
Jarod Lucas	2	G	6'4"	195	Junior	Hacienda Heights, CA	Transferred to Nevada
Tre' Williams	4	G	6'6"	200	Junior	Dallas, TX	Transferred to Tulane
Xzavier Malone-Key	5	G	6'4"	200	RS Senior	Philadelphia, PA	Graduated
Warith Alatishe	10	F	6'8"	210	Senior	Dallas, TX	Graduated
Roman Silva	12	C	7'1"	265	RS Senior	Rancho Cucamonga, CA	Graduated
Dashawn Davis	13	G	6'2"	185	Junior	Bronx, NY	Transferred to Mississippi State
Dyshawn Hobson	14	G	6'2"	190	Junior	Corvallis, OR	Walk-on; didn't return
Jack Cherry	23	G	6'5"	185	Freshman	Reno, NV	Walk-on; didn't return
Isaiah Johnson	24	F	6'6"	215	Sophomore	Torrance, CA	Transferred to Portland State
Ahmad Rand	44	F	6'8"	200	RS Junior	Lincolnton, GA	Transferred to Milwaukee

=== Incoming transfers ===
Name	Num	Pos.	Height	Weight	Year	Hometown	Previous School
Christian Wright	1	G	6'3"	185	Sophomore	Alpharetta, GA	Georgia
Justin Rochelin	5	G	6'4"	190	Sophomore	Encino, CA	Arizona State
Dzmitry Ryuny	11	F	6'9"	205	Senior	Minsk, Belarus	San Francisco

=== 2022 recruiting class ===
College recruiting
Name	Hometown	School	Height	Weight	Commit date
Jordan Pope #27 SG	Napa, CA	Prolific Prep	6 ft 1 in (1.85 m)	185 lb (84 kg)	Mar 30, 2022
Jordan Pope #27 SG	Recruit ratings: Scout: Rivals: 247Sports: ESPN: (81)				
Nick Krass #67 SG	Biloxi, MS	St. Patrick Catholic High School	6 ft 3 in (1.91 m)	190 lb (86 kg)	Mar 22, 2022
Nick Krass #67 SG	Recruit ratings: Scout: Rivals: 247Sports: ESPN: (78)				
Tyler Bilodeau; PF	Kennewick, WA	Kamiakin High School	6 ft 8 in (2.03 m)	205 lb (93 kg)	Oct 27, 2021
Tyler Bilodeau; PF	Recruit ratings: Scout: Rivals: 247Sports: ESPN: (NR)				
Michael Rataj; SF	Augsburg, Germany	Orange Academy	6 ft 8 in (2.03 m)	215 lb (98 kg)	Nov 22, 2021
Michael Rataj; SF	Recruit ratings: Scout: Rivals: 247Sports: ESPN: (NR)				
Jayden Stevens; PF	Spokane, WA	Spokane Prep Academy	6 ft 7 in (2.01 m)	190 lb (86 kg)	Feb 22, 2022
Jayden Stevens; PF	Recruit ratings: Scout: Rivals: 247Sports: ESPN: (NR)				
KC Ibekwe; C	Coquitlam, BC	Centennial Secondary School	6 ft 10 in (2.08 m)	N/A	Aug 16, 2022
KC Ibekwe; C	Recruit ratings: Scout: Rivals: 247Sports: ESPN: (NR)				
Overall recruit ranking:
Note: In many cases, Scout, Rivals, 247Sports, On3, and ESPN may conflict in their listings of height and weight.; In these cases, the average was taken. ESPN grades are on a 100-point scale.; Sources: "2022 Basketball Player Commits". ESPN.; "2022 Team Ranking". Rivals.

== Roster ==
2022–23 Oregon State Beavers men's basketball team
Players
Coaches

Pos.	#	Name	Height	Weight	Year	Previous school	Hometown
G	0	Jordan Pope	6 ft 2 in (1.88 m)	165 lb (75 kg)	Fr	Prolific Prep	Oakley, California
G	1	Christian Wright	6 ft 3 in (1.91 m)	185 lb (84 kg)	Fr	Georgia	Alpharetta, Georgia
G	2	Nick Krass	6 ft 4 in (1.93 m)	190 lb (86 kg)	Fr	St. Patrick Catholic HS	Gulfport, Mississippi
G	4	Dexter Akanno	6 ft 5 in (1.96 m)	210 lb (95 kg)	RS Jr	Marquette	Valencia, California
G	5	Justin Rochelin	6 ft 4 in (1.93 m)	190 lb (86 kg)	So	Arizona State	Encino, California
F	10	Tyler Bilodeau	6 ft 8 in (2.03 m)	205 lb (93 kg)	Fr	Kamiakin HS	Kennewick, Washington
F	11	Dzmitry Ryuny	6 ft 9 in (2.06 m)	205 lb (93 kg)	Sr	San Francisco	Minsk, Belarus
F	12	Michael Rataj	6 ft 9 in (2.06 m)	205 lb (93 kg)	Fr	Ratiopharm Ulm	Augsburg, Germany
F	14	Jayden Stevens	6 ft 7 in (2.01 m)	190 lb (86 kg)	Fr	Gonzaga Prep	Spokane, Washington
C	15	Chol Marial	7 ft 2 in (2.18 m)	235 lb (107 kg)	RS Jr	Maryland	Rumbek, South Sudan
F	23	Felipe Palazzo (W)	6 ft 7 in (2.01 m)	190 lb (86 kg)	Fr	Colegio Nueva Concepción	San Miguel de Tucumán, Argentina
C	24	KC Ibekwe	6 ft 10 in (2.08 m)	—	Fr	Centennial Academy	Coquitlam, British Columbia
F	34	Rodrigue Andela	6 ft 8 in (2.03 m)	250 lb (113 kg)	RS Sr	Kilgore College	Yaoundé, Cameroon
F	35	Glenn Taylor Jr.	6 ft 6 in (1.98 m)	200 lb (91 kg)	So	AZ Compass Prep	Las Vegas, Nevada

Head coach

- Wayne Tinkle (Montana)

Assistant coach(es)

- Eric Reveno (Stanford)
- Marlon Stewart (North Dakota)
- Tim Shelton (San Diego State)

Legend

- (C) Team captain
- (S) Suspended
- (I) Ineligible
- (W) Walk-on
- Injured
- Current redshirt

Roster

== Schedule and results ==
Date time, TV	Rank^{#}	Opponent^{#}	Result	Record	High points	High rebounds	High assists	Site (attendance) city, state
Exhibition
October 29, 2022*; 5:00 p.m.		Lewis & Clark	W 98–49		20 – Akanno	9 – Rataj	5 – Taylor Jr.	Gill Coliseum; Corvallis, OR
Regular season
November 7, 2022*; 9:00 p.m., P12N		Tulsa	W 73–70	1–0	19 – Pope	9 – Andela	3 – Tied	Gill Coliseum (3,320); Corvallis, OR
November 11, 2022*; 6:00 p.m., P12N		Florida A&M	W 60–43	2–0	15 – Akanno	6 – Tied	3 – Tied	Gill Coliseum (4,778); Corvallis, OR
November 15, 2022*; 6:00 p.m., P12N		Bushnell	W 83–66	3–0	19 – Taylor Jr.	8 – Andela	8 – Akanno	Gill Coliseum (2,973); Corvallis, OR
November 19, 2022*; 7:00 p.m., P12N		Portland State	L 66–79	3–1	25 – Taylor Jr.	8 – Ryuny	3 – Akanno	Gill Coliseum (3,482); Corvallis, OR
November 24, 2022*; 12:00 p.m., ESPN		vs. No. 8 Duke; Phil Knight Legacy quarterfinals	L 51–54	3–2	14 – Pope	5 – Tied	2 – Pope	Veterans Memorial Coliseum; Portland, OR
November 25, 2022*; 3:00 p.m., ESPNU		vs. Florida; Phil Knight Legacy consolation round	L 68–81	3–3	12 – Tied	4 – Tied	5 – Pope	Moda Center (6,526); Portland, OR
November 27, 2022*; 8:00 p.m., ESPNU		vs. Portland State; Phil Knight Legacy 7th-place game	L 71–83	3–4	23 – Pope	6 – Rataj	4 – Taylor Jr.	Chiles Center (1,016); Portland, OR
December 1, 2022; 7:00 p.m., ESPNU		Washington	W 66–65	4–4 (1–0)	14 – Ryuny	9 – Ryuny	5 – Tied	Gill Coliseum (3,303); Corvallis, OR
December 4, 2022; 4:00 p.m., P12N		at USC	L 62–63	4–5 (1–1)	17 – Akanno	10 – Ryuny	6 – Akanno	Galen Center (3,273); Los Angeles, CA
December 11, 2022*; 3:00 p.m., ESPN2		at Texas A&M	L 54–72	4–6	13 – Ryuny	6 – Ryuny	6 – Pope	Reed Arena (7,044); College Station, TX
December 15, 2022*; 7:30 p.m., P12N		Seattle	W 73–58	5–6	15 – Pope	12 – Ryuny	4 – Tied	Gill Coliseum (2,537); Corvallis, OR
December 18, 2022*; 12:00 p.m., P12N		Green Bay	W 65–56	6–6	20 – Taylor Jr.	6 – Tied	3 – Tied	Gill Coliseum (2,581); Corvallis, OR
December 21, 2022*; 7:00 p.m., P12N		Denver	W 57–52	7–6	12 – Taylor	9 – Rataj	4 – Taylor	Gill Coliseum (2,617); Corvallis, OR
December 31, 2022; 5:00 p.m., P12N		at Oregon; Rivalry	L 68–77	7–7 (1–2)	20 – Akanno	5 – Bilodeau	2 – Tied	Matthew Knight Arena (7,001); Eugene, OR
January 5, 2023; 7:00 p.m., P12N		at Utah	L 60–79	7–8 (1–3)	11 – Bilodeau	6 – Ryuny	4 – Wright	Jon M. Huntsman Center (6,471); Salt Lake City, UT
January 7, 2023; 6:30 p.m., P12N		at Colorado	L 42–62	7–9 (1–4)	10 – Akanno	12 – Bilodeau	2 – Tied	CU Events Center (6,203); Boulder, CO
January 12, 2023; 8:00 p.m., ESPN2		No. 9 Arizona	L 74–86	7–10 (1–5)	18 – Bilodeau	6 – Bilodeau	4 – Tied	Gill Coliseum (4,126); Corvallis, OR
January 14, 2023; 1:00 p.m., P12N		Arizona State	L 69-74	7–11 (1–6)	17 – Rataj	5 – Tied	3 – Tied	Gill Coliseum (3,789); Corvallis, OR
January 19, 2023; 8:00 p.m., P12N		at Stanford	L 46–67	7–12 (1–7)	11 – Taylor	5 – Pope	2 – Pope	Maples Pavilion (2,782); Stanford, CA
January 22, 2023; 12:00 p.m., P12N		at California	W 68–48	8–12 (2–7)	19 – Pope	4 – Tied	3 – Taylor	Haas Pavilion (2,072); Berkeley, CA
January 26, 2023; 8:00 p.m., P12N		Utah	L 44–63	8–13 (2–8)	11 – Pope	9 – Bilodeau	3 – Taylor	Gill Coliseum (3,252); Corvallis, OR
January 28, 2023; 7:30 p.m., P12N		Colorado	W 60–52	9–13 (3–8)	19 – Pope	12 – Taylor	4 – Taylor	Gill Coliseum (3,789); Corvallis, OR
February 2, 2023; 5:00 p.m., P12N		at Arizona State	L 57–68	9–14 (3–9)	14 – Pope	4 – Andela	3 – Tied	Desert Financial Arena (8,032); Tempe, AZ
February 4, 2023; 6:30 p.m., P12N		at No. 5 Arizona	L 52–84	9–15 (3–10)	11 – Pope	7 – Ibekwe	2 – Rataj	McKale Center (14,688); Tucson, AZ
February 9, 2023; 6:00 p.m., P12N		No. 7 UCLA	L 47–62	9–16 (3–11)	17 – Pope	5 – Rataj	2 – Pope	Gill Coliseum (3,524); Corvallis, OR
February 11, 2023; 3:00 p.m., P12N		USC	W 61–58	10–16 (4–11)	18 – Taylor Jr.	10 – Taylor Jr.	3 – Pope	Gill Coliseum (3,796); Corvallis, OR
February 16, 2023; 8:00 p.m., ESPNU		at Washington State	L 62–80	10–17 (4–12)	18 – Bilodeau	6 – Rataj	3 – Pope	Beasley Coliseum (2,961); Pullman, WA
February 18, 2023; 5:00 p.m., P12N		at Washington	L 47–61	10–18 (4–13)	11 – Tied	7 – Pope	2 – Tied	Alaska Airlines Arena (7,512); Seattle, WA
February 25, 2023; 7:00 p.m., P12N		Oregon; Rivalry	L 67–69	10–19 (4–14)	17 – Akanno	5 – Taylor Jr.	4 – Wright	Gill Coliseum (7,270); Corvallis, OR
March 2, 2023; 6:00 p.m., P12N		Stanford	L 60–83	10–20 (4–15)	11 – Tied	6 – Bilodeau	5 – Rataj	Gill Coliseum (3,122); Corvallis, OR
March 4, 2023; 5:00 p.m., P12N		California	W 69–66	11–20 (5–15)	28 – Taylor	5 – Bilodeau	3 – Tied	Gill Coliseum (3,390); Corvallis, OR
Pac-12 tournament
March 8, 2023; 8:30 p.m., P12N	(11)	vs. (6) Arizona State; First round	L 57–63	11–21	17 – Taylor	7 – Tied	5 – Rataj	T-Mobile Arena (8,810); Paradise, NV
*Non-conference game. ^{#}Rankings from AP Poll. (#) Tournament seedings in parentheses. All times are in Pacific Time.
