= 2022–23 Washington Huskies men's basketball team =

American college basketball season

2022–23 Washington Huskies men's basketball

Wooden Legacy champions
- Conference: Pac-12 Conference
- Record: 16–16 (8–12 Pac-12)
- Head coach: Mike Hopkins (6th season)
- Associate head coach: Will Conroy (8th season)
- Assistant coaches: Wyking Jones (2nd season); Quincy Pondexter (2nd season)
- Home arena: Alaska Airlines Arena

2022–23 Pac-12 Conference men's basketball standings
	Conf.				Overall
Team	W		L	PCT	W		L	PCT
No. 7 UCLA	18	–	2	.900	31	–	6	.838
No. 8 Arizona†	14	–	6	.700	28	–	7	.800
USC	14	–	6	.700	22	–	11	.667
Oregon	12	–	8	.600	21	–	15	.583
Arizona State	11	–	9	.550	23	–	13	.639
Washington State	11	–	9	.550	17	–	17	.500
Utah	10	–	10	.500	17	–	15	.531
Washington	8	–	12	.400	16	–	16	.500
Colorado	8	–	12	.400	18	–	17	.514
Stanford	7	–	13	.350	14	–	19	.424
Oregon State	5	–	15	.250	11	–	21	.344
California	2	–	18	.100	3	–	29	.094
† Conference tournament winner Rankings from AP poll

The 2022–23 Washington Huskies men's basketball team represented the University of Washington in the 2022–23 NCAA Division I men's basketball season. The Huskies, led by sixth-year head coach Mike Hopkins, played their home games at Alaska Airlines Arena at Hec Edmundson Pavilion in Seattle, Washington as members of the Pac-12 Conference. They finished the season 16–15, 8–12 in Pac-12 play to tie for eighth place. They lost in the first round of the Pac-12 tournament to Colorado.

== Previous season ==
The Huskies finished the 2021–22 season 17–15, 11–9 in Pac-12 play to finish in a three-way tie for fifth place. As the No. 6 seed in the Pac-12 tournament, they defeated Utah in the first round before losing to USC in the quarterfinals.

== Offseason ==
=== Departures ===
Washington departures
Name	Number	Pos.	Height	Weight	Year	Hometown	Reason for departure
Emmitt Matthews Jr.	0	F	6'7"	215	Senior	Tacoma, WA	Graduated and transferred to West Virginia
Nate Roberts	1	F	6'11"	265	RS junior	Washington, D.C.	Declared for 2022 NBA draft
Dominiq Penn	10	G	6'2"	170	Sophomore	Columbus, OH	Transferred to Seattle
Daejon Davis	11	G	6'3"	190	GS senior	Seattle, WA	Graduated
Terrell Brown Jr.	23	G	6'3"	185	GS senior	Seattle, WA	Graduated
Jonah Geron	24	G	6'6"	195	RS junior	Fresno, CA	Walk-on; transferred to Fresno Pacific
Noah Neubauer	32	G	6'4"	190	RS junior	Seattle, WA	Walk-on; didn't return
Regan Lundeen	34	F	6'6"	230	Senior	Santa Ana, CA	Walk-on; graduated
Riley Sorn	52	C	7'5"	255	RS junior	Richland, WA	Walk-on; left the team for personal reasons

=== Incoming transfers ===
Washington incoming transfers
Name	Number	Pos.	Height	Weight	Year	Hometown	Previous school
Keion Brooks Jr.	1	F	6'7"	210	Senior	Fort Wayne, IN	Kentucky
Franck Kepnang	11	C	6'11"	250	Junior	Yaoundé, Cameroon	Oregon
Noah Williams	24	G	6'5"	195	Senior	Seattle, WA	Washington State
Braxton Meah	34	C	7'1"	250	Junior	Fresno, CA	Fresno State

=== 2022 recruiting class ===
College recruiting
Name	Hometown	School	Height	Weight	Commit date
Koren Johnson; PG	Seattle, WA	Wasatch Academy	6 ft 2 in (1.88 m)	N/A	Nov 20, 2021
Koren Johnson; PG	Recruit ratings: Rivals: 247Sports: ESPN: (82)				
Tyler Linhardt; PF	Seattle, WA	King's High School	6 ft 7 in (2.01 m)	210 lb (95 kg)	Apr 16, 2021
Tyler Linhardt; PF	Recruit ratings: Rivals: 247Sports: ESPN: (80)				
Keyon Menifield Jr. PG	Flint, MI	PHH Prep	6 ft 2 in (1.88 m)	170 lb (77 kg)	Oct 31, 2021
Keyon Menifield Jr. PG	Recruit ratings: Rivals: 247Sports: ESPN: (NR)				
Overall recruit ranking: Rivals: 38 247Sports: 46
Note: In many cases, Scout, Rivals, 247Sports, On3, and ESPN may conflict in their listings of height and weight.; In these cases, the average was taken. ESPN grades are on a 100-point scale.; Sources: "2022 Washington Commits". Rivals.; "ESPN- Washington Huskies Men's Basketball Recruiting". ESPN.; "2022 Team Ranking". Rivals.

== Roster ==
2022–23 Washington Huskies men's basketball team
Players
Coaches

Pos.	#	Name	Height	Weight	Year	Previous school	Hometown
G	0	Koren Johnson	6 ft 2 in (1.88 m)	175 lb (79 kg)	Fr	Wasatch Academy	Seattle, WA
F	1	Keion Brooks Jr.	6 ft 7 in (2.01 m)	210 lb (95 kg)	Sr	Kentucky	Fort Wayne, IN
G	4	PJ Fuller	6 ft 4 in (1.93 m)	175 lb (79 kg)	Sr	TCU	Seattle, WA
G	5	Jamal Bey	6 ft 6 in (1.98 m)	210 lb (95 kg)	GS	Bishop Gorman	Las Vegas, NV
F	10	Tyler Linhardt	6 ft 7 in (2.01 m)	210 lb (95 kg)	Fr	King's	Seattle, WA
C	11	Franck Kepnang	6 ft 11 in (2.11 m)	250 lb (113 kg)	Jr	Oregon	Yaoundé, Cameroon
F	12	Jackson Grant	6 ft 10 in (2.08 m)	205 lb (93 kg)	So	Olympia	Olympia, WA
F	13	Langston Wilson	6 ft 9 in (2.06 m)	200 lb (91 kg)	Sr	Georgia Highlands College (GA)	Upper Darby, PA
G	14	Kyle Luttinen (W)	6 ft 7 in (2.01 m)	185 lb (84 kg)	Jr	Roosevelt	Seattle, WA
G	15	Griff Hopkins (W)	6 ft 4 in (1.93 m)	185 lb (84 kg)	Jr	Bellevue (WA)	Syracuse, NY
F	21	Samuel Ariyibi	6 ft 8 in (2.03 m)	190 lb (86 kg)	So	NBA Africa Academy	Lagos, Nigeria
G	22	Cole Bajema	6 ft 7 in (2.01 m)	190 lb (86 kg)	Sr	Michigan	Lynden, WA
G	23	Keyon Menifield	6 ft 1 in (1.85 m)	170 lb (77 kg)	Fr	PHH Prep	Flint, MI
G	24	Noah Williams	6 ft 5 in (1.96 m)	195 lb (88 kg)	Sr	Washington State	Seattle, WA
G	30	Anthony Iglesia (W)	5 ft 7 in (1.7 m)	150 lb (68 kg)	Sr	Skagit Valley College	Syracuse, NY
G	33	Sam Slutske (W)	6 ft 2 in (1.88 m)	170 lb (77 kg)	Fr	Crossroads	Santa Monica, CA
C	34	Braxton Meah	7 ft 1 in (2.16 m)	250 lb (113 kg)	Jr	Fresno State	Fresno, CA

Head coach

- Mike Hopkins (Syracuse)
- Will Conroy (associate) (Washington)

Assistant coach(es)

- Wyking Jones (Loyola Marymount)
- Quincy Pondexter (Washington)

Legend

- (C) Team captain
- (S) Suspended
- (I) Ineligible
- (W) Walk-on
- Injured
- Current redshirt

Roster

== Schedule and results ==
Date time, TV	Rank^{#}	Opponent^{#}	Result	Record	High points	High rebounds	High assists	Site (attendance) city, state
Exhibition
November 1, 2022*; 7:00 p.m., P12N		Alaska	W 95–64		19 – Brooks	5 – Williams	10 – Williams	Alaska Airlines Arena (5,199); Seattle, WA
Regular season
November 7, 2022*; 8:00 p.m., P12N		Weber State	W 69–52	1–0	20 – Brooks	8 – Kepnang	4 – Fuller II	Alaska Airlines Arena (6,445); Seattle, WA
November 11, 2022*; 8:00 p.m., P12N		North Florida	W 75–67	2–0	21 – Menifield	11 – Bajema	7 – Fuller II	Alaska Airlines Arena (6,786); Seattle, WA
November 14, 2022*; 7:00 p.m., P12N		Utah Tech	W 78–67	3–0	26 – Menifield	5 – Kepnang	4 – Bey	Alaska Airlines Arena (5,401); Seattle, WA
November 17, 2022*; 8:00 p.m., P12N		Cal Baptist	L 64–73	3–1	14 – Kepnang	8 – Kepnang	3 – Fuller II	Alaska Airlines Arena (5,666); Seattle, WA
November 23, 2022*; 6:30 p.m., ESPNU		vs. Fresno State; Wooden Legacy semifinals	W 62–57	4–1	16 – Brooks	7 – Meah	2 – Tied	Anaheim Convention Center (1,328); Anaheim, CA
November 24, 2022*; 9:30 p.m., ESPN2		vs. Saint Mary's; Wooden Legacy championship	W 68–64 ^{OT}	5–1	14 – Brooks	11 – Brooks	2 – Brooks	Anaheim Convention Center (637); Anaheim, CA
November 28, 2022*; 7:00 p.m., P12N		Seattle	W 77–66	6–1	20 – Brooks	7 – Meah	4 – Bey	Alaska Airlines Arena (7,537); Seattle, WA
December 1, 2022; 7:00 p.m., ESPNU		at Oregon State	L 65–66	6–2 (0–1)	21 – Brooks	7 – Brooks	5 – Menifield	Gill Coliseum (3,303); Corvallis, OR
December 4, 2022; 12:00 p.m., P12N		Colorado	W 73–63	7–2 (1–1)	16 – Tied	7 – Tied	4 – Tied	Alaska Airlines Arena (7,261); Seattle, WA
December 9, 2022*; 6:00 p.m., RTNW+		at No. 18 Gonzaga; Rivalry	L 60–77	7–3	14 – Brooks	6 – Tied	6 – Fuller	McCarthey Athletic Center (6,000); Spokane, WA
December 13, 2022*; 7:30 p.m., P12N		Cal Poly	W 74–68	8–3	30 – Brooks	8 – Meah	3 – Tied	Alaska Airlines Arena (4,888); Seattle, WA
December 17, 2022*; 7:00 p.m., P12N		Idaho State	W 90–55	9–3	13 – Menifield	10 – Brooks	7 – Menifield	Alaska Airlines Arena (5,733); Seattle, WA
December 21, 2022*; 6:00 p.m., P12N		No. 23 Auburn	L 61–84	9–4	15 – Brooks	9 – Meah	3 – Menifield	Alaska Airlines Arena (8,502); Seattle, WA
December 30, 2022; 7:00 p.m., ESPN2		USC	L 67–80	9–5 (1–2)	22 – Brooks	7 – Tied	3 – Tied	Alaska Airlines Arena (7,690); Seattle, WA
January 1, 2023; 4:00 p.m., P12N		No. 11 UCLA	L 49–74	9–6 (1–3)	20 – Meah	7 – Tied	5 – Williams	Alaska Airlines Arena (7,494); Seattle, WA
January 5, 2023; 8:00 p.m., FS1		at No. 5 Arizona	L 67–70	9–7 (1–4)	16 – Tied	9 – Tied	4 – Williams	McKale Center (13,562); Tucson, AZ
January 8, 2023; 2:00 p.m., ESPN		at Arizona State	L 65–73	9–8 (1–5)	15 – Tied	11 – Brooks	7 – Menifield	Desert Financial Arena (7,020); Tempe, AZ
January 12, 2023; 8:00 p.m., FS1		Stanford	W 86–69	10–8 (2–5)	21 – Meah	11 – Brooks	5 – Tied	Alaska Airlines Arena (5,692); Seattle, WA
January 14, 2023; 3:00 p.m., P12N		California	W 81–78 ^{OT}	11–8 (3–5)	26 – Brooks	11 – Meah	3 – Tied	Alaska Airlines Arena (6,297); Seattle, WA
January 19, 2023; 6:00 p.m., ESPNU		at Colorado	W 75–72	12–8 (4–5)	25 – Brooks	12 – Meah	3 – Tied	CU Events Center (6,974); Boulder, CO
January 21, 2023; 5:00 p.m., P12N		at Utah	L 61–86	12–9 (4–6)	17 – Brooks Jr.	9 – Brooks Jr.	3 – Tied	Jon M. Huntsman Center (7,815); Salt Lake City, UT
January 26, 2023; 8:00 p.m., ESPNU		Arizona State	W 69–66 ^{OT}	13–9 (5–6)	22 – Brooks	11 – Meah	5 – Menifield	Alaska Airlines Arena (7,332); Seattle, WA
January 28, 2023; 2:30 p.m., FOX		No. 6 Arizona	L 72–95	13–10 (5–7)	25 – Brooks	6 – Tied	3 – Menifield	Alaska Airlines Arena (9,268); Seattle, WA
February 2, 2023; 6:00 p.m., FS1		at No. 9 UCLA	L 61–70	13–11 (5–8)	23 – Brooks	6 – Tied	4 – Bey	Pauley Pavilion (8,309); Los Angeles, CA
February 4, 2023; 6:30 p.m., FS1		at USC	L 74–80	13–12 (5–9)	22 – Brooks	12 – Brooks	4 – Tied	Galen Center (5,706); Los Angeles, CA
February 11, 2023; 7:30 p.m., P12N		at Washington State; Rivalry	L 51–56	13–13 (5–10)	12 – Williams	10 – Meah	2 – Tied	Beasley Coliseum (5,647); Pullman, WA
February 15, 2023; 8:00 p.m., ESPNU		Oregon	W 72–71 ^{OT}	14–13 (6–10)	27 – Menifield	8 – Meah	7 – Menifield	Alaska Airlines Arena (7,079); Seattle, WA
February 18, 2023; 5:00 p.m., P12N		Oregon State	W 61–47	15–13 (7–10)	15 – Bey	11 – Meah	4 – Menifield	Alaska Airlines Arena (7,512); Seattle, WA
February 23, 2023; 6:00 p.m., P12N		at California	W 65–56	16–13 (8–10)	24 – Brooks	11 – Brooks	5 – Menifield	Haas Pavilion (1,329); Berkeley, CA
February 26, 2023; 3:00 p.m., FS1		at Stanford	L 69–81	16–14 (8–11)	21 – Bey	8 – Tied	3 – Menifield	Maples Pavilion (4,738); Stanford, CA
March 2, 2023; 8:00 p.m., ESPNU		Washington State; Rivalry	L 84–93	16–15 (8–12)	22 – Brooks	6 – Meah	5 – Menifield	Alaska Airlines Arena (9,268); Seattle, WA
PAC-12 Tournament
March 8, 2023; 12:00 p.m., P12N	(8)	vs. (9) Colorado; First round	L 68–74	16–16	16 – Bajema	7 – Bey	7 – Menifield	T-Mobile Arena (7,469); Paradise, NV
*Non-conference game. ^{#}Rankings from AP Poll. (#) Tournament seedings in parentheses. All times are in Pacific Time.

== Rankings ==
Ranking movements
	Week																				
Poll	Pre	1	2	3	4	5	6	7	8	9	10	11	12	13	14	15	16	17	18	19	Final
AP																					Not released
Coaches																					
