= 2022–23 Arizona State Sun Devils men's basketball team =

American college basketball season

2022–23 Arizona State Sun Devils men's basketball

Legends Classic champions

NCAA tournament, First Round
- Conference: Pac-12 Conference
- Record: 23–13 (11–9 Pac–12)
- Head coach: Bobby Hurley (8th season)
- Associate head coach: Jermaine Kimbrough
- Assistant coaches: George Aramide; Brandon Rosenthal
- Home arena: Desert Financial Arena

2022–23 Pac-12 Conference men's basketball standings
	Conf.				Overall
Team	W		L	PCT	W		L	PCT
No. 7 UCLA	18	–	2	.900	31	–	6	.838
No. 8 Arizona†	14	–	6	.700	28	–	7	.800
USC	14	–	6	.700	22	–	11	.667
Oregon	12	–	8	.600	21	–	15	.583
Arizona State	11	–	9	.550	23	–	13	.639
Washington State	11	–	9	.550	17	–	17	.500
Utah	10	–	10	.500	17	–	15	.531
Washington	8	–	12	.400	16	–	16	.500
Colorado	8	–	12	.400	18	–	17	.514
Stanford	7	–	13	.350	14	–	19	.424
Oregon State	5	–	15	.250	11	–	21	.344
California	2	–	18	.100	3	–	29	.094
† Conference tournament winner Rankings from AP poll

The 2022–23 Arizona State Sun Devils men's basketball team represent Arizona State University during the 2022–23 NCAA Division I men's basketball season. The Sun Devils are led by eighth-year head coach Bobby Hurley, and play their home games at Desert Financial Arena in Tempe, Arizona as members of the Pac–12 Conference. In the 2022–2023 season, the Sun Devils went 23-12 overall and 11–9 in Pac-12 play to qualify for the NCAA Tournament where they were an 11 seed. They defeated the University of Nevada to get to the Round of 64 versus TCU. During the regular season, ASU had big wins over #20 Michigan and #7 Arizona, the latter being beaten on a 60-foot buzzer beater by Desmond Cambridge Jr. They finished tied for 5th place in the Pac-12.

== Previous season ==
The 2021–22 Sun Devils finished the season 14–17 overall, and 10–10 in conference play for eighth place. They lost to 9-seed Stanford in the first round of the Pac-12 tournament.

== Off-season ==
=== Departures ===
Name	Pos.	Height	Weight	Year	Hometown	Reason for departure
Marreon Jackson	G	6'1"	190	Graduate Student	Cleveland, Ohio	Completed college eligibility.
Kimani Lawrence	F	6'6"	205	Graduate Student	Providence, Rhode Island	Completed college eligibility.
Jalen Graham	F	6'9"	220	Junior	Phoenix, Arizona	Transferred to Arkansas
Will Felton	F	6'8"	240	Freshman	Raleigh, North Carolina	Transferred to North Carolina A&T
Demari Williams	G/F	6'6"	210	Freshman	Fulshear, Texas	Transferred to Oral Roberts
Justin Rochelin	G	6'4"	190	Freshman	Encino, California	Transferred to Oregon State
Jay Heath	G	6'3"	195	Senior	Washington, D.C.	Transferred to Georgetown

=== Incoming transfers ===
Name	Pos.	Height	Weight	Year	Previous School	Notes
Frankie Collins	G	6'1"	185	So.	Michigan	
Devan Cambridge	F	6'6"	215	Sr.	Auburn	
Desmond Cambridge Jr.	G	6'4"	180	GS	Nevada	
Warren Washington	C	7'0"	215	Sr.	Nevada	

=== 2022 recruiting class ===
College recruiting information
Name	Hometown	School	Height	Weight	Commit date
Duke Brennan; C	Gilbert, AZ	Hillcrest Prep	6 ft 10 in (2.08 m)	235 lb (107 kg)	Aug 25, 2021
Duke Brennan; C	Recruit ratings: Scout: Rivals: 247Sports: ESPN: (81)				
Austin Nunez; G	San Antonio, TX	Wagner HS	6 ft 2 in (1.88 m)	170 lb (77 kg)	Sep 5, 2021
Austin Nunez; G	Recruit ratings: Scout: Rivals: 247Sports: ESPN: (80)				
Overall recruit ranking:
Note: In many cases, Scout, Rivals, 247Sports, On3, and ESPN may conflict in their listings of height and weight.; In these cases, the average was taken. ESPN grades are on a 100-point scale.; Sources:

== Roster ==
2022–23 Arizona State Sun Devils men's basketball team
Players
Coaches

Pos.	#	Name	Height	Weight	Year	Previous school	Hometown
G	0	DJ Horne	6 ft 1 in (1.85 m)	175 lb (79 kg)	Sr	Illinois State	Raleigh, North Carolina
G	1	Luther Muhammad	6 ft 3 in (1.91 m)	195 lb (88 kg)	RS Sr	Ohio State	Newark, New Jersey
G	2	Austin Nunez	6 ft 2 in (1.88 m)	170 lb (77 kg)	Fr	Karen Wagner High School	Garden Ridge, Texas
G	4	Desmond Cambridge Jr.	6 ft 4 in (1.93 m)	180 lb (82 kg)	GS	Nevada	Nashville, Tennessee
G/F	5	Jamiya Neal	6 ft 6 in (1.98 m)	185 lb (84 kg)	So	Phoenix Hillcrest Prep	Toledo, Ohio
G	10	Frankie Collins	6 ft 1 in (1.85 m)	185 lb (84 kg)	So	Michigan	Sacramento, California
G	11	Bobby Hurley (W)	6 ft 0 in (1.83 m)	160 lb (73 kg)	So	Notre Dame Prep	Scottsdale, Arizona
G	12	Micah Burno (W)	6 ft 0 in (1.83 m)	180 lb (82 kg)	Sr	Chaparral HS	Scottsdale, Arizona
C	14	Enoch Boakye	6 ft 10 in (2.08 m)	240 lb (109 kg)	So	George Harris Prep	Brampton, Ontario
F	15	John Olmsted (W)	6 ft 10 in (2.08 m)	235 lb (107 kg)	Sr	Morenci HS	Morenci, Arizona
G	20	Cade Ronzone (W)	6 ft 2 in (1.88 m)	180 lb (82 kg)	Jr	Bishop O'Dowd HS	Oakland, California
C	22	Warren Washington	7 ft 0 in (2.13 m)	225 lb (102 kg)	Sr	Nevada	Escondido, California
F	23	Marcus Bagley (S)	6 ft 8 in (2.03 m)	215 lb (98 kg)	So	Sheldon HS	Phoenix, Arizona
C	24	Duke Brennan	6 ft 10 in (2.08 m)	235 lb (107 kg)	Fr	Phoenix Hillcrest Prep	Gilbert, Arizona
G	25	Jordan Williams (W)	5 ft 10 in (1.78 m)	195 lb (88 kg)	So	AZ Compass Prep	Los Angeles, California
F/C	32	Alonzo Gaffney	6 ft 9 in (2.06 m)	200 lb (91 kg)	Sr	Northwest Florida State College	Cleveland, Ohio
G	33	Malcolm Flaggs (W)	6 ft 6 in (1.98 m)	210 lb (95 kg)	Fr	Phoenix Hillcrest Prep	Chandler, Arizona
G	35	Devan Cambridge	6 ft 6 in (1.98 m)	215 lb (98 kg)	Sr	Auburn	Nashville, Tennessee
G	43	Austin Ronzone (W)	6 ft 1 in (1.85 m)	178 lb (81 kg)	Jr	Bishop O'Dowd HS	Oakland, California

Head coach

- Bobby Hurley (Duke)

Assistant coach(es)

- Jermaine Kimbrough (Virginia Tech)
- George Aramide (Thompson Rivers University)
- Brandon Rosenthal (St. Edward's University)

Legend

- (C) Team captain
- (S) Suspended
- (I) Ineligible
- (W) Walk-on
- Injured
- Current redshirt

Roster

== Schedule and results ==
Date time, TV	Rank^{#}	Opponent^{#}	Result	Record	High points	High rebounds	High assists	Site (attendance) city, state
Regular season
November 7, 2022*; 5:00 p.m., P12N		Tarleton State	W 62–59	1–0	21 – F. Collins	10 – Dev. Cambridge	4 – F. Collins	Desert Financial Arena (6,304); Tempe, AZ
November 10, 2022*; 7:00 p.m., P12N		Northern Arizona	W 82–65	2-0	25 – D. Horne	6 – Tied	8 – F. Collins	Desert Financial Arena (6,925); Tempe, AZ
November 13, 2022*; 1:00 p.m., ESPN+/P12N		at Texas Southern; Pac-12/SWAC Legacy Series	L 66–67 ^{OT}	2–1	23 – F. Collins	14 – W. Washington	3 – Tied	H&PE Arena (3,184); Houston, TX
November 16, 2022*; 6:30 p.m., ESPN+		vs. VCU; Legends Classic semifinals	W 63–59	3–1	15 – F. Collins	7 – Tied	4 – F. Collins	Barclays Center (5,778); Brooklyn, NY
November 17, 2022*; 7:00 p.m., ESPN2		vs. No. 20 Michigan; Legends Classic championship	W 87–62	4–1	20 – Des. Cambridge Jr.	8 – W. Washington	5 – F. Collins	Barclays Center (5,677); Brooklyn, NY
November 22, 2022*; 7:00 p.m., P12N		Grambling State	W 80–49	5–1	16 – Dev. Cambridge	7 – W. Washington	7 – F. Collins	Desert Financial Arena (6,263); Tempe, AZ
November 27, 2022*; 3:00 p.m., P12N		Alcorn State	W 76–54	6–1	14 – Tied	7 – Tied	5 – Tied	Desert Financial Arena (5,263); Tempe, AZ
December 1, 2022; 6:30 p.m., FS1		at Colorado	W 60–59	7–1 (1–0)	18 – Dev. Cambridge	6 – W. Washington	6 – D. Horne	CU Events Center (6,917); Boulder, CO
December 4, 2022; 5:00 p.m., ESPN2		Stanford	W 68–64	8–1 (2–0)	19 – Des. Cambridge	10 – W. Washington	5 – F. Collins	Desert Financial Arena (7,243); Tempe, AZ
December 7, 2022*; 7:00 p.m., ESPNU		at SMU	W 75–57	9–1	22 – D. Horne	7 – Tied	4 – Tied	Moody Coliseum (4,556); University Park, TX
December 12, 2022*; 7:00 p.m., FS1		vs. Creighton; Jack Jones Hoopfest	W 73–71	10–1	19 – Des. Cambridge	11 – W. Washington	6 – F. Collins	Michelob Ultra Arena; Paradise, NV
December 18, 2022*; 5:00 p.m., P12N		San Diego	W 91–67	11–1	23 – Des. Cambridge	11 – Dev. Cambridge	11 – F. Collins	Desert Financial Arena (6,336); Tempe, AZ
December 21, 2022*; 8:00 p.m., CBSSN	No. 25	at San Francisco	L 60–97	11–2	12 – Tied	6 – Tied;	3 – F. Collins	War Memorial Gymnasium (2,756); San Francisco, CA
December 31, 2022; 12:00 p.m., FOX		No. 5 Arizona; Rivalry	L 60–69	11–3 (2–1)	12 – Collins	7 – Washington	6 – Collins	Desert Financial Arena (12,582); Tempe, AZ
January 5, 2023; 6:00 p.m., P12N		Washington State	W 77–71	12–3 (3–1)	18 – Washington	7 – Collins	4 – Washington	Desert Financial Arena (5,860); Tempe, AZ
January 8, 2023; 3:00 p.m., ESPN		Washington	W 73–65	13–3 (4–1)	18 – Dev. Cambridge	12 – Tied	7 – Des. Cambridge	Desert Financial Arena (7,020); Tempe, AZ
January 12, 2023; 7:00 p.m., FS1		at Oregon	W 90–73	14–3 (5–1)	21 – Des. Cambridge	8 – Washington	8 – Collins	Matthew Knight Arena (5,955); Eugene, OR
January 14, 2023; 2:00 p.m., P12N		at Oregon State	W 74–69	15–3 (6–1)	21 – Des. Cambridge	8 – Dev. Cambridge	4 – Horne	Gill Coliseum (3,789); Corvallis, OR
January 19, 2023; 8:30 p.m., FS1		No. 5 UCLA	L 62–74	15–4 (6–2)	14 – Horne	7 – Washington	3 – Tied	Desert Financial Arena (13,363); Tempe, AZ
January 21, 2023; 8:00 p.m., ESPNU		USC	L 69–77	15–5 (6–3)	21 – Washington	8 – Washington	3 – Tied	Desert Financial Arena (10,505); Tempe, AZ
January 26, 2023; 9:00 p.m., ESPNU		at Washington	L 66–69 ^{OT}	15–6 (6–4)	26 – Des. Cambridge	7 – Dev. Cambridge	6 – Collins	Alaska Airlines Arena (7,332); Seattle, WA
January 28, 2023; 6:00 p.m., ESPNU		at Washington State	L 58–75	15–7 (6–5)	15 – Collins	6 – Tied	3 – Neal	Beasley Coliseum (4,120); Pullman, WA
February 2, 2023; 6:00 p.m., P12N		Oregon State	W 68–57	16–7 (7–5)	18 – Des. Cambridge	6 – Dev. Cambridge	4 – Tied	Desert Financial Arena (8,032); Tempe, AZ
February 4, 2023; 8:00 p.m., ESPN2		Oregon	L 70–75	16–8 (7–6)	18 – Horne	7 – Washington	4 – Collins	Desert Financial Arena (9,815); Tempe, AZ
February 9, 2023; 8:00 p.m., FS1		at Stanford	W 69–65	17–8 (8–6)	18 – Horne	6 – Horne	3 – Collins	Maples Pavilion (3,923); Stanford, CA
February 11, 2023; 6:00 p.m., P12N		at California	W 70–62 ^{OT}	18–8 (9–6)	24 – Cambridge Jr.	13 – Gaffney	5 – Collins	Haas Pavilion (2,088); Berkeley, CA
February 16, 2023; 6:00 p.m., P12N		Colorado	L 59–67	18–9 (9–7)	15 – Horne	5 – Tied	2 – Tied	Desert Financial Arena (7,501); Tempe, AZ
February 18, 2023; 4:00 p.m., P12N		Utah	W 67–59	19–9 (10–7)	18 – Washington	6 – Cambridge	5 – Collins	Desert Financial Arena (8,046); Tempe, AZ
February 25, 2023; 12:00 p.m., CBS		at No. 7 Arizona; Rivalry	W 89–88	20–9 (11–7)	19 – Des. Cambridge	6 – Dev. Cambridge	7 – Horne	McKale Center (14,688); Tucson, AZ
March 2, 2023; 7:00 p.m., ESPN		at No. 4 UCLA	L 61–79	20–10 (11–8)	13 – Horne	6 – Washington	3 – Collins	Pauley Pavilion (10,132); Los Angeles, CA
March 4, 2023; 9:00 p.m., FS1		at USC	L 65–68	20–11 (11–9)	20 – Horne	11 – Washington	3 – Horne	Galen Center (8,671); Los Angeles, CA
Pac-12 Tournament
March 8, 2023; 9:30 p.m., P12N	(6)	vs. (11) Oregon State; First round	W 63–57	21–11	15 – Washington	9 – Washington	5 – Collins	T-Mobile Arena (8,810); Paradise, NV
March 9, 2023; 9:30 p.m., ESPN	(6)	vs. (3) USC; Quarterfinals	W 77–72	22–11	27 – Des. Cambridge	8 – Washington	4 – Horne	T-Mobile Arena (11,226); Paradise, NV
March 10, 2023; 9:30 p.m., ESPN	(6)	vs. (2) No. 8 Arizona; Semifinals/Rivalry	L 59–78	22–12	11 – Tied	6 – Tied	5 – Collins	T-Mobile Arena (13,788); Paradise, NV
NCAA tournament
March 15, 2023; 6:10 p.m., TruTV	(11 W)	vs. (11 W) Nevada; First Four	W 98–73	23–12	20 – Horne	5 – Washington	6 – Des. Cambridge	UD Arena (12,431); Dayton, OH
March 17, 2023*; 8:05 pm, TruTV	(11 W)	vs. (6 W) No. 22 TCU; First Round	L 70–72	23–13	17 – Horne	8 – Washington	2 – Tied	Ball Arena (19,152); Denver, CO
*Non-conference game. ^{#}Rankings from AP Poll. (#) Tournament seedings in parentheses. All times are in Mountain Time.
