= 2023 Pac-12 Conference men's basketball tournament =

American collegiate postseason event

- Classification: Division I
- Season: 2022–23
- Teams: 12
- Site: T-Mobile Arena; Paradise, Nevada
- Champions: Arizona Wildcats (9th title)
- Winning coach: Tommy Lloyd (2nd title)
- MVP: Ąžuolas Tubelis (Arizona)
- Attendance: 65,721
- Television: Pac-12 Network; ESPN

2022–23 Pac-12 Conference men's basketball standings
	Conf.				Overall
Team	W		L	PCT	W		L	PCT
No. 7 UCLA	18	–	2	.900	31	–	6	.838
No. 8 Arizona†	14	–	6	.700	28	–	7	.800
USC	14	–	6	.700	22	–	11	.667
Oregon	12	–	8	.600	21	–	15	.583
Arizona State	11	–	9	.550	23	–	13	.639
Washington State	11	–	9	.550	17	–	17	.500
Utah	10	–	10	.500	17	–	15	.531
Washington	8	–	12	.400	16	–	16	.500
Colorado	8	–	12	.400	18	–	17	.514
Stanford	7	–	13	.350	14	–	19	.424
Oregon State	5	–	15	.250	11	–	21	.344
California	2	–	18	.100	3	–	29	.094
† Conference tournament winner Rankings from AP poll

The 2023 Pac-12 Conference men's basketball tournament was a postseason men's basketball tournament for the Pac-12 Conference held March 8–11, 2023, at T-Mobile Arena on the Las Vegas Strip in Paradise, Nevada. The tournament winner of the conference tournament, Arizona, received the conference's automatic bid to the NCAA tournament.

== Seeds ==
The bracket will be set in March 2023. All 12 schools are scheduled to participate in the tournament. The seedings will be determined upon completion of regular season play. The winning percentage of the teams in conference play determined tournament seedings. There are tiebreakers in place to seed teams with identical conference records. The top four teams receive a bye to the quarterfinals. Tie-breaking procedures for determining all tournament seeding is:

- For two-team tie:
1. Results of head-to-head competition during the regular season.
2. Each team's record (won-lost percentage) vs. the team occupying the highest position in the final regular standings, and then continuing down through the standings until one team gains an advantage. When arriving at another group of tied teams while comparing records, use each team's record (won-lost percentage) against the collective tied teams as a group (prior to that group's own tie-breaking procedure), rather than the performance against individual tied teams.
3. Won-lost percentage against all Division I opponents.
4. Coin toss conducted by the Commissioner or designee.
- For multiple-team tie:
1. Results (won-lost percentage) of collective head-to-head competition during the regular season among the tied teams.
2. If more than two teams are still tied, each of the tied team's record (won-lost percentage) vs. the team occupying the highest position in the final regular season standings, and then continuing down through the standings, eliminating teams with inferior records, until one team gains an advantage.
  When arriving at another group of tied teams while comparing records, use each team's record (won-lost percentage) against the collective tied teams as a group (prior to that group's own tie-breaking procedure), rather than the performance against individual tied teams. After one team has an advantage and is seeded, all remaining teams in the multiple-team tie-breaker will repeat the multiple-team tie-breaking procedure. If at any point the multiple-team tie is reduced to two teams, the two-team tie-breaking procedure will be applied.
3. Won-lost percentage against all Division I opponents.
4. Coin toss conducted by the Commissioner or designee.

Seed	School	Conference	Overall	Tiebreak 1	Tiebreak 2	Tiebreak 3
1	UCLA†#	18–2	27–4	–	–	–
2	Arizona#	14–6	25–6	2–0 vs. USC	–	–
3	USC#	14–6	22–9	0–2 vs. Arizona	–	–
4	Oregon#	12–8	18–13	–	–	–
5	Washington State	11–9	16–15	1–1 vs. Arizona State	0–2 vs. UCLA	2–2 vs. Arizona/USC
6	Arizona State	11–9	20–11	1–1 vs. Washington State	0–2 vs. UCLA	1–3 vs. Arizona/USC
7	Utah	10–10	17–14	–	–	–
8	Washington	8–12	16–15	2–0 vs. Colorado	–	–
9	Colorado	8–12	16–15	0–2 vs. Washington	–	–
10	Stanford	7–13	13–18	–	–	–
11	Oregon State	5–15	11–20	–	–	–
12	California	2–18	3–28	–	–	–
† – Pac-12 Conference regular season champions # – Received a first round bye in the conference tournament. Rankings from AP poll

== Schedule ==
Game	Time	Matchup	Score	Television	Attendance
First round – Wednesday, March 8
1	12:00 p.m.	No. 8 Washington vs. No. 9 Colorado	68−74	Pac-12 Network	7,469
2	2:30 p.m.	No. 5 Washington State vs. No. 12 California	69−52	Pac-12 Network	7,469
3	6:00 p.m.	No. 7 Utah vs. No. 10 Stanford	62−73	Pac-12 Network	8,810
4	8:30 p.m.	No. 6 Arizona State vs. No. 11 Oregon State	63−57	Pac-12 Network	8,810
Quarterfinals – Thursday, March 9
5	12:00 p.m.	No. 1 UCLA vs. No. 9 Colorado	80−69	Pac-12 Network	10,406
6	2:30 p.m.	No. 4 Oregon vs. No. 5 Washington State	75−70	Pac-12 Network	10,406
7	6:00 p.m.	No. 2 Arizona vs. No. 10 Stanford	95−84	Pac-12 Network	11,226
8	8:30 p.m.	No. 3 USC vs. No. 6 Arizona State	72−77	ESPN	11,226
Semifinals – Friday, March 10
9	6:00 p.m.	No. 1 UCLA vs. No. 4 Oregon	75−56	Pac-12 Network	13,788
10	8:30 p.m.	No. 2 Arizona vs. No. 6 Arizona State	78−59	ESPN	13,788
Championship – Saturday, March 11
11	7:30 p.m.	No. 1 UCLA vs. No. 2 Arizona	59−61	ESPN	14,022
Game times in PT. Rankings denote tournament seed.

== Bracket ==
First round Wednesday, March 8
8	Washington	68
9	Colorado	74
5	Washington State	69
12	California	52
7	Utah	62
10	Stanford	73
6	Arizona State	63
11	Oregon State	57

Quarterfinals; Thursday, March 9
1	#2 UCLA	80
9	Colorado	69
4	Oregon	75
5	Washington State	70
2	#8 Arizona	95
10	Stanford	84
3	USC	72
6	Arizona State	77

Semifinals; Friday, March 10
1	#2 UCLA	75
4	Oregon	56
2	#8 Arizona	78
6	Arizona State	59

Championship; Saturday, March 11
1	#2 UCLA	59
2	#8 Arizona	61

* denotes overtime period

== Game statistics ==
=== First round ===
Pac-12 Network

March 8
12:00 p.m.

No. 8 Washington 68, No. 9 Colorado 74
Scoring by half: 20−28, 48−46
Pts: tied, 16; Rebs: Jamal Bey, 7 Asts: Keyon Menifield, 5	Pts: Julian Hammond III, 21; Rebs: Luke O'Brien, 10; Asts: Tristan da Silva, 5

T-Mobile Arena
Paradise, NV
Attendance: 7,469
Referees: Verne Harris, D.G. Nelson, Mike Littlewood

Pac-12 Network

March 8
2:30 p.m.

No. 5 Washington State 69, No. 12 California 52
Scoring by half: 35−21, 34−31
Pts: TJ Bamba, 17; Rebs: DJ Rodman, 11; Asts: Mouhamed Gueye, 4	Pts: Monty Bowser, 19; Rebs: Joel Brown, 6 Asts: Joel Brown, 4

T-Mobile Arena
Paradise, NV
Attendance: 7,469
Referees: Tony Padilla, Frank Harvey III, Mike Scyphers

Pac-12 Network

March 8
6:00 p.m.

No. 7 Utah 62, No. 10 Stanford 73
Scoring by half: 27−34, 35−39
Pts: Branden Carlson, 27; Rebs: Branden Carlson, 10; Asts: Lazar Stefanovic, 4	Pts: Brandon Angel, 16; Rebs: Brandon Angel, 2 Asts: tied, 4

T-Mobile Arena
Paradise, NV
Attendance: 8,810
Referees: Michael Irving, Greg Nixon, Deldre Carr

Pac-12 Network

March 8
8:30 p.m.

No. 6 Arizona State 63, No. 11 Oregon State 57
Scoring by half: 29−26, 34−31
Pts: Warren Washington, 15; Rebs: Warren Washington, 9 Asts: Frankie Collins, 5	Pts: Glenn Taylor Jr., 17; Rebs: tied, 7 Asts: Michael Rataj, 5

T-Mobile Arena
Paradise, NV
Attendance: 8,810
Referees: David Hall, Kevin Brill, Deron White

=== Quarterfinals ===
Pac-12 Network

March 9
12:00 p.m.

No. 1 UCLA 80, No. 9 Colorado 69
Scoring by half: 37−38, 43−31
Pts: Amari Bailey, 26; Rebs: Adem Bona, 10; Asts: Tyger Campbell, 7	Pts: Tristan da Silva, 17; Rebs: Luke O'Brien, 7 Asts: Julian Hammond III, 6

T-Mobile Arena
Paradise, NV
Attendance: 10,406
Referees: Michael Greenstein, Kevin Brill, Larry Spaulding

Pac-12 Network

March 9
2:30 p.m.

No. 4 Oregon 75, No. 5 Washington State 70
Scoring by half: 38−30, 37−40
Pts: 2 tied, 17; Rebs: N’Faly Dante, 11; Asts: Will Richardson, 4	Pts: TJ Bamba, 19; Rebs: Justin Powell, 7 Asts: TJ Bamba, 5

T-Mobile Arena
Paradise, NV
Attendance: 10,406
Referees: Verne Harris, Glen Mayberry, Randy Richardson

Pac-12 Network

March 9
6:00 p.m.

No. 2 Arizona 95, No. 10 Stanford 84
Scoring by half: 47−43, 48−41
Pts: Oumar Ballo, 24; Rebs: Ąžuolas Tubelis, 8 Asts: Pelle Larsson, 5	Pts: Spencer Jones, 22; Rebs: Brandon Angel, 7 Asts: Harrison Ingram, 5

T-Mobile Arena
Paradise, NV
Attendance: 11,226
Referees: Mike Reed, Tony Padilla, Greg Nixon

ESPN

March 9
8:30 p.m.

No. 3 USC 72, No. 6 Arizona State 77
Scoring by half: 25−39, 47−38
Pts: tied, 16; Rebs: Joshua Morgan, 10; Asts: Boogie Ellis, 4	Pts: Desmond Cambridge Jr., 27; Rebs: Warren Washington, 8 Asts: tied, 4

T-Mobile Arena
Paradise, NV
Attendance: 11,226
Referees: Eric Curry, Deldre Carr, Jim Schipper

=== Semifinals ===
Pac-12 Network

March 10
6:00 p.m.

No. 1 UCLA 75, No. 4 Oregon 56
Scoring by half: 32−30, 43−26
Pts: Tyger Campbell, 28; Rebs: Jaime Jaquez Jr., 10; Asts: Tyger Campbell, 6	Pts: Tied, 10; Rebs: N’Faly Dante, 10; Asts: Tied, 3

T-Mobile Arena
Paradise, NV
Attendance: 13,788
Referees: Tony Padilla, Michael Irving, Greg Nixon

ESPN

March 10
8:30 p.m.

No. 2 Arizona 78, No. 6 Arizona State 59
Scoring by half: 35−28, 43−30
Pts: Ąžuolas Tubelis, 17; Rebs: Tied, 9 Asts: Kerr Kriisa, 7	Pts: Tied, 11; Rebs: Tied, 6 Asts: Frankie Collins, 5

T-Mobile Arena
Paradise, NV
Attendance: 13,788
Referees: Michael Greenstein, Greg Nixon, Deron White

=== Championship ===
ESPN

March 11
7:30 p.m.

No. 1 UCLA 59, No. 2 Arizona 61
Scoring by half: 34−33, 25−28
Pts: Amari Bailey, 19; Rebs: Jaime Jaquez Jr., 10; Asts: Tied, 2	Pts: Ąžuolas Tubelis, 19; Rebs: Ąžuolas Tubelis, 14; Asts: Pelle Larsson, 5

T-Mobile Arena
Paradise, NV
Attendance: 14,022
Referees: Verne Harris, Tony Padilla, Mike Reed

== Awards and honors ==
=== Hall of Honor ===
The 2023 class of the Pac-12 Hall of Honor will be honored on March 3 during the 2023 Women's Tournament during a ceremony prior to the tournament semifinals. The 2023 class will be the first ever all-female class inducted into the Hall of Honor in recognition of the 50th anniversary of the passage of Title IX. The class includes:

- Susie Parra (Arizona Softball)
- Jackie Johnson-Powell (Arizona State Women's Track & Field)
- Dr. Luella Lilly (California Athletic Director)
- Ceal Barry (Colorado Women's Basketball Coach & Administrator)
- Janie Takeda Reed (Oregon Softball)
- Dr. Mary Budke (Oregon State Women's Golf)
- Jessica Mendoza (Stanford Softball)
- Natalie Williams (UCLA Women's Basketball & Volleyball)
- Barbara Hallquist DeGroot (USC Women's Tennis)
- Kim Gaucher (Utah Women's Basketball)
- Danielle Lawrie (Washington Softball)
- Sarah Silvernail (Washington State Women's Volleyball)

=== Team and tournament leaders ===
Team	Points		Rebounds		Assists		Steals		Blocks		Minutes	
Arizona	Ąžuolas Tubelis	56	Ąžuolas Tubelis	31	Pelle Larsson	13	Cedric Henderson Jr.	6	Oumar Ballo	5	Ąžuolas Tubelis	105
Arizona State	Desmond Cambridge Jr.	48	Warren Washington	23	Frankie Collins	14	Desmond Cambridge	9	Warren Washington	3	DJ Horne	99
California	Monty Bowser	19	Joel Brown	6	Joel Brown	4	Joel Brown	2	3 tied	1	2 tied	35
Colorado	2 tied	35	Luke O'Brien	17	Julian Hammond III	8	Luke O'Brien	3	2 tied	1	Julian Hammond III	70
Oregon	Keeshawn Barthelemy	25	N’Faly Dante	21	Will Richardson	7	2 tied	2	Kel’el Ware	4	Will Richardson	67
Oregon State	Glenn Taylor	17	2 tied	7	Michael Rataj	5	2 tied	3	—	―	2 tied	37
Stanford	Brandon Angel	35	Brandon Angel	19	Michael O’Connell	8	2 tied	3	Max Murrell	5	Brandon Angel	67
UCLA	Tyger Campbell	62	Jaime Jaquez Jr.	29	Tyger Campbell	15	Tyger Campbell	4	Adem Bona	5	Jaime Jaquez Jr.	110
USC	2 tied	16	Joshua Morgan	10	Boogie Ellis	4	3 tied	2	Joshua Morgan	1	Drew Peterson	38
Utah	Branden Carlson	27	Branden Carlson	10	Lazar Stefanovic	4	Rollie Worster	1	Keba Keita	1	2 tied	32
Washington	Cole Bajema	16	Jamal Bey	7	Keyon Menifield	6	Keion Brooks Jr.	3	2 tied	1	Keyon Menifield	37
Washington State	TJ Bamba	36	DJ Rodman	15	TJ Bamba	7	2 tied	2	Mouhamed Gueye	3	TJ Bamba	70

=== All-Tournament Team ===
Name	Pos.	Height	Weight	Year	Team
Ąžuolas Tubelis	Power forward	6–11	245	Junior	Arizona
Oumar Ballo	Center	7−0	260	RS-Junior	Arizona
Jaime Jaquez Jr.	Small forward	6−7	225	Senior	UCLA
Tyger Campbell	Point guard	5−11	180	Senior	UCLA
Amari Bailey	Shooting guard	6−5	185	Freshman	UCLA
Desmond Cambridge Jr.	Shooting guard	6−4	180	Graduate Senior	Arizona State

=== Most Outstanding Player ===
Name	Pos.	Height	Weight	Year	Team
Ąžuolas Tubelis	PF	6–11	245	Junior	Arizona

== Tournament notes ==
- The following teams at the start of the tournament, No. 2 UCLA & No. 8 Arizona were ranked in the top 25.
- The following were extended invitations to the 2023 NCAA tournament: Arizona, Arizona State, UCLA & USC.
- The following teams were extended invitations to the 2023 National Invitation Tournament: Colorado, Oregon & Washington State

== See also ==
- 2023 Pac-12 Conference women's basketball tournament
