= 2023 National Invitation Tournament =

Men's college basketball tournament

- Season: 2022–23
- Teams: 32
- Finals site: Orleans Arena, Paradise, Nevada
- Champions: North Texas Mean Green (1st title)
- Runner-up: UAB Blazers (1st title game)
- Semifinalists: Wisconsin Badgers (1st semifinal); Utah Valley Wolverines (1st semifinal)
- Winning coach: Grant McCasland (1st title)
- MVP: Tylor Perry (North Texas)

The 2023 National Invitation Tournament was a single-elimination tournament of 32 NCAA Division I men's college basketball teams not selected to participate in the 2023 NCAA tournament. The tournament began on March 14 and ended on March 30. The first three rounds were played on campuses, with the semifinal and championship final played at Orleans Arena in the Las Vegas Valley.

== Participants ==
Teams and parings for the 2023 NIT were released by the NIT Committee on Sunday, March 12. Thirty-two teams qualified for the NIT, both automatic qualifiers and at-large selections. In 2022, the Xavier Musketeers won the NIT Title.

=== Automatic qualifiers ===
Teams which had the best regular-season record in their conference but failed to win their conference tournament automatically qualified for the 2023 NIT if they were not selected for the 2023 NCAA Tournament.

| Team | Conference | Overall record | Appearance | Last bid |
|---|---|---|---|---|
| Eastern Washington | Big Sky | 22–10 | 2nd | 2003 |
| UC Irvine | Big West | 23–11 | 7th | 2017 |
| Hofstra | CAA | 24–9 | 7th | 2019 |
| Youngstown State | Horizon | 24–9 | 1st | Never |
| Yale | Ivy League | 21–8 | 2nd | 2002 |
| Toledo | MAC | 27–7 | 10th | 2022 |
| Bradley | MVC | 25–9 | 22nd | 2007 |
| Morehead State | OVC | 21–11 | 1st | Never |
| Southern Miss | Sun Belt | 25–7 | 11th | 2014 |
| Alcorn State | SWAC | 18–13 | 4th | 2022 |
| Utah Valley | WAC | 25–8 | 2nd | 2014 |

=== At-large bids ===
The following teams were awarded at-large bids.

| Team | Conference | Overall record | Appearance | Last bid |
|---|---|---|---|---|
| Cincinnati | American | 21–12 | 11th | 2010 |
| Clemson | ACC | 23–10 | 18th | 2019 |
| Colorado | Pac-12 | 17–16 | 13th | 2022 |
| Florida | SEC | 16–16 | 11th | 2022 |
| Liberty | ASUN | 26–8 | 1st | Never |
| Michigan | Big Ten | 17–15 | 10th | 2007 |
| New Mexico | Mountain West | 22–11 | 20th | 2011 |
| North Texas | Conference USA | 26–7 | 2nd | 2022 |
| Oklahoma State | Big 12 | 18–15 | 13th | 2018 |
| Oregon | Pac-12 | 19–14 | 13th | 2022 |
| Rutgers | Big Ten | 19–14 | 15th | 2006 |
| Sam Houston | WAC | 25–7 | 2nd | 2019 |
| Santa Clara | West Coast | 23–9 | 7th | 2022 |
| Seton Hall | Big East | 17–15 | 18th | 2012 |
| UAB | Conference USA | 25–9 | 13th | 2016 |
| UCF | American | 18–14 | 3rd | 2017 |
| Vanderbilt | SEC | 20–14 | 14th | 2022 |
| Villanova | Big East | 17–16 | 18th | 2004 |
| Virginia Tech | ACC | 19–14 | 14th | 2016 |
| Washington State | Pac-12 | 17–16 | 7th | 2022 |
| Wisconsin | Big Ten | 17–14 | 5th | 1996 |

=== Declined invitations ===
The following programs declined to participate in the 2023 NIT:

- North Carolina
- Dayton (It is unclear if Dayton would have been invited had they not preemptively declined.)

== Bracket ==
The 32-team bracket was announced on March 12, via the NIT Selection Show on ESPNU at 10 p.m. EST.

First round March 14–15; Campus sites
1 | Oklahoma State^ | 69
8 | Youngstown State | 64
4 | Washington State | 74
5 | Eastern Washington | 81
2 | North Texas | 69
7 | Alcorn State | 53
3 | Sam Houston^^ | 58
6 | Santa Clara | 56

Second round March 18–19; Campus sites
1 | Oklahoma State | 71
5 | Eastern Washington | 60
2 | North Texas | 75
3 | Sam Houston | 55

Quarterfinal; March 21; Gallagher-Iba Arena
1 | Oklahoma State | 59
2 | North Texas | 65^{OT}

^ Oklahoma State played its first-round game at Youngstown State due to a scheduling conflict at Gallagher-Iba Arena.
^^ Sam Houston State played its first-round game at Santa Clara due to a scheduling conflict at Bernard Johnson Coliseum.

First round March 14–15; Campus sites
1 | Oregon | 84
8 | UC Irvine | 58
4 | Florida | 49
5 | UCF | 67
2 | Wisconsin | 81
7 | Bradley | 62
3 | Liberty | 62
6 | Villanova | 57

Second round March 18–19; Campus sites
1 | Oregon | 68
5 | UCF | 54
2 | Wisconsin | 75
3 | Liberty | 71

Quarterfinal; March 21; Matthew Knight Arena
1 | Oregon | 58
2 | Wisconsin | 61

First round March 14–15; Campus sites
1 | Rutgers | 86
8 | Hofstra | 88^{OT}
4 | Cincinnati | 81
5 | Virginia Tech | 72
2 | New Mexico | 69
7 | Utah Valley | 83
3 | Colorado | 65
6 | Seton Hall | 64

Second round March 18–19; Campus sites
8 | Hofstra | 65
4 | Cincinnati^ | 79
7 | Utah Valley | 81
3 | Colorado | 69

Quarterfinal; March 22; UCCU Center
4 | Cincinnati^^ | 68
7 | Utah Valley | 74

^ Cincinnati played its second-round game at Hofstra due to their home court at Fifth Third Arena being renovated.
^^ Cincinnati played its third-round game at Utah Valley due to their home court at Fifth Third Arena being renovated.

First round March 14–15; Campus sites
1 | Clemson | 64
8 | Morehead State | 68
4 | UAB | 88
5 | Southern Miss | 60
2 | Vanderbilt | 71
7 | Yale | 62
3 | Michigan | 90
6 | Toledo | 80

Second round March 18–19; Campus sites
8 | Morehead State | 59
4 | UAB | 77
2 | Vanderbilt | 66
3 | Michigan | 65

Quarterfinal; March 22; Memorial Gymnasium
4 | UAB | 67
2 | Vanderbilt | 59

Semifinals; March 28; Orleans Arena
2 | North Texas | 56
2 | Wisconsin | 54
7 | Utah Valley | 86
4 | UAB | 88^{OT}

Final; March 30; Orleans Arena
2 | North Texas | 68
4 | UAB | 61

== Media ==
ESPN, Inc. had exclusive television rights to all of the NIT games. It telecast every game across ESPN, ESPN2, ESPNU, ESPN3, and ESPN+. Westwood One had exclusive radio rights to the semifinals and the championship.

== See also ==
- 2023 Women's National Invitation Tournament
- 2023 NCAA Division I men's basketball tournament
- 2023 College Basketball Invitational
