= Drew Peterson (basketball) =

American basketball player (born 1999)

No. 13 – Windy City Bulls
- Position: Power forward / small forward
- League: NBA G League

Personal information
- Born: November 9, 1999 (age 27) Libertyville, Illinois, U.S.
- Listed height: 6 ft 8 in (2.03 m)
- Listed weight: 200 lb (91 kg)

Career information
- High school: Libertyville (Libertyville, Illinois)
- College: Rice (2018–2020); USC (2020–2023)
- NBA draft: 2023: undrafted
- Playing career: 2023–present

Career history
- 2023: Sioux Falls Skyforce
- 2023–2025: Boston Celtics
- 2023–2025: →Maine Celtics
- 2025: Charlotte Hornets
- 2025: →Greensboro Swarm
- 2026: Motor City Cruise
- 2026–present: Windy City Bulls

Career highlights
- NBA champion (2024); 2× First-team All-Pac-12 (2022, 2023)
- Stats at NBA.com
- Stats at Basketball Reference

Drew B. Peterson (born November 9, 1999) is an American professional basketball player for the Windy City Bulls of the NBA G League. He played college basketball for the Rice Owls and the USC Trojans.

== Early life and high school career ==
Peterson grew up in Libertyville, Illinois and attended Libertyville High School. He was named the Lake County Player of the Year as a senior after averaging 26.1 points, 8.5 rebounds, and 4.4 assists per game. Peterson committed to playing college basketball for Rice.

== College career ==
Peterson began his college career at Rice. He averaged 5 points and 3.3 rebounds per game as a freshman. Peterson played in all 32 of the Owls games, starting all but one, during his sophomore season and averaged 11.1 points, 6.5 rebounds, and 3.5 assists per game. Following the end of the season, Peterson entered the NCAA transfer portal.

Peterson initially committed to transfer to Minnesota, but later decommitted and re-opened his recruitment. He ultimately transferred to USC. Peterson averaged 9.8 points, five rebounds, and 2.7 assists per game in his first season with the Trojans. As a senior, he was named first-team All-Pac-12 Conference after averaging 12.4 points, 6.2 rebounds, and 3.3 assists per game. Peterson initially entered his name into the 2022 NBA draft, but later withdrew and decided to utilize the extra year of eligibility granted to college athletes who played in the 2020 season due to COVID-19 pandemic and return to USC for a third season. He repeated as a first-team All-Pac-12 selection in his final season after averaging 13.9 points, 6.2 rebounds, and 4.3 assists per game.

== Professional career ==
=== Sioux Falls Skyforce (2023) ===
After going undrafted in the 2023 NBA draft, Peterson joined the Miami Heat for the 2023 NBA Summer League and on August 11, 2023, he signed with them. However, he was waived on October 14. On October 30, he joined the Sioux Falls Skyforce. Peterson averaged 15.2 points, 5.5 rebounds, and 4.2 assists in 13 games with the Skyforce.

=== Boston Celtics (2023–2025) ===
On December 14, 2023, Peterson signed a two-way contract with the Boston Celtics. Nine days later, he made his NBA debut for the Celtics in a 145–108 win over the Los Angeles Clippers. Peterson became an NBA champion when the Celtics defeated the Dallas Mavericks in five games in the NBA Finals. On July 3, 2024, Peterson re-signed with the Celtics on another two-way contract. He made 25 appearances (including one start) for Boston during the 2024–25 NBA season, posting averages of 2.2 points, 1.6 rebounds, and 0.5 assists.

=== Charlotte Hornets (2025) ===
On July 16, 2025, Peterson signed a two-way contract with the Charlotte Hornets. In six appearances for the Hornets, he averaged 0.8 points, 1.5 rebounds, and 0.3 assists. On December 23, Peterson was waived by Charlotte.

== Career statistics ==
Legend
GP	Games played	GS	Games started	MPG	Minutes per game
FG%	Field goal percentage	3P%	3-point field goal percentage	FT%	Free throw percentage
RPG	Rebounds per game	APG	Assists per game	SPG	Steals per game
BPG	Blocks per game	PPG	Points per game	**Bold**	Career high
†	Won an NBA championship

=== NBA ===
Year	Team	GP	GS	MPG	FG%	3P%	FT%	RPG	APG	SPG	BPG	PPG
2023–24†	Boston	3	0	7.7	**.667**	**.600**	—	.3	.3	**.7**	.0	**3.7**
2024–25	Boston	**25**	**1**	7.4	.415	.394	**.778**	**1.6**	**.5**	.2	.1	2.2
2025–26	Charlotte	6	0	**10.7**	.125	.000	.500	1.5	.3	.5	**.2**	.8
Career		34	1	8.0	.365	.320	.727	1.5	.5	.3	.1	2.1

=== College ===
Year	Team	GP	GS	MPG	FG%	3P%	FT%	RPG	APG	SPG	BPG	PPG
2018–19	Rice	32	23	19.8	.340	.298	.756	3.3	1.5	.4	.1	5.0
2019–20	Rice	32	31	32.2	.411	.328	**.824**	**6.5**	3.5	1.0	.4	11.1
2020–21	USC	33	30	28.7	.424	.385	.701	5.0	2.7	.6	.3	9.8
2021–22	USC	**34**	**34**	33.0	**.467**	**.412**	.717	6.2	3.3	.7	**.8**	12.4
2022–23	USC	33	33	**35.9**	.442	.358	.752	6.2	**4.3**	**1.1**	**.8**	**13.9**
Career		164	151	30.0	.427	.358	.749	5.5	3.1	.8	.5	10.5
