= 2022–23 Pac-12 Conference men's basketball season =

2022–23 Pac–12 men's basketball season
- League: NCAA Division I
- Sport: Basketball
- Teams: 12
- TV partner(s): ESPN, ESPN2, ESPNU, Pac-12 Network, Fox Sports 1, FOX, CBS

Regular season
- Regular season champions: UCLA Bruins
- Season MVP: Jaime Jaquez Jr., UCLA
- Top scorer: Ąžuolas Tubelis, Arizona Wildcats

Pac-12 tournament
- Champions: Arizona Wildcats
- Runners-up: UCLA Bruins
- Tournament MVP: Ąžuolas Tubelis, Arizona

Pac-12 men's basketball seasons
- ← 2021–22 2023–24 →

2022–23 Pac-12 Conference men's basketball standings
| | Conf. | | | | Overall |
| Team | W | | L | PCT | W | | L | PCT |
|---|---|---|---|---|---|---|---|---|
| No. 7 UCLA | 18 | – | 2 | .900 | 31 | – | 6 | .838 |
| No. 8 Arizona† | 14 | – | 6 | .700 | 28 | – | 7 | .800 |
| USC | 14 | – | 6 | .700 | 22 | – | 11 | .667 |
| Oregon | 12 | – | 8 | .600 | 21 | – | 15 | .583 |
| Arizona State | 11 | – | 9 | .550 | 23 | – | 13 | .639 |
| Washington State | 11 | – | 9 | .550 | 17 | – | 17 | .500 |
| Utah | 10 | – | 10 | .500 | 17 | – | 15 | .531 |
| Washington | 8 | – | 12 | .400 | 16 | – | 16 | .500 |
| Colorado | 8 | – | 12 | .400 | 18 | – | 17 | .514 |
| Stanford | 7 | – | 13 | .350 | 14 | – | 19 | .424 |
| Oregon State | 5 | – | 15 | .250 | 11 | – | 21 | .344 |
| California | 2 | – | 18 | .100 | 3 | – | 29 | .094 |
† Conference tournament winner Rankings from AP poll

The 2022–23 Pac-12 Conference men's basketball season began with practices in October followed by the 2022–23 NCAA Division I men's basketball season which started on November 7, 2022. Conference play began in December 2022. This was the eleventh season under the Pac–12 Conference name and the 64th since the current Pac-12 charter was established in 1959. Because the Pac-12 includes the history of the Pacific Coast Conference, which existed from 1915 to 1959, in its own history, this was the 108th season of Pac-12 men's basketball.

The Pac-12 tournament took place in March 2023 at the T-Mobile Arena in Paradise, Nevada.

== Pre-season ==
=== Recruiting classes ===
Rankings
| Team | ESPN | Rivals | On3 Recruits | 247 Sports | Signees |
| Arizona | — | No. 37 | No. 19 | No. 73 | 4 |
| Arizona State | ― | No. 49 | No. 44 | No. 54 | 2 |
| California | ― | No. 73 | No. 92 | No. 70 | 2 |
| Colorado | ― | No. 67 | No. 65 | No. 86 | 2 |
| Oregon | ― | No. 42 | No. 4 | No. 48 | 3 |
| Oregon State | ― | No. 58 | No. 96 | No. 66 | 6 |
| Stanford | ― | No. 51 | No. 47 | No. 50 | 3 |
| UCLA | ― | No. 9 | No. 10 | No. 12 | 4 |
| USC | ― | No. 15 | No. 18 | No. 7 | 4 |
| Utah | ― | No. 58 | No. 72 | No. 89 | 3 |
| Washington | ― | ― | No. 60 | No. 43 | 3 |
| Washington State | ― | No. 91 | No. 38 | No. 79 | 4 |

=== Preseason watchlists ===
Below is a table of notable preseason watch lists.

| Player | Wooden | Naismith | Cousy | West | Erving | Malone | Abdul-Jabbar | Olson |
| Amari Bailey | | | | ✓ | | | | |
| Oumar Ballo | | | | | | | ✓ | |
| Adem Bona | | | | | | | ✓ | |
| Tyger Campbell | ✓ | ✓ | ✓ | | | | | ✓ |
| Harrison Ingram | ✓ | ✓ | | | ✓ | | | |
| Jaime Jaquez Jr. | ✓ | ✓ | | | ✓ | | | ✓ |
| Kerr Kriisa | | | ✓ | | | | | |
| Pelle Larsson | | | | | ✓ | | | |
| Drew Peterson | | ✓ | | | | | | |
| Will Richardson | ✓ | ✓ | ✓ | | | | | |
| Ąžuolas Tubelis | ✓ | ✓ | | | | ✓ | | ✓ |
| Kel'el Ware | | | | | | | ✓ | |

=== Preseason All-American teams ===
| Player | The Athletic | Blue Ribbon Sports | CBS | College Hoops Today |
| Jaime Jaquez Jr. | 1st | 2nd | 1st | 2nd |

=== Preseason polls ===
| | 247 Sports | AP | Blue Ribbon | CBS Sports | Coaches | ESPN | KenPom | Lindy's; Sports | NCAA Sports | Sports; Illustrated |
| Arizona | – | No. 17 | No. 19 | No. 17 | No. 13 | No. 17 | No. 10 | No. 18 | No. 31 | No. 17 |
| Arizona State | – | – | – | – | – | – | No. 75 | – | – | – |
| California | – | – | – | – | – | – | No. 146 | – | – | – |
| Colorado | – | – | – | – | – | – | No. 61 | – | – | – |
| Oregon | No. 24 | No. 21 | – | No. 22 | No. 21 | No. 19 | No. 29 | No. 22 | – | No. 24 |
| Oregon State | – | – | – | – | – | – | No. 228 | – | – | – |
| Stanford | – | – | – | – | – | – | No. 58 | – | – | – |
| UCLA | No. 9 | No. 8 | No. 8 | No. 10 | No. 7 | No. 10 | No. 11 | No. 12 | No. 4 | No. 7 |
| USC | – | RV | – | – | RV | – | No. 36 | No. 38 | No. 23 | – |
| Utah | – | – | – | – | – | – | No. 72 | – | – | – |
| Washington | – | – | – | – | – | – | No. 113 | – | – | – |
| Washington State | – | – | – | – | – | – | No. 71 | – | – | – |

=== Pac-12 Media days ===
The Pac-12 will conduct its 2022 Pac-12 media days at the Pac-12 Studio, in San Francisco, California, on October 26, 2022, on the Pac-12 Network.

The teams and representatives in respective order were as follows:

- Pac-12 Commissioner – George Kliavkoff
- Deputy Commissioner and Chief Operating Officer(MBB) – Jamie Zaninovich
- Arizona – Tommy Lloyd (HC), Kerr Kriisa & Ąžuolas Tubelis
- Arizona State – Bobby Hurley (HC), Marcus Bagley & DJ Horne
- California – Mark Fox (HC), Joel Brown & Lars Thiemann
- Colorado – Tad Boyle (HC), Nique Clifford & Tristan da Silva
- Oregon – Dana Altman (HC), N'Faly Dante & Quincy Guerrier
- Oregon State – Wayne Tinkle (HC), Dexter Akanno & Glenn Taylor Jr.
- Stanford – Jerod Haase (HC), Harrison Ingram & Spencer Jones
- UCLA – Mick Cronin (HC), Tyger Campbell & Jaime Jaquez Jr.
- USC – Andy Enfield (HC), Boogie Ellis & Drew Peterson
- Utah – Craig Smith (HC), Marco Anthony & Branden Carlson
- Washington – Mike Hopkins (HC), Jamal Bey & Keion Brooks Jr.
- Washington State – Kyle Smith (HC), TJ Bamba & Mouhamed Gueye

Men's Basketball Preseason Poll
| Place | Team | Points | First place votes |
|---|---|---|---|
| 1. | UCLA | 386 | 26 |
| 2. | Arizona | 352 | 3 |
| 3. | Oregon | 336 | 3 |
| 4. | USC | 300 | -- |
| 5. | Stanford | 239 | 1 |
| 6. | Colorado | 207 | -- |
| 7. | Arizona State | 193 | -- |
| 8. | Washington State | 185 | -- |
| 9. | Washington | 158 | -- |
| 10. | Utah | 102 | -- |
| 11. | California | 69 | -- |
| 12. | Oregon State | 47 | -- |

=== Pac-12 Preseason All-Conference ===
First Team

| Name | School | Pos. | Yr. | Ht. | Hometown (Last School) |
|---|---|---|---|---|---|
| Tyger Campbell | UCLA | PG | R-Sr. | 5−11, 180 | La Porte, IN (La Lumiere School) |
| Branden Carlson | Utah | C | Sr. | 7−0, 228 | South Jordan, UT (Bingham High School) |
| Boogie Ellis | USC | PG | Jr. | 6−3, 185 | San Diego, CA (Mission Bay) |
| Mouhamed Gueye | Washington State | PF | So. | 6−11, 210 | Dakar, Senegal (Prolific Prep) |
| Harrison Ingram | Stanford | SF | So. | 6−7, 230 | Dallas, Tex. (St. Mark's) |
| Jaime Jaquez Jr. | UCLA | SF | Jr. | 6−7, 225 | Camarillo, Calif. (Camarillo High School) |
| Spencer Jones | Stanford | SF | Jr. | 6−7, 225 | Roeland Park, Kan. (Bishop Miege) |
| Drew Peterson | USC | SG | Sr. | 6−9, 205 | Libertyville, Ill. (Brother Rice High School) |
| Will Richardson | Oregon | PG | Sr. | 6−5, 180 | Hinesville, Ga. (Oak Hill Academy) |
| Ąžuolas Tubelis | Arizona | PF | So. | 6−11, 245 | Vilnius, Lithuania (Rytas Vilnius) |

Second Team

| Name | School | Pos. | Yr. | Ht., Wt. | Hometown (Last School) |
|---|---|---|---|---|---|
| Marcus Bagley | Arizona State | SF | So. | 6−8, 225 | Phoenix, Ariz. (Sheldon High School) |
| Tristan da Silva | Colorado | PF | Jr. | 6−9, 217 | Munich, Germany |
| DJ Horne | Arizona State | PG | Jr. | 6−1, 175 | Raleigh, N.C. (Cary High School) |
| Kerr Kriisa | Arizona | PG | Jr. | 6−3, 180 | Tartu, Estonia |
| Pelle Larsson | Arizona | SF | Jr. | 6−5, 220 | Nacka, Sweden |

Honorable Mention

- Amari Bailey, (UCLA, SG)
- Oumar Ballo, (Arizona, C)
- Jaylen Clark, (UCLA, SF)
- Quincy Guerrier, (Oregon, PF)
- KJ Simpson, (Colorado, PG)
- Kel'el Ware, (Oregon, C)

=== Midseason watchlists ===
Below is a table of notable midseason watch lists.

| Player | Wooden | Naismith | Naismith DPOY | Robertson | Cousy | Erving | Malone | Abdul-Jabbar |
| Oumar Ballo | | | ✓ | | | | | ✓ |
| Tyger Campbell | | | | | ✓ | | | |
| Jaylen Clark | | | ✓ | ✓ | | | | |
| Jaime Jaquez Jr. | ✓ | ✓ | | ✓ | | ✓ | | |
| Ąžuolas Tubelis | ✓ | ✓ | | ✓ | | | ✓ | |

=== Final watchlists ===
Below is a table of notable year end watch lists.

| Player | Wooden | Naismith | Naismith DPOY | Robertson | Erving | Malone | Olson |
| Jaylen Clark | | | ✓ | | | | |
| Jaime Jaquez Jr. | ✓ | ✓ | | ✓ | ✓ | | ✓ |
| Ąžuolas Tubelis | ✓ | ✓ | | ✓ | | ✓ | ✓ |

== Regular season ==
The Schedule will be released in late October. Before the season, it was announced that for the seventh consecutive season, all regular season conference games and conference tournament games would be broadcast nationally by ESPN Inc. family of networks including ABC, ESPN, ESPN2 and ESPNU, FOX and FS1, CBS Sports, and the Pac-12 Network.

=== Early season tournaments ===
| Team | Tournament | Finish |
|---|---|---|
| Arizona | Maui Invitational | 1st |
| Arizona State | Legends Classic | 1st |
| California | Emerald Coast Classic | 4th |
| Colorado | Myrtle Beach Invitational | 6th |
| Oregon | Phil Knight Invitational | 7th |
| Oregon State | Phil Knight Legacy | 8th |
| Stanford | ESPN Events Invitational | 6th |
| UCLA | Continental Tire Main Event | 4th |
| USC | Battle 4 Atlantis | 4th |
| Utah | Fort Myers Tip-Off | 2nd |
| Washington | Wooden Legacy | 1st |
| Washington State | Diamond Head Classic | 4th |

=== Records against other conferences ===
Records against non-conference foes for the 2022–23 season. Records shown for regular season only.

Regular season

| Power Conferences | Record |
|---|---|
| ACC | 2–2 |
| Big East | 3–2 |
| Big Ten | 3–4 |
| Big 12 | 0–7 |
| SEC | 5–5 |
| Power Conferences Total | 13–20 |
| Other NCAA Division I Conferences | Record |
| American | 3–2 |
| America East | 1–0 |
| A-10 | 3–1 |
| ASUN | 4–1 |
| Big Sky | 9–3 |
| Big West | 9–4 |
| C-USA | 1–0 |
| Horizon | 4–0 |
| Independent | 1–0 |
| Ivy League | 1–0 |
| MAAC | 1–0 |
| MEAC | 2–0 |
| Mountain West | 5–5 |
| NEC | 1–0 |
| Southland | 2–0 |
| SWAC | 6–4 |
| The Summit | 3–0 |
| Sun Belt | 1–1 |
| WAC | 8–3 |
| WCC | 6–4 |
| Other Division I Total | 71–29 |
| Division II NAIA Total | 1–0 |
| NCAA Division I Total | 85–48 |

Postseason

| Power Conferences | Record |
|---|---|
| Big East | 1–0 |
| Big Ten | 1–2 |
| Big 12 | 0–1 |
| Power Conferences Total | 2–3 |
| Other NCAA Division 1 Conferences | Record |
| American | 1–0 |
| Big Sky | 0–1 |
| Big South | 1–0 |
| Big West | 1–0 |
| Ivy League | 0–1 |
| Mountain West | 1–0 |
| WAC | 0–1 |
| WCC | 0–1 |
| Other Division I Total | 4–4 |
| NCAA Division I Total | 6–7 |

=== Record against ranked non-conference opponents ===
This is a list of games against ranked opponents only (rankings from the AP Poll):

| Date | Visitor | Home | Site | Significance | Score | Conference record |
|---|---|---|---|---|---|---|
| Nov. 13 | No. 11 Tennessee | Colorado† | Bridgestone Arena ● Nashville, TN | − | Colorado 78−66 | 1−0 |
| Nov. 15 | No. 17 San Diego State | Stanford | Maples Pavilion ● Stanford, CA | − | San Diego State 74−62 | 1−1 |
| Nov. 17 | No. 20 Michigan | Arizona State† | Barclays Center ● Brooklyn, NY | Legends Classic | Arizona State 87−62 | 2−1 |
| Nov. 18 | No. 24 Texas A&M | Colorado† | HTC Center ● Conway, SC | Myrtle Beach Invitational | Colorado 103−75 | 3−1 |
| Nov. 18 | No. 19 Illinois | No. 8 UCLA† | T-Mobile Arena ● Paradise, NV | Continental Tire Main Event | Illinois 79−70 | 3−2 |
| Nov. 20 | No. 5 Baylor | No. 8 UCLA† | T-Mobile Arena ● Paradise, NV | Continental Tire Main Event | Baylor 80−75 | 3−3 |
| Nov. 20 | No. 3 Houston | Oregon | Matthew Knight Arena ● Eugene, OR | − | Houston 66−56 | 3−4 |
| Nov. 22 | No. 17 San Diego State | No. 14 Arizona† | Lahaina Civic Center ● Maui, HI | Maui Invitational tournament | Arizona 87−70 | 4−4 |
| Nov. 23 | No. 10 Creighton | No. 14 Arizona† | Lahaina Civic Center ● Maui, HI | Maui Invitational Tournament | Arizona 81−79 | 5−4 |
| Nov. 24 | No. 22 Tennessee | USC† | Imperial Arena ● Nassau, BAH | Battle 4 Atlantis | Tennessee 73−66 | 5−5 |
| Nov. 24 | No. 8 Duke | Oregon State† | Veterans Memorial Coliseum ● Portland, OR | Phil Knight Legacy | Duke 54−51 | 5−6 |
| Nov. 24 | No. 20 UConn | Oregon† | Moda Center ● Portland, OR | Phil Knight Invitational | UConn 83−59 | 5−7 |
| Nov. 25 | No. 12 Michigan State | Oregon† | Moda Center ● Portland, OR | Phil Knight Invitational | Michigan State 74−70 | 5−8 |
| Dec. 9 | Washington | No. 18 Gonzaga | McCarthey Athletic Center ● Spokane, WA | Gonzaga–Washington men's basketball rivalry | Gonzaga 77−60 | 5−9 |
| Dec. 10 | No. 14 Indiana | No. 10 Arizona† | MGM Grand Garden Arena ● Paradise, NV | Las Vegas Clash | Arizona 85−75 | 6−9 |
| Dec. 14 | No. 20 Maryland | No. 16 UCLA | Xfinity Center ● College Park, MD | − | UCLA 87−60 | 7−9 |
| Dec. 17 | No. 20 Kentucky | No. 16 UCLA | Madison Square Garden ● New York, NY | CBS Sports Classic | UCLA 63−53 | 8−9 |
| Dec. 17 | No. 6 Tennessee | No. 9 Arizona | McKale Center ● Tucson, AZ | − | Arizona 75−70 | 9−9 |
| Dec. 18 | No. 7 Texas | Stanford† | American Airlines Center ● Dallas, TX | Pac-12 Coast-to-Coast Challenge | Texas 72−62 | 9−10 |
| Dec. 18 | No. 19 Auburn | USC | Galen Center ● Los Angeles, CA | − | USC 74−71 | 10−10 |
| Dec. 18 | No. 11 Baylor | Washington State† | American Airlines Center ● Dallas, TX | Pac-12 Coast-to-Coast Challenge | Baylor 65−59 | 10−11 |
| Dec. 21 | No. 23 Auburn | Washington | Hec Edmundson Pavilion ● Seattle, WA | − | Auburn 84−61 | 10−12 |
| Dec. 21 | No. 20 TCU | Utah† | Vivint Arena ● Salt Lake City, UT | − | TCU 75−71 | 10−13 |

=== Pac-12/SWAC Legacy Series ===
On September 20, 2021, the Pac-12 and Southwestern Athletic Conference will debut the Pac-12/SWAC Legacy Series, an educational and basketball scheduling partnership between the two collegiate athletics conferences, to tip off the 2022–23 season. The Legacy Series will incorporate an array of educational opportunities for competing teams and student-athletes featuring expert speakers and prominent alumni, community engagement, campus traditions, historic site visits, and book/film discussions. The two conferences split the series 3−3.

| Date | Visitor | Home | Site | Significance | Score | Conference record |
|---|---|---|---|---|---|---|
| Nov. 7 | Florida A&M | No. 21 Oregon | Matthew Knight Arena ● Eugene, OR | Pac-12/SWAC Legacy Series | Oregon 80−55 | 1−0 |
| Nov. 10 | Alabama State | USC | Galen Center ● Los Angeles, CA | Pac-12/SWAC Legacy Series | USC 96−58 | 2−0 |
| Nov. 11 | Grambling State | Colorado | CU Events Center ● Boulder, CO | Pac-12/SWAC Legacy Series | Grambling State 83−74 | 2−1 |
| Nov. 11 | Southern | No. 17 Arizona | McKale Center ● Tucson, AZ | Pac-12/SWAC Legacy Series | Arizona 95−78 | 3−1 |
| Nov. 13 | Arizona State | Texas Southern | H&PE Arena ● Houston, TX | Pac-12/SWAC Legacy Series | Texas Southern 67−66^{OT} | 3−2 |
| Nov. 15 | Washington State | Prairie View A&M | William J. Nicks Building ● Prairie View, TX | Pac-12/SWAC Legacy Series | Prairie View A&M 70−59 | 3−3 |

Team rankings are reflective of AP poll when the game was played, not current or final ranking

=== Conference schedule ===
This table summarizes the head-to-head results between teams in conference play.

| | Arizona | ASU | California | Colorado | Oregon | OSU | Stanford | UCLA | USC | Utah | Washington | WSU |
|---|---|---|---|---|---|---|---|---|---|---|---|---|
| vs. Arizona | – | 1–1 | 0–2 | 0–1 | 1–1 | 0–2 | 1–0 | 1–1 | 0–2 | 1–1 | 0–2 | 1–1 |
| vs. Arizona State | 1–1 | – | 0–1 | 1–1 | 1–1 | 0–2 | 0–2 | 2–0 | 2–0 | 0–1 | 1–1 | 1–1 |
| vs. California | 2–0 | 1–0 | – | 1–1 | 2–0 | 2–0 | 1–1 | 1–0 | 2–0 | 2–0 | 2–0 | 2–0 |
| vs. Colorado | 1–0 | 1–1 | 1–1 | – | 1–1 | 1–1 | 0–2 | 2–0 | 2–0 | 1–1 | 2–0 | 0–1 |
| vs. Oregon | 1–1 | 1–1 | 0–2 | 1–1 | – | 0–2 | 1–1 | 2–0 | 0–1 | 0–2 | 1–0 | 1–1 |
| vs. Oregon State | 2–0 | 2–0 | 0–2 | 1–1 | 2–0 | – | 2–0 | 1–0 | 1–1 | 2–0 | 1–1 | 1–0 |
| vs. Stanford | 0–1 | 2–0 | 1–1 | 2–0 | 1–1 | 0–2 | – | 2–0 | 1–0 | 1–1 | 1–1 | 2–0 |
| vs. UCLA | 1–1 | 0–2 | 0–1 | 0–2 | 0–2 | 0–1 | 0–2 | – | 1–1 | 0–2 | 0–2 | 0–2 |
| vs. USC | 2–0 | 0–2 | 0–2 | 0–2 | 1–0 | 1–1 | 0–1 | 1–1 | – | 0–2 | 0–2 | 1–1 |
| vs. Utah | 1–1 | 1–0 | 0–2 | 1–1 | 2–0 | 0–2 | 1–1 | 2–0 | 2–0 | – | 0–1 | 0–2 |
| vs. Washington | 2–0 | 1–1 | 0–2 | 0–2 | 0–1 | 1–1 | 1–1 | 2–0 | 2–0 | 1–0 | – | 2–0 |
| vs. Washington State | 1–1 | 1–1 | 0–2 | 1–0 | 1–1 | 0–1 | 0–2 | 2–0 | 1–1 | 2–0 | 0–2 | – |
| Total | 14–6 | 11–9 | 2–18 | 8–12 | 12–8 | 5–15 | 7–13 | 18–2 | 14–6 | 10–10 | 8–12 | 11–9 |

=== Points scored ===
| Team | For | Against | Difference |
|---|---|---|---|
| Arizona | 2,866 | 2,490 | 376 |
| Arizona State | 2,559 | 2,447 | 112 |
| California | 1,866 | 2,243 | -377 |
| Colorado | 2,445 | 2,348 | 97 |
| Oregon | 2,542 | 2,386 | 156 |
| Oregon State | 1,959 | 2,144 | -185 |
| Stanford | 2,321 | 2,256 | 65 |
| UCLA | 2,743 | 2,245 | 498 |
| USC | 2,391 | 2,224 | 167 |
| Utah | 2,197 | 2,043 | 154 |
| Washington | 2,213 | 2,250 | -37 |
| Washington State | 2,324 | 2,235 | 96 |

Through the 2023 season

=== Rankings ===
*AP does not release post-NCAA tournament rankings

| | Improvement in ranking |
| | Drop in ranking |
| RV | Received votes but were not ranked in Top 25 |
| NV | No votes received |

| Team | Poll | Pre | Wk 2 | Wk 3 | Wk 4 | Wk 5 | Wk 6 | Wk 7 | Wk 8 | Wk 9 | Wk 10 | Wk 11 | Wk 12 | Wk 13 | Wk 14 | Wk 15 | Wk 16 | Wk 17 | Wk 18 | Wk 19 | Final |
|---|---|---|---|---|---|---|---|---|---|---|---|---|---|---|---|---|---|---|---|---|---|
| Arizona | AP | 17 | 14 | 14 | 4 | 10 | 9 | 5 | 5 | 5 | 9 | 11 | 6 | 5 | 4 | 8 | 7 | 8 | 8 | 8 | |
| Arizona | C | 13 | 12 | 12 | 4 | 9 | 9 | 5 | 5 | 4 | 9 | 11 | 8 | 6 | 4 | 8 | 7 | 9 | 9 | 8 | 17 |
| Arizona State | AP | NV | RV | RV | RV | RV | RV | 25 | NV | NV | NV | RV | NV | NV | NV | NV | NV | NV | NV | NV | |
| Arizona State | C | NV | NV | RV | NV | NV | RV | RV | RV | NV | NV | RV | NV | NV | NV | NV | NV | NV | NV | NV | NV |
| California | AP | NV | NV | NV | NV | NV | NV | NV | NV | NV | NV | NV | NV | NV | NV | NV | NV | NV | NV | NV | |
| California | C | NV | NV | NV | NV | NV | NV | NV | NV | NV | NV | NV | NV | NV | NV | NV | NV | NV | NV | NV | NV |
| Colorado | AP | NV | RV | NV | NV | NV | NV | NV | NV | NV | NV | NV | NV | NV | NV | NV | NV | NV | NV | NV | |
| Colorado | C | NV | NV | NV | NV | NV | NV | NV | NV | NV | NV | NV | NV | NV | NV | NV | NV | NV | NV | NV | NV |
| Oregon | AP | 21 | RV | RV | NV | NV | NV | NV | NV | NV | NV | NV | NV | NV | NV | NV | NV | NV | NV | NV | |
| Oregon | C | 21 | RV | NV | NV | NV | NV | NV | NV | NV | NV | NV | NV | NV | NV | NV | NV | NV | NV | NV | NV |
| Oregon State | AP | NV | NV | NV | NV | NV | NV | NV | NV | NV | NV | NV | NV | NV | NV | NV | NV | NV | NV | NV | |
| Oregon State | C | NV | NV | NV | NV | NV | NV | NV | NV | NV | NV | NV | NV | NV | NV | NV | NV | NV | NV | NV | NV |
| Stanford | AP | NV | NV | NV | NV | NV | NV | NV | NV | NV | NV | NV | NV | NV | NV | NV | NV | NV | NV | NV | |
| Stanford | C | NV | NV | NV | NV | NV | NV | NV | NV | NV | NV | NV | NV | NV | NV | NV | NV | NV | NV | NV | NV |
| UCLA | AP | 8 | 8 | 19 | 21 | 19 | 16 | 13 | 11 | 10 | 7 | 5 | 8 | 9 | 7 | 4 | 4 | 4 | 2 | 7 | |
| UCLA | C | 7 | 7 | 17 | 21 | 18 | 14 | 9 | 8 | 8 | 7 | 5 | 7 | 9т | 7 | 4 | 3 | 4 | 2 | 6 | 8 |
| USC | AP | RV | NV | NV | NV | NV | NV | RV | RV | NV | NV | NV | NV | NV | NV | NV | NV | NV | RV | NV | |
| USC | C | RV | NV | NV | NV | NV | NV | RV | RV | NV | NV | NV | NV | NV | RV | NV | NV | RV | NV | NV | RV |
| Utah | AP | NV | NV | NV | NV | RV | NV | NV | NV | NV | NV | NV | NV | NV | NV | NV | NV | NV | NV | NV | |
| Utah | C | NV | NV | NV | NV | NV | NV | NV | NV | NV | NV | NV | NV | NV | NV | NV | NV | NV | NV | NV | NV |
| Washington | AP | NV | NV | NV | NV | NV | NV | NV | NV | NV | NV | NV | NV | NV | NV | NV | NV | NV | NV | NV | |
| Washington | C | NV | NV | NV | NV | NV | NV | NV | NV | NV | NV | NV | NV | NV | NV | NV | NV | NV | NV | NV | NV |
| Washington State | AP | NV | NV | NV | NV | NV | NV | NV | NV | NV | NV | NV | NV | NV | NV | NV | NV | NV | NV | NV | |
| Washington State | C | NV | NV | NV | NV | NV | NV | NV | NV | NV | NV | NV | NV | NV | NV | NV | NV | NV | NV | NV | NV |

== Head coaches ==
=== Coaches ===
Note: Stats shown are before the beginning of the season. Pac-12 records are from time at current school.

| Team | Head coach | Previous job | Seasons at school | Record at school | Pac-12 record | Pac-12 titles | NCAA tournaments | NCAA Final Fours | NCAA Championships |
|---|---|---|---|---|---|---|---|---|---|
| Arizona | Tommy Lloyd | Gonzaga (assistant) | 2nd | 33–4 (.892) | 18–2 (.900) | 1 | 1 | 0 | 0 |
| Arizona State | Bobby Hurley | Buffalo | 7th | 118–100 (.541) | 60–67 (.472) | 0 | 2 | 0 | 0 |
| California | Mark Fox† | Georgia | 4th | 34–58 (.370) | 15–43 (.259) | 0 | 0 | 0 | 0 |
| Colorado | Tad Boyle | Northern Colorado | 13th | 254–155 (.621) | 118–100 (.541) | 0 | 5 | 0 | 0 |
| Oregon | Dana Altman | Creighton | 13th | 300–125 (.706) | 143–75 (.656) | 3 | 7 | 1 | 0 |
| Oregon State | Wayne Tinkle | Montana | 9th | 116–136 (.460) | 53–95 (.358) | 1 | 2 | 0 | 0 |
| Stanford | Jerod Haase | UAB | 7th | 98–90 (.521) | 52–60 (.464) | 0 | 0 | 0 | 0 |
| UCLA | Mick Cronin | Cincinnati | 4th | 68–30 (.694) | 40–17 (.702) | 0 | 2 | 1 | 0 |
| USC | Andy Enfield | Florida Gulf Coast | 10th | 183–118 (.608) | 84–82 (.506) | 0 | 3 | 0 | 0 |
| Utah | Craig Smith | Utah State | 2nd | 11–20 (.355) | 4–16 (.200) | 0 | 0 | 0 | 0 |
| Washington | Mike Hopkins | Syracuse (assistant) | 6th | 85–75 (.531) | 45–49 (.479) | 0 | 1 | 0 | 0 |
| Washington State | Kyle Smith | San Francisco | 4th | 52–44 (.542) | 24–33 (.421) | 0 | 0 | 0 | 0 |

Notes:
† On March 9, 2023, Cal fired head coach Mark Fox.

- Pac-12 records, conference titles, etc. are from time at current school and are through the end the 2021–22 season.
- NCAA tournament appearances are from time at current school only.
- NCAA Final Fours and Championship include time at other schools.

== Postseason ==
=== Pac-12 tournament ===
The conference tournament was played in March 8−11, 2023 at the T-Mobile Arena in Paradise, NV. The top four teams received a bye on the first day. Teams were seeded by conference record, with ties broken by record between the tied teams followed by record against the regular-season champion, if necessary.

First round Wednesday, March 8
8 | Washington | 68
9 | Colorado | 74
5 | Washington State | 69
12 | California | 52
7 | Utah | 62
10 | Stanford | 73
6 | Arizona State | 63
11 | Oregon State | 57

Quarterfinals; Thursday, March 9
1 | #2 UCLA | 80
9 | Colorado | 69
4 | Oregon | 75
5 | Washington State | 70
2 | #8 Arizona | 95
10 | Stanford | 84
3 | USC | 72
6 | Arizona State | 77

Semifinals; Friday, March 10
1 | #2 UCLA | 75
4 | Oregon | 56
2 | #8 Arizona | 78
6 | Arizona State | 59

Championship; Saturday, March 11
1 | #2 UCLA | 59
2 | #8 Arizona | 61

* denotes overtime period

=== All-Tournament Team ===
| Name | Pos. | Height | Weight | Year | Team |
|---|---|---|---|---|---|
| Ąžuolas Tubelis | Power forward | 6–11 | 245 | Junior | Arizona |
| Oumar Ballo | Center | 7−0 | 260 | RS-Junior | Arizona |
| Jaime Jaquez Jr. | Small forward | 6−7 | 225 | Senior | UCLA |
| Tyger Campbell | Point guard | 5−11 | 180 | Senior | UCLA |
| Amari Bailey | Shooting guard | 6−5 | 185 | Freshman | UCLA |
| Desmond Cambridge Jr. | Shooting guard | 6−4 | 180 | Graduate Senior | Arizona State |

=== Most Outstanding Player ===
| Name | Pos. | Height | Weight | Year | Team |
|---|---|---|---|---|---|
| Ąžuolas Tubelis | PF | 6–11 | 245 | Junior | Arizona |

=== NCAA tournament ===
Four teams from the conference were selected to participate: Arizona, Arizona State, UCLA & USC.

| Seed | Region | School | First Four | 1st round | 2nd round | Sweet 16 | Elite Eight | Final Four | Championship |
|---|---|---|---|---|---|---|---|---|---|
| No. 2 | South Region | Arizona | - | lost to No. 15 Princeton 55−59 | - | - | - | - | - |
| No. 2 | West Region | UCLA | - | defeated No. 15 UNC Asheville 86−53 | defeated No. 7 Northwestern 68−63 | lost to No. 3 Gonzaga 76−79 | - | - | - |
| No. 10 | East Region | USC | - | lost to No. 7 Michigan State 62−72 | - | - | - | - | - |
| No. 11 | West Region | Arizona State | defeated No. 11 Nevada 98−73 | lost to No. 6 TCU 70−72 | - | - | - | - | - |
| | Bids | W-L (%): | 1–0 (1.000) | 1–3 (.250) | 1–0 (1.000) | 0–1 (.000) | 0–0 (–) | 0–0 (–) | TOTAL: 3–4 (.429) |

=== National Invitation Tournament ===
Three members from the conference were selected to participate: Colorado, Oregon & Washington State.

| Seed | Bracket | School | First Round | Second Round | Quarterfinals | Semifinals | Finals |
|---|---|---|---|---|---|---|---|
| 3 | Rutgers | Colorado | defeated Seton Hall 65−64 | lost Utah Valley 69−81 | − | − | − |
| 1 | Oregon | Oregon | defeated UC Irvine 84−58 | defeated UCF 68−54 | lost to Wisconsin 58−61 | − | − |
| 4 | Oklahoma State | Washington State | lost to Eastern Washington 65−64 | − | − | − | − |
| | Bid | W-L (%): | 2–1 (.667) | 1–1 (.500) | 0–1 (.000) | 0–0 (–) | TOTAL: 3–3 (.500) |

Index to colors and formatting
Pac-12 member won
Pac-12 member lost

== Awards and honors ==
=== Players of the Week ===
Throughout the regular season, the Pac-12 offices will honor 2 players based on performance by naming them player of the week and freshman of the week.

| Week | Player of the Week | School | Freshman of the Week | School | Ref. |
|---|---|---|---|---|---|
| Nov. 14 | KJ Simpson | Colorado | Jordan Pope | Oregon State | |
| Nov. 21 | Desmond Cambridge Jr. | Arizona State | Austin Nunez | Arizona State | |
| Nov. 28 | Oumar Ballo | Arizona | Amari Bailey | UCLA | |
| Dec. 5 | Rollie Worster | Utah | Amari Bailey (2) | UCLA | |
| Dec. 12 | Will Richardson | Oregon | Dylan Andrews | UCLA | |
| Dec. 19 | Jaime Jaquez Jr. | UCLA | Tre White | USC | |
| Dec. 26 | Ąžuolas Tubelis | Arizona | Grant Newell | California | |
| Jan. 2 | KJ Simpson (2) | Colorado | Adem Bona | UCLA | |
| Jan. 9 | Tristan da Silva | Colorado | Adem Bona (2) | UCLA | |
| Jan. 16 | Desmond Cambridge Jr.(2) | Arizona State | Koren Johnson | Washington | |
| Jan. 23 | Branden Carlson | Utah | Jordan Pope (2) | Oregon State | |
| Jan. 30 | Boogie Ellis | USC | Jordan Pope (3) | Oregon State | |
| Feb. 6 | Ąžuolas Tubelis (2) | Arizona | Tre White | USC | |
| Feb. 13 | Jaime Jaquez Jr. (2) | UCLA | Amari Bailey (3) | UCLA | |
| Feb. 20 | Boogie Ellis (2) | USC | Keyon Menifield | Washington | |
| Feb. 27 | Desmond Cambridge Jr.(3) | Arizona State | Amari Bailey (4) | UCLA | |
| Mar. 6 | Jaime Jaquez Jr. (3) | UCLA | Kylan Boswell | Arizona | |

==== Totals per School ====
| School | Total |
|---|---|
| UCLA | 10 |
| Arizona | 4 |
| Arizona State | 4 |
| USC | 4 |
| Colorado | 3 |
| Oregon State | 3 |
| Utah | 2 |
| Washington | 2 |
| California | 1 |
| Oregon | 1 |
| Stanford | 0 |
| Washington State | 0 |

=== National honors ===
==== All-Americans ====
| Player | School | Position | Selector | Consensus |
|---|---|---|---|---|
Second Team All-Americans
| Jaime Jaquez Jr. | UCLA | SF | AP, NABC, SN, USBWA, ESPN, John R. Wooden, SI | ✓ |
| Ąžuolas Tubelis | Arizona | PF | AP, NABC, SN, USBWA, ESPN, John R. Wooden, SI | ✓ |

AP Honorable Mention:

- Tyger Campbell, UCLA, Honorable mention (Associated Press)

*Associated Press All-America Team
*National Association of Basketball Coaches All-America Team
*Sporting News All-America Team
*USBWA All-America Team
*John R. Wooden
*ESPN
*Sports Illustrated

==== Awards ====
| Player | School | Position | Selector |
|---|---|---|---|
Award
| Jaylen Clark | UCLA | SG | NABC Defensive Player of the Year |
| Jaylen Clark | UCLA | SG | Naismith Defensive Player of the Year |
| Jaime Jaquez Jr. | UCLA | SG/SF | Lute Olson Award |

=== All-District ===
The United States Basketball Writers Association (USBWA) named the following from the Pac-12 to their All-District Teams:

District VIII

All-District Team

District IX

Player of the Year Jaime Jaquez Jr., UCLA

All-District Team

- Tyger Campbell, UCLA
- Boogie Ellis, USC
- Jaime Jaquez Jr., UCLA
- Ąžuolas Tubelis, Arizona

The National Association of Basketball Coaches (NABC) named the following from the Pac-12 to their All-District Teams:

District 19

First Team

- Oumar Ballo, Arizona
- Branden Carlson, Utah
- Boogie Ellis, USC
- Jaime Jaquez Jr., UCLA
- Ąžuolas Tubelis, Arizona

Second Team

- Desmond Cambridge Jr., Arizona State
- Tyger Campbell, UCLA
- N'Faly Dante, Oregon
- Mouhamed Gueye, Washington State
- Drew Peterson, USC

Coach of the Year Mick Cronin, UCLA

=== Pac-12 season awards ===
Pac-12 individual awards
| Award | Recipient(s) |
|---|---|
| Player of the Year | Jaime Jaquez Jr., UCLA |
| Coach of the Year | Mick Cronin, UCLA |
| Defensive Player of the Year | Jaylen Clark, UCLA |
| Freshman of the Year | Adem Bona, UCLA |
| Most Improved Player of the Year | Oumar Ballo, Arizona |
| Sixth Player of the Year | Reese Dixon-Waters, USC |
| Scholar-Athlete of the Year | James Keefe, Stanford |

==== All-Pac-12 ====
All-Pac-12 first team
| Name | School | Pos. | Yr. | Ht. | Hometown (Last School) |
|---|---|---|---|---|---|
| Oumar Ballo | Arizona | C | R-Jr. | 7−0, 260 | Koulikoro, Mali (Gonzaga) |
| Tyger Campbell††† | UCLA | G | R-Jr. | 5−11, 180 | Cedar Rapids, Iowa (La Lumiere School) |
| Branden Carlson | Utah | C | Sr. | 7−0, 228 | South Jordan, Utah (Bingham) |
| N'Faly Dante | Oregon | C | Sr. | 6−11, 230 | Bamako, Mali (Sunrise Christian Academy) |
| Tristan da Silva | Colorado | F | Jr. | 6−9, 217 | Munich, Germany (Ludwigsgymnasium Munich) |
| Boogie Ellis | USC | G | Sr. | 6−3, 185 | Camarillo, Calif. (Memphis) |
| Mouhamed Gueye | Washington State | F | So. | 6−1, 210 | Dakar, Senegal (Prolific Prep) |
| Jaime Jaquez Jr.‡†† | UCLA | G/F | Sr. | 6−7, 225 | Camarillo, Calif. (Camarillo HS) |
| Drew Peterson†† | USC | G | G-Sr. | 6−9, 205 | Libertyville, Ill. (Brother Rice High School) |
| Ąžuolas Tubelis†† | Arizona | F | Jr. | 6−11, 245 | Vilnius, Lithuania (Rytas Vilnius) |

- ‡ Pac-12 Player of the Year
- ††† three-time All-Pac-12 First Team honoree
- †† two-time All-Pac-12 First Team honoree

All-Pac-12 second team
| Name | School | Pos. | Yr. | Ht. | Hometown (Last School) |
|---|---|---|---|---|---|
| Keion Brooks Jr. | Washington | F | Sr. | 6−7, 210 | Fort Wayne, Ind. (Kentucky) |
| Desmond Cambridge Jr. | Arizona State | G | G-Sr. | 6−4, 180 | Nashville, Tenn. (Nevada) |
| Jaylen Clark | UCLA | G | Jr. | 6−5, 205 | Riverside, Calif. (Etiwanda) |
| Spencer Jones | Stanford | F | Sr . | 6−7, 225 | Roeland Park, Kan. (Bishop Miege) |
| KJ Simpson | Colorado | G | So. | 6−2, 175 | West Hills, Calif. (Chaminade) |

Honorable Mention

- TJ Bamba, (Washington State, G)
- Adem Bona, (UCLA, F)
- Courtney Ramey, (Arizona, G)
- Will Richardson, (Oregon, G)

==== All-Freshman Team ====
| Name | School | Pos. | Ht. |
|---|---|---|---|
| Amari Bailey | UCLA | G | 6−5,185 |
| Adem Bona‡ | UCLA | F | 6−10, 235 |
| Keyon Menifield | Washington | G | 6−1, 150 |
| Jordan Pope | Oregon State | G | 6−2, 165 |
| Tre White | USC | G | 6−7, 210 |

‡ Pac-12 Freshman of the Year

Honorable Mention

- Kylan Boswell, (Arizona, G)
- Grant Newell, (California, F)

==== All-Defensive Team ====
| Name | School | Pos. | Yr. | Ht. |
|---|---|---|---|---|
| Adem Bona | UCLA | F | Fr. | 6−10, 235 |
| Jaylen Clark‡†† | UCLA | G | Jr. | 6−5, 205 |
| Kobe Johnson | USC | G | So. | 6−6, 200 |
| Braxton Meah | Washington | C | Jr. | 7−1, 250 |
| Joshua Morgan | USC | F | R-Jr . | 6−11, 235 |

- ‡Pac-12 Defensive Player of the Year
- †† two-time Pac-12 All-Defensive Team honoree

Honorable Mention

- Marco Anthony, (Utah, G)
- Oumar Ballo, (Arizona, G)
- Mouhamed Gueye, (Washington State, F)
- Warren Washington, (Arizona State, F)

==== Scholar Athlete of the year ====
The Pac-12 moved to seasonal Academic Honor Rolls, discontinuing sport-by-sport teams, starting in 2019-20

| Name | School | Pos. | Ht., Wt. | GPA | Major |
|---|---|---|---|---|---|
| James Keefe | Stanford | F | 6−9, 240 | 3.86 | Economics |

== 2022–23 Season statistic leaders ==
Scoring leaders
| Rk | Player | PTS | PPG |
|---|---|---|---|
| 1 | Ąžuolas Tubelis | 672 | 19.8 |
| 2 | Jaime Jaquez Jr. | 659 | 17.8 |
| 3 | Keion Brooks Jr. | 531 | 17.7 |
| 3 | Boogie Ellis | 583 | 17.7 |
| 5 | Branden Carlson | 507 | 16.4 |

Rebound leaders
| Rk | Player | REB | RPG |
|---|---|---|---|
| 1 | Ąžuolas Tubelis | 320 | 9.1 |
| 2 | Oumar Ballo | 302 | 8.6 |
| 3 | N'Faly Dante | 260 | 8.4 |
| 3 | Mouhamed Gueye | 276 | 8.4 |
| 5 | Jaime Jaquez Jr. | 304 | 8.2 |

Field goal leaders (avg 5 fga/gm)
| Rk | Player | FG | FGA | PCT |
|---|---|---|---|---|
| 1 | Braxton Meah | 108 | 153 | 70.6% |
| 2 | Adem Bona | 104 | 154 | 67.5% |
| 3 | Oumar Ballo | 189 | 292 | 64.7% |
| 4 | N'Faly Dante | 172 | 280 | 61.4% |
| 5 | Ąžuolas Tubelis | 274 | 481 | 57.0% |

Assist leaders
| Rk | Player | AST | APG |
|---|---|---|---|
| 1 | Kerr Kriisa | 180 | 5.1 |
| 1 | Will Richardson | 168 | 5.1 |
| 3 | Rollie Worster | 149 | 5.0 |
| 3 | Tyger Campbell | 186 | 5.0 |
| 5 | Drew Peterson | 146 | 4.3 |

Block leaders
| Rk | Player | BLK | BPG |
|---|---|---|---|
| 1 | Joshua Morgan | 63 | 2.2 |
| 2 | Branden Carlson | 63 | 2.0 |
| 3 | Warren Washington | 60 | 1.8 |
| 3 | Adem Bona | 57 | 1.7 |
| 5 | Braxton Meah | 50 | 1.6 |

Free throw leaders
| Rk | Player | FT | FTA | PCT |
|---|---|---|---|---|
| 1 | Tyger Campbell | 101 | 118 | 85.6% |
| 2 | Kobe Johnson | 69 | 82 | 84.1% |
| 3 | Pelle Larsson | 111 | 133 | 83.5% |
| 4 | Kuany Kuany | 93 | 113 | 82.3% |
| 5 | KJ Simpson | 107 | 131 | 81.7% |

Steal leaders
| Rk | Player | STL | SPG |
|---|---|---|---|
| 1 | Jaylen Clark | 78 | 2.6 |
| 2 | Kobe Johnson | 72 | 2.2 |
| 3 | Desmond Cambridge Jr. | 57 | 1.7 |
| 4 | Jaime Jaquez Jr. | 57 | 1.5 |
| 4 | KJ Simpson | 49 | 1.5 |

Three point leaders
| Rk | Player | 3P | 3PA | % |
|---|---|---|---|---|
| 1 | Jabe Mullins | 55 | 128 | 43.0% |
| 2 | Justin Powell | 78 | 183 | 42.6% |
| 3 | David Singleton | 73 | 172 | 42.4% |
| 4 | Courtney Ramey | 83 | 206 | 40.3% |
| 5 | Cedric Henderson | 37 | 92 | 40.2% |

== 2023 NBA draft ==
| Round | Pick | Player | Position | Nationality | Team | School/club team |
|---|---|---|---|---|---|---|
| 1 | 18 | Jaime Jaquez Jr. | SF | United States | Miami Heat | UCLA (Sr.) |
| 2 | 39 | Mouhamed Gueye | PF | Senegal | Charlotte Hornets | Washington State (So.) |
| 2 | 41 | Amari Bailey | SG | United States | Charlotte Hornets | UCLA (Fr.) |
| 2 | 53 | Jaylen Clark | SG | United States | Minnesota Timberwolves | UCLA (Jr.) |

== Home game attendance ==
| Team | Stadium | Capacity | Game 1 | Game 2 | Game 3 | Game 4 | Game 5 | Game 6 | Game 7 | Game 8 | Game 9 | Game 10 | Game 11 | Game 12 | Game 13 | Game 14 | Game 15 | Game 16 | Game 17 | Game 18 | Total | Average | % of Capacity | |
|---|---|---|---|---|---|---|---|---|---|---|---|---|---|---|---|---|---|---|---|---|---|---|---|---|
| Arizona | McKale Center | 14,644 | 12,635 | 13,485 | 12,752 | 14,352 | 13,854 | **14,688**† | 13,606 | 14,021 | 13,562 | 14,176 | **14,688**† | **14,688**† | **14,688**† | **14,688**† | **14,688**† | **14,688**† | **14,688**† | | 239,947 | 14,115 | 96.38% | |
| Arizona State | Desert Financial Arena | 14,198 | 6,304 | 6,925 | 6,263 | 5,263 | 7,243 | 6,336 | 12,582 | 5,860 | 7,020 | 13,363† | 10,505 | 8,032 | 9,815 | 7,501 | 8,046 | | | | 121,058 | 8,071 | 56.84% | |
| California | Haas Pavilion | 11,858 | 3,128 | 3,607 | 1,364 | 1,211 | 3,648† | 1,297 | 2,040 | 1,130 | 1,468 | 1,253 | 3,648† | 2,341 | 2,072 | 3,289 | 2,088 | 1,329 | 1,725 | | 36,638 | 2,155 | 18.17% | |
| Colorado | Coors Events Center | 11,064 | 5,388 | 5,780 | 6,917 | 10,033† | 5,125 | 6,015 | 5,108 | 6,325 | 6,203 | 6,974 | 6,712 | 6,974 | 6,638 | 8,680 | 8,432 | | | | 101,304 | 6,754 | 61.04% | |
| Oregon | Matthew Knight Arena | 12,364 | 5,897 | 6,454 | 5,347 | 7,002 | 5,379 | 5,416 | 4,738 | 5,074 | 5,064 | 7,001 | 5,955 | 7,970 | 5,680 | 8,228† | 7,005 | 10,272 | 5,908 | 7,458 | 115,848 | 6,436 | 52.05% | |
| Oregon State | Gill Coliseum | 9,604 | 3,320 | 4,778 | 2,973 | 3,482 | 3,303 | 2,537 | 2,581 | 2,617 | 4,126 | 3,789 | 3,252 | 3,789 | 3,524 | 3,796 | 7,270† | 3,122 | 3,390 | | 61,649 | 3,626 | 37.76% | |
| Stanford | Maples Pavilion | 7,233 | 3,380 | 3,945 | 2,263 | 4,848 | 2,583 | 2,640 | 2,759 | 2,782 | 3,542 | 2,406 | 5,112 | 3,923 | 5,313† | 2,530 | 4,738 | | | | 52,764 | 3,518 | 48.63% | |
| UCLA | Pauley Pavilion | 13,800 | 6,096 | 9,811 | 6,056 | 8,107 | 6,001 | 8,093 | 6,459 | 7,421 | 13,659 | 11,771 | 8,106 | 8,309 | 10,117 | 10,241 | 13,659 | 10,132 | 13,659 | | 157,697 | 9,276 | 67.21% | |
| USC | Galen Center | 10,258 | 2,355 | 2,076 | 1,838 | 1,590 | 3,273 | 1,531 | 1,835 | 4,517 | 3,178 | 4,671 | 9,605† | 3,751 | 5,706 | 3,698 | 5,374 | 7,043 | 10,258 | | 72,799 | 4,253 | 41.46% | |
| Utah | Jon M. Huntsman Center | 15,000 | 5,878 | 6,283 | 6,328 | 5,503 | 5,109 | 6,495 | 5,295 | 5,223 | 6,471 | 8,235 | 6,599 | 7,815 | 7,318 | 6,731 | 6,133 | 8,497 | 10,134† | | 114,047 | 6,709 | 44.72% | |
| Washington | Alaska Airlines Arena | 10,000 | 6,445 | 6,786 | 5,401 | 5,666 | 7,261 | 4,888 | 5,733 | 8,502 | 7,690 | 7,494 | 5,692 | 6,297 | 7,332 | 9,268† | 7,079 | 7,512 | 9,268 | | 118,314 | 6,960 | 69.60% | |
| Washington State | Beasley Coliseum | 11,671 | 2,443 | 3,275 | 2,009 | 2,268 | 3,238 | 2,650 | 3,208 | 3,590 | 5,225 | 4,120 | 5,647† | 2,691 | 4,467 | | | | | | 44,831 | 3,449 | 28.74% | |
| Total | | 11,835 | | | | | | | | | | | | | | | | | | | 1,236,537 | 6,341 | 53.58% | - |

Bold – At or exceed capacity
†Season high

== See also ==
- 2022–23 Pac-12 Conference women's basketball season
