= 2022–23 Washington State Cougars men's basketball team =

Sports team season

2022–23 Washington State Cougars men's basketball

NIT, First round
- Conference: Pac-12 Conference
- Record: 17–17 (11–9 Pac-12)
- Head coach: Kyle Smith (4th season)
- Assistant coaches: Jim Shaw; John Andrejek; Wayne Hunter
- Home arena: Beasley Coliseum

2022–23 Pac-12 Conference men's basketball standings
	Conf.				Overall
Team	W		L	PCT	W		L	PCT
No. 7 UCLA	18	–	2	.900	31	–	6	.838
No. 8 Arizona†	14	–	6	.700	28	–	7	.800
USC	14	–	6	.700	22	–	11	.667
Oregon	12	–	8	.600	21	–	15	.583
Arizona State	11	–	9	.550	23	–	13	.639
Washington State	11	–	9	.550	17	–	17	.500
Utah	10	–	10	.500	17	–	15	.531
Washington	8	–	12	.400	16	–	16	.500
Colorado	8	–	12	.400	18	–	17	.514
Stanford	7	–	13	.350	14	–	19	.424
Oregon State	5	–	15	.250	11	–	21	.344
California	2	–	18	.100	3	–	29	.094
† Conference tournament winner Rankings from AP poll

The 2022–23 Washington State Cougars men's basketball team represented Washington State University during the 2022–23 NCAA Division I men's basketball season. The team was led by fourth-year head coach Kyle Smith. The Cougars played their home games at the Beasley Coliseum in Pullman, Washington as members of the Pac-12 Conference. They finished the season 16–15, 11–9 in Pac-12 play, to finish in a tie for fifth place. They defeated California in the first round of the Pac-12 tournament before losing to Oregon in the second round. They received an invitation to participate in the NIT, where they were defeated by Eastern Washington in the first round.

== Previous season ==
The Cougars finished the 2021–22 season 22–15, 11–9 in Pac-12 play, to finish in a three-way tie for fifth place. They defeated California in the first round of the Pac-12 tournament before losing to UCLA in the quarterfinals. They received an at-large bid to the NIT as a 4th seed in the SMU bracket, where they defeated Santa Clara, SMU and BYU to advance to the semifinals, where they lost to Texas A&M.

== Offseason ==
=== Departures ===
Name	Number	Pos.	Height	Weight	Year	Hometown	Reason for departure
Efe Abogidi	0	C	6'10"	225	Sophomore	Delta State, Nigeria	Declared for 2022 NBA draft
Tyrell Roberts	2	G	5'11"	175	RS junior	Sacramento, CA	Transferred to San Francisco
Jefferson Koulibaly	3	G	6'3"	185	RS freshman	Montreal, QC	Transferred to SMU
Michael Flowers	12	G	6'1"	190	GS senior	Southfield, MI	Graduated
Matt DeWolf	14	F	6'9"	235	GS senior	Barrington, RI	Graduated
Ryan Rapp	22	G	6'5"	189	Junior	Melbourne, Australia	Transferred to Hawaii
Noah Williams	24	G	6'5"	195	Junior	Seattle, WA	Transferred to Washington
Tony Miller	32	F	6'6"	215	GS senior	Woodinville, WA	Graduate transferred
Will Burghardt	33	G	5'11"	185	GS senior	Longview, WA	Walk-on; graduated

=== Incoming transfers ===
Name	Num	Pos.	Height	Weight	Year	Hometown	Previous school
Jabe Mullins	3	G	6'5"	190	Junior	Snoqualmie, WA	Saint Mary's
Justin Powell	24	G	6'6"	197	Junior	Prospect, KY	Tennessee

=== 2022 recruiting class ===
College recruiting
Name	Hometown	School	Height	Weight	Commit date
Adrame Diongue; C	Chandler, AZ	AZ Compass Prep	7 ft 0 in (2.13 m)	190 lb (86 kg)	May 2, 2022
Adrame Diongue; C	Recruit ratings: Scout: Rivals: 247Sports: ESPN:				
Dylan Darling; PG	Spokane, WA	Central Valley High School	6 ft 2 in (1.88 m)	175 lb (79 kg)	Mar 24, 2022
Dylan Darling; PG	Recruit ratings: Scout: Rivals: 247Sports: ESPN:				
Mael Crespin; C	Paris, France	N/A	6 ft 9 in (2.06 m)	235 lb (107 kg)	Jun 3, 2022
Mael Crespin; C	Recruit ratings: Scout: Rivals: 247Sports: ESPN:				
Solomon Ominu; C	Bridgton, ME	Bridgton Academy	6 ft 10 in (2.08 m)	230 lb (100 kg)	Sep 8, 2021
Solomon Ominu; C	Recruit ratings: Scout: Rivals: 247Sports: ESPN:				
Overall recruit ranking:
Note: In many cases, Scout, Rivals, 247Sports, On3, and ESPN may conflict in their listings of height and weight.; In these cases, the average was taken. ESPN grades are on a 100-point scale.; Sources: "2022 Washington State Commits". Rivals.; "Men's Basketball Recruiting". Scout.; "ESPN- Washington State Cougars Men's Basketball Recruiting". ESPN.; "Scout.com Team Recruiting Rankings". Scout.; "2022 Team Ranking". Rivals.

== Roster ==
2022–23 Washington State Cougars men's basketball team
Players
Coaches

Pos.	#	Name	Height	Weight	Year	Previous school	Hometown
G	0	Ben Olesen (W)	6 ft 0 in (1.83 m)	160 lb (73 kg)	RS Sr	Jackson HS	Mill Creek, WA
G	2	Myles Rice	6 ft 2 in (1.88 m)	175 lb (79 kg)	RS Fr	Sandy Creek HS	Columbia, SC
G	3	Jabe Mullins	6 ft 6 in (1.98 m)	192 lb (87 kg)	Jr	Saint Mary's	Snoqualmie, WA
G	4	Shae Korpela (W)	6 ft 5 in (1.96 m)	180 lb (82 kg)	Fr	Aspen HS	Aspen, CO
G	5	TJ Bamba	6 ft 5 in (1.96 m)	215 lb (98 kg)	Jr	Abraham Lincoln HS	The Bronx, NY
C	10	Dishon Jackson	6 ft 10 in (2.08 m)	250 lb (113 kg)	Jr	St. Patrick-St. Vincent HS	Oakland, CA
F	11	DJ Rodman	6 ft 6 in (1.98 m)	215 lb (98 kg)	Sr	JSerra Catholic HS	Newport Beach, CA
F	12	Mael Hamon-Crespin	6 ft 9 in (2.06 m)	235 lb (107 kg)	Fr	N/A	Paris, France
F	13	Carlos Rosario	6 ft 7 in (2.01 m)	180 lb (82 kg)	Jr	Veritas Prep	Santo Domingo, DR
G	14	Braden Korpela (W)	6 ft 5 in (1.96 m)	170 lb (77 kg)	Fr	Aspen HS	Aspen, CO
C	15	Adrame Diongue	7 ft 0 in (2.13 m)	190 lb (86 kg)	Fr	AZ Compass Prep	Dakar, Senegal
C	21	Jack Wilson	6 ft 11 in (2.11 m)	310 lb (141 kg)	Sr	Junípero Serra High School	Montara, CA
G	22	Dylan Darling	6 ft 2 in (1.88 m)	175 lb (79 kg)	Fr	Central Valley HS	Spokane, WA
F	23	Andrej Jakimovski	6 ft 8 in (2.03 m)	215 lb (98 kg)	Jr	Reale Mutua Torino	Skopje, Macedonia
G	24	Justin Powell	6 ft 6 in (1.98 m)	197 lb (89 kg)	Jr	Tennessee	Prospect, KY
G	31	Kymany Houinsou	6 ft 6 in (1.98 m)	195 lb (88 kg)	Fr	Asvel	Mulhouse, France
F	35	Mouhamed Gueye	6 ft 11 in (2.11 m)	210 lb (95 kg)	So	Prolific Prep	Dakar, Senegal

Head coach

- Kyle Smith (Hamilton)

Assistant coach(es)

- Jim Shaw (Western Oregon)
- John Andrejek (Columbia)
- Wayne Hunter (Saint Mary's)

Legend

- (C) Team captain
- (S) Suspended
- (I) Ineligible
- (W) Walk-on
- Injured
- Current redshirt

Roster
Last update: April 4, 2024

== Schedule and results ==
Date time, TV	Rank^{#}	Opponent^{#}	Result	Record	High points	High rebounds	High assists	Site (attendance) city, state
Regular season
November 7, 2022*; 4:30 p.m., P12N		Texas State	W 83–61	1–0	18 – Gueye	13 – Gueye	12 – Powell	Beasley Coliseum (2,443); Pullman, WA
November 12, 2022*; 4:00 p.m., Stadium		vs. Boise State; ICCU Capital City Classic	L 61–71	1–1	24 – Bamba	14 – Rodman	1 – tied	Idaho Central Arena (4,157); Boise, ID
November 15, 2022*; 4:00 p.m., P12N		at Prairie View A&M; Pac-12/SWAC Legacy Series	L 59–70	1–2	16 – Bamba	5 – tied	2 – Mullins	William J. Nicks Building (863); Prairie View, TX
November 21, 2022*; 6:00 p.m., P12N		vs. Eastern Washington	W 82–56	2–2	24 – Mullins	8 – Gueye	7 – Powell	Spokane Arena (5,224); Spokane, WA
November 25, 2022*; 1:00 p.m., P12N		Detroit Mercy	W 96–54	3–2	22 – Mullins	8 – Gueye	7 – Powell	Beasley Coliseum (3,275); Pullman, WA
December 1, 2022; 7:30 p.m., P12N		at Oregon	L 60–74	3–3 (0–1)	19 – Gueye	5 – Gueye	4 – Powell	Matthew Knight Arena (5,379); Eugene, OR
December 4, 2022; 1:00 p.m., ESPNU		Utah	L 65–67	3–4 (0–2)	20 – Gueye	11 – Gueye	2 – tied	Beasley Coliseum (2,009); Pullman, WA
December 7, 2022*; 6:00 p.m., P12N		Northern Kentucky	W 68–47	4–4	20 – Bamba	10 – Gueye	4 – tied	Beasley Coliseum (2,268); Pullman, WA
December 10, 2022*; 1:30 p.m., FS1		vs. UNLV; Las Vegas Clash	L 70–74	4–5	20 – Bamba	8 – Gueye	4 – Gueye	MGM Grand Garden Arena; Paradise, NV
December 18, 2022*; 7:00 p.m., ESPN2		vs. No. 11 Baylor; Pac-12 Coast-to-Coast Challenge	L 59–65	4–6	16 – Mullins	9 – Gueye	4 – Houinsou	American Airlines Center (4,200); Dallas, TX
December 22, 2022*; 6:00 p.m., ESPN2		vs. George Washington; Diamond Head Classic quarterfinals	W 66–64	5–6	21 – Gueye	10 – Gueye	4 – Rodman	Stan Sheriff Center; Honolulu, HI
December 23, 2022*; 8:59 p.m., ESPN2		at Hawai'i; Diamond Head Classic semifinal	L 51–62	5–7	19 – Bamba	8 – Diongue	1 – tied	Stan Sheriff Center (4,683); Honolulu, HI
December 25, 2022*; 3:30 p.m., ESPN2		vs. Utah State; Diamond Head Classic 3rd-place game	L 73–82	5–8	22 – Gueye	12 – Gueye	4 – Bamba	Stan Sheriff Center; Honolulu, HI
December 30, 2022; 8:00 p.m., P12N		No. 11 UCLA	L 66–67	5–9 (0–3)	19 – Rodman	18 – Gueye	3 – Mullins	Beasley Coliseum (3,238); Pullman, WA
January 1, 2023; 12:00 p.m., P12N		USC	W 81–71	6–9 (1–3)	16 – tied	6 – tied	7 – Powell	Beasley Coliseum (2,650); Pullman, WA
January 5, 2023; 5:00 p.m., P12N		at Arizona State	L 71–77	6–10 (1–4)	19 – Mullins	12 – Rodman	5 – Gueye	Desert Financial Arena (5,860); Tempe, AZ
January 7, 2023; 2:00 pm., P12N		at No. 5 Arizona	W 74–61	7–10 (2–4)	24 – Gueye	14 – Gueye	3 – tied	McKale Center (14,176); Tucson, AZ
January 11, 2023; 8:00 p.m., ESPNU		California	W 66–51	8–10 (3–4)	14 – tied	6 – Rodman	3 – tied	Beasley Coliseum (3,208); Pullman, WA
January 14, 2023; 5:00 p.m., P12N		Stanford	W 60–59	9–10 (4–4)	17 – Jakimovski	5 – Diongue	4 – Houinsou	Beasley Coliseum (3,590); Pullman, WA
January 19, 2023; 6:00 p.m., P12N		at Utah	L 63–77	9–11 (4–5)	20 – Gueye	8 – Rodman	4 – Powell	Jon M. Huntsman Center (6,599); Salt Lake City, UT
January 22, 2023; 3:00 p.m., ESPNU		at Colorado	L 55–58	9–12 (4–6)	18 – Bamba	7 – Jakimovski	2 – tied	CU Events Center; Boulder, CO
January 26, 2023; 8:00 p.m., P12N		No. 6 Arizona	L 58–63	9–13 (4–7)	15 – tied	10 – Gueye	3 – Powell	Beasley Coliseum (5,225); Pullman, WA
January 28, 2023; 5:00 p.m., ESPNU		Arizona State	W 75–58	10–13 (5–7)	22 – Jakimovski	15 – Gueye	3 – tied	Beasley Coliseum (4,120); Pullman, WA
February 2, 2023; 8:00 p.m., FS1		at USC	L 70–80	10–14 (5–8)	31 – Gueye	12 – Gueye	5 – tied	Galen Center (3,751); Los Angeles, CA
February 4, 2023; 4:00 p.m., P12N		at No. 9 UCLA	L 52–76	10–15 (5–9)	19 – Bamba	6 – tied	4 – Houinsou	Pauley Pavilion (10,117); Los Angeles, CA
February 11, 2023; 7:30 p.m., P12N		Washington; Rivalry	W 56–51	11–15 (6–9)	20 – Bamba	15 – Gueye	4 – Powell	Beasley Coliseum (5,647); Pullman, WA
February 16, 2023; 8:00 p.m., ESPNU		Oregon State	W 80–62	12–15 (7–9)	21 – Gueye	8 – Jakimovski	4 – tied	Beasley Coliseum (2,961); Pullman, WA
February 19, 2023; 4:00 p.m., FS1		Oregon	W 68–65	13–15 (8–9)	18 – Gueye	12 – Gueye	4 – Mullins	Beasley Coliseum (4,467); Pullman, WA
February 23, 2023; 8:00 p.m., P12N		at Stanford	W 67–63	14–15 (9–9)	22 – Bamba	15 – Gueye	5 – Powell	Maples Pavilion (2,530); Stanford, CA
February 25, 2023; 2:00 p.m., P12N		at California	W 63–57	15–15 (10–9)	20 – Gueye	10 – Gueye & Rodman	3 – Gueye	Haas Pavilion (1,725); Berkeley, CA
March 2, 2023; 8:00 p.m., ESPNU		at Washington; Rivalry	W 93–84	16–15 (11–9)	36 – Bamba	17 – Jakimovski	5 – Rodman	Alaska Airlines Arena (9,268); Seattle, WA
Pac-12 tournament
March 8, 2023; 2:30 p.m., P12N	(5)	vs. (12) California; First round	W 69–52	17–15	17 – Bamba	11 – Rodman	4 – Gueye	T-Mobile Arena (10,406); Paradise, NV
March 9, 2023; 2:30 p.m., P12N	(5)	vs. (4) Oregon; Quarterfinals	L 70–75	17–16	19 – Bamba	7 – Powell	5 – Bamba	T-Mobile Arena (10,406); Paradise, NV
NIT
March 14, 2023*; 8:00 p.m., ESPNU	(4)	Eastern Washington; First round – Oklahoma State bracket	L 74–81	17–17	23 – Rodman	8 – Rodman	3 – tied	Beasley Coliseum (1,671); Pullman, WA
*Non-conference game. ^{#}Rankings from AP Poll. (#) Tournament seedings in parentheses. All times are in Pacific Time.
