= 2022–23 USC Trojans men's basketball team =

American college basketball season

2022–23 USC Trojans men's basketball

NCAA tournament, First Round
- Conference: Pac-12 Conference
- Record: 22–11 (14–6 Pac-12)
- Head coach: Andy Enfield (10th season)
- Assistant coaches: Chris Capko (7th season); Eric Mobley (5th season); Jay Morris (2nd season)
- Home arena: Galen Center (Capacity: 10,258)

2022–23 Pac-12 Conference men's basketball standings
	Conf.				Overall
Team	W		L	PCT	W		L	PCT
No. 7 UCLA	18	–	2	.900	31	–	6	.838
No. 8 Arizona†	14	–	6	.700	28	–	7	.800
USC	14	–	6	.700	22	–	11	.667
Oregon	12	–	8	.600	21	–	15	.583
Arizona State	11	–	9	.550	23	–	13	.639
Washington State	11	–	9	.550	17	–	17	.500
Utah	10	–	10	.500	17	–	15	.531
Washington	8	–	12	.400	16	–	16	.500
Colorado	8	–	12	.400	18	–	17	.514
Stanford	7	–	13	.350	14	–	19	.424
Oregon State	5	–	15	.250	11	–	21	.344
California	2	–	18	.100	3	–	29	.094
† Conference tournament winner Rankings from AP poll

The 2022–23 USC Trojans men's basketball team represented the University of Southern California during the 2022–23 NCAA Division I men's basketball season. The Trojans were led by 10th-year head coach Andy Enfield and played their home games at the Galen Center for the 16th season in Los Angeles, California as members of the Pac-12 Conference. They finished the season 22–11, 14–6 in Pac-12 Play to finish in 4th place. They lost in the quarterfinals of the Pac-12 Tournament to Arizona State. They received an at-large bid to the NCAA Tournament where they lost in the First Round to Michigan State.

== Previous season ==
The USC Trojans finished the 2021–22 season 26–8, 14–6 in Pac-12 Play to finish in third place. As the No. 3 seed in the Pac-12 tournament, they defeated Washington in the quarterfinals before losing in the semifinals to UCLA. They received an at-large bid to the NCAA tournament as the No. 7 seed in the Midwest Region, where they lost in the first round to Miami (FL).

== Off-season ==
=== Departures ===
Name	Num	Pos.	Height	Weight	Year	Hometown	Reason for departure
Chevez Goodwin	1	F	6'9"	225	RS Senior	Columbia, SC	Graduated/Signed to play professionally with Aris B.C.
Isaiah Mobley	3	F	6'10"	240	Junior	Murrieta, CA	Declare for 2022 NBA draft
Isaiah White	5	G	6'7"	210	RS Senior	Rancho Cucamonga, CA	Graduated
Boubacar Coulibaly	12	F	6'10"	215	Sophomore	Bamako, Mali	Transferred to Pepperdine
Ethan Anderson	20	G	6'1"	210	Junior	Los Angeles, CA	Transferred to Wyoming
Max Agbonkpolo	23	F	6'9"	195	Junior	Laguna Niguel, CA	Transferred to Wyoming
Reggie Parris	32	G	6'4"	190	Senior	Denver, CO	Walk-on; graduated
Amar Ross	55	G	5'8"	150	Senior	Long Beach, CA	Walk-on; graduated

=== 2022 recruiting class ===
College recruiting information
Name	Hometown	School	Height	Weight	Commit date
Vince Iwuchukwu #4 C	Nigeria	Montverde Academy (FL)	7 ft 0 in (2.13 m)	220 lb (100 kg)	Sep 17, 2021
Vince Iwuchukwu #4 C	Recruit ratings: Rivals: 247Sports: ESPN: (92)				
Kijani Wright #5 PF	Los Angeles, CA	Sierra Canyon (CA)	6 ft 9 in (2.06 m)	235 lb (107 kg)	Aug 11, 2021
Kijani Wright #5 PF	Recruit ratings: Rivals: 247Sports: ESPN: (88)				
Tre White #18 SF	Napa, CA	Prolific Prep (CA)	6 ft 6 in (1.98 m)	190 lb (86 kg)	Nov 6, 2021
Tre White #18 SF	Recruit ratings: Rivals: 247Sports: ESPN: (88)				
Oziyah Sellers #24 SG	Modesto, CA	Southern California Academy (CA)	6 ft 5 in (1.96 m)	160 lb (73 kg)	Aug 15, 2021
Oziyah Sellers #24 SG	Recruit ratings: Rivals: 247Sports: ESPN: (81)				
Overall recruit ranking:
Note: In many cases, Scout, Rivals, 247Sports, On3, and ESPN may conflict in their listings of height and weight.; In these cases, the average was taken. ESPN grades are on a 100-point scale.; Sources: "USC 2022 Basketball Commitments". Rivals.; "2022 USC Trojans Recruiting Class". ESPN.; "2022 Team Ranking". Rivals.

== Roster ==
2022–23 USC Trojans men's basketball team
Players
Coaches

Pos.	#	Name	Height	Weight	Year	Previous school	Hometown
F	0	Kobe Johnson	6 ft 6 in (1.98 m)	200 lb (91 kg)	So	Nicolet HS	Milwaukee, WI
G	1	Malik Thomas	6 ft 5 in (1.96 m)	210 lb (95 kg)	So	Damien HS	Fontana, CA
G	2	Reese Dixon-Waters	6 ft 5 in (1.96 m)	210 lb (95 kg)	Jr	St. Bernard HS	Long Beach, CA
C	3	Vince Iwuchukwu	7 ft 1 in (2.16 m)	235 lb (107 kg)	Fr	Southern California Academy	San Antonio, TX
G	4	Oziyah Sellers	6 ft 5 in (1.96 m)	185 lb (84 kg)	Fr	Southern California Academy	Hayward, CA
G	5	Boogie Ellis	6 ft 3 in (1.91 m)	185 lb (84 kg)	Sr	Memphis	San Diego, CA
G	13	Drew Peterson	6 ft 9 in (2.06 m)	205 lb (93 kg)	GS	Rice	Libertyville, IL
G	15	Zach Brooker (W)	6 ft 0 in (1.83 m)	160 lb (73 kg)	Jr	Sierra Canyon School	Calabasas, CA
G	22	Tre White	6 ft 7 in (2.01 m)	210 lb (95 kg)	Fr	Prolific Prep	Dallas, TX
F	24	Joshua Morgan	6 ft 11 in (2.11 m)	235 lb (107 kg)	RS Jr	Long Beach State	Sacramento, CA
F	30	Harrison Hornery	6 ft 10 in (2.08 m)	230 lb (104 kg)	So	Mater Dei HS	Toowoomba, Australia
F	33	Kijani Wright	6 ft 9 in (2.06 m)	235 lb (107 kg)	Fr	Sierra Canyon	Los Angeles, CA
F	55	Iaroslav Niagu	7 ft 0 in (2.13 m)	215 lb (98 kg)	Fr	Krasnodar Territory Boarding School	Krasnodar, Russia

Head coach

- Andy Enfield (Johns Hopkins)

Assistant coach(es)

- Chris Capko (South Florida)
- Eric Mobley (Portland)
- Jay Morris (Cal State Dominguez Hills)

Legend

- (C) Team captain
- (S) Suspended
- (I) Ineligible
- (W) Walk-on
- Injured
- Current redshirt

Roster
Last update: August 10, 2022

== Schedule and results ==
Date time, TV	Rank^{#}	Opponent^{#}	Result	Record	High points	High rebounds	High assists	Site (attendance) city, state
Regular season
November 7, 2022*; 6:30 p.m., P12N		Florida Gulf Coast	L 61–74	0–1	19 – Ellis	9 – Tied	6 – Peterson	Galen Center (2,355); Los Angeles, CA
November 10, 2022*; 8:00 p.m., P12N		Alabama State; Pac-12/SWAC Legacy Series	W 96–58	1–1	21 – Peterson	12 – White	6 – Tied	Galen Center (2,076); Los Angeles, CA
November 15, 2022*; 8:00 p.m., P12N		Vermont	W 59–57	2–1	20 – Peterson	10 – White	8 – Peterson	Galen Center (1,838); Los Angeles, CA
November 18, 2022*; 8:00 p.m., P12N		Mount St. Mary's	W 83–74	3–1	19 – Ellis	12 – Morgan	12 – Peterson	Galen Center (1,590); Los Angeles, CA
November 23, 2022*; 2:00 p.m., ESPN2		vs. BYU; Battle 4 Atlantis Quarterfinals	W 82–76	4–1	27 – Ellis	10 – Tied	6 – Peterson	Imperial Arena (465); Nassau, BAH
November 24, 2022*; 10:30 a.m., ESPN2		vs. No. 22 Tennessee; Battle 4 Atlantis Semifinals	L 66–73 ^{OT}	4–2	21 – Ellis	6 – Peterson	5 – Peterson	Imperial Arena (432); Nassau, BAH
November 25, 2022*; 10:00 a.m., ESPN2		vs. Wisconsin; Battle 4 Atlantis 3rd Place Game	L 59–64	4–3	17 – Peterson	10 – Peterson	5 – Johnson	Imperial Arena (510); Nassau, BAH
November 30, 2022; 7:00 p.m., P12N		at California	W 66–51	5–3 (1–0)	17 – Dixon-Waters	7 – Tied	5 – Peterson	Haas Pavilion (3,648); Berkeley, CA
December 4, 2022; 4:00 p.m., P12N		Oregon State	W 63–62	6–3 (2–0)	17 – Morgan	6 – Peterson	6 – Peterson	Galen Center (3,273); Los Angeles, CA
December 7, 2022*; 8:00 p.m., P12N		Cal State Fullerton	W 64–50	7–3	15 – White	8 – Peterson	5 – Tied	Galen Center (1,531); Los Angeles, CA
December 14, 2022*; 8:00 p.m., P12N		Long Beach State	W 88–78	8–3	20 – Tied	10 – Peterson	7 – Peterson	Galen Center (1,835); Los Angeles, CA
December 18, 2022*; 2:30 p.m., ESPN		No. 19 Auburn	W 74–71	9–3	28 – Ellis	5 – Johnson	4 – Tied	Galen Center (4,517); Los Angeles, CA
December 21, 2022*; 8:00 p.m., P12N		vs. Colorado State; Jerry Colangelo Classic	W 73–64	10–3	19 – Ellis	10 – Tied	4 – Peterson	Footprint Center (2,870); Phoenix, AZ
December 30, 2022; 7:00 p.m., ESPN2		at Washington	W 80–67	11–3 (3–0)	27 – Ellis	8 – Tied	5 – Johnson	Alaska Airlines Arena (7,690); Seattle, WA
January 1, 2023; 12:00 p.m., P12N		at Washington State	L 71–81	11–4 (3–1)	16 – Peterson	8 – Peterson	3 – Johnson	Beasley Coliseum (2,650); Pullman, WA
January 5, 2023; 6:30 p.m., ESPN		at No. 10 UCLA; Rivalry	L 58–60	11–5 (3–2)	16 – Dixon-Waters	5 – Tied	3 – Peterson	Pauley Pavilion (13,659); Los Angeles, CA
January 12, 2023; 6:00 p.m., P12N		Colorado	W 68–61	12–5 (4–2)	15 – Peterson	7 – Johnson	6 – Ellis	Galen Center (3,178); Los Angeles, CA
January 14, 2023; 7:30 p.m., P12N		Utah	W 71–56	13–5 (5–2)	17 – Ellis	10 – Morgan	4 – Dixon-Waters	Galen Center (4,671); Los Angeles, CA
January 19, 2023; 6:00 p.m., P12N		at No. 11 Arizona	L 66–81	13–6 (5–3)	15 – Peterson	6 – Tied	2 – Tied	McKale Center (14,688); Tucson, AZ
January 21, 2023; 7:00 p.m., ESPNU		at Arizona State	W 77–69	14–6 (6–3)	18 – Ellis	8 – Peterson	4 – Tied	Desert Financial Arena (10,505); Tempe, AZ
January 26, 2023; 6:00 p.m., ESPN2		No. 8 UCLA; Rivalry	W 77–64	15–6 (7–3)	31 – Ellis	5 – Johnson	6 – Ellis	Galen Center (9,605); Los Angeles, CA
February 2, 2023; 8:00 p.m., FS1		Washington State	W 80–70	16–6 (8–3)	23 – Ellis	6 – Tied	4 – Tied	Galen Center (3,751); Los Angeles, CA
February 4, 2023; 6:30 p.m., FS1		Washington	W 80–74	17–6 (9–3)	22 – White	10 – Peterson	8 – Peterson	Galen Center (5,706); Los Angeles, CA
February 9, 2023; 8:00 p.m., ESPN2		at Oregon	L 60–78	17–7 (9–4)	19 – Ellis	6 – Tied	4 – Ellis	Matthew Knight Arena (7,005); Eugene, OR
February 11, 2023; 3:00 p.m., P12N		at Oregon State	L 58–61	17–8 (9–5)	19 – Iwuchukwu	8 – Tied	3 – White	Gill Coliseum (3,796); Corvallis, OR
February 16, 2023; 8:00 p.m., FS1		California	W 97–60	18–8 (10–5)	30 – Peterson	7 – Peterson	6 – Peterson	Galen Center (3,698); Los Angeles, CA
February 18, 2023; 7:00 p.m., ESPNU		Stanford	W 85–75	19–8 (11–5)	33 – Ellis	7 – Tied	7 – Ellis	Galen Center (5,374); Los Angeles, CA
February 23, 2023; 6:00 p.m., ESPN2		at Colorado	W 84–65	20–8 (12–5)	21 – Ellis	7 – Johnson	6 – Peterson	CU Events Center (6,638); Boulder, CO
February 25, 2023; 5:00 p.m., ESPNU		at Utah	W 62–49	21–8 (13–5)	16 – Ellis	7 – Peterson	8 – Peterson	Jon M. Huntsman Center (10,134); Salt Lake City, UT
March 2, 2023; 8:00 p.m., ESPN		No. 8 Arizona	L 81–87	21–9 (13–6)	35 – Ellis	11 – Morgan	6 – Johnson	Galen Center (7,043); Los Angeles, CA
March 4, 2023; 8:00 p.m., FS1		Arizona State	W 68–65	22–9 (14–6)	28 – Ellis	7 – Tied	3 – Tied	Galen Center (8,671); Los Angeles, CA
Pac-12 tournament
March 9, 2023; 8:30 p.m., ESPN	(3)	vs. (6) Arizona State; Quarterfinals	L 72–77	22–10	16 – Tied	10 – Morgan	4 – Ellis	T-Mobile Arena (11,226); Paradise, NV
NCAA Tournament
March 17, 2023*; 9:15 am, CBS	(10 E)	vs. (7 E) Michigan State; First Round	L 62–72	22–11	14 – Morgan	9 – Johnson	5 – Ellis	Nationwide Arena; Columbus, OH
*Non-conference game. ^{#}Rankings from AP Poll. (#) Tournament seedings in parentheses. E=East. All times are in Pacific Time.

== Game summaries ==
This section will be filled in as the season progresses.

=== Florida Gulf Coast ===
P12N

November 7th
6:30 PM PST

Recap

Florida Gulf Coast Eagles 74, USC Trojans 61
Scoring by half: 29-30, 45-31
Pts: Chase Johnston - 20; Rebs: Zach Anderson - 10; Asts: Caleb Catto, Isaiah Thompson - 3	Pts: Boogie Ellis - 19; Rebs: Drew Peterson, Joshua Morgan - 9 Asts: Drew Peterson - 6

Galen Center, Los Angeles, California
Attendance: 2,355
Referees: Tommy Nunez, Scott Brown, Kurt Walker

=== Alabama State ===
P12N

November 10th
8:00 PM PST

Recap

Alabama State Hornets 58, USC Trojans 96
Scoring by half: 23-48, 35-48
Pts: Duane Posey - 12; Rebs: Christian McCray - 6 Asts: Alex Anderson - 5	Pts: Drew Peterson - 21; Rebs: Tre White - 12; Asts: Kobe Johnson - 6

Galen Center, Los Angeles, California
Attendance: 2,076
Referees: Glen Mayberry, Crystal Hogan, Verne Harris

== Statistics ==
Updated through November 30th, 2022

Record	USC	OPP
Scoring	572	527
Points Per Game	71.5	65.9
Field goals - Made-Att	206-452	184-499
3-point field goals - Made-Att	47-144	58-185
Free throws - Made-Att	113-160	101-144
Rebounds	308	297
Assists	110	101
Turnovers	119	93
Steals	49	58
Blocked Shots	52	24

=== Team Highs ===
Updated through November 30th, 2022

Team Game Highs
Stat	High	Opponent	Date
Points	96	Alabama State Hornets	November 10, 2022
Field goals made	36	Alabama State Hornets	November 10, 2022
Field Goal Attempts	65	Alabama State Hornets	November 10, 2022
3 Points Made	11	Alabama State Hornets; Wisconsin Badgers	November 10, 2022; November 25, 2022
3 Points Attempted	23	Alabama State Hornets; Wisconsin Badgers	November 10, 2022; November 25, 2022
Free throws Made	24	Mount St. Mary's Mountaineers	November 18, 2022
Free Throw Attempts	32	Mount St. Mary's Mountaineers	November 7, 2022
Rebounds	44	Alabama State Hornets	November 10, 2022
Assists	22	Alabama State Hornets	November 10, 2022
Steals	11	Alabama State Hornets	November 7, 2022
Blocked Shots	9	Alabama State Hornets	November 7, 2022
Turnovers	20	Tennessee Volunteers	November 24, 2022
Fouls	23	Tennessee Volunteers	November 24, 2022

=== Individual Highs ===
Updated through November 30th, 2022

Individual Game Highs
Stat	High	Opponent	Date
Points	27 - Boogie Ellis	BYU Cougars	November 23, 2022
Field goals made	7 - Boogie Ellis	Alabama State Hornets; BYU Cougars; Tennessee Volunteers	November 10, 2022; November 23, 2022; November 24, 2022
Field Goal Attempts	16 - Boogie Ellis	Wisconsin Badgers	November 25, 2022
3 Points Made	5 - Drew Peterson	Wisconsin Badgers	November 25, 2022
3 Points Attempted	8 - Boogie Ellis	Mount St. Mary's Mountaineers; Wisconsin Badgers	November 18, 2022; November 25, 2022
Free throws Made	13 - Boogie Ellis	BYU Cougars	November 23, 2022
Free Throw Attempts	17 - Boogie Ellis	BYU Cougars	November 23, 2022
Rebounds	12 - Tre White and Joshua Morgan	Alabama State Hornets; Mount St. Mary's Mountaineers	November 10, 2022; November 18, 2022
Assists	12 - Drew Peterson	Mount St. Mary's Mountaineers	November 18, 2022
Steals	7 - Boogie Ellis	Alabama State Hornets	November 10, 2022
Blocked Shots	7 - Joshua Morgan	Florida Gulf Coast Eagles; California Golden Bears	November 7, 2022; November 30, 2022
Turnovers	7 - Drew Peterson	Tennessee Volunteers	November 24, 2022
Fouls	5 - Joshua Morgan and Kobe Johnson	Florida Gulf Coast Eagles; BYU Cougars	November 7, 2022; November 23, 2022

== Rankings ==
Ranking movements Legend: RV = Received votes
	Week																			
Poll	Pre	1	2	3	4	5	6	7	8	9	10	11	12	13	14	15	16	17	18	Final
AP	RV																			Not released
Coaches	RV	^																		

*AP does not release post-NCAA Tournament rankings.
^Coaches did not release a Week 1 poll.
