= 2022–23 Oregon Ducks men's basketball team =

American college basketball season

2022–23 Oregon Ducks men's basketball

NIT, Quarterfinals
- Conference: Pac-12 Conference
- Record: 21–15 (12–8 Pac-12)
- Head coach: Dana Altman (13th season)
- Assistant coaches: Chuck Martin; Kevin McKenna; Mike Mennenga
- Home arena: Matthew Knight Arena

2022–23 Pac-12 Conference men's basketball standings
| | Conf. | | | | Overall |
| Team | W | | L | PCT | W | | L | PCT |
|---|---|---|---|---|---|---|---|---|
| No. 7 UCLA | 18 | – | 2 | .900 | 31 | – | 6 | .838 |
| No. 8 Arizona† | 14 | – | 6 | .700 | 28 | – | 7 | .800 |
| USC | 14 | – | 6 | .700 | 22 | – | 11 | .667 |
| Oregon | 12 | – | 8 | .600 | 21 | – | 15 | .583 |
| Arizona State | 11 | – | 9 | .550 | 23 | – | 13 | .639 |
| Washington State | 11 | – | 9 | .550 | 17 | – | 17 | .500 |
| Utah | 10 | – | 10 | .500 | 17 | – | 15 | .531 |
| Washington | 8 | – | 12 | .400 | 16 | – | 16 | .500 |
| Colorado | 8 | – | 12 | .400 | 18 | – | 17 | .514 |
| Stanford | 7 | – | 13 | .350 | 14 | – | 19 | .424 |
| Oregon State | 5 | – | 15 | .250 | 11 | – | 21 | .344 |
| California | 2 | – | 18 | .100 | 3 | – | 29 | .094 |
† Conference tournament winner Rankings from AP poll

The 2022–23 Oregon Ducks men's basketball team represented the University of Oregon during the 2022–23 NCAA Division I men's basketball season. The Ducks, led by 13th-year head coach Dana Altman, played their home games at Matthew Knight Arena as members of the Pac–12 Conference. They finished the season 18–13, 12–8 in Pac-12 play to finish in fourth place. As the No. 4 seed in the Pac-12 tournament, they defeated Washington State in the quarterfinals before losing to UCLA in the semifinal round. They received an invitation to the National Invitation Tournament, where they defeated UC Irvine in the first round and UCF in the second round, before losing to Wisconsin in the quarterfinals.

== Previous season ==
The Ducks finished the season 20–15, 11–9 in Pac-12 play to finish in a tie for 5th place for the regular season. They defeated Oregon State in the first round of the Pac-12 tournament before losing to Colorado in the quarterfinals. They did not receive an invitation to the NCAA tournament, but did receive a bid to the NIT tournament as 4 seed in the Texas A&M. They defeated Utah State 83–72 in their first round matchup, and were defeated in the second round by Texas A&M 60–75.

== Off-season ==
=== Departures ===
Oregon departures
| Name | Number | Pos. | Height | Weight | Year | Hometown | Reason for departure |
|---|---|---|---|---|---|---|---|
| De'Vion Harmon | 5 | G | 6'2" | 198 | Senior | Dallas, TX | Transferred to Texas Tech |
| Isaac Johnson | 33 | C | 7'0" | 225 | Sophomore | American Fork, UT | Transferred to Utah State |
| Franck Kepnang | 22 | C | 6'11" | 250 | Junior | Yaoundé, Cameroon | Transferred to Washington |
| Eric Williams Jr. | 50 | G | 6'7" | 195 | Grad senior | Port Huron, MI | Transferred to San Diego |
| Jacob Young | 42 | G | 6'3" | 190 | RS senior | Houston, TX | Graduated |

=== Incoming transfers ===
Oregon incoming transfers
| Name | Number | Pos. | Height | Weight | Year | Hometown | Previous school |
|---|---|---|---|---|---|---|---|
| Tyrone Williams | 2 | G | 6'5" | 200 | Junior | Philadelphia, PA | Transferred from Grayson CC |
| Keeshawn Barthelemy | 3 | G | 6'2" | 170 | RS junior | Montreal, QC | Transferred from Colorado |
| Brennan Rigsby | 4 | G | 6'3" | 180 | Sophomore | De Beque, CO | Transferred from NW Florida State |
| Jermaine Couisnard | 5 | G | 6'4" | 210 | RS senior | East Chicago, IN | Transferred from South Carolina |

=== 2022 recruiting class ===
College recruiting
| Name | Hometown | School | Height | Weight | Commit date |
|---|---|---|---|---|---|
| Kel'el Ware #3 C | North Little Rock, AR | North Little Rock High School | 7 ft 0 in (2.13 m) | 210 lb (95 kg) | Sep 11, 2021 |
| Kel'el Ware #3 C | Recruit ratings: Scout: Rivals: 247Sports: ESPN: (93) | | | | |
Overall recruit ranking: Rivals: 41 247Sports: 48
Note: In many cases, Scout, Rivals, 247Sports, On3, and ESPN may conflict in their listings of height and weight.; In these cases, the average was taken. ESPN grades are on a 100-point scale.; Sources:

=== 2023 recruiting class ===
College recruiting (2023)
| Name | Hometown | School | Height | Weight | Commit date |
|---|---|---|---|---|---|
| Jackson Shelstad; PG | West Linn, OR | West Linn High School | 6 ft 0 in (1.83 m) | 170 lb (77 kg) | Nov 14, 2021 |
| Jackson Shelstad; PG | Recruit ratings: Rivals: 247Sports: ESPN: (87) | | | | |
| Kwame Evans Jr. PF | Baltimore, MD | Montverde Academy | 6 ft 9 in (2.06 m) | 200 lb (91 kg) | Aug 2, 2022 |
| Kwame Evans Jr. PF | Recruit ratings: Rivals: 247Sports: ESPN: (91) | | | | |
| Mookie Cook; SF | Portland, OR | Compass Prep | 6 ft 7 in (2.01 m) | 200 lb (91 kg) | Aug 12, 2022 |
| Mookie Cook; SF | Recruit ratings: Rivals: 247Sports: ESPN: (89) | | | | |
Overall recruit ranking: Rivals: 7 247Sports: 8
Note: In many cases, Scout, Rivals, 247Sports, On3, and ESPN may conflict in their listings of height and weight.; In these cases, the average was taken. ESPN grades are on a 100-point scale.; Sources:

== Roster ==
2022–23 Oregon Ducks men's basketball team
Players
Coaches

| Pos. | # | Name | Height | Weight | Year | Previous school | Hometown |
|---|---|---|---|---|---|---|---|
| G | 0 | Will Richardson | 6 ft 5 in (1.96 m) | 180 lb (82 kg) | Sr | Oak Hill Academy | Hinesville, Georgia |
| C | 1 | N'Faly Dante | 6 ft 11 in (2.11 m) | 230 lb (104 kg) | Sr | Sunrise Christian Academy | Bamako, Mali |
| G | 2 | Tyrone Williams | 6 ft 5 in (1.96 m) | 200 lb (91 kg) | Jr | Grayson College | Philadelphia, Pennsylvania |
| G | 3 | Keeshawn Barthelemy | 6 ft 2 in (1.88 m) | 170 lb (77 kg) | RS Jr | Colorado | Montreal, Quebec |
| G | 4 | Brennan Rigsby | 6 ft 3 in (1.91 m) | 180 lb (82 kg) | So | NW Florida State | De Beque, Colorado |
| G | 5 | Jermaine Couisnard | 6 ft 4 in (1.93 m) | 210 lb (95 kg) | RS Sr | South Carolina | East Chicago, Indiana |
| C | 10 | Kel'el Ware | 7 ft 0 in (2.13 m) | 210 lb (95 kg) | Fr | North Little Rock HS | North Little Rock, Arkansas |
| G | 11 | Rivaldo Soares | 6 ft 6 in (1.98 m) | 205 lb (93 kg) | Sr | South Plains College | Boston, Massachusetts |
| F | 12 | James Cooper (W) | 6 ft 7 in (2.01 m) | 210 lb (95 kg) | So | Mauldin HS | Mauldin, South Carolina |
| F | 13 | Quincy Guerrier | 6 ft 8 in (2.03 m) | 220 lb (100 kg) | Sr | Syracuse | Montreal, Quebec |
| F | 14 | Ethan Butler | 6 ft 6 in (1.98 m) | 205 lb (93 kg) | RS Fr | Southwest Academy | Toronto, Ontario |
| F | 15 | Lök Wur | 6 ft 9 in (2.06 m) | 205 lb (93 kg) | RS Jr | Papillion-La Vista South HS | Omaha, Nebraska |
| G | 23 | Gabe Reichle (W) | 6 ft 2 in (1.88 m) | 185 lb (84 kg) | Jr | Wilsonville HS | Wilsonville, Oregon |
| G | 24 | Brady Parris (W) | 6 ft 1 in (1.85 m) | 185 lb (84 kg) | RS Sr | Mullen HS | Lakewood, Colorado |
| C | 32 | Nathan Bittle | 7 ft 0 in (2.13 m) | 215 lb (98 kg) | So | Prolific Prep | Central Point, Oregon |

Head coach

- Dana Altman (Eastern New Mexico)

Assistant coach(es)

- Chuck Martin (Monmouth)
- Kevin McKenna (Creighton)
- Mike Mennenga (Morehead State)

Legend

- (C) Team captain
- (S) Suspended
- (I) Ineligible
- (W) Walk-on
- Injured
- Current redshirt

Roster

== Schedule and results ==
| Date time, TV | Rank^{#} | Opponent^{#} | Result | Record | High points | High rebounds | High assists | Site (attendance) city, state |
Regular season
| November 7, 2022*; 7:00 p.m., P12N | No. 21 | Florida A&M; Pac-12/SWAC Legacy Series | W 80–45 | 1–0 | 16 – Dante | 10 – Dante | 4 – Richardson | Matthew Knight Arena (5,897); Eugene, OR |
| November 11, 2022*; 8:00 p.m., P12N | No. 21 | UC Irvine | L 56–69 | 1–1 | 20 – Dante | 9 – Dante | 4 – Richardson | Matthew Knight Arena (6,454); Eugene, OR |
| November 15, 2022*; 6:00 p.m., P12N | | Montana State | W 81–51 | 2–1 | 16 – Ware | 7 – Tied | 6 – Richardson | Matthew Knight Arena (5,347); Eugene, OR |
| November 20, 2022*; 6:30 p.m., ESPN | | No. 3 Houston | L 56–66 | 2–2 | 16 – Dante | 11 – Dante | 4 – Dante | Matthew Knight Arena (7,002); Eugene, OR |
| November 24, 2022*; 5:00 p.m., ESPN2 | | vs. No. 20 UConn; Phil Knight Invitational quarterfinals | L 59–83 | 2–3 | 18 – Ware | 9 – Ware | 3 – Dante | Moda Center (5,598); Portland, OR |
| November 25, 2022*; 9:00 p.m., ESPN2 | | vs. No. 12 Michigan State; Phil Knight Invitational consolation round | L 70–74 | 2–4 | 28 – Richardson | 9 – Ware | 8 – Richardson | Veterans Memorial Coliseum (3,603); Portland, OR |
| November 27, 2022*; 12:00 p.m., ESPN2 | | vs. Villanova; Phil Knight Invitational 7th-place game | W 74–67 | 3–4 | 21 – Guerrier | 8 – Tied | 8 – Richardson | Chiles Center; Portland, OR |
| December 1, 2022; 7:30 p.m., P12N | | Washington State | W 74–60 | 4–4 (1–0) | 22 – Dante | 7 – Dante | 8 – Richardson | Matthew Knight Arena (5,379); Eugene, OR |
| December 4, 2022; 2:00 p.m., ESPN | | at No. 21 UCLA | L 56–65 | 4–5 (1–1) | 15 – Guerrier | 5 – Wur | 5 – Richardson | Pauley Pavilion (8,093); Los Angeles, CA |
| December 10, 2022*; 4:00 p.m., P12N | | Nevada | W 78–65 | 5–5 | 26 – Guerrier | 10 – Richardson | 11 – Richardson | Matthew Knight Arena (5,416); Eugene, OR |
| December 14, 2022*; 6:00 p.m., P12N | | UC Riverside | W 71–65 | 6–5 | 19 – Rigsby | 10 – Guerrier | 5 – Richardson | Matthew Knight Arena (4,738); Eugene, OR |
| December 17, 2022*; 5:00 p.m., P12N | | Portland | W 78–56 | 7–5 | 16 – Soares | 6 – Tied | 12 – Richardson | Matthew Knight Arena (5,074); Eugene, OR |
| December 20, 2022*; 7:30 p.m., P12N | | Utah Valley | L 72–77 | 7–6 | 26 – Richardson | 14 – Dante | 4 – Richardson | Matthew Knight Arena (5,064); Eugene, OR |
| December 31, 2022; 5:00 p.m., P12N | | Oregon State; Rivalry | W 77–68 | 8–6 (2–1) | 22 – Richardson | 8 – Dante | 3 – Tied | Matthew Knight Arena (7,001); Eugene, OR |
| January 5, 2023; 6:00 p.m., ESPN2 | | at Colorado | L 41–68 | 8–7 (2–2) | 10 – Guerrier | 5 – Dante | 1 – Tied | CU Events Center (6,325); Boulder, CO |
| January 7, 2023; 4:00 p.m., P12N | | at Utah | W 70–60 | 9–7 (3–2) | 17 – Dante | 12 – Dante | 4 – Couisnard | Jon M. Huntsman Center (8,235); Salt Lake City, UT |
| January 12, 2023; 6:00 p.m., FS1 | | Arizona State | L 73–90 | 9–8 (3–3) | 16 – Richardson | 8 – Dante | 3 – Tied | Matthew Knight Arena (5,955); Eugene, OR |
| January 14, 2023; 3:00 p.m., ESPN | | No. 9 Arizona | W 87–68 | 10–8 (4–3) | 27 – Couisnard | 10 – Dante | 5 – Richardson | Matthew Knight Arena (7,970); Eugene, OR |
| January 18, 2023; 7:00 p.m., P12N | | at California | W 87–58 | 11–8 (5–3) | 13 – Soares | 7 – Dante | 10 – Richardson | Haas Pavilion (2,341); Berkeley, CA |
| January 21, 2023; 8:00 p.m., FS1 | | at Stanford | L 64–71 | 11–9 (5–4) | 18 – Couisnard | 15 – Dante | 4 – Couisnard | Maples Pavilion (3,542); Stanford, CA |
| January 26, 2023; 6:00 p.m., P12N | | Colorado | W 75–69 | 12–9 (6–4) | 16 – Guerrier | 13 – Bittle | 6 – Richardson | Matthew Knight Arena (5,680); Eugene, OR |
| January 28, 2023; 5:00 p.m., P12N | | Utah | W 68–56 | 13–9 (7–4) | 18 – Couisnard | 10 – Dante | 7 – Richardson | Matthew Knight Arena (8,228); Eugene, OR |
| February 2, 2023; 7:30 p.m., ESPN | | at No. 5 Arizona | L 76–91 | 13–10 (7–5) | 22 – Richardson | 6 – Guerrier | 5 – Richardson | McKale Center (14,688); Tucson, AZ |
| February 4, 2023; 7:00 p.m., ESPN2 | | at Arizona State | W 75–70 | 14–10 (8–5) | 18 – Dante | 6 – Bittle | 5 – Barthelemy | Desert Financial Arena (9,815); Tempe, AZ |
| February 9, 2023; 8:00 p.m., ESPN2 | | USC | W 78–60 | 15–10 (9–5) | 17 – Dante | 6 – Tied | 9 – Richardson | Matthew Knight Arena (7,005); Eugene, OR |
| February 11, 2023; 7:00 p.m., ESPN | | No. 7 UCLA | L 63–70 | 15–11 (9–6) | 19 – Couisnard | 9 – Dante | 3 – Tied | Matthew Knight Arena (10,272); Eugene, OR |
| February 15, 2023; 8:00 p.m., ESPNU | | at Washington | L 71–72 ^{OT} | 15–12 (9–7) | 19 – Dante | 13 – Dante | 5 – Richardson | Alaska Airlines Arena (7,079); Seattle, WA |
| February 19, 2023; 4:00 p.m., FS1 | | at Washington State | L 65–68 | 15–13 (9–8) | 17 – Barthelemy | 11 – Dante | 2 – 3 tied | Beasley Coliseum (4,467); Pullman, WA |
| February 25, 2023; 7:00 p.m., P12N | | at Oregon State; Rivalry | W 69–67 | 16–13 (10–8) | 16 – Dante | 18 – Dante | 7 – Richardson | Gill Coliseum (7,270); Corvallis, OR |
| March 2, 2023; 8:00 p.m., FS1 | | California | W 84–51 | 17–13 (11–8) | 17 – Couisnard | 8 – Dante | 5 – Barthelemy | Matthew Knight Arena (5,908); Eugene, OR |
| March 4, 2023; 1:00 p.m., CBS | | Stanford | W 73–68 | 18–13 (12–8) | 15 – Dante | 12 – Dante | 6 – Richardson | Matthew Knight Arena (7,458); Eugene, OR |
Pac-12 tournament
| March 9, 2023; 2:30 p.m., P12N | (4) | vs. (5) Washington State; Quarterfinals | W 75–70 | 19–13 | 17 – Tied | 11 – Dante | 4 – Richardson | T-Mobile Arena (10,406); Paradise, NV |
| March 10, 2023; 6:00 p.m., P12N | (4) | vs. (1) No. 2 UCLA; Semifinals | L 56–75 | 19–14 | 10 – Tied | 10 – Dante | 3 – Tied | T-Mobile Arena (13,788); Paradise, NV |
NIT
| March 15, 2023; 8:00 p.m., ESPN2 | (1) | UC Irvine; First Round – Oregon Bracket | W 84–58 | 20–14 | 21 – Soares | 10 – Soares | 5 – Barthelemy | Matthew Knight Arena (2,431); Eugene, OR |
| March 19, 2023; 4:30 p.m., ESPNU | (1) | UCF; Second Round – Oregon Bracket | W 68–54 | 21–14 | 21 – Bittle | 13 – Bittle | 8 – Barthelemy | Matthew Knight Arena (3,019); Eugene, OR |
| March 21, 2023; 6:00 p.m., ESPN | (1) | (2) Wisconsin; Quarterfinals – Oregon Bracket | L 58–61 | 21–15 | 15 – Barthelemy | 8 – Guerrier | 5 – Soares | Matthew Knight Arena (3,384); Eugene, OR |
*Non-conference game. ^{#}Rankings from AP Poll. (#) Tournament seedings in parentheses. All times are in Pacific Time.

== Ranking movement ==
Ranking movements Legend: ██ Increase in ranking ██ Decrease in ranking RV = Received votes
| | Week | | | | | | | | | | | | | | | | | | | |
| Poll | Pre | 1 | 2 | 3 | 4 | 5 | 6 | 7 | 8 | 9 | 10 | 11 | 12 | 13 | 14 | 15 | 16 | 17 | 18 | Final |
|---|---|---|---|---|---|---|---|---|---|---|---|---|---|---|---|---|---|---|---|---|
| AP | 21 | RV | | | | | | | | | | | | | | | | | | Not released |
| Coaches | 21 | RV | | | | | | | | | | | | | | | | | | |

*AP does not release post-NCAA Tournament rankings.
