= 2022–23 Stanford Cardinal men's basketball team =

College basketball team season

2022–23 Stanford Cardinal men's basketball
- Conference: Pac-12 Conference
- Record: 14–19 (7–13 Pac-12)
- Head coach: Jerod Haase (7th season)
- Assistant coaches: Jesse Pruitt; Robert Ehsan; Brandon Dunson
- Home arena: Maples Pavilion

2022–23 Pac-12 Conference men's basketball standings
	Conf.				Overall
Team	W		L	PCT	W		L	PCT
No. 7 UCLA	18	–	2	.900	31	–	6	.838
No. 8 Arizona†	14	–	6	.700	28	–	7	.800
USC	14	–	6	.700	22	–	11	.667
Oregon	12	–	8	.600	21	–	15	.583
Arizona State	11	–	9	.550	23	–	13	.639
Washington State	11	–	9	.550	17	–	17	.500
Utah	10	–	10	.500	17	–	15	.531
Washington	8	–	12	.400	16	–	16	.500
Colorado	8	–	12	.400	18	–	17	.514
Stanford	7	–	13	.350	14	–	19	.424
Oregon State	5	–	15	.250	11	–	21	.344
California	2	–	18	.100	3	–	29	.094
† Conference tournament winner Rankings from AP poll

The 2022–23 Stanford Cardinal men's basketball team represented Stanford University during the 2022–23 NCAA Division I men's basketball season. The Cardinal, led by seventh-year head coach Jerod Haase, competed as a member of the Pac-12 Conference. They played home games at Maples Pavilion.

== Previous season ==
The Cardinal started the 2021-22 campaign off on the right foot winning 12 of their first 18 games with an upset win over, at the time, #15 ranked USC Trojans. They would only win three of the final 12 conference games, finishing off the regular season at 15–15 with an 8–12 conference record finishing 9th in the Pac-12.

In the Pac-12 tournament, the Cardinal would face the Sun Devils in the 8/9 match-up. They would go on to beat the Sun Devils 71–70 on a James Keefe jumper in the paint as time expired. In the Quarterfinal round, the Cardinal would go on to face the number one seed Arizona, growing and holding a four-point lead into the late second half, until Arizona pulled ahead with a little over three minutes left in the game and would never look back.

The Cardinal finished the 2021–22 season with an even 16–16 record.

== Offseason ==
=== Departures ===
Stanford Departures
Name	Number	Pos.	Height	Weight	Year	Hometown	Reason for Departure
Daniel Begovich	21	G	6'5"	215	Graduate Student	San Francisco, CA	Walk-on; Graduated
Lukas Kisunas	32	F	6'10"	265	Senior	Vilnius, Lithuania	Grad transfer to Denver
Sam Beskind	24	G	6'4"	190	RS-Junior	Tucson, AZ	Walk-on; Grad transfer to Colorado Mines
Jaiden Delaire	11	F	6'9"	215	Senior	North Granby, CT	Grad transfer to San Diego
Keenan Fitzmorris	12	C	7'0"	235	RS-Junior	Overland Park, KS	Grad transfer to Stony Brook
Noah Taitz	20	G	6'3"	185	Sophomore	Las Vegas, NV	Transfer to Loyola Marymount

=== 2022 recruiting class ===
College recruiting information
Name	Hometown	School	Height	Weight	Commit date
Ryan Agarwal #30 SF	Coppell, TX	Coppell High School	6 ft 6 in (1.98 m)	175 lb (79 kg)	Mar 16, 2021
Ryan Agarwal #30 SF	Recruit ratings: Rivals: 247Sports: ESPN: (82)				
Jaylen Thompson #27 SF	Castaic, CA	Southern California Academy	6 ft 7 in (2.01 m)	180 lb (82 kg)	Sep 8, 2021
Jaylen Thompson #27 SF	Recruit ratings: Rivals: 247Sports: ESPN: (82)				
Benny Gealer; G (walk-on)	Palos Verdes Estates, CA	Rolling Hills Preparatory	6 ft 2 in (1.88 m)	185 lb (84 kg)	Oct 9, 2021
Benny Gealer; G (walk-on)	Recruit ratings: Rivals: 247Sports:				
Overall recruit ranking: Rivals: 43 247Sports: 55
Note: In many cases, Scout, Rivals, 247Sports, On3, and ESPN may conflict in their listings of height and weight.; In these cases, the average was taken. ESPN grades are on a 100-point scale.; Sources: "Stanford 2022 Basketball Commitments". Rivals.; "2022 Team Ranking". Rivals.

=== Incoming transfers ===
Stanford Additions
Name	Number	Pos.	Height	Weight	Year	Hometown	Notes
Michael Jones	13	G	6'5"	210	Graduate Student	Woodbury, MN	Transfer from Davidson. Jones will have two years of eligibility left.

In Stanford's season opener against Pacific, Jones became the first transfer to play for the Cardinal since the 2011–12 season.

=== 2023 recruiting class ===
College recruiting information (2023)
Name	Hometown	School	Height	Weight	Commit date
Kanaan Carlyle; G	Alpharetta, GA	Milton High School	6 ft 3 in (1.91 m)	185 lb (84 kg)	Jan 5, 2022
Kanaan Carlyle; G	Recruit ratings: Rivals: 247Sports: ESPN: (91)				
Andrej Stojaković; SF	Carmichael, CA	Jesuit High School	6 ft 7 in (2.01 m)	185 lb (84 kg)	Nov 7, 2022
Andrej Stojaković; SF	Recruit ratings: Rivals: 247Sports: ESPN: (89)				
Overall recruit ranking: Rivals: 7
Note: In many cases, Scout, Rivals, 247Sports, On3, and ESPN may conflict in their listings of height and weight.; In these cases, the average was taken. ESPN grades are on a 100-point scale.; Sources: "Stanford 2023 Basketball Commitments". Rivals.; "2023 Team Ranking". Rivals.

== Roster ==
2022–23 Stanford Cardinal men's basketball team
Players
Coaches

Pos.	#	Name	Height	Weight	Year	Previous school	Hometown
G	1	Isa Silva	6 ft 4 in (1.93 m)	190 lb (86 kg)	So	Jesuit	Sacramento, CA
G	2	Roy Yuan	6 ft 1 in (1.85 m)	170 lb (77 kg)	Sr	Saint Francis High School	San Jose, CA
G	3	Jarvis Moss	6 ft 4 in (1.93 m)	190 lb (86 kg)	So	Cannon School	Concord, NC
G	5	Michael O'Connell	6 ft 2 in (1.88 m)	190 lb (86 kg)	Jr	Blair Academy	Mineola, NY
F	10	Max Murrell	6 ft 9 in (2.06 m)	225 lb (102 kg)	Jr	Millard North	Omaha, NE
G	11	Ryan Agarwal	6 ft 6 in (1.98 m)	190 lb (86 kg)	Fr	Coppell	Coppell, TX
G	13	Michael Jones	6 ft 5 in (1.96 m)	210 lb (95 kg)	GS	Woodbury High School; Davidson	Woodbury, MN
F	14	Spencer Jones	6 ft 7 in (2.01 m)	225 lb (102 kg)	Sr	Bishop Miege	Roeland Park, KS
G	15	Benny Gealer (W)	6 ft 2 in (1.88 m)	185 lb (84 kg)	Fr	Rolling Hills Preparatory	Palos Verdes Estates, CA
F	21	Neal Begovich (W)	6 ft 9 in (2.06 m)	230 lb (104 kg)	RS Jr	St. Ignatius College Prep	San Francisco, CA
F	22	James Keefe	6 ft 9 in (2.06 m)	235 lb (107 kg)	Sr	Loyola	Los Angeles, CA
F	23	Brandon Angel	6 ft 8 in (2.03 m)	230 lb (104 kg)	Jr	Torrey Pines	San Diego, CA
F	24	Jaylen Thompson	6 ft 8 in (2.03 m)	180 lb (82 kg)	Fr	Southern California Academy	Alameda, CA
G	25	Josue Gil–Silva	6 ft 1 in (1.85 m)	185 lb (84 kg)	Sr	Alisal High School	Salinas, CA
F	42	Maxime Raynaud	7 ft 1 in (2.16 m)	240 lb (109 kg)	So	Lycée Henri-IV	Paris, France
F	55	Harrison Ingram	6 ft 7 in (2.01 m)	230 lb (104 kg)	So	St. Mark's	Dallas, TX

Head coach

- Jerod Haase (Kansas)

Assistant coach(es)

- Jesse Pruitt (UC Davis)
- Robert Ehsan (UC Davis)
- Brandon Dunson (Arizona State)

Legend

- (C) Team captain
- (S) Suspended
- (I) Ineligible
- (W) Walk-on
- Injured
- Current redshirt

Roster

== Schedule and results ==
Date time, TV	Rank^{#}	Opponent^{#}	Result	Record	High points	High rebounds	High assists	Site (attendance) city, state
Regular season
November 7, 2022*; 11:00 a.m., P12N		Pacific	W 88–78	1–0	31 – M. Jones	9 – M. Raynaud	6 – H. Ingram	Maples Pavilion (3,380); Stanford, CA
November 11, 2022*; 4:30 p.m., FS1		vs. Wisconsin; Brew City Battle	L 50–60	1–1	14 – B. Angel	8 – H. Ingram	2 – M. O'Connell	American Family Field (17,927); Milwaukee, WI
November 15, 2022*; 6:00 p.m., P12N		No. 17 San Diego State	L 62–74	1–2	15 – S. Jones	5 – S. Jones	3 – M. Jones	Maples Pavilion (3,945); Stanford, CA
November 18, 2022*; 8:00 p.m., P12N		Cal Poly	W 80–43	2–2	15 – Tied	7 – J. Keefe	8 – H. Ingram	Maples Pavilion (2,263); Stanford, CA
November 24, 2022*; 10:30 a.m., ESPNU		vs. Ole Miss; ESPN Events Invitational Quarterfinals	L 68–72	2–3	24 – H. Ingram	5 – Tied	4 – M. Jones	State Farm Field House (1,211); Bay Lake, FL
November 25, 2022*; 10:30 a.m., ESPNews		vs. Florida State; ESPN Events Invitational Consolation round	W 70–60	3–3	22 – B. Angel	8 – Tied	3 – M. O'Connell	State Farm Field House (1,108); Bay Lake, FL
November 27, 2022*; 8:00 a.m., ESPNU		vs. Memphis; ESPN Events Invitational 5th-place game	L 48–56	3–4	10 – Tied	9 – M. Raynaud	4 – H. Ingram	State Farm Field House; Bay Lake, FL
December 1, 2022; 7:30 p.m., ESPN2		No. 21 UCLA	L 66–80	3–5 (0–1)	18 – S. Jones	7 – Keefe	5 – M. Jones	Maples Pavilion (4,848); Stanford, CA
December 4, 2022; 4:00 p.m., ESPN2		at Arizona State	L 64–68	3–6 (0–2)	13 – S. Jones	6 – S. Jones	5 – Ingram	Desert Financial Arena (7,243); Tempe, AZ
December 16, 2022*; 5:00 p.m., P12N		Green Bay	W 85–40	4–6	11 – Agarwal	5 – Tied	4 – Silva	Maples Pavilion (2,583); Stanford, CA
December 18, 2022*; 10:00 a.m., ESPN		vs. No. 7 Texas; Pac-12 Coast-to-Coast Challenge	L 62–72	4–7	17 – M. Jones	7 – S. Jones	4 – Ingram	American Airlines Center (4,700); Dallas, TX
December 22, 2022*; 7:00 p.m., P12N		vs. Loyola–Chicago	W 75–62	5–7	15 – Ingram	8 – Keefe	3 – Ingram	Kaiser Permanente Arena (1,287); Santa Cruz, CA
December 29, 2022; 8:00 p.m., ESPNU		Colorado	L 70–73	5–8 (0–3)	25 – S. Jones	6 – Tied	4 – M. Jones	Maples Pavilion (2,640); Stanford, CA
December 31, 2022; 1:00 p.m., P12N		Utah	L 66–71	5–9 (0–4)	16 – S. Jones	7 – Ingram	5 – Ingram	Maples Pavilion (2,759); Stanford, CA
January 6, 2023; 6:00 p.m., ESPNU		at California	L 70–92	5–10 (0–5)	14 – M. Jones	5 – S. Jones	4 – O’Connell	Haas Pavilion (3,648); Berkeley, CA
January 12, 2023; 8:00 p.m., FS1		at Washington	L 69–86	5–11 (0–6)	12 – S. Jones	9 – Ingram	3 – Tied	Alaska Airlines Arena (5,692); Seattle, WA
January 14, 2023; 5:00 p.m., P12N		at Washington State	L 59–60	5–12 (0–7)	16 – Raynaud	9 – Ingram	6 – Ingram	Beasley Coliseum (3,590); Pullman, WA
January 19, 2023; 8:00 p.m., P12N		Oregon State	W 67–47	6–12 (1–7)	18 – S. Jones	8 – Ingram	6 – Ingram	Maples Pavilion (2,782); Stanford, CA
January 21, 2023; 8:00 p.m., FS1		Oregon	W 71–64	7–12 (2–7)	16 – S. Jones	8 – Tied	5 – Ingram	Maples Pavilion (3,542); Stanford, CA
January 25, 2023*; 7:00 p.m., P12N		Chicago State	W 72–65	8–12	21 – S. Jones	13 – Raynaud	5 – O’Connell	Maples Pavilion (2,406); Stanford, CA
January 28, 2023; 7:00 p.m., ESPNU		California	W 75–46	9–12 (3–7)	15 – Raynaud	15 – Raynaud	7 – O’Connell	Maples Pavilion (5,112); Stanford, CA
February 2, 2023; 5:00 p.m., P12N		at Utah	W 77–70	10–12 (4–7)	22 – S. Jones	7 – O’Connell	6 – Ingram	Jon M. Huntsman Center (7,318); Salt Lake City, UT
February 5, 2023; 4:00 p.m., FS1		at Colorado	L 62–84	10–13 (4–8)	14 – Angel	5 – Ingram	5 – O’Connell	CU Events Center (6,974); Boulder, CO
February 9, 2023; 7:00 p.m., FS1		Arizona State	L 65-69	10–14 (4–9)	17 – S. Jones	10 – Raynaud	2 – Tied	Maples Pavilion (3,923); Stanford, CA
February 11, 2023; 5:00 p.m., ESPN2		No. 4 Arizona	W 88–79	11–14 (5–9)	22 – O'Connell	9 – Ingram	7 – Ingram	Maples Pavilion (5,313); Stanford, CA
February 16, 2023; 8:00 p.m., ESPN2		at No. 4 UCLA	L 64–73	11–15 (5–10)	15 – M. Jones	10 – Raynaud	5 – Tied	Pauley Pavilion (10,241); Los Angeles, CA
February 18, 2023; 7:00 p.m., ESPNU		at USC	L 75–85	11–16 (5–11)	15 – Ingram	9 – Ingram	7 – O'Connell	Galen Center (5,374); Los Angeles, CA
February 23, 2023; 8:00 p.m., P12N		Washington State	L 63–67	11–17 (5–12)	15 – Ingram	8 – Raynaud	5 – Tied	Maples Pavilion (2,530); Stanford, CA
February 26, 2023; 3:00 p.m., FS1		Washington	W 81–69	12–17 (6–12)	21 – Jones	7 – Angel	12 – O'Connell	Maples Pavilion (4,738); Stanford, CA
March 2, 2023; 6:00 p.m., P12N		at Oregon State	W 83–60	13–17 (7–12)	25 – Jones	8 – Ingram	6 – O'Connell	Gill Coliseum (3,122); Corvallis, OR
March 4, 2023; 1:00 p.m., CBS		at Oregon	L 68–73	13–18 (7–13)	18 – Tied	8 – Ingram	8 – Ingram	Matthew Knight Arena (7,458); Eugene, OR
Pac-12 tournament
March 8, 2023; 6:00 p.m., P12N	(10)	vs. (7) Utah; First round	W 73–62	14–18	16 – Angel	12 – Angel	2 – Tied	T-Mobile Arena (8,810); Paradise, NV
March 9, 2023; 6:00 p.m., P12N	(10)	vs. (2) No. 8 Arizona; Quarterfinals	L 84–95	14–19	22 – S. Jones	7 – Angel	5 – Ingram	T-Mobile Arena (11,226); Paradise, NV
*Non-conference game. ^{#}Rankings from AP Poll. (#) Tournament seedings in parentheses. All times are in Pacific Time.
