= 2022–23 Colorado Buffaloes men's basketball team =

American college basketball season

2022–23 Colorado Buffaloes men's basketball

NIT, Second Round
- Conference: Pac-12 Conference
- Record: 18–17 (8–12 Pac-12)
- Head coach: Tad Boyle (13th season)
- Assistant coaches: Mike Rhon; Bill Grier; Rick Ray
- Home arena: CU Events Center

2022–23 Pac-12 Conference men's basketball standings
	Conf.				Overall
Team	W		L	PCT	W		L	PCT
No. 7 UCLA	18	–	2	.900	31	–	6	.838
No. 8 Arizona†	14	–	6	.700	28	–	7	.800
USC	14	–	6	.700	22	–	11	.667
Oregon	12	–	8	.600	21	–	15	.583
Arizona State	11	–	9	.550	23	–	13	.639
Washington State	11	–	9	.550	17	–	17	.500
Utah	10	–	10	.500	17	–	15	.531
Washington	8	–	12	.400	16	–	16	.500
Colorado	8	–	12	.400	18	–	17	.514
Stanford	7	–	13	.350	14	–	19	.424
Oregon State	5	–	15	.250	11	–	21	.344
California	2	–	18	.100	3	–	29	.094
† Conference tournament winner Rankings from AP poll

The 2022–23 Colorado Buffaloes men's basketball team represented the University of Colorado Boulder in the 2022–23 NCAA Division I men's basketball season. They were led by head coach Tad Boyle in his thirteenth season at Colorado. The Buffaloes played their home games at CU Events Center in Boulder, Colorado as members of the Pac-12 Conference.

== Previous season ==
The Buffaloes finished the season 21–12, 12–8 in Pac-12 Play to finish in 4th place. They defeated Oregon in the quarterfinals of the Pac-12 tournament before losing in the semifinals to Arizona. They received an at-large bid to the National Invitation Tournament, where they lost in the first round to St. Bonaventure.

== Off-season ==
=== Departures ===
Name	Pos.	Height	Weight	Year	Hometown	Reason for departure
Evan Battey	F	6'8"	259	RS senior	Los Angeles, California	Graduated
Benan Ersek	G	6'2"	185	Senior	Vienna, Austria	Walk-on; graduated
Elijah Parquet	G	6'4"	195	Senior	Beaumont, Texas	Transferred to UNLV
Keeshawn Barthelemy	G	6'2"	171	RS sophomore	Montreal, Quebec	Transferred to Oregon

=== Incoming transfers ===
Name	Num	Pos.	Height	Weight	Year	Hometown	Previous school
Jalen Gabbidon	3	G	6'5"	190	GS senior	Harrisburg, PA	Yale
J'Vonne Hadley	13	G	6'6"	215	Sophomore	St. Paul, MN	Indian Hills CC
Ethan Wright	14	G	6'4"	190	GS senior	Newton Centre, MN	Princeton

=== 2022 recruiting class ===
College recruiting
Name	Hometown	School	Height	Weight	Commit date
Joe Hurlburt #19 C	Enderlin, ND	Enderlin High School	6 ft 10 in (2.08 m)	220 lb (100 kg)	Mar 29, 2021
Joe Hurlburt #19 C	Recruit ratings: Rivals: 247Sports: ESPN:				
Overall recruit ranking:
Note: In many cases, Scout, Rivals, 247Sports, On3, and ESPN may conflict in their listings of height and weight.; In these cases, the average was taken. ESPN grades are on a 100-point scale.; Sources: "2022 Colorado Commits". Rivals.; "2022 Team Ranking". Rivals.

== Roster ==
2022–23 Colorado Buffaloes men's basketball team
Players
Coaches

Pos.	#	Name	Height	Weight	Year	Previous school	Hometown
G	0	Luke O'Brien	6 ft 8 in (2.03 m)	213 lb (97 kg)	Jr	Columbine HS	Littleton, CO
G	1	Julian Hammond III	6 ft 3 in (1.91 m)	181 lb (82 kg)	So	Cherry Creek HS	Denver, CO
G	2	KJ Simpson	6 ft 2 in (1.88 m)	177 lb (80 kg)	So	Chaminade College Prep	West Hills, CA
G	3	Jalen Gabbidon	6 ft 5 in (1.96 m)	195 lb (88 kg)	GS	Glenelg Country School; Yale	Harrisburg, PA
G/F	5	Quincy Allen	6 ft 8 in (2.03 m)	190 lb (86 kg)	So	Maret School	Silver Spring, MD
G	10	RJ Smith	6 ft 4 in (1.93 m)	175 lb (79 kg)	Fr	Damien HS	Chino, CA
G	11	Javon Ruffin	6 ft 5 in (1.96 m)	191 lb (87 kg)	So	PHH Prep	New Orleans, LA
G	13	J'Vonne Hadley	6 ft 6 in (1.98 m)	215 lb (98 kg)	Jr	Cretin-Derham Hall HS; Indian Hills CC	St. Paul, MN
G	14	Ethan Wright	6 ft 4 in (1.93 m)	190 lb (86 kg)	GS	Newton North HS; Princeton	Newton Centre, MA
G/F	15	Amondo Miller Jr. (W)	6 ft 6 in (1.98 m)	181 lb (82 kg)	RS Fr	Valor Christian HS	Littleton, CO
F	23	Tristan da Silva	6 ft 9 in (2.06 m)	217 lb (98 kg)	Jr	Ludwigsgymnasium Munich	Munich, Germany
F	24	Joe Hurlburt	6 ft 11 in (2.11 m)	230 lb (104 kg)	Fr	Enderlin HS	Enderlin, ND
F	30	Will Loughlin (W)	6 ft 9 in (2.06 m)	215 lb (98 kg)	Sr	Seattle Prep	Seattle, WA
G	32	Nique Clifford	6 ft 6 in (1.98 m)	191 lb (87 kg)	Jr	The Vanguard School	Colorado Springs, CO
C	34	Lawson Lovering	7 ft 1 in (2.16 m)	225 lb (102 kg)	So	Central HS	Cheyenne, WY
F	41	Cody Mains (W)	6 ft 8 in (2.03 m)	215 lb (98 kg)	So	W.T. Woodson HS	Fairfax, VA
G	44	Jack Pease (W)	5 ft 11 in (1.8 m)	165 lb (75 kg)	So	Highland Park HS	Dallas, TX

Head coach

- Tad Boyle (Kansas)

Assistant coach(es)

- Mike Rohn (McPherson)
- Bill Grier (Oregon)
- Rick Ray (Grand View College)

Legend

- (C) Team captain
- (S) Suspended
- (I) Ineligible
- (W) Walk-on
- Injured
- Current redshirt

Roster

== Schedule and results ==
Date time, TV	Rank^{#}	Opponent^{#}	Result	Record	High points	High rebounds	High assists	Site (attendance) city, state
Exhibition
October 30, 2022*; 4:00 p.m.		Nebraska; Charity Exhibition	W 72–61		17 – Simpson	8 – Tied	4 – Hammond III	CU Events Center (3,360); Boulder, CO
Regular season
November 7, 2022*; 6:30 p.m., P12N		UC Riverside	W 82–66	1–0	16 – Hadley	8 – Hadley	3 – Tied	CU Events Center (5,388); Boulder, CO
November 11, 2022*; 6:00 p.m., ESPN+/P12N		at Grambling State; Pac-12/SWAC Legacy Series	L 74–83	1–1	16 – Simpson	8 – Hadley	4 – Simpson	Fredrick C. Hobdy Assembly Center (837); Grambling, LA
November 13, 2022*; 12:00 p.m., ESPN		vs. No. 11 Tennessee	W 78–66	2–1	23 – Simpson	10 – Tied	3 – Tied	Bridgestone Arena (12,482); Nashville, TN
November 17, 2022*; 11:30 a.m., ESPNU		vs. UMass; Myrtle Beach Invitational quarterfinals	L 63–66	2–2	17 – da Silva	9 – Hadley	6 – Simpson	HTC Center (1,256); Conway, SC
November 18, 2022*; 10:00 a.m., ESPNU		vs. No. 24 Texas A&M; Myrtle Beach Invitational consolation round	W 103–75	3–2	30 – Simpson	7 – Simpson	4 – Tied	HTC Center (1,332); Conway, SC
November 20, 2022*; 5:00 p.m., ESPNews		vs. Boise State; Myrtle Beach Invitational 5th-place game	L 55–68	3–3	14 – Simpson	6 – Lovering	4 – Simpson	HTC Center (1,281); Conway, SC
November 27, 2022*; 1:00 p.m., P12N		Yale	W 65–62	4–3	20 – da Silva	6 – da Silva	3 – Simpson	CU Events Center (5,780); Boulder, CO
December 1, 2022; 6:30 p.m., FS1		Arizona State	L 59–60	4–4 (0–1)	13 – Simpson	8 – da Silva	3 – 2 tied	CU Events Center (6,917); Boulder, CO
December 4, 2022; 1:00 p.m., P12N		at Washington	L 63–73	4–5 (0–2)	15 – Hadley	5 – Clifford	4 – Hammond	Alaska Airlines Arena (7,261); Seattle, WA
December 8, 2022*; 7:00 p.m., ESPN2		Colorado State	W 93–65	5–5	27 – Simpson	9 – Hadley	3 – Tied	CU Events Center (10,033); Boulder, CO
December 15, 2022*; 6:30 p.m., P12N		North Alabama	W 84–60	6–5	25 – da Silva	9 – da Silva	6 – Simpson	CU Events Center (5,125); Boulder, CO
December 18, 2022*; 3:00 p.m., P12N		Northern Colorado	W 88–77	7–5	26 – da Silva	9 – Hadley	4 – Simpson	CU Events Center (6,015); Boulder, CO
December 21, 2022*; 5:00 p.m., P12N		Southern Utah	W 86–78	8–5	21 – Simpson	10 – da Silva	4 – Simpson	CU Events Center (5,108); Boulder, CO
December 29, 2022; 9:00 p.m., ESPNU		at Stanford	W 73–70	9–5 (1–2)	31 – Simpson	7 – Simpson	4 – Simpson	Maples Pavilion (2,640); Stanford, CA
December 31, 2022; 4:00 p.m., P12N		at California	L 76–80	9–6 (1–3)	25 – Simpson	4 – Tied	5 – Simpson	Haas Pavilion (1,253); Berkeley, CA
January 5, 2023; 7:00 p.m., ESPN2		Oregon	W 68–41	10–6 (2–3)	30 – da Silva	11 – O'Brien	3 – Hammond	CU Events Center (6,325); Boulder, CO
January 7, 2023; 7:30 p.m., P12N		Oregon State	W 62–42	11–6 (3–3)	17 – da Silva	9 – O’Brien	6 – Simpson	CU Events Center (6,203); Boulder, CO
January 12, 2023; 7:00 p.m., P12N		at USC	L 61–68	11–7 (3–4)	17 – Simpson	14 – Lovering	4 – Hadley	Galen Center (3,178); Los Angeles, CA
January 14, 2023; 6:00 p.m., FOX		at No. 7 UCLA	L 54–68	11–8 (3–5)	17 – Simpson	10 – Hadley	3 – Simpson	Pauley Pavilion (8,106); Los Angeles, CA
January 19, 2023; 7:00 p.m., ESPNU		Washington	L 72–75	11–9 (3–6)	18 – Hammond	7 – da Silva	3 – Hammond	CU Events Center (6,974); Boulder, CO
January 22, 2023; 4:00 p.m., ESPNU		Washington State	W 58–55	12–9 (4–6)	27 – da Silva	6 – O'Brien	3 – Simpson	CU Events Center (–); Boulder, CO
January 26, 2023; 7:00 p.m., P12N		at Oregon	L 69–75	12–10 (4–7)	23 – da Silva	7 – O'Brien	4 – Simpson	Matthew Knight Arena (5,680); Eugene, OR
January 28, 2023; 8:30 p.m., P12N		at Oregon State	L 52–60	12–11 (4–8)	22 – da Silva	15 – da Silva	2 – da Silva	Gill Coliseum (3,789); Corvallis, OR
February 2, 2023; 8:00 p.m., P12N		California	W 59–46	13–11 (5–8)	20 – da Silva	7 – O’Brien	4 – Simpson	CU Events Center (6,712); Boulder, CO
February 5, 2023; 5:00 p.m., FS1		Stanford	W 84–62	14–11 (6–8)	21 – Simpson	8 – Lovering	4 – Simpson	CU Events Center (6,974); Boulder, CO
February 11, 2023; 8:00 p.m., FS1		at Utah	L 62–73	14–12 (6–9)	14 – Simpson	6 – O'Brien	5 – Simpson	Jon M. Huntsman Center (6,133); Salt Lake City, UT
February 16, 2023; 6:00 p.m., P12N		at Arizona State	W 67–59	15–12 (7–9)	23 – da Silva	10 – O’Brien	3 – Tied	Desert Financial Arena (7,501); Tempe, AZ
February 18, 2023; 6:00 p.m., ESPN2		at No. 8 Arizona	L 68–78	15–13 (7–10)	18 – da Silva	9 – O'Brien	7 – Simpson	McKale Center (14,688); Tucson, AZ
February 23, 2023; 7:00 p.m., ESPN2		USC	L 65–84	15–14 (7–11)	18 – Simpson	7 – Lovering	5 – Simpson	CU Events Center (6,638); Boulder, CO
February 26, 2023; 2:00 p.m., CBS		No. 4 UCLA	L 56–60	15–15 (7–12)	14 – Simpson	10 – O'Brien	3 – Wright	CU Events Center (8,680); Boulder, CO
March 4, 2023; 3:30 p.m., P12N		Utah	W 69–60	16–15 (8–12)	15 – Hammond	11 – Clifford	5 – Hammond	CU Events Center (8,432); Boulder, CO
Pac-12 Tournament
March 8, 2023; 1:00 p.m., P12N	(9)	vs. (8) Washington; First Round	W 74–68	17–15	21 – Hammond	10 – O’Brien	5 – da Silva	T-Mobile Arena (7,469); Paradise, NV
March 9, 2023; 1:00 p.m., P12N	(9)	vs. (1) No. 2 UCLA; Quarterfinals	L 69–80	17–16	17 – da Silva	7 – O'Brien	6 – Hammond	T-Mobile Arena (10,406); Paradise, NV
NIT tournament
March 14, 2023; 9:00 p.m., ESPN2	(3)	Seton Hall; First Round – Rutgers Bracket	W 65–64	18–16	18 – Wright	14 – O'Brien	5 – Hammond	CU Events Center (2,363); Boulder, CO
March 19, 2023; 7:30 p.m., ESPNU	(3)	Utah Valley; Second Round – Rutgers Bracket	L 69–81	18–17	21 – Lovering	7 – Lovering	4 – O'Brien	CU Events Center (3,964); Boulder, CO
*Non-conference game. ^{#}Rankings from AP Poll. (#) Tournament seedings in parentheses. All times are in Mountain Time.

== Rankings ==
Ranking movements Legend: ██ Increase in ranking ██ Decrease in ranking — = Not ranked RV = Received votes
	Week																				
Poll	Pre	1	2	3	4	5	6	7	8	9	10	11	12	13	14	15	16	17	18	19	Final
AP	—	—	RV	—	—	—	—	—	—	—	—	—	—	—	—	—	—	—	—	—	Not released
Coaches	—	—	—	—	—	—	—	—	—	—	—	—	—	—	—	—	—	—	—	—	—
