= 2022–23 Wisconsin Badgers men's basketball team =

American college basketball season

2022–23 Wisconsin Badgers men's basketball

NIT, Semifinals
- Conference: Big Ten Conference
- Record: 20–15 (9–11 Big Ten)
- Head coach: Greg Gard (8th season)
- Associate head coach: Joe Krabbenhoft
- Assistant coaches: Dean Oliver; Sharif Chambliss
- Home arena: Kohl Center

2022–23 Big Ten Conference men's basketball standings
	Conf.				Overall
Team	W		L	PCT	W		L	PCT
No. 3 Purdue †	15	–	5	.750	29	–	6	.829
No. 21 Indiana	12	–	8	.600	23	–	12	.657
Northwestern	12	–	8	.600	22	–	12	.647
Michigan State	11	–	8	.579	21	–	13	.618
Maryland	11	–	9	.550	22	–	13	.629
Illinois	11	–	9	.550	20	–	13	.606
Iowa	11	–	9	.550	19	–	14	.576
Michigan	11	–	9	.550	18	–	16	.529
Penn State	10	–	10	.500	23	–	14	.622
Rutgers	10	–	10	.500	19	–	15	.559
Wisconsin	9	–	11	.450	20	–	15	.571
Nebraska	9	–	11	.450	16	–	16	.500
Ohio State	5	–	15	.250	16	–	19	.457
Minnesota	2	–	17	.105	9	–	22	.290
† Conference tournament winner Rankings from AP poll

The 2022–23 Wisconsin Badgers men's basketball team represented the University of Wisconsin–Madison in the 2022–23 NCAA Division I men's basketball season. The Badgers were led by eighth-year head coach Greg Gard and played their home games at the Kohl Center in Madison, Wisconsin as members of the Big Ten Conference. They finished the regular season 17–13, 9–11 in Big Ten play to finish in a tie for 11th place. As the No. 12 seed in the Big Ten tournament, they lost to Ohio State in the first round. They received an at-large bid to the National Invitation Tournament where they defeated Bradley, Liberty, and Oregon to advance to the tournament semifinals. There they lost to eventual champion North Texas.

== Previous season ==
The Badgers finished the 2021–22 season 25–8, 15–5 in Big Ten play to finish in a tie for first place. As the No. 2 seed in the Big Ten Tournament, they lost to Michigan State in the quarterfinals. They received an at-large bid to the NCAA tournament, their 26th trip to the NCAA Tournament, as the No. 3 seed in the Midwest region. The Badgers defeated Colgate in the First Round before losing to Iowa State in the Second Round.

== Offseason ==
=== Departures ===
All players listed as "graduated" are tentative departures unless otherwise noted.

Wisconsin Departures
Name	Number	Pos.	Height	Weight	Year	Hometown	Reason for Departure
Johnny Davis	1	G	6'5"	194	Sophomore	La Crosse, WI	Declared for 2022 NBA draft/Selected 10th overall by Washington Wizards
Carter Higginbottom	4	G	6'0"	193	(redshirt) Junior	Chicago, IL	Graduated
Lorne Bowman II	11	G	6'2"	210	Freshman	Detroit, MI	Transferred to Oakland
Ben Carlson	20	F	6'9"	226	Sophomore	Woodbury, MN	Transferred to Utah
Matthew Mors	32	F	6'7"	241	Freshman	Yankton, SD	Transferred to South Dakota State
Chris Vogt	33	C	7'0"	257	Graduate Student	Mayfield, KY	Graduated
Brad Davison	34	G	6'4"	200	Graduate Student	Maple Grove, MN	Graduated

=== Incoming transfers ===
Wisconsin incoming transfers
Name	Number	Pos.	Height	Weight	Year	Hometown	Previous School
Max Klesmit	11	G	6'3"	190	Junior	Neenah, WI	Wofford
Kamari McGee	4	G	6'0"	170	Sophomore	Racine, WI	Green Bay

=== 2022 recruiting class ===
College recruiting
Name	Hometown	School	Height	Weight	Commit date
Connor Essegian; G	Albion, IN	Central Noble High School	6 ft 4 in (1.93 m)	180 lb (82 kg)	Sep 15, 2021
Connor Essegian; G	Recruit ratings: Scout: Rivals: 247Sports: (78)				
Overall recruit ranking:
Note: In many cases, Scout, Rivals, 247Sports, On3, and ESPN may conflict in their listings of height and weight.; In these cases, the average was taken. ESPN grades are on a 100-point scale.; Sources: "2022 Wisconsin Commitments". Rivals.; "Men's Basketball Recruiting". Scout.; "ESPN- Wisconsin Badgers Men's Basketball Recruiting". ESPN.; "Scout.com Team Recruiting Rankings". Scout.; "2022 Team Ranking". Rivals.

== Roster ==
2022–23 Wisconsin Badgers men's basketball team
Players
Coaches

Pos.	#	Name	Height	Weight	Year	Previous school	Hometown
G	0	Jahcobi Neath (injured)	6 ft 4 in (1.93 m)	190 lb (86 kg)	Jr	Crestwood Prep/Wake Forest	Toronto, Ontario
G	2	Jordan Davis	6 ft 4 in (1.93 m)	200 lb (91 kg)	Jr	La Crosse Central High School	La Crosse, Wisconsin
G	3	Connor Essegian	6 ft 4 in (1.93 m)	185 lb (84 kg)	Fr	Central Noble High School	Fort Wayne, Indiana
G	4	Kamari McGee	6 ft 0 in (1.83 m)	180 lb (82 kg)	So	St. Catherine's High School/Green Bay	Racine, Wisconsin
F	5	Tyler Wahl	6 ft 9 in (2.06 m)	225 lb (102 kg)	Sr	North High School	Lakeville, Minnesota
G	10	Isaac Lindsey	6 ft 4 in (1.93 m)	185 lb (84 kg)	RS So	Mineral Point High School/UNLV	Mineral Point, Wisconsin
G	11	Max Klesmit	6 ft 3 in (1.91 m)	200 lb (91 kg)	Jr	Neenah High School/Wofford	Neenah, Wisconsin
G	12	Luke Haertle (W)	6 ft 3 in (1.91 m)	215 lb (98 kg)	Fr	Lake Country Lutheran	Hartland, Wisconsin
G	13	Justin Taphorn (W)	6 ft 5 in (1.96 m)	215 lb (98 kg)	Jr	Pekin High School	Pekin, Illinois
F	14	Carter Gilmore	6 ft 7 in (2.01 m)	225 lb (102 kg)	Jr	Arrowhead High School	Hartland, Wisconsin
G	15	Isaac Gard (W)	6 ft 2 in (1.88 m)	165 lb (75 kg)	Fr	Oregon High School	Oregon, Wisconsin
F	21	Chris Hodges	6 ft 9 in (2.06 m)	245 lb (111 kg)	RS Fr	Schaumburg High School	Schaumburg, Illinois
F	22	Steven Crowl	7 ft 0 in (2.13 m)	245 lb (111 kg)	Jr	Eastview High School	Eagan, Minnesota
G	23	Chucky Hepburn	6 ft 2 in (1.88 m)	205 lb (93 kg)	So	Bellevue West High School	Omaha, Nebraska
G	30	Ross Candelino (W)	6 ft 5 in (1.96 m)	185 lb (84 kg)	Fr	Ponte Vedra High School	Jacksonville, Florida
F	35	Markus Ilver	6 ft 8 in (2.03 m)	215 lb (98 kg)	So	Western Reserve Academy	Tallinn, Estonia

Head coach

- Greg Gard (UW-Platteville)

Assistant coach(es)

- Joe Krabbenhoft (Wisconsin)
- Dean Oliver (Iowa)
- Sharif Chambliss (Wisconsin)

Legend

- (C) Team captain
- (S) Suspended
- (I) Ineligible
- (W) Walk-on
- Injured
- Current redshirt

Roster

== Schedule and results ==
Date time, TV	Rank^{#}	Opponent^{#}	Result	Record	High points	High rebounds	High assists	Site (attendance) city, state
France trip
August 10, 2022*; 10:00 a.m.		at Paris Towers; France Tour	W 82–66	–	13 – Crowl	8 – Tied	4 – Gilmore	Paris, FRA
August 12, 2022*; 12:00 p.m.		at Lyon Towers; France Tour	W 80–68	–	12 – Wahl	–	–	Lyon, FRA
August 13, 2022*; 12:00 p.m.		at Lyon Towers; France Tour	W 78–47	–	14 – Ilver	–	–	Lyon, FRA
August 15, 2022*; 12:00 p.m.		at Azurea Club de Golfe; France Tour	W 85–69	–	14 – Tied	–	–	Vallauris, FRA
Exhibition
October 30, 2022*; 11:30 a.m., BTN+		Wisconsin–Eau Claire	W 76–45		14 – Crowl	6 – Crowl	5 – Wahl	Kohl Center; Madison, WI
Regular season
November 7, 2022*; 7:30 p.m., BTN		South Dakota	W 85–59	1–0	19 – Wahl	10 – Wahl	4 – Wahl	Kohl Center (14,349); Madison, WI
November 11, 2022*; 6:30 p.m., FS1		vs. Stanford; Brew City Battle	W 60–50	2–0	17 – Wahl	11 – Crowl	5 – Hepburn	American Family Field (17,927); Milwaukee, WI
November 15, 2022*; 8:00 p.m., BTN		Green Bay	W 56–45	3–0	11 – Davis	9 – Tied	3 – Hepburn	Kohl Center (14,204); Madison, WI
November 23, 2022*; 1:30 p.m., ESPN2		vs. Dayton; Battle 4 Atlantis quarterfinal	W 43–42	4–0	13 – Essegian	8 – Davis	4 – Crowl	Imperial Arena (1,047); Nassau, Bahamas
November 24, 2022*; 10:00 a.m., ESPN		vs. No. 3 Kansas; Battle 4 Atlantis semifinal	L 68–69 ^{OT}	4–1	23 – Wahl	10 – Wahl	3 – Crowl	Imperial Arena (1,185); Nassau, Bahamas
November 25, 2022*; 12:00 p.m., ESPN2		vs. USC; Battle 4 Atlantis 3rd place game	W 64–59	5–1	17 – Hepburn	9 – Wahl	4 – Hepburn	Imperial Arena (510); Nassau, Bahamas
November 29, 2022*; 8:00 p.m., ESPNU		Wake Forest; ACC–Big Ten Challenge	L 75–78	5–2	23 – Hepburn	7 – Crowl	3 – Tied	Kohl Center (14,435); Madison, WI
December 3, 2022*; 3:30 p.m., FS1		at Marquette; Rivalry	W 80–77 ^{OT}	6–2	19 – Hepburn	7 – Wahl	7 – Crowl	Fiserv Forum (17,760); Milwaukee, WI
December 6, 2022; 8:00 p.m., ESPN2		No. 13 Maryland	W 64–59	7–2 (1–0)	13 – Hepburn	6 – Tied	3 – Tied	Kohl Center; Madison, WI
December 11, 2022; 5:30 p.m., BTN		at Iowa	W 78–75 ^{OT}	8–2 (2–0)	21 – Wahl	7 – Wahl	7 – Crowl	Carver–Hawkeye Arena (12,430); Iowa City, IA
December 15, 2022*; 6:00 p.m., BTN	No. 22	Lehigh	W 78–56	9–2	15 – Crowl	7 – Wahl	4 – Tied	Kohl Center (12,760); Madison, WI
December 23, 2022*; 8:00 p.m., BTN	No. 17	Grambling State	Canceled due to weather					Kohl Center; Madison, WI
December 30, 2022*; 7:00 p.m., BTN+	No. 15	Western Michigan	W 76–66	10–2	25 – Crowl	8 – Crowl	5 – Hepburn	Kohl Center (15,138); Madison, WI
January 3, 2023; 8:00 p.m., BTN	No. 14	Minnesota	W 63–60	11–2 (3–0)	17 – Crowl	8 – Davis	4 – Hepburn	Kohl Center (13,850); Madison, WI
January 7, 2023; 12:30 p.m., ESPN2	No. 14	at Illinois	L 69–79	11–3 (3–1)	22 – Hepburn	12 – Crowl	7 – Hepburn	State Farm Center (15,544); Champaign, IL
January 10, 2023; 6:00 p.m., ESPN	No. 18	Michigan State	L 65–69	11–4 (3–2)	19 – Crowl	4 – Lindsey	5 – Hepburn	Kohl Center (14,260); Madison, WI
January 14, 2023; 12:00 p.m., CBS	No. 18	at Indiana	L 45–63	11–5 (3–3)	14 – Essegian	11 – Essegian	2 – Hepburn	Simon Skjodt Assembly Hall (17,222); Bloomington, IN
January 17, 2023; 7:30 p.m., BTN		Penn State	W 63–60	12–5 (4–3)	21 – Crowl	11 – Crowl	3 – Hepburn	Kohl Center (14,236); Madison, WI
January 23, 2023; 5:30 p.m., BTN		at Northwestern	L 63–66	12–6 (4–4)	15 – Davis	9 – Crowl	5 – Hepburn	Welsh–Ryan Arena (4,218); Evanston, IL
January 25, 2023; 6:00 p.m., BTN		at Maryland	L 55–73	12–7 (4–5)	19 – Essegian	4 – Tied	4 – Hepburn	Xfinity Center (14,407); College Park, MD
January 28, 2023; 1:00 p.m., FOX		Illinois	L 51–61	12–8 (4–6)	15 – Hepburn	8 – Klesmit	2 – Tied	Kohl Center (17,071); Madison, WI
February 2, 2023; 6:00 p.m., FS1		at Ohio State	W 65–60	13–8 (5–6)	17 – Essegian	9 – Crowl	3 – Hepburn	Value City Arena (11,918); Columbus, OH
February 5, 2023; 5:30 p.m., BTN		Northwestern	L 52–54	13–9 (5–7)	17 – Hepburn	8 – Crowl	4 – Tied	Kohl Center (15,632); Madison, WI
February 8, 2023; 7:30 p.m., BTN		at Penn State	W 79–74 ^{OT}	14–9 (6–7)	19 – Hepburn	8 – Crowl	8 – Wahl	Bryce Jordan Center (7,213); University Park, PA
February 11, 2023; 3:00 p.m., BTN		at Nebraska	L 63–73 ^{OT}	14–10 (6–8)	19 – Hepburn	9 – Crowl	5 – Wahl	Pinnacle Bank Arena (14,811); Lincoln, NE
February 14, 2023; 8:00 p.m., ESPN2		Michigan	W 64–59	15–10 (7–8)	23 – Essegian	12 – Crowl	6 – Crowl	Kohl Center (15,436); Madison, WI
February 18, 2023; 11:00 a.m., BTN		Rutgers	L 57–58	15–11 (7–9)	14 – Davis	11 – Crowl	6 – Wahl	Kohl Center (17,071); Madison, WI
February 22, 2023; 8:00 p.m., BTN		Iowa	W 64–52	16–11 (8–9)	17 – Essegian	14 – Wahl	5 – Hepburn	Kohl Center (16,029); Madison, WI
February 26, 2023; 1:00 p.m., CBS		at Michigan	L 79–87 ^{OT}	16–12 (8–10)	24 – Essegian	11 – Wahl	4 – Hepburn	Crisler Center (12,707); Ann Arbor, MI
March 2, 2023; 8:00 p.m., FS1		No. 5 Purdue	L 61–63	16–13 (8–11)	19 – Klesmit	6 – Crowl	4 – Wahl	Kohl Center (17,071); Madison, WI
March 5, 2023; 6:30 p.m., FS1		at Minnesota	W 71–67	17–13 (9–11)	21 – Tied	7 – Tied	3 – Klesmit	Williams Arena (12,276); Minneapolis, MN
Big Ten tournament
March 8, 2023; 5:30 p.m., BTN	(12)	vs. (13) Ohio State; First round	L 57–65	17–14	19 – Wahl	10 – Wahl	3 – Tied	United Center; Chicago, IL
NIT
March 14, 2023; 8:30 p.m., ESPN	(2)	Bradley; First Round – Oregon Bracket	W 81–62	18–14	36 – Crowl	9 – Crowl	5 – Hepburn	Kohl Center (3,919); Madison, WI
March 19, 2023; 11:00 am, ESPN2/ESPN+	(2)	(3) Liberty; Second Round – Oregon Bracket	W 75–71	19–14	27 – Hepburn	6 – Wahl	2 – Crowl	Kohl Center (10,436); Madison, WI
March 21, 2023; 8:00 p.m., ESPN	(2)	at (1) Oregon; Quarterfinals – Oregon Bracket	W 61–58	20–14	18 – Klesmit	10 – Crowl	6 – Wahl	Matthew Knight Arena (3,384); Eugene, OR
March 28, 2023; 6:00 p.m., ESPN	(2)	vs. (2) North Texas; Semifinals	L 54–56	20–15	15 – Hepburn	8 – Crowl	4 – Hepburn	Orleans Arena; Paradise, NV
*Non-conference game. ^{#}Rankings from AP Poll. (#) Tournament seedings in parentheses. All times are in Central Time.

== Rankings ==
Ranking movements Legend: ██ Increase in ranking ██ Decrease in ranking — = Not ranked RV = Received votes т = Tied with team above or below
	Week																			
Poll	Pre	1	2	3	4	5	6	7	8	9	10	11	12	13	14	15	16	17	18	Final
AP	—	—	—	RV	RV	22	17	15	14	18	RV	RV	RV	—	—	—	—	—	—	Not released
Coaches	RV	RV	RV	RV	RV	23т	18	15	15	18	RV	RV	—	—	—	—	—	—	—	—

*AP does not release post-NCAA Tournament rankings.

== Player statistics ==
Individual player statistics (final)
			Minutes		Scoring		Total FGs			3-point FGs			Free Throws			Rebounds								
Player	GP	GS	Tot	Avg	Pts	Avg	FG	FGA	Pct	3FG	3FA	Pct	FT	FTA	Pct	Off	Def	Tot	Avg	A	TO	Blk	Stl	PF
Hepburn, Chucky	35	35	1119	32.0	428	12.2	152	403	.377	68	168	.405	56	78	.718	16	83	99	2.8	99	52	2	52	75
Crowl, Steven	35	35	1069	30.5	425	12.1	173	339	.510	27	88	.307	52	82	.634	53	190	243	6.9	86	56	17	12	74
Essegian, Connor	35	19	954	27.3	411	11.7	133	329	.404	69	192	.359	76	86	.884	24	107	131	3.7	26	36	1	19	60
Wahl, Tyler	32	32	1008	31.5	361	11.3	134	317	.423	10	34	.294	83	131	.634	50	151	201	6.3	81	71	14	39	84
Klesmit, Max	33	33	1059	32.1	276	8.4	91	215	.423	46	120	.383	48	69	.696	11	77	88	2.7	45	32	6	41	78
Davis, Jordan	35	18	722	20.6	179	5.1	69	173	.399	32	104	.308	9	15	.600	30	93	123	3.5	14	8	4	13	52
Gilmore, Carter	35	3	660	18.9	91	2.6	37	91	.407	5	26	.192	12	27	.444	37	50	87	2.5	33	12	6	19	71
Ilver, Markus	18	0	118	6.6	29	1.6	11	37	.297	5	21	.238	2	2	1.000	5	12	17	0.9	3	2	0	1	10
Lindsey, Isaac	24	0	142	5.9	35	1.5	13	41	.317	8	24	.333	1	2	.500	3	15	18	0.8	2	2	1	3	20
McGee, Kamari	31	0	226	7.3	40	1.3	14	50	.280	5	27	.185	7	8	.875	4	16	20	0.6	16	8	0	7	24
Neath, Jahcobi	3	0	27	9.0	3	1.0	1	4	.250	1	2	.500	0	0	.–––	0	1	1	0.3	1	2	0	1	2
Candelino, Ross	5	0	5	1.0	4	0.8	2	2	1.000	0	0	.–––	0	1	.000	0	3	3	0.6	0	0	0	0	0
Hodges, Chris	14	0	30	2.1	2	0.2	1	3	.333	0	0	.–––	0	0	.–––	2	1	3	0.2	0	0	1	0	3
Gard, Isaac	5	0	5	1.0	0	0.0	0	1	.000	0	1	.000	0	0	.–––	0	0	0	0.0	0	0	0	0	1
Taphorn, Justin	5	0	6	1.2	0	0.0	0	0	.-––	0	0	.-––	0	0	.–––	0	0	0	0.0	0	0	0	0	0
Total	35	-	7150	-	2284	65.3	831	2005	.414	276	807	.342	346	501	.691	278	832	1110	31.7	406	302	52	207	554
Opponents	35	-	7150	-	2225	63.6	831	1871	.444	217	686	.316	346	515	.672	276	952	1228	35.1	358	413	125	158	569

Legend
GP	Games played	GS	Games started	Avg	Average per game
FG	Field-goals made	FGA	Field-goal attempts	Off	Offensive rebounds
Def	Defensive rebounds	A	Assists	TO	Turnovers
Blk	Blocks	Stl	Steals	High	Team high
