= Dennis Avery (politician) =

American politician from Indiana (born 1946)

Member of the Indiana House of Representatives from the 75th district
- In office November 3, 1982 – November 3, 2010
- Preceded by: Vaneta Becker
- Succeeded by: Ronald Bacon

Member of the Indiana House of Representatives from the 72nd district
- In office November 6, 1974 – November 3, 1982
- Preceded by: Robert Lee Rickard Jr
- Succeeded by: William Cochran

Personal details
- Born: Dennis Theodore Avery; September 28, 1946 (age 79) Evansville, Indiana, U.S.
- Party: Democratic
- Spouse: Patty
- Education: University of Evansville
- Occupation: University of Southern Indiana Adult Marketing Coordinator

Dennis Theodore Avery (born September 28, 1946) is an American retired politician who was a Democratic member of the Indiana House of Representatives, representing the 75th District from 1974 until 2010. He did not seek reelection in 2010.
