= Central Noble High School =

Central Noble Junior-Senior High School

Location
- 302 Cougar Court; Albion, Noble County, Indiana 46701; United States
- 41°23′54″N 85°25′08″W

Information
- Type: Public high school
- School district: Central Noble Community School Corporation
- Principal: Shawn Hoover
- Faculty: 43.50 (FTE (2024–2025)
- Grades: 6–12
- Enrollment: 610 (2024–2025)
- Student to teacher ratio: 14.02 (2024–2025)
- Color
- Athletics conference: Northeast Corner Conference of Indiana
- Team name: Cougars
- Rivals: Churubusco Jr/Sr High School
- Website: www.centralnoble.k12.in.us/cnjshs/

Central Noble Junior-Senior High School is a public high school in the town of Albion, Indiana, United States. It is the high school for the Central Noble Community Schools. Students from Albion Elementary, Wolf Lake Elementary, and Central Noble Middle School are sent to the high school after passing the eighth grade.

== Athletics ==
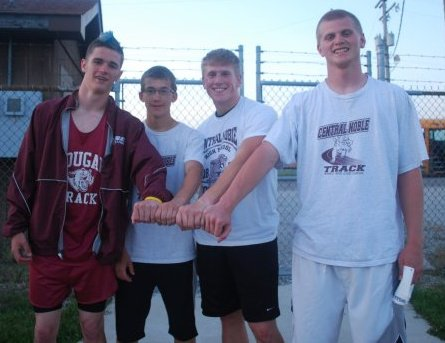
Central Noble High School Track and Field Athletes.

Central Noble High School sports operate under the Indiana High School Athletic Association (IHSAA), in the Northeast Corner Conference (NECC). Students have many opportunities to play sports at the high school. To be eligible to play a sport at CNHS, a student may have at most one failing grade. A grade check to determine eligibility is performed at the start of the semester preceding the sport the student wishes to play. The sports at CNHS are listed below:

Fall:

- Football (Boys)
- Cross Country (Co-ed)
- Tennis (Boys)
- Volleyball (Girls)
- Soccer (Boys)
- Soccer (Girls)
- Cheerleading (Girls)

Winter:

- Basketball (Boys)
- Basketball (Girls) 2018 IHSAA 2A State Champions
- Wrestling (Co-ed)
- Cheerleading (Girls)

Spring:

- Track and Field (Boys)
- Track and Field (Girls)
- Tennis (Girls)
- Golf (Boys)
- Baseball (Boys)
- Softball (Girls)

== Alumni ==
- David Ober (2005) – Former member of the Indiana House of Representatives from the 82nd district, and current member of the Indiana Utility Regulatory Commission.
- Connor Essegian – Basketball player for the Wisconsin Badgers Men's basketball team, who broke the freshmen three-point record with currently 61 three-point shots made.

== See also ==
- List of high schools in Indiana
