= 2022–23 Michigan State Spartans men's basketball team =

American college basketball season

2022–23 Michigan State Spartans men's basketball

NCAA tournament, Sweet Sixteen
- Conference: Big Ten Conference

Ranking
- Coaches: No. 20
- Record: 21–13 (11–8 Big Ten)
- Head coach: Tom Izzo (28th season)
- Assistant coaches: Doug Wojcik (4th overall season); Mark Montgomery (12th overall season); Thomas Kelley (1st season)
- Home arena: Breslin Center

2022–23 Big Ten Conference men's basketball standings
| | Conf. | | | | Overall |
| Team | W | | L | PCT | W | | L | PCT |
|---|---|---|---|---|---|---|---|---|
| No. 3 Purdue † | 15 | – | 5 | .750 | 29 | – | 6 | .829 |
| No. 21 Indiana | 12 | – | 8 | .600 | 23 | – | 12 | .657 |
| Northwestern | 12 | – | 8 | .600 | 22 | – | 12 | .647 |
| Michigan State | 11 | – | 8 | .579 | 21 | – | 13 | .618 |
| Maryland | 11 | – | 9 | .550 | 22 | – | 13 | .629 |
| Illinois | 11 | – | 9 | .550 | 20 | – | 13 | .606 |
| Iowa | 11 | – | 9 | .550 | 19 | – | 14 | .576 |
| Michigan | 11 | – | 9 | .550 | 18 | – | 16 | .529 |
| Penn State | 10 | – | 10 | .500 | 23 | – | 14 | .622 |
| Rutgers | 10 | – | 10 | .500 | 19 | – | 15 | .559 |
| Wisconsin | 9 | – | 11 | .450 | 20 | – | 15 | .571 |
| Nebraska | 9 | – | 11 | .450 | 16 | – | 16 | .500 |
| Ohio State | 5 | – | 15 | .250 | 16 | – | 19 | .457 |
| Minnesota | 2 | – | 17 | .105 | 9 | – | 22 | .290 |
† Conference tournament winner Rankings from AP poll

The 2022–23 Michigan State Spartans men's basketball team represented Michigan State University in the 2022–23 NCAA Division I men's basketball season. The Spartans were led by 28th-year head coach Tom Izzo and played their home games at Breslin Center in East Lansing, Michigan as members of the Big Ten Conference. MSU finished the season 21–13, 11–8 in Big Ten play to finish in fourth place. They lost in the quarterfinals of the Big Ten tournament to Ohio State. They received an at-large bid to the NCAA tournament as the No. 7 seed in the East region. This marked the school's 25th straight selection to the NCAA tournament making it the third longest streak, second longest active streak, and the longest streak by a coach in men's basketball ever. The Spartans defeated USC and Marquette to advance to their first Sweet Sixteen since 2019. There they lost to Kansas State.

On August 11, 2022, the school announced that it had signed Izzo to a five-year $31 million contract extension making him one of the highest-paid coaches in the nation.

== Previous season ==
The Spartans finished the 2021–22 NCAA Division I men's basketball season 23–13, 11–9 in Big Ten play to finish in a tie for seventh place. As the No. 7 seed in the Big Ten tournament, they defeated Maryland and Wisconsin to advance to the semifinals where they lost to Purdue. They received an at-large bid to the NCAA tournament as the No. 7 seed in the West region, marking MSU's 24th straight trip to the NCAA tournament, the second longest active streak. They defeated Davidson in the First Round before losing to Duke in the Second Round. The Spartans were led by Gabe Brown who averaged 11.6 points per game.

With a win over Toledo on December 4, 2021, Izzo earned his 650th win as head coach of the Spartans. With a win over Maryland on March 6, 2022, Izzo surpassed Bob Knight for the most wins by a men's basketball coach at a Big Ten school with 663.

== Offseason ==
=== Coaching changes ===
On April 4, 2022, associate head coach Dwayne Stephens left the team after 19 years as an assistant coach to accept the head coaching position at Western Michigan. On June 3, the school announced that former MSU player and graduate assistant Thomas Kelley had been hired to replace Stephens. Kelley had been an assistant at Western Michigan and had been retained by Stephens when he took over at WMU.

On June 9, the school announced that former assistant coach Mike Garland, who had transitioned to a special assistant to the head coach for the 2021–22 season, had retired. Garland had been with Izzo and the MSU program for 22 seasons.

On August 1, the school announced that Jon Borovich had been hired at the team's Director of Recruiting.

=== Departures ===
On March 26, 2022, senior forward Gabe Brown announced he would not return to MSU to take advantage of an extra year of eligibility granted by the NCAA due to the COVID-19 pandemic and declared for the NBA draft. Also on March 26, center Marcus Bingham Jr. announced he would also declare for the draft. Neither player was selected in the draft.

On April 1, guard Max Christie announced he would enter the NBA draft process and on May 16 announced he would hire an agent and remain in the draft. Christie was selected in the second round by the Los Angeles Lakers.

Also on April 1, former walk-on guard, Davis Smith, son for MSU great Steve Smith, announced he had entered the transfer portal. On May 2, he withdrew his name from the portal. On April 19, forward Julius Marble announced he had entered the transfer portal as well. On May 2, he announced he was transferring to Texas A&M. Walk-on forward Peter Nwoke announced he would transfer to Southern Indiana.

Departures
| Name | No. | Pos. | Height | Weight | Year | Hometown | Notes |
|---|---|---|---|---|---|---|---|
| Marcus Bingham Jr. | 30 | C | 7'0" | 230 | SR | Farmington, MI | NBA draft |
| Gabe Brown | 44 | F | 6'6" | 225 | SR | Ypsilanti, MI | NBA draft |
| Max Christie | 5 | F | 6'6" | 190 | FR | Arlington Heights, IL | NBA draft |
| Julius Marble II | 34 | F | 6'8" | 245 | JR | Dallas, TX | Transferred to Texas A&M |
| Peter Nwoke | 35 | F | 6'7" | 215 | FR | Lagos, Nigeria | Transferred to Southern Indiana |

=== Returning players ===
On April 20, forward Joey Hauser announced he would return to MSU, taking advantage of the extra year of COVID-19 eligibility.

=== Recruiting class ===
On August 7, 2021, four-star point guard Trejuan Holloman announced that he would attend MSU in 2022. On September 19, four-star forward Jaxon Kohler committed to play for the Spartans in 2022. On May 8, 2022, two-star center Carson Cooper, considered a "late bloomer" in the recruiting world, committed to the Spartans.

College recruiting
| Name | Hometown | School | Height | Weight | Commit date |
|---|---|---|---|---|---|
| Carson Cooper; C | Jackson, MI | IMG Academy | 6 ft 11 in (2.11 m) | 210 lb (95 kg) | May 8, 2022 |
| Carson Cooper; C | Recruit ratings: Scout: Rivals: 247Sports: (NR) | | | | |
| Trejuan Holloman; PG | St. Paul, MN | Cretin-Derham Hall High School | 6 ft 2 in (1.88 m) | 175 lb (79 kg) | Nov 10, 2021 |
| Trejuan Holloman; PG | Recruit ratings: Rivals: 247Sports: (82) | | | | |
| Jaxon Kohler; F | American Fork, UT | Southern California Academy | 6 ft 9 in (2.06 m) | 250 lb (110 kg) | Nov 10, 2021 |
| Jaxon Kohler; F | Recruit ratings: Rivals: 247Sports: (88) | | | | |
Overall recruit ranking:
Note: In many cases, Scout, Rivals, 247Sports, On3, and ESPN may conflict in their listings of height and weight.; In these cases, the average was taken. ESPN grades are on a 100-point scale.; Sources:

== Preseason ==
=== Preseason Big Ten poll ===
Prior to the conference's annual media day, unofficial awards and a poll were chosen by a panel of writers. Michigan State was picked to finish fourth in the conference.

=== Preseason rankings ===
The Spartans were not ranked in the preseason AP poll for the second consecutive year. This marked the first time since 1996 that MSU was unranked in the preseason poll in back-to-back years.

=== Injuries ===
On September 13, 2022, the school announced that guard Jaden Akins had suffered a stress reaction in his left foot. Surgery was performed and it was expected he would miss four weeks. Prior to the first official practice of the year, it was announced the forward Malik Hall had a toe injury and would miss a couple of weeks.

=== Preseason scrimmage ===
Michigan State played Tennessee in a closed-door preseason scrimmage in Knoxville, Tennessee on October 23.

=== Exhibition ===
The Spartans played an exhibition game against Grand Valley State on November 1, 2022, at Breslin Center. After losing to the Lakers in a 2007 exhibition game, the Spartans trailed 36–31 at the half. Led by Malik Hall, who scored 15 points, the Spartans rallied to win in the second half 73–56. MSU, still without Jaden Akins, started AJ Hoggard, Tyson Walker, Hall, Joey Hauser and Mady Sissoko.

== Regular season ==
=== Early non-conference games ===
==== Northern Arizona ====
The Spartans begin the season playing Northern Arizona at Breslin Center on November 7, 2022. The Spartans beat the Lumberjacks easily 73–55 as Joey Hauser scored 18 points and added 10 rebounds in the easy win. Sophomore guard Pierre Brooks added 14 points while make four three-pointers for the Spartans. The win moved the Spartans to 1–0 on the season.

==== Gonzaga ====
The Spartans travelled to face No. 2-ranked Gonzaga on Veterans' Day on the aircraft carrier USS Abraham Lincoln (CVN-72). The Spartans played well, led by Mady Sissoko's 10 first-half points and let 38–31 at halftime. Shooting became more difficult as the sun set and cooler conditions set in, but the Spartans pushed their lead to as many as 12 early in the second half. However, foul trouble set in as Joey Hauser and Sissoko both fouled out while Malik Hall finished with four fouls. The Bulldogs' Drew Timme led Gonzaga back to a late lead, scoring 22 points to lead all scorers. Trailing by one with 31 seconds remaining, the Spartans called a timeout. But Tyson Walker, who scored 12 points and added three assists, slipped twice on the final play leaving Jaden Akins to take an off-balance three-pointer as the clock ran out and the Spartans lost 64–63. Sissoko finished with a career-high 14 points. AJ Hoggard added 12 points and six assists while Malik Hall scored 11 in the loss. The Spartans fell to 1–1 on the season.

==== Kentucky ====
MSU faced another top-five team, No. 4-ranked Kentucky, at Gainbridge Fieldhouse in the first game of the Champions Classic on November 15. The Spartans played well, keeping within striking distance of the Wildcats throughout the first half and led 36–34 at the half. In the second half, neither team could run away with the game and the Spartans trailed by two when Kentucky big man Oscar Tshiebwe blocked AJ Hoggard's layup attempt out of bounds with four seconds remaining. On the ensuing inbound play, Malik Hall found himself wide open in front of the basket for a dunk to tie the game and force overtime. After Tshiebwe fouled out in overtime, the Spartans again found themselves down by two with seven seconds remaining. Taking the ball out from under the Kentucky basket, Hoggard hit Walker breaking down the court who found Hall and was again wide open for a dunk to tie the game. In the second overtime, UK went up 76–73 before the Spartans closed the game on a 10–0 run including two dunks from Mady Sissoko on an assists from Walker. Joey Hauser led the Spartans with 23 points while Hall added 20 in the win. The 86–77 win moved MSU to 2–1 on the season.

==== Villanova ====
The Spartans returned home to face Villanova as part of the Gavitt Tipoff Games on November 18. MSU started the game well, leading for the majority of the first half and holding a 10-point lead at halftime. Tyson Walker led the Spartans with 22 points from all over the court, making three three-pointers and hitting six twos. The Spartans pushed the lead to as many as 16 with less than eight minutes remaining. However, the Wildcats closed the lead to one with 49 seconds left in the game. Walker made one of two free throws to push the lead to two with 16 seconds left and Villanova was forced into a long three-point attempt as the clock expired that fell short. As a result, the Spartans held on for the 73–71 win. Joey Hauser and AJ Hoggard each scored 13 for the Spartans while Malik Hall added 12 in the win. The win moved the Spartans to 3–1 on the season.

==== Phil Knight Invitational ====
===== Alabama =====
The newly ranked No. 12 (AP) Spartans traveled to face No. 18 Alabama at the Phil Knight Invitational in Portland on Thanksgiving Day. Prior to the game, the team announced the Malik Hall would be sidelined for about three weeks with a stress reaction in his left foot. The team also announced that Jaden Akins would likely miss the tournament after reinjuring his foot. Despite this, the Spartans kept the game close against the Crimson Tide for the first half and trailed by five at the break. In the second half, Alabama was able to pull away and secure an 81–70 win. Tyson Walker led the Spartans with 21 points while AJ Hoggard added 18. However, no other player scored in double figures for the Spartans in the loss. The loss dropped MSU to 3–2 on the season.

===== Oregon =====
As a result, the Spartans faced Oregon in the consolation round of the tournament on November 25. Tyson Walker again led the way for the Spartans, scoring 18 points while Joey Hauser also scored 18. Oregon, also suffering injuries that limited their roster, kept the game close throughout however. Pierre Brooks added 15 points while Hauser secured 10 rebounds as MSU held on for the 74–70 win. The win moved the Spartans to 4–2 on the season.

===== Portland =====
After a day off, the Spartans faced Portland, who had upset Villanova previously, in the fifth place game of the tournament. Portland shot the ball extremely well in the first half, and made 13 three-pointers in the game. MSU only had eight three-pointers, but converted on 57% of them to keep the game close. The Pilots pulled away for an eight-point halftime lead, but the Spartans responded in the second half with 10 straight points to erase the deficit. All five MSU starters scored in double figures and the Spartans led by double digits with three minutes remaining. However, the Pilots narrowed the lead to one after a miss by the Spartans with 8.1 seconds left. With a chance to tie it, AJ Hoggard forced a tough shot and punched the rebound out of the lane as the clock ran out to give MSU the 78–77 win. Tyson Walker again led the Spartans with 16 points while Pierre Brooks added 15 and Joey Hauser contributed 14. The win moved the Spartans to 5–2 on the season.

==== Notre Dame ====
The now 20th-ranked Spartans traveled to South Bend, Indiana to face Notre Dame on November 30 as part of the ACC–Big Ten Challenge. It was announced on November 28 that the challenge would not be renewed after the season due in large part to the Big Ten's new television contract with FOX. Still without Malik Hall and Jaden Akins, the Spartans were blown out by the Fighting Irish. Notre Dame took control early, shooting 42% from three in the game and held an 18-point lead at the half. In the second half, the Spartans were able to narrow the lead, but never were within single digits. The Spartans, who appeared fatigued after paying four straight games and six of the first eight games away from home, struggled offensively and defensively. AJ Hoggard led the Spartans with 15 points while Joey Hauser and Tyson Walker each scored 12 in the 70–52 loss. The loss dropped MSU to 5–3 on the season.

=== Early conference games ===
==== Northwestern ====
The Spartans opened Big Ten play on December 4 at home against Northwestern. Again playing without Malik Hall, but having Jaden Akins returning to the starting lineup, the Spartans continued to struggle. The Wildcats led by one at the half as MSU struggled on both ends of the court. In the second half, MSU could not putt he game away and, behind Boo Buie's 20 points, Northwestern pulled away for the 70–63 win. Joey Hauser played 38 minutes, but scored only 10 points on three of 12 shooting. Pierre Brooks also struggled from the floor, making only three of 10 shots. AJ Hoggard and Mady Sissoko each scored 12 to lead the Spartans. Akins played 23 minutes in the game, scoring only three points. The loss moved the Spartans to 5–4, 0–1 in conference play.

==== Penn State ====
After dropping from the rankings, the Spartans took to the road to face Penn State on December 7. Needing a win badly, the Spartans trailed for most of the first half as Penn State hit seven three-pointers. However, AJ Hoggard, who scored a career-high 23 points in the game, led a charge near the end of the half to leave the game tied at halftime. In the second half, Hoggard continued to lead the Spartans while the MSU defense limited the Nittany Lions to only one three-pointer. Tyson Walker added 14 points as the Spartans pulled away for a 67–58 win. Joey Hauser added 12 points and 15 rebounds in the win. MSU shot 42.3% from the field while limiting PSU to 34.5%. The win moved MSU to 6–4, 1–1 on the season.

=== Remaining non-conference games ===
==== Brown ====
The Spartans returned to Breslin Center for only their fourth home game of the season. MSU assistant coach Doug Wojcik's son, Paxon, and the Brown Bears came to East Lansing on December 10. Brown kept the game close early on, but the Spartans started to pull away late in the first half and led 32–18 at the half. The Spartans cruised from there, leading by as many as 26 in the second half as they held on for the easy 68–50 win. Joey Hauser led the Spartans with 22 points, including his 1,000th career point while AJ Hoggard added 17 points. MSU shot 42.2% from the field while limiting Brown to 33.3% including 10% from three. The win moved MSU to 7–4 on the season.

==== Oakland ====
After playing 10 games in the prior 30 days, the Spartans had 10 days off before playing Oakland on December 21. The game was close throughout the first half, with MSU taking an early lead and the Grizzlies responding to lead as well. The Spartans held Oakland without a point in the final six minutes of the first half and started the second half making their first five shots to pull out to a 22-point lead. MSU cooled off after that, but the Spartans held on for the win 67–54. MSU faced former Spartan Rocket Watts, now at his second team after leaving MSU following the 2020–21 season. Joey Hauser led MSU with 16 points while Mady Sissoko added a career-high 12 rebounds. Jaden Akins scored a career-high 15 in the win. The Spartans shot 49% from the field including $3.8% from three. MSU moved to 8–4 on the season with the win.

==== Buffalo ====
In the final non-conference game of the season, MSU hosted Buffalo on December 30. The game began with neither team shooting the ball well and exchanging leads. However, MSU started to shoot better thanks, in part, to Malik Hall returning to the court after missing eight straight games. The Spartans took an 11-point lead at the half, 41–30. Buffalo drew within three points with a little more than 17 minutes remaining before the Spartans took control again. The Spartans, led by Joey Hauser's 14 points, pushed the lead to as many as 26 with under three minutes remaining. Hauser notched a double double, adding 12 rebounds, while AJ Hoggard also had a double double with 11 points and 10 rebounds. Jaden Akins added 13 points while Hall scored 11 as MSU notched its highest scoring game of the season, winning 89–68. MSU shot over 42% from the three in the game and the win moved MSU to 9–4 on the season.

=== Remaining conference games ===
==== Nebraska ====
The Spartans stayed at home to face Big Ten foe Nebraska on January 3. Tyson Walker took over in the first half, scoring 16 points in the half as MSU limited Nebraska to only 17 points. MSU led 39–17 at the break after playing perhaps its best half of the season. The Cornhuskers countered early in the second half and drew within 12, but another MSU run put the game out of hand. Walker led all scorers with 21 points while Jaxon Kohler scored a career-high 10 points. Joey Hauser added another double double, notching 10 points and 10 rebounds. Malik Hall, in his second game back from injury, scored five points in 18 minutes. The Spartans dominated the glass, out-rebounding Nebraska 46–29 in the easy 74–56 win. The win moved the Spartans to 10–4 on the season and 2–1 in Big Ten play.

==== Michigan ====
The Spartans next faced rival Michigan at Breslin Center on January 7. The game remained close early as neither offense played well, however MSU took the lead at the half, 27–18. The Spartans held an opponent under 20 points in the first half for the second straight game. In the second half, the Spartans continued to lead, keeping the lead in double digits until there were less than 10 minutes remaining. However, led by Malik Hall and AJ Hoggard's 15 points each, the Wolverines never drew closer than four points. Joey Hauser struggled offensively, making only three of 13 shots, but still grabbed 10 rebounds for MSU. Tyson Walker added 13 for the Spartans as they held on for the 59–53 win. Michigan shot 34.5% from the field and made only three three-pointers in the loss. The win moved MSU to 11–4 and 3–1 in Big Ten play.

==== Wisconsin ====
MSU next took to the road to face No.18-ranked Wisconsin on January 10. The Spartans took an early lead and led until less than eight minutes remained in the half. Both teams shot the ball well in the first half, shooting over 40% from the field and Michigan State took a 33–31 lead at the half. The Badgers rallied in the second half to move to a lead as large as five with 4:14 left in the game. However, MSU scored on its final eight possessions to end the game and made 16 of 17 free throws in the game to edge out a 69–65 win. Joey Hauser, after struggling against Michigan, made six of eight shots and scored 20 to lead all scorers. AJ Hoggard hit key baskets late as part of his 10-point, eight-assist performance. Tyson Walker added 13 while Jaden Aikens scored 12 in the win. The Spartans shot over 52% from the field in the game and hit seven of 13 three-pointers to secure their seventh straight win. The win moved MSU to 12–4, 4–1 on the season and into a first-place tie in the Big Ten.

==== Illinois ====
The Spartans remained on the road to face Illinois on January 13. In a tight game throughout, the Spartans led for the majority of the game. But, due to Illinois' defense and a game plan to score in the paint, the Spartans attempted only seven three-pointers and did not make any. This marked the first time since 2021 that the Spartans had failed to make a three-pointer. Despite this, MSU led by as many as eight in the second half. However, the Illini tied it with a little more than nine minutes left. AJ Hoggard led the Spartans with 20 points while Tyson Walker scored. Joey Hauser scored 11 while no other Spartans score din double figures. Malik Hall appeared to turn his ankle with about seven minutes remaining, missing the remainder of the game, and Illini took over the game to win 75–66. The Spartans only had four assists in the game despite averaging 15.5 per game. The loss dropped the Spartans to 12–5, 4–2 in Big Ten play.

==== Purdue ====
The Spartans returned to Breslin to face No. 3-ranked Purdue on Martin Luther King Jr. Day. Prior to the game, Tom Izzo announced the Malik Hall could miss the remainder of the season due to a reaggravation of his foot injury that forced him to leave the prior game at Illinois. MSU started slow against Purdue, trailing by 13 with less than six minutes remaining in the first half. However, the Spartans rallied to pull within two at half time. In the second half, Michigan State took an early lead, but could not pull more than a possession or two away and the teams exchanged leads for most of the second half. After, making no three-pointers in the prior game, MSU made six with Tyson Walker making four of them. Walker scored 30 points in the game, hitting clutch shot after clutch shot. Player of the year candidate Zach Edey matched Walker and scored 32 in the game. The Spartans chose to stay home on most post touches by Edey, only rarely double teaming him. As a result, Edey accounted for half of Purdue's points. Trailing by one with 32 second left in the game, Walker hit a jumper with 12 seconds left to give MSU the 63–62 lead. However, Purdue was able to get the ball inside to Edey for a basket to give Purdue the one-point lead two seconds remaining. Walker got a good lock for Walker with a three-pointer to win it as time expired, but the shot fell short. As a result, the Spartans lost 64–63, their second straight loss. AJ Hoggard added 14 points and eight assists while Joey Hauser scored 10 in the loss. The loss dropped MSU to 12–6, 4–3 on the season.

==== Rutgers ====
MSU next played No. 23-ranked Rutgers on January 19 in East Lansing. The Spartans again started slow, falling behind by as many as eight on several occasions in the first five minutes. However, MSU rebounded quickly to tie and push to a six-point lead at the half. MSU shot well throughout the game, making 54% (12 of 22) of their three-pointers. On the other hand, Rutgers struggled mightily from three, making only two of 17. The Knights were able to narrow MSU's lead to two on a couple of occasions in the second half, but the Spartans answered each time and pushed the lead to 16 late in the game. AJ Hoggard led all scorers with 16 points and seven assists. Freshman big man Jaxon Kohler stepped up for the Spartans, scoring a career-high 12 points and adding a career-high 11 rebounds. Joey Hauser added 13 points while Tyson Walker scored 12 in the 70–57 win. The win moved MSU to 13–6 and 5–3 in Big Ten play.

==== Indiana ====
MSU next travelled to Bloomington to face Indiana on January 22. Malik Hall did some work before the game, but missed his third straight game. The Spartans, counter to what they had done in their prior two games, started off well taking an early nine-point lead. However, after AJ Hoggard and Jaden Akins were called for their second fouls in the half and were forced to the bench, Indian took the lead. The Hoosiers pushed the lead to five at the half. Trayce Jackson-Davis dominated the Spartans in the game, scoring 31 points with 15 rebounds and five blocks. MSU had no answer and although they kept the game close early in the second half, the Hoosiers eventually cruised to an 82–69 win. Joey Hauser led the Spartans with 22 points while Akins added 15 in the loss. Jaxon Kohler followed up his best game by scoring nine points and adding six rebounds. The loss dropped MSU to 13–7, 5–4 on the season.

==== Iowa ====
After playing six games in 16 days, the Spartans hosted Iowa on January 26. The Spartans started poorly, falling behind 10–0 in the first five minutes. Malik Hall's return to the lineup off the bench energized the Spartans as they were able to recover from the deficit to take a 30–29 halftime lead. The game remained close throughout the second half, but the Hawkeyes' poor three-point shooting (17.6%) cost them. MSU had a chance to put the game away with free throws, but AJ Hoggard missed the front end of a one-and-one. As a result, Iowa, trailing 63–61, had a chance to tie or take the lead with 19 seconds left. However, they missed two shots in the final eight seconds as the Spartans held on for the two-point win. Mady Sissoko notched a double-double in the game, scoring 10 points and grabbing 10 rebounds. Malik Hall scored 11 in his return including a highlight reel dunk in the first half while Jaden Akins led the Spartans with 12 points. The win moved MSU to 14–7, 6–4 on the season.

==== Purdue ====
MSU returned to the road to face No. 1-ranked Purdue on January 29. MSU started well, keeping the game close, but Zach Edey continued his good play against the Spartans as Purdue pulled away to 40–22 lead at half time. The Spartans were able to narrow the lead to around 10 in the second half, but Edey continued his dominance, scoring a career-high 38 points. AJ Hoggard scored 20 to lead the Spartans, but it was not enough as they lost 77–61. Jaden Akins scored 12, but MSU did not have another double-digit scorer in the loss. The loss dropped the Spartans to 14–8 and 6–5 on the season.

==== Rutgers ====
After five days off, the Spartans faced Rutgers at Madison Square Garden on February 4. Both teams struggled offensively in the first half, but the Spartans took a 25–19 lead at the break. In the second half, the Knights recovered to keep the game clos before pulling away with free throws at the end. Paul Mulcahy scored all 17 of his points for Rutgers in the second half to lead the Knights to the 61–55 win. The Spartans struggled to score down the stretch, shooting only 34% from the field in the loss. Tyson Walker led the Spartans with 12 points as MSU lost its fifth game in the prior seven. No other Spartans scored in double figures in the game. The loss moved MSU to 14–9, 6–6 on the season.

==== Maryland ====
MSU welcomed Maryland to Breslin Center on February 7. MSU started well, scoring the first 15 points and jumping out to a 15–0 lead in a little less than four minutes. Maryland was able to narrow the lead, but still trailed by nine at the half. In the second half, the Terrapins continued to narrow the lead while taking the lead for the first time in the game with 12:37 left in the game. MSU, whose offense has struggled in stretches of many games this year, struggled in the second half. However, Joey Hauser broke out of a recent slump, scoring a game-high 20 points while MSU shot 45% from three. The Terrapins struggled from deep, shooting under 14% from three. Tyson Walker added 17 points while AJ Hoggard scored eight, but added 10 rebounds and 10 assists. MSU was able to pull out to a five-point lead behind a three from Hauser. However, Maryland closed to within two with 32 seconds remaining. Hoggard made two late free throws and was able to pass out of a full-court press to find Jaden Akins for a dunk with four seconds remaining to give MSU the 63–58 win. The win moved the Spartans to 15–9 and 7–6 on the season.

==== Ohio State ====
The Spartans next traveled to face Ohio State on Super Bowl Sunday. In a game featuring two less-than-stellar offenses, the game was not pretty early on. With 8:40 left in the first half, the game was tied at nine as both teams struggled to shoot the ball. However, led by Joey Hauser's two three-pointers in the half, the Spartans built a lead of as many as 16 and led by 13 at halftime, 27–14. Ohio State narrowed the lead in the second half, drawing to within five with less than 12 minutes remaining. However, Hauser led the Spartans as they shut the door on the comeback attempt. MSU pushed the lead to as many as 23 late and won 62–41. Hauser led all scorers with 22 points while Tyson Walker added 10 points. The 41 points allowed was the fewest MSU had given up to a Big Ten opponent since 2014. Jaden Akins missed all six of his attempted three-pointers, but grabbed nine rebounds as the Spartans won back-to-back games for the first time since January 10. The Buckeyes shot 28.3% from the field while MSU shot over 45%. The loss was OSU's sixth straight and 11 in their prior 12 games. The win moved MSU to 16–9, 8–6 on the season.

==== Minnesota ====
MSU was scheduled to face Minnesota on February 14 in East Lansing. However, the game was postponed following a mass shooting at the school on February 13. Tom Izzo later announced the game would not be rescheduled due to scheduling difficulties.

==== Michigan ====
The Spartans returned to play after the shooting on campus to face Michigan on February 18 in Ann Arbor. In a show of solidarity with MSU, Michigan held a moment of silence for the shooting victims and the band played the Spartan alma mater before the game. The Spartans started well, taking a lead and leading throughout most of the first half. Despite shooting over 53% from the field in the first half, the Spartans only led by three at halftime. In the second half, the game remained close throughout, but MSU pushed their lead to six with 8:26 left in the game. However, the Wolverines quickly tied it and closed the game on a 12–0 run to win the game 84–72. MSU failed to score in the final 2:31 of the game. Joey Hauser led the Spartans with 20 points while Malik Hall scored 14, 12 of which came in the first half. The loss dropped the Spartans to 16–10, 8–7 on the season.

==== Indiana ====
The Spartans returned home to face Indiana on February 21 in their first home game since the shooting that killed three people on the campus on February 13. Both teams wore "Spartan Strong" warmup shirts and observed a moment of silence before the game. Eight seats were left empty in the student section representing the three students who died and the five others who were injured in the shooting. MSU started the game poorly, falling behind 8–0 and 12–3. However, Tyson Walker, after missing his first four shots, led MSU's comeback as they took the lead and led by six at halftime. Walker, who led all scorers with 23 made five of seven three-pointers. AJ Hoggard added 22 points on seven of nine shooting as MSU led by as many as 15 in the second half. Trayce Jackson-Davis, who torched the Spartans for 31 points and 15 rebounds in the earlier meeting, was held in check early, but kept the game close in the second half by scoring 19 points. However, Jackson-Davis had seven turnovers as MSU gave him a variety of looks with double teams at times and leaving him alone at others. The Spartans made 18 of 19 free throws and hit 47% of their threes as they held on for the 80–65 win. An emotional Izzo after the game said he hoped the team had come through for the MSU community with the win. The win moved MSU to 17–10, 9–7 on the season.

==== Iowa ====
The Spartans took to the road to face Iowa on February 25. Both teams shot the ball extremely well throughout the game, but neither team could take much of a lead and the game was tied at the half. MSU continued to shoot the ball well in the second half pushing the lead to 10 with less than four minutes remaining in the game. With 2:03 left in the game, the Spartans led by 13 behind Tyson Walker's 31 points. Iowa started to foul MSU to extend the game, but trailed 91–78 with 1:34 left in the game. From there, the Hawkeyes made six of nine three pointers including the last four threes of the half to tie the game at 101 with 3.3 seconds left. MSU's desperation heave at the buzzer was short and the game went to overtime. Iowa dominated the overtime to win the game 112–106. MSU made 11 of 15 three pointers and 31 of 36 free throws in the game, but still gave up the late lead to lose. Jaden Akins scored 21, Joey Hauser scored 18, Malik Hall scored 16 while AJ Hoggard added 15 in the loss. After the game, Izzo blamed himself for the Iowa comeback and loss, calling it "piss-poor coaching." The loss dropped MSU to 17–11, 9–8 on the season.

==== Nebraska ====
MSU remained on the road to face Nebraska on February 28. After the heartbreaking loss against Iowa in the prior game, the Spartans started off extremely slow and fell behind by as many as 15 in the first half against the Cornhuskers. The Spartans made only 10 of 36 shots in the first half after missing only 22 in the entire game against Iowa. Despite making only four of 12 three-pointers in the half, MSU trailed only by 12 at the break. In the second half, the Spartans came out on fire, making 12 of 17 three-pointers (16 total three-pointers in the game) to roar back and take the lead by as many as 17. Joey Hauser scored 20 points with six threes while Tyson Walker made three threes and scored 19. Jaden Akins made five threes in the game while notching 17 points. AJ Hoggard notched a career-high 14 assists, the third most assists by an MSU player ever. The 80–67 win moved MSU to 18–11, 10–8 on the season.

==== Ohio State ====
The Spartans played their final regular season game at home on March 4 against Ohio State. MSU continued their good offensive play, scoring 43 points in the first half against the Buckeyes including shooting 56% from the field and making eight of 14 three-pointers in the half. With a 43–34 lead, the Spartans threatened to blow the game open on several different occasions, but OSU kept the game from becoming a rout though they never got closer than three points. AJ Hoggard led all scorers with 23 points and added seven assists. Joey Hauser added 16 points while Tyson Walker scored 15. MSU held on for the 84–78 Senior Day win. MSU finished the game making 12 of 20 three-pointers and shooting 54% from the field. It marked the fourth straight game where the Spartans scored at least 80 points. The win moved MSU to 19–11, 11–8 on the season to finish in fourth place in the Big Ten.

== Postseason ==
=== Big Ten tournament ===
The Big Ten Tournament took place from March 8 through March 12 at United Center in Chicago. MSU finished the season 11–8 in sole possession of fourth place. As a result, they received a double bye.

==== Ohio State ====
After the No. 13 seed Ohio State defeated Iowa on March 9, the No. 4-seeded Spartans faced Ohio State for a third time on March 10. MSU got off to a good start, taking a 7–2 lead early. However, after that, the Spartans' recent streak of hot-shooting ended as the Buckeyes led for the remainder of the game. MSU only made three of 16 three-pointers in the game and shot 38% from the field overall. Joey Hauser scored 15 for MSU while Jaden Akins, AJ Hoggard, and Tyson Walker each scored 10, but the Spartans were knocked out of the tournament with a 68–58 loss. The loss dropped MSU to 19–12 on the season as they waited to see where they would be seeded in the NCAA tournament.

=== NCAA tournament ===
The Spartans received the No. 7 seed in the East region marking the school's 25th straight tournament appearance. The streak is the second longest active streak, third longest ever, and the longest for any coach in NCAA history.

==== USC ====
The Spartans faced USC on March 17 in the first round of the NCAA Tournament. Joey Hauser led the Spartans with 17 points and eight rebounds as MSU led for a majority of the game. The Spartan defense limited the Trojans to 41% from the field while MSU shot 48%. MSU, a good free throw shooting team, missed 10 free throws including some down the stretch. However, they were able to hold on for a 72–62 win. Jaden Akins and Tyson Walker added 12 points for the Spartans in the win. The win moved MSU to the second round of the tournament with a 20–12 record.

==== Marquette ====
MSU next played No. 2-seeded and No. 6-ranked Marquette on March 19. The Spartans started well and took their first lead just over eighty seconds into the game on a layup by AJ Hoggard. MSU would lead for the remainder of the first half against a Marquette team whose starting point guard, Tyler Kolek, had suffered a thumb injury in their first-round game against the 15-seeded Vermont Catamounts two days prior. Kolek, recently named the Big East Player of the Year, was effectively neutralized as MSU would hold him to game totals of 7 points and 5 assists and force Kolek into a career-high 6 turnovers, despite Kolek's season averages of 12.9 ppg, 7.5 apg (third highest amongst Division I players in 2022–23) and 2.5 topg. However, after Carson Cooper's dunk with 6:12 remaining in the first half gave MSU their largest lead of 12 points, the Golden Eagles responded by outscoring MSU 13–6 to close the half as Hoggard, having picked up his second foul with 5:23 remaining, sat on the bench during most of Marquette's run. After Marquette had narrowed MSU's lead to just 3 points with one minute remaining in the half, a Jaden Atkins jumper would cap off the first half scoring, and MSU carried a 33–28 advantage into halftime. In the second half, Marquette continued its comeback and took the lead on several occasions. However, the Spartans, who shot poorly from three in making only two of 16 attempts, was able to hold Marquette under 40% from the field. Down the stretch, Tyson Walker took over, scoring a game high 23 points including a steal and a dunk to put the game away as MSU held on for the 69–60 win. The win moved MSU to the Sweet Sixteen for the first time since 2019. It marked Tom Izzo's 15th Sweet Sixteen (fifth all-time) and marked his 16th win as the lower seed in the NCAA tournament (an all-time record). Joey Hauser added 14 points in the win against his former team (Hauser played his freshman year with Marquette before transferring to MSU) while Hoggard scored 13.

==== Kansas State ====
The Spartans faced Kansas State at Madison Square Garden on March 23. MSU started the game well and both teams shot well from the field as the game remained close throughout the half. KSU was able to pull out to a five-point lead at the half. The Wildcats were able to extend their lead early in the second half to nine points. However, MSU, led by AJ Hoggard's 25 points, tied the game with just under 15 minutes left in the second half. the teams exchanged leads throughout the half as the game remained close. KSU point guard Markquis Nowell set an NCAA tournament record with 19 assists in the game and the Wildcats led by four with 1:07 remaining in the half. A Malik Hall put back drew the game within two with 52 seconds remaining, but Hall missed the free throw after being fouled on the shot. A Nowell missed three-pointer with 28 second left gave the Spartans the ball with a change to tie it. Tyson Walker made a layup with six seconds remaining to tie the game at 82. A missed shot by Nowell as time expired sent the game to overtime. The close game continued in overtime as the team's exchanged leads. With 42 seconds left in the extra period, Hall was fouled with 42 seconds left. After making the first free throw to bring the score to 94–93, Hall missed another free throw. Nowell attempted a long three-pointer that was partially deflected by Hoggard and going out of bounds with 17 seconds left. Nowell then passed the ball Ismael Massoud on the ensuing inbounds play and Massoud's shot put the Wildcats ahead by three with 15 seconds left. After calling a timeout with 12 seconds remaining, the Spartans were unable to get off a shot and Nowell stripped Walker for layup as time expired to seal the 98–93 win. The loss ended the Spartans season at 21–13.

== Roster ==
On August 27, the school announced the roster for the season. Nick Sanders, son of former NFL Hall of Fame running back Barry Sanders, was listed as a walk-on.

2022–23 Michigan State Spartans men's basketball team
Players
Coaches

| Pos. | # | Name | Height | Weight | Year | Previous school | Hometown |
|---|---|---|---|---|---|---|---|
| G | 3 | Jaden Akins | 6 ft 4 in (1.93 m) | 180 lb (82 kg) | So | Sunrise Christian Academy | Farmington, MI |
| G | 1 | Pierre Brooks | 6 ft 6 in (1.98 m) | 225 lb (102 kg) | So | Douglass Academy | Detroit, MI |
| C | 15 | Carson Cooper | 6 ft 11 in (2.11 m) | 210 lb (95 kg) | Fr | IMG Academy | Jackson, MI |
| F | 25 | Malik Hall | 6 ft 8 in (2.03 m) | 225 lb (102 kg) | Sr | Sunrise Christian Academy | Aurora, IL |
| F | 10 | Joey Hauser | 6 ft 9 in (2.06 m) | 230 lb (104 kg) | RS Sr | Marquette; Stevens Point HS | Stevens Point, WI |
| G | 11 | A. J. Hoggard | 6 ft 4 in (1.93 m) | 210 lb (95 kg) | Jr | Huntington Prep | Coatesville, PA |
| G | 5 | Trejuan Holloman | 6 ft 2 in (1.88 m) | 175 lb (79 kg) | Fr | Cretin-Derham Hall High School | St. Paul, MN |
| G | 13 | Steven Izzo (W) | 5 ft 8 in (1.73 m) | 150 lb (68 kg) | Sr | Lansing Catholic | East Lansing, MI |
| F | 0 | Jaxon Kohler | 6 ft 9 in (2.06 m) | 250 lb (113 kg) | Fr | Southern California Academy | America Fork, UT |
| G | 20 | Nick Sanders (W) | 5 ft 9 in (1.75 m) | 170 lb (77 kg) | Fr | Detroit Country Day School | Franklin, MI |
| C | 22 | Mady Sissoko | 6 ft 9 in (2.06 m) | 235 lb (107 kg) | Jr | Wasatch Academy | Bafoulabé, Mali |
| G | 14 | Davis Smith | 6 ft 0 in (1.83 m) | 160 lb (73 kg) | Jr | Westminster | Atlanta, GA |
| G | 2 | Tyson Walker | 6 ft 0 in (1.83 m) | 175 lb (79 kg) | Sr | Northeastern; Christ the King Prep | Westbury, NY |
| G | 43 | Jason Whitens | 6 ft 5 in (1.96 m) | 210 lb (95 kg) | RS Sr | Western Michigan; North Central HS | Powers, MI |

Head coach

- Tom Izzo (Northern Michigan)

Assistant coach(es)

- Mark Montgomery (Michigan State)
- Doug Wojcik (Navy)
- Thomas Kelley (Michigan State)

Legend

- (C) Team captain
- (S) Suspended
- (I) Ineligible
- (W) Walk-on
- Injured
- Current redshirt

Roster

== Schedule and results ==
On February 15, 2022, it was announced that the Spartans would play in the Phil Knight Invitational from November 24 through 27 in honor of Nike founder Phil Knight's 85th birthday. The Spartans also played in the original event, held in 2017. The Spartans once again participated in the Champions Classic. The Spartans also played in the ACC–Big Ten Challenge which turned out to be the final time the event would be held. On June 16, the Big Ten announced the teams Michigan State would play in the conference season. On June 27, it was confirmed that MSU would face Villanova in the Gavitt Tipoff Games. On July 13, MSU and Gonzaga announced that they would play a game on the aircraft carrier USS Abraham Lincoln on November 11 as part of a Veteran's Day celebration. The Spartans previously played on the USS Carl Vinson against North Carolina in 2011. The Spartans' full schedule was announced on September 8.

| Date time, TV | Rank^{#} | Opponent^{#} | Result | Record | High points | High rebounds | High assists | Site (attendance) city, state |
Exhibition
| November 1, 2022*; 7:00 p.m., BTN+ | | Grand Valley State | W 73–56 | | 15 – Hall | 6 – Sissoko | 5 – Hoggard | Breslin Center (14,797); East Lansing, MI |
Regular season
| November 7, 2022*; 7:00 p.m., BTN+ | | Northern Arizona | W 73–55 | 1–0 | 18 – Hauser | 10 – Hauser | 8 – Hoggard | Breslin Center (14,797); East Lansing, MI |
| November 11, 2022*; 6:30 p.m., ESPN | | vs. No. 2 Gonzaga; Armed Forces Classic | L 63–64 | 1–1 | 14 – Sissoko | 9 – Sissoko | 6 – Hoggard | USS Abraham Lincoln (3,572); San Diego, CA |
| November 15, 2022*; 7:00 p.m., ESPN | | vs. No. 4 Kentucky; Champions Classic | W 86–77 ^{2OT} | 2–1 | 23 – Hauser | 8 – Tied | 9 – Hoggard | Gainbridge Fieldhouse (17,923); Indianapolis, IN |
| November 18, 2022*; 8:00 p.m., FS1 | | Villanova; Gavitt Tipoff Games | W 73–71 | 3–1 | 22 – Walker | 8 – Hoggard | 10 – Hoggard | Breslin Center (14,797); East Lansing, MI |
| November 24, 2022*; 10:30 p.m., ESPN | No. 12 | vs. No. 18 Alabama; Phil Knight Invitational Quarterfinals | L 70–81 | 3–2 | 21 – Walker | 9 – Brooks | 4 – Walker | Moda Center (5,598); Portland, OR |
| November 25, 2022*; 11:59 p.m., ESPN2 | No. 12 | vs. Oregon; Phil Knight Invitational consolation | W 74–70 | 4–2 | 18 – Tied | 10 – Hauser | 8 – Walker | Veteran's Memorial Coliseum (3,603); Portland, OR |
| November 27, 2022*; 5:30 p.m., ESPN | No. 12 | at Portland; Phil Knight Invitational 5th place game | W 78–77 | 5–2 | 16 – Walker | 7 – Hauser | 9 – Hoggard | Chiles Center (1,956); Portland, OR |
| November 30, 2022*; 9:15 p.m., ESPN2 | No. 20 | at Notre Dame; ACC–Big Ten Challenge | L 52–70 | 5–3 | 15 – Hoggard | 8 – Sissoko | 3 – Hoggard | Joyce Center (7,854); South Bend, IN |
| December 4, 2022; 7:00 p.m., BTN | No. 20 | Northwestern | L 63–70 | 5–4 (0–1) | 12 – Tied | 8 – Hauser | 8 – Hoggard | Breslin Center (14,797); East Lansing, MI |
| December 7, 2022; 6:30 p.m., BTN | | at Penn State | W 67–58 | 6–4 (1–1) | 23 – Hoggard | 15 – Hauser | 3 – Tied | Bryce Jordan Center (8,302); University Park, PA |
| December 10, 2022*; 4:30 p.m., BTN | | Brown | W 68–50 | 7–4 | 22 – Hauser | 7 – Tied | 6 – Holloman | Breslin Center (14,797); East Lansing, MI |
| December 21, 2022*; 6:30 p.m., BTN | | Oakland | W 67–54 | 8–4 | 16 – Hauser | 12 – Sissoko | 8 – Hoggard | Breslin Center (14,797); East Lansing, MI |
| December 30, 2022*; 6:00 p.m., BTN | | Buffalo | W 89–68 | 9–4 | 14 – Hauser | 12 – Hauser | 10 – Hoggard | Breslin Center (14,797); East Lansing, MI |
| January 3, 2023; 7:00 p.m., BTN | | Nebraska | W 74–56 | 10–4 (2–1) | 21 – Walker | 10 – Tied | 9 – Hoggard | Breslin Center (14,797); East Lansing, MI |
| January 7, 2023; 2:30 p.m., FOX | | Michigan; Rivalry | W 59–53 | 11–4 (3–1) | 15 – Tied | 10 – Hauser | 6 – Hoggard | Breslin Center (14,797); East Lansing, MI |
| January 10, 2023; 7:00 p.m., ESPN | | at No. 18 Wisconsin | W 69–65 | 12–4 (4–1) | 20 – Hauser | 11 – Sissoko | 8 – Hoggard | Kohl Center (14,260); Madison, WI |
| January 13, 2023; 9:00 p.m., FS1 | | at Illinois | L 66–75 | 12–5 (4–2) | 20 – Hoggard | 11 – Hauser | 1 – 4 Tied | State Farm Center (15,544); Champaign, IL |
| January 16, 2023; 2:30 p.m., FOX | | No. 3 Purdue | L 63–64 | 12–6 (4–3) | 30 – Walker | 8 – Sissoko | 8 – Hoggard | Breslin Center (14,797); East Lansing, MI |
| January 19, 2023; 6:30 p.m., FS1 | | No. 23 Rutgers | W 70–57 | 13–6 (5–3) | 16 – Hoggard | 11 – Kohler | 7 – Hoggard | Breslin Center (14,797); East Lansing, MI |
| January 22, 2023; 12:00 p.m., CBS | | at Indiana | L 69–82 | 13–7 (5–4) | 22 – Hauser | 6 – Hauser | 2 – Tied | Simon Skjodt Assembly Hall (17,222); Bloomington, IN |
| January 26, 2023; 7:00 p.m., FS1 | | Iowa | W 63–61 | 14–7 (6–4) | 12 – Akins | 6 – Tied | 5 – Walker | Breslin Center (14,797); East Lansing, MI |
| January 29, 2023; 12:15 p.m., CBS | | at No. 1 Purdue | L 61–77 | 14–8 (6–5) | 20 – Hoggard | 5 – Hauser | 6 – Hoggard | Mackey Arena (14,876); West Lafayette, IN |
| February 4, 2023; 12:00 p.m., FOX | | vs. Rutgers; B1G Super Saturday | L 55–61 | 14–9 (6–6) | 12 – Walker | 13 – Hall | 3 – Hall | Madison Square Garden (14,844); New York, NY |
| February 7, 2023; 9:00 p.m., ESPN2 | | Maryland | W 63–58 | 15–9 (7–6) | 20 – Hauser | 10 – Hoggard | 8 – Hoggard | Breslin Center (14,797); East Lansing, MI |
| February 12, 2023; 1:00 p.m., CBS | | at Ohio State | W 62–41 | 16–9 (8–6) | 22 – Hauser | 9 – Akins | 5 – Hoggard | Value City Arena (19,049); Columbus, OH |
| February 15, 2023; 7:00 p.m., BTN | | Minnesota | Canceled due to shooting at Michigan State | | | | | Breslin Center; East Lansing, MI |
| February 18, 2023; 8:00 p.m., FOX | | at Michigan; Rivalry | L 72–84 | 16–10 (8–7) | 20 – Hauser | 5 – Akins | 7 – Hoggard | Crisler Center (12,707); Ann Arbor, MI |
| February 21, 2023; 9:00 p.m., ESPN | | No. 17 Indiana | W 80–65 | 17–10 (9–7) | 23 – Walker | 8 – Hauser | 5 – Hoggard | Breslin Center (14,797); East Lansing, MI |
| February 25, 2023; 12:00 p.m., ESPN | | at Iowa | L 106–112 ^{OT} | 17–11 (9–8) | 31 – Walker | 6 – Sissoko | 7 – Hoggard | Carver–Hawkeye Arena (15,056); Iowa City, IA |
| February 28, 2023; 9:00 p.m., BTN | | at Nebraska | W 80–67 | 18–11 (10–8) | 20 – Hauser | 7 – Tied | 14 – Hoggard | Pinnacle Bank Arena (15,020); Lincoln, NE |
| March 4, 2023; 12:00 p.m., ESPN | | Ohio State | W 84–78 | 19–11 (11–8) | 23 – Hoggard | 7 – Sissoko | 7 – Hoggard | Breslin Center (14,797); East Lansing, MI |
Big Ten tournament
| March 10, 2023; 2:30 p.m., BTN | (4) | vs. (13) Ohio State; Quarterfinals | L 58–68 | 19–12 | 15 – Hauser | 6 – Hauser | 2 – 4 Tied | United Center (16,738); Chicago, IL |
NCAA Tournament
| March 17, 2023*; 12:15 p.m., CBS | (7 E) | vs. (10 E) USC; First Round | W 72–62 | 20–12 | 17 – Hauser | 8 – Hauser | 5 – Hoggard | Nationwide Arena; Columbus, OH |
| March 19, 2023*; 5:15 p.m., CBS | (7 E) | vs. (2 E) No. 6 Marquette; Second Round | W 69–60 | 21–12 | 23 – Walker | 10 – Tied | 4 – Hoggard | Nationwide Arena; Columbus, OH |
| March 23, 2023*; 6:30 p.m., TBS | (7 E) | vs. (3 E) No. 15 Kansas State; Sweet Sixteen | L 93–98 ^{OT} | 21–13 | 25 – Hoggard | 8 – Hall | 6 – Hoggard | Madison Square Garden (19,624); New York, NY |
*Non-conference game. ^{#}Rankings from AP Poll. (#) Tournament seedings in parentheses. E=East. All times are in Eastern Time.

== Player statistics ==
Individual player statistics (Through March 22, 2023)
| | | | Minutes | | Scoring | | Total FGs | | | 3-point FGs | | | Free-Throws | | | Rebounds | | | | | | | |
| Player | GP | GS | Tot | Avg | Pts | Avg | FG | FGA | Pct | 3FG | 3FA | Pct | FT | FTA | Pct | Off | Def | Tot | Avg | A | Stl | Blk | TO |
|---|---|---|---|---|---|---|---|---|---|---|---|---|---|---|---|---|---|---|---|---|---|---|---|
| Akins, Jaden | 29 | 24 | 786 | 27.1 | 277 | 9.6 | 104 | 252 | .413 | 45 | 111 | .405 | 24 | 34 | .706 | 21 | 94 | 115 | 4.0 | 33 | 35 | 8 | 36 |
| Brooks, Pierre | 30 | 5 | 428 | 14.3 | 108 | 3.6 | 39 | 117 | .333 | 24 | 74 | .324 | 6 | 10 | .600 | 16 | 35 | 51 | 1.7 | 11 | 5 | 0 | 11 |
| Cooper, Carson | 29 | 0 | 158 | 6.4 | 47 | 1.6 | 19 | 26 | .731 | 0 | 0 | | 9 | 19 | .474 | 10 | 15 | 25 | 0.9 | 2 | 4 | 8 | 7 |
| Hall, Malik | 22 | 5 | 560 | 25.5 | 193 | 8.8 | 68 | 157 | .430 | 16 | 47 | .340 | 41 | 47 | .872 | 30 | 62 | 92 | 4.2 | 26 | 12 | 8 | 32 |
| Hauser, Joey | 33 | 33 | 1120 | 33.9 | 472 | 14.3 | 159 | 328 | .485 | 73 | 158 | .462 | 81 | 92 | .880 | 45 | 188 | 233 | 7.1 | 61 | 13 | 7 | 50 |
| Hoggard, AJ | 33 | 32 | 1001 | 30.3 | 12 | 12.5 | 136 | 329 | .413 | 23 | 71 | .324 | 117 | 147 | .796 | 6 | 117 | 123 | 3.7 | 195 | 30 | 9 | 84 |
| Holloman, Tre | 33 | 0 | 287 | 8.7 | 43 | 1.3 | 17 | 44 | .386 | | 13 | .231 | 6 | 10 | .600 | 3 | 24 | 27 | 0.8 | 28 | 5 | 3 | 11 |
| Izzo, Steven | 8 | 0 | 8 | 1.0 | 0 | 0.0 | 0 | 4 | .000 | 0 | 1 | .000 | 0 | 2 | .000 | 1 | 1 | 2 | 0.3 | 0 | 0 | 0 | 0 |
| Kohler, Jaxon | 33 | 0 | 61 | 11.0 | 100 | 3.0 | 49 | 97 | .505 | 0 | 2 | .000 | 2 | 8 | .250 | 35 | 61 | 96 | 2.9 | 10 | 4 | 17 | 21 |
| Sanders, Nick | 7 | 0 | 7 | 1.0 | 0 | 0.0 | 0 | 2 | .000 | 0 | 1 | .000 | 0 | 0 | | 0 | 0 | 0 | 0.0 | 0 | 0 | 0 | 0 |
| Sissoko, Mady | 33 | 32 | 712 | 21.6 | 168 | 5.1 | 61 | 100 | .610 | 0 | 0 | | 46 | 73 | .630 | 58 | 146 | 204 | 6.2 | 18 | 9 | 28 | 42 |
| Smith, Davis | 12 | 0 | 2 | 2.0 | 2 | 0.2 | 1 | 5 | .200 | 0 | 2 | .000 | 0 | 0 | | 1 | 1 | 2 | 0.2 | 0 | 0 | 0 | 1 |
| Walker, Tyson | 33 | 33 | 1113 | 33.7 | 488 | 14.8 | 191 | 413 | .462 | 55 | 135 | .407 | 51 | 64 | .797 | 8 | 75 | 83 | 2.5 | 93 | 38 | 8 | 40 |
| Whitens, Jason | 19 | 1 | 79 | 4.2 | 8 | 0.4 | 4 | 6 | .667 | 0 | 2 | .000 | 0 | 0 | | 4 | 6 | 10 | 0.5 | 2 | 3 | 0 | 2 |
| Total | 33 | | 6675 | | 2318 | 70.2 | 848 | 1881 | .451 | 239 | 617 | .387 | 383 | 506 | .757 | 294 | 882 | 1176 | 35.6 | 479 | 158 | 96 | 357 |
| Opponents | 33 | | 6675 | | 2211 | 67.0 | 796 | 1900 | .419 | 234 | 733 | .319 | 385 | 534 | .721 | 297 | 782 | 1079 | 32.7 | 421 | 183 | 114 | 328 |

Legend
| GP | Games played | GS | Games started | Avg | Average per game |
| FG | Field-goals made | FGA | Field-goal attempts | Off | Offensive rebounds |
| Def | Defensive rebounds | A | Assists | TO | Turnovers |
| Blk | Blocks | Stl |

== Rankings ==
Ranking movements Legend: ██ Increase in ranking ██ Decrease in ranking — = Not ranked RV = Received votes
| | Week | | | | | | | | | | | | | | | | | | | |
| Poll | Pre | 1 | 2 | 3 | 4 | 5 | 6 | 7 | 8 | 9 | 10 | 11 | 12 | 13 | 14 | 15 | 16 | 17 | 18 | Final |
|---|---|---|---|---|---|---|---|---|---|---|---|---|---|---|---|---|---|---|---|---|
| AP | RV | RV | 12 | 20 | RV | RV | RV | RV | RV | RV | RV | RV | — | — | — | — | — | RV | — | Not released |
| Coaches | RV | 25 | 15 | 20 | RV | RV | RV | RV | RV | RV | RV | RV | RV | — | — | — | — | RV | RV | 20 |

*AP does not release post-NCAA Tournament rankings.

== Awards and honors ==
=== Postseason awards ===
==== Joey Hauser ====
- All-Big Ten Honorable Mention (coaches and media)

==== A.J. Hoggard ====
- All-Big Ten Third Team (media)
- All-Big Ten Honorable Mention (coaches)

==== Tyson Walker ====
- All-Big Ten Second Team (coaches and media)
