= Johnny Nugent =

American politician

Member of the Indiana Senate from the 43rd district
- In office 1978–2014
- Preceded by: Robert J. Bischoff
- Succeeded by: Chip Perfect

Personal details
- Born: July 18, 1939 (age 87) Cleves, Ohio, U.S.
- Party: Republican
- Spouse: Nancy
- Occupation: Politician

Johnny Nugent (born July 18, 1939) is a Republican member of the Indiana Senate, representing the 43rd District from 1978 to 2014. He was born in Cleves, Ohio and graduated from high school in 1957. Nugent has owned Nugent Tractor Sales since 1968. He served on the Dearborn County Board of Commissioners from 1966 to 1974.

In 2002, he was arrested for driving under the influence, with a blood alcohol content of 0.13%.

In 2009, he introduced legislation that would have prohibited Indiana schools from banning firearms.
