= Randy Maxwell =

American politician

Member of the Indiana Senate from the 43rd district
- Incumbent
- Assumed office September 28, 2023
- Preceded by: Chip Perfect

Personal details
- Born: Logan, Indiana, U.S.
- Party: Republican
- Education: Indiana University
- Football career

Profile
- Position: Tight end

Career information
- College: Indiana (1995–1997)

Randy Maxwell is an American politician serving as a member of the Indiana Senate from the 43rd district. He assumed office on September 28, 2023.

== Academic and Athletic Journey ==
Maxwell gained recognition for his outstanding performance on the football field during his time at East Central High School. Following his success in high school, he seamlessly transitioned to the collegiate level, where he demonstrated his prowess as a tight end for the Indiana University team. Maxwell earned degrees in finance and entrepreneurship.

== Career ==
Indiana Governor Mitch Daniels appointed Maxwell to the Indiana Unemployment Insurance Board in 2007. In September 2023 Maxwell won the Republican caucus held to appoint a new state senator for the 43rd district, garnering 56 of the 80 votes available. His predecessor Chip Perfect endorsed him.

== Personal life ==
Maxwell grew up in Logan, Indiana and married his high school sweetheart, Robin. They have three children, Alex, Kyla, and Dylan. Alex played football for the Purdue Boilermakers.
