= David Orentlicher =

American politician

Member of the Nevada Assembly from the 20th district
- Incumbent
- Assumed office November 4, 2020
- Preceded by: Ellen Spiegel

Member of the Indiana House of Representatives from the 86th district
- In office November 6, 2002 – November 5, 2008
- Preceded by: Jim Atterholt
- Succeeded by: Ed DeLaney

Personal details
- Born: Washington, D.C., U.S.
- Party: Democratic
- Spouse: Judy
- Education: Brandeis University (BA); Harvard University (MD, JD)
- Occupation: Physician, attorney, educator

David Orentlicher is an educator, physician, attorney, and an American elected official. He is a member of the Democratic Party and is the Judge Jack and Lulu Lehman Professor at UNLV William S. Boyd School of Law and director of the UNLV Health Law Program. He teaches courses in health care law and constitutional law. Orentlicher also has held visiting or adjunct teaching positions at Princeton University, the University of Chicago Law School, Indiana University: Robert H. McKinney School of Law, University of Iowa College of Law, and Northwestern University Medical School.

== Life and career ==
Orentlicher graduated from Harvard Medical School and then completed an internship in internal medicine. After practicing as a family physician, he returned to Harvard Law School for his Juris Doctor. After clerking on the U.S. Court of Appeals for the Fifth Circuit, he practiced law for two years before joining the American Medical Association, where he served as Ethics and Health Policy Counsel and directed the AMA's division of medical ethics. While there, he drafted the AMA's first ever Patients' Bill of Rights, guidelines for physician investment in health care facilities that were incorporated into federal law, and guidelines on gifts to physicians from industry that have become the industry standard and a standard recognized by the federal government. He helped develop many other positions—on end-of-life matters, organ transplantation, and reproductive issues—that have been cited by courts and government agencies in their decision-making. He is a member of the American Law Institute, a Uniform Law Commissioner from Nevada, and a fellow of the Hastings Center, an independent bioethics research institution.

== Legislative work ==
In June 2020, Orentlicher won his primary for the Nevada Assembly in District 20 and had no opposition for the seat in November 2020. He has also won reelection in 2022 and 2024. District 20 lies on the southeast side of Las Vegas. Orentlicher also served in the Indiana House from 2002 to 2008. He represented the 86th House District, which consisted of a northern portion of Indianapolis in Marion County and a small portion of Carmel in Hamilton County.

=== Committee membership ===
Assemblyman Orentlicher serves on the three committees—Health and Human Services, Judiciary, and Education. Previously he served on the Committee on Revenue. In Indiana, he served as Committee Chair for the Small Business & Economic Development Committee and as a member of the following committees during his six years: Ways and Means, Public Health, Education, Insurance, and Technology, Research, & Development.

== Family ==
A resident of Las Vegas, Orentlicher and his wife Judith L. Failer have two children, Cy and Shay. He is Jewish.

Indiana House of Representatives
| Preceded by Jim Atterholt | Member of the Indiana House of Representatives from the 86th district 2002–2008 | Succeeded by Edward DeLaney |
Nevada Assembly
| Preceded by Ellen Spiegel | Member of the Nevada Assembly from the 20th district 2020–present | Incumbent |
