= Jim Tomes =

American politician

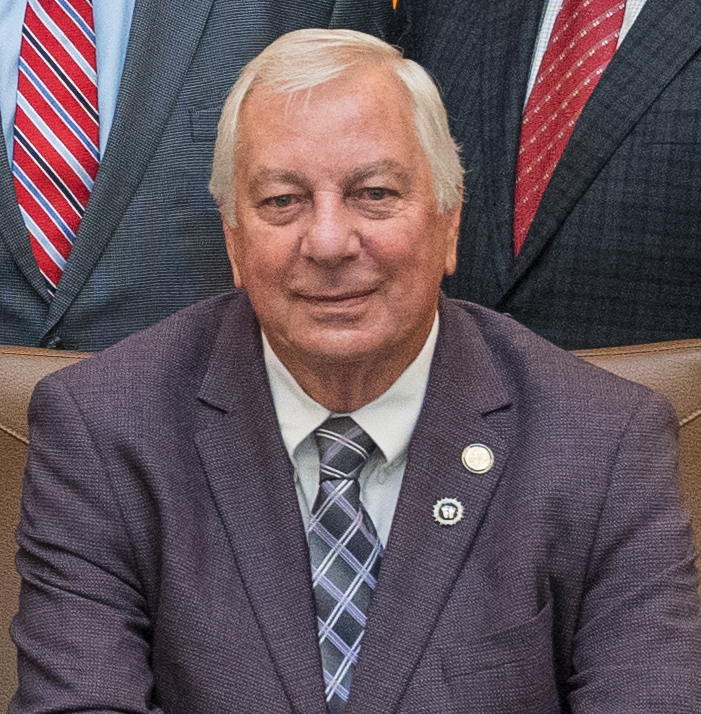

Member of the Indiana Senate from the 49th district
- Incumbent
- Assumed office November 3, 2010
- Preceded by: Bob Deig

Personal details
- Born: July 31, 1948 (age 77) Evansville, Indiana, U.S.
- Party: Republican
- Spouse: Margie
- Education: Ivy Tech Community College

Jim Tomes (born July 31, 1948) is a Republican member of the Indiana Senate, representing the Senate District 49 since 2010. He is a founder of the gun rights organization 2nd Amendment Patriots and has served as its director since its inception in January 1999. He has received support from the Tea Party and is a proponent for conservative causes including smaller government and opposition to reproductive freedom. For 33 years, he was a trucker and served as a union steward.

Tomes broke ranks with Republican leadership in the State Senate and the administration of Republican Governor Mitch Daniels to oppose the "right-to-work" legislation that became law in Indiana in 2012. His legislative history shows that he is sympathetic to the anti-vaccine movement. He voted against legislation for collegiate meningitis vaccine requirements. Tomes also introduced a bill in 2018 that would require schools to inform parents about vaccine exemptions which are allowed by law. He voted against a bill in 2019 that would require assisted living facilities to inform residents about the seasonal influenza vaccine.
