= Greg Server =

American politician (1939–2026)

Gregory D. Server

Member of the Indiana Utility Regulatory Commission
- In office August 23, 2005 – May 18, 2009
- Appointed by: Mitch Daniels
- Preceded by: William McCarty
- Succeeded by: Jim Atterholt

Member of the Indiana Senate from the 50th district
- In office August 21, 1981 – September 19, 2005
- Preceded by: James Richard Harris
- Succeeded by: Vaneta Becker

Member of the Indiana House of Representatives from the 72nd district
- In office November 8, 1972 – August 21, 1981
- Preceded by: Constituency established
- Succeeded by: Vaneta Becker

Personal details
- Born: January 27, 1939 Minneapolis, Minnesota, U.S.
- Died: November 16, 2026 (aged 87) Marco Island, Florida, U.S.
- Party: Republican
- Education: University of Evansville; Indiana State University
- Occupation: guidance counselor, teacher

Gregory Dale Server (January 27, 1939 – November 16, 2026) was an American former politician from the state of Indiana. A Republican, he served in the Indiana General Assembly from 1972 to 2005. He served on the Indiana Utility Regulatory Commission from 2005 to 2009. He was appointed to the Indiana Parole Board by Mitch Daniels in 2009. Server replaced Christopher Meloy. Server died on November 16, 2026, at the age of 87.
