= Jud McMillin =

American politician

Judson McMillin

Member of the Indiana House of Representatives from the 68th district
- In office November 16, 2010 – September 29, 2015
- Preceded by: Bob Bischoff
- Succeeded by: Randy Lyness

Personal details
- Born: March 8, 1977 (age 49) Cincinnati, Ohio
- Party: Republican
- Education: University of Cincinnati, University of Mississippi
- Occupation: Lawyer

Judson "Jud" McMillin (born March 8, 1977) is an American Republican legislator who served as a member of the Indiana House of Representatives, representing the 68th District from being elected in 2010 until his resignation on September 29, 2015. He defeated incumbent Bob Bischoff, who had held the position for over 30 years, by a 54 to 46 percent margin. During his freshman session he was appointed Vice Chair on the House Judiciary Committee and he served on the Court and Criminal Code Committee and Roads and Transportation Committee. In the 2010 session he authored and co-authored 4 bills that were passed down: House Bill 1205, House Bill 1558, House Bill 1559, and House Bill 1561.

McMillin was elected to his third term in 2014 and assumed the position of Majority Floor Leader at the beginning of the 2015 legislative session, making him the second highest ranking Republican in the Indiana House.

== Personal life ==
Jud McMillin was born at Good Samaritan Hospital in Cincinnati. He spent his early years near the Franklin County/Dearborn County line. He attended Franklin County High school where he excelled in both academics and athletics; he played football and baseball. McMillin then went on to go to college at the University of Cincinnati where he earned a bachelor's degree in Economics. While there, McMillin played on the baseball team and was named a captain of his team during his junior and senior years. After graduating from the University of Cincinnati, McMillin attended the University of Mississippi where he earned his Juris Doctor degree. After graduation, he was a deputy prosecutor in Dayton, Ohio.

McMillin resigned as a prosecutor after he became involved in a relationship with the complaining witness on in a domestic violence case on which he was the assigned prosecutor. The woman later filed a lawsuit against him for legal malpractice, intentional infliction of emotional distress, and breach of fiduciary duty, but the lawsuit was withdrawn, and the Ohio Bar Association did not find an ethical violation by McMillin. McMillin's status as an attorney is listed as "inactive" on the website of the Supreme Court of Ohio.

== 2008 and 2010 campaigns ==
In 2008, McMillin was approached by the Republican Party to run for state representative against then incumbent Bob Bischoff. That year he came within 500 votes of Bischof, and was asked to run again during the next election cycle. This time, helped by a national conservative groundswell, and a share of the more than $1 million fed into conservative campaigns by Governor Mitch Daniels Aiming Higher PAC, McMillin defeated Bob Bischoff (a 30-year incumbent), receiving 54 percent of the vote to Bischoff's 46 percent. A breakdown of the election results will reveal that McMillin won every county in his district including Franklin, Ohio, Ripley, and Switzerland Counties. He also defeated Bischoff in his own Dearborn County.

== Legislative accomplishments ==
McMillin had four bills, which he authored and co-authored, handed down during the 2011 session. The first bill (HB 1205) prohibits the state government from funding establishments providing abortions; the bill excludes hospitals. The second bill (HB 1561) requires that all people receiving unemployment benefits submit at least one job application a week. The bill also states that persons who have received benefits for four weeks, will be required to perform community service if needed by the Department of Workforce. The third bill (HB 1559) mandates that recipients of Temporary Assistance for Needy Families (TANF) be required to submit to random drug testing. If a recipient tests positive, the bill then stipulates that the person complete a drug abuse treatment program and wait six months before reapplying for assistance; the bill calls for similar measures to be taken by the Dept. of Workforce Development for recipients of unemployment insurance. The fourth bill (HB 1558) bars unauthorized adoption facilitation and calls for a removal of language that makes it a Class A misdemeanor for a person to of their own volition provide, take part in, or facilitate adoption services to a prospective adoptive parent.

== Resignation ==
In October 2015, McMillin claimed his cell phone had been stolen in Canada and inappropriate messages may have sent. A week later a sexually explicit video sent from his phone reached the Indianapolis Star newspaper. McMillin abruptly resigned in order to spend more time with his family.
