= Purdue University Northwest =

Public university in Hammond and Westville, Indiana, U.S.

- Former names: Purdue University Calumet (1946–2016); Purdue University North Central (1946–2016)
- Type: Public regional master's university
- Established: 2016
- Parent institution: Purdue University system
- Accreditation: HLC
- Academic affiliations: Space-grant
- Chancellor: Kenneth C. Holford
- Students: 9,051 (Fall 2024)
- Undergraduates: 8,201 (Fall 2024)
- Postgraduates: 850 (Fall 2024)
- Location: Hammond and Westville, Indiana, United States
- Colors: Campus Gold and Black
- Nickname: Pride
- Sporting affiliations: NCAA Division II – Great Lakes Intercollegiate Athletic Conference
- Mascot: Lion (named Leo)
- Website: pnw.edu
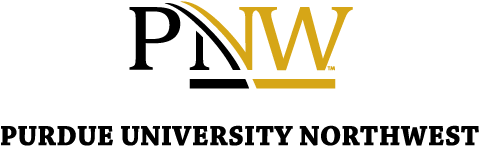

Hammond Campus
- Established: 1946
- Location: Hammond, Indiana, United States; 41°34′54″N 87°28′17″W
- Campus: Urban: 194 acres (78.5 ha)

Westville Campus
- Established: 1946
- Location: Westville, Indiana, United States; 41°35′03″N 86°53′39″W
- Campus: Rural: 305 acres (123.4 ha)

Purdue University Northwest (PNW) is a public university with two campuses in Northwest Indiana; its main campus is in Hammond with a branch campus in Westville. It is part of the Purdue University system and offers more than 70 undergraduate and graduate degree programs to approximately 6,200 students with more than 64,000 alumni.

== History ==
Purdue Northwest was established in 2016 when two Purdue system universities — Purdue University Calumet and Purdue University North Central — merged. During World War II, each campus offered technical courses as part of the national defense training program with the federal government. The campuses remained open when the war ended in 1945, offering for-credit college courses. Both campuses became degree-offering institutions in 1946.

=== Racist remarks controversy ===
At Purdue Northwest's December 2022 commencement, then-chancellor Thomas Keon used made-up words to mock Asian languages, which drew backlash for the racist display and Keon subsequently issued a public apology. The school's Faculty Senate Executive Committee promptly came to a unanimous decision and delivered a letter to Keon demanding his resignation, noting that his statements insulted the Asian American community and caused national outrage.

Congresswoman Grace Meng from New York released a statement condemning the "racist, insensitive, and offensive imitation" made by the chancellor. The Purdue Northwest chapter of the American Association of University Professors also released a statement that criticized Keon's all-white senior leadership team and said the "time has come for Chancellor Keon to resign."

Subsequently, University of Minnesota professor Rich Lee and other Asian American professors started a petition calling for Keon's resignation and received over 1,100 signatures from faculty, staff, and students across the country. The petition was sent to Purdue University's board of trustees, Purdue University president Mitch Daniels, incoming president Mung Chiang, and Keon himself. The Japanese American Citizens League also released a statement calling for the removal of Keon for the remarks.

In April 2023, the school initially announced that Keon would serve out the rest of his term until June 2024, despite calls for his resignation. Keon was ultimately replaced when, in December 2023, the Purdue Board of Trustees accepted university president Mung Chiang's recommendation to appoint Dr. Kenneth (Chris) Holford as the next chancellor, effective January 8, 2024.

== Campuses ==
=== Hammond ===
The Hammond campus is a residential campus covering 167 acres (67.6 ha). It is PNW's main campus and is located 25 miles (40.2 km) from downtown Chicago. The neighborhood campus includes 17 academic and recreational buildings, a fitness center, two apartment-style student housing facilities, the White Lodging Center for Hospitality and Tourism Management, and a Challenger Learning Center. Nearby PNW Hammond facilities include the Commercialization and Manufacturing Excellence Center, the Couple and Family Therapy Center, and Dowling Park, the home of Purdue Northwest baseball, softball, soccer and tennis. The $35 million Nils K. Nelson Bioscience Innovation Building opened in August 2020, housing state-of-the art instructional and research facilities for nursing, biological sciences and STEM education.

Buildings on the Hammond campus include:

- Gyte Science Building – In 1951, the Gyte Science Building originally called the Center Building, was the first building on the Hammond campus. GYTE was named after Millard Gyte, the first director of the Hammond Calumet facility.
- E.D Anderson Building – In 1969, the E.D. Anderson Building was named after the Hammond Chamber of Commerce chairman that offered Purdue the site to build and develop the Calumet campus. ANDR is a three-story, brick structure that contains laboratories, workshops, and faculty offices.
- Andrey A. Potter Laboratory Building – In the 1970, the Andrey A. Potter laboratory Building was built and named after a long-term Purdue West Lafayette dean of engineering and advocate of technical education. This structure is 30,000 square feet.
- Student-Faculty Library Center – This 155,000 square foot structure is also known as the Student Union and Library building. This building was opened in 1971 and contains the library, a student center, bookstore, offices, and classrooms.
- Lawshe Hall – In 1973, Lawshe Hall was completed to hold the campus’ administration and enrollment management center. LAWS is a 54,000 square foot structure.
- Porter Hall – The School City of Hammond of the former Porter Elementary School purchased what is known as Porter Hall in 1980. At first, Porter Hall contained departments and offices. However, in 1991 renovations took place and now accommodates communication and behavioral science programs.
- Donald S. Powers Computer Education Building – In 1989, the Donald S. Powers Computer education Building was built and committed to technological education in Northwest Indiana.
- Classroom Office Building – In 1996, Purdue Calumet celebrated its 50th anniversary. Since the campus was continually growing, there was a need for more classrooms and offices. In 1998, the Classroom Office Building was built.
- Indianapolis Boulevard Counseling Center – Opened in 2018, the "IBCC" houses the Couple & Family Therapy Center and the Community Counseling Center. Both are training facilities that serve the greater Northwest Indiana region with affordable quality mental health services.

=== Westville ===
The Westville branch campus is located on 268 acres (108.5 ha) in rural La Porte County along U.S. Highway 421. This location has three academic buildings, a spacious student services and activity center opened in 2015, and a veterinary emergency facility. The grounds of the Westville campus feature an extensive outdoor and indoor art collection, Shakespeare's Garden adjacent to a picturesque pond, tennis courts, an eighteen-hole disc golf course, a baseball diamond, and four outdoor basketball courts.

Buildings on the campus include:

- The 70,000 square-foot Technology building was completed in 1995 and is currently the main classroom building on PNW's Westville Branch Campus.
- Schwarz Hall – In 1967, the first building on the current location was created. Schwarz Hall, previously named the Education building, is 90,000 square feet. In 1968, the east side of the building received an addition and a year later, it was ready for occupancy. In 1984, the building received its current name in honor of Robert F. Schwarz. Schwarz was the first dean of director.
- Library-Student Faculty Building – In 1969, the need for a second building on campus was started. March 1975 completed the 100,000 square foot Library-Student-Faculty Building (LSF) was opened.
- North Central Veterinary Emergency Center – In May 2002, the North Central Veterinary Emergency Center (NCVEC) opened. This center is a 24-hour emergency veterinary clinic that tends to dogs, cats, and small animals within 50 miles.
- The James B. Dworkin Student Services and Activities Complex – October 16, 2014 saw the opening of the James B. Dworkin Student Services and Activities Complex, named in honor of former Chancellor James B. Dworkin. The facility boasts a full-sized gymnasium, fitness facility with indoor running track and spacious conference center. In 2018, the complex hosted the Indiana U.S. Senate debate.

=== Gabis Arboretum at Purdue Northwest ===
Gabis Arboretum at Purdue Northwest is a 300-acre, oak preserve of formal gardens, woodlands, wetlands, prairies and hiking trails located near Valparaiso, Indiana. Open year-round, the Arboretum offers a wide variety of events and classes for all ages. Officially becoming part of Purdue University Northwest in 2018, Gabis Arboretum at Purdue Northwest provides an enriching, natural habitat for public, educational, conservation and recreational use. Located approximately 25 miles from the Indiana Dunes National Lakeshore and 60 miles southeast of Chicago in Valparaiso, Indiana, Gabis Arboretum has a number of hiking trails to access its diverse landscape.

== Academics ==
Purdue University Northwest offers undergraduate and graduate programs in more than 70 areas of study, plus a doctor of nursing practice degree. Purdue Northwest has been recognized among the best regional universities in the U.S. News & World Report Best Colleges rankings (2018).

The university is organized into six colleges and three schools. They include:

- College of Business (AACSB-accredited)
  - White Lodging School of Hospitality & Tourism Management (ACPHA-accredited)
- College of Engineering and Sciences
  - School of Engineering (ABET-accredited)
- College of Humanities, Education and Social Sciences
  - School of Education & Counseling
- College of Nursing
- College of Technology
- Honors College

== Athletics ==
The Purdue Northwest (PNW) athletic teams are called the Pride. The university is a member of the Division II level of the National Collegiate Athletic Association (NCAA), primarily competing in the Great Lakes Intercollegiate Athletic Conference (GLIAC) as a provisional member since the 2017–18 academic year (achieving D-II full member status in 2019–20). The Pride previously competed in the Chicagoland Collegiate Athletic Conference (CCAC) of the National Association of Intercollegiate Athletics (NAIA) only during the 2016–17 school year.

PNW competes in 11 intercollegiate varsity sports and two non-varsity sports: Men's sports include baseball, basketball, cross country, golf, soccer and tennis; while women's sports include basketball, cross country, golf, soccer, softball, tennis and volleyball; and the non-varsity sports include men's ice hockey and men's volleyball and co-ed pickleball.

== Notable alumni ==
- Felicia Middlebrooks, radio news broadcaster
- David Ober, politician
- Chad Patrick, professional baseball player

== See also ==
- Purdue University System
