= Bob Deig =

American politician (born 1961)

Commissioner of Indiana Utility Regulatory Commission
- Incumbent
- Assumed office January 12, 2026
- Governor: Mike Braun

Member of the Indiana Senate from the 49th district
- In office November 8, 2006 – November 3, 2010
- Preceded by: Larry Lutz
- Succeeded by: Jim Tomes

Personal details
- Born: January 4, 1961 (age 65) Evansville, Indiana, U.S.
- Party: Democratic
- Spouse: Dee Deig
- Children: 3
- Education: Mater Dei High School
- Profession: Politician

Bob Deig (born January 4, 1961) is an American politician who served in the Indiana Senate from 2006 to 2010, representing the 49th legislative district of Indiana as a Democrat.

== Early life and education ==
Deig was born in Evansville, Indiana on January 4, 1961. He obtained a diploma from Mater Dei High School in 1979.

== Career ==
Deig served in the Indiana Senate from 2006 to 2010, representing the 49th legislative district of Indiana as a Democrat. During his time in office, Deig served on the following committees.

- Agriculture and Small Business
- Commerce, Public Policy & Interstate Cooperation
- Pensions and Labor
- Utilities & Technology

Deig's time in office began on November 8, 2006, and concluded on November 3, 2010. He was succeeded by Republican Jim Tomes.

Outside of the Indiana General Assembly, Deig has served on the Posey County Council. He also served as Posey County Commissioner from 2000 to 2003.

== Elections ==
Deig was first elected to the Indiana Senate in 2006, defeating Republican opponent George Postletheweight in the general election.

In 2010, Deig instead ran for election to the Indiana House of Representatives. He ran unopposed in the primary, though narrowly lost to Republican candidate Wendy McNamara in the general election. McNamara defeated Deig by a margin of four votes, with over 18,000 votes being cast in the race.

== Political positions ==
Deig received a 0% rating from Planned Parenthood Advocates of Indiana in 2009. He received an A− rating from the NRA Political Victory Fund in 2010.

== Personal life ==
Deig is married and has three children. He resides in Mount Vernon, Indiana.

Deig is a Catholic.

== Electoral history ==
=== 2006 ===
2006 Indiana Senate District 49 general election
Party	Candidate	Votes	%
Democratic	Bob Deig	20,249	62.42
Republican	George Postletheweight	12,192	37.58
Total votes		32,441	100.0
Democratic hold			

=== 2010 ===
2010 Indiana House of Representatives District 76 general election
Party	Candidate	Votes	%
Republican	Wendy McNamara	9,373	50.01
Democratic	Bob Deig	9,369	49.99
Total votes		18,742	100.0
Republican gain from Democratic			

Democratic primary results
Party	Candidate	Votes	%
Democratic	Bob Deig	5,074	100.0
Total votes		5,074	100.0

Indiana Senate
Preceded by Larry Lutz	Member of the Indiana Senate from the 49th district 2006–2010	Succeeded by Jim Tomes
