= Vaneta Becker =

American politician (born 1949)

Member of the Indiana Senate from the 50th district
- Incumbent
- Assumed office September 26, 2005
- Preceded by: Greg Server

Member of the Indiana House of Representatives from the 78th district
- In office November 4, 1992 – September 26, 2005
- Preceded by: Constituency established
- Succeeded by: Suzanne Crouch

Member of the Indiana House of Representatives from the 75th district
- In office November 3, 1982 – November 4, 1992
- Preceded by: Constituency established
- Succeeded by: Dennis Avery

Member of the Indiana House of Representatives from the 72nd district
- In office September 22, 1981 – November 3, 1982
- Preceded by: Greg Server
- Succeeded by: William Cochran

Personal details
- Born: October 9, 1949 (age 76) Alton, Illinois
- Party: Republican
- Education: University of Southern Indiana

Vaneta Becker (October 9, 1949) is an American politician who serves as a Republican Senator in the Indiana Senate representing Senate District 50, which contains portions of eastern Vanderburgh County and Warrick County in the southwestern part of the state. She sits on the Health and Provider Services Committee and chairs its Public Health Subcommittee having moved on from the Chairmanship of the Provider Services Subcommittee. She is the ranking member of the standing committee on Commerce, Public Policy and Interstate Cooperation.

== Personal life ==
Becker graduated from North High School in Evansville and received her Bachelor of Science degree at the University of Southern Indiana. She has been a real estate broker in Southwestern Indiana since 1975. Her husband, Andy Guarino, was a principal with Evansville-Vanderburgh School Corporation. He retired in 2013.

== Career ==
Becker was first elected to the Indiana House of Representatives in 1981 and served until 2005. She replaced Greg Server who was elevated to the Indiana Senate. She sits on numerous Interim Study Committees: the Evansville State Hospital Advisory Committee, Indiana Commission on Excellence in Health Care, Health and Child Care Issues Evaluation Committee, Health Finance Commission, Indiana Commission for Women, and the Prescription Drug Advisory Committee.

In an otherwise procedural Organization Day resolution, Becker voted in favour of reconvening the Indiana Senate's 2026 session in January 2026. However, as part of broader national mid-decade redistricting efforts, the General Assembly had planned to meet in December 2025 to allow for the redrawing of Indiana's congressional district boundaries, leading The Indianapolis Star to describe the resolution as a "proxy vote for redistricting". Becker said to CNN that she would not change her vote, stating that the majority of calls her office received had opposed redistricting, and that legislators should not "kowtow" to threats of primary challenges.

== Proposed national anthem legislation ==
In December 2011, Becker made headlines when she proposed legislation that set standards for the performance of the national anthem, including a fine of $25 to be levied against any individual that makes deliberate changes to the song.
