= Bob Bischoff =

American politician

Member of the Indiana House of Representatives from the 68th district
- In office November 3, 1982 – November 3, 2010
- Preceded by: William Cochran
- Succeeded by: Jud McMillin

Member of the Indiana House of Representatives from the 57th district
- In office November 5, 1980 – November 3, 1982
- Preceded by: Gary Lee Butler
- Succeeded by: Stephen Charles Moberly

Member of the Indiana Senate from the 43rd district
- In office July 8, 1977 – November 8, 1978
- Preceded by: Wilfrid John Ullrich
- Succeeded by: Johnny Nugent

Personal details
- Born: August 2, 1941 (age 84) Batesville, Indiana
- Party: Democratic
- Spouse: Ardis
- Occupation: retired plant fireman

Robert J. "Bob" Bischoff is an American Democratic legislator who served as a member of the Indiana House of Representatives, representing the 68th District from 1980 until 2010. Earlier he was a member of the Indiana Senate from 1977 through 1978.
