= Ronald Bacon =

American respiratory therapist and politician from Indiana

Ron Bacon

Member of the Indiana House of Representatives from the 75th district
- In office November 16, 2010 – November 4, 2020
- Preceded by: Dennis Avery
- Succeeded by: Cindy Ledbetter

Personal details
- Born: November 18, 1946 (age 79) Evansville, Indiana, U.S.
- Party: Republican
- Spouse: Karen
- Children: 2

Ronald Bacon (born November 18, 1946) is an American respiratory therapist who served as a Republican member of the Indiana House of Representatives. He was first elected in 2010. Bacon previously served on the Warrick County Council and as Warwick County coroner.
