= Jim Atterholt =

American politician (born 1962)

James D. Atterholt

Member of the Indiana Utility Regulatory Commission
- In office February 9, 2017 – January 12, 2018
- Governor: Eric Holcomb
- Preceded by: Carol Stephan
- Succeeded by: David Ober
- In office June 2009 – May 2014
- Governor: Mitch Daniels; Mike Pence
- Preceded by: Greg Server
- Succeeded by: James Huston

Member of the Indiana House of Representatives from the 86th district
- In office July 21, 1998 – November 19, 2002
- Preceded by: John S. Keeler
- Succeeded by: David Orentlicher

Personal details
- Born: May 14, 1962 (age 64) Fort Wayne, Indiana, U.S.
- Party: Republican
- Spouse: Brenda
- Children: 3
- Education: University of Wisconsin, Madison (BA in history and political science)

James D. Atterholt (born May 14, 1962) is a Republican from Indiana. He previously served in the Indiana House of Representatives from 1998 until 2002 for the 86th district. He lost reelection to David Orentlicher in 2002.

Atterholt was served as Insurance Commissioner of Indiana from 2005 until his appointment to the Indiana Utility Regulatory Commission in 2009 by Governor Mitch Daniels. In 2014, Governor Mike Pence named Atterholt as his chief of staff. In 2017, Governor Eric Holcomb appointed him to the Indiana Utility Regulatory Commission once again. He stepped down from the Commission in 2018.

He previously served as Vice Mayor of Fort Myers Beach, Florida. He stepped down from the Town Council and as Vice Mayor at the end of 2025.
