= David Ober =

American politician

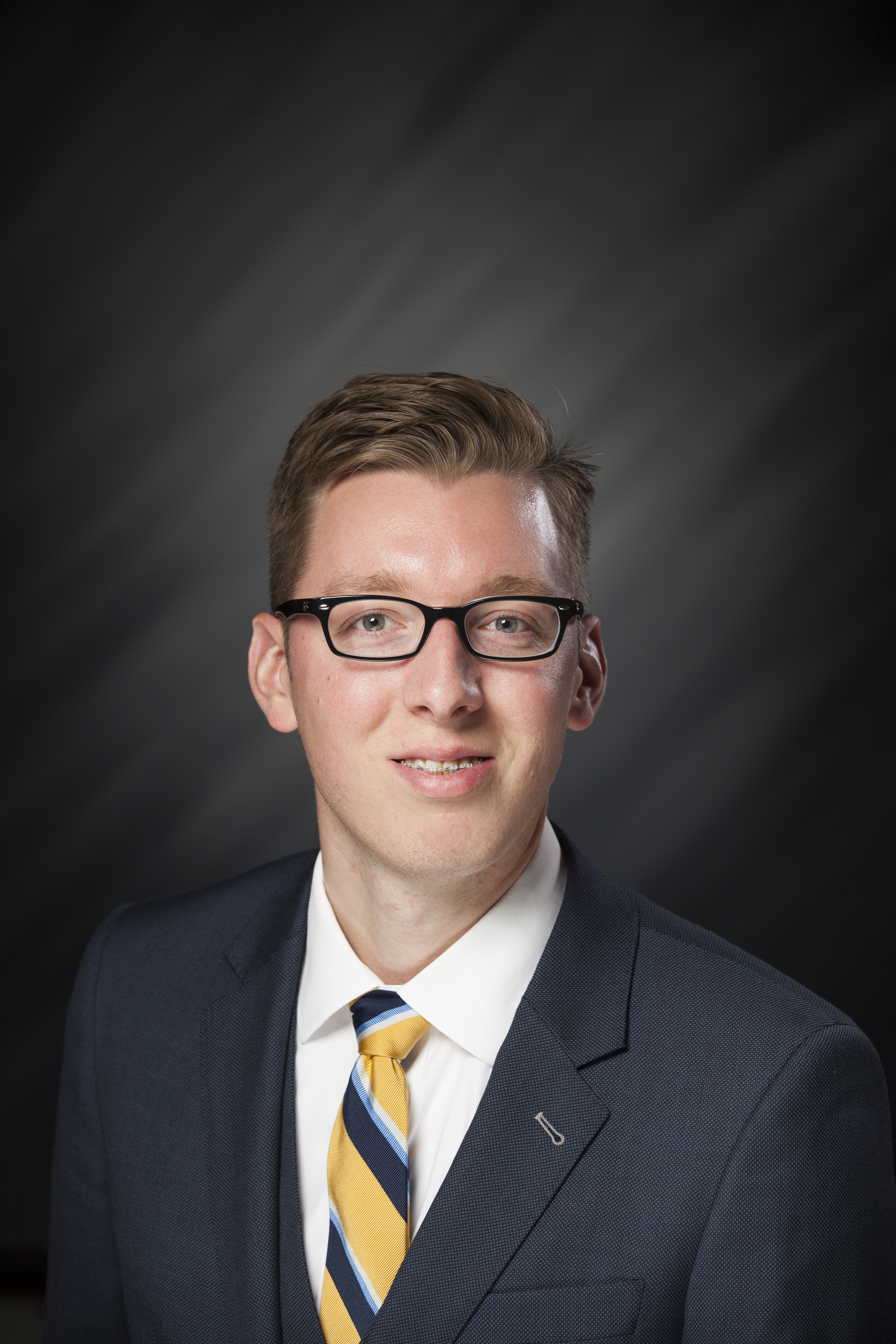

Member of the Indiana Utility Regulatory Commission
- In office April 2, 2018 – June 22, 2022
- Governor: Eric Holcomb
- Preceded by: Jim Atterholt
- Succeeded by: David Veleta

Member of the Indiana House of Representatives from the 82nd district
- In office November 7, 2012 – April 1, 2018
- Preceded by: Jeff Espich
- Succeeded by: David Abbott

Personal details
- Born: David Lee Ober; March 30, 1987 (age 39) Albion, Indiana, U.S.
- Party: Republican
- Spouse: Maggie Ober
- Education: Purdue University Northwest (BS)
- Website: Website

David Ober is an American politician serving as a member of the Indiana Utility Regulatory Commission. Prior to joining the IURC, he represented the 82nd district of the Indiana House of Representatives.

== Early life and education ==
Ober is a sixth-generation Hoosier who grew up in rural Albion, Indiana. He graduated from Central Noble High School in 2005 and earned a Bachelor of Science degree in computer graphics technology from Purdue University Northwest in 2009.

== Career ==
=== Indiana Legislature ===
Ober was appointed by House Speaker Brian Bosma to serve on the Agriculture and Rural Development, Government and Regulatory Reform, and Employment, Labor and Pensions Committees during the 2013 session of the Indiana General Assembly. Ober was appointed to the House Ways and Means Committee in December 2013, to fill a vacancy left by the passing of Representative Phyllis Pond (R-New Haven).

Ober was appointed assistant majority whip for the 119th General Assembly.

On November 23, 2016, Ober was appointed Chairman of the House Committee on Utilities, Energy and Telecommunications for the 120th General Assembly.

=== Indiana Utility Regulatory Commission ===
David Ober was appointed by Governor Eric Holcomb on April 2, 2018. He succeeded Jim Atterholt. He is a member of the NARUC Committee on Water and the Mid-America Regulatory Conference. He also serves as Secretary of the Board of Directors for the Organization of PJM States, Inc. (OPSI) and is vice-chair of the National Regulatory Research Institute (NRRI) Board of Directors. He resigned from the commission on June 22, 2022. He was succeeded by David Veleta.

== Electoral history ==
2012 Election

Ober was one of four candidates that ran for the vacant 82nd House district. The vacancy was due to the decennial redistricting of all state legislative and congressional districts in 2011. He won the May 8, 2012 Republican primary with 47% of the vote. In the November 6, 2012 general election, Ober defeated Democrat Mike Wilber to earn a first term in the Indiana House of Representatives.

Primary Election		General Election	
Michael Caywood	534	David Ober	15,113 ✔
Denise Lemmon	3,284	Mike Wilber	7,204
David Ober	3,550 ✔		
Wesley Ortell	238		

2014 Election

Ober was unopposed in the May 6, 2014 Republican primary election. In the November 4, 2014 general election, Ober defeated Democrat Mike Wilber in a rematch to earn a second term in the Indiana House of Representatives.

Primary Election		General Election	
David Ober	5,488 ✔	David Ober	9,654 ✔
		Mike Wilber	2,898
