= Don Lash =

American long-distance runner

Personal information
- Nationality: United States
- Born: August 15, 1912 Bluffton, Indiana
- Died: September 19, 1994 (aged 82) Terre Haute, Indiana
- Height: 5 ft 10 in (178 cm)
- Weight: 154 lb (70 kg)

Sport
- Sport: Running
- Events: World record 2 mi. - 8:58; American record: 10,000 m - 31:06.90
- College team: Indiana University Bloomington

External images
- Don Lash from USA Track & Field Hall of Fame.
- Don Lash from IU Hoosiers Hall of Fame, 1982 inductees.
- Don Lash cartoon Cartoonist Frank Wykoff predicts an American long-distance win in the 1936 Olympics "if Lash sticks to one race."
- Don Lash at Indiana University, 1934, Indiana State Museum Collection.

Donald Ray Lash (August 15, 1912 – September 19, 1994) was an American long-distance runner who won 12 national titles from 1934 to 1940, including seven consecutive men's national cross-country championships, and who set a world's record for the two-mile run in 1936.

Born in Bluffton, Indiana, Lash grew up in Auburn, Indiana, where he graduated from high school in 1933 after setting a new Indiana state record of 4:30.5 for the indoor mile and 4:23.7 for the outdoor mile. As a student at Indiana University Bloomington, Lash set an American record of 31:06.9 for 10,000 meters. In June 1936, he broke Paavo Nurmi's world record for the two mile, running 8:58.4, besting Nurmi's record by 1.2 seconds. Competing in the 1936 Summer Olympics, he placed 13th in the 5,000-meter run and eighth in the 10,000-meter.

In 1938, Lash set a meet record of 14 min., 39 sec., for 5,000 meters at the Amateur Athletic Union indoor national championships. That same year he won the James E. Sullivan Award as the nation's top amateur athlete.

Lash attributed his endurance to his unusual ability to store oxygen in his system. Speaking to a meeting in Auburn in 1937, Lash said that he knew when he would win a race by having a blood count before running. Research done at the Harvard Fatigue Laboratory published in Science in 1937 found when running Lash had an oxygen intake of 5.35 L/min and commented, "This far exceeds previous records".

World War II precluded any further chance for Lash to compete in the Olympics. Having married Margaret Mendenhall in 1938, Lash began a law-enforcement career with the Indiana State Police, then became an agent with the Federal Bureau of Investigation in 1941. He retired from the FBI in 1962 to become a regional director of the Fellowship of Christian Athletes and appeared frequently as a motivational speaker.

In 1973, he opened a real estate business in Rockville, Indiana. He also was elected to five terms (1973–1982) as a Republican member of the Indiana State House of Representatives, serving Fountain, Montgomery and Parke counties.

Lash died of spinal cancer at a hospital in Terre Haute, Indiana, and is buried in Rush Creek Cemetery near Tangier in Parke County. Don and Margaret Lash had two sons and a daughter.

Don Lash Park in Auburn is named for him. Lash was inducted into the USA Track and Field Hall of Fame in 1995.

Lash's autobiography, The Iron Man from Indiana: the Don Lash Story, was published in 1999.

== Notes and references ==
Indiana House of Representatives
Preceded by Gary Lee Butler; Edward Earl Goble	Member of the Indiana House of Representatives from the 32nd district 1972–1982	Succeeded by Jeff Espich
