= Chip Perfect =

Member of the Indiana Senate

Member of the Indiana Senate from the 43rd district
- In office 2014 – September 26, 2023
- Preceded by: Johnny Nugent
- Succeeded by: Randy Maxwell

Personal details
- Party: Republican
- Spouse: Ellen Perfect
- Education: Purdue University

Clyde A. "Chip" Perfect Jr. is a former Republican member of the Indiana Senate. He represented District 43, which includes all of the counties of Ohio and Jennings along with parts of the counties of Bartholomew, Dearborn, Decatur, Jackson, and Ripley. He was elected to the Senate in 2014, succeeding Johnny Nugent. He was a member of the Senate's committees on agriculture, local government, natural resources, and pensions and labor. Perfect introduced a bill in 2019 to remove restrictions on child labor, raising conflict-of-interest concerns, as this would likely benefit his business.

== Education and business career ==
Perfect received bachelor's degree from Purdue University in agricultural education.

Perfect is president and CEO of Perfect North Slopes, a ski resort in southeastern Indiana, close to Lawrenceburg. He is also a former president of the Midwest Ski Areas Association.

== State Senate tenure ==
Perfect was elected to his seat in 2014, winning 71.7% of the vote against Democrat Rudy Howard. He ran unopposed in the primary and general elections in 2018.

Perfect was chairman of the Senate Commerce Chairman. He introduced a bill in 2019 to repeal restrictions on child labor; the legislation would likely benefit his business, which employs hundreds of minors each winter. Perfect's bill would have removed work permit requirements and work hour restrictions for 16- and 17-year-old students. Perfect and some other business leaders described the regulations as burdensome, while the Indiana School Boards Association opposed the bill. After Common Cause Indiana and others raised conflict-of-interest concerns about Perfect's sponsorship of the measure, he backed away from the proposal but said that he did nothing wrong by introducing the bill and that the Senate Ethics Committee had approved his bill sponsorship.

In 2020, Perfect was the only Indiana lawmaker to vote against legislation prohibiting businesses from requiring the "implantation of any identity or tracking device" (such as a microchip) as a condition of employment without the employee's consent. The legislation had unanimously passed the state House and passed 9–1 in the Senate Pensions and Labor Committee, with Perfect the sole "no" vote. In August 2023, Perfect announce he will resign from his seat in the Indiana Senate.

== Personal life ==
Perfect lives in Lawrenceburg.
