= Connor Essegian =

American basketball player (born 2003)

No. 0 – Nebraska Cornhuskers
- Position: Shooting guard
- League: Big Ten Conference

Personal information
- Born: December 12, 2003 (age 22) Fort Wayne, Indiana, U.S.
- Listed height: 6 ft 4 in (1.93 m)
- Listed weight: 195 lb (88 kg)

Career information
- High school: Central Noble (Albion, Indiana)
- College: Wisconsin (2022–2024); Nebraska (2024–present)

Career highlights
- College Basketball Crown champion (2025); Big Ten All-Freshman team (2023)

Connor Essegian (born December 12, 2003) is an American college basketball player for the Nebraska Cornhuskers of the Big Ten Conference.

== Early life and high school career ==
Essegian attended Central Noble High School in Albion, Indiana, where he played basketball. As a sophomore, he led Central Noble to its first NECC Tournament in 50 years and its programs best overall record (22–5). That year he averaged 24.0 points, 7.9 rebounds and 2.2 steals per game. His 648 points scored during his sophomore campaign was this highest single season scoring total in Noble County history. As a junior, Essegian led the Cougars to a 20–1 record while averaging 24.0 points, 6.6 rebounds, 3.7 assists and 2.3 steals per game while shooting better than 41 percent from 3-point range. He scored a school record 44 points during the conference tournament quarterfinals. During his senior season, Connor averaged over 26 points per game (68% FG, 43% 3FG) and led Central Noble to the Indiana Class 2A state basketball championship game. Essegian finished his high school career as one of the most prolific scorers in Indiana state high school history placing 10th on the all–time list with 2,526 points, passing other Indiana high school greats like Larry Bird, Shawn Kemp, Eric Gordon, Steve Alford and Oscar Robertson. Essegian was named one of five finalists for 2022 Indiana Mr. Basketball joining Travis Grayson, CJ Gunn, Fletcher Loyer and eventual winner Braden Smith.

=== Recruiting ===
Essegian received 32 NCAA Division I offers. He trimmed his list down to seven and chose Wisconsin over Butler, Creighton, Minnesota, Wake Forest, Loyola (IL) and IPFW.

College recruiting
Name	Hometown	School	Height	Weight	Commit date
Connor Essegian; SG	Fort Wayne, IN	Central Noble High School (IN)	6 ft 4 in (1.93 m)	180 lb (82 kg)	Sep 15, 2021
Connor Essegian; SG	Recruit ratings: Scout: Rivals: 247Sports: ESPN: (78)				
Overall recruit ranking:
Note: In many cases, Scout, Rivals, 247Sports, On3, and ESPN may conflict in their listings of height and weight.; In these cases, the average was taken. ESPN grades are on a 100-point scale.; Sources: "2022 Wisconsin Commitments". Rivals.; "Men's Basketball Recruiting". Scout.; "ESPN- Wisconsin Badgers Men's Basketball Recruiting". ESPN.; "Scout.com Team Recruiting Rankings". Scout.; "2022 Team Ranking". Rivals.

== College career ==
=== Wisconsin ===
==== Freshman season ====
As a freshman, Essegian started the season coming off the bench as a 3-point specialist. Midway through the season, with the Badgers were dealing with injuries and the lack of scoring, coach Greg Gard inserted Essegian into the starting lineup for Jordan Davis. Essegian then scored a career-high 24 points in a defeat to Michigan. He finished the season as the Badgers third-leading scorer averaging 11.7 points per game. Essegian broke the Badgers freshman single-season 3-point record with 69 made threes surpassing Brad Davison's mark of 60 in 2018. Essegian was also named to the Big Ten All–Freshman team, becoming just the eighth Badgers to earn the honor. After his freshman season, Connor was invited to represent the Armenia men's national basketball team as they attempt to quality for the 2027 FIBA Basketball World Cup.

==== Sophomore season ====
Essegian was expected to be a big part and a starter for the Badgers 2023–24 season. However, he was asked to come off the bench to start the season after the Badgers signed AJ Storr in the NCAA transfer portal from St. John's. The Badgers lacked bench scoring the previous season and this was a way for coach Gard to have a valuable scoring threat coming off the bench. Essegian's playing time was limited in his sophomore season due to an early season back injury and lackluster defense according to Gard.

=== Nebraska ===
==== Junior Season ====
On April 21, 2024, Essegian transferred to Nebraska. Essegian saw a big uptick in playing time with Nebraska compared to his sophomore season at Wisconsin. Despite coming off the bench for most of the season, Essegian was the Cornhuskers' third leading scorer behind Brice Williams and Juwan Gary.

== Career statistics ==
Legend
GP	Games played	GS	Games started	MPG	Minutes per game
FG%	Field goal percentage	3P%	3-point field goal percentage	FT%	Free throw percentage
RPG	Rebounds per game	APG	Assists per game	SPG	Steals per game
BPG	Blocks per game	PPG	Points per game	**Bold**	Career high

=== College ===
Year	Team	GP	GS	MPG	FG%	3P%	FT%	RPG	APG	SPG	BPG	PPG
2022–23	Wisconsin	**35**	**19**	**27.4**	.404	.359	.884	**3.7**	0.7	**0.5**	0.0	**11.7**
2023–24	Wisconsin	33	0	7.3	.385	.303	**.909**	0.8	0.2	0.1	0.0	3.2
2024–25	Nebraska	30	3	22.5	**.405**	**.393**	.837	2.8	**1.1**	**0.5**	**0.1**	10.7
2025–26	Nebraska	7	0	14.0	.318	.258	.500	1.3	0.9	0.3	0.0	5.4
Career		110	22	19.0	.398	.353	.845	2.4	0.7	0.4	0.0	8.4

== Personal life ==
Essegian's parents are Rich and Jody Essegian. The cousin of Connor's grandfather is MLB hall of Famer Robin Yount. Another cousin of Connor's grandfather is Chuck Essegian who played college football and baseball, played in the 1952 Rose Bowl. He also played 6 seasons (1958–63) where he played in the 1959 World Series with the Los Angeles Dodgers.
