= Jeff Espich =

American politician

Member of the Indiana House of Representatives from the 82nd district
- In office November 4, 1992 – November 7, 2012
- Preceded by: Constituency established
- Succeeded by: David Ober

Member of the Indiana House of Representatives from the 32nd district
- In office November 3, 1982 – November 4, 1992
- Preceded by: Donald Ray Lash
- Succeeded by: Richard A. "Pete" Beck

Member of the Indiana House of Representatives from the 24th district
- In office November 8, 1972 – November 3, 1982
- Preceded by: John Joseph Thomas
- Succeeded by: Nelson Jaeger Becker

Personal details
- Born: November 8, 1942 (age 83) Bluffton, Indiana
- Party: Republican
- Spouse: Sharon
- Children: 2
- Education: Indiana University (BS)

Jeffrey Keller Espich (born November 8, 1942) is an American former politician from the state of Indiana. A Republican, he served in the Indiana House of Representatives from 1972 to 2012. He previously served in the United States Army from 1965 to 1967. Espich served as was Speaker Pro Tempore of the Indiana House of Representatives from 1985 to 1990. In 2012, Mike Pence chose Espich to be Senior Advisor for Legislative Affairs for his administration.

Indiana House of Representatives
| Preceded by John Joseph Thomas | Member of the Indiana House of Representatives from the 24th district 1972–1982 | Succeeded by Nelson Jaeger Becker |
| Preceded by Donald Ray Lash | Member of the Indiana House of Representatives from the 32nd district 1982–1992 | Succeeded by Richard A. "Pete" Beck |
| New constituency | Member of the Indiana House of Representatives from the 82nd district 1992–2012 | Succeeded by David Ober |
