= Indiana Utility Regulatory Commission =

State agency in Indiana, United States

The Indiana Utility Regulatory Commission (IURC) is the public utilities commission of the state of Indiana, led by five commissioners appointed by the governor.

The commission regulates electric, natural gas, telecommunications, steam, water and sewer utilities.

== History ==
The commission was established by the Indiana General Assembly as the Railroad Commission in the late 1800s to regulate the railroads in the state. On March 4, 1913, Governor Samuel M. Ralston signed the Shively-Spencer Utility Act giving it the additional authority to regulate electric, natural gas, water, private sewer, and telephone utilities along with common carriers (trucking) and renaming it as the Public Service Commission. The act replaced legislation from 1891 in which the state had given cities and towns the ability to contract with utilities for service and to set rates by local ordinance. Utilities with existing municipal franchises could surrender them and place themselves under the commission's regulation by accepting an "indeterminate permit".

In 1987, the commission was given its current name of Indiana Utility Regulatory Commission.

== Divisions ==
=== Electric ===
The Electric Division of the IURC regulates five major investor owned electric utilities: Duke Energy Indiana, Indiana-Michigan Power, Indianapolis Power and Light Company, Northern Indiana Public Service Company (NIPSCO), and Vectren Energy Delivery of Indiana.

In addition, nine of the 72 municipally owned utilities operating in Indiana remain under the Commission's jurisdiction for rate regulation: Richmond Municipal, Anderson Municipal, Crawfordsville Municipal, Auburn Municipal, Frankfort Municipal, Lebanon Municipal, Tipton Municipal, Knightstown Municipal, Kingsford Heights Municipal, and Greenfield Mills, Inc. Power & Light.

=== Natural Gas ===
The Natural Gas division regulates the rates, charges, and terms of service for intrastate gas pipelines and LDCs. It inspects federal all intrastate natural gas facilities in accord with federal safety regulations. Additionally, the Natural Gas division reviews gas cost adjustments (GCAs), financial arrangements, service territory requests, and assists in investigatory proceedings when these docketed proceedings are filed with the Commission. It also analyzes various forms of alternative regulatory proposals, such as rate decoupling, rate adjustment mechanisms, and customer choice initiatives.

=== Telecommunications ===
The Communications Division monitors regulatory proceedings and policy initiatives at the federal, state, and local levels to determine the impact of those policies. The division implements universal service programs and provides recommendations on applications for certificates of territorial authority for communications service providers and state franchises for video service providers. The Communications Division also resolves carrier-to-carrier disputes, manages policies regarding telephone numbering resources (pursuant to federal and state law), protects consumers from unauthorized changes to their service, and implements universal service programs.

=== Water and wastewater ===
The Water and Sewer Division regulates 89 of the 555 water utilities and 45 of the 547 wastewater utilities in Indiana. Although the IURC regulates only a fraction of the water utilities, these entities serve approximately 45% of Indiana's water consumers. Approximately 85% of Indiana customers, however, are served by non-jurisdictional wastewater utilities.

=== Consumer Affairs ===
The Consumer Affairs Division resolves customer complaints by ensuring utility compliance with Commission rules and regulations by investigating consumer allegations and issuing timely determinations. The types of issues handled by the Consumer Affairs Division include: deposits, billing, termination of service, customer rights, and utility responsibilities.

=== Legal ===
The IURC Legal Division aids in the development of the commissions “Rules and Regulations Concerning Practice and Procedure” as well as “Rules and Regulations and Standards of Service” to govern each type of utility through Title 170 of the Indiana Administrative Code. These changes follow a rulemaking process which, if applied to Indiana Code, require approval from the Governor and Attorney General.

== Commissioners ==
The five commissioners are appointed by the governor for four-year terms. No more than three of the commissioners can be from the same political party as the governor. The current commissioners are Andy Zay, Bob Deig, Anthony Swinger, David Veleta, and David Ziegner. Swinger is the Chairman.

Commissioner	Appointment	Departure
Thomas Duncan	1913	1917
John F. McClure	1913	1917
Charles J. Murphy	1913	1916
Charles A. Edwards	1913	1919
James L. Clark	1913	1919
Edwin M. Lee	1916	1917
E.I. Lewis	1917	1921
John W. McCardle	1917	1932
William J. Wood	1917	1918
Edwin Corr	1917	1919
Paul P. Haynes	1918	1921
Glen Van Auken	1919	1923
Fred Bates Johnson	1919	1921
Edgar M. Blessing	1921	1923
George M. Darnard	1921	1922
Maurice Douglas	1921	1925
Oscar Ratts	1922	1924
Samuel R. Artman	1923	1926
Frank Wampler	1923	1927
Frank T. Singleton	1924	1932
Clyde H. Jones	1925	1927
Howell Ellis	1926	1933
C.F. McIntosh	1927	1931
Harvey Harmon	1927	1929
Jere West	1929	1933
Harry K. Cuthbertson	1931	1932
Ralph M. Young	1932	1933
Perry McCart	1933	1940
Samuel L. Trabue	1933	1937
Moie Cook	1933	1940
Fred F. Bays	1937	1939
William A. Stuckey	1939	1944
Frederick F. Eichhorn	1941	1943
George M. Barnard	1941	1944
George N. Beamer	1943	1944
Hugh W. Abbett	1944	1945
Lawrence W. Cannon	1944	1951
unknown		
Roscoe P. Freeman	1944	1945
Leroy E. Yoder	1945	1949
Lawrence E. Carlson	1945	1949
unknown	1949	1951
unknown	1949	1953
Crawford F. Parker	1951	1952
Wendell Tennis	1951	1957
Wallace Weatherholt	1952	1953
Warren Buchanan	1953	1957
M. Elliot Belshaw	1953	1957
Garland G. Skelton	1957	1958
Ira L. Haymaker	1957	1962
John W. Van Ness	1957	1959
Leslie Duvall	1958	1961
Robert S. Webb	1959	1961
C. Patrick Clancy	1961	1970
Merton Stanley	1961	1967
Phillip L. Bayt	1963	1969
Richard P. Stein	1967	1970
John L. Ryan	1969	1970
George B. Jeffrey	1970	1971
David J. Allen	1970	1975
William B. Powers	1971	1982
W.W. Hill Jr.	1971	1974
unknown	1971	1971
Larry J. Wallace	1974	1984
James M. Plaskett	1975	1981
Peggy Boehm	1981	1985
William W. Montgomery	1982	1986
Michael G. Banta	1984	1985
Willis N. Zagrovich	1984	1989
Frederick L. Corban	1984	1995
unknown	1985	1989
Karl O'Lessker	1986	1990
Vicky A. Bailey	1986	1993
James R. Monk	1989	1993
G. Richard Klein	1990	2000
David E. Ziegner	1990	Current
Mary Jo Huffman	1993	1998
John F. Mortell	1994	1997
Camie J. Swanson-Hull	1996	2004
William D. McCarty	1997	2005
Judith G. Ripley	1998	2005
David W. Hadley	2000	2006
Larry S. Landis	2003	2014
Gregory D. Server	2005	2009
David Lott Hardy	2005	2010
Jeffrey L. Golc	2007	2010
Jim Atterholt	2009	2014
Carolene R. Mays	2010	2015
Carol A. Stephan	2014	2017
Angela Weber	2014	2018
Jim Huston	2014	2026
Sarah Freeman	2016	2025
Jim Atterholt	2017	2018
David Ober	2018	2022
Stefanie Krevda	2018	2023
David Veleta	2022	Current
Wesley Bennett	2023	2025
Bob Deig	2026	Current
Anthony Swinger	2026	Current
Andy Zay	2026	Current
