= William Cochran (Indiana politician) =

American politician (1934–2019)

Member of the Indiana House of Representatives from the 72nd district
- In office November 3, 1982 – November 5, 2008
- Preceded by: Vaneta Becker
- Succeeded by: Edward Clere

Member of the Indiana House of Representatives from the 68th district
- In office November 6, 1974 – November 3, 1982
- Preceded by: Maurice Hainley McDaniel
- Succeeded by: Bob Bischoff

Personal details
- Born: August 25, 1934 New Albany, Indiana
- Died: January 3, 2019 (aged 84)
- Party: Democratic
- Spouse: Judith Ann
- Education: Indiana University Southeast
- Occupation: real estate agent

William Charles Cochran (August 25, 1934 – January 3, 2019) was a Democratic member of the Indiana House of Representatives. He represented the 72nd District from 1982 to 2008 and the 68th District from 1974 to 1982.

Cochran was born in New Albany, Indiana. He went to Indiana University Southeast. Cochran was involved with the real estate business. Cochran served as the Floyd County Clerk from 1967 to 1974.
