= 2022 Maui Invitational =

Early-season American college basketball tournament

2022 Maui Invitational Tournament
- Season: 2022–23
- Teams: 8
- Finals site: Lahaina Civic Center, Maui, Hawaii
- Champions: Arizona (3rd title)
- Runner-up: Creighton (1st title game)
- Semifinalists: Arkansas (2nd semifinal); San Diego State (3rd semifinal)
- Winning coach: Tommy Lloyd (1st title)
- MVP: Oumar Ballo (Arizona)

The 2022 Maui Invitational Tournament was an early-season college basketball tournament that was played for the 39th time. The tournament began in 1984 and was part of the 2022–23 NCAA Division I men's basketball season. The tournament returned to Maui, Hawaii for the first time since 2019 due to the COVID-19 pandemic. The Championship Round featured the Arizona Wildcats & Creighton Bluejays. Arizona won their 3rd tournament title by a score of 81–79. Oumar Ballo was the tournament MVP, averaging 21.0 points, 10.7 rebounds & shot 79.4% from the field. The game was played at the Lahaina Civic Center in Maui from November 21 to 23, 2022.

== Teams ==
Team	Most Recent Appearance	Best Finish
Arizona	2018	Champion (2014, 2000)
Arkansas	2013	Runner-Up (1991)
Cincinnati	2009	Runner-Up (2009)
Creighton	first appearance	–
Louisville	2004	3rd-Place (1989)
Ohio State	2003	3rd-Place (1993)
San Diego State	2018	Runner-Up (2014)
Texas Tech	first appearance	–

== Bracket ==
5th Place Game; Wednesday, November 23
21	Texas Tech	73
Ohio State	80
7th Place Game
Louisville	62
Cincinnati	81

Consolation 2nd Round; Tuesday, November 22
21	Texas Tech	70
Louisville	38
Ohio State	81
Cincinnati	53

First Round; Monday, November 21
21	Texas Tech	65
10	Creighton	76
Louisville	54
9	Arkansas	80
Ohio State	77
17	San Diego State	88
Cincinnati	93
14	Arizona	101

Semifinals; Tuesday, November 22
10	Creighton	90
9	Arkansas	87
17	San Diego State	70
14	Arizona	87

Championship; Wednesday, November 23
10	Creighton	79
14	Arizona	81
3rd Place Game
9	Arkansas	78*
17	San Diego State	74

=== All Tournament Team ===
- Oumar Ballo (MVP) – Arizona
- Daniel Batcho – Texas Tech
- Anthony Black – Arkansas
- Ryan Nembhard – Creighton
- Ąžuolas Tubelis – Arizona
