= 2022–23 Creighton Bluejays men's basketball team =

Basketball team in 2022–23

2022–23 Creighton Bluejays men's basketball

NCAA tournament, Elite Eight
- Conference: Big East Conference

Ranking
- Coaches: No. 12
- Record: 24–13 (14–6 Big East)
- Head coach: Greg McDermott (13th season)
- Assistant coaches: Alan Huss (5th season); Ryan Miller (2nd season); Jalen Courtney-Williams (2nd season)
- Home arena: CHI Health Center Omaha

2022–23 Big East men's basketball standings
	Conf.				Overall
Team	W		L	PCT	W		L	PCT
No. 6 Marquette †	17	–	3	.850	29	–	7	.806
No. 13 Xavier	15	–	5	.750	27	–	10	.730
Creighton	14	–	6	.700	24	–	13	.649
No. 10 UConn	13	–	7	.650	31	–	8	.795
Providence	13	–	7	.650	21	–	12	.636
Villanova	10	–	10	.500	17	–	17	.500
Seton Hall	10	–	10	.500	17	–	16	.515
St. John's	7	–	13	.350	18	–	15	.545
Butler	6	–	14	.300	14	–	18	.438
DePaul	3	–	17	.150	10	–	23	.303
Georgetown	2	–	18	.100	7	–	25	.219
† 2023 Big East tournament winner Rankings from AP poll

The 2022–23 Creighton Bluejays men's basketball team represented Creighton University in the 2022–23 NCAA Division I men's basketball season. The Bluejays were coached by 13th-year head coach Greg McDermott and played their home games at the CHI Health Center Omaha in Omaha, Nebraska as members of the Big East Conference. They finished the season 20–11, 14–6 in Big East play to finish in third place. As the No. 3 seed in the Big East tournament, they defeated Villanova before losing to Xavier in the semifinals. They received an at-large bid to the NCAA tournament as the No. 6 seed in the South Region, where they defeated NC State, Baylor, and Princeton to reach the Elite Eight for the first time since 1941. There, they fell to San Diego State on a last-second free throw, closing their season with an overall record of 24–13.

== Previous season ==
The Bluejays finished the 2021–22 season 23–12, 12–7 in Big East play to finish in fourth place. As the No. 4 seed in the Big East tournament, they defeated Marquette and Providence, before losing to Villanova in the Championship. They received an at-large bid to the NCAA tournament as the No. 6 seed in the Midwest Region, where they defeated San Diego State in the first round before losing to Kansas in the second round.

== Offseason ==
=== Departures ===
Name	Number	Pos.	Height	Weight	Year	Hometown	Reason for departure
KeyShawn Feazell	1	F	6'9"	230	GS senior	New Herbon, MS	Graduated
Alex O'Connell	5	G	6'6"	185	GS senior	Roswell, GA	Graduated
Rati Andronikashvili	21	G	6'4"	186	RS freshman	Tbilisi, Georgia	Left the team to pursue professional opportunities
Ryan Hawkins	44	F	6'7"	222	GS senior	Atlantic, IA	Graduated
Modestas Kancleris	55	F	6'9"	208	RS freshman	Kaunas, Lithuania	Transferred to Cal State Bakersfield

=== Incoming transfers ===
Name	Number	Pos.	Height	Weight	Year	Hometown	Previous school
Francisco Farabello	5	G	6'3"	178	Senior	Cañada de Gómez, Argentina	TCU
Baylor Scheierman	55	G	6'6"	205	Senior	Aurora, NE	South Dakota State

=== Recruiting classes ===
==== 2022 recruiting class ====
College recruiting
Name	Hometown	School	Height	Weight	Commit date
Jasen Green #23 PF	Omaha, NE	Millard North High School	6 ft 8 in (2.03 m)	230 lb (100 kg)	Sep 16, 2021
Jasen Green #23 PF	Recruit ratings: Rivals: 247Sports: ESPN: (81)				
Ben Shtolzberg #55 PF	Sherman Oaks, CA	Notre Dame High School	6 ft 5 in (1.96 m)	190 lb (86 kg)	Aug 15, 2021
Ben Shtolzberg #55 PF	Recruit ratings: Rivals: 247Sports: ESPN: (81)				
Fredrick King; C	Mexico City, Mexico	NBA Academy Latin America	6 ft 10 in (2.08 m)	220 lb (100 kg)	Apr 29, 2022
Fredrick King; C	Recruit ratings: Rivals: 247Sports: ESPN: (NR)				
Overall recruit ranking: Rivals: 12
Note: In many cases, Scout, Rivals, 247Sports, On3, and ESPN may conflict in their listings of height and weight.; In these cases, the average was taken. ESPN grades are on a 100-point scale.; Sources: "2022 Team Ranking". Rivals.

==== 2023 recruiting class ====
College recruiting (2023)
Name	Hometown	School	Height	Weight	Commit date
Josiah Dotzler; PG	Bellevue, NE	Bellevue West High School	6 ft 4 in (1.93 m)	180 lb (82 kg)	Aug 1, 2022
Josiah Dotzler; PG	Recruit ratings: Rivals: 247Sports: ESPN: (NR)				
Overall recruit ranking: Rivals: 12
Note: In many cases, Scout, Rivals, 247Sports, On3, and ESPN may conflict in their listings of height and weight.; In these cases, the average was taken. ESPN grades are on a 100-point scale.; Sources: "2023 Team Ranking". Rivals.

== Roster ==
2022–23 Creighton Bluejays men's basketball team
Players
Coaches

Pos.	#	Name	Height	Weight	Year	Previous school	Hometown
G	0	Jasen Green	6 ft 8 in (2.03 m)	225 lb (102 kg)	Fr	Millard North	Omaha, NE
G	1	Ben Shtolzberg	6 ft 4 in (1.93 m)	200 lb (91 kg)	Fr	Notre Dame	Northridge, CA
G	2	Ryan Nembhard	6 ft 0 in (1.83 m)	170 lb (77 kg)	So	Montverde Academy	Aurora, ON
G	4	Shereef Mitchell	6 ft 1 in (1.85 m)	170 lb (77 kg)	Jr	Sunrise Christian Academy	Omaha, NE
G	5	Francisco Farabello	6 ft 3 in (1.91 m)	185 lb (84 kg)	Sr	NBA Global Academy; TCU	Cañada de Gómez, Argentina
F	10	Zander Yates (W)	6 ft 7 in (2.01 m)	225 lb (102 kg)	RS Fr	Houston	Germantown, TN
C	11	Ryan Kalkbrenner	7 ft 1 in (2.16 m)	265 lb (120 kg)	Jr	Trinity Catholic HS	St. Louis, MO
F	13	Mason Miller	6 ft 8 in (2.03 m)	187 lb (85 kg)	RS Fr	Houston	Germantown, TN
G	14	Sami Osmani (W)	6 ft 4 in (1.93 m)	205 lb (93 kg)	Jr	Oak Lawn Community HS	Oak Lawn, IL
G	15	John Christofilis	6 ft 3 in (1.91 m)	195 lb (88 kg)	So	O'Dea	Seattle, WA
G	21	Evan Young (W)	5 ft 11 in (1.8 m)	160 lb (73 kg)	Fr	American Fork	Highland, UT
G	22	Devin Davis (W)	6 ft 0 in (1.83 m)	180 lb (82 kg)	Jr	George Westinghouse College Prep	Chicago, IL
G	23	Trey Alexander	6 ft 4 in (1.93 m)	190 lb (86 kg)	So	Heritage Hall	Oklahoma City, OK
F	24	Arthur Kaluma	6 ft 7 in (2.01 m)	225 lb (102 kg)	So	Dream City Christian	Glendale, AZ
C	33	Fredrick King	6 ft 10 in (2.08 m)	234 lb (106 kg)	Fr	NBA Academy Latin America	Mangrove Cay, Bahamas
G	55	Baylor Scheierman	6 ft 7 in (2.01 m)	205 lb (93 kg)	Sr	Aurora HS; South Dakota State	Aurora, NE

Head coach

- Greg McDermott (Northern Iowa)

Assistant coach(es)

- Alan Huss (Creighton)
- Ryan Miller (Northern State)
- Jalen Courtney-Williams (Morehead State)

Legend

- (C) Team captain
- (S) Suspended
- (I) Ineligible
- (W) Walk-on
- Injured
- Current redshirt

Roster

== Schedule and results ==
Date time, TV	Rank^{#}	Opponent^{#}	Result	Record	High points	High rebounds	High assists	Site (attendance) city, state
Exhibition
October 30, 2022*; 6:00 p.m., FloSports	No. 9	Drury	W 109–57		17 – Kaluma	10 – Scheierman	7 – Scheierman	CHI Health Center Omaha (16,092); Omaha, NE
Non-conference regular season
November 7, 2022*; 7:30 p.m., FS1	No. 9	St. Thomas (MN)	W 72–60	1–0	17 – Kaluma	10 – Scheierman	5 – Nembhard	CHI Health Center Omaha (17,098); Omaha, NE
November 10, 2022*; 8:00 p.m., FS1	No. 9	North Dakota	W 96–61	2–0	24 – Kalkbrenner	10 – Scheierman	6 – Nembhard	CHI Health Center Omaha (16,594); Omaha, NE
November 14, 2022*; 8:00 p.m., CBSSN	No. 10	Holy Cross	W 94–65	3–0	22 – Kalkbrenner	9 – Scheierman	12 – Nembhard	CHI Health Center Omaha (15,940); Omaha, NE
November 17, 2022*; 7:30 p.m., FS1	No. 10	UC Riverside	W 80–51	4–0	17 – Scheierman	9 – Alexander	4 – Tied	CHI Health Center Omaha (16,456); Omaha, NE
November 21, 2022*; 1:30 p.m., ESPN2	No. 10	vs. No. 21 Texas Tech; Maui Invitational Tournament quarterfinals	W 76–65	5–0	18 – Kaluma	12 – Scheierman	3 – Tied	Lahaina Civic Center (2,400); Maui, HI
November 22, 2022*; 7:00 p.m., ESPN	No. 10	vs. No. 9 Arkansas; Maui Invitational Tournament semifinals	W 90–87	6–0	25 – Nembhard	2 – Tied	6 – Alexander	Lahaina Civic Center (2,400); Maui, HI
November 23, 2022*; 4:00 p.m., ESPN	No. 10	vs. No. 14 Arizona; Maui Invitational Tournament championship	L 79–81	6–1	20 – Nembhard	11 – Scheierman	6 – Nembhard	Lahaina Civic Center (2,400); Maui, HI
December 1, 2022*; 6:00 p.m., ESPN	No. 7	at No. 2 Texas; Big East–Big 12 Battle	L 67–72	6–2	20 – Kalkbrenner	13 – Kalkbrenner	6 – Nembhard	Moody Center (10,896); Austin, TX
December 4, 2022*; 3:30 p.m., FS1	No. 7	Nebraska; Rivalry	L 53–63	6–3	16 – Farabello	11 – Scheierman	5 – Scheierman	CHI Health Center Omaha (17,352); Omaha, NE
December 10, 2022*; 9:00 p.m., FS1	No. 21	vs. BYU; Jack Jones Hoopfest	L 80–83	6–4	27 – Kaluma	11 – Scheierman	7 – Nembhard	Michelob Ultra Arena; Paradise, NV
December 12, 2022*; 8:00 p.m., FS1		vs. Arizona State; Jack Jones Hoopfest	L 71–73	6–5	18 – Scheierman	11 – King	9 – Nembhard	Michelob Ultra Arena; Paradise, NV
Big East regular season
December 16, 2022; 7:30 p.m., FS1		at Marquette	L 58–69	6–6 (0–1)	16 – King	11 – Scheiermann	4 – Tied	Fiserv Forum (15,389); Milwaukee, WI
December 22, 2022; 7:00 p.m., FS1		Butler	W 78–56	7–6 (1–1)	19 – Kalkbrenner	8 – Scheierman	5 – Nembhard	CHI Health Center Omaha (16,319); Omaha, NE
December 25, 2022; 3:30 p.m., FOX		DePaul	W 80–65	8–6 (2–1)	32 – Alexander	10 – Scheierman	7 – Nembhard	CHI Health Center Omaha (16,534); Omaha, NE
January 3, 2023; 7:30 p.m., FS1		Seton Hall	W 83–61	9–6 (3–1)	17 – Kalkbrenner	11 – Kaluma	6 – Alexander	CHI Health Omaha Center (16,592); Omaha, NE
January 7, 2023; 11:30 a.m., FOX		at No. 4 UConn	L 60–69	9–7 (3–2)	14 – Kaluma	16 – Kaluma	3 – Scheierman	Harry A. Gampel Pavilion (10,167); Storrs, CT
January 11, 2023; 6:00 p.m., FS1		at No. 12 Xavier	L 87–90	9–8 (3–3)	25 – Scheierman	9 – Kaluma	7 – Nembhard	Cintas Center (10,224); Cincinnati, OH
January 14, 2023; 1:00 p.m., FS1		No. 19 Providence	W 73–67	10–8 (4–3)	21 – Kalkbrenner	7 – Tied	3 – 3 Tied	CHI Health Center Omaha (17,443); Omaha, NE
January 17, 2023; 6:00 p.m., FS1		at Butler	W 73–52	11–8 (5–3)	12 – Tied	11 – Nembhard	5 – Scheierman	Hinkle Fieldhouse (7,329); Indianapolis, IN
January 25, 2023; 8:00 p.m., CBSSN		St. John's	W 104–76	12–8 (6–3)	17 – Scheierman	10 – Scheierman	6 – Tied	CHI Health Center Omaha (17,004); Omaha, NE
January 28, 2023; 11:15 a.m., CBS		No. 13 Xavier	W 84–67	13–8 (7–3)	20 – Kaluma	10 – Nembhard	8 – Nembhard	CHI Health Center Omaha (18,277); Omaha, NE
February 1, 2023; 5:36 p.m., CBSSN		at Georgetown	W 63–53	14–8 (8–3)	16 – Kalkbrenner	11 – Scheierman	5 – Alexander	Capital One Arena (4,042); Washington, D.C.
February 4, 2023; 6:30 p.m., FOX		Villanova	W 66–61	15–8 (9–3)	27 – Alexander	8 – Kaluma	5 – Nembhard	CHI Health Center Omaha (18,509); Omaha, NE
February 8, 2023; 5:30 p.m., FS1	No. 23	at Seton Hall	W 75–62	16–8 (10–3)	19 – Scheierman	9 – Scheierman	8 – Alexander	Prudential Center (8,875); Newark, NJ
February 11, 2023; 1:00 p.m., FOX	No. 23	No. 21 UConn	W 56–53	17–8 (11–3)	17 – Alexander	9 – Scheiereman	3 – Nembhard	CHI Health Center Omaha (18,266); Omaha, NE
February 14, 2023; 6:00 p.m., FS1	No. 18	at No. 24 Providence	L 86–94 ^{2OT}	17–9 (11–4)	21 – Nembhard	10 – Scheierman	6 – Nembhard	Amica Mutual Pavilion (12,400); Providence, RI
February 18, 2023; 6:30 p.m., FS1	No. 18	at St. John's	W 77–67	18–9 (12–4)	16 – Nembhard	8 – Kalkbrenner	5 – Tied	Carnesecca Arena (5,602); Queens, NY
February 21, 2023; 7:30 p.m., FS1	No. 19	No. 10 Marquette	L 71–73	18–10 (12–5)	18 – Scheierman	13 – Scheierman	5 – Tied	CHI Health Center Omaha (18,006); Omaha, NE
February 25, 2023; 11:00 a.m., FOX	No. 19	at Villanova	L 67–79	18–11 (12–6)	19 – Kaluma	6 – Kaluma	4 – Nembhard	Wells Fargo Center (17,114); Philadelphia, PA
March 1, 2023; 7:45 p.m., FS1		Georgetown	W 99–59	19–11 (13–6)	25 – Alexander	13 – Scheierman	6 – Tied	CHI Health Center Omaha (17,039); Omaha, NE
March 4, 2023; 8:00 p.m., FS1		at DePaul	W 84–70	20–11 (14–6)	21 – Alexander	11 – Nembhard	4 – Scheierman	Wintrust Arena (4,514); Chicago, IL
Big East tournament
March 9, 2023; 8:30 p.m., FS1	(3) No. 24	vs. (6) Villanova; Quarterfinals	W 87–74	21–11	21 – Kalkbrenner	12 – Scheierman	9 – Scheierman	Madison Square Garden (19,812); New York, NY
March 10, 2023; 8:00 p.m., FS1	(3) No. 24	vs. (2) No. 15 Xavier; Semifinals	L 60–82	21–12	18 – Kalkbrenner	7 – Scheierman	6 – Nembhard	Madison Square Garden (19,812); New York, NY
NCAA tournament
March 17, 2023*; 3:00 pm, TNT	(6 S)	vs. (11 S) NC State; First Round	W 72–63	22–12	31 – Kalkbrenner	9 – Kaluma	4 – Tied	Ball Arena (19,149); Denver, CO
March 19, 2023*; 6:10 p.m., TBS	(6 S)	vs. (3 S) No. 11 Baylor; Second Round	W 85–76	23–12	30 – Nembhard	8 – Alexander	5 – Alexander	Ball Arena; Denver, CO
March 24, 2023*; 8:00 p.m., TBS	(6 S)	vs. (15 S) Princeton; Sweet Sixteen	W 86–75	24–12	22 – Kalkbrenner	9 – Scheierman	8 – Nembhard	KFC Yum! Center (20,289); Louisville, KY
March 26, 2023*; 1:20 p.m., CBS	(6 S)	vs. (5 S) No. 18 San Diego State; Elite Eight	L 56–57	24–13	17 – Kalkbrenner	9 – Scheierman	4 – Scheierman	KFC Yum! Center (20,051); Louisville, KY
*Non-conference game. ^{#}Rankings from AP Poll. (#) Tournament seedings in parentheses. S=South. All times are in Central Time.
