= 2022–23 San Diego State Aztecs men's basketball team =

American college basketball season

2022–23 San Diego State Aztecs men's basketball

NCAA tournament, Runner-up Mountain West regular season champions Mountain West tournament champions

National Championship Game, L 59–76 vs. Connecticut
- Conference: Mountain West Conference

Ranking
- Coaches: No. 2
- AP: No. 18
- Record: 32–7 (15–3 MW)
- Head coach: Brian Dutcher (6th season)
- Assistant coaches: Dave Velasquez; Chris Acker; JayDee Luster
- Offensive scheme: Wheel
- Base defense: Pack-Line
- Home arena: Viejas Arena (Capacity: 12,414)

2022–23 Mountain West Conference men's basketball standings
	Conf.				Overall
Team	W		L	PCT	W		L	PCT
No. 18 San Diego State †	15	–	3	.833	32	–	7	.821
Boise State	13	–	5	.722	24	–	10	.706
Utah State	13	–	5	.722	26	–	9	.743
Nevada	12	–	6	.667	22	–	11	.667
San Jose State	10	–	8	.556	21	–	14	.600
New Mexico	8	–	10	.444	22	–	12	.647
UNLV	7	–	11	.389	19	–	13	.594
Colorado State	6	–	12	.333	15	–	18	.455
Fresno State	6	–	12	.333	11	–	20	.355
Air Force	5	–	13	.278	14	–	18	.438
Wyoming	4	–	14	.222	9	–	22	.290
† Conference tournament winner Rankings from AP poll

The 2022–23 San Diego State Aztecs men's basketball team represented San Diego State University during the 2022–23 NCAA Division I men's basketball season. The Aztecs were led by sixth-year head coach Brian Dutcher and played their home games at Viejas Arena as members in the Mountain West Conference.

The Aztecs finished the season 32–7, 15–3 in Mountain West play to win the Mountain West regular season championship. They defeated Colorado State, San Jose State, and Utah State to win the Mountain West tournament championship. As a result, they received the conference's automatic bid to the NCAA tournament as the No. 5 seed in the South region, the school's third straight trip to the tournament. They defeated Charleston and Furman to advance to the Sweet Sixteen for the first time since 2014. They defeated overall No. 1 seed Alabama and Creighton to advance to the Final Four for the first time in school history. In the national semifinal, they defeated Florida Atlantic to advance to the national championship game where they lost to UConn.

== Previous season ==
The Aztecs finished the 2021–22 season 23–9, 13–4 in Mountain West play to finish in third place. In the Mountain West tournament, they defeated Fresno State and Colorado State to advance to the championship game, where they lost to Boise State. They received an at-large bid to the NCAA tournament as the No. 8 seed in the Midwest Region, where they lost in the first round to Creighton.

== Offseason ==
=== Departures ===
Name	Number	Pos.	Height	Weight	Year	Hometown	Reason for departure
Trey Pulliam	4	G	6'3"	180	RS Senior	Bryan, TX	Graduated
Keith Dinwiddie Jr.	10	G	6'0"	185	Sophomore	Los Angeles, CA	Transferred to Weber State
Chad Baker-Mazara	20	F	6'7"	190	Sophomore	Santo Domingo, DR	Transferred to Northwest Florida State College
Tahirou Diabate	22	F	6'9"	225	RS Senior	Bamako, Mali	Graduated
Joshua Tomaić	23	F	6'9"	230	RS Senior	Lanzarote, Spain	Graduated
Max Wilson	25	G	6'6"	190	Freshman	Reston, VA	Walk-on; not on roster

=== Incoming transfers ===
Name	Number	Pos.	Height	Weight	Year	Hometown	Previous college
Micah Parrish	3	F	6'6"	194	Junior	Detroit, MI	Oakland
Darrion Trammell	12	G	5'10"	165	Senior	Marin City, CA	Seattle

=== 2022 recruiting class ===
College recruiting information
Name	Hometown	School	Height	Weight	Commit date
Elijah Saunders #28 PF	Phoenix, AZ	Sunnyslope High School	6 ft 7 in (2.01 m)	215 lb (98 kg)	Sep 24, 2021
Elijah Saunders #28 PF	Recruit ratings: Scout: Rivals: 247Sports: ESPN: (81)				
Miles Byrd; SG	Stockton, CA	Lincoln High School	6 ft 6 in (1.98 m)	175 lb (79 kg)	Jan 20, 2022
Miles Byrd; SG	Recruit ratings: Scout: Rivals: 247Sports: ESPN: (NR)				
Overall recruit ranking:
Note: In many cases, Scout, Rivals, 247Sports, On3, and ESPN may conflict in their listings of height and weight.; In these cases, the average was taken. ESPN grades are on a 100-point scale.; Sources: "2022 San Diego St. Basketball Commitment List". Rivals.; "2022 San Diego St. Player Commits". ESPN.; "2022 Team Ranking". Rivals.

== Roster ==
2022–23 San Diego State Aztecs men's basketball team
Players
Coaches

Pos.	#	Name	Height	Weight	Year	Previous school	Hometown
F	0	Keshad Johnson	6 ft 7 in (2.01 m)	225 lb (102 kg)	Sr	San Leandro HS	Oakland, California
G	2	Adam Seiko	6 ft 3 in (1.91 m)	210 lb (95 kg)	RS Sr	Sierra Canyon HS	Boston, Massachusetts
G/F	3	Micah Parrish	6 ft 6 in (1.98 m)	200 lb (91 kg)	Jr	River Rouge HS; Oakland	Detroit, Michigan
G	4	Jared Barnett (W)	6 ft 1 in (1.85 m)	155 lb (70 kg)	Sr	Westchester HS	Los Angeles, California
G	5	Lamont Butler	6 ft 0 in (1.83 m)	200 lb (91 kg)	Jr	Riverside Poly HS	Moreno Valley, California
G	10	Cam Lawin (W)	6 ft 3 in (1.91 m)	175 lb (79 kg)	Fr	Orr Academy	Chicago, Illinois
F	11	Demarshay Johnson Jr.	6 ft 9 in (2.06 m)	235 lb (107 kg)	RS Fr	Salesian College Prep	Richmond, California
G	12	Darrion Trammell	5 ft 10 in (1.78 m)	165 lb (75 kg)	Sr	St. Ignatius College Prep; Seattle	Marin City, California
F	13	Jaedon LeDee	6 ft 9 in (2.06 m)	240 lb (109 kg)	Sr	The Kinkaid School; TCU	Houston, Texas
F	14	Cade Alger (W)	6 ft 9 in (2.06 m)	195 lb (88 kg)	RS Jr	Ripon Christian HS; Seattle	Ripon, California
G	20	Matt Bradley	6 ft 4 in (1.93 m)	220 lb (100 kg)	GS	Wasatch Academy; California	San Bernardino, California
G	21	Miles Byrd	6 ft 7 in (2.01 m)	175 lb (79 kg)	Fr	Lincoln	Stockton, California
G	24	Tyler Broughton (W)	6 ft 4 in (1.93 m)	190 lb (86 kg)	Jr	Tesoro HS	Ladera Ranch, California
F	25	Elijah Saunders	6 ft 8 in (2.03 m)	240 lb (109 kg)	Fr	Sunnyslope	Phoenix, Arizona
F	31	Nathan Mensah	6 ft 10 in (2.08 m)	230 lb (104 kg)	Sr	Findlay Prep	Accra, Ghana
F	33	Aguek Arop	6 ft 7 in (2.01 m)	225 lb (102 kg)	Sr	Omaha South HS	Omaha, Nebraska
G	42	Triston Broughton (W)	6 ft 4 in (1.93 m)	190 lb (86 kg)	Jr	Tesoro HS	Ladera Ranch, California

Head coach

- Brian Dutcher (Minnesota)

Assistant coach(es)

- Dave Velasquez (San Diego State)
- Chris Acker (Chaminade)
- JayDee Luster (Wyoming)

Legend

- (C) Team captain
- (S) Suspended
- (I) Ineligible
- (W) Walk-on
- Injured
- Current redshirt

Roster

== Schedule and results ==
Date time, TV	Rank^{#}	Opponent^{#}	Result	Record	High points	High rebounds	High assists	Site (attendance) city, state
Exhibition
November 1, 2022*; 7:00 p.m.	No. 19	San Diego Christian	W 102–52		13 – Tied	9 – LeDee	6 – Butler	Viejas Arena (11,697); San Diego, CA
Non-conference regular season
November 7, 2022*; 7:00 p.m., YurView	No. 19	Cal State Fullerton	W 80–57	1–0	18 – Trammell	6 – Mensah	6 – Bradley	Viejas Arena (11,934); San Diego, CA
November 11, 2022*; 7:30 p.m., YurView	No. 19	BYU; Rivalry	W 82–75	2–0	23 – LeDee	10 – Mensah	4 – Trammell	Viejas Arena (12,414); San Diego, CA
November 15, 2022*; 6:00 p.m., P12N	No. 17	at Stanford	W 74–62	3–0	14 – LeDee	6 – Mensah	6 – Tied	Maples Pavilion (3,945); Stanford, CA
November 21, 2022*; 6:00 p.m., ESPN2	No. 17	vs. Ohio State; Maui Invitational Tournament Quarterfinals	W 88–77	4–0	18 – Bradley	5 – Tied	4 – Trammell	Lahaina Civic Center (2,400); Maui, HI
November 22, 2022*; 7:30 p.m., ESPN	No. 17	vs. No. 14 Arizona; Maui Invitational Tournament Semifinals	L 70–87	4–1	21 – Trammell	7 – Mensah	2 – Trammell	Lahaina Civic Center (2,400); Maui, HI
November 23, 2022*; 7:00 p.m., ESPN2	No. 17	vs. No. 9 Arkansas; Maui Invitational Tournament – 3rd Place	L 74–78 ^{OT}	4–2	23 – Bradley	8 – Bradley	2 – Trammell	Lahaina Civic Center (2,400); Maui, HI
November 29, 2022*; 7:00 p.m., YurView	No. 24	UC Irvine	W 72–69	5–2	18 – Mensah	6 – Tied	5 – Trammell	Viejas Arena (12,414); San Diego, CA
December 2, 2022*; 7:00 p.m., YurView	No. 24	Occidental	W 95–57	6–2	20 – Seiko	8 – Saunders	8 – Bradley	Viejas Arena (12,115); San Diego, CA
December 5, 2022*; 7:00 p.m., YurView	No. 22	Troy	W 60–55	7–2	19 – Bradley	9 – Mensah	4 – Trammell	Viejas Arena (12,038); San Diego, CA
December 10, 2022*; 12:00 p.m., ESPN+	No. 22	vs. Saint Mary's; Jerry Colangelo Classic	L 61–68	7–3	13 – Bradley	8 – LeDee	4 – Tied	Footprint Center; Phoenix, AZ
December 12, 2022*; 7:00 p.m., YurView		Kennesaw State	W 88–54	8–3	19 – Parrish	9 – Mensah	4 – Tied	Viejas Arena (11,532); San Diego, CA
December 20, 2022*; 7:30 p.m., FS1		UC–San Diego	W 62–46	9–3	18 – Trammell	12 – LeDee	4 – Trammell	Viejas Arena (12,414); San Diego, CA
Mountain West regular season
December 28, 2022; 8:00 p.m., FS1		Air Force	W 71–55	10–3 (1–0)	27 – Bradley	7 – Mensah	5 – Trammell	Viejas Arena (12,414); San Diego, CA
December 31, 2022; 1:00 p.m., CBS		at UNLV; Rivalry	W 76–67	11–3 (2–0)	23 – Bradley	11 – Mensah	5 – Trammell	Thomas & Mack Center (7,249); Paradise, NV
January 7, 2023; 1:00 p.m., CBS		at Wyoming	W 80–75	12–3 (3–0)	23 – Butler	9 – LeDee	3 – Tied	Arena-Auditorium (4,346); Laramie, WY
January 10, 2023; 8:00 p.m., CBSSN	No. 23	Nevada	W 74–65	13–3 (4–0)	17 – Bradley	10 – Bradley	4 – Tied	Viejas Arena (12,183); San Diego, CA
January 14, 2023; 6:00 p.m., CBSSN	No. 23	New Mexico	L 67–76	13–4 (4–1)	14 – Bradley	7 – Johnson	5 – Bradley	Viejas Arena (12,414); San Diego, CA
January 18, 2023; 7:30 p.m., FS1		at Colorado State	W 82–76 ^{OT}	14–4 (5–1)	19 – Butler	7 – Johnson	7 – Bradley	Moby Arena (6,008); Fort Collins, CO
January 21, 2023; 7:00 p.m., CBSSN		at Air Force	W 70–60	15–4 (6–1)	13 – Tied	10 – Johnson	2 – Tied	Clune Arena (1,489); Colorado Springs, CO
January 25, 2023; 8:00 p.m., CBSSN		Utah State	W 85–75	16–4 (7–1)	25 – Seiko	10 – Johnson	4 – Tied	Viejas Arena (12,239); San Diego, CA
January 28, 2023; 6:00 p.m., FS1		San José State	W 72–51	17–4 (8–1)	16 – Johnson	8 – Tied	5 – Butler	Viejas Arena (12,414); San Diego, CA
January 31, 2023; 8:00 p.m., CBSSN	No. 22	at Nevada	L 66–75	17–5 (8–2)	16 – Bradley	5 – LeDee	5 – Butler	Lawlor Events Center (9,357); Reno, NV
February 3, 2023; 6:00 p.m., FS1	No. 22	Boise State	W 72–52	18–5 (9–2)	17 – Mensah	6 – Mensah	7 – Trammell	Viejas Arena (12,414); San Diego, CA
February 8, 2023; 7:00 p.m., CBSSN	No. 25	at Utah State	W 63–61	19–5 (10–2)	18 – Bradley	10 – LeDee	5 – Butler	Smith Spectrum (8,765); Logan, UT
February 11, 2023; 1:00 p.m., FOX	No. 25	UNLV; Rivalry	W 82–71	20–5 (11–2)	18 – Seiko	11 – Mensah	7 – Butler	Viejas Arena (12,414); San Diego, CA
February 15, 2023; 8:00 p.m., CBSSN	No. 21	at Fresno State	W 45–43	21–5 (12–2)	10 – Bradley	9 – Johnson	3 – Bradley	Save Mart Center (7,012); Fresno, CA
February 21, 2023; 8:00 p.m., CBSSN	No. 22	Colorado State	W 77–58	22–5 (13–2)	14 – LeDee	6 – Tied	5 – Tied	Viejas Arena (12,414); San Diego, CA
February 25, 2023; 7:00 p.m., CBSSN	No. 22	at New Mexico	W 73–71	23–5 (14–2)	18 – Trammell	10 – Johnson	7 – Bradley	The Pit (15,431); Albuquerque, NM
February 28, 2023; 6:00 p.m., CBSSN	No. 18	at Boise State	L 60–66	23–6 (14–3)	16 – Bradley	6 – Bradley	2 – Tied	ExtraMile Arena (12,208); Boise, ID
March 4, 2023; 7:00 p.m., CBSSN	No. 18	Wyoming	W 67–50	24–6 (15–3)	21 – LeDee	8 – LeDee	6 – Butler	Viejas Arena (12,414); San Diego, CA
Mountain West tournament
March 9, 2023; 12:00 p.m., CBSSN	(1) No. 20	vs. (8) Colorado State; Quarterfinals	W 64–61	25–6	16 – Butler	8 – Tied	3 – LeDee	Thomas & Mack Center; Paradise, NV
March 10, 2023; 6:30 p.m., CBSSN	(1) No. 20	vs. (5) San Jose State; Semifinals	W 64–49	26–6	15 – Tied	8 – Mensah	4 – Butler	Thomas & Mack Center; Paradise, NV
March 11, 2023; 3:00 p.m., CBS/Paramount+	(1) No. 20	vs. (3) Utah State; Championship	W 62–57	27–6	16 – Bradley	10 – LeDee	3 – Butler	Thomas & Mack Center; Paradise, NV
NCAA tournament
March 16, 2023*; 12:25 p.m., TruTV	(5 S) No. 18	vs. (12 S) Charleston; First Round	W 63–57	28–6	17 – Bradley	10 – LeDee	5 – Butler	Amway Center (15,650); Orlando, FL
March 18, 2023*; 9:10 a.m., CBS	(5 S) No. 18	vs. (13 S) Furman; Second Round	W 75–52	29–6	16 – Parrish	9 – Mensah	6 – Butler	Amway Center (17,298); Orlando, FL
March 24, 2023*; 3:30 p.m., TBS	(5 S) No. 18	vs. (1 S) No. 1 Alabama; Sweet Sixteen	W 71–64	30–6	21 – Trammell	8 – Tied	4 – Butler	KFC Yum! Center (20,289); Louisville, KY
March 26, 2023*; 11:20 a.m., CBS	(5 S) No. 18	vs. (6 S) Creighton; Elite Eight	W 57–56	31–6	18 – Butler	6 – Tied	2 – Tied	KFC Yum! Center (20,051); Louisville, KY
April 1, 2023*; 3:09 p.m., CBS	(5 S) No. 18	vs. (9 E) No. 25 Florida Atlantic; Final Four	W 72–71	32–6	21 – Bradley	6 – Tied	3 – Butler	NRG Stadium (73,860); Houston, TX
April 3, 2023*; 6:20 p.m., CBS	(5 S) No. 18	vs. (4 W) No. 10 UConn; National Championship	L 59–76	32–7	14 – Johnson	6 – Mensah	2 – Butler	NRG Stadium (72,423); Houston, TX
*Non-conference game. ^{#}Rankings from AP Poll. (#) Tournament seedings in parentheses. S=South. E=East. W=West. All times are in Pacific Time.

== Rankings ==
Ranking movements Legend: ██ Increase in ranking ██ Decrease in ranking RV = Received votes
	Week																		
Poll	Pre	1	2	3	4	5	6	7	8	9	10	11	12	13	14	15	16	17	Final
AP	19	17	17	24	22	RV	RV	RV	RV	23	RV	22	25	21	22	18	20	18	Not released
Coaches	20	19	19	24	22	RV	RV	RV	RV	25	RV	RV	23	20	20	19	20	18	2

*AP does not release post-NCAA Tournament rankings.
