= 2022–23 Arizona Wildcats men's basketball team =

2022–23 Arizona Wildcats men's basketball

Pac-12 Tournament champions Maui Invitational champions

NCAA tournament, First Round
- Conference: Pac-12 Conference

Ranking
- Coaches: No. 17
- AP: No. 8
- Record: 28–7 (14–6 Pac-12)
- Head coach: Tommy Lloyd (2nd season)
- Associate head coach: Jack Murphy (4th season)
- Assistant coaches: Riccardo Fois (2nd season); Steve Robinson (2nd season)
- Home arena: McKale Center

2022–23 Pac-12 Conference men's basketball standings
	Conf.				Overall
Team	W		L	PCT	W		L	PCT
No. 7 UCLA	18	–	2	.900	31	–	6	.838
No. 8 Arizona†	14	–	6	.700	28	–	7	.800
USC	14	–	6	.700	22	–	11	.667
Oregon	12	–	8	.600	21	–	15	.583
Arizona State	11	–	9	.550	23	–	13	.639
Washington State	11	–	9	.550	17	–	17	.500
Utah	10	–	10	.500	17	–	15	.531
Washington	8	–	12	.400	16	–	16	.500
Colorado	8	–	12	.400	18	–	17	.514
Stanford	7	–	13	.350	14	–	19	.424
Oregon State	5	–	15	.250	11	–	21	.344
California	2	–	18	.100	3	–	29	.094
† Conference tournament winner Rankings from AP poll

The 2022–23 Arizona Wildcats men's basketball team represented the University of Arizona during the 2022–23 NCAA Division I men's basketball season. The team led by Tommy Lloyd, in his 2nd season as a head coach. This is the Wildcats' 49th season at the on-campus McKale Center in Tucson, Arizona and 44th season as a member of the Pac-12 Conference. They finished the season 28–7, 14–6 in Pac-12 Play to finish a tie in 2nd place. They defeated Stanford, Arizona State, and UCLA to become champions of the Pac-12 Tournament. They received an automatic bid to the NCAA Tournament where they were upset in the First Round by Princeton, becoming the 11th No. 2 seed to lose to a No. 15 seed.

== Previous season ==
In Lloyd's inaugural season, The Wildcats finished the 2021–22 season at 33–4. During the regular season, Arizona finished with a record of 28–3, 18–2 in conference play to win their 17th regular season title. and 11–0 in non-conference play. Arizona went 17–0 at home, 8–3 on the road, and 2–0 at neutral sites.

Arizona defeated 1-seed UCLA 84–76 in the PAC-12 Tournament title game to win their 8th conference tournament title in Paradise, Nevada. In the NCAA Tournament, the #1 seed Wildcats lost to the #5 seed Houston 72–60.

== Offseason ==
=== Returning players ===
Arizona Returners
Name	Number	Pos.	Height	Weight	Year	Hometown
Ąžuolas Tubelis	10	F	6’11”	245 lbs	Junior	Vilnius, Lithuania
Kerr Kriisa	25	G	6’3”	180 lbs	Junior	Tartu, Estonia
Pelle Larsson	3	G	6’5”	215 lbs	Junior	Nacka, Sweden
Oumar Ballo	11	C	7’0”	260 lbs	(redshirt) Junior	Koulikoro, Mali
Adama Bal	2	G	6’6”	190 lbs	Sophomore	Le Mans, France
Jordan Mains	50	F	6’6”	200 lbs	Senior	Scottsdale, AZ
Tautvilas Tubelis	20	F	6’7”	220 lbs	Junior	Vilnius, Lithuania

=== Departures ===
Due to COVID-19, the NCAA ruled in October 2020 that the 2020–21 season would not count against the eligibility of any basketball player, thus giving all players the option to return in 2021–22. Additionally, any players who have declared for the 2022 NBA draft—including seniors, who must opt into this year's draft—have the option to return if they make a timely withdrawal from the draft and end any pre-draft relationships with agents. Thus, separate lists will initially be maintained for confirmed and potential departures.

Arizona Wildcats Departures
Name	Number	Pos.	Height	Weight	Year	Hometown	Notes
Bennedict Mathurin	0	G	6'6"	210	Sophomore	Montreal, QC	Declared for 2022 NBA draft
Shane Nowell	1	G	6'6"	210	Freshman	Seattle, WA	Elected to transfer to UNLV
Dalen Terry	4	G	6'7"	195	Sophomore	Phoenix, AZ	Declared for 2022 NBA draft
Justin Kier	5	G	6'4"	195	Graduate Student	Grottoes, VA	Completed college eligibility
Kim Aiken Jr.	24	F	6'7"	245	(redshirt) Senior	Redlands, CA	Elected to transfer to New Mexico State
Christian Koloko	35	C	7'1"	230	Junior	Douala, Cameroon	Declared for 2022 NBA draft
Will Reeves	55	G	6'3"	195	Freshman	Spokane, WA	Walk-on; Elected to transfer

==== Coaching staff departures ====
Arizona Coaching Changes
Name	Alma Mater	Previous position	New position
Ryan Anderson	Arizona (2016)	Graduate assistant	Xavier (director of player development/recruiting)

=== Acquisitions ===
==== Incoming transfers ====
Arizona incoming transfers
Name	Number	Pos.	Height/Weight	Year	Hometown	Previous School	Years Remaining	Date Eligible	Source
Courtney Ramey	#3	G	6’3”, 185 lbs	Senior	St. Louis, MO	Transferred from Texas	1	June 10, 2022	
Luke Champion	#21	F	6'8”, 205 lbs	Sophomore	Suwanee, GA	Walk-on, Transferred from Missouri Western State	2	May 17, 2022	
Matthew Lang	#23	G	6'3”, 185 lbs	Senior	Portland, OR	Walk-on, Transferred from Gonzaga	1	June 21, 2022	
Cedric Henderson Jr.	#45	G	6'6”, 190 lbs	Senior	Memphis, TN	Transferred from Campbell	1	June 9, 2022	
Luc Krystkowiak	#24	G	6'4”, 200 lbs	(redshirt) Sophomore	Salt Lake City, UT	Transferred from Irvine Valley College	3	July 6, 2022	

==== 2022 recruiting class ====
College recruiting
Name	Hometown	School	Height	Weight	Commit date
Kylan Boswell*; PG	Champaign, IL	AZ Compass Prep (AZ)	6 ft 2 in (1.88 m)	190 lb (86 kg)	Feb 28, 2022
Kylan Boswell*; PG	Recruit ratings: Rivals: 247Sports: ESPN: (90)				
Dylan Anderson; C	Gilbert, AZ	Perry High School	6 ft 11 in (2.11 m)	215 lb (98 kg)	Apr 16, 2021
Dylan Anderson; C	Recruit ratings: Rivals: 247Sports: ESPN: (82)				
Filip Borovićanin; G	Belgrade, Serbia	KK Beko	6 ft 8 in (2.03 m)	200 lb (91 kg)	Apr 19, 2022
Filip Borovićanin; G	Recruit ratings: No ratings found				
Henri Veesaar; F	Tallinn, Estonia	Real Madrid	6 ft 11 in (2.11 m)	200 lb (91 kg)	May 20, 2022
Henri Veesaar; F	Recruit ratings: 247Sports:				
Overall recruit ranking: Rivals: 10 247Sports: 10 ESPN: 10
Note: In many cases, Scout, Rivals, 247Sports, On3, and ESPN may conflict in their listings of height and weight.; In these cases, the average was taken. ESPN grades are on a 100-point scale.; Sources: "Arizona 2022 Basketball Commitments". Rivals.; "2022 Arizona Wildcats Recruiting Class". ESPN.; "2022 Team Ranking". Rivals.; "2022 Arizona 24/7 Sports Commits". 247Sports.

*Originally class of 2023, but reclassified to 2022.

==== 2023 recruiting class ====
College recruiting (2023)
Name	Hometown	School	Height	Weight	Commit date
KJ Lewis; SG	El Paso, TX	Duncanville High School	6 ft 4 in (1.93 m)	185 lb (84 kg)	Mar 9, 2022
KJ Lewis; SG	Recruit ratings: Rivals: 247Sports: ESPN: (85)				
Overall recruit ranking:
Note: In many cases, Scout, Rivals, 247Sports, On3, and ESPN may conflict in their listings of height and weight.; In these cases, the average was taken. ESPN grades are on a 100-point scale.; Sources: "Arizona 2023 Basketball Commitments". Rivals.; "2023 Arizona Wildcats Recruiting Class". ESPN.; "2023 Team Ranking". Rivals.; "2023 Arizona 24/7 Sports Commits". 247Sports.

==== Coaching staff additions ====
Arizona Coaching Changes
Name	Alma Mater	Previous position	New position
Austin Torres	Arizona	TBD	Graduate assistant
Przemek Karnowski	Gonzaga	TBD	Graduate assistant
Ben Lathwell	Gonzaga	Athletics Videographer	Graduate Assistant (Director of Branding & Creative)

=== Entered 2022 NBA draft ===
Player	Position
Bennedict Mathurin	G
Dalen Terry	G
Christian Koloko	C

== Preseason ==
=== Preseason rankings ===
- October 26 – Pac-12 Men's Basketball Media Day in San Francisco. Arizona was picked to finish 2nd by the Pac-12 Media Day.
- Arizona was ranked 17th in the AP poll. and ranked 13th in the Coaches poll

Pac-12 media poll
Predicted finish	Team	Votes (1st place)
1.	UCLA	386 (26)
2.	Arizona	352 (3)
3.	Oregon	336 (3)
4.	USC	300
5.	Stanford	239 (1)
6.	Colorado	207
7.	Arizona State	193
8.	Washington State	185
9.	Washington	158
10.	Utah	102
11.	California	69
12.	Oregon State	47

=== Preseason All-conference teams ===
Award	Player	Position	Year
Preseason All Pac-12 team (1st)	Ąžuolas Tubelis	F	Jr.
Preseason All Pac-12 team (2nd)	Kerr Kriisa	G	Jr.
Preseason All Pac-12 team (2nd)	Pelle Larsson	G	Jr.
Preseason All Pac-12 team (HM)	Oumar Ballo	C	RS Jr.

=== Award watch lists ===
Listed in the order that they were released

Award	Player	Position	Year	Source
Bob Cousy Award	Kerr Kriisa	PG	Junior	
Julius Erving Award	Pelle Larsson	SF	Junior	
Karl Malone Award	Ąžuolas Tubelis	PF	Junior	
Naismith Trophy	Ąžuolas Tubelis	PF	Junior	
Wooden Award	Ąžuolas Tubelis	PF	Junior	
Lute Olsen Award	Ąžuolas Tubelis	PF	Junior	
Kareem Abdul-Jabbar Award	Oumar Ballo	C	RS Junior	

=== Red and Blue game ===
The annual Red-Blue game took place at McKale Center on Friday September 30, 2022 at 7:30 p.m. The Red team consisted of Ben Ackerley, Dylan Anderson, Filip Borovićanin, Kylan Boswell, Luke Champion, Luc Krystkowiak, Matthew Lang, Pelle Larsson, Jordan Mains, Courtney Ramey & Azuolas Tubelis. The Blue team consisted of Adama Bal, Oumar Ballo, Cedric Henderson Jr., Kerr Kriisa, Will Menaugh, Tautvilas Tubelis, Henri Veesaar and Grant Weitman. The blue team won 49–45 with Oumar Ballo and Henri Veesaar leading all scorers with 16 points each.

== Personnel ==
=== Roster ===
Note: Players' year is based on remaining eligibility. The NCAA did not count the 2020–21 season towards eligibility.

2022–23 Arizona Wildcats men's basketball team
Players
Coaches

Pos.	#	Name	Height	Weight	Year	Previous school	Hometown
G	0	Courtney Ramey	6 ft 3 in (1.91 m)	185 lb (84 kg)	GS	Texas	St. Louis, MO
F	1	Filip Borovićanin	6 ft 9 in (2.06 m)	185 lb (84 kg)	Fr	KK Beko	Belgrade, Serbia
G	2	Adama Bal	6 ft 7 in (2.01 m)	190 lb (86 kg)	So	INSEP Paris	Le Mans, France
G	3	Pelle Larsson	6 ft 5 in (1.96 m)	215 lb (98 kg)	Jr	Utah	Nacka, Sweden
G	4	Kylan Boswell	6 ft 2 in (1.88 m)	195 lb (88 kg)	Fr	AZ Compass Prep	Champaign, IL
F	10	Ąžuolas Tubelis	6 ft 11 in (2.11 m)	245 lb (111 kg)	Jr	Rytas Vilnius	Vilnius, Lithuania
C	11	Oumar Ballo	7 ft 0 in (2.13 m)	260 lb (118 kg)	RS Jr	Gonzaga	Koulikoro, Mali
F	13	Henri Veesaar	7 ft 0 in (2.13 m)	200 lb (91 kg)	Fr	Real Madrid	Tallinn, Estonia
G	15	Grant Weitman (W)	6 ft 4 in (1.93 m)	205 lb (93 kg)	Jr	Salpointe Catholic HS	Tucson, AZ
F	20	Tautvilas Tubelis	6 ft 7 in (2.01 m)	220 lb (100 kg)	Jr	Rytas Vilnius	Vilnius, Lithuania
G	21	Ben Ackerley (W)	6 ft 1 in (1.85 m)	170 lb (77 kg)	So	Eastside Prep	Seattle, WA
F	22	Jordan Mains (W)	6 ft 6 in (1.98 m)	200 lb (91 kg)	Sr	Pinnacle HS	Scottsdale, AZ
G	23	Matthew Lang (W)	6 ft 3 in (1.91 m)	185 lb (84 kg)	GS	Gonzaga	Portland, OR
F	24	Luke Champion (W)	6 ft 8 in (2.03 m)	205 lb (93 kg)	Jr	Missouri Western State	Suwanee, GA
G	25	Kerr Kriisa	6 ft 3 in (1.91 m)	190 lb (86 kg)	Jr	Žalgiris	Tartu, Estonia
F	33	Will Menaugh (W)	6 ft 10 in (2.08 m)	245 lb (111 kg)	So	Catalina Foothills HS	Tucson, AZ
G	42	Luc Krystkowiak (W)	6 ft 4 in (1.93 m)	195 lb (88 kg)	RS So	Irvine Valley College	Salt Lake City, UT
F	44	Dylan Anderson	7 ft 0 in (2.13 m)	240 lb (109 kg)	Fr	Perry HS	Gilbert, AZ
G	45	Cedric Henderson Jr.	6 ft 6 in (1.98 m)	200 lb (91 kg)	GS	Campbell	Memphis, TN

Head coach

- Tommy Lloyd (Whitman)

Assistant coach(es)

- Jack Murphy (Arizona)
- Riccardo Fois (Pepperdine)
- Steve Robinson (Radford)

Legend

- (C) Team captain
- (S) Suspended
- (I) Ineligible
- (W) Walk-on
- Injured
- Current redshirt

Roster

- On October 31 Courtney Ramey was suspended for three-games by the NCAA as a result of playing in the Portsmouth Invitational.

=== Depth chart ===
Pos.	Starting 5	Bench 1	Bench 2	Bench 3
C	Oumar Ballo
PF	Ąžuolas Tubelis		Tautvilas Tubelis
SF	Pelle Larsson	Cedric Henderson Jr.	Adama Bal
SG	Courtney Ramey		Grant Weitman	Jordan Mains
PG	Kerr Kriisa	Kylan Boswell	Ben Ackerley

== Schedule ==
Date time, TV	Rank^{#}	Opponent^{#}	Result	Record	High points	High rebounds	High assists	Site (attendance) city, state
Exhibition
November 1, 2022*; 7:00 p.m., P12N	No. 17	Western Oregon	W 91–61		19 – A. Tubelis	11 – O. Ballo	4 – Tied	McKale Center (12,563); Tucson, AZ
Regular season
November 7, 2022*; 7:30 p.m., P12N	No. 17	Nicholls	W 117–75	1–0	23 – A. Tubelis	10 – P. Larsson	7 – K. Kriisa	McKale Center (12,635); Tucson, AZ
November 11, 2022*; 7:00 p.m., P12N	No. 17	Southern; Pac-12/SWAC Legacy Series	W 95–78	2–0	17 – Tied	11 – K. Kriisa	12 – K. Kriisa	McKale Center (13,485); Tucson, AZ
November 17, 2022*; 7:00 p.m., P12N	No. 14	Utah Tech	W 104–77	3–0	24 – K. Kriisa	11 – O. Ballo	6 – P. Larsson	McKale Center (12,752); Tucson, AZ
November 21, 2022*; 9:30 p.m., ESPN2	No. 14	vs. Cincinnati; Maui Invitational quarterfinals	W 101–93	4–0	30 – A. Tubelis	11 – A. Tubelis	7 – K. Kriisa	Lahaina Civic Center (2,400); Lahaina, HI
November 22, 2022*; 8:30 p.m., ESPN	No. 14	vs. No. 17 San Diego State; Maui Invitational semifinals	W 87–70	5–0	21 – Tied	9 – O. Ballo	5 – K. Kriisa	Lahaina Civic Center (2,400); Lahaina, HI
November 23, 2022*; 3:00 p.m., ESPN	No. 14	vs. No. 10 Creighton; Maui Invitational championship	W 81–79	6–0	30 – O. Ballo	13 – O. Ballo	9 – K. Kriisa	Lahaina Civic Center (2,400); Lahaina, HI
December 1, 2022; 6:30 p.m., P12N	No. 4	at Utah	L 66–81	6–1 (0–1)	22 – O. Ballo	11 – P. Larsson	8 – K. Kriisa	Jon M. Huntsman Center (6,495); Salt Lake City, UT
December 4, 2022; 3:00 p.m., P12N	No. 4	California	W 81–68	7–1 (1–1)	23 – A. Tubelis	12 – A. Tubelis	8 – K. Kriisa	McKale Center (14,352); Tucson, AZ
December 10, 2022*; 5:30 p.m., FOX	No. 10	vs. No. 14 Indiana; Las Vegas Clash	W 89–75	8–1	21 – A. Tubelis	12 – O. Ballo	7 – K. Kriisa	MGM Grand Garden Arena (13,357); Las Vegas, NV
December 13, 2022*; 6:30 p.m., P12N	No. 9	Texas A&M–Corpus Christi	W 99–61	9–1	20 – A. Tubelis	13 – A. Tubelis	8 – K. Boswell	McKale Center (13,854); Tucson, AZ
December 17, 2022*; 8:30 p.m., ESPN2	No. 9	No. 6 Tennessee	W 75–70	10–1	19 – A. Tubelis	9 – A. Tubelis	5 – K. Kriisa	McKale Center (14,688); Tucson, AZ
December 20, 2022*; 6:30 p.m., P12N	No. 5	Montana State	W 85–64	11–1	18 – K. Kriisa	10 – O. Ballo	5 – P. Larsson	McKale Center (13,606); Tucson, AZ
December 22, 2022*; 6:00 p.m., P12N	No. 5	Morgan State	W 93–68	12–1	26 – A. Tubelis	9 – A. Tubelis	7 – C. Ramey	McKale Center (14,021); Tucson, AZ
December 31, 2022; 12:00 p.m., FOX	No. 5	at Arizona State; Rivalry	W 69–60	13–1 (2–1)	21 – A. Tubelis	12 – O. Ballo	6 – C. Ramey	Desert Financial Arena (12,582); Tempe, AZ
January 5, 2023; 9:00 p.m., FS1	No. 5	Washington	W 70–67	14–1 (3–1)	18 – A. Tubelis	10 – A. Tubelis	6 – K. Boswell	McKale Center (13,562); Tucson, AZ
January 7, 2023; 3:00 p.m., P12N	No. 5	Washington State	L 61–74	14–2 (3–2)	29 – A. Tubelis	14 – A. Tubelis	3 – Tied	McKale Center (14,176); Tucson, AZ
January 12, 2023; 9:00 p.m., ESPN2	No. 9	at Oregon State	W 86–74	15–2 (4–2)	25 – A. Tubelis	14 – O. Ballo	11 – K. Kriisa	Gill Coliseum (4,126); Corvallis, OR
January 14, 2023; 4:00 p.m., ESPN	No. 9	at Oregon	L 68–87	15–3 (4–3)	15 – K. Boswell	7 – O. Ballo	4 – Tied	Matthew Knight Arena (7,970); Eugene, OR
January 19, 2023; 7:00 p.m., P12N	No. 11	USC	W 81–66	16–3 (5–3)	16 – C. Ramey	17 – A. Tubelis	8 – K. Kriisa	McKale Center (14,688); Tucson, AZ
January 21, 2023; 12:00 p.m., ABC	No. 11	No. 5 UCLA; Rivalry	W 58–52	17–3 (6–3)	16 – O. Ballo	10 – A. Tubelis	3 – P. Larsson	McKale Center (14,688); Tucson, AZ
January 26, 2023; 9:00 p.m., FS1	No. 6	at Washington State	W 63–58	18–3 (7–3)	18 – A. Tubelis	12 – A. Tubelis	3 – Tied	Beasley Coliseum (5,225); Pullman, WA
January 28, 2023; 3:30 p.m., FOX	No. 6	at Washington	W 95–72	19–3 (8–3)	25 – A. Tubelis	12 – O. Ballo	6 – Tied	Alaska Airlines Arena (9,268); Seattle, WA
February 2, 2023; 8:30 p.m., ESPN	No. 5	Oregon	W 91–76	20–3 (9–3)	40 – A. Tubelis	11 – O. Ballo	7 – K. Kriisa	McKale Center (14,688); Tucson, AZ
February 4, 2023; 7:30 p.m., P12N	No. 5	Oregon State	W 84–52	21–3 (10–3)	19 – A. Tubelis	8 – A. Tubelis	6 – K. Kriisa	McKale Center (14,688); Tucson, AZ
February 9, 2023; 9:00 p.m., P12N	No. 4	at California	W 85–62	22–3 (11–3)	23 – A. Tubelis	14 – A. Tubelis	8 – K. Kriisa	Haas Pavilion (3,289); Berkeley, CA
February 11, 2023; 6:00 p.m., ESPN2	No. 4	at Stanford	L 79–88	22–4 (11–4)	26 – C. Ramey	6 – Tied	5 – C. Ramey	Maples Pavilion (5,313); Stanford, CA
February 16, 2023; 8:00 p.m., P12N	No. 8	Utah	W 88–62	23–4 (12–4)	17 – K. Kriisa	9 – A. Tubelis	6 – Tied	McKale Center (14,688); Tucson, AZ
February 18, 2023; 6:00 p.m., ESPN2	No. 8	Colorado	W 78–68	24–4 (13–4)	18 – O. Ballo	16 – O. Ballo	5 – Tied	McKale Center (14,688); Tucson, AZ
February 25, 2023; 12:00 p.m., CBS	No. 7	Arizona State; Rivalry	L 88–89	24–5 (13–5)	19 – C. Henderson Jr	9 – A. Tubelis	5 – K. Kriisa	McKale Center (14,688); Tucson, AZ
March 2, 2023; 9:00 p.m., ESPN	No. 8	at USC	W 87–81	25–5 (14–5)	25 – A. Tubelis	10 – A. Tubelis	4 – Tied	Galen Center (7,043); Los Angeles, CA
March 4, 2023; 8:00 p.m., ESPN	No. 8	at No. 4 UCLA; Rivalry	L 73–82	25–6 (14–6)	24 – A. Tubelis	10 – A. Tubelis	4 – K. Kriisa	Pauley Pavilion (13,659); Los Angeles, CA
Pac-12 Tournament
March 9, 2023; 7:00 p.m., P12N	(2) No. 8	vs. (10) Stanford; Quarterfinals	W 95–84	26–6	24 – O. Ballo	8 – A. Tubelis	5 – P. Larsson	T-Mobile Arena (11,226); Paradise, NV
March 10, 2023; 9:30 p.m., ESPN	(2) No. 8	vs. (6) Arizona State; Semifinals/Rivalry	W 78–59	27–6	17 – A. Tubelis	10 – O. Ballo	7 – K. Kriisa	T-Mobile Arena (13,788); Paradise, NV
March 11, 2023; 8:30 p.m., ESPN	(2) No. 8	vs. (1) No. 2 UCLA; Championship/Rivalry	W 61–59	28–6	19 – A. Tubelis	14 – A. Tubelis	5 – P. Larsson	T-Mobile Arena (14,022); Paradise, NV
NCAA tournament
March 16, 2023; 1:10 pm, TNT	(2 S) No. 8	vs. (15 S) Princeton; First Round	L 55–59	28–7	22 – A. Tubelis	12 – O. Ballo	3 – C. Ramey	Golden 1 Center (14,896); Sacramento, CA
*Non-conference game. ^{#}Rankings from AP Poll. (#) Tournament seedings in parentheses. S=South. All times are in Mountain Time.

== Game summaries ==
This section will be filled in as the season progresses.

=== Western Oregon (exhibition) ===
P12N

Nov. 1
7:00 p.m.

Western Oregon Wolves 61, No. 17 Arizona Wildcats 91
Scoring by half: 33-48, 29-43
Pts: Cameron Cranston, 20; Rebs: Cameron Cranston, 6 Asts: Daisone Hughes, 4	Pts: Ąžuolas Tubelis, 19; Rebs: Oumar Ballo, 11; Asts: 2 tied, 4

McKale Center, Tucson, AZ
Attendance: 12,563
Referees: Eric Curry, Shawn Lehigh, Marcus Hicks

=== Nicholls ===
P12N

Nov. 7
7:30 p.m.

Nicholls Colonels 75, No. 17 Arizona Wildcats 117
Scoring by half: 37-59, 38-58
Pts: Micah Thomas, 20; Rebs: Manny Littles, 7 Asts: 2 tied, 3	Pts: Ąžuolas Tubelis, 23; Rebs: Pelle Larsson, 10; Asts: Kerr Kriisa, 7

McKale Center, Tucson, AZ
Attendance: 12,635
Referees: Mike Littlewood, Jeff Wooten, Jon Stigliano

=== Southern ===
P12N

Nov. 11
7:00 p.m.

Southern Jaguars 78, No. 17 Arizona Wildcats 95
Scoring by half: 30-49, 48-46
Pts: Bryson Etienne, 17; Rebs: Jalen Reynolds, 4 Asts: Bryson Etienne, 3	Pts: 3 tied , 17; Rebs: Kerr Kriisa, 11; Asts: Kerr Kriisa, 12

McKale Center, Tucson, AZ
Attendance: 13,485
Referees: Michael Irving, Frank Harvey III, Marc Beasley

=== Utah Tech ===
P12N

Nov. 17
7:00 p.m.

Utah Tech Trailblazers 77, No. 14 Arizona Wildcats 104
Scoring by half: 21-49, 56-55
Pts: Noa Gonsalves, 13; Rebs: Dancell Leter, 5 Asts: 3 tied, 3	Pts: Kerr Kriisa, 24; Rebs: Oumar Ballo, 11; Asts: Pelle Larson, 6

McKale Center, Tucson, AZ
Attendance: 12,752
Referees: Greg Nixon, Eric Curry, Amy Bonner

=== Cincinnati ===
ESPN2

Nov. 21
9:30 p.m.

Cincinnati Bearcats 93, No. 14 Arizona Wildcats 101
Scoring by half: 30-40, 63-61
Pts: Landers Nolley II, 33; Rebs: 2 tied, 5 Asts: David DeJulius, 5	Pts: Ąžuolas Tubelis, 30; Rebs: Ąžuolas Tubelis, 11; Asts: Kerr Kriisa, 7

Lahaina Civic Center, Lahaina, HI
Attendance: 2,400
Referees: Randy Richardson, Brent Hampton, Terry Oglesby

=== No. 17 San Diego State ===
ESPN

Nov. 22
8:30 p.m.

No. 17 San Diego State Aztecs 70, No. 14 Arizona Wildcats 87
Scoring by half: 33-37, 37-50
Pts: Darrion Trammel, 21; Rebs: Nathan Mensah, 7 Asts: Darrion Trammel, 2	Pts: 2 tied, 21; Rebs: Oumar Ballo, 9 Asts: Kerr Kriisa, 5

Lahaina Civic Center, Lahaina, HI
Attendance: 2,400
Referees: Jeb Hartness, Rob Riley, Jeff Clark

=== No. 10 Creighton ===
ESPN

Nov. 23
3:00 p.m.

No. 10 Creighton Bluejays 79, No. 14 Arizona Wildcats 81
Scoring by half: 30-39, 49-42
Pts: Ryan Nembhard, 20; Rebs: Baylor Scheierman, 11; Asts: Ryan Nembhard, 6	Pts: Oumar Ballo, 30; Rebs: Oumar Ballo, 13; Asts: Kerr Kriisa, 9

Lahaina Civic Center, Lahaina, HI
Attendance: 2,400
Referees: Verne Harris, Lee Cassell, Brent Hampton

=== at Utah ===
P12N

Dec. 1
6:30 p.m.

No. 4 Arizona Wildcats 66, Utah Utes 81
Scoring by half: 25-42, 39-39
Pts: Oumar Ballo, 22; Rebs: Pelle Larsson, 11; Asts: Kerr Kriisa, 8	Pts: Branden Carlson, 22; Rebs: 2 tied, 11; Asts: Rollie Worster, 9

Jon M. Huntsman Center, Salt Lake City, UT
Attendance: 6,495
Referees: Tony Padilla, Deldre Carr, Eric Curry

=== California ===
P12N

Dec. 4
3:00 p.m.

California Golden Bears 68, No. 4 Arizona Wildcats 81
Scoring by half: 33-42, 35-39
Pts: Devin Askew, 25; Rebs: 2 tied, 5 Asts: 2 tied, 3	Pts: Ąžuolas Tubelis, 23; Rebs: Ąžuolas Tubelis, 12; Asts: Kerr Kriisa, 7

McKale Center, Tucson, AZ
Attendance: 14,352
Referees: Mike Reed, John Higgins, Mike Scyphers

=== vs Indiana ===
FOX

Dec. 10
5:30 p.m.

No. 14 Indiana Hoosiers 75, No. 10 Arizona Wildcats 89
Scoring by half: 36–46, 39–43
Pts: Race Thompson, 16; Rebs: Race Thompson, 9 Asts: X. Johnson, 11	Pts: Ąžuolas Tubelis, 21; Rebs: Oumar Ballo, 12; Asts: Kerr Kriisa, 7

MGM Grand Garden Arena, Las Vegas, NV
Attendance: 13,357
Referees: Eric Curry, Deldre Carr, Kevin Brill

=== Texas A&M–Corpus Christi ===
P12N

Dec. 13
6:30 p.m.

Texas A&M–Corpus Christi Islanders 61, No. 9 Arizona Wildcats 99
Scoring by half: 34–47, 27–52
Pts: Simeon Fryer, 12; Rebs: 3 tied, 7 Asts: Jalen Jackson, 3	Pts: Ąžuolas Tubelis, 20; Rebs: Ąžuolas Tubelis, 13; Asts: Kylan Boswell, 8

McKale Center, Tucson, AZ
Attendance: 13,854
Referees: Michael Irving, Marc Beasley, Daryl Gelinas

=== Tennessee ===
ESPN2

Dec. 17
8:30 p.m.

No. 6 Tennessee Volunteers 70, No. 9 Arizona Wildcats 75
Scoring by half: 35–35, 35–40
Pts: Zakai Ziegler, 21; Rebs: 2 tied, 6 Asts: 2 tied, 5	Pts: Ąžuolas Tubelis, 19; Rebs: Ąžuolas Tubelis, 9 Asts: Kerr Kriisa, 5

McKale Center, Tucson, AZ
Attendance: 14,688
Referees: John Higgins, Verne Harris, Tony Padilla

=== Montana State ===
P12N

Dec. 20
6:30 p.m.

Montana State Bobcats 64, No. 5 Arizona Wildcats 85
Scoring by half: 37–44, 28–41
Pts: Jubrile Belo, 18; Rebs: Jubrile Belo, 6 Asts: Darius Brown, 5	Pts: Kerr Kriisa, 18; Rebs: Oumar Ballo, 10; Asts: Pelle Larsson, 5

McKale Center, Tucson, AZ
Attendance: 13,606
Referees: Randy McCall, Bill Vinovich, Chad Shepherd

=== Morgan State ===
P12N

Dec. 22
6:00 p.m.

Morgan State Bears 68, No. 5 Arizona Wildcats 93
Scoring by half: 32-41, 36-52
Pts: Malik Miller, 23; Rebs: Khalil Turner,5; Asts: Isaiah Burke, 5	Pts: Ąžuolas Tubelis, 26; Rebs: Ąžuolas Tubelis, 9 Asts: Courtney Ramey, 7

McKale Center, Tucson, AZ
Attendance: 14,021
Referees: Frank Harvey III, Janetta Graham, Glen Mayberry

=== at Arizona State ===
FOX

Dec. 31, 2022
12:00 p.m.

No. 5 Arizona Wildcats 69, Arizona State Sun Devils 60
Scoring by half: 45-28, 24-32
Pts: Ąžuolas Tubelis, 21; Rebs: Oumar Ballo, 12; Asts: Courtney Ramey, 6	Pts: Frankie Collins, 12; Rebs: Warren Washington, 7 Asts: Frankie Collins, 6

Desert Financial Arena, Tempe, AZ
Attendance: 12,582
Referees: Mike Scyphers, Mike Reed, Randy McCall

=== Washington ===
FS1

Jan. 5, 2023
9:00 p.m.

Washington Huskies 67, No. 5 Arizona Wildcats 70
Scoring by half: 42-41, 25-29
Pts: 2 tied, 16; Rebs: 2 tied, 9 Asts: Noah Williams, 4	Pts: Ąžuolas Tubelis, 18; Rebs: Ąžuolas Tubelis, 10; Asts: Kylan Boswell, 6

McKale Center, Tucson, AZ
Attendance: 13,562
Referees: Michael Irving, Nate Harris, D.G. Nelson

=== Washington State ===
P12N

Jan. 7, 2023
3:00 p.m.

Washington State Cougars 74, No. 5 Arizona Wildcats 61
Scoring by half: 37-27, 37-34
Pts: Mouhamed Gueye, 24; Rebs: Mouhamed Gaye, 14; Asts: Tied, 3	Pts: Ąžuolas Tubelis, 29; Rebs: Ąžuolas Tubelis, 13; Asts: Tied, 3

McKale Center, Tucson, AZ
Attendance: 14,176
Referees: Casey McClellan, Glen Mayberry, Tony Padilla

=== at Oregon State ===
ESPN2

Jan. 12, 2023
9:00 p.m.

No. 9 Arizona Wildcats 86, Oregon State Beavers 74
Scoring by half: 44-26, 42-48
Pts: Ąžuolas Tubelis, 25; Rebs: Oumar Ballo, 14; Asts: Kerr Kriisa, 11	Pts: Tyler Bilodeau, 18; Rebs: Tyler Bilodeau, 6 Asts: 2 tied, 4

Gill Coliseum, Corvallis, OR
Attendance: 4,126
Referees: Verne Harris, Gregory Nixon, Deron White

=== at Oregon ===
ESPN

Jan. 14, 2023
4:00 p.m.

No. 9 Arizona Wildcats 68, Oregon Ducks 87
Scoring by half: 37-43, 31-44
Pts: Kylan Boswell, 15; Rebs: Oumar Ballo, 7 Asts: Tied, 4	Pts: Jermaine Couisnard, 27; Rebs: N’Faly Dante, 10; Asts: Will Richardson, 5

Matthew Knight Arena, Eugene, OR
Attendance: 7,970
Referees: Michael Irving, Mike Littlewood, Kevin Brill

=== USC ===
P12N

Jan. 19, 2023
7:00 p.m.

USC Trojans 66, No. 11 Arizona Wildcats 81
Scoring by half: 26–41, 40–40
Pts: Drew Peterson, 15; Rebs: 2 tied, 6 Asts: 2 tied, 2	Pts: Courtney Ramey, 16; Rebs: Ąžuolas Tubelis, 17; Asts: Kerr Kriisa, 8

McKale Center, Tucson, AZ
Attendance: 14,688
Referees: David Hall, Larry Spaulding, Kelly Pfeifer

=== No. 5 UCLA ===
ABC

Jan. 21, 2023
12:00 p.m.

No. 5 UCLA Bruins 52, No. 11 Arizona Wildcats 58
Scoring by half: 23–26, 29–32
Pts: Tyger Campbell, 13; Rebs: Jaime Jaquez Jr., 11; Asts: Tyger Campbell, 7	Pts: Oumar Ballo, 16; Rebs: Ąžuolas Tubelis, Asts: Pelle Larsson, 3

McKale Center, Tucson, AZ
Attendance: 14,688
Referees: Tony Padilla, Frank Harvey III, Michael Greenstein

=== at Washington State ===
FS1

Jan. 26, 2023
9:00 p.m.

No. 6 Arizona Wildcats 63, Washington State Cougars 58
Scoring by half: 36–32, 27–26
Pts: Ąžuolas Tubelis, 18; Rebs: Ąžuolas Tubelis, 12; Asts: Tied, 3	Pts: Tied, 15; Rebs: Mouhamed Gueye, 10; Asts: Justin Powell, 3

Beasley Coliseum, Pullman, WA
Attendance: 5,225
Referees: Mike Reed, Deron White, Tom Spitznagel

=== at Washington ===
FOX

Jan. 28, 2023
3:30 p.m.

No. 6 Arizona Wildcats 95, Washington Huskies 72
Scoring by half: 38–36, 57–36
Pts: Ąžuolas Tubelis, 25; Rebs: O. Ballo, 12; Asts: Tied, 6	Pts: Keion Brooks, 25; Rebs: Tied, 6 Asts: Keyon Menifield, 3

Alaska Airlines Arena, Seattle, WA
Attendance: 9,268
Referees: Eric Curry, Nate Harris, Kurt Walker

=== Oregon ===
ESPN

Feb. 2, 2023
8:30 p.m.

Oregon Ducks 76, No. 5 Arizona Wildcats 91
Scoring by half: 35–50, 41–41
Pts: Will Richardson, 22; Rebs: Quincy Guerrier, 6 Asts: Will Richardson, 5	Pts: Ąžuolas Tubelis, 40; Rebs: Oumar Ballo, 11; Asts: Kerr Kriisa, 7

McKale Center, Tucson, AZ
Attendance: 14,688
Referees: Verne Harris, Gerry Pollard, Shawn Lehigh

=== Oregon State ===
P12N

Feb. 4, 2023
7:30 p.m.

Oregon State Beavers 52, No. 5 Arizona Wildcats 84
Scoring by half: 21–47, 31–37
Pts: Ąžuolas Tubelis, 19; Rebs: Ąžuolas Tubelis, 8 Asts: Kerr Kriisa, 6	Pts: Jordan Pope, 11; Rebs: KC Ibekwe, 7 Asts: Michael Rataj, 2

McKale Center, Tucson, AZ
Attendance: 14,688
Referees: Greg Nixon, Jim Schipper, Casey McClellan

=== at California ===
P12N

Feb. 9, 2023
9:00 p.m.

No. 4 Arizona Wildcats 85, California Golden Bears 62
Scoring by half: 44–32, 41–30
Pts: Ąžuolas Tubelis, 23; Rebs: Ąžuolas Tubelis, 14; Asts: Kerr Kriisa, 8	Pts: Sam Alajiki, 12; Rebs: Lars Thiemann, 8 Asts: Joel Brown, 5

Haas Pavilion, Berkeley, CA
Attendance: 3,289
Referees: Tony Padilla, Mike Reed, Deldre Carr

=== at Stanford ===
ESPN2

Feb. 11, 2023
6:00 p.m.

No. 4 Arizona Wildcats 79, Stanford Cardinal 88
Scoring by half: 44–41, 35– 47
Pts: Courtney Ramey, 26; Rebs: Tied, 6 Asts: C. Ramey, 5	Pts: Michael O’Connell, 22; Rebs: Harrison Ingram, 9 Asts: Harrison Ingram, 7

Maples Pavilion, Stanford, CA
Attendance: 5,313
Referees: Mike Littlewood, Marques Pettigrew, DG Nelson

=== Utah ===
P12N

Feb. 16, 2023
8:00 p.m.

Utah Utes 62, No. 8 Arizona Wildcats 86
Scoring by half: 31–43, 31–45
Pts: Branden Carlson, 19; Rebs: Ben Carlson, 8 Asts: Rollie Worster, 4	Pts: Kerr Kriisa, 17; Rebs: Ąžuolas Tubelis, 9 Asts: Tied, 6

McKale Center, Tucson, AZ
Attendance: 14,688
Referees: Larry Scirotto, Larry Spaulding, Scott Brown

=== Colorado ===
ESPN2

Feb. 18, 2023
6:00 p.m.

Colorado Buffaloes 68, No. 8 Arizona Wildcats 78
Scoring by half: 34–46, 34–32
Pts: Tristan da Silva, 18; Rebs: Luke O’Brien, 9 Asts: K.J. Simpson, 7	Pts: Oumar Ballo, 18; Rebs: Oumar Ballo, 16; Asts: Tied, 5

McKale Center, Tucson, AZ
Attendance: 14,688
Referees: Frank Harvey III, Greg Nixon, Verne Harris

=== Arizona State ===
CBS

Feb. 25, 2023
12:00 p.m.

Arizona State Sun Devils 89, No. 7 Arizona Wildcats 88
Scoring by half: 46–45, 43–43
Pts: Desmond Cambridge Jr., 19; Rebs: Devan Cambridge, 6 Asts: DJ Horne, 7	Pts: Cedric Henderson Jr., 19; Rebs: Ąžuolas Tubelis, 9 Asts: Kerr Kriisa, 5

McKale Center, Tucson, AZ
Attendance: 14,688
Referees: Michael Greenstein, Deldre Carr, Dave Hall

=== at USC ===
ESPN

Mar. 2, 2023
9:00 p.m.

No. 8 Arizona Wildcats 87, USC Trojans 81
Scoring by half: 43–31, 44–50
Pts: Ąžuolas Tubelis, 25; Rebs: Ąžuolas Tubelis, 10; Asts: Tied, 4	Pts: Boogie Ellis, 35; Rebs: Joshua Morgan, 11; Asts: Kobe Johnson, 6

Galen Center, Los Angeles, CA
Attendance: 7,043
Referees: Tony Padilla, Mike Scyphers, Gregory Nixon

=== at No. 4 UCLA ===
ESPN

Mar. 4, 2023
8:00 p.m.

No. 8 Arizona Wildcats 73, No. 4 UCLA Bruins 82
Scoring by half: 37–40, 36–42
Pts: Ąžuolas Tubelis, 24; Rebs: Ąžuolas Tubelis, 10; Asts: Kerr Kriisa, 4	Pts: Jaime Jaquez Jr., 22; Rebs: Jaime Jaquez Jr., 10; Asts: Tyger Campbell, 4

Pauley Pavilion, Los Angeles, CA
Attendance: 13,659
Referees: Verne Harris, Eric Curry, Kelly Pfeifer

=== Stanford (Pac-12 Quarterfinal) ===
P12N

March 9
7:00 p.m.

No. 10 Stanford 84, No. 2 Arizona Wildcats 95
Scoring by half: 43−47, 41−48
Pts: Spencer Jones, 22; Rebs: Brandon Angel, 7 Asts: Harrison Ingram, 5	Pts: Oumar Ballo, 24; Rebs: Ąžuolas Tubelis, 8 Asts: Pelle Larson, 5

T-Mobile Arena, Las Vegas, NV
Attendance: 11,226
Referees: Mike Reed, Tony Padilla, Greg Nixon

=== Arizona State (Pac-12 Semifinal) ===
ESPN

March 10
8:30 p.m.

No. 6 Arizona State Sun Devils 59, No. 2 Arizona Wildcats 78
Scoring by half: 28−35, 41−43
Pts: Tied, 11; Rebs: Tied, 6 Asts: Frankie Collins, 7	Pts: Ąžuolas Tubelis, 17; Rebs: O. Ballo, 10; Asts: Kerr Kriisa, 7

T-Mobile Arena, Las Vegas, NV
Attendance: 13,788
Referees: Michael Greenstein, Deldre Carr, Deron White

=== No. 2 UCLA (Pac-12 Championship) ===
ESPN

March 11
8:30 p.m.

No. 1 UCLA Bruins 59, No. 2 Arizona Wildcats 61
Scoring by half: 34−33, 25−28
Pts: Amari Bailey, 19; Rebs: Jaime Jaquez Jr., 10; Asts: Tied, 2	Pts: Ąžuolas Tubelis, 19; Rebs: Ąžuolas Tubelis, 14; Asts: Pelle Larsson, 5

T-Mobile Arena, Las Vegas, NV
Attendance: 14,022
Referees: Verne Harris, Tony Padilla, Mike Reed

=== Princeton (round of 64) ===
TNT

March 16
1:10 p.m.

No. 15 Princeton Tigers 59, No. 2 Arizona Wildcats 55
Scoring by half: 30−31, 29−24
Pts: Tosan Evbuomwan, 15; Rebs: Tosan Evbuomwan, 7 Asts: Tosan Evbuomwan, 4	Pts: Ąžuolas Tubelis, 22; Rebs: Oumar Ballo, 12; Asts: Courtney Ramey, 3

Golden 1 Center, Sacramento, CA
Referees: Brian O'Connell, Kevin Brill, Rob Rorke

== Statistics ==
Updated through 2023 Season

=== Team total per game ===
Team	PTS	PPG	FGM-FGA	3PM-3PA	FTM-FTA	REB	AST	STL	TO	BLK	ATT	PPG
Wildcats	2,866	81.9	1,023–2,072 (49.4%)	295–781(37.8%)	525–742 (70.8%)	1,376	662	213	468	110	239,947	17–14,115
Opponents	2,490	71.1	905–2,216 (40.8%)	277–858(32.3%)	403–565 (71.3%)	1,163	443	276	431	122	−	−

=== Player statistics ===
			Minutes		Scoring		Total FGs		3-point FGs		Free-Throws		Rebounds			Miscellaneous				
Player	GP	GS	Tot	Avg	Pts	Avg	FGM-A	Pct	3FG-A	Pct	FT-A	Pct	Off-Def	Tot	Avg	AST	PF	TO	Stl	Blk
Benjamin Ackerley	4	0	5	1.3	0	0.0	0–2	0.0%	0–1	0.0%	0–0	0.0%	1–0	1	0.3	0	0	0	0	0
Dylan Anderson	15	0	56	3.7	21	1.4	7–17	41.2%	1–3	33.3%	6–8	75.0%	4–5	9	0.6	2	9	2	0	1
Adama Bal	26	0	213	8.2	64	2.5	20–51	39.02	12–34	35.3%	12–17	70.6%	5–21	26	1.0	14	17	13	7	1
Oumar Ballo	35	35	967	27.6	496	14.2	189–292	64.7%	0–0	0.0%	118–209	56.5%	80–222	302	8.6	56	79	65	25	45
Filip Borovićanin	14	0	54	3.9	18	1.4	7–13	53.8%	2–4	50.0%	2–3	66.7%	3–9	11	0.9	6	8	5	1	0
Kylan Boswell	35	0	536	15.3	161	4.6	58–129	45.0%	30–77	39.0%	15–19	78.9%	5–50	55	1.6	57	41	29	26	0
Luke Champion	0	0	0	0.0	0	0.0	0–0	0.0%	0–0	0.0%	0–0	0.0%	0–0	0	0.0	0	0	0	0	0
Cedric Henderson Jr.	35	20	810	23.1	283	8.1	102–221	46.2%	37–92	40.2%	42–55	76.4%	38–84	122	3.5	39	77	43	27	15
Kerr Kriisa	35	34	1085	31.0	347	9.9	109–293	37.2%	83–227	36.6%	46–60	76.7%	12–71	83	2.4	180	82	91	20	1
Luc Krystkowiak	2	0	4	2.0	4	2.0	1–1	100.0%	0–0	0.0%	2–2	100.0%	0–0	0	0.0	2	2	0	0	0
Matthew Lang	8	1	14	1.8	11	1.4	4–5	80.0%	3–4	75.0%	0–0	0.0%	2–2	4	0.5	2	2	0	0	0
Pelle Larsson	35	18	961	27.5	348	9.9	103–218	47.2%	31–87	35.6%	111–133	83.5%	32–119	151	4.3	107	79	61	28	8
Jordan Mains	8	1	17	2.1	6	0.8	3–6	50.0%	0–0	0.0%	0–0	0.0%	2–4	6	0.8	1	1	2	1	0
Will Menaugh	3	0	5	1.7	4	1.3	2–2	100%	0–0	0.0%	0–0	0.0%	0–2	2	0.7	0	2	0	0	1
Courtney Ramey	32	32	992	31.0	337	10.5	117–294	39.8%	83–206	40.3%	20–37	54.1%	14–110	124	3.9	113	64	51	34	2
Ažoulas Tubelis	35	34	1056	30.2	694	19.8	274–481	57.0%	10–32	31.3%	136–178	76.4%	93–227	320	9.1	70	98	84	40	24
Tautvilas Tubelis	5	0	8	1.6	0	0.0	0–3	0.0%	0–3	0.0%	0–0	0.0%	0–1	1	0.2	0	0	0	0	0
Henri Veesaar	29	0	205	7.1	70	2.4	26–42	61.9%	3–11	27.3%	15–21	71.4%	14–29	43	1.5	15	30	12	4	12
Grant Weitman	6	0	12	2.0	2	0.3	1–2	50.0%	0–0	0.0%	0–0	0.0%	1–1	2	0.3	0	3	1	0	0
Total	35		7000	200.0	2,866	81.9	1023–2072	49.4%	295–781	37.8%	525–742	70.8%	356–1020	1,376	39.3	662	593	468	213	110

== Awards and honors ==
Weekly honors
Recipient (Position)	Award (Pac-12 Conference)	Stats (PPG/RPG/APG)	Week	Date Awarded	Ref.
Oumar Ballo (C)	Pac-12 Player of the Week	21.0 Points, 10.7 Rebounds, 0.6 Steals	Week 3	November 28, 2022	
Ąžuolas Tubelis (PF)	Pac-12 Player of the Week	20.0 Points, 9.0 Rebounds, 2.0 Assists	Week 7	December 26, 2022	
Ąžuolas Tubelis (PF)	NCAA Player of the Week	29.5 Points, 8.5 Rebounds, 2.0 Assists, 2.5 Steals	Week 14	February 6, 2023	
Ąžuolas Tubelis (PF)	Naismith Men’s College Player of the Week	29.5 Points, 8.5 Rebounds, 2.0 Assists, 2.5 Steals	Week 14	February 6, 2023	
Ąžuolas Tubelis (PF)	Pac-12 Player of the Week	29.5 Points, 8.5 Rebounds, 2.0 Assists, 2.5 Steals	Week 14	February 6, 2023	
Kylan Boswell (PG)	Pac-12 Freshman of the Week	14.0 Points, 2.0 Rebounds, 2.0 Assists, 1.0 Steals	Week 17	March 6, 2023	

=== Postseason ===
Conference honors
Recipient (Position)	Award (Pac-12 Conference)	Stats (PPG/RPG/APG)	Ref.
Ąžuolas Tubelis (PF)	1st Team All Pac-12	19.9 PPG/9.2 RPG/2.0 APG/1.1 SPG	
Ąžuolas Tubelis (PF)	Pac-12 Tournament Most Outstanding Player	18.6 PPG/10.3 RPG/2.3 APG/0.6 SPG	
Ąžuolas Tubelis (PF)	All-Pac-12 Conference Tournament Team	18.6 PPG/10.3 RPG/2.3 APG/0.6 SPG	
Oumar Ballo (C)	1st Team All Pac-12	13.9 PPG/8.6 RPG/1.7 APG/1.2 BPG	
Oumar Ballo (C)	All-Pac-12 Conference Tournament Team	17.0 PPG/8.0 RPG/1.0 APG/1.6 BPG	

==== National awards ====
National award honors
Honors	Player	Position	Ref.
Associated Press 2nd Team All-American	Ąžuolas Tubelis	PF	
NABC 2nd Team All-American	Ąžuolas Tubelis	PF	
Sporting News 2nd Team All-American	Ąžuolas Tubelis	PF	
USBWA 2nd Team All-American	Ąžuolas Tubelis	PF	
John Wooden All-American	Ąžuolas Tubelis	PF	

== Rankings ==
Ranking movements Legend: ██ Increase in ranking ██ Decrease in ranking ( ) = First-place votes
	Week																			
Poll	Pre	1	2	3	4	5	6	7	8	9	10	11	12	13	14	15	16	17	18	Final
AP	17	14	14	4	10	9	5	5	5	9	11	6	5	4 (1)	8	7	8	8	8	Not released
Coaches	13	12	12	4	9	9	5	5	4	9	11	8	7	4	8	7	9	9	8	17

*AP does not release post-NCAA Tournament rankings

== See also ==
2022–23 Arizona Wildcats women's basketball team
