= Kerr Kriisa =

Estonian basketball player

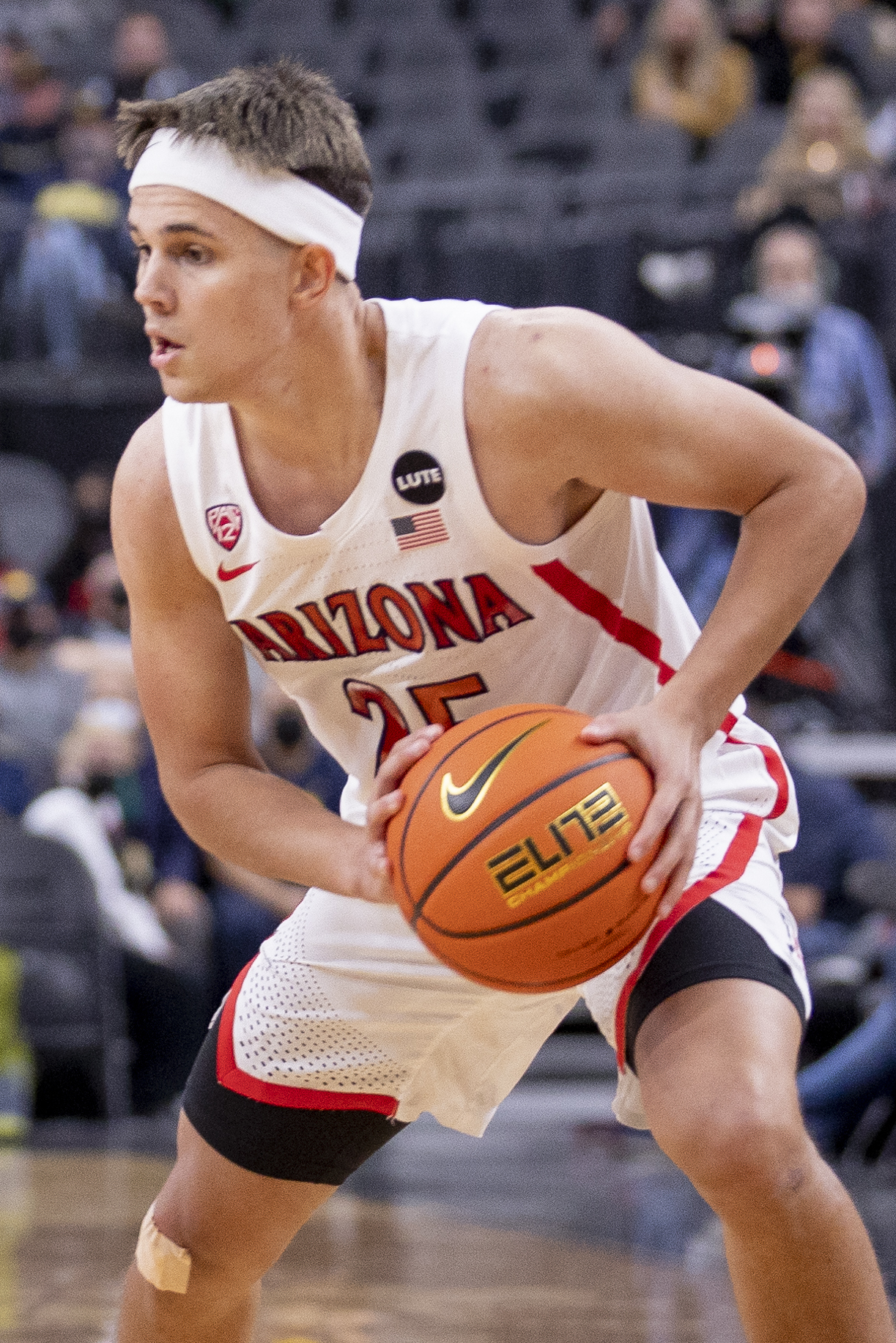
- Kriisa with Arizona in 2021

Personal information
- Born: 2 January 2001 (age 25) Tartu, Estonia
- Listed height: 1.90 m (6 ft 3 in)
- Listed weight: 86 kg (190 lb)

Career information
- College: Arizona (2020–2023); West Virginia (2023–2024); Kentucky (2024–2025); Cincinnati (2025–2026)
- Playing career: 2016–present
- Position: Point guard

Career history
- 2016–2017: Tartu Ülikool
- 2017–2018: Brose Bamberg
- 2017–2018: →Baunach Young Pikes
- 2018–2020: Žalgiris
- 2018–2020: →Žalgiris-2
- 2019–2020: →Prienai

Kerr Kriisa (born 2 January 2001) is an Estonian basketball player who played college basketball for the Arizona Wildcats, the West Virginia Mountaineers, the Kentucky Wildcats and the Cincinnati Bearcats. Listed at 6 feet 3 inches (1.9 m) and 190 pounds (86.2 kg), he plays the point guard position. A native of Tartu, he has competed with Estonian junior national teams on multiple occasions.

== Early career ==
=== 2016–2018: Early years ===
Kriisa played for the youth teams of his hometown club BC Tartu since he was 12 years old and debuted with Tartu Ülikool in the 2016–17 KML season at the age of 15. In September 2017 he signed with Brose Bamberg and started playing in their affiliate team Baunach Young Pikes. His stint in Germany was cut short due to periostitis and he returned to Estonia for treatment.

=== 2018–2020: Žalgiris ===
In August 2018, he signed with Žalgiris. In his first year with the Kaunas team Kriisa played on the Lithuanian second league (NKL) team Žalgiris-2 and also for the youth team in the Euroleague Basketball Next Generation Tournament. He was awarded with the MVP and All-Tournament Team honours at the Kaunas Qualifying Tournament. Kriisa averaged 17.3 points, 4.7 assists and 2.7 rebounds over 7 games in the 2018–19 season of Next Generation Tournament.

Kriisa made his EuroLeague debut for Žalgiris on 25 October 2019 and scored his first point from a free throw as Žalgiris defeated LDLC ASVEL 70–56 in the Regular Season Round 4 game. In November 2019 Kriisa was sent on loan to another Lithuanian team CBet Prienai to gain experience in the Lithuanian Basketball League (LKL). His loan spell ended in January 2020 and Kriisa returned to Žalgiris-2.

== College career ==
=== 2020–2023: Arizona Wildcats ===
On 18 April 2020, Kriisa committed to play college basketball in the United States for Arizona. Analysts considered him to be the best European recruit considering playing at the collegiate level. After head coach Sean Miller was fired, he entered the NCAA transfer portal while leaving the option of returning to Arizona open. New head coach Tommy Lloyd was able to recruit him back to Arizona for his sophomore season.

As a junior, Kriisa averaged 9.9 points and 5.1 assists per game. Following the 2022–23 season, Kriisa announced that he would enter the transfer portal again.

=== 2023–24: West Virginia Mountaineers ===
Kriisa announced on 5 April 2023 that he intended to transfer to West Virginia. After head coach Bob Huggins resigned following a DUI arrest, Kriisa initially announced on 23 June he was reentering the transfer portal. NCAA rules allow any student-athlete to enter the portal within 30 days after a head coaching change. Two days later, after top Huggins assistant Josh Eilert was named interim head coach for the 2023–24 season, Kriisa left the portal and announced he would stay at West Virginia.

After drawing an NCAA suspension for the first nine games of the 2023–24 season, Kriisa returned to start the rest of the Mountaineers' games, averaging 11.0 points and 4.7 assists and also leading the team in three-pointers. With a fifth year of college eligibility due to the NCAA granting such to all basketball players active in the COVID-impacted 2020–21 season, Kriisa entered the transfer portal again at the end of the 2023–24 season, announcing on 1 May that he would play his final college season at Kentucky.

== National team career ==
Kriisa has represented the Estonia national U-16 team at the 2016 and 2017 FIBA Europe Under-16 Championships and the Estonia national U-18 team at the 2019 FIBA Europe Under-18 Division B Championship.

== Career statistics ==
Legend
| GP | Games played | GS | Games started | MPG | Minutes per game |
| FG% | Field-goal percentage | 3P% | 3-point field-goal percentage | FT% | Free-throw percentage |
| RPG | Rebounds per game | APG | Assists per game | SPG | Steals per game |
| BPG | Blocks per game | PPG | Points per game | PIR | Performance index rating |
| **Bold** | Career high |

=== EuroLeague ===
| Year | Team | GP | GS | MPG | FG% | 3P% | FT% | RPG | APG | SPG | BPG | PPG | PIR |
|---|---|---|---|---|---|---|---|---|---|---|---|---|---|
| 2019–20 | Žalgiris | 1 | 0 | 2.1 | .000 | .000 | .500 | .0 | .0 | .0 | .0 | 1.0 | .0 |
| Career | | 1 | 0 | 2.1 | .000 | .000 | .500 | .0 | .0 | .0 | .0 | 1.0 | .0 |

=== College ===
| Year | Team | GP | GS | MPG | FG% | 3P% | FT% | RPG | APG | SPG | BPG | PPG |
|---|---|---|---|---|---|---|---|---|---|---|---|---|
| 2020–21 | Arizona | 8 | 5 | 22.9 | .333 | .368 | **1.000** | .5 | 2.4 | .4 | .0 | 5.5 |
| 2021–22 | Arizona | 33 | 31 | 29.6 | .348 | .336 | .816 | **2.5** | 4.7 | .6 | .1 | 9.7 |
| 2022–23 | Arizona | **35** | **34** | 31.1 | .372 | .366 | .767 | 2.4 | **5.1** | .6 | .0 | 9.9 |
| 2023–24 | West Virginia | 23 | 23 | **33.5** | **.429** | **.424** | .775 | **2.5** | 4.7 | **.8** | .0 | **11.0** |
| 2024–25 | Kentucky | 9 | 1 | 17.3 | .279 | .263 | .857 | 2.4 | 3.8 | .4 | **.2** | 4.4 |
| Career | | 108 | 94 | 29.4 | .370 | .362 | .791 | 2.3 | 4.6 | .6 | .1 | 9.3 |

== Personal life ==
Kerr is the son of former professional basketball player Valmo Kriisa. He is named after Steve Kerr, who also played basketball at the University of Arizona.

In July 2026, Kerr was arrested by the FBI on suspicion of participating in a fraud scheme during his time playing for West Virginia University in 2023–24.
