= 2022–23 NCAA Division I men's basketball rankings =

- Season: 2022–23
- NCAA Tournament: 2023
- Preseason No. 1: North Carolina
- NCAA Tournament Champions: UConn
NCAA Division I men's basketball rankings


Two human polls make up the 2022–23 NCAA Division I men's basketball rankings, the AP Poll and the Coaches Poll, in addition to various publications' preseason polls.

== Legend ==
	Increase in ranking
	Decrease in ranking
	New to rankings from previous week
	No movement from previous week
Italics	Number of first-place votes
(#–#)	Win–loss record
т	Tied with team above or below also with this symbol

== AP Poll ==
	Preseason Oct 17	Week 2 Nov 14	Week 3 Nov 21	Week 4 Nov 28	Week 5 Dec 5	Week 6 Dec 12	Week 7 Dec 19	Week 8 Dec 26	Week 9 Jan 2	Week 10 Jan 9	Week 11 Jan 16	Week 12 Jan 23	Week 13 Jan 30	Week 14 Feb 6	Week 15 Feb 13	Week 16 Feb 20	Week 17 Feb 27	Week 18 Mar 6	Final Mar 13	
1.	North Carolina (47)	North Carolina (2−0) (44)	North Carolina (4−0) (47)	Houston (6−0) (45)	Houston (8−0) (37)	Purdue (10−0) (27)	Purdue (11−0) (40)	Purdue (12−0) (40)	Purdue (13–0) (60)	Houston (16–1) (34)	Houston (17–1) (34)	Purdue (19–1) (39)	Purdue (21–1) (62)	Purdue (22–2) (38)	Alabama (22–3) (38)	Houston (25–2) (48)	Houston (27–2) (49)	Houston (29–2) (58)	Alabama (29–5) (48)	1.
2.	Gonzaga (12)	Gonzaga (2−0) (14)	Houston (5−0) (9)	Texas (5−0) (8)	Texas (6−0) (14)	Virginia (8−0) (19)	UConn (12−0) (21)	UConn (13−0) (20)	Houston (14–1)	Kansas (14–1) (22)	Kansas (16–1) (23)	Alabama (17–2) (23)	Tennessee (18–3)	Houston (22–2) (22)	Houston (23–2) (22)	Alabama (23–4) (7)	Alabama (25–4) (5)	UCLA (27–4) (3)	Houston (31–3) (9)	2.
3.	Houston (1)	Houston (2−0) (2)	Kansas (4−0) (1)	Virginia (5−0) (2)	Virginia (7−0) (3)	UConn (11−0) (15)	Houston (11−1)	Houston (12−1)	Kansas (12–1)	Purdue (15–1) (4)	Purdue (16–1) (3)	Houston (18–2)	Houston (20–2)	Alabama (20–3) (1)	Purdue (23–3) (2)	Kansas (22–5) (7)	Kansas (24–5) (8)	Kansas (25–6)	Purdue (29–5) (3)	3.
4.	Kentucky (2)	Kentucky (2−0) (3)	Texas (3−0) (5)	Arizona (6−0)	Purdue (8−0) (8)	Alabama (8−1)	Kansas (10−1)	Kansas (11−1)	UConn (14–1) (1)	Alabama (13–2)	Alabama (15–2)	Tennessee (16–3)	Alabama (18–3)	Arizona (21–3) (1)	UCLA (21–4)	UCLA (23–4)	UCLA (25–4)	Alabama (26–5)	Kansas (27–7)	4.
5.	Kansas т	Baylor (2−0)	Virginia (4−0) (1)	Purdue (6−0) (8)	UConn (9−0)	Houston (9−1)	Arizona (10−1)	Arizona (12−1)	Arizona (13–1)	Tennessee (13–2)	UCLA (16–2)	Kansas State (17–2)	Arizona (19–3)	Texas (19–4)	Kansas (20–5)	Purdue (24–4)	Purdue (24–5)	Purdue (26–5)	Texas (26–8)	5.
6.	Baylor т	Kansas (2−0)	Gonzaga (3−1)	Baylor (5−1)	Kansas (8−1)	Tennessee (9−1) (1)	Virginia (8−1)	Texas (10−1)	Texas (12–1)	UConn (15–2)	Gonzaga (16–3)	Arizona (17–3)	Virginia (16–3)	Tennessee (19–4)	Texas (20–5)	Virginia (21–4)	Marquette (23–6)	Marquette (25–6)	Marquette (28–6)	6.
7.	Duke	Duke (2−0)	Baylor (4−1)	Creighton (6−1)	Tennessee (7−1)	Texas (7−1)	Texas (9−1)	Tennessee (10−2)	Alabama (11–2)	UCLA (14–2)	Texas (15–2)	Virginia (15–3)	Kansas State (18–3)	UCLA (19–4)	Virginia (19–4)	Arizona (24–4)	Baylor (21–8)	Texas (23–8)	UCLA (29–5) (1)	7.
8.	UCLA	UCLA (2−0)	Duke (3−1)	UConn (8−0)	Alabama (7−1)	Kansas (9−1)	Tennessee (9−2)	Alabama (10−2)	Tennessee (11–2)	Gonzaga (14–3)	Xavier (15–3)	UCLA (16–3)	Kansas (17–4)	Virginia (17–4)	Arizona (22–4)	Texas (21–6)	Arizona (24–5)	Arizona (25–6)	Arizona (28–6)	8.
9.	Creighton	Arkansas (2−0)	Arkansas (3−0)	Kansas (6−1)	Arkansas (7−1)	Arizona (8−1)	Alabama (9−2)	Arkansas (11−1)	Gonzaga (12–3)	Arizona (14–2)	Tennessee (14–3)	Kansas (16–3)	UCLA (17–4)	Kansas (18–5)	Baylor (19–6)	Baylor (20–7)	Texas (22–7)	Gonzaga (26–5)	Gonzaga (28–5)	9.
10.	Arkansas	Creighton (2−0)	Creighton (4−0)	Indiana (6−0)	Arizona (7−1)	Arkansas (9−1)	Arkansas (10−1)	Gonzaga (10−3)	UCLA (13–2)	Texas (13–2)	Virginia (13–3)	Texas (16–3)	Texas (17–4)	Marquette (19–5)	Tennessee (19–6)	Marquette (21–6)	Gonzaga (25–5)	Baylor (22–9)	UConn (25–8)	10.
11.	Tennessee	Texas (2−0)	Indiana (4−0)	Alabama (6−1) т	Auburn (8−0)	Baylor (7−2)	Gonzaga (9−3)	UCLA (11−2)	Virginia (10–2)	Kansas State (14–1)	Arizona (15–3)	TCU (15–4)	Baylor (16–5)	Iowa State (16–6)	Marquette (20–6)	Tennessee (20–7)	Kansas State (22–7)	UConn (24–7)	Baylor (22–10)	11.
12.	Texas	Indiana (2−0)	Michigan State (3−1)	Arkansas (5−1) т	Baylor (6−2)	Duke (10−2)	Baylor (7−2)	Baylor (9−2)	Miami (FL) (13–1)	Xavier (13–3)	Iowa State (13–3)	Iowa State (14–4)	Gonzaga (18–4)	Kansas State (18–5)	Kansas State (19–6)	Gonzaga (23–5)	Tennessee (21–8)	Kansas State (23–8)	Duke (26–8)	12.
13.	Indiana	Auburn (2−0)	Auburn (4−0)	Tennessee (5−1)	Maryland (8−0)	Kentucky (7−2)	UCLA (10−2)	Virginia (8−2)	Arkansas (11–2)	Virginia (11–3)	Kansas State (15–2)	Xavier (16–4)	Iowa State (15–5)	Xavier (19–5)	Gonzaga (21–5)	Miami (FL) (22–5)	Virginia (21–6)	Virginia (23–6)	Xavier (25–9)	13.
14.	TCU	Arizona (2−0)	Arizona (3−0)	Gonzaga (6−2)	Indiana (7−1)	Indiana (8−2)	Duke (10−2)	Miami (FL) (12−1)	Wisconsin (10–2)	Iowa State (12–2)	TCU (14–3)	Gonzaga (17–4)	Marquette (17–5)	Baylor (17–6)	Indiana (18–7)	Kansas State (20–7)	UConn (22–7)	Miami (FL) (24–6)	Virginia (25–7)	14.
15.	Auburn	TCU (2−0)	Kentucky (3−2)	Auburn (7−0)	Duke (8−2)	Gonzaga (7−3)	Mississippi State (11−0)	Wisconsin (9−2)	Indiana (10–3)	Arkansas (12–3)	UConn (15–4)	Auburn (16–3)	TCU (16–5)	Saint Mary's (21–4)	Miami (FL) (20–5)	Saint Mary’s (24–5)	Indiana (20–9)	Xavier (23–8)	Kansas State (23–9)	15.
16.	Villanova	Virginia (2−0)	Illinois (4−1)	Illinois (5−1)	Kentucky (6−2)	UCLA (8−2)	Illinois (8−3)	Indiana (10−3)	Duke (11–3)	Miami (FL) (13–2)	Auburn (14–3)	Marquette (16–5)	Xavier (17–5)	Gonzaga (19–5)	Xavier (19–6)	Xavier (20–7)	Miami (FL) (23–6)	Saint Mary's (25–6)	Miami (FL) (25–7)	16.
17.	Arizona	San Diego State (2−0)	San Diego State (3−0)	Duke (6−2)	Illinois (6−2)	Mississippi State (9−0)	Wisconsin (9−2)	Duke (10−3)	TCU (12–1)	TCU (13–2)	Miami (FL) (14–3)	Baylor (14–5)	Providence (17–5)	TCU (17–6)	Saint Mary's (22–5)	Indiana (19–8)	Saint Mary's (25–6)	Tennessee (22–9)	Texas A&M (25–9)	17.
18.	Virginia	Alabama (2−0)	Alabama (4−0)	North Carolina (5−2)	Gonzaga (5−3)	Illinois (7−3)	Indiana (8−3)	TCU (10−1)	Xavier (12–3)	Wisconsin (11–3)	Charleston (18–1)	Charleston (21–1)	Saint Mary's (19–4)	Indiana (16–7)	Creighton (17–8)	UConn (20–7)	San Diego State (23–5)	Texas A&M (23–8)	San Diego State (27–6)	18.
19.	San Diego State	Illinois (2−0)	UCLA (3−2)	Kentucky (4−2)	UCLA (7−2)	Auburn (8−1)	Kentucky (7−3)	Kentucky (8−3)	Baylor (10–3)	Providence (14–3)	Clemson (15–3)	UConn (16–5)	Florida Atlantic (21–1)	Miami (FL) (18–5)	Iowa State (16–8)	Creighton (18–9)	Xavier (21–8)	Indiana (21–10)	Saint Mary's (26–7)	19.
20.	Alabama	Michigan (2−0)	UConn (5−0)	Michigan State (5−2)	Iowa State (7−1)	Maryland (8−2)	TCU (9−1)	Auburn (10−2)	Missouri (12–1)	Missouri (13–2)	Marquette (14–5)	Miami (FL) (15–4)	Clemson (18–4)	Providence (17–6)	UConn (19–7)	Providence (20–7)	Providence (21–8)	San Diego State (24–6)	Tennessee (23–10)	20.
21.	Oregon	Dayton (2−0)	Texas Tech (3−0)	UCLA (5−2)	Creighton (6−3)	TCU (8−1)	Virginia Tech (11−1)	Mississippi State (11−1)	New Mexico (14–0)	Auburn (12–3)	Baylor (12–5)	Florida Atlantic (19–1)	Indiana (15–6)	UConn (18–6)	San Diego State (20–5)	Northwestern (20–7)	Maryland (20–9)	Duke (23–8)	Indiana (22–11)	21.
22.	Michigan	Tennessee (1−1)	Tennessee (2−1)	Maryland (6−0)	San Diego State (6−2)	Wisconsin (8−2)	Miami (FL) (11−1)	Xavier (10−3) т	Auburn (11–2)	Charleston (16–1)	Providence (14–4)	Saint Mary's (18–4)	San Diego State (17–4)	NC State (19–5)	TCU (17–8)	San Diego State (21–5)	TCU (19–10)	TCU (20–11)	TCU (21–12)	22.
23.	Illinois	Texas Tech (2−0)	Maryland (5−0)	Iowa State (5−1)	Mississippi State (8−0)	Ohio State (7−2)	Auburn (9−2)	New Mexico (12−0) т	Charleston (14–1)	San Diego State (12–3)	Rutgers (13–5)	Providence (15–5)	Miami (FL) (16–5)	Creighton (15–8)	NC State (20–6)	Iowa State (17–9)	Kentucky (20–9)	Kentucky (21–10)	Missouri (24–9)	23.
24.	Dayton	Texas A&M (2−0)	Purdue (3−0)	San Diego State (4−2)	TCU (6−1)	Virginia Tech (10−1)	Marquette (9−3)	West Virginia (10−2)	Ohio State (10–2)	Duke (12–4)	Florida Atlantic (16–1)	Clemson (16–4)	UConn (16–6)	Rutgers (16–7)	Providence (18–7)	TCU (18–9)	Texas A&M (21–8)	Creighton (20–11)	Memphis (26–8)	24.
25.	Texas Tech	UConn (2−0)	Iowa (3−0)	Ohio State (5−1)	Ohio State (6−2)	Miami (FL) (10−1)	Arizona State (11−1)	North Carolina (9−4)	Iowa State (10–2)	Marquette (14–3)	Arkansas (12–5)	New Mexico (18–2)	Auburn (16–5)	San Diego State (18–5)	Florida Atlantic (24–2)	Texas A&M (20–7)	Pittsburgh (21–8)	Missouri (23–8)	Florida Atlantic (31–3)	25.
	Preseason Oct 17	Week 2 Nov 14	Week 3 Nov 21	Week 4 Nov 28	Week 5 Dec 5	Week 6 Dec 12	Week 7 Dec 19	Week 8 Dec 26	Week 9 Jan 2	Week 10 Jan 9	Week 11 Jan 16	Week 12 Jan 23	Week 13 Jan 30	Week 14 Feb 6	Week 15 Feb 13	Week 16 Feb 20	Week 17 Feb 27	Week 18 Mar 6	Final Mar 13	
		Dropped: Villanova (1−1); Oregon (1−1)	Dropped: TCU (4−1); Michigan (4−1); Dayton (3−1); Texas A&M (3−2)	Dropped: Iowa (5−1); Texas Tech (4−2)	Dropped: North Carolina (5−4); Michigan State (5−4)	Dropped: Iowa State (8−2); Creighton (6−4); San Diego State (7−3)	Dropped: Maryland (8−3); Ohio State (7−3)	Dropped: Illinois (8−4); Virginia Tech (11−2); Marquette (9−4); Arizona State (11−2)	Dropped: Kentucky (9–4); Mississippi State (11–2); West Virginia (10–3); North Carolina (9–5)	Dropped: Indiana (10–5); Baylor (10–5); New Mexico (14–2); Ohio State (10–5)	Dropped: Wisconsin (11–5); Missouri (13–4); San Diego State (13–4); Duke (13–5)	Dropped: Rutgers (13–6); Arkansas (13–6)	Dropped: Charleston (21–2); New Mexico (19–3)	Dropped: Florida Atlantic (22–2); Clemson (18–6); Auburn (17–6)	Dropped: Rutgers (16–9)	Dropped: NC State (21–7); Florida Atlantic (24–3)	Dropped: Creighton (18–11); Northwestern (20–9); Iowa State (17–11)	Dropped: Providence (21–10); Maryland (20–11); Pittsburgh (20–10)	Dropped: Kentucky (21–11); Creighton (21–12)	

== USA Today Coaches Poll ==
	Preseason Oct 25	Week 2 Nov 14	Week 3 Nov 21	Week 4 Nov 28	Week 5 Dec 5	Week 6 Dec 12	Week 7 Dec 19	Week 8 Dec 26	Week 9 Jan 2	Week 10 Jan 9	Week 11 Jan 16	Week 12 Jan 23	Week 13 Jan 30	Week 14 Feb 6	Week 15 Feb 13	Week 16 Feb 20	Week 17 Feb 27	Week 18 Mar 6	Week 19 Mar 12	Final Apr. 4	
1.	North Carolina (23)	North Carolina (2−0) (22)	North Carolina (4–0) (23)	Houston (6–0) (23)	Houston (8–0) (21)	Purdue (10–0) (9)	Purdue (11–0) (24)	Purdue (12–0) (25)	Purdue (13–0) (30)	Houston (16–1) (14)	Houston (17–1) (17)	Purdue (19–1) (24)	Purdue (21–1) (32)	Purdue (22–2) (15)	Alabama (22–3) (15)	Houston (25–2) (24)	Houston (27–2) (27)	Houston (29–2) (29)	Houston (31–3) (21)	UConn (31–8) (32)	1.
2.	Gonzaga (5)	Gonzaga (2−0) (7)	Houston (5–0) (7)	Texas (5–0) (5)	Texas (6–0) (4)	Virginia (8–0) (12)	UConn (12–0) (7)	UConn (13–0) (7)	Houston (14–1) (2)	Kansas (14–1) (12)	Kansas (16–1) (9)	Alabama (17–2) (8)	Tennessee (18–3)	Houston (22–2) (13)	Houston (23–2) (15)	Alabama (23–4) (6)	Alabama (25–4) (2)	UCLA (27–4)	Alabama (29–5) (8)	San Diego State (32–7)	2.
3.	Houston (1)	Houston (2−0) (2)	Kansas (4–0)	Virginia (5–0) (1)	Virginia (7–0)	UConn (11–0) (7)	Houston (11–1)	Houston (12–1)	Kansas (13–1)	Purdue (15–1) (6)	Purdue (16–1) (5)	Houston (18–2)	Houston (20–2)	Alabama (20–3) (1)	Purdue (23–3) (1)	UCLA (23–4)	Kansas (24–5) (3)	Purdue (26–5)	Purdue (29–5) (2)	Miami (FL) (29–8)	3.
4.	Kentucky (3)	Kentucky (2−0) (1)	Texas (3–0) (1)	Arizona (6–0)	Purdue (8–0) (6)	Houston (9–1)	Kansas (10–1) (1)	Kansas (11–1)	Arizona (12–1)	Alabama (13–2)	Alabama (15–2) (1)	Tennessee (16–3)	Virginia (16–3)	Arizona (21–3)	UCLA (21–4)	Kansas (22–5) (1)	UCLA (25–4)	Kansas (25–6) (2)	Marquette (28–6)	Alabama (31–6)	4.
5.	Kansas	Kansas (2−0)	Gonzaga (3–1)	Purdue (6–0) (3)	UConn (9–0)	Alabama (8–1)	Arizona (10–1)	Arizona (12–1)	UConn (14–1)	Tennessee (13–2)	UCLA (16–2)	Kansas State (17–2)	Alabama (18–3)	Tennessee (19–4) (2)	Texas (20–5)	Purdue (24–4)	Purdue (24–5)	Alabama (26–5)	Kansas (27–7) (1)	Florida Atlantic (35–4)	5.
6.	Baylor	Baylor (2−0)	Virginia (4–0)	UConn (8–0)	Kansas (8–1)	Kansas (9–1) (1)	Virginia (8–1)	Texas (10–1)	Texas (12–1)	UCLA (14–2)	Gonzaga (16–3)	Virginia (15–3)	Kansas State (18–3)	Texas (19–4) (1)	Virginia (19–4) (1)	Virginia (21–4) (1)	Marquette (23–6)	Marquette (25–6)	UCLA (29–5)	Houston (33–4)	6.
7.	UCLA	UCLA (2−0)	Baylor (4–1)	Creighton (6–1)	Tennessee (7–1)	Tennessee (9–1)	Texas (9–1)	Arkansas (11–1)	Alabama (11–2)	UConn (15–2)	Texas (15–2)	UCLA (17–3)	Arizona (19–3)	UCLA (19–4)	Kansas (20–5)	Arizona (24–4)	Texas (22–7)	Texas (23–8)	Texas (26–8)	Texas (29–9)	7.
8.	Duke	Duke (2−0)	Creighton (4–0)	Indiana (6–0)	Arkansas (7–1)	Texas (7–1)	Arkansas (10–1)	UCLA (11–2)	UCLA (13–2)	Gonzaga (14–3)	Xavier (15–3)	Arizona (17–3)	Kansas (17–4)	Kansas (18–5)	Arizona (22–4)	Texas (21–6)	Baylor (21–8)	Gonzaga (26–5)	Arizona (28–6)	UCLA (31–6)	8.
9.	Creighton	Creighton (2−0)	Arkansas (3–0)	Kansas (6–1)	Arizona (7–1)	Arizona (8–1)	UCLA (10–2)	Alabama (10–2)	Tennessee (11–2)	Arizona (14–2)	Tennessee (14–3)	Kansas (16–3)	UCLA (17–4)т	Virginia (17–4)	Baylor (19–6)	Marquette (21–6)	Arizona (24–5)	Arizona (25–6)	Gonzaga (28–5)	Kansas State (26–10)	9.
10.	Arkansas	Arkansas (2−0)	Duke (3–1)	Baylor (5–1)	Alabama (7–1)	Arkansas (9–1)	Alabama (9–2)	Tennessee (10–2)	Gonzaga (12–3)	Texas (13–2)	Virginia (13–3)	Texas (16–3)	Texas (17–4)т	Marquette (19–5)	Marquette (20–6)	Baylor (20–7)	Gonzaga (25–5)	Baylor (22–9)	Virginia (25–7)	Gonzaga (31–6)	10.
11.	Tennessee	Texas (2−0)	Indiana (4–0)	Arkansas (5–1)	Indiana (7–1)	Baylor (7–2)	Tennessee (9–2)	Gonzaga (10–3)	Virginia (10–2)	Xavier (13–3)	Arizona (15-3)	TCU (15–4)	Baylor (16–5)	Kansas State (18–5)	Tennessee (19–6)	Miami (FL)	Kansas State (22–7)	Virginia (23–6)	Baylor (22–10)	Kansas (28–8)	11.
12.	Texas	Arizona (2−0)	Arizona (3–0)	Gonzaga (5–2)	Baylor (6–2)	Duke (10–2)	Gonzaga (9–3)	Virginia (8–2)	Miami (FL) (13–1)	Virginia (11–3)	Iowa State (13–3)	Xavier (16–4)	Marquette (17–5)	Baylor (17–6)	Gonzaga (21–5)	Gonzaga (23–5)	Virginia (21–6)	Kansas State (23–8)	UConn (25–8)	Creighton (24–13)	12.
13.	Arizona	Indiana (2−0)	Kentucky (3–2)	Tennessee (5–1)	Maryland (8–0)	Kentucky (7–2)	Baylor (8–2)	Baylor (9–2)	Arkansas (11–2)	Kansas State (14–1)	TCU (14–3)	Iowa State (14–4)	Iowa State (15–5)	Iowa State (16–6)	Miami (FL) (20–5)	Tennessee (20–7)	Indiana (20–9)	Miami (FL) (24–6)	Kansas State (23–9)	Purdue (29–6)	13.
14.	Indiana	Virginia (2−0)	Illinois (4–1)	Alabama (6–1)	Auburn (8–0)	UCLA (8–2)	Duke (10–2)	Duke (10–3)	Duke (11–3)	Iowa State (12–2)	UConn (15–4)	Gonzaga (17–4)	Gonzaga (18–4)	Saint Mary's (21–4)	Kansas State (19–6)	Saint Mary’s (24–5)	Tennessee (21–8)	UConn (24–7)	Xavier (25–9)	Marquette (29–7)	14.
15.	Auburn	Auburn (2−0)	Michigan State (3–1)	North Carolina (5–2)	Duke (6–2)	Gonzaga (7–3)	Mississippi State (11–0)	Wisconsin (9–2)	Wisconsin (10–2)	Miami (FL) (13–2)	Kansas State (15–2)	Marquette (16–5)	Xavier (17–5)	Xavier (19–5)	Indiana (18–7)	Xavier (20–7)	Miami (FL) (23–6)	Xavier (23–8)	Miami (FL) (25–7)	Xavier (27–10)	15.
16.	TCU	Alabama (2−0)	Auburn (4–0)	Duke (6–2)	Kentucky (6–2)	Indiana (8–2)	Kentucky (7–3) т	Miami (FL) (12–1)	Baylor (10–3)	Arkansas (12–3)	Miami (FL) (14–3)	Auburn (16–3)	TCU (16–5)	Gonzaga (19–5)	Xavier (19–6)	Kansas State (20–7)	Saint Mary's (25–6)	Saint Mary's (25–6)	Duke (26–8)	Tennessee (25–11)	16.
17.	Villanova	Tennessee (1−1)	UCLA (3–2)	Illinois (5–1)	Illinois (6–2)	Maryland (8–2)	Illinois (8–3) т	Kentucky (8–3)	TCU (13–1)	TCU (13–2)	Auburn (14–3)	Baylor (14–5)	Providence (17–5)	Providence (17–6)	Saint Mary's (22–5)	Indiana (19–8)	Xavier (21–8)	Indiana (21–10)	Texas A&M (25–9)	Arizona (28–7)	17.
18.	Virginia	TCU (2−0)	Alabama (4–0)	Kentucky (4–2)	UCLA (7–2) т	Auburn (8–1)	Wisconsin (9–2)	Indiana (10–3)	Xavier (12–3)	Wisconsin (11–3)	Marquette (14–5)	Charleston (21–1)	Saint Mary's (19–4)	Indiana (16–7)	Iowa State (16–8)	Providence (20–7)	UConn (22–7)	Texas A&M (23–8)	San Diego State (27–6)	Duke (27–9)	18.
19.	Alabama	San Diego State (2−0)	San Diego State (3–0)	Auburn (7–0)	Gonzaga (5–3) т	Illinois (7–3)	TCU (9–1)	TCU (10–1)	Indiana (10–3)	Providence (14–3)	Clemson (15–3)	Miami (FL) (15–4)	Clemson (18–4)	TCU (16–7)	Creighton (17–8)	Creighton (18–9)	San Diego State (23–5)	Tennessee (22–9)	Saint Mary's (26–7) т	Baylor (23–11)	19.
20.	San Diego State	Illinois (2−0)	Texas Tech (3–0)	Michigan State (5–2)	Iowa State (7–1)	Mississippi State (9−0)	Virginia Tech (11–1)	Mississippi State (11–1)	Auburn (11–2)	Missouri (13–2)	Providence (14–4)	UConn (16–5)	Florida Atlantic (21–1)	Miami (FL) (18–5)	San Diego State (20–5)	San Diego State (21–5)	Providence (21–8)	San Diego State (24–6)	Indiana (22–11) т	Michigan State (21–13)	20.
21.	Oregon	Michigan (2−0)	Tennessee (2–1)	UCLA (4–2)	Creighton (6–3)	Ohio State (7–2)	Indiana (8–3)	Maryland (9–3)	Missouri (12–1)	Duke (12–4)	Charleston (18–1)	Providence (15–5)	Miami (FL) (16–5)	UConn (18–6)	Providence (18–7)	Iowa State (17–9)	Texas A&M (21–8)	Duke (23–8)	Tennessee (23–10)	Arkansas (22–14)	21.
22.	Michigan	Texas Tech (2−0)	UConn (5–0)	Maryland (6–0)	San Diego State (6–2)	TCU (8–1)	Miami (FL) (11–1)	Illinois (8–4)	New Mexico (14–0)	Auburn (12–3)	Baylor (12–5)	Saint Mary's (18–4)	Indiana (15–6)	NC State (19–5)	NC State (20–6)	Northwestern (20–7)	TCU (19–10)	Creighton (20–11)	Creighton (21–12)	Saint Mary's (27–8)	22.
23.	Illinois	Dayton (2−0)	Purdue (3–0)	Iowa State (5−1)	Ohio State (6–2)	Wisconsin (8−2)т	Maryland (8–3)	Auburn (10–2)	Ohio State (10–3)	Marquette (14–3)	Illinois (12–5)	Clemson (16–4)	UConn (16–6)т	San Diego State (18–5)	UConn (19–7)	UConn (20–7)	Creighton (18–11)	TCU (20–11)	TCU (21–12)	Virginia (25–8)	23.
24.	Texas Tech	Purdue (2−0)	Iowa (3–0)	San Diego State (4–2)	Iowa (6–1)	Virginia Tech (10−1)т	Auburn (9–2)	West Virginia (10–2)	Illinois (9–4)	Charleston (16–1)	Saint Mary’s (16–4)	Florida Atlantic (19–1)	Auburn (16–5)т	Clemson (18–6) т	TCU (17–8)	NC State (21–7)	Maryland (20–9)	Kentucky (21–10)	Missouri (24–9)	Indiana (23–12)	24.
25.	Dayton	Michigan State (1−1)	Maryland (5–0)	Ohio State (5−1)	TCU (6–1)	Miami (FL) (10−1)	Marquette (9−3)	Xavier (10–3)	Kentucky (9–4)т Iowa State (10–2)т	San Diego State (12–3)	Arkansas (12–5)	Duke (14–5)	Illinois (15–6)	Duke (17–6) т	Texas A&M (18–7)	Texas A&M (20–7)	Pittsburgh (21–8)	Northwestern (21–10)	Florida Atlantic (31–3)	Texas A&M (25–10)	25.
	Preseason Oct 25	Week 2 Nov 14	Week 3 Nov 21	Week 4 Nov 28	Week 5 Dec 5	Week 6 Dec 12	Week 7 Dec 19	Week 8 Dec 26	Week 9 Jan 2	Week 10 Jan 9	Week 11 Jan 16	Week 12 Jan 23	Week 13 Jan 30	Week 14 Feb 6	Week 15 Feb 13	Week 16 Feb 20	Week 17 Feb 27	Week 18 Mar 6	Week 19 Mar 12	Final Apr. 4	
		Dropped: Villanova (1−1); Oregon (1−1)	Dropped: TCU (4−1); Michigan (4−1); Dayton (3−1)	Dropped: Iowa (5−1); Texas Tech (4−2)	Dropped: North Carolina (5−4); Michigan State (5−4)	Dropped: Iowa State (8−2); Creighton (6−4); San Diego State (7−3); Iowa (7−3)	Dropped: Ohio State (7−3)	Dropped: Virginia Tech (11−2); Marquette (9−4)	Dropped: Mississippi State (11–2); Maryland (10–4); West Virginia (10–3)	Dropped: Baylor (10–5); Indiana (10–5); New Mexico (14–2); Ohio State (10–5); Illinois (10–5); Kentucky (10–5)	Dropped: Wisconsin (11–5); Missouri (13–4); Duke (13–5); San Diego State (13–4)	Dropped: Illinois (13–6); Arkansas (13–6)	Dropped: Charleston (21–2); Duke (15–6)	Dropped: Florida Atlantic (22–2); Auburn (17–6); Illinois (16–7)	Dropped: Clemson (18–7); Duke (17–8)	Dropped: TCU (18–9)	Dropped: Iowa State (17–11); Northwestern (20–9); NC State (22–8)	Dropped: Providence (21–10); Maryland (20–11); Pittsburgh (20–10)	Dropped: Kentucky (21–11); Northwestern (21–11)	Dropped: TCU (22–13); Missouri (25–10)	

== See also ==
2022–23 NCAA Division I women's basketball rankings
