= 1989 Maui Invitational =

6th men's College basketball tournament 1989

1989 Maui Invitational Tournament
- Season: 1989–90
- Teams: 8
- Finals site: Lahaina Civic Center; Maui, Hawaii
- Champions: Missouri (1st title)
- Runner-up: North Carolina (1st title game)
- Semifinalists: Louisville; Villanova
- Winning coach: Norm Stewart (1st title)
- MVP: Doug Smith (Missouri)

The 1989 Maui Invitational Tournament was an early-season college basketball tournament that was played, for the 6th time, from November 24 to November 26, 1989. The tournament, which began in 1984, was part of the 1989-90 NCAA Division I men's basketball season. The tournament was played at the Lahaina Civic Center in Maui, Hawaii and was won by the Missouri Tigers. It was the first title for the program and its head coach Norm Stewart.

== Bracket ==
5th Place Game; Sunday, November 26
Evansville	60
James Madison	70
7th Place Game
Chaminade	49
San Diego State	63

Consolation 2nd Round; Saturday, November 25
Chaminade	53
Evansville	70
San Diego State	53
James Madison	56

First Round; Friday, November 24
Chaminade	70
12	Louisville	76
Evansville	53
11	Missouri	68
San Diego State	58
Villanova	66
7	North Carolina	80
James Madison	79

Semifinals; Saturday, November 25
12	Louisville	79
11	Missouri	82
Villanova	68
7	North Carolina	78

Championship; Sunday, November 26
11	Missouri	80
7	North Carolina	73
3rd Place Game
12	Louisville	83
Villanova	69
