= 1991 Maui Invitational =

1991 Maui Invitational Tournament
- Season: 1991–92
- Teams: 8
- Finals site: Lahaina Civic Center; Maui, Hawaii
- Champions: Michigan State (1st title)
- Runner-up: Arkansas (1st title game)
- Semifinalists: Chaminade; Rice
- Winning coach: Jud Heathcote (1st title)
- MVP: George Gilmore (Chaminade)

The 1991 Maui Invitational Tournament was an early-season college basketball tournament that was played, for the 8th time, from November 25 to November 27, 1991. The tournament, which began in 1984, was part of the 1991-92 NCAA Division I men's basketball season. The tournament was played at the Lahaina Civic Center in Maui, Hawaii and was won by the Michigan State Spartans. It was the first title for the program and its head coach Jud Heathcote.

== Bracket ==
5th place game November 27
Minnesota | 69
25 | Arizona State | 37
7th place game
Providence | 87
Lamar | 76

Consolation 2nd Round; November 26
Providence | 82
Minnesota | 89
Lamar | 64
25 | Arizona State | 74

First Round; November 25
Chaminade | 111
Providence | 108
Minnesota | 83
2 | Arkansas | 92
Michigan State | 81
Lamar | 68
25 | Arizona State | 71
Rice | 77

Semifinals; November 26
Chaminade | 84
2 | Arkansas | 99
Michigan State | 75
Rice | 67

Championship; November 27
2 | Arkansas | 59
Michigan State | 78
3rd place game
Chaminade | 86
Rice | 93
