= Lahaina Civic Center =

Arena on the island of Maui in Lahaina, Hawaii

Coordinates: 20.904995°N 156.683852°W

- Interactive map of Lahaina Civic Center
- Address: 1840 HI-30, Lahaina, Hawaii; United States
- Seating type: Bleachers
- Capacity: 2,400
- Surface: Hardwood
- Field size: 160 ft × 130 ft (49 m × 40 m)
- Field shape: 20,800 square feet

Construction
- Built: 1972

Tenants
- City of Lahaina (1972–present); Maui Invitational (1984–2019, 2022, 2024–present)

Website
- www.mauicounty.gov/facilities/Facility/Details/209

The Lahaina Civic Center is a sports, convention and entertainment complex located at Ka'a'ahi Street and Honoapi'ilani Highway in Lahaina, Hawaii, on the island of Maui. It is the site of the annual Maui Invitational Basketball Tournament, held every November during Thanksgiving week and hosted by Chaminade University located in Hawaii. Other events include the World Youth Basketball Tournament in July, concerts, trade shows, community festivals and fairs.

== History ==
The Lahaina Civic Center was built in 1972.

In the 2023 Hawaii wildfires, the Civic Center survived but other buildings surrounding it were destroyed.

== Facilities ==
=== Gymnasium ===
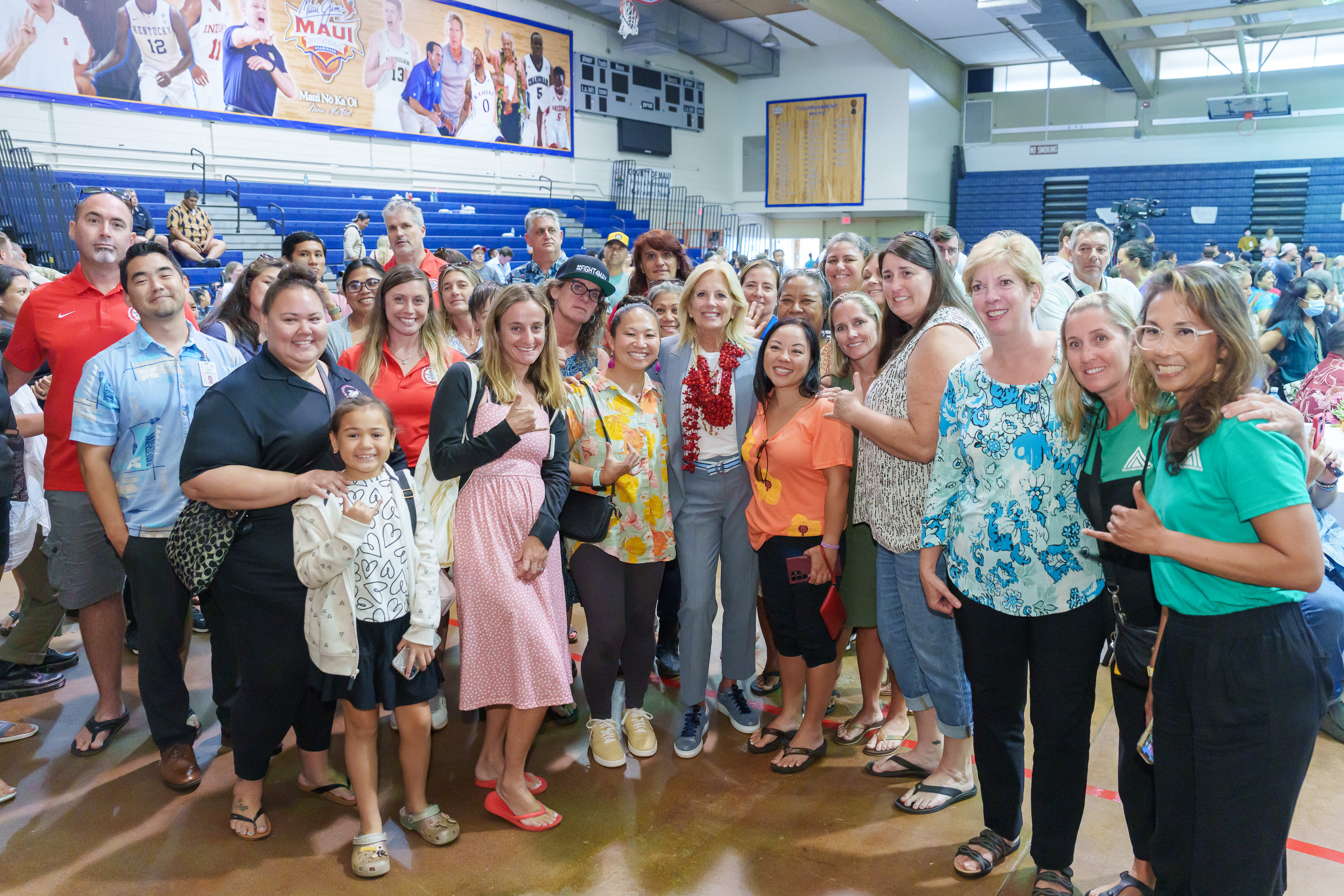
First Lady Jill Biden posing for a photo with Maui wildfire survivors in the Lahaina Civic Center on August 21, 2023.

The Civic Center Gymnasium is a 2,400-seat indoor arena with 20,800 square feet (160' by 130') of arena floor space, permanent seating on the East end and retractable bleachers on the North and South ends. It has four limited locker room facilities and two public restrooms.
