= 2023 Maui Invitational =

Early-season American college basketball tournament

2023 Maui Invitational Tournament
- Season: 2023–24
- Teams: 8
- Finals site: Stan Sheriff Center, Honolulu, Hawaii
- Champions: Purdue (1st title)
- Runner-up: Marquette (2nd title game)
- Semifinalists: Kansas (6th semifinal); Tennessee (2nd semifinal)
- Winning coach: Matt Painter (1st title)
- MVP: Zach Edey (Purdue)

The 2023 Maui Invitational Tournament was an early-season college basketball tournament that is the 40th edition of the tournament as part of the 2023–24 NCAA Division I men's basketball season. The tournament was originally scheduled to be played at the Lahaina Civic Center in Maui, Hawaii from November 20 to 22, 2023. However, due to the Hawaii wildfires in and around Maui, the event was relocated to the Stan Sheriff Center on the campus of the University of Hawaiʻi at Mānoa in Honolulu. It was the first year with insurance company Allstate as the main sponsor.

== Teams ==
Team	Most Recent Appearance	Best Finish
Chaminade	2021	Runner-Up (1984)
Gonzaga	2018	Champion (2009, 2018)
Kansas	2019	Champion (1996, 2015, 2019)
Marquette	2017	Runner-Up (2007)
Purdue	2014	Runner-Up (1999)
Syracuse	2013	Champion (1990, 1998, 2013)
Tennessee	2016	4th (2004)
UCLA	2019	Champion (2006)

== Bracket ==
5th Place Game; Wednesday, November 22
11	Gonzaga	69
UCLA	65
7th Place Game
Syracuse	105
Chaminade	56

Consolation 2nd Round; Tuesday, November 21
Syracuse	57
11	Gonzaga	76
Chaminade	48
UCLA	76

First Round; Monday, November 20
7	Tennessee	73
Syracuse	56
2	Purdue	73
11	Gonzaga	63
Chaminade	56
1	Kansas	83
UCLA	69
4	Marquette	71

Semifinals; Tuesday, November 21
7	Tennessee	67
2	Purdue	71
1	Kansas	59
4	Marquette	73

Championship; Wednesday, November 22
2	Purdue	78
4	Marquette	75
3rd Place Game
7	Tennessee	60
1	Kansas	69

=== All Tournament Team ===
- Hunter Dickinson, Kansas
- Dalton Knecht, Tennessee
- Oso Ighodaro, Marquette
- Braden Smith, Purdue
- Anton Watson, Gonzaga
