= 2024 Maui Invitational =

Early-season American college basketball tournament

2024 Maui Invitational Tournament
- Season: 2024–25
- Teams: 8
- Finals site: Lahaina Civic Center, Lahaina, Hawaii
- Champions: Auburn (1st title)
- Runner-up: Memphis (1st title game)
- Semifinalists: North Carolina (9th semifinal); Michigan State (5th semifinal)
- Winning coach: Bruce Pearl (1st title)
- MVP: Johni Broome (Auburn)

The 2024 Maui Invitational Tournament was an early-season college basketball tournament that was the 41st edition of the tournament as part of the 2024–25 NCAA Division I men's basketball season.

== Teams ==
Team	Most Recent Appearance	Best Finish
Auburn	2018	3rd (2018)
Colorado	2009	7th (2009)
Dayton	2019	Champion (2003)
Iowa State	2018	4th (1990)
Memphis	2011	3rd (1992, 2006)
Michigan State	2019	Champion (1991)
North Carolina	2020	Champion (1999, 2004, 2008, 2016)
UConn	2016	Champion (2005, 2010)

== Bracket ==
5th Place Game; Wednesday, November 27
Colorado	71
5	Iowa State	99
7th Place Game
2	UConn	67
Dayton	85

Consolation 2nd Round; Tuesday, November 26
2	UConn	72
Colorado	73
5	Iowa State	89
Dayton	84

First Round; Monday, November 25
2	UConn	97
Memphis	99^{*}
Michigan State	72
Colorado	56
4	Auburn	83
5	Iowa State	81
12	North Carolina	92
Dayton	90

Semifinals; Tuesday, November 26
Memphis	71
Michigan State	63
4	Auburn	85
12	North Carolina	72

Championship; Wednesday, November 27
Memphis	76
4	Auburn	90
3rd Place Game
Michigan State	94^{*}
12	North Carolina	91

=== All Tournament Team ===
- Johni Broome, Auburn
- Chad Baker-Mazara, Auburn
- PJ Haggerty, Memphis
- Tyrese Hunter, Memphis
- Keshon Gilbert, Iowa State
- Seth Trimble, North Carolina
