= 2025 Maui Invitational =

Early-season American college basketball tournament

2025 Maui Invitational Tournament
- Season: 2025–26
- Teams: 8
- Finals site: Lahaina Civic Center, Lahaina, Hawaii
- Champions: USC (1st title)
- Runner-up: Arizona State (2nd title game)
- Semifinalists: Seton Hall; Washington State
- Winning coach: Eric Musselman (1st title)
- MVP: Chad Baker-Mazara (USC)

The 2025 Maui Invitational Tournament, sponsored as the Southwest Maui Invitational, is an early-season college basketball tournament that will be the 41st edition of the tournament as part of the 2025–26 NCAA Division I men's basketball season.

== Teams ==
Team	Most Recent Appearance	Best Finish
Arizona State	2007	Champion (1994)
Boise State	first appearance	–
Chaminade	2023	Runner-Up (1984)
NC State	first appearance	–
Seton Hall	2001	6th (1984)
Texas	2020	Champion (2020)
USC	2012	6th (2012)
Washington State	first appearance	–

== Bracket ==
5th Place Game; Wednesday, November 26
23	NC State	97
Texas	102
7th Place Game
Boise State	102
Chaminade	76

Consolation 2nd Round; Tuesday, November 25
23	NC State	81
Boise State	70
Chaminade	78
Texas	119

First Round; Monday, November 24
Seton Hall	85
23	NC State	74
USC	70
Boise State	67
Washington State	90
Chaminade	85
Arizona State	87
Texas	86

Semifinals; Tuesday, November 25
Seton Hall	81
USC	83
Washington State	94
Arizona State	100

Championship; Wednesday, November 26
USC	88
Arizona State	75
3rd Place Game
Seton Hall	75
Washington State	61
