= 2021 Maui Invitational =

Early-season American college basketball tournament

2021 Maui Invitational Tournament
- Season: 2021–22
- Teams: 8
- Finals site: Michelob Ultra Arena, Paradise, Nevada
- Champions: Wisconsin (1st title)
- Runner-up: Saint Mary's (1st title game)
- Semifinalists: Houston (1st semifinal); Oregon (2nd semifinal)
- Winning coach: Greg Gard (1st title)
- MVP: Johnny Davis (Wisconsin)

The 2021 Maui Invitational Tournament was an early-season college basketball tournament played for the 38th time. The tournament began in 1984 and was part of the 2021–22 NCAA Division I men's basketball season. The Championship Round was planned to be played at the Lahaina Civic Center in Maui, Hawaii from November 22 to 25, 2021. Because of COVID-19 concerns, most notably ongoing restrictions on travel to Hawaii, the tournament was moved to the Michelob Ultra Arena on the Las Vegas Strip in Paradise, Nevada. The start date remained unchanged, but the title game was moved to November 24.

== Teams ==
Team	Most Recent Appearance	Best Finish
Butler	2012	Runner-Up (2012)
Chaminade	2019	Runner-Up (1984)
Houston	2001	7th–Place (2001)
Notre Dame	2017	Champion (2017)
Oregon	2016	4th-Place (2008)
Saint Mary's	first appearance	
Texas A&M	2018	8th-Place (1994)
Wisconsin	2016	Runner-Up (2016)

== Bracket ==
5th Place Game; Wednesday, November 24
Texas A&M	73
Notre Dame	67
7th Place Game
Butler	84
Chaminade	51

Consolation 2nd Round; Tuesday, November 23
Texas A&M	57
Butler	50
Chaminade	64
Notre Dame	90

First Round; Monday, November 22
Texas A&M	58
Wisconsin	69
Butler	52
12	Houston	70
Oregon	73
Chaminade	49
Saint Mary's	62
Notre Dame	59

Semifinals; Tuesday, November 23
Wisconsin	65
12	Houston	63
Oregon	50
Saint Mary's	62

Championship; Wednesday, November 24
Wisconsin	61
Saint Mary’s	55
3rd Place Game
12	Houston	78
Oregon	49
