= Maui Invitational =

Early season college basketball tournament

- Current season, competition or edition: 2026 Maui Invitational
- Sport: College basketball
- Founded: 1984
- Organizing body: Chaminade University
- No. of teams: 8
- Country: United States
- Venues: Lahaina Civic Center (Lahaina, Maui); Stan Sheriff Center (Honolulu, Oahu; 2023); Michelob Ultra Arena, (Paradise, Nevada; 2021); Asheville Civic Center, (Asheville, North Carolina; 2020)
- Most recent champion: USC Trojans
- Most titles: Duke Blue Devils (5)
- Broadcaster: ESPN
- Website: mauiinvitational.com

The Maui Invitational is an annual early-season college basketball tournament that takes place Thanksgiving week, normally in Lahaina, Hawaii, at the Lahaina Civic Center on the island of Maui. It is hosted by Chaminade University of Honolulu, an NCAA Division II school. Seven or eight NCAA Division I men's basketball teams are invited to Maui to compete in the field, with Chaminade competing every other year. The Maui Invitational has been played since 1984 and is carried by ESPN. As of the 2025–26 season, the title sponsor of the tournament is Southwest. Previous sponsors include Maui Jim, EA Sports, Camping World, Allstate, and Novavax.

== History ==
The tournament had its roots in a game that is considered one of the greatest upsets in college history. On December 23, 1982 the top-ranked and undefeated University of Virginia made a scheduled trip to Honolulu for a game. Originally seeking to play the University of Hawaii, Virginia agreed to play Chaminade, which at the time belonged to the NAIA, on the trip instead. In a game that was not televised and covered by only one sportswriter from outside the local media (Michael Wilbon of The Washington Post, who was in Honolulu to cover the University of Maryland's performance in the inaugural Aloha Bowl), Chaminade defeated the Ralph Sampson-led Virginia squad 77–72 in front of 3,300 spectators at the Neal S. Blaisdell Center. Shortly after the upset, Virginia head coach Terry Holland congratulated Chaminade's athletic director, Mike Vasconcellos, and suggested to him that he consider beginning a Hawaii tournament. Two years later, the Maui Classic was inaugurated with Chaminade reaching the final and losing to Providence.

Today the tournament provides schools an opportunity to compete on a neutral court with some of the top basketball programs in the country. Associated Press college basketball editor Jim O'Connell called the Maui Invitational "the best in-season tournament in the country – the standard by which all others are compared." Some 108 schools representing 26 conferences and 40 states have competed in the Invitational. Five times the winner has gone on to win the NCAA Men's Division I Basketball Championship later that season: Michigan in 1988, North Carolina three times—in 2004, 2008, and 2016, and UConn in 2010.

Of the eight teams which play in the tournament, generally there is one from each of the five major men's basketball conferences (the ACC, Big East [both before and after its 2013 split], Big Ten, Big 12, and the SEC, with the Pac-12 also in this group before that conference's 2024 collapse), one from another conference such as the American Conference, Conference USA, the Mountain West Conference or the Atlantic 10, and Chaminade. Beginning with the 2011 tournament, the field includes four additional mainland teams that play the Maui-bound teams at home. The four mainland teams will then play each other in regional games. The winner from each game will square off in the championship contest, preceded by the consolation game between the losers.

Beginning in 2018 and continuing with every even-numbered year, Chaminade will play games on the mainland, and eight Division I schools will compete in the championship bracket on Maui. In odd-numbered years, Chaminade will compete in the championship bracket.

Due to COVID-19 issues, the 2020 and 2021 tournaments were both moved to the US mainland. The 2020 event was held at Harrah's Cherokee Center in Asheville, North Carolina, while the 2021 event was held at Michelob Ultra Arena on the Las Vegas Strip.

Due to the city nearly being destroyed by a fire, it was announced on September 15, 2023 that the tournament games would be relocated to the island of O'ahu and be played at the Stan Sheriff Center on the campus of the University of Hawai‘i from Nov. 20 to 22. The tournament returned to Maui in 2024.

== Effect on local economy ==
Each year more than 4,000 out-of-state visitors—boosters, players, officials, team and game personnel, media representatives, sponsors, production crews and basketball fans—attend. The 2007 Maui Invitational Tournament ranked among Hawaii's top revenue-generating events, bolstering the local economy by more than $8 million according to financial data released by the Maui Visitors Bureau. The tournament has brought more than $110 million to Maui's economy since the tournament's debut in 1984 (through 2005).

== Yearly champions, runners-up, MVPs, & Locations ==
Year	Winner	Score	Opponent	Tournament MVP	Location
1984	Providence	60–58	Chaminade	Patrick Langlois, Chaminade	Lahaina Civic Center, Lahaina, HI
1985	Michigan	80–58	Kansas State	Dell Curry, Virginia Tech	Lahaina Civic Center, Lahaina, HI
1986	Vanderbilt	87–71	New Mexico	Will Perdue, Vanderbilt	Lahaina Civic Center, Lahaina, HI
1987	Iowa	97–74	Villanova	Entire Iowa Team	Lahaina Civic Center, Lahaina, HI
1988	Michigan	91–80	Oklahoma	Glen Rice, Michigan	Lahaina Civic Center, Lahaina, HI
1989	Missouri	80–73	North Carolina	Doug Smith, Missouri	Lahaina Civic Center, Lahaina, HI
1990	Syracuse	77–74	Indiana	Billy Owens, Syracuse	Lahaina Civic Center, Lahaina, HI
1991	Michigan State	86–61	Arkansas	George Gilmore, Chaminade	Lahaina Civic Center, Lahaina, HI
1992	Duke	89–66	BYU	Bobby Hurley, Duke; Penny Hardaway, Memphis State	Lahaina Civic Center, Lahaina, HI
1993	Kentucky	93–92	Arizona	Travis Ford, Kentucky	Lahaina Civic Center, Lahaina, HI
1994	Arizona State	97–90	Maryland	Mario Bennett, Arizona State	Lahaina Civic Center, Lahaina, HI
1995	Villanova	77–75	North Carolina	Kerry Kittles, Villanova	Lahaina Civic Center, Lahaina, HI
1996	Kansas	80–63	Virginia	Raef LaFrentz, Kansas	Lahaina Civic Center, Lahaina, HI
1997	Duke	95–87	Arizona	Steve Wojciechowski, Duke	Lahaina Civic Center, Lahaina, HI
1998	Syracuse	76–63	Indiana	Jason Hart, Syracuse	Lahaina Civic Center, Lahaina, HI
1999	North Carolina	90–75	Purdue	Joseph Forte, North Carolina	Lahaina Civic Center, Lahaina, HI
2000	Arizona	79–76	Illinois	Michael Wright, Arizona	Lahaina Civic Center, Lahaina, HI
2001	Duke	83–71	Ball State	Mike Dunleavy Jr., Duke	Lahaina Civic Center, Lahaina, HI
2002	Indiana	70–63	Virginia	Bracey Wright, Indiana	Lahaina Civic Center, Lahaina, HI
2003	Dayton	82–72	Hawaii	Keith Waleskowski, Dayton	Lahaina Civic Center, Lahaina, HI
2004	North Carolina	106–92	Iowa	Raymond Felton, North Carolina	Lahaina Civic Center, Lahaina, HI
2005	Connecticut	65–63	Gonzaga	Adam Morrison, Gonzaga	Lahaina Civic Center, Lahaina, HI
2006	UCLA	88–73	Georgia Tech	Darren Collison, UCLA	Lahaina Civic Center, Lahaina, HI
2007	Duke	77–73	Marquette	Kyle Singler, Duke	Lahaina Civic Center, Lahaina, HI
2008	North Carolina	102–87	Notre Dame	Ty Lawson, North Carolina	Lahaina Civic Center, Lahaina, HI
2009	Gonzaga	61–59*	Cincinnati	Matt Bouldin and Steven Gray, Gonzaga	Lahaina Civic Center, Lahaina, HI
2010	Connecticut	84–67	Kentucky	Kemba Walker, Connecticut	Lahaina Civic Center, Lahaina, HI
2011	Duke	68–61	Kansas	Ryan Kelly, Duke	Lahaina Civic Center, Lahaina, HI
2012	Illinois	78–61	Butler	Brandon Paul, Illinois	Lahaina Civic Center, Lahaina, HI
2013	Syracuse	74–67	Baylor	C. J. Fair, Syracuse	Lahaina Civic Center, Lahaina, HI
2014	Arizona	61–59	San Diego State	Stanley Johnson, Arizona	Lahaina Civic Center, Lahaina, HI
2015	Kansas	70–63	Vanderbilt	Wayne Selden Jr. and Frank Mason III, Kansas	Lahaina Civic Center, Lahaina, HI
2016	North Carolina	71–56	Wisconsin	Joel Berry II, North Carolina	Lahaina Civic Center, Lahaina, HI
2017	Notre Dame	67–66	Wichita State	Matt Farrell, Notre Dame	Lahaina Civic Center, Lahaina, HI
2018	Gonzaga	89–87	Duke	Rui Hachimura, Gonzaga	Lahaina Civic Center, Lahaina, HI
2019	Kansas	90–84*	Dayton	Udoka Azubuike and Devon Dotson, Kansas	Lahaina Civic Center, Lahaina, HI
2020	Texas	69–67	North Carolina	Matt Coleman III, Texas	Harrah's Cherokee Center, Asheville, NC
2021	Wisconsin	61–55	Saint Mary's	Johnny Davis, Wisconsin	Michelob Ultra Arena, Paradise, NV
2022	Arizona	81–79	Creighton	Oumar Ballo, Arizona	Lahaina Civic Center, Lahaina, HI
2023	Purdue	78–75	Marquette	Zach Edey, Purdue	Stan Sheriff Center, Honolulu, HI
2024	Auburn	90–76	Memphis	Johni Broome, Auburn	Lahaina Civic Center, Lahaina, HI
2025	USC	88–75	Arizona State	Chad Baker-Mazara, USC	Lahaina Civic Center, Lahaina, HI
2026	TBD	–	TBD		Lahaina Civic Center, Lahaina, HI

* Indicates game won in overtime

== Multiple appearances and championships ==
Team	Appearances	Championships	Years	Tournament Record
Chaminade	38	—	1984–2017, 2019, 2021, 2023, 2025	8–100 (.074)
Arizona	9	3	1993, 1997, 2000, 2005, 2009, 2014, 2018, 2022, 2026	18–8 (.692)
North Carolina	9	4	1989, 1995, 1999, 2004, 2008, 2012, 2016, 2020, 2024	24–6 (.800)
Kansas	8	3	1987, 1996, 2001, 2005, 2011, 2015, 2019, 2023	20–7 (.741)
Indiana	7	1	1990, 1994, 1998, 2002, 2008, 2015, 2020	13–9 (.591)
UCLA	7	1	1995, 2001, 2006, 2011, 2015, 2019, 2023	12–11 (.522)
Duke	6	5	1992, 1997, 2001, 2007, 2011, 2018	18–1 (.947)
Gonzaga	6	2	2002, 2005, 2009, 2013, 2018, 2023	14–5 (.737)
Memphis	6	—	1988, 1992, 1999, 2006, 2011, 2024	10–8 (.556)
Michigan	6	2	1985, 1988, 1994, 1998, 2011, 2017	14–5 (.737)
Michigan State	6	1	1991, 1995, 2005, 2010, 2019, 2024	12–6 (.667)
Arizona State	6	1	1991, 1994, 1998, 2002, 2007, 2025	10–8 (.556)
UConn	5	2	2000, 2005, 2010, 2016, 2024	9–5 (.643)
Dayton	5	1	2000, 2003, 2013, 2019, 2024	10–5 (.667)
Illinois	5	1	1987, 2000, 2007, 2012, 2018	11–7 (.611)
Kentucky	5	1	1993, 1997, 2002, 2006, 2010	10–5 (.667)
San Diego State	5	—	1989, 2003, 2014, 2018, 2022	9–8 (.529)
Texas	6	1	1993, 2004, 2008, 2012, 2020, 2025	12–7 (.632)
BYU	5	—	1992, 2004, 2014, 2019, 2026	8–6 (.571)
Vanderbilt	5	1	1986, 1988, 1995, 2009, 2015	11–5 (.688)
Arkansas	4	—	1991, 2005, 2013, 2022	7–6 (.538)
DePaul	4	—	1988, 1992, 1997, 2006	4–8 (.333)
Louisville	4	—	1989, 2000, 2004, 2022	5–7 (.417)
LSU	4	—	1992, 1996, 2007, 2017	4–8 (.333)
Marquette	4	—	2007, 2012, 2017, 2023	10–3 (.769)
Maryland	4	—	1994, 2000, 2005, 2009	6–6 (.500)
Missouri	4	1	1986, 1989, 1997, 2014	7–6 (.538)
Notre Dame	4	1	1993, 2008, 2017, 2021	8–5 (.615)
Ohio State	4	—	1988, 1993, 2003, 2022	8–4 (.667)
Oklahoma	4	—	1988, 1992, 2006, 2010	5–7 (.417)
Providence	4	1	1984, 1991, 2020, 2026	4–4 (.500)
Purdue	4	1	1999, 2006, 2014, 2023	12–3 (.800)
Stanford	4	—	1987, 1992, 2004, 2020	4–8 (.333)
Syracuse	4	3	1990, 1998, 2013, 2023	10–2 (.833)
Tennessee	4	—	2004, 2011, 2016, 2023	5–8 (.385)
UNLV	4	—	1988, 2000, 2015, 2020	6–7 (.462)
Virginia	4	—	1984, 1996, 2002, 2010	6–5 (.545)
Wisconsin	4	1	1995, 2009, 2016, 2021	9–5 (.643)
California	3	—	1996, 2013, 2017	5–6 (.455)
Georgetown	3	—	1999, 2011, 2016	5-5 (.500)
Iowa	3	1	1987, 1996, 2004	6–3 (.667)
Iowa State	3	—	1990, 2018, 2024	5–4 (.556)
Kansas State	3	—	1985, 1998, 2014	4–5 (.444)
Oregon	3	—	2008, 2016, 2021	5–5 (.500)
Santa Clara	3	—	1990, 1995, 2003	5–4 (.556)
USC	3	1	1999, 2012, 2025	5–4 (.556)
Utah	3	—	1994, 1998, 2002	4–5 (.444)
VCU	3	—	1986, 2017, 2026	2–4 (.333)
Villanova	3	1	1989, 1995, 2003	5–4 (.556)
Alabama	2	—	2008, 2020	4–2 (.667)
Arkansas State	2	—	1986, 2016	4–2 (.667)
Auburn	2	1	2018, 2024	5–1 (.833)
Baylor	2	—	1987, 2013	4–3 (.571)
Boston College	2	—	1993, 1997	3–3 (.500)
Butler	2	—	2012, 2021	3–3 (.500)
Cincinnati	2	—	2009, 2022	3–3 (.500)
Colorado	2	—	2019, 2024	2–4 (.333)
Davidson	2	—	1984, 2020	1–4 (.200)
Houston	2	—	2001, 2022	3–3 (.500)
Oklahoma State	2	—	2007, 2016	3–3 (.500)
Seton Hall	2	—	2001, 2025	3–3 (.500)
Texas A&M	2	—	1994, 2021	3–3 (.500)
Virginia Tech	2	—	1985, 2019	2–3 (.400)
Wichita State	2	—	2010, 2017	4–2 (.667)
Clemson	1	—	2026	0–0 (–)
Colorado State	1	—	2026	0–0 (–)
Ole Miss	1	—	2026	0–0 (–)
Washington	1	—	2026	0–0 (–)
Xavier	1	—	2018	1–2 (.333)

== Future tournament fields ==
=== 2026 ===
- Arizona
- BYU
- Clemson
- Colorado State
- Ole Miss
- Providence
- VCU
- Washington

=== 2027 ===
- Chaminade
- Georgetown
- Saint Mary's
- Saint Louis
- SMU
- Utah
- TBA
- TBA
