= 2013–14 Gonzaga Bulldogs men's basketball team =

American college basketball season

2013–14 Gonzaga Bulldogs men's basketball

WCC tournament champions WCC regular season champions

NCAA tournament, Round of 32
- Conference: West Coast Conference
- Record: 29–7 (15–3 WCC)
- Head coach: Mark Few (15th season)
- Assistant coaches: Tommy Lloyd (13th season); Donny Daniels (4th season); Brian Michaelson (1st season)
- Home arena: McCarthey Athletic Center

2013–14 West Coast Conference men's basketball standings
	Conf.				Overall
Team	W		L	PCT	W		L	PCT
Gonzaga †	15	–	3	.833	29	–	7	.806
BYU	13	–	5	.722	23	–	12	.657
San Francisco	13	–	5	.722	21	–	12	.636
Saint Mary's	11	–	7	.611	23	–	12	.657
Pepperdine	8	–	10	.444	15	–	16	.484
San Diego	7	–	11	.389	18	–	17	.514
Portland	7	–	11	.389	15	–	16	.484
Pacific	6	–	12	.333	18	–	16	.529
Santa Clara	6	–	12	.333	14	–	19	.424
Loyola Marymount	4	–	14	.222	13	–	19	.406
† Conference tournament winner

The 2013–14 Gonzaga Bulldogs men's basketball team represented Gonzaga University in the 2013–14 NCAA Division I men's basketball season. The team played its home games at the McCarthey Athletic Center, which has a capacity of 6,000. The Bulldogs (also informally referred to as the Zags) were in their 34th season as a member of the West Coast Conference, and were led by head coach Mark Few, who is in his 15th season as head coach. They finished the season 29–7, 15–3 in WCC play to be WCC regular season champions. They were also champions of the WCC tournament to earn an automatic bid to the NCAA tournament. In the NCAA Tournament, they defeated Oklahoma State in the second round before losing in the third round to Arizona.

== Preseason ==
In 2013–14, the Gonzaga Bulldogs men's basketball team is in its 34th season as a member of the West Coast Conference. Since 2004, the team has played their home games at the McCarthey Athletic Center, which has a capacity of 6,000. In their previous season, a West Coast Conference Preseason Poll predicted that the Bulldogs would finish atop of the conference. The Zags finished in first place in the West Coast Conference Standings with a 16–0 conference record. The Bulldogs beat Saint Mary's in the West Coast Conference tournament, and captured their first number one ranking in school history. The team drew its first number one seed in school history in the 2013 NCAA tournament, where they lost to ninth-seed Wichita State in the third round, 76–70, and finished with a record of 32–3.

During the 2013 off-season, former Zags player Adam Morrison returned to the school, apparently deciding to end an injury-riddled professional career, and was added to Mark Few's staff as a student assistant.

=== Departures ===
Name	Number	Pos.	Height	Weight	Year	Hometown	Reason for departure
Mike Hart	30	G	6'6'"	206	Senior (Redshirt)	Portland, OR	Graduated
Elias Harris	33	F	6'8"	239	Senior	Speyer, Germany	Graduated
Guy Landry Edi	10	F	6'6"	218	Senior	Agboville, Côte d'Ivoire	Graduated
Kelly Olynyk	13	F	7'0"	238	Junior (redshirt)	Kamloops, BC	Graduated; declared for 2013 NBA draft; selected 13th overall by the Dallas Mavericks

=== Incoming transfers ===
Name	Pos.	Height	Weight	Year	Hometown	Previous School	Years Remaining	Date Eligible
Kyle Wiltjer	F	6'10"	239	Junior	Portland, OR	Kentucky	2	Oct. 1, 2014

=== 2013 recruiting class ===
College recruiting information
Name	Hometown	School	Height	Weight	Commit date
Luke Meikle; PF	Tacoma, WA	Bellarmine Prep	6 ft 9 in (2.06 m)	203 lb (92 kg)	Apr 27, 2012
Luke Meikle; PF	Recruit ratings: Rivals: 247Sports: ESPN: (69)				
Ryan Edwards; C	Kalispell, MT	Glacier	7 ft 1 in (2.16 m)	290 lb (130 kg)	Jul 2, 2012
Ryan Edwards; C	Recruit ratings: ESPN: (69)				
Overall recruit ranking: Scout: nr Rivals: nr 247Sports: nr ESPN: nr
Note: In many cases, Scout, Rivals, 247Sports, On3, and ESPN may conflict in their listings of height and weight.; In these cases, the average was taken. ESPN grades are on a 100-point scale.; Sources: "2013 Gonzaga Rivals Commits". Rivals.; "2013 Gonzaga Scout Commits". Scout.; "2013 Gonzaga ESPN Commits". ESPN.; "Scout.com Team Recruiting Rankings". Scout.; "2013 Team Ranking". Rivals.

=== 2014 recruiting class ===
College recruiting information (2014)
Name	Hometown	School	Height	Weight	Commit date
Silas Melson; SG	Portland, OR	Jefferson	6 ft 3 in (1.91 m)	181 lb (82 kg)	Jun 18, 2013
Silas Melson; SG	Recruit ratings: Scout: Rivals: 247Sports: ESPN: (73)				
Josh Perkins; PG	Aurora, CO	Huntington Prep	6 ft 3 in (1.91 m)	186 lb (84 kg)	Aug 24, 2013
Josh Perkins; PG	Recruit ratings: Scout: Rivals: 247Sports: ESPN: (86)				
Bryan Alberts; SG	Northridge, CA	Village Christian	6 ft 5 in (1.96 m)	200 lb (91 kg)	Oct 28, 2013
Bryan Alberts; SG	Recruit ratings: Scout: Rivals: 247Sports: ESPN: (70)				
Domantas Sabonis; PF	Kaunas, Lithuania	Sunny View School	6 ft 10 in (2.08 m)	210 lb (95 kg)	Apr 17, 2014
Domantas Sabonis; PF	Recruit ratings: Scout: Rivals: 247Sports: ESPN: (N/A)				
Overall recruit ranking: Scout: N/A Rivals: N/A 247Sports: #14 ESPN: N/A
Note: In many cases, Scout, Rivals, 247Sports, On3, and ESPN may conflict in their listings of height and weight.; In these cases, the average was taken. ESPN grades are on a 100-point scale.; Sources: "2014 Gonzaga Rivals Commits". Rivals.; "2014 Gonzaga Scout Commits". Scout.; "2014 Gonzaga ESPN Commits". ESPN.; "Scout.com Team Recruiting Rankings". Scout.; "2014 Team Ranking". Rivals.; "2014 Gonzaga 24/7 Sports Commits". 247Sports.

=== 2015 recruiting class ===
College recruiting information (2015)
Name	Hometown	School	Height	Weight	Commit date
Jesse Wade; PG	Kaysville, UT	Davis	6 ft 1 in (1.85 m)	165 lb (75 kg)	Oct 4, 2013
Jesse Wade; PG	Recruit ratings: Scout: Rivals: 247Sports: ESPN: (80)				
Overall recruit ranking: Scout: N/A Rivals: N/A 247Sports: N/A ESPN: N/A
Note: In many cases, Scout, Rivals, 247Sports, On3, and ESPN may conflict in their listings of height and weight.; In these cases, the average was taken. ESPN grades are on a 100-point scale.; Sources: "2013 Gonzaga Rivals Commits". Rivals.; "2013 Gonzaga Scout Commits". Scout.; "2013 Gonzaga ESPN Commits". ESPN.; "Scout.com Team Recruiting Rankings". Scout.; "2013 Team Ranking". Rivals.; "2013 Gonzaga 24/7 Sports Commits". 247Sports.

== Roster ==
2013–14 Gonzaga Bulldogs men's basketball team
Players
Coaches

Pos.	#	Name	Height	Weight	Year	Previous school	Hometown
C	35	Sam Dower	6 ft 9 in (2.06 m)	243 lb (110 kg)	RS Sr	Osseo	Brooklyn Park, MN
G	11	David Stockton	5 ft 11 in (1.8 m)	165 lb (75 kg)	RS Sr	Gonzaga Prep	Spokane, WA
G	43	Drew Barham	6 ft 7 in (2.01 m)	200 lb (91 kg)	RS Sr	Christian Brothers; Memphis	Memphis, TN
G	22	Brian Bhaskar (W)	6 ft 2 in (1.88 m)	185 lb (84 kg)	Sr	Stevenson School	Monterey, CA
G	0	Gerard Coleman	6 ft 4 in (1.93 m)	170 lb (77 kg)	RS Jr	Tilton School (Tilton, NH); Providence	Boston, MA
G	5	Gary Bell Jr.	6 ft 2 in (1.88 m)	205 lb (93 kg)	Jr	Kentridge	Kent, WA
G	4	Kevin Pangos	6 ft 2 in (1.88 m)	180 lb (82 kg)	Jr	Denison Secondary	Newmarket, ON
F	33	Kyle Wiltjer (I) (redshirt)	6 ft 10 in (2.08 m)	230 lb (104 kg)	Jr	Jesuit; Kentucky	Portland, OR
F	2	Angel Nunez	6 ft 8 in (2.03 m)	200 lb (91 kg)	RS So	Notre Dame Prep (MA); Louisville	Bronx, NY
G	3	Kyle Dranginis	6 ft 5 in (1.96 m)	204 lb (93 kg)	RS So	Skyview	Nampa, ID
C	24	Przemek Karnowski	7 ft 1 in (2.16 m)	296 lb (134 kg)	So	Nicolaus Copernicus; Siarka Jezioro Tarnobrzeg	Toruń, Poland
G	15	Rem Bakamus (W) (redshirt)	6 ft 0 in (1.83 m)	165 lb (75 kg)	So	Mark Morris	Longview, WA
F	21	Luke Meikle	6 ft 9 in (2.06 m)	203 lb (92 kg)	Fr	Bellarmine Prep	Tacoma, WA
C	25	Ryan Edwards	7 ft 1 in (2.16 m)	290 lb (132 kg)	Fr	Glacier	Kalispell, MT
G	14	Connor Griffin (W)	6 ft 4 in (1.93 m)	205 lb (93 kg)	Fr	Lake Oswego	Lake Oswego, OR
G	40	Dustin Triano (W) (redshirt)	6 ft 3 in (1.91 m)	173 lb (78 kg)	Fr	New Hampton School (New Hampton, NH)	Vancouver, BC
G	23	Leo Roese (W) (redshirt)	6 ft 1 in (1.85 m)	184 lb (83 kg)	Fr	Timpview (Provo, UT)	São Paulo, Brazil

Head coach

- Mark Few, 15th yr. (Oregon, 1987)

Assistant coach(es)

- Tommy Lloyd, 13th yr. (Whitman, 1998)
- Donny Daniels, 4th yr. (Cal State Fullerton, 1976)
- Brian Michaelson, 1st yr. (Gonzaga, 2005)

Legend

- (C) Team captain
- (S) Suspended
- (I) Ineligible
- (W) Walk-on
- Injured
- Current redshirt

Roster

- Angel Nunez will have 2.5 years of eligibility remaining starting on December 21, 2013

== Schedule ==
Gonzaga played 18 conference games (home-and-home) during the season. The Zags played three non-conference games at the Maui Invitational. A fourth Maui Invitational game was played against Oakland in Spokane on November 17.

Date time, TV	Rank^{#}	Opponent^{#}	Result	Record	High points	High rebounds	High assists	Site (attendance) city, state
Exhibition
10/25/2013*; 6:00 pm, KHQ	No. 15	Simon Fraser	W 103–68	-	20 – Dower	12 – Dower	5 – Pangos	McCarthey Athletic Center (6,000); Spokane, WA
11/02/2013*	No. 15	vs. Texas; Secret Scrimmage	W –	-	–	–	–	GCU Arena (-); Phoenix, AZ
Regular Season
11/09/2013*; 4:00 pm, KHQ/RTNW	No. 15	Bryant	W 100–76	1–0	21 – Dower	17 – Dower	5 – Pangos	McCarthey Athletic Center (6,000); Spokane, WA
11/11/2013*; 6:00 pm, ESPNU	No. 15	Colorado State; ESPN College Hoops Tip-Off Marathon	W 93–61	2–0	24 – Bell	10 – Karnowski	4 – Stockton	McCarthey Athletic Center (6,000); Spokane, WA
11/17/2013*; 5:00 pm, KAYU/RTNW	No. 15	Oakland; Maui Invitational	W 82–67	3–0	21 – Pangos	6 – Karnowski	5 – Dranginis & Stockton	McCarthey Athletic Center (6,000); Spokane, WA
11/21/2013*; 6:00 pm, KHQ/RTNW	No. 13	Washington State	W 90–74	4–0	27 – Pangos	8 – Barham	9 – Stockton	McCarthey Athletic Center (6,000); Spokane, WA
11/25/2013*; 9:00 pm, ESPN2	No. 11	vs. Dayton; Maui Invitational First Round	L 79–84	4–1	27 – Pangos	7 – Dower	7 – Stockton	Lahaina Civic Center (2,400); Lahaina, HI
11/26/2013*; 1:30 pm, ESPN2	No. 11	vs. Chaminade; Maui Invitational Consolation Round	W 113–81	5–1	19 – Coleman, Dower	13 – Karnowski	7 – Pangos	Lahaina Civic Center (2,400); Lahaina, HI
11/27/2013*; 2:00 pm, ESPN2	No. 11	vs. Arkansas; Maui Invitational 5th Place Game	W 91–81	6–1	34 – Pangos	9 – Karnowski	6 – Dranginis, Stockton	Lahaina Civic Center (2,400); Lahaina, HI
12/01/2013*; 5:00 pm, KAYU/RTNW	No. 11	Coppin State	W 86–51	7–1	15 – Bell	8 – Dower, Karnowski	6 – Pangos	McCarthey Athletic Center (6,000); Spokane, WA
12/07/2013*; 8:00 pm, ESPNU	No. 19	New Mexico State	W 80–68	8–1	22 – Dower	9 – Karnowski, Pangos	6 – Pangos	McCarthey Athletic Center (6,000); Spokane, WA
12/10/2013*; 6:00 pm, ESPN	No. 20	at West Virginia	W 80–76	9–1	19 – Karnowski	13 – Karnowski	8 – Stockton	WVU Coliseum (9,350); Morgantown, WV
12/14/2013*; 7:00 pm, KHQ/RTNW	No. 20	vs. South Alabama; Battle in Seattle	W 68–59	10–1	20 – Bell	11 – Dower	4 – Pangos	KeyArena (9,140); Seattle, WA
12/21/2013*; 12:30 pm, ESPN2	No. 21	vs. Kansas State; Wichita Wildcat Classic	L 62–72	10–2	14 – Pangos	7 – Karnowski	6 – Pangos	INTRUST Bank Arena (13,224); Wichita, KS
12/28/2013; 5:00 pm, ESPNU	No. 24	Santa Clara	W 74–60	11–2 (1–0)	21 – Stockton	8 – Karnowski	4 – Dranginis	McCarthey Athletic Center (6,000); Spokane, WA
12/30/2013; 6:00 pm, KHQ/RTNW	No. 24	San Francisco	W 69–41	12–2 (2–0)	15 – Barham	9 – Barham	7 – Stockton	McCarthey Athletic Center (6,000); Spokane, WA
01/02/2014; 6:00 pm, ESPN2	No. 24	Saint Mary's	W 73–51	13–2 (3–0)	15 – Karnowski, Pangos	9 – Karnowski	4 – Dranginis, Pangos	McCarthey Athletic Center (6,000); Spokane, WA
01/04/2014; 5:00 pm, KAYU/RTNW	No. 24	Pacific	W 86–64	14–2 (4–0)	16 – Pangos & Barham	8 – Karnowski	7 – Dranginis	McCarthey Athletic Center (6,000); Spokane, WA
01/09/2014; 8:00 pm, ESPNU	No. 22	at Portland	L 73–82	14–3 (4–1)	14 – Dower	5 – Dranginis, Nunez	6 – Dranginis, Pangos	Chiles Center (4,714); Portland, OR
01/16/2014; 7:00 pm, KHQ/RTNW		at Pepperdine	W 70–43	15–3 (5–1)	18 – Dower	8 – Dranginis, Dower	4 – Pangos	Firestone Fieldhouse (3,092); Malibu, CA
01/18/2014; 1:00 pm, KHQ/RTNW		at Loyola Marymount	W 82–72	16–3 (6–1)	28 – Dower	14 – Dower	6 – Pangos	Gersten Pavilion (4,059); Los Angeles, CA
01/23/2014; 7:00 pm, ESPNU		San Diego	W 59–56	17–3 (7–1)	18 – Dower	10 – Dower	4 – Dranginis	McCarthey Athletic Center (6,000); Spokane, WA
01/25/2014; 7:00 pm, ESPN2		BYU	W 84–69	18–3 (8–1)	24 – Pangos	5 – Karnowski	7 – Pangos, Stockton	McCarthey Athletic Center (6,000); Spokane, WA
01/29/2014; 8:00 pm, SWX/RTNW		at Santa Clara	W 54–52	19–3 (9–1)	15 – Bell	8 – Karnowski	4 – Pangos	Leavey Center (4,721); Santa Clara, CA
02/01/2014; 7:00 pm, KHQ/RTNW		at San Francisco	W 75–65	20–3 (10–1)	24 – Dower	12 – Dranginis	2 – Pangos, Stockton	War Memorial Gymnasium (4,200); San Francisco, CA
02/05/2014; 8:00 pm, KHQ/RTNW	No. 23	Portland	W 71–66	21–3 (11–1)	13 – Pangos, Stockton, & Nunez	9 – Karnowski	5 – Stockton	McCarthey Athletic Center (6,000); Spokane, WA
02/08/2014*; 6:00 pm, ESPN	No. 23	at No. 24 Memphis; ESPN's College GameDay	L 54–60	21–4	18 – Dower	8 – Dower	4 – Stockton	FedExForum (18,248); Memphis, TN
02/13/2014; 6:00 pm, KHQ/RTNW		Pepperdine	W 83–68	22–4 (12–1)	18 – Pangos, Stockton	7 – Karnowski, Bell	5 – Stockton	McCarthey Athletic Center (6,000); Spokane, WA
02/15/2014; 5:00 pm, KAYU/RTNW		Loyola Marymount	W 86–67	23–4 (13–1)	25 – Dower	15 – Dower	5 – Stockton	McCarthey Athletic Center (6,000); Spokane, WA
02/20/2014; 8:00 pm, ESPN2	No. 25	at BYU	L 65–73	23–5 (13–2)	14 – Dower	8 – Dower	4 – Dranginis	Marriott Center (19,136); Provo, UT
02/22/2014; 9:00 pm, ESPN2	No. 25	at San Diego	L 66–69	23–6 (13–3)	18 – Dower	15 – Dower	5 – Stockton	Jenny Craig Pavilion (4,126); San Diego, CA
02/27/2014; 7:00 pm, ESPNU		at Pacific	W 70-53	24–6 (14–3)	18 – Pangos	9 – Karnowski	5 – Stockton	Alex G. Spanos Center (5,454); Stockton, CA
03/01/2014; 7:00 pm, ESPN2		at Saint Mary's	W 75–47	25–6 (15–3)	15 – Dower	10 – Dower	5 – Stockton	McKeon Pavilion (3,500); Moraga, CA
WCC Tournament
03/08/2014; 6:00 pm, ESPN2		vs. Santa Clara; Quarterfinals	W 77–75	26–6	23 – Dower	12 – Karnowski	4 – Stockton	Orleans Arena (7,898); Las Vegas, NV
03/10/2014; 6:00 pm, ESPN2		vs. Saint Mary's; Semifinals	W 70–54	27–6	21 – Stockton	9 – Dower	4 – Stockton	Orleans Arena (7,168); Las Vegas, NV
03/11/2014; 6:00 pm, ESPN		vs. BYU; Championship	W 75–64	28–6	20 – Dower	13 – Dower	7 – Stockton	Orleans Arena (7,898); Las Vegas, NV
NCAA tournament
03/21/2014*; 1:40 pm, TNT	No. (8 W)	vs. (9 W) Oklahoma State; Second round	W 85–77	29–6	26 – Pangos	10 – Karnowski	4 – Dower	Viejas Arena (11,196); San Diego, CA
03/23/2014*; 6:40, TBS	No. (8 W)	vs. No. 4 (1 W) Arizona; Third round	L 61–84	29–7	14 – Karnowski	10 – Karnowski	6 – Stockton	Viejas Arena (11,504); San Diego, CA
*Non-conference game. ^{#}Rankings from AP Poll, (#) during NCAA Tournament is seed within region W=West. (#) Tournament seedings in parentheses. All times are in Pacific Time.

== Game summaries ==
=== Exhibition: Simon Fraser ===
Broadcasters: Greg Heister, Richard Fox and Dan Dickau

KHQ

Oct 25
6:00 pm PDT

Recap

Simon Fraser Clan 68, Gonzaga Bulldogs 103
Scoring by half: 28-52, 40-51
Pts: David Gebru 14; Rebs: Justin Cole 7 Asts: Sango Niang 3	Pts: Sam Dower 20; Rebs: Sam Dower 12; Asts: Kevin Pangos 5

McCarthey Athletic Center
Spokane, WA
Attendance: 6,000
Referees: Mark Cook, Nate Harris, Justin Shamion

=== Bryant ===
Series History: First meeting
Broadcasters: Greg Heister, Richard Fox and Dan Dickau

KHQ/ROOT

Nov 9
4:00 pm PST

Recap

Bryant Bulldogs 76, Gonzaga Bulldogs 100
Scoring by half: 28-49, 48-51
Pts: Dyami Starks 35; Rebs: Corey Maynard, Joe O'Shea, Alex Francis, & Bosko Kostur 4 Asts: Alex Francis & Declan Soukup 2	Pts: Sam Dower 21; Rebs: Sam Dower 17; Asts: Kevin Pangos 5

McCarthey Athletic Center
Spokane, WA
Attendance: 6,000
Referees: Jimmy Casas, Mark Cook, Scott Brown

=== Colorado State ===
Series History: Tied 1–1
Broadcasters: Roxy Bernstein & Miles Simon

ESPNU

Nov 11
6:00 pm PDT

Recap

Colorado State Rams 61, Gonzaga Bulldogs 93
Scoring by half: 26-47, 35-46
Pts: Jon Octeus 27; Rebs: Marcus Holt 5 Asts: Joe De Ciman 3	Pts: Gary Bell 24; Rebs: Przemek Karnowski 10; Asts: David Stockton 4

McCarthey Athletic Center
Spokane, WA
Attendance: 6,000
Referees: Michael Irving, Frank Harvey, Tommy Nunez

=== Oakland ===
Series History: First meeting
Broadcasters: Greg Heister, Richard Fox & Dan Dickau

KAYU/ROOT

Nov 17
5:00 pm PST

Recap

Oakland Golden Grizzlies 67, Gonzaga Bulldogs 82
Scoring by half: 30-39, 37-43
Pts: Travis Bader 22; Rebs: Corey Petros 5 Asts: Khalil Felder 7	Pts: Kevin Pangos 21; Rebs: Przemek Karnowski 6 Asts: Kyle Dranginis & David Stockon 5

McCarthey Athletic Center
Spokane, WA
Attendance: 6,000
Referees: Michael Reed, Hoarace Shields, Casey McClellan

=== Washington State ===
Series History: Washington State leads 98–50
Broadcasters: Greg Heister, Richard Fox and Dan Dickau

KHQ/ROOT

Nov 21
6:00 pm PST

Recap

Washington State Cougars 74, Gonzaga Bulldogs 90
Scoring by half: 33-49, 41-41
Pts: Ike Iroegbu 20; Rebs: Ike Iroegbu 6 Asts: Ike Irogebu 4	Pts: Kevin Pangos 27; Rebs: Kevin Barham 8 Asts: David Stockton 9

McCarthey Athletic Center
Spokane, WA
Attendance: 6,000
Referees: Gregory Nixon, Kevin Brill, Tommy Nunez

=== Maui Invitational: Dayton ===
Series History: First meeting
Broadcasters: Sean McDonough and Jay Bilas

ESPN2

Nov 25
7:00 pm HAST

Recap

Dayton Flyers 84, Gonzaga Bulldogs 79
Scoring by half: 28-37, 56-42
Pts: Jordan Siebert 23; Rebs: Dyshawn Pierre & Devon Scott 9 Asts: Devin Oliver 3	Pts: Kevin Pangos 27; Rebs: Sam Dower 7 Asts: David Stockon 7

Lahaina Civic Center
Maui, HI
Attendance: 2,400
Referees: Ed Corbett, Mark Whitehead, Dwayne Gladden

=== Maui Invitational: Chaminade ===
Series History: Gonzaga leads 1–0
Broadcasters: Jon Sciambi and Jimmy Dykes

ESPN2

Nov 26
11:30 am HAST

Recap

Gonzaga Bulldogs 113, Chaminade Silverswords 81
Scoring by half: 58-40, 55-41
Pts: Sam Dower & Gerard Coleman 19; Rebs: Przemek Karnowski 13; Asts: Kevin Pangos 7	Pts: Lee Bailey 29; Rebs: Lee Bailey & Kevin Hu 5 Asts: Tyree Harrison, Kevin Hu, & AJ Mathew 1

Lahaina Civic Center
Maui, HI
Attendance: 2,400
Referees: Chris Rastatter, Dwayne Gladden, Tim Kelly

=== Maui Invitational: Arkansas ===
Series History: First Meeting
Broadcasters: Jon Sciambi and Jimmy Dykes

ESPN2

Nov 27
12:00 pm HAST

Recap

Arkansas Razorbacks 81, Gonzaga Bulldogs 91
Scoring by half: 31-38, 50-53
Pts: Bobby Portis 18; Rebs: Bobby Portis & Moses Kingsley 7 Asts: Fred Gulley & Rashad Madden 3	Pts: Kevin Pangos 34; Rebs: Przemek Karnowski 9 Asts: David Stockton & Kyle Dranginis 6

Lahaina Civic Center
Maui, HI
Attendance: 2,400
Referees: Terry Wymer, Kevin Brill, D.J. Carstensen

=== Coppin State ===
Series History: First meeting
Broadcasters: Greg Heister, Richard Fox and Dan Dickau

KAYU/ROOT

Dec 1
5:00 pm PST

Recap

Coppin State Eagles 51, Gonzaga Bulldogs 86
Scoring by half: 14-39, 37-47
Pts: Arnold Fripp & Sterling Smith 10; Rebs: Taariq Cephas 10; Asts: Taariq Cephas 3	Pts: Gary Bell 15; Rebs: Przemek Karnowski & Sam Dower 8 Asts: Kevin Pangos 6

McCarthey Athletic Center
Spokane, WA
Attendance: 6,000
Referees: Mark Cook, Nate Harris, Justin Shamion

=== New Mexico State ===
Series History: First Meeting
Broadcasters: Steve Quis and Jon Crispin

ESPNU

Dec 7
8:00 pm PST

Recap

New Mexico State Aggies 68, Gonzaga Bulldogs 80
Scoring by half: 30-31, 38-49
Pts: Daniel Mullings 17; Rebs: Tshilidzi Nephawe 8 Asts: Daniel Mullings 5	Pts: Sam Dower 22; Rebs: Kevin Pangos & Przemek Karnowski 8 Asts: Kevin Pangos 6

McCarthey Athletic Center
Spokane, WA
Attendance: 6,000
Referees: Frank Harvey, Gregory Nixon, Klaus Endrissat

=== West Virginia ===
Series History: Gonzaga leads series 2–0
Broadcasters: Roxy Bernstein and Sean Farnham

ESPN

Dec 10
9:00 pm EST

Recap

Gonzaga Bulldogs 80, West Virginia Mountaineers 76
Scoring by half: 35-39, 45-37
Pts: Przemek Karnowski 19; Rebs: Przemek Karnowski 13; Asts: David Stockton 8	Pts: Eron Harris 23; Rebs: Devin Williams & Juwan Staten 9 Asts: Juwan Staten & Eron Harris 3

WVU Coliseum
Morgantown, WV
Attendance: 9,350
Referees: Joe DeRosa, Mike Stuart, Kipp Kissinger

=== South Alabama ===
Series History: Gonzaga leads series 2–0
Broadcasters: Greg Heister, Richard Fox, and Brad Adam

KHQ/ROOT

Dec 14
7:00 pm PST

Recap

South Alabama Jaguars 59, Gonzaga Bulldogs 68
Scoring by half: 25-41, 34-27
Pts: Augustine Rubit 35; Rebs: Barrington Stevens 8 Asts: Barrington Stevens 4	Pts: Gary Bell 20; Rebs: Sam Dower 11; Asts: Kevin Pangos 4

KeyArena
Seattle, WA
Attendance: 9,140
Referees: Frank Harvey, Gregory Nixon, Klaus Endrissat

=== Wichita Wildcat Classic: Kansas State ===
Series History: Kansas State leads series 2–1
Broadcasters: Carter Blackburn and Sean Farnham

ESPN2

Dec 21
2:30 pm CST

Recap

Gonzaga Bulldogs 62, Kansas State Wildcats 72
Scoring by half: 24-29, 38-43
Pts: Kevin Pangos 14; Rebs: Przemek Karnowski 7 Asts: Kevin Pangos 6	Pts: Thomas Gipson & Marcus Foster 14; Rebs: Wesley Iwundu, Thomas Gipson, & D.J. Johnson 3 Asts: Shane Southwell 6

Intrust Bank Arena
Wichita, KS
Attendance: 13,224
Referees: Rick Hartzell, Terry Davis, Toby Martinez

=== Santa Clara ===
Series History: Gonzaga leads series 49–30
Broadcasters: Roxy Bernstein and Miles Simon

ESPNU

Dec 28
5:00 pm PST

Recap

Santa Clara Broncos 60, Gonzaga Bulldogs 74
Scoring by half: 26-31, 34-43
Pts: Brandon Clark 22; Rebs: Yannick Atanga 9 Asts: Evan Roquemore 3	Pts: David Stockton 21; Rebs: Przemek Karnowski 8 Asts: Kyle Dranginis 4

McCarthey Athletic Center
Spokane, WA
Attendance: 6,000
Referees: Glen Mayberry, Klaus Andrissat, Dennis Flannery

=== San Francisco ===
Series History: Gonzaga leads series 46–22
Broadcasters: Greg Hesiter and Richard Fox

KHQ/RTNW

Dec 30
6:00 pm PST

Recap

San Francisco Dons 41, Gonzaga Bulldogs 69
Scoring by half: 23-41, 18-28
Pts: Avry Holmes 16; Rebs: Kruize Pinkins 10; Asts: Adams Chris & Kruize Pinkins 3	Pts: Drew Barham 15; Rebs: Drew Barham 9 Asts: David Stockton 7

McCarthey Athletic Center
Spokane, WA
Attendance: 6,000
Referees: Michael Greenstein, Michael Reed, Richard Batsell

=== Saint Mary's ===
Series History: Gonzaga leads series 57–27
Broadcasters: Dave Flemming and Sean Farnham

ESPN2

Jan 2
6:00 pm PST

Recap

Saint Mary's Gaels 51, Gonzaga Bulldogs 73
Scoring by half: 22-36, 29-37
Pts: Beau Levesque 12; Rebs: Brad Waldow, Beau Levesque, James Walker III, & Dane Pineau 3 Asts: Jordan Giusti & Matt Hodgson 1	Pts: Kevin Pangos & Przemek Karnowski 15; Rebs: Przemek Karnowski 9 Asts: Kyle Dranginis & Kevin Pangos 4

McCarthey Athletic Center
Spokane, WA
Attendance: 6,000
Referees: Gregory Nixon, Tommy Nunez, Michael Scyphers

=== Pacific ===
Series History: Gonzaga leads series 3–1
Broadcasters: Greg Hesiter and Richard Fox

KAYU/RTNW

Jan 4
5:00 pm PST

Pacific Tigers 64, Gonzaga Bulldogs 86
Scoring by half: 25-46, 39-40
Pts: David Taylor 11; Rebs: TJ Wallace 6 Asts: Trevin Harris, Sama Taku, TJ Wallace, & Aaron Short 2	Pts: Kevin Pangos & Drew Barham 16; Rebs: Przemek Karnowski 8 Asts: Kyle Dranginis 7

McCarthey Athletic Center
Spokane, WA
Attendance: 6,000
Referees: Kevin Brill, Marc Beasley, Bruce Hicks

=== Portland ===
Series History: Gonzaga leads series 91-65
Broadcasters: Roxy Bernstein and Jarron Collins

ESPNU

Jan 9
8:00 pm PST

Recap

Gonzaga Bulldogs 73, Portland Pilots 82
Scoring by half: 31-39, 42-43
Pts: Sam Dower 14; Rebs: Angel Nunez & Kyle Dranginis 5 Asts: Kyle Dranginis & Kevin Pangos 6	Pts: Bryce Pressley 16; Rebs: Ryan Nicholas 9 Asts: Bryce Pressley 4

Chiles Center
Portland, OR
Attendance: 4,714
Referees: Frank Harvey, Glen Mayberry, James Giron

== Rankings ==
Ranking movement Legend: ██ Increase in ranking. ██ Decrease in ranking. ██ Not ranked the previous week. RV=Others receiving votes.
Poll	Pre	Wk 2	Wk 3	Wk 4	Wk 5	Wk 6	Wk 7	Wk 8	Wk 9	Wk 10	Wk 11	Wk 12	Wk 13	Wk 14	Wk 15	Wk 16	Wk 17	Wk 18	Wk 19	Wk 20	Final
AP	15	15	13	11	19	20	21	24	24	22	RV	RV	RV	23	RV	25	RV	RV	RV	RV	N/A
Coaches	14	15	12	10	15	16	15	21	21	18	24	21	24	20	24	22	RV	RV	RV	RV	RV

== See also ==
2013–14 Gonzaga Bulldogs women's basketball team
