= 2024–25 Michigan State Spartans men's basketball team =

American college basketball season

2024–25 Michigan State Spartans men's basketball

Big Ten regular season champions

NCAA tournament, Elite Eight
- Conference: Big Ten Conference

Ranking
- Coaches: No. 7
- AP: No. 7
- Record: 30–7 (17–3 Big Ten)
- Head coach: Tom Izzo (30th season)
- Associate head coach: Doug Wojcik (6th overall season)
- Assistant coaches: Thomas Kelley (3rd season); Saddi Washington (1st season); Jon Borovich (1st season); Austin Thornton (1st season)
- Captains: Tre Holloman; Jaden Akins
- Home arena: Breslin Center

2024–25 Big Ten Conference men's basketball standings
	Conf.				Overall
Team	W		L	PCT	W		L	PCT
No. 7 Michigan State	17	–	3	.850	30	–	7	.811
No. 9 Maryland	14	–	6	.700	27	–	9	.750
No. 10 Michigan †	14	–	6	.700	27	–	10	.730
UCLA	13	–	7	.650	23	–	11	.676
No. 16 Wisconsin	13	–	7	.650	27	–	10	.730
No. 14 Purdue	13	–	7	.650	24	–	12	.667
Illinois	12	–	8	.600	22	–	13	.629
Oregon	12	–	8	.600	25	–	10	.714
Indiana	10	–	10	.500	19	–	13	.594
Ohio State	9	–	11	.450	17	–	15	.531
Rutgers	8	–	12	.400	15	–	17	.469
Minnesota	7	–	13	.350	15	–	17	.469
Northwestern	7	–	13	.350	17	–	16	.515
USC	7	–	13	.350	17	–	18	.486
Iowa	7	–	13	.350	17	–	16	.515
Nebraska	7	–	13	.350	21	–	14	.600
Penn State	6	–	14	.300	16	–	15	.516
Washington	4	–	16	.200	13	–	18	.419
† 2025 Big Ten tournament winner Rankings from AP poll

The 2024–25 Michigan State Spartans men's basketball team represented Michigan State University in the 2024–25 NCAA Division I men's basketball season. The Spartans were led by 30th-year head coach Tom Izzo and played their home games at Breslin Center in East Lansing, Michigan as members of the Big Ten Conference.

With a win over Oregon on February 8, 2025, Tom Izzo tied Bob Knight for the most wins in conference history with 353. With a win over Illinois on February 15, Izzo passed Knight for the most wins in conference history.

With a loss by rival Michigan on March 5, the Spartans secured at least a share of the Big Ten regular season championship, their first since 2020. The championship was Izzo's 11th, tying him for the all-time record with Knight and former Purdue coach Ward Lambert. With a win over Iowa on March 6, MSU secured the outright regular season championship. The championship marked the team's first outright championship since 2018. With a win over Michigan in the regular season finale on March 9, MSU earned its 17th conference win on the season, the most conference wins in school history. The Spartans finished three games ahead of second-place Maryland and Michigan in the conference. The Spartans defeated Oregon in the quarterfinals of the Big Ten tournament before losing to Wisconsin. They received an at-large bid to the NCAA tournament as the No. 2 seed in the South region marking the school's 27th consecutive tournament appearance, the nation's longest active streak. They defeated Bryant in the first round and New Mexico in the second round to advance to the Sweet Sixteen. It marked the 16th Sweet Sixteen appearance under Izzo and the school's 22nd overall. MSU defeated Ole Miss to advance to the Elite Eight where they were defeated by overall No. 1 seed Auburn. They finished the season 30–7, 17–3 in Big Ten play.

The Big Ten named Tom Izzo the conference's coach of the year for the fourth time. Freshman Jase Richardson was named to the All-Big Ten third team and the All-Freshman team. Jaden Akins was named to the All-Defensive team and the coaches' third team. Associate head coach Doug Wojcik was named the Howard Moore assistant coach of the year.

The Michigan State Spartans drew an average home attendance of 14,797, the 16th-highest of all college basketball teams.

== Previous season ==
The Spartans finished the 2023–24 season 20–15, 10–10 in Big Ten play to finish in a three-way tie for sixth place. As the No. 8 seed in the Big Ten tournament, MSU defeated Minnesota in the second round before losing to top-seeded Purdue in the quarterfinals. The Spartans received an at-large bid to the NCAA Tournament as the No. 9 seed in the West region, extending Izzo's record-setting streak to 26 straight tournament appearances. They defeated Mississippi State in the first round before losing to No. 1-seeded North Carolina. The Spartans were led by Tyson Walker who averaged 18.4 points per game and Malik Hall who averaged 12.7 points and 5.7 rebounds per game.

== Offseason ==
=== Coaching changes ===
On April 3, 2024, assistant coach Mark Montgomery was named the head coach at Detroit Mercy. On June 6, Tom Izzo announced that former Michigan assistant coach Saddi Washington had been named an assistant coach with the Spartans. Izzo also announced that assistant coach Doug Wojcik had been promoted to associate head coach. Recruiting director Jon Borovich and video coordinator Austin Thornton were elevated to assistant coaches.

=== Departures ===
On April 4, senior center Mady Sissoko announced he had entered the transfer portal. On April 29, Sissoko announced he would transfer to California. On April 18, Tom Izzo confirmed that senior point guard A. J. Hoggard would not return for his fifth year at MSU. On May 18, Hoggard announced he would transfer to Vanderbilt.

Departures
Name	No.	Pos.	Height	Weight	Year	Hometown	Notes
Malik Hall	25	F	6'8"	225	GS	Aurora, IL	Graduated
A. J. Hoggard	11	G	6'4"	210	Sr	Coatesville, PA	Graduated/Transfer to Vanderbilt
Mady Sissoko	22	F	6'9"	250	Sr	Bafoulabé. Mali	Transfer to California
Tyson Walker	2	G	6'0"	175	GS	Westbury, NY	Graduated

=== Incoming transfers ===
On April 23, 2024, Omaha small forward Frankie Fidler announced he would transfer to Michigan State. This marked he first time since 2021 that the Spartans had a transfer join the team – MSU being one of the few schools to not accept many transfers in the new transfer portal era. Fidler averaged 20.1 points and 6.3 rebounds per game with Omaha in the 2023–24 season. On May 14, Longwood center Szymon Zapala announced he will transfer to Michigan State. Zapala spent three years at Utah State before playing at Longwood in the 2023–24 season.

Transfers
Name	No.	Pos.	Height	Weight	Year	Hometown	Previous school
Frankie Fidler	8	SF	6'7"	205	Sr	Bellevue, NE	Omaha
Szymon Zapala	10	C	7'0"	240	GS	Zaborze, Poland	Longwood

=== Recruiting class ===
On April 3, 2023, four-star shooting guard Kur Teng committed to MSU for the 2024 season. On April 20, four-star center Jesse McCulloch announced he too would play for MSU in 2024. On October 15, four-star shooting guard Jase Richardson, son of former MSU star Jason Richardson, announced he would join the Spartans in 2024. Richardson became the first son of a player who played for Izzo as head coach to commit to MSU.

College recruiting
Name	Hometown	School	Height	Weight	Commit date
Jesse McCulloch; C	Cleveland, OH	Lutheran High School East	6 ft 9 in (2.06 m)	190 lb (86 kg)	April 20, 2023 (verbal)
Jesse McCulloch; C	Recruit ratings: Rivals: 247Sports: (82)				
Jase Richardson; SG	Miami, FL	Columbus High School	6 ft 3 in (1.91 m)	180 lb (82 kg)	October 15, 2023 (verbal)
Jase Richardson; SG	Recruit ratings: Rivals: 247Sports: (88)				
Kur Teng; SG	Manchester, NH	Bradford Christian Academy	6 ft 4 in (1.93 m)	165 lb (75 kg)	April 3, 2023 (verbal)
Kur Teng; SG	Recruit ratings: Rivals: 247Sports: (87)				
Overall recruit ranking:
Note: In many cases, Scout, Rivals, 247Sports, On3, and ESPN may conflict in their listings of height and weight.; In these cases, the average was taken. ESPN grades are on a 100-point scale.; Sources:

=== Spain trip ===
The Spartans team took a team-building trip to Spain in August 2024 to play exhibition games against various teams "representing Spain." They played games in Madrid, Valencia, and Barcelona. MSU won their first two games while losing the third against KK FMP, a Serbian professional team.

== Preseason ==
=== Preseason Big Ten polls ===
Michigan State was picked to finish in fifth place in the conference by an annual, unofficial preseason poll of basketball writers. They received one first place vote. No Spartan was named to the conference's preseason All-Big Ten team.

=== Preseason rankings ===
The Spartans were not ranked in the preseason AP poll, but they did receive votes. Michigan State was also unranked in the preseason coaches poll, but did receive votes.

=== Jersey patch ===
The Spartans announced they would wear a "JF" patch on their uniforms during the season to honor former university trustee Joel I. Ferguson.

=== Exhibition games ===
The Spartans played an exhibition game at Tom Izzo's alma mater, Division II Northern Michigan, on October 13, 2024. Prior to the game, Izzo had his jersey retired by Northern Michigan. The game, played in the football team's Superior Dome, was won by the Spartans 70–53. Jase Richardson led the Spartans with 11 points while Xavier Booker added 10. Jaxon Kohler nabbed eight rebounds and scored nine in the win.

The Spartans played a second exhibition game at Breslin Center on October 29 against Ferris State. Frankie Fidler led the Spartans with 14 points, 12 of which came in the first half, as MSU won 85–67. Jaxon Kohler led the Spartans with 11 rebounds while Xavier Booker added 10 points in the win.

== Regular season ==
=== Early non-conference games ===
==== Monmouth ====
The Spartans opened the season on November 4 against Monmouth at Breslin Center. Jaden Akins led the Spartans with 23 points while freshman Jase Richardson was the only other Spartan in double figures in scoring with 10 points. 11 different Spartans played over 10 minutes in the game as MSU won easily 81–57. Akins led the Spartans with nine rebounds and Jeremy Fears Jr. had eight assists in the win. MSU only made three of 18 three-point attempts in the game. The win moved MSU to 1–0 on the season.

==== Niagara ====
The Spartans next faced Niagara on November 7. Jaxon Kohler set career highs for points and rebounds, 20 and 13 respectively, as MSU blew out the Purple Eagles 96–60. Jeremy Fears Jr. led the Spartans with 13 assists as four Spartans scored in double figures in the win. MSU improved their three-point shooting, making six of 18 shots in the win. The win moved MSU to 2–0 on the season.

==== Kansas ====
The Spartans faced No. 1-ranked Kansas as part of the Champions Classic on November 12 in Atlanta. MSU fell behind early, trailing 6–0. However, the Spartans rallied and kept the game close throughout the half and were within six at the break. Jase Richardson hit a three-pointer with a second left in the first half and was fouled to further narrow the lead. Frankie Fidler led the Spartans with 15 points, including 8–8 from the free throw line. Jaxon Kohler added 12 points and 10 rebounds, but the Spartans lost 77–69. Again, MSU had 10 players play at least 12 minutes in the game, but only Fidler and Kohler scored in double digits. MSU shot poorly from three again in the game, making only three of 24 attempts. The loss dropped MSU to 2–1 on the season.

==== Bowling Green ====
MSU returned home to face Bowling Green on November 16. The Spartans trailed throughout the first half, but were able to tie the game at 43 at half time. However, MSU fell behind again in the second half, trailing by as many at eight. The Falcons took at 72–68 lead with 7:11 left in the game. However, MSU shut out the Falcons from there, finishing on an 18–0 run to end the game and win by 14. Jaden Akins led the Spartans with 23 points, 12 rebounds, and six assists. Six other Spartans scored in double figures in the win. MSU's three-point shooting continued to struggle as the Spartans made only four of 20 shots from three. The win moved MSU to 3–1 on the season.

==== Samford ====
The Spartans played Samford on November 19 at Breslin Center. MSU again fell behind early and trailed by as many 13 in the first 10 minutes. However, the Spartans rallied and took the lead with a little more than four minutes left in the half, outscoring the Bulldogs 13–3 to end the half. Samford refused to go away in the second half however as MSU never led by more than 13. The Spartans, who continued to struggle shooting the ball, held on for the 83–75 win. Jaden Akins led the Spartans with 25 points while Jase Richardson and Frankie Fidler added 12 each. The Spartans made seven of 24 three-pointers.

==== Maui Invitational ====
===== Colorado =====
MSU next traveled the Maui Invitational to play Colorado in the first game on November 25. The Spartans continued to struggle from three, making only two of 21 three-point attempts. Despite this, the Spartans shot 50% from the field as they controlled the game against the Buffaloes. Leading by 13 at the half and by as many as 19 in the second half, MSU won easily 72–56. Jase Richardson led the Spartans with 13 points while no other Spartans scored in double figures. However, 10 Spartans scored in the win. The win moved the Spartans to 5–1 on the season.

===== Memphis =====
The Spartans faced Memphis in the semifinals of the Maui Invitational on November 26. The Spartans kept the game close throughout the first half and exchanged the lead for the first eight minutes of the game. However, they trailed by three at half time. Memphis took control of the game in the second half, leading by as many as 15 on a couple of occasions while MSU brought the lead down to seven. However, the Spartans, who made seven of 20 three-pointers, could not come any closer as they lost for the second time on the season. The Spartans shot only 63% from the free throw line in the 71–63 loss. Jase Richardson led the Spartans with 18 points while Jaden Akins added 12. Richardson did take an elbow to the head in the game, but did not leave the game. The loss dropped MSU to 5–2 on the season.

===== North Carolina =====
In the third-place game, the Spartans faced No. 12 North Carolina the next day. It was announced before the game that Jase Richardson would not play after developing symptoms after taking an elbow to the head the day before. Tre Holloman got the start in place of Frankie Fidler and led the Spartans with a career-high 19 points including three of six three-pointers and six-for-six from the free throw line. MSU only made one other three in the game (from Fidler) and shot 25% from three. The Spartans led throughout the first half, pushing the lead to as many as 12 on several occasions. Holloman hit a three as time expired in the first half, but a review showed he did not get the shot off before the shot clock had expired, so the Spartans only led 43–34 at the break. The Tar Heels quickly tightened the lead in the second, but MSU remained in the lead throughout the half and held an eight-point lead with just over four minutes left in the game. However, they were outscored 11–1 to finish regulation with UNC hitting a three to tie the game and force overtime. In overtime, the team's exchanged leads until MSU was able to hold on as Xavier Booker and Holloman combined for eight points in overtime in the 94–91 win. The win moved MSU to 6–2 on the season.

=== Early conference games ===
==== Minnesota ====
The Spartans next traveled to face Minnesota on December 4 in their first conference game of the year. MSU started well, taking an early lead before Minnesota rallied to take the lead. However, after the game was tied with 12 minutes left in the half, the Spartans took control and never trailed again. They led by 12 at the half and by as many as 21 in the second half on their way to an easy 90–72 win. MSU shot 50% from three, making 11 three-pointers. 12 players played and all scored for the Spartans in the win. Coen Carr led the Spartans with 12 points while three other Spartans scored in double figures. Jaxon Kohler notched a double-double with 11 points and 11 rebounds. Jase Richardson returned to the lineup and added four points and four assists. Tre Holloman scored eight with eight assists in the easy win. The win moved MSU to 7–2 on the season and 1–0 in conference play.

==== Nebraska ====
The Spartans returned to Breslin to play Nebraska on December 7. MSU took the early lead in their second conference game and never trailed. Nebraska kept it close in the first half, but the Spartans led by 10 at half time. However, in the second half, the Spartans blew the game open, pulling ahead and leading by as many as 42. MSU made nine of 23 three-pointers and shot 51% from the field in the game while limiting Nebraska to 33% from the field. Jaden Akins led all scorers with 18 while Jase Richardson added 16. Ten different Spartans scored while Jaxon Kohler had a game-high 12 rebounds. The Spartans dominated the Cornhuskers on the glass, outrebounding them 48–19 as MSU won easily 89–52. The win marked the team's second largest conference win in school history. The win moved the Spartans to 8–2 and 2–0 on the season.

=== Remaining non-conference games ===
==== Oakland ====
After 10 days off, the Spartans faced Oakland in Little Caesars Arena in Detroit. The Spartans struggled early with the Golden Grizzlies' zone and led by one at the half. In the second half, they were able to pull away as Xavier Booker scored a career-high 18 points while Jaden Akins added 16. The lead ballooned to more than 20 late and the Spartans won easily 77–58. MSU continued its strong free throw shooting on the season, making 19 of 23 free throws and shot 43% from the field in the win. Jaxon Kohler scored 15 and added 10 rebounds in the win. The Spartans moved to 9–2 on the season. Tom Izzo and Oakland coach Greg Kampe work matching Grinch sweaters on the sidelines during the game.

==== Florida Atlantic ====
The newly ranked Spartans (No. 20 in AP, 18 in Coaches) returned home to face Florida Atlantic on December 21. The Owls kept the game close through the first 16 minutes, but the Spartans pushed the lead to 13 at the half. Coen Carr had a career day, scoring 17 points on several highlight dunks and making his first career three pointer in the second half. MSU controlled the game in the second half and won easily 86–69. Carr added eight rebounds while Jaxon Kohler notched a game-high 12. Jeremy Fears Jr. dished out eight assists while committing only one turnover in the win. The Spartans moved to 10–2 on the season.

==== Western Michigan ====
MSU, now ranked 18th in both polls, played Western Michigan, led by former Izzo assistant Dwayne Stephens, on December 30. The Spartans took the lead about six minutes in to the game and never relinquished it. However, they never led by more than 11 until less than four minutes were left in the game. Jaden Akins led the Spartans with 18 points while Carson Cooper scored a career-high 13. No other Spartan scored more than nine points though 11 players did score for MSU. Szymon Zapala led the Spartans with nine rebounds while both Tre Holloman and Jeremy Fears Jr. each had six assists. Both teams turned the ball over 17 times as MSU pulled away for the 80–62 win. In their final non-conference game of the season, MSU shot 50% from the floor and continued their strong free throw shooting, making more than 90% of their free throws in the win. The win moved the Spartans to 11–2 on the season.

=== Remaining conference games ===
==== Ohio State ====
The Spartans returned to conference play and to the road to face Ohio State on January 3, 2025. The game remained close throughout the first half, but the Spartans were able to pull ahead and take a 37–29 lead at the half. They continued to increase the lead early in the second half as Szymon Zapala scored a season-high 15 points to lead MSU to a 12-point lead with less than 15 minutes remaining. However, the Buckeyes rallied to take the lead with less than nine minutes remaining. However, MSU responded with Xavier Booker going end-to-end to score on a three-point play. Tre Holloman added a three-pointer before a Booker dunk extend the lead to seven. MSU held on from there for the 69–62 win. Jaden Akins added 14 points while Coen Carr notched 11 in the win. The win, the Spartans seventh in a row, moved MSU to 12–2, 3–0 on the season.

==== Washington ====
The newly ranked No. 16 Spartans faced Big Ten newcomer Washington on January 9. The Spartans manhandled the Huskies, jumping out to a 16–1 lead in the first nine minutes. MSU led 42–13 at the half. Washington, after scoring only 13 in the first half, scored 41 in the second half, but the Spartans added 46 in the half to win 88–54. The Spartans limited the Huskies to only 32% from the field and allowed only three three-pointers. MSU shot over 52% in the game and hit 17 of 18 free throws in the blowout. Jaden Akins led the Spartans with 20 points while Jase Richardson and Jeremy Fears Jr. added 12 each. Fears notched his first career double-double, adding 10 assists to his 12 points. The win moved MSU to 13–2 on the season while remaining unbeaten in conference play at 4–0.

==== Northwestern ====
Three days later, MSU traveled to face Northwestern. The Spartans started slow, trailing for most of the first six minutes, but went on a 33–12 to run for the remainder of the first half to take control of the game. MSU let by as many as 23 in the first half and 19 at halftime. In the second half, the Wildcats fought back, but only got within eight as the Spartans held on for another easy win, 78–68. MSU shot relatively poorly from the free throw line, making only 20 of 27 attempts. They did shoot 50% from three, making four of eight shots in the win. Jeremy Fears Jr again played well, scoring 12 points while adding eight assists. Jaden Akins led the Spartans again with 14 points while Jase Richardson added 13. The win kept MSU undefeated in conference play at 5–0 and pushed them to 14–2 overall.

==== Penn State ====
The Spartans, now ranked No. 12 in the country, returned home to face Penn State on January 15. The Spartans never trailed in the game, but never pushed the lead to more than 11 points. Frankie Fidler played well, leading the Spartans with 18 points and seven rebounds in the game. Jaden Akins added 16 points and six rebounds. Eight of the 10 Spartans who played scored seven or more in the 90–85 win. The win marked the 10th straight win, the school's first 10-game winning streak since the 2019 season. MSU made only six of 23 three-pointers as they continued to struggle from three. The Spartans remained undefeated in Big Ten play at 6–0 and 15–2 on the season.

==== Illinois ====
MSU remained at home to face No. 16-ranked Illinois on January 19. The Spartans trailed early by as many as 10 points. However, they were able to narrow the lead and tie the game at 36 on a Jaxon Kohler put back at the half. In the second half, the game remained close, but the Spartans were able to take a lead by as many as seven with 3:53 remaining. A couple of missed baskets with less than 30 second left brought Illinois within one. However and Illinois turnover led to free throws for Tre Holloman to push the lead to three with five seconds remaining. Up three with those five seconds remaining, MSU chose to foul to avoid having Illinois make a game-tying three. The Illini made the first free throw and intentionally missed the second. They were able to secure a rebound, but the ensuing shot was shot over the backboard giving MSU the ball with 0.9 seconds left. The Spartans threw the ball down court to win the game 80–78. The Spartans only attempted 10 three-pointers while making three. MSU shot over 43% from the field as Holloman led the Spartans with 17 points. Frankie Fidler and Coen Carr each scored 11 as six Spartans scored eight or more in the win. The win was the Spartans 11th straight and left them the only undefeated team in conference play at 7–0 and 16–2 overall.

==== Rutgers ====
After five days off, the Spartans played Rutgers at Madison Square Garden on January 25. The Spartans had a slow start, falling behind in the first four minutes before taking the lead with 12:45 left in the first half. They would not trail from there, but only led by three at the half. In the second half, behind Jase Richardson's career-high 20 points, the Spartans pushed the lead to double digits and cruised to an easy 81–74 win. Coen Carr scored 14 points on five for five shooting and helped limit Scarlet Knights' star freshman Ace Bailey to four of 17 shooting in the game. Carr added eight rebounds while Jade Akins scored 12. The win marked the Spartans 12th straight win and moved MSU to 17–2 and 8–0 in sole possession of first place in conference. The win also marked Tom Izzo's 351st career Big Ten win, leaving him two behind Bob Knight's conference record of 353 wins.

==== Minnesota ====
The Spartans, moving up to No. 7 in the AP poll, returned home to face Minnesota on January 28. The Spartans, now ranked No. 7 in the country, dominated the Golden Gophers from the start, limiting them to 16 first half points and leading by as many as 22 in the first half. Tre Holloman made three consecutive threes late in the half to put the game out of reach. Leading by 20 at the half, the Spartans cruised to another easy win, beating Minnesota 73–51. Holloman led the Spartans with 12 points while Xavier Booker and Jaden Akins added 10. Jase Richardson notched eight assists while Carson Cooper grabbed 11 rebounds and added nine points. The win was Tom Izzo's 352nd career conference win, leaving him one behind Bob Knight. The Spartans moved to 18–2 and 9–0 on the season, their best start since 2019, with their 13th straight win. The win secured an undefeated December and January for the Spartans, the first time that had happened with Izzo as head coach.

==== USC ====
The Spartans took to the road for a two-game West Coast trip, playing Big Ten newcomer USC on February 1. MSU trailed throughout, narrowing the lead to a couple of points on several occasions, but never tied the game or took the lead. Jeremy Fears Jr. led the Spartans with 12 points while Jaden Akins added 11. All 10 Spartans who played scored at least two points and grabbed at least one rebound, but it was not enough as MSU lost its first conference game of the year 70–64. The loss dropped MSU to 18–3, 9–1 in Big Ten play. The Spartans remained in first place in the conference as the only team with just one loss.

==== UCLA ====
Staying in Los Angeles, MSU, now ranked ninth in both polls, played UCLA, also new to the Big Ten, on February 4. The Spartans took an early lead, ahead 15–8 with more than 14 minutes left in the half. From there, UCLA outscored MSU 27–13 to take a seven-point lead at the half. In the second half, the Bruins pushed the lead to as many as 11 before the Spartans rallied to tie the game with seven minutes remaining. The teams exchanged leads for the remainder of the half and the game was tied at 61 with less than a minute remaining. A missed shot by UCLA led to a missed shot by Jaxon Kohler. Kohler rebounded the ball, but traveled, giving the ball back to the Bruins. UCLA converted on the next possession, taking a two-point lead with seven seconds remaining. Jaden Akins, who led the Spartans with 15 points, missed a three-pointer as the clock expired as MSU lost their second straight game 63–61. No other Spartan scored in double figures, but all 10 Spartans who played scored points in the loss. The loss dropped MSU to 9–2 in Big Ten play and out of first place. The Spartans move to 18–3 on the season as Tom Izzo was thwarted in his second attempt to tie Bob Knight's record for wins.

==== Oregon ====
On February 8, MSU returned home looking to get back in the win column against another Big Ten newcomer, Oregon. The Spartans celebrated the 2000 championship team at the game. Starting point guard Jeremy Fears Jr. and forward Xavier Booker did not play in the game as both players were ill. The teams traded leads in the early going, but with just under seven minutes left in the first half, Oregon took control and took a 14-point lead at the half, 50–36. The Spartans rallied out of halftime, scoring on each of their first six possessions and closing the deficit to two. Oregon remained ahead until Izzo was called for a technical for arguing a foul call against the Spartans. The resulting free throws pushed the Ducks' lead to 62–53. Over the next minute, the Spartans erased the lead behind threes from Jaden Akins and Tre Holloman, and took the lead for good with Akins' layup to make it 66–64. The Spartans dominated on defense in the second half, holding Oregon to only 24 points while scoring 50 of their own to come away with a much-needed win, 86–74. Jase Richardson, playing in front of his father, Jason Richardson, controlled the game, scoring a career-high 29 points in his first career start. Jaxon Kohler added 14 points and 12 rebounds while Tre Holloman added 13 points and seven assists in the win. The win marked Izzo's 353rd Big Ten win, tying Bob Knight's record for most conference wins all-time. The win moved MSU to 19–4, 10–2 in conference play.

==== Indiana ====
Michigan State, now ranked No. 11 in the AP poll, played Indiana at Breslin Center on February 11 with a chance for Tom Izzo to break the record for most conference wins. MSU started well, taking an early lead and leading by as many as 12 in the first half. However, the Hoosiers countered MSU's good start by utilizing a zone that seemed to confuse the Spartans. Additionally, Indiana big men controlled the game, scoring 33 points and stopping any MSU run. The Spartans trailed by three at the half, and the Hoosiers led by as many as nine in the second half. The Spartans were able to narrow the lead to two with less than a minute left, but the Hoosiers hit the majority of their free throws and came away with a 71–67 win. After his career game against Oregon, Jase Richardson got the start again and scored 13 points, but made only one of six three-pointers in the loss. Jaden Akins led the Spartans with 14, but also struggled from three (making only two of nine attempts). Frankie Fidler added 12 points in the loss. The loss dropped the Spartans out of first place in Big Ten play at 10–3 and 19–5 overall.

==== Illinois ====
The Spartans visited Champaign to face Illinois on February 15. MSU fell behind early, trailing 6–0 and 17–6 five minutes into the game. With 8:46 left in the first half, the Illini pushed the lead to 16, 31–15, as MSU struggled to make shots. However, the Spartans finished the half on a 22–10 run to draw within four at the break. Less than a minute into the second half, Michigan State tied the game and even took the lead. The Illini answered as the team's exchanged the lead for the next 10 minutes. With 8:29 left in the half, Illinois took a 65–64 lead. Thereafter, MSU held Illinois scoreless for the remainder of the game as the Illini missed their final 19 shots of the game. Jaxon Kohler had a career-high 23 points including make four of five three-point attempts. The Spartans only attempted 12 three-pointers overall and made five, four by Kohler and the fifth by Xavier Booker. Kohler added 10 rebounds while Tre Holloman scored 14 as MSU pulled away for 79–65 road win. Jase Richardson added 11 points while Jeremy Fears Jr. had five assists. The win marked Tom Izzo's 354th, the most all-time in Big Ten conference play. The Spartans moved to 11–3 in conference play to remain in second place while winning their 20th game of the season.

==== Purdue ====
Michigan State, having slipped to No. 14 in the AP poll, returned home to face No. 13-ranked Purdue on February 18. The Boilermakers and Spartans remained close until Purdue took a seven-point lead with less than 10 minutes in the half. From there, MSU finished the half on a 19–7 run to take a 33–31 lead. MSU began the second half on an 8–0 run to push the lead to 11. Purdue kept the game close despite the Spartans leading by as many as 13 in the half and were able to narrow the lead to four on a few occasions. But, the Spartans, led by Jase Richardson's 12 points, won comfortably to give Purdue its third straight loss and marked MSU's first win against them since 2022. MSU shot over 58% from the floor in the win and made four of 13 three-pointers. Eight Spartans scored seven or more points in the win while Jeremy Fears Jr. and Tre Holloman added six assists each. The win moved MSU to sole possession of second place at 12–3 in the conference and 21–5 overall.

==== Michigan ====
The Spartans traveled to face rival and first-place Michigan (ranked No. 12 in the country) on February 21. MSU took an early lead, leading by eight less than eight minutes into the game. From there, the Wolverines outscored MSU 30–18 and took a four-point halftime lead. In the second half, the teams exchanged the lead for the first eight minutes, before Tre Holloman hit three three-pointers on consecutive possessions to put the Spartans ahead 57–49 with 10:49 remaining. Michigan narrowed the lead to three on a couple of occasions, but MSU held the Wolverines scoreless for the final 4:03, pulling out a 75–62 win. Jase Richardson led the Spartans with 21 points in a team-high 33 minutes. Tre Holloman added 18 points while Jaden Akins added 11 and Jeremy Fears Jr. notched 10 points. Richardson added six rebounds and three steals in the win. The win moved MSU a half game ahead of Michigan for sole possession of first place in the Big Ten at 13–3 and 22–5 overall.

==== Maryland ====
MSU, now ranked No. 8 in both polls, traveled to face No. 16 Maryland on February 26. Both teams struggled offensively as the defenses controlled, leading to a 23–21 halftime lead for Maryland. MSU, as it had done lately, took the lead in the second half and led for the majority of the half and held a nine-point lead with 5:24 left. From there, MSU scored only three points while Maryland scored 12, tying the game at 55 following a turnover by Tre Holloman. MSU took a timeout with 42 second left and Jaxon Kohler missed a layup with 12 seconds left. The Terrapins, without any timeouts, attempted a long three-pointer that fell short. Kohler rebounded the ball and fed Holloman who launched a shot from more than 60 feet away that went in with no time left to give the Spartans the 58–55 win. Tom Izzo said after the game that it was a lucky shot, but that the Spartans deserved to win the game. Jase Richardson continued his strong play, scoring 15 points and adding eight rebounds. The win moved MSU to 14–3 and remained half a game ahead of Michigan for first place in the conference with three games remaining. The Spartans also moved to 23–5 overall.

==== Wisconsin ====
MSU returned home to face No. 11 Wisconsin on March 2. Wisconsin jumped to an early 15–4 lead as MSU struggled with foul trouble as Jase Richardson committed his second foul with 14:39 remaining in the half. From there, the Spartans went on a 28–19 run to trail by only two at the half. Jaden Akins made four three-pointers, three in the first half to narrow the Badgers lead. As had been the case over the last five games, the Spartans controlled the second half, outscoring Wisconsin 39–28. MSU held on for the 71–62 win which, combined with Michigan's loss later in the day, put Michigan State alone in first place at 15–3. Akins finished with 19 points while Jaxon Kohler scored 10 and grabbed a career-high 16 rebounds. Jase Richardson added 11 points, five rebounds, and six assists in the win. The Spartans limited the Badgers to five of 32 from three while MSU made nine of 27. The win guaranteed MSU a double bye in the Big Ten tournament and gave them control of the regular season championship with only two games remaining. The win moved MSU to 24–5 on the season and was their fifth straight, with the last four being over ranked teams.

==== Iowa ====
The Spartans, who earned at least a share of the Big ten regular season championship with a loss by Michigan the day before, traveled to face Iowa on March 6. After taking an early 11–5 lead, Iowa outscored the Spartans 32–19 to finish the first half with a seven-point lead. MSU played poorly in the half and only remained in the game on the strength of Jase Richardson's performance. Richardson finished the game with a game-high 22 points and four rebounds. Early in the second half, Iowa extended its lead to double digits on multiple occasions. With MSU trailing 58–50 with less than 12 minutes remaining, the Spartans, as they had done in the prior five games, took over. They outscored the Hawkeyes 41–26 to finish the game. MSU led by as many as 20 late and held on for the 91–84 win. MSU outscored Iowa 61–47 in the half and secured an outright Big Ten championship with the win. Jaden Akins and Jaxon Kohler added 15 points each while Jeremy Fears Jr. scored 14. The win moved the Spartans to 25–5 and 16–3 in conference play.

==== Michigan ====
On the final day of the regular season, March 9, the Spartans faced Michigan at Breslin Center on senior day. The Spartans left little doubt, controlling the first half and taking a 50–28 lead at halftime. Jaden Akins, in his final game at Breslin, made three three-pointers early to spark the Spartans to a lead that reached 25 in the second half. Tre Holloman led the Spartans with 20 points while Jase Richardson added 18. The 79–62 win gave MSU the conference championship by three games as they won their seventh straight game. MSU finished the regular season 26–5, 17–3 in conference play. The 17th win marked the most conference wins for the team in school history. Late in the game, as Spartan seniors were being subbed out of the game and kissing the logo on the court, two Michigan players, L.J. Cason and Phat Phat Brooks, stood on the logo. Holloman took exception to them standing where the Spartan seniors wanted to kiss the logo and shoved Cason. This led to players beginning to push each other and coaches from both staffs rushing to stop the fight. Technical fouls were assessed against Holloman and Cason, but the tradition of kissing the logo continued without further incident. After the game, during the MSU senior day event, Tom Izzo stated that "nobody challenges our tradition" and called Holloman forward to kiss the logo even though he was not a senior.

== Postseason ==
=== Big Ten tournament ===
As the No. 1 seed in the Big Ten tournament, the Spartans earned a double bye to the quarterfinals.

==== Oregon ====
The Spartans, now ranked No. 6 in the coaches poll and No. 7 in the AP poll, played Oregon on March 14 in the quarterfinals of the Big Ten tournament. MSU started well, taking an 8–0 lead, but the Ducks rallied to keep the game close in the first half. However, the Spartans closed the half on an 11–2 run to take a 10-point halftime lead. Oregon started on its own 11–2 run to start the second half and draw within one. But, from there, MSU controlled the game, pushing the lead to as many as 15 and holding on for a 74–64 win. MSU shot 46% from three, making seven three-pointers while limiting the Ducks to 4–19 from three. Jase Richardson led the Spartans with 17 points and Jaden Akins added 12. Jeremy Fears Jr. played well, scoring 11 and notching five assists in the win. The win was MSU's eighth straight, all over top-30 NET teams and moved to 27–5 on the season.

==== Wisconsin ====
The Spartans played Wisconsin on March 15 in the semifinals of the Big Ten tournament. The Spartans surged to an early lead, but Wisconsin narrowed the gap and took the lead with less than two minutes left in the first half. The game went to halftime with the Badgers leading by four. In the second half, the game remained tight with neither team taking a lead of more than a few possessions. Wisconsin guard John Tonje scored a game-high 32 points while Jase Richardson scored 21 for MSU. After Jeremy Fears Jr. made two free throws to narrow the Badger lead to one, Tonje made two free throws with 14 seconds left in the game to push the lead to three. Tre Holloman was blocked on a three-point attempt that would have tied the game, but Tonje missed two free throws that would have sealed the win for the Badgers. Fears attempted a half court shot to tie the game, but was stripped by Tonje as time expired. The 77–74 loss ended the Spartan eight-game winning streak and their participation in the Big Ten tournament, finishing 27–6 on the season.

=== NCAA tournament ===
The Spartans received an at-large bid to the NCAA tournament as a No. 2 seed in the South region. This marked MSU's highest seed in the NCAA tournament since 2019.

==== Bryant ====
The Spartans faced No. 15-seeded Bryant in Cleveland on March 22. MSU started slow, falling behind 5–0 early to the Bulldogs. The Spartans recovered and kept the game close for the first 16 minutes. However, trailing 24–21 with 5:09 left in the first half, the Spartans finished the half on a 9–4 run to take a five-point halftime lead. In the second half, the Spartans pulled away, pushing the lead to 25 and won easily 87–62. MSU made 10 three-pointers in the game and dominated the boards, outrebounding Bryant 54–29. Coen Carr led the Spartans with 18 points and nine rebounds. Jase Richardson added 15 points while Tre Holloman scored 14 in the win. The win moved MSU so the second round of the NCAA tournament and to 28–6 on the season.

==== New Mexico ====
In the second round, the Spartans faced No. 10 seeded New Mexico, coached by former Minnesota coach Richard Pitino. Once again, the Spartans started slow, trailing by as many at 10 in the first half. However, they were able to limit the Lobos to only one field goal in the final nine minutes of the first half and trailed 31–29 at halftime. In the second half, the game remained close and New Mexico tied the game at 51 with 7:39 left in the game. From there, the Spartans outscored the Lobos 20–12 to win 71–63. Jase Richardson struggled in the game and did not score a point until he was fouled on a desperation three point shot with the shot clock expiring with less than two minutes left in the game. He made all three free throws and added a traditional three-point play shortly thereafter. Jaden Akins led MSU with 16 points while Tre Holloman added 14. The win moved MSU to the Sweet Sixteen for the second time in three years and for the 16th time under Tom Izzo. MSU moved to 29–6 on the season.

==== Ole Miss ====
The Spartans next played Ole Miss, the No. 6 seed in the region, on March 28 in Atlanta in the Sweet Sixteen. As had become the trend, the Spartans fell behind by as many eight in the first half, but narrowed the Rebel lead to two at halftime. Ole Miss kept the lead in the second half, leading by as many as eight, but MSU rallied to tie with approximately six minutes left. Jace Richardson led the Spartans with 20 points as MSU took the lead with 1:27 left and held on for the 73–70 win. Coen Carr, who got his first-career start due to Ole Miss's lineup, scored 15 points while Jaden Akins scored 15. The win moved the Spartans to the Elite Eight for the first time since 2019.

==== Auburn ====
In the Elite Eight, the Spartans faced overall No. 1 seed Auburn for a trip to the Final Four. MSU kept the game close early, but after leading 8–6 with less than 16 minutes left in the half, The Tigers went on a 17–0 run to take control of the game. The Spartans rallied to draw within five with less than four minutes left in the half, but Auburn pushed the lead to nine at halftime. Auburn led by as many as 12 in the second half, but the Spartans narrowed the lead to single digits, but it was not enough as they lost 70–64. Jaxon Kohler led the Spartans with 17 points and 11 rebounds. Jaden Akins made some baskets late, but scored 15 points on 17 shots. Jase Richardson scored 11 points on 13 shots while Tre Holloman went 0–10 from the field and managed only two points. The loss ended the season with a 30–7 record.

== Roster ==
2024–25 Michigan State Spartans men's basketball team
Players
Coaches

Pos.	#	Name	Height	Weight	Year	Previous school	Hometown
G	3	Jaden Akins	6 ft 4 in (1.93 m)	195 lb (88 kg)	Sr	Sunrise Christian Academy	Farmington, MI
F	34	Xavier Booker	6 ft 11 in (2.11 m)	240 lb (109 kg)	So	Cathedral High School	Indianapolis, IN
F	55	Coen Carr	6 ft 5 in (1.96 m)	225 lb (102 kg)	So	Legacy Early College	Greenville, SC
C	15	Carson Cooper	6 ft 11 in (2.11 m)	245 lb (111 kg)	Jr	IMG Academy	Jackson, MI
G	1	Jeremy Fears Jr. (C)	6 ft 2 in (1.88 m)	190 lb (86 kg)	RS Fr	Joliet West High School	Joliet, IL
F	8	Frankie Fidler	6 ft 7 in (2.01 m)	217 lb (98 kg)	Sr	Omaha; Bellevue West High School	Bellevue, NE
G	5	Tre Holloman (C)	6 ft 2 in (1.88 m)	185 lb (84 kg)	Jr	Cretin-Derham Hall High School	St. Paul, MN
F	0	Jaxon Kohler	6 ft 9 in (2.06 m)	245 lb (111 kg)	Jr	Southern California Academy	American Fork, UT
F	7	Gehrig Normand	6 ft 5 in (1.96 m)	190 lb (86 kg)	RS Fr	Birdville High School	North Richland Hills, TX
F	35	Jesse McCulloch (redshirt)	6 ft 10 in (2.08 m)	240 lb (109 kg)	Fr	Lutheran High School East	Cleveland, OH
G	11	Jase Richardson	6 ft 3 in (1.91 m)	185 lb (84 kg)	Fr	Christopher Columbus High School	Las Vegas, NV
G	20	Nick Sanders (W)	5 ft 10 in (1.78 m)	185 lb (84 kg)	Jr	Detroit Country Day School	Franklin, MI
F	2	Kur Teng	6 ft 4 in (1.93 m)	190 lb (86 kg)	Fr	Bradford Christian Academy	Manchester, NH
F	40	Brennan Walton (W)	6 ft 7 in (2.01 m)	220 lb (100 kg)	Fr	Okemos High School	Okemos, MI
F	43	Colin Walton (W)	6 ft 7 in (2.01 m)	220 lb (100 kg)	Fr	Okemos High School	Okemos, MI
C	10	Szymon Zapala	7 ft 0 in (2.13 m)	245 lb (111 kg)	Sr	Longwood; Utah State; SMS PZkosz Wladyslawowo	Zaborze, Poland

Head coach

- Tom Izzo (Northern Michigan)

Assistant coach(es)

- Doug Wojcik (Navy)
- Thomas Kelley (Michigan State)
- Saddi Washington (Western Michigan)
- Jon Borovich (Central Michigan)
- Austin Thornton (Michigan State)

Legend

- (C) Team captain
- (S) Suspended
- (I) Ineligible
- (W) Walk-on
- Injured
- Current redshirt

Roster

== Schedule and results ==
On May 1, 2024, Tom Izzo announced that the Spartans would take a 10-day trip to Spain as the team had previously done in 2015. The Spartans once again participated in the Champions Classic. They also participated in the Maui Invitational for the fifth time and the first time since 2019. On May 2, the Big Ten announced the conference opponents for the 2024–25 season as the conference expanded to 18 teams. Each school will play seven teams at home, seven on the road, and three teams both on the road and at home. The Spartans will face Indiana, Nebraska, Oregon, Penn State, Purdue, Washington, and Wisconsin at home while facing Iowa, Maryland, Northwestern, Ohio State, Rutgers, UCLA, and USC on the road. MSU will play Illinois, Michigan, and Minnesota home and away. On August 8, the school announced the team would play an exhibition game against Tom Izzo's alma mater, Northern Michigan, at the school's football stadium, the Superior Dome on October 13. On September 10, the school announced the full non-conference schedule. The school announced the full schedule on September 19.

Date time, TV	Rank^{#}	Opponent^{#}	Result	Record	High points	High rebounds	High assists	Site (attendance) city, state
Spanish exhibition trip
August 15, 2024*; 1:00 pm		Madrid All-Stars	W 94–87		21 – Booker	12 – Kohler	6 – Fears Jr.	Madrid, Spain
August 18, 2024*; 1:00 pm		Valencia All-Stars	W 105–59		20 – Carr	8 – Zapala	7 – Holloman	L'Alqueria del Basket; Valencia, Spain
August 20, 2024*; 12:00 pm		KK FMP	L 110–115		18 – Fidler	–	–	Olimpic Arena; Spain
Exhibition
October 13, 2024*; 1:00 p.m., BTN		at Northern Michigan	W 70–53		11 – Richardson	9 – Zapala	4 – Richardson	Superior Dome (11,500); Marquette, MI
October 29, 2024*; 7:00 p.m., B1G+		Ferris State	W 85–67		14 – Fidler	11 – Kohler	9 – Holloman	Breslin Center (14,797); East Lansing, MI
Regular season
November 4, 2024*; 7:00 p.m., B1G+		Monmouth	W 81–57	1–0	23 – Akins	9 – Akins	8 – Fears Jr.	Breslin Center (14,797); East Lansing, MI
November 7, 2024*; 8:00 p.m., BTN		Niagara	W 96–60	2–0	20 – Kohler	13 – Kohler	8 – Fears Jr.	Breslin Center (14,797); East Lansing, MI
November 12, 2024*; 6:30 p.m., ESPN		vs. No. 1 Kansas; Champions Classic	L 69–77	2–1	15 – Fidler	10 – Kohler	6 – Fears Jr.	State Farm Arena (16,107); Atlanta, GA
November 16, 2024*; 6:00 p.m., BTN		Bowling Green	W 86–72	3–1	13 – Akins	12 – Akins	6 – Akins	Breslin Center (14,797); East Lansing, MI
November 19, 2024*; 8:00 p.m., Peacock		Samford	W 83–75	4–1	25 – Akins	6 – Tied	9 – Holloman	Breslin Center (14,797); East Lansing, MI
November 25, 2024*; 5:00 p.m., ESPN2		vs. Colorado; Maui Invitational Quarterfinals	W 72–56	5–1	13 – Richardson	7 – Zapala	6 – Fears Jr.	Lahaina Civic Center (2,400); Lahaina, HI
November 26, 2024*; 6:00 p.m., ESPN		vs. Memphis; Maui Invitational Semifinals	L 63–71	5–2	18 – Richardson	8 – Kohler	3 – Tied	Lahaina Civic Center (2,400); Lahaina, HI
November 27, 2024*; 9:30 p.m., ESPN2		vs. No. 12 North Carolina; Maui Invitational 3rd place game	W 94–91 ^{OT}	6–2	19 – Holloman	7 – Tied	7 – Holloman	Lahaina Civic Center (2,400); Lahaina, HI
December 4, 2024; 8:30 p.m., BTN		at Minnesota	W 90–72	7–2 (1–0)	12 – Carr	11 – Kohler	8 – Holloman	Williams Arena (8,424); Minneapolis, MN
December 7, 2024; 12:00 p.m., BTN		Nebraska	W 89–52	8–2 (2–0)	18 – Akins	13 – Kohler	8 – Fears Jr.	Breslin Center (14,797); East Lansing, MI
December 17, 2024*; 7:00 p.m., ESPN2	No. 20	vs. Oakland	W 77–58	9–2	18 – Booker	10 – Kohler	4 – Fears Jr.	Little Caesars Arena (12,011); Detroit, MI
December 21, 2024*; 2:00 p.m., FS1	No. 20	Florida Atlantic	W 86–69	10–2	17 – Carr	12 – Kohler	8 – Fears Jr.	Breslin Center (14,797); East Lansing, MI
December 30, 2024*; 3:00 p.m., BTN	No. 18	Western Michigan	W 80–62	11–2	18 – Akins	9 – Zapala	6 – Holloman	Breslin Center (14,797); East Lansing, MI
January 3, 2025; 8:00 p.m., FOX	No. 18	at Ohio State	W 69–62	12–2 (3–0)	15 – Zapala	10 – Kohler	7 – Fears Jr.	Value City Arena (13,604); Columbus, OH
January 9, 2025; 8:00 p.m., BTN	No. 16	Washington	W 88–54	13–2 (4–0)	20 – Akins	7 – Tied	10 – Fears Jr.	Breslin Center (14,797); East Lansing, MI
January 12, 2025; 12:00 p.m., FOX	No. 16	at Northwestern	W 78–68	14–2 (5–0)	14 – Akins	5 – 4 Tied	8 – Fears Jr.	Welsh–Ryan Arena (7,039); Evanston, IL
January 15, 2025; 7:30 p.m., BTN	No. 12	Penn State	W 90–85	15–2 (6–0)	18 – Fidler	7 – Fidler	7 – Fears Jr.	Breslin Center (14,797); East Lansing, MI
January 19, 2025; 12:00 p.m., CBS	No. 12	No. 19 Illinois	W 80–78	16–2 (7–0)	17 – Holloman	8 – Cooper	6 – Fears Jr.	Breslin Center (14,797); East Lansing, MI
January 25, 2025; 1:30 p.m., CBS	No. 8	at Rutgers	W 81–74	17–2 (8–0)	20 – Richardson	8 – Carr	6 – Holloman	Madison Square Garden (17,480); New York, NY
January 28, 2025; 8:00 p.m., Peacock	No. 7	Minnesota	W 73–51	18–2 (9–0)	12 – Holloman	11 – Cooper	8 – Richardson	Breslin Center (14,797); East Lansing, MI
February 1, 2025; 4:30 p.m., Peacock	No. 7	at USC	L 64–70	18–3 (9–1)	12 – Fears Jr.	7 – Kohler	6 – Fears Jr.	Galen Center (8,251); Los Angeles, CA
February 4, 2025; 10:00 p.m., Peacock	No. 9	at UCLA	L 61–63	18–4 (9–2)	15 – Akins	9 – Cooper	5 – Fears Jr.	Pauley Pavilion (10,074); Los Angeles, CA
February 8, 2025; 12:00 p.m., FOX	No. 9	Oregon	W 86–74	19–4 (10–2)	29 – Richardson	12 – Kohler	7 – Holloman	Breslin Center (14,797); East Lansing, MI
February 11, 2025; 9:00 p.m., Peacock	No. 11	Indiana	L 67–71	19–5 (10–3)	14 – Akins	7 – Kohler	7 – Holloman	Breslin Center (14,797); East Lansing, MI
February 15, 2025; 8:00 p.m., FOX	No. 11	at Illinois	W 79–65	20–5 (11–3)	23 – Kohler	10 – Kohler	5 – Fears Jr.	State Farm Center (15,544); Champaign, IL
February 18, 2025; 7:00 p.m., Peacock	No. 14	No. 13 Purdue	W 75–66	21–5 (12–3)	12 – Richardson	4 – 3 Tied	6 – Tied	Breslin Center (14,797); East Lansing, MI
February 21, 2025; 8:00 p.m., FOX	No. 14	at No. 12 Michigan; Rivalry	W 75–62	22–5 (13–3)	21 – Richardson	8 – Cooper	4 – Holloman	Crisler Center (12,707); Ann Arbor, MI
February 26, 2025; 6:30 p.m., BTN	No. 8	at No. 16 Maryland	W 58–55	23–5 (14–3)	15 – Richardson	8 – Tied	3 – Holloman	Xfinity Center (17,950); College Park, MD
March 2, 2025; 1:30 p.m., CBS	No. 8	No. 11 Wisconsin	W 71–62	24–5 (15–3)	19 – Akins	16 – Kohler	6 – Richardson	Breslin Center (14,797); East Lansing, MI
March 6, 2025; 8:00 p.m., FS1	No. 8	at Iowa	W 91–84	25–5 (16–3)	22 – Richardson	6 – Kohler	4 – Tied	Carver–Hawkeye Arena (10,347); Iowa City, IA
March 9, 2025; 12:00 p.m., CBS	No. 8	No. 17 Michigan; Rivalry	W 79–62	26–5 (17–3)	20 – Holloman	8 – Cooper	6 – Fears Jr	Breslin Center (14,797); East Lansing, MI
Big Ten tournament
March 14, 2025; 12:00 p.m., BTN	(1) No. 7	vs. (8) No. 23 Oregon; Quarterfinal	W 74–64	27–5	17 – Richardson	8 – Carr	5 – Fears Jr.	Gainbridge Fieldhouse; Indianapolis, IN
March 15, 2025; 1:00 p.m., CBS	(1) No. 7	vs. (5) No. 18 Wisconsin; Semifinal	L 74–77	27–6	21 – Richardson	10 – Cooper	6 – Fears Jr.	Gainbridge Fieldhouse; Indianapolis, IN
NCAA tournament
March 21, 2025*; 10:00 p.m., TBS	(2 S) No. 8	vs. (15 S) Bryant; First Round	W 87–62	28–6	18 – Carr	9 – 3 Tied	6 – Fears Jr.	Rocket Arena (17,392); Cleveland, OH
March 23, 2025*; 8:40 p.m., TNT	(2 S) No. 8	vs. (10 S) New Mexico; Second Round	W 71–63	29–6	16 – Akins	8 – Cooper	4 – Tied	Rocket Arena (15,791); Cleveland, OH
March 28, 2025*; 7:09 p.m., CBS	(2 S) No. 8	vs. (6 S) Ole Miss; Sweet Sixteen	W 73–70	30–6	20 – Richardson	7 – Cooper	6 – Fears Jr.	State Farm Arena (16,743); Atlanta, GA
March 30, 2025*; 5:05 p.m., CBS	(2 S) No. 8	vs. (1 S) No. 4 Auburn; Elite Eight	L 64–70	30–7	17 – Kohler	12 – Kohler	5 – Fears Jr.	State Farm Arena (16,768); Atlanta, GA
*Non-conference game. ^{#}Rankings from AP Poll. (#) Tournament seedings in parentheses. S=South. All times are in Eastern Time.

== Player statistics ==
Individual player statistics (final)
			Minutes		Scoring		Total FGs			3-point FGs			Free-Throws			Rebounds							
Player	GP	GS	Tot	Avg	Pts	Avg	FG	FGA	Pct	3FG	3FA	Pct	FT	FTA	Pct	Off	Def	Tot	Avg	A	Stl	Blk	TO
Akins, Jaden	37	37	1008	27.2	474	12.8	176	442	.398	58	198	.293	64	84	.762	24	107	131	3.5	56	29	10	40
Booker, Xavier	33	3	424	12.8	155	4.7	58	139	.417	17	73	.233	22	28	.786	22	51	73	2.2	8	2	22	29
Carr, Coen	37	1	766	20.7	299	8.1	113	185	.611	5	15	.333	68	97	.701	56	79	135	3.6	20	19	27	32
Cooper, Carson	37	0	635	17.2	186	5.0	64	107	.598	0	1	.000	58	78	.744	55	138	193	5.2	22	7	24	28
Fears Jr., Jeremy	36	36	852	23.7	258	7.2	71	179	.397	13	38	.342	103	141	.730	11	66	77	2.1	196	38	8	72
Fidler, Frankie	37	7	598	16.2	260	7.0	80	205	.390	13	66	.197	87	101	861	31	92	123	3.3	28	18	8	23
Holloman, Tre	37	16	853	23.1	337	9.1	113	303	.373	48	146	.329	63	74	.851	7	64	71	1.9	137	30	9	58
Kohler, Jaxon	37	34	770	20.8	289	7.8	112	216	.519	19	51	.373	46	56	.821	93	183	276	7.5	49	13	29	47
Normand, Gehrig	13	0	26	2.0	8	0.6	3	8	.375	2	6	.333	0	0		1	0	1	0.1	3	0	0	1
Richardson, Jase	36	15	912	25.3	437	12.1	144	292	.493	47	114	.412	102	122	.836	23	96	119	3.3	68	30	11	30
Sanders, Nick	10	0	12	1.2	8	0.8	4	7	.571	0	2	.000	0	0		1	1	2	0.2	0	0	0	1
Teng, Kur	19	0	59	3.1	10	0.5	3	14	.214	2	9	.222	2	2	1.000	4	10	14	0.7	3	1	0	4
Zapala, Szymon	36	36	508	14.1	153	4..3	62	95	.653	0	2	.000	29	44	.659	58	85	143	4.0	23	9	21	31
Total	37		7425		2874	77.7	1003	2192	.458	224	72	.311	644	827	.779	440	1032	1472	39.8	613	196	169	420
Opponents	37		7425		2484	67.1	879	2163	.405	246	880	.280	486	681	.714	339	805	1144	30.9	461	220	117	408

Legend
GP	Games played	GS	Games started	Avg	Average per game
FG	Field-goals made	FGA	Field-goal attempts	Off	Offensive rebounds
Def	Defensive rebounds	A	Assists	TO	Turnovers
Blk	Blocks	Stl	7

== Rankings ==
Ranking movements Legend: ██ Increase in ranking ██ Decrease in ranking RV = Received votes т = Tied with team above or below
	Week																				
Poll	Pre	1	2	3	4	5	6	7	8	9	10	11	12	13	14	15	16	17	18	19	Final
AP	RV	RV	RV	RV	RV	21	20	18	18	16	12	8	7	9	11	14	8	8	7	8	7
Coaches	RV	RV	RV	RV	25	19	19	18	15	14	12	8	7	9	11	13	8	7	6т	7	7

== Awards and honors ==
=== In-season awards ===
Name	Award	Date
Jase Richardson	Big Ten Freshman of the Week	February 24, 2025
Jase Richardson	Big Ten Freshman of the Week	March 3, 2025
Jase Richardson	Big Ten Freshman of the Week	March 10, 2025

=== Postseason awards ===
==== Jaden Akins ====
- All-Big Ten third team (coaches)
- All-Big Ten defensive team
- Academic All-American Second Team

==== Jase Richardson ====
- All-Big Ten third team (coaches and media)
- All-Big Ten freshman team
