= 2013 Maui Invitational =

Basketball tournament

2013 Maui Invitational Tournament
- Season: 2013–14
- Teams: 8
- Finals site: Lahaina Civic Center, Maui, Hawaii
- Champions: Syracuse (3rd title)
- Runner-up: Baylor (1st title game)
- Semifinalists: Dayton (2nd semifinal); California (1st semifinal)
- Winning coach: Jim Boeheim (3rd title)
- MVP: C. J. Fair (Syracuse)

The 2013 Maui Invitational Tournament was an early-season college basketball tournament played from November 15 to November 27, 2013. It was the 30th annual holding of the Maui Invitational Tournament, which began in 1984, and was part of the 2013–14 NCAA Division I men's basketball season. The Championship Round was played at the Lahaina Civic Center in Maui, Hawaii from November 25 to 27.

== Bracket ==
=== Opening Round ===
The Opening Round was played on November 15–19 at various sites around the country.

==== November 15 ====
- Arkansas 76, Louisiana–Lafayette 63 in Fayetteville, AR
- California 64, Oakland 60 in Berkeley, CA

==== November 16 ====
- Dayton 78, St. Francis Brooklyn 58 in Dayton, OH

==== November 17 ====
- Baylor 87, Louisiana–Lafayette 68 in Waco, TX
- Gonzaga 82, Oakland 67 in Spokane, WA

==== November 18 ====
- Syracuse 56, St. Francis Brooklyn 50 in Syracuse, NY

==== November 19 ====
- Minnesota 82, Coastal Carolina 72 in Minneapolis, MN

=== Regional Round ===
Semifinals; November 23
St. Francis Brooklyn	59
Coastal Carolina	70
Oakland	75
Louisiana–Lafayette	84

Final; November 24
Coastal Carolina	69
Louisiana–Lafayette	73
3rd-place game
St. Francis Brooklyn	68
Oakland	62

* Games played at HTC Center in Conway, South Carolina

=== Championship Round ===
The Championship Round occurred from November 25–27 at Lahaina Civic Center in Maui, Hawaii.

Fifth Place Game; November 27
Arkansas	81
11	Gonzaga	91
Seventh Place Game
Minnesota	83
Chaminade	68

Consolation 2nd Round; November 26
Arkansas	87
13	Minnesota	73
Chaminade	81
11	Gonzaga	113

Quarterfinals; November 25
Arkansas	77
California	85
Minnesota	67
8	Syracuse	75
Chaminade	77
18	Baylor	93
Dayton	84
11	Gonzaga	79

Semifinals; November 26
California	81
8	Syracuse	92
18	Baylor	67
Dayton	66

Championship; November 27
8	Syracuse	74
18	Baylor	67
Third-place game
California	64
Dayton	82
