= Stan Sheriff Center =

Multi-purpose arena in Hawaii, United States

Bankoh Arena at the Stan Sheriff Center
- The Stanley; The Aloha Dome; The Rainbow Dome
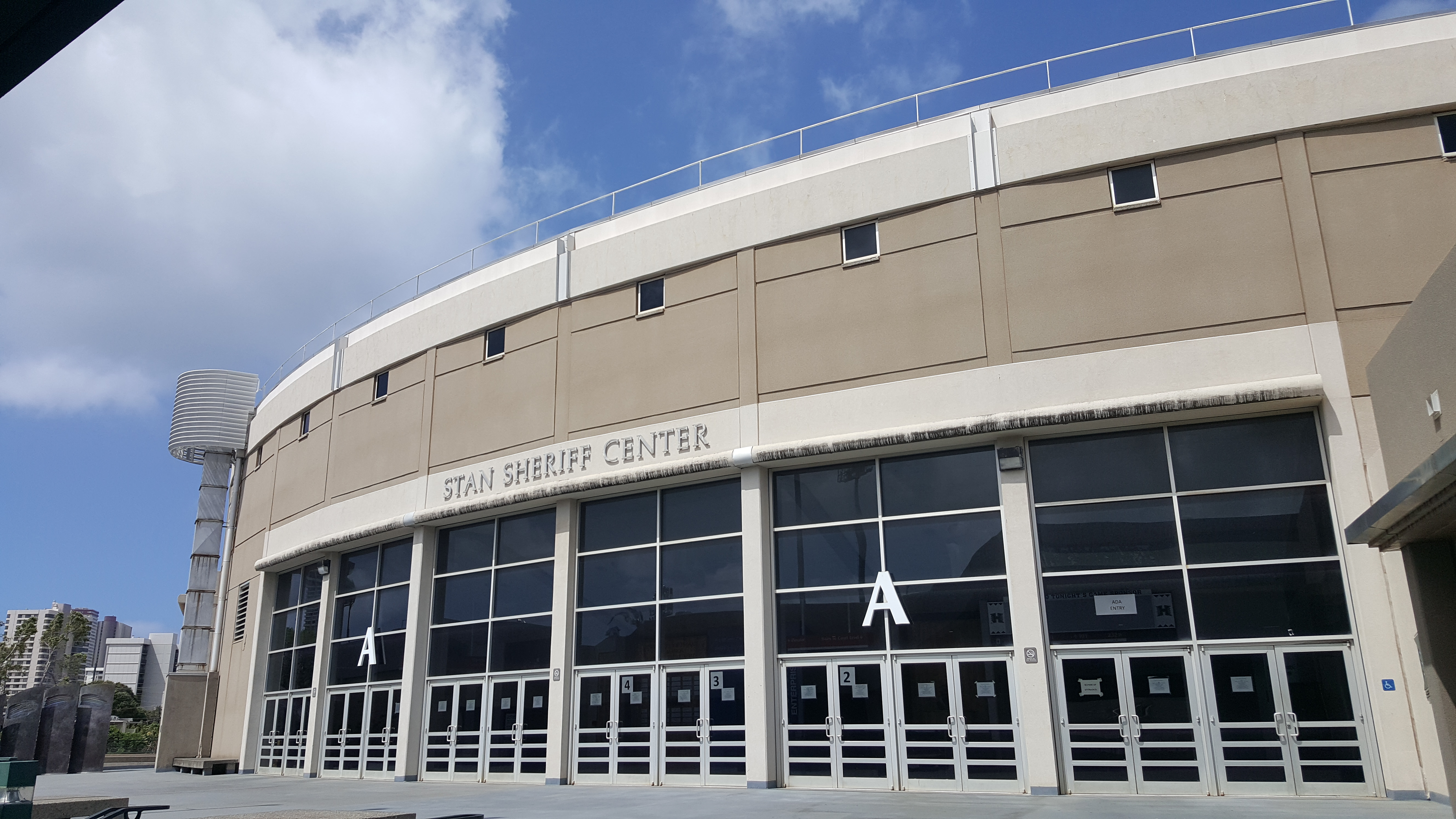
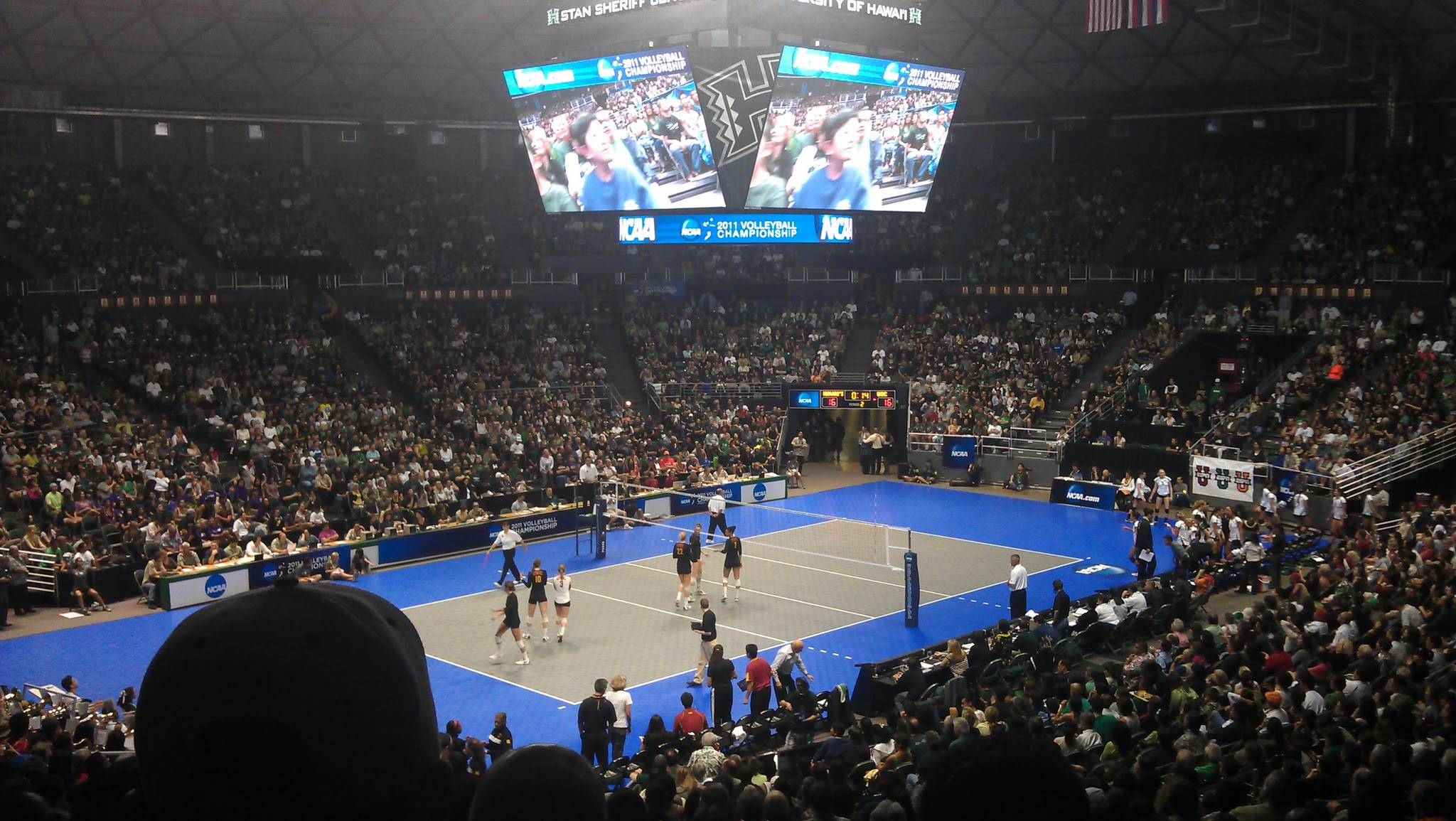
- Interactive map of Bankoh Arena at the Stan Sheriff Center
- Former names: Special Events Arena (1994–1998)
- Location: 1355 Lower Campus Drive; Honolulu, Hawaii, 96822-2312
- Coordinates: 21°17′39″N 157°49′08″W
- Owner: University of Hawaii at Manoa
- Operator: University of Hawaii at Manoa
- Capacity: 10,300
- Surface: Hardwood

Construction
- Groundbreaking: December 1992
- Opened: October 21, 1994
- Cost: $32.24 million ($70 million in 2025 dollars)
- Architects: Kauahikaua and Chun (Honolulu); Heery Architects (Atlanta)
- General contractors: Charles Pankow Builders, Ltd.

Tenants
- Hawaii Rainbow Warriors and Rainbow Wahine (basketball, volleyball); Diamond Head Classic

The Bankoh Arena at the Stan Sheriff Center is a 10,300-seat multi-purpose arena in Honolulu CDP, City and County of Honolulu, Hawaii, on the campus of the University of Hawaii at Manoa (UH). Initially named the Special Events Arena when it opened in 1994, the arena was renamed the Stan Sheriff Center in 1998 in honor of Stan Sheriff (1932–1993), a former UH athletic director who lobbied for its construction. Bank of Hawaii secured naming rights on a 10-year, $5-million contract announced on November 12, 2020, which initially renamed the arena "SimpliFi Arena at Stan Sheriff Center" after their digital banking product. The arena branding was changed to "Bankoh", a common local nickname for Bank of Hawaii, on August 26, 2025 to reflect the bank's community and university ties.

== Events ==
The arena is home to the University of Hawaiʻi men's Rainbow Warriors basketball and Rainbow Warriors volleyball, and the women's Rainbow Wahine basketball, and Rainbow Wahine volleyball teams.

The Diamond Head Classic midseason college basketball tournament was held at the arena annually since December 2009 until it was paused in 2025, and the annual regional FIRST Robotics Competition was held there from 2008-2024.

On May 12, 1998, the Miss Universe pageant was held at the Center. As Hawaii's largest indoor arena, the Stan Sheriff Center is the site of many major concert tours in Honolulu. Concert capacity is 11,000 for an end-stage show and 11,300 for a center-stage show.

World Championship Wrestling used the Stan Sheriff Center as its Hawaiian stop from 1994 until the organization folded in 2001.

The arena hosted two NBA preseason games between the Los Angeles Lakers and Utah Jazz on October 4 and 6, 2015. Both were designated as Lakers home games; the Jazz swept the short series, winning the second game in overtime.

The arena again hosted two NBA preseason games between the Los Angeles Clippers and Toronto Raptors on October 1 and 3, 2017. Toronto ended up winning the first game, while the Clippers won the second game. The Clippers returned in 2018 for a preseason game against the Sydney Kings. The Clippers once more hosted two more preseason games in 2019 one against the Houston Rockets on October 3, 2019, which Houston won and another against the Shanghai Sharks on October 6, 2019, which the Clippers won.

The 2023 Maui Invitational was hosted at the arena due to damage from wildfires on Maui, the event's usual location.

== See also ==
- List of NCAA Division I basketball arenas

Preceded by Miami Beach Convention Center (United States) Miami Beach	Miss Universe Venue; 1998	Succeeded by Chaguaramas Convention Centre (Trinidad and Tobago) Chaguaramas
