= 1996 Maui Invitational =

1996 Maui Invitational Tournament
- Season: 1996–97
- Teams: 8
- Finals site: Lahaina Civic Center; Maui, Hawaii
- Champions: Kansas (1st title)
- Runner-up: Virginia (1st title game)
- Semifinalists: California; UMass
- Winning coach: Roy Williams (1st title)
- MVP: Raef LaFrentz (Kansas)

The 1996 Maui Invitational Tournament was an early-season college basketball tournament that was played, for the 13th time, from November 25 to November 27, 1996. The tournament, which began in 1984, was part of the 1996-97 NCAA Division I men's basketball season. The tournament was played at the Lahaina Civic Center in Maui, Hawaii and was won by the Kansas Jayhawks. It was the first title for both the program and for its head coach Roy Williams.

== Bracket ==
5th place game November 22
South Carolina	74
LSU	68
7th place game
Chaminade	37
Iowa	67

Consolation 2nd Round; November 26
Chaminade	55
South Carolina	64
Iowa	60
LSU	70

First Round; November 25
Chaminade	48
15	UMass	59
South Carolina	70
Virginia	93
California	75
Iowa	59
2	Kansas	82
LSU	53

Semifinals; November 26
15	UMass	68
Virginia	75
California	67
2	Kansas	85

Championship; November 27
Virginia	63
2	Kansas	80
3rd place game
15	UMass	55
California	59
