= 2006 Maui Invitational =

The 2006 Maui Invitational Tournament, an annual early-season college basketball tournament held in Lahaina, Hawaii, was held November 20–22 at Lahaina Civic Center. The winning team was UCLA.

== Bracket ==
Fifth Place Game; November 22
Purdue	81
DePaul	73
Seventh Place Game
Oklahoma	72
Chaminade	57

Consolation 2nd Round; November 21
Oklahoma	71
Purdue	74
DePaul	93
Chaminade	74

First round November 20
5	UCLA	82
Chaminade	69
20	Kentucky	87
DePaul	81
11	Memphis	77
Oklahoma	65
Purdue	61
19	Georgia Tech	79

Semifinals; November 21
5	UCLA	73
20	Kentucky	68
11	Memphis	85
19	Georgia Tech	92

Championship; November 22
5	UCLA	88
19	Georgia Tech	73
Third-place game
20	Kentucky	63
11	Memphis	80
