= 2012 Maui Invitational =

- Season: 2012–13
- Teams: 8
- Finals site: Lahaina Civic Center, Maui, Hawaii
- Champions: Illinois (1st title)
- Runner-up: Butler (1st title game)
- Semifinalists: North Carolina (6th semifinal); Chaminade (6th semifinal)
- Winning coach: John Groce (1st title)
- MVP: Brandon Paul (Illinois)

The 2012 Maui Invitational Tournament was an early-season college basketball tournament played from November 9 to November 21, 2012. It was the 29th annual holding of the Maui Invitational Tournament, which began in 1984, and part of the 2012–13 NCAA Division I men's basketball season. The Championship Round was played at the Lahaina Civic Center in Maui, Hawaii from November 19 to 21.

== Brackets ==
* – Denotes overtime period

=== Opening Round ===
The Opening Round was played on November 9–13 at various sites around the country.

==== November 9 ====
- Illinois 75 – Colgate 55 in Champaign, IL
- USC 87 – Coppin State 73 in Los Angeles, CA

==== November 10 ====
- Butler 74 – Elon 59 in Indianapolis, IN

==== November 11 ====
- Marquette 84 – Colgate 63 in Milwaukee, WI
- North Carolina 80 – Florida Atlantic 56 in Chapel Hill, NC

==== November 12 ====
- Texas 69 – Coppin State 46 in Austin, TX

==== November 13 ====
- Mississippi State 78 – Florida Atlantic 58 in Starkville, MS

=== Regional Round ===
Semifinals; November 17
Colgate	72
Elon	81
Coppin State	61
Florida Atlantic	64

Final; November 18
Elon	62
Florida Atlantic	59*
3rd-place game November 18
Colgate	88
Coppin State	84

*Games played at Alumni Gym in Elon, NC

=== Championship Round ===
The Championship Round occurred from November 19–21 at Lahaina Civic Center in Maui, Hawaii.

Fifth Place Game; November 21
13	Marquette	72
USC	64
Seventh Place Game
Mississippi State	55
Texas	69

Consolation 2nd Round; November 20
Marquette	89
Mississippi State	62
Texas	53
USC	59*

Quarterfinals; November 19
Butler	72
Marquette	71
Mississippi State	49
9	North Carolina	95
Texas	73
Chaminade	86
USC	64
Illinois	94

Semifinals; November 20
Butler	82
9	North Carolina	71
Illinois	84
Chaminade	61

Championship; November 21
Butler	61
Illinois	78
Third-place game
9	North Carolina	112
Chaminade	70
