= 2007 Maui Invitational =

The 2007 Maui Invitational Tournament, an annual early-season college basketball tournament held in Lahaina, Hawaii, was held November 19–21 at Lahaina Civic Center. The winning team was Duke Blue Devils.

== Bracket ==
* – Denotes overtime period

Fifth Place Game; November 21
LSU	84
Arizona State	87*
Seventh Place Game
Princeton	70
Chaminade	74

Consolation 2nd Round; November 20
LSU	78
Chaminade	72
Princeton	42
Arizona State	61

First round November 19
11	Marquette	74
Chaminade	63
LSU	77
Oklahoma State	83
Princeton	61
10	Duke	83
Arizona State	54
Illinois	77

Semifinals; November 20
11	Marquette	91
Oklahoma State	61
10	Duke	79
Illinois	66

Championship; November 21
11	Marquette	73
10	Duke	77
Third-place game
Oklahoma State	49
Illinois	65
