= 2004 Maui Invitational =

College basketball tournament in Hawaii

2004 Maui Invitational Tournament
- Season: 2004–05
- Teams: 8
- Finals site: Lahaina Civic Center, Maui, Hawaii
- Champions: North Carolina (2nd title)
- Runner-up: Iowa (2nd title game)
- Semifinalists: Texas; Tennessee
- Winning coach: Roy Williams (2nd title)
- MVP: Raymond Felton (North Carolina)

The 2004 Maui Invitational Tournament was an early-season college basketball tournament that was played, for the 21st time, from November 22 to November 24, 2004. The tournament began in 1984, and was part of the 2004–05 NCAA Division I men's basketball season. The tournament was played at the Lahaina Civic Center in Maui, Hawaii and was won by the North Carolina Tar Heels. It was UNC's second Maui title and the second for head coach Roy Williams, who led the Kansas Jayhawks to the 1996 title.

== Bracket ==
Fifth Place Game; November 24
14	Louisville	82
Stanford	67
Seventh Place Game
Chaminade	56
BYU	77

Consolation 2nd Round; November 23
14	Louisville	93
Chaminade	63
Stanford	62
BYU	53

First round November 22
14	Louisville	71
Iowa	76
Chaminade	62
15	Texas	84
11	Tennessee	69
Stanford	57
4	North Carolina	86
BYU	50

Semifinals; November 23
Iowa	82
15	Texas	80
11	Tennessee	81
4	North Carolina	94

Championship; November 24
Iowa	92
4	North Carolina	106
Third-place game
15	Texas	90
Tennessee	75
