= 2009 Maui Invitational =

- Season: 2009–10
- Teams: 8
- Finals site: Lahaina Civic Center; Maui, Hawaii
- Champions: Gonzaga (1st title)
- Runner-up: Cincinnati (1st title game)
- Semifinalists: Wisconsin (1st semifinal); Maryland (3rd semifinal)
- Winning coach: Mark Few (1st title)
- MVP: Steven Gray & Matt Bouldin (Gonzaga)

The 2009 Maui Invitational Tournament, an annual early-season college basketball tournament held in Lahaina, Hawaii, was held at Lahaina Civic Center. The winning team was Gonzaga.

== Bracket ==
* – Denotes overtime period

Fifth Place Game; November 25
24	Vanderbilt	84
Arizona	72
Seventh Place Game
Colorado	73
Chaminade	58

Consolation 2nd Round; November 24
24	Vanderbilt	68
Chaminade	41
Colorado	87
Arizona	91*

First round November 23
22	Maryland	79
Chaminade	51
Cincinnati	67
24	Vanderbilt	58
Colorado	72
Gonzaga	76
Arizona	61
Wisconsin	65

Semifinals; November 24
22	Maryland	57
Cincinnati	69
Gonzaga	74
Wisconsin	61

Championship; November 25
Cincinnati	59
Gonzaga	61*
Third-place game
22	Maryland	69
Wisconsin	78
