= 2019 Maui Invitational =

American men's regular season college basketball tournament

2019 Maui Invitational Tournament
- Season: 2019–20
- Teams: 8
- Finals site: Lahaina Civic Center, Maui, Hawaii
- Champions: Kansas (3rd title)
- Runner-up: Dayton (2nd title game)
- Semifinalists: Virginia Tech (2nd semifinal); BYU (2nd semifinal)
- Winning coach: Bill Self (2nd title)
- MVP: Udoka Azubuike & Devon Dotson (Kansas)

The 2019 Maui Invitational Tournament was an early-season college basketball tournament played for the 36th time. The tournament began in 1984, and was part of the 2019–20 NCAA Division I men's basketball season. The Championship Round was played at the Lahaina Civic Center in Maui, Hawaii from November 25 to 27, 2019.

Due to COVID-19 concerns in 2020 and 2021, the tournament did not return to Maui until 2022.

== Bracket ==
5th Place Game; Wednesday, November 27
3	Michigan State	75
UCLA	62
7th Place Game
Georgia	80
Chaminade	77

Consolation 2nd Round; Tuesday, November 26
Georgia	85
3	Michigan State	93
Chaminade	48
UCLA	74

First Round; Monday, November 25
Georgia	61
Dayton	80
Virginia Tech	71
3	Michigan State	66
4	Kansas	93
Chaminade	63
BYU	78
UCLA	63

Semifinals; Tuesday, November 26
Dayton	89
Virginia Tech	62
4	Kansas	71
BYU	56

Championship; Wednesday, November 27
Dayton	84
4	Kansas	90
3rd Place Game
Virginia Tech	77
BYU	90

== Game summaries ==
=== Quarterfinals ===
ESPN2

November 25, 2019
9:30 a.m. HST

Report

Georgia Bulldogs 61, Dayton Flyers 80
Scoring by half: 25–43, 36–37
Pts: T. Fagan, 11; Rebs: R. Hammonds, 4 Asts: S. Wheeler, 4	Pts: O. Toppin, 25; Rebs: 3 Tied, 4 Asts: J. Crutcher, 3

Lahaina Civic Center
Maui, HI
Attendance: 2,400
Referees: Terry Wymer, Tim Comer, Tom Eades

ESPN2

November 25, 2019
12:00 p.m. HST

Report

Virginia Tech Hokies 71, No. 3 Michigan State Spartans 66
Scoring by half: 32–28, 39–38
Pts: L. Nolley II, 22; Rebs: P. Horne, 7 Asts: Tied, 5	Pts: A. Henry, 18; Rebs: X. Tillman, 14; Asts: Tied, 3

Lahaina Civic Center
Maui, HI
Attendance: 2,400
Referees: Chris Rastatter, Joe Lindsay, Patrick Evans

ESPNU

November 25, 2019
4:00 p.m. HST

Report

No. 4 Kansas Jayhawks 93, Chaminade Silverswords 63
Scoring by half: 47–27, 46–36
Pts: D. Dotson, 19; Rebs: U. Azubuike, 7 Asts: M. Garrett, 7	Pts: A. Arissol, 18; Rebs: K. Small, 8 Asts: K. Small, 7

Lahaina Civic Center
Maui, HI
Attendance: 2,400
Referees: Mike Scyphers, Keith Kimble, Shawn Lehigh

ESPN2

November 25, 2019
6:30 p.m. HST

Report

BYU Cougars 78, UCLA Bruins 63
Scoring by half: 36–32, 42–31
Pts: J. Toolson, 20; Rebs: Z. Saljaas, 11; Asts: A. Barcello, 5	Pts: J. Bernard, 16; Rebs: Tied, 6 Asts: C. Smith, 6

Lahaina Civic Center
Maui, HI
Attendance: 2,400
Referees: Verne Harris, Les Jones, Ray Perrone

=== Conslation Second Round ===
ESPN2

November 26, 2019
9:30 a.m. HST

Report

Georgia Bulldogs 85, No. 3 Michigan State Spartans 93
Scoring by half: 31–52, 54–41
Pts: A. Edwards, 37; Rebs: A. Edwards, 6 Asts: S. Wheeler, 4	Pts: C. Winston, 28; Rebs: X. Tillman, 11; Asts: C. Winston, 8

Lahaina Civic Center
Maui, HI
Attendance: 2,400
Referees: Verne Harris, Tim Comer, Mike Scyphers

ESPNU

November 26, 2019
12:00 p.m. HST

Report

UCLA Bruins 74, Chaminade Silverswords 48
Scoring by half: 22–16, 52–32
Pts: J. Jaquez Jr., 17; Rebs: J. Jaquez Jr., 12; Asts: T. Campbell, 6	Pts: E. Donley, 10; Rebs: E. Donley, 8 Asts: Tied, 2

Lahaina Civic Center
Maui, HI
Attendance: 2,400
Referees: Tom Eades, Patrick Evans, Shawn Lehigh

=== Semifinals ===
ESPN

November 26, 2019
3:00 p.m. HST

Report

Dayton Flyers 89, Virginia Tech Hokies 62
Scoring by half: 49–31, 40–31
Pts: O. Toppin, 24; Rebs: O. Toppin, 8 Asts: J. Crutcher, 9	Pts: L. Nolley II, 15; Rebs: L. Nolley II, 6 Asts: W. Bede, 6

Lahaina Civic Center
Maui, HI
Attendance: 2,400
Referees: Joe Lindsay, Les Jones, Ray Perrone

ESPN2

November 26, 2019
5:30 p.m. HST

Report

No. 4 Kansas Jayhawks 71, BYU Cougars 56
Scoring by half: 29–27, 42–29
Pts: D. McCormack, 16; Rebs: U. Azubuike, 10; Asts: D. Dotson, 8	Pts: T. Haws, 16; Rebs: Tied, 7 Asts: T. Haws, 5

Lahaina Civic Center
Maui, HI
Attendance: 2,400
Referees: Terry Wymer, Chris Rastatter, Keith Kimble

=== Championship ===
ESPN2

November 27, 2019
12:00 p.m. HST

Report

Dayton Flyers 84, No. 4 Kansas Jayhawks 90 (OT)
Scoring by half: 37–36, 36–37 Overtime: 11–17
Pts: R. Mikesell, 19; Rebs: O. Toppin, 9 Asts: J. Crutcher, 8	Pts: D. Dotson, 31; Rebs: M. Garrett, 7 Asts: Tied, 4

Lahaina Civic Center
Maui, HI
Attendance: 2,400
Referees: Joe Lindsay, Terry Wymer, Verne Harris

=== Third Place Game ===
ESPN2

November 27, 2019
6:30 p.m. HST

Box score

Virginia Tech Hokies 77, BYU Cougars 90
Scoring by half: 37–35, 40–55
Pts: L. Nolley II, 22; Rebs: L. Nolley II, 7 Asts: W. Bede, 7	Pts: T. Haws, 20; Rebs: J. Toolson, 7 Asts: J. Toolson, 8

Lahaina Civic Center
Maui, HI
Attendance: 2,400
Referees: Tom Eades, Les Jones, Tim Comer

=== Fifth Place Game ===
ESPN2

November 27, 2019
9:30 a.m. HST

Report

No. 3 Michigan State Spartans 75, UCLA Bruins 62
Scoring by half: 26–23, 49–39
Pts: C. Winston, 20; Rebs: X. Tillman, 7 Asts: C. Winston, 4	Pts: C. Smith, 13; Rebs: J. Jaquez Jr., 8 Asts: C. Riley, 2

Lahaina Civic Center
Maui, HI
Attendance: 2,400
Referees: Chris Rastatter, Mike Scyphers, Keith Kimble

=== Seventh Place Game ===
ESPNU

November 27, 2019
4:00 p.m. HST

Box score

Georgia Bulldogs 80, Chaminade Silverswords 77
Scoring by half: 38–37, 42–40
Pts: A. Edwards, 24; Rebs: R. Hammonds, 10; Asts: Tied, 3	Pts: A. Arissol, 24; Rebs: K. Small, 7 Asts: K. Small, 8

Lahaina Civic Center
Maui, HI
Attendance: 2,400
Referees: Patrick Evans, Ray Perrone, Shawn Lehigh
