= 2018 Maui Invitational =

College basketball tournament in Hawaii, US

2018 Maui Invitational Tournament
- Season: 2018–19
- Teams: 8
- Finals site: Lahaina Civic Center, Maui, Hawaii
- Champions: Gonzaga (2nd title)
- Runner-up: Duke (6th title game)
- Semifinalists: Auburn (1st semifinal); Arizona (6th semifinal)
- Winning coach: Mark Few (2nd title)
- MVP: Rui Hachimura (Gonzaga)

The 2018 Maui Invitational Tournament was an early-season college basketball tournament played for the 35th time. The tournament began in 1984, and was part of the 2018–19 NCAA Division I men's basketball season. The Championship Round was played at the Lahaina Civic Center in Maui, Hawaii from November 19 to 21, 2018.

== Bracket ==
Fifth Place Game; November 21
San Diego State	57
Iowa State	87
Seventh Place Game; November 21
Xavier	83
Illinois	74

Consolation 2nd Round; November 20
Xavier	74
San Diego State	79
Iowa State	84
Illinois	68

First Round; November 19
8	Auburn	88
Xavier	79
1	Duke	90
San Diego State	64
Arizona	71
Iowa State	66
3	Gonzaga	84
Illinois	78

Semifinals; November 20
8	Auburn	72
1	Duke	78
Arizona	74
3	Gonzaga	91

Championship; November 21
1	Duke	87
3	Gonzaga	89
Third Place Game; November 21
8	Auburn	73
Arizona	57

== Game summaries ==
=== Quarterfinals ===
ESPN2

November 19, 2018
9:30 a.m. HST

Report

No. 8 Auburn Tigers 88, Xavier Musketeers 79 (OT)
Scoring by half: 33–28, 44–49 Overtime: 11–2
Pts: B. Brown, 26; Rebs: C. Okeke, 7 Asts: J. Harper, 8	Pts: R. Welage, 17; Rebs: T. Jones, 9 Asts: Q. Goodin, 6

Lahaina Civic Center
Maui, HI
Attendance: 2,400
Referees: Earl Walton, Eric Curry, Ed Corbett

ESPN2

November 19, 2018
12:00 p.m. HST

Report

No. 1 Duke Blue Devils 90, San Diego State Aztecs 64
Scoring by half: 49–32, 41–32
Pts: R. Barrett, 20; Rebs: J. White, 8 Asts: R. Barrett, 5	Pts: D. Watson, 15; Rebs: J. McDaniels, 5 Asts: Tied, 3

Lahaina Civic Center
Maui, HI
Attendance: 2,400
Referees: Roger Ayers, Paul Szelc, Tim Kelly

ESPNU

November 19, 2018
4:00 p.m. HST

Report

Arizona Wildcats 71, Iowa State Cyclones 66
Scoring by half: 27–36, 44–30
Pts: J. Coleman, 18; Rebs: C. Jeter, 12; Asts: B. Williams, 6	Pts: M. Shayok, 19; Rebs: M. Shayok, 14; Asts: T. Haliburton, 5

Lahaina Civic Center
Maui, HI
Attendance: 2,400
Referees: Ted Valentine, Don Daily, Randy McCall

ESPN2

November 19, 2018
6:30 p.m. HST

Report

No. 3 Gonzaga Bulldogs 84, Illinois Fighting Illini 78
Scoring by half: 39–32, 45–46
Pts: R. Hachimura, 23; Rebs: J. Jones, 11; Asts: J. Perkins, 9	Pts: T. Frazier, 29; Rebs: A. Jordan, 10; Asts: Tied, 3

Lahaina Civic Center
Maui, HI
Attendance: 2,400
Referees: Pat Driscoll, Brian Dorsey, Bernard Clinton

=== Consolation Second Round ===
ESPN2

November 20, 2018
9:30 a.m. HST

Report

Xavier Musketeers 74, San Diego State Aztecs 79
Scoring by half: 40–37, 34–42
Pts: Q. Goodin, 20; Rebs: Tied, 6 Asts: N. Marshall, 5	Pts: J. McDaniels, 26; Rebs: J. McDaniels, 8 Asts: D. Watson, 7

Lahaina Civic Center
Maui, HI
Attendance: 2,400
Referees: Pat Driscoll, Don Daily, Bernard Clinton

ESPN2

November 20, 2018
12:00 p.m. HST

Report

Iowa State Cyclones 83, Illinois Fighting Illini 68
Scoring by half: 34–39, 50–29
Pts: T. Horton-Tucker, 26; Rebs: T. Horton-Tucker, 14; Asts: T. Horton-Tucker, 6	Pts: T. Frazier, 15; Rebs: A. De La Rosa, 7 Asts: T. Frazier, 3

Lahaina Civic Center
Maui, HI
Attendance: 2,400
Referees: Ed Corbett, Paul Szelc, Tim Kelly

=== Semifinals ===
ESPN

November 20, 2018
3:00 p.m. HST

Report

No. 8 Auburn Tigers 72, No. 1 Duke Blue Devils 78
Scoring by half: 33–41, 39–37
Pts: J. Harper, 22; Rebs: A. McLemore, 12; Asts: J. Harper, 6	Pts: Tied, 18; Rebs: 3 Tied, 9 Asts: T. Jones, 6

Lahaina Civic Center
Maui, HI
Attendance: 2,400
Referees: Ted Valentine, Randy McCall, Eric Curry

ESPN

November 20, 2018
5:30 p.m. HST

Report

Arizona Wildcats 74, No. 3 Gonzaga Bulldogs 91
Scoring by half: 45–37, 29–54
Pts: J. Coleman, 28; Rebs: R. Luther, 8 Asts: B. Williams, 2	Pts: R. Hachimura, 24; Rebs: Z. Norvell Jr., 10; Asts: J. Perkins, 9

Lahaina Civic Center
Maui, HI
Attendance: 2,400
Referees: Roger Ayers, Brian Dorsey, Earl Walton

=== Championship ===
ESPN

November 21, 2018
12:00 p.m. HST

Report

No. 1 Duke Blue Devils 87, No. 3 Gonzaga Bulldogs 89
Scoring by half: 39–47, 48–42
Pts: R. Barrett, 23; Rebs: Z. Williamson, 10; Asts: Tied, 3	Pts: R. Hachimura, 20; Rebs: R. Hachimura, 7 Asts: J. Perkins, 7

Lahaina Civic Center
Maui, HI
Attendance: 2,400
Referees: Ted Valentine, Pat Driscoll, Randy McCall

=== Third Place Game ===
ESPN2

November 21, 2018
6:30 p.m. HST

Report

No. 8 Auburn Tigers 73, Arizona Wildcats 57
Scoring by half: 28–22, 45–35
Pts: B. Brown, 19; Rebs: C. Okeke, 6 Asts: J. Harper, 5	Pts: B. Randolph, 18; Rebs: Tied, 5 Asts: J. Coleman, 5

Lahaina Civic Center
Maui, HI
Attendance: 2,400
Referees: Ed Corbett, Bernard Clinton, Paul Szelc

=== Fifth Place Game ===
ESPN2

November 21, 2018
9:30 a.m. HST

Report

San Diego State Aztecs 57, Iowa State Cyclones 87
Scoring by half: 32–46, 25–41
Pts: M. Mitchell, 14; Rebs: J. McDaniels, 7 Asts: Tied, 2	Pts: M. Shayok, 21; Rebs: Tied, 8 Asts: N. Weiler-Babb, 6

Lahaina Civic Center
Maui, HI
Attendance: 2,400
Referees: Eric Curry, Tim Kelly, Brian Dorsey

=== Seventh Place Game ===
ESPNU

November 21, 2018
4:00 p.m. HST

Report

Xavier Musketeers 83, Illinois Fighting Illini 74
Scoring by half: 43–41, 40–33
Pts: Q. Goodin, 15; Rebs: T. Jones, 9 Asts: N. Marshall, 5	Pts: A. Dosunmu, 19; Rebs: A. De La Rosa, 6 Asts: A. Jordan, 4

Lahaina Civic Center
Maui, HI
Attendance: 2,400
Referees: Roger Ayers, Don Daily, Earl Walton
