= 1990 Maui Invitational =

1990 Maui Invitational Tournament
- Season: 1990–91
- Teams: 8
- Finals site: Lahaina Civic Center; Maui, Hawaii
- Champions: Syracuse (1st title)
- Runner-up: Indiana (1st title game)
- Semifinalists: Iowa State; Santa Clara
- Winning coach: Jim Boeheim (1st title)
- MVP: Billy Owens (Syracuse)

The 1990 Maui Invitational Tournament was an early-season college basketball tournament that was played, for the 7th time, from November 23 to November 25, 1990. The tournament, which began in 1984, was part of the 1990-91 NCAA Division I men's basketball season. The tournament was played at the Lahaina Civic Center in Maui, Hawaii and was won by the Syracuse Orange. It was the first title for the program and its head coach Jim Boeheim.

== Bracket ==
5th place game
Toledo	82
Northeastern	78
7th place game
Chaminade	129
Loyola Marymount	162

Consolation 2nd Round
Chaminade	100
Toledo	108
Loyola Marymount	123
Northeastern	152

First Round
Chaminade	82
Iowa State	115
Toledo	68
13	Syracuse	84
Loyola Marymount	93
Santa Clara	100
8	Indiana	100
Northeastern	78

Semifinals
Iowa State	67
13	Syracuse	83
Santa Clara	69
8	Indiana	74

Championship
13	Syracuse	77
8	Indiana	74
3rd place game
Iowa State	62
Santa Clara	78
