= 2025–26 Michigan State Spartans men's basketball team =

American college basketball season

2025–26 Michigan State Spartans men's basketball

Fort Myers Tip-Off Beach Division champions

NCAA tournament, Sweet Sixteen
- Conference: Big Ten Conference

Ranking
- Coaches: No. 11
- AP: No. 11
- Record: 27–8 (15–5 Big Ten)
- Head coach: Tom Izzo (31st season)
- Associate head coach: Doug Wojcik (7th overall season)
- Assistant coaches: Thomas Kelley (4th season); Saddi Washington (2nd season); Jon Borovich (2nd season); Austin Thornton (2nd season)
- Captains: Coen Carr; Carson Cooper; Jeremy Fears Jr.; Jaxon Kohler
- Home arena: Breslin Center

2025–26 Big Ten Conference men's basketball standings
	Conf.				Overall
Team	W		L	PCT	W		L	PCT
No. 1 Michigan	19	–	1	.950	37	–	3	.925
No. 14 Nebraska	15	–	5	.750	28	–	7	.800
No. 5 Illinois	15	–	5	.750	28	–	9	.757
No. 11 Michigan State	15	–	5	.750	27	–	8	.771
No. 25 Wisconsin	14	–	6	.700	24	–	11	.686
No. 6 Purdue †	13	–	7	.650	30	–	9	.769
UCLA	13	–	7	.650	24	–	12	.667
Ohio State	12	–	8	.600	21	–	13	.618
No. 15 Iowa	10	–	10	.500	24	–	13	.649
Indiana	9	–	11	.450	18	–	14	.563
Minnesota	8	–	12	.400	15	–	18	.455
USC	7	–	13	.350	18	–	14	.563
Washington	7	–	13	.350	16	–	17	.485
Rutgers	6	–	14	.300	14	–	20	.412
Northwestern	5	–	15	.250	15	–	19	.441
Oregon	5	–	15	.250	12	–	20	.375
Maryland	4	–	16	.200	12	–	21	.364
Penn State	3	–	17	.150	12	–	20	.375
† 2026 Big Ten tournament winner Rankings from AP poll

The 2025–26 Michigan State Spartans men's basketball team represented Michigan State University in the 2025–26 NCAA Division I men's basketball season. The Spartans were led by 31st-year head coach Tom Izzo and played their home games at Breslin Center in East Lansing, Michigan as members of the Big Ten Conference. The Spartans finished the season 27–8, 15–5 in Big Ten play to finish in a three-way tie for second place. As the No. 3 seed in the Big Ten tournament, they lost to UCLA in the quarterfinals. The Spartans received an at-large bid to the NCAA tournament for the 28th consecutive tournament, the longest current streak in the country. MSU defeated North Dakota State and Louisville to advance to the Sweet Sixteen for 23rd time in school history and the 17th time under Tom Izzo. There they lost to No 2-seeded and eventual national runners-up UConn.

With a win over USC on January 5, 2026, Tom Izzo earned his 750th career victory.

With 13 assists in a loss to UCLA on March 13, Jeremy Fears Jr. surpassed Cassius Winston for the most assists by a Spartan in a season. Fears added 16 assists in the second game of the NCAA tournament, setting a record for most assists by a Spartan in a tournament game.

Fears was named to several All-American teams.

== Previous season ==
The Spartans finished the 2024–25 season 30–7, 17–3 in Big Ten play to win the regular season championship by three games. They defeated Oregon in the quarterfinals of the Big Ten tournament before losing to Wisconsin. They received an at-large bid to the NCAA tournament as the No. 2 seed in the South region for the 27th consecutive tournament, the nation's longest active streak. They defeated Bryant in the first round and New Mexico in the second round to advance to the Sweet Sixteen. It marked the 16th Sweet Sixteen appearance under Izzo and the school's 22nd overall. MSU defeated Ole Miss to advance to the Elite Eight where they lost to overall No. 1 seed Auburn.

The Big Ten named Tom Izzo the conference's coach of the year for the fourth time. Freshman Jase Richardson was selected to the All-Big Ten third team and the All-Freshman team. Jaden Akins was named to the All-Defensive team and the coaches' third team. Associate head coach Doug Wojcik was named the Howard Moore assistant coach of the year.

The Spartans were led by Akins with 12.8 points per game and Richardson with 12.1 points per game. Jeremy Fears Jr. averaged 4.4 assists per game while Jaxon Kohler averaged 7.5 rebounds.

== Offseason ==
=== Departures ===
On April 1, 2025, it was announced that forward Xavier Booker and guards Tre Holloman and Gehrig Norman had entered the transfer portal. On April 8, freshman guard Jase Richardson announced he would enter the NBA draft. On April 4, Booker announced he was transferring to UCLA. On April 11, Holloman announced he would play for NC State. Normand announced he would transfer to Santa Clara on April 20.

Departures
Name	No.	Pos.	Height	Weight	Year	Hometown	Notes
Jaden Akins	3	G	6'4"	195	Sr	Farmington, MI	Graduated
Xavier Booker	34	F	6'11"	240	SO	Indianapolis, IN	Transferred to UCLA
Frankie Fidler	8	G	6'7"	217	Sr	Bellevue, NE	Graduated
Tre Holloman	5	G	6'2"	185	JR	St. Paul, MN	Transferred to NC State
Gehrig Normand	7	G	6'5"	190	RS FR	North Richland Hills, TX	Transferred to Santa Clara
Jase Richardson	11	G	6'3"	185	Fr	Las Vegas, NV	Selected 25th overall in the 2025 NBA Draft by the Orlando Magic
Szymon Zapala	10	C	7'0"	245	Sr	Zaborze, Poland	Graduated

=== Incoming transfers ===
On April 10, 2025, Florida Atlantic forward Kaleb Glenn announced he would transfer to Michigan State. On April 18, Samford guard Trey Fort announced he would also transfer to Michigan State. On May 10, Harvard guard and son of associate head coach Doug Wojcik, Denham Wojcik, announced he would transfer to MSU for his senior season. On May 18, point guard Divine Ugochukwu announced he would transfer from Miami to play with the Spartans.

Transfers
Name	No.	Pos.	Height	Weight	Year	Hometown	Previous school
Trey Fort	9	G	6'4"	200	Sr	Florence, MS	Samford
Kaleb Glenn	8	F	6'6"	210	Jr	La Porte, IN	Florida Atlantic
Divine Ugochukwu	99	G	6'3"	190	So	Sugar Land, TX	Miami
Denham Wojcik	10	G	6'2"	190	Sr	Charleston, SC	Harvard

=== Recruiting class ===
On October 10, 2024, MSU received its first commit in the 2025 recruiting class when four-star small forward Jordan Scott announced he would play for the Spartans in 2025. On October 20, four-star power forward Cam Ward announced he would also play for Michigan State in 2025.

College recruiting
Name	Hometown	School	Height	Weight	Commit date
Jordan Scott; SF	Reston, VA	South Lakes High School	6 ft 7 in (2.01 m)	185 lb (84 kg)	October 10, 2024 (verbal)
Jordan Scott; SF	Recruit ratings: Rivals: 247Sports: On3: ESPN:				
Cam Ward; PF	Upper Marlboro, MD	Largo High School	6 ft 7 in (2.01 m)	210 lb (95 kg)	October 22, 2024 (verbal)
Cam Ward; PF	Recruit ratings: Rivals: 247Sports: On3: ESPN:				
Overall recruit ranking: 247Sports: 34 On3: 14
Note: In many cases, Scout, Rivals, 247Sports, On3, and ESPN may conflict in their listings of height and weight.; In these cases, the average was taken. ESPN grades are on a 100-point scale.; Sources: "Michigan State - ESPN Recruiting". ESPN.; "2025–26 Michigan State Spartans men's basketball team". 247Sports.; "2025–26 Michigan State Spartans men's basketball team". On3.

=== Injuries ===
On June 18, 2025, it was announced that transfer Kaleb Glenn had suffered a knee injury and would miss the upcoming season.

== Preseason ==
=== Captains ===
On September 22, 2025, prior to the team's first official practice, Tom Izzo announced that Coen Carr, Carson Cooper, Jeremy Fears Jr., and Jaxon Kohler had been named the team's captains for the season.

=== Preseason Big Ten poll ===
Michigan State was picked to finish in sixth place in the conference by an annual, unofficial preseason poll of basketball writers. No Spartan was named to the conference's preseason All-Big Ten team.

=== Preseason rankings ===
The Spartans were ranked 22nd in the preseason AP poll. MSU was ranked No. 23 in the Coaches Poll.

=== Exhibition games ===
The Spartans played their first exhibition game on October 23, 2025 against Bowling Green at Breslin Center. Coen Carr led the Spartans with 17 points and added five rebounds and five blocks. Jaxon Kohler notched 15 points and 10 rebounds. The Spartans led by nine at the half, but the Falcons tied the game at 57 halfway through the second half. Jeremy Fears Jr. scored 12 points and had a game-high nine assists as the Spartans pulled away for a 75–66 win. Tom Izzo was not happy with MSU's poor play defensively despite the win.

In the final exhibition game played on October 28, the Spartans traveled to face No. 4-ranked UConn in Hartford. The Spartans fell behind early, failing to make a two-point basket until less than eight minutes were left in the half. They trailed 44–33 at the half. They fell behind by as many as 19 in the second half, but also drew to within eight with 13:17 to play. Jeremy Fears Jr. led the Spartans with 14 points and had six assists, but also committed six turnovers. Carson Cooper scored 12 while Coen Carr scored 11. The Spartans missed 15 free throws in the game as they lost 76–69. The Huskies had three players commit five or more fouls, but those players continued to play in the exhibition game.

== Regular season ==
=== Colgate ===
The Spartans began the regular season against Colgate on November 3 at Breslin Center. MSU failed to take control of the game early, struggling defensively and leading by only three at halftime. In the second half, the Raiders tied the game twice before the Spartans used a 21–6 run to pull away for the 80–69 win. Jaxon Kohler notched a double-double with 16 points and 15 rebounds while Jeremy Fears Jr. also had a double-double, 14 points and 10 assists. Fears added five rebounds and five steals in the win. The Spartans moved to 1–0 on the season. Tom Izzo was disappointed with the performance noting, "So a lot of work to do or we're going to get our ass embarrassed on Saturday."

=== Arkansas ===
The Spartans next faced No. 14 Arkansas on November 8 in East Lansing. The Spartans shot poorly from three, making only one of 14 attempts, but freshman Cam Ward had a breakout game, scoring 18 points and adding 10 rebounds. Coen Carr scored 15 on several dunks, mostly in the first half. The Spartans trailed by three at halftime but pulled out to an eight-point lead with seven minutes remaining. From there, the Razorback went on a 13–5 to run to tie the game at 66 with 1:41 left. After a Carson Cooper free throw, Jeremy Fears Jr. got his defender in the air to force a foul while behind the three-point arc. Fears made two of the free throws to stretch the lead to three. Jordan Scott missed two free throws with 15 seconds remaining that would have put the game away, but MSU's defense did not allow an easy shot as they held on for the 69–66 win. Fears went 0–7 from the field as MSU only made one three-pointer. Jaxon Kohler was the only other Spartan in double digits with 10 points. The win moved MSU to 2–0 on the season.

=== San Jose State ===
MSU next played the Spartans of San Jose State on November 13. MSU started well, jumping out to a 16–2 lead and dominating the first half. Michigan State led 46–23 at the half. In the second half, SJSU narrowed the lead, but was never able to get to single digits. Carson Cooper scored a career-high 17 points, but missed five free throws. Jaxon Kohler notched another double-double with 17 points and a career-high 18 rebounds. Jeremy Fears Jr. scored 15 for the Spartans with nine assists to help the Spartans pull away for a 79–60 win. Tom Izzo was not happy with his team's performance after the game as the Spartans moved to 3–0 on the season.

=== Kentucky ===
The Spartans travelled to face No. 12-ranked Kentucky in the Champions Classic at Madison Square Garden on November 18. MSU fell behind early, trailing 15–12 six minutes into the game. However, the Spartans, who entered the game making only 21.7% of their three-pointers, went off from three-point land, making 11 of 22 threes in the game and leading by 17 at the half. In the second half, Kentucky got as close as 10, but the Spartans answered and led by as many as 21 as they routed the Wildcats 83–66. Jaxon Kohler led the Spartans with 20 points including making both of his three-point attempts. Jeremy Fears Jr. took only three shots, but scored eight points and handed out a career-high 13 assists in the win. Kur Teng had a career-high 15 points off the bench as Trey Fort added 13 in the win. The win was the second against a ranked team on the season and pushed MSU to 4–0 to start the season.

=== Detroit Mercy ===
The team returned home to face Detroit Mercy, coached by former MSU assistant coach Mark Montgomery, on November 21. The Spartans led from the outset, easily defeating the Titans 84–56. Jeremy Fears Jr. scored a career-high 18 points while dishing out 11 assists. Four Spartans scored in double figures in the easy win. The win moved MSU to 5–0 on the season, their first 5–0 start to a season since 2020.

=== Fort Myers Tip-Off ===
The Spartans next travelled to Fort Myers, Florida to participate in the Fort Myers Tip-Off, an un-bracketed multiteam event.

==== East Carolina ====
In the first game of the Tip-Off, MSU played East Carolina on November 25. The Pirates tied the game at nine with a little more than 13 minutes left in the half. However, the Spartans dominated the game from there, going on a 14–2 run to put the game away. MSU led 47–24 at the half. In the second half, MSU used a 23–1 run to cruise to an 89–56 win. Jaxon Kohler made all six shots he took, scoring 16 points and grabbing eight rebounds. Divine Ugochukwu scored a career-high 16 while missing only one shot. Jeremy Fears Jr. had nine assists while Coen Carr added 13 points in the blowout win. The win moved MSU to 6–0 on the season.

==== North Carolina ====
The Spartans next faced No. 16-ranked North Carolina on Thanksgiving Day in the final game of the Tip-Off. The game remained close until the Tarheels went on a 7–0 run to take a 22–15 lead with 7:42 left in the first half. From there, the Spartans went on a 16–5 run to take a five-point led at halftime. In the second half, MSU held the lead throughout, pushing the lead to double digits and winning easily 74–58. Jeremy Fears Jr. had a career-high 19 points with seven assists. Carson Cooper scored 13 while Cam Ward added 11 in the win. Jaxon Kohler notched another double double, with 10 points and 11 rebounds. The Spartans shot 52% from the field while limiting UNC to only 38%. The win moved MSU to 7–0 to start the season, their best start since 2015.

=== Iowa ===
The Spartans, ranked No,. 7 in the AP poll, returned home to play their first conference game of the season against Iowa on December 2. Iowa took the early lead, scoring the first five points as both teams struggled shooting the ball early. Jeremy Fears Jr. made two free throws with 9:52 left in the first half to give the Spartans an 11–9 lead. MSU did not surrender the lead again, blowing out the Hawkeyes 71–52. The Spartans led by as many as 23 in the game and were led by Coen Carr's 15 points. Jaxon Kohler notched another double double with 12 points and 11 rebounds. Fears added 14 points in the easy win. The Spartans shot 50% from the field while limiting Iowa to 38%. Freshman Cam Ward did not play due to a sprained wrist. The win moved MSU to 8–0 on the season and 1–0 in conference play.

=== Duke ===
The Spartans next played No. 4-ranked and undefeated Duke on December 6 at Breslin Center. MSU started well, leading for most of the first half as they held Duke big man Cameron Boozer to only two points. Jaxon Kohler hit four three-pointers in the first half as MSU took a 34–31 lead at the break. In the second half, Boozer scored 16 as the Blue Devils were able to hold off the Spartans for 66–60 win. Carson Cooper had 16 points and 16 rebounds in the loss. Jeremy Fears Jr. struggled from the field, missing all 10 shots, but making all six free throws. Fears did dish out 13 assists while Kohler scored 14 (only two in the second half) and had seven rebounds. The loss marked the Spartans first of the season and dropped them to 8–1.

=== Penn State ===
The Spartans, now ranked No. 9 in the country, went on the road to play Penn State on December 13. The Spartans led through for the first 10 minutes before the Nittany Lions closed the half on a 24–16 run to lead by three. In the second half, the Spartans tried to pull away, leading by 10, but PSU rallied to keep the game close. Divine Ugochukwu scored a career-high 23 points for the Spartans, making all five his three-point attempts, and hit a pair of free throws with eight seconds left to ensure the MSU victory. The 76–72 win marked the first time on the season the Spartans had allowed an opponent to score more than 69 points in a game. Jaxon Kohler recorded another double double, scoring 10 and grabbing 12 rebounds. Carson Cooper added 10 as the Spartans moved to 9–1 on the season and 2–0 in conference play

=== Toledo ===
The Spartans will begin a stretch of three games against non-conference foes to wrap up the non-conference portion of their schedule. On December 16, they played Toledo at Breslin Center. MSU started off hot, led by Jaxon Kohler, and ran away to a 30-point halftime lead. In the second half, the Spartans struggled with turnover, but still led by as many as 32 while holding on for a 92–69 win. Kohler notched another double double, scoring a team-high 16 points while grabbing 13 rebounds. Jeremy Fears Jr. added 15 points despite missing seven shots and had eight assists. Coen Carr added 14 points in the win. MSU moved to 10–1 on the season.

=== Oakland ===
The Spartans Oakland at Little Caesars Arena in Detroit on December 20. The game remained close throughout as the team's exchanged leads in first half. MSU led by three at the break and extended the lead to as many 11 on a few occasions, but the Grizzlies kept the game close. Coen Carr scored a career-high 22 points while Carson Cooper added 15. Jaxon Kohler again had a double double, scoring 13 and grabbing 13 rebounds. MSU held on for the 79–70 win. Tom Izzo and Oakland coach Greg Kampe each wore holiday sweaters as has become the custom when the teams play each other. The win moved MSU to 11–1 on the season.

=== Cornell ===
After eight days off, the Spartans played their final non-conference game of the season against Cornell on December 29. The Big Red took an early lead and led for most of the first 12 minutes of the game before a Kur Teng three gave the Spartans their first lead. Cornell stayed closed as both offenses performed well, but a Jeremy Fears Jr. basket as the buzzer sounded gave MSU the 55–53 halftime lead. In the second half, MSU pulled away, leading by as many as 20 and held on for a 114–97 win. Fears had a career-high 21 points while adding 11 assists for the Spartans. Jaxon Kohler had his fourth straight double double, scoring 11 and grabbing 10 rebounds. Coen Carr scored 19 as MSU scored the most points in a game since 2008. The win moved MSU to 12–1 on the season.

=== Nebraska ===
MSU returned to Big Ten play against No. 13-ranked and unbeaten Nebraska at Pinnacle Bank Arena on January 2, 2026. The game remained close throughout, both teams shooting around 30% from the field in the game. Jaxon Kohler made five of six three-point attempts to lead the Spartans with 19 points and added 11 rebounds. Jeremy Fears Jr. had 14 points and seven assists, but it was not enough as Nebraska held on at home for the 58–56 win. The loss dropped the Spartans to 12–2, 2–1 on the season.

=== USC ===
The Spartans, now ranked No. 12 in the country, returned home to face USC on January 5. MSU started poorly as USC took a 5–0 and the Spartans failed to score until almost three minutes into the game. From there however, the Spartans routed the Trojans. USC was limited to 33% from the field and 18% from three while the Spartans made 50% of their shots. Coen Carr scored 18 to lead all scorers and Jaxon Kohler scored 16 and grabbed eight rebounds. MSU led 33–17 at the half and won 80–51 to move their record to 13–2, 3–1 on the season. Jeremey Fears Jr. had 15 points and seven assists in the win. The win also marked Tom Izzo's 750th career win.

=== Northwestern ===
MSU next played Northwestern at Breslin Center on January 8. The team's exchanged the lead throughout the first half until MSU took a 28–24 lead with five minutes left in the half. From there, the Wildcats outscored the Spartans 11–0 to take a 35–28 lead at the break. In the second half, Northwestern continued to hold the lead before a technical was called on Tom Izzo. MSU took control from there, outscoring Northwestern 38–21 to pull out a 76–66 win. Carson Cooper led the Spartans with 18 points and nine rebounds. Jaxon Kohler scored 15, including three three-pointers. Jeremy Fears failed to score in the first half as he was in foul trouble, but added 15 points in the second half to help secure the win. The win moved MSU to 14–2, 4–1 on the season.

=== Indiana ===
The Spartans finished their three-game homestand with a game against Indiana on January 13. Jeremy Fears scored MSU's first 10 points before Jaxon Kohler made a three-pointer with 10:11 left in the first half to narrow the Hoosiers lead to 17–13. The game remained close, but MSU took the lead with just less than six minutes left in the half and led by seven at the break. In the second half, the game remained close and was tied at 53 with 11 minutes left. From there, the Spartans went on a 19–0 and 28–2 run to blow out Indiana. Fears scored a career-high 23 points, 19 in the first half, and notched a double double with 10 assists. Kohler also had a double double, 16 points and 10 rebounds. MSU won easily 81–60. The win moved MSU to 15–2, 5–1 on the season.

=== Washington ===
MSU travelled to the West Coast for a two-game road trip, playing Washington in Seattle on January 17. The game started close and the teams were tied with just under 14 minutes left in the first half. However, the Spartans went on a 10–0 run and never trailed again. MSU led by eight at the half, but the Huskies could never get within six from there. Jeremy Fears scored 19 points and added five assists. Jaxon Kohler, shooting over 50% from three on the season, missed all five three-point attempts in the game and only scored seven points. Kur Teng made three threes and scored 11 while Carson Cooper added 10. The Spartans controlled the second half and won easily 80–63. The win moved MSU to 16–2 overall, 6–1 in conference.

=== Oregon ===
MSU, now ranked No, 10 in the country, completed their road trip with a game against Oregon on January 20 in Eugene. Neither team played well in the first half and the Spartans carried only a 28–26 lead into halftime. In the second half, the game remained close until Oregon narrowed the lead to 42–21 with 10:43 remaining. From there, the Spartans outscored the Ducks 26–11 to win by 16 points. Coen Carr had eight rebounds and 15 points, making three of five three-point attempts. Carson Cooper led MSU with a career-high 19 points and seven rebounds. Jeremy Fears scored 14 and added five assists in the game. The Spartans improved their record to 7–1 in conference and 17–2 overall.

=== Maryland ===
The Spartans returned home to face Maryland on January 24. The Spartans jumped on the Terrapins from the get go, taking a 24–4 lead with less than 12 minutes left in the half. MSU kept the foot on the gas and blew out Maryland 91–48. The win marked the largest conference win for the Spartans since 2000 against rival Michigan. Jeremy Fears scored 17 points and had a career-high 17 assists, becoming the first play in Big Ten history to score 17 points and have 17 assists. It was the second most assists in a game in MSU history, following Mateen Cleaves' 20 in 2000. Coen Carr and Carson Cooper each scored 14 in the win. MSU shot 61% from the floor and 47% from three in the rout. The Spartans moved to 18–2 overall and 8–1 in conference with the win.

=== Rutgers ===
MSU now ranked No. 7 in the AP poll, took to the road to face Rutgers in Piscataway, New Jersey on January 27. With a game against rival Michigan looming for the Spartans, MSU looked like they were overlooking the Scarlet Knights. MSU play poorly throughout and trailed by nine at half time. The Spartans committed 10 turnovers in the first half and Jeremy Fears sat for a good portion of the half with foul trouble while managing only two points in the half. In the second half, Michigan State mounted several runs to draw close, but it seemed Rutgers would answer every one as they led throughout the half. Rutgers took a 67–60 lead with 2:48 left, but from there, despite missing a free throw, the Spartans went on a 10–5 run, led by Jeremy Fears, to pull within two with 17 seconds left. Rutgers missed one of two free throws to push the lead to three. However, MSU's Divine Ogochukwu hit a three to tie it with 11 seconds left to tie the game. Rutgers missed a shot as time expired to send the game to overtime. Fears continued to control the game as MSU pulled away for an 88–79 win. Fears scored a career-high 29 points, including making 16 of 17 free throw attempts, to lead the Spartans. Three other MSU players scored in double digits in the win. With a loss by Nebraska, the win moved MSU into a three-way tie for first in the conference with a 9–1 record, 19–2 overall.

=== Michigan ===
The Spartans returned home to face rival and No. 3-ranked Michigan on January 30. The Wolverines blitzed MSU from the get go, jumping to a 20–7 with less than nine minutes remaining in the first half. Michigan pushed the lead to as many as 18 in the half and led by 16 at the break, as MSU struggled with turnovers. To begin the second half, the Spartans went on a 29–13 run to tie the game with 7:57 left. MSU even took the lead, led by Jeremy Fears career-high 31 points, but few other Spartans contributed as the Wolverines held MSU off for the 83–71 win. Jaxon Kohler had 12 points, but missed nine of his 13 shots while Coen Carr and Jordan Scott added 10 each. The loss dropped the Spartans out of a first-place tie in the Big Ten at 9–2 and 19–3 on the season.

=== Minnesota ===
MSU, now ranked No. 10 in the country, played Minnesota on February 4 at Williams Arena. The Spartans again started slow, scoring only 21 points in the first half and trailing by 11 at halftime. The Spartans were able to narrow the lead to five on several occasions early in the second half, but the Gophers answered every run. Their response was aided by a technical foul by Jeremy Fears. The Gophers pulled away and led by 15 with four minutes left. From there, MSU outscored the Gophers 21–8 to pull within two points with 20 seconds left. However, after a made free throw by Minnesota, Jaxon Kohler missed a three that would have tied it and the Spartans lost 76–73. The loss dropped MSU to 19–4, 9–3 in conference play. After the game, Tom Izzo threatened to not start Fears in the next because of his actions in the game, including the technical foul.

=== Illinois ===
The Spartans returned to Breslin to face one of the hottest teams in the country in No. 5-ranked Illinois on February 7. A few days before, it was announced that Divine Ugochokwu would miss the remainder of the season due to a broken foot. Illinois, winners of 12 straight games, led throughout the first half after MSU led 2–0 to start the game. The Illini led by four at halftime and pushed their lead to as many as nine early in the second half. However, Jeremy Fears scored 22 of his 26 points after halftime as MSU and Illinois exchanged leads down the stretch. Trailing by one with 30 seconds remaining, Kur Teng missed a three that would have given MSU the lead, but Jaxon Kohler gathered the rebound and fed Teng for another three-point attempt. This time, the shot was good and MSU led by two with eight seconds remaining. A foul by Fears with one second left on a rebound gave Illinois two free throws to tie the game at 71 and force overtime. In overtime, Fears scored 11 of the Spartans' 14 points to give them the 85–82 win. The win marked the first time the Spartans had beat a top-five since 2022. Only three other Spartans scored in double figures in the game. Fears added 15 assists and played 43 minutes. The win moved MSU to 20–4 overall and 10–3 in conference play.

=== Wisconsin ===
MSU looked to stay in the race for the conference championship as they visited Wisconsin at the Kohl Center. Coen Carr hit his first shot of the night, a three-pointer that drew the Spartans even at three less than 50 seconds into the game. From there, MSU trailed for the remainder of the game as the Badgers dominated the Spartans. Wisconsin led by as many as 18 in the first half and 21 in the second half as they won easily, 92–71. Carr scored 19 to lead the Spartans while Jeremy Fears scored 14 points and added 12 assists. The loss dropped MSU out of realistic contention for the Big Ten championship at 10–4 and 20–5 overall.

=== UCLA ===
MSU, now ranked No. 15 in the country, returned home to face UCLA on February 17. The game started close and was tied at nine five minutes into the game. From there, the Spartans outscored the Bruins 34–14 to take a 20-point lead at the half. MSU cruised from there, leading by as many as 31 in an easy 82–59 win. The Spartans made a season-high 14 threes on 27 attempts while Jeremy Fears hit a career-high four three-pointers en route to 16 points and 10 assists. Coen Car scored 16 points as well and Jaxon Kohler collected 10 rebounds in the easy win. The Spartans moved to 21–5, 11–4 in conference with the win.

=== Ohio State ===
On February 22, the Spartans played Ohio State at Breslin Center. The teams exchanged early, but the Buckeyes pulled out to a six-point lead midway through the first half. MSU narrowed the lead to only three at the break. In the second half, the game remained close as the teams again exchanged the lead. The Spartans finally appeared to have worn down OSU and took a 10-point lead with 1:35 left. However, missed free throws and turnovers allowed the Buckeyes to draw within three. The Spartans made three of their final four free throws and forced a miss to hold on for a 66–60 win. Carson Cooper led the Spartans with a career-high 20 points and added 11 rebounds. Jordan Scott scored 12 while Jeremy Fears scored 11. The win moved MSU to 22–5 overall and 12–4 in conference play.

=== Purdue ===
The Spartans, now ranked No. 13, travelled to face No. 8 Purdue in West Lafayette, IN on February 26. MSU entered the game having lost seven straight games in Mackey Arena with their last win coming in 2014. The game did not start well for the Spartans as they fell behind 9–2 and 13–7. However, MSU rallied to take the lead and the game remained close throughout the first half. Purdue led by three at the break and the teams continued to exchange the lead in the second half. Carson Cooper played well again, leading the Spartans with 15 points and six rebounds. Jeremy Fears scored 12 while Kur Teng hit three threes and scored 13. Coen Carr, as usual, had several highlight dunks as MSU pulled out to an eight-point lead with four minutes remaining. Purdue got within two on a couple of occasions, but Braden Smith missed a three-point shot as time expired to give MSU the 76–74 win. The win moved MSU to 23–5 and 13–4 in conference.

=== Indiana ===
On the first day of March, MSU stayed in Indiana to play the Hoosiers. The Spartans started well and never trailed in the game. Jaxon Kohler made seven of 12 baskets and scored 21 points while grabbing 13 rebounds. Jeremy Fears also scored 21 while adding nine assists. Kur Teng made six of eight three pointers to score a career-high 18 as MSU won easily 77–64. The win was MSU's fourth straight and moved them to 24–5 overall and 14–5 in conference play with two games left in the regular season.

=== Rutgers ===
On Senior Night on March 5, the Spartans, now ranked number eight in the country, faced Rutgers for the second time with a chance to clinch a triple bye in the Big Ten tournament. MSU struggled in the first half, turning the ball over 10 times and trailing for a good portion of the half. However, the Spartans scored the final four points of the half to take a 31–30 lead. In the second half, MSU blew the game open, pushing the lead to as many as 19. Leading by 14 with 1:19 left, Tom Izzo substituted seniors Trey Fort, Denham Wojcik, and Nick Sanders into the game so that all seniors, including Jaxon Kohler and Carson Cooper, were on the floor. From there, Rutgers hit several three-pointers including a four-point play on a foul by Wojcik to narrow the lead to two with two seconds remaining. However, Jeremy Fears hit two free throws to give the Spartans the four-point win, 91–87. Fears had 21 points and eight assists while Coen Carr added 21 as well. Cooper scored 14 while Kohler scored 15 in their last games at Breslin Center. The win clinched a triple bye for the Spartans in the Big Ten tournament and move their record to 25–5, 15–4 on the season.

=== Michigan ===
The Spartans finished the regular season on March 8 by travelling to face the conference champions, Michigan. The game remained close throughout as initial offensive struggles gave way to good offense and a one-point lead at the half by the Wolverines. There were two technical fouls on each team and a flagrant foul on Michigan's Aday Mara. Jaxon Kohler led the Spartans with 23 points and eight rebounds while Jeremy Fears added 22 points and nine assists. Carson Cooper scored 19, but it was not enough as Michigan hit big shots when they needed them to win 90–80. MSU finished the season 25–6, 15–5 to finish tied for second in the Big Ten.

== Postseason ==
=== Big Ten tournament ===
The Spartans finished conference play in a three-way tie for second place. They earned a triple-bye into the quarterfinals of the Big Ten tournament.

==== UCLA ====
Due to tiebreaking rules, the Spartans were the No. 3 seed in the Big Ten tournament. They faced UCLA in the quarterfinals on March 13. The game was close early until MSU tied it at 14 with 12:14 left in the half. From there, UCLA never trailed. The Bruins took a 44–33 at the half as MSU struggled defensively. Every time MSU made a run, their poor defensive coverage allowed UCLA to pull away again. The Spartans narrowed the lead to two with six seconds left, but the Bruins hit free throws to win 88–84. The loss eliminated the Spartans from the tournament and dropped them to 25–7 on the season.

=== NCAA tournament ===
The Spartans received an at-large bid as the No. 3 seed in the East region of the NCAA tournament. The bid was the team's 39th NCAA tournament appearance and, the 28th consecutive under Tom Izzo.

==== North Dakota State ====
The Spartans, now ranked No. 11 in the nation, faced No. 14 seed North Dakota State on March 19 in Buffalo, New York. The Spartans dominated the game, leading by as many 28 points and cruising to a 92–67 win. Carson Cooper led the Spartans with 20 points and 10 rebounds while Jeremy Fears Jr. had 11 assists. MSU shot 59% from the field and 50% from three in the win. The win moved MSU to the second round of the NCAA tournament for the fifth consecutive year and the 22nd time in 28 consecutive appearances under Tom Izzo.

==== Louisville ====
The Spartans faced No. 6 seed Louisville on March 21. MSU took the lead with 15:35 left in the first half and never trailed again. The Cardinals kept the game close throughout however as MSU's big men struggled, but Coen Carr earned his first career double-double with 20 points and 10 rebounds while Trey Fort added 12 points. Jeremy Fears set the MSU record for assists in an NCAA tournament game with 16 as the Spartans won 77–69. Michigan State continued to shoot the ball well from three, making 11 of 26 attempts and shot 47% overall from the field. The win moved MSU to the Sweet Sixteen for third time in four years and marked the 17th trip under Tom Izzo.

==== UConn ====
The Spartans faced No. 2 seed UConn on March 27 in Washington, D.C. Michigan State started exceptionally slow, falling behind 25–6 10 minutes into the game. However, despite their poor play, the Spartans were able to narrow the lead to eight at the half and actually took the lead, 45–44, with 10 minutes left in the game. However, it was not enough as MSU lost 67–63. MSU made only four of 16 three-pointers in the game, but had four players in double figures in scoring. Carson Cooper, playing his last game as a Spartan, scored 14 while Coen Carr and Jeremy Fears scored 13 each. Jaxon Kohler, also playing his last game as a Spartan, added 12 points and eight rebounds in the loss. The loss ended the season with MSU 27–8 overall.

== Roster ==
On June 13, 2025, the team announced that senior walk-on Nick Sanders, son of football great Barry Sanders, was given a scholarship.

2025–26 Michigan State Spartans men's basketball team
Players
Coaches

Pos.	#	Name	Height	Weight	Year	Previous school	Hometown
F	55	Coen Carr (C)	6 ft 6 in (1.98 m)	225 lb (102 kg)	Jr	Legacy Early College	Greenville, SC
C	15	Carson Cooper (C)	6 ft 11 in (2.11 m)	245 lb (111 kg)	Sr	IMG Academy	Jackson, MI
G	1	Jeremy Fears Jr. (C)	6 ft 2 in (1.88 m)	190 lb (86 kg)	RS So	Joliet West High School	Joliet, IL
G	9	Trey Fort	6 ft 4 in (1.93 m)	200 lb (91 kg)	Sr	Samford; Mississippi State; DME Academy	Florence, MS
F	8	Kaleb Glenn (injured)	6 ft 7 in (2.01 m)	220 lb (100 kg)	Jr	Florida Atlantic; Louisville; La Lumiere School	La Porte, IN
F	0	Jaxon Kohler (C)	6 ft 9 in (2.06 m)	245 lb (111 kg)	Sr	Southern California Academy	American Fork, UT
F	35	Jesse McCulloch	6 ft 10 in (2.08 m)	240 lb (109 kg)	RS Fr	Lutheran High School East	Cleveland, OH
G	20	Nick Sanders	5 ft 10 in (1.78 m)	185 lb (84 kg)	Sr	Detroit Country Day School	Franklin, MI
G	6	Jordan Scott	6 ft 7 in (2.01 m)	190 lb (86 kg)	Fr	South Lakes High School	Reston, VA
F	2	Kur Teng	6 ft 4 in (1.93 m)	190 lb (86 kg)	So	Bradford Christian Academy	Manchester, NH
G	99	Divine Ugochukwu (injured)	6 ft 3 in (1.91 m)	190 lb (86 kg)	So	Miami; Clements High School	Sugar Land, TX
F	40	Brennan Walton (W)	6 ft 7 in (2.01 m)	220 lb (100 kg)	So	Okemos High School	Okemos, MI
F	43	Colin Walton (W)	6 ft 7 in (2.01 m)	220 lb (100 kg)	So	Okemos High School	Okemos, MI
F	3	Cam Ward	6 ft 8 in (2.03 m)	225 lb (102 kg)	Fr	Largo High School	Upper Marlboro, MD
G	10	Denham Wojcik	6 ft 2 in (1.88 m)	190 lb (86 kg)	GS	Harvard; Porter-Gaud School	Charleston, SC

Head coach

- Tom Izzo (Northern Michigan)

Assistant coach(es)

- Doug Wojcik (Navy)
- Thomas Kelley (Michigan State)
- Saddi Washington (Western Michigan)
- Jon Borovich (Central Michigan)
- Austin Thornton (Michigan State)

Legend

- (C) Team captain
- (S) Suspended
- (I) Ineligible
- (W) Walk-on
- Injured
- Current redshirt

Roster

== Schedule and results ==
On July 24, 2025, the school announced that they would play an exhibition game against UConn. On August 27, it was announced that MSU would play Arkansas in East Lansing on November 8. MSU's full schedule was announced on September 18. The Spartans once again participated in the Champions Classic, and for the first time participated in the Fort Myers Tip-Off, winning the 2025 tournament.

Date time, TV	Rank^{#}	Opponent^{#}	Result	Record	High points	High rebounds	High assists	Site (attendance) city, state
Exhibition
October 23, 2025*; 7:00 p.m., B1G+	No. 22	Bowling Green	W 75–66	–	17 – Carr	10 – Kohler	9 – Fears Jr.	Breslin Center (14,797); East Lansing, MI
October 28, 2025*; 7:30 p.m., WFSB/UConn+	No. 22	at No. 4 UConn	L 69–76	–	14 – Fears Jr.	12 – Kohler	6 – Fears Jr.	PeoplesBank Arena (15,495); Hartford, CT
Regular season
November 3, 2025*; 7:00 p.m., B1G+	No. 22	Colgate	W 80–69	1–0	16 – Kohler	15 – Kohler	10 – Fears Jr.	Breslin Center (14,797); East Lansing, MI
November 8, 2025*; 7:00 p.m., FOX	No. 22	No. 14 Arkansas	W 69–66	2–0	18 – Ward	10 – Ward	9 – Fears Jr.	Breslin Center (14,797); East Lansing, MI
November 13, 2025*; 6:30 p.m., BTN	No. 17	San Jose State	W 79–60	3–0	17 – Tied	18 – Kohler	9 – Fears Jr.	Breslin Center (14,797); East Lansing, MI
November 18, 2025*; 6:30 p.m., ESPN	No. 17	vs. No. 12 Kentucky; Champions Classic	W 83–66	4–0	20 – Kohler	6 – Tied	13 – Fears Jr.	Madison Square Garden (19,327); New York, NY
November 21, 2025*; 6:30 p.m., BTN	No. 17	Detroit Mercy	W 84–56	5–0	18 – Fears Jr.	8 – Ward	11 – Fears Jr.	Breslin Center (14,797); East Lansing, MI
November 25, 2025*; 1:00 p.m., FS2/BTN	No. 11	vs. East Carolina; Fort Myers Tip-Off Beach Division	W 89–56	6–0	16 – Tied	8 – Tied	9 – Fears Jr.	Suncoast Credit Union Arena (3,500); Fort Myers, FL
November 27, 2025*; 4:30 p.m., FOX	No. 11	vs. No. 16 North Carolina; Fort Myers Tip-Off Beach Division	W 74–58	7–0	19 – Fears Jr.	11 – Kohler	7 – Fears Jr.	Suncoast Credit Union Arena (3,500); Fort Myers, FL
December 2, 2025; 7:00 p.m., Peacock	No. 7	Iowa	W 71–52	8–0 (1–0)	15 – Carr	11 – Kohler	6 – Fears Jr.	Breslin Center (14,797); East Lansing, MI
December 6, 2025*; 12:00 p.m., FOX	No. 7	No. 4 Duke	L 60–66	8–1	16 – Cooper	16 – Cooper	13 – Fears Jr.	Breslin Center (14,797); East Lansing, MI
December 13, 2025; 12:00 p.m, BTN	No. 9	at Penn State	W 76–72	9–1 (2–0)	23 – Ugochukwu	12 – Kohler	9 – Fears Jr.	Bryce Jordan Center (7,091); State College, PA
December 16, 2025*; 6:30 p.m., Peacock	No. 9	Toledo	W 92–69	10–1	16 – Kohler	13 – Kohler	8 – Fears Jr.	Breslin Center (14,797); East Lansing, MI
December 20, 2025*; 12:00 p.m., BTN	No. 9	vs. Oakland	W 79–70	11–1	22 – Carr	13 – Kohler	5 – Tied	Little Caesars Arena (15,789); Detroit, MI
December 29, 2025*; 7:00 p.m., FS1	No. 9	Cornell	W 114–97	12–1	21 – Fears Jr.	10 – Kohler	11 – Fears Jr.	Breslin Center (14,797); East Lansing, MI
January 2, 2026; 9:00 p.m., Peacock	No. 9	at No. 13 Nebraska	L 56–58	12–2 (2–1)	19 – Kohler	13 – Cooper	7 – Fears Jr.	Pinnacle Bank Arena (14,841); Lincoln, NE
January 5, 2026; 8:30 p.m., FS1	No. 12	USC	W 80–51	13–2 (3–1)	18 – Carr	8 – Kohler	7 – Fears Jr.	Breslin Center (14,797); East Lansing, MI
January 8, 2026; 6:30 p.m., BTN	No. 12	Northwestern	W 76–66	14–2 (4–1)	18 – Cooper	9 – Cooper	5 – Tied	Breslin Center (14,797); East Lansing, MI
January 13, 2026; 8:00 p.m., Peacock	No. 12	Indiana	W 81–60	15–2 (5–1)	23 – Fears Jr.	10 – Kohler	10 – Fears Jr.	Breslin Center (14,797); East Lansing, MI
January 17, 2026; 6:00 p.m., BTN	No. 12	at Washington	W 80–63	16–2 (6–1)	19 – Fears Jr.	7 – Cooper	5 – Fears Jr.	Alaska Airlines Arena (7,882); Seattle, WA
January 20, 2026; 9:00 p.m., FS1	No. 10	at Oregon	W 68–52	17–2 (7–1)	19 – Cooper	8 – Carr	5 – Fears Jr.	Matthew Knight Arena (6,634); Eugene, OR
January 24, 2026; 12:00 p.m., CBS	No. 10	Maryland	W 91–48	18–2 (8–1)	17 – Fears Jr.	8 – Tied	17 – Fears Jr.	Breslin Center (14,797); East Lansing, MI
January 27, 2026; 6:30 p.m., FS1	No. 7	at Rutgers	W 88–79 ^{OT}	19–2 (9–1)	29 – Fears Jr.	14 – Cooper	9 – Fears Jr.	Jersey Mike's Arena (8,000); Piscataway, NJ
January 30, 2026; 8:00 p.m., FOX	No. 7	No. 3 Michigan; Rivalry	L 71–83	19–3 (9–2)	31 – Fears Jr.	7 – Carr	7 – Fears Jr.	Breslin Center (14,797); East Lansing, MI
February 4, 2026; 7:00 p.m., BTN	No. 10	at Minnesota	L 73–76	19–4 (9–3)	18 – Carr	9 – Kohler	11 – Fears Jr.	Williams Arena (8,994); Minneapolis, MN
February 7, 2026; 8:00 p.m., FOX	No. 10	No. 5 Illinois	W 85–82 ^{OT}	20–4 (10–3)	26 – Fears Jr.	16 – Kohler	15 – Fears Jr.	Breslin Center (14,797); East Lansing, MI
February 13, 2026; 8:00 p.m., FOX	No. 10	at Wisconsin	L 71–92	20–5 (10–4)	19 – Carr	8 – Cooper	12 – Fears Jr.	Kohl Center (16,838); Madison, WI
February 17, 2026; 8:30 p.m., Peacock	No. 15	UCLA	W 82–59	21–5 (11–4)	16 – Tied	10 – Kohler	10 – Fears Jr.	Breslin Center (14,797); East Lansing, MI
February 22, 2026; 1:00 p.m., CBS	No. 15	Ohio State	W 66–60	22–5 (12–4)	20 – Cooper	11 – Cooper	8 – Fears Jr.	Breslin Center (14,797); East Lansing, MI
February 26, 2026; 8:00 p.m., Peacock	No. 13	at No. 8 Purdue	W 76–74	23–5 (13–4)	15 – Cooper	6 – Cooper	6 – Fears Jr.	Mackey Arena (14,876); West Lafayette, IN
March 1, 2026; 3:45 p.m., CBS	No. 13	at Indiana	W 77–64	24–5 (14–4)	21 – Tied	13 – Kohler	9 – Fears Jr.	Assembly Hall (17,222); Bloomington, IN
March 5, 2026; 8:00 p.m., FS1	No. 8	Rutgers	W 91–87	25–5 (15–4)	21 – Tied	9 – Ward	8 – Fears Jr.	Breslin Center (14,797); East Lansing, MI
March 8, 2026; 4:30 p.m., CBS	No. 8	at No. 3 Michigan; Rivalry	L 80–90	25–6 (15–5)	23 – Kohler	8 – Kohler	9 – Fears Jr.	Crisler Center (12,707); Ann Arbor, MI
Big Ten tournament
March 13, 2026; 9:00 p.m., BTN	(3) No. 8	vs. (6) UCLA; Quarterfinal	L 84–88	25–7	21 – Fears Jr.	8 – Carr	13 – Fears Jr.	United Center (18,238); Chicago, IL
NCAA tournament
March 19, 2026; 4:05 p.m., TNT	(3 E) No. 11	vs. (14 E) North Dakota State; First round	W 92–67	26–7	20 – Cooper	10 – Cooper	11 – Fears Jr.	KeyBank Center (17,182); Buffalo, NY
March 21, 2026*; 2:45 p.m., CBS	(3 E) No. 11	vs. (6 E) No. 23 Louisville; Second round	W 77–69	27–7	21 – Carr	10 – Carr	16 – Fears Jr.	KeyBank Center (17,499); Buffalo, NY
March 27, 2026*; 9:45 p.m., CBS	(3 E) No. 11	vs. (2 E) No. 7 UConn; Sweet Sixteen	L 63–67	27–8	14 – Cooper	8 – Kohler	7 – Fears Jr.	Capital One Arena (19,445); Washington, D.C.
*Non-conference game. ^{#}Rankings from AP poll. (#) Tournament seedings in parentheses. E=East. All times are in Eastern Time.

== Player statistics ==
Individual player statistics (final)
			Minutes		Scoring		Total FGs			3-point FGs			Free-Throws			Rebounds							
Player	GP	GS	Tot	Avg	Pts	Avg	FG	FGA	Pct	3FG	3FA	Pct	FT	FTA	Pct	Off	Def	Tot	Avg	A	Stl	Blk	TO
Carr, Coen	35	35	1024	29.3	421	12.0	155	299	.518	21	76	.276	90	143	.629	54	135	189	5.4	43	16	28	48
Cooper, Carson	35	35	934	26.7	387	11.1	135	231	.584	2	5	.400	115	146	.788	67	181	248	7.1	51	21	34	54
Fears Jr., Jeremy	35	35	1135	32.4	533	15.2	157	364	.431	35	109	.321	184	208	.885	15	69	84	24	328	45	1	85
Fort, Trey	33	6	338	10.2	137	4.2	46	131	.351	29	84	.345	16	18	.889	6	36	42	1.3	20	8	7	19
Kohler, Jaxon	35	35	970	27.7	439	12.5	164	328	.500	58	149	.389	53	61	.869	101	211	312	8.9	45	21	23	48
McCulloch, Jesse	28	0	206	7.4	68	2.4	23	48	.479	9	18	.500	13	14	.929	15	21	36	1.3	6	3	13	9
Sanders, Nick	14	0	22	1.6	6	0.4	2	6	.333	2	4	.500	0	0		0	1	1	0.1	2	0	0	0
Scott, Jordan	35	13	729	20.8	204	5.8	67	163	.411	37	100	.370	33	47	.702	47	61	108	3.1	41	26	18	32
Teng, Kur	35	4	612	17.5	255	7.3	91	240	.379	56	147	.381	17	21	.810	19	51	70	2.0	36	10	2	27
Ugochukwu, Divine	22	12	354	16.1	113	5.1	42	83	.506	19	43	.442	10	18	.556	5	29	34	1.5	34	9	3	15
Walton, Brennan	12	0	16	1.3	5	0.4	2	4	.500	1	2	.500	0	0		1	4	5	0.4	0	0	0	1
Walton, Colin	12	0	15	1.3	3	0.3	1	1	1.000	1	1	1.000	0	0		1	2	3	0.3	0	0	0	0
Ward, Cam	34	0	521	15.3	172	5.1	73	124	.589	0	2	.000	26	51	.510	46	95	143	4.2	10	12	16	29
Wojcik, Denham	31	0	173	5.6	15	0.5	6	21	..286	0	4	.000	3	6	.500	1	7	8	0.3	36	8	0	14
Total	35		7050		2758	78.8	964	2043	.472	270	744	.363	560	733	.764	435	953	1388	39.7	652	179	145	405
Opponents	35		7050		2392	68.3	821	1990	.413	303	919	.330	447	601	.744	275	175	990	28.3	470	228	106	351

Legend
GP	Games played	GS	Games started	Avg	Average per game
FG	Field-goals made	FGA	Field-goal attempts	Off	Offensive rebounds
Def	Defensive rebounds	A	Assists	TO	Turnovers
Blk	Blocks	Stl	Steals

ource

== Rankings ==
Ranking movements Legend: ██ Increase in ranking ██ Decrease in ranking
	Week																				
Poll	Pre	1	2	3	4	5	6	7	8	9	10	11	12	13	14	15	16	17	18	19	Final
AP	22	17	17	11	7	9	9	9	9	12	12	10	7	10	10	15	13	8	8	11	11
Coaches	21	17	18	12	8	9	9	9	9	13	12	10	8	10	10	15	13	8	8	11	11

== Awards and honors ==
=== In-season awards ===
Name	Award	Date
Jeremy Fears Jr.	Big Ten Player of the Week	January 26, 2026
Jeremy Fears Jr.	Big Ten Player of the Week	February 2, 2026

=== Postseason awards ===
==== Jeremy Fears Jr. ====
- AP All-American second team
- Sporting News All-American third team
- NABC All-American third team
- USBWA All-American third team
- All-Big Ten first team

==== Jaxon Kohler ====
- All-Big Ten Honorable Mention
