= 2025–26 UCLA Bruins men's basketball team =

American college basketball season

2025–26 UCLA Bruins men's basketball

NCAA tournament, Second round
- Conference: Big Ten Conference
- Record: 24–12 (13–7 Big Ten)
- Head coach: Mick Cronin (7th season)
- Associate head coach: Darren Savino (7th season)
- Assistant coaches: Rod Palmer (7th season); Nate Georgeton (3rd season); Nemanja Jovanovic (3rd season); David Singleton (1st season)
- Home arena: Pauley Pavilion (Capacity: 13,819)

2025–26 Big Ten Conference men's basketball standings
	Conf.				Overall
Team	W		L	PCT	W		L	PCT
No. 1 Michigan	19	–	1	.950	37	–	3	.925
No. 14 Nebraska	15	–	5	.750	28	–	7	.800
No. 5 Illinois	15	–	5	.750	28	–	9	.757
No. 11 Michigan State	15	–	5	.750	27	–	8	.771
No. 25 Wisconsin	14	–	6	.700	24	–	11	.686
No. 6 Purdue †	13	–	7	.650	30	–	9	.769
UCLA	13	–	7	.650	24	–	12	.667
Ohio State	12	–	8	.600	21	–	13	.618
No. 15 Iowa	10	–	10	.500	24	–	13	.649
Indiana	9	–	11	.450	18	–	14	.563
Minnesota	8	–	12	.400	15	–	18	.455
USC	7	–	13	.350	18	–	14	.563
Washington	7	–	13	.350	16	–	17	.485
Rutgers	6	–	14	.300	14	–	20	.412
Northwestern	5	–	15	.250	15	–	19	.441
Oregon	5	–	15	.250	12	–	20	.375
Maryland	4	–	16	.200	12	–	21	.364
Penn State	3	–	17	.150	12	–	20	.375
† 2026 Big Ten tournament winner Rankings from AP poll

The 2025–26 UCLA Bruins men's basketball team represented the University of California, Los Angeles during the 2025–26 NCAA Division I men's basketball season. The Bruins, led by seventh-year head coach Mick Cronin, played their home games at Pauley Pavilion as members of the Big Ten Conference. The Bruins finished the season 24–12, 13–7 in Big Ten play to finish a tie for seventh place. As the No. 6 seed in the Big Ten tournament, they defeated Rutgers and Michigan State before losing to Purdue in the semifinal. They received an at-large bid to the NCAA tournament as the No. 7 seed in the East region. There they defeated UCF before losing to UConn in the second round.

The Bruins finished with a 17–1 record at home, including wins over top-10 ranked Purdue, Illinois and Nebraska. In UCLA's opener in the Big Ten tournament, Donovan Dent had 12 points, 10 rebounds, and 12 assists in a 72–59 win over Rutgers. It was the first triple-double in the tournament's history. In the following game, the sixth-seeded Bruins won 88–84 in the quarterfinal over No. 8–ranked and third-seeded Michigan State, their first non-home win of the season against a ranked opponent.

== Previous season ==
The Bruins finished the 2024–25 season 23–11, 13–7 in Big Ten play to finish in a three-way tie for fourth place. As the No. 4 seed in the Big Ten tournament, they lost to Wisconsin in the quarterfinal. They received an at-large bid to the NCAA tournament as the No. 7 seed in the Midwest region. They defeated Utah State in the first round before losing to Tennessee in the second round.

== Offseason ==
=== Departures ===
UCLA Departures
Name	Num	Pos.	Height	Weight	Year	Hometown	Reason for Departure
Kobe Johnson	0	G	6'6"	200	Senior	Milwaukee, WI	Graduated
Dylan Andrews	2	G	6'2"	180	Junior	West Covina, CA	Transferred to Boise State
Dominick Harris	8	G	6'3"	190	Senior	Murrieta, CA	Graduated
Lazar Stefanović	10	G	6'7"	190	Senior	Belgrade, Serbia	Graduated
Sebastian Mack	12	G	6'3"	200	Sophomore	Chicago, IL	Transferred to Missouri
Aday Mara	15	C	7'3"	240	Sophomore	Zaragoza, Spain	Transferred to Michigan
Devin Williams	22	F	6'10"	200	Sophomore	Riverside, CA	Transferred to Florida Atlantic
William Kyle III	24	F	6'9"	230	Junior	Bellevue, NE	Transferred to Syracuse

Incoming transfers
Name	Num	Pos.	Height	Weight	Year	Hometown	Previous School
Xavier Booker	1	F/C	6'11"	220	Junior	Indianapolis, IN	Michigan State
Donovan Dent	2	G	6'2"	185	Senior	Riverside	New Mexico
Jamar Brown	4	G	6'5"	200	5th	Chandler, AZ	UMKC
Anthony Peoples Jr.	23	F/C	6'9"	230	Senior	Corona, CA	NCCU
Steven Jamerson II	24	F/C	6'10"	230	Senior	Los Angeles, CA	San Diego

=== 2025 recruiting class ===
College recruiting information
Name	Hometown	School	Height	Weight	Commit date
Markell Alston; G	Queensbridge, NY	Christ the King Regional High School	6 ft 1 in (1.85 m)	185 lb (84 kg)	Jun 16, 2025
Markell Alston; G	Recruit ratings: No ratings found				
Overall recruit ranking:
Note: In many cases, Scout, Rivals, 247Sports, On3, and ESPN may conflict in their listings of height and weight.; In these cases, the average was taken. ESPN grades are on a 100-point scale.; Sources: "UCLA ESPN Recruiting". ESPN.; "2025 Team Ranking". Rivals.; "2025–26 UCLA Bruins men's basketball team". 247Sports.; "2025–26 UCLA Bruins men's basketball team". On3.

== Roster ==
2025–26 UCLA Bruins men's basketball team
Players
Coaches

Pos.	#	Name	Height	Weight	Year	Previous school	Hometown
G	0	Trent Perry	6 ft 4 in (1.93 m)	180 lb (82 kg)	So	Harvard-Westlake	West Covina, CA
F/C	1	Xavier Booker	6 ft 11 in (2.11 m)	245 lb (111 kg)	Jr	Michigan State	Indianapolis, IN
G	2	Donovan Dent	6 ft 2 in (1.88 m)	185 lb (84 kg)	Sr	New Mexico	Riverside, CA
F	3	Eric Dailey Jr.	6 ft 8 in (2.03 m)	230 lb (104 kg)	Jr	Oklahoma State	Palmetto, FL
G	4	Jamar Brown	6 ft 5 in (1.96 m)	200 lb (91 kg)	Sr	UMKC	Chandler, AZ
G/F	5	Brandon Williams	6 ft 7 in (2.01 m)	220 lb (100 kg)	RS So	Christ the King HS	Queens, NY
G	7	Christian Horry (W)	6 ft 2 in (1.88 m)	175 lb (79 kg)	RS Fr	Harvard-Westlake	La Cañada, CA
G	8	Eric Freeny	6 ft 4 in (1.93 m)	200 lb (91 kg)	RS Fr	Centennial HS	Corona, CA
G	10	Markell Alston (redshirt)	6 ft 1 in (1.85 m)	185 lb (84 kg)	Fr	Christ the King HS	Queensbridge, NY
F	21	Evan Manjikian (W)	6 ft 8 in (2.03 m)	235 lb (107 kg)	RS Jr	Sierra Canyon	Glendale, CA
F/C	23	Anthony Peoples Jr.	6 ft 9 in (2.06 m)	230 lb (104 kg)	Sr	Centennial HS	Corona, CA
F/C	24	Steven Jamerson II	6 ft 10 in (2.08 m)	230 lb (104 kg)	Sr	Crespi HS	Los Angeles, CA
G	30	Jack Seidler (W)	6 ft 4 in (1.93 m)	200 lb (91 kg)	RS Jr	Marlboro HS	Marlboro, NJ
F	34	Tyler Bilodeau	6 ft 9 in (2.06 m)	230 lb (104 kg)	Sr	Oregon State	Kennewick, WA
G	55	Skyy Clark	6 ft 3 in (1.91 m)	205 lb (93 kg)	Sr	Louisville	Los Angeles, CA

Head coach

- Mick Cronin (Cincinnati)

Assistant coach(es)

- Darren Savino (New Jersey City)
- Rod Palmer (UC Irvine)
- Nate Georgeton (Cincinnati)
- Nemanja Jovanovic (Belgrade)
- David Singleton (UCLA)

Legend

- (C) Team captain
- (S) Suspended
- (I) Ineligible
- (W) Walk-on
- Injured
- Current redshirt

Roster

== Schedule and results ==
Date time, TV	Rank^{#}	Opponent^{#}	Result	Record	High points	High rebounds	High assists	Site (attendance) city, state
Exhibition
October 17, 2025*; 7:00 p.m.	No. 12	at San Diego State	W 67–60		18 – Dent	5 – Tied	3 – Dent	Viejas Arena (9,500); San Diego, CA
October 28, 2025*; 7:00 p.m., B1G+	No. 12	UC Irvine	W 94–64		19 – Bilodeau	10 – Brown	8 – Dent	Pauley Pavilion (4,016); Los Angeles, CA
Regular season
November 3, 2025*; 7:30 p.m., BTN	No. 12	Eastern Washington	W 80–74	1–0	21 – Dent	7 – Booker	9 – Dent	Pauley Pavilion (3,615); Los Angeles, CA
November 7, 2025*; 7:30 p.m., BTN	No. 12	Pepperdine	W 74–63	2–0	15 – Booker	5 – Tied	4 – Dent	Pauley Pavilion (9,103); Los Angeles, CA
November 10, 2025*; 7:00 p.m., B1G+	No. 15	West Georgia	W 83–62	3–0	21 – Bilodeau	6 – Booker	9 – Perry	Pauley Pavilion (4,133); Los Angeles, CA
November 14, 2025*; 7:00 p.m., Peacock	No. 15	vs. No. 5 Arizona; Rivalry/Hall of Fame Series Los Angeles	L 65–69	3–1	19 – Bilodeau	7 – Booker	8 – Dent	Intuit Dome (7,554); Inglewood, CA
November 18, 2025*; 7:30 p.m., BTN	No. 19	Sacramento State; Empire Classic	W 79–48	4–1	15 – Dailey Jr.	10 – Dailey Jr.	7 – Dent	Pauley Pavilion (4,735); Los Angeles, CA
November 21, 2025*; 7:30 p.m., BTN	No. 19	Presbyterian; Empire Classic	W 86–46	5–1	22 – Clark	7 – Tied	5 – Dent	Pauley Pavilion (4,142); Los Angeles, CA
November 25, 2025*; 7:00 p.m., ESPN	No. 18	vs. California; Empire Classic	L 72–80	5–2	17 – Dailey Jr.	7 – Dailey Jr.	7 – Dent	Chase Center (7,293); San Francisco, CA
December 3, 2025; 8:00 p.m., BTN		at Washington	W 82–80	6–2 (1–0)	25 – Clark	6 – Brown	8 – Dent	Alaska Airlines Arena (6,700); Seattle, WA
December 6, 2025; 3:00 p.m., Peacock		Oregon	W 74–63	7–2 (2–0)	18 – Dailey Jr.	8 – Tied	4 – Clark	Pauley Pavilion (7,022); Los Angeles, CA
December 13, 2025*; 8:30 p.m., ESPN	No. 25	vs. No. 8 Gonzaga; Seattle Hoops Showdown	L 72–82	7–3	24 – Bilodeau	5 – 3 Tied	10 – Dent	Climate Pledge Arena (13,148); Seattle, WA
December 17, 2025*; 7:30 p.m., FS1		Arizona State	W 99–77	8–3	20 – Dent	6 – Dailey Jr.	5 – Clark	Pauley Pavilion (5,553); Los Angeles, CA
December 19, 2025*; 7:00 p.m., BTN		Cal Poly	W 108–87	9–3	30 – Clark	8 – Bilodeau	11 – Dent	Pauley Pavilion (4,123); Los Angeles, CA
December 23, 2025*; 1:00 p.m., BTN		UC Riverside	W 97–65	10–3	34 – Bilodeau	9 – Dailey Jr.	7 – Perry	Pauley Pavilion (4,475); Los Angeles, CA
January 3, 2026; 3:00 p.m., Peacock		at No. 25 Iowa	L 61–74	10–4 (2–1)	25 – Dent	4 – Tied	5 – Dent	Carver–Hawkeye Arena (12,657); Iowa City, IA
January 6, 2026; 6:00 p.m., Peacock		at Wisconsin	L 72–80	10–5 (2–2)	18 – Dailey Jr.	9 – Bilodeau	7 – Dent	Kohl Center (13,644); Madison, WI
January 10, 2026; 5:00 p.m., FOX		Maryland	W 67–55	11–5 (3–2)	16 – Perry	9 – Dailey Jr.	7 – Dent	Pauley Pavilion (6,879); Los Angeles, CA
January 14, 2026; 5:30 p.m., FS1		at Penn State	W 71–60	12–5 (4–2)	30 – Perry	9 – Bilodeau	5 – Dent	Bryce Jordan Center (5,836); University Park, PA
January 17, 2026; 10:00 a.m., CBS		at Ohio State	L 74–86	12–6 (4–3)	30 – Bilodeau	8 – Bilodeau	7 – Dent	Value City Arena (12,937); Columbus, OH
January 20, 2026; 7:00 p.m., Peacock		No. 4 Purdue; Coach Wooden Legacy Night	W 69–67	13–6 (5–3)	23 – Dent	7 – Dailey Jr.	13 – Dent	Pauley Pavilion (10,235); Los Angeles, CA
January 24, 2026; 3:00 p.m., FS1		Northwestern	W 71–64	14–6 (6–3)	18 – Tied	8 – Tied	5 – Dent	Pauley Pavilion (7,444); Los Angeles, CA
January 28, 2026; 8:00 p.m., BTN		at Oregon	W 73–57	15–6 (7–3)	18 – Bilodeau	11 – Dailey Jr.	4 – Dent	Matthew Knight Arena (5,721); Eugene, OR
January 31, 2026; 2:00 p.m., Peacock		Indiana	L 97–98 ^{2OT}	15–7 (7–4)	25 – Perry	11 – Bilodeau	11 – Dent	Pauley Pavilion (10,086); Los Angeles, CA
February 3, 2026; 6:30 p.m., BTN		Rutgers	W 98–66	16–7 (8–4)	24 – Booker	7 – Tied	11 – Dent	Pauley Pavilion (5,307); Los Angeles, CA
February 7, 2026; 7:00 p.m., FS1		Washington	W 77–73	17–7 (9–4)	23 – Perry	7 – Booker	10 – Dent	Pauley Pavilion (7,080); Los Angeles, CA
February 14, 2026; 9:45 a.m., CBS		at No. 2 Michigan	L 56–86	17–8 (9–5)	14 – Perry	6 – Bilodeau	4 – Dent	Crisler Center (12,707); Ann Arbor, MI
February 17, 2026; 5:30 p.m., Peacock		at No. 15 Michigan State	L 59–82	17–9 (9–6)	22 – Bilodeau	6 – Bilodeau	4 – Dent	Breslin Center (14,797); East Lansing, MI
February 21, 2026; 5:00 p.m., FOX		No. 10 Illinois	W 95–94 ^{OT}	18–9 (10–6)	20 – Dailey Jr.	6 – Dailey Jr.	15 – Dent	Pauley Pavilion (10,036); Los Angeles, CA
February 24, 2026; 8:00 p.m., FS1		USC; Rivalry	W 81–62	19–9 (11–6)	30 – Dent	9 – Bilodeau	7 – Dent	Pauley Pavilion (13,659); Los Angeles, CA
February 28, 2026; 11:00 a.m., FS1		at Minnesota	L 73–78	19–10 (11–7)	32 – Bilodeau	8 – Bilodeau	15 – Dent	Williams Arena (9,811); Minneapolis, MN
March 3, 2026; 8:00 p.m., FS1		No. 9 Nebraska	W 72–52	20–10 (12–7)	20 – Perry	8 – Dailey Jr.	8 – Dent	Pauley Pavilion (9,027); Los Angeles, CA
March 7, 2026; 6:00 p.m., FS1		at USC; Rivalry	W 89–68	21–10 (13–7)	25 – Dent	8 – Tied	7 – Dent	Galen Center (8,441); Los Angeles, CA
Big Ten tournament
March 12, 2026; 6:00 p.m., BTN	(6)	vs. (14) Rutgers; Third round	W 72–59	22–10	21 – Bilodeau	10 – Dent	12 – Dent	United Center (16,861); Chicago, IL
March 13, 2026; 6:00 p.m., BTN	(6)	vs. (3) No. 8 Michigan State; Quarterfinal	W 88–84	23–10	23 – Dent	10 – Dailey Jr.	12 – Dent	United Center (18,238); Chicago, IL
March 14, 2026; 12:30 p.m., CBS	(6)	vs. (7) No. 18 Purdue; Semifinal	L 66–73	23–11	15 – Perry	10 – Dailey Jr.	9 – Perry	United Center (17,923); Chicago, IL
NCAA Tournament
March 20, 2026; 4:25 p.m., TBS	(7 E)	vs. (10 E) UCF; First round	W 75–71	24–11	20 – Dailey Jr.	8 – Booker	5 – Dent	Xfinity Mobile Arena (19,636); Philadelphia, PA
March 22, 2026; 5:45 p.m., TNT	(7 E)	vs. (2 E) No. 7 UConn; Second round	L 57–73	24–12	13 – Booker	5 – Booker	9 – Dent	Xfinity Mobile Arena (19,279); Philadelphia, PA
*Non-conference game. ^{#}Rankings from AP poll. (#) Tournament seedings in parentheses. E=East. All times are in Pacific Time.

== Rankings ==
Ranking movements Legend: ██ Increase in ranking ██ Decrease in ranking — = Not ranked RV = Received votes
	Week																				
Poll	Pre	1	2	3	4	5	6	7	8	9	10	11	12	13	14	15	16	17	18	19	Final
AP	12	15	19	18	RV	25	RV	RV	RV*	RV	—	—	—	—	—	—	—	—	RV	RV	RV
Coaches	12	15	20	19	RV	RV	RV	RV	RV	—	—	—	—	—	—	—	—	—	RV	RV	RV

*AP did not release a week 8 poll.

== Awards and honors ==
- December 22, 2025 – Skyy Clark was named Big Ten Co-Player of the Week
- March 12, 2026 – Donovan Dent scored a first triple-double in the history of the Big Ten tournament
- March 17, 2026 – Tyler Bilodeau and Donovan Dent were named to the NABC All-Pacific District first-team
