= 2023–24 Michigan State Spartans men's basketball team =

American college basketball season

2023–24 Michigan State Spartans men's basketball

NCAA tournament, Second Round
- Conference: Big Ten Conference
- Record: 20–15 (10–10 Big Ten)
- Head coach: Tom Izzo (29th season)
- Assistant coaches: Doug Wojcik (5th overall season); Mark Montgomery (13th overall season); Thomas Kelley (2nd season)
- Home arena: Breslin Center

2023–24 Big Ten Conference men's basketball standings
| | Conf. | | | | Overall |
| Team | W | | L | PCT | W | | L | PCT |
|---|---|---|---|---|---|---|---|---|
| No. 2 Purdue | 17 | – | 3 | .850 | 34 | – | 5 | .872 |
| No. 6 Illinois † | 14 | – | 6 | .700 | 29 | – | 9 | .763 |
| Nebraska | 12 | – | 8 | .600 | 23 | – | 11 | .676 |
| Northwestern | 12 | – | 8 | .600 | 22 | – | 12 | .647 |
| Wisconsin | 11 | – | 9 | .550 | 22 | – | 14 | .611 |
| Indiana | 10 | – | 10 | .500 | 19 | – | 14 | .576 |
| Iowa | 10 | – | 10 | .500 | 19 | – | 15 | .559 |
| Michigan State | 10 | – | 10 | .500 | 20 | – | 15 | .571 |
| Minnesota | 9 | – | 11 | .450 | 19 | – | 15 | .559 |
| Ohio State | 9 | – | 11 | .450 | 22 | – | 14 | .611 |
| Penn State | 9 | – | 11 | .450 | 16 | – | 17 | .485 |
| Maryland | 7 | – | 13 | .350 | 16 | – | 17 | .485 |
| Rutgers | 7 | – | 13 | .350 | 15 | – | 17 | .469 |
| Michigan | 3 | – | 17 | .150 | 8 | – | 24 | .250 |
† 2024 Big Ten tournament winner Rankings from AP poll

The 2023–24 Michigan State Spartans men's basketball team represented Michigan State University in the 2023–24 NCAA Division I men's basketball season. The Spartans were led by 29th-year head coach Tom Izzo and played their home games at Breslin Center in East Lansing, Michigan as members of the Big Ten Conference. The Michigan State Spartans men's basketball team drew an average home attendance of 14,797 in 16 games in 2024–25.

With a win over Michigan on January 30, 2024, his 69th birthday, Tom Izzo earned his 700th career win, all at MSU. The Spartans finished the regular season 20–15, 10–10 in Big Ten play to finish in a three-way tie for sixth place. As the No. 8 seed in the Big Ten tournament, MSU defeated Minnesota in the second round before losing to top-seeded Purdue in the quarterfinals. The Spartans received an at-large bid to the NCAA Tournament as the No. 9 seed in the West region, extending Izzo's record-setting streak to 26 straight tournament appearances. They defeated Mississippi State in the first round before losing to No. 1-seeded North Carolina.

During the Christmas break, freshman guard Jeremy Fears Jr. was shot in his thigh in his hometown of Joliet, Illinois. He underwent three hours of surgery and was discharged from the hospital on Christmas Eve. As a result, he missed the rest of the season.

== Previous season ==
The Spartans finished the 2022–23 season 21–13, 11–8 in Big Ten play to finish in fourth place. They lost in the quarterfinals of the Big Ten tournament to Ohio State. They received an at-large bid to the NCAA tournament as the No. 7 seed in the East region. This marked the school's 25th straight selection to the NCAA tournament making it the third longest streak, second longest active streak, and the longest streak by a coach in men's basketball ever. The Spartans defeated USC and Marquette to advance to their first Sweet Sixteen since 2019. There they lost to Kansas State. The Spartans were led by Tyson Walker who averaged 14.8 points per game and Joey Hauser who averaged 14.3 points and 7.1 rebounds per game.

== Offseason ==
=== Coaching changes ===
On July 13, 2023, the school announced MSU alum Lorenzo Guess had been named the team's head of strength and conditioning, replacing Marshall Repp who left the team in July.

=== Departures ===
On March 24, 2023, forward Joey Hauser, who could have applied for a medical redshirt year, announced he would not return for another year to MSU. He received an invite to the NBA G League combine. On March 29, sophomore guard Pierre Brooks announced he was transferring to Butler.

Departures
| Name | No. | Pos. | Height | Weight | Year | Hometown | Notes |
|---|---|---|---|---|---|---|---|
| Joey Hauser | 10 | F | 6'9" | 230 | RS Sr | Stevens Point, WI | Graduated |
| Pierre Brooks | 1 | G | 6'6" | 225 | So | Detroit, MI | Transferred to Butler |

=== Returning players ===
On April 10, 2023, senior guard and leading scorer Tyson Walker announced he would return to the Spartans for a fifth year (third at MSU) pursuant to the extra year of eligibility granted by the NCAA due to the COVID-19 pandemic. The next day, senior forward Malik Hall announced he too would return for a fifth and final season with the Spartans.

On April 21, junior shooting guard Jaden Akins announced he was entering the NBA draft while maintaining his college eligibility. Junior point guard AJ Hoggard also submitted his name for the NBA draft, but made no announcement. Neither player was invited to the draft combine. On May 31, both players announced they had withdrawn their names from the NBA draft and would return to MSU.

=== Recruiting class ===
On January 6, 2022, top-35 prospect, four-star point guard Jeremy Fears Jr. announced he would attend Michigan State in 2023. On July 30, five-star forward Xavier Booker also announced he would play for the Spartans in 2023. On August 2, four-star forward Gehrig Normand announced he too would play for MSU in 2023. With these three commits, the MSU 2023 class was ranked the fourth best class in the country. On August 9, four-star forward Coen Carr also announced that he would play for the Spartans in 2023. His announcement moved MSU's recruiting class to the third in the country at the time. All four players signed letters of intent on November 9 making the class the nation's third best. In ESPN's final class rankings, MSU's class was ranked as the fourth best in the nation.

College recruiting
| Name | Hometown | School | Height | Weight | Commit date |
|---|---|---|---|---|---|
| Xavier Booker; PF | Indianapolis, IN | Cathedral High School | 6 ft 10 in (2.08 m) | 210 lb (95 kg) | Nov 9, 2022 |
| Xavier Booker; PF | Recruit ratings: Rivals: 247Sports: (94) | | | | |
| Coen Carr; SF | Greenville, SC | Legacy Early College | 6 ft 7 in (2.01 m) | 200 lb (91 kg) | Nov 9, 2022 |
| Coen Carr; SF | Recruit ratings: Rivals: 247Sports: (83) | | | | |
| Jeremy Fears Jr. PG | Joliet, IL | Joliet West High School | 6 ft 2 in (1.88 m) | 175 lb (79 kg) | Nov 9, 2022 |
| Jeremy Fears Jr. PG | Recruit ratings: Rivals: 247Sports: (89) | | | | |
| Gehrig Normand; SF | North Richland Hills, TX | Birdville High School | 6 ft 6 in (1.98 m) | 180 lb (82 kg) | Nov 9, 2022 |
| Gehrig Normand; SF | Recruit ratings: Rivals: 247Sports: (82) | | | | |
Overall recruit ranking:
Note: In many cases, Scout, Rivals, 247Sports, On3, and ESPN may conflict in their listings of height and weight.; In these cases, the average was taken. ESPN grades are on a 100-point scale.; Sources:

=== Early offseason rankings ===
Most early rankings for the 2023–24 season listed Michigan State as a preseason top-12 team. These included 247Sports (No. 12), CBS Sports (No. 11), ESPN (No. 3), Fox Sports (No. 8), Sports Illustrated (No. 10), The Athletic (No. 6), The Sporting News (No. 11), and USA Today (No. 7).

== Preseason ==
=== Preseason Big Ten polls ===
Michigan State was picked to finish in second place in the conference by an annual, unofficial preseason poll of basketball writers. In the same poll, Tyson Walker was named to the preseason first team while A. J. Hoggard was named to the second team. In an official conference preseason poll conducted by a panel of media members, Walker and Hoggard were each named to the preseason All-Big Ten team .

=== Preseason rankings ===
After not being ranked in the preseason AP poll the prior two seasons, MSU received one first place vote and began the season ranked No. 4 in the country. The Spartans were also ranked No. 4 in the Coaches poll. The Spartans were also ranked in the top five of most other preseason rankings including Blue Ribbon Yearbook (No. 5), ESPN (No. 4), FOX Sports (No. 4), and Lindy's Sports (No. 4).

=== Injuries ===
On October 18, 2023, the school announced that sophomore forward Jaxon Kohler underwent foot surgery and would miss the beginning of the season. He was expected to return before Christmas.

=== Scrimmage ===
The Spartans held a team scrimmage on October 21, to help bring in fans for the later Michigan State-Michigan football game.

=== Exhibition games ===
MSU played Division II Hillsdale in an exhibition at Breslin Center on October 25. The Spartans won easily as six players score nine or more points. A. J. Hoggard and freshman Jeremy Fears Jr. each had a game-high eight assists. Carson Cooper and Tyson Walker each scored 13 points in the 85–43 win.

On October 29, the Spartans played No. 9-ranked Tennessee in an exhibition game at Breslin Center. The Spartans fell behind 15–1, but battled back to keep the game close throughout. However, they trailed by five with 13 seconds left before an A. J. Hoggard three tied the game with less than five seconds left. A foul by Tre Holloman with 1.9 seconds gave the Volunteers two free throw attempts to win the game. Tennessee's Jordan Gainey made one of the two to give the Volunteers the 89–88 win. Tyson Walker led MSU with 22 points while Jaden Akins had 12 points and a team-high six assists.

== Regular season ==
=== Early non-conference games ===
==== James Madison ====
The Spartans opened the season at home against James Madison on November 6. Just like in their prior exhibition game, the Spartans started slowly, falling behind James Madison and trailing throughout the first half. The Spartans were able to narrow the lead to single digits by halftime and trailed 37–33. In the second half, MSU took the lead, but could not pull away as the teams exchanged the lead through the second half. With just under 1:30 left in regulation, the Spartans led by four, 68–64. The Dukes rallied to tie the game and Tyson Walker missed a jumper as time expired to send the game to overtime. Trailing by two with 39 seconds left, Walker made one of two free throws and the Dukes hit a three with 10 seconds left to push their lead to four. A Walker layup and a missed free throw by JMU left the lead at three with just over two seconds remaining. Walker had the ball knocked away before he could get off a shot as the Spartans fell 79–76. The loss marked the first Spartan home loss in November under Tom Izzo and the school's first home loss in November since 1986. Walker led all scorers with 35, but only freshman Coen Carr also scored in double figures for the Spartans. The Spartans were 1–20 from the three point line.

==== Southern Indiana ====
The Spartans next faced Southern Indiana on November 9 in East Lansing. The Spartans still continued to struggle shooting, again making only one three-pointer in the game. However, against a lesser foe, the Spartans cruised to an easy 74–51 win. MSU limited the Screaming Eagles to 14% from the field as USI only scored 14 points in the first half. Tyson Walker again led the Spartans in scoring, making six of seven shots and scoring 14 points. Three other Spartans (Jaden Akins, Malik Hall, and Mady Sissoko) also scored in double figures in the win. MSU shot much better from the free throw line as well, making 23 of 28. The win moved MSU to 1–1 on the season.

==== Duke ====
MSU next traveled to Chicago to face Duke in the Champions Classic on November 14. The Spartans held the game close in the first half, but trailed by 11 at the half. The Spartan struggles from three continued in the first half as MSU made only two of 13 three-pointers in the first half. In the second half, the Spartans made several runs, narrowing the lead to a three a few times, but could get no closer as they lost 74–65. The Spartans improved their three point shooting in the half, making four of six shots. Tyson Walker again led the Spartans with 22 points and Malik Hall added 18. A.J. Hoggard only had two points, but did notch eight assists in the loss. The game was decided at the free throw line as the Blue Devils outshot MSU with 30 free throw attempts to the Spartans 12. The loss dropped MSU to 1–2 on the season.

==== Butler ====
MSU returned home to face Butler as part of the Gavitt Tipoff Games on November 17. MSU shot the ball much better in the game, making 42% of their threes in the first half as they took a halftime lead of 12, 37–25. Tyson Walker again played well for the Spartans, scoring 21 points as MSU pulled away for an easy 74–54 win. The Spartans shot 47% from the floor including 35% from three in the win. Meanwhile, they held the Bulldogs to only 28% shooting. A. J. Hoggard scored 14 for MSU while Carson Cooper got the start over Maddy Sissoko and notched a career-high 11 rebounds. Malik Hall added 12 points as the Spartans moved to 2–2 on the season.

==== Alcorn State ====
Two days later, Alcorn State came to East Lansing. Tyson Walker did not play due to an illness; Tre Holloman got the start in his place and scored a career-high 17 points, including making all five three-pointers. The Spartans blew out the Braves 81–49. The Spartan defense again played well, limiting Alcorn State to only 16 points in the first half and holding them to 26% shooting from the field. MSU made a season-high 10 three-pointers and shot 40% from three in the win. Jaden Akins added 11 points while A. J. Hoggard and Coen Carr each scored 11 in the easy win.

==== Arizona ====
The Spartans traveled to Palm Springs, California to face No. 3 Arizona on Thanksgiving as part of the Acrisure Classic. The Wildcats took an early lead in the first half and led through the half, with MSU trailing by as many as 14. Arizona led by 10 at the half. In the second half, MSU came out with more aggression and narrowed the lead to single digits before taking the lead with 4:37 left. However, Arizona outscored MSU 11–4 in the final minutes to secure the 74–68 win. Tyson Walker led all scorers with 18 points while A. J. Hoggard scored 15 and Jaden Akins scored 12. MSU shot under 30% from three in the game as they dropped to 3–3 on the season.

==== Georgia Southern ====
MSU returned home to face Georgia Southern on November 28. Michigan State routed the winless Eagles 86–55. Four Spartans scored in double figures with Jaden Akins leading the way with 14. Tre Holloman, getting the start for A. J. Hoggard, notched 10 assists while Tyson Walker scored 13 in the rout. The Spartans held Georgia Southern to 11 points in the first half. The win moved MSU to 4–3 on the season.

=== Early conference games ===
==== Wisconsin ====
After a week off, MSU opened conference play against No. 23 Wisconsin. MSU, as had been the story for most of the season, started slow, trailing by double digits throughout the first half and was behind 11 at half time. The Spartans made a push in the second half and narrowed the Badger lead to three on several occasions, but could not keep it close for long. The Badgers won easily 70–57. Tyson Walker scored 22 for the Spartans while A. J. Hoggard added 14, but no other Spartan scored more than five in the loss. MSU dropped to 4–4 and 0–1 in conference play on the season.

==== Nebraska ====
The Spartans traveled to face Nebraska on December 10. The Spartans played well in the first half, but the Cornhuskers kept the game close throughout. After leading by three at the half, MSU was outscored 10–3 in the closing minutes and lost 77–70. Malik Hall scored 22 points and had seven rebounds while Tyson Walker scored 17. The Spartans' big men, Mady Sissoko and Carson Cooper combined for two points and three rebounds in 25 minutes. Hall played most of the game at the five position in the loss. The loss dropped MSU to 4–5 and 0–2 in conference on the season. The 4–5 start to the season tied the worst starts to a season under Tom Izzo with his first team in 1995–96 and the 2002–03 team.

=== Remaining non-conference games ===
==== Baylor ====
MSU next faced No. 6-ranked Baylor on December 16 in Detroit. In contrast to most of the Spartans' early season, the Spartans started strong and led throughout the game. After the Bears narrowed the MSU lead to two at 9–7 less than five minutes into the game, MSU outscored Baylor 36–10 for the remainder of the half. MSU led by as many as 30 in the first half and led 45–17 at halftime. Baylor started well in the second half, scoring the first seven points of the half, but MSU rebounded well, slamming the door on any potential comeback. MSU again pushed the lead to as many as 30 in the second half and easily won 88–64. Tyson Walker led all scorers with 25 points and notched five steals in the win. A. J. Hoggard added 14 points and five assists in the blowout. The win move MSU to 5–5 on the season. The win marked MSU's largest win over an AP-ranked top 10 team in school history.

==== Oakland ====
The Spartans returned home to face Oakland on December 18. MSU played well, leading by eight at the half. In the second half, MSU pushed the lead to as many as 21 over the Grizzlies as they won easily 79–62. Tyson Walker scored 14 points and put his career points at MSU over 1,000 in the win. Jaden Akins and A. J. Hoggard each added 11 points while Hoggard notched seven assists. The win moved MSU to 6–5 on the season.

==== Stony Brook ====
MSU faced Stony Brook on December 21 in East Lansing. The Spartans led from the start, limiting the Seawolves to only 12 points in the first half while scoring 48 points for a 36-point halftime lead. The lead was the largest halftime lead for Michigan State since 2017. The Spartans shot 59.4% from the field in the 99–55 blowout win. Jaden Akins had a career-high 22 points while Tyson Walker scored 17. Jeremy Fears Jr. and A. J. Hoggard each had 10 assists as MSU moved to 7–5 on the season.

==== Indiana State ====
The Spartans concluded the non-conference portion of their schedule by playing Indiana State on December 30. The meeting marked only the second time the teams had played each other, the first being the 1979 championship game. The Spartan offense played well, taking a 10-point lead at the half over the 11–1 Sycamores. Indiana State stuck around, taking a five-point lead with just under 11 minutes left in the game. However, the Spartans responded, outscoring ISU 28–11 to win the game 87–75. Tyson Walker scored 22 points and had five assists while Malik Hall scored 18. A. J. Hoggard scored 17 while Mady Sissoko has 12 rebounds. MSU played without freshman point guard Jeremy Fears Jr. who had been shot over the Christmas break. As a result, only eight Spartans placed in the game as Tom Izzo tightened his rotation. The win moved MSU to 8–5 on the season.

=== Remaining conference games ===
==== Penn State ====
The Spartans returned to conference play against Penn State on January 4, 2024 at Breslin Center. The Spartans dominated throughout, leading by 25 at the half with a 51–26 lead. Malik Hall led all scorers with 24 points, tying a career high, while Tyson Walker added 22. Mady Sissoko again notched 12 rebounds as MSU shot 56.3% from the field and 47.6% from three. Meanwhile, the Nittany Lions managed just 32.3% from the field and only 10.3% from three. The easy 92–61 win moved MSU to 9–5 on the season and 1–2 in conference play.

==== Northwestern ====
MSU returned to the road to face Northwestern on January 7. MSU took an early lead in the game, but with the game tied at 26 with just over seven minutes left in the half, the Wildcats went on a 20–5 run to close the half. MSU narrowed the lead to as little as six in the second half, but Northwestern answered every run. As a result, the Spartans lost 88–74 to end their five-game winning streak. Tyson Walker led all scorers with 27, but Malik Hall who had scored 42 points in the previous two games, was held scoreless. Jaden Akins and A. J. Hoggard added 13 points each in the loss. The loss dropped MSU to 9–6 and 1–3 on the season.

==== Illinois ====
MSU faced No, 10-ranked Illinois on January 11 in Champaign. Illinois led throughout the first half, leading by as many as eight points, but MSU was able to draw within three at the half. The Spartans took the lead with 15:35 remaining and pushed the lead to as many as six, but the Illini rallied to tie and take the lead. MSU held Illinois without a field goal from the floor in the final six minutes of the game, but missed several three-pointers late and fell 71–68. Tyson Walker had 17 while A. J. Hoggard added 16 and Malik Hall scored 14. The loss dropped MSU to 1–4 in the Big Ten, their worst in-conference start under Tom Izzo. The loss dropped them to 9–7 overall.

==== Rutgers ====
The Spartans returned home to face Rutgers on January 14. The teams exchanged the lead throughout the first half as neither team played well offensively. MSU was able to take a six-point lead, 28–22 at the half. In the second half, the Scarlet Knights rallied to take the lead with 15:20 left in the game. However, MSU answered, going on a 19–0 run to put the game away. The win halted the Spartans two-game losing streak. Late in the game, Steven Izzo, Tom Izzo's son and fifth-year walk-on, was able to score his first points as a Spartans making a basket while getting fouled and sinking the free throw. Malik Hall scored 15 for MSU while Tyson Walker added 13 in the 73–55 win. The win moved the Spartans to 10–7, 2–4 on the season.

==== Minnesota ====
Michigan State played Minnesota on January 18 at Breslin Center. The Spartans took an early lead and led throughout the half, but Minnesota kept the lead to single digits in the first half and trailed only by five at halftime. The Gophers, playing without the nation's leading assist man, Elijah Hawkins, kept the game close and even took the lead in the second half. The game remained close partly due to MSU only shooting three of 12 from three while Minnesota made seven threes. However, Malik Hall scored 16 points, including his 1,000 career point, and added 12 rebounds to notch his first career double-double. Tyson Walker played well late, scoring 21 as MSU pulled away for the 76–66 win. The win moved MSU to 11–7, 3–4 on the season. The win also marked Tom Izzo's 698th career win.

==== Maryland ====
The Spartans traveled to face Maryland on January 23 and jumped to an early lead, leading by as many at 15 in the first half. MSU dominated the Terrapins throughout the first half to lead 44–32 at halftime. The Spartans shot 58% from the field in the first half and limited Maryland to 37% in what appeared to be an easy blowout win. However, in the second half, MSU scored only 17 points on 11 baskets and surrendered the lead to Maryland. However, A. J. Hoggard's basket with 1:58 remaining put the Spartans ahead by three. Maryland narrowed the lead to one before Tyson Walker hit a three with 44 second remaining. Another basket by Maryland narrowed the lead to two and Walker missed a shot that would have sealed the game with seven seconds left. Tre Holloman knocked the ball loose as Maryland attempted to tie it to secure the Spartans 61–59 win. It marked the first road win of the season for MSU and their first win outside of the state of Michigan on the season. Walker scored 15 while Malik Hall, Hoggard, and Holloman each scored 12. The win moved MSU to 12–7, 4–4 on the season.

==== Wisconsin ====
MSU next faced Wisconsin in Madison, Wisconsin on January 26. The Spartans never led as the Badgers controlled most of the game, leading by nine at the break, 43–34. MSU's defense had no answer for Wisconsin as the Badgers shot 50% from the field. MSU shot the ball well, 41% overall and 42% from three, but it was not enough as they trailed by as many as 19 in the second half and lost 81–66. A. J. Hoggard scored 19 points to lead MSU while Malik Hall added 13 and Tyson Walker scored 11. The loss dropped MSU to 12–8, 4–5 in conference play.

==== Michigan ====
The Spartans returned home to face rival Michigan on January 30, Tom Izzo's 69th birthday. Both teams started the game well, Michigan shot over 60% from the field in the first half including 55% from three as the Wolverines led throughout the half. MSU also shot well in the first half, making 50% of their shots, but trailed by as many as nine in the half. They were able to narrow the lead to two, 35–33 at halftime. The Spartans' defense stepped up in the second half, limiting Michigan to only 25% from the field while MSU continued to shoot well, hitting on 60% of their shots in the second half. Jaden Akins hit a career-high seven three-pointers and led all scorers with 23. A Tyson Walker layup with just over 17 minutes left in the game put MSU in front to stay. The Spartans were able to push the lead to as many as 19 as MSU routed the Wolverines 81–62. A. J. Hoggard added 15 points while Walker and Malik Hall each had 12 in the win. The win marked Izzo's 700th career win, all at MSU. The Spartans moved to 13–8, 5–5 on the season with the win.

==== Maryland ====
MSU next played Maryland at Breslin Center on February 3. The Spartans took the early lead and led throughout the first half with a four-point lead at half time. The Terrapins kept the game close though and, with just over seven minutes left in the game, took their first lead of the game 42–41. However, the Spartans answered quickly, retaking the lead less than 15 seconds later. From there, MSU closed on a 20–12 run to pull away and notch a 63–54 win. Malik Hall and Tyson Walker each had 19 points in the win. MSU held Maryland to 30% shooting from the field and outrebounded the Terrapins 36–30. The win moved MSU to 14–8, 6–5 on the season.

==== Minnesota ====
The Spartans traveled to Minneapolis to face Minnesota on February 6. The game remained close throughout the first half while MSU shot 44% from the field and limited the Gophers to 37% in the half. Despite this, MSU was not able to pull away and led only by five at half time. In the second half, the Spartans moved the lead to as many as nine, but could not hold off Minnesota as they rallied to take the lead with less than eight minutes remaining. The team's exchanged leads for the remainder of the game. With 20 seconds left in the game and the Spartans trailing by three, A. J. Hoggard was fouled while shooting a three-pointer. Hoggard made the first two, but missed the third. Two free throws by Minnesota and a missed shot by Hoggard sealed the win for the Gophers. MSU fell 59–56. Tyson Walker scored 20 while Jaden Akins scored 16, but no other Spartan managed more than six. MSU made only seven of 17 free throws in the loss. The Spartans dropped to 14–9, 6–6 on the season. Walker's 20 points set a record of 34-straight double figure scoring games under Tom Izzo, the most of any player under Izzo.

==== Illinois ====
MSU next faced Illinois in East Lansing on February 10. The teams exchanged the lead throughout the first half in a high-scoring affair as MSU took the 44–41 halftime lead. In the second, the game remained close until Illinois took an eight-point lead with under eight minutes remaining. From there, the Spartans outscored Illinois 24–8 to pull out an 88–80 win. MSU shot over 52% from the field and made five of eight three-pointers. After struggling from the free throw line against Minnesota, the Spartans made 25 of 34 free throws against the Illini. A. J. Hoggard led the Spartans with 23 points and five assists. Malik Hall added 22 while Tyson Walker scored 19 in the win. The win moved the Spartans to 15–9 and 7–6 on the season.

===== Penn State =====
Returning to the road, the Spartans played Penn State on February 14. MSU fell behind early, but rallied to take the lead and led by as many as 17 in the first half. At halftime, the Spartans led 45–31 despite Tyson Walker not scoring a point in the half. In the second half, the Spartans were able to maintain their lead though the Nittany Lions narrowed the lead to single digits on several occasions. Malik Hall took over for the Spartans, scoring a career-high 29 point and adding 10 rebounds. Jaden Akins added 20 points while Carson Cooper scored 10 as the Spartans won their second road game of the season, beating Penn State 80–72. The win moved the Spartans to 16–9, 8–6 on the season. Tyson Walker only scored six points in the game, ending a streak of 35-straight games of scoring double figures, the longest of any player in Tom Izzo's career.

==== Michigan ====
The Spartans stayed on the road, facing rival Michigan in Ann Arbor on February 17. MSU took the early lead and led throughout the first half by as many as nine. But, the Wolverines battled back and had a chance to take the lead into halftime but a turnover on their final possession led to a foul and free throws that gave the Spartans a 39–37 lead. The Spartans struggled with fouls in the first half with A. J. Hoggard, Tre Holloman, and Jaden Akins each being limited with two fouls. Hoggard only played three minutes in the half. In the second half, the game remained close. However, the MSU defense stepped up and held Michigan without a point for the final seven minutes of the game, going on a 10–0 run to complete the first season sweep of the Wolverines since 2019. With a crowd that had many Spartan fans and whose cheers were clearly audible, the Spartans won 73–63. Tyson Walker scored 19 points while Malik Hall continued his strong play, scoring 18 in the win. The Spartans moved to 17–9, 9–6 on the season with win.

==== Iowa ====
MSU next played Iowa in East Lansing on February 20. The Spartans kept the game close in the first 16 minutes of the game, but Iowa was able to take the lead and pull away, leading by as many as 12 including a 45–33 lead at halftime. In the second half, MSU was able to narrow the lead to single digits on multiple occasions, but could not get close enough as they lost 78–71. MSU shot the ball well, making 45% of their shots, 50% from three, but gave up too many easy layups for Iowa and missed multiple easy layups of their own. Malik Hall and Tyson Walker scored 16 each as the Spartans three-game winning streak came to an end. The loss moved MSU to 17–10, 9–7 on the season.

==== Ohio State ====
Looking to rebound from the home loss to Iowa, the Spartans faced Ohio State on February 24 at Breslin Center. MSU led throughout the first half and led by 10 at halftime. Freshman big man Xavier Booker got the start for the Spartans as MSU looked to address the difficulties it had at the center position. The Spartans continued to lead throughout the second half, pushing the lead to as many as 12, but could not put the Buckeyes away. With six minutes remaining, OSU narrowed the lead to one. Following a jumper by Malik Hall with 5:40 remaining, the Spartans were limited to two points for the remainder of the half. A made free throw with 11 seconds remaining gave the Buckeyes a 57–56 lead. Tyson Walker was fouled on the ensuing possession, but made only one of two free throws with six seconds left leaving the game tied. OSU hit a three as the clock expired to give the Buckeyes the 60–57 win. Malik Hall scored 15 while Tyson Walker scored 12. Booker, who played well in the first half, but did not play much in the second half, scored seven in the loss. The loss dropped MSU to 17–11, 9–8 on the season.

==== Purdue ====
Facing a potential three-game losing streak, the Spartans traveled to face first-play Purdue. Michigan State started well, leading through much of the first half, but they simply could not handle Boilermaker big man Zach Edey. Purdue led by three at the half and pushed the lead to double digits in the second half. However, MSU was able to narrow the lead and keep it close. Edey's 32 points were too much for the Spartans as MSU lost 80–74. Xavier Booker tied his career high with 11 points while Tyson Walker led the team with 14 points. Jaden Akins scored 13 for MSU while Malik Hall added 12 in the loss. The Spartans dropped to 17–12, 9–9 on the season.

==== Northwestern ====
Four days later, MSU returned home for senior night against Northwestern. MSU started slow as neither team's offense performed well, but the Wildcats led throughout most of the first half and held a 25–20 lead at halftime. The Spartans narrowed the lead early in the second half and the game remained close throughout. Leading by one with just over three minutes left, MSU forced a turnover and Tyson Walker pushed the lead to three with 2:30 remaining. Walker added another layup with 1:44 remaining to push the lead to five. After a made three by Northwestern's Ryan Langborg, Tre Holloman made two free throws to guarantee the 53–49 win. Malik Hall, in his final game at home as a Spartan, netted a double double, 15 points and 17 rebounds. Tyson Walker, who reached 2,000 career points on the night scored 19 while Holloman added 12 in the win. The win moved the Spartans to 18–12, 10–9 on the season.

==== Indiana ====
In the season finale, the Spartans traveled to face Indiana on March 10. MSU again fell behind early, trailing 24–7 with less than nine minutes remaining in the first half. However, the Spartans narrowed the lead to 34–29 at halftime. MSU continued to play well early in the second half, taking the lead less than three minutes into the half. The Spartans led by as many as seven in the half, but could not extend the lead as the game remained close. Malik Hall fouled Hoosier big man Kel'el Ware with 14 second remaining and the game tied at 64. Ware missed the first free throw, but sank the second to give the Hoosiers a 65–64 lead. Tyson Walker's jumper with four seconds left fell short and the Spartans lost 65–64. The loss ended the regular season with the Spartans at 18–14, 10–10 to finish in a three-way tie for sixth place in conference play.

== Postseason ==
=== Big Ten tournament ===
Due to tiebreaking procedures, the Spartans received the No. 8 seed in the Big Ten tournament.

==== Minnesota ====
Facing Minnesota in the second round of the tournament on March 14, the teams exchanged leads throughout the first half with the Gophers taking a 34–32 lead at the half. As in the first half, the game remained close through most of the second half. A Tre Holloman three with 11:07 left gave the Spartans a lead they would never relinquish as they pulled away for a 77–67 win. The Spartans made five of eight three-pointers in the game with Holloman, A. J. Hoggard, and Jaden Akins combining to make 13 of 15 shots. Hoggard led the Spartans with 17 points while Tyson Walker scored 15 in the win. The win moved the Spartans to the quarterfinals against Purdue.

==== Purdue ====
In the quarterfinals against Purdue the next day, the Spartans kept the game close throughout, but were unable to take the lead. However, a Tyson Walker basket with 1:46 tied the game at 56. A Fletcher Loyer three on the next possession put the Boilermakers ahead to stay as they beat the Spartans 67–62. Walker scored 15 while Malik Hall added 12. Tre Holloman continued to play well, scoring 10 in the loss. The Spartans were whistled for 29 fouls in the game while Purdue only committed 17 fouls.

=== NCAA tournament ===
Due to losses by teams expected to be in the NCAA tournament on March 16, the Spartans were predicted by many to be on the bubble for a selection to the tournament. However, the Spartans were safely in the tournament, receiving the No. 9 seed in the West region extending Tom Izzo's record-breaking streak to 26 straight tournaments.

==== Mississippi State ====
The Spartans played Mississippi State in the first round of the NCAA tournament on March 21. The Spartans started well and never trailed in the game. MSU shot 50% from the field while limiting the Bulldogs to just 37%. Tyson Walker led all scorers with 19 points while Jaden Akins scored 15 and Malik Hall added 10. The Spartans led by seven at halftime and controlled the game in the second half. A. J. Hoggard dished out eight assists while Akins grabbed seven rebounds as the Spartans won easily 69–51. The win marked Tom Izzo's 20th first-round win and his 56th overall in the NCAA tournament.

==== North Carolina ====
MSU faced No. 1-seeded North Carolina on March 23. The Spartans started well, jumping out to an early lead and leading by as many as 12 with less than 10 minutes left in the first half. However, the Tar Heels finished the half on a 26–5 run to take a 40–31 lead at halftime. MSU drew within two points in the first five minutes of the second half, but could come no closer as they lost 85–69. In his final collegiate game, Tyson Walker led the Spartans with 24 points. Malik Hall, also in his final game, scored 17 while Jaden Akins scored 11 in the loss. The loss ended the Spartans' season at a disappointing 20–15.

== Roster ==
2023–24 Michigan State Spartans men's basketball team
Players
Coaches

| Pos. | # | Name | Height | Weight | Year | Previous school | Hometown |
|---|---|---|---|---|---|---|---|
| G | 3 | Jaden Akins | 6 ft 4 in (1.93 m) | 180 lb (82 kg) | Jr | Sunrise Christian Academy | Farmington, MI |
| F | 34 | Xavier Booker | 6 ft 10 in (2.08 m) | 210 lb (95 kg) | Fr | Cathedral High School | Indianapolis, IN |
| F | 55 | Coen Carr | 6 ft 7 in (2.01 m) | 200 lb (91 kg) | Fr | Legacy Early College | Greenville, SC |
| C | 15 | Carson Cooper | 6 ft 11 in (2.11 m) | 210 lb (95 kg) | So | IMG Academy | Jackson, MI |
| G | 1 | Jeremy Fears Jr. | 6 ft 2 in (1.88 m) | 175 lb (79 kg) | Fr | Joliet West High School | Joliet, IL |
| F | 25 | Malik Hall | 6 ft 8 in (2.03 m) | 225 lb (102 kg) | GS | Sunrise Christian Academy | Aurora, IL |
| G | 11 | A. J. Hoggard | 6 ft 4 in (1.93 m) | 210 lb (95 kg) | Sr | Huntington Prep | Coatesville, PA |
| G | 5 | Trejuan Holloman | 6 ft 2 in (1.88 m) | 175 lb (79 kg) | So | Cretin-Derham Hall High School | St. Paul, MN |
| G | 13 | Steven Izzo (W) | 5 ft 8 in (1.73 m) | 150 lb (68 kg) | GS | Lansing Catholic | East Lansing, MI |
| F | 0 | Jaxon Kohler | 6 ft 9 in (2.06 m) | 250 lb (113 kg) | So | Southern California Academy | America Fork, UT |
| F | 7 | Gehrig Normand | 6 ft 6 in (1.98 m) | 180 lb (82 kg) | Fr | Birdville High School | North Richland Hills, TX |
| G | 20 | Nick Sanders (W) | 5 ft 9 in (1.75 m) | 170 lb (77 kg) | So | Detroit Country Day School | Franklin, MI |
| C | 22 | Mady Sissoko | 6 ft 9 in (2.06 m) | 235 lb (107 kg) | Sr | Wasatch Academy | Bafoulabé, Mali |
| G | 14 | Davis Smith | 6 ft 0 in (1.83 m) | 160 lb (73 kg) | Sr | Westminster | Atlanta, GA |
| G | 2 | Tyson Walker | 6 ft 0 in (1.83 m) | 175 lb (79 kg) | GS | Northeastern; Christ the King Prep | Westbury, NY |

Head coach

- Tom Izzo (Northern Michigan)

Assistant coach(es)

- Mark Montgomery (Michigan State)
- Doug Wojcik (Navy)
- Thomas Kelley (Michigan State)

Legend

- (C) Team captain
- (S) Suspended
- (I) Ineligible
- (W) Walk-on
- Injured
- Current redshirt

Roster

== Schedule and results ==
The Spartans participated in the Champions Classic and the Gavitt Tipoff Games. MSU played Arizona on Thanksgiving at Acrisure Arena in Thousand Palms, California. On June 18, it was reported that the Spartans would play Baylor in December at Little Caesars Arena. On August 30, the school announced that the team would play Tennessee in East Lansing in an exhibition for charity with all proceeds being donated to relief efforts associated with the Hawaii wildfires. The teams had previously agreed to play a closed scrimmage as they had done in 2022. On September 19, the Big Ten announced the conference schedule.

| Date time, TV | Rank^{#} | Opponent^{#} | Result | Record | High points | High rebounds | High assists | Site (attendance) city, state |
Exhibition
| October 25, 2023*; 7:00 p.m., BTN+ | No. 4 | Hillsdale | W 85–43 | | 13 – Tied | 7 – Walker | 8 – Tied | Breslin Center (14,797); East Lansing, MI |
| October 29, 2023*; 3:30 p.m., BTN | No. 4 | No. 9 Tennessee; Charity Exhibition | L 88–89 | | 22 – Walker | 11 – Hall | 6 – Akins | Breslin Center (14,797); East Lansing, MI |
Regular season
| November 6, 2023*; 8:30 p.m., BTN | No. 4 | James Madison | L 76–79 ^{OT} | 0–1 | 35 – Walker | 11 – Akins | 3 – 3 Tied | Breslin Center (14,797); East Lansing, MI |
| November 9, 2023*; 7:00 p.m., BTN | No. 4 | Southern Indiana | W 74–51 | 1–1 | 14 – Walker | 10 – Sissoko | 5 – 2 Tied | Breslin Center (14,797); East Lansing, MI |
| November 14, 2023*; 7:00 p.m., ESPN | No. 18 | vs. No. 9 Duke; Champions Classic | L 65–74 | 1–2 | 22 – Walker | 8 – 2 Tied | 8 – Hoggard | United Center; Chicago, IL |
| November 17, 2023*; 6:30 p.m., FS1 | No. 18 | Butler; Gavitt Tipoff Games | W 74–54 | 2–2 | 21 – Walker | 11 – Cooper | 4 – 2 Tied | Breslin Center (14,797); East Lansing, MI |
| November 19, 2023*; 6:00 p.m., BTN | No. 18 | Alcorn State; Acrisure Classic campus game | W 81–49 | 3–2 | 17 – Holloman | 7 – Sissoko | 5 – Tied | Breslin Center (14,797); East Lansing, MI |
| November 23, 2023*; 4:00 p.m., FOX | No. 21 | vs. No. 3 Arizona; Acrisure Classic | L 68–74 | 3–3 | 18 – Walker | 10 – Sissoko | 4 – Walker | Acrisure Arena (9,112); Thousand Palms, CA |
| November 28, 2023*; 6:30 p.m., BTN | | Georgia Southern | W 86–55 | 4–3 | 14 – Akins | 10 – Fears Jr. | 10 – Holloman | Breslin Center (14,797); East Lansing, MI |
| December 5, 2023; 7:00 p.m., Peacock | | No. 23 Wisconsin | L 57–70 | 4–4 (0–1) | 22 – Walker | 7 – Cooper | 7 – Hoggard | Breslin Center (14,797); East Lansing, MI |
| December 10, 2023; 6:30 p.m., BTN | | at Nebraska | L 70–77 | 4–5 (0–2) | 22 – Hall | 7 – Hall | 3 – Hall | Pinnacle Bank Arena (14,585); Lincoln, NE |
| December 16, 2023*; 2:00 p.m., FOX | | vs. No. 6 Baylor; Motor City Invitational | W 88–64 | 5–5 | 25 – Walker | 8 – Sissoko | 5 – Hoggard | Little Caesars Arena (13,277); Detroit, MI |
| December 18, 2023*; 7:00 p.m., BTN | | Oakland | W 79–62 | 6–5 | 14 – Walker | 8 – Tied | 7 – Hoggard | Breslin Center (14,797); East Lansing, MI |
| December 21, 2023*; 6:30 p.m., BTN+ | | Stony Brook | W 99–55 | 7–5 | 22 – Akins | 7 – Booker | 10 – Tied | Breslin Center (14,797); East Lansing, MI |
| December 30, 2023*; 2:00 p.m., FS1 | | Indiana State | W 87–75 | 8–5 | 22 – Walker | 12 – Sissoko | 5 – Tied | Breslin Center (14,797); East Lansing, MI |
| January 4, 2024; 7:00 p.m., Peacock | | Penn State | W 92–61 | 9–5 (1–2) | 24 – Hall | 12 – Sissoko | 6 – Holloman | Breslin Center (14,797); East Lansing, MI |
| January 7, 2024; 7:30 p.m., BTN | | at Northwestern | L 74–88 | 9–6 (1–3) | 27 – Walker | 6 – Cooper | 8 – Hoggard | Welsh–Ryan Arena (7,039); Evanston, IL |
| January 11, 2024; 9:00 p.m., FS1 | | at No. 10 Illinois | L 68–71 | 9–7 (1–4) | 17 – Walker | 10 – Sissoko | 3 – 3 Tied | State Farm Center (14,727); Champaign, IL |
| January 14, 2024; 12:00 p.m., BTN | | Rutgers | W 73–55 | 10–7 (2–4) | 15 – Hall | 7 – Sissoko | 6 – Tied | Breslin Center (14,797); East Lansing, MI |
| January 18, 2024; 6:30 p.m., FS1 | | Minnesota | W 76–66 | 11–7 (3–4) | 21 – Walker | 12 – Hall | 7 – Hoggard | Breslin Center (14,797); East Lansing, MI |
| January 21, 2024; 12:00 p.m., CBS | | at Maryland | W 61–59 | 12–7 (4–4) | 15 – Walker | 6 – Hall | 5 – Walker | Xfinity Center (15,103); College Park, MD |
| January 26, 2024; 8:00 p.m., FS1 | | at No. 13 Wisconsin | L 66–81 | 12–8 (4–5) | 19 – Hoggard | 6 – Sissoko | 5 – Walker | Kohl Center (17,071); Madison, WI |
| January 30, 2024; 9:00 p.m., Peacock | | Michigan; Rivalry | W 81–62 | 13–8 (5–5) | 23 – Akins | 4 – Tied | 7 – Hoggard | Breslin Center (14,797); East Lansing, MI |
| February 3, 2024; 5:30 p.m., FOX | | Maryland | W 63–54 | 14–8 (6–5) | 19 – Tied | 7 – Hall | 8 – Hoggard | Breslin Center (14,797); East Lansing, MI |
| February 6, 2024; 9:00 p.m., Peacock | | at Minnesota | L 56–59 | 14–9 (6–6) | 20 – Walker | 6 – Sissoko | 5 – Hoggard | Williams Arena (8,239); Minneapolis, MN |
| February 10, 2024; 2:00 p.m., CBS | | No. 10 Illinois | W 88–80 | 15–9 (7–6) | 23 – Hoggard | 6 – Akins | 5 – Hoggard | Breslin Center (14,797); East Lansing, MI |
| February 14, 2024; 6:30 p.m., BTN | | at Penn State | W 80–72 | 16–9 (8–6) | 29 – Hall | 10 – Hall | 5 – Hoggard | Bryce Jordan Center (8,813); University Park, PA |
| February 17, 2024; 8:00 p.m., FOX | | at Michigan; Rivalry | W 73–63 | 17–9 (9–6) | 19 – Walker | 7 – Tied | 4 – Hoggard | Crisler Center (12,707); Ann Arbor, MI |
| February 20, 2024; 7:00 p.m., Peacock | | Iowa | L 71–78 | 17–10 (9–7) | 16 – Tied | 10 – Hall | 5 – Tied | Breslin Center (14,797); East Lansing, MI |
| February 25, 2024; 4:00 p.m., CBS | | Ohio State | L 57–60 | 17–11 (9–8) | 15 – Hall | 7 – Hall | 4 – Hoggard | Breslin Center (14,797); East Lansing, MI |
| March 2, 2024; 8:00 p.m., FOX | | at No. 2 Purdue | L 74–80 | 17–12 (9–9) | 14 – Walker | 7 – Walker | 4 – Tied | Mackey Arena (14,876); West Lafayette, IN |
| March 6, 2024; 7:00 p.m., BTN | | Northwestern | W 53–49 | 18–12 (10–9) | 19 – Walker | 17 – Hall | 5 – Walker | Breslin Center (14,797); East Lansing, MI |
| March 10, 2024; 4:30 p.m., CBS | | at Indiana | L 64–65 | 18–13 (10–10) | 30 – Walker | 7 – Hall | 6 – Hoggard | Simon Skjodt Assembly Hall (16,304); Bloomington, IN |
Big Ten tournament
| March 14, 2024; 12:00 p.m., BTN | (8) | vs. (9) Minnesota; Second Round | W 77−67 | 19–13 | 17 – Hoggard | 7 – Akins | 6 – Hoggard | Target Center; Minneapolis, MN |
| March 15, 2024; 12:00 p.m., BTN | (8) | vs. (1) No. 3 Purdue; Quarterfinals | L 62–67 | 19–14 | 15 – Walker | 7 – Tied | 10 – Hoggard | Target Center (12,498); Minneapolis, MN |
NCAA tournament
| March 21, 2024; 12:15 p.m., CBS | (9 W) | vs. (8 W) Mississippi State; First Round | W 69–51 | 20–14 | 19 – Walker | 9 – Sissoko | 8 – Hoggard | Spectrum Center; Charlotte, NC |
| March 23, 2024; 5:30 p.m., CBS | (9 W) | vs. (1 W) No. 5 North Carolina; Second Round | L 69–85 | 20–15 | 24 – Walker | 9 – Hall | 4 – Hoggard | Spectrum Center; Charlotte, NC |
*Non-conference game. ^{#}Rankings from AP Poll. (#) Tournament seedings in parentheses. W=West. All times are in Eastern Time.

== Player statistics ==
Individual player statistics (Final)
| | | | Minutes | | Scoring | | Total FGs | | | 3-point FGs | | | Free-Throws | | | Rebounds | | | | | | | |
| Player | GP | GS | Tot | Avg | Pts | Avg | FG | FGA | Pct | 3FG | 3FA | Pct | FT | FTA | Pct | Off | Def | Tot | Avg | A | Stl | Blk | TO |
|---|---|---|---|---|---|---|---|---|---|---|---|---|---|---|---|---|---|---|---|---|---|---|---|
| Akins, Jaden | 35 | 35 | 995 | 28.4 | 363 | 10.4 | 141 | 344 | .410 | 64 | 176 | .364 | 17 | 23 | .739 | 39 | 96 | 135 | 3.9 | 41 | 39 | 14 | 34 |
| Booker, Xavier | 27 | 2 | 249 | 9.2 | 100 | 3.7 | 36 | 82 | .439 | 16 | 48 | .333 | 12 | 19 | .632 | 9 | 37 | 46 | 1.7 | 6 | 3 | 14 | 7 |
| Carr, Coen | 35 | 0 | 407 | 11.6 | 110 | 3.1 | 41 | 63 | .651 | 0 | 0 | | 28 | 50 | .560 | 24 | 40 | 64 | 1.8 | 9 | 18 | 18 | 18 |
| Cooper, Carson | 35 | 8 | 595 | 17.0 | 118 | 3.4 | 40 | 75 | .533 | 0 | 0 | | 38 | 60 | .633 | 52 | 103 | 155 | 4.4 | 16 | 15 | 23 | 26 |
| Fears, Jr., Jeremy | 12 | 0 | 184 | 15.3 | 42 | 3.5 | 15 | 30 | .500 | 1 | 6 | .167 | 11 | 17 | .647 | 2 | 21 | 23 | 1.9 | 40 | 10 | 2 | 13 |
| Hall, Malik | 35 | 34 | 1002 | 28.6 | 443 | 12.7 | 166 | 316 | .525 | 20 | 61 | .328 | 91 | 125 | .728 | 61 | 139 | 200 | 5.7 | 66 | 18 | 10 | 50 |
| Hoggard, AJ | 35 | 34 | 1003 | 28.7 | 374 | 10.7 | 132 | 324 | .407 | 25 | 72 | .347 | 85 | 108 | .787 | 21 | 87 | 108 | 3.4 | 183 | 50 | 11 | 64 |
| Holloman, Tre | 35 | 2 | 690 | 19.7 | 200 | 5.7 | 73 | 155 | .471 | 34 | 80 | .425 | 20 | 25 | .800 | 7 | 49 | 56 | 1.6 | 84 | 21 | 9 | 30 |
| Izzo, Steven | 10 | 0 | 12 | 1.2 | 3 | 0.3 | 1 | 5 | .200 | 0 | 2 | .000 | 1 | 3 | .333 | 1 | 3 | 4 | 0.4 | 2 | 0 | 0 | 1 |
| Kohler, Jaxon | 21 | 0 | 195 | 9..3 | 42 | 2.0 | 20 | 46 | .435 | 0 | 3 | .000 | 2 | 7 | .286 | 17 | 25 | 42 | 2.0 | 4 | 2 | 11 | 9 |
| Sanders, Nick | 9 | 0 | 12 | 1.3 | 3 | 0.3 | 1 | 4 | .250 | 1 | 3 | .333 | 0 | 0 | | 0 | 0 | 0 | 0.0 | 0 | 0 | 0 | 0 |
| Sissoko, Mady | 35 | 26 | 532 | 15.2 | 115 | 3.3 | 42 | 74 | .568 | 0 | 0 | | 31 | 44 | .705 | 52 | 128 | 180 | 5.1 | 9 | 8 | 15 | 32 |
| Smith, Davis | 12 | 0 | 28 | 2.3 | 13 | 1.1 | 3 | 10 | .300 | 2 | 5 | .400 | 5 | 7 | .714 | 1 | 1 | 2 | 0.2 | 2 | 0 | 1 | 1 |
| Walker, Tyson | 34 | 34 | 1121 | 33.0 | 625 | 18.4 | 238 | 530 | .449 | 64 | 170 | .376 | 85 | 114 | .746 | 19 | 78 | 97 | 2.9 | 96 | 64 | 4 | 46 |
| Total | 34 | | 6825 | | 2484 | 73.0 | 923 | 1999 | .462 | 221 | 610 | .362 | 415 | 587 | .707 | 347 | 831 | 1178 | 34.6 | 552 | 245 | 131 | 339 |
| Opponents | 35 | | 7025 | | 2312 | 66.1 | 800 | 1938 | .413 | 263 | 806 | .326 | 449 | 628 | .715 | 344 | 832 | 1176 | 33.6 | 438 | 186 | 112 | 432 |

Legend
| GP | Games played | GS | Games started | Avg | Average per game |
| FG | Field-goals made | FGA | Field-goal attempts | Off | Offensive rebounds |
| Def | Defensive rebounds | A | Assists | TO | Turnovers |
| Blk | Blocks | Stl |

== Rankings ==
Ranking movements Legend: ██ Increase in ranking ██ Decrease in ranking — = Not ranked RV = Received votes ( ) = First-place votes
| | Week | | | | | | | | | | | | | | | | | | | | |
| Poll | Pre | 1 | 2 | 3 | 4 | 5 | 6 | 7 | 8 | 9 | 10 | 11 | 12 | 13 | 14 | 15 | 16 | 17 | 18 | 19 | Final |
|---|---|---|---|---|---|---|---|---|---|---|---|---|---|---|---|---|---|---|---|---|---|
| AP | 4 (1) | 18 | 21 | RV | RV | — | RV | RV | RV | RV | — | RV | — | RV | RV | RV | — | RV | — | — | RV |
| Coaches | 4 | 19 | 19 | 25 | RV | — | RV | RV | RV | RV | — | RV | — | RV | RV | RV | — | — | — | RV | RV |

== Awards and honors ==
=== Postseason awards ===
==== Malik Hall ====
- All-Big Ten Honorable Mention (coaches and media)

==== A. J. Hoggard ====
- All-Big Ten Honorable Mention (coaches and media)

==== Tyson Walker ====
- All-Big Ten Second Team (coaches and media)
