= Jaxon Kohler =

American basketball player (born 2003)

No. 0 – BYU Cougars
- Position: Power forward
- League: Big 12 Conference

Personal information
- Born: June 17, 2003 (age 23) American Fork, Utah, U.S.
- Listed height: 6 ft 10 in (2.08 m)
- Listed weight: 245 lb (111 kg)

Career information
- High school: Wasatch Academy (Mount Pleasant, Utah); Coronado (Henderson, Nevada); American Fork (American Fork, Utah); Southern California Academy (Castaic, California)
- College: Michigan State (2022–2026); BYU (2026–present)

Jaxon Jeffry Kohler (born June 17, 2003) is an American college basketball player for the BYU Cougars of the Big 12 Conference. He previously played for the Michigan State Spartans.

== Early life and high school ==
Kohler grew up in American Fork, Utah and initially attended Wasatch Academy. He transferred to Coronado High School in Henderson, Nevada, after his freshman year. After one year, Kohler moved back to Utah and enrolled at American Fork High School. He averaged 21.6 points, 8.9 rebounds, and 2.5 assists and was named the Utah 6A Player of the Year. He transferred a fourth time to Southern California Academy in Castaic, California, before the start of his senior year. Kohler was rated a four-star recruit and committed to play college basketball at Michigan State over offers from Iowa, USC, and Nebraska.

== College career ==
=== Michigan State ===
Kohler played in all 34 of the Michigan State Spartans' games during his freshman season and averaged 3.0 points and 2.9 rebounds. He missed the first 13 games of his sophomore season due to a foot injury. Kohler played in 21 games as a sophomore and averaged 2.0 points and 2.0 rebounds per game. Kohler played only limited minutes in his first two seasons with MSU

In his junior season, Kohler started 34 of 37 games as the Spartans reached the Elite Eight of the NCAA tournament. Kohler set a career high for points in a game with 20 points scored in a 96–60 win over Niagara on November 7, 2024. He notched career-highs in all major stat categories for the season and was a key member of the Big Ten championship team.

In his senior season at Michigan State, Kohler was named a team captain for the Spartans. On November 13, 2025, he grabbed a career-high 18 rebounds against San Jose State.

=== BYU ===
In August 2026, Kohler was granted a temporary restraining order against the NCAA and as a result granted a fifth season of eligibility after filing a lawsuit in the state of California. He committed to play his final season at BYU.

== Professional career ==
In June 2026, Kohler signed an Exhibit 10 contract with the Utah Jazz and played with the team in the 2026 NBA Summer League.

== Career statistics ==
Legend
GP	Games played	GS	Games started	MPG	Minutes per game
FG%	Field goal percentage	3P%	3-point field goal percentage	FT%	Free throw percentage
RPG	Rebounds per game	APG	Assists per game	SPG	Steals per game
BPG	Blocks per game	PPG	Points per game	**Bold**	Career high

=== College ===
Year	Team	GP	GS	MPG	FG%	3P%	FT%	RPG	APG	SPG	BPG	PPG
2022–23	Michigan State	34	0	10.8	.505	.000	.250	2.9	.3	.1	.5	3.0
2023–24	Michigan State	21	0	9.3	.435	.000	.286	2.0	.2	.1	.5	2.0
2024–25	Michigan State	**37**	34	20.8	**.519**	.373	.821	7.5	**1.3**	.4	**.8**	7.8
2025–26	Michigan State	35	**35**	**27.7**	.500	**.389**	**.869**	**8.9**	**1.3**	**.6**	.7	**12.5**
2026–27	BYU											
Career		127	69	18.1	.502	.376	.780	5.7	.9	.3	.6	6.9
