= Jaden Akins =

American basketball player (born 2003)

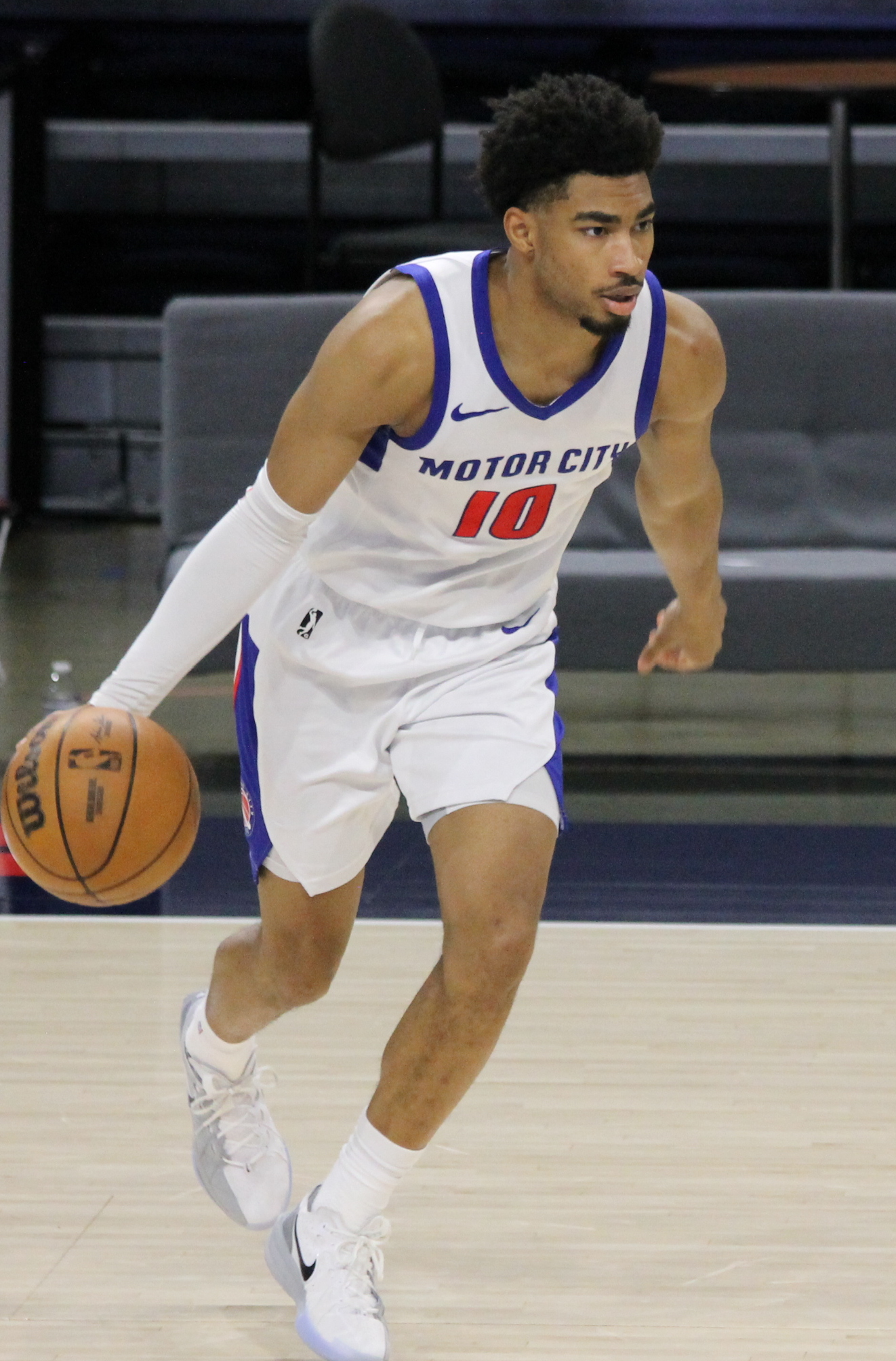
- Akins with the Motor City Cruise in 2026

No. 14 – New York Knicks
- Position: Point guard
- League: NBA

Personal information
- Born: February 25, 2003 (age 23) Farmington Hills, Michigan, U.S.
- Listed height: 6 ft 2 in (1.88 m)
- Listed weight: 195 lb (88 kg)

Career information
- High school: Farmington (Farmington, Michigan); Ypsi Prep Academy (Ypsilanti, Michigan); Sunrise Christian Academy (Wichita, Kansas)
- College: Michigan State (2021–2025)
- NBA draft: 2025: undrafted
- Playing career: 2025–present

Career history
- 2025–2026: Motor City Cruise
- 2026–present: New York Knicks
- 2026–present: →Westchester Knicks

Career highlights
- Third-team All-Big Ten (2025); Big Ten All-Defensive Team (2025)
- Stats at NBA.com
- Stats at Basketball Reference

Jaden Christopher Akins (born February 25, 2003) is an American professional basketball player for the New York Knicks of the National Basketball Association (NBA), on a two-way contract with the Westchester Knicks of the NBA G League. He played college basketball for the Michigan State Spartans.

== Early life and high school ==
During his high school career, Akins attended Farmington High School, Ypsi Prep Academy, and Sunrise Christian Academy. He was rated as a four-star recruit and committed to play college basketball for the Michigan State Spartans over offers from schools such as Iowa, Missouri, Xavier, Georgia Tech, Michigan, and Mississippi State.

== College career ==
As a freshman in 2021–22, Akins averaged 3.4 points in 15 minutes per game. On November 18, 2022, he recorded nine points, five rebounds and two assists in a victory against Villanova. On January 19, 2023, Akins tallied 11 points, five rebounds, four assists, four steals and a block against Rutgers. On February 25, 2023, he scored 21 points in a loss to Iowa. In 2022–23, Akins averaged 9.8 points, 4.0 rebounds, 1.2 assists and 1.2 steals in 27.4 minutes a game. On December 21, 2023, he recorded 22 points while hitting four threes in a victory against Stony Brook. In the first round of the 2024 NCAA Division I men's basketball tournament, Akins totaled 15 points and seven rebounds as he helped the Spartans advance beating Mississippi State. During the 2023–24 season, he made 35 starts, where he averaged 10.4 points and 3.9 rebounds per game.

Heading into the 2024–25 season, Akins was named one of the Spartan's team captains. On November 4, 2024, he put up 23 points, nine rebounds, five assists, two blocks and two steals in an 81–57 win over Monmouth. On November 7, Akins recorded ten points, six rebounds, and two assists in win over Niagara. On January 12, 2025, he became the 57th player in Michigan State history to score 1,000 points in a win over Northwestern. On March 2, 2025, Akins tallied 19 points and eight rebounds in a win over Wisconsin.

== Professional career ==
After going undrafted, Akins made his 2025 NBA Summer League debut with the Orlando Magic. On October 11, 2025, the Detroit Pistons added Akins to their roster on an Exhibit 10 contract. On October 13, he was waived by the Pistons.

On September 15, 2026, Akins signed an Exhibit 10 contract with the New York Knicks, but was waived the same day.

== Career statistics ==
Legend
GP	Games played	GS	Games started	MPG	Minutes per game
FG%	Field goal percentage	3P%	3-point field goal percentage	FT%	Free throw percentage
RPG	Rebounds per game	APG	Assists per game	SPG	Steals per game
BPG	Blocks per game	PPG	Points per game	**Bold**	Career high

=== College ===
Year	Team	GP	GS	MPG	FG%	3P%	FT%	RPG	APG	SPG	BPG	PPG
2021–22	Michigan State	36	1	14.8	.394	.380	.607	2.4	.7	.6	.3	3.4
2022–23	Michigan State	30	25	27.4	**.420**	**.422**	.706	**4.0**	1.2	**1.2**	**.4**	9.8
2023–24	Michigan State	35	35	**28.4**	.410	.364	.739	3.9	1.2	1.1	**.4**	10.4
2024–25	Michigan State	**37**	**37**	27.2	.398	.293	**.762**	3.5	**1.5**	.8	.3	**12.8**
Career		138	98	24.3	.406	.352	.722	3.4	1.1	.9	.3	9.1
