= Carson Cooper (basketball) =

American basketball player (born 2004)

No. 20 – Los Angeles Lakers
- Position: Center
- League: NBA

Personal information
- Born: April 9, 2004 (age 22) Jackson, Michigan, U.S.
- Listed height: 6 ft 10 in (2.08 m)
- Listed weight: 245 lb (111 kg)

Career information
- High school: Northwest (Jackson, Michigan); Ypsi Prep (Ypsilanti, Michigan); IMG Academy (Bradenton, Florida)
- College: Michigan State (2022–2026)
- NBA draft: 2026: undrafted
- Playing career: 2026–present

Career history
- 2026: Memphis Grizzlies
- 2026–present: Los Angeles Lakers
- 2026–present: →Coachella Valley Lakers
- Stats at NBA.com
- Stats at Basketball Reference

Carson John Cooper (born April 9, 2004) is an American basketball player for the Los Angeles Lakers of the National Basketball Association (NBA), on a two-way contract with the Coachella Valley Lakers of the NBA G League. He played college basketball for the Michigan State Spartans.

== Early life and high school ==
Cooper attended Northwest High School, Ypsi Prep, and IMG Academy. As a senior at IMG, he averaged 12.4 points and 7.9 rebounds per game. Coming out of high school, Cooper committed to play college basketball for the Michigan State Spartans over offers from schools such as Eastern Michigan, Duquesne, Vermont.

== College career ==
In the first round of the 2023 NCAA tournament, Cooper scored six points in a victory over USC. As a freshman in 2022-23, he averaged 1.6 points and 0.9 rebounds in 30 games. On November 17, 2023, Cooper made his first start where he recorded three points, 11 rebounds, two blocks, and a steal in a win over Butler. During the 2023-24 season, he appeared in 35 games with eight starts, where he averaged 3.4 points, 4.4 rebounds, and 0.7 blocks per game. On December 30, 2024, Cooper notched a career-high 13 points along with six rebounds in a win against Western Michigan. In the semifinals of the 2025 Big Ten tournament, he recorded eight points and ten rebounds in a loss to Wisconsin. In the first round of the 2025 NCAA tournament, Cooper recorded six points and nine rebounds in a win over Bryant.

== Professional career ==
After going undrafted in the 2026 NBA draft, Cooper signed a two-way contract with the Memphis Grizzlies.

On November 10, 2026, Cooper signed a two-way contract with the Los Angeles Lakers.

== Career statistics ==
Legend
| GP | Games played | GS | Games started | MPG | Minutes per game |
| FG% | Field goal percentage | 3P% | 3-point field goal percentage | FT% | Free throw percentage |
| RPG | Rebounds per game | APG | Assists per game | SPG | Steals per game |
| BPG | Blocks per game | PPG | Points per game | **Bold** | Career high |

=== NBA ===
| Year | Team | GP | GS | MPG | FG% | 3P% | FT% | RPG | APG | SPG | BPG | PPG |
|---|---|---|---|---|---|---|---|---|---|---|---|---|
| 2026–27 | Memphis | 1 | 0 | 3.0 | .000 | .000 | 50.0 | 2.0 | 1.0 | .0 | .0 | 1.0 |
| Career | | 1 | 0 | 3.0 | .000 | .000 | 50.0 | 2.0 | 1.0 | .0 | .0 | 1.0 |

=== College ===
| Year | Team | GP | GS | MPG | FG% | 3P% | FT% | RPG | APG | SPG | BPG | PPG |
|---|---|---|---|---|---|---|---|---|---|---|---|---|
| 2022–23 | Michigan State | 30 | 0 | 6.6 | **.731** | - | .474 | .9 | .1 | .1 | .3 | 1.6 |
| 2023–24 | Michigan State | 35 | 8 | 17.0 | .533 | - | .633 | 4.4 | .5 | .4 | .7 | 3.4 |
| 2024–25 | Michigan State | **37** | 0 | 17.2 | .598 | .000 | .744 | 5.2 | .6 | .2 | .6 | 5.0 |
| 2025–26 | Michigan State | 35 | **35** | **26.7** | .584 | **.400** | **.788** | **7.1** | **1.5** | **.6** | **1.0** | **11.1** |
| Career | | 137 | 43 | 17.2 | .588 | .333 | .726 | 4.5 | .7 | .3 | .6 | 5.4 |
