= Xavier Booker =

American basketball player

No. 1 – UCLA Bruins
- Position: Center / power forward
- League: Big Ten Conference

Personal information
- Born: September 9, 2004 (age 22) St. Louis, Missouri, U.S.
- Listed height: 6 ft 11 in (2.11 m)
- Listed weight: 250 lb (113 kg)

Career information
- High school: Cathedral (Indianapolis, Indiana)
- College: Michigan State (2023–2025); UCLA (2025–present)

Career highlights
- McDonald's All-American (2023); Jordan Brand Classic (2023)

Xavier Ellis Booker (born September 9, 2004) is an American college basketball player for the UCLA Bruins of the Big Ten Conference. He previously played for the Michigan State Spartans. He was a consensus five-star recruit and one of the top players in the 2023 class.

== Early life ==
Booker grew up in Indianapolis, Indiana, and attended Cathedral High School. A 6-foot-10-inch (2.08 m) center, he averaged 12.5 points, 6.7 rebounds and 2.3 blocks per game as a junior as Cathedral won the Class 4A state championship. Booker was selected to play in the 2023 McDonald's All-American Boys Game. He was also named the Indianapolis City Co-Player of the Year.

Booker was a consensus five-star recruit and one of the top players in the 2023 class, according to major recruiting services. On July 30, 2022, he committed to playing college basketball for Michigan State over offers from Auburn, Duke, Cincinnati, Gonzaga, Indiana, Michigan, Notre Dame, Ohio State, Oregon and Purdue.

College recruiting
Name	Hometown	School	Height	Weight	Commit date
Xavier Booker; C	Indianapolis, IN	Cathedral (IN)	6 ft 10 in (2.08 m)	210 lb (95 kg)	Jul 30, 2022
Xavier Booker; C	Recruit ratings: Rivals: 247Sports: ESPN: (90)				
Overall recruit ranking: Rivals: 16 247Sports: 11 ESPN: 16
Note: In many cases, Scout, Rivals, 247Sports, On3, and ESPN may conflict in their listings of height and weight.; In these cases, the average was taken. ESPN grades are on a 100-point scale.; Sources: "Michigan 2023 Basketball Commitments". Rivals.; "2023 Michigan State Spartans Recruiting Class". ESPN.; "2023 Team Ranking". Rivals.

== College career ==
Booker enrolled at Michigan State University shortly after graduating high school in May 2023. In his freshman season, he appeared in 27 games and made two starts, averaging 3.7 points and 1.7 rebounds per game. In his sophomore season, he averaged 4.7 points and 2.2 rebounds per game in 33 appearances, including 3 starts.

On April 1, 2025, Booker announced he would be entering the NCAA transfer portal, and on April 4, he announced he would officially be transferring to the University of California, Los Angeles, with two years of college eligibility remaining. The Bruins earned a No. 7 seed in the 2026 NCAA tournament. In UCLA's opener, Booker started in place of an injured Tyler Bilodeau, the team's leading scorer, and he scored 15 points along with eight rebounds and four blocks in a 75–71 win over No. 10–seed UCF.

== Career statistics ==
Legend
GP	Games played	GS	Games started	MPG	Minutes per game
FG%	Field goal percentage	3P%	3-point field goal percentage	FT%	Free throw percentage
RPG	Rebounds per game	APG	Assists per game	SPG	Steals per game
BPG	Blocks per game	PPG	Points per game	**Bold**	Career high

=== College ===
Year	Team	GP	GS	MPG	FG%	3P%	FT%	RPG	APG	SPG	BPG	PPG
2023–24	Michigan State	27	2	9.3	.439	.333	.632	1.7	.2	.1	.5	3.7
2024–25	Michigan State	33	3	12.8	.417	.233	.786	2.2	.2	.1	.7	4.7
2025–26	UCLA	36	27	20.1	.547	.433	.675	3.5	.8	.2	1.2	7.3
