= Coen Carr =

American basketball player (born 2004)

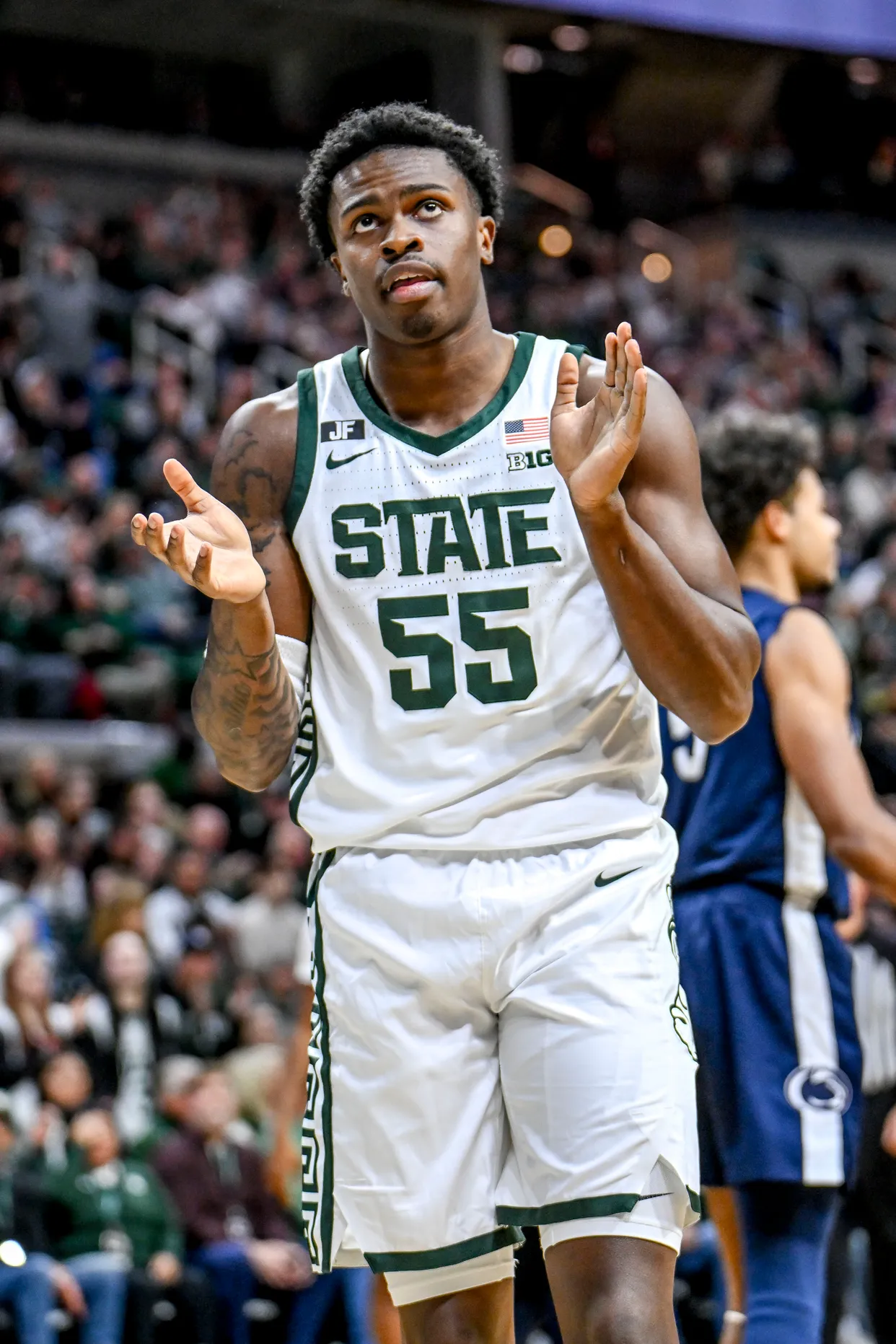
- Carr playing Penn State in January 2025.

No. 55 – Michigan State Spartans
- Position: Small forward
- League: Big Ten Conference

Personal information
- Born: October 26, 2004 (age 22) Stockbridge, Georgia, U.S.
- Listed height: 6 ft 6 in (1.98 m)
- Listed weight: 230 lb (104 kg)

Career information
- High school: Dutchtown (Hampton, Georgia); Legacy Early College (Greenville, South Carolina)
- College: Michigan State (2023–present)

Coen Evan Carr (born October 26, 2004) is an American college basketball player for the Michigan State Spartans of the Big Ten Conference. He is widely regarded as one of the best in-game dunkers in the NCAA.

== Early life and high school ==
Carr grew up in Stockbridge, Georgia and initially attended Dutchtown High School. He transferred to Legacy Early College in Greenville, South Carolina. Carr averaged 14.1 points per game in National Interscholastic Basketball Conference (NIBC) play as a junior. He was rated a four-star recruit and committed to play college basketball at Michigan State.

== College career ==
Carr averaged 3.1 points and 1.8 rebounds per game as a freshman with the Michigan State Spartans. Although he saw limited playing time, he gained attention due to his dunking ability. Carr entered his sophomore year with an expanded role off the bench. During his sophomore season, Carr appeared in all 37 Spartan basketball games and averaged 8.1 points and 3.6 rebounds per game, placing him at fourth place in both categories for the team.

== National team career ==
Carr represented the United States at the 2022 FIBA 3x3 Under-18 World Cup in Hungary. He was teammates with Brandon Gardner, Eric Dailey Jr. and Myles Colvin, with the team finishing in 11th place.
