= Phat Phat Brooks =

American basketball player (born 2006)

No. 10 – Central Michigan Chippewas
- Position: Shooting guard
- Conference: Mid-American Conference

Personal information
- Born: January 27, 2006 (age 20)
- Listed height: 6 ft 3 in (1.91 m)
- Listed weight: 205 lb (93 kg)

Career information
- High school: Catholic Central (Grand Rapids, Michigan)
- College: Michigan (2024–2025); Central Michigan (2025–present)

Career highlights
- Mr. Basketball of Michigan (2024)

Durral "Phat Phat" Brooks, formerly "Fat Fat" (born January 27, 2006) is an American college basketball player for Central Michigan (henceforth CMU). He previously played for the Michigan Wolverines on the 2024–25 team that won the 2025 Big Ten men's basketball tournament and reached the sweet sixteen round of the 2025 NCAA Division I men's basketball tournament. He was 2024 Mr. Basketball of Michigan and a 2021 Michigan High School Athletic Association (MHSAA) Division 4 champion as well as 2022 MHSAA runner-up for Catholic Central High School of Grand Rapids, Michigan.

== Early life and high school ==
The nickname Phat Phat arose at age 1 because he was a chubby kid. The nickname was originally spelled Fat Fat, but by changing the spelling of the name it took on the slang meaning, excellent. Freshman Brooks was a member of the 2021 Catholic Central High School MHSAA Division 4 boy's basketball championship team. In the championship game againts Pennfield Senior High School, that team was led by Kaden Brown (2023 MHSAA Division 2 player of the year) with 25 or 28 points, depending on the source, and Jack Karasinski (4th in the 2022 Mr.Basketball of Michigan voting) with 18 points. Brooks posted 10 points, 11 rebounds and five assists in the championship game. The team included his junior class brother Jorden, who contributed 10 points in the championship game to help the team finish 20–0. Other brothers include Jaeceon and Kenyon. Despite the other talented players who came through the Catholic Central program, Phat Phat set the program record for career points and steals.

During Brooks' sophomore season, Central Catholic lost only one game during the season (to Beacher) before losing the 2022 MHSAA Division 2 championship game in overtime to Williamston High School after Karasinski fouled out. Brooks posted nine points and nine rebounds. The team finished with a 25–2 record. The team forced overtime against unbeaten Williamston after trailing by 17 points with 9 minutes left.

By May 16, 2023, Brooks had given his verbal commitment to Michigan after visits to Michigan, Butler, Michigan State and Dayton. On November 8, 2023, Brooks signed a National Letter of Intent with Michigan basketball. On March 11, Brooks was named the 2024 Mr. Basketball of Michigan honoree. At the time of his signing for Juwan Howard, he was considered the 13th best point guard in the national class of 2024 and the best player in the state of Michigan's 2024 class. He joined a signing class with Christian Anderson Jr. Brooks missed 5 games his senior year to a knee injury. By the time Howard was replaced by Dusty May, Brooks was listed as the 194th ranked player in the national class of 2024 and he commited to stay with Michigan. By the conclusion of the class of 2024 evaluation, he was ranked No. 207 nationally and No. 2 in Michigan by 247sports.com

== College career ==
=== Michigan ===
Brooks missed the first five or six weeks of summer training when he arrived on campus due to his knee injury. Although Brooks played in most of Michigan's early season games for the 2024–25 team, often as a defensive specialist, he did not make any appearances between December 29 and March 2. He was part of a trio of Freshman guards (along with LJ Cason and Justin Pippen) that saw little action. On the final day of the regular season, March 9, in a Michigan–Michigan State rivalry game against the the Spartans at Breslin Center on senior day late in the game that would be a 79–62 Michigan loss, as Spartan seniors were being subbed out of the game and kissing the logo on the court per tradition, L.J. Cason and Brooks stood on the logo. Tre Holloman took exception to them standing where the Spartan seniors wanted to kiss the logo and shoved Cason. This led to technical fouls against Holloman and Cason. Brooks claims he was just standing at half court while a team mate shot free throws. After playing 48 minutes over 15 games as a freshman, he became the fifth Wolverine to enter the NCAA transfer portal on April 9, 2025. He had found himself behind Tre Donaldson, Cason and Pippen on the Michigan depth chart for point guard minutes. Most of the guard playing time went to Donaldson, Roddy Gayle Jr., Nimari Burnett and Rubin Jones. Thus, he only averaged 0.8 points and 0.7 assists in 3.6 minutes per game. Incoming talent included Trey McKenney and Elliot Cadeau.

=== Central Michigan ===
On April 14, CMU hired Andy Bronkema, who had won the 2018 NCAA Division II men's basketball tournament with the Ferris State Bulldogs. Brooks then commited to CMU on May 9. Then, brother Jorden, who had spent three seasons at Ferris State University, decided to follow his coach and join his brother at CMU, reuniting brothers who had played for two seasons together in high school, while compiling a 45–2 record and reaching the state championship game in back-to-back seasons. Both Brooks brothers signed on May 20. Brooks is the first former Mr. Basketball of Michigan to ever play for CMU. As a sophomore at CMU, he twice posted 20-point outings (both against Kent State): On January 10, 2026 in a 87–85 win at home and a February 24 83–81 loss on the road in which he also posted 7 assists as well as 2 steals. On February 3, he posted a 12-point/11-rebound double-double along with 6 rebounds in a 95–89 loss to UMass.

His junior season began with multiple career highs in early November games. In the second game of the season against NCAA Division III Alma College on November 6, he posted a game-high career high of 21 points in 22 minutes. He followed this up with a game-high career high of 22 points on November 10 against Youngstown State. Then, on November 14, Brooks posted a third consecutive career-high point total with a game-high 27 points (including a career high 10 free throws) and 4 steals against Northern Kentucky.
