= Michigan–Michigan State men's basketball rivalry =

American college basketball rivalry

- Michigan Wolverines Michigan State Spartans
- Sport: Basketball
- First meeting: January 9, 1909; Michigan Agricultural 24, Michigan 16
- Latest meeting: March 8, 2026; Michigan 90, Michigan State 80
- Next meeting: February 13, 2027 (Ann Arbor, MI)

Statistics
- Total meetings: 198
- All-time series: Michigan leads, 99–92* (7 Michigan wins vacated)
- Largest victory: Michigan State, 114–63 (2000)
- Longest win streak: Michigan, 12 (1921–27)
- Current win streak: Michigan, 2 (2026–present)

Locations of Michigan and Michigan State

The Michigan–Michigan State men's basketball rivalry is a college basketball rivalry between the Michigan Wolverines and Michigan State Spartans that is part of the larger intrastate rivalry between the University of Michigan and Michigan State University. The athletic rivalry includes the Paul Bunyan Trophy game in football and the ice hockey rivalry, but extends to almost every sport, as well as many other endeavors and forms of achievement. Both teams are members of the Big Ten Conference.

The rivalry has been evidenced both on the court and off the court. Among the off the court elements of the rivalry, recruiting of basketball talent has resulted in battles, the most notable of which turned into the University of Michigan basketball scandal, the investigation of which began when both schools sought the services of Mateen Cleaves. Michigan leads the all-time series; however, Michigan State leads the series since joining the Big Ten in 1950.

== Series history ==
Michigan currently leads the series, which began on January 9, 1909. However, Michigan State currently leads the series since joining the Big Ten in 1950. As a result of the Big Ten moving to 11 teams with the addition of Penn State, teams were not guaranteed two games against each other. Accordingly, the schools chose to play one game that did not count as a conference game in 1997. When the Big Ten went to a 20-game conference schedule in 2018–19, the conference announced that the teams would always play each other twice in each season.

A 1996 rollover accident during Michigan's recruitment of Mateen Cleaves led to a long investigation surrounding the University of Michigan basketball scandal. Cleaves eventually matriculated at Michigan State.

"Do I respect John Beilein? Tremendously. Do I respect Michigan? Tremendously. Do I like them? Not one bit. I don't like anything about Michigan and they don't like anything about us, and that's the way it should be."

— Tom Izzo

Despite the intense rivalry for basketball recruits and resources and the intensity of the rivalry in other sports, the rivalry had not been intense (as measured by rankings) on the basketball court until the 2010s.

On January 27, 2011, the Wolverines were 10–9 and 1–6 in the Big Ten on the season. Dating back to the second meeting of the 1997–98 season, Michigan State had won 18 of 21 meetings between the team up to that date, and had not lost in East Lansing to their rivals in 14 years. With 21 seconds left and the Wolverines up two, Michigan guard Stu Douglass made a three-point shot to put his side up five and consequently cement a win; the final score was 61–57. Despite both teams ultimately finishing the season unranked, both teams would make the tournament, and this game would help serve to launch the rivalry into this new era of intensity (and Michigan, as a program, into a new sustained run of success).

On February 12, 2013, for the first time in the series' 170-game history, dating back to 1909, the teams met while both were ranked in the Top 10. The Spartans (20–4, 9–2 Big Ten) were ranked No. 8 in both the AP Top 25 Poll and USA Today Coaches Poll, while the Wolverines (21–3, 8–3 Big Ten) came in ranked No. 4 in the AP poll and No. 5 in the coaches poll. Michigan State won the game at the Breslin Center, 75–52. The following month, both teams were once again ranked in the Top 10, this time Michigan was on the winning end of a game played at the Crisler Center, by a score of 58–57.

Indiana Mr. Basketball for 2012, Gary Harris, and 2013 Indiana Mr. Basketball Zak Irvin were teammates at Hamilton Southeastern High School, but Irvin signed with Michigan after Harris had joined Michigan State. The two were best friends from third grade through high school and even wagered on the January 17, 2012, game in high school after the two had committed to different basketball programs, with Harris having to wear Maize and Blue for a day as a result.

At the time of the first 2013–14 Big Ten season matchup of the teams, Sporting News's Bill Bender felt the rivalry was the best in the Big Ten largely due to the teams' excellence in the prior three seasons. With Michigan State riding an 11-game winning streak, including seven in conference, and Michigan riding an eight-game winning streak, including six in conference, the January 25 game marked the first time in Big Ten history that two teams have met when both teams were 6–0 or better in conference play. (#21/#25T) Michigan defeated the (#3/#3) Spartans 80–75. It was the first time Michigan ever defeated three consecutive AP Poll top ten opponents and marked the first time since the 1986–87 Iowa Hawkeyes that any team has won three consecutive games against top 10 opponents. It also gave the team consecutive road wins against top five opponents after a 36-game losing streak against them.

Both teams advanced to the championship game of the 2014 Big Ten Conference tournament, marking the first time they have faced each other in any postseason tournament, and the first time they played three games against each other in one season. Michigan State won by a score of 69–55 securing the conference's automatic bid to the NCAA tournament. For the first rivalry contest of the 2014–15 Big Ten season, Michigan alum Nik Stauskas and Michigan State alum Draymond Green, the 2014 and 2012 Big Ten Conference Men's Basketball Players of the Year, respectively, had a highly publicized Twitter war of words and bet on the game.

The 2018 Mr. Basketball of Michigan finalist lineup was composed entirely of Big Ten conference recruits, including two players for Michigan and two for Michigan State. Michigan State's Foster Loyer (3,691 points) won, while Michigan's Brandon Johns (2,792) and David DeJulius (2,542) finished second and third, respectively. Marcus Bingham, an MSU recruit, was the fourth player set to attend one of the rivals.

In 2019, MSU defeated the Wolverines three times, going a perfect 3–0, the first time such a feat was achieved in the series. The second game between the two teams marked the final regular season game and decided who would share the conference championship with Purdue. Michigan State prevailed over Michigan to sweep the regular season series. In the final meeting between the team, this time in the Big Ten tournament championship, Michigan State defeated Michigan for the third time on the season, 65–60. In each of the schools three meetings in 2019, each school was ranked in the top 10 of the AP Poll.

The February 18, 2023 meeting in Ann Arbor took place less than a week after the 2023 Michigan State University shooting, with a moment of silence and displays of unity being held. The Wolverines won, 84–72.

On January 30, 2024, Michigan State defeated the Wolverines, 81–62 marking coach Tom Izzo's 700th career win as head coach for the Spartans.

On the final day of the 2024–25 regular season, March 9, at the Breslin Center on senior day late in the game that would be a 79–62 Michigan loss, as Spartans seniors were being subbed out of the game and kissing the logo on the court per Spartan senior day tradition, L.J. Cason and Phat Phat Brooks stood on the logo. Tre Holloman took exception to them standing where the Spartan seniors wanted to kiss the logo and shoved Cason. This led to technical fouls against Holloman and Cason. Brooks claims he was just standing at half court while a team mate shot free throws.

The game on January 30, 2026, at the Breslin Center, marked the highest combined-ranked match-up in the series' history, with the host Spartans ranked No. 7, and visiting Wolverines ranked No. 3. Michigan won 83–71 to snap a four-game rivalry losing streak, and a six-game losing streak in 'ranked vs. ranked' contests between the teams. Michigan won the second meeting later that season, 80–70, on March 8, which also featured both teams ranked in the top ten (Michigan No. 3 and Michigan State No. 8), marking the first regular season home/away sweep of the Spartans since 2014.

Another element of the rivalry is that Michigan (1964, 1992*, 1993*, 2018, 2026) and Michigan State (1999 and 2001) are the only two schools to have had both their hockey team and basketball team qualify for the final four of the NCAA Men's Ice Hockey Championship and NCAA Division I men's basketball tournament in the same season.

== Accomplishments by the rivals ==
The following summarizes the accomplishments of the two programs.

Team	Michigan	Michigan State
National titles	2	2
Final Four appearances	9*	10
NCAA tournament appearances	33*	39
NCAA tournament record	74–31*	78–38
Big Ten tournament titles	4*	6
Big Ten regular season titles	16	17
Consensus first-team All-Americans	11	5
Naismith Players of the Year	1	0
Big Ten Players of the Year	6	9
All-time record	1,767–1,129*	1,875–1,170
All-time winning percentage	.610*	.616

- Through April 6, 2026
- Due to violations from the University of Michigan basketball scandal, Michigan was forced to vacate 113 victories, including seven against Michigan State, as well as four NCAA Tournament appearances, two Final Four appearances, one NIT Championship and one Big Ten tournament title. See Wikipedia:WikiProject College football/Vacated victories for further details for how vacated games are recorded.

== Game results ==
=== Games with both teams ranked ===
(Rankings are from AP poll)

Date	Michigan rank	Michigan State rank	Winner	Score
February 20. 1986	7	19	Michigan State	74–59
March 1, 1990	8	14	Michigan State	78–70
January 29, 1992	15	19	Michigan	89–79
February 15, 1992	17	20	Michigan State	70–59
February 2, 1993	7	25	Michigan	73–69
February 17, 1998	22	14	Michigan State	80–75
January 17, 2012	20	9	Michigan	60–59
February 5, 2012	23	9	Michigan State	64–54
February 12, 2013	4	8	Michigan State	75–52
March 3, 2013	4	9	Michigan	58–57
January 25, 2014	21	3	Michigan	80–75
February 23, 2014	20	13	Michigan	79–70
March 16, 2014	8	22	Michigan State	69–55
March 3, 2018	15	2	Michigan	75–64
February 24, 2019	7	10	Michigan State	77–70
March 9, 2019	7	9	Michigan State	75–63
March 17, 2019	10	6	Michigan State	65–60
January 5, 2020	12	14	Michigan State	87–69
February 21, 2025	12	14	Michigan State	75–62
March 9, 2025	17	8	Michigan State	79–62
January 30, 2026	3	7	Michigan	83–71
March 8, 2026	3	8	Michigan	90–80

=== Game Results ===
Michigan victories	Michigan State victories	Tie games	Vacated wins

No.	Date	Location	Winner	Score
1	January 9, 1909	Ann Arbor, MI	Michigan State	24–16
2	February 20, 1909	East Lansing, MI	Michigan State	45–23
3	January 11, 1918	Ann Arbor, MI	Michigan	17–13
4	March 2, 1918	East Lansing, MI	Michigan	31–25
5	February 15, 1919	East Lansing, MI	Michigan	19–17
6	February 28, 1919	Ann Arbor, MI	Michigan State	33–24^{2OT}
7	January 30, 1920	Ann Arbor, MI	Michigan State	23–13
8	February 28, 1920	East Lansing, MI	Michigan State	34–27
9	February 5, 1921	Ann Arbor, MI	Michigan	37–24
10	February 22, 1921	East Lansing, MI	Michigan	17–10
11	January 6, 1922	Ann Arbor, MI	Michigan	27–26
12	February 22, 1922	East Lansing, MI	Michigan	19–17
13	January 3, 1923	Ann Arbor, MI	Michigan	33–11
14	January 20, 1923	East Lansing, MI	Michigan	29–13
15	January 11, 1924	Ann Arbor, MI	Michigan	23–19
16	February 6, 1924	East Lansing, MI	Michigan	31–20
17	December 13, 1924	Ann Arbor, MI	Michigan	26–10
18	January 16, 1926	Ann Arbor, MI	Michigan	38–15
19	December 11, 1926	Ann Arbor, MI	Michigan	34–13
20	December 10, 1927	Ann Arbor, MI	Michigan	43–23
21	December 7, 1928	Ann Arbor, MI	Michigan State	31–24
22	February 15, 1930	East Lansing, MI	Michigan State	27–26
23	December 13, 1930	Ann Arbor, MI	Michigan	32–22
24	December 21, 1931	Ann Arbor, MI	Michigan	27–5
25	February 13, 1932	East Lansing, MI	Michigan State	14–13
26	December 10, 1932	Ann Arbor, MI	Michigan State	20–17
27	February 11, 1933	East Lansing, MI	Michigan	28–16
28	December 9, 1933	Ann Arbor, MI	Michigan State	26–25
29	February 10, 1934	East Lansing, MI	Michigan State	33–26
30	December 15, 1934	Ann Arbor, MI	Michigan	31–25
31	February 9, 1935	East Lansing, MI	Michigan State	30–28
32	December 14, 1935	Ann Arbor, MI	Michigan	35–24
33	February 15, 1936	East Lansing, MI	Michigan	41–23
34	December 12, 1936	Ann Arbor, MI	Michigan	34–21
35	February 13, 1937	East Lansing, MI	Michigan	38–31
36	December 11, 1937	Ann Arbor, MI	Michigan	43–40
37	February 12, 1938	East Lansing, MI	Michigan State	41–35
38	December 10, 1938	Ann Arbor, MI	Michigan	41–34
39	February 11, 1939	East Lansing, MI	Michigan	30–25
40	December 9, 1939	Ann Arbor, MI	Michigan	33–27
41	January 20, 1940	East Lansing, MI	Michigan	32–27
42	December 7, 1940	Ann Arbor, MI	Michigan	42–14
43	February 12, 1941	East Lansing, MI	Michigan State	35–32
44	December 13, 1941	Ann Arbor, MI	Michigan	37–20
45	February 11, 1942	East Lansing, MI	Michigan State	57–34
46	December 7, 1942	Ann Arbor, MI	Michigan	36–31
47	January 4, 1943	East Lansing, MI	Michigan	29–26
48	December 1, 1945	Ann Arbor, MI	Michigan	47–39
49	January 7, 1946	East Lansing, MI	Michigan State	49–36
50	December 7, 1946	Ann Arbor, MI	Michigan	51–29
51	March 1, 1947	East Lansing, MI	Michigan	59–47
52	December 18, 1947	East Lansing, MI	Michigan State	43–38
53	March 6, 1948	Ann Arbor, MI	Michigan	69–28
54	December 4, 1948	Ann Arbor, MI	Michigan	66–33
55	January 31, 1949	East Lansing, MI	Michigan	49–38
56	December 3, 1949	East Lansing, MI	Michigan	52–49
57	February 20, 1950	Ann Arbor, MI	Michigan	70–53
58	January 20, 1951	Ann Arbor, MI	Michigan State	49–36
59	February 17, 1951	East Lansing, MI	Michigan State	43–32
60	January 19, 1952	Ann Arbor, MI	Michigan	50–36
61	March 1, 1952	East Lansing, MI	Michigan State	80–59
62	January 17, 1953	Ann Arbor, MI	Michigan State	66–64
63	March 7, 1953	East Lansing, MI	Michigan State	55–52
64	January 16, 1954	Ann Arbor, MI	Michigan	64–62
65	March 6, 1954	East Lansing, MI	Michigan State	76–61
66	January 15, 1955	East Lansing, MI	Michigan State	84–82
67	March 5, 1955	Ann Arbor, MI	Michigan State	83–68
68	February 6, 1956	East Lansing, MI	Michigan State	86–76
69	March 5, 1956	Ann Arbor, MI	Michigan State	76–75
70	January 7, 1957	East Lansing, MI	Michigan	70–69
71	March 4, 1957	Ann Arbor, MI	Michigan	81–72
72	February 17, 1958	Ann Arbor, MI	No. 19 Michigan State	79–69
73	February 14, 1959	East Lansing, MI	No. 12 Michigan State	103–91
74	January 9, 1960	East Lansing, MI	Michigan State	89–58
75	February 27, 1960	Ann Arbor, MI	Michigan	72–65
76	January 16, 1961	East Lansing, MI	Michigan State	81–69
77	February 13, 1961	Ann Arbor, MI	Michigan	78–67
78	January 20, 1962	Ann Arbor, MI	Michigan State	80–74
79	February 2, 1963	East Lansing, MI	Michigan	72–71
80	January 25, 1964	East Lansing, MI	No. 2 Michigan	91–77
81	February 1, 1964	Ann Arbor, MI	No. 2 Michigan	95–79
82	January 26, 1965	East Lansing, MI	No. 2 Michigan	103–98^{OT}
83	February 13, 1965	Ann Arbor, MI	No. 1 Michigan	98–83
84	March 7, 1966	East Lansing, MI	Michigan State	86–77
85	January 21, 1967	Ann Arbor, MI	Michigan	81–59
86	January 13, 1968	Ann Arbor, MI	Michigan State	86–81
87	February 3, 1968	East Lansing, MI	Michigan State	82–77
88	January 25, 1969	East Lansing, MI	Michigan	75–70
89	February 8, 1969	Ann Arbor, MI	Michigan State	86–82
90	January 24, 1970	East Lansing, MI	Michigan	91–88
91	March 6, 1971	Ann Arbor, MI	Michigan	88–63
92	January 8, 1972	Ann Arbor, MI	Michigan	83–75
93	March 4, 1972	East Lansing, MI	Michigan State	96–92
94	January 13, 1973	East Lansing, MI	Michigan	78–71
95	February 10, 1973	Ann Arbor, MI	Michigan	97–81
96	January 19, 1974	Ann Arbor, MI	No. 14 Michigan	84–82
97	March 9, 1974	East Lansing, MI	No. 16 Michigan	103–87
98	January 11, 1975	East Lansing, MI	Michigan State	86–78
99	February 8, 1975	Ann Arbor, MI	Michigan	96–84
100	January 17, 1976	Ann Arbor, MI	No. 16 Michigan	66–63

No.	Date	Location	Winner	Score
101	February 14, 1976	East Lansing, MI	No. 16 Michigan	81–64
102	January 15, 1977	East Lansing, MI	No. 6 Michigan	83–70
103	February 26, 1977	Ann Arbor, MI	No. 3 Michigan	69–65^{OT}
104	February 2, 1978	East Lansing, MI	Michigan	65–63
105	February 11, 1978	Ann Arbor, MI	No. 10 Michigan State	73–62
106	January 25, 1979	Ann Arbor, MI	Michigan	49–48
107	February 17, 1979	East Lansing, MI	No. 8 Michigan State	80–57
108	January 24, 1980	Ann Arbor, MI	Michigan State	59–58^{OT}
109	February 16, 1980	East Lansing, MI	Michigan State	82–74
110	February 5, 1981	Ann Arbor, MI	No. 14 Michigan	79–77^{OT}
111	February 14, 1981	East Lansing, MI	Michigan State	70–66
112	January 21, 1982	Ann Arbor, MI	Michigan State	64–62
113	February 11, 1982	East Lansing, MI	Michigan State	66–55
114	February 5, 1983	Ann Arbor, MI	Michigan State	70–65
115	February 12, 1983	East Lansing, MI	Michigan	74–67
116	February 2, 1984	East Lansing, MI	Michigan State	72–67
117	February 11, 1984	Ann Arbor, MI	Michigan	71–61
118	January 24, 1985	Ann Arbor, MI	No. 18 Michigan	86–75
119	February 23, 1985	East Lansing, MI	No. 3 Michigan	75–73
120	January 25, 1986	East Lansing, MI	Michigan State	91–79
121	February 20, 1986	Ann Arbor, MI	No. 19 Michigan State	74–59
122	January 15, 1987	Ann Arbor, MI	Michigan	74–70
123	February 15, 1987	East Lansing, MI	Michigan State	90–81
124	January 14, 1988	East Lansing, MI	No. 10 Michigan	90–72
125	February 22, 1988	Ann Arbor, MI	No. 10 Michigan	77–67
126	February 4, 1989	Ann Arbor, MI	No. 11 Michigan	82–66
127	February 27, 1989	East Lansing, MI	No. 13 Michigan	79–52
128	January 27, 1990	Ann Arbor, MI	No. 7 Michigan	65–63
129	March 1, 1990	East Lansing, MI	No. 14 Michigan State	78–70
130	January 3, 1991	East Lansing, MI	No. 25 Michigan State	85–70
131	March 9, 1991	Ann Arbor, MI	Michigan State	66–59
132	January 29, 1992	East Lansing, MI	No. 15 Michigan	89–79^{OT}
133	February 15, 1992	Ann Arbor, MI	No. 12 Michigan State	70–59
134	February 2, 1993	East Lansing, MI	No. 7 Michigan^{†}	73–69
135	March 7, 1993	Ann Arbor, MI	No. 4 Michigan^{†}	87–81^{OT}
136	January 5, 1994	Ann Arbor, MI	No. 13 Michigan	75–64
137	February 5, 1994	East Lansing, MI	No. 13 Michigan	59–51
138	January 22, 1995	Ann Arbor, MI	No. 12 Michigan State	73–71
139	February 21, 1995	East Lansing, MI	No. 9 Michigan State	67–64
140	January 13, 1996	East Lansing, MI	No. 23 Michigan^{†}	76–54
141	February 27, 1996	Ann Arbor, MI	Michigan^{†}	75–46
142	January 25, 1997	East Lansing, MI	No. 13 Michigan^{†}	74–61
143	February 1, 1997	Ann Arbor, MI	No. 16 Michigan^{†}	85–65
144	January 10, 1998	Ann Arbor, MI	No. 17 Michigan^{†}	79–69
145	February 17, 1998	East Lansing, MI	Michigan State	80–75
146	January 9, 1999	East Lansing, MI	No. 12 Michigan State	81–67
147	February 18, 1999	Ann Arbor, MI	No. 4 Michigan State	73–58
148	February 1, 2000	Ann Arbor, MI	No. 8 Michigan State	82–62
149	March 4, 2000	East Lansing, MI	No. 7 Michigan State	114–63
150	January 30, 2001	Ann Arbor, MI	No. 5 Michigan State	91–64
151	March 3, 2001	East Lansing, MI	No. 3 Michigan State	78–57
152	January 30, 2002	East Lansing, MI	Michigan State	71–44
153	January 26, 2003	Ann Arbor, MI	Michigan	60–58
154	January 17, 2004	East Lansing, MI	Michigan State	71–54
155	February 24, 2004	Ann Arbor, MI	Michigan State	72–69
156	January 27, 2005	East Lansing, MI	No. 15 Michigan State	64–53
157	February 12, 2005	Ann Arbor, MI	No. 13 Michigan State	64–49
158	January 25, 2006	Ann Arbor, MI	Michigan	72–67
159	February 18, 2006	East Lansing, MI	No. 16 Michigan State	90–71
160	February 13, 2007	East Lansing, MI	Michigan State	59–44
161	February 27, 2007	Ann Arbor, MI	Michigan	67–56
162	January 27, 2008	East Lansing, MI	No. 10 Michigan State	77–62
163	February 10, 2009	Ann Arbor, MI	No. 9 Michigan State	54–42
164	January 26, 2010	Ann Arbor, MI	No. 5 Michigan State	57–56
165	March 7, 2010	East Lansing, MI	No. 11 Michigan State	64–48
166	January 27, 2011	East Lansing, MI	Michigan	61–57
167	March 5, 2011	Ann Arbor, MI	Michigan	70–63
168	January 17, 2012	Ann Arbor, MI	No. 20 Michigan	60–59
169	February 5, 2012	East Lansing, MI	No. 9 Michigan State	64–54
170	February 12, 2013	East Lansing, MI	No. 8 Michigan State	75–52
171	March 3, 2013	Ann Arbor, MI	No. 4 Michigan	58–57
172	January 25, 2014	East Lansing, MI	No. 21 Michigan	80–75
173	February 23, 2014	Ann Arbor, MI	No. 20 Michigan	79–70
174	March 16, 2014	Indianapolis, IN	No. 22 Michigan State	69–55
175	February 1, 2015	East Lansing, MI	Michigan State	76–66^{OT}
176	February 17, 2015	Ann Arbor, MI	Michigan State	80–67
177	February 6, 2016	Ann Arbor, MI	No. 10 Michigan State	89–73
178	January 29, 2017	East Lansing, MI	Michigan State	70–62
179	February 7, 2017	Ann Arbor, MI	Michigan	86–57
180	January 13, 2018	East Lansing, MI	Michigan	82–72
181	March 3, 2018	New York, NY	No. 15 Michigan	75–64
182	February 24, 2019	Ann Arbor, MI	No. 7 Michigan State	77–70
183	March 9, 2019	East Lansing, MI	No. 10 Michigan State	75–63
184	March 17, 2019	Chicago, IL	No. 6 Michigan State	65–60
185	January 5, 2020	East Lansing, MI	No. 14 Michigan State	87–69
186	February 8, 2020	Ann Arbor, MI	Michigan	77–68
187	March 4, 2021	Ann Arbor, MI	No. 2 Michigan	69–50
188	March 7, 2021	East Lansing, MI	Michigan State	70–64
189	January 29, 2022	East Lansing, MI	No. 10 Michigan State	83–67
190	March 1, 2022	Ann Arbor, MI	Michigan	87–70
191	January 7, 2023	East Lansing, MI	Michigan State	59–53
192	February 18, 2023	Ann Arbor, MI	Michigan	84–72
193	January 30, 2024	East Lansing, MI	Michigan State	81–62
194	February 17, 2024	Ann Arbor, MI	Michigan State	73–63
195	February 21, 2025	Ann Arbor, MI	No. 14 Michigan State	75–62
196	March 9, 2025	East Lansing, MI	No. 8 Michigan State	79–62
197	January 30, 2026	East Lansing, MI	No. 3 Michigan	83–71
198	March 8, 2026	Ann Arbor, MI	No. 3 Michigan	90–80
Series: Michigan leads 99–92
† Vacated by Michigan.
