= 2024–25 Michigan Wolverines men's basketball team =

American college basketball season

2024–25 Michigan Wolverines men's basketball

Big Ten tournament champions Fort Myers Tip-Off champions

NCAA tournament, Sweet Sixteen
- Conference: Big Ten Conference

Ranking
- Coaches: No. 11
- AP: No. 10
- Record: 27–10 (14–6 Big Ten)
- Head coach: Dusty May (1st season)
- Assistant coaches: Mike Boynton (1st season); Justin Joyner (1st season); Akeem Miskdeen (1st season); Kyle Church (1st season); Drew Williamson (1st season)
- Home arena: Crisler Center

2024–25 Big Ten Conference men's basketball standings
	Conf.				Overall
Team	W		L	PCT	W		L	PCT
No. 7 Michigan State	17	–	3	.850	30	–	7	.811
No. 9 Maryland	14	–	6	.700	27	–	9	.750
No. 10 Michigan †	14	–	6	.700	27	–	10	.730
UCLA	13	–	7	.650	23	–	11	.676
No. 16 Wisconsin	13	–	7	.650	27	–	10	.730
No. 14 Purdue	13	–	7	.650	24	–	12	.667
Illinois	12	–	8	.600	22	–	13	.629
Oregon	12	–	8	.600	25	–	10	.714
Indiana	10	–	10	.500	19	–	13	.594
Ohio State	9	–	11	.450	17	–	15	.531
Rutgers	8	–	12	.400	15	–	17	.469
Minnesota	7	–	13	.350	15	–	17	.469
Northwestern	7	–	13	.350	17	–	16	.515
USC	7	–	13	.350	17	–	18	.486
Iowa	7	–	13	.350	17	–	16	.515
Nebraska	7	–	13	.350	21	–	14	.600
Penn State	6	–	14	.300	16	–	15	.516
Washington	4	–	16	.200	13	–	18	.419
† 2025 Big Ten tournament winner Rankings from AP poll

The 2024–25 Michigan Wolverines men's basketball team represented the University of Michigan during the 2024–25 NCAA Division I men's basketball season. It was the program's 109th season and its 108th consecutive year as a member of the Big Ten Conference. The Wolverines were led by first-year head coach Dusty May, and played their home games at Crisler Center in Ann Arbor, Michigan.

== Previous season ==
The Michigan Wolverines finished the 2023–24 season with an 8–24 record, 3–17 in the conference, finishing last in the Big Ten. As the No. 14 seed in the 2024 Big Ten tournament, they lost to Penn State in the first round.

== Offseason ==
On March 15, 2024, Michigan fired head coach Juwan Howard. In the subsequent days, guards George Washington III and Dug McDaniel entered the NCAA transfer portal. They were followed by center Tarris Reed and forward Youssef Khayat on March 19.

On March 23, Michigan hired former Florida Atlantic head coach Dusty May to be their next head coach. On April 4, McDaniel announced he would transfer to Kansas State. The same day, May hired former Georgia assistant Akeem Miskdeen and former Oklahoma State head coach Mike Boynton to his coaching staff. Forward Will Tschetter became the first player to announce his return to the team, and forward Terrance Williams II decided to both enter the transfer portal and declare for the 2024 NBA draft. On April 9, Youssef Khayat announced his departure for Bowling Green. On April 11, George Washington III removed his name from the transfer portal, becoming the second player to return to the team.

The same day, May hired former Saint Mary's associate head coach Justin Joyner to the coaching staff. On April 16, May hired two former assistants from Florida Atlantic, Drew Williamson and Kyle Church, to complete his coaching staff. When the NCAA expanded coaching staff limits from 3 to 5 assistants in 2023, it determined that the two additional coaches may engage in coaching activities but may not recruit off campus. On April 17, Tarris Reed announced he would transfer to the back-to-back defending national champion UConn Huskies. On April 18, May formally presented his staff with clarifying titles for Kyle Church (assistant coach/general manager) and Drew Williamson (assistant coach/director of player development), which are different from the other three assistant coaches that have no secondary title, and presenting Brandon Gilbert as special assistant to the head coach.

On April 19, high school prospect Justin Pippen gave a verbal commitment to Michigan, May's first commitment as head coach. Two hours later, Rubin Jones announced he would come to Michigan as a graduate transfer from North Texas where he had been a Conference USA All-Freshman (2021) and All-Defensive (2023) selection. He was May's first transfer portal commitment. On April 20, Michigan secured its second transfer portal commitment under May, as 7 ft 0 in (2.13 m) 2024 Ivy League tournament MVP Danny Wolf of Yale committed to the Wolverines. Wolf was ranked as the #28 overall ranked prospect in the transfer portal and was a first-team All-Ivy League selection (2024). The following day, April 21, Tre Donaldson of Auburn committed to the Wolverines, Michigan's third transfer portal acquisition. Donaldson was a four-star transfer prospect, ranked #92 overall. On April 22, Michigan received a transfer commitment from archrival Ohio State guard, Roddy Gayle Jr. He was Michigan's fourth transfer portal addition in as many days. Gayle was rated as a four-star transfer portal prospect, ranked #62 overall (number 6 shooting guard). As a high school recruit he was ranked as the #50 overall prospect (number 3 shooting guard) in the national recruiting class of 2022. That same day, four-star sophomore forward Sam Walters of Alabama became Michigan's fifth transfer portal commitment. He was a top 100 transfer prospect, ranking #98 overall.

On April 23, high school guard L.J. Cason committed to the 2024 recruiting class, giving Dusty May and Michigan seven total commitments in five days. On April 29, Vladislav Goldin, Russian born former Florida Atlantic University starting center, withdrew from the NBA draft process to join his former head coach in Ann Arbor, giving Dusty May eight new off season commitments in the month of April. Goldin was a second-team All-American Athletic Conference (2024) and third-team All-Conference USA (2023) selection, ranked as the #46 overall player in the transfer portal. On the same day, Washington III re-entered the NCAA transfer portal, eventually transferring to Richmond on May 9. On April 30, Nimari Burnett officially announced he would be staying in Ann Arbor, the second tenured Wolverine to return along with Tschetter. Burnett and Goldin were freshman year roommates and teammates as members of Texas Tech's 2020 recruiting class. Hours after Burnett's announcement, Williams II informed the team that he would transfer to USC for his final season.

On May 13, May hired Matt Aldred to work as the men's basketball strength and conditioning coach, both were assistant coaches for the 2017-18 Florida Gators. Before joining Michigan Aldred served on the staff of the Furman Paladins, and last season was the nation's first strength and conditioning coach to achieve the title "assistant head coach/director of basketball performance".

=== Departures ===
Michigan departures
Name	Number	Pos.	Height	Weight	Year	Hometown	Reason for departure
Olivier Nkamhoua	13	F	6'8"	236	GS	Helsinki, Finland	Graduated
Jaelin Llewellyn	3	G	6'2"	190	GS	Mono, Canada	Graduated
Tray Jackson	2	F	6'10"	210	GS	Detroit, Michigan	Graduated
Jackson Selvala	34	F	6'7"	230	GS	New Canaan, Connecticut	Graduated
Terrance Williams II	5	F	6'7"	225	Sr	Clinton, Maryland	Transferred to USC
Cooper Smith	45	G	6'1"	175	Jr	Kalamazoo, Michigan	Transferred to Eastern Michigan
Tarris Reed	32	C	6'10"	260	So	Branson, Missouri	Transferred to UConn
Dug McDaniel	0	G	5'11"	160	So	Fairfax, Virginia	Transferred to Kansas State
Youssef Khayat	24	F	6'9"	195	So	Beirut, Lebanon	Transferred to Bowling Green
George Washington III	40	G	6’2”	170	Fr	Dayton, Ohio	Transferred to Richmond

=== Incoming transfers ===
Michigan incoming transfers
Name	Number	Pos.	Height	Weight	Year	Hometown	Previous team
Rubin Jones	15	G	6'5"	190	GS	Houston, Texas	North Texas
Danny Wolf	1	F	7’0”	255	Jr.	Glencoe, Illinois	Yale
Tre Donaldson	3	G	6’3”	200	Jr.	Tallahassee, Florida	Auburn
Roddy Gayle Jr.	1	G	6’4”	210	Jr.	Niagara Falls, New York	Ohio State
Sam Walters	24	F	6’10”	198	So.	The Villages, Florida	Alabama
Vladislav Goldin	50	C	7’1”	240	GS	Nalchik, Russia	Florida Atlantic

=== Recruiting classes ===
==== 2024 recruiting class ====
On November 8, 2023, Michigan signed four-star guards Christian Anderson Jr. and Phat Phat Brooks to their National Letter of Intent (NLI). Brooks attended Grand Rapids Catholic Central High School and was awarded the 2024 Mr. Basketball of Michigan. Following the firing of Juwan Howard in 2024, Michigan lost top 50 ranked commit Khani Rooths on March 18, and signee Christian Anderson on March 29. On April 19, Justin Pippen, the son of Scottie Pippen, became the first high school or transfer portal commitment for Dusty May and the highest ranked high school recruit May had ever landed. Pippen was a late riser, entering the rankings in the fall of his senior year at 191 and rising to number 60 by the years end. On April 23, former Florida Atlantic signee and three star guard L.J. Cason followed May to Michigan, pledging his verbal commitment.

College recruiting
Name	Hometown	School	Height	Weight	Commit date
Phat Phat Brooks; PG	Grand Rapids, Michigan	Grand Rapids Catholic Central	6 ft 2 in (1.88 m)	180 lb (82 kg)	Nov 8, 2023
Phat Phat Brooks; PG	Recruit ratings: Rivals: 247Sports: ESPN: (81)				
Justin Pippen; CG	Chatsworth, California	Sierra Canyon	6 ft 3 in (1.91 m)	180 lb (82 kg)	Apr 19, 2024
Justin Pippen; CG	Recruit ratings: Rivals: 247Sports: ESPN: (84)				
L.J. Cason; CG	Lakeland, Florida	Victory Christian Academy	6 ft 3 in (1.91 m)	190 lb (86 kg)	Apr 23, 2024
L.J. Cason; CG	Recruit ratings: Rivals: 247Sports: ESPN:				
Overall recruit ranking: Rivals: 47 247Sports: 29
Note: In many cases, Scout, Rivals, 247Sports, On3, and ESPN may conflict in their listings of height and weight.; In these cases, the average was taken. ESPN grades are on a 100-point scale.; Sources: "Michigan 2024 Basketball Commitments". Rivals.; "2024 Team Ranking". Rivals.

==== 2025 recruiting class ====
On October 18, 2024, Michigan landed its first class of 2025 recruit, Winters Grady of Prolific Prep in Napa, California. At the time of his commitment, the four-star Tualatin, Oregon native was ranked No. 83 overall in the 2025 national class by 247Sports. On October 23, Michigan received their second commitment from New Zealand native Oscar Goodman, who was the 2023 FIBA Under-16 Asian Championship MVP and a 2024 FIBA Under-17 Basketball World Cup All-Tournament first team selection. He was rated as a top 100, four-star player by On3, but unrated by 247Sports at the time of his commitment. On November 9, the Wolverines earned their third commitment from Flint, Michigan native and five-star guard from St. Mary's Preparatory, Trey McKenney. McKenney won a gold medal and started every game with the United States national team in the 2024 FIBA Under-18 AmeriCup in Argentina. At the time of his commitment, he was ranked as the No. 16 overall player in the country by ESPN and No. 19 in 247Sports’ composite rankings. All three players officially signed their national letter of intent during the early signing period in November 2024.

On January 7, 2025, Goodman enrolled early, joining the 2024–25 Michigan basketball team midseason. After joining the team, 247Sports ranked him as the No. 101 player in the 2024 recruiting class (listed in 2024 by their service as his eligibility started with that class. He remained in the 2025 class in the other major media outlets). As a result of him graduating in November 2024, based on the New Zealand academic calendar, he would remain a member of Michigan's 2025 recruiting class. He used the season to redshirt and was limited to practice only. On January 27, McKenney was named a 2025 McDonald's All-American. He was the first Michigan signee to be selected since Moussa Diabaté, Caleb Houstan and Kobe Bufkin in 2021, and the first to play in the game since Daniel Horton in 2002 (due to the COVID-19 cancellation in 2021).

College recruiting (2025)
Name	Hometown	School	Height	Weight	Commit date
Trey McKenney; G/F	Flint, Michigan	St. Mary's Preparatory	6 ft 4 in (1.93 m)	225 lb (102 kg)	Nov 9, 2024
Trey McKenney; G/F	Recruit ratings: Rivals: 247Sports: ESPN: (90)				
Winters Grady; SF	Tualatin, Oregon	Prolific Prep	6 ft 6 in (1.98 m)	200 lb (91 kg)	Oct 18, 2024
Winters Grady; SF	Recruit ratings: Rivals: 247Sports: ESPN: (82)				
Oscar Goodman; F	Ōpunake, New Zealand	New Plymouth	6 ft 7 in (2.01 m)	225 lb (102 kg)	Oct 23, 2024
Oscar Goodman; F	Recruit ratings: Rivals: 247Sports: ESPN: (80)				
Overall recruit ranking: Rivals: 17 247Sports: 33
Note: In many cases, Scout, Rivals, 247Sports, On3, and ESPN may conflict in their listings of height and weight.; In these cases, the average was taken. ESPN grades are on a 100-point scale.; Sources: "Michigan 2025 Basketball Commitments". Rivals.; "2025 Team Ranking". Rivals.

== Roster ==
2024–25 Michigan Wolverines men's basketball team
Players
Coaches

Pos.	#	Name	Height	Weight	Year	Previous school	Hometown
F/C	1	Danny Wolf	7 ft 0 in (2.13 m)	250 lb (113 kg)	Jr	Yale	Glencoe, IL
G	2	L.J. Cason	6 ft 2 in (1.88 m)	190 lb (86 kg)	Fr	Victory Christian Academy	Lakeland, FL
G	3	Tre Donaldson	6 ft 3 in (1.91 m)	195 lb (88 kg)	Jr	Auburn	Tallahassee, FL
G	4	Nimari Burnett	6 ft 5 in (1.96 m)	200 lb (91 kg)	GS	Alabama	Chicago, IL
G	5	Howard Eisley Jr. (W)	6 ft 0 in (1.83 m)	195 lb (88 kg)	Fr	Archbishop Stepinac HS	New York, NY
G	7	Jace Howard	6 ft 7 in (2.01 m)	215 lb (98 kg)	GS	NSU University School	Miami, FL
G	8	Phat Phat Brooks	6 ft 2 in (1.88 m)	190 lb (86 kg)	Fr	Grand Rapids Catholic Central HS	Grand Rapids, MI
G	10	Justin Pippen	6 ft 3 in (1.91 m)	180 lb (82 kg)	Fr	Sierra Canyon School	Chatsworth, CA
G	11	Roddy Gayle Jr.	6 ft 5 in (1.96 m)	205 lb (93 kg)	Jr	Ohio State	Niagara Falls, NY
G	12	Charlie May (W)	6 ft 4 in (1.93 m)	190 lb (86 kg)	RS So	Central Florida	Boca Raton, FL
F	13	Harrison Hochberg (W)	6 ft 7 in (2.01 m)	220 lb (100 kg)	So	Cushing Academy	New York, NY
G	14	Ian Burns (W)	6 ft 6 in (1.98 m)	205 lb (93 kg)	Sr	New Trier HS	Winnetka, IL
G	15	Rubin Jones	6 ft 5 in (1.96 m)	190 lb (86 kg)	GS	North Texas	Houston, TX
F	24	Sam Walters	6 ft 10 in (2.08 m)	200 lb (91 kg)	So	Alabama	The Villages, FL
F	42	Will Tschetter	6 ft 8 in (2.03 m)	230 lb (104 kg)	RS Jr	Stewartville HS	Stewartville, MN
C	50	Vladislav Goldin	7 ft 1 in (2.16 m)	250 lb (113 kg)	GS	Florida Atlantic	Nalchik, Russia
F		Oscar Goodman (I) (redshirt)	6 ft 7 in (2.01 m)	225 lb (102 kg)	Fr	New Plymouth HS	Ōpunake, New Zealand

Head coach

- Dusty May – (alum: Indiana)

Assistant coach(es)

- Mike Boynton – assistant coach / defensive coordinator (South Carolina)
- Justin Joyner – assistant coach (UC Santa Barbara)
- Akeem Miskdeen – assistant coach (Queens (NC))
- Kyle Church – assistant coach / general manager (Charlotte)
- Drew Williamson – assistant coach / director of player development (Old Dominion)
- Brandon Gilbert – special assistant (Florida)
- Matt Aldred – strength and conditioning coach (Loughborough)
- KT Harrell – director of basketball operations (Auburn)

Legend

- (C) Team captain
- (S) Suspended
- (I) Ineligible
- (W) Walk-on
- Injured
- Current redshirt

Roster

== Regular season ==
=== November ===
==== Cleveland State ====
On November 4, Michigan began the season with a 101–53 victory over Cleveland State. Michigan was led by Danny Wolf with a game-high 19 points, 13 rebounds, three blocks and three steals for a double-double. Tre Donaldson had 16 points and seven assists, Will Tschetter scored 15 points, L.J. Cason had a career-high 14 points, Roddy Gayle Jr. had 13 points and Sam Walters added ten points. Michigan finished the first half on a 22–5 run and led 54–26 at halftime. Michigan shot 68.4% from the field, the second-best field goal percentage in program history, just shy of the record of 69.2% set against Alaska-Anchorage on December 30, 1986.

==== Wake Forest ====
On November 10, Michigan lost to Wake Forest 72–70 in the Deacon-Wolverine Challenge at the Greensboro Complex. The game was a neutral court matchup, despite Greensboro being 30 minutes from the Wake Forest University campus. Michigan was led by Gayle Jr. with 11 points, four rebounds and two assists, while Donaldson added ten points and a then career-high nine rebounds, and Cason added ten points.

==== TCU ====
On November 15, Michigan defeated TCU 76–64. Michigan was led by Nimari Burnett with 16 points and six rebounds, while Wolf scored 14 points and 14 rebounds, his second double-double of the season. Donaldson also added 14 points and Walters had ten points. Michigan's defense held TCU to 34 percent shooting and 26 percent from behind the three-point line, while shooting 50 percent from the field themselves.

==== Miami (Ohio) ====
On November 18, Michigan defeated Miami (OH) 94–67. Michigan was led by Burnett with a game-high 18 points, Donaldson scored 16 points, Cason added 11 points and Gayle Jr. had ten points and five assists. With eight points in the game, Vladislav Goldin scored 1,200 career points and won his 100th career game.

==== Tarleton State ====
On November 21, Michigan defeated Tarleton State 72–49. Gayle Jr. had a game-high 16 points, while Donaldson and Walters each scored 13 points and Goldin added 12 points. With three blocks during the game, Goldin reached 150 for his career. Michigan held Tarleton State to 19 points in the second half, the lowest points allowed in any half this season.

==== Virginia Tech ====
On November 25, Michigan defeated Virginia Tech 75–63 in the Beach Division semifinal of the Fort Myers Tip-Off. Michigan was led by Gayle Jr. with a game-high 20 points, four rebounds and four assists, while Tschetter scored ten points and Wolf added four points and eleven rebounds. Michigan's defense forced 19 turnovers during the game.

==== Xavier ====
On November 27, Michigan upset No. 22 Xavier in the Fort Myers Tip-Off Beach Division Championship, winning 78–53. The Wolverines finished the game on a 20–4 run over the final nine minutes, and held Xavier without a field goal in the final seven minutes of the game. Michigan was 6–1 through November. Wolf had a game-high 20 points and 14 rebounds, his third double-double of the season. Goldin had 18 points, five rebounds and two blocks, and Donaldson added 13 points and three assists. Michigan's defense forced 19 turnovers for a consecutive game in the tournament, and the offense shot 11 of 22 (50%) from three-point range.

=== December ===
==== Wisconsin ====
On December 3, Michigan opened the Big Ten Conference season on the road against undefeated (8–0) No. 11 Wisconsin, defeating the Badgers 67–64 to win their sixth consecutive game. Michigan was led by their big men Goldin and Wolf. Goldin had a game and a then career-high 24 points, five rebounds and three blocked shots. With his five rebounds, Goldin surpassed 700 in his career. Wolf scored 20 points, a team-high seven rebounds and a game-high five assists, three steals and five blocked shots; the five blocked shots being a then career-high. Michigan finished the game scoring six unanswered points, all by Goldin over the final 2:30. The game was a defensive battle, with the Wolverines shooting 39 percent from the field and 24 percent from three-point territory, while the Badgers were held to 34 percent from the field and 22 percent from three. Michigan finished the game with eleven blocked shots, their first game with more than ten blocks since November 23, 2022. The victory marked the 100th win versus Wisconsin in Michigan basketball history, improving to 100–75 in the all-time series. It was also only the fourth win in Madison (in twenty games) this millennium. The three previous Michigan teams each won the Big Ten.

==== Iowa ====
On December 7, Michigan defeated Iowa 85–83, winning a seventh consecutive game. The Wolverines were led by Goldin with a game-high 20 points and 11 rebounds, earning him his first double-double of the season and the Big Ten Player of the Week (along with the Wisconsin game). Wolf had 13 points and 14 rebounds, his fourth double-double of the season. Donaldson added a then career-high 18 points and five assists, Gayle Jr. had 17 points and five assists, and Tschetter added 13 points. Michigan gave up 19 points off 17 turnovers. The Wolverines led by as many as 11 points in the second half, and went over five and a half minutes without a field goal. Iowa used a 17–7 run to tie the game with 16 seconds remaining. Gayle Jr. scored the game-winning basket with 4.6 seconds remaining in the game, after the Hawkeyes were called for goaltending. Michigan's seven game win streak was the longest since winning 11 consecutive games to start the 2020–21 season. Improving to 8–1, the Wolverines' matched their win total from the previous season, 8–24.

==== Arkansas ====
On December 9, Michigan was ranked No. 14 in the AP poll. It marked the first time the Wolverines were ranked in the AP poll since November 14, 2022, and the first time inside the top 15 since November 15, 2021. Michigan was also ranked No. 14 in the coaches poll, entering the poll at No. 23 the previous week. On December 10, Michigan played Arkansas in the Jimmy V Classic at Madison Square Garden in New York City, losing to the Razorbacks 89–87. Michigan opened the game leading by as many as 15 points in the first half, before Arkansas cut the lead to four at halftime. Arkansas opened the second half on a 12–0 run, as Michigan went four and a half minutes without scoring. Arkansas extended their lead to 18 points with 9:45 remaining in the game. The Razorbacks went on a 59–26 run from the middle of the first half until that point. The Wolverines answered with a 12–0 run, eventually cutting the deficit to one point in the final minute, before ultimately losing on a missed field goal attempt as time expired. Michigan had 17 turnovers during the game, including 12 in the second half. The loss snapped a seven-game winning streak for the Wolverines, and an eleven-game winning streak for Michigan at Madison Square Garden dating back to 2012. Goldin was the Wolverines' leading scorer for a third consecutive game, totaling 17 points, nine rebounds and two blocks. Wolf scored 14 points, nine rebounds, and a career-high nine assists, just missing a triple-double. Gayle Jr. and Tschetter each added 13 points, and Burnett added ten points.

==== Oklahoma ====
On December 18, No. 24 Michigan lost to undefeated No. 14 Oklahoma 87–86 in the Jumpman Invitational at the Spectrum Center in Charlotte, North Carolina. The Wolverines lost the game on a four-point play with 11.5 seconds remaining, fouling Oklahoma's leading scorer, Jeremiah Fears, on a made three-point shot. Michigan was unable to respond, missing a three-point field goal as time expired. Michigan led the Sooners 43–38 at halftime, and led by 11 points with under ten minutes to play before Oklahoma went on a 21–4 run, and finished the game scoring 30 points in that time. In total, the Wolverines shot (4 of 28) on three-point shots versus the Sooners (12 of 25). Goldin was Michigan's leading scorer for a fourth straight game, finishing with a then career-high 26 points, ten rebounds and two blocks; his second double-double of the season. Wolf had 15 points, ten rebounds and five assists; his fifth double-double of the season. Gayle Jr. scored 15 points and Donaldson added 14 points and two steals. Michigan finished 2–3 in neutral court games, losing all three by a total of five points.

==== Purdue–Fort Wayne ====
On December 22, No. 24 Michigan defeated Purdue–Fort Wayne 89–58. The Wolverines were led by Donaldson with 16 points, six rebounds and three assists. Four others scored in double figures, with Goldin tallying 13 points, Gayle Jr. adding 12 points, and Justin Pippen and Burnett each scoring ten points. True freshman Pippen set new career-highs in points (10), rebounds (four), three-point field goals (two) and assists (two). Michigan's 54 points in the first half tied their season-high, matching the first half against Cleveland State. In the first half, the Wolverines also set new season-highs for field goal percentage (77.8%) and three-point percentage (75%), shooting (9 of 12) on three-point attempts. Michigan finished the game shooting 62.7 percent from the field, including (10 of 22) from three.

==== Western Kentucky ====
On December 29, Michigan defeated Western Kentucky 112–64, and finished the regular season 8–3 against non-conference opponents. Michigan was led by Burnett and Goldin with 17 points each, while Walters tied his season-high with 13 points and Gayle Jr. had 11 points. Donaldson scored 12 points and a career-high 11 rebounds, collecting his first career double-double. Wolf also scored 12 points and had ten rebounds, earning his sixth double-double of the season. Michigan led 59–31 at halftime, shooting 57.6% from the floor and 11 of 21 from three-point range, making it their highest scoring half of the season. Michigan tied a program record with 19 made three-point field goals. Michigan's 112 points were also the most points they scored since scoring 110 points against Houston Baptist on November 22, 2019.

=== January ===
==== USC ====
On January 4, Michigan resumed Big Ten conference play against USC in Los Angeles. It was the first meeting between the two teams since 1981, with the only other matchup being in 1947. The Wolverines defeated the Trojans 85–74, improving to 3–0 in the conference. Michigan was led by Wolf with a game-high 21 points, 13 rebounds, seven assists and a career-high six blocks; his seventh double-double of the season. Burnett and Donaldson each had 16 points, Gayle Jr. added 12 points and Goldin had 11 points. The Wolverines recorded 13 made field goals in the first half, ten from three-point range, and led 42–38 at halftime. Michigan shot 62.5 percent (10-of-16) from three-point range in the first half, as Burnett and Donaldson combined to shoot 7-of-8 from three. Michigan went 0-for-8 from behind the arc in the second half. Michigan opened the second half on a 13–0 run, taking a 55–40 lead at 16:02. USC then went on a 13–2 run to take a 65–63 lead with 7:33 remaining; the Trojans first lead in the second half. Michigan in turn went on a 9–0 run to go up 73–65 with 5:09 to play, and USC answered with a 6–0 run to get within two points, but Michigan finished the game on a 10–0 run to secure the victory.

==== UCLA ====
On January 7, No. 24 Michigan remained in Los Angeles against No. 22 UCLA, their fourth ranked opponent of the season and the second top 25 matchup. The Wolverines defeated the Bruins 94–75, remaining undefeated both on the road and in the conference. Michigan was led by Goldin with a career-high 36 points and seven rebounds. It was the most points scored by a Wolverine since Daniel Horton posted 39 on February 21, 2006. Against the four ranked teams Michigan played to date, Goldin averaged 26.0 points, 7.0 rebounds, 2.25 blocks and shot 70.9 percent from the floor. In doing so, he became the first NCAA division 1 player in the last 25 years to average over 25.0 points and shoot at least 70 percent from the field in a four-game span against ranked opponents. Donaldson also had a then career-high 20 points, six rebounds and seven assists, making a career-high (6-of-10) three-point shots. Burnett added 17 points and Wolf had 12 points. Gayle Jr. missed the game with a knee injury and Rubin Jones started in his place, marking the first time the Wolverines had a different starting five all season. Michigan shot 61.5 percent from the field, including (15 of 28) on three-point attempts. The Wolverines led by as many as 18 points in the first half, before leading 47–37 at halftime. The Bruins opened the second half on an 18–4 run, earning their first lead of the game. Michigan responded with a 19–6 run, as UCLA went over seven minutes without a field goal. The 94 points scored on UCLA were the most the Bruins had allowed all season.

==== Washington ====
On January 12, No. 24 Michigan defeated Washington 91–75, staying unbeaten in their fifth conference game. It was the Wolverines best start to Big Ten play since the 2020–21 team. Michigan was led by Goldin with 19 points and seven rebounds, which earned him the Co-Big Ten Player of the Week (along with the UCLA game). Burnett had 16 points, making all six of his field goals, including four three-point shots. Through 16 games, he was deemed the top shooter in NCAA Division 1 basketball by Kenpom.com in “true shooting percentage,” which considers three-point shots, two-point shots and free throws, shooting 57 percent from the field, 51 percent from three-point range and 81 percent from the free throw line. Gayle Jr. scored 15 points in his return to the lineup, Walters added 12 points and Wolf had 11 points. The Wolverines led the Huskies, 48–38, at halftime and finished the game shooting 52.7 percent from the floor with (11 of 29) on three-point shots.

==== Minnesota ====
On January 16, No. 20 Michigan lost on the road to Minnesota, 84–81, in overtime. It was the Wolverines' first conference loss and first road loss of the season, and the Golden Gophers' first conference win. Michigan was led by Wolf scoring a season-high 23 points and recording team-highs with ten rebounds and seven assists; his eighth double-double of the season. Goldin had 18 points and eight rebounds, Tschetter tied his season-high with 15 points and Donaldson added 14 points. Both teams shot 45.2 percent from the floor, Michigan making (11 of 22) three-point attempts and Minnesota making (9 of 29). The Wolverines committed 13 turnovers versus six for the Golden Gophers. Michigan led 40–31 at halftime and Minnesota outscored Michigan 40–31 in the second half to go into overtime 71–71. The Wolverines went on to lose on a three-point shot made by Dawson Garcia from just inside half court as time expired.

==== Northwestern ====
On January 19, No. 20 Michigan defeated Northwestern, 80–76 in overtime, improving to 9–0 at home and 6–1 in the Big Ten. Michigan was led by Goldin with 31 points, eight rebounds and four blocks; his second career game scoring over 30 points. Burnett had 13 points, and Gayle Jr. and Donaldson each added ten points. Michigan trailed Northwestern at halftime, 35–30, shooting 29 percent from the field in the first half. With the Wolverines down 54–51 in the second half, the Wildcats leading scorer at the time, Jalen Leach, was ejected for an intentional flagrant foul on Goldin. After 19 lead changes, regulation finished with both teams tied 65–65 to go into overtime. Michigan pulled away from Northwestern and went on to win by four points, despite shooting a then season-low 36 percent from the field and (7 of 27) on three-point attempts in the game. This snapped a six-game streak of the Wolverines making ten or more three-point shots.

==== Purdue ====
On January 24, No. 21 Michigan lost 91–64 to No. 11 Purdue at Mackey Arena, falling to 3–2 against ranked opponents. The Wolverines were overwhelmed from the start of the game, never leading before going into halftime down 51–26. Michigan had a then season-low for points scored in a half and allowed a then season-high scored against them in a half, shooting (1 of 16) on three-point attempts. Michigan finished the game shooting 37 percent from the floor, (6 of 29) from three and committed a season-high 22 turnovers. The Wolverines allowed a then season-high 91 points against them, while the Boilermakers held them to a then season-low 64 points. Michigan was led by Goldin with 14 points, while Burnett, Donaldson and Gayle Jr. added 11 points each.

==== Penn State ====
On January 27, Michigan defeated Penn State 76–72, improving to 10–0 at home. Michigan was led by Donaldson with a career-high 21 points, seven assists and a career-high tying four steals. Wolf added 11 points and nine rebounds, while Burnett scored ten points. Goldin was limited in minutes due to an illness. The Wolverines and Nittany Lions were tied 35–35 at halftime. Michigan opened the second half on a 12–5 run and went on to lead 64–57 with just over seven minutes to play. Penn State answered with a 15–3 run to take a 72–67 lead with two minutes remaining. The Wolverines responded with a 9–0 run to come back and win the game, the last seven points scored by Donaldson, including hitting a three-point shot with 24 seconds left and two free throws to secure the game with four seconds remaining. Michigan forced 18 turnovers and committed a season-low nine, but were out rebounded 34 to 26, their second lowest total this season. The Wolverines finished the game shooting 48.4 percent from the floor, including (12 of 28) on three-point attempts.

=== February ===
==== Rutgers ====
On February 1, Michigan defeated Rutgers 66–63, snapping a streak of two consecutive road losses after winning their first three. Michigan was led by Wolf with 16 points, 14 rebounds, four blocks and two steals, his ninth double-double of the season. He tied Brooks Barnhizer and Julian Reese for the most double-doubles in the Big Ten. Goldin scored 14 points (surpassing 1,500 career points), and Donaldson added ten points and six assists. The Wolverines led the Scarlet Knights 32–25 at halftime, their second lowest points allowed in the first half this season. Michigan held the lead the entire second half, though never by more than single-digits; Rutgers scored a three-point shot as time expired. The Wolverines finished the game shooting 47.8 percent from the floor and (7 of 20) on three-point attempts, but lost the turnover battle 17 to 12. They limited Rutgers to 32.8 percent from the floor, including holding the Big Ten's leading scorer at the time, Ace Bailey, to ten points on (3 of 15) shooting.

==== Oregon ====
On February 5, No. 24 Michigan defeated Oregon 80–76, sweeping the four Big Ten newcomers from the Pac-12 Conference and improving to 11–0 at home. The Wolverines were led by Tschetter with a season-high 17 points off the bench and Wolf with 15 points and 12 rebounds, his Big Ten leading tenth double-double of the season. Goldin also scored 15 points, Burnett had 13 points and Donaldson added 12 points and five assists. The Wolverines led the Ducks 41–36 at halftime, courtesy of 11–0 and 8–0 runs. Michigan never trailed in the second half, but after leading by as many as 14 points with 12 minutes remaining, Michigan had the lead cut to two points with under a minute to go before Gayle Jr. secured the victory with two free throws with 8 seconds remaining. Both teams finished the game shooting 43 percent from the field, roughly 81 percent on free throws, (9 of 27) on three-point attempts and had 38 total rebounds. Michigan lost the turnover battle 15 to 12, but outscored Oregon 25 to 13 on points off turnovers.

==== Indiana ====
On February 8, No. 24 Michigan defeated Indiana 70–67, winning a fourth consecutive game and improving to 10–2 in the Big Ten, 5–2 on the road. Michigan was led by Wolf with team-highs 20 points, nine rebounds and five assists. Goldin had 18 points and eight rebounds (surpassing 800 career rebounds), while Donaldson added 18 points and three assists (reaching 250 career assists). Gayle Jr. was benched to start the game in favor of Jones, his second start of the season, and head coach Dusty May returned to his alma mater. The Wolverines led the Hoosiers 43–27 at halftime, via 11–0 and 16–1 runs. Michigan never trailed in the game, but in the second half Indiana cut the lead to 53–52 with nine and a half minutes remaining, before tying the game 59–59 at four minutes. The Wolverines pulled away down the stretch and Wolf secured the game at the free throw line, making five straight attempts and scoring the team's last seven points. The Hoosiers made a last second half court shot. Michigan finished the game shooting 44.4 percent from the field, (5 of 21) on three-point attempts, but lost the turnover battle twelve to seven and had a then season-low eight team assists.

==== Purdue ====
On February 11, No. 20 Michigan defeated No. 7 Purdue 75–73, moving into first place in the Big Ten standings and improving to 12–0 at home, 11–2 in the conference and 4–2 versus ranked opponents. It was the program's first victory against a top ten ranked team at home since defeating No. 3 Purdue on February 10, 2022. The 12 straight wins at Crisler Center also tied the Wolverines' best home record to start a season since the 2020–21 team. Michigan was led by Wolf with 15 points and nine rebounds, Gayle Jr. had 14 points and seven rebounds off the bench, while Goldin and Donaldson each scored 12 points. The Wolverines trailed the Boilermakers 37–35 at halftime, with Purdue attempting 12 more shots due to rebounds and points off turnovers, but Michigan scored the last nine points to close the half. Purdue increased their lead to 48–38, before Michigan took their second lead of the game and the first in the second half, 59–57, with five and a half minutes remaining. The two teams traded leads before Michigan went on a 12–2 run to lead 73–67 with under forty seconds remaining. Purdue answered with two three-point shots, with Wolf making two of four free throws before Purdue missed a potential game-winning last second three. The Wolverines finished the game shooting 44.6 percent from the field, (7 of 23) on three-point attempts, tied the Boilermakers in turnovers with 11, but had a season-low team assist total in consecutive games with seven.

==== Ohio State ====
On February 16, No. 20 Michigan defeated Ohio State in their rivalry game 86–83, winning a sixth consecutive game and improving to 20–5, 12–2 in the Big Ten and 6–2 on the road. Michigan was led by Goldin with 20 points and ten rebounds, his third double-double of the season. Wolf had 17 points, 11 rebounds (surpassing 600 career rebounds) and five assists, his Big Ten leading eleventh double-double. Burnett added 11 points and Gayle Jr. had nine points and a season-high eight rebounds against his former team. The Wolverines led the Buckeyes 44–39 at halftime. Michigan opened the second half 7-for-10 from the field, including Donaldson scoring six points on three consecutive field goals. After 16 total lead changes, Ohio State tied the game, 80–80, with just over two minutes remaining before Michigan pulled away down the stretch. The Wolverines shot 48.5 percent from the floor, (7 of 21) from three-point range, out rebounded the Buckeyes 46 to 31, but lost the turnover battle 12 to nine.

==== Michigan State ====
On February 21, No. 12 Michigan lost to No. 14 Michigan State in their in-state rivalry game 75–62, falling a half game back of the Spartans to second place in the Big Ten, snapping a six-game win streak and losing their first game at home (12–1). It marked the first time the two teams met ranked inside the top 15 since January 5, 2020, with both teams ranked the same in each matchup. Michigan State opened the game leading 16–8 with just under 13 minutes to play before Michigan used a 15–0 run (30–18 run to end the half), giving the Wolverines a 38–34 halftime lead over the Spartans. Michigan State opened the second half on a 28–13 run to lead 62–51 with just under eight minutes remaining. Michigan answered with a 8–0 run before Michigan State ultimately pulled away, finishing the game on a 9–0 run, as the Wolverines were held scoreless for the final four minutes of the game. Michigan's 62 points were a then season-low and the 24 points scored in the second half were a season-low. The Wolverines were led by Goldin with 21 points, Burnett scored 12 points and Wolf added 11 points, seven rebounds and eight assists. Michigan finished the game shooting 46 percent from the field, (5 of 21) from three-point territory, were out rebounded 34 to a season-low 25 (14 to 7 on offensive rebounds), and lost the turnover battle 14 to 11. Before the game, Dusty May agreed to a contract extension with the university.

==== Nebraska ====
On February 24, No. 15 Michigan defeated Nebraska 49–46, moving into a tie with Michigan State atop the Big Ten standings at 13–3 and improving to 7–2 on the road. Michigan was led by Gayle Jr. with 12 points and five rebounds, Donaldson had 11 points, eight rebounds and four assists, and Wolf added ten points and ten rebounds, his twelfth double-double of the season. The Wolverines led the Cornhuskers 25–21 at halftime, their lowest points allowed and second lowest scored in the first half this season. The 49 total points scored were also a season-low, as well as the 46 points allowed. It was Michigan's first win scoring under 50 points since February 23, 2008, when they defeated Illinois 49–43. It was also only the third time in 11 years a team won a Big Ten game scoring under 50 points. Michigan finished the game shooting a season-low 29.5 percent from the field, 5-of-27 on three-point shots, lost the turnover battle 14 to 11, but held Nebraska to their worst shooting performance since 2019 (25.8%).

==== Rutgers ====
On February 27, No. 15 Michigan defeated Rutgers 84–82, remaining in first place in the Big Ten with Michigan State at 14–3 and improving to 13–1 at home. Michigan was led by Goldin with 22 points and 11 rebounds, his fourth double-double of the season. Burnett scored a season-high 20 points and surpassed the career milestones of 300 rebounds and 150 assists, Tschetter had 16 points off the bench, and Wolf added ten points and eight rebounds. The Wolverines trailed the Scarlet Knights 57–49 at halftime, allowing a season-high for points scored against them in the first half (11 more points than in their entire last game), giving up eight made threes on 67.7 percent shooting from the floor. Michigan's 49 first half points were the most they scored in a Big Ten game this season, tying their total from the previous game. Trailing 74–62 with just over 11 minutes to go in the game, the Wolverines went on a 14–2 run to tie the game 76–76 with four and a half minutes remaining. Rutgers made only two of their final 18 field goal attempts, including a four-minute scoring drought. After the Wolverines went down by one point on two made free throws by Tyson Acuff with 12.2 seconds remaining, Burnett made a deep game-winning three-point shot as time expired. Michigan finished the game shooting 53.7 percent from the floor, 5-of-21 on three-point attempts, lost the turnover battle 14 to eight, but out rebounded Rutgers 38 to 27, and limited them to 25 percent shooting and 1-of-10 on three-point shots in the second half (-42.7% difference from the first half).

=== March ===
==== Illinois ====
On March 2, No. 15 Michigan lost to Illinois 73–93, losing nine consecutive games in the series, dropping a full game back of the Spartans to second place in the Big Ten at 14–4, and to 13–2 at home on senior day. The Wolverines trailed the Fighting Illini 31–30 at halftime. After tying the game 41–41 with 16 minutes remaining, Illinois went on an 8–0 run, and ultimately ended the game on a 52–32 run. Michigan allowed a season-high 62 points in the second half, the most in any half this season. The 93 total points allowed were also a season-high. Goldin was the only Michigan player to score in double figures, recording 22 points and seven rebounds. The Wolverines finished the game shooting 45.9 percent from the floor, 4-of-18 on three-point attempts, lost the turnover battle 11 to nine, allowed 14 made threes, and were out rebounded 43 to 32; including giving up 19 offensive rebounds and 30 second-chance points.

==== Maryland ====
On March 5, No. 17 Michigan lost to No. 13 Maryland 71–65, losing three of the final four home games of the season to finish 13–3, dropping to 14–5 in the conference and 4–4 against ranked opponents. The Wolverines trailed the Terrapins 33–22 at halftime, their lowest points scored in any half in the regular season. Maryland ended the first half on a 26–8 run after an early lead. In the second half, Michigan cut the deficit to 59–57 with just under seven minutes remaining but were held scoreless for over five minutes as Maryland held on to win. The Wolverines were led by Goldin with 20 points and a career-high 15 rebounds, his fifth double-double of the season. Wolf also scored 20 points and had eight rebounds, while Donaldson added ten points and six assists. Michigan finished the game shooting 43.5 percent from the floor, 7-of-20 on three-point attempts, but lost the turnover battle 16 to eight, leading to 21 points off turnovers.

==== Michigan State ====
On March 9, No. 17 Michigan lost to No. 8 Michigan State 79–62, losing four straight games in the rivalry and three consecutive games to end the regular season. With the loss Michigan dropped to 22–9, 14–6 in the conference, tying Maryland for second place, and 7–3 in true road games. The Wolverines trailed the Spartans 50–28 at halftime, with 11 first half turnovers. Trailing 61–36 with 14 minutes remaining, Michigan went on a 14–0 run and held MSU scoreless for five minutes but were unable to cut the deficit to single-digits. The Wolverines were led by Goldin with 29 points and six rebounds, scoring over 20 points in 6-of-7 of the final games. Wolf had 18 points and 13 rebounds, his thirteenth double-double of the regular season. He finished tied for the second-most double-double's in the Big Ten with Maryland's Derik Queen, and one behind Maryland's Julian Reese. The rest of the team combined for 15 total points. Michigan finished the game shooting 36.5 percent from the floor, 3-of-24 on three-point shots, and committed 15 turnovers; tying Michigan State in the turnover battle, though Michigan won 13 to four in the second half. The 14 conference wins by May were the most in program history for a first-year head coach, including the best win percentage for a full season, topping Steve Fisher's 12–6 conference record in his first official season as head coach during the 1989–90 season.

== Postseason ==
=== Awards and honors ===
Vladislav Goldin was a first-team All-Big Ten selection by the media, and a Kareem Abdul-Jabbar Award finalist. Danny Wolf was a second-team All-Big Ten selection by the coaches and media, and a Karl Malone Award finalist.

=== Big Ten tournament ===
Michigan finished the Big Ten regular season tied with Maryland for second place, but lost the tiebreaker due to their head-to-head loss to the Terrapins and earned the No. 3 seed in the 2025 Big Ten tournament. The Wolverines received a double-bye in the tournament, taking place from March 12–16 at the Gainbridge Fieldhouse in Indianapolis, Indiana.

==== Quarterfinal ====
On March 14, No. 22 Michigan defeated No. 20 Purdue in the quarterfinal 86–68, winning their first Big Ten tournament game since 2021. After Purdue scored the first six points of the game, Michigan answered with a 12–0 run, leading for the final 37 minutes of the game; going into halftime up 40–36. The Wolverines pulled away in the second half on 65.4 percent shooting in the half. Michigan was led by Wolf with 18 points, 11 rebounds and six assists, his fourteenth double-double of the season. Goldin had 15 points and eight rebounds, Tre Donaldson scored 13 points and Roddy Gayle Jr. added 11 points. Freshman L.J. Cason had a career-high five assists. The Wolverines finished the game shooting 51.7 percent from the floor, 8-of-26 on three point attempts, had 25 team assists and a season-low six turnovers. With 23 wins on the season, Dusty May tied Steve Fisher for the second-most total wins in program history by a first-year head coach.

==== Semifinal ====
On March 15, No. 22 Michigan defeated No. 11 Maryland in the semifinal 81–80, advancing to their sixth Big Ten championship game. Michigan was led by Goldin with 25 points and ten rebounds, his sixth double-double of the season and fifth game scoring 25 points or more. Wolf had 21 points and 14 rebounds, his Big Ten leading fifteenth double-double. Donaldson scored 12 points with a career-high nine assists, including the game-winning shot, and Nimari Burnett added ten points. Rubin Jones surpassed 1,000 career points with his only field goal. The Wolverines led the Terrapins 38–34 at halftime, courtesy of a 22–11 run to end the half. Michigan opened the second half on a 11–0 run (18–0 run in combination with seven straight points to end the first half). Maryland answered with a 10–0 run and another 14–0 run to take the lead with 8:21 remaining in the game. After trading baskets over the final eight minutes, Maryland's Derik Queen made two free throws with 5.3 seconds remaining to give the Terrapins an 80–79 lead; with no timeouts remaining for Michigan. Donaldson responded and went the length of the court, scoring a left-handed layup with 0.4 seconds remaining to win the game. Michigan finished the semifinal shooting 47 percent from the floor, 7-of-18 on three-point attempts, out rebounded Maryland 47 to 18, but lost the turnover battle 19 to six. The Wolverines won their twelfth conference game by four points or fewer, the most by any team in any league in the history of college basketball.

==== Championship ====
On March 16, No. 22 Michigan defeated No. 18 Wisconsin in the Big Ten championship game 59–53, winning a fourth tournament and the first since 2018. The Wolverines improved to 25–9, 17–6 against conference opponents and 7–5 versus ranked opponents. Michigan was led by Goldin with 11 points and five rebounds, who was awarded the Most Outstanding Player of the tournament. Wolf joined Goldin on the All-Tournament team. Donaldson also had 11 points and eight assists, the second most assists in his career. The Wolverines trailed the Badgers 23–21 at halftime, their lowest points scored in any half this season. Both teams shot 17 percent in the half from three-point range on a combined 7-of-41. In the second half, after being down 38–27 with 13 minutes remaining, Michigan used two separate 7–0 runs to tie the game 45–45 with just under six minutes. The Wolverines closed the game out on a 11–2 run to secure their Big Ten title, including 6-of-6 at the free throw line for their final points. With 25 wins on the season, May tied Brian Ellerbe for the most total wins in program history by a first-year head coach. He also became the first officially recognized conference coach to win the Big Ten tournament title in their first season, with the only other being Ellerbe in Michigan's first tournament win in 1998; though that season was later vacated by the NCAA. Michigan finished as Big Ten champions one year after finishing in last place at No. 14 in the conference, an increase of 14 total conference wins.

=== NCAA tournament ===
On March 16, Michigan received an automatic bid to the 2025 NCAA tournament as the No. 5 seed in the South Region. It was their first NCAA tournament appearance since 2022.

==== First Round ====
On March 20, the Wolverines defeated No. 12 seed UC San Diego, 68–65, in the First Round in Denver, Colorado. The Wolverines improved to 26–9 and won a fourth consecutive postseason game. Michigan was led by Goldin with 14 points and seven rebounds, Donaldson had 12 points with seven rebounds, and Gayle Jr. scored 11 points. The Wolverines opened the game with a 10–0 run, leading the Tritons 41–27 at halftime. UCSD opened the second half on a 17–4 run, cutting the score to 45–44. Michigan answered with a 14–5 run, before UCSD rallied with a 16–4 run of their own to take their first lead of the game, 65–63 with 2:29 remaining. Donaldson hit a three-point shot to retake the lead and Goldin closed the game out with two free throws to secure the victory. The Wolverines finished the game shooting 42.1 percent from the floor, 9-of-27 on three-point attempts, but had 14 turnovers and made 11-of-20 of their free throw attempts during the game. With 26 wins, May became the winningest first-year head coach in program history.

==== Second Round ====
On March 22, No. 5 seed Michigan defeated No. 4 seed Texas A&M in the Second Round 91–79, earning a sixth Sweet Sixteen appearance in the last eight NCAA tournaments and winning a fifth consecutive postseason game. Michigan was led by Gayle Jr. with a season-high 26 points off the bench (4-of-6 on three-point shots), and Goldin with 23 points, 12 rebounds and three blocks; his seventh double-double of the season. Wolf added 14 points, nine rebounds and three blocks, while Cason had 11 points. After six lead changes, the Wolverines trailed the Aggies 39–35 at halftime. In the second half, Michigan went down 57–47 with just over 13 minutes remaining before rallying to take their first lead of the half at the six minute mark, 71–70, courtesy of Gayle Jr. with 12 straight team points (21 total points in the half). The Wolverines never surrendered the lead and scored 20 points in the final six minutes, ending with a 9–0 run to secure the comeback win. Michigan finished the game shooting 43.1 percent from the floor, 6-of-22 on three-point attempts, 29-of-36 on free throws, out rebounded the Aggies 48 to 39, and had only nine turnovers. No team in NCAA history has lost as many games the season before and advanced to the Sweet Sixteen the next year (since introduced in 1975).

==== Sweet Sixteen ====
On March 28, No. 5 seed Michigan was defeated by the No. 1 overall seed Auburn, 78–65, in the Sweet Sixteen in Atlanta, Georgia. The Wolverines trailed the Tigers 30–29 at halftime, before opening the second half on a 19–9 run to lead 48–39 with 12:26 remaining. Auburn then went on a 28–6 run (including 12–0 to start) to regain the lead, 67–54, before closing the game out in the final minutes. Michigan was led by Wolf with 20 points and six rebounds, leading him to a South Region all-tournament team selection. Goldin and Burnett each added ten points, and Gayle Jr. surpassed 1,000 career points by scoring seven points. The Wolverines shot 35.6 percent from the floor, 5-of-17 from three-point range, were out rebounded 48 to 33 (including giving up 19 offensive rebounds), had 15 turnovers and a season-low six team assists. Michigan finished the season 27–10 and 8–6 against ranked opponents, an increase of 19 wins from the season before.

== Schedule and results ==
Date time, TV	Rank^{#}	Opponent^{#}	Result	Record	High points	High rebounds	High assists	Site (attendance) city, state
Exhibition
October 20, 2024*; 5:00 p.m., B1G+		Oakland	W 92–48	–	15 – Tschetter	13 – Wolf	6 – Donaldson	Little Caesars Arena (4,025); Detroit, MI
October 25, 2024*; 7:30 p.m., BTN		Toledo	W 96–92	–	20 – Tied	7 – Tied	5 – Donaldson	Crisler Center (9,915); Ann Arbor, MI
Regular season
November 4, 2024*; 8:00 p.m., BTN		Cleveland State	W 101–53	1–0	19 – Wolf	13 – Wolf	7 – Donaldson	Crisler Center (10,334); Ann Arbor, MI
November 10, 2024*; 1:00 p.m., ESPN2		vs. Wake Forest; Deacon-Wolverine Challenge	L 70–72	1–1	11 – Gayle Jr.	9 – Donaldson	4 – Tied	Greensboro Complex (8,905); Greensboro, NC
November 15, 2024*; 6:00 p.m., FS1		TCU	W 76–64	2–1	16 – Burnett	14 – Wolf	4 – Wolf	Crisler Center (12,707); Ann Arbor, MI
November 18, 2024*; 6:00 p.m., BTN		Miami (OH); Fort Myers Tip-Off On-Campus Match-Up	W 94–67	3–1	18 – Burnett	9 – Wolf	5 – Gayle Jr.	Crisler Center (9,943); Ann Arbor, MI
November 21, 2024*; 8:30 p.m., BTN		Tarleton State	W 72–49	4–1	16 – Gayle Jr.	6 – Wolf	5 – Donaldson	Crisler Center (9,831); Ann Arbor, MI
November 25, 2024*; 6:00 p.m., FS1		vs. Virginia Tech; Fort Myers Tip-Off Beach Division Semifinal	W 75–63	5–1	20 – Gayle Jr.	11 – Wolf	4 – Tied	Suncoast Credit Union Arena (3,500); Fort Myers, FL
November 27, 2024*; 8:30 p.m., FS1		vs. No. 22 Xavier; Fort Myers Tip-Off Beach Division Championship	W 78–53	6–1	20 – Wolf	14 – Wolf	6 – Burnett	Suncoast Credit Union Arena (3,500); Fort Myers, FL
December 3, 2024; 9:00 p.m., Peacock		at No. 11 Wisconsin	W 67–64	7–1 (1–0)	24 – Goldin	7 – Tied	5 – Tied	Kohl Center (14,582); Madison, WI
December 7, 2024; 2:00 p.m., FS1		Iowa	W 85–83	8–1 (2–0)	20 – Goldin	14 – Wolf	5 – Tied	Crisler Center (12,290); Ann Arbor, MI
December 10, 2024*; 9:00 p.m., ESPN	No. 14	vs. Arkansas; Jimmy V Classic	L 87–89	8–2	17 – Goldin	9 – Tied	9 – Wolf	Madison Square Garden (14,846); New York, NY
December 18, 2024*; 9:00 p.m., ESPN2	No. 24	vs. No. 14 Oklahoma; Jumpman Invitational	L 86–87	8–3	26 – Goldin	10 – Tied	5 – Wolf	Spectrum Center (5,859); Charlotte, NC
December 22, 2024*; 1:00 p.m., B1G+	No. 24	Purdue Fort Wayne	W 89–58	9–3	16 – Donaldson	13 – Wolf	5 – Wolf	Crisler Center (12,707); Ann Arbor, MI
December 29, 2024*; 8:00 p.m., BTN		Western Kentucky	W 112–64	10–3	17 – Tied	11 – Donaldson	4 – Tied	Crisler Center (12,707); Ann Arbor, MI
January 4, 2025; 8:00 p.m., Fox		at USC	W 85–74	11–3 (3–0)	21 – Wolf	13 – Wolf	7 – Wolf	Galen Center (7,075); Los Angeles, CA
January 7, 2025; 10:00 p.m., Peacock	No. 24	at No. 22 UCLA	W 94–75	12–3 (4–0)	36 – Goldin	8 – Wolf	7 – Donaldson	Pauley Pavilion (11,121); Los Angeles, CA
January 12, 2025; 2:00 p.m., BTN	No. 24	Washington	W 91–75	13–3 (5–0)	19 – Goldin	8 – Wolf	6 – Donaldson	Crisler Center (12,707); Ann Arbor, MI
January 16, 2025; 7:00 p.m., FS1	No. 20	at Minnesota	L 81–84 ^{OT}	13–4 (5–1)	23 – Wolf	10 – Wolf	7 – Wolf	Williams Arena (8,877); Minneapolis, MN
January 19, 2025; 2:00 p.m., BTN	No. 20	Northwestern	W 80–76 ^{OT}	14–4 (6–1)	31 – Goldin	13 – Wolf	4 – Donaldson	Crisler Center (12,707); Ann Arbor, MI
January 24, 2025; 8:00 p.m., Fox	No. 21	at No. 11 Purdue	L 64–91	14–5 (6–2)	14 – Goldin	8 – Jones	4 – Gayle Jr.	Mackey Arena (14,876); West Lafayette, IN
January 27, 2025; 6:30 p.m., BTN		Penn State	W 76–72	15–5 (7–2)	21 – Donaldson	9 – Wolf	7 – Donaldson	Crisler Center (12,707); Ann Arbor, MI
February 1, 2025; 3:30 p.m., Fox		at Rutgers	W 66–63	16–5 (8–2)	16 – Wolf	14 – Wolf	6 – Donaldson	Jersey Mike's Arena (8,000); Piscataway, NJ
February 5, 2025; 6:30 p.m., BTN	No. 24	Oregon	W 80–76	17–5 (9–2)	17 – Tschetter	12 – Wolf	5 – Donaldson	Crisler Center (11,814); Ann Arbor, MI
February 8, 2025; 1:00 p.m., CBS	No. 24	at Indiana	W 70–67	18–5 (10–2)	20 – Wolf	9 – Wolf	5 – Wolf	Simon Skjodt Assembly Hall (17,222); Bloomington, IN
February 11, 2025; 7:00 p.m., Peacock	No. 20	No. 7 Purdue	W 75–73	19–5 (11–2)	15 – Wolf	9 – Wolf	2 – Tied	Crisler Center (12,707); Ann Arbor, MI
February 16, 2025; 1:00 p.m., CBS	No. 20	at Ohio State; Rivalry	W 86–83	20–5 (12–2)	20 – Goldin	11 – Wolf	5 – Wolf	Value City Arena (18,058); Columbus, OH
February 21, 2025; 8:00 p.m., Fox	No. 12	No. 14 Michigan State; Rivalry	L 62–75	20–6 (12–3)	21 – Goldin	7 – Wolf	8 – Wolf	Crisler Center (12,707); Ann Arbor, MI
February 24, 2025; 8:00 p.m., FS1	No. 15	at Nebraska	W 49–46	21–6 (13–3)	12 – Gayle Jr.	10 – Tied	4 – Donaldson	Pinnacle Bank Arena (15,074); Lincoln, NE
February 27, 2025; 9:00 p.m., Peacock	No. 15	Rutgers	W 84–82	22–6 (14–3)	22 – Goldin	11 – Goldin	6 – Donaldson	Crisler Center (12,053); Ann Arbor, MI
March 2, 2025; 3:45 p.m., CBS	No. 15	Illinois	L 73–93	22–7 (14–4)	22 – Goldin	7 – Goldin	2 – Tied	Crisler Center (12,707); Ann Arbor, MI
March 5, 2025; 6:30 p.m., BTN	No. 17	No. 13 Maryland	L 65–71	22–8 (14–5)	20 – Tied	15 – Goldin	6 – Donaldson	Crisler Center (11,477); Ann Arbor, MI
March 9, 2025; 12:00 p.m., CBS	No. 17	at No. 8 Michigan State; Rivalry	L 62–79	22–9 (14–6)	29 – Goldin	13 – Wolf	4 – Wolf	Breslin Center (14,797); East Lansing, MI
Big Ten tournament
March 14, 2025; 9:00 p.m., BTN	(3) No. 22	vs. (6) No. 20 Purdue; Quarterfinal	W 86–68	23–9	18 – Wolf	11 – Wolf	6 – Wolf	Gainbridge Fieldhouse (13,951); Indianapolis, IN
March 15, 2025; 3:30 p.m., CBS	(3) No. 22	vs. (2) No. 11 Maryland; Semifinal	W 81–80	24–9	25 – Goldin	14 – Wolf	9 – Donaldson	Gainbridge Fieldhouse (13,612); Indianapolis, IN
March 16, 2025; 3:30 p.m., CBS	(3) No. 22	vs. (5) No. 18 Wisconsin; Championship	W 59–53	25–9	11 – Tied	8 – Wolf	8 – Donaldson	Gainbridge Fieldhouse (13,824); Indianapolis, IN
NCAA tournament
March 20, 2025; 10:00 p.m., TBS	(5 S) No. 14	vs. (12 S) UC San Diego; First Round	W 68–65	26–9	14 – Goldin	11 – Wolf	4 – Burnett	Ball Arena (19,302); Denver, CO
March 22, 2025; 5:15 p.m., CBS	(5 S) No. 14	vs. (4 S) No. 19 Texas A&M; Second Round	W 91–79	27–9	26 – Gayle Jr.	12 – Goldin	4 – Tied	Ball Arena (19,302); Denver, CO
March 28, 2025; 9:39 p.m., CBS	(5 S) No. 14	vs. (1 S) No. 4 Auburn; Sweet Sixteen	L 65–78	27–10	20 – Wolf	9 – Goldin	2 – Burnett	State Farm Arena (16,743); Atlanta, GA
*Non-conference game. ^{#}Rankings from AP poll. (#) Tournament seedings in parentheses. S=South. All times are in Eastern Time. Source:

== Rankings ==
Ranking movements Legend: ██ Increase in ranking ██ Decrease in ranking — = Not ranked RV = Received votes
	Week																				
Poll	Pre	1	2	3	4	5	6	7	8	9	10	11	12	13	14	15	16	17	18	19	Final
AP	RV	RV	RV	—	RV	14	24	RV	RV	24	20	21	RV	24	20	12	15	17	22	14	10
Coaches	—	—	—	—	23	14	21	RV	RV	24	19	20	RV	22	17	12	13	15	21	15	11

== NBA draft picks ==
Danny Wolf was selected 27th overall in the first round of the 2025 NBA draft by the Brooklyn Nets.

Year	Round	Pick	Overall	Player	NBA club
2025	1	27	27	Danny Wolf	Brooklyn Nets
