= Tre Holloman =

American basketball player

No. 22 – Grand Canyon Antelopes
- Position: Point guard

Personal information
- Born: December 9, 2003 (age 22) Minneapolis, Minnesota, U.S.
- Listed height: 6 ft 2 in (1.88 m)
- Listed weight: 195 lb (88 kg)

Career information
- High school: Cretin-Derham Hall (Saint Paul, Minnesota)
- College: Michigan State (2022–2025); NC State (2025–2026); Grand Canyon (2026–present)

TreJuan Emmanuel Holloman (born December 9, 2003) is an American college basketball player for the Grand Canyon Antelopes of the Mountain West Conference. He previously played for the Michigan State Spartans and NC State Wolfpack.

== Early life ==
Holloman attended Cretin-Derham Hall High School in Saint Paul, Minnesota. As a junior, he averaged 20.3 points and 9.3 assists per game. As a senior, Holloman averaged 18.8 points, 10.4 assists, 8.3 rebounds and 3.3 steals in 26 games and was named the 2021 Minnesota Gatorade Player of the Year. Coming out of high school, he was rated as a four-star recruit and committed to play college basketball for the Michigan State Spartans over offers from schools such as Illinois, Oklahoma State, Minnesota, Dayton, and Marquette. He also had Division I football offers.

== College career ==
=== MSU ===
As a freshman, Holloman played in 34 games, averaging 8.6 minutes, and 1.3 points per game. On November 19, 2023, in his first collegiate start, he notched 17 points, five assists, and two steals in a victory versus Alcorn State. During the 2023-24 season, Holloman averaged 5.7 points, 1.6 rebounds and 2.4 assists per game. On November 27, 2024, he dropped 19 points in an upset win over North Carolina. On January 28, 2025, Holloman had a team-high 12 points in a win over Minnesota. On February 26, 2025, he hit a half-court buzzer beater in a 58-55 victory over Maryland. On March 9, 2025, Holloman got into an altercation with guards Durral Brooks and LJ Cason in a win over rival Michigan with a team and career-high 20 points. He averaged 9.1 points and 3.7 assists per game as a junior.

=== NCSU ===
On April 1, 2025, Holloman entered the NCAA transfer portal and ultimately transferred to NC State.

=== GCU ===
In August 2026, Holloman was granted a temporary restraining order against the NCAA and as a result granted a fifth season of eligibility after filing a lawsuit in the state of California. He entered the NCAA transfer portal. He also filed a similar lawsuit in the state of North Carolina for additional measures. On August 27, Holloman chose to play at Grand Canyon University.
