= Roddy Gayle Jr. =

American basketball player (born 2003)

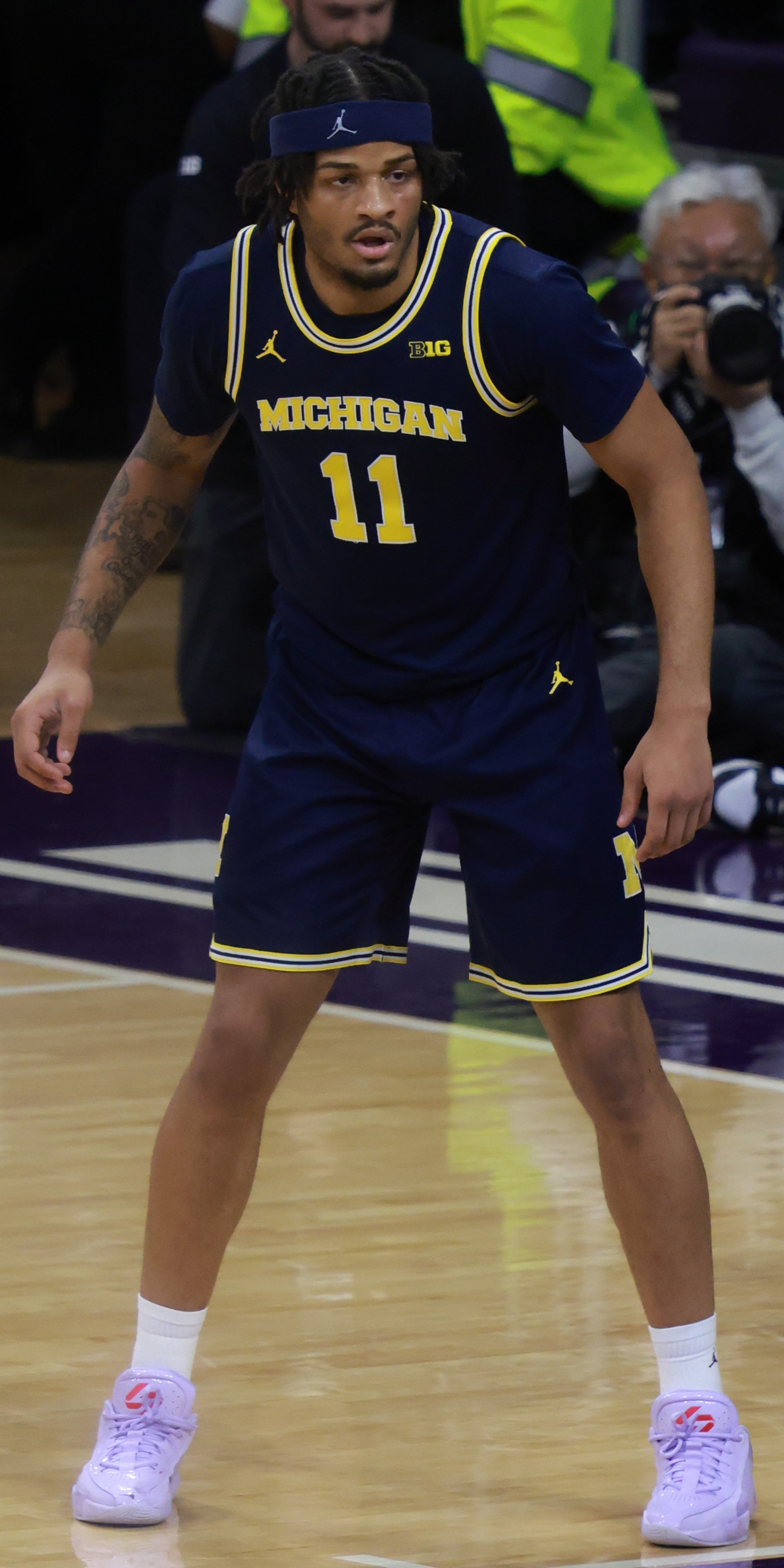
- Gayle with the 2025–26 Michigan Wolverines

No. 11 – Michigan Wolverines
- Position: Shooting guard
- League: Big Ten Conference

Personal information
- Born: July 23, 2003 (age 23) Niagara Falls, New York, U.S.
- Listed height: 6 ft 5 in (1.96 m)
- Listed weight: 205 lb (93 kg)

Career information
- High school: Lewiston–Porter (Youngstown, New York); Wasatch Academy (Mount Pleasant, Utah)
- College: Ohio State (2022–2024); Michigan (2024–present)

Career highlights
- NCAA champion (2026)

Rodriguez Gayle Jr. (born July 23, 2003) is an American college basketball player for the Michigan Wolverines of the Big Ten Conference. He previously played for the Ohio State Buckeyes. Gayle won an NCAA championship with Michigan in 2026.

== Early life ==
Gayle was born on July 23, 2003 in Niagara Falls, New York, the son of Rodriguez Gayle Sr. and Lotoya Page Gayle, and started playing basketball at age four under the guidance of his father. Despite living in Niagara Falls, he chose to attend Lewiston-Porter High School in nearby Youngstown. He attended Lewiston-Porter for two years before transferring to Wasatch Academy in Utah for his final two years of high school basketball. After his senior season ended, he opted to transfer back to Lewiston-Porter for graduation.

=== Recruiting ===
Gayle was considered a consensus four-star recruit by ESPN, 247Sports and Rivals. On November 26, 2020, Gayle committed to play college basketball for Ohio State over offers from teams such as UConn, Syracuse, and Marquette.

College recruiting
Name	Hometown	School	Height	Weight	Commit date
Roddy Gayle Jr. SG	Niagara Falls, NY	Wasatch Academy (UT)	6 ft 4 in (1.93 m)	195 lb (88 kg)	Nov 13, 2020
Roddy Gayle Jr. SG	Recruit ratings: Rivals: 247Sports: ESPN: (87)				
Overall recruit ranking:
Note: In many cases, Scout, Rivals, 247Sports, On3, and ESPN may conflict in their listings of height and weight.; In these cases, the average was taken. ESPN grades are on a 100-point scale.; Sources: "2022 Team Ranking". Rivals.

== College career ==
=== Ohio State ===
As a freshman, Gayle started 11 of 35 games for Ohio State with the 2022–23 Buckeyes, averaging 4.6 points per game. He received minimal playing time until the 2023 Big Ten tournament, assuming a larger role due to an injury to Brice Sensabaugh. In the final two games of Ohio State's season, Gayle set back–to–back career-highs in points, scoring 15 against Michigan State and 20 against Purdue.

As a sophomore, Gayle started 35 of 36 games for the 2023–24 Buckeyes, averaging 13.5 points per game, 4.6 rebounds and 3.1 assists. On December 30, 2023, he scored a career-high 32 points against West Virginia. With head coach Chris Holtmann being fired during the season, Gayle entered the NCAA transfer portal after the conclusion of the season. Gayle was popular with Ohio State fans before leaving.

=== Michigan ===
==== 2024–25 ====
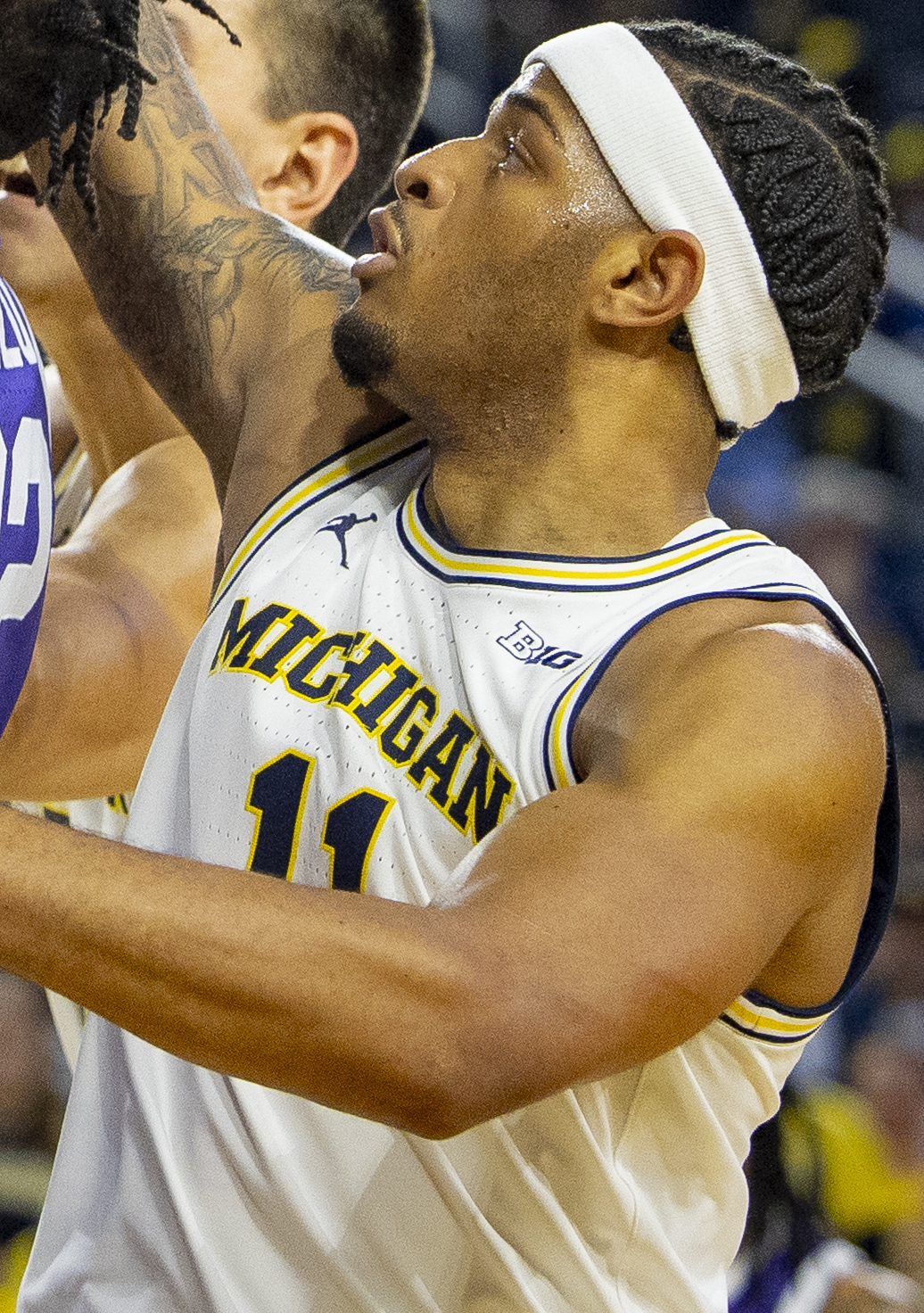
Gayle with the Michigan Wolverines in 2024

On April 22, 2024, Gayle transferred from Ohio State University to the University of Michigan, to play under new head coach Dusty May. As a junior, he started 25 games for the 2024–25 Wolverines before finding his role off the bench. Gayle helped lead Michigan to a Big Ten championship in the 2025 Big Ten tournament. On March 22, in the Second Round of the 2025 NCAA tournament against No. 4 seed Texas A&M, Gayle led Michigan in a comeback win with a season-high 26 points on 4-of-6 three-point shooting. The Wolverines rallied from down ten points in the second half, and Gayle scored 12 straight points for Michigan as they captured their first lead of the half. He would go on to score 21 of his 26 points in the half, leading the Wolverines to the Sweet Sixteen.

==== 2025–26 ====
Gayle returned for his senior season with the 2025–26 Wolverines, helping lead Michigan to one of its best seasons in program history. In the 2026 NCAA tournament, he earned the moniker 'March Roddy', based on his performance the year before, and his efforts leading Michigan to the Final Four while being named to the Midwest All-Region team. In the first four games, Gayle averaged 10.3 points, 3.8 rebounds and 1.3 blocks per game off the bench. He shot 15-of-23 from the field (65.2%) and 7-of-12 on three-point attempts (58.3%). The team won the national championship and tied the Big Ten Conference record for single-season wins, 37.

==== 2026–27 ====
On August 31, 2026, Gayle filed a lawsuit in the state of New York. He submitted that he was enrolled at the University of Michigan for the fall of 2026, had been granted a roster spot and was practicing with the team. As a result, he was granted a temporary restraining order against the NCAA and eligibility on September 2. On September 24, Gayle was granted a preliminary injunction. Gayle posted a 13 points and 8 rebounds in the November 15 game against William & Mary, contributing to the team's all-time record 75-point half and record 8 double-digit scorers.

== Professional career ==
After being automatically entered into the 2026 NBA draft, Gayle went unselected. He then agreed to play with the Detroit Pistons in the NBA Summer League with a chance to earn a two-way or standard contract, receiving a $1,700 stipend. In the Pistons' Summer League debut, Gayle made all four of his shots, including two three-point shots for 10 points. On July 12, Gayle again made all four of his shots from the field, including two three-point shots.

== College statistics ==
Legend
GP	Games played	GS	Games started	MPG	Minutes per game
FG%	Field goal percentage	3P%	3-point field goal percentage	FT%	Free throw percentage
RPG	Rebounds per game	APG	Assists per game	SPG	Steals per game
BPG	Blocks per game	PPG	Points per game	**Bold**	Career high

=== College ===
Year	Team	GP	GS	MPG	FG%	3P%	FT%	RPG	APG	SPG	BPG	PPG
2022–23	Ohio State	35	11	16.3	.440	.429	.810	1.6	0.9	0.6	0.4	4.6
2023–24	Ohio State	36	35	30.9	.449	.284	.832	4.6	3.1	0.8	0.2	13.5
2024–25	Michigan	36	25	26.3	.431	.232	.792	3.4	2.2	0.8	0.2	9.8
2025–26	Michigan	39	1	21.1	.463	.318	.750	3.3	1.3	0.7	0.5	7.3
**Career**		**146**	**72**	**23.7**	**.446**	**.301**	**.799**	**3.2**	**1.9**	**0.7**	**0.3**	**8.8**
