= L.J. Cason =

American basketball player (born 2006)

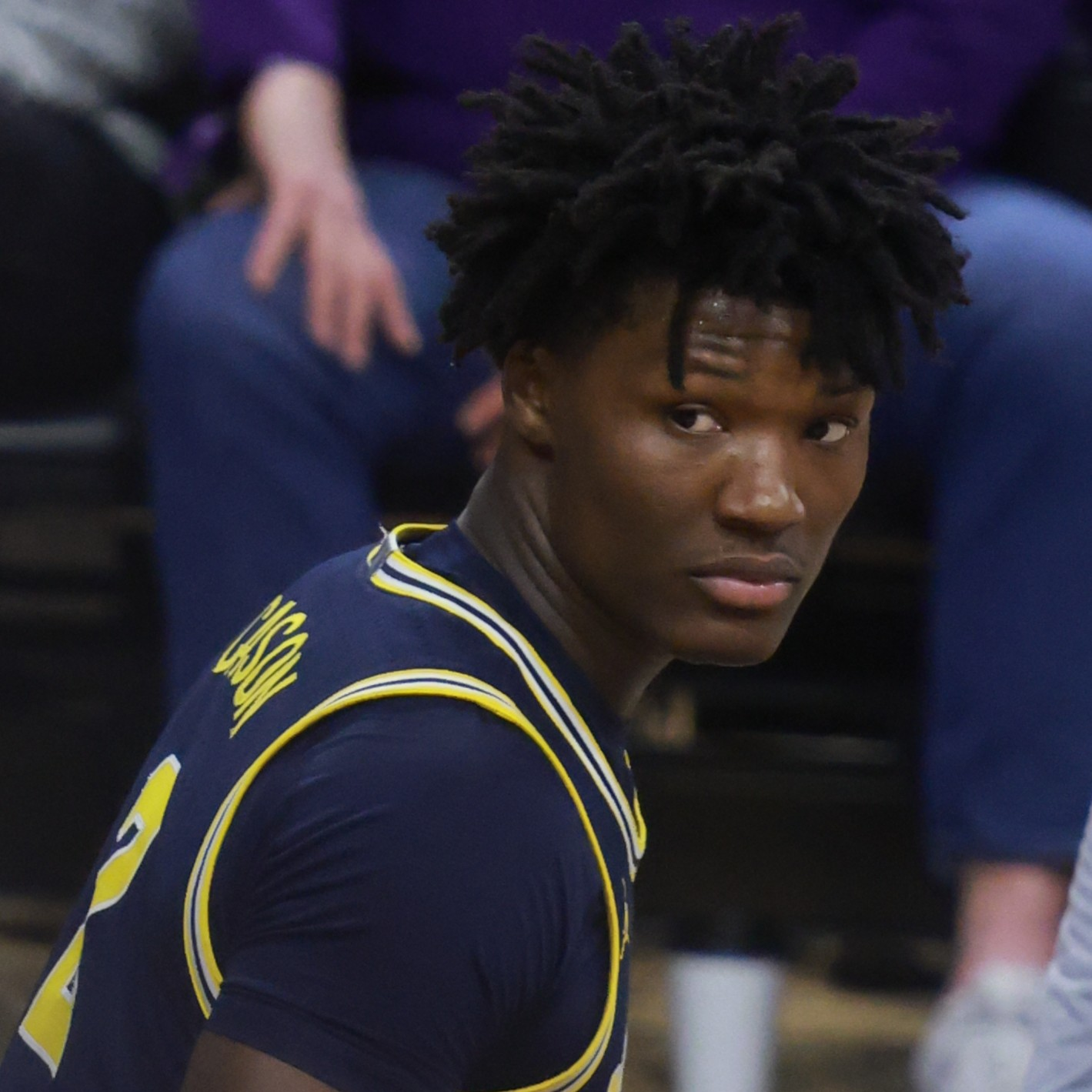
- Cason with the 2025–26 Michigan Wolverines

No. 13 – Miami Hurricanes
- Position: Point guard / shooting guard
- Conference: Atlantic Coast Conference

Personal information
- Born: May 27, 2006 (age 20)
- Listed height: 6 ft 2 in (1.88 m)
- Listed weight: 195 lb (88 kg)

Career information
- High school: Victory Christian Academy (Lakeland, Florida)
- College: Michigan (2024–2026); Miami (Florida)

Career highlights
- NCAA champion (2026)

Lorenzo Cason Jr. (born May 27, 2006) is an American college basketball player for the Miami Hurricanes of the Atlantic Coast Conference (ACC). He previously played for the Michigan Wolverines.

== Early life and high school ==
Cason attended Victory Christian Academy in Lakeland, Florida. He was rated as a three-star recruit by 247Sports and committed to play college basketball for the Florida Atlantic Owls. However, Cason flipped his commitment to play for the Michigan Wolverines, following FAU head coach Dusty May after he took the Wolverines head coaching job.

== College career ==
=== Michigan ===
In his collegiate debut on November 4, 2024, Cason scored 14 points in a victory against Cleveland State. On the final day of the regular season, March 9, in a Michigan–Michigan State rivalry game against the the Spartans at Breslin Center on senior day late in the game that would be a 79–62 Michigan loss, as Spartan seniors were being subbed out of the game and kissing the logo on the court per tradition, Cason and Phat Phat Brooks stood on the logo. Tre Holloman took exception to them standing where the Spartan seniors wanted to kiss the logo and shoved Cason. This led to technical fouls against Holloman and Cason. In the finals of the 2025 Big Ten men's basketball tournament, he scored eight points in a victory over Wisconsin. In the second round of the 2025 NCAA Division I men's basketball tournament, Cason recorded 11 points and three assists in a win versus Texas A&M. He finished the 2024–25 season, appearing in 30 games, averaging 4.3 points, 1.4 rebounds, and 1.0 assist per game.

As a sophomore, Cason notched ten points, three rebounds, and three steals in a victory over Auburn in November 2025. He matched his career-high with 14 points, leading the Wolverines in scoring against Penn State in January 2026. On February 11, Cason had career highs of 18 points (13 in the second half) and four steals, helping lead a comeback from a 16-point second half deficit against Northwestern. Cason played point guard the final 15 minutes and operated an offense that scored on 21 straight possessions. On February 27, Michigan clinched the 2026 Big Ten regular season championship outright against No. 10 Illinois. Unfortunately in that game Cason suffered a torn ACL and would miss the remainder of the season. He finished his sophomore campaign averaging 8.4 points, 1.9 rebounds, 2.4 assists and 1.0 steals per game, while shooting 50.3% from the field. By early March, he decided to postpone surgery until the end of the season and as a result will miss the entire 2026-27 season. The team earned the championship at the NCAA Tournament and tied the Big Ten Conference record for single-season wins. On July 13, 2026, Cason informed Michigan he would be the lone player to enter the NCAA transfer portal after Dusty May left to coach the Dallas Mavericks.

=== Miami ===
He transferred to play at the University of Miami and will miss his entire junior season in 2026–27.

== National team career ==
Cason was among the 33 players nominated and to tryout for the United States men's national under-19 basketball team to compete at the 2025 FIBA Under-19 Basketball World Cup along with 2025–26 Michigan teammate, Morez Johnson Jr. Cason did not survive the cut to 18 finalists for the 12-man team.
