= Dusty May =

American basketball coach (born 1976)

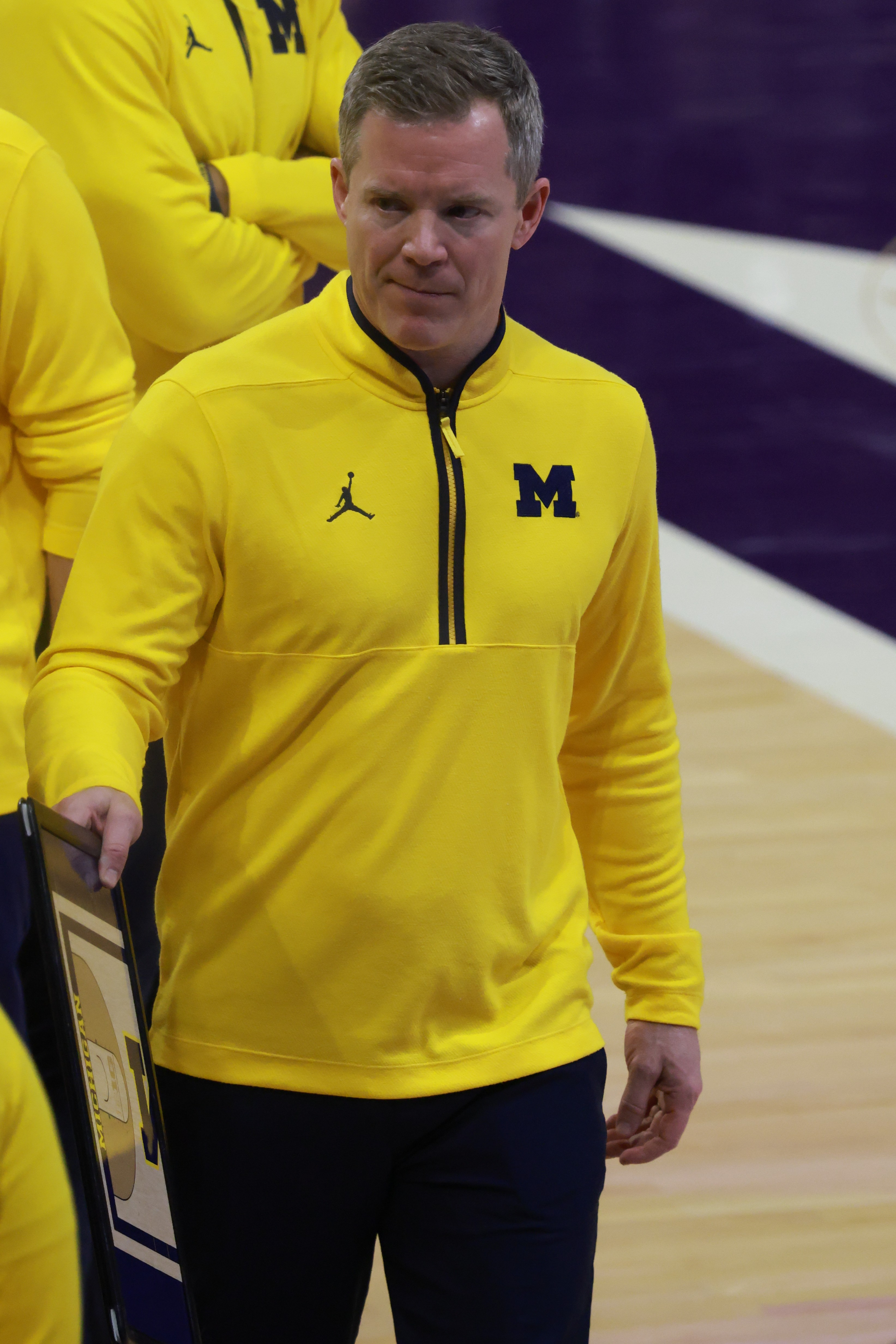
- May with the Michigan Wolverines in 2026

Dallas Mavericks
- Position: Head coach
- League: NBA

Personal information
- Born: December 30, 1976 (age 49) Terre Haute, Indiana, U.S.

Career information
- High school: Eastern Greene (Greene County, Indiana)
- College: Indiana
- Coaching career: 2005–present

Career history

Coaching
- 2005–2006: Eastern Michigan (assistant)
- 2006–2007: Murray State (assistant)
- 2007–2009: UAB (assistant)
- 2009–2015: Louisiana Tech (assistant)
- 2015–2018: Florida (assistant)
- 2018–2024: Florida Atlantic
- 2024–2026: Michigan
- 2026–present: Dallas Mavericks

Career highlights
- As head coach: NCAA Division I tournament champion (2026); 2× NCAA Division I tournament – Final Four (2023, 2026); Henry Iba Award (2026); CUSA regular season champion (2023); Big Ten regular season champion (2026); CUSA tournament champion (2023); Big Ten tournament champion (2025); CUSA Coach of the Year (2023); Big Ten Coach of the Year (2026)

Dusty Allan May (born December 30, 1976) is an American professional basketball coach who is the head coach of the Dallas Mavericks of the National Basketball Association (NBA). He was previously the head coach for Florida Atlantic University from 2018 to 2024 and the University of Michigan from 2024 to 2026, where he won the NCAA Division I National Championship and the USBWA National Coach of the Year in 2026.

== Coaching career ==
=== Early years ===
Dusty Allan May was born in Terre Haute, Indiana. After graduating from Eastern Greene High School in Bloomfield, Indiana, in 1995, May served as a student manager at Indiana University from 1996 to 2000, under legendary Hoosiers head coach Bob Knight. He also coached the Bloomington Red AAU team, which featured Sean May. After graduating, he had video and administrative roles at the University of Southern California (USC), 2000 to 2002, and at Indiana University, 2002 to 2005, and his first assistant coaching job at Eastern Michigan University in 2005. May had subsequent stops at Murray State University and the University of Alabama at Birmingham (UAB), serving under former Indiana head coach Mike Davis. After two seasons at UAB, he joined the staff at Louisiana Tech University as an assistant under Kerry Rupp and Mike White from 2009 to 2015. May followed Mike White to the University of Florida, serving as an assistant from 2015 to 2018. May compiled a 274–166 record in 13 seasons as an assistant coach.

=== Florida Atlantic University ===
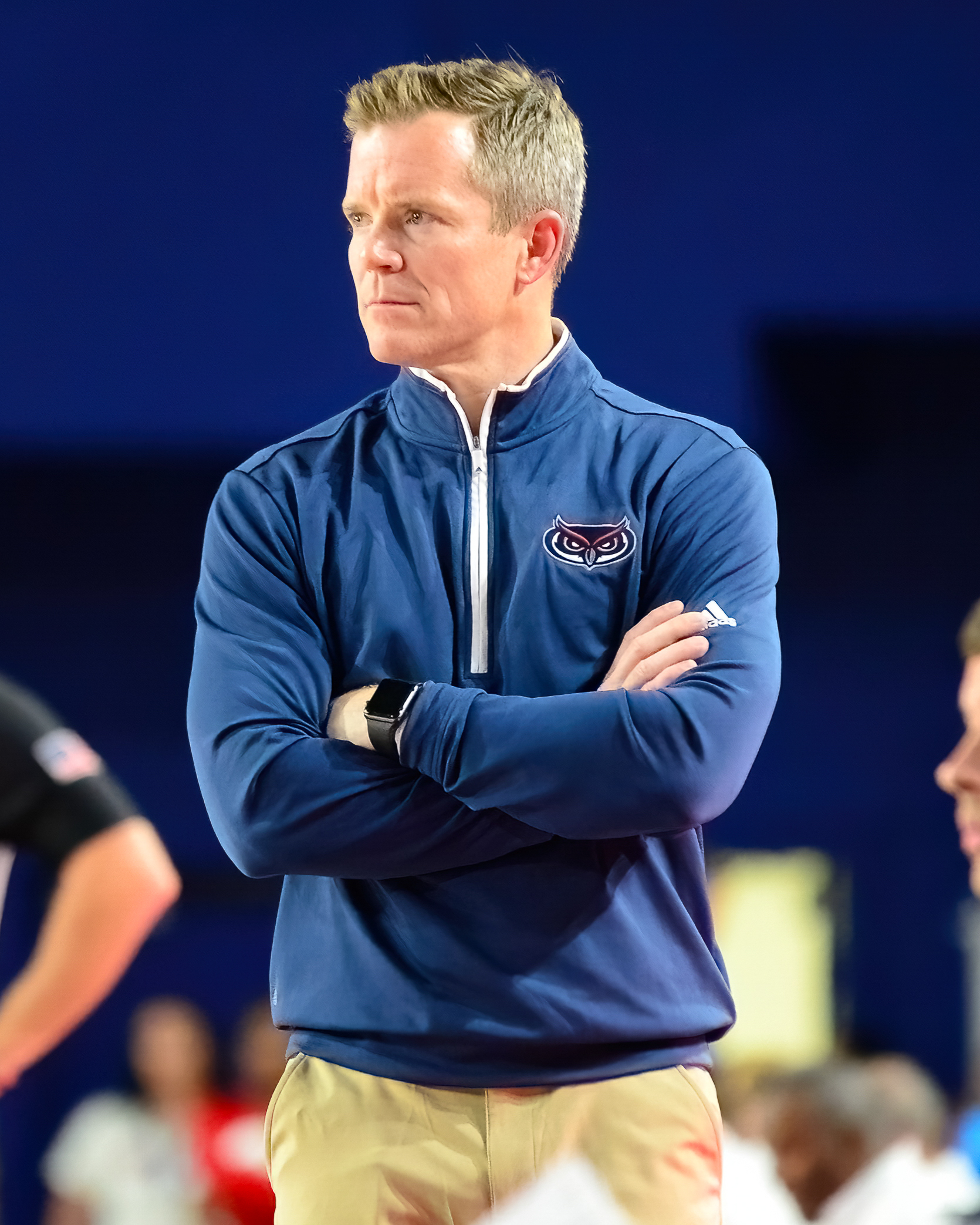
May with Florida Atlantic in November 2023

On March 22, 2018, May was hired at Florida Atlantic University (FAU) as the head coach of the Owls basketball program, replacing Michael Curry. In his first NCAA tournament in 2023, May led the No. 9 seed Owls to the school's first Final Four, with victories over No. 8 Memphis, No. 16 Fairleigh Dickinson, No. 4 Tennessee and No. 3 Kansas State, before losing to No. 5 San Diego State on a buzzer beater. The team finished the season with an NCAA Division I leading and program record, 35 wins. Their 18 wins in the Conference USA were also a league record.

The next season, he led the program back to the NCAA tournament in 2024, as a No. 8 seed, this time losing to No. 9 Northwestern in the first round. In his first tenure as a head coach, 2018 to 2024, May compiled a 126–69 record and never had a season with a losing record. He is the all-time wins leader for the program.

=== University of Michigan ===
==== 2024–25 ====
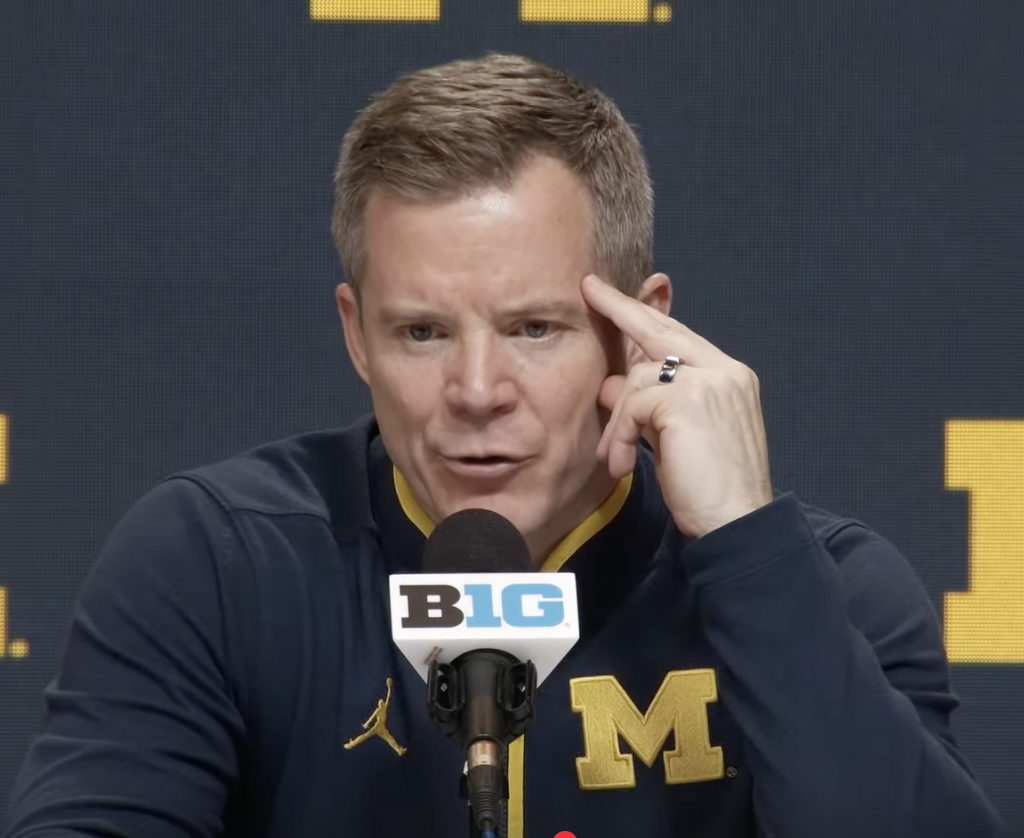
May with the Michigan Wolverines in March 2025

On March 23, 2024, May was named the 18th head basketball coach at the University of Michigan, agreeing to a five-year contract with an average value of $3.75 million annually. In his first month as head coach, May garnered seven new roster commitments in a five-day span, from April 19 to 24. On April 29, he added his eighth offseason commitment, his former center at FAU, Vladislav Goldin. Through November, the first month of the 2024-25 season, May led Michigan to a 6–1 record, including defeating No. 22 Xavier en route to being the Fort Myers Tip-Off champions.

The next two games, Michigan opened the Big Ten Conference season winning on the road against No. 11 Wisconsin and against Iowa. It was Michigan's seventh consecutive win, the longest streak since the 2020–21 Michigan team won 11 consecutive games to start the season. It was also the eighth total win, 8–1, matching the Wolverines previous season's win total; 8–24. On December 9, Michigan was ranked No. 14 in the AP poll. It marked the first time the Wolverines were ranked in the AP poll since November 14, 2022, and the first time inside the top 15 since November 15, 2021.

Through 22 games, May led Michigan to a 17–5 overall record, 9–2 in the Big Ten and 11–0 at home. Each marked the Wolverines' best record since the 2020–21 team. The next game, May returned to his alma mater with No. 24 Michigan defeating Indiana on the road. No. 20 Michigan then won against No. 7 Purdue, moving into first place in the Big Ten standings and improving to 12–0 at home, 11–2 in the conference and 4–2 versus ranked opponents. It was the program's first victory against a top ten ranked team at home since defeating No. 3 Purdue on February 10, 2022. In rivalry week, No. 20 Michigan defeated Ohio State on the road, winning their 20th game of the year (20–5), but at No. 12 in the rankings they lost their first home game of the season to No. 14 Michigan State.

On February 21, 2025, May signed a contract extension with Michigan. He received one additional year on his previous five-year contract, nearly one million dollars more per year, an increased buyout and a larger NIL investment in the program. Michigan won their next two games and sat in first place in the Big Ten, but lost the final three games of the regular season, including a second loss to Michigan State in the finale. They finished 22–9 and 14–6, tying Maryland for second place in the conference. The 14 conference wins by May were the most in program history for a first-year head coach, including the best win percentage in modern history, topping Steve Fisher's 12–6 conference record in his first official season as head coach with the 1989–90 Michigan team.

On March 14, No. 22 Michigan earned the three seed in the 2025 Big Ten tournament and defeated sixth-seeded No. 20 Purdue in the quarterfinal. With 23 wins on the season, May tied Steve Fisher for the second-most in program history by a first-year head coach. On March 15, Michigan defeated second-seeded No. 11 Maryland in the semifinal. On March 16, Michigan defeated fifth-seeded No. 18 Wisconsin in the Big Ten championship game, 59–53, winning the program's first Big Ten tournament since 2018. The Wolverines improved to 25–9, 17–6 against conference opponents and 7–5 against ranked opponents. With 25 wins on the season, May tied Brian Ellerbe for the most total wins in program history by a first-year head coach. He also became the first officially recognized conference coach to win the Big Ten tournament title in their first season, with the only other being Ellerbe in Michigan's first win in 1998, though that season was later vacated by the NCAA. Michigan finished as Big Ten champions one year after finishing in last place in the conference. The win earned Michigan the conference's automatic bid to the 2025 NCAA tournament as the No. 5 seed in the South Region. It was May's third consecutive season taking a team to the tournament.

On March 20, the Wolverines defeated No. 12 seed UC San Diego, 68–65, in the First Round in Denver, Colorado. With 26 wins, May became the winningest first-year head coach in program history. On March 22, Michigan defeated No. 4 seed Texas A&M in the Second Round 91–79, winning a fifth consecutive postseason game and improving to 27–9. It was May's second Sweet Sixteen appearance in three seasons. Under his leadership Michigan made history, as no team in the NCAA had ever lost as many games one season before advancing to the Sweet Sixteen of the tournament (since introduced in 1975). On March 28, Michigan lost to the No. 1 overall seed Auburn in the regional semifinal, 78–65. In May's first season, the Wolverines finished the year 27–10, an increase of 19 wins from the previous season.

==== 2025–26 ====
To start his second season with Michigan, May recruited one of the nation's best transfer portal classes (No. 2 by 247Sports and No. 3 by ESPN), highlighted by top overall player Yaxel Lendeborg, Aday Mara, Elliot Cadeau and Morez Johnson Jr. In late November, May led the Wolverines to a championship in the 2025 Players Era Festival. In the tournament, No. 7 Michigan defeated San Diego State by 40 points, No. 21 Auburn by 30 points and No. 12 Gonzaga by 40 points in the championship. The win against Gonzaga marked the highest margin of victory against an AP ranked opponent in program history, and was the first time in NCAA history that any team outscored AP ranked opponents by 30 or more points in consecutive games. It was also Mark Few's worst loss in 902 games as Gonzaga's head coach, and the Bulldogs' worst loss since 1990.

On December 8, Michigan was ranked No. 1 in the Coaches Poll for the first time since the Fab Five-led 1992–93 Wolverines, and No. 2 in the AP Poll after an 8–0 start to the season. Michigan won their first 14 games of the season and had a 20–1 record after the month of January, including beating No. 7 Michigan State on the road. It marked the Wolverines' first win at the Breslin Center since 2018. On February 11, May earned his 50th program win in 61 games at Michigan, becoming the second-fastest coach to reach the milestone in the Big Ten since 2002. On February 16, after improving the best start in school history with a 24–1 record, Michigan moved to No. 1 in the AP poll for the first time since the 2012–13 Michigan Wolverines. On February 24, Michigan clinched a share of the Big Ten regular season championship with a win against Minnesota. It was the Wolverines first Big Ten regular season title since 2021. On February 27, Michigan secured the outright Big Ten championship against No. 10 Illinois on the road, improving to 17–1 in the conference. The 17 conference wins surpassed a program record of 16 wins set by the 1976–77 and 1984–85 Wolverines.

On March 8, No. 3 Michigan defeated No. 8 Michigan State for a second time, finishing the regular season 29–2 and 19–1 in the conference. The 29 regular season wins are a program record and the 19 conference wins are a Big Ten record, surpassing the previous record set by the 1974–75 and 1975–76 Indiana Hoosiers (18–0). Michigan is the only Big Ten team to have ever won all ten conference road games, and the first to finish undefeated on the road since the 1975–76 Indiana Hoosiers. May was awarded the Big Ten Coach of the Year by members of the media. He was also selected as the national coach of the year, given the Henry Iba Award by the U.S. Basketball Writers Association.

In the 2026 Big Ten tournament, May led Michigan to a championship game appearance for a second straight season. In the quarterfinal against Ohio State, he became the first Michigan coach to defeat the rival Buckeyes three times in one season. In the semifinal against Wisconsin, May became to first Big Ten coach to defeat all 17 conference opponents in one season; after the Badgers handed Michigan their one conference loss during the season. In the Big Ten championship against Purdue, the Wolverines lost and snapped a 17-game win streak against Big Ten opponents.

In the 2026 NCAA tournament, Michigan received the 1-seed in the Midwest region. It was the fourth time in program history that Michigan earned a 1-seed and May's fourth consecutive year leading a team to the NCAA tournament. The Wolverines defeated 16-seed Howard in the first round, 101–80. In the second round, Michigan defeated 9-seed Saint Louis, 95–72, as May advanced to the Sweet Sixteen for a third time in four seasons. In the Sweet Sixteen, Michigan defeated 4-seed No. 18 Alabama, 90–77, winning a 34th game of the season and surpassing the program-record of 33 wins set by John Beilein and the 2017–18 Wolverines. In the Elite Eight, Michigan defeated 6-seed No. 23 Tennessee, 95–62, in the largest margin of victory by any team in a regional final since the Wolverines in 1989. It was his second appearance in the Final Four in four seasons. It was also the worst loss by Tennessee in an NCAA tournament game and tied for the worst loss of Rick Barnes' career. In the Final Four, Michigan defeated 1-seed No. 2 Arizona of the West Region, 91–73. Their 18-point win is tied for the largest margin of victory between 1-seeds in an NCAA tournament game since seeding began in 1979. Michigan became the first team in NCAA tournament history to score at least 90 points in five consecutive games in a single tournament. They won by double-digits and made at least ten threes in each game. On April 6, Michigan defeated 2-seed No. 7 UConn of the East region in the national championship game, 69–63. They held UConn and their previous three opponents to season-lows in field goal percentage. Michigan set a single-season point differential of +713, which is a Big Ten record. It was the program's first national title since 1989 and the first for the Big Ten Conference since 2000. Michigan finished with a program record, defeating a 13th AP-ranked opponent this season and officially set the program single-season record with an NCAA-leading 37th win, which tied the Big Ten record set by the 2004–05 Illinois Fighting Illini. May's 64 wins is tied for the most in NCAA Division I history in the first two seasons at a new school and the 29 win improvement over the 2023–24 Wolverines is the largest two-season differential since the NCAA tournament began. The improvement made Michigan the first program to go from 10 or fewer wins to a national championship in two seasons since the 1978–79 Michigan State Spartans.

=== U.S. national team ===
In May 2026, it was announced that May would serve as a court coach for the United States under-18 national team in training camp for the 2026 FIBA Under-18 AmeriCup.

=== Dallas Mavericks ===
On June 23, 2026, May was hired as the head coach for Dallas Mavericks of the National Basketball Association (NBA), replacing Jason Kidd. In doing so, May reunited with his Wolverines player Morez Johnson Jr., who was selected with the 9th pick in the 2026 NBA draft by Dallas later that day.

== Personal life ==
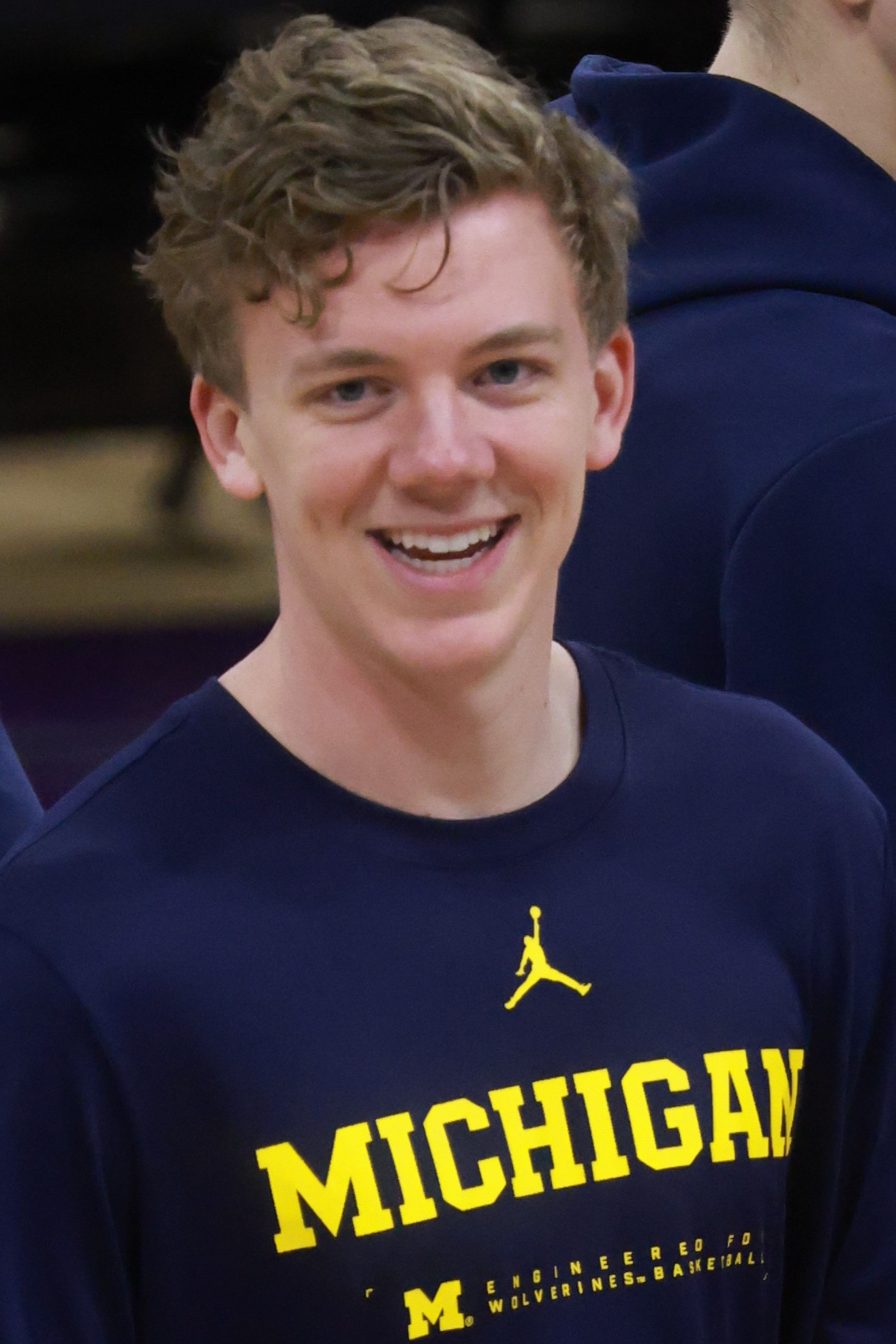
His son, Charlie May, in February 2026

May and his wife, Anna, have three sons. His eldest, Jack, played for the Florida Gators from 2020 to 2024, his middle son, Charlie, transferred from the UCF Knights to Michigan in 2024, and his youngest, Eli, was a team manager for his father's Wolverines squad.

== Head coaching record ==
Record table
Season	Team	Overall	Conference	Standing	Postseason
Florida Atlantic Owls (Conference USA) (2018–2023)
2018–19	Florida Atlantic	17–16	8–10	T–9th	CIT First Round
2019–20	Florida Atlantic	17–15	8–10	9th	
2020–21	Florida Atlantic	13–10	7–5	4th (East)	
2021–22	Florida Atlantic	19–15	11–7	T–2nd (East)	CBI First Round
2022–23	Florida Atlantic	35–4	18–2	1st	NCAA Division I Final Four
Florida Atlantic Owls (American Athletic Conference) (2023–2024)
2023–24	Florida Atlantic	25–9	14–4	2nd	NCAA Division I Round of 64
Florida Atlantic:		126–69 (.646)	66–38 (.635)		
Michigan Wolverines (Big Ten Conference) (2024–2026)
2024–25	Michigan	27–10	14–6	T–2nd	NCAA Division I Sweet 16
2025–26	Michigan	37–3	19–1	1st	NCAA Division I Champion
Michigan:		64–13 (.831)	33–7 (.825)		
Total:		190–82 (.699)			
National champion Postseason invitational champion Conference regular season champion Conference regular season and conference tournament champion Division regular season champion Division regular season and conference tournament champion Conference tournament champion
