= Morez Johnson Jr. =

American basketball player (born 2006)

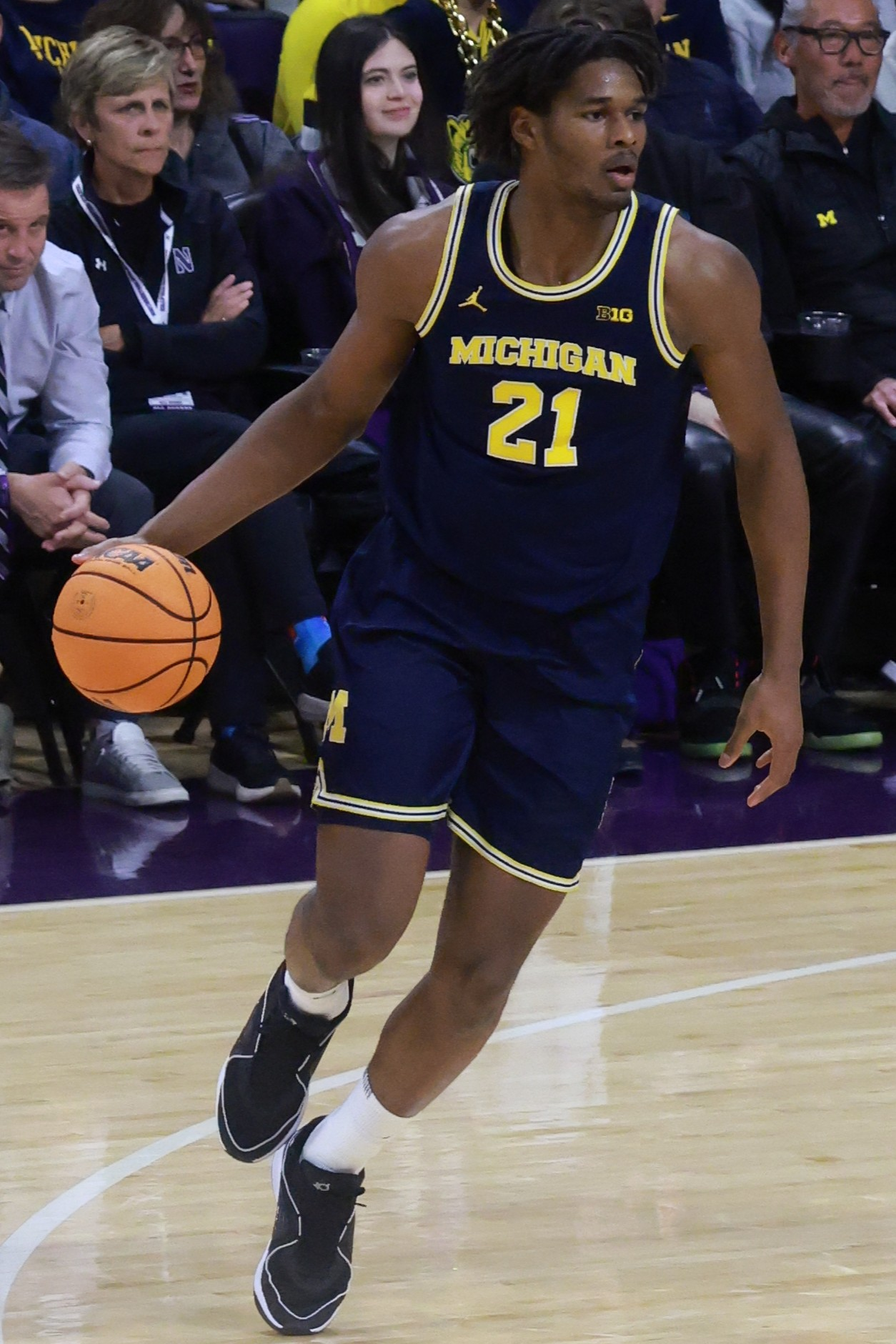
- Johnson for the 2025–26 Michigan Wolverines

No. 14 – Dallas Mavericks
- Position: Power forward
- League: NBA

Personal information
- Born: January 25, 2006 (age 20) Riverdale, Illinois, U.S.
- Listed height: 6 ft 10 in (2.08 m)
- Listed weight: 250 lb (113 kg)

Career information
- High school: Thornton Township (Harvey, Illinois); St. Rita of Cascia (Chicago, Illinois)
- College: Illinois (2024–2025); Michigan (2025–2026)
- NBA draft: 2026: 1st round, 9th overall pick
- Drafted by: Dallas Mavericks
- Playing career: 2026–present

Career history
- 2026–present: Dallas Mavericks

Career highlights
- NCAA champion (2026); Second-team All-Big Ten (2026); Big Ten All-Defensive Team (2026); Illinois Mr. Basketball (2024); Nike Hoop Summit (2024)
- Stats at NBA.com
- Stats at Basketball Reference
Medals
Men's basketball
Representing United States
FIBA Under-19 World Cup
Gold medal – first place	2025 Switzerland	Team
FIBA Under-18 AmeriCup
Gold medal – first place	2024 Argentina	Team

Morez Keith Johnson Jr. (born January 25, 2006) is an American basketball player for the Dallas Mavericks of the National Basketball Association. He played college basketball for the Illinois Fighting Illini and Michigan Wolverines. He was an NCAA national champion and earned All-Big Ten honors with the 2025–26 Michigan Wolverines. Johnson represented the United States national team at the 2024 FIBA Under-18 AmeriCup and the 2025 FIBA Under-19 World Cup, winning a gold medal in each tournament.

== Early life ==
Johnson was born in Riverdale, Illinois on January 25, 2006, the son of Natasha Jones and Morez Johnson Sr. He has a younger sister named Moriah. Johnson played his first three seasons at St. Rita of Cascia High School in Chicago, before transferring to Thornton Township High School in Harvey, Illinois for his final season. As a sophomore, he was a Associated Press Class 4A Second-team All-State selection in Illinois. As a junior, he was an AP Class 4A First-team All-State selection, along with Jeremy Fears Jr., Owen Freeman, Dai Dai Ames and Cam Christie. As a senior, he was named the Illinois Mr. Basketball in 2024.

=== Recruiting ===
In April 2021, Johnson received his first division 1 offer from Providence following his freshman season. After receiving an offer from Illinois in June 2021, he committed to play for his home-state school before the start of his sophomore season on November 5, 2021. At the time of his commitment he also held offers from Florida, Iowa, Nebraska, Ohio State, and Texas, amongst others. He was ranked as the No. 1 player in the state of Illinois and the No. 30 overall player in the country in 247Sports composite rankings in 2024.

College recruiting
Name	Hometown	School	Height	Weight	Commit date
Morez Johnson Jr. F/C	Riverdale, IL	Thornton Township	6 ft 9 in (2.06 m)	225 lb (102 kg)	Nov 5, 2021
Morez Johnson Jr. F/C	Recruit ratings: Rivals: 247Sports: ESPN: (89)				
Overall recruit ranking: Rivals: 27 247Sports: 31 ESPN: 29
Note: In many cases, Scout, Rivals, 247Sports, On3, and ESPN may conflict in their listings of height and weight.; In these cases, the average was taken. ESPN grades are on a 100-point scale.; Sources:

== College career ==
=== Illinois ===
Johnson enrolled at the University of Illinois in 2024, playing for head coach Brad Underwood and the Fighting Illini. On November 4, 2024, in his first collegiate game he had three points, eight rebounds and blocked a career-high six shots against Eastern Illinois. On November 26 against UMES, Johnson had 10 points and 13 rebounds in 14 minutes off the bench, his first career double-double. On January 8, 2025, he scored a career-high 20 points with 11 rebounds against Penn State, his second double-double. On February 2 against Ohio State, Johnson scored 14 points with a career-high 15 rebounds, his third double-double.

On February 15, Johnson broke his wrist against Michigan State. He missed the rest of the regular season and returned in the 2025 Big Ten tournament. Following the end of his freshman season, Johnson entered the NCAA transfer portal. He played in 30 games and started eight times for Illinois, averaging 7.0 points, 6.7 rebounds and 1.1 blocks per game.

=== Michigan ===
On April 1, 2025, Johnson transferred to the University of Michigan to play for head coach Dusty May. On November 3, in his debut for the 2025–26 Wolverines against Oakland, he led the team in scoring with a career-high 24 points. On December 29, he tied his career-high of 24 points and recorded 11 rebounds against McNeese State, helping Michigan establish a Big Ten Conference record of six victories with a margin of at least 40 points. On January 2, 2026, he set a new career-high with a 29 point, 6 rebound effort against No. 24 USC, as Michigan became the first team to beat three consecutive AP ranked opponents by at least 30 points. He was subsequently named the Co-Big Ten Player of the Week, averaging 26.5 points and 8.5 rebounds, while shooting 75% from the field. On January 14 against Washington, Johnson had 16 points and a career-high 16 rebounds. Following Michigan's regular season championship, he was an All-Big Ten Defensive team selection, an All-Big Ten second team selection by the media and third team selection by the coaches.

On March 19, in the first round of the 2026 NCAA tournament against No. 16 seed Howard, Johnson recorded 21 points and 10 rebounds, while shooting 8-of-8 from the field. He became only the fifth player in NCAA tournament history to shoot 100% and record at least 20 points and 10 rebounds. The team won the 2026 national championship and tied the Big Ten record for single-season wins, 37. Johnson was named to the All-Final Four tournament team, along with teammates Aday Mara and Elliot Cadeau. On April 24, he declared for the 2026 NBA draft after his sophomore season.

== Professional career ==
Following his sophomore season at Michigan, Johnson was selected with the ninth overall pick in the 2026 NBA draft by the Dallas Mavericks. Johnson also reunited with his college head coach, Dusty May, who was announced to be the Mavericks' head coach the day of the draft. He also became one of the three teammates from the Michigan Wolverines to be drafted in the lottery, joining Yaxel Lendeborg and Aday Mara. He signed with the Mavericks on June 25, 2026. On July 3, 2026, Johnson participated with the Mavericks in the 2026 NBA Summer League, where he only appeared in two games, averaging 18.5 points, 6.5 rebounds, and 1.5 assists.

Prior to the start of the season, head coach Dusty May emphasized on Johnson's future impact on the team, emphasizing on his tenacity and defense, calling it the pillars to Johnson's game. On October 21, 2026, Johnson made his NBA debut, where he recorded six points, three rebounds, and one assist against the Houston Rockets. Despite being available for the next upcoming games, Johnson was placed under time restriction. He set a career high of 13 points in 17 minutes on 5–5 shooting from the field on November 2 against the Sacramento Kings. On November 6 against the Utah Jazz, Johnson tied his career high with 13 points and set a new career high with 17 rebounds to record his first double-double.

== Team USA career ==
Johnson represented the United States national team at the 2024 FIBA Under-18 AmeriCup in Argentina. He played all six games and averaged 8.0 points, 9.0 rebounds and 1.2 blocks per game, leading the United States in rebounding as they won the gold medal. Michigan Wolverines teammate Trey McKenney was also on the national team.

The following year, Johnson was again selected for the United States national team at the 2025 FIBA Under-19 World Cup in Switzerland. He started six of the seven games, and again won a gold medal with the undefeated Team USA. In the championship game against Germany, Johnson scored 15 points and 10 rebounds. In total, he averaged 9.4 points, 6.4 rebounds and 1.7 blocks in 18.6 minutes per game.

== Career statistics ==
Legend
GP	Games played	GS	Games started	MPG	Minutes per game
FG%	Field goal percentage	3P%	3-point field goal percentage	FT%	Free throw percentage
RPG	Rebounds per game	APG	Assists per game	SPG	Steals per game
BPG	Blocks per game	PPG	Points per game	**Bold**	Career high

=== College ===
Year	Team	GP	GS	MPG	FG%	3P%	FT%	RPG	APG	SPG	BPG	PPG
2024–25	Illinois	30	8	17.6	.642	–	.618	6.7	0.3	0.4	1.1	7.0
2025–26	Michigan	40	40	25.1	.623	.343	.782	7.3	1.2	0.7	1.1	13.1
**Career**		**70**	**48**	**21.9**	**.628**	**.343**	**.722**	**7.0**	**0.8**	**0.6**	**1.1**	**10.5**
