= 2025–26 Michigan Wolverines men's basketball team =

American college basketball season

2025–26 Michigan Wolverines men's basketball

NCAA tournament National Champions Big Ten regular season champions Players Era Festival champions

National Championship Game, W 69–63 vs. UConn
- Conference: Big Ten Conference

Ranking
- Coaches: No. 1
- AP: No. 1
- Record: 37–3 (19–1 Big Ten)
- Head coach: Dusty May (2nd season)
- Assistant coaches: Mike Boynton (2nd season); Justin Joyner (2nd season); Akeem Miskdeen (2nd season); Kyle Church (2nd season); Drew Williamson (2nd season)
- Home arena: Crisler Center

2025–26 Big Ten Conference men's basketball standings
	Conf.				Overall
Team	W		L	PCT	W		L	PCT
No. 1 Michigan	19	–	1	.950	37	–	3	.925
No. 14 Nebraska	15	–	5	.750	28	–	7	.800
No. 5 Illinois	15	–	5	.750	28	–	9	.757
No. 11 Michigan State	15	–	5	.750	27	–	8	.771
No. 25 Wisconsin	14	–	6	.700	24	–	11	.686
No. 6 Purdue †	13	–	7	.650	30	–	9	.769
UCLA	13	–	7	.650	24	–	12	.667
Ohio State	12	–	8	.600	21	–	13	.618
No. 15 Iowa	10	–	10	.500	24	–	13	.649
Indiana	9	–	11	.450	18	–	14	.563
Minnesota	8	–	12	.400	15	–	18	.455
USC	7	–	13	.350	18	–	14	.563
Washington	7	–	13	.350	16	–	17	.485
Rutgers	6	–	14	.300	14	–	20	.412
Northwestern	5	–	15	.250	15	–	19	.441
Oregon	5	–	15	.250	12	–	20	.375
Maryland	4	–	16	.200	12	–	21	.364
Penn State	3	–	17	.150	12	–	20	.375
† 2026 Big Ten tournament winner Rankings from AP poll

The 2025–26 Michigan Wolverines men's basketball team represented the University of Michigan during the 2025–26 NCAA Division I men's basketball season. It was the program's 110th season and 109th consecutive year as a member of the Big Ten Conference. The Wolverines were led by second-year head coach Dusty May and played their home games at Crisler Center in Ann Arbor, Michigan.

On December 8, Michigan achieved the No. 1 ranking in the Coaches poll for the first time since the Fab Five-led 1992–93 Wolverines, and on February 16, Michigan earned the No. 1 ranking in the AP poll for the first time since the 2012–13 Wolverines. On February 24, Michigan clinched a share of the 2026 Big Ten regular season championship against Minnesota, and secured the outright Big Ten championship against Illinois on February 27. It was the Wolverines' first since the 2021 Big Ten regular season championship.

Michigan finished the regular season 29–2, and 19–1 in the conference. Their 29 regular-season wins are a program record, and their 19 conference wins are a Big Ten record. The conference wins surpassed the previous program record of 16 wins by the 1976–77 and 1984–85 Wolverines, and surpassed the previous Big Ten record set by the 1974–75 and 1975–76 Indiana Hoosiers (18–0). Michigan is the only Big Ten team to have ever won all ten conference road games, and the first to finish undefeated on the road since the 1975–76 Hoosiers. It was also the first Michigan team to defeat rival Ohio State three times in the same season.

In the 2026 NCAA tournament, Michigan made the Sweet Sixteen for an NCAA-leading ninth time in the last thirteen NCAA tournaments and set a program-record (and tied the 2004–05 Illinois Fighting Illini for the Big Ten record) for single-season wins, 37, as they won the national championship against UConn. Michigan surpassed the previous single-season wins record of 33 by John Beilein and the 2017–18 Wolverines. They became the first team to score at least 90 points in five games in a single NCAA tournament, and held their last four opponents to season-lows in field goal percentage.

It was the second national title in program history and the first since 1989. Michigan became the first Big Ten team to win the national title since their rival Michigan State in 2000. Michigan also joined the Florida Gators and Michigan State Spartans as the only programs to win multiple national championships in both basketball and football, and became the first program since Florida in 2008 to win a national title in each sport within three academic years.

== Previous season ==
The Wolverines finished the 2024–25 season with a 27–10 record, 14–6 in conference play to finish the regular season tied for second place. As the No. 3 seed in the Big Ten tournament, they defeated Purdue in the quarterfinal, Maryland in the semifinal, and Wisconsin in the final, winning their first Big Ten tournament championship since 2018. The Wolverines received the Big Ten's automatic bid to the NCAA tournament as the No. 5 seed in the South Region, where they defeated UC San Diego, and Texas A&M to advance to their sixth Sweet Sixteen in the last eight NCAA tournaments. In the regional semifinal, they lost to the No. 1 overall seed Auburn.

== Offseason ==
On March 24, 2025, guard Justin Pippen entered the NCAA transfer portal. He did not play or travel with the Wolverines in the postseason. Pippen transferred to the Cal Golden Bears. On March 31, forward Jace Howard entered the transfer portal after five seasons with Michigan and forward Sam Walters entered after one season with the program. Howard would transfer to the Fordham Rams and Walters to the SMU Mustangs. That same day, the Wolverines received their first transfer portal commitment from junior Elliot Cadeau, a point guard for the North Carolina Tar Heels. As a sophomore, Cadeau averaged 9.4 points per game and was second in the Atlantic Coast Conference (ACC) with 6.2 assists per game. He was a former five-star recruit in high school and started 68 games in his first two collegiate seasons. On April 1, point guard Tre Donaldson entered the transfer portal. He started all 37 games for the Wolverines in his lone season with the program. Donaldson would transfer to the Miami Hurricanes. That same day, Michigan received its second transfer portal commitment from sophomore forward Morez Johnson Jr. of the Illinois Fighting Illini. He started eight games as a freshman.

On April 5, the top-rated player in the transfer portal, forward Yaxel Lendeborg from the UAB Blazers, committed to the Wolverines as the third incoming transfer. He also entered the 2025 NBA draft process in addition to transferring. Last season Lendeborg became one of only two players in NCAA Division I history to record over 600 points, 400 rebounds and 150 assists in a single season, joining legend Larry Bird, and won the American Athletic Conference Defensive Player of the Year for a second consecutive season. He also led the NCAA with 26 double-doubles last season, averaging 17.7 points, 11.4 rebounds, 4.2 assists, 1.8 blocks and 1.7 steals per game. On April 9, guard Phat Phat Brooks entered the transfer portal, Michigan's fifth player to do so. Brooks transferred to the Central Michigan Chippewas. On April 11, the Wolverines secured their fourth incoming transfer commitment, junior Aday Mara, a 7'3" Spanish center from the UCLA Bruins.

On April 16, junior power forward Danny Wolf announced he would forgo his remaining eligibility and declared for the 2025 NBA draft. On April 21, shooting guard Nimari Burnett announced he would return for his final season after being granted a sixth year of eligibility. On May 27, Lendeborg withdrew from the NBA draft and chose to play his final season of college basketball in Ann Arbor. Lendeborg, Johnson and Mara had all played center the previous season.

=== Departures ===
Michigan departures
Name	Number	Pos.	Height	Weight	Year	Hometown	Reason for departure
Vladislav Goldin	50	C	7'1"	250	GS	Nalchik, Russia	Declared for NBA draft: undrafted, signed with Miami Heat
Rubin Jones	15	G	6'5"	190	GS	Houston, Texas	Graduated
Jace Howard	7	F	6'7"	215	GS	Miami, Florida	Transferred to Fordham
Ian Burns	14	G	6'6"	205	Sr	Winnetka, Illinois	Graduated
Danny Wolf	1	F / C	7'0"	250	Jr	Glencoe, Illinois	Declared for NBA draft: drafted by Brooklyn Nets
Tre Donaldson	3	G	6'3"	195	Jr	Tallahassee, Florida	Transferred to Miami
Sam Walters	24	F	6'10"	200	So	The Villages, Florida	Transferred to SMU
Justin Pippen	10	G	6'3"	180	Fr	Chatsworth, California	Transferred to California
Phat Phat Brooks	8	G	6'2"	190	Fr	Grand Rapids, Michigan	Transferred to Central Michigan

=== Incoming transfers ===
Michigan incoming transfers
Name	Number	Pos.	Height	Weight	Year	Hometown	Previous Team
Elliot Cadeau	3	G	6'1"	180	Jr	West Orange, New Jersey	North Carolina
Morez Johnson Jr.	21	F	6'9"	255	So	Riverdale, Illinois	Illinois
Yaxel Lendeborg	3	F	6'9"	240	GS	Pennsauken Township, New Jersey	UAB
Aday Mara	15	C	7'3"	240	Jr	Zaragoza, Spain	UCLA

=== Recruiting classes ===
==== 2025 recruiting class ====
On October 18, 2024, Michigan landed its first class of 2025 recruit, Winters Grady of Prolific Prep in Napa, California. At the time of his commitment, the four-star Tualatin, Oregon native was ranked No. 83 in the 2025 national class by 247Sports. On October 23, Michigan received their second commitment from New Zealand native Oscar Goodman, who was the 2023 FIBA Under-16 Asian Championship MVP and a 2024 FIBA Under-17 Basketball World Cup All-Tournament first team selection. He was rated as a top 100, four-star player by On3, but unrated by 247Sports at the time of his commitment. On November 9, the Wolverines earned their third commitment from Flint, Michigan native and five-star guard from St. Mary's Preparatory, Trey McKenney. McKenney won a gold medal and started every game for the United States national team in the 2024 FIBA Under-18 AmeriCup in Argentina. At the time of his commitment, he was ranked as the No. 16 overall player in the country by ESPN and No. 19 in 247Sports' composite rankings. All three players officially signed their national letter of intent during the early signing period in November 2024.

On January 7, 2025, Goodman enrolled early, joining the 2024–25 Michigan basketball team midseason. As a result of him graduating in November 2024, based on the New Zealand academic calendar, he would remain a member of Michigan's 2025 recruiting class. He used the season to redshirt and was limited to practice only. On January 27, McKenney was named a 2025 McDonald's All-American. He was the first Michigan signee to be selected since Moussa Diabaté, Caleb Houstan and Kobe Bufkin in 2021. On May 16, Michigan received their fourth commitment in the 2025 class from forward Ricky Liburd, whom flipped from his commitment to play for Coastal Carolina. He attended Sagemont School near his hometown of Hollywood, Florida, and was ranked as a three-star recruit by 247Sports. On June 13, the Wolverines received their fifth commitment from 7'1" center Malick Kordel from Oberhausen, Germany. He played for the Frankfurt Skyliners junior team before moving to the United States for college basketball at age 21.

College recruiting
Name	Hometown	School	Height	Weight	Commit date
Trey McKenney; G/F	Flint, Michigan	St. Mary's Preparatory	6 ft 4 in (1.93 m)	225 lb (102 kg)	Nov 9, 2024
Trey McKenney; G/F	Recruit ratings: Rivals: 247Sports: On3: ESPN: (89)				
Winters Grady; SF	Tualatin, Oregon	Prolific Prep	6 ft 6 in (1.98 m)	200 lb (91 kg)	Oct 18, 2024
Winters Grady; SF	Recruit ratings: Rivals: 247Sports: On3: ESPN: (82)				
Oscar Goodman; F	Ōpunake, New Zealand	New Plymouth	6 ft 7 in (2.01 m)	225 lb (102 kg)	Oct 23, 2024
Oscar Goodman; F	Recruit ratings: Rivals: 247Sports: ESPN: (80)				
Ricky Liburd; SF	Hollywood, Florida	Sagemont School	6 ft 4 in (1.93 m)	180 lb (82 kg)	May 16, 2025
Ricky Liburd; SF	Recruit ratings: 247Sports: On3:				
Malick Kordel; C	Oberhausen, Germany	Bertha-von-Suttner Gymnasium	7 ft 1 in (2.16 m)	253 lb (115 kg)	Jun 13, 2025
Malick Kordel; C	Recruit ratings: No ratings found				
Overall recruit ranking: 247Sports: 29 On3: 35
Note: In many cases, Scout, Rivals, 247Sports, On3, and ESPN may conflict in their listings of height and weight.; In these cases, the average was taken. ESPN grades are on a 100-point scale.; Sources: "2025 Michigan Wolverines Recruiting Class". ESPN.; "2025 Team Ranking". Rivals.; "2025 Michigan Wolverines". 247Sports.; "2025 Michigan Wolverines". On3.

==== 2026 recruiting class ====
College recruiting (2026)
Name	Hometown	School	Height	Weight	Commit date
Brandon McCoy Jr. PG/SG	Bellflower, California	Sierra Canyon	6 ft 5 in (1.96 m)	190 lb (86 kg)	Apr 4, 2026
Brandon McCoy Jr. PG/SG	Recruit ratings: Rivals: 247Sports: ESPN: (90)				
Quinn Costello; PF/C	Boston, Massachusetts	The Newman School	6 ft 10 in (2.08 m)	195 lb (88 kg)	Sep 16, 2025
Quinn Costello; PF/C	Recruit ratings: Rivals: 247Sports: ESPN: (89)				
Lincoln Cosby; SF/PF	Liberty Township, Ohio	Montverde Academy	6 ft 9 in (2.06 m)	205 lb (93 kg)	Feb 10, 2026
Lincoln Cosby; SF/PF	Recruit ratings: Rivals: 247Sports: ESPN: (88)				
Joseph Hartman; SG	Gainesville, Florida	The Rock School	6 ft 6 in (1.98 m)	193 lb (88 kg)	Oct 1, 2025
Joseph Hartman; SG	Recruit ratings: Rivals: 247Sports: ESPN: (82)				
Malachi Brown; SG/SF	Knoxville, Tennessee	Knoxville Catholic	6 ft 5 in (1.96 m)	185 lb (84 kg)	Sep 24, 2025
Malachi Brown; SG/SF	Recruit ratings: Rivals: 247Sports: ESPN: (79)				
Marcus Moller; C	Denmark	Unicaja-Andalucía Málaga	7 ft 3 in (2.21 m)	230 lb (100 kg)	Jul 8, 2025
Marcus Moller; C	Recruit ratings: No ratings found				
Overall recruit ranking: 247Sports: 2 On3: 5
Note: In many cases, Scout, Rivals, 247Sports, On3, and ESPN may conflict in their listings of height and weight.; In these cases, the average was taken. ESPN grades are on a 100-point scale.; Sources: "2026 Michigan Wolverines Recruiting Class". ESPN.; "2026 Team Ranking". Rivals.; "2026 Michigan Wolverines". 247Sports.; "2026 Michigan Wolverines". On3.

== Roster ==
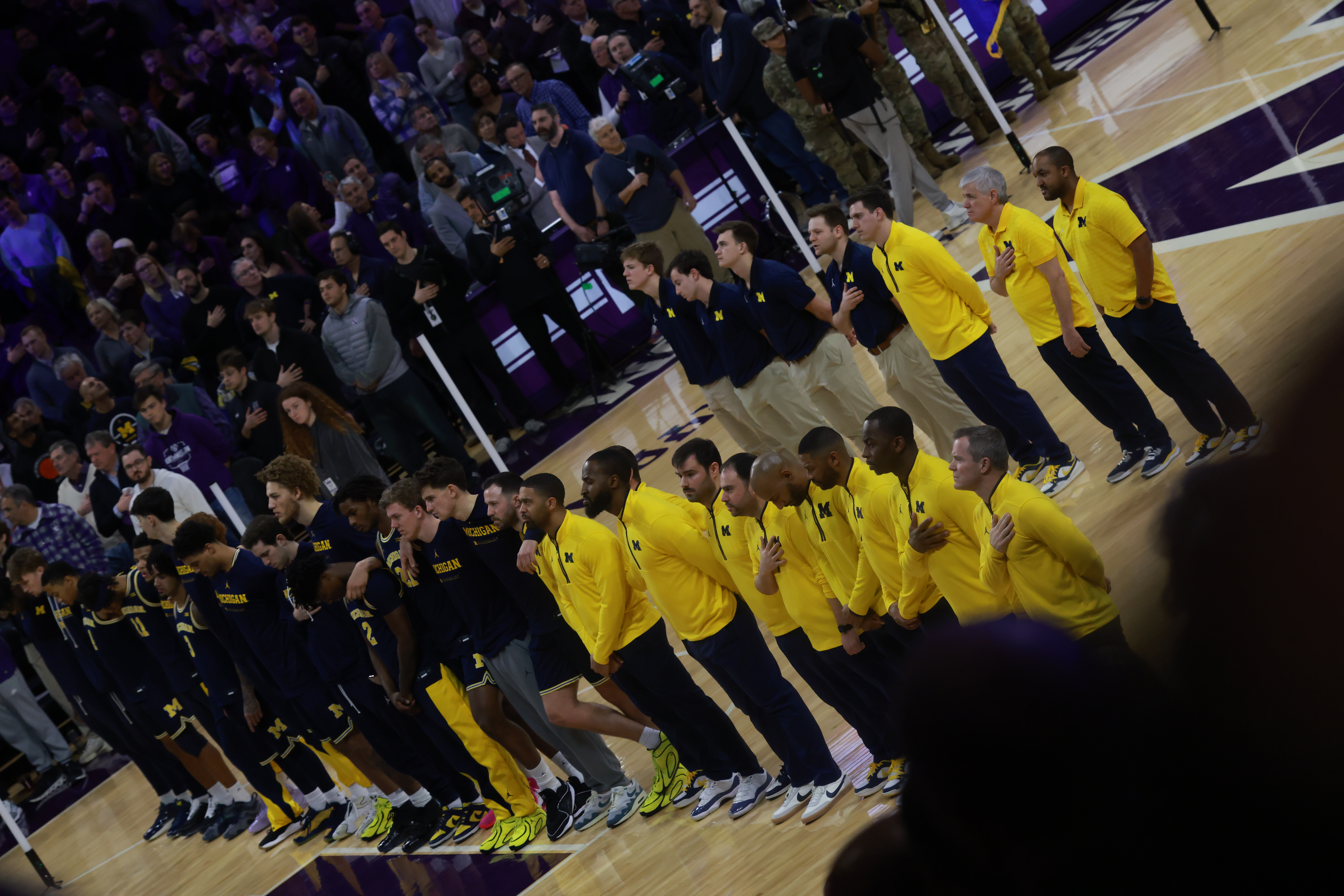

2025–26 Michigan Wolverines men's basketball team
Players
Coaches

Pos.	#	Name	Height	Weight	Year	Previous school	Hometown
G/F	0	Ricky Liburd (redshirt)	6 ft 4 in (1.93 m)	190 lb (86 kg)	Fr	Sagemont School	Hollywood, FL
G	1	Trey McKenney	6 ft 4 in (1.93 m)	225 lb (102 kg)	Fr	St. Mary's Preparatory	Flint, MI
G	2	L.J. Cason (injured)	6 ft 2 in (1.88 m)	195 lb (88 kg)	So	Victory Christian Academy	Lakeland, FL
G	3	Elliot Cadeau	6 ft 1 in (1.85 m)	180 lb (82 kg)	Jr	North Carolina	West Orange, NJ
G	4	Nimari Burnett	6 ft 5 in (1.96 m)	195 lb (88 kg)	GS	Alabama	Chicago, IL
F	5	Oscar Goodman	6 ft 7 in (2.01 m)	235 lb (107 kg)	RS Fr	New Plymouth HS	Ōpunake, New Zealand
G	7	Howard Eisley Jr. (W)	6 ft 0 in (1.83 m)	200 lb (91 kg)	So	Archbishop Stepinac HS	New York, NY
G/F	10	Winters Grady (injured)	6 ft 6 in (1.98 m)	210 lb (95 kg)	Fr	Prolific Prep	Tualatin, OR
G	11	Roddy Gayle Jr.	6 ft 5 in (1.96 m)	210 lb (95 kg)	Sr	Ohio State	Niagara Falls, NY
G	12	Charlie May (W)	6 ft 5 in (1.96 m)	190 lb (86 kg)	RS Jr	Central Florida	Boca Raton, FL
F	13	Harrison Hochberg (W) (redshirt)	6 ft 7 in (2.01 m)	220 lb (100 kg)	Jr	Cushing Academy	New York, NY
C	15	Aday Mara	7 ft 3 in (2.21 m)	255 lb (116 kg)	Jr	UCLA	Zaragoza, Spain
F	21	Morez Johnson Jr.	6 ft 9 in (2.06 m)	250 lb (113 kg)	So	Illinois	Riverdale, IL
F	23	Yaxel Lendeborg	6 ft 9 in (2.06 m)	240 lb (109 kg)	GS	UAB	Pennsauken, NJ
C	32	Malick Kordel	7 ft 2 in (2.18 m)	275 lb (125 kg)	Fr	Bertha-von-Suttner Gym	Oberhausen, Germany
F	42	Will Tschetter	6 ft 8 in (2.03 m)	230 lb (104 kg)	GS	Stewartville HS	Stewartville, MN

Head coach

- Dusty May – (alum: Indiana)

Assistant coach(es)

- Mike Boynton – assistant coach / defensive coordinator (South Carolina)
- Justin Joyner – assistant coach (UC Santa Barbara)
- Akeem Miskdeen – assistant coach (Queens (NC))
- Kyle Church – assistant coach / general manager (Charlotte)
- Drew Williamson – assistant coach / director of player development (Old Dominion)
- Brandon Gilbert – special assistant (Florida)
- Matt Aldred – strength and conditioning coach (Loughborough)
- KT Harrell – director of basketball operations (Auburn)

Legend

- (C) Team captain
- (S) Suspended
- (I) Ineligible
- (W) Walk-on
- Injured
- Current redshirt

Roster

== Regular season ==
=== November ===
==== Oakland ====
On November 3, Michigan began the season with a 121–78 victory over Oakland, winning a 23rd consecutive season-opening game. For the first time in program history, seven Wolverines scored in double figures. Michigan was led by Morez Johnson Jr. with a career-high 24 points, while Aday Mara had 12 points, 12 rebounds and five blocks; his first double-double of the season. Five others scored in double figures, including freshman Trey McKenney scoring 21 points in his collegiate debut on 6-of-8 three-point shooting, Will Tschetter with 16 points, Nimari Burnett with 14 points, Yaxel Lendeborg added 12 points, and Roddy Gayle Jr. had 11 points. Elliot Cadeau added a career-high 14 assists in his debut. Michigan scored a program-record 69 points in the first half, shooting 71% from the field and surpassing the previous record of 66 points set by the 1987–88 Wolverines against Eastern Michigan. The 121 points were the most scored since the 1989–90 Wolverines scored 127 against Iowa, and marked the sixth time in program history eclipsing 120 points in a game. The Wolverines finished shooting 64% from the field, tied a program-record with 19 made three-point shots (on 35 attempts: 54%), committed only eight turnovers, and had 55 bench points.

==== Wake Forest ====
On November 11, Michigan defeated Wake Forest, 85–84 in overtime, during the Deacon-Wolverine Challenge at Little Caesars Arena. Michigan was led by Mara with 18 points, and career-highs 13 rebounds, six assists, and five blocks; his second double-double of the season. Cadeau had 17 points, a career-high eight rebounds, and seven assists, surpassing 200 career rebounds and 400 career assists. Gayle Jr. had 13 points, and Johnson Jr. added ten points and eight rebounds. With 13 rebounds, Mara surpassed 200 for his career. Michigan led by 13 at halftime, but started 0-for-12 on three-point attempts in the second half, allowing Wake Forest to tie the game and force overtime. Cadeau scored or assisted on all five of Michigan's overtime points.

==== TCU ====
On November 14, Michigan defeated TCU, 67–63. Michigan was led by double-double performances from Lendeborg with 14 points and ten rebounds, and Johnson Jr. with ten points and 12 rebounds. McKenney scored 11 points and Gayle Jr. added ten points and six assists. With his ten rebounds, Lendeborg surpassed 800 in his NCAA Division I career.

==== Middle Tennessee ====
On November 19, Michigan defeated Middle Tennessee, 86–61. Michigan was led by Lendeborg with a game-high 25 points, and 12 rebounds, his second double-double of the season. Mara added ten points and ten rebounds off the bench, for his third double-double of the season, while Cadeau scored ten points. Tschetter added five points in his first start since March 13, 2024. Ten Wolverines scored during the game, with a season-high 13 players earning minutes. Michigan's defense forced 15 turnovers, the most by a Wolverines opponent in a game this season.

==== San Diego State ====
On November 24, Michigan defeated San Diego State, 94–54, in the first game of the 2025 Players Era Festival. Michigan was led by Lendeborg with a game-high 15 points, six rebounds and four assists. Five others scored in double figures, Johnson Jr. and Cadeau with 13 points each, Burnett and Gayle Jr. scored 11 points each, and Tschetter added ten points. Tschetter became the 76th Wolverine in program history to appear in 100 career games.

==== Auburn ====
On November 25, Michigan defeated No. 21 Auburn, 102–72, to advance to the Players Era Festival championship game. Michigan was led by Lendeborg with 17 points, five rebounds and four assists, while Gayle Jr. added a season-high 17 points and six rebounds. Four others scored in double figures, Burnett and Johnson Jr. with 15 points each, McKenney scored 11 points and Cason added ten points. Michigan used a 21–4 run late in the first half to extend their lead to 29 points. Michigan shot 51.5% from the field, including 14 of 35 (40%) from three-point range. A season-high 11 players reached the scoresheet, including freshman Winters Grady scoring his first career points. The win marked Michigan's first NCAA-recognized 30-plus-point win over a power-four opponent since a 104–68 win against No. 3 Purdue on March 3, 1987. The Wolverines scored 100-plus points against a ranked opponent for the first time since defeating No. 6 Duke 113–108 on December 9, 1989.

==== Gonzaga ====
On November 26, Michigan defeated No. 12 Gonzaga, 101–61, to win the Players Era Festival championship. Michigan was led by Lendeborg with a game-high 20 points and 11 rebounds, his third double-double of the season, and was named tournament MVP. Four others scored in double figures, McKenney with 17 points, Burnett scored 14 points, Mara had 13 points, and Johnson Jr. added 11 points. Cadeau recorded 13 assists, tied for the seventh most in a single game in program history. The Wolverines won their three games by an average of 36.7 points. Michigan's 40 point win was Mark Few's worst loss in 902 games as Gonzaga's head coach, and the Bulldogs worst loss since losing 144–100 to Loyola Marymount in 1990. Gonzaga was held to 33.8% shooting from the floor, including 3-of-22 (13.6%) from three-point range. The win marked the highest margin of victory against an AP ranked opponent in program history, and was the first time in NCAA history that any team outscored AP ranked opponents by 30 or more points in consecutive games.

=== December ===
==== Rutgers ====
On December 6, Michigan opened the Big Ten Conference season against Rutgers, defeating the Scarlet Knights, 101–60. Michigan was led by Johnson Jr. with a game-high 22 points. Five others scored in double figures, Lendeborg with 14 points, McKenney added 13 points, and Cadeau, Cason and Gayle Jr. scored 11 points each. Michigan shot 60% from the field and scored 22 of their first 24 points in the paint, and finished the game with a season-high 52 points in the paint. The Wolverines scored more than 100 points for the third consecutive game, marking the first time this has occurred since the season they won the national championship in 1989. Michigan's 41-point win was the fourth-largest margin of victory against a Big Ten team in program history. On December 8, Michigan achieved the No. 1 ranking in the Coaches poll for the first time since the Fab Five-led 1992–93 Wolverines, and No. 2 in the AP poll after an 8–0 start to the season.

==== Villanova ====
On December 9, Michigan defeated Villanova, 89–61. Michigan was led by Cadeau with 18 points, four assists and three rebounds. Mara added 11 points eight rebounds and two blocks, and McKenney scored ten points. The Wolverines went on an early 18–3 run, including scoring 15 straight points, in the first half and finished the half on a 12–0 run, to take a 30-point lead at halftime. Michigan's defense held Villanova to season lows in points (61), field-goal percentage (34 percent), and assists (six), while forcing a season-high 15 turnovers. Michigan became the only team since at least the 1995–96 season to win six straight games by at least 25 points with at least two of those victories against ranked opponents.

==== Maryland ====
On December 13, Michigan defeated Maryland, 101–83. Michigan was led by Lendeborg with 29 points, a career-high nine assists, eight rebounds, three blocks and two steals, nearly posting a triple-double. Mara scored 18 points, Cason had a season-high 12 points, and Cadeau added 12 points and ten assists for a double-double. Maryland lost their leading scorer, Pharrel Payne, with 4:36 remaining in the first half. Michigan trailed 45–50 at halftime, and overcame a halftime deficit for the second time this season and the first since they beat TCU on November 14. An early second-half nine-point deficit was the largest of the season to date. Michigan committed a season-low nine turnovers. With the win, Michigan improved to 10–0 to start the season for the sixth time in program history.

==== La Salle ====
On December 21, Michigan defeated La Salle, 102–50. Michigan was led by McKenney with 17 points, while Mara recorded 14 points and ten rebounds for his fourth double-double of the season. Three others scored in double figures, Cadeau added 14 points, Cason posted a season-high 13 points, and Johnson Jr. scored ten points. Michigan's defense allowed just four points in the paint and held La Salle to 20.8 percent shooting on two-point attempts. La Salle's 50 points were the fewest allowed by Michigan this season.

==== McNeese ====
On December 29, Michigan defeated McNeese, 112–71. Michigan was led by Johnson Jr. with a career-high tying 24 points and 11 rebounds, for his second double-double of the season. Five others scored in double figures, Lendeborg added 16 points and eight rebounds, Mara and McKenney had 13 points each, Burnett had 12 points, and Gayle Jr. added ten points. Michigan made more free throws (31) than McNeese made field goals (23). The game marked Michigan's third consecutive 100-point game, tying the program record for consecutive 100-point games for the second time this season. The win also marked the sixth victory of 40 points or more this season, the most in Big Ten history. They joined the 1989–90 and 1965–66 Wolverines with seven 100-point games, tied for fourth most in program history. Michigan improved to 12–0 to start the season for the fourth time in program history, and had their best start since the 2018–19 Wolverines with a program record 17–0.

=== January ===
==== USC ====
On January 2, Michigan defeated No. 24 USC, 96–66. Michigan was led by Johnson Jr. with a new career-high 29-points, and six rebounds. Four others scored in double figures, Gayle Jr. had 12 points, and Cason, McKenney and Tschetter added ten points each off the bench. Michigan's starting guard Burnett was helped from the court with 16:25 left after falling during a battle under the basket, and didn't return. Michigan became the first team in the AP Poll era to defeat three consecutive ranked opponents by at least 30 points. Michigan was in the bonus before USC scored. Michigan's defense held USC to four assists during the game, the eighth time they held their opponent to single-digit assists this season.

==== Penn State ====
On January 6, Michigan defeated Penn State, 74–72. Michigan was led by Cason with a career-high 14 points. Three others scored in double figures, Burnett and McKenney scored 12 points each, and Lendeborg added ten points, seven rebounds, and four assists. Michigan led by as many as 13 points heading into the under-16 minute timeout. Penn State used a 12–0 run to reduce Michigan's lead to three points, as Michigan had a nearly four minute scoring drought. Mara made a free throw with 15 seconds to go, the first Michigan points since the 3:09 mark, and the defense forced a contested desperation Penn State three-point shot that bounced off the rim to secure the victory.

==== Wisconsin ====
On January 10, Michigan lost their first game of the season to Wisconsin, 91–88. Michigan was led by Cadeau with 19 points, Johnson Jr. scored 18 points, Lendeborg added 14 points and six rebounds, and Burnett had ten points. Scoring nine points, Gayle Jr. surpassed 500 career points as a Wolverine. With Michigan down two points in the final minute of the game, a potential game-tying put-back by Mara was waved off for goaltending. Wisconsin went on to convert one-of-two free throws on their final possession to extend their lead to three points before Michigan missed a game-tying three-point attempt as time expired. Michigan finished the game going 1-for-10 from the field in the final four minutes. This marked the fourth time in program history the Wolverines had won at least 14 straight games before their first loss.

==== Washington ====
On January 14, Michigan defeated Washington, 82–72. Michigan was led by Mara with 20 points on 10-of-11 shooting with three blocks. Johnson Jr. had 16 points and a career-high 16 rebounds for his third double-double of the season. Lendeborg added 14 points and seven rebounds. The trio combined for 50 of the team's 82 points and 40 of the team's 50 points in the paint. Michigan entered the game averaging 43.1 paint points per game, which led the Big Ten. With seven points in the game, Burnett surpassed 1,000-career points.

==== Oregon ====
On January 17, Michigan defeated Oregon, 81–71. Michigan was led by Cadeau with 17 points and five assists. Two others scored in double figures, Burnett added 15 points, three rebounds, three assists, two steals, and a block, and Mara had 12 points, three assists and three blocks. Michigan trailed 41–40 at halftime, its third halftime deficit of the season. Michigan shot 60 percent from the field in the second half to secure victory. With the win, Michigan became one of two Big Ten teams undefeated against West Coast opponents since conference expansion, improving to 6–0 with four road wins.

==== Indiana ====
On January 20, Michigan defeated Indiana, 86–72. Michigan was led by Cadeau with a season-high tying 19 points. Three others scored in double figures, Lendeborg with 15 points and seven rebounds, Mara had 13 points and McKenney added ten points. With seven points in the game, Tschetter surpassed 600 career points. Michigan led by as many as 23 points in the second half, before enduring a field-goal drought lasting more than seven minutes, which ended with a Lendeborg alley-oop following an Indiana turnover with 3:55 remaining. Michigan scored 12 points at the free-throw line during their field-goal drought to remain in the lead. The Wolverines finished the half with 21 of their final 36 points coming from the free-throw line.

==== Ohio State ====
On January 23, Michigan defeated Ohio State in their rivalry game, 74–62. Michigan was led by Lendeborg with 18 points, nine rebounds and four assists. Three others scored in double figures, Johnson Jr. and McKenney scored 12 points each, and Mara added 11 points and six rebounds. The game featured 12 lead changes, and remained within two possessions until the 6:30 mark of the second half, when the Wolverines pulled ahead by double digits. During a halftime ceremony, Michigan honored Trey Burke, raising his No. 3 jersey to the rafters. He became the sixth honored jersey in program history.

==== Nebraska ====
On January 27, Michigan defeated No. 5 Nebraska, 75–72. Michigan was led by Johnson Jr. with 17 points and 12 rebounds for his fourth double-double of the season. Three others scored in double figures, McKenney with 11 points and Lendeborg and Mara added ten points each. Michigan trailed for more than 36 minutes but closed the game on a late 6–0 run to secure the comeback win. Michigan held Nebraska to 22 second-half points, the third-lowest total allowed by Michigan in a half this season. The victory marked Michigan's first AP Top 5 Big Ten win since February 10, 2022, when the Wolverines upset No. 3 Purdue. The Wolverines handed the Cornhuskers their first loss of the season, and ended their 24-game winning streak dating back to the previous season. Nebraska was without Rienk Mast and Braden Frager, two of their top three scorers due to injury. This was the longest winning streak in NCAA Division I since the 2014–15 Kentucky Wildcats went 38–0 before losing to Wisconsin in the Final Four.

==== Michigan State ====
On January 30, Michigan defeated No. 7 Michigan State in their in-state rivalry game, 83–71. Michigan was led by Lendeborg with 26 points and 12 rebounds for his fourth double-double of the season. Three others scored in double figures, Cadeau with 17 points, Johnson Jr. had 12 points, and McKenney added ten points. Michigan State missed 14 of their first 18 shots, and finished the first half with more turnovers (11) than field goals (7). After leading by as many as 18 points late in the first half, Michigan State went on a 13–2 run, cutting Michigan's lead to three points early in the second half. The Spartans took their first lead of the game with 7:27 left in the game. The Wolverines finished the game on a 26–12 run over the final seven minutes to secure the victory. Michigan's defense held Michigan State to 26 points in the first half, its lowest total in an opening half this season. The win marked Michigan's first victory at the Breslin Center since January 13, 2018. The win also marked the first time Michigan has defeated consecutive opponents ranked in the Associated Press top-ten since defeating No. 6 North Carolina and No. 8 Gonzaga at the Battle 4 Atlantis in November 2019. With the win, Michigan improved to 20–1 to start the season, tying the 2012–13 and 2018–19 Wolverines for the best starts in program history.

=== February ===
==== Penn State ====
On February 5, Michigan defeated Penn State in their second meeting, 110–69. Michigan was led by Burnett with a career-high 31 points, including seven three-pointers. Four others scored in doubles figures, Cason, McKenney and Johnson Jr. had 12 points each, and Mara added 11 points and a career-high six blocks. Burnett became the first Wolverine to make seven or more three-pointers at Crisler Center since Aubrey Dawkins on March 7, 2015. The Wolverines held a 56–24 lead at halftime, after shooting 66% from the field. This marked their highest-scoring first half of the season. Michigan's 41-point margin of victory was tied for the sixth-largest against a Big Ten opponent in program history. Michigan became the first team since the 1987–88 Wolverines to score 100 or more points against multiple conference opponents in the same season. Michigan finished with 100-plus points for the eighth time and won by 40-plus points for the eighth time this season. With the win, Michigan improved to 21–1 to start the season, setting a record for the best start in program history.

==== Ohio State ====
On February 8, Michigan defeated Ohio State, 82–61, in the rivalry rematch. Michigan was led by Mara with a then career-high 24 points, a career-best 11 made field goals and the first two made three-pointers of his collegiate career. Mara became the third NCAA Division I 7-foot-3-inch (2.2 m) player to record a three-point shot this season and the fourth to make multiple threes in a game since the 2002–03 season. Lendeborg had 14 point and a season-high 14 rebounds, while Johnson added 11 points and 12 rebounds. The last time Michigan had two players achieve double-doubles in the same game was Mara and Lendeborg on November 19, 2025, against Middle Tennessee. McKenney added 12 points off the bench. It was the widest margin of victory for Michigan in Columbus since a 90–66 February 9, 1976 win by the 1975–76 Wolverines. It marks the first sweep by two double digit margins for either team since 2003 and the highest combined margin of victory (+33) in a sweep by Michigan since the 1988–89 Wolverines won the national championship.

==== Northwestern ====
On February 11, Michigan defeated Northwestern, 87–75. Michigan was led by Cason with career-highs of 18 points and four steals, while Lendeborg added 15 points and 12 rebounds for a double-double. Three others scored in double figures, Mara, McKenney and Johnson Jr. scored 12 points each. Michigan trailed by nine points at halftime and as many as 16 points early in the second half. From the 14:00 mark on, Northwestern shot 3-for-14, while Michigan went 11-for-12, completing a 23–4 run for the come-from-behind victory. Michigan scored on 21 straight possessions during the comeback. Lendeborg became the first Wolverine to have double-doubles in consecutive regular-season games since Hunter Dickinson in 2023. The victory was the 50th for head coach Dusty May in 61 games, becoming the second-fastest to reach the milestone in the Big Ten since 2002.

==== UCLA ====
On February 14, Michigan defeated UCLA, 86–56. Michigan was led by Lendeborg with 17 points, eight rebounds, and two blocks. Three others scored in double figures, Johnson Jr. scored 15 points, Cason added 13 points off the bench, and Burnett had 12 points. Michigan held a two-point lead at halftime, and scored on nine straight shots to open the second half on a 19–7 scoring run to secure the victory. The 30-point win against UCLA marks the largest margin of victory against the Bruins in program history. UCLA was held to 18 points in the second half, the lowest-point total scored in a half by any conference opponent this season. On February 16, Michigan moved up to the No. 1 ranking in the AP poll for the first time since the 2012–13 Wolverines that were the runner-up in the national championship.

==== Purdue ====
On February 17, Michigan defeated No. 7. Purdue, 91–80, for their 11th consecutive win. Michigan was led by Cadeau with 17 points, and double-double performances from Mara with 10 points and 11 rebounds, and Johnson Jr. with 12 points and 11 rebounds. Three others scored in double figures, McKenney, Lendeborg and Cason added 13 points each. This marked the first time Michigan had six players reach double-figures since December 29, 2025 against McNeese. After five lead changes in the first six minutes, Michigan used a 16–0 run to take a 26–11 lead. Each of Michigan's first 14 baskets were assisted. With his 13 points, Lendeborg surpassed 1,500 points in his NCAA Division I career. Prior to the game, a video of Lendeborg making derogatory remarks about Purdue went viral. However, the video was actually a recording of Lendeborg's perspective of Purdue's status when they were the number one team in the country the prior fall according to coach May. Michigan had lost 15 of the last 22 meetings at Mackey Arena (since 1999), including the prior three. Hosting its first number-one ranked opponent since 2005, Purdue pulled out all stops to energize the crowd, including cameos from former stars Robbie Hummel and Zach Edey, as well as former coach Gene Keady. With the win Michigan took an 11–10 lead in head-to-head games when both teams are ranked (which had not happened at Mackey since 1994) and scored the most points by an opponent at Mackey since 1989. It was Michigan's first win as a number-one ranked team against an AP top-10 team since March 6, 1965 against Vanderbilt.

==== Duke ====
On February 21, Michigan lost their second game of the season to No. 3 Duke, 68–63, in the Capital Showcase at Capital One Arena. Michigan was led by Lendeborg with 21 points and seven rebounds. Two others scored in doubles figures, Johnson Jr. with 13 points and six rebounds and three blocks, while Mara added 10 points and two blocks. Lendeborg scored 10 consecutive points in two minutes in the first half, and finished with 16 points in the half. The first half featured 13 lead changes, and neither team led by more than five points. Patrick Ngongba II was fouled with 0.8 seconds left and made both free throws to give Duke a 35–33 lead at halftime. Down three points late in the game, Michigan failed to secure a defensive rebound, which led to two Duke free throws to secure the victory. This marked the first meeting between the two teams since December 3, 2013, in the ACC–Big Ten Challenge. Michigan shot 40 percent from the field, and finished with a season-low 22 field goals.

==== Minnesota ====
On February 25, Michigan defeated Minnesota, 77–67, to clinch a share of the 2026 Big Ten regular season title for the first time since the 2020–21 Wolverines. Michigan was led by Cadeau with 15 points, four rebounds and five assists. Three others scored in double figures, Cason with 14 points, McKenney had 12 points on four three-pointers, and Mara added 10 points. During the first-half Michigan used an 11–0 run that spanned nearly five minutes to take a 28–20 lead, as Minnesota went 0-for-8 from the field. Minnesota repsonded with six points, and Michigan led 32–28 at halftime. Midway through the second-half Michigan used a 12–2 run to take a 63–49 lead. Minnesota never trimmed the deficit below double digits over the final eight minutes of the game. Michigan made 9 of 18 shots from three-point range in the second half. Burnett recorded his 400th career rebound and surpassed 200 career assists, Johnson reached 400 career rebounds, and Gayle surpassed 1,200 career points.

==== Illinois ====
On February 27, Michigan defeated No. 10 Illinois, 84–70, to claim the Big Ten conference regular season title outright. It was Michigan's first undisputed outright title since 2014. Michigan secured an outright championship in 2021, though 2020–21 Illinois disputed the Big Ten's determination and claimed a share due to the Wolverines three cancelled games. Michigan was led by Johnson Jr. with 19 points and 11 rebounds, recording his eighth double-double of the season against his former team. Two others scored in double figures, Mara had 19 points on 8-for-9 shooting from the field, and Lendeborg added 16 points and seven rebounds. Cason suffered a torn ACL and would miss the remainder of the season. The win marked the first time Michigan had defeated Illinois since January 10, 2019, snapping a nine-game losing streak. The victory set a program record for Big Ten conference wins with 17, surpassing the previous record of 16 by the 1976–77 and 1984–85 Wolverines. The win was also their 13th consecutive Big Ten victory, tying the 1964–65 Wolverines for the second most in program history, and the sixth time Michigan had defeated an AP top-25 team by double digits this season.

=== March ===
==== Iowa ====
On March 5, Michigan defeated Iowa, 71–68. Michigan was led by Lendeborg and Johnson Jr. with 16 points each. Two others scored in double figures, Mara had 14 points and eight rebounds and Cadeau added 11 points and nine assists. The game was tied 30–30 at halftime, marking the first time Michigan was tied at halftime this season. Michigan had a ten point lead late in the second half, before Iowa used an 11–1 run to tie the game at 64 with 1:57 left. With Michigan up 68–66 in the final seconds, Gayle Jr. had a block and defensive rebound, however, a Michigan turnover on the inbound play gave Iowa the ball back. Gayle Jr. recorded a steal with seven seconds left, setting up two Lendeborg free throws to secure the victory. With the win, Michigan went undefeated in conference road games for the first time in program history and became the first Big Ten team since the 1975–76 Indiana Hoosiers to accomplish this feat. They also became the first Big Ten team to have ever won all ten conference road games. Their 18 conference wins tied the Big Ten record held by the 1974–75 and 1975–76 Indiana Hoosiers.

==== Michigan State ====
On March 8, Michigan defeated No. 8 Michigan State, 90–80, in their rivalry rematch. Michigan was led by Lendeborg with 27 points, on a career-high tying five three-pointers. Four others scored in double figures, Johnson Jr. with 18 points, Gayle Jr. had 15 points, McKenney added 12 points, and Burnett scored ten points. Michigan swept Michigan State for the first time since the 2013–14 Wolverines. With the win, Michigan earned its fifth regular-season victory against an AP top-10 opponent, tying the program record for a single season with the 1964–65 Wolverines. The win set a Big Ten record for conference wins with 19, surpassing the previous record of 18 set twice by the 1974–75 and 1975–76 Indiana Hoosiers. The victory also set a program record for wins in the regular season with 29, surpassing the previous record of 27 set by the 1985–86 Wolverines.

== Postseason ==
=== Big Ten tournament ===
Michigan earned the No. 1 seed in the 2026 Big Ten tournament as the defending champions in 2025. They received a triple-bye in the first year of a full 18-team tournament, which took place at the United Center in Chicago from March 10 until March 15.

==== Quarterfinal ====
On March 13, Michigan defeated Ohio State in the quarterfinal, 71–67. It was the first time the Wolverines ever defeated their rival three times in a season. They also became the sixth team in program history to reach 30 wins in a season, and the first since the 2018–19 Wolverines. Michigan was led by Mara with 17 points and seven rebounds. Three others scored in double figures, Cadeau added 15 points, seven assists and three steals, McKenney scored 12 points and Johnson Jr. had 11 points and seven rebounds. Michigan led by as many as 11 points with six and a half minutes remaining, before Ohio State used a 7–0 run to finish the half, giving the Wolverines a 39–35 lead at halftime. The Buckeyes opened the second half with four consecutive field goals to tie the game, 44–44. Ohio State went on to take their first lead of the game on a three-pointer with 5:40 remaining, capitalizing on a six-minute Michigan field goal drought. Johnson Jr. ended the drought moments later when a driving attempt was ruled a goaltending violation, giving Michigan the lead again. The Buckeyes pulled within two points after a basket with six seconds remaining, however, Lendeborg secured the win with two free throws. Michigan's defense forced Ohio State to miss eight of its final nine field-goal attempts over the closing minutes.

==== Semifinal ====
On March 14, Michigan defeated No. 23 Wisconsin in the semifinal, 68–65, officially defeating every team in the Big Ten this season. The Wolverines advanced to the Big Ten Championship for a seventh time in program history, and for a second consecutive year (fifth time in the last nine tournaments). They also set a program record with their ninth win against an AP ranked opponent. Michigan was led by Mara with 16 points, eight rebounds and five blocks; the most blocks in program history in a Big Ten tournament game. Three others scored in double figures, Cadeau scored 15 points, Lendeborg had 12 points and McKenney added 10 points. The Wolverines started the first half going down 26–18, before tying the game 28–28 at halftime. Michigan's 28 first-half points were its lowest first-half total this season. Michigan began the second half strong, taking a 54–39 lead with just under ten minutes remaining. Wisconsin answered with a 23–4 run, including six consecutive three-pointers made by Austin Rapp, to lead 62–58 with just under four minutes to go. Mara went on to make two unanswered field goals to tie the game, and Cadeau hit a three-point shot to take the lead at 45 seconds. Nick Boyd of Wisconsin answered with a three-point make of his own to tie the game, 65–65, with 30 seconds remaining. Lendeborg responded with a game-winning three-point shot with 0.3 seconds remaining.

==== Championship ====
On March 15, Michigan was defeated by No. 18 Purdue in the championship, 80–72, snapping a 17-game win streak against Big Ten opponents. Michigan was led by Lendeborg with 20 points and five rebounds. Three others scored in double figures, Mara had 14 points and seven rebounds, Nimari Burnett added 12 points and Cadeau recorded his second double-double of the season with 10 points and 10 assists. Both teams were tied 38–38 at halftime, before Purdue used an 11–2 run to open the second half; never surrendering the lead.

=== NCAA tournament ===
On March 15, Michigan received the 1-seed in the Midwest region of the 2026 NCAA tournament. It was the fourth time in program history earning a 1-seed. Michigan entered with a 31–3 record, including 18 games against NCAA tournament teams, going 15–3.

==== First Round ====
On March 19, Michigan defeated 16-seed Howard, 101–80, in the first round at KeyBank Center in Buffalo, New York. Michigan was led by Johnson Jr. with 21 points and 10 rebounds, for his eighth double-double of the season, while shooting 8-of-8 from the field. He became only the fifth player in NCAA tournament history to shoot 100% and record at least 20 points and 10 rebounds, and the first to accomplish this feat since 2009. Four others scored in double figures: Mara had 19 points, seven rebounds, six assists and three blocks, Burnett scored 15 points, Roddy Gayle Jr. added 14 points and McKenney had 10 points. After a tightly contested first half and ten made threes by Howard, Michigan led 50–46 at the intermission. The Wolverines pulled away in the second half, using a 12–1 run at the 15 minute mark and another 21–3 run starting at just under ten minutes, to lead by as many as 31 points with 3:27 remaining. Michigan shot a program-record for an NCAA tournament game, 67.2% from the field (65.4% in the first half and 69.0% in the second). It was their ninth 100-point performance of the season, and the first in an NCAA tournament game since the 1991–92 Wolverines scored 102 points against East Tennessee State in the second round in 1992.

==== Second Round ====
On March 21, Michigan defeated 9-seed Saint Louis in the second round, 95–72. They advanced to the Sweet Sixteen for the ninth time in the last 13 NCAA tournaments, tied for the most in that span with Duke and Gonzaga. Michigan was led by Lendeborg with 25 points on 9-of-13 shooting. The four other starters each scored in double figures: Mara had 16 points and four blocks, Johnson Jr. added 15 points and eight rebounds, Cadeau had 12 points and eight assists, and Burnett scored 11 points. Cadeau became the seventh Wolverine to surpass 200 assists in a season, and the first since Zavier Simpson in 2020. After each team exchanged early runs and leads, Michigan entered halftime leading 48–39. Saint Louis stayed within striking distance for the first five minutes of the second half, before Michigan's lead was pushed back to double-digits at eleven minutes and over 20 points at eight minutes remaining. It was the first time in program history Michigan scored at least 95 points in back-to-back NCAA tournament games.

==== Sweet Sixteen ====
On March 27, Michigan defeated 4-seed No. 18 Alabama, 90–77. Michigan was led by Lendeborg with 23 points, 12 rebounds and seven assists. Three others scored in double figures: Cadeau had 17 points and seven assists, McKenney scored 17 points and Gayle Jr added 16 points. Mara recorded two blocks, setting the single-season program record with 98, surpassing Roy Tarpley's record of 97 blocks in 1986. Alabama opened the game going up 11–2, before Michigan answered and took a 14–13 lead. Both teams traded leads in a tightly contested half, with Michigan using a 14–3 run to go up 47–41, before Alabama closed the half on an 8–0 run to lead 49–47 at halftime. The Crimson Tide made nine threes in the half, and the Wolverines made eight. Michigan came out of the intermission strong, using a 28–11 run to start the first ten plus minutes of the second half, going up 75–60. Michigan never surrendered the lead and advanced to their third Elite Eight in the last eight tournaments, and first since 2021. Michigan held Alabama to a season-low 30% field goal percentage. Both teams combined 27 three-pointers are tied for the third most in an NCAA Tournament regional game. The victory marked Michigan's 34th of the season, setting the single-season program record for wins, surpassing the previous record of 33 set by the 2017–18 Wolverines.

==== Elite Eight ====
On March 29, Michigan defeated 6-seed No. 23 Tennessee, 95–62, in the largest margin of victory by any team in a regional final since the Wolverines in 1989. As well as the second-largest margin of victory in program-history in any round, behind only that team. It was the worst loss by Tennessee in an NCAA tournament game and tied for the worst loss of Rick Barnes' career. Michigan was led by Lendeborg with 27 points and seven rebounds. He became the first Michigan player to score at least 20 points in three consecutive NCAA tournament games since Juwan Howard in 1994, and was named the Midwest Regional MVP. Four others scored in double figures: Johnson Jr. and McKenney each had 12 points, Mara scored 11 points, and Burnett had 10 points. Cadeau added 10 assists, and became the first Big Ten player to record at least seven assists in four consecutive NCAA tournament games since Trey Burke in 2013. Cadeau joined Lendeborg and Gayle Jr. on the Midwest All-Region team. After an evenly scored start to the game, Michigan went on 34–10 run to close the first half, including a 21–0 run from eleven minutes until six minutes remaining, to lead 48–26 at halftime. The Wolverines continued expanding their lead to start the second half, going up 30 points with 14 minutes remaining as they cruised to their 35th win of the season and first Final Four since 2018. They held Tennessee to a season-low 19% field goal percentage. It was Michigan's fourth time defeating an AP ranked opponent by 30 points this season.

==== Final Four ====
On April 4, Michigan defeated 1-seed No. 2 Arizona, 91–73, to advance to the national championship game for the first time since 2018. Michigan was led by Mara with a career-high 26 points, nine rebounds, three assists, and two blocks. Four others scored in double figures: McKenney had 16 points on four three-pointers, Cadeau had 13 points, 10 assists, five rebounds and four steals, Lendeborg scored 11 points in 14 minutes, and Johnson Jr. added 10 points. Cadeau recorded the program's first point-assist double-double in the NCAA tournament since Derrick Walton Jr. in 2017. The Wolverines opened the game on a 10–1 scoring run, extending their lead to double-digits five and a half minutes into the game, and never trailed. Within the first ten minutes, Michigan led 23–10, giving Arizona their largest deficit of the season. Lendeborg landed on Motiejus Krivas' foot, spraining his ankle and MCL in the first half. Following his injury, Arizona used an 11–2 run to reduce Michigan's lead to seven points with 7:21 remaining in the half. Michigan then used two 7–0 runs to close the half, leading 48–32 at halftime. Lendeborg returned in the second half and made two three-pointers, followed by two three-pointers by McKenney, giving Michigan a 59–39 lead with 14:35 remaining. From Lendeborg's second three until the 8:38 mark, Michigan made 11-of-13 shot attempts and held an 81–55 lead. Michigan made three field goals in the final seven and a half minutes of the game and Arizona made four field goals while attempting twice as many shots. The Wolverines shot 57.1 percent from the field, including 63.6 percent in the second half. They held Arizona to a season-low 35% field goal percentage for the game. Michigan's 18-point win is tied for the largest between No. 1 seeds in an NCAA men's tournament game since seeding began in 1979. Michigan became the first team in NCAA tournament history to score at least 90 points in five consecutive games in a single tournament. They won by double-digits and made at least ten threes in each game. In fact, no team had ever scored 90+ points five times in a single tournament, consecutive or not.

==== National Championship ====
On April 6, Michigan defeated 2-seed No. 7 UConn, 69–63, to win their second national championship and the first since 1989. Michigan was the first team to appear in a national championship game with a starting lineup composed entirely of transfers. They were also the first team whose top-four leading scorers during the season were transfers in their first year with the program. The UConn team included former Wolverine transfer, Tarris Reed. Michigan was led by Cadeau with 19 points, who was awarded the NCAA tournament's Most Outstanding Player. Two others scored in doubles figures: Lendeborg with 13 points and Johnson Jr. had a double-double with 12 points and 10 rebounds. Mara finished his single-season program record for blocks with 103 and set an additional single-season record with a 66.8% field goal percentage, passing Loy Vaught's mark of 66.1% in 1989. He ranked third in NCAA DI in blocks and fourth in field goal percentage. Mara joined Cadeau and Johnson Jr. on the Final Four All-Tournament team. Michigan improved upon their program-record, defeating a 13th AP ranked opponent this season and became the first Big Ten team to win the national championship since Michigan State in 2000. Fourteen Big Ten teams reached the Final Four without winning in between championships. Michigan finished the season with a program-record and NCAA-leading 37 wins, and tied the 2004–05 Illinois Fighting Illini for the most wins in a single-season by any Big Ten team. Michigan held UConn to a season-low 31% field goal percentage, which marked the fourth consecutive game that they held their opponent to a season low. Michigan's 541 total points is the third highest tournament total and the second-highest total by a national champion, behind only UNLV in 1990. Michigan's 29-win differential from two seasons prior is the highest since the advent of the NCAA tournament. The improvement made Michigan the first program to go from 10 or fewer wins to a national championship in two seasons since Michigan State in 1979. Michigan finished with a +713 single-season point differential, which is a Big Ten record.

== Schedule and results ==
Date time, TV	Rank^{#}	Opponent^{#}	Result	Record	High points	High rebounds	High assists	Site (attendance) city, state
Exhibition
October 17, 2025*; 6:00 p.m., B1G+	No. 7	Cincinnati	L 98–100	–	31 – Lendeborg	12 – Lendeborg	7 – Cadeau	Crisler Center (10,166); Ann Arbor, MI
October 25, 2025*; 7:00 p.m., B1G+	No. 7	at No. 5 St. John's	W 96–94 ^{OT}	–	25 – Lendeborg	10 – Lendeborg	9 – Cadeau	Madison Square Garden (13,287); New York, NY
Regular season
November 3, 2025*; 8:30 p.m., FS1	No. 7	Oakland	W 121–78	1–0	24 – Johnson Jr.	12 – Mara	14 – Cadeau	Crisler Center (11,801); Ann Arbor, MI
November 11, 2025*; 6:30 p.m., FS1	No. 6	vs. Wake Forest; Wolverine-Deacon Challenge	W 85–84 ^{OT}	2–0	18 – Mara	13 – Mara	7 – Cadeau	Little Caesars Arena (7,362); Detroit, MI
November 14, 2025*; 9:00 p.m., ESPN2	No. 6	at TCU	W 67–63	3–0	14 – Lendeborg	12 – Johnson Jr.	6 – Gayle Jr.	Schollmaier Arena (6,426); Fort Worth, TX
November 19, 2025*; 6:30 p.m., BTN	No. 7	Middle Tennessee	W 86–61	4–0	25 – Lendeborg	12 – Lendeborg	3 – Tied	Crisler Center (11,188); Ann Arbor, MI
November 24, 2025*; 10:30 p.m., TruTV	No. 7	vs. San Diego State; Players Era Festival Game 1	W 94–54	5–0	15 – Lendeborg	8 – Mara	4 – Lendeborg	Michelob Ultra Arena (3,596); Las Vegas, NV
November 25, 2025*; 8:30 p.m., TNT	No. 7	vs. No. 21 Auburn; Players Era Festival Game 2	W 102–72	6–0	17 – Tied	8 – Mara	4 – Lendeborg	Michelob Ultra Arena (3,837); Las Vegas, NV
November 26, 2025*; 9:30 p.m., TNT	No. 7	vs. No. 12 Gonzaga; Players Era Festival Championship	W 101–61	7–0	20 – Lendeborg	11 – Lendeborg	13 – Cadeau	MGM Grand Garden Arena (3,947); Las Vegas, NV
December 6, 2025; 4:00 p.m., BTN	No. 3	Rutgers	W 101–60	8–0 (1–0)	22 – Johnson Jr.	11 – Mara	9 – Cadeau	Crisler Center (12,707); Ann Arbor, MI
December 9, 2025*; 6:30 p.m., FS1	No. 2	Villanova	W 89–61	9–0	18 – Cadeau	10 – Johnson Jr.	4 – Cadeau	Crisler Center (12,707); Ann Arbor, MI
December 13, 2025; 8:00 p.m., FOX	No. 2	at Maryland	W 101–83	10–0 (2–0)	29 – Lendeborg	8 – Lendeborg	10 – Cadeau	Xfinity Center (16,675); College Park, MD
December 21, 2025*; 4:00 p.m., Peacock	No. 2	La Salle	W 102–50	11–0	17 – McKenney	10 – Mara	5 – Lendeborg	Crisler Center (12,707); Ann Arbor, MI
December 29, 2025*; 7:00 p.m., B1G+	No. 2	McNeese	W 112–71	12–0	24 – Johnson Jr.	11 – Johnson Jr.	5 – Mara	Crisler Center (12,707); Ann Arbor, MI
January 2, 2026; 7:00 p.m., Peacock	No. 2	No. 24 USC	W 96–66	13–0 (3–0)	29 – Johnson Jr.	6 – Tied	7 – Cadeau	Crisler Center (12,707); Ann Arbor, MI
January 6, 2026; 7:00 p.m., FS1	No. 2	at Penn State	W 74–72	14–0 (4–0)	14 – Cason	7 – Tied	4 – Tied	Bryce Jordan Center (5,491); State College, PA
January 10, 2026; 1:00 p.m., CBS	No. 2	Wisconsin	L 88–91	14–1 (4–1)	19 – Cadeau	6 – Tied	3 – Cadeau	Crisler Center (12,707); Ann Arbor, MI
January 14, 2026; 10:30 p.m., BTN	No. 4	at Washington	W 82–72	15–1 (5–1)	20 – Mara	16 – Johnson Jr.	6 – Cadeau	Alaska Airlines Arena (9,294); Seattle, WA
January 17, 2026; 4:00 p.m., NBC	No. 4	at Oregon	W 81–71	16–1 (6–1)	17 – Cadeau	10 – Lendeborg	5 – Cadeau	Matthew Knight Arena (8,750); Eugene, OR
January 20, 2026; 7:00 p.m., Peacock	No. 3	Indiana	W 86–72	17–1 (7–1)	19 – Cadeau	8 – Johnson Jr.	4 – Lendeborg	Crisler Center (12,707); Ann Arbor, MI
January 23, 2026; 8:00 p.m., FOX	No. 3	Ohio State; Rivalry	W 74–62	18–1 (8–1)	18 – Lendeborg	9 – Lendeborg	8 – Cadeau	Crisler Center (12,707); Ann Arbor, MI
January 27, 2026; 7:00 p.m., Peacock	No. 3	No. 5 Nebraska	W 75–72	19–1 (9–1)	17 – Johnson Jr.	12 – Johnson Jr.	7 – Cadeau	Crisler Center (12,707); Ann Arbor, MI
January 30, 2026; 8:00 p.m., FOX	No. 3	at No. 7 Michigan State; Rivalry	W 83–71	20–1 (10–1)	26 – Lendeborg	13 – Lendeborg	6 – Cadeau	Breslin Center (14,797); East Lansing, MI
February 5, 2026; 6:30 p.m., FS1	No. 2	Penn State	W 110–69	21–1 (11–1)	31 – Burnett	8 – Johnson Jr.	8 – Tied	Crisler Center (12,707); Ann Arbor, MI
February 8, 2026; 1:00 p.m., CBS	No. 2	at Ohio State; Rivalry	W 82–61	22–1 (12–1)	24 – Mara	14 – Lendeborg	6 – Cadeau	Value City Arena (17,684); Columbus, OH
February 11, 2026; 8:30 p.m., BTN	No. 2	at Northwestern	W 87–75	23–1 (13–1)	18 – Cason	12 – Lendeborg	7 – Tied	Welsh–Ryan Arena (7,039); Evanston, IL
February 14, 2026; 12:45 p.m., CBS	No. 2	UCLA	W 86–56	24–1 (14–1)	17 – Lendeborg	8 – Tied	5 – Cadeau	Crisler Center (12,707); Ann Arbor, MI
February 17, 2026; 6:30 p.m., Peacock	No. 1	at No. 7 Purdue	W 91–80	25–1 (15–1)	17 – Cadeau	11 – Tied	7 – Tied	Mackey Arena (14,876); West Lafayette, IN
February 21, 2026*; 6:30 p.m., ESPN	No. 1	vs. No. 3 Duke; Rivalry / College GameDay / Capital Showcase	L 63–68	25–2	21 – Lendeborg	7 – Lendeborg	6 – Cadeau	Capital One Arena (20,537); Washington, D.C.
February 24, 2026; 8:30 p.m., BTN	No. 3	Minnesota	W 77–67	26–2 (16–1)	15 – Cadeau	7 – Tied	5 – Cadeau	Crisler Center (12,707); Ann Arbor, MI
February 27, 2026; 8:00 p.m., FOX	No. 3	at No. 10 Illinois	W 84–70	27–2 (17–1)	19 – Tied	11 – Johnson Jr.	5 – Cadeau	State Farm Center (15,544); Champaign, IL
March 5, 2026; 8:00 p.m., Peacock	No. 3	at Iowa	W 71–68	28–2 (18–1)	16 – Tied	8 – Tied	9 – Cadeau	Carver–Hawkeye Arena (13,854); Iowa City, IA
March 8, 2026; 4:30 p.m., CBS	No. 3	No. 8 Michigan State; Rivalry	W 90–80	29–2 (19–1)	27 – Lendeborg	7 – Tied	3 – Tied	Crisler Center (12,707); Ann Arbor, MI
Big Ten Tournament
March 13, 2026; 12:00 p.m., BTN	(1) No. 3	vs. (8) Ohio State; Quarterfinal / rivalry	W 71–67	30–2	17 – Mara	7 – Tied	7 – Cadeau	United Center (18,988); Chicago, IL
March 14, 2026; 1:00 p.m., CBS	(1) No. 3	vs. (5) No. 23 Wisconsin; Semifinal	W 68–65	31–2	16 – Mara	8 – Mara	3 – Tied	United Center (17,923); Chicago, IL
March 15, 2026; 3:30 p.m., CBS	(1) No. 3	vs. (7) No. 18 Purdue; Championship	L 72–80	31–3	20 – Lendeborg	7 – Mara	10 – Cadeau	United Center (16,807); Chicago, IL
NCAA tournament
March 19, 2026*; 7:30 p.m., CBS	(1 MW) No. 3	vs. (16 MW) Howard; First round	W 101–80	32–3	21 – Johnson Jr.	10 – Johnson Jr.	9 – Cadeau	KeyBank Center (17,213); Buffalo, NY
March 21, 2026*; 12:10 p.m., CBS	(1 MW) No. 3	vs. (9 MW) Saint Louis; Second round	W 95–72	33–3	25 – Lendeborg	8 – Johnson Jr.	8 – Cadeau	KeyBank Center (17,499); Buffalo, NY
March 27, 2026*; 7:35 p.m., TBS	(1 MW) No. 3	vs. (4 MW) No. 18 Alabama; Sweet Sixteen	W 90–77	34–3	23 – Lendeborg	12 – Lendeborg	7 – Tied	United Center (21,508); Chicago, IL
March 29, 2026*; 2:15 p.m., CBS	(1 MW) No. 3	vs. (6 MW) No. 23 Tennessee; Elite Eight	W 95–62	35–3	27 – Lendeborg	7 – Tied	10 – Cadeau	United Center (20,410); Chicago, IL
April 4, 2026*; 9:19 p.m., TBS	(1 MW) No. 3	vs. (1 W) No. 2 Arizona; Final Four	W 91–73	36–3	26 – Mara	9 – Mara	10 – Cadeau	Lucas Oil Stadium (72,111); Indianapolis, IN
April 6, 2026*; 8:50 p.m., TBS	(1 MW) No. 3	vs. (2 E) No. 7 UConn; National Championship	W 69–63	37–3	19 – Cadeau	10 – Johnson Jr.	2 – Tied	Lucas Oil Stadium (70,720); Indianapolis, IN
*Non-conference game. ^{#}Rankings from AP poll. (#) Tournament seedings in parentheses. MW=Midwest. W=West. E=East. All times are in Eastern Time. Source:

== Statistics ==
Individual player statistics
			Minutes		Scoring		Total FGs			3-point FGs			Free-Throws			Rebounds							
Player	GP	GS	Tot	Avg	Pts	Avg	FG	FGA	Pct	3FG	3FA	Pct	FT	FTA	Pct	Off	Def	Tot	Avg	Ast	Stl	Blk	TO
Burnett, Nimari	40	40	792	19.8	329	8.2	112	247	.453	60	160	.375	45	58	.776	23	87	110	2.8	47	23	4	26
Cadeau, Elliot	40	40	1085	27.1	420	10.5	136	331	.411	65	173	.376	83	117	.709	12	97	109	2.7	234	34	8	96
Johnson Jr., Morez	40	40	1004	25.1	524	13.1	195	313	.623	12	35	.343	122	156	.782	100	193	293	7.3	48	27	44	53
Lendeborg, Yaxel	40	39	1208	30.2	603	15.1	200	388	.515	67	180	.372	136	165	.825	75	196	271	6.8	129	45	49	42
Mara, Aday	40	39	940	23.5	484	12.1	201	301	.668	3	10	.300	79	140	.564	76	194	270	6.8	97	14	103	79
Tschetter, Will	40	1	537	13.4	141	3.5	41	109	.376	29	84	.345	30	33	.909	19	57	76	1.9	25	4	4	12
McKenney, Trey	40	0	885	22.1	397	9.9	126	273	.462	68	174	.391	77	86	.895	16	94	110	2.8	35	16	2	36
Gayle Jr., Roddy	39	1	823	21.1	286	7.3	101	218	.463	21	66	.318	63	84	.750	34	94	128	3.3	52	28	20	50
Cason, L.J.	28	0	519	18.5	234	8.4	81	161	.503	33	82	.402	39	55	.709	6	46	52	1.9	66	26	0	48
Goodman, Oscar	16	0	86	5.4	22	1.4	10	24	.417	0	6	.000	2	5	.400	6	14	20	1.2	7	1	3	4
Kordel, Malick	14	0	60	4.3	17	1.2	8	14	.571	0	1	.000	1	5	.200	6	15	21	1.5	2	1	5	2
Grady, Winters	9	0	56	6.2	26	2.9	7	20	.350	6	19	.316	6	7	.857	0	10	10	1.1	2	2	0	6
Eisley Jr., Howard	9	0	12	1.3	3	0.3	1	5	.200	1	5	.200	0	2	.000	0	1	1	0.1	0	1	0	0
May, Charlie	8	0	18	2.2	7	0.9	2	4	.500	2	3	.667	1	2	.500	1	2	3	0.4	1	1	0	3
Team total	40		8025		3493	87.3	1221	2408	.507	367	998	.368	684	915	.748	433	1170	1603	40.1	745	223	242	468
Opponents	40		8025		2780	69.5	978	2563	.382	330	1085	.304	494	667	.741	459	815	1274	31.9	457	254	120	434
Margin					+713	+17.8	+243	-155	+.125	+37	-87	+.064	+190	+248	+.007	-26	+355	+329	+8.2	+288	-31	+122	+34

Legend
GP	Games played	GS	Games started	Avg	Average per game
FG	Field-goals made	FGA	Field-goal attempts	Off	Offensive rebounds
Def	Defensive rebounds	Ast	Assists	TO	Turnovers
Blk	Blocks	Stl	Steals	Rec	Program record
B1G	Big Ten record

=== 2025–26 NCAA Division I team statistical rankings ===
#1- Total points, total blocks, total scoring margin, total defensive rebounds, and defensive field goal percentage
#2 - Total assists, total rebounds, and blocks per game
#4 - Scoring margin per game

#5 - Assists per game and defensive rebounds per game
#6 - Field goal percentage
#8 - Total rebounding margin
#9 - Points per game
#10 - Rebounding margin per game

== Honors and awards ==
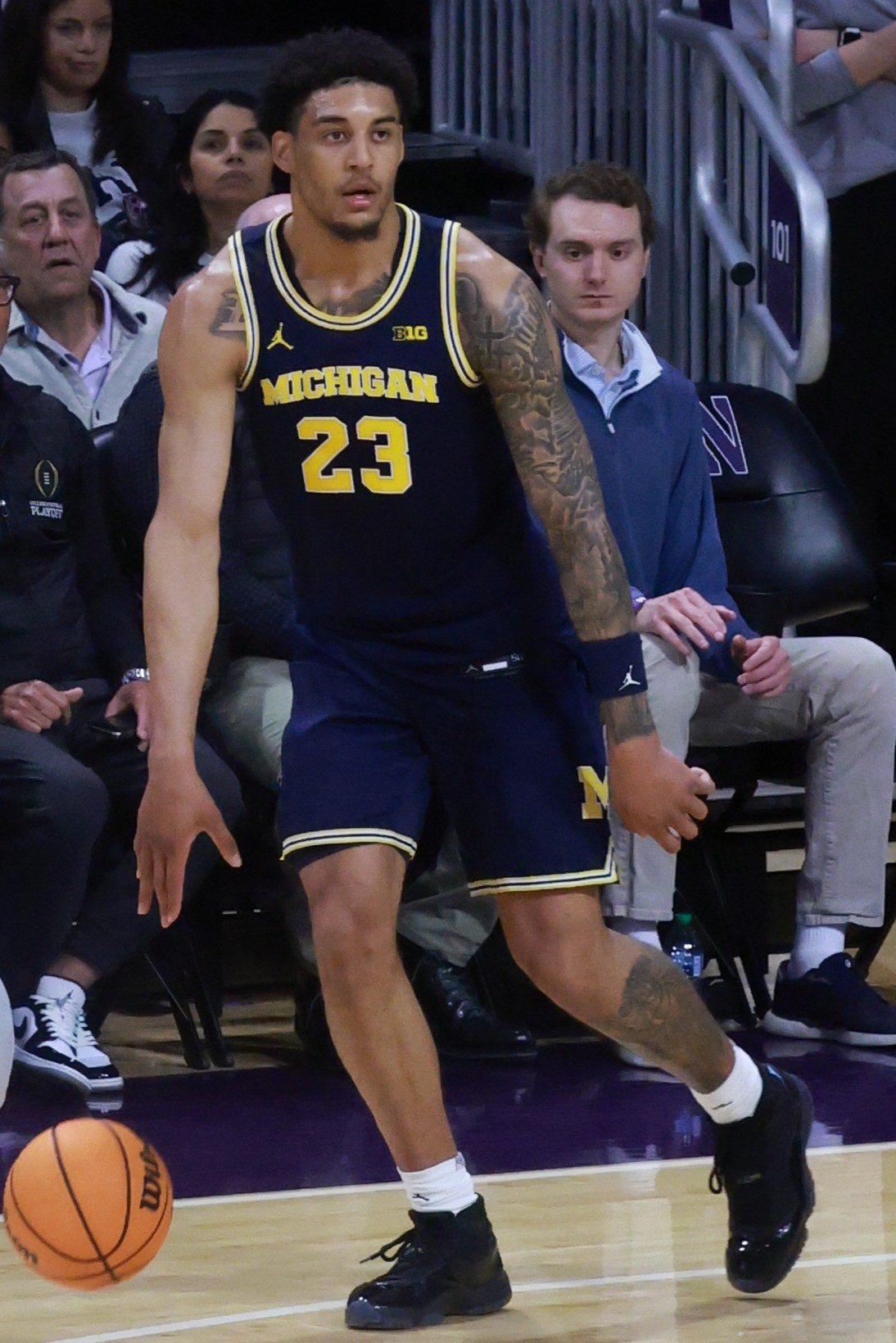
Yaxel Lendeborg, Consensus All-American

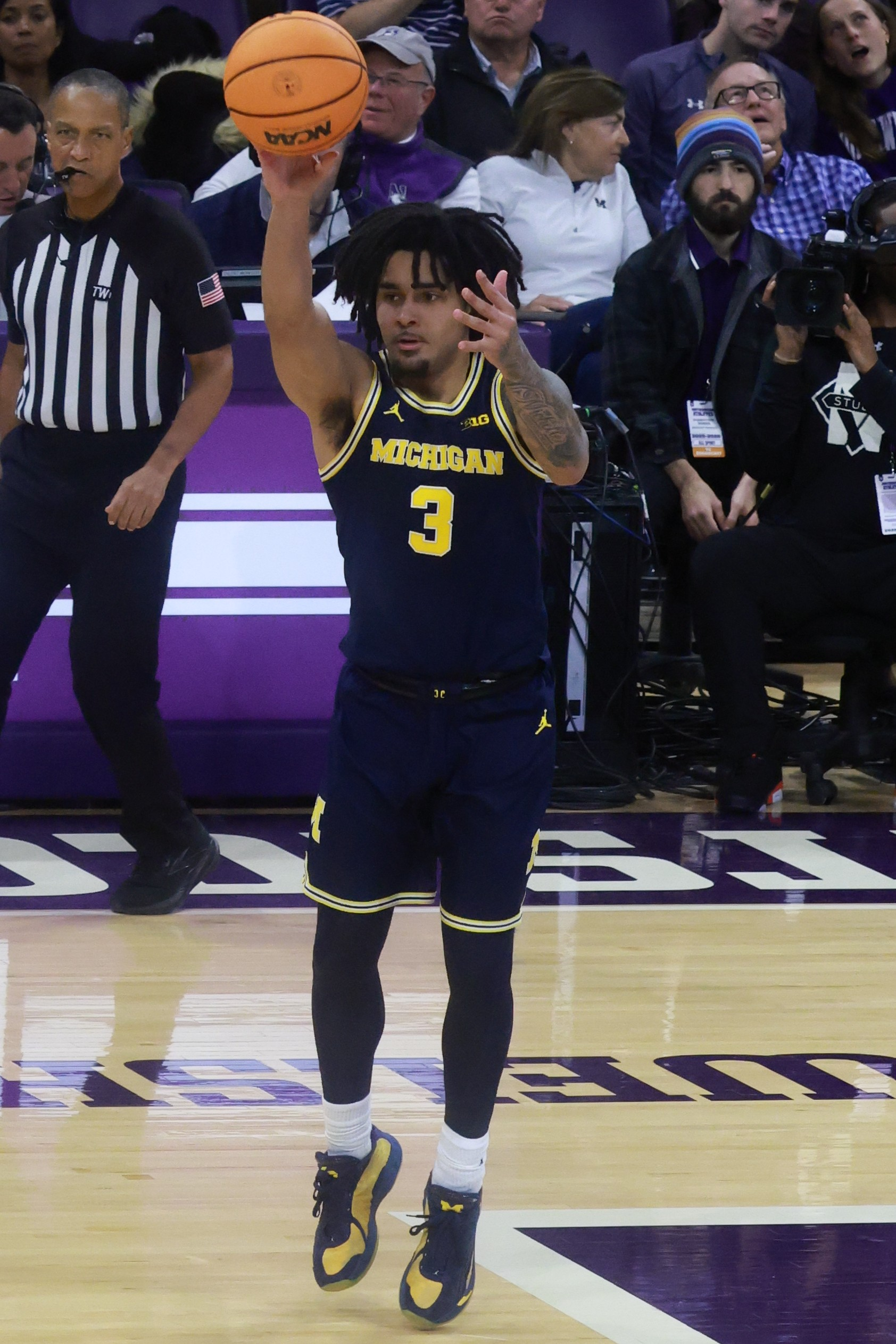
Elliot Cadeau, 2026 NCAA tournament Final Four Most Outstanding Player

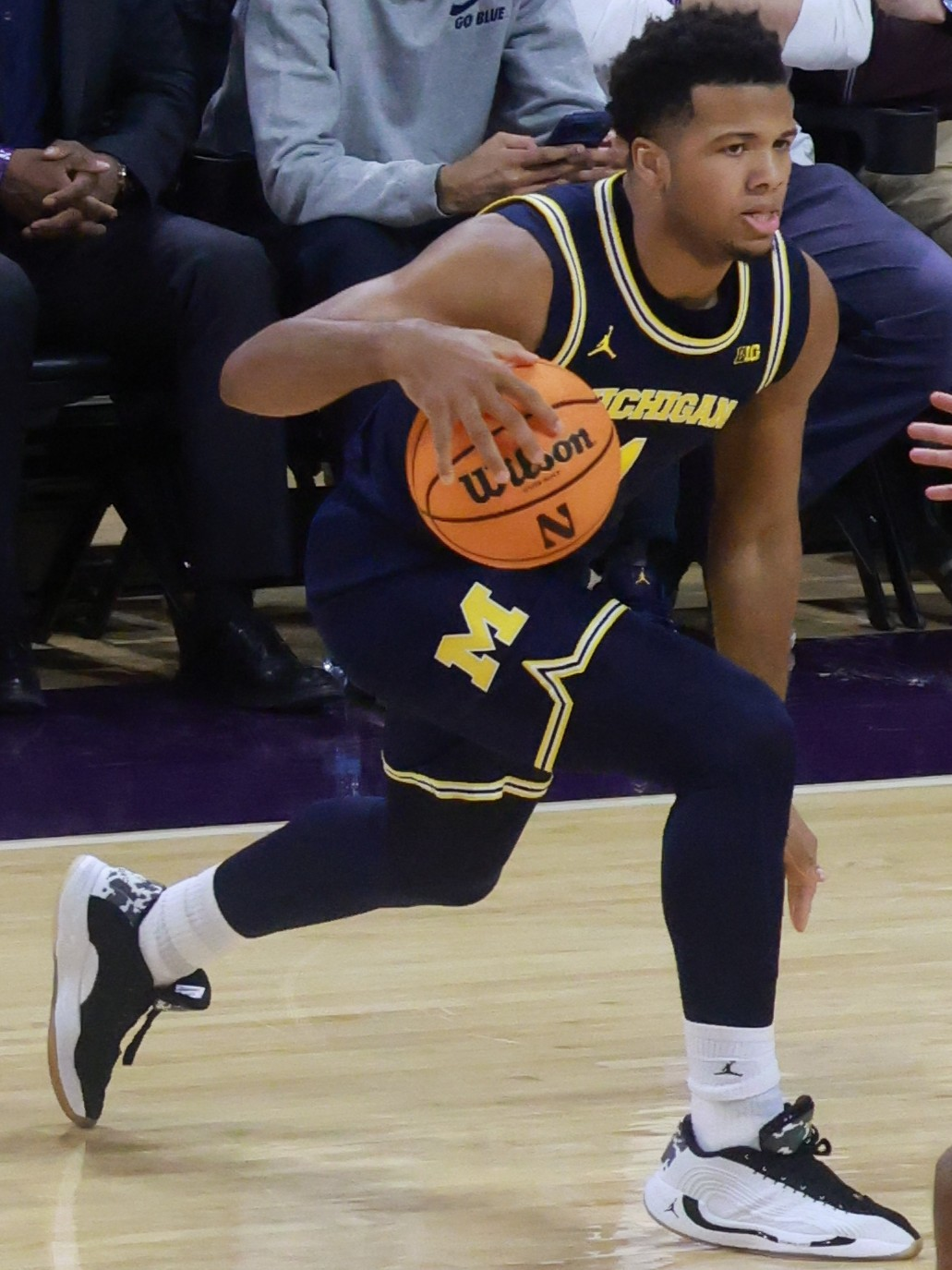
Trey McKenney, Big Ten All-Freshman team

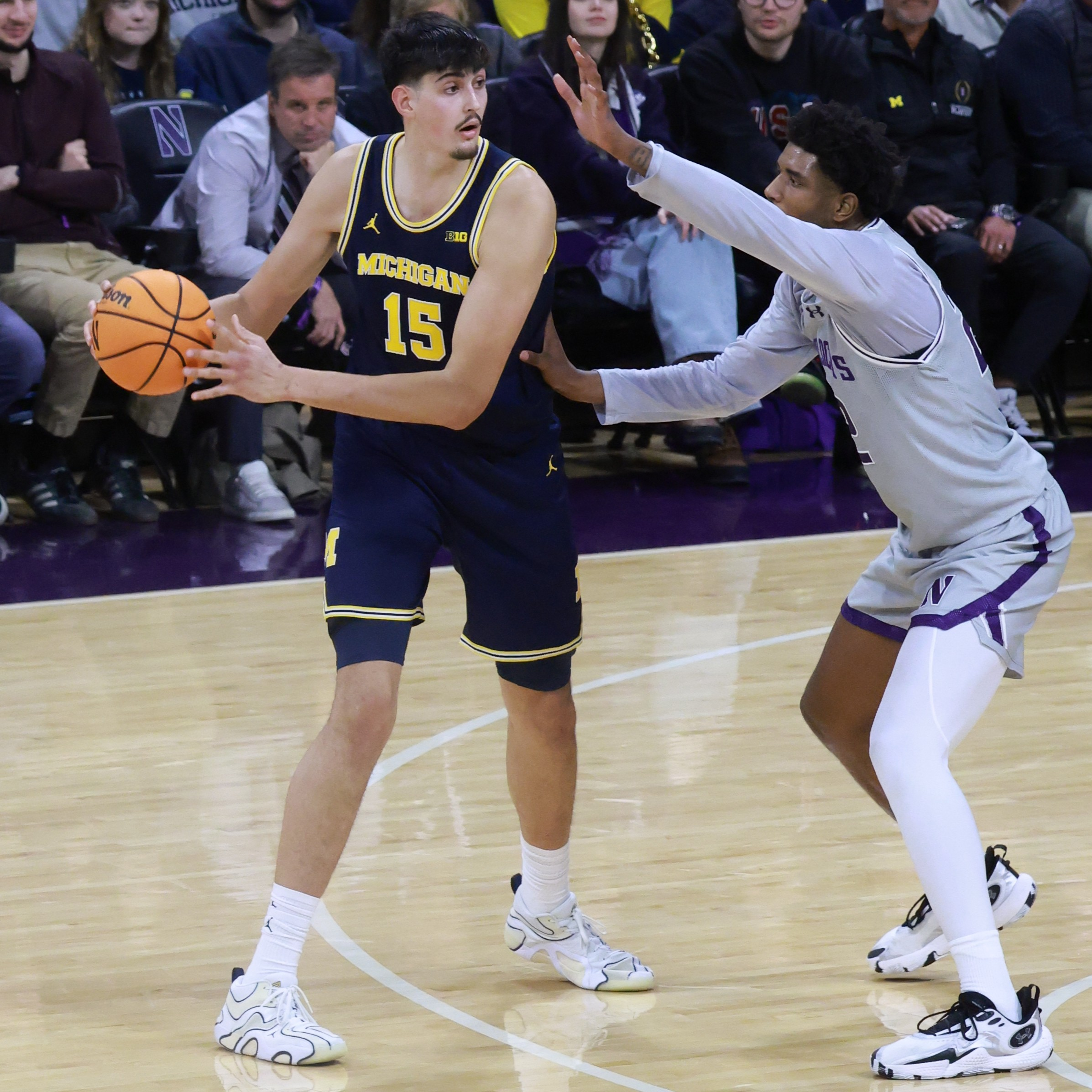
Aday Mara, Big Ten Defensive Player of the Year

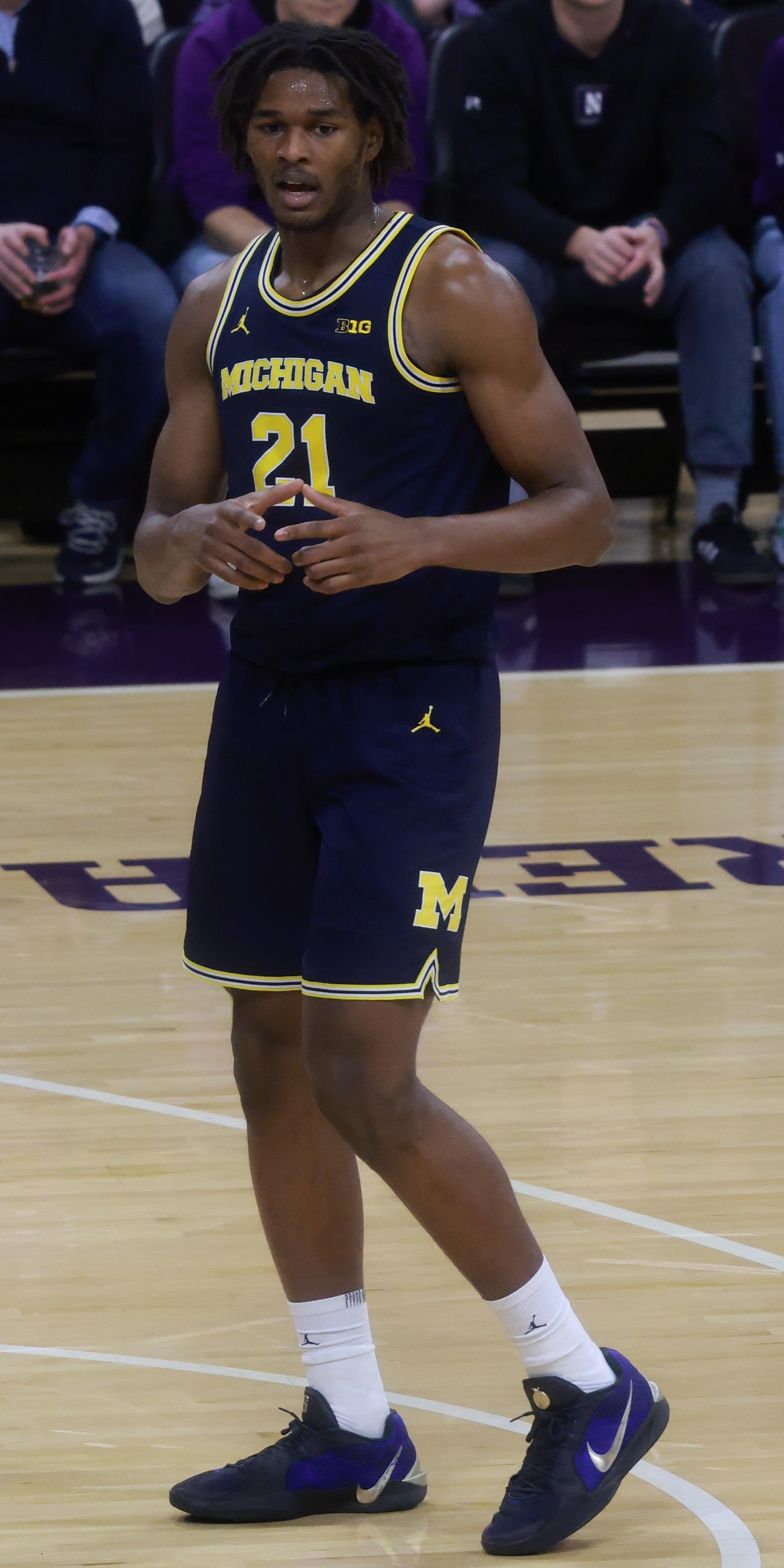
Morez Johnson Jr., NCAA tournament All-Final Four team

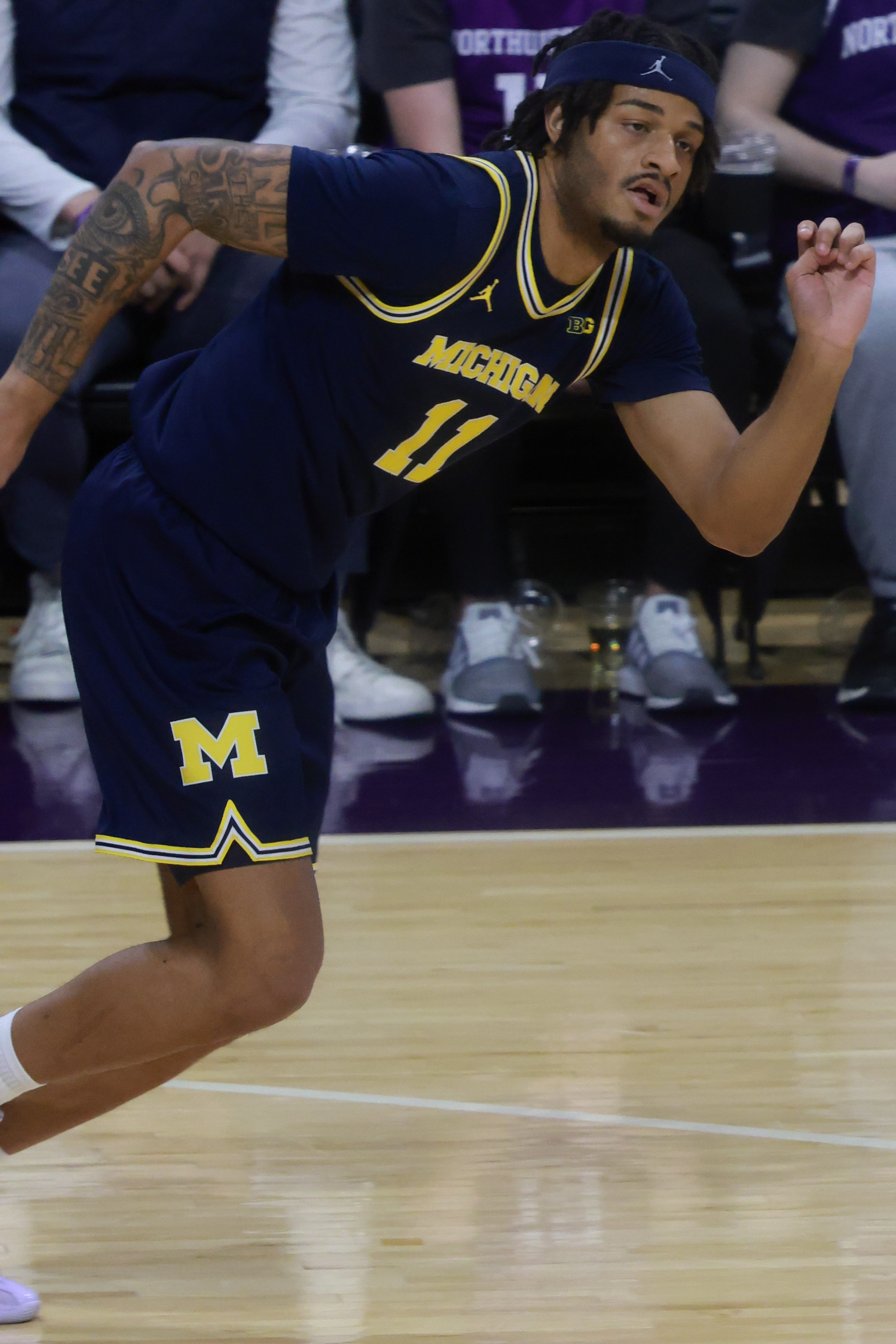
Roddy Gayle Jr., NCAA tournament All-Midwest Region team

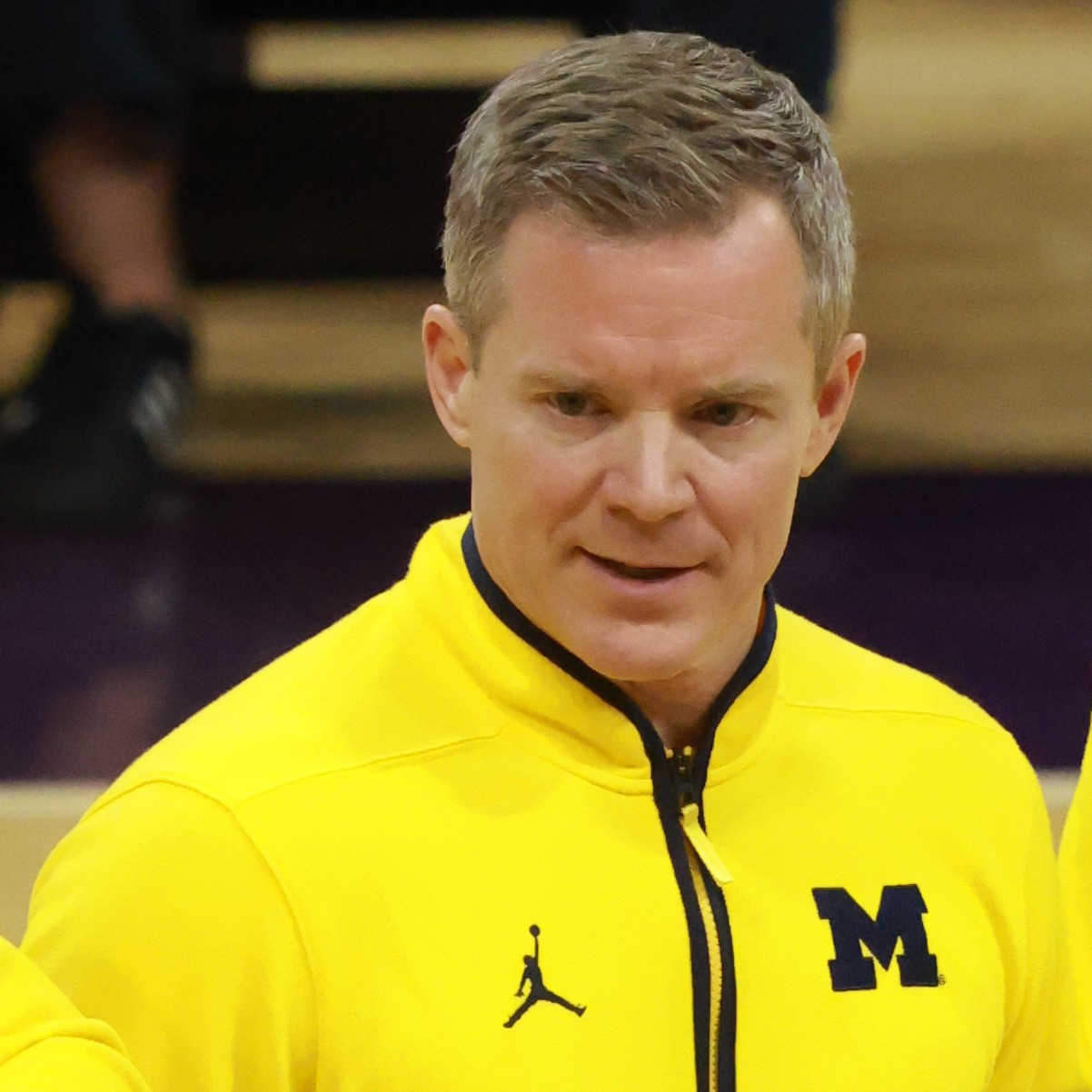
Dusty May earned conference and national coach of the year awards

=== Preseason ===
Yaxel Lendeborg was named Preseason All-Big Ten. He was named a preseason first-team All-American by the Associated Press, Blue Ribbon Yearbook, ESPN, and SB Nation; as well as a second-team selection by CBS Sports, Sports Illustrated, The Sporting News and USA Today. He was Joe Lunardi and SB Nation's preseason National Player of the Year.

=== Regular season ===
Lendeborg was named the Players Era Festival MVP, and selected as Big Ten Conference Player of the Week and the Associated Press National Player of the Week on December 1–2, 2025. Morez Johnson Jr. won the Big Ten Player of the Week on January 5, 2026.

=== Postseason ===
Following the season, Dusty May was named Big Ten Coach of the Year by the media. Lendeborg was named Big Ten Player of the Year by both the coaches and media, Michigan's first player of the year honoree since Nik Stauskas in 2014. Lendeborg was also first-team All-Big Ten by the coaches and media, the conference's only unanimous first-team selection by the latter, and joined Johnson Jr. and Aday Mara on the Big Ten All-Defensive team. In addition, Mara was named the Big Ten Defensive Player of the Year, joining Gary Grant as the second Wolverine to ever earn the award (1986 and 1987), and a third-team All-Big Ten selection by both the coaches and media. Johnson Jr. was a second-team All-Big Ten selection by the media and third team by the coaches, Elliot Cadeau received an All-Big Ten honorable mention by the media, and Trey McKenney was selected for the Big Ten All-Freshman team by the coaches (the only selector).

Nationally, May was selected as the coach of the year, given the Henry Iba Award by the U.S. Basketball Writers Association (USBWA). Michigan became the only school to have had three separate coaches win the award, including Johnny Orr in 1976 and Juwan Howard in 2021. Lendeborg was selected as a consensus first-team All-American by the four major selectors: Associated Press, National Association of Basketball Coaches, The Sporting News and USBWA. He became the ninth consensus All-American in Michigan basketball history, 11th all-time selection, and the first since Trey Burke in 2013.

=== Postseason tournaments ===
Mara was selected to the Big Ten All-Tournament team. Cadeau, Lendeborg and Roddy Gayle Jr. were named to the NCAA tournament All-Midwest Region team, with Lendeborg earning the Midwest Region Most Outstanding Player. Following the national championship game, Cadeau, Johnson Jr. and Mara were selected to the NCAA tournament All-Final Four team and Cadeau earned the Final Four Most Outstanding Player.

== Rankings ==
Michigan finished No. 1 in the AP poll for the first time since the 1976–77 Wolverines, which was led by All-American and first-round NBA draft picks, Rickey Green and Phil Hubbard.

Ranking movements Legend: ██ Increase in ranking ██ Decrease in ranking ( ) = First-place votes
	Week																				
Poll	Pre	1	2	3	4	5	6	7	8	9	10	11	12	13	14	15	16	17	18	19	Final
AP	7	6 (1)	7	7	3 (15)	2 (19)	2 (15)	2 (19)	2 (19)	2 (29)	4	3	3	2	2	1 (60)	3	3	3 (1)	3	1 (57)
Coaches	7	5	6	6	2 (6)	1 (17)	1 (16)	1 (20)	1 (20)	1 (24)	3 (1)	2	2	2	2 (1)	1 (31)	3	3	3	3	1 (31)

== NBA draft picks ==
Morez Johnson Jr., Yaxel Lendeborg and Aday Mara were each lottery picks selected within the first 12 selections of the 2026 NBA draft. Michigan became the fifth program since the lottery expanded to 14 teams in 2004 to have three players taken. It was also the only draft that Michigan had three first round selections aside from 1990, tying a program record.

Year	Round	Pick	Overall	Player	NBA club
2026	1	9	9	Morez Johnson Jr.	Dallas Mavericks
2026	1	11	11	Yaxel Lendeborg	Golden State Warriors
2026	1	12	12	Aday Mara	Oklahoma City Thunder

- Dusty May also departed to become the head coach of the Dallas Mavericks of the NBA.
