= Aday Mara =

Spanish basketball player (born 2005)

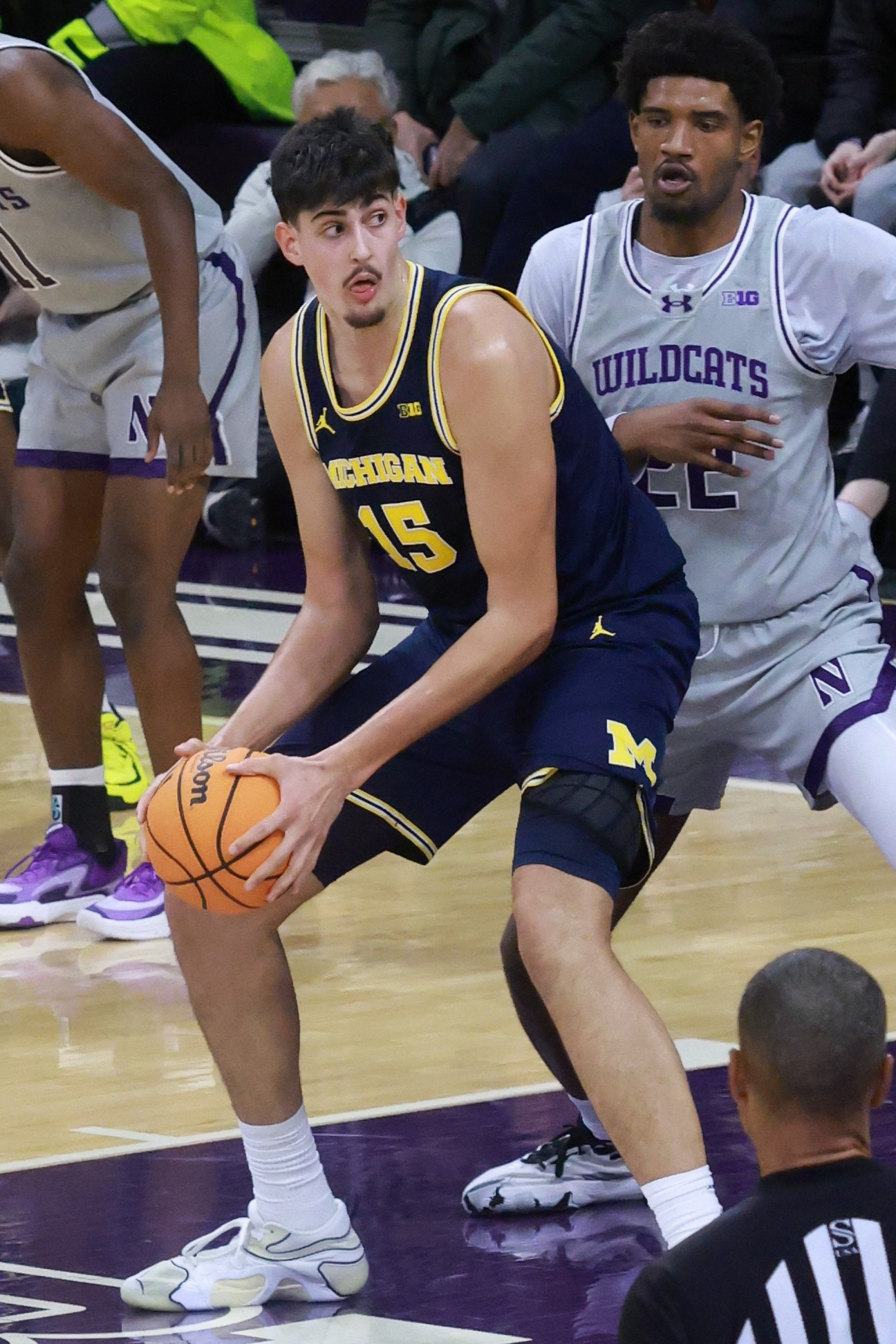
- Mara playing for Michigan in 2026

No. 15 – Oklahoma City Thunder
- Position: Center
- League: NBA

Personal information
- Born: April 7, 2005 (age 21) Zaragoza, Spain
- Listed height: 7 ft 3 in (2.21 m)
- Listed weight: 255 lb (116 kg)

Career information
- College: UCLA (2023–2025); Michigan (2025–2026)
- NBA draft: 2026: 1st round, 12th overall pick
- Drafted by: Oklahoma City Thunder
- Playing career: 2021–present

Career history
- 2021–2023: Basket Zaragoza
- 2021: →CBP Huesca
- 2022: →Anagan Olivar
- 2026–present: Oklahoma City Thunder

Career highlights
- NCAA champion (2026); Third-team All-Big Ten (2026); Big Ten Defensive Player of the Year (2026); Big Ten All-Defensive Team (2026); ACB All-Young Players Team (2023)
- Stats at NBA.com
- Stats at Basketball Reference
Medals
Men's basketball
Representing Spain
FIBA Under-17 World Cup
Silver medal – second place	2022 Spain	Team
FIBA Under-18 EuroBasket
Silver medal – second place	2023 Serbia	Team

Aday Mara Gómez (born April 7, 2005) is a Spanish basketball player for the Oklahoma City Thunder of the National Basketball Association (NBA). He played for Basket Zaragoza from 2021 until 2023, before playing college basketball for the UCLA Bruins (2023–25) and the Michigan Wolverines (2025–26), where he was an NCAA national champion and the Big Ten Defensive Player of the Year in 2026.

== Early life ==
Mara was born and raised in Zaragoza, Spain. His father, Francisco Javier Mara, played basketball professionally for CB Zaragoza from 1986 to 1988. His mother, Angélica "Geli" Gómez, played volleyball on the Spain women's national volleyball team. Mara's father and mother stand at 6 feet 7 inches (201 cm) and 6 feet 3 inches (190 cm) respectively.

== College career ==
=== UCLA ===
On August 3, 2023, the University of California, Los Angeles (UCLA) announced Mara's signing to play college basketball in the United States for the Bruins. He was rated as a five-star recruit and the No. 15 overall prospect in the 2023 class by 247Sports. Casademont Zaragoza contested his move, stating that "contracts must be respected" and warning that they would "take the necessary measures to keep it that way". The dispute led to potential NCAA eligibility issues for Mara, before he was cleared to play for UCLA three days before the start of the 2023–24 season. He was a part-time starter during the season.

In 2024–25, Mara came almost entirely off the bench, but became a major part of the rotation after a breakout game against Wisconsin in late January 2025. He scored a then-career-high 22 points in an 85–83 upset win over the No. 18 Badgers, halting their winning streak at seven. He shot seven-for-seven and added five rebounds, including four offensive, and had two blocks in a then-season-high 21 minutes. Mara followed up with 12 points and seven rebounds along with then-career highs of 30 minutes and five blocks in a win over Washington. His 51 minutes in two games bested his usage in the prior eight contests. In the following game against USC with Tyler Bilodeau out injured, Mara made his only start of the season and recorded his first career double-double with 12 points and 11 rebounds along with five blocks again against UCLA's crosstown rivals. In the 2025 NCAA tournament, he had 10 points, six rebounds, five blocks and two assists in 20 minutes in a 72–47 first-round win over Utah State. He ended the season averaging 6.4 points, 4.0 rebounds and 1.6 blocks in 13.1 minutes. Following his sophomore season, he entered the NCAA transfer portal.

=== Michigan ===
On April 11, 2025, Mara transferred to the University of Michigan to play for head coach Dusty May and the Wolverines. On November 3 against Oakland, he had a double-double in his Michigan debut, recording twelve points, a career-high twelve rebounds, and tying a career high with five blocks. On November 11 against Wake Forest, Mara followed his impressive debut with a second double-double, recording 18 points, a career-high 13 rebounds, a career-high six assists, and again tied his career high with five blocks. With these numbers, he became the second player in history to accumulate more than 30 points, 25 rebounds, 10 blocks and 5 assists in his first two games of a season in the NCAA Division I or NBA, after Tim Duncan who did it in the 2003–04 NBA season with the San Antonio Spurs. On February 5, 2026, Mara posted a career-high six blocks in a 110–69 victory against Penn State, helping Michigan to a school record 21st win before a second loss. On February 8 in a rivalry game victory at Ohio State, Mara had a career-high 24 point effort that included his first two made collegiate three point shots (after never attempting any at UCLA and four misses at Michigan). Mara became the just the fourth NCAA Division I, 7-foot-3-inch (2.2 m) player to make multiple three-point shots in a game since the 2002–03 NCAA season.

Following the regular season, he was named Big Ten Defensive Player of the Year (the second in school history after Gary Grant in 1986 and 1987), as well as an All-Big Ten Defensive Team selection and an All-Big Ten third team selection by both the coaches and media. He was also selected to the 2026 Big Ten All-Tournament team after Michigan finished as runner-up to Purdue. In the Final Four of the 2026 NCAA tournament, Mara scored a career-high 26 points on 11-for-16 shooting, adding nine rebounds and two blocks, as Michigan defeated Arizona, 91–73. On April 6, 2026, the team won the national championship and tied the Big Ten Conference record for single-season wins, 37. Mara was named to the All-Final Four tournament team, along with teammates Morez Johnson Jr. and Elliot Cadeau. On April 24, Mara declared for the 2026 NBA draft.

== Professional career ==
After Mara began to play basketball for Básket Lupus, he joined Zaragoza Basket's youth categories. He was assigned in the lower tiers with Zaragoza's affiliated team Club Baloncesto El Olivar (EBA League). He made his debut in LEB Oro in the also affiliated team Levitec Huesca in a fixture against Tau Castelló in October 2021. On November 17, 2021, Mara made his debut at age 16 with the first team of Casademont Zaragoza in a FIBA Europe Cup fixture against Reggio Emilia, scoring two points. He played in the 2020–21 Euroleague Basketball Next Generation Tournament and averaged 8.5 points, 10.5 rebounds and 3.5 blocks over four games.

Mara was loaned to CB Peñas Huesca of LEB Oro at the start of the 2021–2022 season due to a roster shortage at the club. He averaged 2.7 points, 3.8 rebounds and 0.7 blocks over six games. Mara was then assigned to Anagan Olivar of Liga EBA, the Spanish fourth division, where he averaged 10.8 points, 7.2 rebounds, 1.4 assists and 1.8 blocks per game. Mara made his Liga ACB debut with Zaragoza on October 16, 2022, chipping in eight points, four rebounds, one assist and one block. He also took part in the Basketball Without Borders camp during the 2023 NBA All-Star weekend in Salt Lake City, Utah.

=== Oklahoma City Thunder (2026-present) ===
On June 23, 2026, the Oklahoma City Thunder selected Mara with the twelfth overall pick in the 2026 NBA draft. He became one of the three teammates from the Michigan Wolverines to be drafted in the lottery, joining Morez Johnson Jr. and Yaxel Lendeborg. In the 2026 NBA Summer League, Mara appeared in three games, averaging 8.7 points, 7.7 rebounds, and 3.7 assists. On October 20, Mara made his Thunder debut, putting up seven points, two rebounds, one assist, and one block in a 116–104 win over the San Antonio Spurs. The block was against Victor Wembanyama and resulted in Mara finishing a lob on the other end of the court. With Chet Holmgren sidelined, Mara posted his first double-double (11 points and 10 rebounds) on October 26, as the Thunder extended their record to 4–0 with against the Phoenix Suns. On November 20 in a 126-120 win against the New Orleans Pelicans, Mara recorded his fourth career double double, where he put up a career-high 22 points and 16 rebounds, he also recorded two blocks and assists while shooting on 73.3 percent while only having one turnover in 29 minutes of action.

== National team career ==
Mara played for the Spanish national team at the 2022 FIBA Under-17 Basketball World Cup in Spain. He averaged 12.6 points, 5.0 rebounds and 1.9 blocks per game, as Spain advanced to the final before losing to the United States. He was also on the Spanish national team for the 2023 FIBA U18 European Championship in Serbia, again finishing as the runner-up and earning a silver medal.

== Career statistics ==
Legend
GP	Games played	GS	Games started	MPG	Minutes per game
FG%	Field goal percentage	3P%	3-point field goal percentage	FT%	Free throw percentage
RPG	Rebounds per game	APG	Assists per game	SPG	Steals per game
BPG	Blocks per game	PPG	Points per game	**Bold**	Career high

=== College ===
Year	Team	GP	GS	MPG	FG%	3P%	FT%	RPG	APG	SPG	BPG	PPG
2023–24	UCLA	28	8	9.5	.442	–	.700	1.9	0.5	0.1	0.7	3.5
2024–25	UCLA	33	1	13.1	.590	–	.577	4.0	1.0	0.2	1.6	6.4
2025–26	Michigan	40	39	23.4	.668	.300	.564	6.8	2.4	0.4	2.6	12.1
**Career**		**101**	**48**	**16.2**	**.610**	**.300**	**.585**	**4.5**	**1.4**	**0.2**	**1.7**	**7.8**

== See also ==
- List of tallest players in NBA history
