= Trey McKenney =

American basketball player (born 2006)

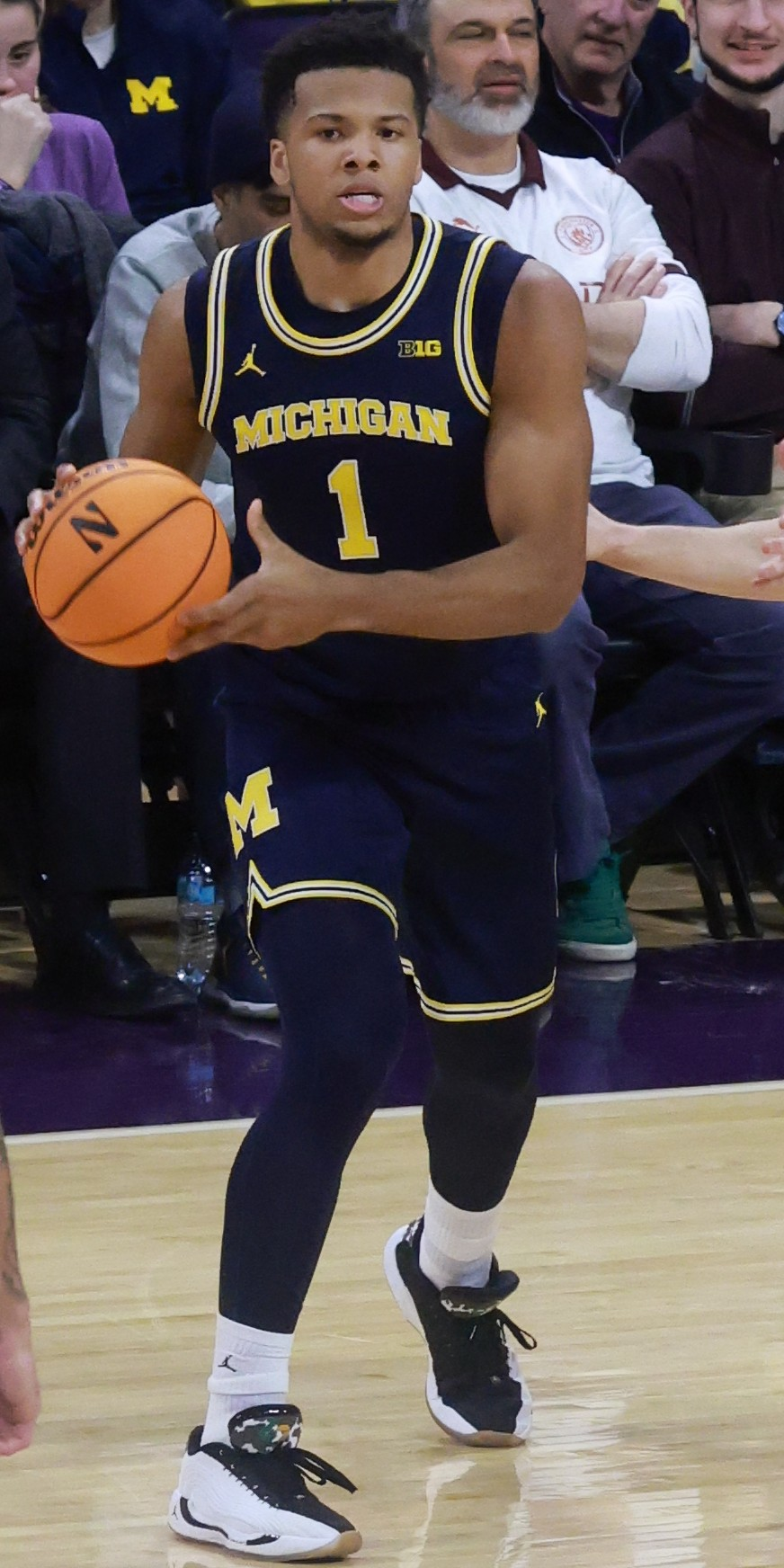
- McKenney for the 2025–26 Michigan Wolverines

No. 1 – Michigan Wolverines
- Position: Shooting guard
- League: Big Ten Conference

Personal information
- Born: September 6, 2006 (age 20) Flint, Michigan, U.S.
- Listed height: 6 ft 4 in (1.93 m)
- Listed weight: 220 lb (100 kg)

Career information
- High school: St. Mary's Preparatory (Orchard Lake Village, Michigan)
- College: Michigan (2025–present)

Career highlights
- NCAA champion (2026); Big Ten All-Freshman Team (2026); McDonald's All-American (2025); Jordan Brand Classic (2025); Nike Hoop Summit (2025); Mr. Basketball of Michigan (2025); 2× Michigan Gatorade Player of the Year (2024, 2025)
Medals
Men's basketball
Representing United States
FIBA Under-18 AmeriCup
Gold medal – first place	2024 Argentina	Team

John "Trey" McKenney III (born September 6, 2006) is an American college basketball player for the Michigan Wolverines of the Big Ten Conference. He was an NCAA national champion and earned Big Ten All-Freshman honors in 2026. As a senior in high school, McKenney represented the United States national team and won a gold medal at the 2024 FIBA Under-18 AmeriCup, was a three-time Michigan Associated Press Division I Player of the Year, Mr. Basketball of Michigan and a McDonald's All-American in 2025.

== Early life and high school ==
McKenney was born on September 6, 2006, the son of Jasmine (Stanley) and John McKenney. He was born in Flint, Michigan, and grew up watching Michigan Wolverines basketball with his father. His maternal grandparents were students at the University of Michigan, and it was always his dream to play there. McKenney's maternal grandfather is Woodrow Stanley, a former Mayor of Flint, and his Aunt, Linnell Jones McKenney, is regarded as Flint's first female professional basketball player. Flint has a strong basketball history, including local high school greats such as Glen Rice, Morris Peterson, Mateen Cleaves and Charlie Bell having played high school ball there. However, by the 21st century, local legends such as Kyle Kuzma, JaVale McGee and Miles Bridges played high school at distant prep schools. McKenney also left the Flint area to attend St. Mary's Preparatory, a residential private school located 45 minutes from Flint.

According to his own Twitter account, McKenney received his 6th NCAA Division 1 scholarship offer (from Illinois) on November 17, 2021, as a freshman. By the end of 2021, he also had offers from Michigan and Alabama. That season St. Mary's captured the Catholic High School League championship. The team was led by Michigan AP first-team selections JaVaughn Hannah and Kareem Rozier, as well as McKenney as a second-team honoree. In June 2022, following his freshman season, his offers list included Alabama, Arizona State, DePaul, Eastern Michigan, Illinois, Indiana, Michigan, Ohio State, TCU, Temple and Texas. As a sophomore, he led St. Mary's to a surprise 2023 MHSAA Division 1 semifinal appearance, despite an 11–10 regular season record and a last place 2–8 division performance. Along the way, the team defeated former number-one ranked Brother Rice, top-ten ranked University of Detroit Jesuit and North Farmington, and defending state champion De La Salle. As a junior, McKenney led St. Mary's to a 27–1 record and the 2024 MHSAA Division 1 state championship, scoring 32 points and 10 rebounds in a victory over North Farmington on March 16. In the game, McKenney made 8-of-11 field goals and all 14 free throws. St. Mary's was the number-one ranked school in the state for the entire season.

Following his junior year, McKenney represented the United States national team at the 2024 FIBA Under-18 AmeriCup in Argentina, winning a gold medal. He started all six games for the undefeated team USA, averaging 10.8 points, 5.3 rebounds, 2.2 assists and 1.3 steals in 18.8 minutes. McKenney finished second on the team in scoring.

On November 9, 2024, McKenney announced his commitment to the University of Michigan via a live broadcast on 247Sports, choosing from his final list that also included Georgetown and USC. As a blue chip five-star recruit, he received over 30 offers and was listed as the 19th best basketball player in the national class of 2025, according to the 247Sports composite ranking at the time of his commitment. ESPN ranked him 16th in the class at the time, but unlike most rankings they listed him second in the state of Michigan. He was listed second because they recognized Darius Acuff as a Michigan native, although he had transferred from Detroit Cass Tech to IMG Academy in Florida as a junior. McKenney and Acuff played together on the same AAU team, The Family, in the Nike Elite Youth Basketball League (EYBL). When they were both sophomores in Michigan with their high school teams, McKenney was the 2023 Michigan Associated Press (AP) Division 1 Player of the Year at St. Mary's. However, when they played together for Team USA, Acuff was the MVP of the 2024 FIBA Under-18 AmeriCup. McKenney won the Michigan AP Player of the Year for a second consecutive season as a junior in 2024. He also was named the Michigan MaxPreps Player of the Year, Michigan Gatorade Player of the Year and the Detroit High School Sports Athlete of the Year. As a junior, he averaged 22.9 points, 10.1 rebounds and 2.5 assists per game.

McKenney entered his senior season as one of the top 25 players in the nation according to Sports Illustrated. In December 2024, at the Motor City Roundball Classic, McKenney became the all-time leading scorer in St. Mary's basketball history, passing former Michigan State guard Kalin Lucas' mark of 1,688 career points. As seniors, McKenney and Acuff met in an interstate matchup, with IMG Academy and St. Mary's playing each other in a closely contested regular season game. St. Mary's led for three quarters before IMG went on to win 67–62. McKenney finished with 37 points on 12-of-17 shooting, with eight made threes, and Acuff was 11-of-19, with 32 points and four made three-point shots. Following the contest against IMG, McKenney found out he broke a metacarpal on his left hand in the third quarter, forcing him to miss multiple games as a result.

In January 2025, McKenney was named a McDonald's All-American. He was the first Michigan signee to be selected since Moussa Diabaté, Caleb Houstan and Kobe Bufkin in 2021, and would be the first to play in the game since Daniel Horton in 2002 (due to the COVID-19 cancellation in 2021). In February 2025, McKenney led St. Mary's to back-to-back Catholic League titles and a third in four years, defeating the No. 1 team in the state, U of D Jesuit. He had a 22 point, 10 rebound performance. In the state playoffs, St. Mary's advanced to the 2025 MHSAA Division 1 semifinals before losing to East Lansing. In March 2025, McKenney was named Mr. Basketball of Michigan. He also repeated as Michigan's Gatorade Player of the Year and MaxPreps Player of the Year in 2025. As well as being awarded Michigan's AP Player of the Year for a third consecutive season. As a senior, he averaged 23.8 points, 10.2 rebounds and 3.0 assists per game, finishing the season shooting 55% from the floor and 42% from three-point range. He finished his high school career at St. Mary's with 1,970 total points scored and a 79–22 overall record (including three straight MHSAA state semifinal appearances).

In addition to the McDonald's All-American game, McKenney was invited to participate in the Nike Hoop Summit and the Jordan Brand Classic. While representing the USA junior national team against the world in the Nike Hoop Summit, McKenney scored 22 points, including nine points in overtime to lead the United States to a victory.

== College career ==
=== Freshman season (2025–26) ===
McKenney enrolled at the University of Michigan in the summer of 2025. On November 3 against Oakland, he scored 21 points in his collegiate debut, shooting 6-of-8 on three point attempts. McKenney led the team with 28 minutes played. In Michigan’s 2025 Players Era Festival championship run, McKenney posted 11 and 17 points, respectively, against No. 21 Auburn and No. 12 Gonzaga. Those wins marked the first time in NCAA history that any team outscored AP poll ranked opponents by 30 or more points in back-to-back games.

On January 2, 2026 against No. 24 USC, McKenney added ten points off the bench as Michigan became the first team to defeat three consecutive AP ranked opponents by at least 30 points. On January 27, McKenney had 11 points off the bench, including the go-ahead basket with 67 seconds remaining against undefeated No. 5 Nebraska in a 75–72 victory. This was part of a stretch of 7 consecutive games concluding on February 11, which he contributed at least 10 points off the bench. This included two rivalry victories against Ohio State, as well as an in-state rivalry victory against No. 7 Michigan State on the road. On February 17, in the 91–80 victory against No. 7 Purdue on the road, McKenney's 13 points on 3-of-4 three-point shooting helped avert a second-half comeback. In the rematch against rival Michigan State, McKenney contributed 12 points in a 90–80 victory. His points all came in the second half, including a crucial 8-point individual run as Michigan boosted a 1-point halftime lead to a 10-point victory. Following the regular season, he was selected to the Big Ten All-Freshman team by the conference coaches (the only selector).

In the 2026 Big Ten tournament first round against Ohio State, McKenney scored 12 points as the Wolverines became the first Michigan team to defeat Ohio State three times in one season. In the Sweet Sixteen round of the 2026 NCAA tournament against No. 18 Alabama, he posted 17 points. He followed that up with 12 points against No. 23 Tennessee in the Elite Eight and 16 points (including 4 three point shots) against 1-seed No. 2 Arizona in the Final Four. The team won the national championship in the NCAA tournament and tied the Big Ten Conference record with 37 single-season wins. In the final two minutes of the national championship game against UConn, McKenney made a crucial three-point shot and two important free throws. Despite not starting, McKenney led the team with 68 three-point shots made for the season.

=== Sophomore season (2026–27) ===
Ahead of his sophomore season, McKenney was selected to the Preseason All-Big Ten team, which featured 11 members. He was joined by teammate Elliot Cadeau as the program’s 25th and 26th players to have ever been selected. He was also selected as a first-team All-Big Ten selection by the media, receiving the fifth most total votes. On November 6, in a championship game rematch against No. 4 UConn, McKenney posted a career-high 22 points, scoring all in the second half.

== Career statistics ==
Legend
GP	Games played	GS	Games started	MPG	Minutes per game
FG%	Field goal percentage	3P%	3-point field goal percentage	FT%	Free throw percentage
RPG	Rebounds per game	APG	Assists per game	SPG	Steals per game
BPG	Blocks per game	PPG	Points per game	**Bold**	Career high

=== College ===
Year	Team	GP	GS	MPG	FG%	3P%	FT%	RPG	APG	SPG	BPG	PPG
2025–26	Michigan	40	0	22.1	.462	.391	.895	2.8	0.9	0.4	0.1	9.9
**Career**		**40**	**0**	**22.1**	**.462**	**.391**	**.895**	**2.8**	**0.9**	**0.4**	**0.1**	**9.9**
