= Indiana Hoosiers men's basketball statistical leaders =

The Indiana Hoosiers men's basketball statistical leaders are individual statistical leaders of the Indiana Hoosiers men's basketball program in various categories, including points, rebounds, assists, steals, and blocks. Within those areas, the lists identify single-game, single-season, and career leaders. The Hoosiers represent Indiana University in the NCAA's Big Ten Conference.

Indiana began competing in intercollegiate basketball in 1901. However, the school's record book does not generally list records from before the 1950s, as records from before this period are often incomplete and inconsistent. Since scoring was much lower in this era, and teams played much fewer games during a typical season, it is likely that few or no players from this era would appear on these lists anyway.

The NCAA did not officially record assists as a stat until the 1983–84 season, and blocks and steals until the 1985–86 season, but Indiana's record books includes players in these stats before these seasons. These lists are updated through the end of the 2021–22 season.

== Scoring ==
Career
Rank	Player	Points	Seasons
1	Calbert Cheaney	2,613	1989–90 1990–91 1991–92 1992–93
2	Steve Alford	2,438	1983–84 1984–85 1985–86 1986–87
3	Trayce Jackson-Davis	2,258	2019–20 2020–21 2021–22 2022-23
4	Don Schlundt	2,192	1951–52 1952–53 1953–54 1954–55
5	A.J. Guyton	2,100	1996–97 1997–98 1998–99 1999–00
6	Mike Woodson	2,061	1976–77 1977–78 1978–79 1979–80
7	Yogi Ferrell	1,986	2012–13 2013–14 2014–15 2015–16
8	Alan Henderson	1,979	1991–92 1992–93 1993–94 1994–95
9	Damon Bailey	1,741	1990–91 1991–92 1992–93 1993–94
10	Kent Benson	1,740	1973–74 1974–75 1975–76 1976–77

Season
Rank	Player	Points	Season
1	Calbert Cheaney	785	1992–93
2	Scott May	752	1975–76
3	Steve Alford	749	1986–87
4	Calbert Cheaney	734	1990–91
5	Alan Henderson	729	1994–95
6	George McGinnis	719	1970–71
7	Mike Woodson	714	1978–79
	Jimmy Rayl	714	1961–62
9	Jay Edwards	680	1988–89
10	Trayce Jackson-Davis	670	2022–23

Single game
Rank	Player	Points	Season	Opponent
1	Jimmy Rayl	56	1962–63	Michigan State
	Jimmy Rayl	56	1961–62	Minnesota
3	Mike Woodson	48	1978–79	Illinois
4	Steve Downing	47	1971–72	Kentucky
	Don Schlundt	47	1954–55	Ohio State
	Don Schlundt	47	1953–54	Ohio State
7	George McGinnis	45	1970–71	Northern Illinois
8	Lamar Wilkerson	44	2025–26	Penn State
	Jimmy Rayl	44	1962–63	Michigan State
	Jimmy Rayl	44	1961–62	Wisconsin

== Rebounds ==
Career
Rank	Player	Rebounds	Seasons
1	Trayce Jackson-Davis	1,143	2019–20 2020–21 2021–22 2022-23
2	Alan Henderson	1,091	1991–92 1992–93 1993–94 1994–95
3	Walt Bellamy	1,087	1958–59 1959–60 1960–61
4	Kent Benson	1,031	1973–74 1974–75 1975–76 1976–77
5	Archie Dees	914	1955–56 1956–57 1957–58
6	Steve Downing	889	1970–71 1971–72 1972–73
7	Ray Tolbert	874	1977–78 1978–79 1979–80 1980–81
8	Don Schlundt	860	1951–52 1952–53 1953–54 1954–55
9	Eric Anderson	826	1988–89 1989–90 1990–91 1991–92
10	Christian Watford	776	2009–10 2010–11 2011–12 2012–13

Season
Rank	Player	Rebounds	Season
1	Walt Bellamy	428	1960–61
2	Steve Downing	377	1971–72
3	George McGinnis	352	1970–71
4	Trayce Jackson-Davis	346	2022-23
5	Archie Dees	345	1957–58
6	D.J. White	341	2007–08
7	Walt Bellamy	335	1958–59
8	Walt Bellamy	324	1959–60
9	Archie Dees	317	1956–57
10	Alan Henderson	308	1993–94

Single game
Rank	Player	Rebounds	Season	Opponent
1	Walt Bellamy	33	1960–61	Michigan
2	Walt Bellamy	28	1960–61	Wisconsin
3	Steve Downing	26	1971–72	Ball State
	Dick Van Arsdale	26	1964–65	Missouri
	Dick Neal	26	1955–56	Wisconsin
6	Steve Downing	25	1971–72	Kentucky
	Archie Dees	25	1956–57	Valparaiso
8	Trayce Jackson-Davis	24	2022-23	Northwestern
9	Kent Benson	23	1974–75	Kentucky
	Steve Downing	23	1971–72	BYU
	George McGinnis	23	1970–71	Michigan
	George McGinnis	23	1970–71	Northwestern

== Assists ==
Career
Rank	Player	Assists	Seasons
1	Yogi Ferrell	633	2012–13 2013–14 2014–15 2015–16
2	Michael Lewis	545	1996–97 1997–98 1998–99 1999–00
3	Quinn Buckner	542	1972–73 1973–74 1974–75 1975–76
4	Tom Coverdale	500	1999–00 2000–01 2001–02 2002–03
5	Jamal Meeks	474	1988–89 1989–90 1990–91 1991–92
	Damon Bailey	474	1990–91 1991–92 1992–93 1993–94
7	Trey Galloway	433	2020-21 2021-22 2022-23 2023-24 2024–25
8	Randy Wittman	432	1978–79 1979–80 1980–81 1981–82 1982–83
9	A.J. Guyton	403	1996–97 1997–98 1998–99 1999–00
10	Stew Robinson	391	1982–83 1983–84 1984–85 1985–86

Season
Rank	Player	Assists	Season
1	Isiah Thomas	197	1980–81
2	Yogi Ferrell	195	2015–16
3	Tom Coverdale	178	2001–02
4	Quinn Buckner	177	1974–75
5	Xavier Johnson	172	2021-22
6	Bobby Wilkerson	171	1975–76
7	Jamal Meeks	168	1990–91
8	Yogi Ferrell	166	2014–15
9	Tom Coverdale	163	2000–01
10	Isiah Thomas	159	1979–80

Single game
Rank	Player	Assists	Season	Opponent
1	Michael Lewis	15	1997–98	Iowa
	Keith Smart	15	1986–87	Auburn
3	Stew Robinson	14	1984–85	Marquette
	Isiah Thomas	14	1980–81	Maryland
	Bobby Wilkerson	14	1975–76	Michigan
	Quinn Buckner	14	1973–74	Illinois
7	Tony Freeman	13	1986–87	Northwestern
	Isiah Thomas	13	1979–80	Iowa
	Bobby Wilkerson	13	1975–76	Northwestern
10	Trey Galloway	12	2023-24	Wisconsin
	Trey Galloway	12	2023-24	Northwestern
	Xavier Johnson	12	2021–22	Purdue
	Tom Coverdale	12	2001–02	Alaska Anchorage
	Jamal Meeks	12	1991–92	Louisville
	Jamal Meeks	12	1990–91	Kentucky
	Isiah Thomas	12	1980–81	St. Joseph's
	Jim Thomas	12	1981–82	Tulane
	Quinn Buckner	12	1973–74	Purdue

== Steals ==
Career
Rank	Player	Steals	Seasons
1	Dane Fife	180	1998–99 1999–00 2000–01 2001–02
2	Steve Alford	178	1983–84 1984–85 1985–86 1986–87
3	Victor Oladipo	161	2010–11 2011–12 2012–13
4	Greg Graham	151	1989–90 1990–91 1991–92 1992–93
5	Alan Henderson	148	1991–92 1992–93 1993–94 1994–95
6	Mike Woodson	142	1976–77 1977–78 1978–79 1979–80
7	Tom Coverdale	137	1999–00 2000–01 2001–02 2002–03
8	Isiah Thomas	136	1979–80 1980–81
9	Chris Reynolds	135	1989–90 1990–91 1991–92 1992–93
10	Damon Bailey	132	1990–91 1991–92 1992–93 1993–94

Season
Rank	Player	Steals	Season
1	Victor Oladipo	78	2012–13
2	Isiah Thomas	74	1980–81
3	Quinn Buckner	65	1975–76
4	Isiah Thomas	62	1979–80
5	Luke Recker	59	1998–99
6	Tom Coverdale	57	2001–02
7	Jared Jeffries	54	2001–02
	Tom Coverdale	54	2000–01
9	Dane Fife	53	2001–02
	Mike Woodson	53	1978–79

Single game
Rank	Player	Steals	Season	Opponent
1	Scott May	9	1975–76	Michigan
2	Michael Lewis	8	1999–00	Ohio State
	Steve Alford	8	1984–85	Butler
4	Race Thompson	7	2020–21	Michigan State
	OG Anunoby	7	2016–17	Rutgers
	William Gladness	7	1998–99	Syracuse
	Jim Crews	7	1975–76	UCLA
8	Victor Oladipo	6	2012–13	Michigan State
	Cody Zeller	6	2011–12	New Mexico State
	Cody Zeller	6	2011–12	Chattanooga
	Earl Calloway	6	2005–06	San Diego State
	Robert Vaden	6	2005–06	Western Illinois

== Blocks ==
Career
Rank	Player	Blocks	Seasons
1	Trayce Jackson-Davis	270	2019–20 2020–21 2021-22 2022-23
2	Jeff Newton	227	1999–00 2000–01 2001–02 2002–03
3	Alan Henderson	213	1991–92 1992–93 1993–94 1994–95
4	D.J. White	198	2004–05 2005–06 2006–07 2007–08
5	Uwe Blab	196	1981–82 1982–83 1983–84 1984–85
6	George Leach	194	2000–01 2001–02 2002–03 2003–04
7	Dean Garrett	192	1986–87 1987–88
8	Ray Tolbert	155	1977–78 1978–79 1979–80 1980–81
9	Juwan Morgan	138	2015–16 2016–17 2017–18 2018–19
10	Eric Anderson	136	1988–89 1989–90 1990–91 1991–92

Season
Rank	Player	Blocks	Season
1	Dean Garrett	99	1987–88
2	Dean Garrett	93	1986–87
3	Trayce Jackson-Davis	92	2022-23
4	Trayce Jackson-Davis	81	2021–22
5	George Leach	79	2002–03
6	D.J. White	73	2006–07
7	Uwe Blab	72	1984–85
8	Jeff Newton	70	2001–02
9	Uwe Blab	69	1983–84
10	D.J. White	64	2004–05
	Alan Henderson	64	1994–95

Single game
Rank	Player	Blocks	Season	Opponent
1	Steve Downing	10	1970–71	Michigan
2	Trayce Jackson-Davis	9	2022–23	Kansas
3	Dean Garrett	8	1987–88	Iowa
	Dean Garrett	8	1986–87	Montana State
5	Trayce Jackson-Davis	7	2021–22	Northern Illinois
	George Leach	7	2003–04	Michigan
	Jeff Newton	7	2001–02	Iowa
	George Leach	7	2001–02	Miami (FL)
	George Leach	7	2001–02	Texas
	Dean Garrett	7	1987–88	Montana State
	Dean Garrett	7	1986–87	UNC-Wilm.
