= Big Ten Conference Men's Basketball Freshman of the Year =

American collegiate basketball award

- Awarded for: the most outstanding men's basketball freshman player in the Big Ten Conference
- Country: United States

History
- First award: 1986
- Most recent: Keaton Wagler, Illinois

The Big Ten Conference Men's Basketball Freshman of the Year is a basketball award given to the Big Ten Conference's most outstanding freshman player. The award was first given following the 1985–86 season.

Indiana has the record for the most winners with twelve.

== Key ==
†	Co-Freshman of the Year
*	Declared for NBA draft after freshman year

== Winners ==
Season	Player	School	Reference
1985–86	Gary Grant	Michigan	
1986–87	Dean Garrett^{[a]}	Indiana	
1987–88	Jay Edwards	Indiana	
1988–89	Eric Anderson	Indiana	
1989–90	Jim Jackson	Ohio State	
1990–91	Damon Bailey	Indiana	
1991–92	Chris Webber^{[b]}	Michigan	
1992–93	Greg Simpson	Ohio State	
1993–94	Jess Settles	Iowa	
1994–95	Maurice Taylor	Michigan	
1995–96	Sam Okey	Wisconsin	
1996–97	A. J. Guyton	Indiana	
1997–98	Michael Redd	Ohio State	
1998–99	Cory Bradford	Illinois	
1999–00^{†}	Brian Cook	Illinois	
1999–00^{†}	LaVell Blanchard	Michigan	
2000–01	Jared Jeffries	Indiana	
2001–02	Rick Rickert	Minnesota	
2002–03	Daniel Horton	Michigan	
2003–04	Kris Humphries*	Minnesota	
2004–05	D. J. White	Indiana	
2005–06	Jamelle Cornley	Penn State	
2006–07	Greg Oden*	Ohio State	
2007–08	Eric Gordon*	Indiana	
2008–09	William Buford	Ohio State	
2009–10	D. J. Richardson	Illinois	
2010–11	Jared Sullinger	Ohio State	
2011–12	Cody Zeller	Indiana	
2012–13	Gary Harris	Michigan State	
2013–14	Noah Vonleh*	Indiana	
2014–15	D'Angelo Russell*	Ohio State	
2015–16	Ethan Happ	Wisconsin	
2016–17	Miles Bridges	Michigan State	
2017–18	Jaren Jackson Jr.*	Michigan State	
2018–19	Ignas Brazdeikis*	Michigan	
2019–20	Kofi Cockburn	Illinois	
2020–21	Hunter Dickinson	Michigan	
2021–22	Malaki Branham*	Ohio State	
2022–23	Jalen Hood-Schifino*	Indiana	
2023–24^{†}	Mackenzie Mgbako	Indiana	
2023–24^{†}	Owen Freeman	Iowa	
2024–25	Derik Queen*	Maryland	
2025–26	Keaton Wagler*	Illinois	

== Winners by school ==
School (year joined)	Winners	Years
Indiana (1900)	12	1987^{[a]}, 1988, 1989, 1991, 1997, 2001, 2005, 2008, 2012, 2014, 2023, 2024^{†}
Ohio State (1912)	8	1990, 1993, 1998, 2007, 2009, 2011, 2015, 2022
Michigan (1896)	7	1986, 1992^{[b]}, 1995, 2000^{†}, 2003, 2019, 2021
Illinois (1896)	5	1999, 2000^{†}, 2010, 2020, 2026
Michigan State (1953)	3	2013, 2017, 2018
Iowa (1900)	2	1994, 2024^{†}
Minnesota (1896)	2	2002, 2004
Wisconsin (1896)	2	1996, 2016
Maryland (2014)	1	2025
Penn State (1993)	1	2006
Nebraska (2011)	0	—
Northwestern (1896)	0	—
Oregon (2024)	0	—
Purdue (1896)	0	—
Rutgers (2014)	0	—
UCLA (2024)	0	—
USC (2024)	0	—
Washington (2024)	0	—

== Footnotes ==
- ^{a} During the 1986-1987 season Garrett was not a freshman but was a junior college transfer.
- ^{b} Webber's selection was later vacated as a result of sanctions due to NCAA violations.
