= Gabe Cupps =

American basketball player (born 2004)

UIC Flames
- Position: Point guard
- League: Missouri Valley Conference

Personal information
- Born: July 6, 2004 (age 22) Dayton, Ohio, U.S.
- Listed height: 6 ft 2 in (1.88 m)
- Listed weight: 180 lb (82 kg)

Career information
- High school: Centerville (Centerville, Ohio)
- College: Indiana (2023–2025); Ohio State (2025–2026); UIC (2026–present)

Career highlights
- 2× Mr. OHSBCA (2022, 2023); Ohio Mr. Basketball (2022)

Gabe Cupps (born July 6, 2004) is an American college basketball player for the UIC Flames of the Missouri Valley Conference. Cupps previously played for the Indiana Hoosiers and the Ohio State Buckeyes of the Big Ten Conference. He was a four-star recruit coming out of high school with multiple scholarship offers from major NCAA Division I programs.

== Early life and high school career ==
Cupps grew up on a farm in St. Paris, Ohio, before moving to Centerville, Ohio, in the third grade. His father Brook has been the head coach of the Centerville High School Elks boys' basketball team since 2013. Before that, he was the head coach and athletic director at Graham High School in St. Paris. As a result, Cupps was introduced to basketball at a young age. He absorbed his dad's work ethic according to his older sister Ally, "I watch how hard Gabe works, and then watch how hard my dad works. My whole life he’s just been basketball, basketball, basketball. And he loves his guys, and he gives them absolutely everything that he has. And then to see Gabe mirror that and to see how grounded he is..." As a child, Cupps worked on his skills at home in the basement. He would pick a spot on the wall and practice passing the ball to that exact spot 50 straight times with each hand, and his dad would reward him with stickers: "I had a giant sticker board in my room, and I put all the stickers I got on it, so I could keep track. It was setting mini-goals for me, and I think that helped develop my passion."

Cupps played alongside Bronny James on the North Coast Blue Chips AAU team in middle school and then the Cincinnati-based AAU team Midwest Basketball Club. He led his high school team to a record of 95–20, with only eight losses coming after his freshman year.

=== Freshman season ===
In 2019, Cupps enrolled at Centerville High School to play under his dad's tutelage. He made his high school debut on December 7, 2019, scoring 10 points in a 46–47 loss to Trinity High School in Louisville, Kentucky. On January 11, 2020, he scored a season-high 22 points in a 52–36 win over Springfield High School. The season ended with an overall record of 15–12, with Cupps playing in 25 of the 27 games. Cupps averaged 11.2 points, 2.1 assists, and 1.8 rebounds per game, shooting 40.3% from the field and 38.1% from three-point range.

=== Sophomore season ===
After losing 66–74 to St. Vincent–St. Mary High School on January 30, 2021, Centerville amassed a 45-game winning streak, which would carry over into the final game of his junior year. Playing in all 29 games of the season, Cupps improved in almost every statistic: 48.9% in field goals, 35.2% in 3-point shots, 81.9% in free throws, 15.2 points, 4.9 assists, and 2.2 rebounds. Going 26–3 that season, the Elks reached the OHSAA D1 state championship game at UD Arena in Dayton on March 21, 2021, against Westerville Central. Cupps led the team with 16 points, making 3 of his 5 3-point attempts. He also had three rebounds and three assists. The final score, 43–42 came down to the wire after a missed 3-point attempt at the buzzer. It was the first boys' basketball title in school history.

=== Junior season ===
In pursuit of back-to-back championships, Cupps and the Elks continued on their 45-game winning streak. Cupps had a career-high game of 30 points in a 85–72 victory over Huntington Prep School on February 13, 2022. He averaged 14.2 points, 6.8 assists, and 2.5 rebounds on 50.3% shooting, 44.3% on threes, and 85.2% on free throws. Cupps became just the fourth Elks player overall to eclipse 1,000 points. After an undefeated season, the Elks once again reached the OHSAA D1 state championship game on March 20, 2022. This time they faced the Pickerington Central Tigers led by Devin Royal. While the score was close throughout the game, the Tigers never relinquished the lead. After winning 45 games, the Elks finally lost, falling 48–55. Cupps led the Elks with 14 points. Despite missing out on repeat titles, Cupps was named the 2022 Ohio Mr. Basketball by the Associated Press and by the OHSBCA, the first Elk to receive that honor. Among the ranks of other Ohio Mr. Basketball winners include NBA players Jimmy Jackson, Luke Kennard, and LeBron James to which Cupps commented "It is super cool. I never thought about winning Mr. Basketball, and these guys are at a super high level." He went on to say, "I think of how I was raised as a farm kid in St. Paris and looking [at] these guys [who] have pretty good gifts they were blessed with. I hope I am setting an example for how hard work can get you anywhere you want to go, and I hope it is something the younger kids see."

=== Senior season ===
As a senior, Cupps averaged 15.4 points, 6.2 assists, 4.5 rebounds and 2.2 steals per game and led Centerville to an overall record of 25–4. The Elks reached the state semifinals, but lost once again to Pickerington Central High School, 57–53. In Cupps' final game as an Elk, he scored 22 points, dished seven assists, grabbed two rebounds, and garnered four steals. While Devin Royal was honored 2023 Ohio Mr. Basketball by the AP at the end of the season, Cupps was named Co-Mr. Basketball by the OHSBCA (with Royal).

Before college, Cupps played in The Throne National Championship, a four-day single elimination tournament between 16 teams featuring the nation's best high school talent. Cupps formed a team with some of his high school teammates, and they called themselves The 'Ville. The 'Ville was given the #13 seed, and on March 29, 2023, they played their First Round game against the #4 seed Beaumont Elite (Texas) at Morehouse College in Atlanta. They won 69–57 which set up their next game in Round 2 against Second II None (Illinois). On March 30, The 'Ville's run to the championship game ended with a 51–52 loss.

=== Recruiting ===
While Cupps was the star of his high school teams, there wasn't much recruiting interest until his junior year (2021–22). He received his first scholarship offer in June 2021; however, after a great summer on the Adidas AAU circuit, his scholarship offers expanded to include major programs like Indiana, Stanford, Michigan, Ohio State, Virginia Tech, Kansas State, Clemson, Dayton, and Cincinnati. On October 31, 2021, Cupps announced his top three schools on Twitter: Indiana, Ohio State, and Stanford. On November 16, 2021, Cupps announced his commitment to the Indiana Hoosiers. Assistant Head Coach Brian Walsh was his lead recruiter, and after encouraging coach Mike Woodson and fellow assistant head coach Yasir Rosemond to watch Cupps play at Centerville, they were sold. Walsh said "Right from the jump, there was no convincing. They saw him one time, and they called me about four different times during the game and two thumbs up. They fell in love with him the first time they saw him play just with his IQ. He knows how to play. He's obviously not the most athletic or going to dunk on you, but when it comes down to it, he's going to make every winning play. He's going to run the team, he's going to talk, he's going to lead, he's going to take charges. He has all the intangibles that, as a coach, you're going to want in a player to help you win basketball games, and I think coach and the staff saw that right away and the belief just grew more right after that." Cupps had the following to say about his commitment to Indiana, "I was kind of leaning towards Indiana for a while. Every time I kind of went back (to campus), it kind of made the feeling a little bit stronger that it was the place for me. After that game on Friday (against Northern Illinois), I was dead set that I was meant to be there. I think the thing that stood out was just the interaction between the coaches and the players and all of the stuff behind the scenes that goes into making them a successful team right now. Really, it was just confirmation of seeing that in a real game. I had seen some practice and seen how coach (Mike) Woodson had handled it in practice, but just kind of wanted that confirmation of the real thing."

College recruiting
Name	Hometown	School	Height	Weight	Commit date
Gabe Cupps; G/PG	Dayton, Ohio	Centerville High School (Ohio)	6 ft 2 in (1.88 m)	175 lb (79 kg)	Nov 16, 2021
Gabe Cupps; G/PG	Recruit ratings: Scout: Rivals: 247Sports: ESPN: (84)				
Overall recruit ranking: Rivals: 122 247Sports: 107 ESPN: 81
Note: In many cases, Scout, Rivals, 247Sports, On3, and ESPN may conflict in their listings of height and weight.; In these cases, the average was taken. ESPN grades are on a 100-point scale.; Sources: "Indiana 2023 Basketball Commitments". Rivals.; "2023 Team Ranking". Rivals.

== Player profile ==
Cupps stands at 6 feet and 2 inches tall (1.88 m) and primarily plays the point guard position and secondarily the shooting guard position. Cupps is known for his high basketball IQ, play-making abilities, ability to the run the offense, and high energy on defense creating opportunities for steals and rebounds. Brook Cupps, Cupps' father and high school coach, stated that while Cupps' stats and style of play might not jump out at you, the more you watch him play, the more you begin to realize all the things he does to help his team win. To quote Brook, "Your job as a point guard is to make your team win. So I think people look at him like that. He does that. He wins a lot. So looking at all the different things that he does to impact the game like pulling a huddle together, reminding a guy of a play, all those things, celebrating a teammate's shot. Those are really huge things, and some people don't recognize that or don't value that." Xavier men's head basketball coach Sean Miller, while recruiting a teammate of Cupps at Centerville High School, noticed Cupps' game reminded him of T.J. McConnell, whom he had coached while at Arizona. In a 2019 Instagram post, LeBron James called Cupps the best shooter in the class of 2023. When Cupps was 14, he enticed James into a 3-point shooting contest. James explained after his victory, "Told him about a certain switch I can hit when needed, and he didn’t believe me. Well he found out the hard way!" James and Cupps go all the back to the days of North Coast Blue Chips, where Cupps played with James' son Bronny James.

Perhaps one of Cupps' greatest strengths is his work ethic and team spirit embodied through The Breakfast Club and "The Chop." The Breakfast Club begins every morning at 6:00am, and through thick or thin, Cupps gets up at 5:25am and has been there every morning since his middle school days and has continued the routine over into college. He states, "I am not thinking about the hours of sleep I am missing. I am thinking about of it as an opportunity to work and get better." The morning workouts are voluntary and led by team leaders, like Cupps. The workouts are designed to get in more reps and personal development for the betterment of the team. "The Chop" is an annual tradition at Centerville High School, where the boys' basketball team would retreat for a weekend and chop down dead trees, among other team bonding activities. "You’re not going to see an impact after the first 10 swings," said Cupps. "You just gotta keep chopping, keep going. It’s going to be adversity. There’s going to be times where you don’t think you’re getting anywhere. But you just gotta keep pushing through it and eventually the tree is going to fall."

== Career statistics ==
Legend
GP	Games played	GS	Games started	MPG	Minutes per game
FG%	Field goal percentage	3P%	3-point field goal percentage	FT%	Free throw percentage
RPG	Rebounds per game	APG	Assists per game	SPG	Steals per game
BPG	Blocks per game	PPG	Points per game	**Bold**	Career high

=== College ===
Year	Team	GP	GS	MPG	FG%	3P%	FT%	RPG	APG	SPG	BPG	PPG
2023–24	Indiana	**33**	**22**	**21.7**	.364	**.359**	.615	**1.8**	**1.2**	**.7**	0	**2.6**
2024–25	Indiana	4	0	6.0	.000	.000	.000	0.2	0.8	0.0	0	0.0
2025–26	Ohio State	33	0	12.2	**.378**	.259	**.737**	1.1	1.1	0.4	0	1.7
Career		70	22	16.3	.358	.304	.688	1.4	1.1	.5	0	2.0

== Personal life ==
Cupps is the son of Brook and Betsy Cupps, and he has one older sister, Ally Cupps.

Ahead of his freshman year at Indiana, Cupps joined the Hoosier Hysterics NIL Collective, which pools money from businesses, donors and fans and works to create NIL deals for IU athletes. On October 19, 2023, in The Breakfast Club fashion, Cupps released The Breakfast Club clothing line through the Indiana NIL Store. The line includes T-shirts, sweaters, and hoodies. To promote the release, Cupps had a photo shoot at a Waffle House.
