= Khristian Lander =

American basketball player (born 2002)

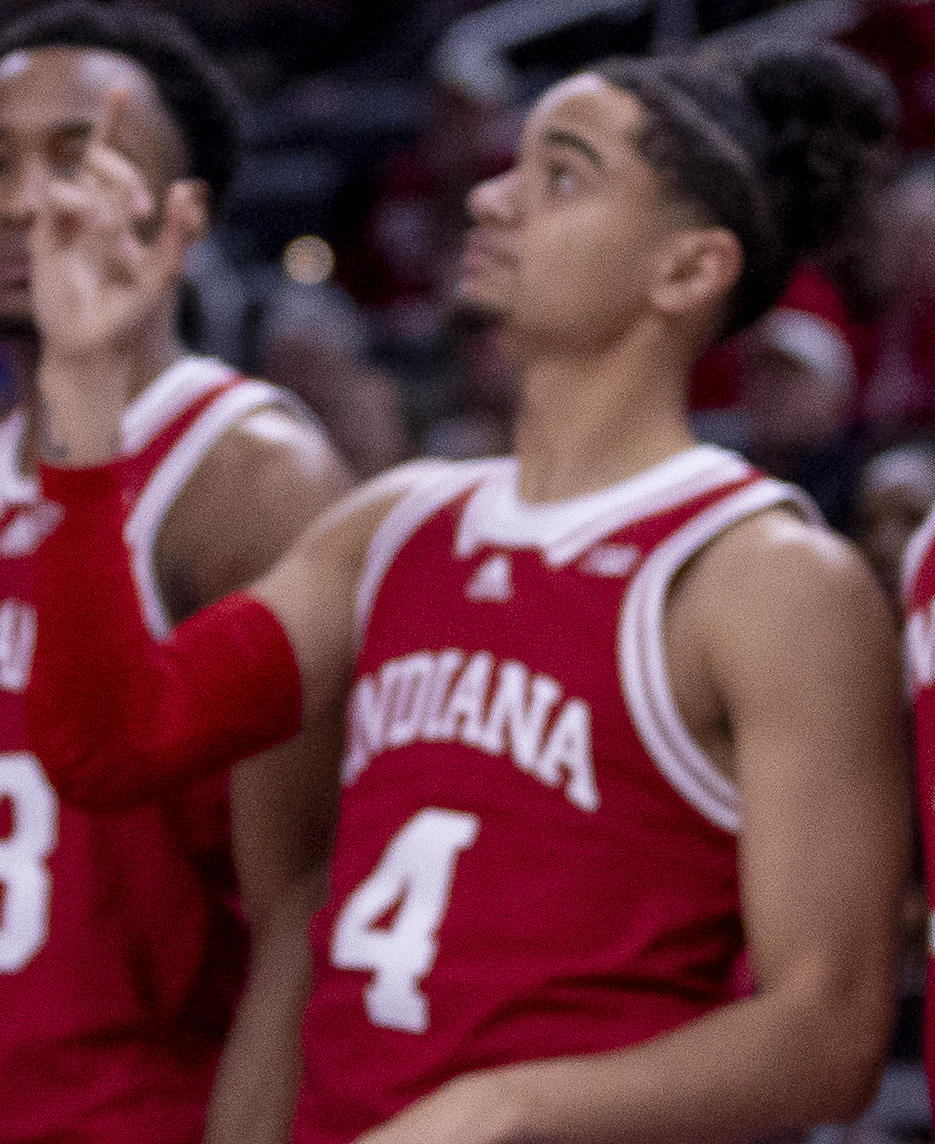
- Lander in 2022

No. 4 – Western Kentucky Hilltoppers
- Position: Point guard
- League: Conference USA

Personal information
- Born: August 9, 2002 (age 24)
- Listed height: 6 ft 2 in (1.88 m)
- Listed weight: 185 lb (84 kg)

Career information
- High school: FJ Reitz (Evansville, Indiana)
- College: Indiana (2020–2022); Western Kentucky (2022–2025)

Khristian Lander (born August 9, 2002) is an American college basketball player for the Western Kentucky Hilltoppers of the Conference USA. He previously played for the Indiana Hoosiers of the Big Ten Conference.

== High school career ==
Lander played basketball for FJ Reitz High School in Evansville, Indiana. As a junior, he averaged 21 points, six rebounds and 4.6 assists per game, earning MaxPreps Junior All-American third team honors. Lander finished his high school career with 1,314 points. He also played on the AAU circuit with Indiana Elite, where he built a relationship with future college teammates Trey Galloway and Anthony Leal.

Lander was a consensus five-star recruit, according to major recruiting services. On February 25, 2020, he announced his commitment to Indiana over offers from Louisville, Memphis and Michigan, among others. On May 18, it was announced that Lander, originally a member of the 2021 class, would reclassify to the 2020 class. He made the decision in part because he wanted to play with Trayce Jackson-Davis.

College recruiting
Name	Hometown	School	Height	Weight	Commit date
Khristian Lander; PG	Evansville, IN	FJ Reitz (IN)	6 ft 2 in (1.88 m)	165 lb (75 kg)	Feb 25, 2020
Khristian Lander; PG	Recruit ratings: Rivals: 247Sports: ESPN: (90)				
Overall recruit ranking: Rivals: 26 247Sports: 26 ESPN: 27
Note: In many cases, Scout, Rivals, 247Sports, On3, and ESPN may conflict in their listings of height and weight.; In these cases, the average was taken. ESPN grades are on a 100-point scale.; Sources: "Indiana 2020 Basketball Commitments". Rivals.; "2020 Indiana Hoosiers Recruiting Class". ESPN.; "2020 Team Ranking". Rivals.

== College career ==
As a freshman, Lander averaged 2.1 points and 1.2 assists per game. After the season, he initially entered the transfer portal due to the firing of coach Archie Miller, but opted to remain at Indiana when the school hired Mike Woodson. On February 8, 2022, Lander was one of five players suspended by Woodson for breaking team rules. Lander was reinstated on February 10, after missing one game.

In April 2022, Lander transferred to Western Kentucky. He averaged 3.2 points per game as a junior.

== Career statistics ==
Legend
GP	Games played	GS	Games started	MPG	Minutes per game
FG%	Field goal percentage	3P%	3-point field goal percentage	FT%	Free throw percentage
RPG	Rebounds per game	APG	Assists per game	SPG	Steals per game
BPG	Blocks per game	PPG	Points per game	**Bold**	Career high

=== College ===
Year	Team	GP	GS	MPG	FG%	3P%	FT%	RPG	APG	SPG	BPG	PPG
2020–21	Indiana	26	0	10.1	.257	.273	**.875**	.8	1.2	.3	**.2**	2.1
2021–22	Indiana	13	0	8.8	**.452**	**.526**	.750	.8	0.9	.3	.1	2.9
2022–23	Western Kentucky	**33**	2	11.4	.307	.204	.579	.8	0.6	.2	.1	3.2
2022–23	Western Kentucky	26	**11**	**23.1**	.406	.461	.750	**2.1**	**2.0**	**1.0**	.1	**9.0**
Career		98	13	13.8	.357	.372	.723	1.4	1.2	.4	.1	4.4

== Personal life ==
Lander is the son of Keith and Brandie Lander. He and his father have matching tattoos of their initials, depicting a prince's crown and a king's crown respectively.
