= Anthony Leal =

American basketball player

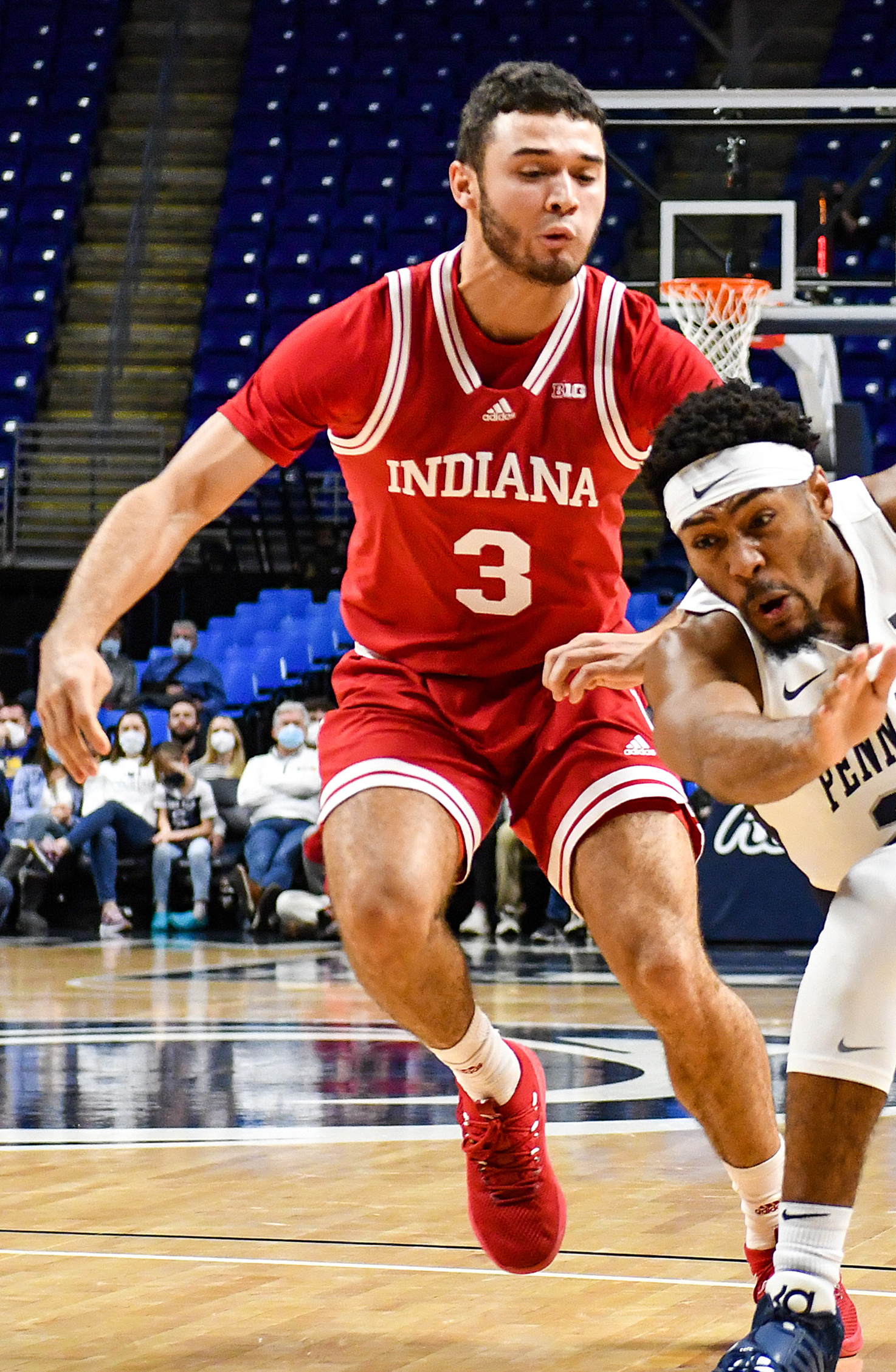

Personal information
- Born: May 12, 2001 (age 25) Bloomington, Indiana, U.S.
- Listed height: 6 ft 5 in (1.96 m)
- Listed weight: 205 lb (93 kg)

Career information
- High school: Bloomington South (Bloomington, Indiana)
- College: Indiana (2020–2025)
- NBA draft: 2025: undrafted
- Position: Shooting guard
- Number: 3

Career highlights
- Indiana Mr. Basketball (2020)

Anthony Leal (born May 12, 2001) is an American college basketball player for the Indiana Hoosiers of the Big Ten Conference. He previously played for Bloomington South and was ranked as the third best player in the state of Indiana for the class of 2020.

== High school career ==
Leal attended Bloomington High School South, where he finished his senior season averaging 18.5 points and as the all-time leading scorer in the school's history. He helped the Panthers to an undefeated regular season and a No. 1 ranking in the state of Indiana. His team was poised to make a run as the favorite for the state title in Class 4A; however, due to the COVID-19 pandemic, the postseason tournament was canceled. Despite not winning the state championship, Leal still captured the honor of 2020 Indiana Mr. Basketball. During the off-seasons, Leal played in the AAU circuit on team Indiana Elite. There he was able to build a relationship with future IU teammates, Trey Galloway and Khristian Lander.

=== Recruiting ===
Leal was recruited in high school by numerous schools, including scholarship offers from in-state schools Indiana, Butler, and out-of-state, Big Ten schools Iowa, Maryland, and Northwestern alongside Stanford. Leal announced a top two of Indiana and Stanford on July 25, 2019. On August 9, 2019, Leal announced his commitment to Indiana.

College recruiting
Name	Hometown	School	Height	Weight	Commit date
Anthony Leal; SG	Bloomington, IN	Bloomington South (IN)	6 ft 5 in (1.96 m)	195 lb (88 kg)	Aug 9, 2019
Anthony Leal; SG	Recruit ratings: Rivals: 247Sports: ESPN: (79)				
Overall recruit ranking: Rivals: 127 247Sports: 144 ESPN: —
Note: In many cases, Scout, Rivals, 247Sports, On3, and ESPN may conflict in their listings of height and weight.; In these cases, the average was taken. ESPN grades are on a 100-point scale.; Sources: "Indiana 2020 Basketball Commitments". Rivals.; "2020 Indiana Hoosiers Recruiting Class". ESPN.; "2020 Team Ranking". Rivals.

== College career ==
In his first year with the Hoosiers, the 2020–21 season, Leal took a minor role in Indiana's rotation. With stand-outs Al Durham Jr. and Armaan Franklin ahead of him in the rotation, Leal played 15 or more minutes in just six games. Over 20 games, he shot just 30 percent from distance on 30 attempts. But Leal also showed his long-term potential. In a double-overtime loss at Wisconsin in January, Leal scored nine points and helped push the game to double overtime. Leal also scored six points, with four rebounds and three steals in 15 minutes in a 67–65 upset win over Iowa in February.

In his second year with the Hoosiers, the 2021–22 season, Leal stated, "I want everybody to know that I'm here for the school and for the program and for this jersey. No matter who the coaches are or who my teammates are, I'm here and I'm here to win. That's the ultimate goal." He saw about the same number of minutes as he did his first season. In games against Nebraska, Wisconsin, Merrimack, Notre Dame, and Northern Kentucky, Leal logged 15.2 minutes per game, but he took only 10 shots over those five games, making three of his attempts. Despite declining playing time that year, Leal tweeted after the season ended, "Look up, not out. Beyond blessed that God allows me to wear INDIANA across my chest. Back to work for next season."

== Career statistics ==
Legend
GP	Games played	GS	Games started	MPG	Minutes per game
FG%	Field goal percentage	3P%	3-point field goal percentage	FT%	Free throw percentage
RPG	Rebounds per game	APG	Assists per game	SPG	Steals per game
BPG	Blocks per game	PPG	Points per game	**Bold**	Career high

=== College ===
Year	Team	GP	GS	MPG	FG%	3P%	FT%	RPG	APG	SPG	BPG	PPG
2020–21	Indiana	20	0	11.6	.313	.300	.600	**1.4**	1.0	.5	.1	1.6
2021–22	Indiana	17	**2**	10.2	.407	**.318**	.667	0.9	1.1	.4	.1	1.9
2022–23	Indiana	11	0	2.2	.000	.000	**1.000**	0.2	1.1	.1	.1	0.2
2023–24	Indiana	**21**	0	**14.7**	**.444**	.318	.474	0.9	**2.1**	**1.1**	**.2**	**2.4**
Career		69	2	10.7	.389	.352	.655	2.1	1.0	.9	.3	1.7

== Personal life ==
Leal is the son of Martin and Sherry Leal, both of whom work for the IU Foundation. Leal also has an older sister, Lauren, who played basketball for DePauw University. With IU such a dominant force in his upbringing, that played a major factor in his decision to be the next Hoosier player from Bloomington. Leal said Jordan Hulls was the player he looked up to most as a young teen going to games at Simon Skjodt Assembly Hall, stating, "Those teams were really special to watch, and it was awesome to see how they brought Hoosier Nation together. I hope that, hopefully, the team I’m on at IU can do the same." The two natives now share a bond, where Hulls is now serving as a mentor to Leal. Leal states that Hulls has offered advice, including how to deal with the pressures of being a hometown star going to IU.
