= Mackenzie Mgbako =

Nigerian-American basketball player

No. 21 – Texas A&M Aggies
- Position: Small forward
- League: Southeastern Conference

Personal information
- Born: November 18, 2004 (age 22)
- Listed height: 6 ft 8 in (2.03 m)
- Listed weight: 217 lb (98 kg)

Career information
- High school: Gill St. Bernard's School (Gladstone, New Jersey); Roselle Catholic (Roselle, New Jersey)
- College: Indiana (2023–2025); Texas A&M (2025–present)

Career highlights
- Big Ten Freshman of the Year (2024); Big Ten All-Freshman Team (2024); McDonald's All-American (2023); Jordan Brand Classic (2023); Nike Hoop Summit (2023)

Mackenzie Mgbako (born November 18, 2004) is a Nigerian-American college basketball player for the Texas A&M Aggies of the Southeastern Conference. He previously played for the Indiana Hoosiers of the Big Ten Conference.

== Early life and high school career ==
Mgbako grew up in the Gladstone section of Peapack-Gladstone, New Jersey and initially attended Gill St. Bernard's School. He averaged 19.5 points, 10.6 rebounds, and 2.9 assists as a junior. Mgbako transferred to Roselle Catholic High School before his senior season. Mgbako was selected to play in the 2023 McDonald's All-American Boys Game during his senior year. He averaged 16.3 points, 9.2 rebounds, and 2.2 assists over 16 games during the season and missed one month due to an ankle injury.

=== Recruiting ===
Mgbako was a consensus five-star recruit and one of the top players in the 2023 class, according to major recruiting services. He initially committed to playing college basketball for Duke during his junior year after considering offers from Kentucky, Ohio State, and Memphis. Mgbako decommitted from Duke late into his senior season. After being granted a release from his National Letter of Intent from Duke, he committed to playing college basketball for Indiana after also considering Kansas.

College recruiting
Name	Hometown	School	Height	Weight	Commit date
Mackenzie Mgbako; SF / PF	Gladstone, NJ	Roselle Catholic (NJ)	6 ft 8 in (2.03 m)	210 lb (95 kg)	May 12, 2023
Mackenzie Mgbako; SF / PF	Recruit ratings: Rivals: 247Sports: ESPN: (92)				
Overall recruit ranking: Rivals: 9 247Sports: 10 ESPN: 9
Note: In many cases, Scout, Rivals, 247Sports, On3, and ESPN may conflict in their listings of height and weight.; In these cases, the average was taken. ESPN grades are on a 100-point scale.; Sources: "Indiana 2023 Basketball Commitments". Rivals.; "2023 Indiana Hoosiers Recruiting Class". ESPN.; "2023 Team Ranking". Rivals.

== College career ==
Mgbako averaged 12.2 points, 4.0 rebounds and 1.3 assists per game as a freshman. He earned Big Ten co-Freshman of the Year honors alongside Iowa's Owen Freeman. As a sophomore, Mgbako averaged 12.2 points, 4.6 rebounds and 1.1 assists per game. Following the season he entered the 2025 NBA draft and the transfer portal.

Mgbagbo ultimately withdrew from the draft and transferred to Texas A&M. He started seven games and averaged 10.4 points, 4.9 rebounds, and 1.3 assists before undergoing a season-ending foot fracture.

== Career statistics ==
Legend
GP	Games played	GS	Games started	MPG	Minutes per game
FG%	Field goal percentage	3P%	3-point field goal percentage	FT%	Free throw percentage
RPG	Rebounds per game	APG	Assists per game	SPG	Steals per game
BPG	Blocks per game	PPG	Points per game	**Bold**	Career high

=== College ===
Year	Team	GP	GS	MPG	FG%	3P%	FT%	RPG	APG	SPG	BPG	PPG
2023–24	Indiana	**33**	**33**	**27.0**	.395	.327	.821	4.1	**1.3**	.4	.4	**12.2**
2024–25	Indiana	32	31	25.0	**.437**	.329	.810	4.6	1.1	.3	**.5**	**12.2**
2025–26	Texas A&M	7	7	18.9	.390	**.343**	**.882**	**4.9**	**1.3**	**.6**	.1	10.4
Career		72	71	23.6	.407	.333	.837	4.5	1.2	.4	.3	11.6
