= Malik Reneau =

American basketball player (born 2003)

No. 5 – Miami Hurricanes
- Position: Power forward
- League: Atlantic Coast Conference

Personal information
- Born: April 1, 2003 (age 23) Miami, Florida, U.S.
- Listed height: 6 ft 9 in (2.06 m)
- Listed weight: 238 lb (108 kg)

Career information
- High school: Montverde Academy (Montverde, Florida)
- College: Indiana (2022–2025); Miami (Florida) (2025–present)

Career highlights
- First-team All-ACC (2026); 2× GEICO High School National champion (2021, 2022)

Malik Reneau (born April 1, 2003) is an American college basketball player for the Miami Hurricanes of the Atlantic Coast Conference (ACC). He previously played for the Indiana Hoosiers. Reneau played high school basketball for Montverde Academy, where he helped lead his team to back-to-back High School Showcase national titles (2021 and 2022).

== High school career ==
Reneau played for national powerhouse Montverde Academy in Florida, coached by Kevin Boyle. At Montverde, with fellow Hoosier commit Jalen Hood-Schifino, Reneau won back-to-back GEICO High School Basketball National titles (2021 and 2022). He averaged 11.9 points and 6.6 rebounds as a senior, with 14.3 points and 8.3 rebounds at the GEICO High School Nationals, including a double-double with 14 points and 12 rebounds in the championship game.

Reneau was named an all-star and invited to play in the Jordan Brand Classic, where he scored 10 points and garnered nine rebounds. In the off-season prior to college he also played for the Nightrydas Elite grassroots program on the Nike EYBL circuit, averaging 17.2 points, 8.5 rebounds, and 2.4 assists in 12 games.

=== Recruiting ===
Reneau originally decided to go with the Florida Gators, but he changed his mind when head coach Mike White took a job opportunity with the Georgia Bulldogs. Hoosiers point guard and fellow Montverde teammate Jalen Hood-Schifino prompted Indiana coaches to begin recruiting Reneau. Hood-Schifino recalled, "I was with him when he de-committed. As soon as that happened, I texted my coaches. I was like, we have to get Malik. As soon as I said that, the coaches got on him and they did a great job of recruiting him."

College recruiting
Name	Hometown	School	Height	Weight	Commit date
Malik Reneau; F	Miami, Florida	Montverde Academy (Montverde, FL)	6 ft 9 in (2.06 m)	233 lb (106 kg)	Apr 18, 2022
Malik Reneau; F	Recruit ratings: Scout: Rivals: 247Sports: ESPN: (90)				
Overall recruit ranking: Rivals: 25 247Sports: 27 ESPN: 22
Note: In many cases, Scout, Rivals, 247Sports, On3, and ESPN may conflict in their listings of height and weight.; In these cases, the average was taken. ESPN grades are on a 100-point scale.; Sources: "Indiana 2022 Basketball Commitments". Rivals.; "2022 Indiana Hoosiers Recruiting Class". ESPN.; "2022 Team Ranking". Rivals.

== College career ==
=== Indiana ===
In his freshman year during the 2022-23 season, Reneau served as a backup to Trayce Jackson-Davis and Race Thompson, playing in 35 games and averaging 6.1 points, 3.7 rebounds, 0.8 assists, and 55.3 FG% in 14.9 minutes per game. He is left-handed like his teammate Trayce Jackson-Davis. Reneau was one of three Hoosiers to appear in all 35 games that season and made three starts. His play drew praise for effectiveness in the post and "stellar" footwork. After the 2024–25 season, Reneau entered his name into the NCAA transfer portal.

=== Miami (FL) ===
Reneau transferred to play for the Miami Hurricanes.

== Career statistics ==
Legend
GP	Games played	GS	Games started	MPG	Minutes per game
FG%	Field goal percentage	3P%	3-point field goal percentage	FT%	Free throw percentage
RPG	Rebounds per game	APG	Assists per game	SPG	Steals per game
BPG	Blocks per game	PPG	Points per game	**Bold**	Career high

=== College ===
Year	Team	GP	GS	MPG	FG%	3P%	FT%	RPG	APG	SPG	BPG	PPG
2022–23	Indiana	**35**	3	14.9	.553	.250	.714	3.7	0.8	0.5	.3	6.1
2023–24	Indiana	33	**33**	**28.7**	**.558**	**.333**	.683	**6.0**	**2.7**	0.5	**.6**	**15.4**
2024–25	Indiana	26	19	23.2	.552	.125	**.733**	5.5	2.0	**0.8**	.5	13.3
Career		94	55	22.0	.555	.260	.705	5.0	1.8	0.6	.4	11.4

== Personal life ==
Reneau was born to Patrick and Melanie Reneau. His mother, who played college basketball, often joined his father in challenging him in one-on-one games.

As part of a student athlete compensation package to raise awareness for Indiana charity partners, Reneau endorsed Big Brothers Big Sisters of Central Indiana, offering in-person appearances (such as speaking, presentation of skills, autograph sessions, and the like) as well as social media posts promoting these appearances and the charity.
