= 2023–24 Indiana Hoosiers men's basketball team =

American college basketball season

2023–24 Indiana Hoosiers men's basketball
- Conference: Big Ten Conference
- Record: 19–14 (10–10 Big Ten)
- Head coach: Mike Woodson (3rd season)
- Associate head coach: Kenya Hunter (4th season); Yasir Rosemond (3rd season)
- Assistant coach: Brian Walsh (2nd season)
- Captains: Trey Galloway; Xavier Johnson
- Home arena: Simon Skjodt Assembly Hall

2023–24 Big Ten Conference men's basketball standings
	Conf.				Overall
Team	W		L	PCT	W		L	PCT
No. 2 Purdue	17	–	3	.850	34	–	5	.872
No. 6 Illinois †	14	–	6	.700	29	–	9	.763
Nebraska	12	–	8	.600	23	–	11	.676
Northwestern	12	–	8	.600	22	–	12	.647
Wisconsin	11	–	9	.550	22	–	14	.611
Indiana	10	–	10	.500	19	–	14	.576
Iowa	10	–	10	.500	19	–	15	.559
Michigan State	10	–	10	.500	20	–	15	.571
Minnesota	9	–	11	.450	19	–	15	.559
Ohio State	9	–	11	.450	22	–	14	.611
Penn State	9	–	11	.450	16	–	17	.485
Maryland	7	–	13	.350	16	–	17	.485
Rutgers	7	–	13	.350	15	–	17	.469
Michigan	3	–	17	.150	8	–	24	.250
† 2024 Big Ten tournament winner Rankings from AP poll

The 2023–24 Indiana Hoosiers men's basketball team represented Indiana University in the 2023–24 NCAA Division I men's basketball season. They were led by third-year head coach, and former Indiana standout, Mike Woodson. The team played its home games at Simon Skjodt Assembly Hall in Bloomington, Indiana, as a member of the Big Ten Conference. The season officially began with the annual event, Hoosier Hysteria (featuring Gucci Mane), on Friday, October 20, 2023.

On November 1, 2023, legendary Hall of Famer IU men's basketball coach Bob Knight died at the age of 83. During his 29 seasons at IU, from 1971 to 2000, Knight led his teams to three national championships and 11 Big Ten titles. In remembrance of his excellence and many contributions to the program, the sport, and the university, the men's team donned "RMK" patches with three stars arced above on their home and away jerseys for every game this season. They debuted during an exhibition game against Marian on November 3, 2023.

Following the conclusion of the season, the team was invited to compete in the 2024 National Invitation Tournament but declined the invitation.

The Indiana Hoosiers men's basketball team drew an average home attendance of 16,468 in 18 games in 2023–24.

== Previous season ==
The Hoosiers finished the regular season ranked No. 19 in the Associated Press poll. The team spent 16 weeks among the top-25 teams in the nation. The Hoosiers also captured a share of 2nd place in the Big Ten Conference with a 21–10 overall regular season record, 12–8 in Big Ten play, and the No. 3 seed in the Big Ten Conference tournament. IU advanced to the semifinals before losing a close game to Penn State. For the second year in a row, the team found themselves in the NCAA Tournament, this time as a No. 4 seed, where they improved upon their performance from the previous year by making it to the Round of 32, but falling to the No. 5 seed Miami (FL), 85–69.

== Offseason ==
=== Coaching changes ===
On May 23, 2023, it was announced that Hoosier legend, Calbert Cheaney, would return to the men's basketball staff as the new director of player development. Over the previous three years, Cheaney had filled the role as an assistant coach with the Indiana Pacers. This was his second stint with IU. He had been director of operations in 2011–12, and then also oversaw the players' internal and external player development for the 2012–13 season.

=== Departures ===
Indiana departures
Name	Number	Pos.	Height	Weight	Year	Hometown	Reason for departure
Jalen Hood-Schifino	1	G	6'6"	213	FR	Pittsburgh, PA	Drafted #17 in 1st round by Los Angeles Lakers in 2023 NBA draft
Michael Shipp	4	G	6'3"	195	SR	Cincinnati, OH	Graduated
Miller Kopp	12	F	6'7"	215	SR	Houston, TX	Graduated
Nathan Childress	14	F	6'6"	212	SR	Zionsville, IN	Graduated/transferred to Indiana Wesleyan
Jordan Geronimo	22	F	6'6"	225	JR	Newark, NJ	Transferred to Maryland
Trayce Jackson-Davis	23	F	6'9"	245	SR	Greenwood, IN	Graduated/drafted #57 in 2nd round by Golden State Warriors in 2023 NBA draft
Race Thompson	25	F	6'8"	235	SR	Plymouth, MN	Graduated
Logan Duncomb	51	C	6'10"	241	SO	Cincinnati, OH	Transferred to Xavier
Tamar Bates	53	G	6'5"	198	SO	Kansas City, KS	Transferred to Missouri

=== Incoming transfers ===
On March 29, 2023, Indiana landed its first transfer from the transfer portal when former Ball State center Payton Sparks committed to the Hoosiers. He arrived at IU with two years of eligibility remaining. He appeared in 62 games at Ball State and averaged 13.4 points, 8.6 rebounds, 1.7 assists, and .7 blocks. The Hoosiers added 7'0 center Kel'el Ware from Oregon on April 10, 2023. As a freshman at Oregon, Ware averaged 6.6 points, 4.1 rebounds and 1.3 blocks in 15.8 minutes in the previous season. Coming out of high school, he was a 5-star recruit, McDonald's All-American, and Jordan Brand All-Star. A third addition from the transfer portal came on April 29, 2023, when Anthony Walker from the 2023 Final Four Miami (FL) Hurricanes committed to Indiana. He averaged 2.8 points and 1.2 rebounds in the previous season.

Indiana incoming transfers
Name	Number	Pos	Height	Weight	Year	Hometown	Previous school	Years remaining	Date eligible
Payton Sparks	24	F	6'9"	240	Junior	Winchester, IN	Ball State	2	October 1, 2023
Kel'el Ware	1	C	7'0"	210	Sophomore	North Little Rock, AR	Oregon	3	October 1, 2023
Anthony Walker	4	F	6'9"	215	RS senior	Baltimore, MD	Miami (FL)	1	October 1, 2023

=== Recruiting classes ===
==== 2023 recruiting class ====
College recruiting
Name	Hometown	School	Height	Weight	Commit date
Jakai Newton; CG	Covington, GA	Newton High School	6 ft 3 in (1.91 m)	190 lb (86 kg)	Oct 22, 2021
Jakai Newton; CG	Recruit ratings: Rivals: 247Sports: ESPN: (N/A)				
Gabe Cupps; PG	Dayton, OH	Centerville High School	6 ft 2 in (1.88 m)	165 lb (75 kg)	Nov 16, 2021
Gabe Cupps; PG	Recruit ratings: Rivals: 247Sports: ESPN: (84)				
Mackenzie Mgbako; PF	Gladstone, NJ	Roselle Catholic	6 ft 8 in (2.03 m)	210 lb (95 kg)	May 12, 2023
Mackenzie Mgbako; PF	Recruit ratings: Rivals: 247Sports: ESPN: (92)				
Overall recruit ranking:
Note: In many cases, Scout, Rivals, 247Sports, On3, and ESPN may conflict in their listings of height and weight.; In these cases, the average was taken. ESPN grades are on a 100-point scale.; Sources: "2023 Team Ranking". Rivals.

== Roster ==
Note: Players' year is based on remaining eligibility. The NCAA did not count the 2020–21 season towards eligibility.

2023–24 Indiana Hoosiers men's basketball team
Players
Coaches

Pos.	#	Name	Height	Weight	Year	Previous school	Hometown
G	0	Xavier Johnson (C)	6 ft 3 in (1.91 m)	200 lb (91 kg)	Sr	Bishop O'Connell/Pitt	Woodbridge, VA
C	1	Kel'el Ware	7 ft 0 in (2.13 m)	230 lb (104 kg)	So	North Little Rock/Oregon	North Little Rock, AR
G	2	Gabe Cupps	6 ft 2 in (1.88 m)	175 lb (79 kg)	Fr	Centerville	Dayton, OH
G/F	3	Anthony Leal	6 ft 5 in (1.96 m)	200 lb (91 kg)	Jr	Bloomington South	Bloomington, IN
F	4	Anthony Walker	6 ft 9 in (2.06 m)	215 lb (98 kg)	Sr	Brewster Academy/Miami (FL)	Baltimore, MD
F	5	Malik Reneau	6 ft 9 in (2.06 m)	233 lb (106 kg)	So	Montverde Academy	Miami, FL
F	10	Kaleb Banks	6 ft 7 in (2.01 m)	215 lb (98 kg)	So	Fayette County	Hampton, GA
G	11	CJ Gunn	6 ft 6 in (1.98 m)	194 lb (88 kg)	So	Lawrence North	Indianapolis, IN
G	12	Jakai Newton (redshirt)	6 ft 3 in (1.91 m)	190 lb (86 kg)	Fr	Newton	Covington, GA
G	13	Shaan Burke (W)	6 ft 5 in (1.96 m)	195 lb (88 kg)	Jr	Vista	San Diego, CA
G	14	Jordan Rayford (W)	6 ft 5 in (1.96 m)	200 lb (91 kg)	RS Fr	Phillips Academy/Air Force	Washington, D.C.
F	15	James Goodis (W)	6 ft 1 in (1.85 m)	170 lb (77 kg)	Fr	Montverde Academy	Winter Park, FL
F	21	Mackenzie Mgbako	6 ft 8 in (2.03 m)	215 lb (98 kg)	Fr	Roselle Catholic	Gladstone, NJ
G	22	Jackson Creel (W)	6 ft 4 in (1.93 m)	190 lb (86 kg)	Sr	Mount Vernon Twsp/Rend Lake	Mt. Vernon, IL
C	24	Payton Sparks	6 ft 9 in (2.06 m)	255 lb (116 kg)	Jr	Winchester/Ball State	Winchester, IN
F	30	Ian Stephens (W)	6 ft 5 in (1.96 m)	165 lb (75 kg)	Fr	New Palestine	New Palestine, IN
G	32	Trey Galloway (C)	6 ft 4 in (1.93 m)	203 lb (92 kg)	Jr	Culver Academies	Culver, IN

Head coach

- Mike Woodson (Indiana)

Assistant coach(es)

- Kenya Hunter (Duquesne)
- Yasir Rosemond (Oregon)
- Brian Walsh (Akron)

Legend

- (C) Team captain
- (S) Suspended
- (I) Ineligible
- (W) Walk-on
- Injured
- Current redshirt

Roster
Last update: August 29, 2023

== Schedule and results ==
Date time, TV	Rank^{#}	Opponent^{#}	Result	Record	High points	High rebounds	High assists	Site (attendance) city, state
Exhibition
October 29, 2023*; 1:00 pm, BTN Plus		UIndy	W 74–52	–	14 – Tied	8 – Mgbako	5 – Johnson	Simon Skjodt Assembly Hall (17,222); Bloomington, IN
November 3, 2023*; 6:30 pm, BTN Plus		Marian	W 94–61	–	20 – Ware	11 – Ware	7 – Johnson	Simon Skjodt Assembly Hall (17,222); Bloomington, IN
Regular season
November 7, 2023*; 6:30 pm, BTN		Florida Gulf Coast; Bill Garrett Game	W 69–63	1–0	16 – Galloway	12 – Ware	4 – Ware	Simon Skjodt Assembly Hall (17,222); Bloomington, IN
November 12, 2023*; 7:00 pm, BTN		Army; Salute to Service	W 72–64	2–0	20 – Ware	7 – Reneau	5 – Tied	Simon Skjodt Assembly Hall (17,222); Bloomington, IN
November 16, 2023*; 7:00 pm, BTN		Wright State	W 89–80	3–0	22 – Ware	12 – Ware	6 – Galloway	Simon Skjodt Assembly Hall (17,222); Bloomington, IN
November 19, 2023*; 1:00 pm, ESPN		vs. No. 5 UConn; Empire Classic semifinals	L 57–77	3–1	18 – Reneau	8 – Ware	2 – Cupps	Madison Square Garden (–); New York City, NY
November 20, 2023*; 4:30 pm, ESPNU		vs. Louisville; Empire Classic consolation game	W 74–66	4–1	14 – Johnson	8 – Banks	5 – Johnson	Madison Square Garden (–); New York City, NY
November 26, 2023*; 4:30 pm, BTN		vs. Harvard	W 89–76	5–1	28 – Ware	8 – Tied	5 – Tied	Gainbridge Fieldhouse (8,469); Indianapolis, IN
December 1, 2023; 7:00 pm, BTN		Maryland	W 65–53	6–1 (1–0)	18 – Ware	14 – Ware	6 – Galloway	Simon Skjodt Assembly Hall (17,222); Bloomington, IN
December 5, 2023; 9:00 pm, Peacock		at Michigan	W 78–75	7–1 (2–0)	15 – Reneau	8 – Ware	2 – Tied	Crisler Center (11,396); Ann Arbor, MI
December 9, 2023*; 2:00 pm, ESPN2		vs. Auburn; Holiday Hoopsgiving	L 76–104	7–2	15 – Reneau	8 – Ware	3 – Reneau	State Farm Arena (8,623); Atlanta, GA
December 16, 2023*; 12:30 pm, CBS		No. 2 Kansas	L 71–75	7–3	28 – Galloway	15 – Ware	4 – Reneau	Simon Skjodt Assembly Hall (17,222); Bloomington, IN
December 19, 2023*; 6:30 pm, BTN		Morehead State	W 69–68	8–3	18 – Walker	9 – Tied	3 – Banks	Simon Skjodt Assembly Hall (15,852); Bloomington, IN
December 21, 2023*; 8:30 pm, BTN		North Alabama	W 83–66	9–3	25 – Reneau	7 – Reneau	9 – Galloway	Simon Skjodt Assembly Hall (15,865); Bloomington, IN
December 29, 2023*; 6:00 pm, BTN Plus		Kennesaw State	W 100–87	10–3	34 – Reneau	11 – Reneau	7 – Galloway	Simon Skjodt Assembly Hall (16,689); Bloomington, IN
January 3, 2024; 9:00 pm, BTN		at Nebraska	L 70–86	10–4 (2–1)	20 – Ware	10 – Ware	5 – Reneau	Pinnacle Bank Arena (13,446); Lincoln, NE
January 6, 2024; 8:00 pm, FOX		Ohio State	W 71–65	11–4 (3–1)	23 – Reneau	7 – Reneau	7 – Galloway	Simon Skjodt Assembly Hall (16,584); Bloomington, IN
January 9, 2024; 7:00 pm, Peacock		at Rutgers	L 57–66	11–5 (3–2)	13 – Tied	17 – Ware	7 – Reneau	Jersey Mike's Arena (8,000); Piscataway, NJ
January 12, 2024; 6:30 pm, FS1		Minnesota	W 74–62	12–5 (4–2)	19 – Mgbako	14 – Ware	7 – Galloway	Simon Skjodt Assembly Hall (17,222); Bloomington, IN
January 16, 2024; 7:00 pm, Peacock		No. 2 Purdue; Rivalry/Indiana National Guard Governor's Cup	L 66–87	12–6 (4–3)	17 – Galloway	9 – Reneau	5 – Galloway	Simon Skjodt Assembly Hall (17,222); Bloomington, IN
January 19, 2024; 8:30 pm, FS1		at No. 11 Wisconsin	L 79–91	12–7 (4–4)	28 – Reneau	8 – Reneau	2 – Tied	Kohl Center (15,271); Madison, WI
January 27, 2024; 3:00 pm, FOX		at No. 10 Illinois; Rivalry	L 62–70	12–8 (4–5)	21 – Reneau	12 – Mgbako	2 – Tied	State Farm Center (15,544); Champaign, IL
January 30, 2024; 7:00 pm, BTN		Iowa	W 74–68	13–8 (5–5)	23 – Ware	10 – Ware	4 – Galloway	Simon Skjodt Assembly Hall (17,222); Bloomington, IN
February 3, 3024; 12:00 pm, FS1		Penn State	L 71–85	13–9 (5–6)	25 – Ware	11 – Ware	6 – Galloway	Simon Skjodt Assembly Hall (17,222); Bloomington, IN
February 6, 2024; 7:00 pm, Peacock		at Ohio State	W 76–73	14–9 (6–6)	26 – Reneau	14 – Reneau	4 – Galloway	Value City Arena (11,157); Columbus, OH
February 10, 2024; 8:00 pm, FOX		at No. 2 Purdue; Rivalry/Indiana National Guard Governor's Cup	L 59–79	14–10 (6–7)	13 – Gunn	8 – Ware	7 – Galloway	Mackey Arena (14,876); West Lafayette, IN
February 18, 2024; 3:00 pm, FS1		Northwestern	L 72–76	14–11 (6–8)	22 – Ware	16 – Ware	12 – Galloway	Simon Skjodt Assembly Hall (17,222); Bloomington, IN
February 21, 2024; 8:30 pm, BTN		Nebraska	L 70–85	14–12 (6–9)	22 – Mgbako	12 – Ware	6 – Reneau	Simon Skjodt Assembly Hall (17,222); Bloomington, IN
February 24, 2024; 12:00 pm, BTN		at Penn State	L 74–83	14–13 (6–10)	27 – Reneau	8 – Ware	5 – Galloway	Bryce Jordan Center (11,578); University Park, PA
February 27, 2024; 7:00 pm, Peacock		Wisconsin	W 74–70	15–13 (7–10)	27 – Ware	11 – Ware	12 – Galloway	Simon Skjodt Assembly Hall (17,222); Bloomington, IN
March 3, 2024; 2:00 pm, CBS		at Maryland	W 83–78	16–13 (8–10)	24 – Mgbako	15 – Ware	6 – Johnson	Xfinity Center (16,540); College Park, MD
March 6, 2024; 9:00 pm, BTN		at Minnesota	W 70–58	17–13 (9–10)	26 – Ware	11 – Ware	11 – Galloway	Williams Arena (9,002); Minneapolis, MN
March 10, 2024; 4:30 pm, CBS		Michigan State; Senior Day	W 65–64	18–13 (10–10)	28 – Ware	12 – Ware	5 – Reneau	Simon Skjodt Assembly Hall (16,304); Bloomington, IN
Big Ten Tournament
March 14, 2024; 9:08 pm, BTN	(6)	vs. (11) Penn State; Second round	W 61–59	19–13	18 – Ware	14 – Ware	5 – Johnson	Target Center (12,338); Minneapolis, MN
March 15, 2024; 9:00 pm, BTN	(6)	vs. (3) Nebraska; Quarterfinals	L 66–93	19–14	17 – Gunn	7 – Tied	5 – Johnson	Target Center (12,625); Minneapolis, MN
*Non-conference game. ^{#}Rankings from AP Poll. (#) Tournament seedings in parentheses. All times are in Eastern Time.

== Player statistics ==
Individual player statistics (final)
			Minutes		Scoring		Total FGs			3-point FGs			Free-throws			Rebounds							
Player	GP	GS	Tot	Avg	Pts	Avg	FG	FGA	Pct	3FG	3FGA	Pct	FT	FTA	Pct	Off	Def	Tot	Avg	A	Stl	Blk	TO
Banks, Kaleb	21	0	222	10.6	54	2.6	20	51	.392	5	20	.250	9	19	.474	13	24	37	1.8	17	4	5	9
Burke, Shaan	1	0	1	1.0	0	0.0	0	0	.000	0	0	.000	0	0	.000	0	0	0	0.0	0	0	0	0
Creel, Jackson	1	0	1	1.0	0	0.0	0	0	.000	0	0	.000	0	0	.000	0	0	0	0.0	0	0	0	0
Cupps, Gabe	33	22	715	21.7	86	2.6	32	88	.364	14	39	.359	8	13	.615	2	58	60	1.8	41	22	0	27
Galloway, Trey	31	31	1034	33.4	328	10.6	131	281	.466	26	100	.260	40	75	.533	27	62	89	2.9	143	36	6	66
Gunn, CJ	29	0	371	12.8	113	3.9	41	120	.342	17	50	.340	14	21	.667	6	22	28	1.0	16	24	4	16
Johnson, Xavier	20	13	514	25.7	151	7.6	48	113	.425	11	30	.367	44	64	.688	12	39	51	2.6	56	16	6	45
Leal, Anthony	21	0	308	14.7	51	2.4	16	36	.444	9	19	.474	10	16	.625	9	36	45	2.1	24	8	5	14
Mgbako, Mackenzie	33	33	895	27.1	404	12.2	131	332	.395	50	153	.327	92	112	.821	34	101	135	4.1	43	14	12	41
Newton, Jakai	0	0	0	0.0	0	0.0	0	0	.000	0	0	.000	0	0	.000	0	0	0	0.0	0	0	0	0
Reneau, Malik	33	33	945	28.6	508	15.4	198	355	.558	15	45	.333	97	142	.683	59	138	197	6.0	88	18	19	93
Sparks, Payton	24	2	179	7.5	51	2.1	18	35	.514	0	0	.000	15	36	.417	14	30	44	1.8	6	5	9	8
Stephens, Ian	1	0	1	1.0	0	0.0	0	0	.000	0	0	.000	0	0	.000	0	0	0	0.0	0	0	0	0
Walker, Anthony	32	1	452	14.1	162	5.1	56	115	.483	2	17	.118	48	64	.750	15	60	75	2.3	25	6	11	21
Ware, Kel'el	30	30	962	32.1	478	15.9	188	321	.586	17	40	.425	85	134	.634	63	233	296	9.9	45	18	56	47
Total	33		6600	200.0	2386	72.30	879	1848	.476	166	513	.324	462	696	.664	293	861	1154	35.0	504	171	133	400
Opponents	33		6600	200.0	2452	74.30	845	2013	.420	284	829	.343	478	637	.750	363	792	1155	35.0	446	247	101	341

Legend
GP	Games played	GS	Games started	Avg	Average per game
FG	Field-goals made	FGA	Field-goal attempts	Off	Offensive rebounds
Def	Defensive rebounds	A	Assists	TO	Turnovers
Blk	Blocks	Stl	Steals	High	Team high

== Rankings ==
Ranking movements Legend: ██ Increase in ranking ██ Decrease in ranking — = Not ranked RV = Received votes
	Week																			
Poll	Pre	1	2	3	4	5	6	7	8	9	10	11	12	13	14	15	16	17	18	Final
AP	RV	—	—	—	—	—	—	—	—	—	—	—	—	—	—	—	—	—	—	—
Coaches	RV	—	—	—	—	RV	—	RV	N/A	—	—	—	—	—	—	—	—	—	—	—

== Awards and honors ==
=== Pre-season awards ===
Name	Award	Date
Xavier Johnson	Almanac Preseason Second Team All-Big Ten	September 28, 2023
Xavier Johnson	Fox Sports Second Team All-Big Ten	October 9, 2023
Mackenzie Mgbako	247 Preseason Freshman Third Team All-American	October 12, 2023
Kel'el Ware	Preseason Watchlist for the 2024 Kareem Abdul-Jabbar Award	October 27, 2023

=== In-season awards ===
Name	Award	Date
Malik Reneau	Empire Classic All-Tournament Team	November 21, 2023
Mackenzie Mgbako	Big Ten Freshman of the Week	January 2, 2024; February 26, 2024

=== Post-season awards ===
Name	Award	Date
Kel'el Ware	Big Ten All-Defensive Team	March 12, 2024
Kel'el Ware	Second Team All-Big Ten (Media)	March 12, 2024
Kel'el Ware	Third Team All-Big Ten (Coaches)	March 12, 2024
Mackenzie Mgbako	Big Ten Co-Freshman of the Year (Coaches)	March 12, 2024
Mackenzie Mgbako	Big Ten All-Freshman Team	March 12, 2024
Trey Galloway	Indiana's Big Ten Sportsmanship Award	March 12, 2024
Malik Reneau	Big Ten Honorable Mention (Coaches and Media)	March 12, 2024
Kaleb Banks	Academic All-Big Ten	March 20, 2024
Shaan Burke	Academic All-Big Ten	March 20, 2024
CJ Gunn	Academic All-Big Ten	March 20, 2024
Anthony Leal	Academic All-Big Ten	March 20, 2024

== NBA draftees ==
Year	Round	Pick	Name	Team
2024 NBA draft	1st	#15	Kel'el Ware	Miami Heat
