= Xavier Johnson (basketball) =

American basketball player (born 1999)

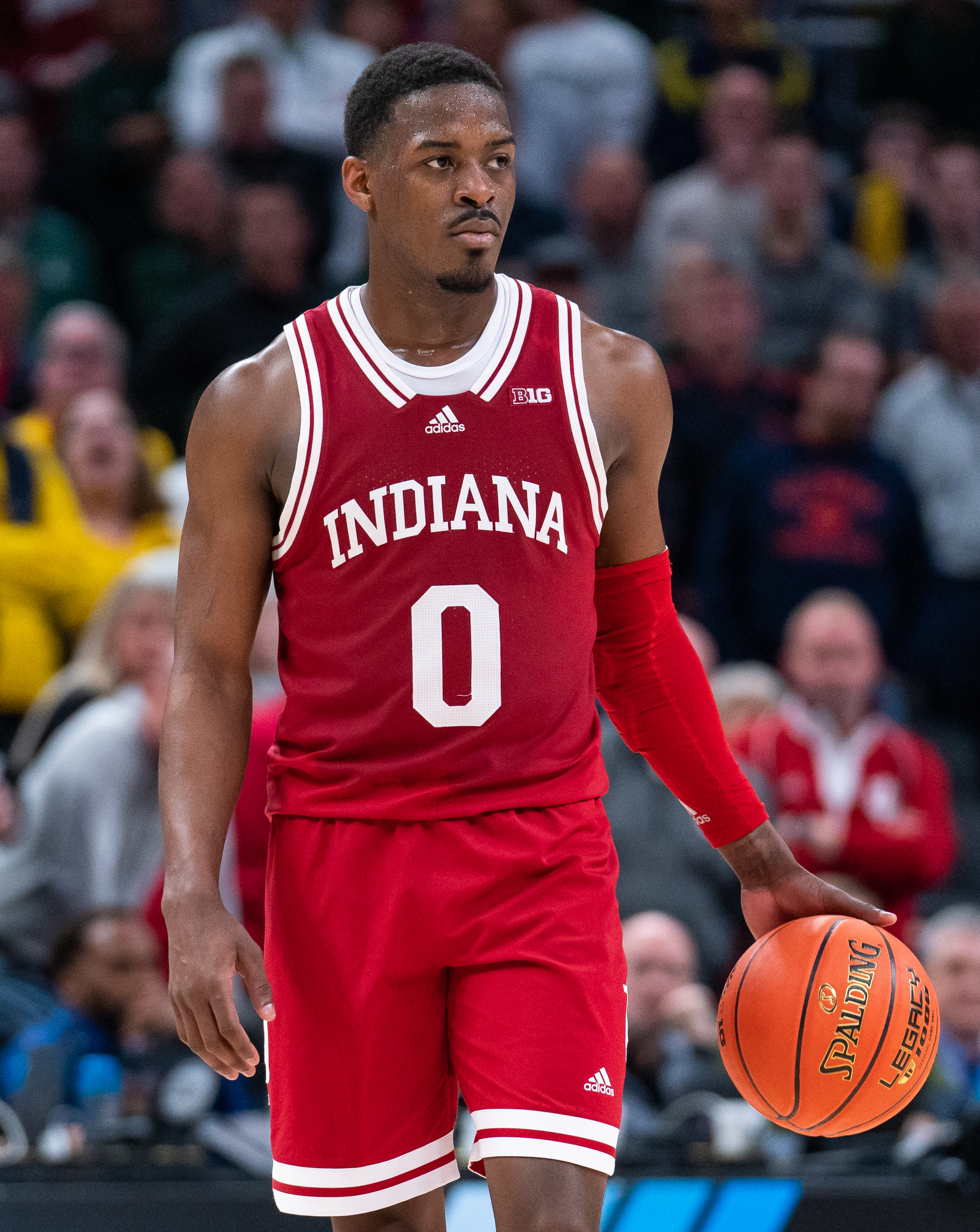
- Johnson with Indiana in 2022

Personal information
- Born: October 14, 1999 (age 27)
- Listed height: 6 ft 3 in (1.91 m)
- Listed weight: 200 lb (91 kg)

Career information
- High school: Bishop O'Connell (Arlington County, Virginia)
- College: Pittsburgh (2018–2021); Indiana (2021–2024)
- NBA draft: 2024: undrafted
- Playing career: 2024–present
- Position: Point guard

Career history
- 2024–2025: Memphis Hustle
- 2025: Rip City Remix
- 2025: Sioux Falls Skyforce

Career highlights
- ACC All-Freshman Team (2019)

Xavier Elijah Johnson (born October 14, 1999) is an American professional basketball player. He played college basketball for the Pittsburgh Panthers and for the Indiana Hoosiers.

== Early life and high school career ==
Johnson grew up in Spotsylvania County, Virginia but moved to Woodbridge, Virginia to be closer to Bishop O'Connell High School after he enrolled at the school. He entered high school at 5'6, but grew six inches by his senior year. He became Bishop O'Connell's starting point guard as a junior and was named second team All-Washington Catholic Athletic Conference (WCAC) after averaging 10.5 points, 4.2 rebounds, and 3.4 assists per game. Johnson was named the (WCAC) Player of the Year, as well as a first-team All-State and first-team All-Metro by The Washington Post, as a senior after averaging 18.4 points, four rebounds, and 4.3 assists per game. Rated the 39th-best point guard prospect in his class by ESPN and a three-star recruit by 247Sports, Johnson originally committed to playing college basketball for Nebraska over Georgetown and Georgia Tech. Johnson requested that Nebraska release him from his National Letter of Intent in the spring of his senior year after the departure of the assistant coach who recruited him. He ultimately committed to Pittsburgh.

== College career ==
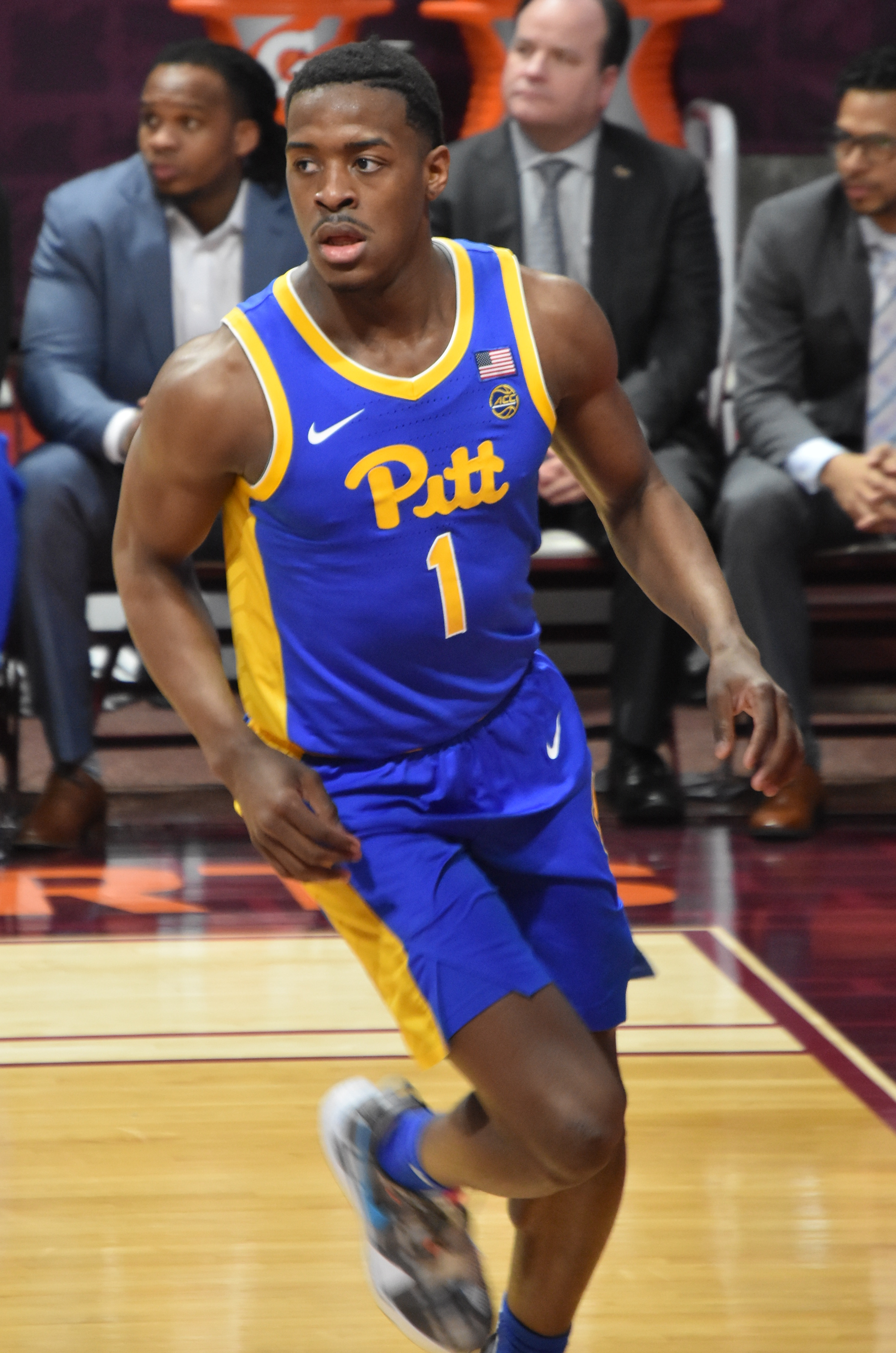
Johnson with Pittsburgh in 2020

=== Pittsburgh ===
As a freshman, Johnson led the Panthers with 15.5 points and 4.5 assists per game while also averaging 3.9 rebounds and 1.3 steals per game and was named to the Atlantic Coast Conference (ACC) All-Freshman team. He was the first Pitt freshman to lead the team is scoring since 1985 and was the only player in the ACC to average at least 15 points and 4.5 assists per game.

Going into his sophomore season (2019–20), Johnson was named the 75th-best collegiate basketball player by CBS Sports and the 51st-best prospect for the 2020 NBA draft by ESPN. Johnson scored 13 points in the Fort Myers TipOff against Kansas State, with four points coming in the last ten seconds to help secure a 63–59 win. He scored 20 points with six rebounds and six assists against North Carolina on January 18, 2020, to help close out the Panthers' first-ever season sweep of UNC. Johnson finished the season with 11.7 points, 4.9 assists, 3.7 rebounds and 1.8 steals per game. As a junior, he averaged 14.2 points, 5.7 assists and 3.4 rebounds per game.

=== Indiana ===
Johnson put his name in the transfer portal for his fourth year, the 2021–22 season. He chose to play for Indiana over Baylor, Houston, and Saint Joseph's, among others. Although Indiana already possessed two point guards, new Hoosiers coach Mike Woodson chose Johnson for the starting role.

Initially, his "aggressive style of play and headstrong attitude on the court" held him back. In early February Johnson was one of five Indiana players suspended by coach Mike Woodson for violating curfew but was reinstated on February 10, after missing one game. But through the course of the season Johnson found his footing. After a poor performance mid-season in the Crossroads Classic, Johnson gave "an almost perfect shooting performance" against Maryland with 24 points on 100 percent shooting from the floor and 7-of-8 from the free throw line, missing his only shot with 19 seconds left in the game. Johnson credited his mid-season turnaround to his grandfather's death in early February, along with strong chemistry with teammate Trayce Jackson-Davis. He ended the season averaging 12.1 points and 5.1 assists per game. His 172 assists that year were the 5th most in a season in Indiana Hoosiers men's basketball history.

Although Johnson played four seasons, he retained one more year of eligibility, allowing him to play in the 2022–23 season. Before the season began, he was named Honorable Mention All-Big Ten by the media. Johnson averaged 9.9 points, 3.3 rebounds and 4.9 assists per game. He broke his foot in a game against Kansas on December 17, 2022, forcing him to miss the rest of the season. Due to the injury occurring so early in the season, Johnson was granted a waiver to return for an unexpected 6th year, the 2023–24 season, which was his last for the Hoosiers.

== Professional career ==
=== Memphis Hustle (2024–2025) ===
After going undrafted in the 2024 NBA draft, Johnson joined the Austin Spurs on October 26, 2024 before being traded to the Memphis Hustle. On January 10, 2025, he was waived by the Hustle.

=== Rip City Remix (2025) ===
On January 18, 2025, Johnson joined the Rip City Remix, but was waived six days later.

=== Sioux Falls Skyforce (2025–2026) ===
On February 19, 2025, the Sioux Falls Skyforce acquired Johnson from the available player pool. He finished the season with the team, but was not extended for the next season.

== Career statistics ==
Legend
GP	Games played	GS	Games started	MPG	Minutes per game
FG%	Field goal percentage	3P%	3-point field goal percentage	FT%	Free throw percentage
RPG	Rebounds per game	APG	Assists per game	SPG	Steals per game
BPG	Blocks per game	PPG	Points per game	**Bold**	Career high

=== College ===
Year	Team	GP	GS	MPG	FG%	3P%	FT%	RPG	APG	SPG	BPG	PPG
2018–19	Pittsburgh	33	33	31.2	.415	.352	.751	**3.9**	4.5	1.3	.1	**15.5**
2019–20	Pittsburgh	33	32	**33.2**	.373	.330	.761	3.7	4.9	**1.8**	**.2**	11.7
2020–21	Pittsburgh	18	16	28.6	**.426**	.321	.787	3.4	**5.7**	1.3	**.2**	14.2
2021–22	Indiana	**34**	**34**	27.7	.406	**.383**	.782	3.8	5.1	1.2	.1	12.1
2022–23	Indiana	11	11	25.2	.415	.370	**.795**	3.3	4.9	1.2	.0	9.9
2023–24	Indiana	20	13	25.6	.425	.367	.688	2.6	3.8	.8	.3	7.6
Career		149	139	29.3	.405	.350	.761	3.5	4.7	1.1	.2	12.2

== Personal life ==
On April 3, 2022, Johnson was arrested in Bloomington, Indiana, for reckless driving and resisting arrest. He later remarked, "I thought my career was over, honestly. I got my second chance. I’m mad at myself for doing something like that, but I’m glad God gave me a second chance to come back and play, what I love to do." Head coach Mike Woodson, who said he took away Johnson's driving privileges, noted that Johnson grew a lot and took advantage of his second chance: "X has grown a lot, based on the things that he's done this summer. He's put himself in a wonderful position with me being the coach that I like everything about what X is doing now because he is doing the right things on and off the court."
