= 2022–23 Indiana Hoosiers men's basketball team =

American college basketball season

2022–23 Indiana Hoosiers men's basketball

NCAA tournament, Second Round
- Conference: Big Ten Conference

Ranking
- Coaches: No. 24
- AP: No. 21
- Record: 23–12 (12–8 Big Ten)
- Head coach: Mike Woodson (2nd season)
- Associate head coach: Kenya Hunter (3rd season); Yasir Rosemond (2nd season)
- Assistant coach: Brian Walsh (1st season)
- Captains: Trayce Jackson-Davis; Race Thompson
- Home arena: Simon Skjodt Assembly Hall

2022–23 Big Ten Conference men's basketball standings
	Conf.				Overall
Team	W		L	PCT	W		L	PCT
No. 3 Purdue †	15	–	5	.750	29	–	6	.829
No. 21 Indiana	12	–	8	.600	23	–	12	.657
Northwestern	12	–	8	.600	22	–	12	.647
Michigan State	11	–	8	.579	21	–	13	.618
Maryland	11	–	9	.550	22	–	13	.629
Illinois	11	–	9	.550	20	–	13	.606
Iowa	11	–	9	.550	19	–	14	.576
Michigan	11	–	9	.550	18	–	16	.529
Penn State	10	–	10	.500	23	–	14	.622
Rutgers	10	–	10	.500	19	–	15	.559
Wisconsin	9	–	11	.450	20	–	15	.571
Nebraska	9	–	11	.450	16	–	16	.500
Ohio State	5	–	15	.250	16	–	19	.457
Minnesota	2	–	17	.105	9	–	22	.290
† Conference tournament winner Rankings from AP poll

The 2022–23 Indiana Hoosiers men's basketball team represented Indiana University in the 2022–23 NCAA Division I men's basketball season. They were led by second-year head coach, and former Indiana standout, Mike Woodson. The team played its home games at Simon Skjodt Assembly Hall in Bloomington, Indiana, as a member of the Big Ten Conference. The season officially began with the annual event, Hoosier Hysteria (this year featuring G Herbo), on Friday, October 7, 2022.

The Hoosiers finished the regular season ranked No. 19 in the Associated Press poll. The team spent 16 weeks among the top-25 teams in the nation. The Hoosiers also captured a share of 2nd place in the Big Ten Conference with a 21–10 overall regular season record, 12–8 in Big Ten play, and the No. 3 seed in the Big Ten Conference tournament. IU advanced to the semifinals before losing a close game to Penn State. For the second year in a row, the team found themselves in the NCAA Tournament this time as a No. 4 seed, where they improved upon their performance last year by making it to the Round of 32 but falling to the No. 5 seed Miami (FL), 85–69.

== Previous season ==
The Hoosiers saw a list of streaks come to an end for the program. They finished the season 21–14 overall, and 9–11 in conference play. Along the way, IU ended losing streaks to Purdue, Michigan, and Illinois. As the #9 seed, they also advanced to the semifinals of the Big Ten Conference tournament, something they had not done since 2013. They lost to Iowa, 80–77, the eventual tournament champions. The Hoosiers also heard their name called on Selection Sunday for the first time since 2016. After a six-year absence from the NCAA tournament, IU was selected as a #12 seed to play in the NCAA tournament First Four round in Dayton, Ohio. They knocked off Wyoming to make it to the first round (round of 64), where they lost to #5 seed Saint Mary's.

== Offseason ==
=== Coaching changes ===
On March 23, 2022, Coach Woodson announced that assistant coach Dane Fife would not be retained for a second season. In his official statement, Woodson claimed, "Ultimately, I believe that the fit must be right with a coaching staff, and I’ve decided that a change is necessary. I appreciate everything Dane has done as a member of the staff during the last year and as player for our program. He will always be a part of the Hoosier family and I wish him well in his future pursuits."

News broke on March 25 that assistant coaches Kenya Hunter and Yasir Rosemond had been promoted to associate head coaches, as well as Brian Walsh from team and recruiting coordinator to assistant coach.

Coach Woodson announced new staff additions on May 9, 2022, of Steven Surface as the director of basketball operations, replacing Benny Sander, and former IU basketball standout Jordan Hulls as the new team and recruiting coordinator, filling the vacant spot left by the promotion of Walsh.

=== Departures ===
On April 9, 2022, Trayce Jackson-Davis announced that he would declare for the 2022 NBA draft, while still keeping his college eligibility. Jackson-Davis announced on May 20, 2022, via Twitter that he was withdrawing from the draft and would return to IU for a fourth year.

Indiana departures
Name	Number	Pos.	Height	Weight	Year	Hometown	Reason for departure
Rob Phinisee	1	G	6'1"	187	Junior	Lafayette, Indiana	Graduated/transferred to Cincinnati
Michael Durr	2	C	7'0"	250	Junior	Atlanta, Georgia	Transferred to UCF
Khristian Lander	4	G	6'2"	185	Freshman	Evansville, Indiana	Transferred to Western Kentucky
Parker Stewart	45	G	6'5"	202	RS junior	Union City, Tennessee	Graduated/transferred to UT Martin

=== Recruiting classes ===
==== 2022 recruiting class ====
College recruiting
Name	Hometown	School	Height	Weight	Commit date
CJ Gunn; SG	Indianapolis, IN	Lawrence North High School	6 ft 5 in (1.96 m)	175 lb (79 kg)	Feb 7, 2021
CJ Gunn; SG	Recruit ratings: Scout: Rivals: 247Sports: ESPN: (83)				
Kaleb Banks; F	Fayetteville, GA	Fayette County High School	6 ft 9 in (2.06 m)	215 lb (98 kg)	Jul 23, 2021
Kaleb Banks; F	Recruit ratings: Scout: Rivals: 247Sports: ESPN: (82)				
Jalen Hood-Schifino; PG	Pittsburgh, PA	Montverde Academy	6 ft 6 in (1.98 m)	210 lb (95 kg)	Aug 24, 2021
Jalen Hood-Schifino; PG	Recruit ratings: Scout: Rivals: 247Sports: ESPN: (91)				
Malik Reneau; F	Miami, FL	Montverde Academy	6 ft 8 in (2.03 m)	210 lb (95 kg)	Apr 18, 2022
Malik Reneau; F	Recruit ratings: Scout: Rivals: 247Sports: ESPN: (91)				
Overall recruit ranking:
Note: In many cases, Scout, Rivals, 247Sports, On3, and ESPN may conflict in their listings of height and weight.; In these cases, the average was taken. ESPN grades are on a 100-point scale.; Sources: "2022 Team Ranking". Rivals.

==== 2023 recruiting class ====
College recruiting (2023)
Name	Hometown	School	Height	Weight	Commit date
Jakai Newton; CG	Covington, GA	Newton High School	6 ft 3 in (1.91 m)	190 lb (86 kg)	Oct 22, 2021
Jakai Newton; CG	Recruit ratings: Scout: Rivals: 247Sports: ESPN: (N/A)				
Gabe Cupps; PG	Dayton, OH	Centerville High School	6 ft 2 in (1.88 m)	165 lb (75 kg)	Nov 16, 2021
Gabe Cupps; PG	Recruit ratings: Scout: Rivals: 247Sports: ESPN: (N/A)				
Overall recruit ranking:
Note: In many cases, Scout, Rivals, 247Sports, On3, and ESPN may conflict in their listings of height and weight.; In these cases, the average was taken. ESPN grades are on a 100-point scale.; Sources: "2023 Team Ranking". Rivals.

== Roster ==
Note: Players' year is based on remaining eligibility. The NCAA did not count the 2020–21 season towards eligibility.

2022–23 Indiana Hoosiers men's basketball team
Players
Coaches

Pos.	#	Name	Height	Weight	Year	Previous school	Hometown
G	0	Xavier Johnson (injured)	6 ft 3 in (1.91 m)	200 lb (91 kg)	Sr	Bishop O'Connell/Pitt	Woodbridge, VA
G	1	Jalen Hood-Schifino	6 ft 6 in (1.98 m)	213 lb (97 kg)	Fr	Montverde Academy	Pittsburgh, PA
G	3	Anthony Leal	6 ft 5 in (1.96 m)	200 lb (91 kg)	So	Bloomington South	Bloomington, IN
G	4	Michael Shipp (W)	6 ft 3 in (1.91 m)	195 lb (88 kg)	Jr	Moeller	Cincinnati, OH
F	5	Malik Reneau	6 ft 9 in (2.06 m)	233 lb (106 kg)	Fr	Montverde Academy	Miami, FL
F	10	Kaleb Banks	6 ft 7 in (2.01 m)	215 lb (98 kg)	Fr	Fayette County	Hampton, GA
G	11	CJ Gunn	6 ft 6 in (1.98 m)	194 lb (88 kg)	Fr	Lawrence North	Indianapolis, IN
F	12	Miller Kopp	6 ft 7 in (2.01 m)	215 lb (98 kg)	Sr	Houston Christian/Northwestern	Houston, TX
G	13	Shaan Burke (W)	6 ft 5 in (1.96 m)	195 lb (88 kg)	So	Vista	San Diego, CA
F	14	Nathan Childress (W)	6 ft 6 in (1.98 m)	212 lb (96 kg)	Jr	Zionsville	Zionsville, IN
F	22	Jordan Geronimo	6 ft 6 in (1.98 m)	225 lb (102 kg)	So	St. Paul's School	Newark, NJ
F	23	Trayce Jackson-Davis	6 ft 9 in (2.06 m)	245 lb (111 kg)	Jr	Center Grove	Greenwood, IN
F	25	Race Thompson	6 ft 8 in (2.03 m)	235 lb (107 kg)	RS Sr	Armstrong	Plymouth, MN
F	31	Hogan Orbaugh (W)	6 ft 8 in (2.03 m)	235 lb (107 kg)	Jr	Zionsville/Louisville	Zionsville, IN
G	32	Trey Galloway	6 ft 4 in (1.93 m)	203 lb (92 kg)	So	Culver Academies	Culver, IN
C	51	Logan Duncomb	6 ft 10 in (2.08 m)	241 lb (109 kg)	So	Moeller	Cincinnati, OH
G	53	Tamar Bates	6 ft 5 in (1.96 m)	198 lb (90 kg)	So	IMG Academy	Kansas City, KS

Head coach

- Mike Woodson (Indiana)

Assistant coach(es)

- Kenya Hunter (Duquesne)
- Yasir Rosemond (Oregon)
- Brian Walsh (Akron)

Legend

- (C) Team captain
- (S) Suspended
- (I) Ineligible
- (W) Walk-on
- Injured
- Current redshirt

Roster
Last update: October 21, 2022

== Schedule and results ==
Date time, TV	Rank^{#}	Opponent^{#}	Result	Record	High points	High rebounds	High assists	Site (attendance) city, state
Exhibition
October 29, 2022*; 3:00 pm, BTN+	No. 13	Marian	W 78–42		14 – Reneau	11 – Tied	4 – Hood-Schifino	Simon Skjodt Assembly Hall (17,222); Bloomington, IN
November 3, 2022*; 7:00 pm, BTN+	No. 13	St. Francis	W 104–59		19 – Jackson-Davis	9 – Jackson-Davis	5 – Hood-Schifino	Simon Skjodt Assembly Hall (17,222); Bloomington, IN
Regular season
November 7, 2022*; 7:00 pm, BTN+	No. 13	Morehead State	W 88–53	1–0	15 – Tied	7 – Jackson-Davis	4 – Hood-Schifino	Simon Skjodt Assembly Hall (17,222); Bloomington, IN
November 10, 2022*; 8:30 pm, BTN	No. 13	Bethune–Cookman	W 101–49	2–0	21 – Jackson-Davis	6 – Jackson-Davis	8 – Hood-Schifino	Simon Skjodt Assembly Hall (17,222); Bloomington, IN
November 18, 2022*; 6:00 pm, FS1	No. 12	at Xavier; Gavitt Tipoff Games	W 81–79	3–0	30 – Jackson-Davis	8 – Thompson	4 – Tied	Cintas Center (10,586); Cincinnati, OH
November 20, 2022*; 5:30 pm, BTN	No. 12	vs. Miami (OH); Hoosier Classic	W 86–56	4–0	17 – Jackson-Davis	16 – Jackson-Davis	4 – Johnson	Gainbridge Fieldhouse (8,737); Indianapolis, IN
November 23, 2022*; 6:30 pm, BTN	No. 11	Little Rock; Hoosier Classic	W 87–68	5–0	20 – Thompson	8 – Thompson	10 – Johnson	Simon Skjodt Assembly Hall (11,829); Bloomington, IN
November 25, 2022*; 12:30 pm, BTN	No. 11	Jackson State; Hoosier Classic	W 90–51	6–0	22 – Bates	6 – Geronimo	6 – Hood-Schifino	Simon Skjodt Assembly Hall (13,135); Bloomington, IN
November 30, 2022*; 9:15 pm, ESPN	No. 10	No. 18 North Carolina; ACC–Big Ten Challenge	W 77–65	7–0	21 – Jackson-Davis	10 – Jackson-Davis	4 – Tied	Simon Skjodt Assembly Hall (17,222); Bloomington, IN
December 3, 2022; 4:00 pm, BTN	No. 10	at Rutgers	L 48–63	7–1 (0–1)	21 – Kopp	10 – Jackson-Davis	4 – Johnson	Jersey Mike's Arena (8,000); Piscataway, NJ
December 7, 2022; 8:30 pm, BTN	No. 14	Nebraska	W 81–65	8–1 (1–1)	20 – Galloway	11 – Jackson-Davis	10 – Jackson-Davis	Simon Skjodt Assembly Hall (17,222); Bloomington, IN
December 10, 2022*; 7:30 pm, FOX	No. 14	vs. No. 10 Arizona; Las Vegas Clash	L 75–89	8–2	16 – Thompson	9 – Thompson	11 – Johnson	MGM Grand Garden Arena (13,357); Las Vegas, NV
December 17, 2022*; 12:00 pm, ESPN2	No. 14	at No. 8 Kansas	L 62–84	8–3	13 – Jackson-Davis	6 – Tied	4 – Hood-Schifino	Allen Fieldhouse (16,300); Lawrence, KS
December 20, 2022*; 7:00 pm, BTN	No. 18	Elon	W 96–72	9–3	18 – Thompson	11 – Thompson	7 – Hood-Schifino	Simon Skjodt Assembly Hall (12,356); Bloomington, IN
December 23, 2022*; 7:00 pm, BTN	No. 18	Kennesaw State	W 69–55	10–3	19 – Bates	14 – Thompson	3 – Tied	Simon Skjodt Assembly Hall (12,978); Bloomington, IN
January 5, 2023; 9:00 pm, FS1	No. 15	at Iowa	L 89–91	10–4 (1–2)	30 – Jackson-Davis	9 – Tied	9 – Hood-Schifino	Carver–Hawkeye Arena (11,916); Iowa City, IA
January 8, 2023; 12:00 pm, FS1	No. 15	Northwestern	L 83–84	10–5 (1–3)	33 – Hood-Schifino	24 – Jackson-Davis	8 – Jackson-Davis	Simon Skjodt Assembly Hall (16,759); Bloomington, IN
January 11, 2023; 7:00 pm, BTN		at Penn State	L 66–85	10–6 (1–4)	14 – Jackson-Davis	11 – Jackson-Davis	4 – Tied	Bryce Jordan Center (8,502); University Park, PA
January 14, 2023; 1:00 pm, CBS		No. 18 Wisconsin	W 63–45	11–6 (2–4)	18 – Jackson-Davis	12 – Jackson-Davis	4 – Tied	Simon Skjodt Assembly Hall (17,222); Bloomington, IN
January 19, 2023; 8:30 pm, FS1		at Illinois; Rivalry	W 80–65	12–6 (3–4)	35 – Jackson-Davis	9 – Jackson-Davis	5 – Jackson-Davis	State Farm Center (15,544); Champaign, IL
January 22, 2023; 12:00 pm, CBS		Michigan State	W 82–69	13–6 (4–4)	31 – Jackson-Davis	15 – Jackson-Davis	4 – Jackson-Davis	Simon Skjodt Assembly Hall (17,222); Bloomington, IN
January 25, 2023; 9:00 pm, BTN		at Minnesota	W 61–57	14–6 (5–4)	25 – Jackson-Davis	21 – Jackson-Davis	5 – Galloway	Williams Arena (9,276); Minneapolis, MN
January 28, 2023; 8:00 pm, FOX		Ohio State	W 86–70	15–6 (6–4)	24 – Hood-Schifino	10 – Jackson-Davis	6 – Jackson-Davis	Simon Skjodt Assembly Hall (17,222); Bloomington, IN
January 31, 2023; 9:00 pm, ESPN2	No. 21	at Maryland	L 55–66	15–7 (6–5)	18 – Jackson-Davis	20 – Jackson-Davis	4 – Hood-Schifino	Xfinity Center (14,583); College Park, MD
February 4, 2023; 4:00 pm, ESPN	No. 21	No. 1 Purdue; Rivalry/Indiana National Guard Governor's Cup	W 79–74	16–7 (7–5)	25 – Jackson-Davis	7 – Jackson-Davis	4 – Hood-Schifino	Simon Skjodt Assembly Hall (17,222); Bloomington, IN
February 7, 2023; 6:30 pm, BTN	No. 18	No. 24 Rutgers	W 66–60	17–7 (8–5)	20 – Jackson-Davis	18 – Jackson-Davis	6 – Jackson-Davis	Simon Skjodt Assembly Hall (17,222); Bloomington, IN
February 11, 2023; 6:00 pm, ESPN	No. 18	at Michigan	W 62–61	18–7 (9–5)	28 – Jackson-Davis	11 – Jackson-Davis	5 – Hood-Schifino	Crisler Center (12,707); Ann Arbor, MI
February 15, 2023; 9:00 pm, BTN	No. 14	at Northwestern	L 62–64	18–8 (9–6)	23 – Jackson-Davis	10 – Jackson-Davis	8 – Jackson-Davis	Welsh–Ryan Arena (7,039); Evanston, IL
February 18, 2023; 12:00 pm, ESPN	No. 14	Illinois; Rivalry	W 71–68	19–8 (10–6)	26 – Jackson-Davis	12 – Jackson-Davis	5 – Galloway	Simon Skjodt Assembly Hall (17,222); Bloomington, IN
February 21, 2023; 9:00 pm, ESPN	No. 17	at Michigan State	L 65–80	19–9 (10–7)	19 – Jackson-Davis	7 – Jackson-Davis	5 – Jackson-Davis	Breslin Center (14,797); East Lansing, MI
February 25, 2023; 7:30 pm, FOX	No. 17	at No. 5 Purdue; Rivalry/Indiana National Guard Governor's Cup	W 79–71	20–9 (11–7)	35 – Hood-Schifino	8 – Jackson-Davis	7 – Jackson-Davis	Mackey Arena (14,804); West Lafayette, IN
February 28, 2023; 7:00 pm, ESPN2	No. 15	Iowa	L 68–90	20–10 (11–8)	26 – Jackson-Davis	13 – Jackson-Davis	5 – Jackson-Davis	Simon Skjodt Assembly Hall (17,222); Bloomington, IN
March 5, 2023; 4:30 pm, CBS	No. 15	Michigan	W 75–73 ^{OT}	21–10 (12–8)	27 – Jackson-Davis	10 – Thompson	6 – Jackson-Davis	Simon Skjodt Assembly Hall (17,222); Bloomington, IN
Big Ten Tournament
March 10, 2023; 9:00 pm, BTN	(3) No. 19	vs. (6) Maryland; Quarterfinals	W 70–60	22–10	24 – Jackson-Davis	11 – Reneau	7 – Jackson-Davis	United Center (18,892); Chicago, IL
March 11, 2023; 3:30 pm, CBS	(3) No. 19	vs. (10) Penn State; Semifinals	L 73–77	22–11	24 – Jackson-Davis	10 – Jackson-Davis	7 – Jackson-Davis	United Center (18,059); Chicago, IL
NCAA Tournament
March 17, 2023*; 9:55 pm, TBS	(4 MW) No. 21	vs. (13 MW) Kent State; First Round	W 71–60	23–11	24 – Jackson-Davis	11 – Jackson-Davis	5 – Jackson-Davis	MVP Arena (13,989); Albany, NY
March 19, 2023*; 8:40 pm, TNT	(4 MW) No. 21	vs. (5 MW) No. 16 Miami (FL); Second Round	L 69–85	23–12	23 – Jackson-Davis	8 – Jackson-Davis	3 – Hood-Schifino	MVP Arena (13,984); Albany, NY
*Non-conference game. ^{#}Rankings from AP Poll. (#) Tournament seedings in parentheses. All times are in Eastern Time.

== Player statistics ==
Individual player statistics (final)
			Minutes		Scoring		Total FGs			3-point FGs			Free-throws			Rebounds							
Player	GP	GS	Tot	Avg	Pts	Avg	FG	FGA	Pct	3FG	3FGA	Pct	FT	FTA	Pct	Off	Def	Tot	Avg	A	Stl	Blk	TO
Banks, Kaleb	24	0	135	5.6	49	2.0	16	29	.552	2	5	.400	15	28	.536	6	15	21	0.9	8	4	2	9
Bates, Tamar	35	2	714	20.4	214	6.1	76	194	.392	37	99	.374	25	27	.926	10	46	56	1.6	39	16	2	25
Childress, Nathan	5	0	10	2.0	0	0.0	0	1	.000	0	1	.000	0	0	.000	0	1	1	0.2	1	1	0	0
Duncomb, Logan	9	0	53	5.9	26	2.9	12	16	.750	0	0	.000	2	7	.286	5	10	15	1.7	2	1	5	3
Galloway, Trey	32	25	881	27.5	213	6.7	77	163	.472	30	65	.462	29	45	.644	20	76	96	3.0	66	22	2	24
Geronimo, Jordan	27	6	332	12.3	113	4.2	46	84	.548	5	19	.263	16	26	.615	22	44	66	2.4	8	13	23	17
Gunn, CJ	20	0	152	7.6	40	2.0	17	55	.309	2	24	.083	4	5	.800	3	9	12	0.6	8	10	2	5
Hood-Schifino, Jalen	32	32	1061	33.2	432	13.5	168	403	.417	37	111	.333	59	76	.776	14	118	132	4.1	117	26	8	89
Jackson-Davis, Trayce	32	32	1107	34.6	670	20.9	262	450	.582	0	0	.000	146	210	.695	91	255	346	10.8	129	27	92	82
Johnson, Xavier	11	11	276	25.1	109	9.9	34	82	.415	10	27	.370	31	39	.795	2	34	36	3.3	54	13	0	31
Kopp, Miller	35	35	1058	30.2	282	8.1	100	208	.481	63	142	.444	19	23	.826	14	75	89	2.5	43	24	5	22
Leal, Anthony	11	0	23	2.1	2	0.2	0	0	.000	0	0	.000	2	2	1.000	0	2	2	0.2	1	1	0	1
Reneau, Malik	35	3	526	15.0	215	6.1	89	161	.553	2	8	.250	35	49	.714	40	91	131	3.7	27	16	9	48
Shipp, Michael	3	0	2	0.7	0	0.0	0	0	.000	0	0	.000	0	0	.000	0	0	0	0.0	0	0	0	0
Thompson, Race	30	29	695	23.2	251	8.4	97	197	.492	12	43	.279	45	65	.692	48	107	155	5.2	30	29	27	32
Total	35		7025	200.7	2616	74.74	994	2043	.487	200	544	.368	428	602	.711	321	929	1250	35.7	533	203	177	403
Opponents			7025	200.7	2404	68.69	852	2084	.409	263	787	.334	437	621	.704	379	820	1199	34.3	408	230	110	391

Legend
GP	Games played	GS	Games started	Avg	Average per game
FG	Field-goals made	FGA	Field-goal attempts	Off	Offensive rebounds
Def	Defensive rebounds	A	Assists	TO	Turnovers
Blk	Blocks	Stl	Steals	High	Team high

== Rankings ==
Ranking movements Legend: ██ Increase in ranking ██ Decrease in ranking — = Not ranked RV = Received votes т = Tied with team above or below
	Week																			
Poll	Pre	1	2	3	4	5	6	7	8	9	10	11	12	13	14	15	16	17	18	Final
AP	13	12	11	10	14	14	18	16	15	RV	—	RV	21	18	14	17	15	19	21	Not released
Coaches	14	13	11	8	11	16	21	18	19	RV	RV	RV	22	18	15	17	13	17	19т	24

*AP does not release post-NCAA Tournament rankings.

== Awards and honors ==
=== Pre-season awards ===
Name	Award	Date
Trayce Jackson-Davis	Blue Ribbon Preseason First Team All-American	August 22, 2022
Trayce Jackson-Davis	Almanac Preseason Second Team All-American	September 28, 2022
Trayce Jackson-Davis	Big Ten Preseason Player of the Year	October 6, 2022
Trayce Jackson-Davis	Preseason All-Big Ten Team	October 6, 2022
Trayce Jackson-Davis	CBS Sports Preseason Second Team All-American	October 20, 2022
Trayce Jackson-Davis	Associated Press Preseason All-American	October 24, 2022
Trayce Jackson-Davis	The Athletic Preseason Second Team All-American	October 24, 2022
Trayce Jackson-Davis	Sporting News Preseason First Team All-American	November 8, 2022

=== In-season awards ===
Name	Award	Date
Trayce Jackson-Davis	NCAA Player of the Week	November 21, 2022; January 23, 2023
Trayce Jackson-Davis	ESPN Player of the Week	January 23, 2023
Trayce Jackson-Davis	Naismith Trophy Player of the Week	January 23, 2023
Trayce Jackson-Davis	Big Ten Player of the Week	January 23, 2023; January 30, 2023; February 6, 2023; February 13, 2023; March 6, 2023
Jalen Hood-Schifino	Big Ten Freshman of the Week	January 9, 2023; January 30, 2023; February 13, 2023; February 27, 2023
Jalen Hood-Schifino	Big Ten Player of the Week	February 27, 2023

=== Post-season awards ===
Name	Award	Date
Trayce Jackson-Davis	Sporting News First Team All-American	March 7, 2023
Trayce Jackson-Davis	Field of 68 First Team All-American	March 7, 2023
Trayce Jackson-Davis	First Team All-Big Ten (Media and Coaches)	March 7, 2023
Trayce Jackson-Davis	Big Ten All-Defensive Team	March 7, 2023
Trayce Jackson-Davis	Big Ten All-Tournament Team	March 12, 2023
Trayce Jackson-Davis	USBWA All-District Team	March 14, 2023
Trayce Jackson-Davis	NABC First Team All-District	March 14, 2023
Trayce Jackson-Davis	AP First Team All-American	March 14, 2023
Trayce Jackson-Davis	NABC First Team All-American	March 15, 2023
Trayce Jackson-Davis	USBWA First Team All-American	March 15, 2023
Trayce Jackson-Davis	CBS Sports First Team All-American	March 30, 2023
Trayce Jackson-Davis	Wooden All-America Team	March 30, 2023
Trayce Jackson-Davis	Karl Malone Award	April 1, 2023
Jalen Hood-Schifino	Big Ten Freshman of the Year	March 7, 2023
Jalen Hood-Schifino	Second Team All-Big Ten (Media)	March 7, 2023
Jalen Hood-Schifino	Third Team All-Big Ten (Coaches)	March 7, 2023
Jalen Hood-Schifino	Big Ten All-Freshman Team	March 7, 2023
Jalen Hood-Schifino	USBWA All-District Team	March 14, 2023
Miller Kopp	Indiana's Big Ten Sportsmanship Award	March 7, 2023
Miller Kopp	Academic All-Big Ten	March 23, 2023
Anthony Leal	Academic All-Big Ten	March 23, 2023
Shaan Burke	Academic All-Big Ten	March 23, 2023
Nathan Childress	Academic All-Big Ten	March 23, 2023
Michael Shipp	Academic All-Big Ten	March 23, 2023

== NBA draftees ==
Year	Round	Pick	Name	Team
2023 NBA draft	1st	#17	Jalen Hood-Schifino	Los Angeles Lakers
2023 NBA draft	2nd	#57	Trayce Jackson-Davis	Golden State Warriors
