= Trey Galloway =

American basketball player (born 2001)

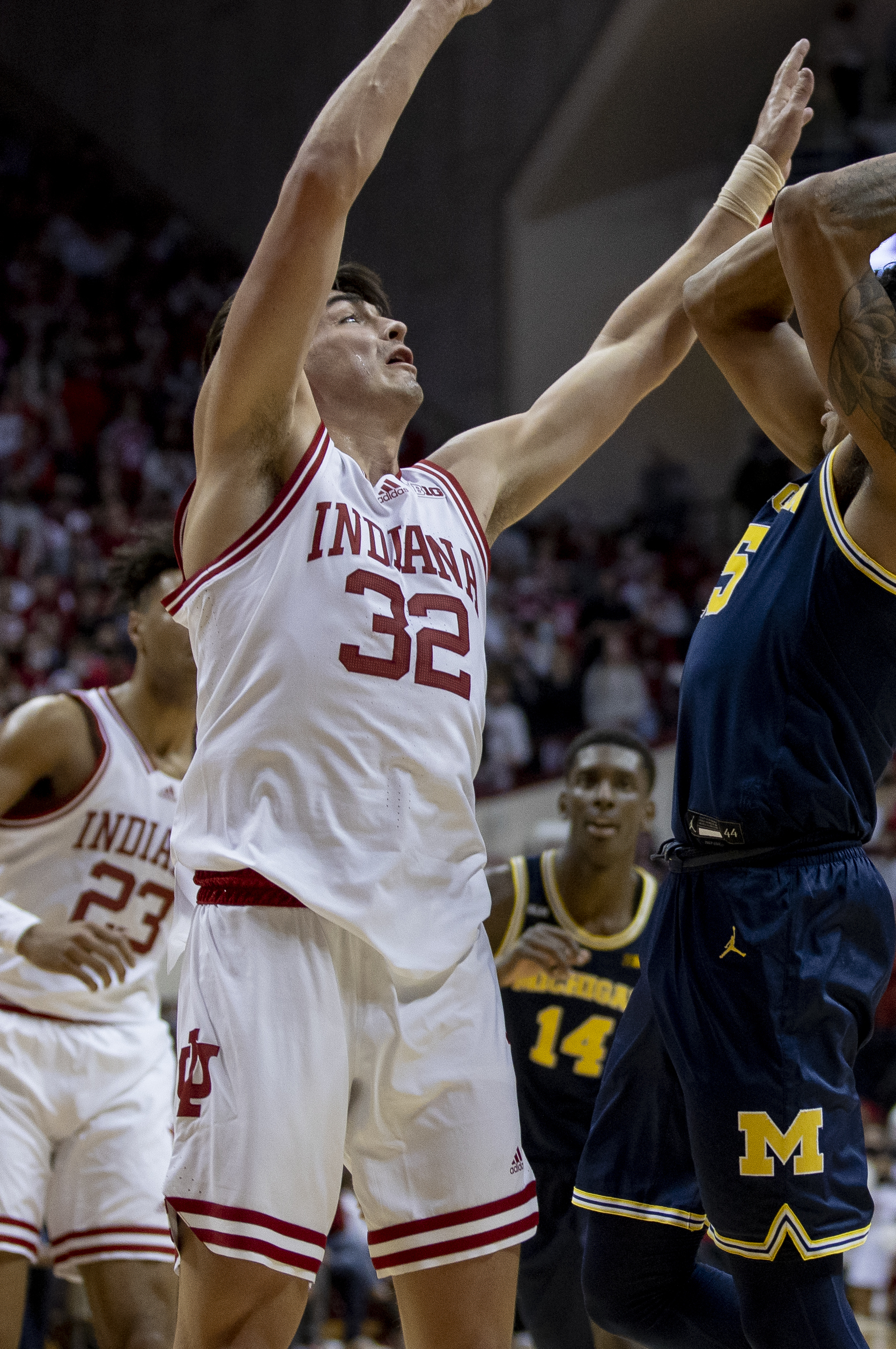
- Galloway in 2022

No. 25 – Santa Cruz Warriors
- Position: Shooting guard
- League: NBA G League

Personal information
- Born: November 28, 2001 (age 24) Carmel, Indiana, U.S.
- Listed height: 6 ft 4 in (1.93 m)
- Listed weight: 200 lb (91 kg)

Career information
- High school: Culver Academies (Culver, Indiana)
- College: Indiana (2020–2025)
- NBA draft: 2025: undrafted
- Playing career: 2025–present

Career history
- 2025–present: Santa Cruz Warriors

Trey Allen Galloway (born November 28, 2001) is an American professional basketball player for the Santa Cruz Warriors of the NBA G League. He played college basketball for the Indiana Hoosiers. He previously played for Culver Academies and was ranked as one of the Class of 2020's highest prospects in the state of Indiana (5th).

== High school career ==
Galloway attended Culver Academies and was coached by his father, Mark Galloway. As a freshman, Galloway averaged 10.2 points, 3.5 rebounds, and 2.3 assists. By the time he was a senior, his stats ballooned to 20.9 points, 5.5 rebounds, and 5.2 assists. Along the way, a sophomore Galloway helped lead his team to a Class 3A state championship title. The next season, Culver Academies made a return trip to the finals; however, the team was unable to repeat the accomplishment. During the off-seasons, Galloway played in the AAU circuit on team Indiana Elite. There he was able to build a relationship with future IU teammates, Anthony Leal and Khristian Lander.

=== Recruiting ===
Galloway was recruited in high school by numerous high-profile schools, including scholarship offers from in-state schools Indiana University, Purdue, Butler, Notre Dame and out-of-state, Big Ten schools Iowa, Michigan State, and Nebraska, among others. On July 26, 2019, Galloway announced his commitment to Indiana University.

College recruiting
Name	Hometown	School	Height	Weight	Commit date
Trey Galloway; SG	Culver, IN	Culver Academies	6 ft 4 in (1.93 m)	200 lb (91 kg)	Jul 26, 2019
Trey Galloway; SG	Recruit ratings: Rivals: 247Sports: ESPN: (80)				
Overall recruit ranking: Rivals: 143 247Sports: 146 ESPN: —
Note: In many cases, Scout, Rivals, 247Sports, On3, and ESPN may conflict in their listings of height and weight.; In these cases, the average was taken. ESPN grades are on a 100-point scale.; Sources: "Indiana 2020 Basketball Commitments". Rivals.; "2020 Indiana Hoosiers Recruiting Class". ESPN.; "2020 Team Ranking". Rivals.

== College career ==
As a freshman, Galloway averaged 3.6 points, 1.6 assists, and 1.9 rebounds per game. Galloway was hampered by injuries as a sophomore and averaged 5.5 points, 1.8 assists and 1.7 rebounds per game. As a junior he averaged 6.7 points, 3.0 rebounds, 2.1 assists, and 1.0 steals per game. Galloway averaged 10.6 points, 2.9 rebounds and 4.6 assists per game as a senior. As a fifth-year senior, he averaged 8.8 points, 4.7 assists and 2.3 rebounds per game.

== Professional career ==
For the 2025–26 season, Galloway was added to the roster of the Golden State Warriors' NBA G League affiliate, the Santa Cruz Warriors.

== Career statistics ==
Legend
GP	Games played	GS	Games started	MPG	Minutes per game
FG%	Field goal percentage	3P%	3-point field goal percentage	FT%	Free throw percentage
RPG	Rebounds per game	APG	Assists per game	SPG	Steals per game
BPG	Blocks per game	PPG	Points per game	**Bold**	Career high

=== College ===
Year	Team	GP	GS	MPG	FG%	3P%	FT%	RPG	APG	SPG	BPG	PPG
2020–21	Indiana	25	7	19.6	.417	.182	**.737**	1.9	1.6	.4	.0	3.6
2021–22	Indiana	20	3	20.8	.464	.214	.650	1.7	1.8	.9	**.3**	5.5
2022–23	Indiana	**32**	25	27.5	**.472**	**.462**	.644	**3.0**	2.1	.7	.1	6.7
2023–24	Indiana	31	**31**	**33.4**	.466	.260	.533	2.9	4.6	**1.2**	.2	**10.6**
2024-25	Indiana	**32**	20	27.9	.422	.327	.643	2.3	**4.7**	.6	.2	8.8
Career		140	86	26.6	.449	.310	.612	2.4	3.1	.8	.1	7.3

== Personal life ==
Galloway is the son of Mark and Dawn Galloway. His father is a former head basketball coach of Carmel High School and the current head basketball coach of Culver Academies. Galloway stated about his relationship with his dad/coach, “No, we’re not very good about leaving it in the gym. We should be, but we’re not. If I have a bad practice, or things go wrong at practice and he’s mad, it tends to last for a couple of hours a few times, and it can get a little heated." Galloway also has an older brother, Zachary, who has autism. Zachary is high-functioning, but Dawn had this to say about her sons, "Zachary’s not really able to show emotion a lot, so their relationship can be a little different. They were closer when Trey was little, but when he started playing basketball, it was hard for Zachary because he couldn’t play. But they love each other, and they’re always there for each other."
