= Mike Woodson =

American basketball player and coach (born 1958)

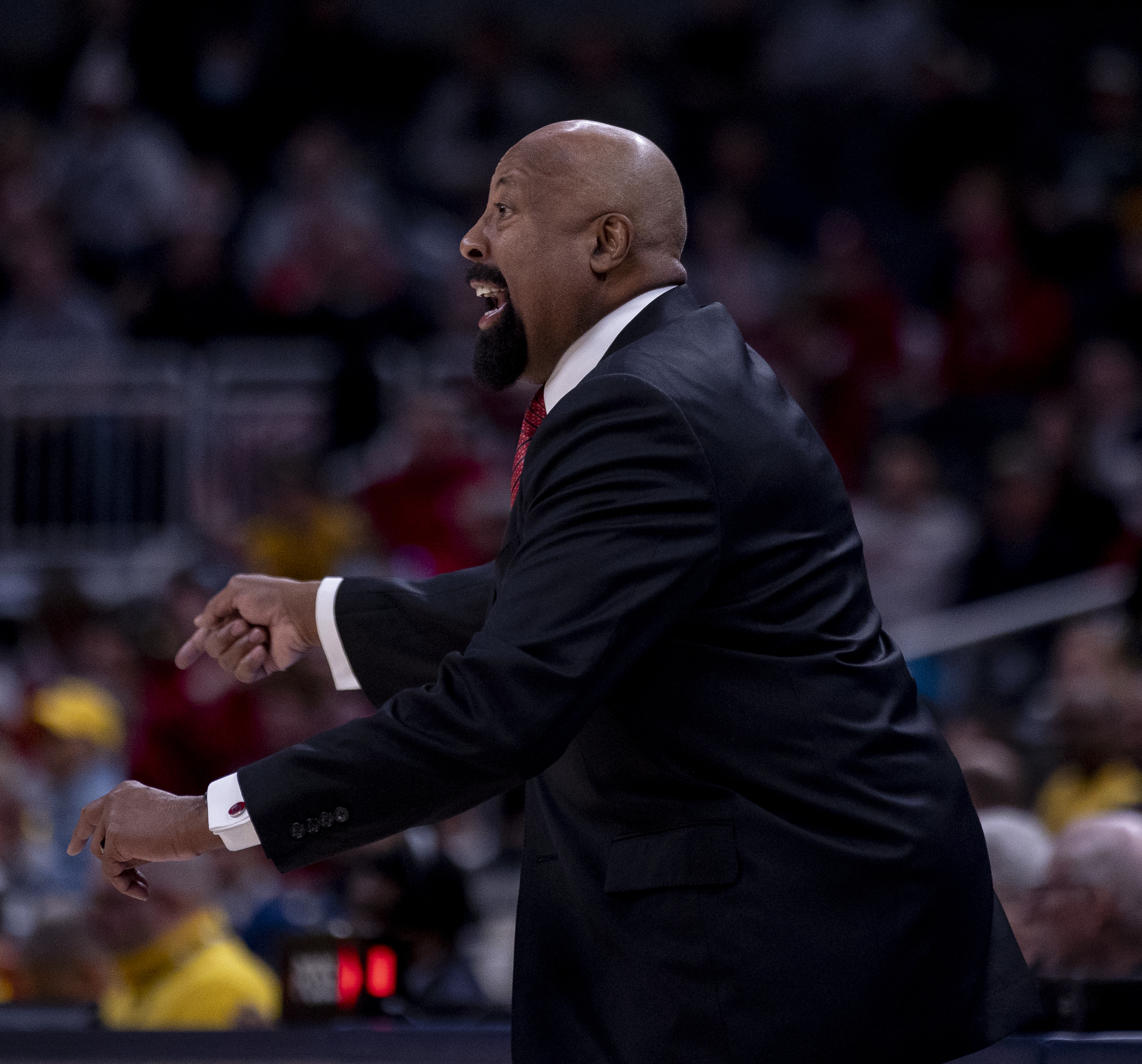
- Woodson coaching Indiana in 2022

Sacramento Kings
- Title: Associate head coach
- League: NBA

Personal information
- Born: March 24, 1958 (age 68) Indianapolis, Indiana, U.S.
- Listed height: 6 ft 5 in (1.96 m)
- Listed weight: 195 lb (88 kg)

Career information
- High school: Broad Ripple (Indianapolis, Indiana)
- College: Indiana (1976–1980)
- NBA draft: 1980: 1st round, 12th overall pick
- Drafted by: New York Knicks
- Playing career: 1980–1991
- Position: Shooting guard
- Number: 44, 42, 2
- Coaching career: 1996–present

Career history

Playing
- 1980–1981: New York Knicks
- 1982: New Jersey Nets
- 1982–1986: Kansas City / Sacramento Kings
- 1986–1988: Los Angeles Clippers
- 1988–1990: Houston Rockets
- 1990–1991: Cleveland Cavaliers

Career highlights
- As player: Second-team All-American – NABC (1980); Fourth-team All-American – NABC (1979); As assistant coach: NBA champion (2004)

Career NBA statistics
- Points: 10,981 (14.0 ppg)
- Rebounds: 1,838 (2.3 rpg)
- Assists: 1,822 (2.3 apg)
- Stats at NBA.com
- Stats at Basketball Reference
Medals
Representing United States
Men's basketball
Pan American Games
Gold medal – first place	1979 San Juan	Team competition

Michael Dean Woodson (born March 24, 1958) is an American professional basketball coach and former professional basketball player who is the associate head coach of the Sacramento Kings of the National Basketball Association (NBA).

With coach Bob Knight's Indiana Hoosiers, Woodson played collegiately from 1976 to 1980. As a junior team captain, his Hoosiers won the 1979 NIT Tournament and he was named to first team All-Big Ten. That summer Woodson won a gold medal as captain of the United States basketball team at the 1979 Pan American Games. His senior year, Woodson and Isiah Thomas led the 1979–80 Hoosiers to a conference title and a berth in the NCAA Tournament's Sweet Sixteen. Woodson was named the 1980 Big Ten Player of the Year, an NABC All-American, and awarded the Chicago Tribune Silver Basketball. Among Hoosier basketball players, Woodson ranks fifth all-time in total points and his 19.8 points per game average is tied (with Calbert Cheaney) for the second highest by a Hoosier who played four seasons in college.

Woodson played 11 seasons in the National Basketball Association (NBA) after getting drafted by the New York Knicks as the 12th pick of the 1980 NBA draft. He also played for the New Jersey Nets, Kansas City/Sacramento Kings, Los Angeles Clippers, Houston Rockets, and Cleveland Cavaliers. He appeared in 13 NBA playoff games over five post-seasons.

Woodson later coached for seven different NBA franchises. He worked as an assistant for the Milwaukee Bucks, Cleveland Cavaliers, Larry Brown's Philadelphia 76ers and Detroit Pistons, Los Angeles Clippers, and New York Knicks. Woodson and Brown, who had previously worked together as player and coach, won an NBA Championship with the Pistons during the 2003–04 season. Woodson went on to serve six years as head coach of the Atlanta Hawks, where he made the playoffs his last three seasons and his 206 career wins rank fourth-best in Hawks franchise history. He subsequently spent three seasons as head coach of the New York Knicks, where he reached the playoffs twice and secured an Atlantic Division title.

== Early life and prep career ==
Woodson was born in 1958 in Indianapolis as the second youngest of 12 children. Growing up his family struggled financially and his parents suffered from fragile health. The family moved several times, living in two- and three-bedroom homes for the 14-member family. Woodson's father, Chester, worked two or three jobs at a time—delivering pianos, managing laundromats, and mowing lawns. Chester died of a heart attack when Woodson was 13, with Woodson later remarking that his father "worked himself to death." After the death of Woodson's father, the family lived in separate homes to lessen the burden on Woodson's mother, Odessa, a nurse. Woodson lived for a year with his oldest sister before eventually moving back in with his mom to help support her, giving her half of each pay check.

Growing up in Indiana, Woodson felt the Hoosier hysteria that permeated the state helped prepare him for a career in basketball. He said, "Every yard had courts, little basketball hoops in the yard. If you didn't have it, you had neighbors two doors down that had it. You had parks in every area of town where you could go get a pickup game. Had rec centers where you could go play. It was a place to go learn your craft." He was also able to practice with a large number of talented basketball players in the Indianapolis area, including professionals such as George McGinnis, Roger Brown, and Rick Mount. According to Woodson, playing in Indiana meant "you had to be able to pass, and shoot, and dribble, and play without the basketball, you know, the motion offense. That was Indiana basketball. And Bob Knight is the one who really instilled a lot of the fundamentals and how high school coaches taught their teams."

== Indiana University playing career ==
Woodson elected to play college basketball for Bob Knight and the Indiana University Hoosiers. During one recruiting visit, Knight got into a heated exchange because Woodson's high school coach was not convinced Indiana would be the best fit for Woodson. However, according to Woodson, "I wanted to go somewhere where I could play, and where I knew I could get a great education, and my family didn't have to travel far to see me. So it was perfect. And I thought I was playing for the best coach in the country at that time."

In Woodson's freshman year, the 1976–77 season, the Hoosiers were coming off a 32–0 undefeated season. Reflecting on that year, Woodson remarked, "My freshman year I only weighed a buck-85 playing small forward, and I could never keep anybody off the boards, and Coach told me early on, I kept missing block outs, and Coach was like 'Dammit, you miss one more block out and you're gonna run them stairs until I get tired.' And sure enough I missed a block out. And there I go, I ran all the way to the top, and walk all the way down. And this was going on for about an hour and I was like 'did I come to IU for this?' So he (Knight) hollers up and says 'Well, I guess I've got to put up with your ass for another three years. Get on down here.'" In Woodson's sophomore year, the 1977–78 season, the Hoosiers finished the regular season with an overall record of 21–8 and a conference record of 12–6, finishing 2nd in the Big Ten Conference and advancing to the Sweet Sixteen in the 1978 NCAA Tournament.

In Woodson's junior year, the 1978–79 season, he served as captain of the Hoosier team. During the final game that season, against Illinois, word leaked out that Big Ten coaches had left Woodson off their all-conference first team, despite averaging 21 points and 5.7 rebounds while shooting 50 percent from the field. Woodson proceeded to lead Indiana to victory and score a career high 48 points (including 29 at the half). At the post-game press conference, Coach Knight criticized the media voters. "He just erupted," Woodson recalled. "He was like 'how the hell can this guy not be on first team All-Big Ten,' and then the next day they put me on first team All-Big Ten." The Hoosiers went on to win the 1979 NIT Tournament.

Following that season Woodson was selected to play for the United States in the 1979 Pan American Games on the basketball team coached by Indiana's Bob Knight. Behind Woodson's leadership as captain, the U.S. team compiled a 9–0 record and won the gold medal, while averaging 100.8 points a game—the first time that a United States team averaged more than 100 points-per-game in the Pan American Games. Following Woodson's team-leading 18.3 points per game, Coach Knight believed Woodson "was the best player in the country, and headed for a spectacular senior season."

The 1979–80 Hoosiers, led by Woodson and Isiah Thomas, began the season ranked No. 1 in the polls after a rare 78–50 blow-out of the Soviet Union men's national basketball team and then went on to four straight college victories. But Hoosier star Randy Wittman broke his foot and Woodson was forced to miss seven weeks due to back surgery on a herniated disc. Hobbled by these injuries, the team dropped to a 7–5 conference record, but upon Woodson's return on Valentine's Day with a win against Iowa, the Hoosiers went on a six-game winning streak and finished with a conference record of 13–5, finishing 1st in the Big Ten Conference. After winning the 1984 NBA All-Star MVP, Isiah Thomas was asked if that was his biggest basketball thrill, to which Thomas replied, "No, my biggest thrill was my freshman year at Indiana when Mike Woodson came back from back surgery and hit his first three jump shots at Iowa." The team advanced to the 1980 Sweet Sixteen and ended the season with an overall record of 21–8.

Woodson finished his career at Indiana with 1,279 points in conference games (11th all-time) and 2,061 points in all games. Despite playing just six conference games his senior year and missing seven weeks, Woodson was named the Big Ten's Most Valuable Player and an National Association of Basketball Coaches (NABC) All-American, and received the Chicago Tribune Silver Basketball award. Among Hoosier basketball players, Woodson ranks fifth all-time in total points and his 19.8 points per game average is tied (with Calbert Cheaney) for the second highest by a Hoosier who played four seasons in college.

== NBA professional career ==
The New York Knicks selected Woodson 12th overall in the 1980 NBA draft. He played in the league from 1980 until 1991, averaging 14.0 points over 786 games. After a season with the Knicks (1980–81), Woodson played for the New Jersey Nets (1981–82) in just seven games before being traded to the Kansas City/Sacramento Kings (1981–82 through 1985–86). There, Woodson alternated between starter and sixth man in five seasons with the Kings, averaging a career-high 18.2 points per game in 1982–83, including a 1983 playoff run. Kings assistant coach Frank Hanblen later reflected on Woodson: "Great guy, great teammate, gave you everything he had." In August 1986, Woodson was traded to the Los Angeles Clippers, the same month his mother Odessa Woodson died. He stayed with the Clippers in the 1986–87 and 1987–88 seasons, and then played with the Houston Rockets (1988–89 through 1990–91) and Cleveland Cavaliers (1990–91).

Woodson's coaches and mentors during his NBA career included Red Holzman (Knicks), Larry Brown (Nets), Cotton Fitzsimmons (Kings), Gene Shue (Clippers), and Don Chaney (Clippers and Rockets).

== NBA coaching career ==
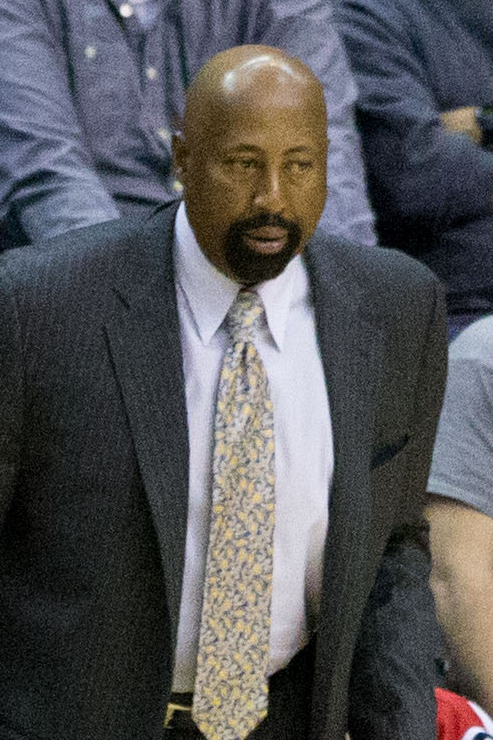
Woodson as Knicks head coach in 2013

=== Assistant coaching ===
Prior to his six years as head coach of the Atlanta Hawks, Woodson was an assistant coach with Chris Ford's Milwaukee Bucks (1996–97 through 1998–99), Cleveland Cavaliers (1999–2000 through 2000–01), and Larry Brown's Philadelphia 76ers (2001–02 through 2002–03) and Detroit Pistons (2003–04). He won an NBA Championship with the Pistons during the 2003–04 season.

After two stints as head coach, with the Hawks and Knicks, Woodson once again served as an assistant. On September 29, 2014, the Los Angeles Clippers officially announced that Woodson had been hired as an assistant coach under Doc Rivers and he would hold that position with the Clippers throughout the next four years, missing out on the playoffs in only his last season there. Woodson would later announce his resignation from the Clippers on May 15, 2018. On September 4, 2020, Woodson was hired as an assistant coach for the New York Knicks under head coach Tom Thibodeau, but he left that position to serve as head coach of the Indiana Hoosiers.

=== Atlanta Hawks (2004–2010) ===
Woodson replaced Terry Stotts to became a head coach of the Atlanta Hawks during the 2004–05 season. This first season the Hawks struggled mightily, compiling a 13–69 (.159) record with rookies Josh Smith and Josh Childress. The following two seasons, 2005–06 and 2006–07, Woodson's Hawks improved to 26–56 (.317) and 30–52 (.366), respectively.

In the 2007–08 season, Woodson's team finished third in the Southeast Division with a 37–45 record and made the playoffs for the first time since 1999. In the first round of the playoffs, they lost to the top-seeded Boston Celtics in seven games. It marked the first of three consecutive playoff appearances for Woodson and the Hawks. In the 2008–09 season, the Hawks went 47–35 (.573), defeating the Miami Heat in the first round playoffs before advancing and losing to Cleveland in the conference semifinals. In the 2009–10 season, the Hawks went 53–29 (.646) and beat Milwaukee in the first round playoffs before falling to Orlando 0–4 in the second round. After the loss, general manager Rick Sund announced that the team would not attempt to re-sign Woodson, whose contract expired on May 17, 2010.

With the Hawks, Woodson compiled an overall playoff record of 11–18 (.379). Woodson had 206 career wins, the fourth-best in Hawks history after Richie Guerin (327), Mike Fratello (324), and Lenny Wilkens (310). He was an integral mentor to Hawk all-stars such as Joe Johnson, Al Horford, and Jeff Teague.

=== New York Knicks (2011–2014) ===
On August 29, 2011, the New York Knicks announced that Mike Woodson was hired as an assistant coach under head coach Mike D'Antoni. On March 14, 2012, Woodson was named interim head coach after D'Antoni's resignation. In his debut as interim head coach, the Knicks defeated the Portland Trail Blazers 121–79. Under Woodson, the 2011–12 Knicks finished 18–6 during the regular season and clinched a playoff spot for the second straight year, this time as the seventh seed, making it the first clinched consecutive playoff berth since making 14 straight playoff appearances from 1988 to 2001. The team's 36–30 record was the highest winning percentage for the team since the 2000–01 season. The Knicks proceeded to the playoffs but, due in part to injuries to Jeremy Lin, Baron Davis, and Iman Shumpert, the team fell to the Heat in the playoffs. Nevertheless, the Knicks removed Woodson's interim status and he was officially named the full-time head coach on May 25, 2012.

Woodson's 2012–13 Knicks compiled an 18–5 record to start the season, their best start since 1993. In their first four games, they scored at least 100 points and won by double digits in all games. By the All-Star break in mid-February 2013, the Knicks compiled a 32–18 record, placing them second in the Eastern Conference. On April 9, the Knicks secured the Atlantic Division title for the first time since the 1993–94 NBA season. The team finished the season 54–28 and set the NBA single-season record for three-pointers. On May 3, the Knicks defeated the Boston Celtics in the first round of the NBA playoffs, 4–2, their first playoff victory since 2000, but were subsequently eliminated in the second round of the playoffs, losing the series to the Indiana Pacers 4–2.

Woodson's 2013–14 Knicks Knicks struggled with a 3–13 start and the team never fully recovered, finishing with a record of 37–45 and missing the playoffs for the first time in four seasons. On April 21, 2014, Woodson was fired from the New York Knicks head coaching position along with his entire coaching staff. Woodson finished his tenure as New York's coach with a total record of 109–79 (.680). He was a coach and mentor to Knick players such as Carmelo Anthony and Amar'e Stoudemire.

=== Sacramento Kings (2025–present) ===
On May 7, 2025, Woodson was reportedly hired as the associate head coach of the Sacramento Kings by Kings coach Doug Christie. He was officially hired five days later on May 12.

== Indiana Hoosiers coaching career ==
On March 28, 2021, Woodson was hired as head coach of the Indiana Hoosiers men's basketball team. His contract provided him with roughly $3 million per year over six years, including $550,000 per year in base salary and $2.45 million annually in outside, marketing, and promotional income. Additionally, Woodson's contract provides bonuses of $100,000 for finishing in the top three in the Big Ten standings, as well as another $100,000 for an APR score above 950.

In his first year as head coach, Woodson led the 2021–22 team to a 21–14 record, including a 9–11 record in Big Ten Conference play. Woodson and the Hoosiers snapped nine-game losing streaks against Purdue and Michigan and advanced to the semifinals of the 2022 Big Ten men's basketball tournament, their first appearance since 2013. Indiana was selected to play in a 2022 NCAA Division I men's basketball tournament First Four game, which they won, before losing in the first round. It marked their first NCAA tournament appearance since 2016. In Woodson's second season, Indiana again qualified for the NCAA tournament, marking the first back-to-back tournament appearances for Indiana since the 2015 and 2016 tournaments.

During the 2022–23 season, despite missing starting point guard Xavier Johnson for most of the season, Woodon's Hoosiers finished 23–12 overall, ranked in the top 25 in both major polls, and finished tied for second in the Big Ten with a 12–8 mark. The team led the Big Ten in field goal percentage (48.7%), finished second in the conference in field goal percentage defense, tied for the most wins in the Big Ten against Top 25 programs (5), and had the best winning percentage versus ranked foes (62.5%) in the conference. Woodson's team was propelled in large part because of Woodson's development of future NBA players Trayce Jackson-Davis (consensus first-team All-American) and Jalen Hood-Schifino (Big Ten Freshman of the Year).

On February 7, 2025, Indiana announced that Woodson would step down as head coach at the end of the 2024–25 season.

== Coaching philosophy ==
Woodson played and assisted under well-known coaches such as Bob Knight, Red Holzman, Cotton Fitzsimmons, and Larry Brown. Much of his coaching philosophy reflects these mentors, emphasizing hustle, accountability, and shared responsibility. In games, Woodson "exudes Knight's steely discipline," but in language uses Larry Brown's "philosopher-coach persona, speaking earnestly of 'playing the right way' and the need to 'teach' his players." On the court he tends to favor the "share-the-ball mentality preached by Holzman."

Despite playing and learning under well-known, traditional basketball coaches, Woodson embraced "a modern style of play" at Indiana. He implemented "a four-out one-in offensive system that highlights versatile athletes in a free-flowing system" and "made a point to emphasize that he understood the importance of 3-pointers." Woodson also utilizes analytics to help determine player combinations.

Larry Brown, who hired Woodson in Philadelphia (2001–03) and again in Detroit (2003–04, when the Pistons won the NBA championship), noted Woodson is "just a really good, decent guy who respects the game and is loyal as hell and loves to coach and teach."

== Personal life ==
Woodson and his wife, Terri, have two daughters, Alexis and Mariah, who both played collegiate volleyball. Woodson avoids e-mail and text messages, preferring a live voice to a keyboard.

== Career playing statistics ==
Legend
GP	Games played	GS	Games started	MPG	Minutes per game
FG%	Field goal percentage	3P%	3-point field goal percentage	FT%	Free throw percentage
RPG	Rebounds per game	APG	Assists per game	SPG	Steals per game
BPG	Blocks per game	PPG	Points per game	**Bold**	Career high

=== NBA ===
==== Regular season ====
Year	Team	GP	GS	MPG	FG%	3P%	FT%	RPG	APG	SPG	BPG	PPG
1980–81	New York	81		11.7	.442	.200	.766	1.2	.9	.4	.1	4.7
1981–82	New Jersey	7	0	20.7	.441	.000	.719	1.9	2.3	1.0	.3	11.9
1981–82	Kansas City	76	74	28.8	**.507**	.292	.780	**3.1**	2.7	**1.8**	.4	16.1
1982–83	Kansas City	**81**	3	30.0	.506	.212	.790	**3.1**	3.1	1.7	**.7**	**18.2**
1983–84	Kansas City	71	12	25.9	.477	.250	.818	2.5	2.5	1.2	.4	14.5
1984–85	Kansas City	78	3	25.6	.496	.238	.800	2.5	1.8	1.5	.4	17.0
1985–86	Sacramento	**81**	51	29.8	.475	.154	.837	2.8	2.4	1.1	.5	15.6
1986–87	L.A. Clippers	74	66	28.7	.437	.276	.828	2.2	2.6	1.4	.2	17.1
1987–88	L.A. Clippers	80	77	31.7	.445	.231	.868	2.4	**3.4**	1.4	.3	18.0
1988–89	Houston	**81**	**79**	27.9	.438	**.348**	.823	2.4	2.5	1.1	.2	12.9
1989–90	Houston	61	11	15.9	.395	.293	.721	1.4	1.1	.7	.2	6.5
1990–91	Houston	11	3	11.4	.389	.167	.833	1.0	.9	.5	.4	4.8
1990–91	Cleveland	4	0	11.5	.217	.000	**1.000**	.5	1.3	.0	.3	2.8
Career		786	379	25.5	.466	.271	.813	2.3	2.3	1.2	.3	14.0

==== Playoffs ====
Year	Team	GP	GS	MPG	FG%	3P%	FT%	RPG	APG	SPG	BPG	PPG
1981	New York	2		4.0	.333	–	**1.000**	1.0	.0	.0	.0	2.0
1984	Kansas City	3		29.0	.409	.000	.867	2.7	3.0	.7	.0	16.3
1986	Sacramento	3	3	**36.7**	**.449**	.000	**1.000**	**3.7**	1.7	**1.3**	**.7**	**18.7**
1989	Houston	**4**	**4**	34.3	.347	**.333**	.833	2.3	**4.5**	1.0	.5	11.8
1990	Houston	1	0	6.0	.333	.000	–	.0	2.0	.0	.0	2.0
Career		13	7	26.8	.399	.231	.902	2.3	2.6	.8	.3	12.2

== Head coaching record ==
=== College ===
Record table
Season	Team	Overall	Conference	Standing	Postseason
Indiana Hoosiers (Big Ten Conference) (2021–2025)
2021–22	Indiana	21–14	9–11	9th	NCAA Division I Round of 64
2022–23	Indiana	23–12	12–8	T–2nd	NCAA Division I Round of 32
2023–24	Indiana	19–14	10–10	T–6th	
2024–25	Indiana	19–13	10–10	9th	
Indiana:		82–53 (.607)	41–39 (.513)		
Total:		82–53 (.607)			

=== NBA ===
Legend
Regular season	G	Games coached	W	Games won	L	Games lost	W–L %	Win–loss %
Playoffs	PG	Playoff games	PW	Playoff wins	PL	Playoff losses	PW–L %	Playoff win–loss %

Team	Year	G	W	L	W–L%	Finish	PG	PW	PL	PW–L%	Result
Atlanta	2004–05	82	13	69	.159	5th in Southeast	—	—	—	—	Missed Playoffs
Atlanta	2005–06	82	26	56	.317	5th in Southeast	—	—	—	—	Missed Playoffs
Atlanta	2006–07	82	30	52	.366	5th in Southeast	—	—	—	—	Missed Playoffs
Atlanta	2007–08	82	37	45	.451	3rd in Southeast	7	3	4	.429	Lost in first round
Atlanta	2008–09	82	47	35	.580	2nd in Southeast	11	4	7	.364	Lost in Conf. semifinals
Atlanta	2009–10	82	53	29	.646	2nd in Southeast	11	4	7	.364	Lost in Conf. semifinals
New York	2011–12	24	18	6	.750	2nd in Atlantic	5	1	4	.200	Lost in first round
New York	2012–13	82	54	28	.659	1st in Atlantic	12	6	6	.500	Lost in Conf. semifinals
New York	2013–14	82	37	45	.451	3rd in Atlantic	—	—	—	—	Missed Playoffs
Career		680	315	365	.463		46	18	28	.391	
