= Fletcher Loyer =

American basketball player (born 2003)

No. 26 – San Diego Clippers
- Position: Shooting guard
- League: NBA G League

Personal information
- Born: September 1, 2003 (age 23) Portland, Oregon, U.S.
- Listed height: 6 ft 4 in (1.93 m)
- Listed weight: 180 lb (82 kg)

Career information
- High school: Clarkston (Clarkston, Michigan); Homestead (Fort Wayne, Indiana)
- College: Purdue (2022–2026)
- NBA draft: 2026: undrafted
- Playing career: 2026–present

Career history
- 2026–present: San Diego Clippers
- Stats at NBA.com
- Stats at Basketball Reference

Fletcher Joseph Loyer (born September 1, 2003) is an American basketball player for the San Diego Clippers of the NBA G League. He played college basketball for the Purdue Boilermakers, where he is the school's all-time leader in made three-point shots. During his time as the starting shooting guard at Purdue, the team won two conference regular season championships, two conference tournament championships, and were national runner-ups in his sophomore season.

Loyer was a 3× All-Big Ten honorable mention, led the Big Ten in 3-point field goal percentage as a junior, and was second as a senior. As a sophomore, he had a higher percentage than the leader, but did not meet the qualifying threshold. Loyer is the son of basketball coach and scout John Loyer and brother of Foster Loyer, the 2018 Mr. Basketball of Michigan.

Loyer played high school basketball in Michigan at Clarkston High School for his freshman and sophomore seasons. Then, he attended Homestead High School in Indiana for his junior and senior seasons. As a senior, he was the 2022 Indiana Gatorade Player of the Year award winner and the 2022 Indiana Mr. Basketball runner-up.

== Early life and high school career ==
Loyer was born September 1, 2003, to John and Kate Loyer. His father played basketball at the University of Akron. His mother played volleyball at Indiana University, and she was an assistant coach for Purdue University volleyball. His grandfather, Al McFarland, played for Purdue Boilermakers men's basketball in 1964. The Loyer family moved for John's National Basketball Association career with the Portland Trail Blazers, Philadelphia 76ers, New Jersey Nets and Detroit Pistons. Loyer was an assistant coach for the Portland (2003–05), Philadelphia (2005–09) and New Jersey (2009–11) before taking on the same role with Detroit in 2011. He served as Pistons interim head coach for 32 games for the 2013–14 Pistons. He later joined the Los Angeles Clippers as a scout in 2016.

=== Clarkston years (2018–2020) ===
Loyer initially attended Clarkston High School in Clarkston, Michigan. As a freshman he was a 2019 Detroit Free Press Michigan High School Athletic Association (MHSAA) Division I all-state honorable mention selection. Loyer averaged 22 points, 3.5 rebounds, and 3.1 assists per game during his sophomore season. He was a 2020 The Detroit News MHSAA Division I all-state first team selection. Clarkston was 21–1 with a 20-game winning streak when COVID-19 pandemic lockdowns shutdown the season. By May 2020, he had scholarship offers from Toledo, Detroit Mercy and Denver. On May 30, 2020, he received his first high major offer from Michigan. By July 1, he also had offers from Purdue and Nebraska.

=== Homestead years (2020–2022) ===
Loyer's mother, Kate, is from Indiana (she had been a student-athlete at McCutcheon High School). Loyer had relatives in the Fort Wayne area, including many cousins and an aunt who was a volleyball coach at Concordia Lutheran High School. His family moved to Fort Wayne, Indiana after his sophomore year and by July 3, 2020, he enrolled at Homestead High School, At Homestead, which had won the 2015 Indiana Class 4A state championship, he would join a team with class of 2021 Illinois Fighting Illini men's basketball recruit, shooting guard Luke Goode. Loyer switched from shooting guard to point guard when he moved. On November 23, 2020, Loyer committed to Purdue over a field of offers that included Michigan, Missouri, Nebraska, Notre Dame and Utah. At the time, he was rated a three-star recruit and ranked 140th in the National class of 2022. He was later rated a four-star recruit. On December 29, 2020, Loyer posted a Homestead High School single-game scoring record with 50 points against Marion High School. After winning their first 25 games, top-ranked Homestead lost 60–49 in the regional semifinals to Carmel High School, the number 2 ranked team in the state, on March 13, 2021. Loyer had a game high 26 points. He averaged 24.4 points, 4.5 assists, and 4.9 rebounds per game during his junior season.

Although Loyer's Homestead team in Indiana was upset in March, he was able to play a full season during his junior year. In Michigan, almost the whole season was lost. Indoor winter sports were suspended on November 18, 2020. Indoor contact winter high school sports' (basketball, wrestling, hockey, and competitive cheer) season were suspended until at least February 21, 2021, due to the pandemic.

On March 12, 2022, future Purdue teammate Braden Smith led his Westfield High School team to a 64–53 victory over Loyer and Homestead in the Indiana state Class 4A Regional matchup. Although Loyer posted 27 points and surpassed former Boilermaker, Caleb Swanigan for the school's single-season scoring record (726 points versus 702 points), it was not enough to overcome Smith's 13-point, 8-rebound, 6-assist, 3-steal, and 2-block effort. On March 16, Loyer was named the Indiana boys' basketball Gatorade Player of the Year as a senior after averaging 26.9 points, 5.3 rebounds, and 3.6 assists per game. After totalling 803 points in two season in Michigan, he totaled 1360 points in his two years at Homestead to finish with 2,163 points in his high school career. On March 29, Loyer won the national 3-point contest as part of the 2022 High School Slam Dunk and 3-Point Championships over Kyle Filipowski and Austin Montgomery. On April 2, Loyer was runner up for Indiana Mr. Basketball to Smith by a 128–109 vote. On April 4, he was one of 14 players selected to the 2022 Indiana All-Stars boys team, but declined the award.

== College career ==
=== Freshman season ===
Loyer entered his freshman season at Purdue as a starter at guard. On November 28, 2022, Loyer was recognized as the Big Ten Freshman of the Week for averaging 12.3 points, 2.0 assists and 1.7 rebounds in three victories, including two over a pair of top-ten ranked opponents (14 points against No. 6 Gonzaga and 18 against No. 8/10 Duke), during Purdue's 2022 Phil Knight Invitational title run. The following day, CBSSports.com recognized Loyer as the first CBS Sports/USBWA National Freshman of the Week of the season. On December 5, he was named Big Ten Freshman of the Week when he averaged 15.5 points and 6.0 assists with no turnovers in another pair of wins. His career-high 20 points and eight rebounds against Minnesota was the first 20/8 performance by a Purdue freshman since Bruce Parkinson on March 10, 1973. When Purdue faced his brother's Davidson team on December 17, they won 69–61, and Fletcher outscored his brother 14–11. On January 5, he posted 11 second half points, including the game-winning go-ahead three point shot with 11 seconds remaining against Ohio State in Columbus, Ohio.

On January 17, 2023, Loyer was recognized as both a Co-Big Ten Player of the Week and the Big Ten Freshman of the Week after he scored 27 points and established a Purdue Boilermaker freshman single-game three point shots made record with 6 with against Nebraska on January 13. Purdue won the 2022–23 Big Ten Conference men's basketball regular season championship (the school's 25th) as well as the 2023 Big Ten men's basketball tournament. Following the regular season, Loyer was selected by both the coaches and the media as an honorable mention All-Big ten selection. #1-seeded Purdue lost to 23.5 point underdog #16-seeded Fairleigh Dickinson in its 2023 NCAA Division I men's basketball tournament first-round game in Columbus, the biggest upset in tournament history. Loyer, who scored Purdue's final 8 points, and who was part of a freshman backcourt (with Smith) that had 10 turnovers, missed a game-tying three point shot with 12.3 seconds left when he was pinned in the corner. The freshman backcourt pair of Smith and Loyer each started a school freshman record 35 games and finished the season as Purdue's 2nd highest scoring freshman duo (Loyer 384/Smith 340, 724 total) behind Robbie Hummel and E'Twaun Moore (813, 2008).

=== Sophomore season ===
On November 21, against #7-ranked Tennessee in the 2023 Maui Invitational semifinal, Loyer tied his career-high with 27 points and added a career best 6 rebounds. He also scored 27 in a 92–84 victory on December 16 against previously unbeaten #1-rated Arizona. Purdue clinched a second consecutive Big Ten regular season Championship with a March 2 victory over Michigan State as Loyer contributed 15 points. On Senior day on March 10, Loyer contributed 15 points with a perfect shooting night making all 5 shots from the field (including 2 three-point shots) and all three from the line to help Purdue finish with a 16–0 home record for the year by defeating Wisconsin 78–70. He earned honorable mention All-Big Ten recognition by both the coaches and the media again as a sophomore. Loyer helped Purdue seal a 2024 NCAA Division I men's basketball tournament Sweet Sixteen appearance with 15 points and a season-high 6 assists against Utah State on March 24. In the March 29 Sweet Sixteen round against Gonzaga, when he tallied 10 points, Loyer brought his March three-point shooting percentage to 68.2% (15/22). Loyer contributed 14 points in the Elite Eight regional championship round against Tennessee and 11 (3–5 on three-point shots) in the final four round against NC State to help Purdue reach the national championship game. While Boo Buie led the Big Ten conference in 3-point field goal percentage with 43.4% (minimum 2.5 made per game), Loyer tallied 44.4% but failed to achieve the minimum threshold.

=== Junior season ===
Of Loyer's 4 20-point performances on the season, his season high was 24 points on the road versus Minnesota on January 2. On March 4, Loyer made a career-high seven three-point shots against Rutgers on a 23-point scoring night. The 2024–25 Big Ten Conference men's basketball season, which followed the expansion of the Big Ten with 4 Pac-12 Conference teams (Oregon, UCLA, USC, and Washington), the minimum threshold was reduced to 2 made three point shots per game. Loyer led the Big Ten conference in 3-point shooting percentage in all games (44.4%) and conference games (46.5%). Following the season, he earned All-Big Ten honorable mention recognition.

=== Senior season ===
He was a 2025 preseason Julius Erving Award watchlist selectee. In the November 4 season opening night, Loyer posted a career-high 30 points against Evansville. On November 28, Loyer scored 15 points on a perfect shooting night (all four three-point shots and all three free throws) to help No. 1 Purdue defeat Eastern Illinois 109–62. When the No.4 ranked 2025–26 Boilermakers lost 3 games in a row at the end of January to UCLA, Illinois and Indiana, Loyer helped the No. 12 ranked team rebound by posting 29 points on February 1 against Maryland including 21 in the first half to help build a 25-point haftime lead. In Purdue's next game on February 7, Loyer posted 18 points, highlighted by a go-ahead three point shot with 50.3 seconds remaining and 3-of-4 subsequent free throws to seal a 68–64 victory over Oregon. In the rivalry game rematch against Indiana on February 20, Loyer had 18 points on a perfect shooting night in which he made all 5 shots from the field (4 three point shots) and all 4 from the line to help the team earn a 93–64 victory. On his March 7 senior day against #15 ranked Wisconsin Loyer scored 23 points including a 6–for–9 three point performance. The effort was historic on many fronts. Loyer surpassed Carsen Edwards (281) for Purdue's career three point shots record with his 282nd. On the same night he passed David Teague (146) with his 148th three point shot made at Mackey Arena. Additionally, he and Smith tied the school record for games played by Dakota Mathias (141). After losing 4 of its 6 final regular season games, Purdue won 4 in 4 days to capture the 2026 Big Ten men's basketball tournament with a victory over Michigan on March 15. Loyer contributed 14 points. In a second round 2026 NCAA Division I men's basketball tournament 79–69 victory against #25 ranked Miami Loyer posted 24 points on an efficient shooting night (4–4 threes, 8–8 free throws and 6–7 from the field).

Loyer finished his Purdue career with 1,829 points (11th in Purdue career scoring) and 309 career 3-pointers (school record). His 112 senior season 3-pointers was the second highest single-season total in school history. His senior class with Smith and Trey Kaufman-Renn finished with a school record four-season win total of 117 (Only surpassed in Big Ten history by 2013 Ohio State - 123; 2014 Ohio State - 119). The 2025-26 Big Ten Men's Basketball included the historical accomplishments of the 2024 conference realignment schools that joined the Big Ten (Oregon, UCLA, USC, and Washington). Thus, Loyer's career 309 3-pointers was short of the 317 required for the top 10 in Big Ten history (including Tajuan Porter, 345; Bryce Alford, 329; Jason Kapono, 317). However, the last record book before the conference realignment, (the 2023-24 Big Ten Men's Basketball Media Guide) with records through the 2022–23 Big Ten Conference men's basketball season included Trent Frazier (9th, 310) and Joe Crispin (10th, 308). Sources that still use the 2.5 made three point shots per game threshold for the Big Ten Conference list Loyer as the leading 3 point field goal percentage shooter for the season (43.2%). However, Tyler Bilodeau (46.4%) was the Big Ten leader followed by Loyer given the reduced threshold.

Loyer was not one of the 73 players invited to the NBA draft combine, but he received a G League Elite Camp Invitation making him eligible to compete for a combine slot.

== Professional career ==
After going undrafted in the 2026 NBA draft, Loyer signed an Exhibit 10 contract with the Los Angeles Clippers for whom he would play in the 2026 NBA Summer League. In September, Loyer signed with the team for a training camp deal. He was waived by the team on October 6, but they retained his G League rights. Although he was not on the team's roster for its October 10, preseason contest, he re-signed with the team on October 13. He played for the Clippers in their October 14, preseason contest against the Denver Nuggets, tallying 3 points, a rebound and an assist in 7 minutes. He was waived again by the team to make way on the roster for Miye Oni on October 15 with acknowledgement that Loyer would likely be invited to play for the team's G-League affiliate. He was listed on the San Diego Clippers training camp roster. In his November 6, G League debut, he posted 22 points on 5–9 three point shooting.

== Career statistics ==
Legend
GP	Games played	GS	Games started	MPG	Minutes per game
FG%	Field goal percentage	3P%	3-point field goal percentage	FT%	Free throw percentage
RPG	Rebounds per game	APG	Assists per game	SPG	Steals per game
BPG	Blocks per game	PPG	Points per game	**Bold**	Career high

=== College ===
*	Led Big Ten Conference

Year	Team	GP	GS	MPG	FG%	3P%	FT%	RPG	APG	SPG	BPG	PPG
2022–23	Purdue	35	35	28.9	.367	.326	.794	1.7	**2.4**	.6	**.1**	11.0
2023–24	Purdue	**39**	**39**	27.8	.416	**.444**	**.861**	2.1	1.9	**.8**	.0	10.3
2024–25	Purdue	36	36	**30.9**	**.465**	**.444***	.848	2.1	1.8	.5	.0	13.8
2025–26	Purdue	**39**	**39**	29.3	.450	.432	**.874**	**2.3**	2.1	.7	**.1**	**14.1**
Career		149	149	29.2	.425	.411	.846	2.1	2.0	.6	.0	12.3

== Personal life ==
Loyer's older brother, Foster, was Mr. Basketball of Michigan and played at Davidson after beginning his career at Michigan State. The Loyer family also has a daughter, Jersey, Fletcher's sister. Jersey entered as a 2024 freshman Division I volleyball player at Butler University.
