= 2022–23 Penn State Nittany Lions basketball team =

American men's collegiate basketball season

2022–23 Penn State Nittany Lions basketball

NCAA tournament, Second Round
- Conference: Big Ten Conference
- Record: 23–14 (10–10 Big Ten)
- Head coach: Micah Shrewsberry (2nd season)
- Assistant coaches: Adam Fisher; Aki Collins; Mike Farrelly
- Home arena: Bryce Jordan Center

2022–23 Big Ten Conference men's basketball standings
	Conf.				Overall
Team	W		L	PCT	W		L	PCT
No. 3 Purdue †	15	–	5	.750	29	–	6	.829
No. 21 Indiana	12	–	8	.600	23	–	12	.657
Northwestern	12	–	8	.600	22	–	12	.647
Michigan State	11	–	8	.579	21	–	13	.618
Maryland	11	–	9	.550	22	–	13	.629
Illinois	11	–	9	.550	20	–	13	.606
Iowa	11	–	9	.550	19	–	14	.576
Michigan	11	–	9	.550	18	–	16	.529
Penn State	10	–	10	.500	23	–	14	.622
Rutgers	10	–	10	.500	19	–	15	.559
Wisconsin	9	–	11	.450	20	–	15	.571
Nebraska	9	–	11	.450	16	–	16	.500
Ohio State	5	–	15	.250	16	–	19	.457
Minnesota	2	–	17	.105	9	–	22	.290
† Conference tournament winner Rankings from AP poll

The 2022–23 Penn State Nittany Lions basketball team represented Pennsylvania State University in the 2022–23 NCAA Division I men's basketball season. They were led by second-year head coach Micah Shrewsberry and played their home games at the Bryce Jordan Center in University Park, Pennsylvania as members of the Big Ten Conference. They finished the season 23–13, 10–10 in Big Ten play to finish in a tie for ninth place. They defeated Illinois, Northwestern, and Indiana to advance to the championship game of the Big Ten tournament. There they lost to Purdue. They received an at-large bid to the NCAA tournament for the first time since 2011 as the No. 10 seed in the Midwest region. They defeated Texas A&M in the first round of the tournament, marking their first tournament win since 2001, before losing to Texas in the second round.

On March 22, 2023, Micah Shrewsberry left the school to take the head coaching job at Notre Dame. On March 29, the school named VCU head coach Mike Rhoades the team's new head coach.

== Previous season ==
The Nittany Lions finished the 2021–22 season 14–17, 7–13 in Big Ten play to finish in a three-way tie for 10th place. As the No. 11 seed in the Big Ten tournament, they defeated Minnesota and Ohio State before losing to Purdue in the quarterfinals.

== Offseason ==
=== Departures ===
Name	Num	Pos.	Height	Weight	Year	Hometown	Reason for departure
Irekefe Oweh	0	G	6'2"	188	Sophomore	North Brunswick, NJ	Walk-on; transferred
Sam Sessoms	3	G	6'0"	189	Senior	Philadelphia, PA	Graduate transferred to Coppin State
Greg Lee	5	F	6'9"	217	GS Senior	Rockford, IL	Graduated
Jaheam Cornwall	11	G	6'0"	190	GS Senior	Brooklyn, NY	Graduated
Jevonnie Scott	13	F	6'7"	252	Junior	Toronto, ON	Transferred to Brock
Jalanni White	14	F	6'8"	205	GS Senior	New Haven, CT	Graduated
John Harrar	21	F	6'9"	240	GS Senior	Wallingford, PA	Graduated

=== Incoming transfers ===
Name	Number	Pos.	Height	Weight	Year	Hometown	Previous college
Andrew Funk	10	G	6'5"	188	GS Senior	Warrington, PA	Bucknell
Camren Wynter	11	G	6'2"	185	GS Senior	Hempstead, NY	Drexel
Michael Henn	24	F	6'8"	225	GS Senior	Bellevue, WA	Denver

=== 2022 recruiting class ===
College recruiting information
Name	Hometown	School	Height	Weight	Commit date
Kebba Njie #15 C	Centerville, OH	La Lumiere School	6 ft 8 in (2.03 m)	205 lb (93 kg)	Aug 18, 2021
Kebba Njie #15 C	Recruit ratings: Scout: Rivals: 247Sports: ESPN: (82)				
Jameel Brown #29 SG	Haverford, PA	The Haverford School	6 ft 3 in (1.91 m)	170 lb (77 kg)	Aug 23, 2021
Jameel Brown #29 SG	Recruit ratings: Scout: Rivals: 247Sports: ESPN: (82)				
Kanye Clary #40 PG	Woodstock, VA	Massanutten Military Academy	5 ft 11 in (1.80 m)	180 lb (82 kg)	Jun 3, 2021
Kanye Clary #40 PG	Recruit ratings: Scout: Rivals: 247Sports: ESPN: (80)				
Demetrius Lilley #57 C	Wynnewood, PA	Lower Merion High School	6 ft 9 in (2.06 m)	230 lb (100 kg)	Sep 24, 2021
Demetrius Lilley #57 C	Recruit ratings: Scout: Rivals: 247Sports: ESPN: (78)				
Evan Mahaffey #47 SF	Cincinnati, OH	Archbishop Moeller High School	6 ft 5 in (1.96 m)	175 lb (79 kg)	Aug 11, 2021
Evan Mahaffey #47 SF	Recruit ratings: Scout: Rivals: 247Sports: ESPN: (78)				
Overall recruit ranking:
Note: In many cases, Scout, Rivals, 247Sports, On3, and ESPN may conflict in their listings of height and weight.; In these cases, the average was taken. ESPN grades are on a 100-point scale.; Sources: "2022 Team Ranking". Rivals.

== Roster ==
2022–23 Penn State Nittany Lions men's basketball team
Players
Coaches

Pos.	#	Name	Height	Weight	Year	Previous school	Hometown
G	0	Kanye Clary	5 ft 11 in (1.8 m)	185 lb (84 kg)	Fr	Massanutten Military Academy	Virginia Beach, Virginia
F	1	Seth Lundy	6 ft 6 in (1.98 m)	221 lb (100 kg)	Sr	Roman Catholic High School	Paulsboro, New Jersey
G	2	Myles Dread	6 ft 4 in (1.93 m)	235 lb (107 kg)	GS	Gonzaga College High School	Detroit, Michigan
F	3	Kebba Njie	6 ft 10 in (2.08 m)	235 lb (107 kg)	Fr	La Lumiere School	Centerville, Ohio
F	4	Caleb Dorsey	6 ft 7 in (2.01 m)	235 lb (107 kg)	Jr	The Hill School	Westminster, Maryland
G	5	Jameel Brown	6 ft 4 in (1.93 m)	185 lb (84 kg)	Fr	Westtown School	Philadelphia, Pennsylvania
G	10	Andrew Funk	6 ft 5 in (1.96 m)	190 lb (86 kg)	GS	Bucknell	Warrington, Pennsylvania
G	11	Camren Wynter	6 ft 2 in (1.88 m)	185 lb (84 kg)	GS	Drexel	Hempstead, New York
G/F	12	Evan Mahaffey	6 ft 6 in (1.98 m)	190 lb (86 kg)	Fr	Moeller High School	Cincinnati, Ohio
F	14	Demetrius Lilley	6 ft 10 in (2.08 m)	260 lb (118 kg)	Fr	Lower Merion High School	Philadelphia, Pennsylvania
G	15	Dan Conlan (W)	6 ft 4 in (1.93 m)	180 lb (82 kg)	Sr	Dickinson College	Sewickley, Pennsylvania
G	22	Jalen Pickett	6 ft 4 in (1.93 m)	202 lb (92 kg)	GS	Siena	Rochester, New York
G	23	Dallion Johnson	6 ft 3 in (1.91 m)	182 lb (83 kg)	Jr	Phillips Academy	Haverhill, Massachusetts
F	24	Michael Henn	6 ft 8 in (2.03 m)	240 lb (109 kg)	GS	Denver	Bellevue, Washington
G	33	Andy Christos (W)	6 ft 5 in (1.96 m)	179 lb (81 kg)	Jr	Madison High School	Madison, New Jersey
G	35	Ishaan Jagiasi (W)	6 ft 1 in (1.85 m)	185 lb (84 kg)	Sr	Huntington Prep (WV)	Wilmington, Delaware

Head coach

- Micah Shrewsberry (Hanover)

Assistant coach(es)

- Adam Fisher (Penn State)
- Aki Collins (Clark Atlanta)
- Mike Farrelly (Saint Joseph's)

Legend

- (C) Team captain
- (S) Suspended
- (I) Ineligible
- (W) Walk-on
- Injured
- Current redshirt

Roster

== Coaching staff ==
Position	Name	Year	Alma mater
Head coach	Micah Shrewsberry	2021	Hanover (1999)
Associate head coach	Adam Fisher	2021	Penn State (2006)
Assistant Coach	Aki Collins	2021	Clark Atlanta (1997)
Assistant Coach	Mike Farrelly	2011	Saint Joseph's (2003)
Director of Basketball Operations	Nicholas Colella	2015	Penn State (2013)
Director of Recruiting	Brian Snow	2021	Ohio State (2007)
Athletic trainer	Justin Pomar	2021	Penn State (2014)
Director of player development	Mike Green	2021	Butler (2008)
Strength and conditioning coach	Greg Miskinis	2009	Penn State (2008)

== Schedule and results ==
Date time, TV	Rank^{#}	Opponent^{#}	Result	Record	High points	High rebounds	High assists	Site (attendance) city, state
Regular season
November 7, 2022*; 7:00 p.m., BTN+		Winthrop	W 93–68	1–0	23 – Pickett	6 – Dorsey	5 – Pickett	Bryce Jordan Center (6,572); University Park, PA
November 10, 2022*; 7:00 p.m., BTN+		Loyola (MD)	W 90–65	2–0	18 – Wynter	5 – Funk	11 – Pickett	Bryce Jordan Center (6,444); University Park, PA
November 14, 2022*; 8:30 p.m., FS1		Butler; Gavitt Tipoff Games	W 68–62	3–0	15 – Pickett	10 – Pickett	11 – Pickett	Bryce Jordan Center (6,762); University Park, PA
November 17, 2022*; 11:30 a.m., ESPNU		vs. Furman; Charleston Classic Quarterfinals	W 73–68	4–0	20 – Tied	7 – Lundy	7 – Pickett	TD Arena; Charleston, SC
November 18, 2022*; 12:00 p.m., ESPN2		vs. Virginia Tech; Charleston Classic semifinals	L 59–61	4–1	21 – Funk	9 – Lundy	8 – Pickett	TD Arena; Charleston, SC
November 20, 2022*; 6:00 p.m., ESPNU		vs. Colorado State; Charleston Classic 3rd place game	W 68–56	5–1	17 – Lundy	11 – Pickett	3 – Pickett	TD Arena (5,405); Charleston, SC
November 25, 2022*; 7:00 p.m., BTN+		Lafayette	W 70–57	6–1	18 – Pickett	7 – Lundy	8 – Pickett	Bryce Jordan Center (5,652); University Park, PA
November 29, 2022*; 7:15 p.m., ESPNU		at Clemson; ACC–Big Ten Challenge	L 94–101 ^{2OT}	6–2	26 – Wynter	12 – Lundy	8 – Pickett	Littlejohn Coliseum (5,861); Clemson, SC
December 7, 2022; 6:30 p.m., BTN		Michigan State	L 58–67	6–3 (0–1)	16 – Lundy	17 – Pickett	8 – Pickett	Bryce Jordan Center (8,302); University Park, PA
December 10, 2022; 12:00 p.m., BTN		at No. 17 Illinois	W 74–59	7–3 (1–1)	20 – Tied	7 – Tied	6 – Pickett	State Farm Center (15,544); Champaign, IL
December 18, 2022*; 12:00 p.m., BTN		Canisius	W 97–67	8–3	16 – Pickett	8 – Nije	9 – Pickett	Bryce Jordan Center (4,342); University Park, PA
December 22, 2022*; 4:30 p.m., BTN		Quinnipiac	W 77–68	9–3	21 – Pickett	12 – Pickett	9 – Pickett	Bryce Jordan Center (3,804); University Park, PA
December 29, 2022*; 7:00 p.m., BTN+		Delaware State	W 60–46	10–3	15 – Lundy	10 – Lundy	6 – Pickett	Bryce Jordan Center (5,454); University Park, PA
January 1, 2023; 5:30 p.m., BTN		Iowa	W 83–79	11–3 (2–1)	26 – Pickett	7 – Pickett	6 – Pickett	Bryce Jordan Center (6,060); University Park, PA
January 4, 2023; 7:00 p.m., BTN		at Michigan	L 69–79	11–4 (2–2)	26 – Pickett	9 – Pickett	4 – Pickett	Crisler Center (12,707); Ann Arbor, MI
January 8, 2023; 6:00 p.m., BTN		vs. No. 1 Purdue	L 63–76	11–5 (2–3)	26 – Pickett	9 – Pickett	8 – Pickett	Palestra (8,722); Philadelphia, PA
January 11, 2023; 7:00 p.m., BTN		Indiana	W 85–66	12–5 (3–3)	25 – Lundy	6 – Lundy	8 – Pickett	Bryce Jordan Center (8,502); University Park, PA
January 17, 2023; 8:30 p.m., BTN		at Wisconsin	L 60–63	12–6 (3–4)	19 – Pickett	12 – Pickett	6 – Pickett	Kohl Center (14,236); Madison, WI
January 21, 2023; 2:15 p.m., BTN		Nebraska	W 76–65	13–6 (4–4)	23 – Funk	13 – Pickett	5 – Pickett	Bryce Jordan Center (11,297); University Park, PA
January 24, 2023; 6:30 p.m., BTN		at Rutgers	L 45–65	13–7 (4–5)	15 – Pickett	8 – Pickett	3 – Dread	Jersey Mike's Arena (8,038); Piscataway, NJ
January 29, 2023; 12:00 p.m., BTN		Michigan	W 83–61	14–7 (5–5)	25 – Pickett	8 – Pickett	8 – Pickett	Bryce Jordan Center (12,047); University Park, PA
February 1, 2023; 6:30 p.m., BTN		at No. 1 Purdue	L 60–80	14–8 (5–6)	18 – Lundy	6 – Lundy	7 – Pickett	Mackey Arena (14,876); West Lafayette, IN
February 5, 2023; 4:30 p.m., BTN		at Nebraska	L 63–72	14–9 (5–7)	24 – Lundy	9 – Njie	7 – Pickett	Pinnacle Bank Arena (14,385); Lincoln, NE
February 8, 2023; 8:30 p.m., BTN		Wisconsin	L 74–79 ^{OT}	14–10 (5–8)	17 – Pickett	9 – Lundy	8 – Pickett	Bryce Jordan Center (7,213); University Park, PA
February 11, 2023; 12:00 p.m., BTN		at Maryland	L 68–74	14–11 (5–9)	17 – Clary	7 – Lundy	5 – Pickett	Xfinity Center (17,950); College Park, MD
February 14, 2023; 7:00 p.m., ESPNU		Illinois	W 93–81	15–11 (6–9)	41 – Pickett	7 – Lundy	8 – Pickett	Bryce Jordan Center (7,297); University Park, PA
February 18, 2023; 7:00 p.m., BTN		at Minnesota	W 76–69	16–11 (7–9)	32 – Pickett	9 – Pickett	8 – Pickett	Williams Arena (11,693); Minneapolis, MN
February 23, 2023; 6:30 p.m., FS1		at Ohio State	W 75–71	17–11 (8–9)	23 – Pickett	6 – Wynter	4 – Pickett	Value City Arena (11,996); Columbus, OH
February 26, 2023; 6:30 p.m., BTN		Rutgers	L 56–59	17–12 (8–10)	16 – Wynter	9 – Pickett	5 – Pickett	Bryce Jordan Center (12,082); University Park, PA
March 1, 2023; 9:00 p.m., BTN		at Northwestern	W 68–65 ^{OT}	18–12 (9–10)	24 – Wynter	8 – Funk	11 – Pickett	Welsh–Ryan Arena (7,039); Evanston, IL
March 5, 2023; 12:00 p.m., BTN		No. 21 Maryland	W 65–64	19–12 (10–10)	16 – Pickett	7 – Pickett	6 – Pickett	Bryce Jordan Center (10,672); University Park, PA
Big Ten tournament
March 9, 2023; 6:30 p.m., BTN	(10)	vs. (7) Illinois; Second round	W 79–76	20–12	20 – Funk	10 – Lundy	8 – Pickett	United Center; Chicago, IL
March 10, 2023; 6:30 p.m., BTN	(10)	vs. (2) Northwestern; Quarterfinals	W 67–65 ^{OT}	21–12	16 – Lundy	9 – Pickett	2 – Tied	United Center; Chicago, IL
March 11, 2023; 3:30 p.m., CBS	(10)	vs. (3) No. 19 Indiana; Semifinals	W 77–73	22–12	28 – Pickett	9 – Njie	4 – Pickett	United Center (18,059); Chicago, IL
March 12, 2023; 3:30 p.m., CBS	(10)	vs. (1) No. 5 Purdue; Championship	L 65–67	22–13	19 – Lundy	8 – Lundy	4 – Tied	United Center; Chicago, IL
NCAA tournament
March 16, 2023*; 9:55 pm, TBS	(10 MW)	vs. (7 MW) No. 17 Texas A&M; First Round	W 76–59	23–13	27 – Funk	7 – Pickett	8 – Pickett	Wells Fargo Arena (16,728); Des Moines, IA
March 18, 2023*; 7:45 p.m., CBS	(10 MW)	vs. (2 MW) No. 5 Texas; Second Round	L 66–71	23–14	16 – Wynter	10 – Pickett	3 – Funk	Wells Fargo Arena (16,796); Des Moines, IA
*Non-conference game. ^{#}Rankings from AP Poll. (#) Tournament seedings in parentheses. MW=Midwest. All times are in Eastern Time.
