= 2022–23 Purdue Boilermakers men's basketball team =

U.S. collegiate team

2022–23 Purdue Boilermakers men's basketball

Phil Knight Legacy champions Big Ten regular season champions Big Ten tournament champions

NCAA tournament, First Round
- Conference: Big Ten Conference

Ranking
- Coaches: No. 13
- AP: No. 3
- Record: 29–6 (15–5 Big Ten)
- Head coach: Matt Painter (18th season)
- Assistant coaches: Brandon Brantley (10th season); Terry Johnson (2nd season); Paul Lusk (2nd season)
- Home arena: Mackey Arena

2022–23 Big Ten Conference men's basketball standings
	Conf.				Overall
Team	W		L	PCT	W		L	PCT
No. 3 Purdue †	15	–	5	.750	29	–	6	.829
No. 21 Indiana	12	–	8	.600	23	–	12	.657
Northwestern	12	–	8	.600	22	–	12	.647
Michigan State	11	–	8	.579	21	–	13	.618
Maryland	11	–	9	.550	22	–	13	.629
Illinois	11	–	9	.550	20	–	13	.606
Iowa	11	–	9	.550	19	–	14	.576
Michigan	11	–	9	.550	18	–	16	.529
Penn State	10	–	10	.500	23	–	14	.622
Rutgers	10	–	10	.500	19	–	15	.559
Wisconsin	9	–	11	.450	20	–	15	.571
Nebraska	9	–	11	.450	16	–	16	.500
Ohio State	5	–	15	.250	16	–	19	.457
Minnesota	2	–	17	.105	9	–	22	.290
† Conference tournament winner Rankings from AP poll

The 2022–23 Purdue Boilermakers men's basketball team represented Purdue University in the 2022–23 NCAA Division I men's basketball season. Their head coach was Matt Painter, who coached his 18th season with the Boilermakers. The Boilermakers played their home games at Mackey Arena in West Lafayette, Indiana as members of the Big Ten Conference.

With Northwestern's loss to Maryland on February 26, 2023, Purdue clinched a share of the Big Ten regular season championship. With Michigan's loss to Illinois on March 2, Purdue clinched the outright regular season championship, its first outright championship since 2017. The championship marked the school's 25th, the most in Big Ten history. In the Big Ten tournament, they defeated Rutgers, Ohio State, and Penn State to win the tournament championship, the school's second. As a result, they received the conference's automatic bid to the NCAA tournament as the No. 1 seed in the East region. In the first round of the tournament they were upset by Fairleigh Dickinson, becoming the second men's No. 1 seed to lose to a No. 16 seed ever, following Virginia's 2018 loss to UMBC.

== Previous season ==
The Boilermakers finished the 2021–22 season 29–8, 14–6 in Big Ten play to finish in third place. They defeated Penn State and Michigan State in the Big Ten tournament to advance to the championship game where they lost to Iowa. They received an at-large bid to the NCAA tournament as the No. 3 seed in the East region. There they defeated Yale and Texas to advance to the Sweet Sixteen. In the Sweet Sixteen, they were upset by No. 15-seeded Saint Peter's.

== Offseason ==
=== Departures ===
Name	Number	Pos.	Height	Weight	Year	Hometown	Reason for departure
Eric Hunter Jr.	2	G	6'4"	175	Senior	Indianapolis, IN	Transferred to Butler
Isaiah Thompson	11	G	6'1"	160	Junior	Zionsville, IN	Transferred to Florida Gulf Coast
Jared Wulbrun	14	G	5'10"	180	Senior	Stanford, CA	Graduated; Graduate Assistant at Purdue
Jaden Ivey	23	G	6'4"	195	Junior	South Bend, IN	Declared for the 2022 NBA draft; selected 5th overall pick by the Detroit Pistons
Trevion Williams	50	F	6'10"	255	Senior	Chicago, IL	Declared for the 2022 NBA Draft
Sasha Stefanovic	55	G	6'5"	205	Senior	Crown Point, IN	Declared for the 2022 NBA Draft

=== Incoming transfers ===
Name	Number	Pos.	Height	Weight	Year	Hometown	Previous school
David Jenkins Jr.	14	G	6'1"	200	Senior	Tacoma, WA	Transferred from Utah

=== Recruiting classes ===
==== 2022 recruiting class ====
College recruiting information
Name	Hometown	School	Height	Weight	Commit date
Fletcher Loyer; SG	Fort Wayne, IN	Homestead (IN)	6 ft 3 in (1.91 m)	165 lb (75 kg)	Nov 23, 2020
Fletcher Loyer; SG	Recruit ratings: Rivals: 247Sports: ESPN: (82)				
Braden Smith; SG	Westfield, IN	Westfield (IN)	5 ft 10 in (1.78 m)	165 lb (75 kg)	Apr 29, 2021
Braden Smith; SG	Recruit ratings: Rivals: 247Sports: ESPN: (81)				
Camden Heide; SF	Plymouth, MN	Wayzata High School (MN)	6 ft 5 in (1.96 m)	180 lb (82 kg)	Jun 15, 2021
Camden Heide; SF	Recruit ratings: Rivals: 247Sports: ESPN: (80)				
Will Berg; C	Stockholm, Sweden	Riksbasketgymnasiet Luleå	7 ft 2 in (2.18 m)	260 lb (120 kg)	Dec 16, 2021
Will Berg; C	Recruit ratings: No ratings found				
Overall recruit ranking: Rivals: 40 247Sports: 34 ESPN: —
Note: In many cases, Scout, Rivals, 247Sports, On3, and ESPN may conflict in their listings of height and weight.; In these cases, the average was taken. ESPN grades are on a 100-point scale.; Sources: "Purdue 2022 Basketball Commitments". Rivals.; "2022 Purdue Boilermakers Recruiting Class". ESPN.; "2022 Team Ranking". Rivals.

==== 2023 Recruiting class ====
College recruiting information (2023)
Name	Hometown	School	Height	Weight	Commit date
Myles Colvin; SG	Indianapolis, IN	Heritage Christian School (IN)	6 ft 4 in (1.93 m)	180 lb (82 kg)	Jul 7, 2021
Myles Colvin; SG	Recruit ratings: Rivals: 247Sports:				
Overall recruit ranking: Rivals: — 247Sports: 34 ESPN: —
Note: In many cases, Scout, Rivals, 247Sports, On3, and ESPN may conflict in their listings of height and weight.; In these cases, the average was taken. ESPN grades are on a 100-point scale.; Sources: "Purdue 2023 Basketball Commitments". Rivals.; "2023 Purdue Boilermakers Recruiting Class". ESPN.; "2023 Team Ranking". Rivals.

== Roster ==
2022–23 Purdue Boilermakers men's basketball team
Players
Coaches

Pos.	#	Name	Height	Weight	Year	Previous school	Hometown
F	0	Mason Gillis	6 ft 6 in (1.98 m)	230 lb (104 kg)	RS Jr	New Castle HS	New Castle, IN
F	1	Caleb Furst	6 ft 10 in (2.08 m)	230 lb (104 kg)	So	Blackhawk Christian School	Fort Wayne, IN
G	2	Fletcher Loyer	6 ft 4 in (1.93 m)	185 lb (84 kg)	Fr	Homestead HS	Fort Wayne, IN
G	3	Braden Smith	6 ft 0 in (1.83 m)	180 lb (82 kg)	Fr	Westfield HS	Westfield, IN
F	4	Trey Kaufman-Renn	6 ft 9 in (2.06 m)	225 lb (102 kg)	RS Fr	Silver Creek HS	Sellersburg, IN
G	5	Brandon Newman	6 ft 5 in (1.96 m)	200 lb (91 kg)	RS Jr	Valparaiso HS	Valparaiso, IN
F	11	Brian Waddell	6 ft 8 in (2.03 m)	195 lb (88 kg)	RS Fr	Carmel HS	Carmel, IN
G	14	David Jenkins Jr.	6 ft 1 in (1.85 m)	200 lb (91 kg)	Sr	Utah	Tacoma, WA
C	15	Zach Edey	7 ft 4 in (2.24 m)	305 lb (138 kg)	Jr	IMG Academy	Toronto, ON
F	21	Matt Frost	6 ft 5 in (1.96 m)	200 lb (91 kg)	Sr	Columbus East HS	Columbus, IN
G	22	Chase Martin (W)	6 ft 2 in (1.88 m)	180 lb (82 kg)	Jr	Tolton HS	Columbia, MO
F	23	Camden Heide (redshirt)	6 ft 7 in (2.01 m)	205 lb (93 kg)	Fr	Wasatch Academy	Wayzata, MN
F	24	Sam King (W)	6 ft 8 in (2.03 m)	225 lb (102 kg)	Fr	Columbus North HS	Columbus, IN
G	25	Ethan Morton	6 ft 7 in (2.01 m)	215 lb (98 kg)	Jr	Butler Area HS	Butler, PA
G	34	Carson Barrett (W)	6 ft 5 in (1.96 m)	215 lb (98 kg)	Jr	Lafayette Central Catholic HS	Lafayette, IN
C	44	Will Berg (redshirt)	7 ft 2 in (2.18 m)	260 lb (118 kg)	Fr	Riksbasketgymnasiet Luleå	Stockholm, Sweden

Head coach

- Matt Painter (Purdue)

Assistant coach(es)

- Brandon Brantley (Purdue)
- Terry Johnson (Purdue Fort Wayne)
- Paul Lusk (Southern Illinois)

Legend

- (C) Team captain
- (S) Suspended
- (I) Ineligible
- (W) Walk-on
- Injured
- Current redshirt

Roster

== Schedule and results ==
Date time, TV	Rank^{#}	Opponent^{#}	Result	Record	High points	High rebounds	High assists	Site (attendance) city, state
Exhibition
November 2, 2022*; 7:00 pm, BTN+		Truman State	W 102–57		23 – Edey	7 – Edey	6 – Loyer	Mackey Arena (14,786); West Lafayette, IN
Regular season
November 8, 2022*; 6:30 pm, BTN		Milwaukee	W 84–53	1–0	16 – Newman	17 – Edey	6 – Morton	Mackey Arena (14,876); West Lafayette, IN
November 11, 2022*; 7:00 pm, BTN		Austin Peay	W 63–44	2–0	30 – Edey	11 – Edey	4 – Morton	Mackey Arena (14,876); West Lafayette, IN
November 15, 2022*; 8:30 pm, FS1		Marquette; Gavitt Tipoff Games	W 75–70	3–0	20 – Tied	13 – Edey	3 – Smith	Mackey Arena (14,876); West Lafayette, IN
November 24, 2022*; 10:00 pm, ESPN2	No. 24	vs. West Virginia; Phil Knight Legacy quarterfinals	W 80–68	4–0	24 – Edey	12 – Edey	9 – Morton	Veterans Memorial Coliseum; Portland, OR
November 25, 2022*; 11:30 p.m., ESPN	No. 24	vs. No. 6 Gonzaga; Phil Knight Legacy semifinals	W 84–66	5–0	23 – Edey	7 – Tied	7 – Smith	Moda Center (8,090); Portland, OR
November 27, 2022*; 3:30 p.m., ABC	No. 24	vs. No. 8 Duke; Phil Knight Legacy championship	W 75–56	6–0	21 – Edey	12 – Edey	6 – Morton	Moda Center (7,168); Portland, OR
November 30, 2022*; 7:15 pm, ESPN2	No. 5	at Florida State; ACC–Big Ten Challenge	W 79–69	7–0	21 – Edey	9 – Smith	7 – Smith	Donald L. Tucker Civic Center (5,852); Tallahassee, FL
December 4, 2022; 5:00 pm, BTN	No. 5	Minnesota	W 89–70	8–0 (1–0)	31 – Edey	22 – Edey	8 – Loyer	Mackey Arena (14,876); West Lafayette, IN
December 7, 2022*; 7:00 pm, BTN+	No. 4	Hofstra	W 85–66	9–0	23 – Edey	18 – Edey	5 – Loyer	Mackey Arena (14,876); West Lafayette, IN
December 10, 2022; 2:15 pm, BTN	No. 4	at Nebraska	W 65–62 ^{OT}	10–0 (2–0)	22 – Loyer	17 – Edey	4 – Smith	Pinnacle Bank Arena (14,236); Lincoln, NE
December 17, 2022*; 6:15 pm, BTN	No. 1	vs. Davidson; Indy Classic	W 69–61	11–0	29 – Edey	16 – Edey	4 – Smith	Gainbridge Fieldhouse (9,242); Indianapolis, IN
December 21, 2022*; 9:00 pm, ESPNU	No. 1	New Orleans	W 74–53	12–0	24 – Kaufman-Renn	7 – Morton	3 – Tied	Mackey Arena (14,876); West Lafayette, IN
December 29, 2022*; 5:00 pm, BTN	No. 1	Florida A&M	W 82–49	13–0	18 – Newman	10 – Edey	4 – Smith	Mackey Arena (14,876); West Lafayette, IN
January 2, 2023; 7:00 pm, BTN	No. 1	Rutgers	L 64–65	13–1 (2–1)	19 – Edey	11 – Edey	4 – Smith	Mackey Arena (14,876); West Lafayette, IN
January 5, 2023; 7:00 pm, FS1	No. 1	at No. 24 Ohio State	W 71–69	14–1 (3–1)	16 – Tied	11 – Edey	6 – Smith	Value City Arena (17,227); Columbus, OH
January 8, 2023; 6:00 pm, BTN	No. 1	vs. Penn State	W 76–63	15–1 (4–1)	30 – Edey	13 – Edey	7 – Smith	Palestra (8,722); Philadelphia, PA
January 13, 2023; 7:00 pm, BTN	No. 3	Nebraska	W 73–55	16–1 (5–1)	27 – Loyer	13 – Edey	4 – Smith	Mackey Arena (14,876); West Lafayette, IN
January 16, 2023; 2:30 pm, FOX	No. 3	at Michigan State	W 64–63	17–1 (6–1)	32 – Edey	17 – Edey	6 – Smith	Breslin Center (14,797); East Lansing, MI
January 19, 2023; 7:00 pm, ESPN2	No. 3	at Minnesota	W 61–39	18–1 (7–1)	19 – Smith	9 – Furst	7 – Smith	Williams Arena (9,251); Minneapolis, MN
January 22, 2023; 1:00 pm, FS1	No. 3	Maryland	W 58–55	19–1 (8–1)	24 – Edey	16 – Edey	4 – Tied	Mackey Arena (14,876); West Lafayette, IN
January 26, 2023; 9:00 pm, FS1	No. 1	at Michigan	W 75–70	20–1 (9–1)	19 – Edey	9 – Edey	2 – Tied	Crisler Center (12,707); Ann Arbor, MI
January 29, 2023; 12:15 pm, CBS	No. 1	Michigan State	W 77–61	21–1 (10–1)	38 – Edey	13 – Edey	4 – Tied	Mackey Arena (14,876); West Lafayette, IN
February 1, 2023; 6:30 pm, BTN	No. 1	Penn State	W 80–60	22–1 (11–1)	29 – Gillis	13 – Edey	9 – Smith	Mackey Arena (14,876); West Lafayette, IN
February 4, 2023; 4:00 pm, ESPN	No. 1	at No. 21 Indiana; Rivalry/Indiana National Guard Governor's Cup	L 74–79	22–2 (11–2)	33 – Edey	18 – Edey	6 – Smith	Simon Skjodt Assembly Hall (17,222); Bloomington, IN
February 9, 2023; 7:00 pm, ESPN2	No. 1	Iowa	W 87–73	23–2 (12–2)	24 – Smith	14 – Edey	5 – Smith	Mackey Arena (14,876); West Lafayette, IN
February 12, 2023; 2:00 pm, BTN	No. 1	at Northwestern	L 58–64	23–3 (12–3)	24 – Edey	8 – Edey	4 – Smith	Welsh–Ryan Arena (7,039); Evanston, IL
February 16, 2023; 6:30 pm, BTN	No. 3	at Maryland	L 54–68	23–4 (12–4)	18 – Tied	8 – Edey	3 – Tied	Xfinity Center (17,950); College Park, MD
February 19, 2023; 1:00 pm, CBS	No. 3	Ohio State	W 82–55	24–4 (13–4)	26 – Edey	11 – Edey	4 – Loyer	Mackey Arena (14,876); West Lafayette, IN
February 25, 2023; 7:30 pm, FOX	No. 5	No. 17 Indiana; Rivalry/Indiana National Guard Governor's Cup	L 71–79	24–5 (13–5)	26 – Edey	16 – Edey	6 – Smith	Mackey Arena (14,876); West Lafayette, IN
March 2, 2023; 9:00 pm, FS1	No. 5	at Wisconsin	W 63–61	25–5 (14–5)	17 – Edey	19 – Edey	3 – Edey	Kohl Center (17,071); Madison, WI
March 5, 2023; 12:30 pm, FOX	No. 5	Illinois	W 76–71	26–5 (15–5)	19 – Newman	6 – Tied	5 – Newman	Mackey Arena (14,876); West Lafayette, IN
Big Ten tournament
March 10, 2023; 12:00 pm, BTN	(1) No. 5	vs. (9) Rutgers; Quarterfinals	W 70–65	27–5	20 – Gillis	11 – Edey	5 – Smith	United Center (16,738); Chicago, IL
March 11, 2023; 1:00 pm, CBS	(1) No. 5	vs. (13) Ohio State; Semifinals	W 80–66	28–5	32 – Edey	14 – Edey	5 – Tied	United Center (17,983); Chicago, IL
March 12, 2023; 3:30 pm, CBS	(1) No. 5	vs. (10) Penn State; Championship	W 67–65	29–5	30 – Edey	13 – Edey	7 – Smith	United Center; Chicago, IL
NCAA tournament
March 17, 2023*; 6:50 pm, TNT	(1 E) No. 3	vs. (16 E) Fairleigh Dickinson; First Round	L 58–63	29–6	21 – Edey	15 – Edey	6 – Smith	Nationwide Arena (19,564); Columbus, OH
*Non-conference game. ^{#}Rankings from AP Poll. (#) Tournament seedings in parentheses. E=East. All times are in Eastern Time.

== Rankings ==
Ranking movements Legend: ██ Increase in ranking ██ Decrease in ranking RV = Received votes ( ) = First-place votes
	Week																			
Poll	1	2	3	4	5	6	7	8	9	10	11	12	13	14	15	16	17	18	19	Final
AP	RV	RV	24	5 (8)	4 (8)	1 (27)	1 (40)	1 (40)	1 (60)	3 (4)	3 (3)	1 (39)	1 (62)	1 (38)	3 (2)	5	5	5	3 (3)	Not released
Coaches	RV	24	23	5 (3)	4 (6)	1 (9)	1 (24)	1 (25)	1 (30)	3 (6)	3 (5)	1 (24)	1 (32)	1 (15)	3 (1)	5	5	3	3	13

*AP does not release post-NCAA Tournament rankings.
