= 2022–23 Northwestern Wildcats men's basketball team =

American college basketball team

2022–23 Northwestern Wildcats men's basketball

NCAA tournament, Second Round
- Conference: Big Ten Conference
- Record: 22–12 (12–8 Big Ten)
- Head coach: Chris Collins (10th season)
- Assistant coaches: Chris Lowery; Talor Battle; Bryant McIntosh
- Home arena: Welsh–Ryan Arena

2022–23 Big Ten Conference men's basketball standings
	Conf.				Overall
Team	W		L	PCT	W		L	PCT
No. 3 Purdue †	15	–	5	.750	29	–	6	.829
No. 21 Indiana	12	–	8	.600	23	–	12	.657
Northwestern	12	–	8	.600	22	–	12	.647
Michigan State	11	–	8	.579	21	–	13	.618
Maryland	11	–	9	.550	22	–	13	.629
Illinois	11	–	9	.550	20	–	13	.606
Iowa	11	–	9	.550	19	–	14	.576
Michigan	11	–	9	.550	18	–	16	.529
Penn State	10	–	10	.500	23	–	14	.622
Rutgers	10	–	10	.500	19	–	15	.559
Wisconsin	9	–	11	.450	20	–	15	.571
Nebraska	9	–	11	.450	16	–	16	.500
Ohio State	5	–	15	.250	16	–	19	.457
Minnesota	2	–	17	.105	9	–	22	.290
† Conference tournament winner Rankings from AP poll

The 2022–23 Northwestern Wildcats men's basketball team represented Northwestern University in the 2022–23 NCAA Division I men's basketball season. They were led by 10th-year head coach Chris Collins. The Wildcats played their home games at Welsh–Ryan Arena in Evanston, Illinois as members of the Big Ten Conference. They finished the season 21–10, 12–8 in Big Ten play, to finish in a tie for second place, their highest finish since the 1958–59 season. This season was also notable as the first time Northwestern defeated a number-one ranked opponent, during a home game against Purdue on February 12. As the No. 2 seed in the Big Ten tournament, they were upset in the quarterfinals by No. 10 seed Penn State. The Wildcats received an at-large bid to the NCAA tournament, their second-ever appearance, where they named as the No. 7 seed in the West Region. The Wildcats defeated Boise State in the first round before falling to UCLA in the second round, closing their season with an overall record of 22–12.

== Previous season ==
The Wildcats finished the 2021–22 season 15–16, 7–13 in Big Ten play, to finish in a three-way tie for 10th place. As the No. 12 seed in the Big Ten tournament, they defeated Nebraska in the first round before losing to Iowa in the second round.

== Offseason ==
=== Departures ===
Name	Number	Pos.	Height	Weight	Year	Hometown	Reason for departure
Ryan Greer	2	G	6'2"	190	Senior	Atlanta, GA	Left the team to personal reasons
Casey Simmons	14	G	6'6"	180	Freshman	Milton, MA	Transferred to Yale
Ryan Young	15	C	6'10"	240	RS Junior	Stewartsville, NJ	Graduate transferred to Duke
Elyjah Williams	21	F	6'7"	220	GS Senior	Evanston, IL	Graduated
Pete Nance	22	F	6'10"	225	Senior	Akron, OH	Graduate transferred to North Carolina
Dylan Sandhu	54	G	6'4"	160	RS Junior	Northville, MI	Walk-on; left the team for personal reasons

=== Incoming transfers ===
Name	Number	Pos.	Height	Weight	Year	Hometown	Previous college
Tydus Verhoeven	10	F	6'9"	225	GS Senior	Manteca, CA	UTEP

=== Recruiting classes ===
==== 2022 recruiting class ====
College recruiting information
Name	Hometown	School	Height	Weight	Commit date
Luke Hunger; C	Montreal, QC	Northfield-Mt. Hermon School	6 ft 9 in (2.06 m)	250 lb (110 kg)	Nov 2, 2021
Luke Hunger; C	Recruit ratings: Rivals: 247Sports: ESPN: (80)				
Nick Martinelli; SF	Glenview, IL	Glenbrook South High School	6 ft 7 in (2.01 m)	200 lb (91 kg)	Apr 23, 2022
Nick Martinelli; SF	Recruit ratings: Rivals: 247Sports: ESPN: (NR)				
Overall recruit ranking:
Note: In many cases, Scout, Rivals, 247Sports, On3, and ESPN may conflict in their listings of height and weight.; In these cases, the average was taken. ESPN grades are on a 100-point scale.; Sources: "2022 Northwestern Commits". Rivals.; "2022 Team Ranking". Rivals.

==== 2023 recruiting class ====
College recruiting information (2023)
Name	Hometown	School	Height	Weight	Commit date
Jordan Clayton; PG	Medford, MA	Bradford Christian School	6 ft 0 in (1.83 m)	180 lb (82 kg)	Aug 12, 2022
Jordan Clayton; PG	Recruit ratings: Rivals: 247Sports: ESPN: (NR)				
Overall recruit ranking:
Note: In many cases, Scout, Rivals, 247Sports, On3, and ESPN may conflict in their listings of height and weight.; In these cases, the average was taken. ESPN grades are on a 100-point scale.; Sources: "2023 Northwestern Commits". Rivals.; "2023 Team Ranking". Rivals.

== Roster ==
2022–23 Northwestern Wildcats men's basketball team
Players
Coaches

Pos.	#	Name	Height	Weight	Year	Previous school	Hometown
G	0	Boo Buie	6 ft 2 in (1.88 m)	180 lb (82 kg)	Sr	Gould Academy	Albany, NY
G	1	Chase Audige	6 ft 4 in (1.93 m)	200 lb (91 kg)	RS Sr	William & Mary	Coram, NY
F	2	Nick Martinelli	6 ft 7 in (2.01 m)	200 lb (91 kg)	Fr	Glenbrook South High School	Glenview, IL
G	3	Ty Berry	6 ft 3 in (1.91 m)	185 lb (84 kg)	Jr	Sunrise Christian Academy	Newton, KS
G	5	Julian Roper II (injured)	6 ft 3 in (1.91 m)	180 lb (82 kg)	So	St. Mary's Prep	Detroit, MI
F	10	Tydus Verhoeven	6 ft 9 in (2.06 m)	235 lb (107 kg)	GS	UTEP	Manteca, CA
G	13	Brooks Barnhizer	6 ft 6 in (1.98 m)	215 lb (98 kg)	So	Jefferson High School	Lafayette, IN
F	31	Robbie Beran	6 ft 9 in (2.06 m)	215 lb (98 kg)	Sr	Collegiate School	Richmond, VA
F	33	Luke Hunger (injured)	6 ft 10 in (2.08 m)	255 lb (116 kg)	Fr	Northfield Mount Hermon School	Montreal, QC
C	34	Matthew Nicholson	7 ft 0 in (2.13 m)	255 lb (116 kg)	Jr	Clarkston High School	Clarkston, MI
G	43	Blake Smith (W)	6 ft 6 in (1.98 m)	175 lb (79 kg)	Fr	Germantown Academy	Blue Bell, PA
G	53	Roy Dixon III (W)	5 ft 11 in (1.8 m)	170 lb (77 kg)	Sr	Greater Atlanta Christian	Atlanta, GA

Head coach

- Chris Collins (Duke)

Assistant coach(es)

- Chris Lowery (Southern Illinois)
- Talor Battle (Penn State)
- Bryant McIntosh (Northwestern)

Legend

- (C) Team captain
- (S) Suspended
- (I) Ineligible
- (W) Walk-on
- Injured
- Current redshirt

Roster
Last update: July 25, 2024

== Schedule and results ==
In the team's December 4, 2022 2022–23 Big Ten Conference men's basketball season opener against 20th-ranked Michigan State, Northwestern won on the road as 5.5-point underdogs. They defeated 15th-ranked Indiana on the road as 6-point underdogs on January 8, 2023. The Wildcats' originally scheduled game against Iowa on January 18, 2023 was postponed due to COVID-19 protocols within the Northwestern program. The game was rescheduled for January 31. The next game against Wisconsin on January 21 was also postponed due to COVID-19 protocols at Northwestern. On February 11 Northwestern defeated Purdue, earning its first-ever victory over an AP poll number one-ranked team. In the subsequent game on February 15, Northwestern established a school record with its fourth victory of the season over a ranked opponent by defeating 14th-ranked Indiana in a rematch. The victory also marked the first time the Wildcats had defeated ranked opponents in back-to-back games since the 2008–09 Northwestern Wildcats did so in January 2009.

Date time, TV	Rank^{#}	Opponent^{#}	Result	Record	High points	High rebounds	High assists	Site (attendance) city, state
Exhibition
November 2, 2022*; 7:00 p.m., BTN+		Quincy	W 69–49		15 – Audige	7 – Berry	7 – Audige	Welsh–Ryan Arena; Evanston, IL
Regular season
November 7, 2022*; 7:00 p.m., BTN+		Chicago State	W 85–54	1–0	20 – Beran	7 – tied	9 – Audige	Welsh–Ryan Arena (2,676); Evanston, IL
November 11, 2022*; 7:00 p.m., BTN+		Northern Illinois	W 63–46	2–0	15 – Beran	11 – Berry	7 – Buie	Welsh–Ryan Arena (3,077); Evanston, IL
November 15, 2022*; 5:30 p.m., FS1		at Georgetown; Gavitt Tipoff Games	W 75–63	3–0	17 – Audige	9 – Nicholson	6 – Buie	Capital One Arena (5,518); Washington, D.C.
November 18, 2022*; 7:00 p.m., BTN+		Purdue Fort Wayne; Cancún Challenge campus-site game	W 60–52	4–0	28 – Buie	8 – Beran	6 – Audige	Welsh–Ryan Arena (2,931); Evanston, IL
November 22, 2022*; 7:30 p.m., CBSSN		vs. Liberty; Cancún Challenge Riviera Division semifinals	W 66–52	5–0	20 – Audige	7 – tied	5 – Audige	Hard Rock Hotel Riviera Maya (321); Cancún, Mexico
November 23, 2022*; 7:30 p.m., CBSSN		vs. No. 13 Auburn; Cancún Challenge Riviera Division championship	L 42–43	5–1	10 – Audige	8 – Beran	3 – Buie	Hard Rock Hotel Riviera Maya (1,156); Cancún, Mexico
November 28, 2022*; 8:00 p.m., ESPN2		Pittsburgh; ACC–Big Ten Challenge	L 58–87	5–2	14 – Audige	5 – Berry	5 – Buie	Welsh–Ryan Arena (2,606); Evanston, IL
December 4, 2022; 6:00 p.m., BTN		at No. 20 Michigan State	W 70–63	6–2 (1–0)	20 – Buie	7 – Beran	3 – Buie	Breslin Center (14,797); East Lansing, MI
December 11, 2022*; 1:00 p.m., BTN		Prairie View A&M	W 61–51	7–2	20 – Beran	12 – Beran	7 – Buie	Welsh–Ryan Arena (3,861); Evanston, IL
December 17, 2022*; 1:00 p.m., BTN		DePaul	W 83–45	8–2	28 – Audige	8 – Nicholson	3 – tied	Welsh–Ryan Arena (4,081); Evanston, IL
December 20, 2022*; 8:00 p.m., BTN		UIC	W 92–54	9–2	19 – Audige	8 – Barnhizer	5 – tied	Welsh–Ryan Arena (3,704); Evanston, IL
December 29, 2022*; 12:00 p.m., BTN		Brown	W 63–58	10–2	24 – Audige	11 – Nicholson	4 – Buie	Welsh–Ryan Arena (3,730); Evanston, IL
January 1, 2023; 6:30 p.m., BTN		Ohio State	L 57–73	10–3 (1–1)	16 – Audige	13 – Nicholson	3 – Buie	Welsh–Ryan Arena (4,372); Evanston, IL
January 4, 2023; 8:00 p.m., BTN		Illinois; Rivalry	W 73–60	11–3 (2–1)	21 – Audige	7 – tied	4 – Buie	Welsh–Ryan Arena (7,039); Evanston, IL
January 8, 2023; 11:00 a.m., FS1		at No. 15 Indiana	W 84–83	12–3 (3–1)	26 – Buie	11 – Berry	8 – Audige	Simon Skjodt Assembly Hall (16,759); Bloomington, IN
January 11, 2023; 8:00 p.m., BTN		Rutgers	L 62–65	12–4 (3–2)	13 – tied	7 – Nicholson	7 – Buie	Welsh–Ryan Arena (5,274); Evanston, IL
January 15, 2023; 11:00 a.m., BTN		at Michigan	L 78–85	12–5 (3–3)	22 – Buie	5 – tied	5 – Buie	Crisler Center (12,009); Ann Arbor, MI
January 23, 2023; 5:30 p.m., BTN		Wisconsin; Rescheduled from January 21	W 66–63	13–5 (4–3)	20 – Buie	7 – Buie	5 – Buie	Welsh–Ryan Arena (4,218); Evanston, IL
January 25, 2023; 6:00 p.m., FS2		at Nebraska	W 78–63	14–5 (5–3)	26 – Berry	8 – Barnhizer	4 – Audige	Pinnacle Bank Arena (13,205); Lincoln, NE
January 28, 2023; 11:00 a.m., BTN		Minnesota	W 81–61	15–5 (6–3)	24 – Audige	5 – tied	8 – Buie	Welsh–Ryan Arena (6,064); Evanston, IL
January 31, 2023; 8:00 p.m., BTN		at Iowa; Rescheduled from January 18	L 70–86	15–6 (6–4)	20 – Buie	5 – tied	3 – Buie	Carver–Hawkeye Arena (11,667); Iowa City, IA
February 2, 2023; 6:00 p.m., ESPN2		Michigan	L 51–68	15–7 (6–5)	23 – Buie	7 – Nicholson	8 – Buie	Welsh–Ryan Arena (6,234); Evanston, IL
February 5, 2023; 5:30 p.m., BTN		at Wisconsin	W 54–52	16–7 (7–5)	13 – Buie	7 – tied	4 – Buie	Kohl Center (15,632); Madison, WI
February 9, 2023; 7:00 p.m., FS1		at Ohio State	W 69–63	17–7 (8–5)	19 – tied	4 – tied	5 – Buie	Value City Arena (12,305); Columbus, OH
February 12, 2023; 1:00 p.m., BTN		No. 1 Purdue	W 64–58	18–7 (9–5)	26 – Buie	7 – Berry	3 – tied	Welsh–Ryan Arena (7,039); Evanston, IL
February 15, 2023; 8:00 p.m., BTN		No. 14 Indiana	W 64–62	19–7 (10–5)	21 – Buie	6 – Buie	4 – Buie	Welsh–Ryan Arena (7,039); Evanston, IL
February 19, 2023; 5:30 p.m., BTN		Iowa	W 80–60	20–7 (11–5)	23 – Buie	7 – Barnhizer	8 – Buie	Welsh–Ryan Arena (7,039); Evanston, IL
February 23, 2023; 8:00 p.m., BTN	No. 21	at Illinois; Rivalry	L 62–66	20–8 (11–6)	35 – Buie	7 – Berry	2 – tied	State Farm Center (15,544); Champaign, IL
February 26, 2023; 11:00 a.m., BTN	No. 21	at Maryland	L 59–75	20–9 (11–7)	16 – Audige	6 – Berry	8 – Buie	Xfinity Center (17,950); College Park, MD
March 1, 2023; 8:00 p.m., BTN		Penn State	L 65–68 ^{OT}	20–10 (11–8)	20 – Buie	7 – Barnhizer	8 – Buie	Welsh–Ryan Arena (7,039); Evanston, IL
March 5, 2023; 6:30 p.m., BTN		at Rutgers	W 65–53	21–10 (12–8)	16 – Barnhizer	10 – Barnhizer	3 – Audige	Jersey Mike's Arena; Piscataway, NJ
Big Ten tournament
March 10, 2023; 5:30 p.m., BTN	(2)	vs. (10) Penn State; Quarterfinals	L 65–67 ^{OT}	21–11	16 – Buie	11 – Barnhizer	4 – Buie	United Center; Chicago, IL
NCAA tournament
March 16, 2023*; 6:35 p.m., TruTV	(7 W)	vs. (10 W) Boise State; First Round	W 75–67	22–11	22 – Buie	6 – tied	5 – Buie	Golden 1 Center; Sacramento, CA
March 18, 2023*; 7:40 p.m., TNT	(7 W)	vs. (2 W) No. 7 UCLA; Second Round	L 63–68	22–12	18 – Buie	9 – Nicholson	7 – Audige	Golden 1 Center (16,806); Sacramento, CA
*Non-conference game. ^{#}Rankings from AP poll. (#) Tournament seedings in parentheses. All times are in Central.

== Rankings ==
Ranking movements Legend: ██ Increase in ranking ██ Decrease in ranking — = Not ranked RV = Received votes
	Week																				
Poll	Pre	1	2	3	4	5	6	7	8	9	10	11	12	13	14	15	16	17	18	19	Final
AP	—	—	—	—	—	—	—	—	—	RV	—	—	—	RV	RV	RV	21	RV	RV		Not released
Coaches	—	—	—	—	—	—	—	—	—	RV	—	—	—	RV	RV	RV	22	RV	25		

*AP does not release post-NCAA tournament rankings.
