= 2022–23 Rutgers Scarlet Knights men's basketball team =

American college basketball season

2022–23 Rutgers Scarlet Knights men's basketball

NIT, First round
- Conference: Big Ten Conference
- Record: 19–15 (10–10 Big Ten)
- Head coach: Steve Pikiell (7th season)
- Associate head coach: Karl Hobbs
- Assistant coaches: Brandin Knight; T. J. Thompson
- Home arena: Jersey Mike's Arena

2022–23 Big Ten Conference men's basketball standings
	Conf.				Overall
Team	W		L	PCT	W		L	PCT
No. 3 Purdue †	15	–	5	.750	29	–	6	.829
No. 21 Indiana	12	–	8	.600	23	–	12	.657
Northwestern	12	–	8	.600	22	–	12	.647
Michigan State	11	–	8	.579	21	–	13	.618
Maryland	11	–	9	.550	22	–	13	.629
Illinois	11	–	9	.550	20	–	13	.606
Iowa	11	–	9	.550	19	–	14	.576
Michigan	11	–	9	.550	18	–	16	.529
Penn State	10	–	10	.500	23	–	14	.622
Rutgers	10	–	10	.500	19	–	15	.559
Wisconsin	9	–	11	.450	20	–	15	.571
Nebraska	9	–	11	.450	16	–	16	.500
Ohio State	5	–	15	.250	16	–	19	.457
Minnesota	2	–	17	.105	9	–	22	.290
† Conference tournament winner Rankings from AP poll

The 2022–23 Rutgers Scarlet Knights men's basketball team represented Rutgers University–New Brunswick during the 2022–23 NCAA Division I men's basketball season. The Scarlet Knights were led by seventh-year head coach Steve Pikiell and played their home games at Jersey Mike's Arena in Piscataway, New Jersey as members of the Big Ten Conference. They finished the season 18–13, 10–10 in Big Ten play, to finish a tie for ninth place. As the No. 9 seed in the Big Ten tournament, they defeated Michigan in the quarterfinals before losing to Purdue in the quarterfinals. The Knights received an invitation to the NIT tournament as a No. 1 seed. There, they were upset in the first round by Hofstra.

== Previous season ==
The Knights finished the 2020–21 season 18–14, 12–8 in Big Ten play, to finish a three-way tie for fourth place. As the No. 4 seed in the Big Ten tournament, they lost in the quarterfinals to Iowa. The Knights received an at-large bid to the NCAA tournament for the second consecutive year as a No. 11 seed in the West region. There they lost in the First Four to Notre Dame in double overtime.

== Offseason ==
=== Departures ===
Name	Number	Pos.	Height	Weight	Year	Hometown	Reason for departure
Geo Baker	0	G	6'4"	185	GS Senior	Derry, NH	Graduated
Ron Harper Jr.	24	G/F	6'6"	245	Senior	Franklin Lakes, NJ	Graduated/went undrafted in 2022 NBA draft
Ralph Gonzales-Agee	35	F	6'8"	245	GS Senior	Victorville, CA	Graduated
Jaden Jones	45	G/F	6'8"	220	RS Freshman	Dallas, TX	Declare for 2022 NBA draft
Luke Nathan	55	F/C	6'11"	240	GS Senior	Randolph, NJ	Walk-on; left the team for personal reasons

=== Incoming transfers ===
Name	Number	Pos.	Height	Weight	Year	Hometown	Previous college
Cam Spencer	10	G	6'4"	207	Senior	Davidsonville, MD	Loyola (MD)

=== Recruiting classes ===
==== 2022 recruiting class ====
College recruiting information
Name	Hometown	School	Height	Weight	Commit date
Derek Simpson #45 PG	Medford, NJ	Lenape High School	6 ft 2 in (1.88 m)	165 lb (75 kg)	Aug 8, 2021
Derek Simpson #45 PG	Recruit ratings: Rivals: 247Sports: ESPN: (79)				
Antonio Chol; PF	Saint Paul, MN	Minnesota Preparatory Academy	6 ft 8 in (2.03 m)	215 lb (98 kg)	Aug 1, 2022
Antonio Chol; PF	Recruit ratings: Rivals: 247Sports: ESPN: (NR)				
Antwone Woolfolk; PF	Cleveland, OH	Brush High School	6 ft 7 in (2.01 m)	250 lb (110 kg)	Oct 4, 2021
Antwone Woolfolk; PF	Recruit ratings: Rivals: 247Sports: ESPN: (NR)				
Overall recruit ranking:
Note: In many cases, Scout, Rivals, 247Sports, On3, and ESPN may conflict in their listings of height and weight.; In these cases, the average was taken. ESPN grades are on a 100-point scale.; Sources: "2022 Team Ranking". Rivals.

==== 2023 recruiting class ====
College recruiting information (2023)
Name	Hometown	School	Height	Weight	Commit date
Gavin Griffiths #8 PF	West Hartford, CT	Kingswood-Oxford Wyverns High School	6 ft 6 in (1.98 m)	175 lb (79 kg)	Jun 2, 2022
Gavin Griffiths #8 PF	Recruit ratings: Rivals: 247Sports: ESPN: (80)				
Overall recruit ranking:
Note: In many cases, Scout, Rivals, 247Sports, On3, and ESPN may conflict in their listings of height and weight.; In these cases, the average was taken. ESPN grades are on a 100-point scale.; Sources: "2023 Team Ranking". Rivals.

== Roster ==
2022–23 Rutgers Scarlet Knights men's basketball team
Players
Coaches

Pos.	#	Name	Height	Weight	Year	Previous school	Hometown
G	0	Derek Simpson	6 ft 3 in (1.91 m)	170 lb (77 kg)	Fr	Lenape	Mount Laurel, NJ
F	1	Oskar Palmquist	6 ft 8 in (2.03 m)	220 lb (100 kg)	RS Jr	Marks Gymnasieskola	Kinna, Sweden
G	2	Jalen Miller	6 ft 2 in (1.88 m)	200 lb (91 kg)	So	Bishop Walsh	Frederick, MD
F	3	Mawot Mag (injured)	6 ft 7 in (2.01 m)	216 lb (98 kg)	Jr	Prolific Prep	Melbourne, Australia
G	4	Paul Mulcahy	6 ft 6 in (1.98 m)	213 lb (97 kg)	Sr	Gill St. Bernard's	Bayonne, NJ
F	5	Aundre Hyatt	6 ft 6 in (1.98 m)	227 lb (103 kg)	RS Jr	Miller School; LSU	The Bronx, NY
G	10	Cam Spencer	6 ft 4 in (1.93 m)	207 lb (94 kg)	Sr	Boys' Latin School of Maryland; Loyola (MD)	Davidsonville, MD
C	11	Clifford Omoruyi	6 ft 11 in (2.11 m)	240 lb (109 kg)	Jr	Roselle Catholic	Benin City, Nigeria
F	13	Antwone Woolfolk	6 ft 9 in (2.06 m)	250 lb (113 kg)	Fr	Brush	Cleveland, OH
F	21	Dean Reiber	6 ft 10 in (2.08 m)	225 lb (102 kg)	Jr	Northwest Guilford	Greensboro, NC
G	22	Caleb McConnell	6 ft 7 in (2.01 m)	200 lb (91 kg)	RS Sr	SPIRE Academy	Jacksonville, FL
F	23	Andrew Fulin (W)	6 ft 6 in (1.98 m)	195 lb (88 kg)	Sr	Northern Valley Regional	Demarest, NJ
F	24	Antonio Chol	6 ft 9 in (2.06 m)	205 lb (93 kg)	Fr	Minnesota Preparatory Academy	Buffalo, NY
G	25	Aiden Terry (W)	5 ft 10 in (1.78 m)	160 lb (73 kg)	Jr	Bullitt Central	Mount Washington, KY
G	30	Logan Stephens (W)	6 ft 2 in (1.88 m)	197 lb (89 kg)	So	Woodward Academy	Decatur, GA

Head coach

- Steve Pikiell (Connecticut)

Assistant coach(es)

- Karl Hobbs (Connecticut)
- Brandin Knight (Pittsburgh)
- T. J. Thompson (George Washington)

Legend

- (C) Team captain
- (S) Suspended
- (I) Ineligible
- (W) Walk-on
- Injured
- Current redshirt

Roster

== Schedule and results ==
Date time, TV	Rank^{#}	Opponent^{#}	Result	Record	High points	High rebounds	High assists	Site (attendance) city, state
Regular season
November 7, 2022*; 7:00 p.m., BTN+		Columbia; Rutgers Multi-Team Event	W 75–35	1–0	17 – Spencer	10 – Hyatt	5 – Tied	Jersey Mike's Arena (8,000); Piscataway, NJ
November 10, 2022*; 7:00 p.m., BTN+		Sacred Heart; Rutgers Multi-Team Event	W 88–50	2–0	19 – Hyatt	7 – Tied	6 – Tied	Jersey Mike's Arena (8,000); Piscataway, NJ
November 12, 2022*; 2:00 p.m., BTN+		UMass Lowell; Rutgers Multi-Team Event	W 73–65	3–0	22 – Omoruyi	15 – Omoruyi	2 – Tied	Jersey Mike's Arena (8,000); Piscataway, NJ
November 18, 2022*; 5:00 p.m., ESPNU		vs. Temple; Basketball Hall of Fame Showcase	L 66–72	3–1	21 – Omuruyi	11 – Omoruyi	4 – Spencer	Mohegan Sun Arena; Uncasville, CT
November 22, 2022*; 7:00 p.m., BTN		Rider	W 76–46	4–1	20 – Omuruyi	10 – Omoruyi	4 – Simpson	Jersey Mike's Arena (8,000); Piscataway, NJ
November 26, 2022*; 3:00 p.m., BTN+		Central Connecticut	W 83–49	5–1	18 – Spencer	8 – Mag	5 – Spencer	Jersey Mike's Arena (8,000); Piscataway, NJ
November 30, 2022*; 7:15 p.m., ESPNU		at Miami (FL); ACC–Big Ten Challenge	L 61–68	5–2	16 – Tied	9 – Omoruyi	4 – Tied	Watsco Center (5,668); Coral Gables, FL
December 3, 2022; 4:00 p.m., BTN		No. 10 Indiana	W 63–48	6–2 (1–0)	16 – McConnell	10 – McConnell	4 – Mulcahy	Jersey Mike's Arena (8,000); Piscataway, NJ
December 8, 2022; 7:00 p.m., ESPN2		at No. 25 Ohio State	L 66–67	6–3 (1–1)	16 – Omoruyi	8 – Omoruyi	5 – Spencer	Value City Arena (14,042); Columbus, OH
December 11, 2022*; 6:30 p.m., FS1		Seton Hall; Rivalry/Garden State Hardwood Classic	L 43–45	6–4	9 – Hyatt	9 – Omoruyi	7 – Mulcahy	Jersey Mike's Arena (8,500); Piscataway, NJ
December 17, 2022*; 12:00 p.m., BTN		Wake Forest	W 81–57	7–4	15 – Spencer	9 – Omoruyi	7 – Mulcahy	Jersey Mike's Arena (8,000); Piscataway, NJ
December 23, 2022*; 5:00 p.m., BTN		Bucknell	W 85–50	8–4	17 – Omoruyi	14 – Omoruyi	7 – McConnell	Jersey Mike's Arena (8,000); Piscataway, NJ
December 30, 2022*; 8:00 p.m., BTN		Coppin State	W 90-57	9–4	20 – Omoruyi	13 – Omoruyi	8 – McConnell	Jersey Mike's Arena (8,000); Piscataway, NJ
January 2, 2023; 7:00 p.m., BTN		at No. 1 Purdue	W 65–64	10–4 (2–1)	16 – Mulcahy	8 – Mulcahy	6 – Mulcahy	Mackey Arena (14,876); West Lafayette, IN
January 5, 2023; 6:30 p.m., BTN		Maryland	W 64–50	11–4 (3–1)	15 – Mulcahy	13 – Omoruyi	5 – Spencer	Jersey Mike's Arena (8,000); Piscataway, NJ
January 8, 2023; 12:00 p.m., BTN		Iowa	L 65–76	11–5 (3–2)	13 – Spencer	9 – Omoruyi	4 – McConnell	Jersey Mike's Arena (8,000); Piscataway, NJ
January 11, 2023; 9:00 p.m., BTN		at Northwestern	W 65–62	12–5 (4–2)	23 – Spencer	11 – Omoruyi	6 – Mulcahy	Welsh–Ryan Arena (5,274); Evanston, IL
January 15, 2023; 2:15 p.m., BTN		Ohio State	W 68–64	13–5 (5–2)	21 – Spencer	11 – Omoruyi	6 – Spencer	Jersey Mike's Arena (8,000); Piscataway, NJ
January 19, 2023; 6:30 p.m., FS1	No. 23	at Michigan State	L 57–70	13–6 (5–3)	12 – Tied	12 – Omoruyi	5 – McConnell	Breslin Center (14,797); East Lansing, MI
January 24, 2023; 6:30 p.m., BTN		Penn State	W 65–45	14–6 (6–3)	16 – Omoruyi	10 – Omoruyi	6 – Mulcahy	Jersey Mike's Arena (8,038); Piscataway, NJ
January 29, 2023; 2:00 p.m., BTN		at Iowa	L 82–93	14–7 (6–4)	16 – Hyatt	8 – Omoruyi	13 – Mulcahy	Carver–Hawkeye Arena (13,907); Iowa City, IA
February 1, 2023; 8:30 p.m., BTN		Minnesota	W 90–55	15–7 (7–4)	17 – Spencer	7 – Omoruyi	9 – Mulcahy	Jersey Mike's Arena (8,000); Piscataway, NJ
February 4, 2023; 12:00 p.m., FOX		vs. Michigan State; B1G Super Saturday	W 61–55	16–7 (8–4)	17 – Mulcahy	12 – Omoruyi	3 – Tied	Madison Square Garden (14,844); New York, NY
February 7, 2022; 6:30 p.m., BTN	No. 24	at No. 18 Indiana	L 60–66	16–8 (8–5)	15 – Omoruyi	8 – McConnell	5 – Mulcahy	Simon Skjodt Assembly Hall (17,222); Bloomington, IN
February 11, 2023; 2:00 p.m., FS1	No. 24	at Illinois	L 60–69	16–9 (8–6)	14 – Tied	10 – Omoruyi	3 – Mconnell	State Farm Center (15,544); Champaign, IL
February 14, 2023; 8:00 p.m., BTN		Nebraska	L 72–82	16–10 (8–7)	24 – Hyatt	12 – Omoruyi	12 – Mulcahy	Jersey Mike's Arena (8,000); Piscataway, NJ
February 18, 2023; 2:00 p.m., BTN		at Wisconsin	W 58–57	17–10 (9–7)	22 – Spencer	9 – Hyatt	6 – Mulcahy	Kohl Center (17,071); Madison, WI
February 23, 2023; 8:30 p.m., FS1		Michigan	L 45–58	17–11 (9–8)	11 – Spencer	10 – Omoruyi	6 – Mulcahy	Jersey Mike's Arena (8,000); Piscataway, NJ
February 26, 2023; 6:30 p.m., BTN		at Penn State	W 59–56	18–11 (10–8)	16 – Simpson	13 – Omoruyi	12 – McConnell	Bryce Jordan Center (12,082); University Park, PA
March 2, 2023; 7:00 p.m., FS1		at Minnesota	L 74–75	18–12 (10–9)	23 – Omoruyi	11 – Omoruyi	6 – McConnell	Williams Arena (9,010); Minneapolis, MN
March 5, 2023; 7:30 p.m., BTN		Northwestern	L 53–65	18–13 (10–10)	14 – Omoruyi	8 – McConnell	4 – Mulcahy	Jersey Mike's Arena (8,000); Piscataway, NJ
Big Ten tournament
March 9, 2023; 12:00 p.m., BTN	(9)	vs. (8) Michigan; Second round	W 62–50	19–13	18 – Spencer	9 – McConnell	5 – Mulcahy	United Center; Chicago, IL
March 10, 2023; 12:00 p.m., BTN	(9)	vs. (1) No. 5 Purdue; Quarterfinals	L 65–70	19–14	18 – Simpson	8 – Omoruyi	5 – Mulcahy	United Center; Chicago, IL
NIT
March 14, 2023; 7:00 p.m., ESPNU	(1)	Hofstra; First round – Rutgers bracket	L 86–88 ^{OT}	19–15	22 – Spencer	8 – Spencer	5 – Tied	Jersey Mike's Arena (5,017); Piscataway, NJ
*Non-conference game. ^{#}Rankings from AP poll. (#) Tournament seedings in parentheses. All times are in Eastern Time.

== Rankings ==
Ranking movements Legend: ██ Increase in ranking ██ Decrease in ranking — = Not ranked RV = Received votes
	Week																			
Poll	Pre	1	2	3	4	5	6	7	8	9	10	11	12	13	14	15	16	17	18	Final
AP	RV	RV	—	RV	—	—	—	—	RV	RV	23	RV	RV	RV	24	RV				Not released
Coaches	RV	RV	—	—	RV	RV	RV	—	RV	RV	RV	RV	RV	RV	RV					
