= Andrew Funk =

American basketball player (born 1999)

Free Agent
- Position: Shooting guard

Personal information
- Born: September 21, 1999 (age 27) Warrington, Pennsylvania, U.S.
- Listed height: 6 ft 5 in (1.96 m)
- Listed weight: 200 lb (91 kg)

Career information
- High school: Archbishop Wood (Warminster, Pennsylvania)
- College: Bucknell (2018–2022); Penn State (2022–2023)
- NBA draft: 2023: undrafted
- Playing career: 2023–present

Career history
- 2023–2024: Grand Rapids Gold
- 2024: Chicago Bulls
- 2024: →Windy City Bulls
- 2024–2025: Grand Rapids Gold
- 2025–2026: Antwerp Giants

Career highlights
- Belgian League champion (2025–26); Belgian Cup champion (2026); Second-team All-Patriot League (2022)
- Stats at NBA.com
- Stats at Basketball Reference

Andrew David Funk (born September 21, 1999) is an American professional basketball player who last played for the Antwerp Giants of the BNXT League. He played college basketball for the Bucknell Bison and the Penn State Nittany Lions.

== High school career ==
Funk played at Archbishop Wood High School. As a junior, he scored in double figures eleven times and was named Sixth Man of the Year by the Philadelphia Inquirer while helping the Vikings go 28–3 and win their first Philadelphia Catholic League championship, as well as the Class 5A PIAA state championship and the District 12 title.

As a senior, Funk became a team captain and was chosen as the Philadelphia Catholic League Player of the Year, additionally being selected first-team All-PCL and second-team All-Southeast Pennsylvania.

== College career ==
Funk played his first four college basketball seasons for Bucknell and his final one at Penn State, finishing his career having totaled 1,693 points (11.5 ppg), 457 rebounds, 302 3-pointers and 237 assists. In his graduate season with the Nittany Lions, he averaged 12.5 points per game, had 25 games with double-digit scoring marks and posted eight games with 20-points, also having a career-high with 44.4 percent shooting from the field and 41.2% from the 3-point range. For his performance, Funk was named honorable mention All-Big Ten and was also elected to the Academic All-District team.

During Funk's first and only season at Penn State, the team compiled an overall record of 23–14 and reached the NCAA Tournament for the first time since 2011. Funk scored a team-high 27 points in Penn State's 76-59 first round victory over Texas A&M, the Nittany Lions' first NCAA Tournament victory since 2001.

== Professional career ==
=== Grand Rapids Gold (2023–2024) ===
After going undrafted in the 2023 NBA draft, Funk joined the Denver Nuggets for the 2023 NBA Summer League. On July 18, 2023, Funk signed with the Nuggets, but was waived on October 13. On October 30, he joined the Grand Rapids Gold. In 24 games with the Gold, Funk averaged 13.4 points, 3.4 rebounds and 3.5 assists per game.

=== Chicago / Windy City Bulls (2024) ===
On February 25, 2024, Funk signed a two-way contract with the Chicago Bulls. Funk made his NBA debut in a 126–111 loss to the Los Angeles Clippers on March 14, logging one minute. On July 24, he was waived by the Bulls after playing in five games without scoring.

=== Return to Grand Rapids (2024–2025) ===
On October 8, 2024, Funk signed with the Denver Nuggets, but was waived on October 16. On October 28, he rejoined the Grand Rapids Gold.

=== Antwerp Giants (2025–2026) ===
On July 25, 2025, he signed with Antwerp Giants of the BNXT League.

== Personal life ==
He is the son of Theresa and Albert Funk and has four brothers. He graduated with a bachelor's degree in business administration from Bucknell and earned a master's degree in management and organizational leadership at Penn State.

== Career statistics ==
Legend
GP	Games played	GS	Games started	MPG	Minutes per game
FG%	Field goal percentage	3P%	3-point field goal percentage	FT%	Free throw percentage
RPG	Rebounds per game	APG	Assists per game	SPG	Steals per game
BPG	Blocks per game	PPG	Points per game	**Bold**	Career high

=== NBA ===
Year	Team	GP	GS	MPG	FG%	3P%	FT%	RPG	APG	SPG	BPG	PPG
2023–24	Chicago	5	0	2.7	.000	.000	—	.0	.0	.2	.2	.0
Career		5	0	2.7	.000	.000	—	.0	.0	.2	.2	.0

=== College ===
Year	Team	GP	GS	MPG	FG%	3P%	FT%	RPG	APG	SPG	BPG	PPG
2018–19	Bucknell	33	0	14.3	.407	.347	.667	1.5	.7	.3	.0	4.7
2019–20	Bucknell	33	32	32.6	.391	.302	.706	3.9	1.7	**.8**	.2	10.8
2020–21	Bucknell	12	12	33.8	.411	.269	.854	**4.3**	1.5	**.8**	.1	12.9
2021–22	Bucknell	32	32	**36.6**	.432	.363	.761	3.6	**3.0**	**.8**	**.3**	**17.6**
2022–23	Penn State	**37**	**37**	34.5	**.444**	**.412**	**.867**	3.0	1.1	.5	.1	12.5
Career		147	113	29.9	.421	.357	.784	3.1	1.6	.6	.1	11.5
