= 2022–23 Maryland Terrapins men's basketball team =

American college basketball season

2022–23 Maryland Terrapins men's basketball
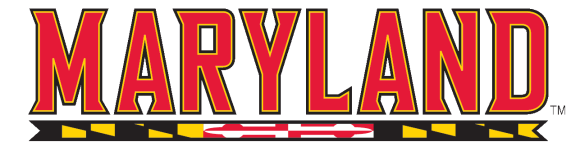

Hall of Fame Tip Off Champions

NCAA tournament, Second Round
- Conference: Big Ten Conference
- Record: 22–13 (11–9 Big Ten)
- Head coach: Kevin Willard (1st season)
- Assistant coaches: Tony Skinn; David Cox; Grant Billmeier
- Home arena: Xfinity Center

2022–23 Big Ten Conference men's basketball standings
	Conf.				Overall
Team	W		L	PCT	W		L	PCT
No. 3 Purdue †	15	–	5	.750	29	–	6	.829
No. 21 Indiana	12	–	8	.600	23	–	12	.657
Northwestern	12	–	8	.600	22	–	12	.647
Michigan State	11	–	8	.579	21	–	13	.618
Maryland	11	–	9	.550	22	–	13	.629
Illinois	11	–	9	.550	20	–	13	.606
Iowa	11	–	9	.550	19	–	14	.576
Michigan	11	–	9	.550	18	–	16	.529
Penn State	10	–	10	.500	23	–	14	.622
Rutgers	10	–	10	.500	19	–	15	.559
Wisconsin	9	–	11	.450	20	–	15	.571
Nebraska	9	–	11	.450	16	–	16	.500
Ohio State	5	–	15	.250	16	–	19	.457
Minnesota	2	–	17	.105	9	–	22	.290
† Conference tournament winner Rankings from AP poll

The 2022–23 Maryland Terrapins men's basketball team represented the University of Maryland, College Park in the 2022–23 NCAA Division I men's basketball season. They were led by first-year head coach Kevin Willard. They played their home games at Xfinity Center in College Park, Maryland, as members of the Big Ten Conference.

With a new head coach and coming off their first losing season in 29 years, the bar for this group was quite low. However, thanks to a dominant 8–0 start, dominating wins over Miami and Saint Louis, and a home win against a ranked conference foe Illinois, they reached as high as #13 in the AP poll. They did suffer some lopsided losses but played exceptionally well at home; they were the only team in the Big Ten to have a perfect home record in the conference, where they finished 11–9 in a 3-way tie for fifth place. They earned an 8-seed in the NCAA tournament and beat West Virginia in the first round before falling to overall number 1 seed Alabama.

== Previous season ==
The Terrapins finished the 2021–22 season 15–17, 7–13 in Big Ten play to finish in a three-way tie for 10th place. As the No. 10 seed in the Big Ten tournament, they lost to Michigan State in the second round.

On December 3, 2021, head coach Mark Turgeon and the school announced that the parties had mutually agreed that Turgeon would step down as head coach effective immediately. Danny Manning, who had been hired as an assistant prior to the season, was named the interim head coach for the remainder of the season. On March 21, 2022, the school named Seton Hall head coach Kevin Willard the team's new head coach.

== Offseason ==
=== Player departures ===
Name	Num	Pos.	Height	Weight	Year	Hometown	Reason for departure
Marcus Dockery	0	G	6'2"	180	Sophomore	Washington, D.C.	Transferred to Howard
James Graham III	1	G/F	6'8"	205	Sophomore	Milwaukee, WI	Midseason transferred to Missouri State
Fatts Russell	4	G	5'11"	165	GS Senior	Philadelphia, PA	Graduated/signed to play professionally with KK Mornar Bar
Eric Ayala	5	G	6'5"	205	Senior	Wilmington, DE	Graduated/signed to play professionally with Atléticos de San Germán
Xavier Green	11	G	6'6"	205	GS Senior	Williamsburg, VA	Graduated
Aidan McCool	14	G	6'3"	165	Sophomore	Charleston, SC	Walk-on; left the team for personal reasons
Simon Wright	15	F	6'7"	225	GS Senior	Minneapolis, MN	Walk-on; graduated
Qudus Wahab	33	C	6'11"	240	Junior	Lagos, Nigeria	Transferred to Georgetown

=== Incoming transfers ===
Name	Num	Pos.	Height	Weight	Year	Hometown	Transfer From
Donald Carey	0	G	6'5"	187	GS Senior	Upper Marlboro, MD	Georgetown
Jahmir Young	1	G	6'1"	185	Senior	Upper Marlboro, MD	Charlotte
Patrick Emilien	15	F	6'7"	210	GS Senior	Toronto, ON	St. Francis (NY)
Jahari Long	25	G	6'5"	200	Junior	Houston, TX	Seton Hall

=== Recruiting classes ===
==== 2022 recruiting class ====
College recruiting
Name	Hometown	School	Height	Weight	Commit date
Noah Batchelor #35 SF	Ellicott City, MD	IMG Academy	6 ft 7 in (2.01 m)	190 lb (86 kg)	Apr 18, 2022
Noah Batchelor #35 SF	Recruit ratings: Scout: Rivals: 247Sports: ESPN: (80)				
Caelum Swanton-Rodger; C	Calgary, AB	Edge Prep H.S.	6 ft 11 in (2.11 m)	N/A	May 9, 2022
Caelum Swanton-Rodger; C	Recruit ratings: Scout: Rivals: 247Sports: ESPN: (NR)				
Overall recruit ranking:
Note: In many cases, Scout, Rivals, 247Sports, On3, and ESPN may conflict in their listings of height and weight.; In these cases, the average was taken. ESPN grades are on a 100-point scale.; Sources: "2022 Maryland Commits". Rivals.; "2022 Team Ranking". Rivals.

==== 2023 recruiting class ====
College recruiting (2023)
Name	Hometown	School	Height	Weight	Commit date
DeShawn Harris-Smith #13 SF	Fairfax, VA	Paul VI High School	6 ft 5 in (1.96 m)	190 lb (86 kg)	Aug 27, 2022
DeShawn Harris-Smith #13 SF	Recruit ratings: Scout: Rivals: 247Sports: ESPN: (85)				
Jamie Kaiser #27 SF	Alexandria, VA	IMG Academy	6 ft 5 in (1.96 m)	200 lb (91 kg)	Aug 7, 2022
Jamie Kaiser #27 SF	Recruit ratings: Scout: Rivals: 247Sports: ESPN: (81)				
Jahnathan Lamothe #41 SG	Baltimore, MD	St. Frances Academy	6 ft 2 in (1.88 m)	185 lb (84 kg)	Jun 5, 2022
Jahnathan Lamothe #41 SG	Recruit ratings: Scout: Rivals: 247Sports: ESPN: (79)				
Overall recruit ranking:
Note: In many cases, Scout, Rivals, 247Sports, On3, and ESPN may conflict in their listings of height and weight.; In these cases, the average was taken. ESPN grades are on a 100-point scale.; Sources: "2023 Maryland Commits". Rivals.; "2023 Team Ranking". Rivals.

== Roster ==
2022–23 Maryland Terrapins men's basketball team
Players
Coaches

Pos.	#	Name	Height	Weight	Year	Previous school	Hometown
G	0	Don Carey	6 ft 5 in (1.96 m)	187 lb (85 kg)	GS	Frederick Douglass HS; Georgetown	Upper Marlboro, Maryland
G	1	Jahmir Young	6 ft 1 in (1.85 m)	185 lb (84 kg)	Sr	DeMatha Catholic HS; Charlotte	Upper Marlboro, Maryland
F	10	Julian Reese	6 ft 9 in (2.06 m)	230 lb (104 kg)	So	St. Frances Academy	Baltimore, Maryland
G/F	11	Noah Batchelor	6 ft 6 in (1.98 m)	185 lb (84 kg)	Fr	Glenelg Country School	Frederick, Maryland
F	12	Pavlo Dziuba	6 ft 8 in (2.03 m)	235 lb (107 kg)	Jr	Basquet; Arizona State	Kyiv, Ukraine
G	13	Hakim Hart	6 ft 8 in (2.03 m)	205 lb (93 kg)	Sr	Roman Catholic HS	Philadelphia, Pennsylvania
F	15	Patrick Emilien	6 ft 7 in (2.01 m)	210 lb (95 kg)	GS	John Polanyi Collegiate Institute; St. Francis (NY)	Toronto, Ontario
G/F	20	Ike Cornish	6 ft 6 in (1.98 m)	190 lb (86 kg)	So	Legacy Charter	Baltimore, Maryland
G	23	Ian Martinez	6 ft 3 in (1.91 m)	185 lb (84 kg)	Jr	Junípero Serra Catholic HS; Utah	Heredia, Costa Rica
F	24	Donta Scott	6 ft 8 in (2.03 m)	230 lb (104 kg)	Sr	Imhotep Charter HS	Philadelphia, Pennsylvania
G	25	Jahari Long	6 ft 5 in (1.96 m)	200 lb (91 kg)	Jr	Episcopal HS; Seton Hall	Houston, Texas
F	31	Arnaud Revaz	6 ft 10 in (2.08 m)	230 lb (104 kg)	Jr	Bourg-en-Brasse Acadamie	Sion, Switzerland
G	32	Brett Karkus (W)	6 ft 4 in (1.93 m)	185 lb (84 kg)	So	Berkshire School	Hewlett, New York
G	30	Carson Dick (W)	6 ft 2 in (1.88 m)	175 lb (79 kg)	Jr	Howard Community College	Glenelg, Maryland
C	35	Caelum Swanton-Rodger	6 ft 11 in (2.11 m)	220 lb (100 kg)	Fr	Edge School	Calgary, Alberta
G	40	RJ Floyd (W)	6 ft 3 in (1.91 m)	165 lb (75 kg)	So	Dr. Henry A. Wise Jr. High School	Upper Marlboro, Maryland

Head coach

- Kevin Willard (Pittsburgh)

Assistant coach(es)

- Tony Skinn (George Mason)
- David Cox (William & Mary)
- Grant Billmeier (Seton Hall)

Legend

- (C) Team captain
- (S) Suspended
- (I) Ineligible
- (W) Walk-on
- Injured
- Current redshirt

Roster

=== Depth chart ===
Pos.	Starting 5	Bench 1	Bench 2
C	Julian Reese	Caelum Swanton-Rodger	Arnaud Revaz
PF	Donta Scott	Patrick Emilien	Pavlo Dziuba
SF	Hakim Hart	Noah Batchelor
SG	Don Carey	Ian Martinez	Ike Cornish
PG	Jahmir Young	Jahari Long

== Schedule and results ==
Date time, TV	Rank^{#}	Opponent^{#}	Result	Record	High points	High rebounds	High assists	Site (attendance) city, state
Regular season
November 7, 2022*; 7:00 p.m., BTN+		Niagara	W 71–49	1–0	18 – Scott	7 – Tied	4 – Young	Xfinity Center (10,715); College Park, MD
November 10, 2022*; 7:00 p.m., BTN+		Western Carolina	W 71–51	2–0	19 – Reese	12 – Reese	2 – Tied	Xfinity Center (10,528); College Park, MD
November 15, 2022*; 7:00 p.m., BTN		Binghamton	W 76–52	3–0	19 – Reese	9 – Scott	5 – Young	Xfinity Center (10,349); College Park, MD
November 19, 2022*; 1:00 p.m., ESPNews		vs. Saint Louis; Hall of Fame Tip Off semifinals	W 95–67	4–0	25 – Scott	7 – Emilien	4 – Long	Mohegan Sun Arena; Uncasville, CT
November 20, 2022*; 1:00 p.m., ESPN		vs. Miami (FL); Hall of Fame Tip Off championship	W 88–70	5–0	24 – Scott	8 – Scott	3 – Tied	Mohegan Sun Arena; Uncasville, CT
November 25, 2022*; 4:00 p.m., BTN+	No. 23	Coppin State	W 95–79	6–0	24 – Reese	10 – Reese	5 – Young	Xfinity Center (10,902); College Park, MD
November 29, 2022*; 7:00 p.m., ESPN2	No. 22	at Louisville; ACC–Big Ten Challenge	W 79–54	7–0	18 – Scott	7 – Reese	5 – Young	KFC Yum! Center (12,211); Louisville, KY
December 2, 2022; 9:00 p.m., BTN	No. 22	No. 16 Illinois	W 71–66	8–0 (1–0)	24 – Young	7 – Reese	3 – Scott	Xfinity Center (16,380); College Park, MD
December 6, 2022; 9:00 p.m., ESPN2	No. 13	at Wisconsin	L 59–64	8–1 (1–1)	17 – Young	10 – Scott	2 – Tied	Kohl Center; Madison, WI
December 11, 2022*; 4:30 p.m., FS1	No. 13	vs. No. 7 Tennessee; Basketball Hall of Fame Invitational	L 53–56	8–2	18 – Young	8 – Tied	7 – Young	Barclays Center; Brooklyn, NY
December 14, 2022*; 9:00 p.m., FS1	No. 20	No. 16 UCLA	L 60–87	8–3	16 – Martinez	6 – Tied	3 – Long	Xfinity Center (16,625); College Park, MD
December 22, 2022*; 6:30 p.m., BTN		Saint Peter's	W 75–45	9–3	20 – Hart	8 – Carey	4 – Tied	Xfinity Center (11,636); College Park, MD
December 29, 2022*; 7:00 p.m., ESPNU		UMBC	W 80–64	10–3	19 – Carey	9 – Scott	2 – Tied	Xfinity Center (13,522); College Park, MD
January 1, 2023; 4:30 p.m., FS1		at Michigan	L 46–81	10–4 (1–2)	9 – Long	5 – Tied	4 – Carey	Crisler Center (12,176); Ann Arbor, MI
January 5, 2023; 6:30 p.m., BTN		at Rutgers	L 50–64	10–5 (1–3)	13 – Young	7 – Martinez	3 – Young	Jersey Mike's Arena (8,000); Piscataway, NJ
January 8, 2023; 1:00 p.m., ESPN		No. 24 Ohio State	W 80–73	11–5 (2–3)	30 – Young	11 – Young	3 – Reese	Xfinity Center (12,497); College Park, MD
January 15, 2023; 4:30 p.m., BTN		at Iowa	L 67–81	11–6 (2–4)	20 – Young	6 – Reese	3 – Young	Carver–Hawkeye Arena (13,376); Iowa City, IA
January 19, 2023; 7:00 p.m., ESPN		Michigan	W 64–58	12–6 (3–4)	26 – Young	9 – Reese	3 – Scott	Xfinity Center (12,656); College Park, MD
January 22, 2023; 1:00 p.m., FS1		at No. 3 Purdue	L 55–58	12–7 (3–5)	19 – Reese	7 – Young	7 – Young	Mackey Arena (14,876); West Lafayette, IN
January 25, 2023; 7:00 p.m., BTN		Wisconsin	W 73–55	13–7 (4–5)	22 – Young	11 – Scott	8 – Hart	Xfinity Center (14,407); College Park, MD
January 28, 2023; 4:30 p.m., BTN		Nebraska	W 82–63	14–7 (5–5)	18 – Young	7 – Emilien	7 – Young	Xfinity Center (15,864); College Park, MD
January 31, 2023; 9:00 p.m., ESPN2		No. 21 Indiana	W 66–55	15–7 (6–5)	20 – Young	11 – Reese	2 – Hart	Xfinity Center (14,583); College Park, MD
February 4, 2023; 9:00 p.m., BTN		at Minnesota	W 81–46	16–7 (7–5)	16 – Reese	6 – Scott	4 – Tied	Williams Arena (9,255); Minneapolis, MN
February 7, 2023; 9:00 p.m., ESPN2		at Michigan State	L 58–63	16–8 (7–6)	17 – Young	6 – Tied	6 – Young	Breslin Center (14,797); East Lansing, MI
February 11, 2023; 12:00 p.m., BTN		Penn State	W 74–68	17–8 (8–6)	23 – Hart	10 – Scott	4 – Tied	Xfinity Center (17,950); College Park, MD
February 16, 2023; 6:30 p.m., BTN		No. 3 Purdue	W 68–54	18–8 (9–6)	20 – Young	9 – Reese	4 – Tied	Xfinity Center (17,950); College Park, MD
February 19, 2023; 5:00 p.m., FS1		at Nebraska	L 66–70	18–9 (9–7)	16 – Tied	16 – Reese	6 – Young	Pinnacle Bank Arena (15,395); Lincoln, NE
February 22, 2023; 7:00 p.m., BTN		Minnesota	W 88–70	19–9 (10–7)	21 – Reese	12 – Reese	6 – Hart	Xfinity Center (14,263); College Park, MD
February 26, 2023; 12:00 p.m., BTN		No. 21 Northwestern	W 75–59	20–9 (11–7)	18 – Young	10 – Reese	7 – Hart	Xfinity Center (17,950); College Park, MD
March 1, 2023; 7:00 p.m., BTN	No. 21	at Ohio State	L 62–73	20–10 (11–8)	17 – Reese	12 – Reese	2 – Tied	Value City Arena (11,799); Columbus, OH
March 5, 2023; 12:00 p.m., BTN	No. 21	at Penn State	L 64–65	20–11 (11–9)	26 – Young	8 – Young	2 – Tied	Bryce Jordan Center (10,672); University Park, PA
Big Ten tournament
March 9, 2023; 9:00 p.m., BTN	(6)	vs. (14) Minnesota; Second Round	W 70–54	21–11	20 – Scott	8 – Tied	3 – Tied	United Center (16,104); Chicago, IL
March 10, 2023; 9:00 p.m., BTN	(6)	vs. (3) No. 19 Indiana; Quarterfinals	L 60–70	21–12	16 – Hart	7 – Reese	4 – Tied	United Center (18,892); Chicago, IL
NCAA tournament
March 16, 2023*; 12:15 pm, CBS	(8 S)	vs. (9 S) West Virginia; First Round	W 67–65	22–12	17 – Reese	9 – Reese	3 – Hart	Legacy Arena (15,126); Birmingham, AL
March 18, 2023*; 9:40 p.m., TBS	(8 S)	vs. (1 S) No. 1 Alabama; Second Round	L 51–73	22–13	14 – Reese	7 – Scott	3 – Hart	Legacy Arena (15,198); Birmingham, AL
*Non-conference game. ^{#}Rankings from AP Poll. (#) Tournament seedings in parentheses. S=South. All times are in Eastern Time.

== Rankings ==
Ranking movements Legend: ██ Increase in ranking ██ Decrease in ranking — = Not ranked RV = Received votes
	Week																				
Poll	Pre	1	2	3	4	5	6	7	8	9	10	11	12	13	14	15	16	17	18	19	Final
AP	—	—	23	22	13	20	RV	RV	—	—	—	—	—	—	RV	RV	RV	21	RV	—	N/A
Coaches	—	—	25	22	13	17	23	21	RV	RV	RV	—	—	—	RV	RV	RV	24	RV	RV	RV

*AP does not release post-NCAA Tournament rankings.
