= 2022–23 Minnesota Golden Gophers men's basketball team =

Basketball team

2022–23 Minnesota Golden Gophers men's basketball
- Conference: Big Ten Conference
- Record: 9–22 (2–17 Big Ten)
- Head coach: Ben Johnson (2nd season)
- Assistant coaches: Dave Thorson (2nd season); Jason Kemp (2nd season); Marcus Jenkins (2nd season)
- Home arena: Williams Arena

2022–23 Big Ten Conference men's basketball standings
	Conf.				Overall
Team	W		L	PCT	W		L	PCT
No. 3 Purdue †	15	–	5	.750	29	–	6	.829
No. 21 Indiana	12	–	8	.600	23	–	12	.657
Northwestern	12	–	8	.600	22	–	12	.647
Michigan State	11	–	8	.579	21	–	13	.618
Maryland	11	–	9	.550	22	–	13	.629
Illinois	11	–	9	.550	20	–	13	.606
Iowa	11	–	9	.550	19	–	14	.576
Michigan	11	–	9	.550	18	–	16	.529
Penn State	10	–	10	.500	23	–	14	.622
Rutgers	10	–	10	.500	19	–	15	.559
Wisconsin	9	–	11	.450	20	–	15	.571
Nebraska	9	–	11	.450	16	–	16	.500
Ohio State	5	–	15	.250	16	–	19	.457
Minnesota	2	–	17	.105	9	–	22	.290
† Conference tournament winner Rankings from AP poll

The 2022–23 Minnesota Golden Gophers men's basketball team represented the University of Minnesota in the 2022–23 NCAA Division I men's basketball season. The Gophers were led by second-year head coach Ben Johnson and played their home games at Williams Arena in Minneapolis, Minnesota as members of the Big Ten Conference. They finished the season 9–22, 2–17 in Big Ten play to finish in last place. They defeated Nebraska in the first round of the Big Ten tournament before losing to Maryland in the second round.

== Previous season ==
The Gophers finished the 2021–22 season 13–17, 4–16 in Big Ten play to finish in a tie for last place. The team was almost entirely remade from the prior season, with 10 players transferring out of the program following the firing of former head coach Richard Pitino.

The Gophers began the season well, compiling a 10–1 record to begin the season, including the team's first road win against Michigan in Ann Arbor since 2011. The Gophers were unable to continue that success as the season wore on, losing 16 of their final 19 games and finishing the season with a 60–51 loss to Penn State in the first round of the Big Ten tournament.

== Offseason ==
=== Departures ===
Name	Number	Pos.	Height	Weight	Year	Hometown	Reason for departure
Payton Willis	0	G	6'4"	200	Graduate Student	Fayetteville, AR	Graduated
Eric Curry	1	F	6'9"	240	RS Senior	Memphis, TN	Graduated
Abdoulaye Thiam	2	G	6'3"	180	Freshman	Orlando, FL	Transferred to High Point
Joey Kern	3	G	6'1"	170	Graduate Student	Norwalk, IA	Walk-on; graduated
Luke Loewe	12	G	6'4"	185	Graduate Student	Fond du Lac, WI	Graduated
Charlie Daniels	15	F/C	6'9"	230	Graduate Student	Jacksonville, FL	Graduated
Eylijah Stephens	20	G	6'3"	175	Graduate Student	Plantation, FL	Graduated
Danny Ogele	22	F	6'7"	220	Graduate Student	Chicago, IL	Graduated
Sean Sutherlin	24	G	6'5"	200	RS Senior	New Brighton, MN	Graduated

=== Incoming transfers ===
Name	Number	Pos.	Height	Weight	Year	Hometown	Previous School
Taurus Samuels	0	G	6'1"	190	Graduate Student	Oceanside, CA	Dartmouth
Dawson Garcia	3	F	6'11"	235	Sophomore	Prior Lake, MN	North Carolina
Ta'Lon Cooper	55	G	6'4"	190	Junior	Roebuck, SC	Morehead State

=== Recruiting classes ===
==== 2022 recruiting class ====
College recruiting
Name	Hometown	School	Height	Weight	Commit date
Braeden Carrington; SG	Brooklyn Park, MN	Park Center High School	6 ft 3 in (1.91 m)	170 lb (77 kg)	Aug 4, 2021
Braeden Carrington; SG	Recruit ratings: Rivals: 247Sports: ESPN: (80)				
Pharrel Payne; PF	Cottage Grove, MN	Park Senior High School	6 ft 9 in (2.06 m)	230 lb (100 kg)	Aug 22, 2021
Pharrel Payne; PF	Recruit ratings: Rivals: 247Sports: ESPN: (75)				
Joshua Ola-Joseph; PF	Osseo, MN	Osseo Senior High School	6 ft 6 in (1.98 m)	200 lb (91 kg)	Aug 30, 2021
Joshua Ola-Joseph; PF	Recruit ratings: Rivals: 247Sports: ESPN: (75)				
Jaden Henley; SF	Ontario, CA	Colony High School	6 ft 7 in (2.01 m)	190 lb (86 kg)	Dec 10, 2021
Jaden Henley; SF	Recruit ratings: Rivals: 247Sports:				
Kadyn Betts; SF	Pueblo, CO	Central High School	6 ft 8 in (2.03 m)	190 lb (86 kg)	Jul 1, 2022
Kadyn Betts; SF	Recruit ratings: Rivals: 247Sports:				
Overall recruit ranking: Rivals: 48 247Sports: 35
Note: In many cases, Scout, Rivals, 247Sports, On3, and ESPN may conflict in their listings of height and weight.; In these cases, the average was taken. ESPN grades are on a 100-point scale.; Sources: "2022 Team Ranking". Rivals.

==== 2023 Recruiting class ====
College recruiting (2023)
Name	Hometown	School	Height	Weight	Commit date
Cam Christie; SG	Rolling Meadows, IL	Rolling Meadows High School	6 ft 5 in (1.96 m)	160 lb (73 kg)	Jul 29, 2022
Cam Christie; SG	Recruit ratings: Rivals: 247Sports: ESPN:				
Overall recruit ranking:
Note: In many cases, Scout, Rivals, 247Sports, On3, and ESPN may conflict in their listings of height and weight.; In these cases, the average was taken. ESPN grades are on a 100-point scale.; Sources: "2023 Team Ranking". Rivals.

== Roster ==
2022–23 Minnesota Golden Gophers men's basketball team
Players
Coaches

Pos.	#	Name	Height	Weight	Year	Previous school	Hometown
G	0	Taurus Samuels	6 ft 1 in (1.85 m)	195 lb (88 kg)	GS	Vista; Dartmouth	Oceanside, CA
F	1	Joshua Ola-Joseph	6 ft 7 in (2.01 m)	215 lb (98 kg)	Fr	Compass Prep	Brooklyn Park, MN
F	3	Dawson Garcia	6 ft 11 in (2.11 m)	235 lb (107 kg)	So	Prior Lake; North Carolina	Prior Lake, MN
G	4	Braeden Carrington	6 ft 4 in (1.93 m)	195 lb (88 kg)	Fr	Park Center	Brooklyn Park, MN
F	5	Isaiah Ihnen (injured)	6 ft 10 in (2.08 m)	220 lb (100 kg)	RS Jr	IBA Munich	Böblingen, Germany
F	10	Jamison Battle	6 ft 7 in (2.01 m)	220 lb (100 kg)	Jr	DeLaSalle; George Washington	Robbinsdale, MN
G	11	Jackson Purcell (W)	6 ft 5 in (1.96 m)	195 lb (88 kg)	RS Fr	Eastview	Apple Valley, MN
F	15	Kadyn Betts (redshirt)	6 ft 8 in (2.03 m)	215 lb (98 kg)	Fr	Central	Pueblo, CO
F	21	Pharrel Payne	6 ft 9 in (2.06 m)	255 lb (116 kg)	Fr	Park	Cottage Grove, MN
F	23	Parker Fox (injured)	6 ft 8 in (2.03 m)	210 lb (95 kg)	RS Jr	Mahtomedi; Northern State	Mahtomedi, MN
G/F	24	Jaden Henley	6 ft 7 in (2.01 m)	200 lb (91 kg)	Fr	Colony	Ontario, CA
G	25	Will Ramberg (W)	6 ft 5 in (1.96 m)	205 lb (93 kg)	Jr	Cook County; McGill	Grand Marais, MN
C	42	Treyton Thompson	7 ft 0 in (2.13 m)	210 lb (95 kg)	So	La Lumiere School	Glenwood, MN
G	55	Ta'Lon Cooper	6 ft 4 in (1.93 m)	195 lb (88 kg)	Jr	Dorman; Morehead State	Roebuck, SC

Head coach

- Ben Johnson (Minnesota)

Assistant coach(es)

- Dave Thorson (Hamline)
- Jason Kemp (UW–La Crosse)
- Marcus Jenkins (Air Force)

Legend

- (C) Team captain
- (S) Suspended
- (I) Ineligible
- (W) Walk-on
- Injured
- Current redshirt

Roster

== Schedule and results ==
Date time, TV	Rank^{#}	Opponent^{#}	Result	Record	High points	High rebounds	High assists	Site (attendance) city, state
Exhibition
November 2, 2022*; 7:00 p.m., BTN+		St. Olaf	W 71–55		14 – Ola-Joseph	9 – Thompson	5 – Cooper	Williams Arena (8,869); Minneapolis, MN
Regular season
November 7, 2022*; 8:00 p.m., BTN+		Western Michigan	W 61–60	1–0	23 – Garcia	8 – Tied	10 – Cooper	Williams Arena (8,119); Minneapolis, MN
November 11, 2022*; 6:00 p.m., BTN+		St. Francis Brooklyn	W 72–54	2–0	16 – Henley	8 – Tied	6 – Cooper	Williams Arena (8,232); Minneapolis, MN
November 14, 2022*; 6:00 p.m., BTN		DePaul; Gavitt Tipoff Games	L 53–69	2–1	19 – Garcia	6 – Garcia	6 – Cooper	Williams Arena (8,426); Minneapolis, MN
November 17, 2022*; 8:00 p.m., BTN		Central Michigan; SoCal Challenge campus-site game	W 68–60	3–1	17 – Garcia	7 – Tied	8 – Cooper	Williams Arena (8,096); Minneapolis, MN
November 21, 2022*; 9:30 p.m., CBSSN		vs. Cal Baptist; SoCal Challenge Surf Division semifinals	W 62–61 ^{OT}	4–1	15 – Payne	13 – Payne	7 – Cooper	The Pavilion at JSerra (900); San Juan Capistrano, CA
November 23, 2022*; 9:30 p.m., CBSSN		vs. UNLV; SoCal Challenge Surf Division championship	L 62–71	4–2	17 – Battle	9 – Battle	7 – Cooper	The Pavilion at JSerra; San Juan Capistrano, CA
November 28, 2022*; 6:00 p.m., ESPN2		at Virginia Tech; ACC–Big Ten Challenge	L 57–67	4–3	13 – Tied	6 – Payne	5 – Cooper	Cassell Coliseum (7,870); Blacksburg, VA
December 4, 2022; 4:00 p.m., BTN		at No. 5 Purdue	L 70–89	4–4 (0–1)	21 – Battle	6 – Carrington	8 – Cooper	Mackey Arena (14,876); West Lafayette, IN
December 8, 2022; 8:00 p.m., BTN		Michigan	L 75–90	4–5 (0–2)	16 – Cooper	5 – Tied	5 – Cooper	Williams Arena (10,004); Minneapolis, MN
December 11, 2022*; 7:30 p.m., BTN		No. 23 Mississippi State	L 51–69	4–6	20 – Garcia	10 – Carrington	4 – Cooper	Williams Arena (8,664); Minneapolis, MN
December 14, 2022*; 7:00 p.m., BTN		Arkansas–Pine Bluff	W 72–56	5–6	20 – Carrington	7 – Garcia	8 – Cooper	Williams Arena (8,127); Minneapolis, MN
December 22, 2022*; 12:00 p.m., BTN+		Chicago State	W 58–55	6–6	18 – Garcia	7 – Carrington	9 – Cooper	Williams Arena (8,736); Minneapolis, MN
December 29, 2022*; 7:00 p.m., BTN+		Alcorn State	Canceled due to travel complications at Alcorn State					Williams Arena; Minneapolis, MN
January 3, 2023; 8:00 p.m., BTN		at No. 14 Wisconsin	L 60–63	6–7 (0–3)	16 – Cooper	9 – Tied	3 – Cooper	Kohl Center (13,850); Madison, WI
January 7, 2023; 11:00 a.m., BTN		Nebraska	L 79–81 ^{OT}	6–8 (0–4)	20 – Battle	15 – Garcia	4 – Cooper	Williams Arena (10,948); Minneapolis, MN
January 12, 2023; 5:30 p.m., FS1		at Ohio State	W 70–67	7–8 (1–4)	28 – Garcia	11 – Cooper	4 – Cooper	Value City Arena (11,202); Columbus, OH
January 16, 2023; 5:00 p.m., BTN		Illinois	L 60–78	7–9 (1–5)	17 – Garcia	7 – Payne	4 – Tied	Williams Arena (9,874); Minneapolis, MN
January 19, 2023; 6:00 p.m., ESPN2		No. 3 Purdue	L 39–61	7–10 (1–6)	13 – Ola–Joseph	6 – Tied	2 – Tied	Williams Arena (9,251); Minneapolis, MN
January 22, 2023; 12:00 p.m., BTN		at Michigan	L 56–60	7–11 (1–7)	15 – Cooper	10 – Cooper	3 – Tied	Crisler Center (12,092); Ann Arbor, MI
January 25, 2023; 8:00 p.m., BTN		Indiana	L 57–61	7–12 (1–8)	20 – Battle	8 – Thompson	6 – Cooper	Williams Arena (9,276); Minneapolis, MN
January 28, 2023; 11:00 a.m., BTN		at Northwestern	L 61–81	7–13 (1–9)	20 – Battle	7 – Ramberg	5 – Cooper	Welsh–Ryan Arena (6,064); Evanston, IL
February 1, 2023; 7:30 p.m., BTN		at Rutgers	L 55–90	7–14 (1–10)	17 – Ola-Joseph	9 – Cooper	7 – Cooper	Jersey Mike's Arena (8,000); Piscataway, NJ
February 4, 2023; 8:00 p.m., BTN		Maryland	L 46–81	7–15 (1–11)	14 – Payne	7 – Henley	4 – Tied	Williams Arena (9,255); Minneapolis, MN
February 12, 2023; 12:00 p.m., FS1		Iowa	L 56–68	7–16 (1–12)	11 – Ola-Joseph	7 – Tied	7 – Cooper	Williams Arena (10,683); Minneapolis, MN
February 15, 2023; 6:00 p.m., BTN		at Michigan State	Canceled due to shooting at Michigan State					Breslin Center; East Lansing, MI
February 18, 2023; 6:00 p.m., BTN		Penn State	L 69–76	7–17 (1–13)	23 – Garcia	10 – Payne	8 – Cooper	Williams Arena (11,693); Minneapolis, MN
February 20, 2023; 8:00 p.m., BTN		at Illinois; Rescheduled from February 7	L 69–78	7–18 (1–14)	31 – Battle	8 – Garcia	6 – Cooper	State Farm Center (15,544); Champaign, IL
February 22, 2023; 6:00 p.m., BTN		at Maryland	L 70–88	7–19 (1–15)	17 – Payne	8 – Garcia	8 – Cooper	Xfinity Center (14,263); College Park, MD
February 25, 2023; 2:30 p.m., BTN		at Nebraska	L 67–78	7–20 (1–16)	12 – Tied	14 – Garcia	6 – Cooper	Pinnacle Bank Arena (15,000); Lincoln, NE
March 2, 2023; 6:00 p.m., FS1		Rutgers	W 75–74	8–20 (2–16)	20 – Battle	10 – Payne	11 – Cooper	Williams Arena (9,010); Minneapolis, MN
March 5, 2023; 6:30 p.m., FS1		Wisconsin	L 67–71	8–21 (2–17)	19 – Garcia	8 – Carrington	8 – Cooper	Williams Arena (12,276); Minneapolis, MN
Big Ten tournament
March 8, 2023; 8:00 p.m., BTN	(14)	vs. (11) Nebraska; First round	W 78–75	9–21	18 – Garcia	13 – Garcia	12 – Cooper	United Center (15,405); Chicago, IL
March 9, 2023; 8:00 p.m., BTN	(14)	vs. (6) Maryland; Second round	L 54–70	9–22	17 – Payne	9 – Payne	6 – Cooper	United Center (16,104); Chicago, IL
*Non-conference game. ^{#}Rankings from AP Poll. (#) Tournament seedings in parentheses. All times are in Central Time.
