= 2022–23 Nebraska Cornhuskers men's basketball team =

American college basketball season

2022–23 Nebraska Cornhuskers men's basketball
- Conference: Big Ten Conference
- Record: 16–16 (9–11 Big Ten)
- Head coach: Fred Hoiberg (4th season)
- Assistant coaches: Adam Howard; Nate Loenser; Ernie Zeigler
- Home arena: Pinnacle Bank Arena

2022–23 Big Ten Conference men's basketball standings
	Conf.				Overall
Team	W		L	PCT	W		L	PCT
No. 3 Purdue †	15	–	5	.750	29	–	6	.829
No. 21 Indiana	12	–	8	.600	23	–	12	.657
Northwestern	12	–	8	.600	22	–	12	.647
Michigan State	11	–	8	.579	21	–	13	.618
Maryland	11	–	9	.550	22	–	13	.629
Illinois	11	–	9	.550	20	–	13	.606
Iowa	11	–	9	.550	19	–	14	.576
Michigan	11	–	9	.550	18	–	16	.529
Penn State	10	–	10	.500	23	–	14	.622
Rutgers	10	–	10	.500	19	–	15	.559
Wisconsin	9	–	11	.450	20	–	15	.571
Nebraska	9	–	11	.450	16	–	16	.500
Ohio State	5	–	15	.250	16	–	19	.457
Minnesota	2	–	17	.105	9	–	22	.290
† Conference tournament winner Rankings from AP poll

The 2022–23 Nebraska Cornhuskers men's basketball team represented the University of Nebraska–Lincoln in the 2022–23 NCAA Division I men's basketball season. The Cornhuskers were led by fourth-year head coach Fred Hoiberg and played their home games at Pinnacle Bank Arena in Lincoln, Nebraska as members of the Big Ten Conference. They finished the season 16–16, 9–11 in Big Ten play to finish in a tie for 11th place. As the No. 11 seed in the Big Ten tournament, they lost to Minnesota in the first round.

== Previous season ==
The Cornhuskers finished the 2021–22 season 10–22, 4–16 in Big Ten play to finish in a tie for last place. As the No. 13 seed in the Big Ten tournament, they lost in the first round Northwestern.

== Offseason ==
=== Departures ===
Name	No.	Pos.	Height	Weight	Year	Hometown	Notes
Eduardo Andre	35	F	6'11"	236	So	Potomac, MD	Transferred to Fresno State
Jackson Cronin	4	G	6'1"	187	Fr	Great Neck, NY	Transferred to UMASS
Keon Edwards	23	G	6'7"	204	Fr	Houston, TX	Transferred to Wisconsin-Milwaukee
Trevor Lakes	14	F	6'8"	220	Sr	Lebanon, IN	Transferred to Southern Indiana
Lat Mayen	11	F	6'9"	217	Jr	Adelaide, Australia	Signed professional contract overseas
Bryce McGowens	5	G	6'7"	179	Fr	Pendleton, SC	Declared for the 2022 NBA draft
Trey McGowens	2	G	6'4"	196	Jr	Pendleton, SC	Declared for the 2022 NBA draft
Chris McGraw	15	G	6'0"	176	So	Columbus, OH	Left to become graduate assistant coach at Vanderbilt
Jace Piatkowski	21	G	6'3"	177	Fr	Omaha, NE	Entered Transfer Portal
Alonzo Verge Jr.	1	G	6'3"	164	Sr	Chicago, IL	Graduated
Kobe Webster	10	G	6'0"	176	Sr	Indianapolis, IN	Graduated

=== Incoming transfers ===
Name	No.	Pos.	Height	Weight	Year	Hometown	Previous school
Emmanuel Bandoumel	25	G	6 ft 4 in	180 lbs	Senior	Quebec City, Quebec	SMU
Juwan Gary	4	F	6 ft 6 in	219 lbs	Junior	Columbia, SC	Alabama
Sam Griesel	5	G	6 ft 6 in	220 lbs	Senior	Lincoln, NE	North Dakota State

=== 2022 recruiting class ===
College recruiting
Name	Hometown	School	Height	Weight	Commit date
Blaise Keita; C	Mali Africa	Coffeyville Community College	6 ft 11 in (2.11 m)	230 lb (100 kg)	Feb 16, 2021
Blaise Keita; C	Recruit ratings: Rivals: 247Sports:				
Jamarques Lawrence; SG	Roselle, NJ	Roselle Catholic	6 ft 3 in (1.91 m)	175 lb (79 kg)	Oct 29, 2021
Jamarques Lawrence; SG	Recruit ratings: Scout: Rivals: 247Sports: (76)				
Ramel Lloyd Jr. SF	Chatsworth, CA	Sierra Canyon	6 ft 6 in (1.98 m)	190 lb (86 kg)	Jul 18, 2021
Ramel Lloyd Jr. SF	Recruit ratings: Rivals: 247Sports: (82)				
Overall recruit ranking: Rivals: 28 247Sports: 32
Note: In many cases, Scout, Rivals, 247Sports, On3, and ESPN may conflict in their listings of height and weight.; In these cases, the average was taken. ESPN grades are on a 100-point scale.; Sources: "2022 Team Ranking". Rivals.

== Roster ==
2022–23 Nebraska Cornhuskers men's basketball team
Players
Coaches

Pos.	#	Name	Height	Weight	Year	Previous school	Hometown
G	0	C.J. Wilcher	6 ft 5 in (1.96 m)	208 lb (94 kg)	So	Xavier	Plainfield, NJ
G	1	Sam Hoiberg (W)	6 ft 0 in (1.83 m)	180 lb (82 kg)	RS Fr	Lincoln Pius X High School	Lincoln, NE
G	2	Ramel Lloyd Jr. (redshirt)	6 ft 6 in (1.98 m)	204 lb (93 kg)	Fr	Sierra Canyon	Chatsworth, CA
G	3	Quaran McPherson (injured)	6 ft 3 in (1.91 m)	197 lb (89 kg)	RS Fr	Link Year Prep	Queens, NY
F	4	Juwan Gary	6 ft 6 in (1.98 m)	215 lb (98 kg)	RS Jr	Alabama	Columbia, SC
G	5	Sam Griesel	6 ft 7 in (2.01 m)	216 lb (98 kg)	Sr	Lincoln East High School	Lincoln, NE
G	10	Jamarques Lawrence	6 ft 3 in (1.91 m)	185 lb (84 kg)	Fr	Roselle Catholic High School	Plainfield, NJ
G	12	Denim Dawson	6 ft 6 in (1.98 m)	193 lb (88 kg)	RS Fr	Southern California Academy	San Bernardino, CA
F	13	Derrick Walker	6 ft 9 in (2.06 m)	245 lb (111 kg)	RS Sr	Tennessee	Kansas City, MO
C	15	Blaise Keita	6 ft 11 in (2.11 m)	241 lb (109 kg)	So	Coffeyville Community College	Mali
G	24	Jeffrey Grace III (W)	6 ft 3 in (1.91 m)	195 lb (88 kg)	Fr	Arizona State	Elmhusrt, IL
G	25	Emmanuel Bandoumel	6 ft 4 in (1.93 m)	187 lb (85 kg)	Sr	SMU	Quebec City, Quebec
G	30	Keisei Tominaga	6 ft 0 in (1.83 m)	175 lb (79 kg)	Jr	Ranger College	Nagoya, Japan
G	31	Cale Jacobsen (W)	6 ft 4 in (1.93 m)	194 lb (88 kg)	Fr	Ashland-Greenwood High School	Ashland, NE
F	32	Wilhelm Breidenbach	6 ft 10 in (2.08 m)	231 lb (105 kg)	So	Mater Dei HS	Rancho Santa Margarita, CA
C	33	Oleg Kojenets	7 ft 0 in (2.13 m)	232 lb (105 kg)	RS Fr	Western Reserve Academy	Kaunas, Lithuania
F	35	Henry Burt (W)	6 ft 4 in (1.93 m)	216 lb (98 kg)	Fr	Elkhorn South High School	Omaha, NE

Head coach

- Fred Hoiberg (Iowa State)

Assistant coach(es)

- Armon Gates (Kent State)
- Adam Howard (Western Kentucky)
- Nate Loenser (Iowa State)

Legend

- (C) Team captain
- (S) Suspended
- (I) Ineligible
- (W) Walk-on
- Injured
- Current redshirt

Roster

== Schedule and results ==
Date time, TV	Rank^{#}	Opponent^{#}	Result	Record	High points	High rebounds	High assists	Site (attendance) city, state
Exhibition
October 23, 2022*; 1:00 p.m., BTN+		Chadron State	W 87–60		23 – Gary	9 – Gary	7 – Griesel	Pinnacle Bank Arena; Lincoln, NE
October 30, 2022*; 5:00 p.m.		at Colorado; Charity Exhibition	L 61–72		14 – Bandoumel	5 – Tied	3 – Griesel	CU Events Center (3,360); Boulder, CO
Regular Season
November 7, 2022*; 7:00 p.m., BTN+		Maine	W 79–66	1–0	22 – Griesel	11 – Gary	3 – Tied	Pinnacle Bank Arena (12,875); Lincoln, NE
November 10, 2022*; 7:00 p.m., BTN+		Omaha	W 75–61	2–0	21 – Wilcher	12 – Keita	3 – Griesel	Pinnacle Bank Arena (13,447); Lincoln, NE
November 17, 2022*; 5:30 p.m., FS1		at St. John's; Gavitt Tipoff Games	L 50–70	2–1	15 – Tominaga	11 – Gary	4 – Griesel	Carnesecca Arena (3,933); Queens, NY
November 20, 2022*; 2:30 p.m., BTN		Arkansas–Pine Bluff	W 82–58	3–1	17 – Gary	10 – Keita	7 – Griesel	Pinnacle Bank Arena (13,262); Lincoln, NE
November 24, 2022*; 4:00 p.m., ESPN		vs. Oklahoma; ESPN Events Invitational Quarterfinals	L 56–69	3–2	16 – Gary	7 – Gary	5 – Bandoumel	State Farm Field House; Orlando, FL
November 25, 2022*; 4:30 p.m., ESPNews		vs. Memphis; ESPN Events Invitational consolation 2nd round	L 61–73	3–3	18 – Bandoumel	12 – Walker	5 – Bandoumel	State Farm Field House; Orlando, FL
November 27, 2022*; 6:30 p.m., ESPNews		vs. Florida State; ESPN Events Invitational 7th Place Game	W 75–58	4–3	20 – Walker	13 – Walker	9 – Griesel	State Farm Field House; Orlando, FL
November 30, 2022*; 8:15 p.m., ESPNU		Boston College; ACC–Big Ten Challenge	W 88–67	5–3	23 – Tominaga	8 – Keita	6 – Tied	Pinnacle Bank Arena (13,080); Lincoln, NE
December 4, 2022*; 3:30 p.m., FS1		at No. 7 Creighton; Rivalry	W 63–53	6–3	22 – Walker	12 – Griesel	7 – Griesel	CHI Health Center Omaha (17,352); Omaha, NE
December 7, 2022; 7:30 p.m., BTN		at No. 14 Indiana	L 65–81	6–4 (0–1)	22 – Wilcher	7 – Gary	5 – Walker	Simon Skjodt Assembly Hall (17,222); Bloomington, IN
December 10, 2022; 1:15 p.m., BTN		No. 4 Purdue	L 62–65 ^{OT}	6–5 (0–2)	19 – Tominaga	10 – Walker	4 – Griesel	Pinnacle Bank Arena (14,236); Lincoln, NE
December 17, 2022*; 6:00 p.m., ESPN+		vs. Kansas State; Wildcat Classic	L 56–71	6–6	13 – Breidenbach	11 – Gary	3 – Walker	T-Mobile Center (13,184); Kansas City, MO
December 20, 2022*; 6:30 p.m., BTN+		Queens; Battle in The Vault	W 75–65	7–6	16 – Griesel	8 – Bandoumel	6 – Walker	Pinnacle Bank Arena (2,523); Lincoln, NE
December 29, 2022; 6:00 p.m., BTN		Iowa	W 66–50	8–6 (1–2)	14 – Gary	10 – Griesel	4 – Griesel	Pinnacle Bank Arena (14,920); Lincoln, NE
January 3, 2023; 6:00 p.m., BTN		at Michigan State	L 56–74	8–7 (1–3)	15 – Walker	9 – Walker	3 – Walker	Breslin Center (14,797); East Lansing, MI
January 7, 2023; 11:00 a.m., BTN		at Minnesota	W 81–79 ^{OT}	9–7 (2–3)	22 – Walker	8 – Walker	7 – Walker	Williams Arena (10,948); Minneapolis, MN
January 10, 2023; 8:00 p.m., BTN		Illinois	L 50–76	9–8 (2–4)	12 – Griesel	7 – Bandoumel	3 – Walker	Pinnacle Bank Arena (12,756); Lincoln, NE
January 13, 2023; 6:00 p.m., BTN		at No. 3 Purdue	L 55–73	9–9 (2–5)	19 – Walker	6 – Walker	4 – Walker	Mackey Arena (14,876); West Lafayette, IN
January 18, 2023; 6:00 p.m., BTN		Ohio State	W 63–60	10–9 (3–5)	15 – Griesel	10 – Walker	4 – Walker	Pinnacle Bank Arena (12,918); Lincoln, NE
January 21, 2023; 1:15 p.m., BTN		at Penn State	L 65–76	10–10 (3–6)	20 – Walker	9 – Dawson	6 – Walker	Bryce Jordan Center (11,297); University Park, PA
January 25, 2023; 6:00 p.m., FS2		Northwestern	L 63–78	10–11 (3–7)	22 – Tominaga	6 – Hoiberg	4 – Walker	Pinnacle Bank Arena (13,205); Lincoln, NE
January 28, 2023; 3:30 p.m., BTN		at Maryland	L 63–82	10–12 (3–8)	16 – Walker	8 – Walker	6 – Griesel	Xfinity Center (15,864); College Park, MD
January 31, 2023; 6:00 p.m., BTN		at Illinois	L 56–72	10–13 (3–9)	21 – Griesel	6 – Tied	4 – Walker	State Farm Center (15,544); Champaign, IL
February 5, 2023; 3:30 p.m., BTN		Penn State	W 72–63	11–13 (4–9)	30 – Tominaga	9 – Lawrence	7 – Walker	Pinnacle Bank Arena (14,385); Lincoln, NE
February 8, 2023; 5:30 p.m., BTN		at Michigan	L 72–93	11–14 (4–10)	24 – Tominaga	7 – Walker	8 – Walker	Crisler Center (11,889); Ann Arbor, MI
February 11, 2023; 3:00 p.m., BTN		Wisconsin	W 73–63 ^{OT}	12–14 (5–10)	22 – Tominaga	11 – Keita	6 – Griesel	Pinnacle Bank Arena (14,811); Lincoln, NE
February 14, 2023; 7:00 p.m., BTN		at Rutgers	W 82–72	13–14 (6–10)	22 – Tominaga	11 – Griesel	5 – Griesel	Jersey Mike's Arena (8,000); Piscataway, NJ
February 19, 2023; 4:00 p.m., FS1		Maryland	W 70–66 ^{OT}	14–14 (7–10)	23 – Walker	8 – Keita	6 – Walker	Pinnacle Bank Arena (15,395); Lincoln, NE
February 25, 2023; 2:30 p.m., BTN		Minnesota	W 78–67	15–14 (8–10)	19 – Griesel	7 – Walker	4 – Walker	Pinnacle Bank Arena (15,489); Lincoln, NE
February 28, 2023; 8:00 p.m., BTN		Michigan State	L 67–80	15–15 (8–11)	20 – Tominaga	8 – Griesel	3 – Tied	Pinnacle Bank Arena (15,020); Lincoln, NE
March 5, 2023; 1:00 p.m., BTN		at Iowa	W 81–77	16–15 (9–11)	16 – Griesel	12 – Walker	8 – Walker	Carver–Hawkeye Arena (15,056); Iowa City, IA
Big Ten tournament
March 8, 2023; 8:00 p.m., BTN	(11)	vs. (14) Minnesota; First round	L 75–78	16–16	23 – Tominaga	12 – Griesel	5 – Walker	United Center (15,405); Chicago, IL
*Non-conference game. ^{#}Rankings from AP Poll. (#) Tournament seedings in parentheses. All times are in Central Time.
