= 2023 Big Ten men's basketball tournament =

American postseason men's collegiate basketball tournament

- Classification: Division I
- Season: 2022–23
- Teams: 14
- Site: United Center; Chicago, Illinois
- Champions: Purdue (2nd title)
- Winning coach: Matt Painter (2nd title)
- MVP: Zach Edey (Purdue)
- Attendance: 131,041
- Television: BTN, CBS/Paramount+

2022–23 Big Ten Conference men's basketball standings
	Conf.				Overall
Team	W		L	PCT	W		L	PCT
No. 3 Purdue †	15	–	5	.750	29	–	6	.829
No. 21 Indiana	12	–	8	.600	23	–	12	.657
Northwestern	12	–	8	.600	22	–	12	.647
Michigan State	11	–	8	.579	21	–	13	.618
Maryland	11	–	9	.550	22	–	13	.629
Illinois	11	–	9	.550	20	–	13	.606
Iowa	11	–	9	.550	19	–	14	.576
Michigan	11	–	9	.550	18	–	16	.529
Penn State	10	–	10	.500	23	–	14	.622
Rutgers	10	–	10	.500	19	–	15	.559
Wisconsin	9	–	11	.450	20	–	15	.571
Nebraska	9	–	11	.450	16	–	16	.500
Ohio State	5	–	15	.250	16	–	19	.457
Minnesota	2	–	17	.105	9	–	22	.290
† Conference tournament winner Rankings from AP poll

The 2023 Big Ten men's basketball tournament was a postseason men's basketball tournament for the Big Ten Conference of the 2022–23 NCAA Division I men's basketball season which took place from March 8–12, 2023. The tournament was held at the United Center in Chicago, Illinois. This was the last year in which the first round was broadcast on BTN, as it would move to Peacock starting 2024.

Purdue defeated Penn State 67–65 to win the tournament. As a result, they received the conference's automatic bid to the 2023 NCAA tournament.

== Seeds ==
All 14 Big Ten schools participated in the tournament. Teams were seeded by conference record, with a tiebreaker system used to seed teams with identical conference records. The top 10 teams received a first round bye and the top four teams received a double bye. Tiebreaking procedures remained unchanged from the 2022 tournament.

Seed	School	Conference	Tiebreak 1
1	Purdue	15–5	
2	Northwestern	12–8	2–0 vs. Indiana
3	Indiana	12–8	0–2 vs. Northwestern
4	Michigan State	11–8	
5	Iowa	11–9	3–0 vs. Illinois/Maryland/Michigan
6	Maryland	11–9	2–2 vs. Illinois/Iowa/Michigan
7	Illinois	11–9	1–2 vs. Iowa/Maryland/Michigan
8	Michigan	11–9	1–3 vs. Illinois/Iowa/Maryland
9	Rutgers	10–10	2–0 vs. Penn State
10	Penn State	10–10	0–2 vs. Rutgers
11	Nebraska	9–11	1–0 vs. Wisconsin
12	Wisconsin	9–11	0–1 vs. Nebraska
13	Ohio State	5–15	
14	Minnesota	2–17	

== Schedule ==
Session	Game	Time*	Matchup^{#}	Score	Television	Attendance
First round – Wednesday, March 8
1	1	5:30 pm	No. 13 Ohio State vs. No. 12 Wisconsin	65–57	BTN	15,405
1	2	8:00 pm	No. 14 Minnesota vs. No. 11 Nebraska	78–75	BTN	15,405
Second round – Thursday, March 9
2	3	11:00 am	No. 9 Rutgers vs. No. 8 Michigan	62–50	BTN	15,537
2	4	1:30 pm	No. 13 Ohio State vs. No. 5 Iowa	73–69	BTN	15,537
3	5	5:30 pm	No. 10 Penn State vs. No. 7 Illinois	79–76	BTN	16,104
3	6	8:00 pm	No. 14 Minnesota vs. No. 6 Maryland	54–70	BTN	16,104
Quarterfinals – Friday, March 10
4	7	11:00 am	No. 9 Rutgers vs. No. 1 Purdue	65–70	BTN	16,738
4	8	1:30 pm	No. 13 Ohio State vs. No. 4 Michigan State	68–58	BTN	16,738
5	9	5:30 pm	No. 10 Penn State vs. No. 2 Northwestern	67–65^{OT}	BTN	18,892
5	10	8:00 pm	No. 6 Maryland vs. No. 3 Indiana	60–70	BTN	18,892
Semifinals – Saturday, March 11
6	11	12:00 pm	No. 1 Purdue vs. No. 13 Ohio State	80–66	CBS/Paramount+	18,059
6	12	2:30 pm	No. 10 Penn State vs. No. 3 Indiana	77–73	CBS/Paramount+	18,059
Championship – Sunday, March 12
7	13	2:30 pm	No. 1 Purdue vs No. 10 Penn State	67–65	CBS/Paramount+	16,183

*Game times in Central Time. #Rankings denote tournament seeding.

== Bracket ==
First round Wednesday, March 8 BTN/Fox Sports App
12	Wisconsin	57
13	Ohio State	65
11	Nebraska	75
14	Minnesota	78

Second round Thursday, March 9 BTN/Fox Sports App
8	Michigan	50
9	Rutgers	62
5	Iowa	69
13	Ohio State	73
7	Illinois	76
10	Penn State	79
6	Maryland	70
14	Minnesota	54

Quarterfinals; Friday, March 10; BTN/Fox Sports App
1	Purdue	70
9	Rutgers	65
4	Michigan State	58
13	Ohio State	68
2	Northwestern	65
10	Penn State	67*
3	Indiana	70
6	Maryland	60

Semifinals; Saturday, March 11; CBS/Paramount+
1	Purdue	80
13	Ohio State	66
10	Penn State	77
3	Indiana	73

Championship; Sunday, March 12; CBS/Paramount+
1	Purdue	67
10	Penn State	65

* denotes overtime period

== Game summaries ==
=== First round ===
BTN

March 8
5:30 pm

No. 13 Ohio State 65, No. 12 Wisconsin 57
Scoring by half: 36–18, 29–39
Pts: Sean McNeil, 17; Rebs: Brice Sensabaugh, 11; Asts: Roddy Gayle Jr., 3	Pts: Tyler Wahl, 19; Rebs: Tyler Wahl, 10; Asts: Tied, 3

United Center
Chicago, IL
Attendance: 15,405
Referees: Brian Dorsey, DJ Carstensen, Keith Kimble

BTN

March 8
8:00 pm

No. 14 Minnesota 78, No. 11 Nebraska 75
Scoring by half: 37–33, 41–42
Pts: Dawson Garcia, 18; Rebs: Dawson Garcia, 13; Asts: Talon Cooper, 12	Pts: Keisei Tominaga, 23; Rebs: Sam Griesel, 12; Asts: Derrick Walker, 5

United Center
Chicago, IL
Attendance: 15,405
Referees: Paul Szelc, Larry Scirotto, Kelly Pfeifer

=== Second round ===
BTN

March 9
11:00 am

No. 9 Rutgers 62, No. 8 Michigan 50
Scoring by half: 25–28, 37–22
Pts: Cam Spencer, 18; Rebs: Caleb McConnell, 9 Asts: Paul Mulcahy, 5	Pts: Hunter Dickinson, 24; Rebs: Tied, 7 Asts: Kobe Bufkin, 5

United Center
Chicago, IL
Attendance: 15,537
Referees: Larry Scirotto, Courtney Green, Chris Beaver

BTN

March 9
1:30 pm

No. 13 Ohio State 73, No. 5 Iowa 69
Scoring by half: 29–28, 44–41
Pts: Bruce Thornton, 17; Rebs: Tied, 5 Asts: Bruce Thornton, 6	Pts: Filip Rebrača, 20; Rebs: Filip Rebrača, 7 Asts: Kris Murray, 5

United Center
Chicago, IL
Attendance: 15,537
Referees: Brian Dorsey, Rob Riley Sr., John Floyd

BTN

March 9
5:30 pm

No. 10 Penn State 79, No. 7 Illinois 76
Scoring by half: 31–30, 48–46
Pts: Andrew Funk, 20; Rebs: Seth Lundy, 10; Asts: Jalen Pickett, 8	Pts: Terrence Shannon Jr., 19; Rebs: Matthew Mayer, 8 Asts: Tied, 4

United Center
Chicago, IL
Attendance: 16,104
Referees: Paul Szelc, Kelly Pfeifer, Lewis Garrison

BTN

March 9
8:00 pm

No. 14 Minnesota 54, No. 6 Maryland 70
Scoring by half: 24–31, 30–39
Pts: Pharrel Payne, 17; Rebs: Pharrel Payne, 9 Asts: Ta'Lon Cooper, 6	Pts: Donta Scott, 20; Rebs: Tied, 8 Asts: Tied, 3

United Center
Chicago, IL
Attendance: 16,104
Referees: DJ Carstensen, Rob Kueneman, Edwin Young

=== Quarterfinals ===
BTN

March 10
11:00 am

No. 9 Rutgers 65, No. 1 Purdue 70
Scoring by half: 28–29, 37–41
Pts: Derek Simpson, 18; Rebs: Clifford Omoruyi, 8 Asts: Paul Mulcahy, 5	Pts: Mason Gillis, 20; Rebs: Zach Edey, 11; Asts: Braden Smith, 5

United Center
Chicago, IL
Attendance: 16,738
Referees: DJ Carstensen, Rob Riley, Edwin Young

BTN

March 10
1:30 pm

No. 13 Ohio State 68, No. 4 Michigan State 58
Scoring by half: 33–24, 35–32
Pts: Bruce Thornton, 21; Rebs: Felix Okpara, 8 Asts: Bruce Thornton, 6	Pts: Joey Hauser, 15; Rebs: Joey Hauser, 6 Asts: Tied, 2

United Center
Chicago, IL
Attendance: 16,738
Referees: Larry Scirotto, Kelly Pfeifer, Rob Kueneman

BTN

March 10
5:30 pm

No. 10 Penn State 67, No. 2 Northwestern 65 (OT)
Scoring by half: 25−26, 31−30 Overtime: 11−9
Pts: Seth Lundy, 16; Rebs: Jalen Pickett, 9 Asts: Tied, 2	Pts: Boo Buie, 16; Rebs: Brooks Barnhizer, 11; Asts: Boo Buie, 4

United Center
Chicago, IL
Attendance: 18,892
Referees: Brian Dorsey, Courtney Green, Brooks Wells

BTN

March 10
8:00 pm

No. 6 Maryland 60, No. 3 Indiana 70
Scoring by half: 34−32, 26−38
Pts: Hakim Hart, 16; Rebs: Julian Reese, 7 Asts: Tied, 4	Pts: Trayce Jackson-Davis, 24; Rebs: Malik Reneau, 11; Asts: Trayce Jackson-Davis, 7

United Center
Chicago, IL
Attendance: 18,892
Referees: Paul Szelc, Karl Walfon, John Floyd

=== Semifinals ===
CBS/Paramount+

March 11
12:00 pm

No. 1 Purdue 80, No. 13 Ohio State 66
Scoring by half: 42−34, 38−32
Pts: Zach Edey, 32; Rebs: Zach Edey, 14; Asts: Tied, 5	Pts: Roddy Gayle Jr., 20; Rebs: Eugene Brown III, 6 Asts: Isaac Likekele, 5

United Center
Chicago, IL
Attendance: 18,059
Referees: Kelly Pfeifer, Earl Watson, Larry Scirotto

CBS/Paramount+

March 11
2:30 pm

No. 10 Penn State 77, No. 3 Indiana 73
Scoring by half: 34−26, 43−47
Pts: Jalen Pickett, 28; Rebs: Kebba Njie, 9 Asts: Jalen Pickett, 4	Pts: Trayce Jackson-Davis, 24; Rebs: Trayce Jackson-Davis, 10; Asts: Trayce Jackson-Davis, 7

United Center
Chicago, IL
Attendance: 18,059
Referees: Rob Riley, Courtney Green, DJ Carstensen

=== Championship ===
CBS/Paramount+

March 12
2:30 pm

No. 1 Purdue 67, No. 10 Penn State 65
Scoring by half: 35–27, 32–38
Pts: Zach Edey, 30; Rebs: Zach Edey, 13; Asts: Braden Smith, 7	Pts: Seth Lundy, 19; Rebs: Seth Lundy, 8 Asts: Tied, 4

United Center
Chicago, IL
Attendance: 16,183
Referees: DJ Carstensen, Keith Kimble, Paul Szelc
