= 2022–23 Iowa Hawkeyes men's basketball team =

2022–23 Iowa Hawkeyes men's basketball

NCAA tournament, First Round
- Conference: Big Ten Conference
- Record: 19–14 (11–9 Big Ten)
- Head coach: Fran McCaffery (13th season)
- Assistant coaches: Sherman Dillard; Matt Gatens; Courtney Eldridge
- Home arena: Carver–Hawkeye Arena

2022–23 Big Ten Conference men's basketball standings
	Conf.				Overall
Team	W		L	PCT	W		L	PCT
No. 3 Purdue †	15	–	5	.750	29	–	6	.829
No. 21 Indiana	12	–	8	.600	23	–	12	.657
Northwestern	12	–	8	.600	22	–	12	.647
Michigan State	11	–	8	.579	21	–	13	.618
Maryland	11	–	9	.550	22	–	13	.629
Illinois	11	–	9	.550	20	–	13	.606
Iowa	11	–	9	.550	19	–	14	.576
Michigan	11	–	9	.550	18	–	16	.529
Penn State	10	–	10	.500	23	–	14	.622
Rutgers	10	–	10	.500	19	–	15	.559
Wisconsin	9	–	11	.450	20	–	15	.571
Nebraska	9	–	11	.450	16	–	16	.500
Ohio State	5	–	15	.250	16	–	19	.457
Minnesota	2	–	17	.105	9	–	22	.290
† Conference tournament winner Rankings from AP poll

The 2022–23 Iowa Hawkeyes men's basketball team represented the University of Iowa during the 2022–23 NCAA Division I men's basketball season. The team was led by 13th-year head coach Fran McCaffery and played its home games at Carver–Hawkeye Arena as members of the Big Ten Conference. They finished the season 19–14, 11–9 in Big Ten play to finish in a four-way tie for fifth place. As the No. 5 seed in the Big Ten tournament, they lost to No. 13-seeded Ohio State in the second round. The Hawkeyes received an at-large bid to the NCAA tournament as the No. 8 seed in the Midwest region where the lost to Auburn in the First Round.

Junior forward Kris Murray earned First-team All-Big Ten honors and Third-team AP, Sporting News and USBWA All-America honors while averaging 20.2 points per game. It marked the fourth consecutive season that an Iowa player was named a consensus All-American, following twin brother Keegan Murray in 2022 and Luka Garza in 2021 and 2020.

== Previous season ==
The Hawkeyes finished the 2021–22 season 26–10, 12–8 in Big Ten play to finish in a three-way tie for fourth place. The 26 wins were the most wins in a season for Iowa since the Elite Eight team in 1987 earned 30 wins. As the No. 5 seed in the Big Ten tournament, they defeated Northwestern, Rutgers, Indiana, and Purdue to win the tournament championship. As a result, the Hawkeyes received the conference's automatic bid to the NCAA tournament as the No. 5 seed in the Midwest region. The Hawkeyes were upset by No. 12-seeded Richmond in the First Round.

Sophomore forward Keegan Murray earned consensus First-team All-American honors, and established a new school record for points in a season. It was the third consecutive season that an Iowa player was selected a consensus First-team All-American (Luka Garza, 2019–20 and 2020–21) and set a new school record for points in a season.

== Offseason ==
=== Departures ===
Name	Number	Pos.	Height	Weight	Year	Hometown	Reason for departure
Joe Toussaint	2	G	6'0"	190	Senior	Bronx, NY	Graduate transferred to West Virginia
Jordan Bohannon	3	G	6'1"	175	RS Senior	Marion, IA	Graduated
Austin Ash	13	G	6'3"	180	RS Senior	Cedar Rapids, IA	Walk-on; graduate transferred to The Citadel
Keegan Murray	15	F	6'8"	225	Sophomore	Cedar Rapids, IA	Declare for 2022 NBA draft

=== Recruiting classes ===
==== 2022 recruiting class ====
College recruiting
Name	Hometown	School	Height	Weight	Commit date
Dasonte Bowen #30 PG	Boston, MA	Brewster Academy	6 ft 3 in (1.91 m)	180 lb (82 kg)	Jun 9, 2021
Dasonte Bowen #30 PG	Recruit ratings: Rivals: 247Sports: ESPN: (82)				
Josh Dix #47 SG	Council Bluffs, IA	Abraham Lincoln High School	6 ft 4 in (1.93 m)	180 lb (82 kg)	Sep 11, 2021
Josh Dix #47 SG	Recruit ratings: Rivals: 247Sports: ESPN: (78)				
Overall recruit ranking: 247Sports: 68
Note: In many cases, Scout, Rivals, 247Sports, On3, and ESPN may conflict in their listings of height and weight.; In these cases, the average was taken. ESPN grades are on a 100-point scale.; Sources: "2022 Iowa Basketball Commitment List". Rivals.; "ESPN – Iowa Hawkeyes Men's Basketball Recruiting". ESPN.; "2022 Team Ranking". Rivals.; "Iowa 2022 Basketball Commits". 247Sports.

==== 2023 recruiting class ====
College recruiting (2023)
Name	Hometown	School	Height	Weight	Commit date
Pryce Sandfort #15 PG	Waukee, IA	Northwest High School	6 ft 6 in (1.98 m)	160 lb (73 kg)	Aug 6, 2022
Pryce Sandfort #15 PG	Recruit ratings: Rivals: 247Sports: ESPN: (82)				
Owen Freeman #29 C	Moline, IL	Moline Senior High School	6 ft 9 in (2.06 m)	225 lb (102 kg)	Oct 11, 2021
Owen Freeman #29 C	Recruit ratings: Rivals: 247Sports: ESPN: (80)				
Brock Harding; PG	Moline, IL	Moline Senior High School	6 ft 0 in (1.83 m)	155 lb (70 kg)	Jun 23, 2022
Brock Harding; PG	Recruit ratings: Rivals: 247Sports: ESPN: (NR)				
Overall recruit ranking: 247Sports: 68
Note: In many cases, Scout, Rivals, 247Sports, On3, and ESPN may conflict in their listings of height and weight.; In these cases, the average was taken. ESPN grades are on a 100-point scale.; Sources: "2023 Iowa Basketball Commitment List". Rivals.; "ESPN – Iowa Hawkeyes Men's Basketball Recruiting". ESPN.; "2023 Team Ranking". Rivals.; "Iowa 2023 Basketball Commits". 247Sports.

== Roster ==
2022–23 Iowa Hawkeyes men's basketball team
Players
Coaches

Pos.	#	Name	Height	Weight	Year	Previous school	Hometown
F	0	Filip Rebrača	6 ft 9 in (2.06 m)	230 lb (104 kg)	GS	North Dakota	Sombor, Serbia
G	1	Ahron Ulis	6 ft 3 in (1.91 m)	190 lb (86 kg)	Jr	Marian Catholic HS	Chicago, IL
G	2	Amarion Nimmers (W)	6 ft 2 in (1.88 m)	173 lb (78 kg)	Fr	Rock Island HS	Rock Island, IL
G	4	Josh Dix	6 ft 5 in (1.96 m)	192 lb (87 kg)	Fr	Lincoln HS	Council Bluffs, IA
G	5	Dasonte Bowen	6 ft 2 in (1.88 m)	174 lb (79 kg)	Fr	Brewster Academy	Boston, MA
G	10	Dante Eldridge (W)	5 ft 9 in (1.75 m)	170 lb (77 kg)	Jr	Kirkwood CC	North Liberty, IA
G	11	Tony Perkins	6 ft 4 in (1.93 m)	205 lb (93 kg)	Jr	Lawrence North HS	Indianapolis, IN
G	14	Carter Kingsbury (W)	6 ft 4 in (1.93 m)	225 lb (102 kg)	RS Fr	Brewster Academy	Ponca, NE
G	20	Payton Sandfort	6 ft 7 in (2.01 m)	215 lb (98 kg)	So	Waukee HS	Waukee, IA
F	22	Patrick McCaffery	6 ft 9 in (2.06 m)	210 lb (95 kg)	RS Jr	Iowa City West HS	Iowa City, IA
C	23	Josh Ogundele	6 ft 10 in (2.08 m)	275 lb (125 kg)	Jr	Worcester Academy	London, England
F	24	Kris Murray	6 ft 8 in (2.03 m)	220 lb (100 kg)	Jr	Prairie HS/DME Sports Academy	Cedar Rapids, IA
G	25	Luc Laketa (W)	6 ft 5 in (1.96 m)	180 lb (82 kg)	So	The Winchendon School	Concord, MI
G/F	30	Connor McCaffery	6 ft 6 in (1.98 m)	215 lb (98 kg)	GS	Iowa City West HS	Iowa City, IA
C	44	Riley Mulvey	6 ft 11 in (2.11 m)	245 lb (111 kg)	So	St. Thomas More School	Rotterdam, NY

Head coach

- Fran McCaffery (Penn)

Assistant coach(es)

- Sherman Dillard (James Madison)
- Matt Gatens (Iowa)
- Courtney Eldridge (UNC Greensboro)

Legend

- (C) Team captain
- (S) Suspended
- (I) Ineligible
- (W) Walk-on
- Injured
- Current redshirt

Roster

== Schedule and results ==
Date time, TV	Rank^{#}	Opponent^{#}	Result	Record	High points	High rebounds	High assists	Site (attendance) city, state
Exhibition
October 31, 2022*; 7:00 p.m., BTN+		Truman State	W 118–72		24 – Murray	7 – Murray	4 – Perkins	Carver–Hawkeye Arena (9,428); Iowa City, IA
Regular season
November 7, 2022*; 6:00 p.m., ESPNU		Bethune–Cookman	W 89–56	1–0	16 – Perkins	10 – Rebrača	5 – Perkins	Carver–Hawkeye Arena (9,545); Iowa City, IA
November 11, 2022*; 7:00 p.m., BTN+		North Carolina A&T	W 112–71	2–0	22 – Murray	8 – Murray	6 – Perkins	Carver–Hawkeye Arena (11,296); Iowa City, IA
November 16, 2022*; 6:30 p.m., FS1		at Seton Hall; Gavitt Tipoff Games	W 83–67	3–0	29 – Murray	11 – Murray	5 – Perkins	Prudential Center (8,933); Newark, NJ
November 21, 2022*; 7:00 p.m., BTN	No. 25	Omaha; Emerald Coast Classic campus site game	W 100–64	4–0	30 – Murray	8 – Rebrača	4 – Tied	Carver–Hawkeye Arena (9,467); Iowa City, IA
November 25, 2022*; 6:00 p.m., CBSSN	No. 25	vs. Clemson; Emerald Coast Classic semifinal	W 74–71	5–0	21 – P. McCaffery	12 – Murray	3 – Sandfort	The Arena at NFSC (1,880); Niceville, FL
November 26, 2022*; 6:00 p.m., CBSSN	No. 25	vs. TCU; Emerald Coast Classic championship	L 66–79	5–1	15 – Tied	10 – Murray	3 – Sandfort	The Arena at NFSC (1,624); Niceville, FL
November 29, 2022*; 8:00 p.m., ESPN2		Georgia Tech; ACC–Big Ten Challenge	W 81–65	6–1	31 – Murray	20 – Murray	5 – Ulis	Carver–Hawkeye Arena (10,450); Iowa City, IA
December 6, 2022*; 8:30 p.m., ESPN		vs. No. 15 Duke; Jimmy V Classic	L 62–74	6–2	12 – Tied	8 – Rebrača	3 – Murray	Madison Square Garden (17,828); New York, NY
December 8, 2022*; 7:00 p.m., FS1		No. 20 Iowa State; Rivalry	W 75–56	7–2	22 – Rebrača	11 – Rebrača	4 – Tied	Carver–Hawkeye Arena (14,535); Iowa City, IA
December 11, 2022; 5:30 p.m., BTN		Wisconsin	L 75–78 ^{OT}	7–3 (0–1)	24 – P. McCaffery	10 – C. McCaffery	5 – C. McCaffery	Carver–Hawkeye Arena (12,430); Iowa City, IA
December 17, 2022*; 7:30 p.m., BTN		Southeast Missouri State	W 106–75	8–3	30 – Rebrača	9 – Rebrača	6 – Rebrača	Carver–Hawkeye Arena (11,240); Iowa City, IA
December 21, 2022*; 7:00 p.m., BTN+		Eastern Illinois	L 83–92	8–4	24 – Rebrača	13 – P. McCaffery	5 – Perkins	Carver–Hawkeye Arena (10,553); Iowa City, IA
December 29, 2022; 6:00 p.m., BTN		at Nebraska	L 50–66	8–5 (0–2)	17 – Murray	13 – Rebrača	2 – Tied	Pinnacle Bank Arena (14,920); Lincoln, NE
January 1, 2023; 4:30 p.m., BTN		at Penn State	L 79–83	8–6 (0–3)	32 – Murray	9 – Murray	4 – Bowen	Bryce Jordan Center (6,080); University Park, PA
January 5, 2023; 8:00 p.m., FS1		No. 15 Indiana	W 91–89	9–6 (1–3)	30 – Murray	10 – Tied	4 – Tied	Carver–Hawkeye Arena (11,916); Iowa City, IA
January 8, 2023; 11:00 a.m., BTN		at Rutgers	W 76–65	10–6 (2–3)	22 – Sandfort	12 – Rebrača	8 – C. McCaffery	Jersey Mike's Arena (8,000); Piscataway, NJ
January 12, 2023; 6:00 p.m., ESPN2		Michigan	W 93–84 ^{OT}	11–6 (3–3)	27 – Murray	12 – Rebrača	5 – Dix	Carver–Hawkeye Arena (11,498); Iowa City, IA
January 15, 2023; 3:30 p.m., BTN		Maryland	W 81–67	12–6 (4–3)	22 – Perkins	7 – Sandfort	5 – Dix	Carver–Hawkeye Arena (13,376); Iowa City, IA
January 21, 2022; 1:00 p.m., FOX		at Ohio State	L 77–93	12–7 (4–4)	22 – Murray	7 – Murray	4 – Murray	Value City Arena (13,630); Columbus, OH
January 26, 2023; 6:00 p.m., FS1		at Michigan State	L 61–63	12–8 (4–5)	17 – Ulis	11 – Rebrača	3 – Ulis	Breslin Center (14,797); East Lansing, MI
January 29, 2023; 1:00 p.m., BTN		Rutgers	W 93–82	13–8 (5–5)	24 – Murray	8 – Sandfort	6 – C. McCaffery	Carver–Hawkeye Arena (13,907); Iowa City, IA
January 31, 2023; 8:00 p.m., BTN		Northwestern; Rescheduled from Jan. 18	W 86–70	14–8 (6–5)	20 – Tied	10 – Rebrača	5 – Sandfort	Carver–Hawkeye Arena (11,667); Iowa City, IA
February 4, 2023; 1:30 p.m., FOX		Illinois; Rivalry	W 81–79	15–8 (7–5)	32 – Perkins	7 – Murray	3 – Murray	Carver–Hawkeye Arena (15,056); Iowa City, IA
February 9, 2023; 6:00 p.m., ESPN2		at No. 1 Purdue	L 73–87	15–9 (7–6)	24 – Murray	5 – Rebrača	8 – C. McCaffery	Mackey Arena (14,804); West Lafayette, IN
February 12, 2023; 12:00 p.m., FS1		at Minnesota	W 68–56	16–9 (8–6)	28 – Murray	14 – Murray	6 – Perkins	Williams Arena (10,683); Minneapolis, MN
February 16, 2023; 8:00 p.m., ESPN2		Ohio State	W 92–75	17–9 (9–6)	24 – Perkins	6 – C. McCaffery	13 – C. McCaffery	Carver–Hawkeye Arena (13,257); Iowa City, IA
February 19, 2023; 5:30 p.m., BTN		at Northwestern	L 60–80	17–10 (9–7)	14 – Murray	7 – Rebrača	5 – C. McCaffery	Welsh–Ryan Arena (7,039); Evanston, IL
February 22, 2023; 8:00 p.m., BTN		at Wisconsin	L 52–64	17–11 (9–8)	13 – Tied	8 – C. McCaffery	2 – Ulis	Kohl Center (16,029); Madison, WI
February 25, 2023; 11:00 a.m., ESPN		Michigan State	W 112–106 ^{OT}	18–11 (10–8)	26 – Murray	9 – Perkins	6 – Tied	Carver–Hawkeye Arena (15,056); Iowa City, IA
February 28, 2023; 6:00 p.m., ESPN2		at No. 15 Indiana	W 90–68	19–11 (11–8)	26 – Murray	10 – Perkins	8 – Perkins	Simon Skjodt Assembly Hall (17,222); Bloomington, IN
March 5, 2023; 1:00 p.m., BTN		Nebraska	L 77–81	19–12 (11–9)	23 – P. McCaffery	8 – C. McCaffery	9 – C. McCaffery	Carver–Hawkeye Arena (15,056); Iowa City, IA
Big Ten tournament
March 9, 2023; 1:30 p.m., BTN	(5)	vs. (13) Ohio State; Second round	L 69–73	19–13	20 – Rebrača	7 – Rebrača	5 – Murray	United Center (15,537); Chicago, IL
NCAA tournament
March 16, 2023; 5:50 p.m., TNT	(8 MW)	vs. (9 MW) Auburn; First Round	L 75–83	19–14	21 – Sandfort	9 – Murray	3 – Tied	Legacy Arena (15,154); Birmingham, AL
*Non-conference game. ^{#}Rankings from AP Poll. (#) Tournament seedings in parentheses. MW=Midwest. All times are in Central Time.

== Rankings ==
Ranking movements Legend: ██ Increase in ranking ██ Decrease in ranking — = Not ranked RV = Received votes
	Week																			
Poll	Pre	1	2	3	4	5	6	7	8	9	10	11	12	13	14	15	16	17	18	Final
AP	RV	RV	25	RV	RV	RV	RV				RV			RV	RV			RV	—	Not released
Coaches	RV	RV	24	RV	24	RV	RV	RV		RV	RV			RV	RV	RV		RV	—	
