= 2022–23 Big Ten Conference men's basketball season =

- League: NCAA Division I
- Sport: Basketball
- Teams: 14
- TV partner(s): Big Ten Network, ESPN, Fox, FS1, CBS

2022–23 NCAA Division I men's basketball season
- Regular season champions: Purdue
- Season MVP: Zach Edey, Purdue
- Top scorer: Zach Edey, Purdue

Tournament
- Venue: United Center, Chicago, Illinois
- Champions: Purdue
- Runners-up: Penn State
- Finals MVP: Zach Edey

Basketball seasons
- 2021–22 2023–24

2022–23 Big Ten Conference men's basketball standings
	Conf.				Overall
Team	W		L	PCT	W		L	PCT
No. 3 Purdue †	15	–	5	.750	29	–	6	.829
No. 21 Indiana	12	–	8	.600	23	–	12	.657
Northwestern	12	–	8	.600	22	–	12	.647
Michigan State	11	–	8	.579	21	–	13	.618
Maryland	11	–	9	.550	22	–	13	.629
Illinois	11	–	9	.550	20	–	13	.606
Iowa	11	–	9	.550	19	–	14	.576
Michigan	11	–	9	.550	18	–	16	.529
Penn State	10	–	10	.500	23	–	14	.622
Rutgers	10	–	10	.500	19	–	15	.559
Wisconsin	9	–	11	.450	20	–	15	.571
Nebraska	9	–	11	.450	16	–	16	.500
Ohio State	5	–	15	.250	16	–	19	.457
Minnesota	2	–	17	.105	9	–	22	.290
† Conference tournament winner Rankings from AP poll

The 2022–23 Big Ten men's basketball season was the season for Big Ten Conference basketball teams that began with practices in October 2022, followed by the start of the 2022–23 NCAA Division I men's basketball season in November 2022. The regular season ended in March 2023.

With Northwestern's loss to Maryland on February 26, 2023, Purdue clinched a share of the Big Ten regular season championship. With Michigan's loss to Illinois on March 2, Purdue clinched the outright regular season championship, its first outright championship since 2017. The championship marked the school's 25th, the most in Big Ten history.

Purdue center Zach Edey was named Big Ten Player of the Year. Northwestern coach Chris Collins was named Big Ten Coach of the Year.

The Big Ten tournament was held March 8 through March 12 at United Center in Chicago, Illinois. Purdue defeated Penn State in the championship game.

In addition to Purdue, who received the conference's automatic bid to the NCAA tournament, the conference had eight teams received bids to the tournament: Illinois, Indiana, Iowa, Maryland, Michigan State, Northwestern, and Penn State.

Three schools also received invitations to the National Invitation Tournament: Michigan, Rutgers, and Wisconsin.

== Head coaches ==
=== Coaching changes ===
==== Maryland ====
On December 3, 2021, Maryland and Mark Turgeon agreed to part ways effective immediately. Assistant coach Danny Manning was named interim coach for the remainder of the season. Following the season, the school named Seton Hall coach Kevin Willard the team's new head coach.

=== Coaches ===
Team	Head coach	Previous job	Years at school	Overall record	Big Ten record	Big Ten titles	Big Ten tournament titles	NCAA Tournaments	NCAA Final Fours	NCAA Championships
Illinois	Brad Underwood	Oklahoma State	6	93–66 (.585)	55–43 (.561)	1	1	2	0	0
Indiana	Mike Woodson	New York Knicks (Asst.)	2	21–14 (.600)	9–11 (.450)	0	0	1	0	0
Iowa	Fran McCaffery	Siena	13	244–162 (.601)	115–109 (.513)	0	1	6	0	0
Maryland	Kevin Willard	Seton Hall	1	0–0 (–)	0–0 (–)	0	0	0	0	0
Michigan	Juwan Howard	Miami Heat (Asst.)	4	61–31 (.663)	35–22 (.614)	1	0	2	0	0
Michigan State	Tom Izzo	Michigan State (Asst.)	28	666–257 (.722)	322–152 (.679)	10	6	24	8	1
Minnesota	Ben Johnson	Xavier (Asst.)	2	13–17 (.433)	4–16 (.200)	0	0	0	0	0
Nebraska	Fred Hoiberg	Chicago Bulls	4	24–67 (.264)	9–50 (.153)	0	0	0	0	0
Northwestern	Chris Collins	Duke (Asst.)	10	133–150 (.470)	56–111 (.335)	0	0	1	0	0
Ohio State	Chris Holtmann	Butler	6	107–51 (.677)	46–32 (.590)	0	0	4	0	0
Penn State	Micah Shrewsberry	Purdue (Asst.)	2	14–17 (.452)	7–13 (.350)	0	0	0	0	0
Purdue	Matt Painter	Purdue (Assoc.)	18	384–192 (.667)	194–115 (.628)	3	1	13	0	0
Rutgers	Steve Pikiell	Stony Brook	7	88–92 (.489)	46–50 (.479)	0	0	2	0	0
Wisconsin	Greg Gard	Wisconsin (Assoc.)	8	144–78 (.649)	81–50 (.618)	2	0	5	0	0

Notes:

- All records, appearances, titles, etc. are from time with current school only.
- Year at school includes 2022–23 season.
- Overall and Big Ten records are from time at current school only and are through the beginning of the season.

== Preseason ==
=== Preseason Big Ten poll ===
Prior to the conference's annual media day, unofficial awards and a poll were chosen by a panel of writers.

Rank	Team
1	Indiana (19)
2	Illinois (6)
3	Michigan (1)
4	Michigan State
5	Purdue
6	Ohio State
7	Iowa
8	Rutgers
9	Wisconsin
10	Maryland
11	Penn State
12	Minnesota
13	Northwestern
14	Nebraska
(first place votes)

=== Preseason All-Big Ten ===
Prior to the conference's annual media day, unofficial awards and a poll were chosen by a panel of writers.

Honor	Recipient
Preseason Player of the Year	Trayce Jackson-Davis, Indiana
Preseason All-Big Ten Team	Jamison Battle, Minnesota
Preseason All-Big Ten Team	Zach Edey, Purdue
Preseason All-Big Ten Team	Hunter Dickinson, Michigan
Preseason All-Big Ten Team	Malik Hall, Michigan State
Preseason All-Big Ten Team	Chuck Hepburn, Wisconsin
Preseason All-Big Ten Team	Trayce Jackson-Davis, Indiana
Preseason All-Big Ten Team	Kris Murray, Iowa
Preseason All-Big Ten Team	Clifford Omoruyi, Rutgers
Preseason All-Big Ten Team	Jalen Pickett, Penn State
Preseason All-Big Ten Team	Terrence Shannon Jr., Illinois
Preseason All-Big Ten Team	Tyler Wahl, Wisconsin

=== Preseason watchlists ===
Below is a table of notable preseason watch lists.

Player	Wooden	West	Erving	Malone	Abdul-Jabbar
Jamison Battle, Minnesota			✓		
Hunter Dickinson, Michigan	✓				✓
Zach Edey, Purdue	✓				✓
Trayce Jackson-Davis, Indiana	✓			✓	
Kris Murray, Iowa	✓			✓	
Cliff Omoruyi, Rutgers					✓
Terrance Shannon Jr., Illinois	✓	✓			
Tyler Wahl, Wisconsin			✓		

=== Preseason national polls ===
	AP	Blue Ribbon Yearbook	CBS Sports	Coaches	ESPN	Lindy's Sports	Sporting News
Illinois	23	22	9	23	24		20
Indiana	13	12	22	14	14	6	7
Iowa							
Maryland							
Michigan	22	18		22		7	21
Michigan State		24					25
Minnesota							
Nebraska							
Northwestern							
Ohio State	23						
Penn State							
Purdue			20				16
Rutgers							
Wisconsin							

== Regular season ==
=== 2022 ACC–Big Ten Challenge ACC 8–6 ===
Date	Time	ACC team	B1G team	Score	Location	Television	Attendance	Challenge leader
Nov 28	7:00 p.m.	**Virginia Tech**	Minnesota	67–57	Cassell Coliseum • Blacksburg, Virginia	ESPN2	7,870	ACC 1–0
Nov 28	9:00 p.m.	**Pittsburgh**	Northwestern	87–58	Welsh–Ryan Arena • Evanston, Illinois	ESPN2	2,606	ACC 2–0
Nov 29	7:00 p.m.	Louisville	No. 22 **Maryland**	54–79	KFC Yum! Center • Louisville, Kentucky	ESPN2	12,211	ACC 2–1
Nov 29	7:00 p.m.	**Clemson**	Penn State	101–94^{2OT}	Littlejohn Coliseum • Clemson, South Carolina	ESPNU	5,861	ACC 3–1
Nov 29	7:30 p.m.	Syracuse	No. 16 **Illinois**	44–73	State Farm Center • Champaign, Illinois	ESPN	15,544	ACC 3–2
Nov 29	9:00 p.m.	**Wake Forest**	Wisconsin	78–75	Kohl Center • Madison, Wisconsin	ESPN2	14,435	ACC 4–2
Nov 29	9:00 p.m.	Georgia Tech	**Iowa**	65–81	Carver–Hawkeye Arena • Iowa City, Iowa	ESPNU	10,450	ACC 4–3
Nov 29	9:30 p.m.	No. 3 **Virginia**	Michigan	70–68	Crisler Arena • Ann Arbor, Michigan	ESPN	12,200	ACC 5–3
Nov 30	7:15 p.m.	No. 17 **Duke**	No. 25 Ohio State	81–72	Cameron Indoor Stadium • Durham, North Carolina	ESPN	9,314	ACC 6–3
Nov 30	7:15 p.m.	Florida State	No. 5 **Purdue**	69–79	Donald L. Tucker Civic Center • Tallahassee, Florida	ESPN2	5,282	ACC 6–4
Nov 30	7:15 p.m.	**Miami (FL)**	Rutgers	68–61	Watsco Center • Coral Gables, Florida	ESPNU	5,668	ACC 7–4
Nov 30	9:15 p.m.	No. 18 North Carolina	No. 10 **Indiana**	65–77	Simon Skjodt Assembly Hall • Bloomington, Indiana	ESPN	17,222	ACC 7–5
Nov 30	9:15 p.m.	**Notre Dame**	No. 20 Michigan State	70–52	Joyce Center • South Bend, Indiana	ESPN2	7,854	ACC 8–5
Nov 30	9:15 p.m.	Boston College	**Nebraska**	67–88	Pinnacle Bank Arena • Lincoln, Nebraska	ESPNU	13,080	ACC 8–6
**Winners are in bold** Game times in EST; NC State did not play due to the ACC having one more team than the B1G.

=== 2022 Gavitt Tipoff Games (Big Ten 6–2) ===
Date	Time	Big East team	Big Ten team	Score	Location	Television	Attendance	Leader
Mon., Nov. 14	7:00 PM	**DePaul**	Minnesota	69–53	Williams Arena • Minneapolis, MN	BTN	8,426	Big East (1–0)
Mon., Nov. 14	8:30 PM	Butler	**Penn State**	68–62	Bryce Jordan Center • University Park, PA	FS1	6,762	Tied (1–1)
Tue., Nov. 15	6:30 PM	Georgetown	**Northwestern**	75–63	Capital One Arena • Washington, D.C.	FS1	5,518	Big Ten (2–1)
Tue., Nov. 15	8:30 PM	Marquette	**Purdue**	75–70	Mackey Arena • West Lafayette, IN	FS1	14,876	Big Ten (3–1)
Wed., Nov. 16	7:30 PM	Seton Hall	**Iowa**	83–67	Prudential Center • Newark, NJ	FS1	8,933	Big Ten (4–1)
Thu., Nov. 17	6:30 PM	**St. John's**	Nebraska	70–50	Carnesecca Arena • Queens, NY	FS1	3,933	Big Ten (4–2)
Fri., Nov. 18	6:00 PM	Xavier	**No. 12 Indiana**	81–79	Cintas Center • Cincinnati, OH	FS1	10,586	Big Ten (5-2)
Fri., Nov. 18	8:00 PM	Villanova	**Michigan State**	73–71	Breslin Center • East Lansing, MI	FS1	14,797	Big Ten (6–2)
**WINNERS ARE IN BOLD**. Game Times in EST. Rankings from AP Poll. Did not participate: Connecticut, Creighton, Providence (Big East); Illinois, Maryland, Michigan, Ohio State, Rutgers, Wisconsin (Big Ten)

=== Rankings ===
Legend
	Improvement in ranking
	Drop in ranking
	Not ranked previous week
RV	Received votes but were not ranked in Top 25 of poll
(Italics)	Number of first place votes

		Pre/ Wk 1	Wk 2	Wk 3	Wk 4	Wk 5	Wk 6	Wk 7	Wk 8	Wk 9	Wk 10	Wk 11	Wk 12	Wk 13	Wk 14	Wk 15	Wk 16	Wk 17	Wk 18	Wk 19	Final
Illinois	AP	23	19	16	16	17	18	16	RV	RV	RV	RV	RV	RV	RV	RV	RV				*
Illinois	C	23	20	14	17	17	19	16	22	24	RV	23	RV	25	RV	RV					
Indiana	AP	13	12	11	10	14	14	18	16	15	RV	RV	RV	21	18	14	17	15	19	21	*
Indiana	C	14	13	11	8	11	16	21	18	19	RV	RV	RV	22	18	15	17	13	17	19	24
Iowa	AP	RV	RV	25	RV	RV	RV	RV				RV			RV	RV			RV	RV	*
Iowa	C	RV	RV	24	RV	24	RV	RV	RV	RV		RV			RV	RV	RV		RV	RV	RV
Maryland	AP			23	22	13	20	RV	RV						RV	RV	RV	21	RV		*
Maryland	C			25	22	13	17	23	21	RV	RV				RV	RV	RV	24	RV	RV	RV
Michigan	AP	22	20	RV	RV																*
Michigan	C	22	21	RV	RV																
Michigan State	AP	RV	RV	12	20	RV	RV	RV	RV	RV	RV	RV	RV						RV		*
Michigan State	C	RV	25	15	20	RV	RV	RV	RV	RV	RV	RV	RV	RV					RV	RV	20
Minnesota	AP																				*
Minnesota	C																				
Nebraska	AP																				*
Nebraska	C																				
Northwestern	AP										RV				RV	RV	21	RV	RV	RV	*
Northwestern	C										RV				RV	RV	22	RV	25	RV	RV
Ohio State	AP	RV	RV	RV	25	25	23	RV	RV	24	RV	RV									*
Ohio State	C	RV	RV	RV	25	23	21	RV	RV	23	RV	RV									
Penn State	AP		RV	RV																	*
Penn State	C									RV											RV
Purdue	AP	RV	RV	24	5 (8)	4 (8)	1 (27)	1 (40)	1 (40)	1 (60)	3 (4)	3 (3)	1 (39)	1 (62)	1 (38)	3 (2)	5	5	5	3 (3))	*
Purdue	C	RV	24	23	5 (3)	4 (6)	1 (9)	1 (24)	1 (25)	1 (30)	3 (6)	3 (5)	1 (24)	1 (32)	1 (15)	3 (1)	5	5	3	3 (2)	13
Rutgers	AP	RV	RV			RV					RV	23	RV	RV	24	RV					*
Rutgers	C	RV	RV			RV	RV	RV			RV	RV	RV	RV	RV	RV	RV				
Wisconsin	AP				RV	RV7	22	17	15	13	18	RV	RV								*
Wisconsin	C	RV	RV	RV	RV	RV	23	18	15	15	18	RV	RV								

* AP does not release a post-tournament poll.

=== Early season tournaments ===
Of the 14 Big Ten teams, 12 participated in early season tournaments. All Big Ten teams participated in the ACC–Big Ten Challenge against Atlantic Coast Conference teams, the 22nd and final year for the event. Eight teams participated in the Gavitt Tipoff Games.

Team	Tournament	Finish
Illinois	Continental Tire Main Event	2nd
Iowa	Emerald Coast Classic	2nd
Maryland	Hall of Fame Tip-Off	1st
Michigan	Legends Classic	2nd
Michigan State	Phil Knight Invitational	5th
Minnesota	SoCal Challenge	2nd
Nebraska	ESPN Events Invitational	7th
Northwestern	Cancun Challenge	2nd
Ohio State	Maui Invitational	5th
Penn State	Charleston Classic	3rd
Purdue	Phil Knight Legacy	1st
Wisconsin	Battle 4 Atlantis	3rd

=== Players of the week ===
Throughout the conference regular season, the Big Ten offices named one or two players of the week and one or two freshmen of the week each Monday.

Week	Player of the week	Freshman of the week
November 14, 2022	Hunter Dickinson, Michigan	Jett Howard, Michigan
November 21, 2022	Terrence Shannon Jr., Illinois	Braden Smith, Purdue
November 28, 2022	Zach Edey, Purdue	Fletcher Loyer, Purdue
December 5, 2022	Zach Edey (2), Purdue	Fletcher Loyer (2), Purdue
December 5, 2022	Kris Murray, Iowa	Fletcher Loyer (2), Purdue
December 12, 2022	Zach Edey (3), Purdue	Dug McDaniel, Michigan
December 19, 2022	Filip Rebrača, Iowa	Brice Sensabaugh, Ohio State
December 27, 2022	Jalen Pickett, Penn State	Brice Sensabaugh (2), Ohio State
January 3, 2023	Hunter Dickinson (2), Michigan	Brice Sensabaugh (3), Ohio State
January 9, 2023	Zach Edey (4), Purdue	Jalen Hood-Schifino, Indiana
January 17, 2023	Fletcher Loyer, Purdue	Fletcher Loyer (3), Purdue
January 17, 2023	Cam Spencer, Rutgers	Fletcher Loyer (3), Purdue
January 23, 2023	Trayce Jackson-Davis, Indiana	Brice Sensabaugh (4), Ohio State
January 30, 2023	Zach Edey (5), Purdue	Jalen Hood-Schifino (2), Indiana
January 30, 2023	Trayce Jackson-Davis (2), Indiana	Jalen Hood-Schifino (2), Indiana
February 6, 2023	Zach Edey (6), Purdue	Jayden Epps, Illinois
February 6, 2023	Trayce Jackson-Davis (3), Indiana	Jayden Epps, Illinois
February 13, 2023	Boo Buie, Northwestern	Jalen Hood-Schifino (3), Indiana
February 13, 2023	Trayce Jackson-Davis (4), Indiana	Jalen Hood-Schifino (3), Indiana
February 20, 2023	Jalen Pickett (2), Penn State	No nominees
February 27, 2023	Jalen Hood-Schifino, Indiana	Jalen Hood-Schifino (4), Indiana
March 6, 2023	Trayce Jackson-Davis (5), Indiana	Jamarques Lawrence, Nebraska
March 6, 2023	Camren Wynter, Penn State	Jamarques Lawrence, Nebraska

=== Conference matrix ===
This table summarizes the head-to-head results between teams in conference play. Each team was scheduled to play 20 conference games, and at least one game against each opponent. However, the February 15 game between Michigan State and Minnesota was canceled due to the Michigan State shooting, meaning those teams would only play 19 conference games.

	Illinois	Indiana	Iowa	Maryland	Michigan	Michigan St	Minnesota	Nebraska	Northwestern	Ohio St	Penn St	Purdue	Rutgers	Wisconsin
vs. Illinois	–	2–0	1–0	1–0	0–1	0–1	0–2	0–2	1–1	1–1	2–0	1–0	0–1	0–2
vs. Indiana	0–2	–	2–0	1–0	0–2	1–1	0–1	0–1	2–0	0–1	1–0	0–2	1–1	0–1
vs. Iowa	0–1	0–2	–	0–1	0–1	1–1	0–1	2–0	1–1	1–1	1–0	1–0	0–2	2–0
vs. Maryland	0–1	0–1	1–0	–	1–1	1–0	0–2	1–1	0–1	1–1	1–1	1–1	1–0	1–1
vs. Michigan	1–0	2–0	1–0	1–1	–	1–1	0–2	0–1	0–2	0–1	1–1	1–0	0–1	1–1
vs. Michigan St	1–0	1–1	1–1	0–1	1–1	–	0–0	0–2	1–0	0–2	0–1	2–0	1–1	0–1
vs. Minnesota	2–0	1–0	1–0	2–0	2–0	0–0	–	2–0	1–0	0–1	1–0	2–0	1–1	2–0
vs. Nebraska	2–0	1–0	0–2	1–1	1–0	2–0	0–2	–	1–0	0–1	1–1	2–0	0–1	0–1
vs. Northwestern	1–1	0–2	1–1	1–0	2–0	0–1	0–1	0–1	–	1–1	1–0	0–1	1–1	0–2
vs. Ohio State	1–1	1–0	1–1	1–1	1–0	2–0	1–0	1–0	1–1	–	1–0	2–0	1–1	1–0
vs. Penn State	0–2	0–1	0–1	1–1	1–1	1–0	0–1	1–1	0–1	0–1	–	2–0	2–0	2–0
vs. Purdue	0–1	2–0	0–1	1–1	0–1	0–2	0–2	0–2	1–0	0–2	0–2	–	1–0	0–1
vs. Rutgers	1–0	1–1	2–0	0–1	1–0	1–1	1–1	1–0	1–1	1–1	0–2	0–1	–	0–1
vs. Wisconsin	2–0	1–0	0–2	1–1	1–1	1–0	0–2	1–0	2–0	0–1	0–2	1–0	1–0	–
Total	**11–9**	**12–8**	**11–9**	**11–9**	**11–9**	**11–8**	**2–17**	**9–11**	**12–8**	**5–15**	**10–10**	**15–5**	**10–10**	**9–11**

The Big Ten Conference led the nation in average attendance with 12,063 fans per game, which outpaced the SEC (11,344), Big 12 (10,703), ACC (9,949) and Big East (9,907). Indiana (6th), Illinois (9th), Wisconsin (11th), Maryland (13th), Purdue (14th), Iowa (24th), Michigan (27th), Nebraska (28th) and Ohio State (30th) were among the top schools in terms of total attendance.

== Honors and awards ==
=== All-Big Ten awards and teams ===
On March 7, 2023, the Big Ten announced most of its conference awards.

Honor	Coaches	Media
Player of the Year	Zach Edey, Purdue	Zach Edey, Purdue
Coach of the Year	Chris Collins, Northwestern	Chris Collins, Northwestern
Freshman of the Year	Jalen Hood-Schifino, Indiana	Jalen Hood-Schifino, Indiana
Co-Defensive Players of the Year	Chase Audige, Northwestern	Not selected
Co-Defensive Players of the Year	Caleb McConnell, Rutgers	Not selected
Sixth Man of the Year	Payton Sandfort, Iowa	Not selected
All-Big Ten First Team	Zach Edey, Purdue	Zach Edey, Purdue
All-Big Ten First Team	Trayce Jackson-Davis, Indiana	Trayce Jackson-Davis, Indiana
All-Big Ten First Team	Kris Murray, Iowa	Kris Murray, Iowa
All-Big Ten First Team	Jalen Pickett, Penn State	Jalen Pickett, Penn State
All-Big Ten First Team	Terrence Shannon Jr., Illinois	Boo Buie, Northwestern
All-Big Ten First Team	Not selected	Hunter Dickinson, Michigan
All-Big Ten Second Team	Chase Audige, Northwestern	Jalen Hood-Schifino, Indiana
All-Big Ten Second Team	Boo Buie, Northwestern	Clifford Omoruyi, Rutgers
All-Big Ten Second Team	Hunter Dickinson, Michigan	Terrence Shannon Jr., Illinois
All-Big Ten Second Team	Derrick Walker, Nebraska	Tyson Walker, Michigan State
All-Big Ten Second Team	Tyson Walker, Michigan State	Jahmir Young, Maryland
All-Big Ten Second Team	Jahmir Young, Maryland	Not selected
All-Big Ten Third Team	Kobe Bufkin, Michigan	Chase Audige, Northwestern
All-Big Ten Third Team	Jalen Hood-Schifino, Indiana	A.J. Hoggard, Michigan State
All-Big Ten Third Team	Jett Howard, Michigan	Matthew Mayer, Illinois
All-Big Ten Third Team	Matthew Mayer, Illinois	Filip Rebrača, Iowa
All-Big Ten Third Team	Clifford Omoruyi, Rutgers	Brice Sensabaugh, Ohio State
All-Big Ten Honorable Mention	Andrew Funk, Penn State	Connor McCaffery, Iowa
All-Big Ten Honorable Mention	Dawson Garcia, Minnesota	Tony Perkins, Iowa
All-Big Ten Honorable Mention	Hakim Hart, Maryland	Julian Reese, Maryland
All-Big Ten Honorable Mention	Joey Hauser, Michigan State	Hakim Hart, Maryland
All-Big Ten Honorable Mention	Chucky Hepburn, Wisconsin	Kobe Bufkin, Michigan
All-Big Ten Honorable Mention	A.J. Hoggard, Michigan State	Jett Howard, Michigan
All-Big Ten Honorable Mention	Zed Key, Ohio State	Joey Hauser, Michigan State
All-Big Ten Honorable Mention	Fletcher Loyer, Purdue	Dawson Garcia, Minnesota
All-Big Ten Honorable Mention	Seth Lundy, Penn State	Keisei Tominaga, Nebraska
All-Big Ten Honorable Mention	Connor McCaffery, Iowa	Derrick Walker, Nebraska
All-Big Ten Honorable Mention	Caleb McConnell, Rutgers	Andrew Funk, Penn State
All-Big Ten Honorable Mention	Paul Mulcahy, Rutgers	Seth Lundy, Penn State
All-Big Ten Honorable Mention	Tony Perkins, Iowa	Braden Smith, Purdue
All-Big Ten Honorable Mention	Filip Rebrača, Iowa	Fletcher Loyer, Purdue
All-Big Ten Honorable Mention	Julian Reese, Maryland	Caleb McConnell, Rutgers
All-Big Ten Honorable Mention	Donta Scott, Maryland	Paul Mulcahy, Rutgers
All-Big Ten Honorable Mention	Brice Sensabaugh, Ohio State	Cam Spencer, Rutgers
All-Big Ten Honorable Mention	Braden Smith, Purdue	Chucky Hepburn, Wisconsin
All-Big Ten Honorable Mention	Cam Spencer, Rutgers	Not selected
All-Big Ten Honorable Mention	Justice Sueing, Ohio State	Not selected
All-Big Ten Honorable Mention	Keisei Tominaga, Nebraska	Not selected
All-Freshman Team	Connor Essegian, Wisconsin	Not selected
All-Freshman Team	Jalen Hood-Schifino, Indiana	Not selected
All-Freshman Team	Jett Howard, Michigan	Not selected
All-Freshman Team	Brice Sensabaugh, Ohio State	Not selected
All-Freshman Team	Braden Smith, Purdue	Not selected
All-Defensive Team	Chase Audige, Northwestern	Not selected
All-Defensive Team	Zach Edey, Purdue	Not selected
All-Defensive Team	Trayce Jackson-Davis, Indiana	Not selected
All-Defensive Team	Caleb McConnell, Rutgers	Not selected
All-Defensive Team	Clifford Omoruyi, Rutgers	Not selected

== Postseason ==
=== Big Ten tournament ===
First round Wednesday, March 8 BTN/Fox Sports App
12	Wisconsin	57
13	Ohio State	65
11	Nebraska	75
14	Minnesota	78

Second round Thursday, March 9 BTN/Fox Sports App
8	Michigan	50
9	Rutgers	62
5	Iowa	69
13	Ohio State	73
7	Illinois	76
10	Penn State	79
6	Maryland	70
14	Minnesota	54

Quarterfinals; Friday, March 10; BTN/Fox Sports App
1	Purdue	70
9	Rutgers	65
4	Michigan State	58
13	Ohio State	68
2	Northwestern	65
10	Penn State	67*
3	Indiana	70
6	Maryland	60

Semifinals; Saturday, March 11; CBS/Paramount+
1	Purdue	80
13	Ohio State	66
10	Penn State	77
3	Indiana	73

Championship; Sunday, March 12; CBS/Paramount+
1	Purdue	67
10	Penn State	65

* denotes overtime period

=== NCAA Tournament ===
The winner of the Big Ten Tournament, Purdue, received the conference's automatic bid to the NCAA tournament. Eight Big Ten teams received bids to the NCAA tournament, tied with the SEC for the most of any conference in the tournament.

Seed	Region	School	First Four	First round	Second round	Sweet Sixteen	Elite Eight	Final Four	Championship
1	East	Purdue	N/A	lost to (16) Fairleigh Dickinson 58–63					
4	Midwest	Indiana	N/A	defeated (13) Kent State 71–60	lost to (5) Miami (FL) 69–85				
7	East	Michigan State	N/A	defeated (10) USC 72–62	defeated (2) Marquette 69–60	lost to (3) Kansas State 93–98			
7	West	Northwestern	N/A	defeated (10) Boise State 75–67	lost to (2) UCLA 63–68				
8	Midwest	Iowa	N/A	lost to (9) Auburn 75–83					
8	South	Maryland	N/A	defeated (9) West Virginia 67–65	lost to (1) Alabama 51–73				
9	West	Illinois	N/A	lost to (8) Arkansas 63–73					
10	Midwest	Penn State	N/A	defeated (7) Texas A&M 76–59	lost to (2) Texas 66–71				
		W–L (%):	0–0 (–)	5–3 (.625)	1–4 (.200)	0–1 (.000)	0–0 (–)	0–0 (–)	0–0 (–) Total: 6–8 (.429)

=== National Invitation Tournament ===
Three Big Ten teams received invitations to the National Invitation Tournament.

Seed	School	First round	Second round	Quarterfinals	Semifinals	Finals
1	Rutgers	lost to Hofstra 86–88				
2	Wisconsin	defeated Bradley 81–62	defeated (3) Liberty 75–71	defeated (1) Oregon 61–58	lost to (2) North Texas 54–56	
3	Michigan	defeated Toledo 90–80	lost to (2) Vanderbilt 65–66			
	W–L (%):	2–1 (.667)	1–1 (.500)	1–0 (1.000)	0–1 (.000)	0–0 (–) Total: 4–3 (.571)

=== 2023 NBA draft ===
Eight Big Ten athletes were selected in the 2023 NBA draft.

Rnd.	Pick	Player	Pos.	Nationality (Note: Nationality indicates the player's national team or representative nationality. If a player has not competed at the international level, then the nationality indicates the national team which the player is eligible to represent according to FIBA rules.)	Team	School / club team
1	11	Jett Howard	SF	United States	Orlando Magic (from Chicago) (Note: March 25, 2021: Chicago Bulls to Orlando Magic: Orlando acquired Wendell Carter Jr., Otto Porter Jr., 2021 and 2023 first-round picks; Chicago acquired Nikola Vučević and Al-Farouq Aminu)	Michigan (Fr.)
1	15	Kobe Bufkin	SG	United States	Atlanta Hawks	Michigan (So.)
1	17	Jalen Hood-Schifino	PG/SG	United States	Los Angeles Lakers	Indiana (Fr.)
1	23	Kris Murray	PF	United States	Portland Trail Blazers (from New York) (Note: February 8, 2023: New York Knicks to Portland Trail Blazers (four-team trade with Philadelphia 76ers and Charlotte Hornets): Portland acquired Cam Reddish, Ryan Arcidiacono, Matisse Thybulle, and New York's lottery-protected 2023 first-round pick; New York acquired Josh Hart; Philadelphia acquired Jalen McDaniels, New York's 2024 second-round pick, and Portland's 2029 second-round pick; Charlotte acquired Svi Mykhailiuk, the most favorable of Atlanta's, Charlotte's, and Brooklyn's 2023 second-round picks, and Portland's 2027 second-round pick)	Iowa (Jr.)
1	28	Brice Sensabaugh	SF	United States	Utah Jazz (from Philadelphia via Brooklyn) (Note: February 10, 2022: Philadelphia 76ers to Brooklyn Nets: Brooklyn acquired Ben Simmons, Seth Curry, Andre Drummond, a 2022 first-round pick with the right to defer to 2023 (which was exercised), and a protected 2027 first-round pick; Philadelphia acquired James Harden and Paul Millsap; June 30, 2022: Brooklyn Nets to Utah Jazz: Utah acquired a 2023 first-round draft pick (the least favorable of Brooklyn, Houston, and Philadelphia); Brooklyn acquired Royce O'Neale)	Ohio State (Fr.)
2	32	Jalen Pickett	SG	United States	Indiana Pacers (from Houston, (Note: January 13, 2021: Houston Rockets to Indiana Pacers (four-team trade with Brooklyn Nets and Cleveland Cavaliers): Indiana acquired Caris LeVert and Houston's 2023 second-round pick; Houston acquired Milwaukee's 2022 first-round pick, Brooklyn's first-found picks in 2022, 2024, and 2026, and the rights to swap first-round picks with Brooklyn in 2021, 2023, 2025, and 2027; Brooklyn acquired James Harden and Cleveland's 2024 second-round pick; Cleveland acquired Jarrett Allen and Taurean Prince) traded to Denver) (Note: June 23, 2023: Indiana Pacers to Denver Nuggets (four-team trade with LA Lakers and Oklahoma City): LA Lakers acquired the draft rights to Maxwell Lewis; Denver acquired the draft rights to Julian Strawther, the draft rights to Jalen Pickett, the draft rights to Hunter Tyson, and a 2024 second round pick; Indiana acquired the draft rights to Mojave King, a 2024 first round pick (from Oklahoma City via Denver), and cash consideration; Oklahoma City acquired a 2029 first round pick)	Penn State (Sr.)
2	46	Seth Lundy	SG	United States	Atlanta Hawks (from New Orleans) (Note: July 6, 2019: Atlanta Hawks to New Orleans Pelicans: New Orleans Pelicans acquired the draft rights to Jaxson Hayes, Nickeil Alexander-Walker and Marcos Louzada Silva, 2021 and 2022 second-round picks; Atlanta acquired Solomon Hill, the draft rights to De'Andre Hunter and Jordan Bone, and a 2023 second-round pick)	Penn State (Sr.)
2	57	Trayce Jackson-Davis	PF	United States	Washington Wizards (from Boston via Charlotte, (Note: November 29, 2020: Boston Celtics to Charlotte Hornets: Charlotte acquired Gordon Hayward and 2023 and 2024 second-round picks; Boston acquired a protected 2022 second-round pick; February 10, 2022: Charlotte Hornets to Washington Wizards: Washington acquired Ish Smith, Vernon Carey Jr., and a conditional second-round draft pick in 2023 or 2024 originally from Boston; Charlotte acquired Montrezl Harrell) traded to Golden State) (Note: June 22, 2023: Washington Wizards to Golden State Warriors: Golden State acquired the draft rights to Trayce Jackson-Davis; Washington acquired cash considerations)	Indiana (Sr.)

==== Pre-draft trades ====
Prior to the draft, the following trades were made and resulted in exchanges of draft picks between teams.

==== Post-draft trades ====
Post-draft trades are made after the draft begins. These trades are usually not confirmed until the next day or after free agency officially begins.
