= Payton Sandfort =

American basketball player (born 2002)

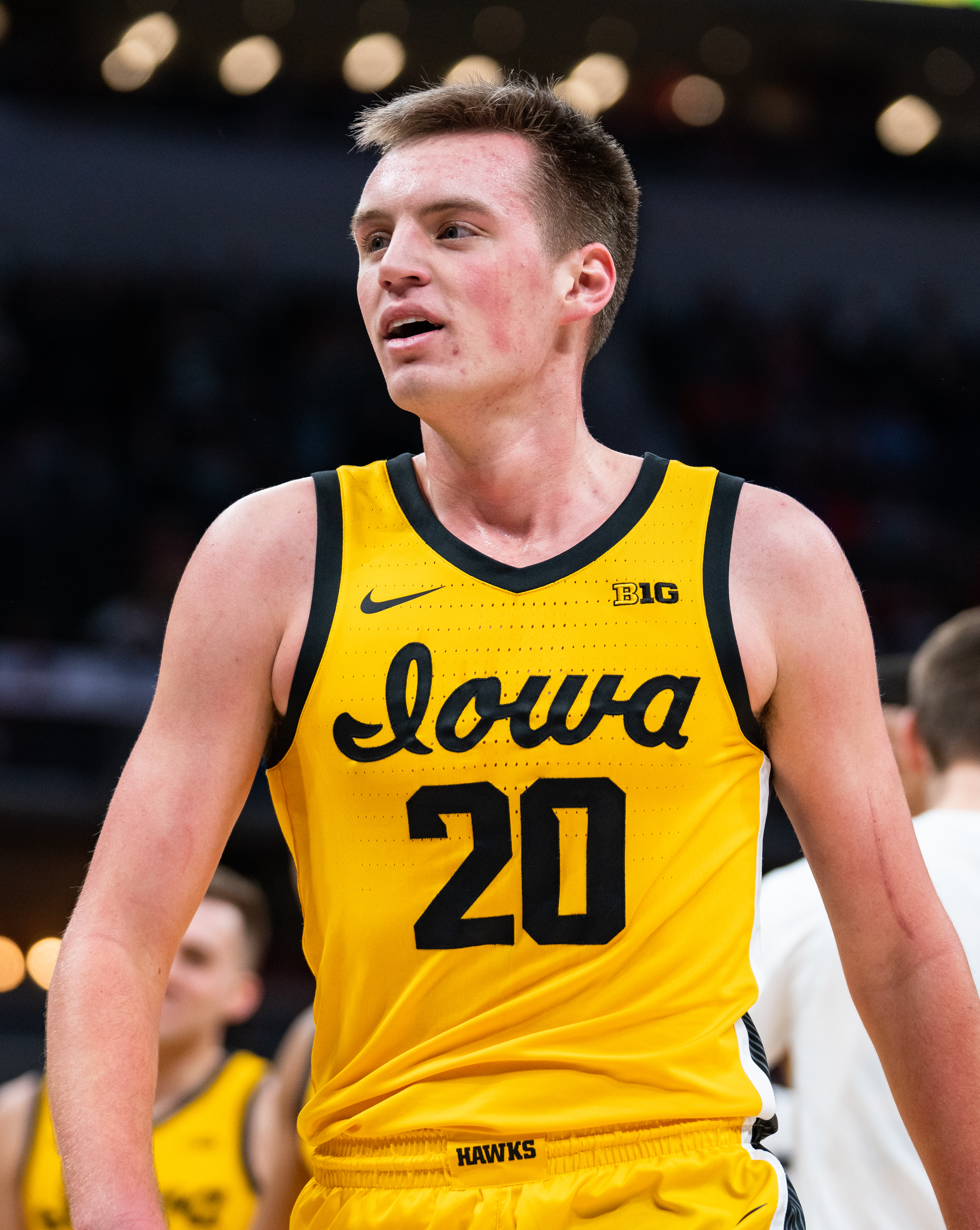
- Sandfort with Iowa in 2022

No. 20 – Iowa Wolves
- Position: Small forward
- League: NBA G League

Personal information
- Born: July 12, 2002 (age 24) Waukee, Iowa, U.S.
- Listed height: 6 ft 7 in (2.01 m)
- Listed weight: 215 lb (98 kg)

Career information
- High school: Waukee (Waukee, Iowa)
- College: Iowa (2021–2025)
- NBA draft: 2025: undrafted
- Playing career: 2025–present

Career history
- 2025–2026: Oklahoma City Blue
- 2025–2026: Oklahoma City Thunder
- 2026: →Oklahoma City Blue
- 2026–present: Iowa Wolves

Career highlights
- Third-team All-Big Ten (2024); Second-team Academic All-American (2024); Big Ten Sixth Man of the Year (2023)
- Stats at NBA.com
- Stats at Basketball Reference

Payton A. Sandfort (born July 12, 2002) is an American professional basketball player for the Iowa Wolves of the NBA G League. He played college basketball for the Iowa Hawkeyes, and has appeared in the National Basketball Association (NBA) in four games, all with the Oklahoma City Thunder.

== Early life ==
Sandfort grew up in Waukee, Iowa and attended Waukee High School, where he played basketball and golf. He averaged 19.8 points, 8.7 rebounds, and four assists as a junior. Sandfort was named the Iowa Basketball Coaches Association 4A Player of the Year after averaging 16.6 points, 7.7 rebounds, and 3.1 assists during his senior season. He also helped Waukee to a state championship in golf as a senior. Sandfort was rated a three-star recruit and committed to playing college basketball for Iowa over offers from Stanford, Utah, Minnesota, Drake, Air Force, and Loyola Chicago.

== College career ==
Sandfort served as a role player off of the bench for the Iowa Hawkeyes as a freshman. He played in 34 games and finished the season averaging five points and 1.9 rebounds per game. Sandfort grew one inch between his freshman and sophomore years. He entered his sophomore season as the Hawkeyes' starting shooting guard. Sandfort was moved to the bench due to poor shooting. At the end of the regular season, he was named the Big Ten Conference Sixth Man of the Year.

Sandfort averaged averaged 16.4 points, 6.6 rebounds and 2.7 assists per game as a junior, while shooting 44.6 percent from the field. He was named third-team All-Big Ten. He declared for the 2024 NBA draft before opting to return to Iowa. As a senior, Sandfort averaged 16.7 points, 6.0 rebounds and 2.9 assists per game. He finished his Iowa career with 1,619 points, 622 rebounds and 256 assists.

== Professional career ==
After not being selected in the 2025 NBA draft, Sandfort signed with the Oklahoma City Thunder. He was waived on October 13, 2025, in order to join their G League affiliate the Oklahoma City Blue. On March 2, 2026, Sandfort signed a two-way contract with the Thunder. On April 12, Sandfort recorded a career-high 23 points with five three-pointers during a 103–135 loss to the Phoenix Suns. He made four appearances for the Thunder during his rookie campaign, posting averages of 8.8 points and 2.5 rebounds. On July 2, Sandfort was waived by Oklahoma City.

== Career statistics ==
Legend
GP	Games played	GS	Games started	MPG	Minutes per game
FG%	Field goal percentage	3P%	3-point field goal percentage	FT%	Free throw percentage
RPG	Rebounds per game	APG	Assists per game	SPG	Steals per game
BPG	Blocks per game	PPG	Points per game	**Bold**	Career high

=== NBA ===
Year	Team	GP	GS	MPG	FG%	3P%	FT%	RPG	APG	SPG	BPG	PPG
2025–26	Oklahoma City	4	0	15.8	.500	.412	.500	2.5	.0	.3	.0	8.8
Career		4	0	15.8	.500	.412	.500	2.5	.0	.3	.0	8.8

=== College ===
Year	Team	GP	GS	MPG	FG%	3P%	FT%	RPG	APG	SPG	BPG	PPG
2021–22	Iowa	**34**	0	10.5	.418	.366	**.938**	1.9	.6	.1	.1	5.0
2022–23	Iowa	33	7	20.8	.404	.343	.864	4.1	1.5	.6	.2	10.3
2023–24	Iowa	**34**	**34**	30.5	**.446**	**.379**	.911	**6.6**	2.7	.7	.4	16.4
2024–25	Iowa	33	33	**31.9**	.407	.340	.891	6.0	**2.9**	**.8**	**.7**	**16.7**
Career		134	74	23.4	.420	.357	.896	4.6	1.9	.6	.4	12.1

== Personal life ==
Sandfort's younger brother, Pryce, plays basketball at Nebraska. His mother Gretchen played basketball at Simpson College. His father Brian played basketball at Hastings College.

On August 15, 2026 he married his college sweetheart, Brooklyn McKee.
