= 2022–23 Illinois Fighting Illini men's basketball team =

American college basketball season

2022–23 Illinois Fighting Illini men's basketball

NCAA tournament, First Round
- Conference: Big Ten Conference
- Record: 20–13 (11–9 Big Ten)
- Head coach: Brad Underwood (6th season)
- Assistant coaches: Chester Frazier (2nd season); Tim Anderson (2nd season); Geoff Alexander (2nd season)
- Captains: Luke Goode; Coleman Hawkins
- Home arena: State Farm Center

2022–23 Big Ten Conference men's basketball standings
	Conf.				Overall
Team	W		L	PCT	W		L	PCT
No. 3 Purdue †	15	–	5	.750	29	–	6	.829
No. 21 Indiana	12	–	8	.600	23	–	12	.657
Northwestern	12	–	8	.600	22	–	12	.647
Michigan State	11	–	8	.579	21	–	13	.618
Maryland	11	–	9	.550	22	–	13	.629
Illinois	11	–	9	.550	20	–	13	.606
Iowa	11	–	9	.550	19	–	14	.576
Michigan	11	–	9	.550	18	–	16	.529
Penn State	10	–	10	.500	23	–	14	.622
Rutgers	10	–	10	.500	19	–	15	.559
Wisconsin	9	–	11	.450	20	–	15	.571
Nebraska	9	–	11	.450	16	–	16	.500
Ohio State	5	–	15	.250	16	–	19	.457
Minnesota	2	–	17	.105	9	–	22	.290
† Conference tournament winner Rankings from AP poll

The 2022–23 Illinois Fighting Illini men's basketball team represented the University of Illinois in the 2022–23 NCAA Division I men's basketball season. Led by sixth-year head coach Brad Underwood, the Illini played their home games at the State Farm Center in Champaign, Illinois as members of the Big Ten Conference. They finished the season 20–11, 11–9 in Big Ten play to finish in a four-way tie in fifth place. As the No. 7 seed in the Big Ten tournament, they were defeated by Penn State in the second round. They received an at-large bid to the NCAA tournament as the No. 9 seed in the West Region, where they lost to Arkansas in the First Round.

== Previous season ==
The Illini finished the 2021–22 season 23–10, 15–5 in Big Ten play to finish in a tie for the regular season championship. As the No. 1 seed in the Big Ten tournament, they were defeated by No. 9 seed Indiana in the quarterfinals. They received an at-large bid to the NCAA tournament as the No. 4 seed in the South Region, where they defeated Chattanooga in the First Round before losing to Houston in the Second Round.

== Offseason ==
In a preseason scrimmage, Luke Goode broke his foot. He missed most of the season prior to returning in February.

=== Departures ===
Name	Number	Pos.	Height	Weight	Year	Hometown	Notes	Reference
Benjamin Bosmans-Verdonk	13	F	6'8"	235	Redshirt Sophomore	Lommel, Belgium	Transferred to South Carolina	
Kofi Cockburn	21	C	7'0"	285	Junior	Kingston, Jamaica	Declared for 2022 NBA draft, went undrafted, signed with Utah Jazz	
André Curbelo	5	G	6'1"	175	Sophomore	Vega Baja, Puerto Rico	Transferred to St. John's	
Trent Frazier	11	G	6'2"	175	Senior	Wellington, Florida	Graduated, signed with KK FMP	
Jacob Grandison	3	G/F	6'6"	210	Graduate Student	Oakland, California	Transferred to Duke	
Austin Hutcherson	22	G	6'6"	190	Graduate Student	New York City, New York	Graduated	
Omar Payne	4	F	6'10"	240	Junior	Kissimmee, Florida	Transferred to Jacksonville	
Alfonso Plummer	11	G	6'1"	180	Graduate Student	Fajardo, Puerto Rico	Graduated	
Brandin Podziemski	0	G	6'5"	200	Freshman	Muskego, Wisconsin	Transferred to Santa Clara	
Da'Monte Williams	20	G	6'3"	215	Senior	Peoria, Illinois	Graduated, signed with U.D. Oliveirense	

=== Incoming transfers ===
Name	Number	Pos.	Height	Weight	Year	Hometown	Previous School
Dain Dainja	42	F	6'9"	270	Redshirt Sophomore	Brooklyn Park, Minnesota	Baylor
Matthew Mayer	24	G/F	6'9"	225	Graduate Student	Austin, Texas	Baylor
Terrence Shannon Jr.	0	G	6'6"	215	Senior	Chicago, Illinois	Texas Tech

=== 2022 recruiting class ===
College recruiting information
Name	Hometown	School	Height	Weight	Commit date
Skyy Clark; PG	Nashville, Tennessee	Montverde Academy	6 ft 3 in (1.91 m)	210 lb (95 kg)	Apr 7, 2022
Skyy Clark; PG	Recruit ratings: Rivals: 247Sports: On3: ESPN: (89)				
Jayden Epps; CG	Suffolk, Virginia	Combine Academy	6 ft 2 in (1.88 m)	195 lb (88 kg)	Jul 13, 2021
Jayden Epps; CG	Recruit ratings: Rivals: 247Sports: On3: ESPN: (83)				
Sencire Harris; SG	Akron, Ohio	St. Vincent–St. Mary High School	6 ft 3 in (1.91 m)	180 lb (82 kg)	Jul 3, 2021
Sencire Harris; SG	Recruit ratings: Rivals: 247Sports: On3: ESPN: (81)				
Ty Rodgers; SF / PF	Grand Blanc, Michigan	Thornton Township High School	6 ft 6 in (1.98 m)	210 lb (95 kg)	Nov 17, 2021
Ty Rodgers; SF / PF	Recruit ratings: Rivals: 247Sports: On3: ESPN: (85)				
Zacharie Perrin; PF	Grandfontaine, France	Sunrise Christian (Kan.)	6 ft 10 in (2.08 m)	220 lb (100 kg)	Jul 27, 2022
Zacharie Perrin; PF	Recruit ratings: Rivals: 247Sports: On3: ESPN: (77)				
Niccolo Moretti; PG	Bologna, Italy	NBA Global Academy (Australia)	6 ft 0 in (1.83 m)	150 lb (68 kg)	Jan 11, 2023
Niccolo Moretti; PG	Recruit ratings: No ratings found				
Overall recruit ranking: Rivals: 6 247Sports: 7 On3: 12
Note: In many cases, Scout, Rivals, 247Sports, On3, and ESPN may conflict in their listings of height and weight.; In these cases, the average was taken. ESPN grades are on a 100-point scale.; Sources: "2022 Illinois Commits". Rivals.; "ESPN- Illinois Fighting Illini Men's Basketball Recruiting". ESPN.; "2022 Team Ranking". Rivals.; "2022–23 Illinois Fighting Illini men's basketball team". 247Sports.; "2022–23 Illinois Fighting Illini men's basketball team". On3.

== Roster ==
2022–23 Illinois Fighting Illini men's basketball team
Players
Coaches

Pos.	#	Name	Height	Weight	Year	Previous school	Hometown
G	0	Terrence Shannon Jr.	6 ft 6 in (1.98 m)	215 lb (98 kg)	Sr	IMG Academy / Texas Tech	Chicago, Illinois
G	1	Sencire Harris	6 ft 4 in (1.93 m)	160 lb (73 kg)	Fr	St. Vincent–St. Mary	North Canton, Ohio
F	2	Connor Serven (W)	6 ft 9 in (2.06 m)	235 lb (107 kg)	Jr	St. Rita	Bushnell, Illinois
G	3	Jayden Epps	6 ft 2 in (1.88 m)	190 lb (86 kg)	Fr	Combine Academy	Suffolk, Virginia
G	5	AJ Redd (W)	6 ft 3 in (1.91 m)	160 lb (73 kg)	Fr	St. Ignatius	Chicago, Illinois
G	10	Luke Goode (C)	6 ft 7 in (2.01 m)	210 lb (95 kg)	So	Homestead	Fort Wayne, Indiana
G	11	Niccolo Moretti (redshirt)	6 ft 1 in (1.85 m)	160 lb (73 kg)	Fr	NBA Global Academy (Australia)	Bologna, Italy
C	12	Brandon Lieb	7 ft 0 in (2.13 m)	220 lb (100 kg)	Jr	Deerfield	Deerfield, Illinois
G	15	RJ Meléndez	6 ft 7 in (2.01 m)	205 lb (93 kg)	So	Central Pointe Christian Academy	Arecibo, Puerto Rico
G/F	20	Ty Rodgers	6 ft 6 in (1.98 m)	220 lb (100 kg)	Fr	Thornton Township	Saginaw, Michigan
G	22	Paxton Warden (W)	6 ft 4 in (1.93 m)	180 lb (82 kg)	Fr	Glenbard West	Glen Ellyn, Illinois
G/F	24	Matthew Mayer	6 ft 9 in (2.06 m)	225 lb (102 kg)	GS	Westlake / Baylor	Austin, Texas
F	25	Zacharie Perrin (redshirt)	6 ft 10 in (2.08 m)	220 lb (100 kg)	Fr	Sunrise Christian (Kan.)	Grandfontaine, France
F	33	Coleman Hawkins (C)	6 ft 10 in (2.08 m)	225 lb (102 kg)	Jr	Prolific Prep	Sacramento, California
F	42	Dain Dainja	6 ft 9 in (2.06 m)	270 lb (122 kg)	RS So	Park Center / Baylor	Brooklyn Park, Minnesota
G	55	Skyy Clark	6 ft 3 in (1.91 m)	200 lb (91 kg)	Fr	Montverde Academy	Los Angeles, California

Head coach

- Brad Underwood (Kansas State)

Assistant coach(es)

- Chester Frazier (Illinois)
- Tim Anderson (Oklahoma Panhandle State)
- Geoff Alexander (Western Illinois)

Legend

- (C) Team captain
- (S) Suspended
- (I) Ineligible
- (W) Walk-on
- Injured
- Current redshirt

Roster
Last update: 6/25/2023

Note: Skyy Clark and Zacharie Perrin left the team mid-season and were removed from the official Illini Roster page.

== Schedule and results ==
Date time, TV	Rank^{#}	Opponent^{#}	Result	Record	High points	High rebounds	High assists	Site (attendance) city, state
Exhibition
October 28, 2022*; 7:00 p.m., B1G+	No. 23	Quincy	W 87–52	–	15 – Tied	12 – Hawkins	3 – Tied	State Farm Center (15,051); Champaign, IL
Regular Season
November 7, 2022*; 8:00 p.m., ESPNU	No. 23	Eastern Illinois	W 87–57	1–0	24 – Shannon	12 – Hawkins	5 – Rodgers	State Farm Center (12,938); Champaign, IL
November 11, 2022*; 8:00 p.m., BTN	No. 23	Kansas City	W 86–48	2–0	20 – Dainja	15 – Dainja	5 – Shannon Jr.	State Farm Center (15,331); Champaign, IL
November 14, 2022*; 7:00 p.m., BTN	No. 19	Monmouth; Continental Tire Main Event campus site game	W 103–65	3–0	30 – Shannon Jr.	8 – Shannon Jr.	6 – Clark	State Farm Center (13,772); Champaign, IL
November 18, 2022*; 8:30 p.m., ESPNU	No. 19	vs. No. 8 UCLA; Continental Tire Main Event semifinal	W 79–70	4–0	29 – Shannon Jr.	10 – Shannon Jr.	7 – Hawkins	T-Mobile Arena (8,707); Paradise, NV
November 20, 2022*; 2:00 p.m., ESPN	No. 19	vs. No. 16 Virginia; Continental Tire Main Event championship	L 61–70	4–1	14 – Epps	6 – Dainja	6 – Shannon Jr.	T-Mobile Arena; Paradise, NV
November 25, 2022*; 8:00 p.m., B1G+	No. 16	Lindenwood	W 92–59	5–1	19 – Clark	9 – Mayer	4 – Clark	State Farm Center (12,552); Champaign, IL
November 29, 2022*; 6:30 p.m., ESPN	No. 16	Syracuse; ACC/B1G Challenge	W 73–44	6–1	17 – Shannon Jr.	10 – Hawkins	10 – Hawkins	State Farm Center (15,544); Champaign, IL
December 2, 2022; 8:00 p.m., BTN	No. 16	at No. 22 Maryland	L 66–71	6–2 (0–1)	19 – Shannon Jr.	7 – Tied	3 – Shannon Jr.	Xfinity Center (16,380); College Park, MD
December 6, 2022*; 6:00 p.m., ESPN	No. 17	vs. No. 2 Texas; Jimmy V Classic	W 85–78 ^{OT}	7–2	21 – Mayer	7 – Hawkins	4 – Hawkins	Madison Square Garden (17,828); New York, NY
December 10, 2022; 11:00 a.m., BTN	No. 17	Penn State	L 59–74	7–3 (0–2)	14 – Mayer	7 – Tied	6 – Hawkins	State Farm Center (15,544); Champaign, IL
December 17, 2022*; 3:00 p.m., BTN	No. 18	Alabama A&M	W 68–47	8–3	21 – Mayer	8 – Harris	4 – Hawkins	State Farm Center (13,813); Champaign, IL
December 22, 2022*; 8:00 p.m., SECN	No. 16	vs. Missouri; Braggin' Rights	L 71–93	8–4	22 – Shannon Jr.	7 – Shannon Jr.	5 – Shannon Jr.	Enterprise Center (18,452); St. Louis, MO
December 29, 2022*; 7:30 p.m., FS1		Bethune–Cookman	W 85–52	9–4	22 – Dainja	11 – Hawkins	4 – Hawkins	State Farm Center (15,544); Champaign, IL
January 4, 2023; 8:00 p.m., BTN		at Northwestern; Rivalry	L 60–73	9–5 (0–3)	17 – Mayer	9 – Dainja	7 – Shannon Jr.	Welsh–Ryan Arena (7,039); Evanston, IL
January 7, 2023; 12:30 p.m., ESPN2		No. 14 Wisconsin	W 79–69	10–5 (1–3)	24 – Shannon Jr.	8 – Shannon Jr.	3 – Tied	State Farm Center (15,544); Champaign, IL
January 10, 2023; 8:00 p.m., BTN		at Nebraska	W 76–50	11–5 (2–3)	25 – Shannon Jr.	11 – Shannon Jr.	5 – Hawkins	Pinnacle Bank Arena (12,756); Lincoln, NE
January 13, 2023; 8:00 p.m., FS1		Michigan State	W 75–66	12–5 (3–3)	20 – Dainja	8 – Hawkins	5 – Epps	State Farm Center (15,544); Champaign, IL
January 16, 2023; 5:00 p.m., BTN		at Minnesota	W 78–60	13–5 (4–3)	19 – Mayer	10 – Mayer	4 – Tied	Williams Arena (9,874); Minneapolis, MN
January 19, 2023; 7:30 p.m., FS1		Indiana; Rivalry	L 65–80	13–6 (4–4)	26 – Shannon Jr.	8 – Dainja	3 – Shannon Jr.	State Farm Center (15,544); Champaign, IL
January 24, 2023; 6:00 p.m., ESPN		Ohio State	W 69–60	14–6 (5–4)	17 – Shannon Jr.	9 – Hawkins	6 – Hawkins	State Farm Center (15,544); Champaign, IL
January 28, 2023; 2:00 p.m., FOX		at Wisconsin	W 61–51	15–6 (6–4)	26 – Mayer	9 – Hawkins	2 – Tied	Kohl Center (17,071); Madison, WI
January 31, 2023; 6:00 p.m., BTN		Nebraska	W 72–56	16–6 (7–4)	16 – Mayer	8 – Hawkins	5 – Shannon Jr.	State Farm Center (15,544); Champaign, IL
February 4, 2023; 1:30 p.m., FOX		at Iowa; Rivalry	L 79–81	16–7 (7–5)	21 – Mayer	9 – Tied	5 – Epps	Carver–Hawkeye Arena (15,056); Iowa City, IA
February 11, 2023; 1:00 p.m., FS1		No. 24 Rutgers	W 69–60	17–7 (8–5)	18 – Hawkins	8 – Tied	4 – Hawkins	State Farm Center (15,554); Champaign, IL
February 14, 2023; 6:00 p.m., ESPNU		at Penn State	L 81–93	17–8 (8–6)	20 – Shannon Jr.	8 – Rodgers	4 – Shannon Jr.	Bryce Jordan Center (7,297); University Park, PA
February 18, 2023; 11:00 a.m., ESPN		at No. 14 Indiana; Rivalry	L 68–71	17–9 (8–7)	24 – Mayer	8 – Mayer	2 – Tied	Simon Skjodt Assembly Hall (17,222); Bloomington, IN
February 20, 2023; 8:00 p.m., BTN		Minnesota; Rescheduled from February 7	W 78–69	18–9 (9–7)	22 – Mayer	11 – Melendez	3 – Hawkins	State Farm Center (15,544); Champaign, IL
February 23, 2023; 8:00 p.m., BTN		No. 21 Northwestern; Rivalry	W 66–62	19–9 (10–7)	26 – Shannon Jr.	8 – Tied	2 – Mayer	State Farm Center (15,544); Champaign, IL
February 26, 2023; 11:00 a.m., CBS		at Ohio State	L 60–72	19–10 (10–8)	14 – Hawkins	7 – Hawkins	2 – Tied	Value City Arena (14,212); Columbus, OH
March 2, 2023; 6:00 p.m., ESPN		Michigan	W 91–87 ^{2OT}	20–10 (11–8)	24 – Mayer	7 – Tied	4 – Shannon Jr.	State Farm Center (15,544); Champaign, IL
March 5, 2023; 11:30 a.m., FOX		at No. 5 Purdue	L 71–76	20–11 (11–9)	16 – Mayer	6 – Mayer	6 – Hawkins	Mackey Arena (14,876); West Lafayette, IN
Big Ten tournament
March 9, 2023; 5:30 p.m., BTN	(7)	vs. (10) Penn State; Second round	L 76–79	20–12	19 – Shannon Jr.	8 – Mayer	4 – Tied	United Center; Chicago, IL
NCAA Tournament
March 16, 2023*; 3:30 pm, TBS	(9 W)	vs. (8 W) Arkansas; First Round	L 63–73	20–13	20 – Shannon Jr.	6 – Tied	3 – Tied	Wells Fargo Arena (16,745); Des Moines, IA
*Non-conference game. ^{#}Rankings from AP Poll. (#) Tournament seedings in parentheses. All times are in Central Time.

== Rankings ==
Ranking movements Legend: ██ Increase in ranking ██ Decrease in ranking RV = Received votes т = Tied with team above or below
	Week																			
Poll	Pre	1	2	3	4	5	6	7	8	9	10	11	12	13	14	15	16	17	18	Final
AP	23	19	16	16	17	18	16	RV	RV	RV	RV	RV	RV	RV	RV	RV				Not released
Coaches	23	20	14	17	17	19	16т	22	24	RV	23	RV	25	RV	RV	RV				

*AP does not release post-NCAA Tournament rankings.
