= DME Academy =

Private sports training academy in Florida, United States

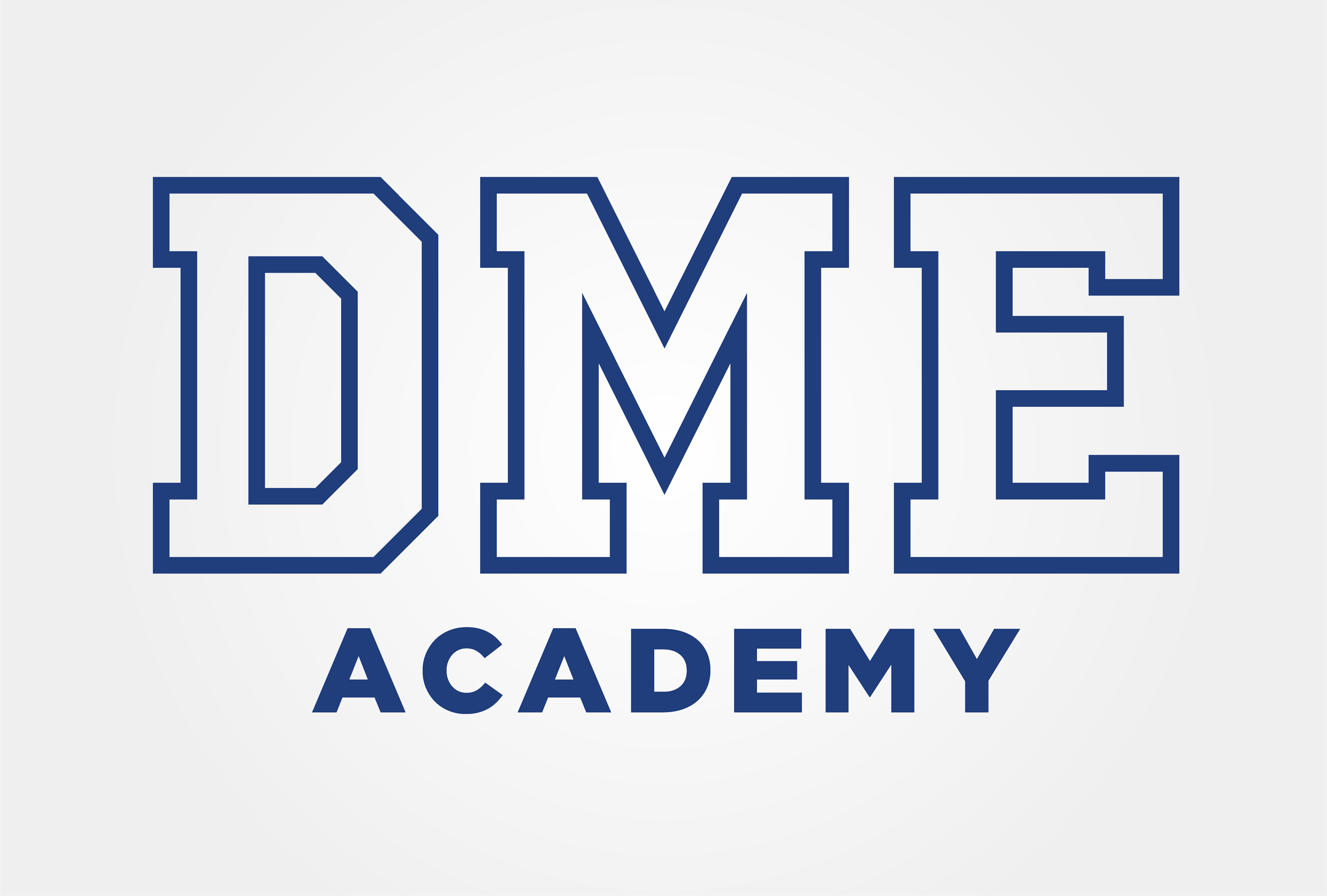
- Type: Private
- Industry: Sports
- Founded: 2015
- Headquarters: Daytona Beach, Florida
- Key people: Mike Panaggio, Co-Founder; Dan Panaggio, Co-Founder
- Parent: DME Sports
- Website: https://dmeacademy.com/

DME Academy (stands for Direct Mail Express) is a private athletic sports training academy based in Daytona Beach, Florida for post-graduate soccer and basketball players.

== History ==
DME Academy was established in 2015 as a Post Grad Basketball Training Academy. The property sits on a ten-acre campus adjacent to the Daytona Beach Airport and within eyesight of the Daytona 500.

During its first year in existence, DME Academy's National Team, the DME Lakers, reached the National Prep Championships at Albertus Magnus College in New Haven, Connecticut. The DME Lakers lost to Putnam Science in the quarter-finals.

In the 2016 National Prep Championships, DME was eliminated by Putnam Science Academy (93–66).

== Facility ==
DME Academy currently resides in the DME Sports facility, a 47,000 square foot event center. The facility consists of 2 full NBA courts, a shooting lab, a 2500 square foot video studio, a state of the art film room, 10,000 square foot strength and conditioning area and a 60 yard by 40 yard outdoor synthetic turf area for speed and agility training.

== Programs ==
=== 7-Month Post Graduate ===
The program assists high school graduates in basketball training. The season consists of a seven-month, thirty game season with potential playoff tournaments. DME Academy houses and feeds student athletes daily.

=== Intensive Summer Camp Schedule ===
DME Academy's Intensive Summer Camp is designed to test the physical and mental strength of student athletes through 2.5 - 3 hour sessions per day with 12 basketball coaches. DME Academy houses and feeds student athletes daily, utilizing beachfront accommodations.

== Notable alumni ==
- Ahmad Clark (2016), basketball player who plays professionally in Montenegro and formerly for the Albany Great Danes
- Kevon Harris (2016), basketball player for the Orlando Magic and formerly for the Stephen F. Austin Lumberjacks
- Ted Kapita (2016), former basketball player for the NC State Wolfpack
- Junior Madut (2017), basketball player who plays professionally in Finland, and formerly for the Hawaii Rainbow Warriors
- Keegan Murray (2020), basketball player for the Sacramento Kings, and formerly for the Iowa Hawkeyes
- Kris Murray (2020), basketball player for the Portland Trail Blazers, and formerly for the Iowa Hawkeyes
- Jean Montero (2021), basketball player for Valencia Basket, formerly played for Overtime Elite
- Chloe Kitts (2022), basketball player for the South Carolina Gamecocks
- Alvaro Folgueiras (2023), basketball player for the Iowa Hawkeyes
- Savo Drezgić (2024), basketball player for KK Partizan
- Moustapha Thiam (2024), basketball player for the Cincinnati Bearcats
- Yan Diomande (2024), football player for Real Madrid
- Mikel Brown Jr. (2025), basketball player
