= 2021–22 Iowa Hawkeyes men's basketball team =

American college basketball season

2021–22 Iowa Hawkeyes men's basketball

Big Ten tournament champions

NCAA tournament, First Round
- Conference: Big Ten Conference

Ranking
- Coaches: No. 21
- AP: No. 16
- Record: 26–10 (12–8 Big Ten)
- Head coach: Fran McCaffery (12th season)
- Assistant coaches: Sherman Dillard; Kirk Speraw; Billy Taylor
- Home arena: Carver–Hawkeye Arena

2021–22 Big Ten Conference men's basketball standings
	Conf.				Overall
Team	W		L	PCT	W		L	PCT
No. 19 Illinois	15	–	5	.750	23	–	10	.697
No. 14 Wisconsin	15	–	5	.750	25	–	8	.758
No. 10 Purdue	14	–	6	.700	29	–	8	.784
Rutgers	12	–	8	.600	18	–	14	.563
No. 16 Iowa †	12	–	8	.600	26	–	10	.722
Ohio State	12	–	8	.600	20	–	12	.625
Michigan State	11	–	9	.550	23	–	13	.639
Michigan	11	–	9	.550	19	–	15	.559
Indiana	9	–	11	.450	21	–	14	.600
Maryland	7	–	13	.350	15	–	17	.469
Penn State	7	–	13	.350	14	–	17	.452
Northwestern	7	–	13	.350	15	–	16	.484
Nebraska	4	–	16	.200	10	–	22	.313
Minnesota	4	–	16	.200	13	–	17	.433
† Conference tournament winner Rankings from AP poll

The 2021–22 Iowa Hawkeyes men's basketball team represented the University of Iowa during the 2021–22 NCAA Division I men's basketball season. The team was led by 12th-year head coach Fran McCaffery and played its home games at Carver–Hawkeye Arena as members of the Big Ten Conference. They finished the season 26–10, 12–8 in Big Ten play to finish in a three-way tie for fourth place. The 26 wins were the most wins in a season for Iowa since the Elite Eight team in 1986–87 earned 30 wins. As the No. 5 seed in the Big Ten tournament, they defeated Northwestern, Rutgers, Indiana, and Purdue to win the tournament championship. As a result, the Hawkeyes received the conference's automatic bid to the NCAA tournament and drew the No. 5 seed in the Midwest region. Despite winning 9 of its previous 10 games and boasting the second-best efficiency margin in Division 1 between February 1 and the start of the tournament, the Hawkeyes were upset by No. 12-seeded Richmond in the first round.

Sophomore forward Keegan Murray earned consensus First-team All-American honors, and established a new school record for points in a season. It was the third consecutive season that an Iowa player was selected a consensus First-team All-American and set a new school record for points in a season (Luka Garza, 2019–20 and 2020–21).

== Previous season ==
In a season limited due to the ongoing COVID-19 pandemic, the Hawkeyes finished the 2020–21 season 22–9, 14–6 in Big Ten play to finish in third place. They defeated Wisconsin in the quarterfinal round of the Big Ten tournament before losing to Illinois in the semifinals. The Hawkeyes received an at-large bid to the NCAA tournament as the No. 2 seed in the West region. They defeated Grand Canyon in the first round before losing to Oregon in the second round, ending their chances at their first Sweet Sixteen since 1999. Iowa spent all but two weeks of the season ranked in the top 10 of the AP poll and ended with a No. 8 ranking.

Senior center Luka Garza was named Big Ten Player of the Year and a consensus All-American for the second consecutive season. He was also named the consensus National Player of the Year and ended his career with a school-record 2,306 points (seventh in Big Ten history). After his last home game in a Hawkeye uniform, it was announced that his No. 55 jersey would be retired. Senior guard Jordan Bohannon ended the season with school-records of 639 assists and 364 three-point field goals (second in Big Ten history).

== Offseason ==
=== Returning players ===
Senior guard Jordan Bohannon announced on April 26 that he would return to Iowa taking advantage of the extra year of eligibility from the NCAA due to the COVID-19 pandemic.

=== Departures ===
Name	Number	Pos.	Height	Weight	Year	Hometown	Reason for departure
Michael Baer	0	F	6'7"	215	RS Junior	Bettendorf, IA	Graduated
CJ Fredrick	5	G	6'3"	195	RS Sophomore	Cincinnati, OH	Transferred to Kentucky
Luka Garza	55	C	6'11"	265	Senior	Washington, D.C.	Graduated, NBA draft
Jack Nunge	2	F	6'11"	245	RS Sophomore	Newburgh, IN	Transferred to Xavier
Joe Wieskamp	10	G/F	6'6"	212	Junior	Muscatine, IA	Declared for NBA draft

=== Incoming transfers ===
Name	Number	Pos.	Height	Weight	Year	Hometown	Previous School
Filip Rebrača	0	F	6'9"	230	Senior	Sombor, Serbia	Transferred from North Dakota. Will be eligible to play immediately.

=== 2021 recruiting class ===
College recruiting information
Name	Hometown	School	Height	Weight	Commit date
Riley Mulvey; C	Rotterdam, NY	St. Thomas More	6 ft 11 in (2.11 m)	230 lb (100 kg)	Apr 21, 2021
Riley Mulvey; C	Recruit ratings: Rivals: 247Sports: ESPN:				
Payton Sandfort; PF	Waukee, IA	Waukee	6 ft 8 in (2.03 m)	210 lb (95 kg)	Oct 1, 2020
Payton Sandfort; PF	Recruit ratings: Rivals: 247Sports: ESPN:				
Overall recruit ranking: 247Sports: 68
Note: In many cases, Scout, Rivals, 247Sports, On3, and ESPN may conflict in their listings of height and weight.; In these cases, the average was taken. ESPN grades are on a 100-point scale.; Sources: "2021 Iowa Basketball Commitment List". Rivals.; "ESPN – Iowa Hawkeyes Men's Basketball Recruiting". ESPN.; "2021 Team Ranking". Rivals.; "Iowa 2021 Basketball Commits". 247Sports.

== Roster ==
2021–22 Iowa Hawkeyes men's basketball team
Players
Coaches

Pos.	#	Name	Height	Weight	Year	Previous school	Hometown
F	0	Filip Rebrača	6 ft 9 in (2.06 m)	230 lb (104 kg)	Sr	North Dakota	Sombor, Serbia
G	2	Joe Toussaint	6 ft 0 in (1.83 m)	190 lb (86 kg)	Jr	Cardinal Hayes HS	Bronx, NY
G	3	Jordan Bohannon	6 ft 1 in (1.85 m)	175 lb (79 kg)	RS Sr	Linn-Mar HS	Marion, IA
G	4	Ahron Uhlis	6 ft 3 in (1.91 m)	195 lb (88 kg)	So	Marian Catholic HS	Chicago, IL
G	11	Tony Perkins	6 ft 4 in (1.93 m)	210 lb (95 kg)	So	Lawrence North HS	Indianapolis, IN
G	13	Austin Ash (W)	6 ft 3 in (1.91 m)	180 lb (82 kg)	RS Sr	Mount Vernon HS	Cedar Rapids, IA
G	14	Carter Kingsbury (W)	6 ft 4 in (1.93 m)	225 lb (102 kg)	Fr	Brewster Academy	Ponca, NE
F	15	Keegan Murray	6 ft 8 in (2.03 m)	225 lb (102 kg)	So	Prairie HS/DME Sports Academy	Cedar Rapids, IA
G	20	Payton Sandfort	6 ft 7 in (2.01 m)	215 lb (98 kg)	Fr	Waukee HS	Waukee, IA
F	22	Patrick McCaffery	6 ft 9 in (2.06 m)	200 lb (91 kg)	RS So	Iowa City West HS	Iowa City, IA
F	23	Josh Ogundele	6 ft 11 in (2.11 m)	265 lb (120 kg)	So	Worcester Academy	London, England
F	24	Kris Murray	6 ft 8 in (2.03 m)	225 lb (102 kg)	So	Prairie HS/DME Sports Academy	Cedar Rapids, IA
G	25	Luc Laketa (W)	6 ft 4 in (1.93 m)	180 lb (82 kg)	Fr	The Winchendon School	Concord, MI
G/F	30	Connor McCaffery	6 ft 5 in (1.96 m)	205 lb (93 kg)	RS Sr	Iowa City West HS	Iowa City, IA
C	44	Riley Mulvey	6 ft 11 in (2.11 m)	245 lb (111 kg)	Fr	St. Thomas More School	Rotterdam, NY

Head coach

- Fran McCaffery (Penn)

Assistant coach(es)

- Sherman Dillard (James Madison)
- Kirk Speraw (Iowa)
- Billy Taylor (Notre Dame)

Legend

- (C) Team captain
- (S) Suspended
- (I) Ineligible
- (W) Walk-on
- Injured
- Current redshirt

Roster

=== Depth chart ===
Pos.	Starting 5	Bench 1	Bench 2
C	Filip Rebrača	Josh Ogundele	Riley Mulvey
PF	Keegan Murray	Kris Murray
SF	Patrick McCaffrey	Payton Sandfort
SG	Tony Perkins	Joe Toussaint	Austin Ash
PG	Jordan Bohannon	Connor McCaffrey	Ahron Uhlis

== Schedule and results ==
Date time, TV	Rank^{#}	Opponent^{#}	Result	Record	High points	High rebounds	High assists	Site (attendance) city, state
Exhibition
November 5, 2021*; 7:00 p.m., BTN+		Slippery Rock	W 99–47	0–0	18 – P. McCaffery	8 – P. McCaffery	5 – Toussaint	Carver–Hawkeye Arena (10,789); Iowa City, IA
Regular season
November 9, 2021*; 9:00 p.m., BTN+		Longwood	W 106–73	1–0	24 – Ke. Murray	7 – Tied	5 – Ulis	Carver–Hawkeye Arena (9,259); Iowa City, IA
November 12, 2021*; 7:00 p.m., BTN+		Kansas City	W 89–57	2–0	25 – Ke. Murray	13 – Rebrača	6 – Toussaint	Carver–Hawkeye Arena (11,133); Iowa City, IA
November 16, 2021*; 8:00 p.m., BTN		North Carolina Central	W 86–69	3–0	27 – Ke. Murray	21 – Ke. Murray	4 – Ulis	Carver–Hawkeye Arena (9,132); Iowa City, IA
November 18, 2021*; 6:00 p.m., BTN		Alabama State	W 108–82	4–0	26 – Ke. Murray	8 – Tied	11 – Toussaint	Carver–Hawkeye Arena (9,957); Iowa City, IA
November 22, 2021*; 8:30 p.m., BTN		Western Michigan	W 109–61	5–0	29 – Ke. Murray	8 – Kr. Murray	8 – Ulis	Carver–Hawkeye Arena (10,044); Iowa City, IA
November 26, 2021*; 6:00 p.m., BTN+		Portland State	W 85–51	6–0	24 – Ke. Murray	9 – Ke. Murray	7 – C. McCaffery	Carver–Hawkeye Arena (11,756); Iowa City, IA
November 29, 2021*; 6:00 p.m., ESPN2		at Virginia; Big Ten–ACC Challenge	W 75–74	7–0	20 – Bohannon	9 – Ke. Murray	3 – Tied	John Paul Jones Arena (13,542); Charlottesville, VA
December 3, 2021; 8:00 p.m., BTN		at No. 2 Purdue	L 70–77	7–1 (0–1)	15 – P. McCaffery	5 – Tied	4 – Toussaint	Mackey Arena (14,804); West Lafayette, IN
December 6, 2021; 6:00 p.m., FS1		Illinois; Rivalry	L 83–87	7–2 (0–2)	19 – Ke. Murray	8 – Rebrača	7 – Ulis	Carver–Hawkeye Arena (12,072); Iowa City, IA
December 9, 2021*; 8:00 p.m., ESPN2		at No. 17 Iowa State; Iowa Corn Cy-Hawk Series	L 53–73	7–3	17 – Bohannon	7 – Ke. Murray	4 – Ulis	Hilton Coliseum (14,267); Ames, IA
December 18, 2021; 8:00 p.m., BTN		vs. Utah State; Sanford Pentagon Showcase	W 94–75	8–3	35 – Ke. Murray	7 – Ke. Murray	4 – Tied	Sanford Pentagon (3,250); Sioux Falls, SD
December 21, 2021*; 7:00 p.m., BTN+		Southeastern Louisiana	W 93–62	9–3	20 – Ke. Murray	10 – Ke. Murray	5 – Toussaint	Carver–Hawkeye Arena (10,891); Iowa City, IA
December 29, 2021*; 7:00 p.m., BTN+		Western Illinois	W 92–71	10–3	29 – Ke. Murray	10 – Ke. Murray	5 – Ulis	Carver–Hawkeye Arena (15,056); Iowa City, IA
January 3, 2022; 8:00 p.m., BTN		Maryland	W 80–75	11–3 (1–2)	35 – Ke. Murray	8 – Tied	9 – Toussaint	Carver–Hawkeye Arena (10,327); Iowa City, IA
January 6, 2022; 8:00 p.m., FS1		at No. 23 Wisconsin	L 78–87	11–4 (1–3)	27 – Ke. Murray	7 – P. McCaffery	4 – Toussaint	Kohl Center (15,212); Madison, WI
January 13, 2022; 8:00 p.m., FS1		Indiana	W 83–74	12–4 (2–3)	29 – Kr. Murray	11 – Kr. Murray	2 – Tied	Carver–Hawkeye Arena (11,246); Iowa City, IA
January 16, 2022; 1:00 p.m,, BTN		at Minnesota	W 81–71	13–4 (3–3)	25 – Ke. Murray	12 – Rebrača	7 – Toussaint	Williams Arena (10,925); Minneapolis, MN
January 19, 2022; 7:30 p.m., BTN		at Rutgers	L 46–48	13–5 (3–4)	13 – Ke. Murray	13 – Ke. Murray	5 – Toussaint	Jersey Mike's Arena (8,000); Piscataway, NJ
January 22, 2022; 3:30 p.m., BTN		Penn State	W 68–51	14–5 (4–4)	15 – Ke. Murray	8 – Ke. Murray	4 – Tied	Carver–Hawkeye Arena (15,056); Iowa City, IA
January 27, 2022; 8:00 p.m., FS1		No. 6 Purdue	L 73–83	14–6 (4–5)	23 – Kr. Murray	9 – Ke. Murray	3 – Toussaint	Carver–Hawkeye Arena (12,723); Iowa City, IA
January 31, 2022; 6:00 p.m., BTN		at Penn State	L 86–90 ^{2OT}	14–7 (4–6)	21 – Ke. Murray	7 – P. McCaffery	5 – Tied	Bryce Jordan Center (7,977); University Park, PA
February 6, 2022; 3:30 p.m., BTN		Minnesota	W 71–59	15–7 (5–6)	24 – Ke. Murray	15 – Ke. Murray	3 – Ke. Murray	Carver–Hawkeye Arena (14,558); Iowa City, IA
February 10, 2022; 6:00 p.m., ESPN2		at Maryland	W 110–87	16–7 (6–6)	30 – Tied	7 – Ke. Murray	5 – Bohannon	Xfinity Center (12,649); College Park, MD
February 13, 2022; 1:00 p.m., FS1		Nebraska	W 98–75	17–7 (7–6)	37 – Ke. Murray	8 – Sandfort	4 – McCaffrey	Carver–Hawkeye Arena (13,772); Iowa City, IA
February 17, 2022; 6:00 p.m., ESPN		Michigan	L 79–84	17–8 (7–7)	23 – Ke. Murray	7 – Ke. Murray	5 – Perkins	Carver–Hawkeye Arena (13,048); Iowa City, IA
February 19, 2022; 2:30 p.m., FOX		at No. 18 Ohio State; Rescheduled from February 3	W 75–62	18–8 (8–7)	24 – Ke. Murray	8 – Kr. Murray	2 – Tied	Value City Arena (15,876); Columbus, OH
February 22, 2022; 6:00 p.m., ESPN	No. 25	Michigan State	W 86–60	19–8 (9–7)	28 – Ke. Murray	7 – Rebrača	4 – Toussaint	Carver–Hawkeye Arena (14,634); Iowa City, IA
February 25, 2022; 8:00 p.m., FS1	No. 25	at Nebraska	W 88–78	20–8 (10–7)	20 – Perkins	11 – Ke. Murray	4 – Bohannon	Pinnacle Bank Arena (15,960); Lincoln, NE
February 28, 2022; 8:00 p.m., BTN	No. 24	Northwestern	W 82–61	21–8 (11–7)	26 – Ke. Murray	18 – Ke. Murray	4 – Bohannon	Carver–Hawkeye Arena (13,231); Iowa City, IA
March 3, 2022; 8:00 p.m., FS1	No. 24	at Michigan	W 82–71	22–8 (12–7)	23 – Ke. Murray	7 – Ke. Murray	3 – Ke. Murray	Crisler Center (12,707); Ann Arbor, MI
March 6, 2022; 6:30 p.m., FS1	No. 24	at No. 20 Illinois; Rivalry	L 72–74	22–9 (12–8)	22 – Ke. Murray	12 – Perkins	5 – Perkins	State Farm Center (15,544); Champaign, IL
Big Ten tournament
March 10, 2022; 1:15 p.m., BTN	(5) No. 24	vs. (12) Northwestern; Second round	W 112–76	23–9	26 – Ke. Murray	9 – Rebrača	6 – Perkins	Gainbridge Fieldhouse (14,856); Indianapolis, IN
March 11, 2022; 1:20 p.m., BTN	(5) No. 24	vs. (4) Rutgers; Quarterfinals	W 84–74	24–9	26 – Ke. Murray	8 – Ke. Murray	5 – C. McCaffery	Gainbridge Fieldhouse (15,848); Indianapolis, IN
March 12, 2022; 12:00 p.m., CBS	(5) No. 24	vs. (9) Indiana; Semifinals	W 80–77	25–9	32 – Ke. Murray	9 – Ke. Murray	5 – Perkins	Gainbridge Fieldhouse (17,762); Indianapolis, IN
March 13, 2022; 2:30 p.m., CBS	(5) No. 24	vs. (3) No. 9 Purdue; Championship	W 75–66	26–9	19 – Ke. Murray	11 – Ke. Murray	4 – Perkins	Gainbridge Fieldhouse (17,732); Indianapolis, IN
NCAA tournament
March 17, 2022; 2:10 p.m., truTV	(5 MW) No. 16	vs. (12 MW) Richmond; First Round	L 63–67	26–10	21 – Ke. Murray	9 – Tied	3 – Tied	KeyBank Center (16,017); Buffalo, NY
*Non-conference game. ^{#}Rankings from AP Poll. (#) Tournament seedings in parentheses. MW=Midwest. All times are in Central Time.

== Rankings ==
Ranking movements Legend: ██ Increase in ranking ██ Decrease in ranking — = Not ranked RV = Received votes т = Tied with team above or below
	Week																			
Poll	Pre	1	2	3	4	5	6	7	8	9	10	11	12	13	14	15	16	17	18	Final
AP	—	RV	RV	RV	RV	—	RV	RV	RV	RV	RV	RV	RV	RV	RV	25	24	24	16	Not released
Coaches	RV	RV^	RV	RV	RV	—	—	—	—	—	RV	RV	RV	—	RV	RV	25т	23	19	21

^Coaches did not release a Week 1 poll.
