= Keegan Murray =

American basketball player (born 2000)

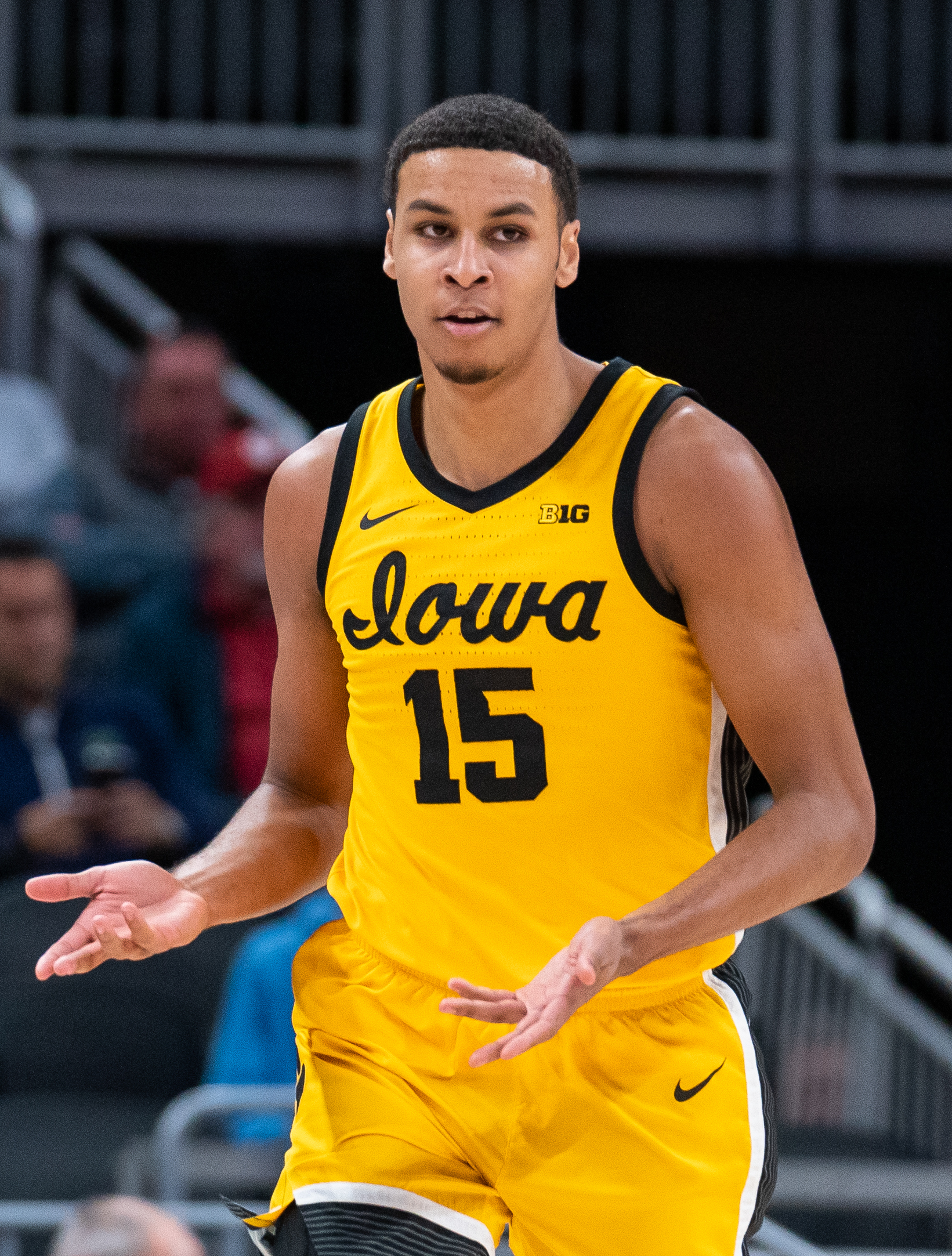
- Murray with Iowa in 2022

No. 13 – Sacramento Kings
- Position: Power forward / small forward
- League: NBA

Personal information
- Born: August 19, 2000 (age 26) Cedar Rapids, Iowa, U.S.
- Listed height: 6 ft 8 in (2.03 m)
- Listed weight: 225 lb (102 kg)

Career information
- High school: Prairie (Cedar Rapids, Iowa); DME Academy (Daytona Beach, Florida)
- College: Iowa (2020–2022)
- NBA draft: 2022: 1st round, 4th overall pick
- Drafted by: Sacramento Kings
- Playing career: 2022–present

Career history
- 2022–present: Sacramento Kings

Career highlights
- NBA All-Rookie First Team (2023); Consensus first-team All-American (2022); Karl Malone Award (2022); First-team All-Big Ten (2022); Big Ten All-Freshman Team (2021); Big Ten tournament MOP (2022)
- Stats at NBA.com
- Stats at Basketball Reference

Keegan Mitchell Murray (born August 19, 2000) is an American professional basketball player for the Sacramento Kings of the National Basketball Association (NBA). He played college basketball for the Iowa Hawkeyes before he was selected fourth overall by the Sacramento Kings in the 2022 NBA draft. He is the twin brother of Kris Murray.

== High school career ==
Murray played basketball for Prairie High School in Cedar Rapids, Iowa. As a senior, he averaged 20.3 points and 7.2 rebounds per game and was named Metro Player of the Year. Murray spent a postgraduate year at DME Academy in Daytona Beach, Florida to gain more exposure. He averaged 22.1 points and 7.5 rebounds per game, earning most outstanding player honors at the National Prep School Invitational.

== College career ==
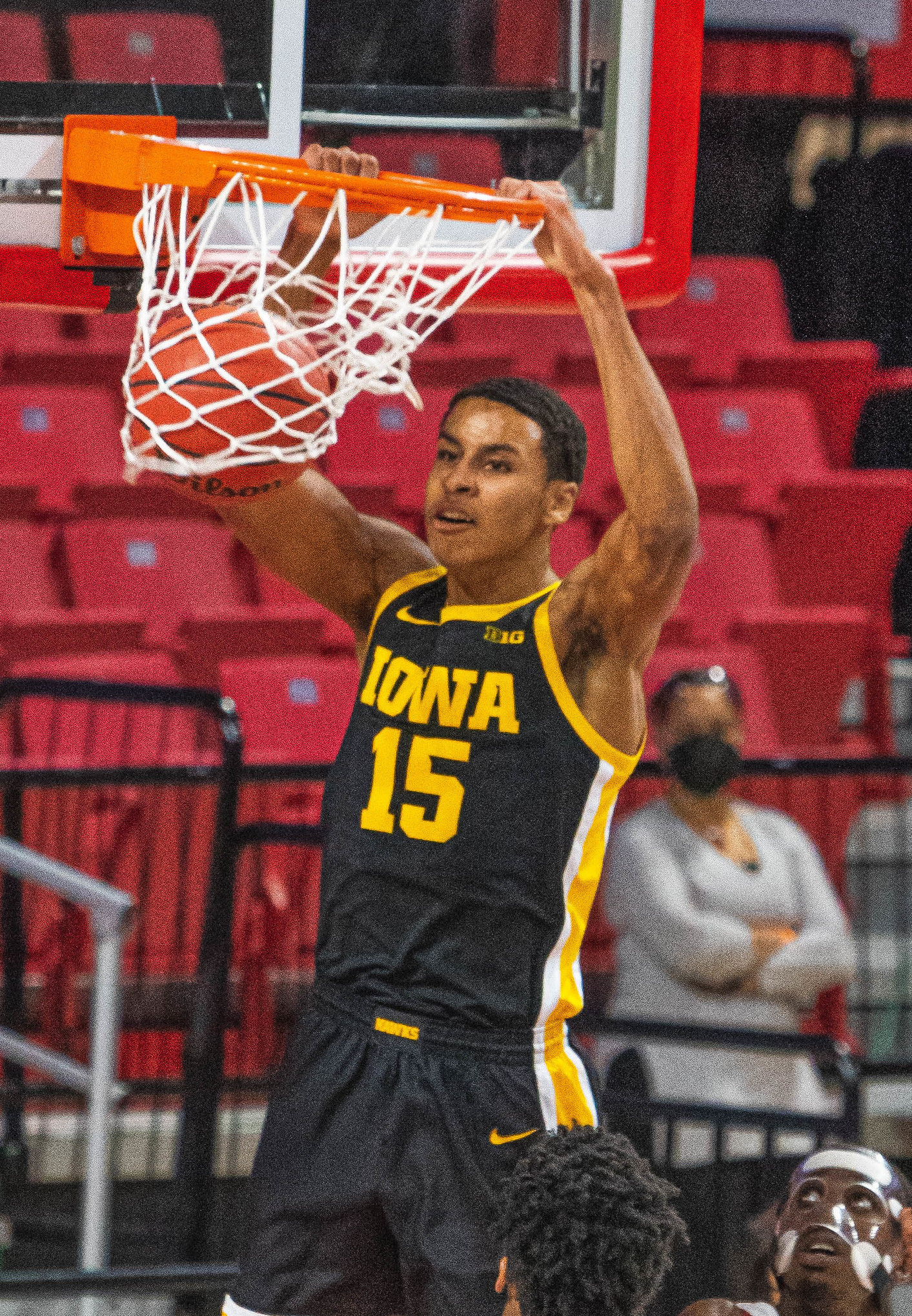
Murray dunking in January 2021

As a three-star recruit, Murray committed to Iowa. On January 2, 2021, Murray recorded a freshman season-high 14 points, nine rebounds, three steals and three blocks in a 77–75 win over Rutgers. As a freshman, he averaged 7.2 points, 5.1 rebounds and 1.3 blocks per game, earning Big Ten All-Freshman Team honors. On November 16, 2021, Murray posted 27 points, 21 rebounds and four blocks in an 86–69 win against North Carolina Central. It was the first 20-point, 20-rebound game by an Iowa player since Bruce King in 1977. On November 29, he suffered an ankle injury during a 75–74 win over Virginia, forcing him to miss a game. On December 18, Murray scored 35 points in a 94–75 victory over Utah State. He scored a career-high 37 points on February 13, 2022, in a 98–75 win against Nebraska. As a sophomore, Murray was named first-team All-Big Ten, and won the Karl Malone Award as the nation's top power forward. Additionally, he helped lead the Hawkeyes to a 2022 Big Ten men's basketball tournament championship, being named Big Ten tournament Most Outstanding Player. On March 29, 2022, Murray declared for the 2022 NBA draft, forgoing his remaining college eligibility.

== Professional career ==
=== Sacramento Kings (2022–present) ===
In the 2022 NBA draft, Murray was selected with the fourth overall pick by the Sacramento Kings. He made his summer league debut on July 2 against the Golden State Warriors, putting up 26 points and eight rebounds in an 86–68 win. Murray was named NBA Summer League MVP averaging 23 points, seven rebounds, two assists, one steal, while shooting 50% from the field and 40% from three-point range. He was also named to the All-NBA Summer League First Team. On October 22, Murray made his regular season debut, putting up 19 points, five rebounds, and two blocks in a 111–109 loss to the Los Angeles Clippers.

On January 20, 2023, Murray put up a then career-high 29 points and a career-high 14 rebounds in a 118–113 win over the Oklahoma City Thunder. On March 29, Murray made his 188th career three-pointer against the Portland Trail Blazers, surpassing Donovan Mitchell's previous record (187) for the then record for most three-pointers made in a season by a rookie in NBA history. He finished his rookie season with 206 three-pointers. Murray was named to the 2023 NBA All-Rookie First Team.

On December 16, 2023, Murray put up a career-high 47 points on 12-of-15 shooting from three-point range, including a league-record 11 made three-pointers in a row, in a 125–104 win over the Utah Jazz. He also became the youngest player in NBA history to make at least 12 three-pointers in a game at 23 years and 119 days old, surpassing the previous record set by Kobe Bryant at 24 years and 137 days old.

On October 12, 2025, it was announced that Murray would miss at least 4-to-6 weeks due to a torn ulnar collateral ligament which required surgery. On October 16, Murray signed a five-year, $140 million contract extension with the Kings. He made 23 total appearances (including 22 starts) for Sacramento during the 2025–26 season, recording averages of 14.0 points, 5.7 rebounds, and 1.7 assists. On May 13, 2026, Murray underwent arthroscopic surgery to remove loose bodies from his left ankle.

== Career statistics ==
Legend
GP	Games played	GS	Games started	MPG	Minutes per game
FG%	Field goal percentage	3P%	3-point field goal percentage	FT%	Free throw percentage
RPG	Rebounds per game	APG	Assists per game	SPG	Steals per game
BPG	Blocks per game	PPG	Points per game	**Bold**	Career high

=== NBA ===
==== Regular season ====
Year	Team	GP	GS	MPG	FG%	3P%	FT%	RPG	APG	SPG	BPG	PPG
2022–23	Sacramento	**80**	**78**	29.8	.453	**.411**	.765	4.6	1.2	.8	.5	12.2
2023–24	Sacramento	77	77	33.6	**.454**	.358	.831	5.5	**1.7**	**1.0**	.8	**15.2**
2024–25	Sacramento	76	76	34.3	.444	.343	**.833**	**6.7**	1.4	.8	.9	12.4
2025–26	Sacramento	23	22	**34.5**	.420	.277	.776	5.7	**1.7**	**1.0**	**1.6**	14.0
Career		256	253	32.7	.447	.365	.807	5.6	1.5	.9	.8	13.3

==== Playoffs ====
Year	Team	GP	GS	MPG	FG%	3P%	FT%	RPG	APG	SPG	BPG	PPG
2023	Sacramento	7	7	27.7	.448	.375	.667	6.3	.7	.6	.3	9.7
Career		7	7	27.7	.448	.375	.667	6.3	.7	.6	.3	9.7

=== College ===
Year	Team	GP	GS	MPG	FG%	3P%	FT%	RPG	APG	SPG	BPG	PPG
2020–21	Iowa	31	4	18.0	.506	.296	**.755**	5.1	.5	.8	1.3	7.2
2021–22	Iowa	**35**	**35**	**31.9**	**.554**	**.398**	.747	**8.7**	**1.5**	**1.3**	**1.9**	**23.5**
Career		66	39	25.4	.543	.373	.749	7.0	1.0	1.1	1.6	15.8

== Personal life ==
Murray's father, Kenyon, played college basketball for Iowa. Murray and his twin brother, Kris, were teammates throughout high school and college. Kris was selected as a late first-round pick in the 2023 draft by the Portland Trail Blazers and now plays for the Memphis Grizzlies.

== See also ==
- List of NBA single-game 3-point field goal leaders
