= Kris Murray =

American basketball player (born 2000)

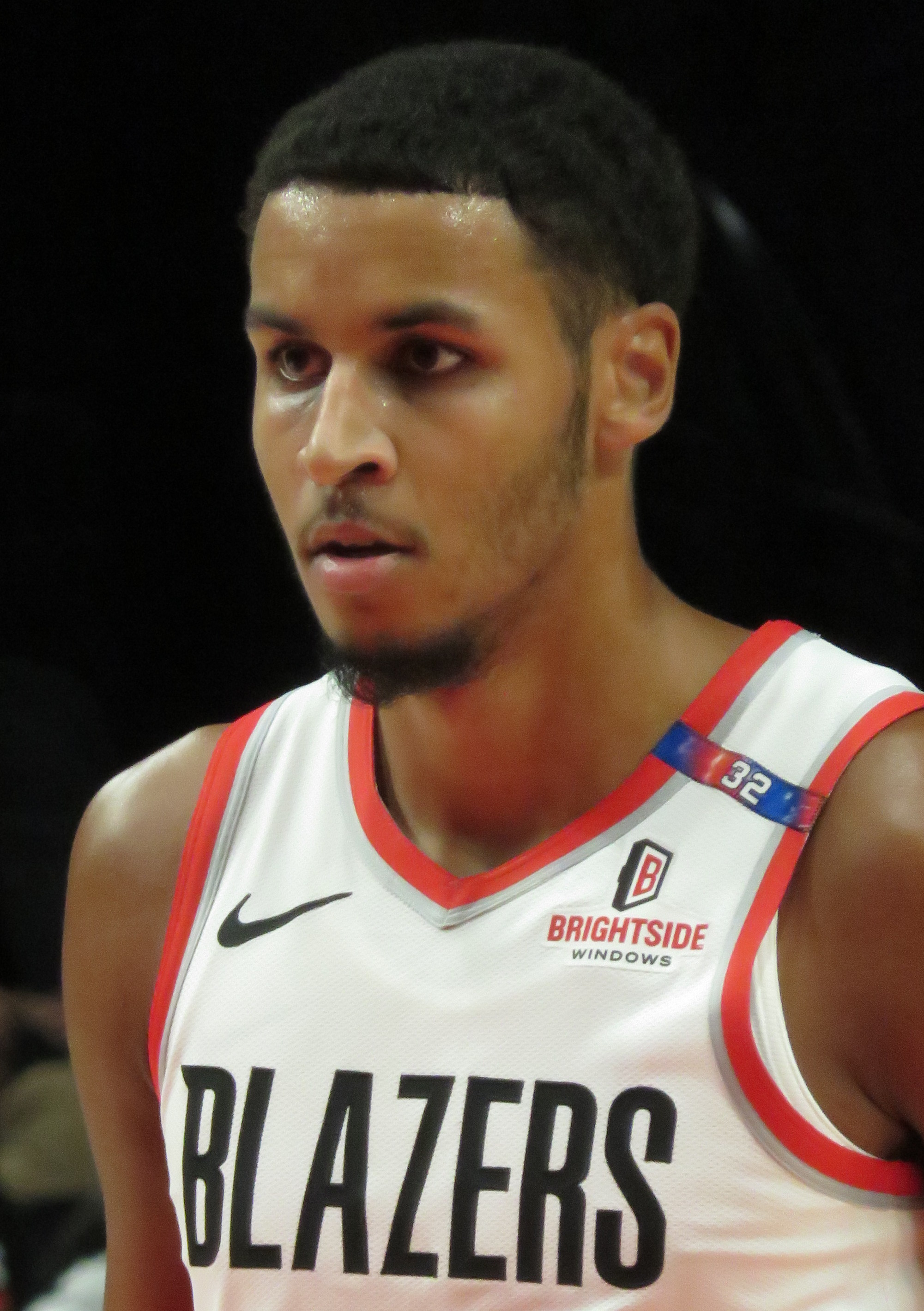
- Murray with the Blazers in 2024

No. 17 – Memphis Grizzlies
- Position: Small forward
- League: NBA

Personal information
- Born: August 19, 2000 (age 26) Cedar Rapids, Iowa, U.S.
- Listed height: 6 ft 8 in (2.03 m)
- Listed weight: 218 lb (99 kg)

Career information
- High school: Prairie (Cedar Rapids, Iowa); DME Academy (Daytona Beach, Florida)
- College: Iowa (2020–2023)
- NBA draft: 2023: 1st round, 23rd overall pick
- Drafted by: Portland Trail Blazers
- Playing career: 2023–present

Career history
- 2023–2026: Portland Trail Blazers
- 2023: →Rip City Remix
- 2026–present: Memphis Grizzlies

Career highlights
- Third-team All-American – AP, USBWA, SN (2023); First-team All-Big Ten (2023)
- Stats at NBA.com
- Stats at Basketball Reference

Kristopher James Murray (born August 19, 2000) is an American professional basketball player for the Memphis Grizzlies of the National Basketball Association (NBA). He played college basketball for the Iowa Hawkeyes of the Big Ten Conference from 2020 to 2023. He was first-team All-Big Ten in his final year with the Hawkeyes. He is the twin brother of basketball player Keegan Murray, who plays for the Sacramento Kings.

== Early life and high school career ==
Murray grew up in Cedar Rapids, Iowa and attended Prairie High School, where he played basketball with his twin brother Keegan as a teammate. He was named first team All-Metro and second team All-State after averaging 19.5 points, 6.4 rebounds, 2.1 assists, 2.5 blocks and 1.1 steals per game. Following graduation, Murray and his brother enrolled at DME Academy in Daytona Beach, Florida for a postgraduate year. Both brothers committed to playing college basketball for Iowa.

== College career ==
Murray played in 13 games, all off the bench, and 41 total minutes as a freshman for the Iowa Hawkeyes. As a sophomore, he averaged 9.7 points and 4.3 rebounds over 35 games with one start. Following the end of the season, Murray entered the 2022 NBA draft after his brother had already done so. He ultimately withdrew his name from the draft shortly after declining an invitation to the NBA draft combine.

Murray entered his junior season at Iowa on the watchlists for the Karl Malone Award and the John R. Wooden Award. He averaged 20.2 points, 7.9 rebounds and 2 assists per game and was named first-team All-Big Ten at the end of the season. Murray was also named a third-team All-American by the Associated Press, United States Basketball Writers Association and the Sporting News. After the season, he entered the 2023 NBA draft, where he was selected 23rd overall by the Portland Trail Blazers.

== Professional career ==
=== Portland Trail Blazers (2023–2026) ===
Murray was selected by the Portland Trail Blazers in the first round of the 2023 NBA draft with the 23rd overall pick and on July 1, 2023, he signed with the Blazers. He scored back-to-back career-highs in points in consecutive games against the Los Angeles Clippers on March 20, 2024 and March 22, posting 17 and then 21 points. Murray made 62 appearances (including 29 starts) for Portland during his rookie campaign, averaging 6.1 points, 3.6 rebounds, and 1.3 assists.

Murray played in 69 games (including six starts) for the Trail Blazers during the 2024–25 NBA season, recording averages of 4.2 points, 2.6 rebounds, and 1.0 assists. He made 57 appearances for Portland in the 2025–26 season, averaging 5.8 points, 3.6 rebounds, and 1.4 assists.

=== Memphis Grizzlies (2026–present) ===
On June 29, 2026, Murray was traded to the Memphis Grizzlies along with Jerami Grant in exchange for former All-Star Ja Morant.

== Career statistics ==
Legend
GP	Games played	GS	Games started	MPG	Minutes per game
FG%	Field goal percentage	3P%	3-point field goal percentage	FT%	Free throw percentage
RPG	Rebounds per game	APG	Assists per game	SPG	Steals per game
BPG	Blocks per game	PPG	Points per game	**Bold**	Career high

=== NBA ===
==== Regular season ====
Year	Team	GP	GS	MPG	FG%	3P%	FT%	RPG	APG	SPG	BPG	PPG
2023–24	Portland	62	**29**	21.7	.396	.268	.661	**3.6**	1.3	**.9**	.3	**6.1**
2024–25	Portland	**69**	6	15.1	.419	.225	.456	2.6	1.0	.5	.2	4.2
2025–26	Portland	57	15	**23.4**	**.467**	**.279**	**.684**	**3.6**	**1.4**	**.9**	**.4**	5.8
Career		188	50	19.8	.425	.259	.600	3.3	1.2	.7	.3	5.3

==== Playoffs ====
Year	Team	GP	GS	MPG	FG%	3P%	FT%	RPG	APG	SPG	BPG	PPG
2026	Portland	5	0	5.0	.500	.000	.500	.6	.0	.0	.0	1.0
Career		5	0	5.0	.500	.000	.500	.6	.0	.0	.0	1.0

=== College ===
Year	Team	GP	GS	MPG	FG%	3P%	FT%	RPG	APG	SPG	BPG	PPG
2020–21	Iowa	13	0	3.2	.231	.000	**1.000**	.6	.1	.1	.1	.6
2021–22	Iowa	**35**	1	17.9	**.479**	**.387**	.645	4.3	1.1	.8	.9	9.7
2022–23	Iowa	29	**29**	**34.9**	.476	.335	.729	**8.9**	**2.0**	**1.0**	**1.2**	**20.2**
Career		77	30	31.8	.473	.348	.699	8.0	2.2	1	1	12.1

== Personal life ==
Murray's father, Kenyon, was a four-year starter for the Iowa Hawkeyes from 1992 to 1996, and was high school Mr. Basketball in Michigan in 1992. Kris's twin brother Keegan was a top 5 pick in 2022 draft and currently plays for the Sacramento Kings.
