= Filip Rebrača =

Serbian basketball player (born 1997)

No. 0 – FMP
- Position: Power forward / Center
- League: Serbian League; ABA League

Personal information
- Born: September 3, 1997 (age 29) Treviso, Italy
- Listed height: 6 ft 9 in (2.06 m)
- Listed weight: 222 lb (101 kg)

Career information
- College: North Dakota (2018–2021); Iowa (2021–2023)
- NBA draft: 2023: undrafted
- Playing career: 2023–present

Career history
- 2023–2024: Borac Čačak
- 2024–2025: Vojvodina
- 2025–present: FMP

Career highlights
- All-KLS Honorable Mention (2025); Second team All–Summit League (2021); Third team All-Big Ten (2023)

Filip Rebrača (Serbian Cyrillic: Филип Ребрача; born September 3, 1997) is a Serbian professional basketball player for FMP of the Serbian League (KLS) and the ABA League. He played college basketball for the North Dakota Fighting Hawks and Iowa Hawkeyes.

== Early life ==
Rebrača was born in Treviso, Italy, but grew up in Sombor, Serbia. For his senior year of high school he attended Williston Northampton School in Easthampton, Massachusetts.

== College career ==
=== North Dakota ===
Rebrača spent three seasons at the University of North Dakota in Grand Forks, North Dakota. As a freshman in 2018–19, he appeared in 29 games, starting 16. As a sophomore in 2019–20, Rebrača started and played in 32 games, averaging 14.3 points, 8.9 rebounds, and 1.6 assists per game and was named to the Summit League honorable mention team. The Fighting Hawks made it to their first ever Summit League tournament championship game, but lost to North Dakota State. As a junior, Rebrača started and played in 26 games, averaging 16.8 points, 7.6 rebounds, and 1.2 assists per game. He was named to the 2021 All-Summit League Second Team.

On March 25, 2021, Rebrača announced that he was entering the transfer portal.

=== Iowa ===
On April 22, 2021, Rebrača announced that he would be committing to the University of Iowa in Iowa City, Iowa. He spent two seasons at Iowa, starting in every single game during both of those seasons. In 2021–22, he averaged 5.8 points, 5.6 rebounds, and 0.7 rebounds per game. In 2022–23, he averaged 14.1 points, 7.5 rebounds, and 2.0 assists per game. Following the season he was named to the All-Big Ten Third Team.

== Professional career ==
=== Borac Čačak (2023–2024) ===
On August 4, 2023, it was announced that Rebrača was signing his first professional contract with KK Borac Čačak who competes in the Basketball League of Serbia. During the 2023–24 season he averaged 4.9 points, 3.0 rebounds, and 0.4 assists per game.

=== Vojvodina (2024–2025) ===
On August 8, 2024, it was announced that Rebrača would be signing with KK Vojvodina, who also competes in the Basketball League of Serbia.

== Career statistics ==
Legend
GP	Games played	GS	Games started	MPG	Minutes per game
FG%	Field goal percentage	3P%	3-point field goal percentage	FT%	Free throw percentage
RPG	Rebounds per game	APG	Assists per game	SPG	Steals per game
BPG	Blocks per game	PPG	Points per game	**Bold**	Career high

=== College ===
Year	Team	GP	GS	MPG	FG%	3P%	FT%	RPG	APG	SPG	BPG	PPG
2018–19	North Dakota	29	16	21.6	.533	.357	.596	5.9	0.6	0.5	0.9	8.0
2019–20	North Dakota	32	32	32.5	.579	.111	.667	8.9	1.6	0.6	1.0	14.3
2020–21	North Dakota	26	26	31.8	.506	.366	.607	7.6	1.2	0.6	0.7	16.8
2021–22	Iowa	36	36	21.3	.534	.167	.603	5.6	0.7	0.4	0.7	5.8
2022–23	Iowa	33	33	31.6	.571	.333	.671	7.5	2.0	0.5	0.9	14.1

== Personal life ==
He is the son of former NBA player and current KK Vojvodina president Željko Rebrača.
