= 2020–21 Iowa Hawkeyes men's basketball team =

American college basketball season

2020–21 Iowa Hawkeyes men's basketball

NCAA tournament, Second Round
- Conference: Big Ten Conference

Ranking
- Coaches: No. 13
- AP: No. 8
- Record: 22–9 (14–6 Big Ten)
- Head coach: Fran McCaffery (11th season)
- Assistant coaches: Sherman Dillard; Kirk Speraw; Billy Taylor
- Home arena: Carver–Hawkeye Arena

2020–21 Big Ten Conference men's basketball standings
	Conf.				Overall
Team	W		L	PCT	W		L	PCT
No. 4 Michigan	14	–	3	.824	23	–	5	.821
No. 2 Illinois †	16	–	4	.800	24	–	7	.774
No. 8 Iowa	14	–	6	.700	22	–	9	.710
No. 20 Purdue	13	–	6	.684	18	–	10	.643
No. 7 Ohio State	12	–	8	.600	21	–	10	.677
Wisconsin	10	–	10	.500	18	–	13	.581
Rutgers	10	–	10	.500	16	–	12	.571
Maryland	9	–	11	.450	17	–	14	.548
Michigan State	9	–	11	.450	15	–	13	.536
Indiana	7	–	12	.368	12	–	15	.444
Penn State	7	–	12	.368	11	–	14	.440
Northwestern	6	–	13	.316	9	–	15	.375
Minnesota	6	–	14	.300	14	–	15	.483
Nebraska	3	–	16	.158	7	–	20	.259
† Conference tournament winner Rankings from AP poll

The 2020–21 Iowa Hawkeyes men's basketball team represented the University of Iowa during the 2020–21 NCAA Division I men's basketball season. The team was led by 11th-year head coach Fran McCaffery and played their home games at Carver–Hawkeye Arena as members of the Big Ten Conference. The Hawkeyes finished the season 22–9, 14–6 in Big Ten play to finish in third place. They defeated Wisconsin in the quarterfinal round of the Big Ten tournament before losing to Illinois in the semifinals. The Hawkeyes received an at-large bid to the NCAA tournament as the No. 2 seed in the West region. They defeated Grand Canyon in the First Round before losing to Oregon in the Second Round, ending their chances at their first Sweet Sixteen since 1999.

Senior center Luka Garza was named Big Ten Player of the Year and a consensus All-American for the second consecutive season. He was also named the consensus National Player of the Year and ended his career with a school-record 2,306 points (7th in Big Ten history). Senior guard Jordan Bohannon ended the season with school-records of 639 assists and 364 3-point field goals (2nd in Big Ten history).

== Previous season ==
The Hawkeyes finished the 2019–20 season 20–11, 11–9 in Big Ten play to finish in four-way tie for fifth place. Their season ended when postseason tournaments including the Big Ten tournament and the NCAA tournament were canceled due to the coronavirus pandemic.

Forward Luka Garza was named Big Ten Player of the Year and was a consensus All-American.

== Offseason ==
=== Returning players ===
Junior forward Luka Garza announced on April 10 that he would declare for the NBA draft, but retain his eligibility. On August 2, Garza withdrew his name from the draft and announced he would return to Iowa for his senior season.

=== Departures ===
Name	Number	Pos.	Height	Weight	Year	Hometown	Reason for departure
Bakari Evelyn	4	G	6'2"	180	Graduate Student	Detroit, MI	Completed college eligibility (Note: Evelyn was a graduate transfer in the 2019–20 season, having graduated from Valparaiso in 2019.)
Ryan Kriener	15	F	6'9"	255	Senior	Spirit Lake, IA	Graduated
Riley Till	20	F	6'7"	205	RS Junior	Dubuque, IA	Graduate transferred to Cal Poly
Cordell Pemsl	35	F	6'8"	230	RS Junior	Dubuque, IA	Graduate transferred to Virginia Tech

=== 2020 recruiting class ===
College recruiting information
Name	Hometown	School	Height	Weight	Commit date
Keegan Murray; SF	Cedar Rapids, IA	DME Academy	6 ft 8 in (2.03 m)	210 lb (95 kg)	Oct 21, 2019
Keegan Murray; SF	Recruit ratings: Rivals:				
Kris Murray; SF	Cedar Rapids, IA	DME Academy	6 ft 8 in (2.03 m)	200 lb (91 kg)	Oct 21, 2019
Kris Murray; SF	Recruit ratings: Rivals:				
Josh Ogundele; C	Worcester, MA	Worcester Academy	6 ft 9 in (2.06 m)	N/A	Nov 13, 2019
Josh Ogundele; C	Recruit ratings: Scout: Rivals: 247Sports:				
Tony Perkins; SG	Indianapolis, IN	Lawrence North	6 ft 4 in (1.93 m)	190 lb (86 kg)	Oct 20, 2019
Tony Perkins; SG	Recruit ratings: Scout: Rivals: 247Sports:				
Ahron Ulis; PG	Chicago Heights, IL	Marian Catholic	6 ft 2 in (1.88 m)	175 lb (79 kg)	Aug 6, 2019
Ahron Ulis; PG	Recruit ratings: Scout: Rivals: 247Sports:				
Overall recruit ranking: 247Sports: 63
Note: In many cases, Scout, Rivals, 247Sports, On3, and ESPN may conflict in their listings of height and weight.; In these cases, the average was taken. ESPN grades are on a 100-point scale.; Sources: "2020 Iowa Basketball Commitment List". Rivals.; "ESPN - Iowa Hawkeyes Men's Basketball Recruiting". ESPN.; "2020 Team Ranking". Rivals.; "Iowa 2020 Basketball Commits". 247Sports.

== Roster ==
2020–21 Iowa Hawkeyes men's basketball team
Players
Coaches

Pos.	#	Name	Height	Weight	Year	Previous school	Hometown
F	0	Michael Baer (W)	6 ft 7 in (2.01 m)	215 lb (98 kg)	RS Jr	Bettendorf HS	Bettendorf, IA
G	1	Joe Toussaint	6 ft 0 in (1.83 m)	190 lb (86 kg)	So	Cardinal Hayes HS	Bronx, NY
F	2	Jack Nunge (injured)	6 ft 11 in (2.11 m)	245 lb (111 kg)	RS So	Castle HS	Newburgh, IN
G	3	Jordan Bohannon	6 ft 1 in (1.85 m)	175 lb (79 kg)	RS Sr	Linn-Mar HS	Marion, IA
G	4	Ahron Uhlis	6 ft 3 in (1.91 m)	190 lb (86 kg)	Fr	Marian Catholic HS	Chicago, IL
G	5	CJ Fredrick	6 ft 3 in (1.91 m)	195 lb (88 kg)	RS So	Covington Catholic HS	Cincinnati, OH
G/F	10	Joe Wieskamp	6 ft 6 in (1.98 m)	212 lb (96 kg)	Jr	Muscatine HS	Muscatine, IA
G	11	Tony Perkins	6 ft 4 in (1.93 m)	210 lb (95 kg)	Fr	Lawrence North HS	Indianapolis, IN
G	13	Austin Ash (W)	6 ft 3 in (1.91 m)	179 lb (81 kg)	RS Jr	Mount Vernon HS	Cedar Rapids, IA
F	15	Keegan Murray	6 ft 8 in (2.03 m)	215 lb (98 kg)	Fr	Prairie HS/DME Sports Academy	Cedar Rapids, IA
F	20	Kris Murray	6 ft 8 in (2.03 m)	215 lb (98 kg)	Fr	Prairie HS/DME Sports Academy	Cedar Rapids, IA
F	22	Patrick McCaffery	6 ft 9 in (2.06 m)	200 lb (91 kg)	RS Fr	Iowa City West HS	Iowa City, IA
C	23	Josh Ogundele	6 ft 10 in (2.08 m)	285 lb (129 kg)	Fr	Worcester Academy	London, EN
G/F	30	Connor McCaffery	6 ft 5 in (1.96 m)	205 lb (93 kg)	RS Jr	Iowa City West HS	Iowa City, IA
C	55	Luka Garza	6 ft 11 in (2.11 m)	265 lb (120 kg)	Sr	Maret School	Washington, D.C.

Head coach

- Fran McCaffery (Penn)

Assistant coach(es)

- Sherman Dillard (James Madison)
- Kirk Speraw (Iowa)
- Billy Taylor (Notre Dame)

Legend

- (C) Team captain
- (S) Suspended
- (I) Ineligible
- (W) Walk-on
- Injured
- Current redshirt

Roster

== Schedule and results ==
On September 16, 2020, the NCAA announced that the start of the season would be pushed back to November 25 due to the ongoing COVID-19 pandemic.

Date time, TV	Rank^{#}	Opponent^{#}	Result	Record	High points	High rebounds	High assists	Site (attendance) city, state
Regular season
November 25, 2020*; 3:00 p.m., BTN	No. 5	NC Central	W 97–67	1–0	26 – Garza	10 – Garza	4 – C. McCaffery	Carver–Hawkeye Arena (535); Iowa City, IA
November 27, 2020*; 4:00 p.m., BTN	No. 5	Southern	W 103–76	2–0	41 – Garza	9 – Garza	7 – Bohannon	Carver–Hawkeye Arena (535); Iowa City, IA
December 3, 2020*; 7:00 p.m., BTN	No. 3	Western Illinois	W 99–58	3–0	35 – Garza	10 – Garza	6 – C. McCaffery	Carver–Hawkeye Arena (543); Iowa City, IA
December 8, 2020*; 6:30 p.m., ESPN	No. 3	No. 16 North Carolina; ACC–Big Ten Challenge	W 93–80	4–0	24 – Bohannon	14 – Garza	6 – Bohannon	Carver–Hawkeye Arena (583); Iowa City, IA
December 11, 2020*; 8:00 p.m., BTN	No. 3	Iowa State; Iowa Corn Cy-Hawk Series	W 105–77	5–0	34 – Garza	10 – Nunge	7 – Toussaint	Carver–Hawkeye Arena (560); Iowa City, IA
December 13, 2020*; 1:00 p.m., FS1	No. 3	Northern Illinois	W 106–53	6–0	23 – Garza	8 – Tied	7 – C. McCaffery	Carver–Hawkeye Arena (546); Iowa City, IA
December 19, 2020; 11:00 a.m., CBS	No. 3	vs. No. 1 Gonzaga	L 88–99	6–1	30 – Garza	10 – Garza	4 – Wieskamp	Sanford Pentagon (243); Sioux Falls, SD
December 22, 2020; 8:00 p.m., BTN	No. 4	Purdue	W 70–55	7–1 (1–0)	22 – Garza	9 – Tied	6 – C. McCaffery	Carver–Hawkeye Arena (536); Iowa City, IA
December 25, 2020; 7:00 p.m., BTN	No. 4	at Minnesota	L 95–102 ^{OT}	7–2 (1–1)	32 – Garza	17 – Garza	6 – C. McCaffery	Williams Arena (0); Minneapolis, MN
December 29, 2020; 8:00 p.m., FS1	No. 10	No. 19 Northwestern	W 87–72	8–2 (2–1)	24 – Bohannon	6 – Garza	5 – Bohannon	Carver–Hawkeye Arena (464); Iowa City, IA
January 2, 2021; 1:00 p.m., ESPN2	No. 10	at No. 14 Rutgers	W 77–75	9–2 (3–1)	25 – Garza	9 – Murray	4 – Tied	Louis Brown Athletic Center (0); Piscataway, NJ
January 7, 2021; 6:00 p.m., ESPN2	No. 5	at Maryland	W 89–67	10–2 (4–1)	24 – Garza	7 – Garza	10 – C. McCaffery	Xfinity Center (0); College Park, MD
January 10, 2021; 1:30 pm, BTN	No. 5	No. 16 Minnesota	W 86–71	11–2 (5–1)	33 – Garza	10 – Nunge	14 – Bohannon	Carver–Hawkeye Arena (569); Iowa City, IA
January 17, 2021; 11:00 a.m., CBS	No. 5	at Northwestern	W 96–73	12–2 (6–1)	17 – Garza	10 – Garza	4 – Tied	Welsh-Ryan Arena (0); Evanston, IL
January 21, 2021; 8:00 p.m., FS1	No. 4	Indiana	L 69–81	12–3 (6–2)	28 – Garza	12 – Tied	4 – C. McCaffrey	Carver–Hawkeye Arena (566); Iowa City, IA
January 29, 2021; 8:00 p.m., FS1	No. 7	at No. 19 Illinois; Rivalry	L 75–80	12–4 (6–3)	19 – Tied	8 – Murray	5 – Tied	State Farm Center (190); Champaign, IL
February 2, 2021; 6:00 p.m., FS1	No. 8	Michigan State	W 84–78	13–4 (7–3)	27 – Garza	12 – Garza	6 – Toussaint	Carver–Hawkeye Arena (557); Iowa City, IA
February 4, 2021; 6:00 p.m., ESPN	No. 8	No. 7 Ohio State	L 85–89	13–5 (7–4)	18 – Tied	10 – Wieskamp	6 – Bohannon	Carver–Hawkeye Arena (503); Iowa City, IA
February 7, 2021; 11:00 a.m., FOX	No. 8	at Indiana	L 65–67	13–6 (7–5)	18 – Tied	8 – Wieskamp	2 – Bohannon	Simon Skjodt Assembly Hall (0); Bloomington, IN
February 10, 2021; 6:30 p.m., BTN	No. 15	No. 25 Rutgers	W 79–66	14–6 (8–5)	26 – Wieskamp	10 – Tied	7 – Bohannon	Carver–Hawkeye Arena (560); Iowa City, IA
February 13, 2021; 1:30 p.m., FOX	No. 15	at Michigan State	W 88–58	15–6 (9–5)	21 – Wieskamp	11 – Nunge	6 – Nunge	Breslin Center (0); East Lansing, MI
February 18, 2021; 6:00 p.m., ESPN	No. 11	at No. 21 Wisconsin	W 77–62	16–6 (10–5)	30 – Garza	12 – Murray	5 – Bohannon	Kohl Center (0); Madison, WI
February 21, 2021; 4:00 p.m., FS1	No. 11	Penn State	W 74–68	17–6 (11–5)	23 – Garza	11 – Tied	6 – Bohannon	Carver–Hawkeye Arena (566); Iowa City, IA
February 25, 2021; 6:00 p.m., ESPN	No. 9	at No. 3 Michigan	L 57–79	17–7 (11–6)	16 – Garza	8 – C. McCaffrey	2 – Fredrick	Crisler Center (83); Ann Arbor, MI
February 28, 2021; 3:00 p.m., CBS	No. 9	at No. 4 Ohio State	W 73–57	18–7 (12–6)	24 – Garza	11 – Garza	7 – Toussaint	Value City Arena (0); Columbus, OH
March 4, 2021; 8:00 p.m., BTN	No. 5	Nebraska	W 102–64	19–7 (13–6)	26 – Bohannon	8 – Garza	8 – C. McCaffery	Carver–Hawkeye Arena (549); Iowa City, IA
March 7, 2021; 11:30 a.m., FOX	No. 5	No. 25 Wisconsin	W 77–73	20–7 (14–6)	21 – Garza	16 – Garza	8 – Bohannon	Carver–Hawkeye Arena (582); Iowa City, IA
Big Ten tournament
March 12, 2021; 8:00 p.m., BTN	(3) No. 5	vs. (6) Wisconsin; Quarterfinals	W 62–57	21–7	24 – Garza	9 – Garza	6 – McCaffery	Lucas Oil Stadium (7,735); Indianapolis, IN
March 13, 2021; 2:30 p.m., CBS	(3) No. 5	vs. (2) No. 3 Illinois; Semifinals/Rivalry	L 71–82	21–8	21 – Garza	12 – Garza	6 – Bohannon	Lucas Oil Stadium (8,000); Indianapolis, IN
NCAA tournament
March 20, 2021; 5:25 p.m., TBS	(2 W) No. 8	vs. (15 W) Grand Canyon; First Round	W 86–74	22–8	24 – Garza	9 – Wieskamp	5 – Wieskamp	Indiana Farmers Coliseum (986); Indianapolis, IN
March 22, 2021; 11:10 a.m., CBS	(2 W) No. 8	vs. (7 W) Oregon; Second Round	L 80–95	22–9	36 – Garza	9 – Garza	5 – Wieskamp	Bankers Life Fieldhouse (3,565); Indianapolis, IN
*Non-conference game. ^{#}Rankings from AP Poll. (#) Tournament seedings in parentheses. W=West. All times are in Central Time.

- Source: Schedule

== Rankings ==
Ranking movements Legend: ██ Increase in ranking ██ Decrease in ranking ( ) = First-place votes
	Week																	
Poll	Pre	1	2	3	4	5	6	7	8	9	10	11	12	13	14	15	16	Final
AP	5	3	3	3 (1)	4	10	5	5	4	7	8	15	11	9	5	5	8	Not released
Coaches	6 (1)	6^ (1)	3 (1)	3 (2)	5	11	7	8	4	7	8	16	14	12	8	6	8	13

^Coaches did not release a Week 1 poll.
