= 2009 MAAC men's basketball tournament =

- 2009 MAAC Tournament Logo
- Classification: Division I
- Season: 2008–09
- Teams: 10
- Site: Times Union Center; Albany, New York
- Champions: Siena (4th title)
- Winning coach: Fran McCaffery (2nd title)
- MVP: Kenny Hasbrouck (Siena)
- Television: ESPN2, MSG, MSG Plus

2008–09 MAAC men's basketball standings
	Conf.				Overall
Team	W		L	PCT	W		L	PCT
Siena †	16	–	2	.889	27	–	8	.771
Niagara	14	–	4	.778	26	–	9	.743
Rider	12	–	6	.667	19	–	13	.594
Manhattan	9	–	9	.500	16	–	14	.533
Fairfield	9	–	9	.500	17	–	15	.531
Saint Peter's	8	–	10	.444	11	–	19	.367
Iona	7	–	11	.389	12	–	19	.387
Loyola (MD)	7	–	11	.389	12	–	20	.375
Canisius	4	–	14	.222	11	–	20	.355
Marist	4	–	14	.222	10	–	23	.303
† 2009 MAAC tournament winner Rankings from AP Poll

The 2009 MAAC men's basketball tournament was an NCAA college basketball tournament held at the Times Union Center in Albany, New York on March 6–9, 2009, to decide the Metro Atlantic Athletic Conference champion. The winner, Siena advanced to the 2009 NCAA Men's Division I Basketball Tournament, a 65-team event to decide the national champion of Division I college basketball. Siena received a No. 9 seed and upset No. 8 seed Ohio State 74–72 in double overtime, then were defeated by No. 1 seed Louisville 79–72 in the second round.

== Seeds ==
All 10 teams in the conference participated in the Tournament. The top six teams received byes to the quarterfinals. Teams were seeded by record within the conference, with a tiebreaker system to seed teams with identical conference records.

Seed	School	Conference	Tiebreaker	Tiebreaker 2
1	Siena	16–2		
2	Niagara	14–4		
3	Rider	12–6		
4	Manhattan	9–9	1–1 vs Fairfield	1–1 vs Rider
5	Fairfield	9–9	1–1 vs Manhattan	0–2 vs Rider
6	Saint Peter's	8–10		
7	Iona	7–11	1–1 vs Loyola	1–1 vs Niagara
8	Loyola (MD)	7–11	1–1 vs Iona	0–2 vs Niagara
9	Canisius	4–14	2–0 vs Marist	
10	Marist	4–14	0–2 vs Canisius	

== Schedule ==
Session	Game	Time*	Matchup^{#}	Score	Television
First round – Friday, March 6
1	1	7:30 pm	No. 8 Loyola vs No. 9 Canisius	68–74	MAAC-TV
1	2	9:30 pm	No. 7 Iona vs No. 10 Marist	40–43	MAAC-TV
Quarterfinals – Saturday, March 7
2	3	2:30 pm	No. 4 Manhattan vs No. 5 Fairfield	61–68	MSG2
2	4	5:00 pm	No. 1 Siena vs No. 9 Canisius	77–52	MSG
Quarterfinals – Saturday, March 7
3	5	7:30 pm	No. 2 Niagara vs No. 10 Marist	79–50	MSG+
3	6	10:00 pm	No. 3 Rider vs No. 6 Saint Peter's	67–58	MSG2
Semifinals – Sunday, March 8
4	7	6:00 pm	No. 1 Siena vs No. 5 Fairfield	80–65	MSG2
4	8	8:30 pm	No. 2 Niagara vs No. 3 Rider	93–89 ^{2OT}	MSG+
Championship – Monday, March 9
5	9	9:00 pm	No. 1 Siena vs No. 2 Niagara	77–70	ESPN2
*Game times in ET. #-Rankings denote tournament seeding.

== Bracket ==
First round Friday, March 6
8	Loyola (MD)	68
9	Canisius	74
7	Iona	40
10	Marist	43

Quarterfinals; Saturday, March 7
1	Siena	77
9	Canisius	52
5	Fairfield	68
4	Manhattan	61
2	Niagara	79
10	Marist	50
6	Saint Peter's	58
3	Rider	67

Semifinals; Sunday, March 8
1	Siena	80
5	Fairfield	65
2	Niagara	93
3	Rider	89 ^{2OT}

Final; Monday, March 9
1	Siena	77
2	Niagara	70
