= 2007–08 Siena Saints men's basketball team =

American college basketball season

2007–08 Siena Saints men's basketball

MAAC tournament champions MAAC Regular Season Champions

NCAA tournament, second round
- Conference: Metro Atlantic Athletic Conference
- Record: 23–11 (13–5 MAAC)
- Head coach: Fran McCaffery (3rd season)
- Assistant coaches: Mitch Buonaguro; Andrew Francis; Adam Chaskin
- Home arena: Times Union Center

2007–08 MAAC men's basketball standings
	Conf.				Overall
Team	W		L	PCT	W		L	PCT
Siena †	13	–	5	.722	23	–	11	.676
Rider	13	–	5	.722	23	–	11	.676
Niagara	12	–	6	.667	19	–	10	.655
Loyola (MD)	12	–	6	.667	19	–	14	.576
Fairfield	11	–	7	.611	14	–	16	.467
Marist	11	–	7	.611	18	–	14	.563
Iona	8	–	10	.444	12	–	20	.375
Manhattan	5	–	13	.278	12	–	19	.387
Saint Peter's	3	–	15	.167	6	–	24	.200
Canisius	2	–	16	.111	6	–	25	.194
† 2008 MAAC tournament winner Rankings from AP Poll

The 2007–08 Siena Saints men's basketball team represented Siena College in the 2007–08 college basketball season. This was head coach Fran McCaffery's third season at Siena. The Saints competed in the Metro Atlantic Athletic Conference and played their home games at Times Union Center. They finished the season 23–11, 13–5 in MAAC play to capture the regular season championship. They also won the 2008 MAAC men's basketball tournament to earn the conference's automatic bid to the NCAA tournament as No. 13 seed in the Midwest Region. After an opening round upset of No. 4 seed Vanderbilt, the Saints lost to No. 12 seed Villanova in the second round.

== Roster ==
2007–08 Siena Saints men's basketball team
Players	Coaches
Pos. / # / Name / Height / Weight / Year / Hometown; G / 41 / Kenny Hasbrouck / 6 ft 3 in (1.91 m) / 190 lb (86 kg) / Jr / Capital Heights, Maryland	Head coach: Fran McCaffery; Assistant coach(es): Mitch Buonaguro; Andrew Francis; Adam Chaskin; Legend: (C) Team captain; (S) Suspended; (I) Ineligible; (W) Walk-on; Injured; Current redshirt; Roster

== Schedule and results ==
- All times are Eastern

Date time, TV	Rank^{#}	Opponent^{#}	Result	Record	Site (attendance) city, state
Regular season
Nov 9, 2007*		at James Madison	L 88–100	0–1	JMU Convocation Center (3,233); Harrisonburg, Virginia
Nov 12, 2007*		at Syracuse	L 89–97	0–2	Carrier Dome (17,746); Syracuse, New York
Nov 13, 2007*		vs. Fairleigh Dickinson	W 88–66	1–2	Carrier Dome (16,946); Syracuse, New York
Nov 17, 2007*		No. 20 Stanford	W 79–67	2–2	Times Union Center (6,274); Albany, New York
Nov 25, 2007*		at Cornell	L 77–83	2–3	Newman Arena (1,471); Ithaca, New York
Dec 1, 2007*		Albany	W 75–71	3–3	Times Union Center (13,262); Albany, New York
Dec 7, 2007		at Fairfield	W 74–61	4–3 (1–0)	Arena at Harbor Yard (1,569); Fairfield, Connecticut
Dec 9, 2007		Iona	W 81–76	5–3 (2–0)	Times Union Center (5,134); Albany, New York
Dec 22, 2007*		Holy Cross	W 84–77 ^{OT}	6–3	Times Union Center (5,285); Albany, New York
Dec 28, 2007*		Saint Joseph's	L 68–74	6–4	Times Union Center (6,440); Albany, New York
Dec 31, 2007*		Dartmouth	W 89–54	7–4	Times Union Center (4,497); Albany, New York
Jan 3, 2008*		at No. 2 Memphis	L 58–102	7–5	FedExForum (16,836); Memphis, Tennessee
Jan 6, 2008		Saint Peter's	W 79–56	8–5 (3–0)	Times Union Center (4,542); Albany, New York
Jan 8, 2008		Fairfield	L 52–53	8–6 (3–1)	Times Union Center (4,308); Albany, New York
Jan 11, 2008		at Niagara	W 94–84	9–6 (4–1)	Gallagher Center (2,400); Lewiston, New York
Jan 13, 2008		at Canisius	W 72–44	10–6 (5–1)	Koessler Athletic Center (874); Buffalo, New York
Jan 17, 2008		Manhattan	W 69–56	11–6 (6–1)	Times Union Center (5,549); Albany, New York
Jan 21, 2008		Canisius	W 77–49	12–6 (7–1)	Times Union Center (5,013); Albany, New York
Jan 24, 2008		at Loyola (MD)	L 56–85	12–7 (7–2)	Reitz Arena (1,943); Baltimore, Maryland
Jan 27, 2008		at Iona	W 64–51	13–7 (8–2)	Hynes Athletic Center (2,423); New Rochelle, New York
Feb 2, 2008		Rider	L 75–89	13–8 (8–3)	Times Union Center (6,432); Albany, New York
Feb 4, 2008		Marist	W 76–72	14–8 (9–3)	Times Union Center (5,697); Albany, New York
Feb 8, 2008		at Marist	W 97–88 ^{OT}	15–8 (10–3)	McCann Recreation Center (3,200); Poughkeepsie, New York
Feb 10, 2008		at Rider	W 80–77	16–8 (11–3)	Alumni Gymnasium (1,700); Lawrenceville, New Jersey
Feb 16, 2008		Loyola (MD)	L 76–83 ^{OT}	16–9 (11–4)	Times Union Center (6,463); Albany, New York
Feb 18, 2008		at Manhattan	L 72–73	16–10 (11–5)	Draddy Gymnasium (1,725); New York, New York
Feb 23, 2008*		at Boise State	W 93–70	17–10	Taco Bell Arena (5,982); Boise, Idaho
Feb 29, 2008		Niagara	W 94–78	18–10 (12–5)	Times Union Center (7,366); Albany, New York
Mar 2, 2008		at Saint Peter's	W 77–64	19–10 (13–5)	Yanitelli Center (1,247); Jersey City, New Jersey
MAAC tournament
Mar 8, 2008*	(1)	(8) Manhattan; Quarterfinals	W 66–58	20–10	Times Union Center (7,894); Albany, New York
Mar 9, 2008*	(1)	(4) Loyola (MD); Semifinals	W 65–63	21–10	Times Union Center (6,577); Albany, New York
Mar 10, 2008*	(1)	(2) Rider; Championship	W 74–53	22–10	Times Union Center (9,279); Albany, New York
NCAA tournament
Mar 21, 2008*	(13 MW)	vs. (4 MW) No. 19 Vanderbilt; Second Round	W 83–62	23–10	St. Pete Times Forum (15,328); Tampa, Florida
Mar 23, 2008*	(13 MW)	vs. (12 MW) Villanova; Second Round	L 72–84	23–11	St. Pete Times Forum (14,504); Tampa, Florida
*Non-conference game. ^{#}Rankings from AP poll. (#) Tournament seedings in parentheses. MW=Midwest.
