= 2008–09 Siena Saints men's basketball team =

American college basketball season

2008–09 Siena Saints men's basketball

MAAC tournament champions MAAC Regular Season Champions

NCAA tournament, second round
- Conference: Metro Atlantic Athletic Conference
- Record: 27–8 (16–2 MAAC)
- Head coach: Fran McCaffery (4th season)
- Assistant coaches: Mitch Buonaguro; Andrew Francis; Adam Chaskin
- Home arena: Times Union Center

2008–09 MAAC men's basketball standings
	Conf.				Overall
Team	W		L	PCT	W		L	PCT
Siena †	16	–	2	.889	27	–	8	.771
Niagara	14	–	4	.778	26	–	9	.743
Rider	12	–	6	.667	19	–	13	.594
Manhattan	9	–	9	.500	16	–	14	.533
Fairfield	9	–	9	.500	17	–	15	.531
Saint Peter's	8	–	10	.444	11	–	19	.367
Iona	7	–	11	.389	12	–	19	.387
Loyola (MD)	7	–	11	.389	12	–	20	.375
Canisius	4	–	14	.222	11	–	20	.355
Marist	4	–	14	.222	10	–	23	.303
† 2009 MAAC tournament winner Rankings from AP Poll

The 2008–09 Siena Saints men's basketball team represented Siena College in the 2007–08 college basketball season. This was head coach Fran McCaffery's fourth season at Siena. The Saints competed in the Metro Atlantic Athletic Conference and played their home games at Times Union Center. They finished the season 27–8, 16–2 in MAAC play to capture the regular season championship. They also won the 2009 MAAC men's basketball tournament for the second consecutive season to earn the conference's automatic bid to the NCAA tournament as No. 9 seed in the Midwest Region. After an opening round win over No. 8 seed Ohio State, the Saints lost to No. 1 seed Louisville in the second round.

== Roster ==
2007–08 Siena Saints men's basketball team
Players	Coaches
Pos. / # / Name / Height / Weight / Year / Hometown; G / 41 / Kenny Hasbrouck / 6 ft 3 in (1.91 m) / 190 lb (86 kg) / Sr / Capital Heights, Maryland	Head coach: Fran McCaffery; Assistant coach(es): Mitch Buonaguro; Andrew Francis; Adam Chaskin; Legend: (C) Team captain; (S) Suspended; (I) Ineligible; (W) Walk-on; Injured; Current redshirt; Roster

== Schedule and results ==
- All times are Eastern

Date time, TV	Rank^{#}	Opponent^{#}	Result	Record	Site (attendance) city, state
Regular season
Nov 17, 2008*		Boise State	W 82–52	1–0	Times Union Center (6,626); Albany, New York
Nov 22, 2008*		Cornell	W 74–56	2–0	Times Union Center (7,575); Albany, New York
Nov 27, 2008*		vs. No. 12 Tennessee; Old Spice Classic	L 64–78	2–1	The Milk House (3,357); Lake Buena Vista, Florida
Nov 28, 2008*		vs. Wichita State; Old Spice Classic	L 70–72	2–2	The Milk House (3,926); Lake Buena Vista, Florida
Nov 30, 2008*		vs. Oklahoma State; Old Spice Classic	L 68–77	2–3	The Milk House (3,768); Lake Buena Vista, Florida
Dec 3, 2008		at Loyola (MD)	W 75–68	3–3 (1–0)	Reitz Arena (1,228); Baltimore, Maryland
Dec 6, 2008*		Albany	W 71–64	4–3	Times Union Center (13,251); Albany, New York
Dec 9, 2008		Marist	W 77–60	5–3 (2–0)	Times Union Center (5,351); Albany, New York
Dec 17, 2008*		at No. 3 Pittsburgh	L 66–79	5–4	Petersen Events Center (10,045); Pittsburgh, Pennsylvania
Dec 23, 2008*		Buffalo	W 71–60	6–4	Times Union Center (5,716); Albany, New York
Dec 28, 2008*		at Saint Joseph's	W 75–74	7–4	The Palestra (6,128); Philadelphia, Pennsylvania
Dec 30, 2008*		at Holy Cross	W 83–71	8–4	Hart Center (2,681); Worcester, Massachusetts
Jan 1, 2009		Fairfield	W 87–81	9–4 (3–0)	Times Union Center (6,469); Albany, New York
Jan 4, 2009		Saint Peter's	W 65–52	10–4 (4–0)	Times Union Center (5,583); Albany, New York
Jan 6, 2009*		at Kansas	L 84–91	10–5	Allen Fieldhouse (16,300); Lawrence, Kansas
Jan 9, 2009		Rider	W 91–81	11–5 (5–0)	Times Union Center (6,656); Albany, New York
Jan 11, 2009		at Manhattan	W 68–64	12–5 (6–0)	Draddy Gymnasium (1,351); New York, New York
Jan 15, 2009		at Marist	W 91–85 ^{OT}	13–5 (7–0)	McCann Arena (2,311); Poughkeepsie, New York
Jan 17, 2009		at Fairfield	W 78–62	14–5 (8–0)	Arena at Harbor Yard (3,217); Fairfield, Connecticut
Jan 24, 2009		Niagara	W 82–65	15–5 (9–0)	Times Union Center (7,980); Albany, New York
Jan 26, 2009		Iona	W 69–68	16–5 (10–0)	Times Union Center (6,466); Albany, New York
Jan 29, 2009		Canisius	W 91–73	17–5 (11–0)	Times Union Center (6,237); Albany, New York
Feb 2, 2009		at Saint Peter's	W 74–63	18–5 (12–0)	Yanitelli Center (837); Jersey City, New Jersey
Feb 7, 2009		at Rider	L 88–90	18–6 (12–1)	Alumni Gymnasium (1,650); Lawrenceville, New Jersey
Feb 9, 2009		Loyola (MD)	W 73–60	19–6 (13–1)	Times Union Center (5,984); Albany, New York
Feb 12, 2009		Manhattan	W 93–69	20–6 (14–1)	Times Union Center (8,065); Albany, New York
Feb 16, 2009		at Iona	W 75–60	21–6 (15–1)	Hynes Athletic Center (2,410); New Rochelle, New York
Feb 21, 2009*		Northern Iowa	W 81–75	22–6	Times Union Center (8,065); Albany, New York
Feb 27, 2009		at Niagara	L 85–100	22–7 (15–2)	Gallagher Center (2,400); Lewiston, New York
Mar 1, 2009		at Canisius	W 78–74	23–7 (16–2)	Koessler Athletic Center (1,098); Buffalo, New York
MAAC tournament
Mar 7, 2009*		Canisius; Quarterfinals	W 77–52	24–7	Times Union Center (9,674); Albany, New York
Mar 8, 2009*		Fairfield; Semifinals	W 80–65	25–7	Times Union Center (8,011); Albany, New York
Mar 9, 2009*		Niagara; Championship Game	W 77–70	26–7	Times Union Center (9,744); Albany, New York
NCAA tournament
Mar 20, 2009*	(9 MW)	vs. (8 MW) Ohio State; First Round	W 74–72 ^{2OT}	27–7	University of Dayton Arena (12,596); Dayton, Ohio
Mar 22, 2009*	(9 MW)	vs. (1 MW) No. 1 Louisville; Second Round	L 72–79	27–8	University of Dayton Arena (12,596); Dayton, Ohio
*Non-conference game. ^{#}Rankings from AP poll. (#) Tournament seedings in parentheses. MW=Midwest.

== Awards and honors ==
- Kenny Hasbrouck – MAAC Player of the Year
- Fran McCaffery – MAAC Men's Coach of the Year
