= Connor McCaffery =

American basketball coach (born 1998)

Noblesville Boom
- Title: Player development assistant
- League: NBA G League

Personal information
- Born: July 13, 1998 (age 28) South Bend, Indiana, U.S.

Career information
- High school: Iowa City West (Iowa City, Iowa)
- College: Iowa (2017–2023)
- Position: Guard
- Coaching career: 2023–present

Career history

Coaching
- 2024–2026: Butler (assistant)
- 2026–present: Noblesville Boom (player development assistant)

Connor John McCaffery (born July 13, 1998) is an American basketball coach who currently serves as a player development assistant for the Noblesville Boom of the NBA G League.

== Early life and playing career ==
McCaffery was born in South Bend, Indiana where his father, Fran McCaffery was an assistant basketball coach at Notre Dame. He spent his early childhood in Greensboro, North Carolina while Fran was the head basketball coach at UNC Greensboro until moving to Albany, New York after his father became the head coach at Siena. McCaffery moved with his family to Iowa City, Iowa at age 12 when his father was named the head coach at the University of Iowa. He attended Iowa City West High School. McCaffery averaged 19.6 points, 4.8 rebounds, 3.7 assists, and 1.8 steals per game as a senior. He committed to play both college basketball and baseball at Iowa.

McCaffery initially intended to redshirt his freshman basketball season with the Iowa Hawkeyes, but ultimately started the season playing off the bench. However, he suffered a labrum injury and used a medical redshirt. McCaffery batted .238 during his freshman baseball season before choosing to focus solely on basketball. McCaffery decided to utilize the extra year of eligibility granted to college athletes who played in the 2020 season due to the COVID-19 pandemic and return to Iowa for a sixth year. Over the course of his college career, he played in 166 games and averaged 4.5 points and 3.2 assists per game.

== Coaching career ==
McCaffery began his coaching career with an entry-level position as a team assistant for the Indiana Pacers in 2023. After one season with the Pacers he was hired as an assistant coach at Butler.

On June 2, 2026, McCaffery was hired to serve as a player development assistant for the Noblesville Boom of the NBA G League.

== Personal life ==
McCaffery's father, Fran McCaffery, played college basketball at Wake Forest and Penn before entering coaching. His mother, Margaret, played basketball at Notre Dame and was an All-American. His younger brother, Patrick, played college basketball at Iowa and Butler and his other younger brother, Jack, plays at Butler.

McCaffery is in a relationship with former Iowa and current WNBA player Caitlin Clark.
