= Patrick McCaffery =

American basketball player (born 2000)

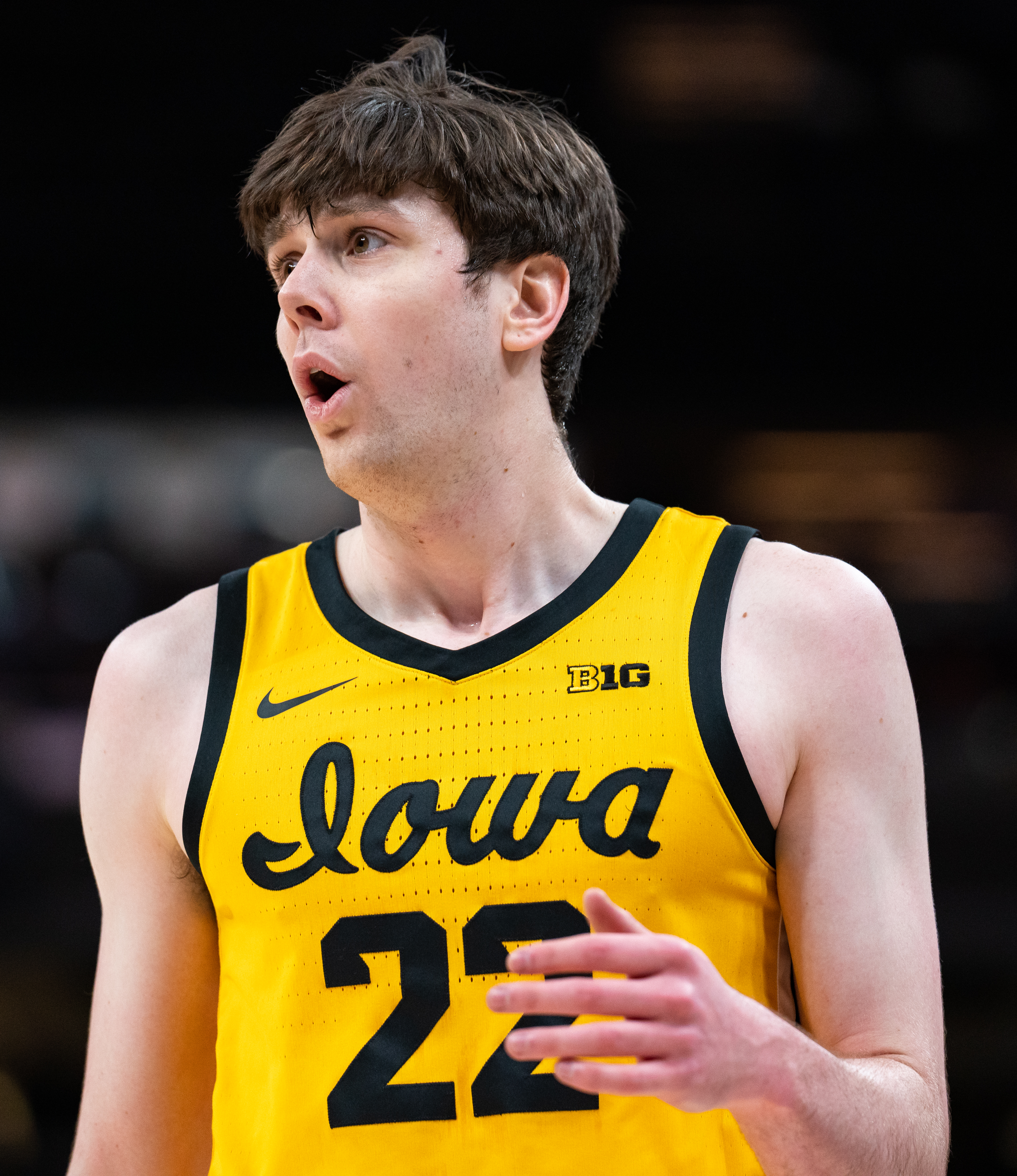
- McCaffery with Iowa in 2022

No. 22 – Wilki Morskie Szczecin
- Position: Power forward
- League: PLK

Personal information
- Born: March 20, 2000 (age 26) Greensboro, North Carolina, U.S.
- Listed height: 6 ft 9 in (2.06 m)
- Listed weight: 212 lb (96 kg)

Career information
- High school: Iowa City West (Iowa City, Iowa)
- College: Iowa (2019–2024); Butler (2024–2025)
- NBA draft: 2025: undrafted

Career history
- 2025–2026: CS Vâlcea 1924
- 2026–present: Wilki Morskie Szczecin

Patrick D. McCaffery (born March 20, 2000) is an American professional basketball player for Wilki Morskie Szczecin of the Polish Basketball League (PLK). He previously played college basketball for the Iowa Hawkeyes and the Butler Bulldogs.

== Early life and high school career ==
McCaffery was born in Greensboro, North Carolina where his father, Fran McCaffery was the head basketball coach at UNC Greensboro and spent his early childhood there until moving to Albany, New York after Fran became the head coach at Siena. He moved with his family to Iowa City, Iowa at age ten when his father was named the head coach at the University of Iowa. McCaffery was diagnosed with thyroid cancer when he was 13 years old. He was diagnosed cancer free after three months of treatment, including two surgeries.

McCaffery attended Iowa City West High School and made the varsity basketball team as a freshman. He was named first-team All-State after winning the 2017 4A State Championship and averaged 19.9 points and six rebounds per game in his junior season. McCaffery repeated as a first-team All-State selection after averaging 25.1 points and 7.6 rebounds per game. He also set Iowa City West's scoring record during his senior season. McCaffery was rated a consensus top-100 recruit and committed to playing college basketball for his father at Iowa.

== College career ==
McCaffery played in two games as a freshman before missing the rest of the season after encountering complications from his cancer treatment. He ultimately was granted a hardship waiver by the NCAA and allowed to use a redshirt on the season. He played in all 31 of the Hawkeyes games as a redshirt freshman and averaged 5.2 points and 2.7 rebounds per game. McCaffery became a starter and averaged 10.5 points and 3.6 rebounds as a redshirt sophomore.

McCaffery started the first 14 games of his redshirt junior season before taking a leave of absence from the team, citing the need to address his mental health. He returned to the team after a six-game leave of absence. McCaffery served as a key reserve coming off the bench after his return. He finished the season averaging 9.8 points and 3.5 rebounds in 27 games played. McCaffery played in 31 games with 15 starts during his redshirt senior season and averaged 8.9 points and 2.8 rebounds. After the season, McCaffery decided to utilize the extra year of eligibility granted to college athletes who played in the 2020 season due to the COVID-19 pandemic and entered the NCAA transfer portal.

McCaffery ultimately transferred to play at Butler. On November 8, 2024, McCaffery scored 23 points and grabbed eight rebounds in a 68-66 loss against Austin Peay. McCaffery had 20 points and pulled down seven rebounds in a 73–58 victory over Eastern Illinois on December 3, 2024. On January 4, 2025, McCaffery scored 13 points and had 11 rebounds for his second career double-double and first in his Butler career in a 70–62 loss at St. John's. McCaffery had 21 points and collected seven rebounds in an 80–76 loss against Creighton on January 11, 2025. In the regular season finale, McCaffery scored 19 points and had three steals in an 87–74 loss at Creighton on March 8, 2025. McCaffery had 16 points in a 78–57 loss against St. John's in the 2025 Big East Tournament on March 13, 2025.

== Professional career ==
On August 22, 2025, he signed with CS Vâlcea 1924 of the Liga Națională.

On July 30, 2026, he signed with Wilki Morskie Szczecin of the Polish Basketball League (PLK).

== Career statistics ==
Legend
GP	Games played	GS	Games started	MPG	Minutes per game
FG%	Field goal percentage	3P%	3-point field goal percentage	FT%	Free throw percentage
RPG	Rebounds per game	APG	Assists per game	SPG	Steals per game
BPG	Blocks per game	PPG	Points per game	**Bold**	Career high

=== College ===
Year	Team	GP	GS	MPG	FG%	3P%	FT%	RPG	APG	SPG	BPG	PPG
2019–20	Iowa	2	0	13.5	.300	.000	–	2.5	.5	.5	.0	3.0
2020–21	Iowa	31	0	14.6	.438	.302	.707	2.7	.9	.4	.4	5.2
2021–22	Iowa	32	32	24.2	.422	.330	.714	3.6	1.6	.6	**.5**	10.5
2022–23	Iowa	27	14	22.4	.409	.347	.771	3.5	1.0	**.8**	.4	9.8
2023-24	Iowa	31	15	23.0	**.441**	.312	.788	2.8	1.2	.4	.3	8.9
2024-25	Butler	**35**	**35**	**32.1**	.432	**.416**	**.855**	**4.3**	**1.6**	.5	.2	**11.2**
Career		157	96	23.4	.427	.357	.770	3.4	1.3	.3	.5	9.1

== Personal life ==
McCaffery's father, Fran McCaffery, played college basketball at Wake Forest and Penn before entering coaching. His mother, Margaret, played basketball at Notre Dame and was an All-American. His brother Connor also played basketball for Iowa. While undergoing treatment for cancer McCaffery became close friends with NBA star Chris Paul.
