= Marc Brown (basketball) =

American basketball player and coach

New Jersey City Gothic Knights
- Title: Head coach
- League: New Jersey Athletic Conference

Personal information
- Born: July 5, 1969 (age 57) West Orange, New Jersey, U.S.
- Listed height: 5 ft 11 in (1.80 m)
- Listed weight: 170 lb (77 kg)

Career information
- High school: Columbia (Maplewood, New Jersey)
- College: Siena (1987–1991)
- NBA draft: 1991: undrafted
- Playing career: 1991–2007
- Position: Point guard
- Coaching career: 2007–present

Career history

Playing
- 1991–1993: Albany Patroons
- 1993–1994: Ovarense
- 1994–1995: Fort Wayne Fury
- 1995–1997: Corinthians-RS
- 1997–1998: Flamengo
- 1998–2001: Uberlândia
- 2001: Marinos
- 2001–2002: BCM Gravelines
- 2003–2004: Flamengo
- 2004–2005: Reims
- 2005: Telemar
- 2006: Reims
- 2006: Xalapa
- 2006–2007: Hyères-Toulon

Coaching
- 2007–present: New Jersey City

Career highlights
- As player: MAAC Player of the Year (1991); 4× First-team All-MAAC (1988–1991); North Atlantic tournament MVP (1989); No. 4 retired by Siena Saints; As coach: NJAC Coach of the Year (2013)

Marc Brown (born July 5, 1969) is an American basketball coach and former professional player. He is currently head basketball coach at New Jersey City University. He played professionally for 15 years following an All-American college career at Siena College.

== College career ==
Brown, a 5-foot-11-inch (1.80 m) point guard, played basketball at Columbia High School in Maplewood, New Jersey, graduating in 1987, and played collegiately at Siena. As a sophomore, Brown led Siena to its first NCAA tournament appearance in 1989 then led the 14th-seeded Saints to a first round upset over 3 seed Stanford. Brown scored 32 points, handed out 6 assists, and hit the winning free throws in the 80–78 victory. He was named an honorable mention All-American by the Associated Press that year.

Brown ended up as a four-time first team All-Conference performer in the ECAC North and the Metro Atlantic Athletic Conference (MAAC), and was named the conference's player of the year as a senior in 1991. He also repeated as an AP honorable mention All-American that season. Brown ended his Siena career as the school's leading scorer (2,284 career points), assists (796), and fourth in steals (221). He was elected to the school's athletic Hall of Fame in 1998.

== Professional career ==
Brown went undrafted in the 1991 NBA draft, and embarked on a 15-year professional career taking him to Portugal, France, Brazil, Venezuela and Mexico. He also played in the Continental Basketball Association for the Albany Patroons and Fort Wayne Fury.

== Coaching career ==
After retiring from basketball in 2007, Marc Brown followed his father Charles Brown as head coach at New Jersey City University on an interim basis. In 2010, Brown was named head coach of the Knights. In the 2010–11 season Brown lead New Jersey City University to their 18th NCAA Division III tournament, guiding the team to a victory over Montclair State University in the conference championship game. The victory guided NJCU to their 12th New Jersey Athletic Conference title.

== Coaching record ==
=== NCAA DIII ===
Record table
Season	Team	Overall	Conference	Standing	Postseason
New Jersey City University (New Jersey Athletic Conference) (2007–present)
2007–08	NJCU	14–12	6–7		
2008–09	NJCU	10–15	4–7	8th	
2009–10	NJCU	13–13	5–8	8th	
2010–11	NJCU	19–10	8–5	3rd	NCAA first round
2011–12	NJCU	17–8	7–6	4th	
2012–13	NJCU	15–13	9–9	6th	
2013–14	NJCU	14–13	9–9	5th	
2014–15	NJCU	13–14	9–9	6th	
2015–16	NJCU	21–8	15–3	1st	ECAC Metro Champions
2016–17	NJCU	21–8	13–5	3rd	NCAA first round
2017–18	NJCU	19–8	13–5	3rd	NCAA first round
2018–19	NJCU	20–8	14–4	1st	
2019–20	NJCU	11–12	8–8	5th	
2020–21	NJCU	0–0	0–0	N/A	
2021-22	NJCU	12–15	8–10	7th	
2022-23	NJCU	3-2	0-1		
New Jersey City University:		215–152 (.586)	124–94 (.569)		
Total:		215–152 (.586)			
National champion Postseason invitational champion Conference regular season champion Conference regular season and conference tournament champion Division regular season champion Division regular season and conference tournament champion Conference tournament champion
