= 2008 MAAC men's basketball tournament =

- 2008 MAAC Tournament Logo
- Classification: Division I
- Season: 2007–08
- Teams: 10
- Site: Times Union Center; Albany, New York
- Champions: Siena (3rd title)
- Winning coach: Fran McCaffery (1st title)
- MVP: Kenny Hasbrouck (Siena)
- Top scorer: Jason Thompson (Rider) (72 points)
- Television: MSG, ESPN2

2007–08 MAAC men's basketball standings
	Conf.				Overall
Team	W		L	PCT	W		L	PCT
Siena †	13	–	5	.722	23	–	11	.676
Rider	13	–	5	.722	23	–	11	.676
Niagara	12	–	6	.667	19	–	10	.655
Loyola (MD)	12	–	6	.667	19	–	14	.576
Fairfield	11	–	7	.611	14	–	16	.467
Marist	11	–	7	.611	18	–	14	.563
Iona	8	–	10	.444	12	–	20	.375
Manhattan	5	–	13	.278	12	–	19	.387
Saint Peter's	3	–	15	.167	6	–	24	.200
Canisius	2	–	16	.111	6	–	25	.194
† 2008 MAAC tournament winner Rankings from AP Poll

The 2008 MAAC men's basketball tournament was an NCAA college basketball tournament held at the Times Union Center in Albany, New York on March 7–10, 2007, to decide the Metro Atlantic Athletic Conference champion. On Monday, March 10 2008, top-seeded Siena defeated #2 seed Rider 74–53 in the championship game, and received the conference's automatic bid to the 2008 NCAA Men's Division I Basketball Tournament. Siena received a #13 seed and upset #4 seed Vanderbilt 83–62, then were defeated in the second round by #12 seed Villanova 84–72.

== Seeds ==
All 10 teams in the conference participated in the Tournament. The top six teams received byes to the quarterfinals. Teams were seeded by record within the conference, with a tiebreaker system to seed teams with identical conference records.

Seed	School	Conference	Tiebreaker	Tiebreaker 2	Tiebreaker 3
1	Siena	13–5	1–1 vs Rider	2–2 vs Niag/Loy	3–1 vs FF/Mar
2	Rider	13–5	1–1 vs Siena	2–2 vs Niag/Loy	2–2 vs FF/Mar
3	Niagara	12–6	2–0 vs Loyola		
4	Loyola (MD)	12–6	0–2 vs Niagara		
5	Fairfield	11–7	1–1 vs Mar	1–1 vs Siena	
6	Marist	11–7	1–1 vs FF	0–2 vs Siena	
7	Iona	8–10			
8	Manhattan	5–13			
9	Saint Peter's	3–15			
10	Canisius	2–16			

== Schedule ==
Session	Game	Time*	Matchup^{#}	Score	Television
First round – Friday, March 7
1	1	7:30 pm	No. 8 Manhattan vs No. 9 Saint Peter's	73–59	MSG
1	2	10:00 pm	No. 7 Iona vs No. 10 Canisius	59–64	MSG
Quarterfinals – Saturday, March 8					MSG
2	3	2:15 pm	No. 4 Loyola vs No. 5 Fairfield	64–59	MSG
2	4	4:30 pm	No. 1 Siena vs No. 8 Manhattan	66–58	MSG
Quarterfinals – Saturday, March 8
3	5	7:30 pm	No. 2 Rider vs No. 10 Canisius	75–71	MSG
3	6	10:00 pm	No. 3 Niagara vs No. 6 Marist	62–66	MSG
Semifinals – Sunday, March 9
4	7	6:00 pm	No. 1 Siena vs No. 4 Loyola	65–63	MSG
4	8	8:00 pm	No. 2 Rider vs No. 6 Marist	76–71	MSG
Championship – Monday, March 10
5	9	7:00 pm	No. 1 Siena vs No. 2 Rider	74–53	ESPN2
*Game times in ET. #-Rankings denote tournament seeding.

== Bracket ==
First round Friday, March 7
8	Manhattan	73
9	Saint Peter's	59
7	Iona	59
10	Canisius	64

Quarterfinals; Saturday, March 8
1	Siena	66
8	Manhattan	58
4	Loyola (MD)	64
5	Fairfield	59
2	Rider	75
10	Canisius	71
3	Niagara	62
6	Marist	66

Semifinals; Sunday, March 9
1	Siena	65
4	Loyola (MD)	63
2	Rider	76
6	Marist	71

Final; Monday, March 10
1	Siena	74
2	Rider	53

== Game summaries ==
=== First round ===
MSG

March 7, 2008
7:30 pm

No. 8 Manhattan 73, No. 9 Saint Peter's 59
Scoring by half: 33–24, 40–35
Pts: Austin – 26; Rebs: Gabriel – 9 Asts: Smith – 5 Pearson – 15 pts	Pts: Sowell – 20; Rebs: Gooding – 6 Asts: Leon – 6 Leon – 3 stl

Times Union Center
Albany, NY
Attendance: n/a
Referees: Jim Haney, William Bush, Ray Perone

MSG

March 7, 2008
7:00 pm

No. 7 Iona 59, No. 10 Canisius 64
Scoring by half: 35–26, 24–38
Pts: Prodanovic – 14; Rebs: Springer – 8 Asts: Camper – 5 Camper – 4 stl	Pts: Johnson – 14; Rebs: Logins – 7 Asts: Turner – 6 Vazquez-Simmons – 5 blk

Times Union Center
Albany, NY
Attendance: n/a
Referees: John Cahill, Brian O'Connell, Michael Berry

=== Quarterfinals ===
MSG

March 8, 2008
2:15 pm

No. 4 Loyola 64, No. 5 Fairfield 59
Scoring by half: 34–21, 30–38
Pts: Brown – 18; Rebs: Tuck – 8 Asts: Rudolph – 6 Harvey – 16 points	Pts: Han – 14; Rebs: Johnson & O'Sullivan – 6 Asts: Han – 8 Diakhate – 3 stl

Times Union Center
Albany, NY
Attendance: n/a
Referees: Bob Adams, Kevin Ferguson, Ken Turner

MSG

March 8, 2008
4:30 pm

No. 1 Siena 66, No. 8 Manhattan 58
Scoring by half: 32–23, 34–35
Pts: Franklin – 26; Rebs: Franklin – 9 Asts: Moore – 10; Franklin – 3 stl	Pts: Austin – 17; Rebs: Austin – 11; Asts: Pearson – 3 Austin – 2 blk

Times Union Center
Albany, NY
Attendance: 7,894
Referees: John Hughes, Jeff Anderson, Joe DeMayo

MSG

March 8, 2008
7:30 pm

No. 2 Rider 75, No. 10 Canisius 71
Scoring by half: 41–29, 34–42
Pts: Thompson – 18; Rebs: Thompson – 11; Asts: Ringgold – 4 Ringgold – 2 stl	Pts: Logins – 20; Rebs: Turner – 7 Asts: Turner – 7 Vazquez-Simmons – 3 blk

Times Union Center
Albany, NY
Attendance: 3,879
Referees: Gary Tracy, John Sweeney, Doug Aprahamian

MSG

March 8, 2008
10:00 pm

No. 3 Niagara 62, No. 6 Marist 66
Scoring by half: 33–32, 29–34
Pts: Fisher – 23; Rebs: Fisher – 16; Asts: Nelson – 4 Lewis – 21 pts	Pts: Devezin – 14; Rebs: Benjamin – 11; Asts: Devezin – 3 Farmer – 7 reb

Times Union Center
Albany, NY
Attendance: n/a
Referees: n/a

=== Semifinals ===
MSG

March 10, 2019
6:00 pm

No. 1 Siena 65, No. 4 Loyola 63
Scoring by half: 28–38, 37–25
Pts: Franklin – 22; Rebs: Franklin – 12; Asts: Moore – 5 Franklin – 3 blk	Pts: Sullivan – 14; Rebs: Israel – 18; Asts: Brown & Israel – 3 Israel – 12 pts, 3 blk

Times Union Center
Albany, NY
Attendance: n/a
Referees: Ed Corbett, Earl Walton, Joe DeMayo

MSG

March 10, 2019
8:00 pm

No. 2 Rider 76, No. 6 Marist 71
Scoring by half: 32–39, 44–32
Pts: Thompson – 32; Rebs: Thompson – 18; Asts: Mansell & Griffin – 4 Johnson – 2 stl	Pts: Gavin – 21; Rebs: McCroskey – 9 Asts: Farmer & Devezin – 4 McCroskey – 16 pts

Times Union Center
Albany, NY
Attendance: 6,577
Referees: Pat Driscoll, Ray Perone, Brian O'Connell

=== Championship ===
ESPN2

March 11, 2019
7:00 pm

No. 1 Siena 74, No. 2 Rider 53
Scoring by half: 41–30, 33–23
Pts: Fisher – 21; Rebs: Fisher & Hasbrouck – 5 Asts: Hasbrouck & Moore – 4 Fisher – 3 stl	Pts: Thompson – 22; Rebs: Thompson – 12; Asts: Mansell – 3 Thompson – 2 blk

Times Union Center
Albany, NY
Attendance: 9,279
Referees: Ed Corbett, Mike Kitts, Jim Haney

== Honors ==
MAAC All-Championship Team	Player	School	Position	Year
MAAC All-Championship Team	Harris Mansell	Rider	G	Junior
MAAC All-Championship Team	Jason Thompson	Rider	C	Senior
MAAC All-Championship Team	Tay Fisher	Siena	G	Senior
MAAC All-Championship Team	Edwin Ubiles	Siena	F	Sophomore
MAAC All-Championship Team	Alex Franklin	Siena	F	Sophomore
MAAC All-Championship Team	Kenny Hasbrouck †	Siena	G	Junior

† Most Valuable Player
