= Fran McCaffery =

American basketball coach (born 1959)

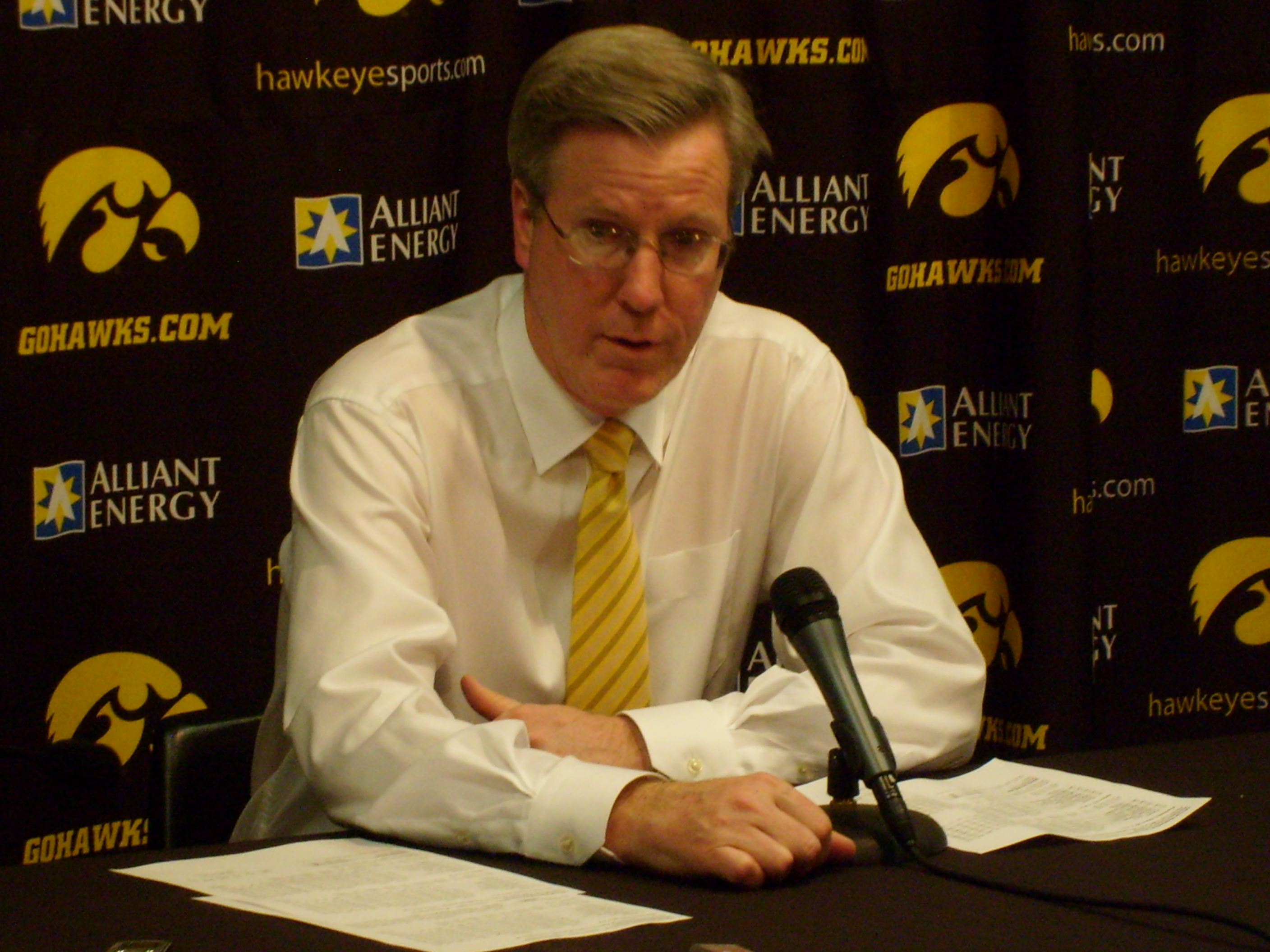
- McCaffery in 2010

Current position
- Title: Head coach
- Team: Penn
- Conference: Ivy League
- Record: 21–15 (.583)

Biographical details
- Born: May 23, 1959 (age 67); Philadelphia, Pennsylvania, U.S.

Playing career
- 1977–1978: Wake Forest
- 1979–1982: Penn
- Position: Point guard

Coaching career (HC unless noted)
- 1982–1983: Penn (assistant)
- 1983–1985: Lehigh (assistant)
- 1985–1988: Lehigh
- 1988–1999: Notre Dame (assistant)
- 1999–2005: UNC Greensboro
- 2005–2010: Siena
- 2010–2025: Iowa
- 2025–present: Penn

Head coaching record
- Overall: 568–399 (.587)
- Tournaments: 6–13 (NCAA Division I); 7–5 (NIT)

Accomplishments and honors

Championships
- ECC tournament (1988); SoCon tournament (2001); SoCon regular season (2002); 3 MAAC tournament (2008–2010); 3 MAAC regular season (2008–2010); Big Ten tournament (2022); Ivy League tournament (2026)

Awards
- MAAC Coach of the Year (2009)

Francis John McCaffery (born May 23, 1959) is an American college basketball coach who is the current men's basketball head coach at the University of Pennsylvania. He previously served as head coach of Lehigh University, UNC Greensboro, Siena, and Iowa. McCaffery has led all five programs he has coached to the NCAA tournament at least once, one of five coaches in NCAA Division I history to do so.

McCaffery played college basketball for one season at Wake Forest before transferring to Penn.

He began his college coaching career with a stint at Penn as an assistant coach. McCaffery became an assistant coach at Lehigh in 1983. He was the youngest head coach in Division I when he was promoted to head coach in 1985. Following his career at Lehigh, McCaffery spent 11 years as an assistant at Notre Dame. In 1999, he became the head coach of the UNC Greensboro Spartans. McCaffery had a 90–87 record through six seasons. He led the Spartans to the Southern Conference Championship and the NCAA Tournament in 2001.

In his five seasons at Siena, McCaffery guided the Saints to four 20-win seasons, including three consecutive MAAC regular season and conference tournament championships. These resulted in three consecutive berths to the NCAA Tournament, in which they defeated both Vanderbilt and Ohio State in the first rounds. McCaffery's tenure at Siena is considered the greatest in program history as he revived a program that had a record of 6–24 prior to his arrival. He also maintained a 100% graduation rate for players completing their NCAA eligibility.

McCaffery was introduced as the head coach of the Iowa Hawkeyes on March 29, 2010, where he reached the final of the 2013 National Invitation Tournament and reached the NCAA Division I men's basketball tournament in seven of his 15 seasons.

On March 26, 2025, McCaffery was named head coach of the Penn Quakers, his alma mater.

== Head coaching career ==
=== Lehigh Mountain Hawks ===
McCaffery began his tenure at Lehigh University as an assistant coach for two seasons before being promoted at age 26 on September 14, 1985, to succeed Tom Schneider who had resigned to return to Penn in a similar capacity six days prior on September 8. He led Lehigh to a 49–39 record in his three-year term with the Engineers (Lehigh changed their mascot to the Mountain Hawks after McCaffery left). In the 1987–1988 season, McCaffery led Lehigh to its second NCAA Tournament Appearance in program history. He left Lehigh to join Digger Phelps' staff at the University of Notre Dame on August 1, 1988.

=== UNC Greensboro Spartans ===
McCaffery posted a 90–87 record in six seasons. In his first year at the helm, Greensboro compiled a 15–13 record overall and a 9-7 Southern Conference mark, good for third place in the North Division. It was the 18th-most improved record nationally among NCAA Division I teams.

In McCaffery's second season, he guided the Spartans to unprecedented heights with a 19–12 record and the 2001 SoCon Tournament Championship. The Spartans defeated Chattanooga, 67–66, in the finals and received the SoCon's automatic bid to the NCAA Tournament. The following year (2001-2002) McCaffery led the Spartans to their first 20-win season since joining the conference. It marked the first time the program claimed a share of the SoCon North Division title as well. After falling to eventual tournament champion Davidson in the conference tournament semifinals, the Spartans were awarded a berth into the 2002 NIT, where they lost to eventual champion Memphis.

In his final year in Greensboro, McCaffery brought the Spartans to the brink of the NCAA Tournament before a SoCon Championship game loss to Chattanooga. He led UNCG to a victory over Davidson in the semifinals, defeating a team that had been 16–0 in conference play. A big part of that success was SoCon Freshman of the Year Kyle Hines. Hines set UNCG and SoCon records for blocked shots, and also broke several other UNCG single-game and freshman single-season marks.

=== Siena Saints ===
==== 2005–06 ====
In 2005, the Siena Saints were picked to finish last in preseason polls for the Metro Atlantic Athletic Conference. However, McCaffery orchestrated the fifth greatest turnaround in all of Division 1 and guided Siena to a 15–13 record. The team earned several memorable victories in the regular season, including an 82–74 win against cross-town rival Albany, and an 82–76 triumph at eventual MAAC champion Iona. The Saints clinched a first-round bye in the MAAC tournament with a 98–92 double-overtime victory over Niagara on the team's senior day. Siena's season ended with a 63–62 loss to St. Peter's in the MAAC quarterfinals.

==== 2006–07 ====
McCaffery guided Siena to a 20–12 record in 2007. The Saints began the season with an 11–10 record. However, the team went on a late-season winning streak and won 9 of 10 games. Season highlights included a 76–75 double-overtime victory over rival Albany. Siena was one of the youngest teams in the conference with five underclassmen. The Saints reached the 2007 MAAC championship game and lost to Niagara 83–79.

McCaffery coached three consecutive rookies of the year in their respective leagues. Kyle Hines won the award in the Southern Conference in McCaffery's final year in UNC Greensboro. Kenny Hasbrouck captured the MAAC rookie of the year for the 2005–06 Saints, and Edwin Ubiles shared the award with Canisius' Frank Turner for the 2006–07 season.

==== 2007–08 ====
On November 17, 2007, McCaffery guided Siena to a 79–67 victory over #20 ranked Stanford at the Times Union Center in Albany. The win was Siena's first over a ranked opponent since their first-round victory against the Cardinal in the 1989 NCAA tournament. Siena finished the regular season at 19–10 and 13–5. They tied with Rider for first place in the MAAC. The Saints defeated Manhattan, Loyola and Rider on their way to winning the MAAC championship and an automatic NCAA tournament bid. It was Siena's fourth trip to the NCAA Tournament and their first under the guidance of McCaffery. In March 2008, the 13th seeded Saints soundly defeated #4 Vanderbilt 83–62 in the first round of the NCAA Tournament in the Midwest Region. Siena's season ended one game short of the sweet sixteen in an 84–72 loss to 12th seeded Villanova. Siena finished the season at 23–11. It was the most wins for a Siena team since the 1999–2000 season.

==== 2008–09 ====
Siena was ranked highly in preseason publications entering the 2008–09 season. The Saints convincingly won their first two games against Boise State and Cornell. McCaffery guided Siena to victories in 25 of their final 30 games. Siena won games against St. Joe's, Northern Iowa, Albany and Buffalo along the way. Siena's 16 MAAC wins tied a league record for regular season wins. Siena would go on to win the MAAC championship (and clinch a second straight NCAA tournament bid) by defeating Canisius, Fairfield and Niagara. McCaffery led the Saints to the most single season wins in their Division I history and earned the 2009 MAAC coach of the year.

In the first round of the NCAA Tournament, Siena defeated Ohio State 74–72 in double overtime to reach the round of 32 for the second straight season. The Saints led #1 ranked Louisville 63–59 midway into the 2nd half before losing 79–72 to end their season at 27–8. Siena finished ranked 28th in the final ESPN/USA Today coaches poll, the school's highest ranking.

==== 2009–10 ====
Siena entered the 2009–10 with the highest expectations in program history. After a slow start, the Saints won 15 straight games and 21 of 23 games to capture the school's third consecutive MAAC tournament championship, defeating Fairfield in overtime 72–65. Siena lost to Purdue 72–64 in the first round of the NCAA tournament to end their season at 27–7. McCaffery was also honored by the national coaches' association as an all-district coach.

=== Iowa Hawkeyes ===
==== 2010–11 ====
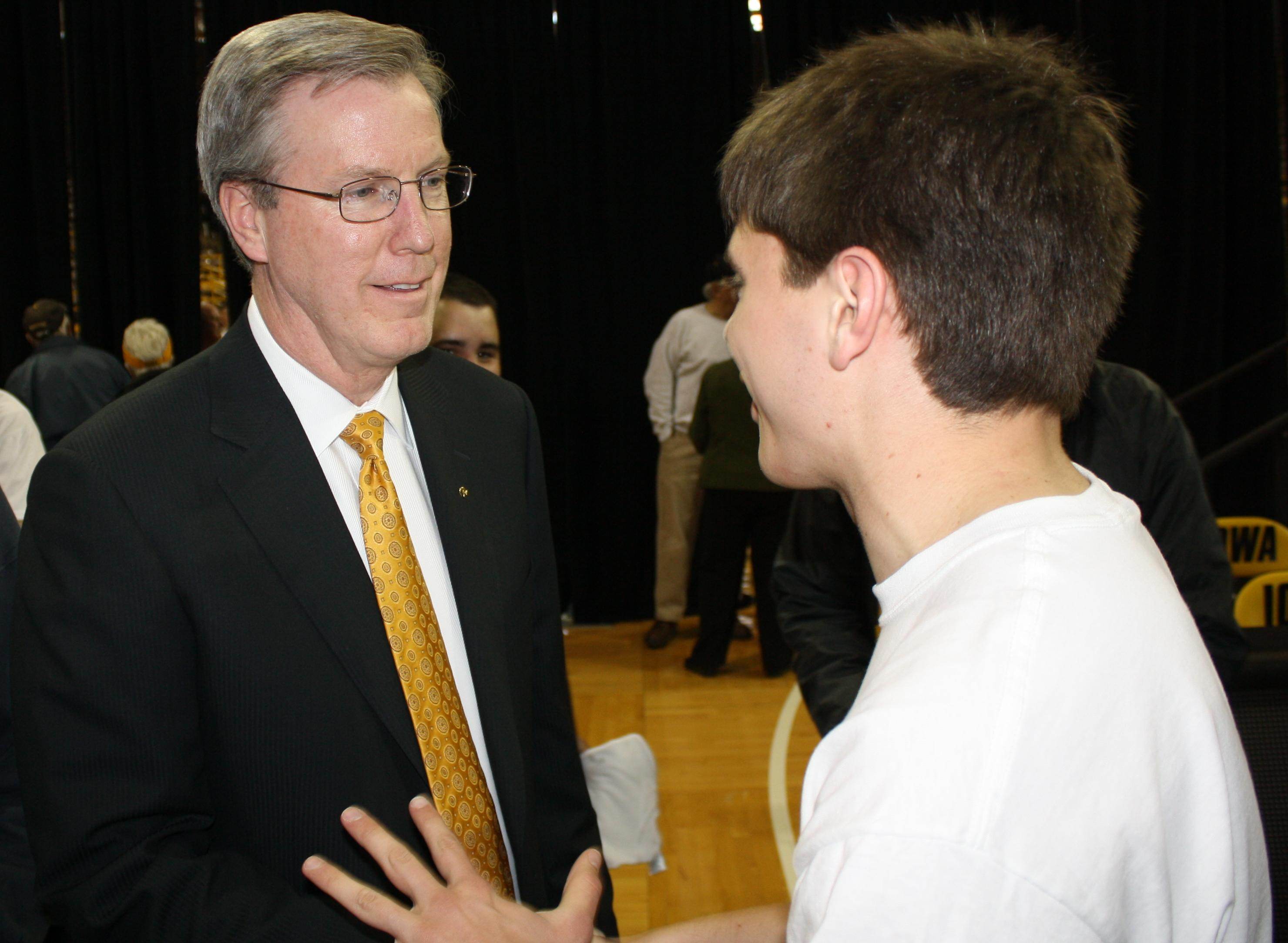
Fran McCaffery talks with an Iowa student after his introduction as the new head basketball coach at The University of Iowa.

McCaffery was hired by the University of Iowa on March 28, 2010, to replace Todd Lickliter. He was introduced during a press conference and a public ceremony in Carver-Hawkeye Arena on March 29, 2010.

McCaffery lost his first game as head coach at Iowa on November 16, 2010, when the Hawkeyes lost to South Dakota State. His first conference win with the Hawkeyes came against Indiana in Iowa City on January 23. His first win versus a ranked team as the head coach of Iowa came on March 5, when Iowa defeated No. 6 Purdue, 67–65. That win snapped a 25-game losing streak against ranked opponents for the Hawkeyes.

==== 2011–12 ====
McCaffery led the Iowa Hawkeyes to 4 wins over ranked opponents – twice against Wisconsin, once against Michigan, and once against Indiana. The Hawkeyes won 3 conference road games in a season for the first time since 2006. For the second consecutive season, attendance increased at Iowa home basketball games.

Iowa beat Illinois in the first round of the Big Ten tournament. The Hawkeyes then lost to eventual tournament champion Michigan State. At 17–16, Iowa earned a bid to the NIT postseason tournament. The Hawkeyes were seeded seventh in their region, but due to a scheduling conflict, they hosted the second seeded Dayton Flyers. Iowa won the contest 84–75, the first postseason win for Iowa since 2004. The NIT bid showed the enthusiasm building around the program, over 13,000 tickets were sold in under twenty-four hours.

During the offseason excitement built about the incoming recruiting class, one of the best in the conference. Iowa native and a member of the Wisconsin Badger Basketball team, Jarrod Uthoff transferred to Iowa. Also during the offseason, McCaffery signed a 7-year contract extension, worth $1.66 million per season.

==== 2012–13 ====
Iowa finished the non-conference schedule with an 11–2 record, including wins over in-state rivals Iowa State and UNI. It was the best non-conference record since the 2004–2005 season, and the best by a McCaffery team at Iowa. Iowa finished the regular season with a 20–11 record including 9–9 in conference play, resulting in an NIT bid. Iowa ended up as the NIT runners-up. McCaffery also picked up his 300th career win as a head coach on March 9 when Iowa beat Nebraska 74–60.

==== 2013–14 ====
Iowa finished the non-conference season with a record of 11–2. The two non-conference losses were to Villanova (88–83 in overtime, in the Battle for Atlantic Title Game) and in-state rival Iowa State (85–82). McCaffery then led his Hawkeyes to a Big Ten record of 9–9 with quality wins at #3 Ohio State (84–74) and at home versus Michigan (85–67). Iowa received the sixth seed in the Big Ten tournament. After beating Northwestern two times during the regular season, Iowa lost to Northwestern (67–62) in the first round of the Big Ten tournament. On Selection Sunday, McCaffery's team was put as the 11th seed having to play a play-in game versus Tennessee. Fran's son was diagnosed with a thyroid tumor in his neck, which eventually became cancer towards the end of the regular season. McCaffery flew home from the play-in game for his son's surgery then flew back to Dayton, Ohio to coach his team to a heartbreaking loss (78–65). The Iowa Hawkeyes ended the season with a record of 20–13.

==== 2014–15 ====
Before the season began, Fran McCaffery received a contract extension through the 2019–2020 season.

The Hawkeyes finished their non-conference schedule 9–4, with losses to #10 Texas (71–57) and #23 Syracuse (66–63) in the 2K Classic. Additional non-conference losses came at the hands of rivals #14 Iowa State (90–75) and UNI (56–44). McCaffery lead Iowa to a 12–6 record in the Big Ten, including memorable wins over #20 Ohio State (71–65) and #17 Maryland (71–55). McCaffrey's Hawkeyes were upset in the second round of the Big Ten tournament by Penn State (67–58), but still finished tied for third in the conference. Iowa earned a 7th seed in the NCAA tournament and beat Davidson (83–52) in the Round of 64 before bowing out to Gonzaga (87–68) in the second round. McCaffery's Hawkeyes finished 22–12 on the year.

==== 2015–16 ====
Iowa finished their non-conference schedule 9–3, with losses to Dayton (82-77), #17 Notre Dame (68–62), and rivals #4 Iowa State (83–82). Coach McCaffery opened Big Ten play with a victory over #1 Michigan State (83–70). The Hawkeyes finished conference play 12–6 for the second straight season, with two wins over ranked Purdue, two wins over Michigan, and a second win over Michigan State, this time ranked #4, 76–59. McCaffrey's Hawkeyes lost to Illinois (68–66) in the first round of the Big Ten tournament, but finished tied for third in the conference for the second straight year. Iowa earned a 7th seed in the NCAA tournament, also for the second straight year, and beat Temple (72–70) in the Round of 64. The Hawkeyes lost in the second round of the tournament for the second year in a row, this time to eventual champion Villanova (87–68). In a year where history seemed to repeat itself, McCaffery's Hawkeyes again won 22 games en route to a 22–11 season.

==== 2016–17 ====
After the 2015–16 season graduated 4 senior starters Iowa got off to a rocky start to the 2016–17 campaign, going 3–5 with losses to Seton Hall (91–83), Virginia (74–41), Memphis (100-92), Notre Dame (92–78), and Nebraska-Omaha (98–89). The Hawkeyes turned things around in December and ended non-conference play with five straight victories, including wins over in-state rivals #25 Iowa State (78–64) and UNI (69–46). Iowa finished non-conference play 8–5 on the year. The Hawkeyes went 10–8 in conference play, with wins over Michigan (86–83), #17 Purdue (83–78), Ohio State (85–72), #24 Maryland (83–69), Indiana (96–90), and #22 Wisconsin (59–57). McCaffery's Hawkeyes were invited to the NIT post-season tournament and defeated South Dakota (87–75) before losing in overtime to eventual champion TCU (94–92), finishing their season 19–15. Senior Peter Jok lead the Big Ten in scoring (19.9 ppg) and was first-team all-conference.

==== 2017–18 ====
The 2017–18 season was a disaster for the Hawkeyes. After losing the Big Ten leading scorer, Peter Jok, a young Iowa team struggled to find their identity. Coach McCaffery's eldest son, Connor, joined the team as an ESPN four-star recruit out of local Iowa City West, but battled a series of ailments, including mononucleosis, which lead to being granted a medical redshirt year. Iowa finished the season 14–19, 4–14 in Big Ten play in a three-way tie for 11th place. As the No. 12 seed in the Big Ten tournament, they defeated Illinois before losing to Michigan in the second round.

==== 2018–19 ====
A young Iowa team won the 2K Sports Classic early in the season, defeating #13 Oregon (77–69) and UConn (91–72) in back-to-back nights at Madison Square Garden. The Hawkeyes would go undefeated in non-conference play, with wins over in-state rivals Iowa State (98–84) and UNI (77–54). They also scored a whopping 68 points in the first half of a 105–78 win over Alabama State and beat Savannah State by 46 (110–64). Iowa's season featured several thrilling contests, including a 1-point victory over Pitt (69–68), and buzzer-beating wins in back-to-back games against Northwestern (80-79) and Rutgers (71–69). Iowa just missed a chance to make it three last-second victories in a row, but a shot as time expired rimmed out against #24 Maryland (66–65). Other notable regular season victories for Iowa included wins over #24 Nebraska (93–84), #16 Ohio State (72–62), and #5 Michigan (74–59). The Hawkeyes ended the regular season on a 4-game losing streak. In the Big Ten tournament, Iowa defeated Illinois before falling to Michigan. The Hawkeyes earned the No. 10 seed in the South Regional in the NCAA Tournament. In the first round, the Hawkeyes came from behind to upset seventh-seed Cincinnati (79–72). Then, Iowa faced off against second seed Tennessee in the Round of 32. The Hawkeyes came back from a 25-point deficit in the first half to send the game to overtime, which was won by Tennessee.

==== 2019–20 ====
The 2019-20 season saw Iowa complete a 9-2 non-conference schedule with notable wins over rival Iowa State (84–68), and #12 ranked Texas Tech (72–61). The Iowa squad was led by standout center Luka Garza, who averaged 23.9 points and 9.8 rebounds en route to numerous accolades. Garza would go on to win the Big Ten Player of the Year, Sporting News Men's College Basketball Player of the Year, Pete Newell Big Man Award, Kareem Abdul-Jabbar Award, and consensus All-American honors while leading the Hawkeyes to a 20–11 record that featured conference wins over #12 Maryland (67–49), #19 Michigan (90–83), #24 Rutgers (85–80), #19 Illinois (72–65), #25 Ohio State (85–76), and #16 Penn State (77–68). The 2019–20 season ended abruptly with the outbreak of the COVID-19 coronavirus without a postseason being played. McCaffery's younger son, Patrick, another ESPN four-star recruit, joined the team as a freshman but took a medical redshirt while recovering from the residual effects thyroid cancer treatment.

==== 2020–21 ====
The start of the 2020–21 basketball season saw McCaffery's Hawkeyes as the #5 ranked team in AP pre-season poll. The team returned every starter from a squad that finished 20–11 in a COVID-shortened 2019–20 season, including Naismith Player of the Year favorite Luka Garza. Garza would go on to win his second consecutive Big Ten Player of the Year, while also being named a consensus All-American for the second time. Iowa earned a 2 seed in the NCAA Tournament which is tied for best in school history. Despite earning a 2 seed, after beating #15 seed Grand Canyon in the first round, the Hawkeyes were upset by 7th seed Oregon in the second round 96–80, ending their season at 22–9.

==== 2021–22 ====
McCaffery had the difficult task of replacing National Player of the Year and Iowa legend Luka Garza, and the emergence of star Keegan Murray helped do just that. Iowa ended non-conference play with a record of 10–1, with the only loss coming to in-state rivals Iowa State. Halfway through Big Ten play, the Hawkeyes had a record of just 4-6, but then took off to end the season. Iowa ended the regular season winning eight of its last 10 games, including wins over Michigan State and road wins at Maryland, Ohio State, and Michigan. The Hawkeyes continued that momentum into the Big Ten Tournament, as the #5 seed, Iowa made a then-Big Ten tournament record 18 three pointers in a 112–76 win over Northwestern in the first round. They then beat #4 seed Rutgers in the second round, advancing to the Big Ten semifinals for the second consecutive season. In the semifinals, Iowa faced Indiana and after trailing for a majority of the game, Iowa had a furious rally, scoring 19 points in the final 4:18 of the game, capped off by a 30 foot Jordan Bohannon three with 0.5 left to give Iowa an 80–77 win and advancing them to the Final for the first time under McCaffery. In the Final, the Hawkeyes faced 3rd seeded Purdue, a team Iowa had lost to twice in the regular season. Despite a rare off game from Keegan Murray (19 points on 6/16 shooting), the Hawkeye role players were able to step up as Iowa controlled the game, leading for nearly 34 minutes. Iowa beat the Boilermakers 75–66 to capture their first Big Ten Tournament championship under Fran McCaffery. Iowa earned a #5 seed and despite all the momentum from the end of the season, the Hawkeyes were upset in the first round by 12th seeded Richmond 67–63, abruptly ending their season with a 26–10 record. After the season, star forward Keegan Murray declared for the NBA draft, where he was selected 4th overall by the Sacramento Kings.

==== 2022–23 ====
After losing Keegan Murray to the NBA Draft, McCaffery once again had the difficult task of trying to overcome the loss of his star player. In 2022-23, Keegan's twin brother Kris took over the role as the number 1 option and did so very well. Iowa was a very up and down team in 2023, starting 8-2 with wins on the road over Seton Hall 83–67, and a dominating win over in-state rivals Iowa State, without Kris Murray. However, the Hawkeyes would then lose its next four games, including a home loss to Eastern Illinois. However, Iowa would turn that around by winning its next four games, with wins over nationally ranked Indiana and Maryland. Iowa really struggled to win games on the road in conference play as it started 10–8, but was just 2–7 in road games before crushing 15th ranked Indiana 90–68 at Assembly Hall. The Hawkeyes however, would lose its last three games, being upset by Nebraska in the regular season finale, and by Ohio State in the first round of the Big Ten Tournament. Iowa made the NCAA Tournament once again, this time as a #8 seed and were matched up with Auburn in the first round, coached by former Iowa assistant coach Bruce Pearl. After falling behind by as many as 18 points in the second half, Iowa, as they had done all season, cut the lead to within 4 points with just over 4 minutes, but failed to complete the comeback, losing the game 83–75 and being knocked out in the first round of the NCAA Tournament for the second consecutive season. Kris Murray entered the NBA Draft after the season and like his brother, was selected in the first round, going to the Portland Trail Blazers with the 23rd overall pick.

==== 2023–24 ====
For the third season in a row, McCaffery and Iowa had to replace an all-american. The 2023–24 season was a down season for the Hawkeyes as they started the season just 5–5, including a home loss to a terrible Michigan team in which McCaffery was ejected. Iowa would then win 6 of its next 7 games, capped off by a win on the road over Minnesota where McCaffery passed Tom Davis for the most wins in school history. From there, Iowa never really gained any momentum, stumbling to a 6–8 conference record. Iowa did make a late run at the tournament, defeating three NCAA Tournament teams (Wisconsin, and road wins over Michigan State and Northwestern in a span of 5 contests. However Iowa lost to rival Illinois in the regular season finale and for the second consecutive season lost to Ohio State in the Big Ten Tournament. For the first time since the 2017–18 season, Iowa failed to make the NCAA Tournament, earning a #3 seed in the NIT. Iowa defeated Kansas State at home in the first round 90–81, before losing at Utah in the second round, also by a 90–81 score. Iowa ended the season with a 19–15 record and were 10–10 in Big Ten play.

==== 2024–25 ====
Iowa had hopes of returning to the NCAA Tournament in the 2024–25 season, especially after forward Payton Sandfort chose to return to Iowa for his senior season. However, injuries and inconsistent play derailed the Hawkeyes all season long. Sandfort dealt with various injuries all season, starting with a wrist injury suffered in the 4th game of the season against Washington State and then later a shoulder injury, leading to his inconsistent season. Freshman forward Cooper Koch was injured in December and did not play again. Transfers Seydou Traore and Drew Thelwell both dealt with nagging injuries for a good portion of the year, and star center Owen Freeman had surgery on a broken finger in early February, causing him to miss the final 12 games of the season. Even despite the injuries, Iowa really struggled in Big Ten play, especially on defense as they allowed 90 points or more seven times. Iowa was able to qualify for the Big Ten Tournament after an upset win over Nebraska on the road in the season finale. Iowa earned the #15 seed in the Big Ten Tournament, where they again met Ohio State for the third consecutive season. However, this time the Hawkeyes were victorious, upsetting Ohio State 77–70. Iowa was then defeated by #7 seed Illinois 106-94 in the second round of the Big Ten Tournament and McCaffery was ejected from the game. Iowa finished the season 17–16, 7–13, both worst marks under McCaffery since the 2017–18 season and saw dwindling fan interest and attendance. At the conclusion of the season, McCaffery was fired after 15 seasons as the Iowa head coach. He ended his tenure with a 297–207 record, made 7 NCAA Tournament appearances with one Big Ten tournament championship while never reaching past the Second Round.

=== Penn Quakers ===
==== 2025–26 ====
On March 25, 2025, the student newspaper of the University of Pennsylvania, The Daily Pennsylvanian, reported that a deal was imminent for McCaffery to become the Quakers' 23rd men's head basketball coach. His Quakers won the Ivy League tournament in his first year and clinched an NCAA tournament berth.

== Head coaching record ==
Record table
Season	Team	Overall	Conference	Standing	Postseason
Lehigh Engineers (East Coast Conference) (1985–1988)
1985–86	Lehigh	13–15	6–8	5th	
1986–87	Lehigh	15–14	8–6	T–3rd	
1987–88	Lehigh	21–10	8–6	T–4th	NCAA Division I Round of 64
Lehigh:		49–39 (.557)	22–20 (.524)		
UNC Greensboro Spartans (Southern Conference) (1999–2005)
1999–00	UNC Greensboro	15–13	9–7	3rd (North)	
2000–01	UNC Greensboro	19–12	10–6	2nd (North)	NCAA Division I Round of 64
2001–02	UNC Greensboro	20–11	11–5	T–1st (North)	NIT First Round
2002–03	UNC Greensboro	7–22	3–13	6th (North)	
2003–04	UNC Greensboro	11–17	7–9	T–3rd (North)	
2004–05	UNC Greensboro	18–12	9–7	2nd (North)	
UNC Greensboro:		90–87 (.508)	49–47 (.510)		
Siena Saints (Metro Atlantic Athletic Conference) (2005–2010)
2005–06	Siena	15–13	10–8	4th	
2006–07	Siena	20–12	12–6	T–3rd	
2007–08	Siena	23–11	13–5	T–1st	NCAA Division I Round of 32
2008–09	Siena	27–8	16–2	1st	NCAA Division I Round of 32
2009–10	Siena	27–7	17–1	1st	NCAA Division I Round of 64
Siena:		112–51 (.687)	68–22 (.756)		
Iowa Hawkeyes (Big Ten Conference) (2010–2025)
2010–11	Iowa	11–20	4–14	10th	
2011–12	Iowa	18–17	8–10	T–7th	NIT Second Round
2012–13	Iowa	25–13	9–9	6th	NIT Runner-up
2013–14	Iowa	20–13	9–9	6th	NCAA Division I First Four
2014–15	Iowa	22–12	12–6	T–3rd	NCAA Division I Round of 32
2015–16	Iowa	22–11	12–6	T–3rd	NCAA Division I Round of 32
2016–17	Iowa	19–15	10–8	T–5th	NIT Second Round
2017–18	Iowa	14–19	4–14	T–11th	
2018–19	Iowa	23–12	10–10	6th	NCAA Division I Round of 32
2019–20	Iowa	20–11	11–9	T–5th	NCAA Tournament cancelled due to COVID-19
2020–21	Iowa	22–9	14–6	3rd	NCAA Division I Round of 32
2021–22	Iowa	26–10	12–8	T–4th	NCAA Division I Round of 64
2022–23	Iowa	19–14	11–9	T-5th	NCAA Division I Round of 64
2023–24	Iowa	19–15	10–10	T–6th	NIT Second Round
2024–25	Iowa	17–16	7–13	T–12th	
Iowa:		297–207 (.589)	143–141 (.504)		
Penn Quakers (Ivy League) (2025–present)
2025–26	Penn	18–12	9–5	3rd	NCAA Division I Round of 64
2026–27	Penn	3–3			
Penn:		21–15 (.583)	9–5 (.643)		
Total:		568–399 (.587)			
National champion Postseason invitational champion Conference regular season champion Conference regular season and conference tournament champion Division regular season champion Division regular season and conference tournament champion Conference tournament champion

== Personal life ==
Growing up in the Philadelphia suburbs, McCaffery attended Ancillae-Assumpta Academy ('73) and La Salle College High School ('77). He and his wife Margaret have four children: sons Connor, Patrick, and Jonathan, and a daughter, Marit. McCaffery is actively involved with Coaches vs. Cancer in the Capital Region. The McCafferys are also involved with the Johnson County (Iowa City) Relay For Life. His brother Jack is a sports columnist for the Delaware County (Pa.) Daily Times.

McCaffery's wife, Margaret, was a standout women's basketball player from Saint Paul, Minnesota. She had an outstanding college career playing at the University of Notre Dame from 1988-1992.

In 2014 McCaffery's son, Patrick, was taken to the University of Iowa hospitals to have a thyroid tumor removed. After testing, the tumor was found to be cancerous. Patrick was 14 at the time, but went on to become the all-time leading scorer in basketball at West High School in Iowa City.

McCaffery's son, Connor, played for his father at Iowa. He was considered to be a top 250 recruit in the country. Connor also played baseball for the Iowa Hawkeyes baseball team. He is currently an assistant men's basketball coach at Butler University, and is known for his ongoing relationship with Caitlin Clark.

In 2018, Patrick McCaffery joined his brother Connor by committing to Iowa. He was considered a top 125 recruit for the class of 2019. Patrick played at Iowa before transferring to Butler for his final college season in 2024–25.
