= Kenny Hasbrouck =

American basketball player

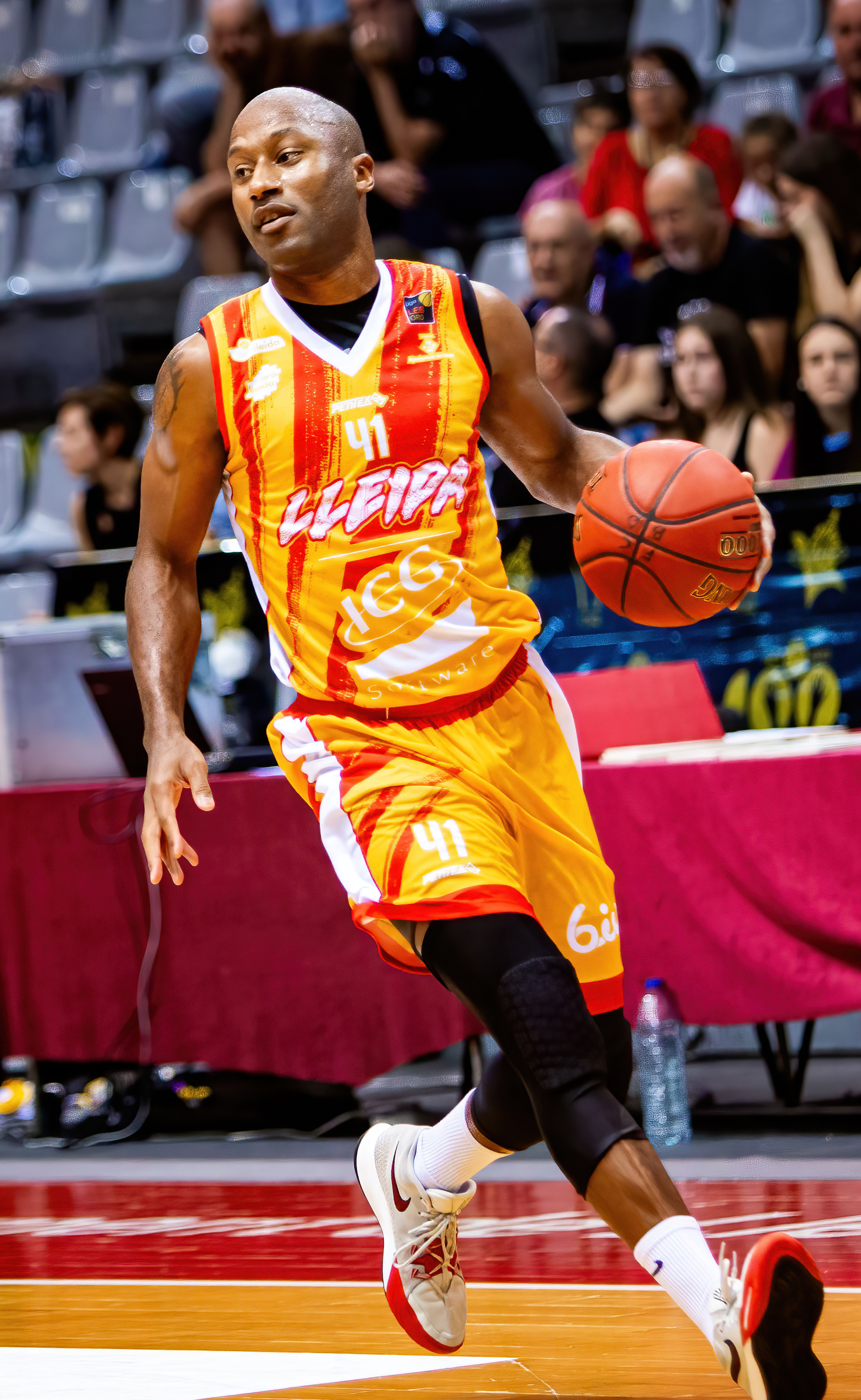
- Hasbrouck with Força Lleida in 2023

No. 41 – Trepça
- Position: Shooting guard
- League: Kosovo Basketball Superleague

Personal information
- Born: August 14, 1986 (age 40) Washington, D.C., U.S.
- Listed height: 6 ft 3 in (1.91 m)
- Listed weight: 194 lb (88 kg)

Career information
- High school: Cardinal Gibbons (Baltimore, Maryland)
- College: Siena (2005–2009)
- NBA draft: 2009: undrafted
- Playing career: 2009–present

Career history
- 2009–2010: Miami Heat
- 2010: Rio Grande Valley Vipers
- 2010–2011: Lucentum Alicante
- 2011–2012: Oldenburg
- 2012–2013: Virtus Bologna
- 2013–2014: Mersin BB
- 2014–2015: Pallacanestro Ferrara
- 2015–2016: Cantù
- 2016: Virtus Bologna
- 2016–2017: Casalpusterlengo
- 2017–2018: Aurora Jesi
- 2018–2019: Fortitudo Bologna
- 2019–2020: Scaligera Verona
- 2020–2021: Pallacanestro Ferrara
- 2021–2022: Pallacanestro Biella
- 2022–2023: Cáceres Ciudad del Baloncesto
- 2023–2024: Força Lleida
- 2024: Spartans Distrito Capital
- 2024–2025: Força Lleida
- 2025: Dorados de Chihuahua
- 2025–present: Trepça

Career highlights
- Kosovo Superleague champion (2026); Italian Serie A2 (basketball) Championship with Fortitudo Bologna (2019); Primera FEB Championship with Força Lleida CE leading the team to Spain's Liga ACB Promotion (2024); Kosovo Cup winner (2026); MAAC Player of the Year (2009); 2× First-team All-MAAC (2008, 2009); No. 41 retired by Siena Saints
- Stats at NBA.com
- Stats at Basketball Reference

Kenny Hasbrouck (born Kenneth Hasbrouck on August 14, 1986) is an American professional basketball player for Trepça of the Kosovo Basketball Superleague. He formerly played college basketball for the Siena Saints, who retired his jersey and later inducted him into their Athletic Hall of Fame Class.

== College ==
After graduating from the Cardinal Gibbons (Baltimore, Maryland), Hasbrouck played a post-graduate season with Maine Central Institute. He committed to Siena, playing in the Metro Atlantic Athletic Conference (MAAC) of the NCAA Division I, in May 2005, as coach Fran McCaffery's first recruit.

Haasbrouck started all 28 games he played in as a freshman, averaging 12.4 points, 4.3 rebounds and 2.6 assists per game. He was eight time MAAC Rookie of the Week on the way to an MAAC Rookie of the Year award.

He again started all games he played (32) during his sophomore season, posting an MAAC eighth best 16 points per game to earn a Second Team All-MAAC selection. His averages rose to 20.3 points per game in the MAAC tournament, including 26 as Siena upset top-seed Marist to reach the final, culminating in a selection to the All-Tournament Team.

In his 34 games played (all starts) as a junior, he had 16.1 points (becoming to third fastest player in Siena history to reach 1,000 points with a career 1,405 points), 2.2 assists and 2.3 steals (league best) per game. He made the First Team All-MAAC and Second Team NABC District 2. After going scoreless in the first half of the 2008 MAAC tournament semi-final against Loyola, he scored 17 points in the second half to erase a likewise Loyola lead and help the Saints reach the final. Another 17 points followed in the final against Rider to clinch the tournament for Siena, with Hasbrouck the MAAC Tournament MVP. For his first participation in the NCAA tournament, he scored a game-high 30 points against Vanderbilt to help Siena advance to the Round of 32.

2008–2009: Siena College Male Student-Athlete of the Year...CollegeInsider.com Mid-Major Player of the Year...CollegeInsider.com Mid-Major All-American. He added Collegeinsider.com Mid-Major Player of the Year and Siena ale Student-Athlete of the Year to his honours list.

As a senior, Hasbrouck was named MAAC Player of the Year. He scored 19 points as Siena beat Niagara in the MAAC Tournament final, with Hasbrouck again MAAC Tournament MVP.

Hasbrouck finished his Siena career with career totals of 1,917 points (fourth all-time best) and 248 steals (all-time best), he was one of only four Saints basketball players to have their jersey (#41) retired. He was inducted into Siena's Athletic Hall of Fame Class of 2014 on a first ballot attempt.

== Professional career ==
Undrafted in the 2009 NBA draft, Hasbrouck took part in the Miami Heat’s summer mini-camp but missed training camp proper with an injury. He then joined the Rio Grande Valley Vipers of the NBA Development League. On 16 March 2010, the Heat signed Hasbrouck to a 10-day contract. He was re-signed to second 10-day contract, then for the rest of the season on 5 April 2010. He participated in the 2010 NBA Summer League, averaging 13.6 points, 2.4 rebounds and 2.4 assists in more than 28 minutes per game, following which his contract was extended by the Heat on 28 July 2010. He was released in October 2010, before the start of the NBA season.

In December 2010 he signed with Spanish Liga ACB side Meridiano Alicante for the rest of the 2010–11 season.

In the 2011 summer, he moved to German side EWE Baskets Oldenburg for the 2011–12 season. The next season saw him moved to the Italian Serie A, spending 2012–13 with Oknoplast Bologna, with 11,9 points, 2.3 assists and 1.9 rebounds on average. In December 2013, Hasbrouck signed a contract to play with Mersin BB of the Turkish Basketball League.

He spent the 2014–15 season with Mobyt Ferrara of the Italian second division Serie A2 Silver, finishing as the league's top scorer with 20,4 points per game, to which he added 3.2 rebounds and 2.7 assists. On August 11, 2015, Hasbrouck signed with Serie A outfit Acqua Vitasnella Cantù. On January 22, 2016, he left Cantù and signed with his former team Virtus Bologna for the rest of the season. He played for the Serie A2 team Aurora Jesi in 2017–18 and averaged 18.2 points per game. Hasbrouck joined Fortitudo Pallacanestro Bologna on July 2, 2018. During the 2019–20 season, Hasbrouck averaged 14 points and 2 assists per game for Scaligera Verona. He signed with Pallacanestro Ferrara on June 24, 2020.

== The Basketball Tournament ==
Kenny Hasbrouck played for Saints Alive in the 2018 edition of The Basketball Tournament. He scored 21 points and had 2 steals in the team's first-round loss to Team Fancy.
