= Siena Saints men's basketball =

NCAA Division 1 program

2026–27 Siena Saints men's basketball team
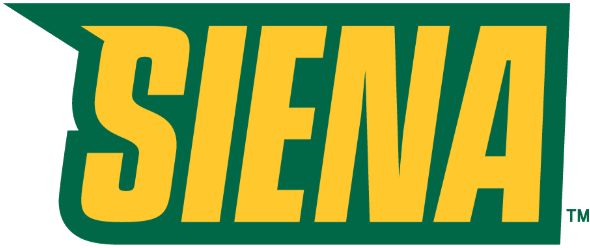
- University: Siena University
- First season: 1938–39; 88 years ago
- Head coach: Nevada Smith (1st season)
- Location: Albany, New York
- Arena: MVP Arena (capacity: 15,229)
- NCAA division: Division I
- Conference: Metro
- Nickname: Saints
- Colors: Green and gold
- All-time record: 1,228–1,066 (.535)

NCAA Division I tournament round of 32
- 1974*, 1989, 2008, 2009

NCAA Division I tournament appearances
- 1974*, 1989, 1999, 2002, 2008, 2009, 2010, 2026

Conference tournament champions
- 1999, 2002, 2008, 2009, 2010, 2026; NAC: 1989

Conference regular-season champions
- 1988, 1989, 1991, 1999, 2000, 2001, 2008, 2009, 2010, 2020, 2021

Uniforms
Home	Away	Alternate
- * at Division II level

The Siena Saints men's basketball team (formerly the Siena Indians) represents Siena University in Loudonville, New York, United States. The NCAA Division I program competes in the Metro Atlantic Athletic Conference and the annual Franciscan Cup. The Saints are currently coached by Nevada Smith. He replaced Gerry McNamara who left for the head coaching job at his alma mater Syracuse on March 24, 2026 after 2 seasons.

Siena plays its home games at the 14,500 all-seater MVP Arena in downtown Albany. Prior to joining a conference, Siena had success in the 1950s, winning the National Catholic Invitational Tournament in 1950 and finishing the 1950–51 season ranked 18th in the AP poll. Since 1988, the team has appeared in seven NCAA tournaments (1989, 1999, 2002, 2008, 2009, 2010, and 2026) and five National Invitation Tournaments (1988, 1991, 1994, 2000, and 2003). Siena has advanced to the Round of 32 three times in program history. In 1989 they defeated 3rd-seeded Stanford 80–78. In 2008 Siena beat 4th seeded Vanderbilt 83–62 and the following year they edged 8th seeded Ohio State 74–72 in double overtime.

Siena has won seven conference tournaments throughout program history. They won the 1989 title in the North Atlantic Conference, with a win over Boston University, famously played in front of no fans as a result of a measles outbreak. They have won seven conference championships as a member of the Metro Atlantic Athletic Conference. Their most recent championship came in 2026 when they won the MAAC tournament defeating Merrimack 64-54 for the title and automatic bid to the NCAA tournament. Siena was a 16 seed and took the tournament’s overall number one seed Duke to the wire leading by 13 points with 17 minutes left before running out of gas losing 71-65 in the Round of 64.

In 2014 Siena competed in their first College Basketball Invitational tournament and won the championship defeating Stony Brook, Penn State, Illinois State and Fresno State two games to one in the best-of-three championship series. Siena's cumulative record in postseason play is 18–14 (4–7 NCAA, 9–5 NIT, 5–2 CBI). In 2020, the program was placed under a three-year probation by the NCAA over player benefit and coaching violations under former head coach Jimmy Patsos.

== History ==
=== 1989–2000 ===
In 1989, Marc Brown and Steve McCoy led the school to an 80–78 win over third seeded Stanford in the NCAA Tournament. The 1993–1994 Saints finished 25–8, reaching the NIT final four at Madison Square Garden, defeating such teams as Georgia Tech, Tulane, Bradley, and Kansas State. Siena's Doremus Bennerman capped his college career with 51 points against Kansas State, winning most outstanding player honors in the NIT.

Brown (2,284) and Bennerman (2,109) are the only two men to score 2,000 points or more while at Siena.

After coach Mike Deane (166–77 in 8 years at Siena) left to take the head coaching job at Marquette, Siena suffered through a terrible 22–59 three-year tenure under Bob Beyer, who was fired. Siena then hired Villanova assistant Paul Hewitt to resurrect the program. Hewitt did so leading the Saints to a 66–27 record during his three years, winning the MAAC tournament championship in 1999 and taking regular season crown in 2000. Hewitt would leave after the 1999–2000 season to take over at Georgia Tech.

=== 2000–04 ===
Louis Orr coached the team for one season (20–11) before leaving for Seton Hall University. Siena then hired Rob Lanier, an assistant under Rick Barnes at University of Texas. In Lanier's first year Siena struggled through a brutal regular season going 12–18. However the team went on to win the MAAC championship on their home floor and become the first team since Bradley in 1955 to win an NCAA Tournament game with a losing record as they defeated Alcorn State 81–77 in the play in game. Siena would gain an NIT berth in 2003, going 21–11 and beating Big East member Providence along the way. They defeated Villanova and Western Michigan in the NIT before being eliminated by Alabama-Birmingham. Lanier's final two years brought much frustration among Siena fans. In 2003–04, Siena started off 3–0 only to lose their next 10 games and finish the season a disappointing 14–16. Lanier's final year saw an injury-plagued Siena team finish with a program worst 24 losses and he was fired after that season.

=== Coach McCaffery ===
==== 2005–06 ====
Fran McCaffery was hired to April 1, 2005 as the 14th coach in Siena history, the 8th at the Division 1 level. McCaffery inherited a team with only a handful of scholarship athletes because several players loyal to coach Lanier transferred to other programs, including Jack McClinton, who went on to earn first team all-ACC honors at the University of Miami. McCaffery's first recruit landed was Kenny Hasbrouck who would go on to score 1,917 points at Siena, earning MAAC Rookie of the Year, MAAC Player of the Year and Mid-Major Player of the Year honors along the way. Hasbrouck started all 128 of his games as a Saint and upon graduation became only the second Siena player to have his jersery retired.

McCaffery guided Siena to a 15–13 record despite being picked to finish last in the Metro Atlantic Athletic Conference. Siena had memorable wins over cross-town rival Albany 82–74 in overtime, as well as an 82–76 triumph at eventual MAAC champion Iona. The Saints clinched a first round bye in the MAAC tournament with a thrilling 98–92 double overtime victory over Niagara on senior day. Siena's season ended with a heartbreaking 63–62 loss to St. Peter's in the MAAC quarterfinals.

==== 2006–07 ====
The Saints started slowly at 11–10 before winning 9 of 10 games to reach the MAAC championship game losing to Niagara 83–79. Siena finished at 20–12, winning 20 or more games for the fifth time in nine seasons. Once again Siena defeated Albany in another instant classic game 76–75 in double overtime. Siena was one of the youngest teams in the conference as five of their top eight players were underclassmen.

Freshman Edwin Ubiles shared the Rookie of the Year award in the MAAC becoming the second player in as many years to win it for the Saints. Kenny Hasbrouck captured the honor in 2005–2006.

==== 2007–08 ====
On November 17 McCaffery guided Siena to a 79–67 win over #20 Stanford University in Albany, NY at the MVP Arena (formerly the Times Union Center). The victory was Siena's first over a ranked opponent since the 1989 NCAA tournament first round also against Stanford. Siena once again defeated Albany 75–71 for their sixth win in seven tries against the Great Danes since the series resumed. Siena dominated their Bracketbuster game against Boise State, another quality mid-major school. The Saints defeated Manhattan, Loyola College (MD), and Rider to win the MAAC tournament and clinch a bid in the NCAA Tournament.

During Selection Sunday, the Saints received a #13 seed in the Midwest Region of the 2008 NCAA tournament. The Saints went on to upset the 4th seeded Vanderbilt Commodores in the first round of the tournament 83–62. The Saints were led by junior Kenny Hasbrouck who scored a team high 30 points. Senior guard Tay Fisher came off the bench to add 19 points on 6-for-6 shooting from 3-point range. The Saints never trailed in the contest and became the first MAAC team to advance since the 2004 tournament.

In the second round of the tournament, the Saints found themselves facing the #12 seed Villanova Wildcats on March 23, 2008. With 25 points from Scottie Reynolds and 20 points from Corey Stokes, the Wildcats cruised to an 84–72 victory over the Saints and Villanova advanced to the sweet sixteen.

Siena was ranked 9th in the final mid-major poll on Collegeinsider.com.

==== 2008–09 ====
Siena finished the 2008–09 season with a 23–7 regular season record. Quality wins from the Saints came in the opening game of the season against Boise State, who they beat by 30, an 18-point victory against Cornell (Ivy League Conference champions and a #14 seed in the 2008 NCAA tournament), and a 6-point victory against Northern Iowa (the Missouri Valley Conference Champions and a #12 seed) in the ESPN Bracketbusters game that wasn't as close as the score indicated. Siena finished a perfect 17–0 at MVP Arena.

Siena's very tough non-conference schedule included losses to Tennessee (a #9 seed) by 14, Oklahoma State (a #8 seed) by 9, Pittsburgh (#1 seed) by 13, and Kansas (#3 seed) by 7. Siena's strong showings in these tough matchups earned Siena a well-deserved #9 seed. The Saints cruised through the MAAC Tournament to receive the automatic bid into the 2009 NCAA tournament for the second straight year. Siena was awarded a #9 seed in the Midwest region, where they drew #8 Ohio State in Dayton, Ohio. Siena defeated Ohio State 74–72 in a double overtime thriller with Ronald Moore making two late three point shots that earned fame for Bill Raftery’s “Onions, Double Order” call. Siena would go on to lose to the #1 seeded Louisville Cardinals in the second round 79–72 after taking a four-point lead with under 7 minutes left. They ended their season at 27–8.

Siena finished #2 in the final mid-major poll behind only national powerhouse Gonzaga.

Siena finished 28th in the final ESPN coaches poll the schools highest ever ranking. Siena also finished with an RPI of 19.

==== 2009–10 ====
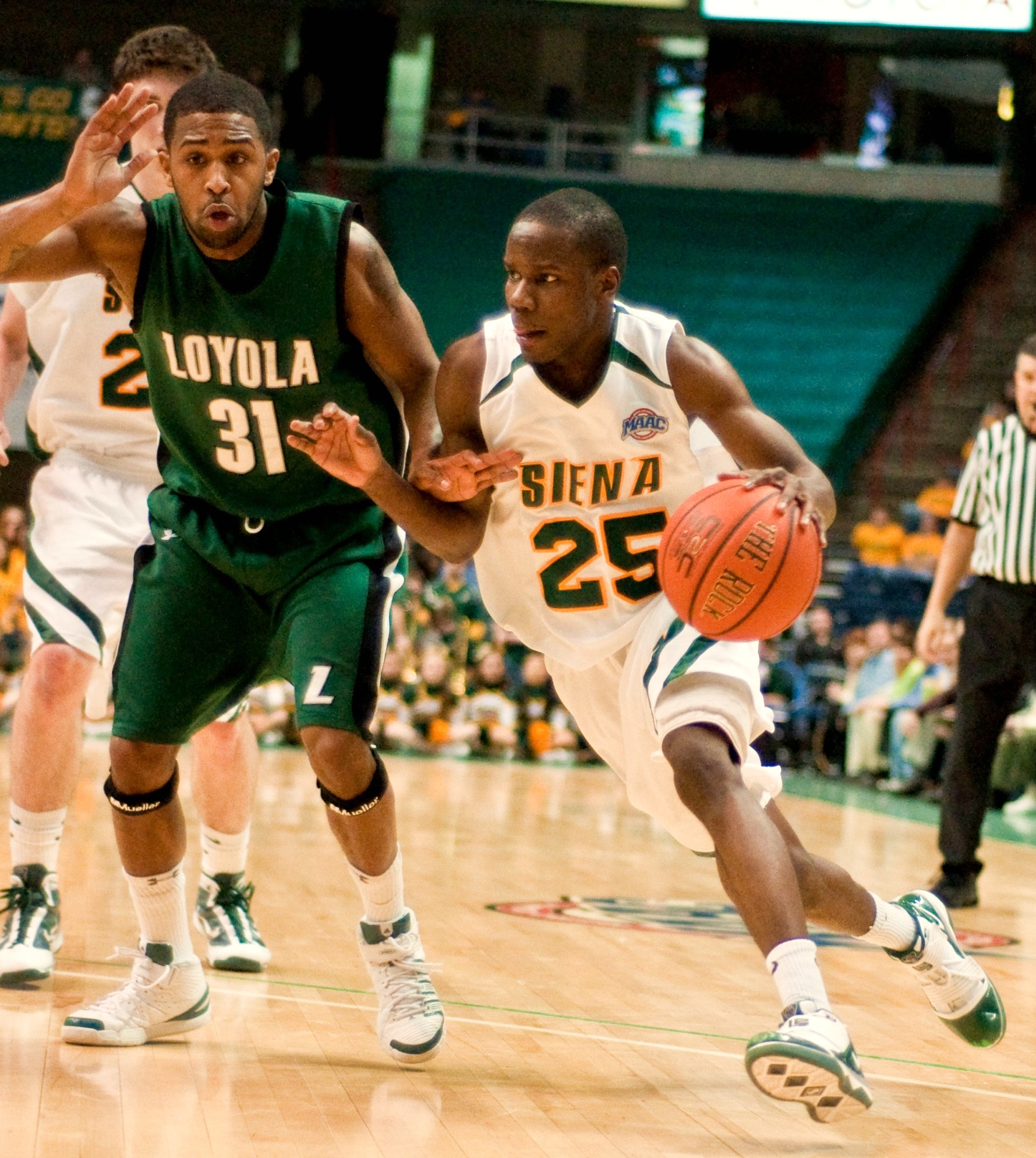
Siena guard Ronald Moore dribbles toward the basket in a game against Loyola in January 2010.

Siena entered the 2009–10 season with the highest expectations in program history. Another slow start put the Saints at 4–3 after a loss at Georgia Tech. Once again Siena made their move going 23–3 to capture their third straight MAAC championship and berth in the NCAA tournament. Siena defeated Fairfield 72–65 in the MAAC championship game in a heart-stopping finish in overtime after trailing by 13 points early in the second half. Alex Franklin was named MAAC tournament MVP in addition to winning the conference's player of the year award.

Siena set a single season record for MAAC regular season wins (17). Despite dominating the MAAC (winning 44 of their last 47 conference games dating back to 2008) the Saints struggled in the second half losing road games to elite team such as Temple, Butler, Georgia Tech and Northern Iowa. Siena's late rally came up short against fourth seeded Purdue in a 72–64 loss in the first round of the NCAA tournament. Siena finished 27–7 the second straight season the school won 27 games.

=== Coach Buonaguro ===
==== 2010–13 ====
Long time Siena assistant coach Mitch Buonaguro took over as head coach after McCaffery left for Iowa. The Saints struggled through a 13–18 season that ended with a 94–64 loss to Iona in the MAAC quarterfinals. Siena's marquee win was a 62–57 triumph over Georgia Tech at the MVP Arena.

Siena finished 14–17 and 8–10 (6th in the MAAC). Despite a second straight losing season, Siena enjoyed a much more positive season after a struggling first year under Buonaguro. Because of injuries and NCAA ineligibility the Saints most of the season with only a 6-man rotation. Siena had solid wins over MAAC regular champion and NCAA tournament participant Iona (rallying from 20–2 down), Manhattan, Fairfield, Princeton and UAlbany. In the MAAC tournament, Siena beat Manhattan again 84–82 in overtime before falling to eventual tournament champion Loyola 70–60 in the MAAC semifinals. It was the 12th time in the last 15 seasons that Siena had at least made it to the conference semifinals.

In 2012–13 Siena struggled again and recorded three straight losing season for the first time since 1994–1997. The Saints finished the season at 8–24 and coach Mitch Buonaguro was fired.

=== Coach Patsos ===
==== 2013–18 ====
On April 3, 2013, Siena introduced Loyola coach Jimmy Patsos as the 16th head coach in Siena history. In his first year, Patsos guided the Saints to a 20–18 record (11–9 in MAAC conference play) and the program's first-ever postseason championship, winning the 2014 CBI tournament two games to one over Fresno State. The home portion of the three-game series was noteworthy; both games were played at the Alumni Recreation Center on the Siena campus as the MVP Arena was being used for another event.

In Summer 2015, it was announced that Siena would open up its 2015–16 season with away games against the defending Nation Champional Duke Blue Devils and the National runner-up Wisconsin Badgers. Although the odds were heavily in favor of Duke and Wisconsin winning these games, this announcement immediately created an enormous amount of hype around the Siena College campus and the MAAC Conference as a whole. This made the Saints the first Division 1 team to ever open the season against the defending National Champion and the National runner-up from the previous year.

On November 13, 2015, Siena played Duke at Cameroon Indoor Stadium, one of the most famous arenas in all of college basketball. The game was televised on ESPNU. Duke won the game by a score of 92–74.

On November 15, 2015, Siena traveled to Wisconsin to play the Badgers. Siena could not come back from a large first half deficit, as Wisconsin went on to win the game by a score of 92–65.

Siena finished the season with a 21–13 record and third-place finish (13–7) in the MAAC. The Saints had quality wins over NIT participants Hofstra, St. Bonaventure and Bucknell as well as against crosstown rival UAlbany. Siena also defeated eventual MAAC champion Iona on the road 81–78. However, Siena lost to Iona 81–70 to end their MAAC tournament run in the semifinals. The Saints were invited to the CBI tournament where they lost to eventual runner-up Morehead State 84–80.

On April 13, 2018, Patsos resigned after 5 years at Siena, finishing with a 77–92 overall record with the Saints and following an internal investigation regarding financial troubles and abusive conduct within the program.

=== Player benefits, coaching violations and sanctions ===
In 2020 Siena vacated 46 wins from 2015 to 2018 under Patsos, was fined $5,000 by the NCAA, and was forced to remove stats for 28 players, in addition to being placed on probation for three years, as well as a show-cause order being placed on Patsos, after the NCAA found that Patsos provided impermissible benefits, including payments to players, while he was head coach of Siena. According to the NCAA investigation findings players were paid to athletes at least twice each academic year in the general ranges of $60 to $80 and $100 or more, in one instance Patsos allegedly provided a player with a small amount of cash during a meeting in the weight room that took place during the 2017–2018 season. The NCAA also found that Patsos also allowed a noncoaching staff member to engage in unallowed coaching activity, which caused the program to exceed NCAA limits on countable coaches and provided false or misleading information to the NCAA during the investigation about his involvement in the player benefits violation.

=== Coach Christian ===
==== 2018–19 ====
On May 2, 2018, Siena announced the hiring of Jamion Christian as the 17th head coach in the program's history. He came to Siena after 6 seasons as head coach of his alma mater Mount St. Mary's University. In his first season as head coach the Saints -who were picked to finish last in the preseason coaches poll- were able to post an 11–7 conference record and finish tied for 2nd in the regular season. Freshman Jalen Pickett was MAAC Rookie of the Week a record 11 times and Christian's squad set a new team record for three point field goals made in one season. They would receive the 5th seed in the MAAC Tournament and defeated unanimous preseason favorite Rider in the quarterfinals before falling to Iona in the semifinals. Christian's first season is widely regarded as the best ever for a Siena head coach in their first season, especially when considering expectations. On March 21, 2019, Christian announced he would leave Siena for the vacant head coaching position at George Washington.

=== Coach Maciariello ===
==== 2019–20 ====
On March 25, 2019, Carmen Maciariello was named the 18th head coach in Siena men's basketball history.

In Maciariello's first season, he led the Saints to a 2020 MAAC championship. Siena won the regular season title, finishing the season on a 10-game winning steak. After defeating Manhattan in the conference quarterfinals, the MAAC cancelled the tournament as a result of the COVID-19 pandemic, and the Saints were awarded their first NCAA tournament berth since 2010.

==== 2020–21 ====
In the 2020-21 season, shortened by COVID, the Saints only played MAAC games as nonconference games against Drexel and Towson were cancelled. Siena started off the regular season 6-0 but finished 6-4 for an overall and conference record of 12-4, good enough to secure the 1 seed in the 2021 MAAC Tournament at Jim Whelan Boardwalk Hall in Atlantic City, NJ. The Saints lost a 55-52 game against 9 seed and eventual MAAC champion Iona. Manny Camper won the MAAC Player of the Year award, making it two years in a row with the award being given to a Siena player (Jalen Pickett in 2020).

==== 2021–2022 ====
In the offseason, Siena lost their top three scorers from the previous season - Manny Camper went to the G-League, Jalen Pickett transferred to Penn State, and Jordan King transferred to Eastern Tennessee State. The Saints only had 3 returning players, while the rest of the roster was filled with transfers and freshmen. When the regular season started, Siena lost their first four games and 6 out of their first 8, including a loss to #23 St. Bonaventure in the Franciscan Cup. As conference play started, the Saints picked it up and finished with a 12-8 conference record which included impressive wins over MAAC regular season champions Iona at home and a sweep of eventual MAAC Tournament champions and Elite Eight appearers St. Peters. Siena earned the 3 seed in the 2022 MAAC Tournament but they fell 77-71 in the quarterfinals to 11 seed Quinnipiac. Siena ended the 2021-22 season with an overall record of 15-14.

==== 2022–23 ====
Siena started off the 2022-23 season with wins at Holy Cross and over UAlbany in the return of the Albany Cup in a game where they trailed by nearly 20 points at the start of the second half. On November 24, Siena defeated Florida State 80-63 in the quarterfinals of the ESPN Events Invitational. The day after, they fell 62-74 to Ole Miss but bounced back to beat Seton Hall 60-55 in the 3rd place game. Later in the season, Siena defeated St. Bonaventure 76-70 to regain control of the Franciscan Cup. Siena started conference play 9-2 including a 70-53 victory over eventual MAAC Champions Iona at MVP Arena, but the Saints lost 7 out of their last 9 and their last 5 games to finish with a conference record of 11-9, which was tied for 3rd in the MAAC (4 seed in the tournament due to tiebreaker). Siena fell in the MAAC quarterfinals for the 3rd year in a row with a 65-71 loss to 5 seed Niagara. Siena players Michael Eley (Rookie of the Year), Jackson Stormo (All-MAAC 2nd Team), and Javian McCollum (All-MAAC 3rd Team) received awards from the MAAC.

==== 2023–24 ====
Siena went 4-28 the worst season the Saints have had in program history.

Siena fired Maciariello after 5 seasons as head coach.

=== Coach McNamara ===
==== 2024-25 ====
Gerry McNamara was hired as the 19th head coach in Siena basketball history on March 29, 2024.

In his first season Siena had a ten win improvement finishing 14-18 defeating teams that would eventually reach the NCAA tournament such as Bryant, American and Mount St. Mary’s.

==== 2025-26 ====
In his second season he led Siena to a 23-11 record and a third place finish in the MAAC. Sophomore guard Gavin Doty made first team all-MAAC and senior guard Justice Shoats made the second team. Freshman Francis Folefac made the all-rookie team.

Siena won the MAAC tournament championship for their first NCAA tournament berth in 16 years beating Merrimack 64-54 in the MAAC championship game. In the 2026 NCAA Division I men's basketball tournament, Siena lost in the first round to Duke 71-65.

== Retired numbers ==
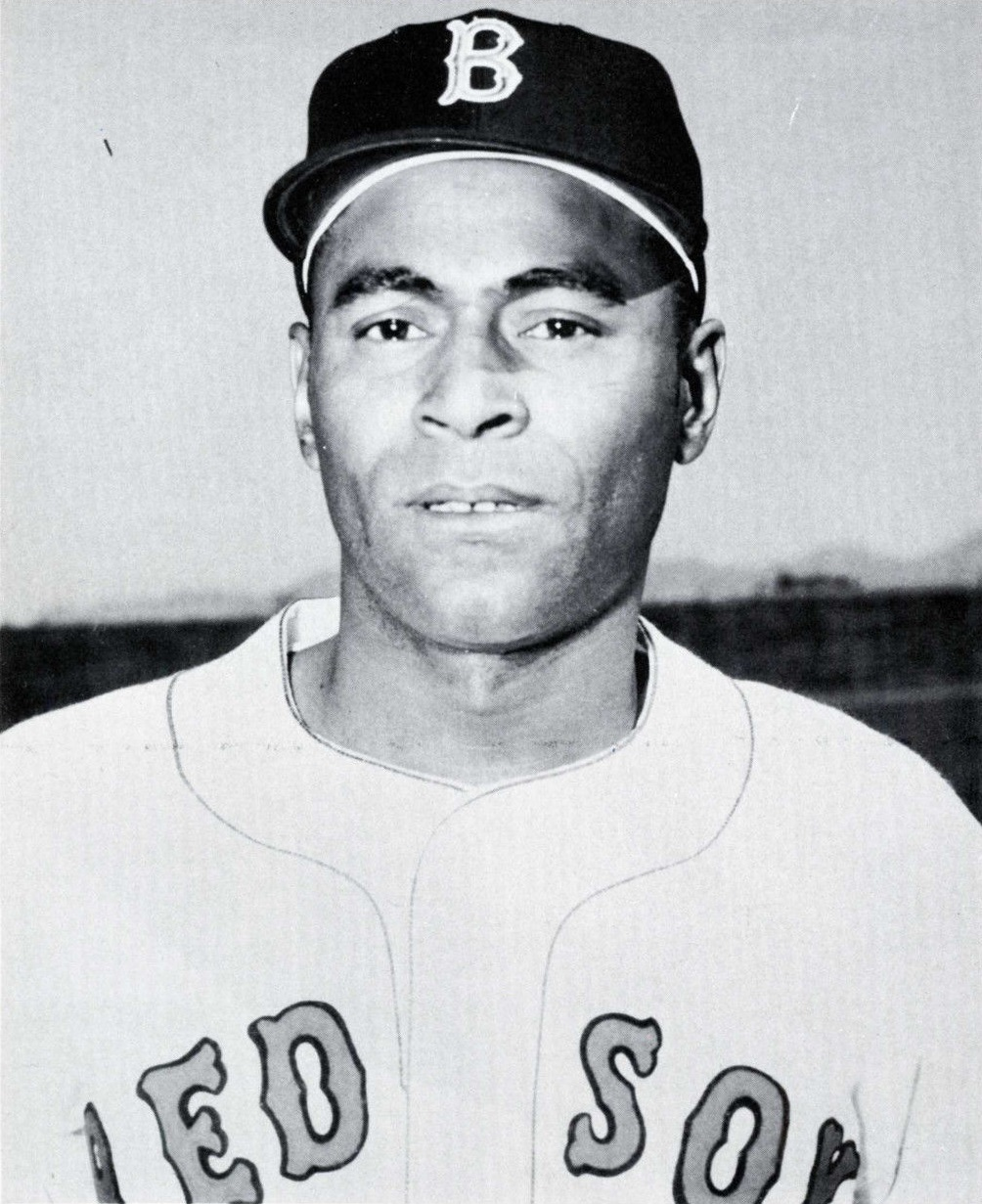
Billy Harrell has his #10 retired by Siena

Siena Saints retired numbers
No.	Player	Pos.	Tenure	No. ret.	Ref.
4	Marc Brown	PG	1987–91	2010	
10	Billy Harrell (Note: He was also a notable baseball player for Siena.)		1949–52		
41	Kenny Hasbrouck	PG	2005–09		
50	Fred Shear	F	1969–73	2012	

== MAAC Player of Year winners ==
- 1991: Marc Brown
- 1994: Doremus Bennerman
- 2009: Kenny Hasbrouck
- 2010: Alex Franklin
- 2011: Ryan Rossiter
- 2020: Jalen Pickett
- 2021: Manny Camper

== Siena NBA players ==
- Kenny Hasbrouck, Miami Heat (2010)
- Edwin Ubiles, Washington Wizards (2012)
- Jalen Pickett, Denver Nuggets (2023- )

== Siena players in international leagues ==
- Jackson Stormo (born 1999), Hapoel Haifa in the Israeli Basketball Premier League

== Top 15 all-time leading scorers ==
- Marc Brown (2,284)
- Doremus Bennerman (2,109)
- Edwin Ubiles (1,939)
- Kenny Hasbrouck (1,917)
- Alex Franklin (1,730)
- Marcus Faison (1,697)
- Jeff Robinson (1,657)
- Dwayne Archbold (1,644)
- Michael Haddix (1,594)
- Marquis Wright (1,546)
- Brett Bisping (1,528)
- Rob Poole (1,493)
- Ryan Rossiter (1,457)
- Eric Banks (1,432)
- Doug Poetzsch (1,398)

== Postseason ==
=== NCAA Division I ===
The Saints have appeared in seven NCAA Tournaments. Their combined record is 4–7. The Saints also qualified for the 2020 tournament, however it was cancelled due to the COVID-19 Pandemic.

Year	Seed	Round	Opponent	Result
1989	#14	First round Second round	#3 Stanford #11 Minnesota	W 80–78; L 67–80
1999	#13	First round	#4 Arkansas	L 80–94
2002	#16	Opening Round; First round	#16 Alcorn State #1 Maryland	W 81–77; L 70–85
2008	#13	First round Second round	#4 Vanderbilt #12 Villanova	W 83–62; L 72–84
2009	#9	First round Second round	#8 Ohio State #1 Louisville	W 74–72^{2OT} L 72–79
2010	#13	First round	#4 Purdue	L 64–72
2026	#16	First round	#1 Duke	L 65–71

=== NCAA Division II ===
The Saints appeared in the NCAA Division II Tournament once. Their combined record was 2–1.

Year	Round	Opponent	Result
1974	Round of 44; Regional Semifinals; Regional Third Place	New Jersey City; Hartwick; Potsdam State	W 87–64; L 72–81; W 82–74

=== NIT results ===
The Saints have appeared in five National Invitation Tournaments (NIT). Their combined record is 9–5.

Year	Round	Opponent	Result
1988	First round	Boston College	L 65–73
1991	First round Second round Quarterfinals	Fairleigh Dickinson; South Carolina; Massachusetts	W 90–85; W 63–58; L 80–82
1994	First round Second round Quarterfinals; Semifinals; 3rd Place Game	Georgia Tech; Tulane; Bradley; Villanova; Kansas State	W 76–68; W 89–79; W 75–62; L 58–66; W 92–79
2000	First round Quarterfinals	Massachusetts; Penn State	W 66–65; L 103–105
2003	Opening Round; First round Second round	Villanova; Western Michigan; UAB	W 74–59; W 68–62; L 71–80

=== CBI results ===
The Saints have appeared in two College Basketball Invitationals (CBI). Their record is 5–2 winning the 2014 CBI Championship 2 games to 1 over Fresno State.

Year	Round	Opponent	Result
2014	First round Quarterfinals; Semifinals; Finals Game 1 Finals Game 2 Finals Game 3	Stony Brook; Penn State; Illinois State; Fresno State; Fresno State; Fresno State	W 66–55; W 54–52; W 61–49; W 61–57; L 75–89; W 81–69
2016	First round	Morehead State	L 80–84

== Season-by-season results (Division I only) ==
Year	Coach	Record
1976–77	Bill Kirsch	9–15
1977–78	Bill Kirsch	13–10
1978–79	Bill Kirsch	14–12
1979–80	Bill Kirsch	14–14
1980–81	Bill Kirsch	17–10
1981–82	Bill Kirsch	15–13
1982–83	John Griffin	12–16
1983–84	John Griffin	15–13
1984–85	John Griffin	22–7
1985–86	John Griffin	21–8
1986–87	Mike Deane	17–12
1987–88	Mike Deane	23–6
1988–89	Mike Deane	25–5
1989–90	Mike Deane	16–13
1990–91	Mike Deane	25–10
1991–92	Mike Deane	19–10
1992–93	Mike Deane	16–13
1993–94	Mike Deane	25–8
1994–95	Bob Beyer	8–19
1995–96	Bob Beyer	5–22
1996–97	Bob Beyer	9–18
1997–98	Paul Hewitt	17–12
1998–99	Paul Hewitt	25–6
1999–2000	Paul Hewitt	24–9
2000–01	Louis Orr	20–11
2001–02	Rob Lanier	17–19
2002–03	Rob Lanier	21–11
2003–04	Rob Lanier	14–16
2004–05	Rob Lanier	6–24
2005–06	Fran McCaffery	15–13
2006–07	Fran McCaffery	20–12
2007–08	Fran McCaffery	23–11
2008–09	Fran McCaffery	27–8
2009–10	Fran McCaffery	27–7
2010–11	Mitch Buonaguro	13–18
2011–12	Mitch Buonaguro	14–17
2012–13	Mitch Buonaguro	8–24
2013–14	Jimmy Patsos	20–18
2014–15	Jimmy Patsos	11–20
2015–16	Jimmy Patsos	21–13
2016–17	Jimmy Patsos	17–17
2017–18	Jimmy Patsos	8–24
2018–19	Jamion Christian	17–16
2019–20	Carmen Maciariello	20–10
2020–21	Carmen Maciariello	12–5
2021–22	Carmen Maciariello	15–14
2022–23	Carmen Maciariello	17-15
2023-24	Carmen Maciariello	4-28
2024-25	Gerry McNamara	14-18
2025-26	Gerry McNamara	23-12

== See also ==
Rivalry with Le Moyne
