= 2025–26 Mid-American Conference men's basketball season =

- League: NCAA Division I
- Sport: Basketball
- Teams: 13

Regular season
- Champions: Miami
- Runners-up: Akron
- Season MVP: Peter Suder

Tournament
- Venue: Rocket Arena, Cleveland, Ohio
- Champions: Akron
- Runners-up: Toledo

Mid-American men's basketball seasons
- ← 2024–25 2026–27 →

2025–26 Mid-American Conference men's basketball standings
	Conf.				Overall
Team	W		L	PCT	W		L	PCT
Miami (OH)	18	–	0	1.000	32	–	2	.941
Akron †	17	–	1	.944	29	–	6	.829
Kent State	14	–	4	.778	24	–	10	.706
Toledo	11	–	7	.611	19	–	15	.559
Bowling Green	9	–	9	.500	18	–	14	.563
Ohio	9	–	9	.500	15	–	17	.469
Buffalo	7	–	11	.389	17	–	15	.531
UMass	7	–	11	.389	17	–	16	.515
Ball State	7	–	11	.389	12	–	19	.387
Central Michigan	6	–	12	.333	10	–	21	.323
Western Michigan	4	–	14	.222	10	–	21	.323
Northern Illinois	4	–	14	.222	9	–	21	.300
Eastern Michigan	4	–	14	.222	10	–	21	.323
† 2026 MAC tournament winner

The 2025–26 Mid-American Conference men's basketball season began with practices in October 2025, followed by the start of the 2025–26 NCAA Division I men's basketball season in November. Conference play will begin in December 2025 and conclude in March 2026. The 2026 MAC tournament was held at Rocket Arena in Cleveland, Ohio for the 27th consecutive season. The conference saw its first change in membership since 2005 with the addition of UMass It will also be the last MAC season for Northern Illinois, which will rejoin the Horizon League in 2026 after a nearly 30-year absence.

Miami won the regular season championship with an 18–0 record. They became the first MAC team to complete a perfect regular season with a 31–0 overall record. Miami's Peter Suder and Travis Steele won Player of the Year and Coach of the Year respectively.

Eighth seed UMass upset 20th ranked Miami in the quarterfinals of the MAC tournament. Second seeded Akron defeated Buffalo, Kent State, and Toledo to win their third straight MAC tournament title to advance to the 2026 NCAA tournament. Tavari Johnson of Akron was named tournament MVP.

Miami received at at-large bid to the NCAA tournament field and were placed the in First Four with an 11 seed against SMU. Miami joined Akron in the round of 64 with a 89–79 win. Akron lost to Texas Tech in the first round. Miami lost their round of 64 game to Tennessee Kent State lost to Illinois State in the first round of the NIT.

== Head coaches ==
=== Coaching changes ===
==== Central Michigan ====
After four seasons and a 49–75 overall record, Central Michigan fired Tony Barbee on April 3, 2025. On Monday, April 14, 2025, Central Michigan named Andy Bronkema the new head coach.

=== Coaches ===
Team	Head coach	Previous job	Years at school	Overall record	School record	MAC record	MAC titles	MAC Tournament titles	NCAA tournaments	NCAA Final Fours	NCAA Championships
Akron	John Groce	Illinois	9	348–219 (.614)	168–88 (.656)	99–49 (.669)	2	3	3	0	0
Ball State	Michael Lewis	UCLA (Asst.)	4	49–45 (.521)	49–45 (.521)	25–29 (.463)	0	0	0	0	0
Bowling Green	Todd Simon	Southern Utah	3	162–149 (.521)	34–32 (.515)	18–18 (.500)	0	0	0	0	0
Buffalo	George Halcovage	Villanova (Assoc. HC)	3	13–49 (.210)	13–49 (.210)	6–30 (.167)	0	0	0	0	0
Central Michigan	Andy Bronkema	Ferris State	1	256–93 (.734)	0–0 (–)	0–0 (–)	0	0	0	0	0
Eastern Michigan	Stan Heath	Lakeland Magic	5	255–284 (.473)	47–78 (.376)	25–49 (.338)	0	0	0	0	0
Kent State	Rob Senderoff	Kent State (Asst.)	15	288–176 (.621)	288–176 (.621)	149–101 (.596)	1	2	2	0	0
Miami	Travis Steele	Xavier	4	118–96 (.551)	52–46 (.531)	29–25 (.537)	0	0	0	0	0
Northern Illinois	Rashon Burno	Arizona State (Asst.)	5	39–85 (.315)	39–85 (.315)	22–47 (.319)	0	0	0	0	0
Ohio	Jeff Boals	Stony Brook	7	169–118 (.589)	114–76 (.600)	64–43 (.598)	0	1	1	0	0
Toledo	Tod Kowalczyk	Green Bay	16	432–308 (.584)	296–196 (.602)	166–101 (.622)	5	0	0	0	0
UMass	Frank Martin	South Carolina	4	335–248 (.575)	47–47 (.500)	0–0 (–)	0	0	0	0	0
Western Michigan	Dwayne Stephens	Michigan State (Assoc. HC)	4	32–63 (.337)	32–63 (.337)	22–32 (.407)	0	0	0	0	0

Notes:

- Appearances, titles, etc. are from time with current school only.
- Years at school includes 2025–26 season.
- MAC records are from time at current school only.
- All records are through the beginning of the season.

Source -

== Preseason ==
The MAC Men’s & Women’s Basketball Tip-Off was held on Tuesday, October 21, 2025. Each team had their head coach and a student athlete from both the men's and women's basketball team for interviews.

MAC Men's Basketball Preview Coaches & Student-Athletes

- Akron: Head Coach John Groce & Tavari Johnson (Senior, Guard)
- Ball State: Head Coach Michael Lewis & Juwan Maxey (Senior, Guard)
- Bowling Green: Head Coach Todd Simon & Javontae Campbell (Senior, Guard)
- Buffalo: Head Coach George Halcovage III & Angelo Brizzi (Grad., Guard)
- Central Michigan: Head Coach Andy Bronkema & Phat Phat Brooks (Sophomore, Guard)
- Eastern Michigan: Head Coach Stan Heath & Mak Manciel (Senior, Guard)
- Kent State: Head Coach Rob Senderoff & Delrecco Gillespie (Senior, Forward)
- Miami: Head Coach Travis Steele & Peter Suder (Senior, Guard)
- Northern Illinois: Head Coach Rashon Burno & Dylan Ducommun (Freshman, Guard)
- Ohio: Head Coach Jeff Boals & Jackson Paveletzke (Senior, Guard)
- Toledo: Head Coach Tod Kowalczyk & Sonny Wilson (Junior, Guard)
- Western Michigan: Head Coach Dwayne Stephens & Max Burton (R-Junior, Forward)

=== Preseason men's basketball coaches poll ===
Men's Basketball Preseason Poll
Place	Team	Points	First place votes
1.	Akron	143	11
2.	Miami	133	2
3.	Kent State	122	--
4.	Ohio	108	--
5.	UMass	98	--
6.	Toledo	95	--
7.	Bowling Green	73	--
8.	Ball State	62	--
9.	Eastern Michigan	52	--
10.	Western Michigan	46	--
11.	Buffalo	37	--
12.	Central Michigan	31	--
13.	Northern Illinois	14	--

MAC Tournament Champions:Akron (8), Miami (2), Kent State (1), Ohio (1), UMass (1)

=== MAC Preseason All-Conference ===
Honor	Recipient
Preseason All-MAC First Team	Tavari Johnson, Senior, Guard, Akron
Preseason All-MAC First Team	Javontae Campbell, Senior, Guard, Bowling Green
Preseason All-MAC First Team	Delrecco Gillespie, Senior, Forward, Kent State
Preseason All-MAC First Team	Peter Suder, Senior, Guard, Miami
Preseason All-MAC First Team	Jackson Paveletzke, Senior, Guard, Ohio
Preseason All-MAC Second Team	Evan Mahaffey, Senior, Wing, Akron
Preseason All-MAC Second Team	Shammah Scott, Graduate Student, Guard, Akron
Preseason All-MAC Second Team	Daniel Hankins-Sanford, Senior, Forward, UMass
Preseason All-MAC Second Team	Javan Simmons, Redshirt Junior, Forward, Ohio
Preseason All-MAC Second Team	Sonny Wilson, Junior, Guard, Toledo

== Regular season ==
=== Rankings ===
		Pre	Wk 2	Wk 3	Wk 4	Wk 5	Wk 6	Wk 7	Wk 8	Wk 9	Wk 10	Wk 11	Wk 12	Wk 13	Wk 14	Wk 15	Wk 16	Wk 17	Wk 18	Wk 19	Final
Akron	AP																				
Akron	C																				
Ball State	AP																				
Ball State	C																				
Bowling Green	AP																				
Bowling Green	C																				
Buffalo	AP				RV	RV															
Buffalo	C																				
Central Michigan	AP																				
Central Michigan	C																				
Eastern Michigan	AP																				
Eastern Michigan	C																				
Kent State	AP																				
Kent State	C																				
Miami	AP						RV	RV	RV	RV	RV	RV	25	24	23	23	22	21	19	RV	RV
Miami	C									RV	RV	RV	RV	25	24	24	23	25	20	RV	RV
Northern Illinois	AP																				
Northern Illinois	C																				
Ohio	AP																				
Ohio	C																				
Toledo	AP																				
Toledo	C																				
UMass	AP																				
UMass	C																				
Western Michigan	AP																				
Western Michigan	C																				

Legend
	Improvement in ranking
	Drop in ranking
	Not ranked previous week
	No change in ranking from previous week
RV	Received votes but were not ranked in Top 25 of poll
т	Tied with team above or below also with this symbol

=== Conference matrix ===
	Akron	Ball State	Bowling Green	Buffalo	Central Michigan	Eastern Michigan	Kent State	Miami (OH)	Northern Illinois	Ohio	Toledo	UMass	Western Michigan
vs. Akron	—	0–2	0–1	0–2	0–2	0–2	0–2	1–0	0–1	0–1	0–1	0–1	0–2
vs. Ball State	2–0	—	1–0	2–0	0–2	1–0	1–0	1–0	0–2	1–1	1–0	1–1	0–1
vs. Bowling Green	1–0	0–1	—	1–0	1–0	0–2	2–0	2–0	0–1	0–1	1–1	0–2	1–1
vs. Buffalo	2–0	0–2	0–1	—	1–0	0–1	1–0	2–0	1–1	2–0	1–0	1–1	0–1
vs. Central Michigan	2–0	2–0	0–1	0–1	—	1–1	1–1	1–0	1–1	1–0	1–0	1–0	1–1
vs. Eastern Michigan	2–0	0–1	2–0	1–0	1–1	—	2–0	1–0	0–1	1–0	1–0	1–1	2–0
vs. Kent State	2–0	0–1	0–2	0–1	1–1	0–2	—	1–0	0–2	0–1	0–2	0–1	0–1
vs. Miami (OH)	0–1	0–1	0–2	0–2	0–1	0–1	0–1	—	0–1	0–2	0–2	0–2	0–2
vs. Northern Illinois	1–0	2–0	1–0	1–1	1–1	1–0	2–0	1–0	—	2–0	2–0	0–1	0–1
vs. Ohio	1–0	1–1	1–0	0–2	0–1	0–1	1–0	2–0	0–2	—	2–0	1–1	0–1
vs. Toledo	1–0	0–1	1–1	0–1	0–1	0–1	2–0	2–0	0–2	0–2	—	1–0	0–2
vs. UMass	1–0	1–1	2–0	1–1	0–1	1–1	1–0	2–0	1–0	1–1	0–1	—	0–1
vs. Western Michigan	2–0	1–0	1–1	1–0	1–1	0–2	1–0	2–0	1–0	1–0	2–0	1–0	—
Total	17–1	7–11	9–9	7–11	6–12	4–14	14–4	18–0	4–14	9–9	11–7	7–11	4–14

=== MAC–SBC Challenge ===
The third installment of the MAC–SBC Challenge scheduling alliance was announced on July 1, 2025. All 13 men's and women's Mid-American Conference teams will play 13 men's and women's teams in the Sun Belt Conference.

MAC–SBC Challenge men's basketball
First round November 3, 2025
MAC (home)	Score	Score	SBC (away)
Akron	85	71	James Madison
Ball State	75	64	Louisiana
Bowling Green	83	48	Texas State
Buffalo	85	79	Southern Miss
Central Michigan	82	66	Appalachian State
Eastern Michigan	71	49	Georgia State
Kent State	97	103	Troy
Miami (OH)	87	72	Old Dominion
Northern Illinois	102	82	Louisiana Monroe
Ohio	85	89	Arkansas State
Toledo	74	76	South Alabama
UMass	72	78	Marshall
Western Michigan	76	71	Coastal Carolina
First round	9	4	Source

Second round February 7, 2026
MAC (away)	Score	Score	SBC (home)
Akron	69	79	Troy
Ball State	73	68	Louisiana-Monroe
Bowling Green	74	91	Arkansas State
Buffalo	69	81	South Alabama
Central Michigan	80	85	Louisiana
Eastern Michigan	60	65	Appalachian State
Kent State	65	66	Southern Mississippi
Miami (OH)	90	74	Marshall
Northern Illinois	75	74	Georgia State
Ohio	72	78	Old Dominion
Toledo	71	73	James Madison
UMass	91	94	Coastal Carolina
Western Michigan	61	77	Texas State
Second round	3	10	Source
Total wins	12	14	

== Postseason ==
=== Mid–American Tournament ===
Eighth seed UMass upset 20th ranked Miami in the quarterfinals of the MAC tournament. Second seeded Akron defeated Buffalo, Kent State, and Toledo to win their third straight MAC tournament title to advance to the 2026 NCAA tournament.

=== NCAA tournament ===
Miami received an at-large bid to the NCAA field and earned a spot in the round of 64 with a preliminary round win over SMU.

Seed	Region	School	First Four	First round	Second round	Sweet 16	Elite Eight	Final Four	Championship
11	Midwest	Miami (OH)	W 89–79 vs. (11) SMU	L 56–78 vs. (6) Tennessee	DNP				
12	Midwest	Akron	Bye	L 71–91 vs. (5) Texas Tech	DNP				
		W–L (%):	1–0 (1.000)	0–2 (.000)	0–0 (–)	0–0 (–)	0–0 (–)	0–0 (–)	0–0 (–)
Total: 1–2 (.333)

=== National Invitation tournament ===
Kent State accepted an NIT bid and lost to Illinois State in the first round.

School	First round	Second Round	Quarterfinal	Semifinal	Championship
Kent State	L 58–79 vs. (4) Illinois State	DNP			
W–L (%):	0–1 (.000)	0–0 (–)	0–0 (–)	0–0 (–)	0–0 (–) Total: 0–1 (.000)

== All-MAC awards ==
=== Mid-American men's basketball weekly awards ===
Week	Player(s) of the Week	School
Nov 10	Javontae Campbell; Morgan Safford	Bowling Green; Kent State
Nov 17	Delrecco Gillespie	Kent State
Nov 24	Daniel Freitag; Mohammad Habhab	Buffalo; Eastern Michigan
Dec 1	Daniel Freitag (2)	Buffalo
Dec 8	Tavari Johnson; Javontae Campbell (2)	Akron; Bowling Green
Dec 15	Marcus Banks Jr.	UMass
Dec 22	Brant Byers	Miami
Dec 29	Ryan Sabol	Buffalo
Jan 5	Javontae Campbell (3)	Bowling Green
Jan 12	Jackson Paveletzke	Ohio
Jan 19	Delrecco Gillespie (2)	Kent State
Jan 26	Amani Lyles	Akron
Feb 2	Tavari Johnson (2)	Akron
Feb 9	Marcus Banks Jr. (2)	UMass
Feb 16	Delrecco Gillespie (3)	Kent State
Feb 23	Tavari Johnson (3); Luke Skaljac	Akron; Miami
Mar 2	Shammah Scott	Akron
Mar 9		

=== Postseason awards ===
2026 Mid-American Men's Basketball Individual Awards
Award	Recipient(s)
Player of the Year	Peter Suder, Miami
Coach of the Year	Travis Steele, Miami
Defensive Player of the Year	Javontae Campbell, Bowling Green
Freshman of the Year	Leroy Blyden Jr., Toledo
Sixth Man Award	Shammah Scott, Akron

=== All-MAC Honors ===
2026 Mid-American Men's Basketball All-Conference Teams
First Team	Second Team	Third Team	Honorable Mention	All-Defensive	Freshman Team
Tavari Johnson, Akron; Amani Lyles, Akron; Javontae Campbell, Bowling Green; Delrecco Gillespie, Kent State; Peter Suder, Miami	Leonardo Bettiol, UMass; Brant Byers, Miami; Eian Elmer, Miami; Jackson Paveletzke, Ohio; Sonny Wilson, Toledo	Shammah Scott, Akron; Ryan Sabol, Buffalo; Marcus Banks Jr., UMass; Luke Skaljac, Miami; Leroy Blyden Jr., Toledo	Evan Mahaffey, Akron; Daniel Freitag, Buffalo; Morgan Safford, Kent State; Antwone Woolfolk, Miami; Javan Simmons, Toledo	Amani Lyles, Akron; Evan Mahaffey, Akron; Javontae Campbell, Bowling Green; Nathan Claerbaut, Central Michigan; Delrecco Gillespie, Kent State	Eric Mahaffey, Akron; Mohammad Habhab, Eastern Michigan; Quinn Woidke, Kent State; Danny Carbuccia, UMass; Leroy Blyden Jr., Toledo

== See also ==
2025–26 Mid-American Conference women's basketball season
