= 2025–26 Central Michigan Chippewas men's basketball team =

American college basketball season

2025–26 Central Michigan Chippewas men's basketball
- Conference: Mid-American Conference
- Record: 10–21 (6–12 MAC)
- Head coach: Andy Bronkema (1st season)
- Associate head coach: Brooks Miller (1st season)
- Assistant coaches: Jim Lake (1st season); Raymoan McAfee (1st season)
- Home arena: McGuirk Arena

2025–26 Mid-American Conference men's basketball standings
	Conf.				Overall
Team	W		L	PCT	W		L	PCT
Miami (OH)	18	–	0	1.000	32	–	2	.941
Akron †	17	–	1	.944	29	–	6	.829
Kent State	14	–	4	.778	24	–	10	.706
Toledo	11	–	7	.611	19	–	15	.559
Bowling Green	9	–	9	.500	18	–	14	.563
Ohio	9	–	9	.500	15	–	17	.469
Buffalo	7	–	11	.389	17	–	15	.531
UMass	7	–	11	.389	17	–	16	.515
Ball State	7	–	11	.389	12	–	19	.387
Central Michigan	6	–	12	.333	10	–	21	.323
Western Michigan	4	–	14	.222	10	–	21	.323
Northern Illinois	4	–	14	.222	9	–	21	.300
Eastern Michigan	4	–	14	.222	10	–	21	.323
† 2026 MAC tournament winner

The 2025–26 Central Michigan Chippewas men's basketball team represented Central Michigan University during the 2025–26 NCAA Division I men's basketball season. The Chippewas, led by first-year head coach Andy Bronkema, played their home games at McGuirk Arena in Mount Pleasant, Michigan as members of the Mid-American Conference. They finished the 2025–26 season 10–21, 6–12 in MAC play, to finish in 10th place. They failed to qualify for the MAC tournament.

== Previous season ==
The Chippewas finished the 2024–25 season 14–17, 7-11 in MAC play, to finish tied for ninth place out of the twelve teams competing. They did not qualify for the MAC men's basketball tournament

== Offseason ==
=== Departures ===
Departures
Name	Number	Pos.	Height	Weight	Year	Hometown	Reason for departure
Jakobi Heady	0	G/F	6'6"	200	Senior	Sauk Village, Illinois	Transferred to Bethune–Cookman
Shaedon Simpson	1	G	6'6"	185	RS Freshman	Toronto, Ontario	Transferred to Saint Peter's
Cayden Vasko	2	G	6'6"	190	Sophomore	Lowell, Indiana	Transferred to Wofford
Mohammad Habhab	3	F	6'9"	205	Freshman	Dearborn, Michigan	Transferred to Eastern Michigan
Kyler VanderJagt	4	G	6'4"	205	Junior	Grand Rapids, Michigan	Transferred to Toledo
Quentin Heady	5	F	6'6"	200	Sophomore	Sauk Village, Illinois	Transferred to Bethune–Cookman
Damarion Bonds	7	G	6'6"	180	Junior	Pontiac, Michigan	Transferred to Alabama State
Ryan Hatcher	9	G	6'2"	155	Freshman	Detroit, Michigan	
Trey Phillips	11	F	6'7"	205	Sophomore	Scottsdale, Arizona	Entered transfer portal
Hunter Harding	12	C	7'0"	245	Sophomore	Toronto, Ontario	Transferred to Indiana State
Bryan Ndjonga	13	F	6'9"	200	Sophomore	Yaoundé, Cameroon	Transferred to Canisius
Ugnius Jarusevicius	21	F	6'10"	220	Junior	Alytus, Lithuania	Transferred to Nebraska
Drew Barbee	22	G	6'3"	200	RS Freshman	Mount Pleasant, Michigan	Transferred to Incarnate Word
Gus Salem	23	G	6'2"	185	Freshman	Los Angeles, California	Entered transfer portal
Armani Mighty	26	C	6'10"	240	Junior	Toronto, Ontario	Transferred to Mercer
Anthony Pritchard	30	G	6'2"	185	Senior	Tulsa, Oklahoma	Graduated

=== Incoming transfers ===
Incoming transfers
Name	Number	Pos.	Height	Weight	Year	Hometown	Previous school
Jaxson Whitaker	3	G	6'4"	215	Sophomore	Muskegon, Michigan	Ferris State
Kareem Aburashed	4	C	6'10"	235	Senior	West Bloomfield, Michigan	Wayne State
Tamario Adley	5	G	6'1"	195	Senior	Detroit, Michigan	Wayne State
Phat Phat Brooks	10	G	6'2"	195	Sophomore	Grand Rapids, Michigan	Michigan
Kayden Nation	11	F	6'7"	225	Junior	Peoria, Illinois	Indian Hills CC
Keenan Garner	13	F	6'6"	220	Sophomore	Fishers, Indiana	IU Indy
Nick Mullen	21	F	6'10"	230	Senior	Chesterton, Indiana	IU South Bend
Will Ashford	22	G	6'5"	200	Sophomore	Aurora, Illinois	Purdue Northwest
Jorden Brooks	23	G	6'1"	185	Junior	Grand Rapids, Michigan	Ferris State
Rodney Johnson Jr.	24	F	6'5"	220	Senior	Bryan, Texas	Tennessee Tech
Nathan Claerbaut	32	C	7'0"	230	Senior	Zeeland, Michigan	Ferris State
Logan McIntire	33	G	6'5"	205	Senior	Ramsey, Indiana	Kentucky Wesleyan

=== Recruiting class ===
College recruiting
Name	Hometown	School	Height	Weight	Commit date
Uchenna Amene; G	Northville, Michigan	Detroit Catholic Central High School	6 ft 0 in (1.83 m)	180 lb (82 kg)	
Uchenna Amene; G	Recruit ratings: Scout: Rivals: 247Sports: On3: ESPN:				
Nsikan Usen; F	Milford, Michigan	Lakeland High School	6 ft 6 in (1.98 m)	200 lb (91 kg)	
Nsikan Usen; F	Recruit ratings: Scout: Rivals: 247Sports: On3: ESPN:				
Jalen Kampen; G	Parchment, Michigan	Parchment High School	6 ft 3 in (1.91 m)	175 lb (79 kg)	
Jalen Kampen; G	Recruit ratings: Scout: Rivals: 247Sports: On3: ESPN:				
Overall recruit ranking:
Note: In many cases, Scout, Rivals, 247Sports, On3, and ESPN may conflict in their listings of height and weight.; In these cases, the average was taken. ESPN grades are on a 100-point scale.; Sources: "2025 Team Ranking". Rivals.

== Preseason ==
=== Preseason rankings ===
MAC preseason poll
Predicted finish	Team	Votes (1st place)

=== Preseason All-MAC ===
Preseason All-MAC teams
Team	Player	Position	Year

== Roster ==
2025–26 Central Michigan Chippewas men's basketball team
Players
Coaches

Pos.	#	Name	Height	Weight	Year	Previous school	Hometown
G	0	Uchenna Amene	6 ft 0 in (1.83 m)	180 lb (82 kg)	Fr	Detroit Catholic Central High School	Northville, Michigan
F	1	Nsikan Usen	6 ft 6 in (1.98 m)	200 lb (91 kg)	Fr	Lakeland High School	Milford, Michigan
G	2	Jalen Kampen	6 ft 3 in (1.91 m)	175 lb (79 kg)	Fr	Parchment High School	Parchment, Michigan
G	3	Jaxson Whitaker	6 ft 4 in (1.93 m)	215 lb (98 kg)	So	Ferris State	Muskegon, Michigan
C	4	Kareem Aburashed	6 ft 10 in (2.08 m)	235 lb (107 kg)	Sr	Wayne State	West Bloomfield, Michigan
G	5	Tamario Adley	6 ft 1 in (1.85 m)	195 lb (88 kg)	Sr	Wayne State	Detroit, Michigan
G	10	Phat Phat Brooks	6 ft 2 in (1.88 m)	195 lb (88 kg)	So	Michigan	Grand Rapids, Michigan
F	11	Kayden Nation	6 ft 7 in (2.01 m)	225 lb (102 kg)	Jr	Indian Hills Community College	Peoria, Illinois
F	13	Keenan Garner	6 ft 6 in (1.98 m)	220 lb (100 kg)	So	IU Indy	Fishers, Indiana
F	21	Nick Mullen	6 ft 10 in (2.08 m)	230 lb (104 kg)	Sr	IU South Bend	Chesterton, Indiana
G	22	Will Ashford	6 ft 5 in (1.96 m)	200 lb (91 kg)	So	Purdue Northwest	Aurora, Illinois
G	23	Jorden Brooks	6 ft 1 in (1.85 m)	185 lb (84 kg)	Jr	Ferris State	Grand Rapids, Michigan
F	24	Rodney Johnson Jr.	6 ft 5 in (1.96 m)	220 lb (100 kg)	Sr	Tennessee Tech	Bryan, Texas
C	32	Nathan Claerbaut	7 ft 0 in (2.13 m)	230 lb (104 kg)	Sr	Ferris State	Zeeland, Michigan
G	33	Logan McIntire	6 ft 5 in (1.96 m)	205 lb (93 kg)	Sr	Kentucky Wesleyan	Ramsey, Indiana

Head coach

- Andy Bronkema (Cornerstone)

Assistant coach(es)

- Brooks Miller (Hillsdale)
- Jim Lake (Central Michigan)
- Raymoan McAfee (Ferris State)

Legend

- (C) Team captain
- (S) Suspended
- (I) Ineligible
- (W) Walk-on
- Injured
- Current redshirt

Roster
Last update: October 6, 2025

== Schedule and results ==
Date time, TV	Rank^{#}	Opponent^{#}	Result	Record	High points	High rebounds	High assists	Site (attendance) city, state
Exhibition
October 24, 2025*; 7:00 p.m.		Saginaw Valley State	W 77–56		16 – Whitaker	8 – Garner	3 – Ashford	McGuirk Arena (1,121); Mount Pleasant, MI
Regular season
November 3, 2025*; 7:00 p.m., ESPN+		Appalachian State; MAC-SBC Challenge	W 82–66	1–0	22 – Adley	7 – Tied	3 – Tied	McGuirk Arena (1,587); Mount Pleasant, MI
November 8, 2025*; 8:00 p.m., ESPN+		at Bradley	L 54–85	1–1	12 – Garner	8 – Garner	2 – Adley	Carver Arena (5,814); Peoria, IL
November 13, 2025*; 11:00 a.m., YouTube		vs. South Alabama; Showdown in St. Pete	L 64–66	1–2	21 – McIntire	14 – Claerbaut	6 – Brooks	McArthur Center (148); St. Petersburg, FL
November 14, 2025*; 11:00 a.m., YouTube		vs. Coppin State; Showdown in St. Pete	W 82–59	2–2	20 – Claerbaut	11 – Claerbaut	4 – Brooks	McArthur Center (142); St. Petersburg, FL
November 20, 2025*; 7:00 p.m., ESPN+		Northern Kentucky	L 66–90	2–3	12 – Mullen	6 – Claerbaut	5 – Tied	McGuirk Arena (1,402); Mount Pleasant, MI
November 22, 2025*; 2:00 p.m., TruTV		at Marquette	L 71–85	2–4	14 – Claerbaut	8 – Adley	4 – Brooks	Fiserv Forum (14,034); Milwaukee, WI
November 25, 2025*; 7:00 p.m., ESPN+		Adrian	W 112–67	3–4	18 – Johnson Jr.	8 – Adley	7 – Adley	McGuirk Arena (1,086); Mount Pleasant, MI
December 2, 2025*; 8:00 p.m., Marquee/ESPN+		at Loyola Chicago	L 72–83	3–5	21 – Johnson Jr.	6 – Tied	6 – Brooks	Joseph J. Gentile Arena (1,726); Chicago, IL
December 7, 2025*; 3:00 p.m., ESPN+		at Saint Louis	L 65–107	3–6	19 – Adley	7 – Claerbaut	4 – Adley	Chaifetz Arena (4,446); Saint Louis, MO
December 13, 2025*; 12:00 p.m., SNY/FloCollege		at Stony Brook	L 55–78	3–7	14 – Mullen	4 – Whitaker	3 – Tied	Stony Brook Arena (1,314); Stony Brook, NY
December 17, 2025*; 7:00 p.m., ESPN+		Olivet	W 85–65	4–7	31 – Claerbaut	12 – Claerbaut	7 – Adley	McGuirk Arena (1,012); Mount Pleasant, MI
December 20, 2025; 3:00 p.m., ESPN+		at Northern Illinois	L 73–74	4–8 (0–1)	18 – Tied	7 – Tied	7 – Brooks	Convocation Center (1,311); DeKalb, IL
December 22, 2025*; 8:00 p.m., BTN		at Wisconsin	L 61–88	4–9	13 – Adley	5 – Mullen	6 – Adley	Kohl Center (14,106); Madison, WI
December 30, 2025; 3:00 p.m., ESPN+		Ohio	L 64–80	4–10 (0–2)	19 – Adley	7 – Tied	4 – Claerbaut	McGuirk Arena (1,358); Mount Pleasant, MI
January 3, 2026; 3:00 p.m., ESPN+		Toledo	L 75–78	4–11 (0–3)	17 – Brooks	6 – Mullen	4 – Adley	McGuirk Arena (1,342); Mount Pleasant, MI
January 6, 2026; 7:00 p.m., ESPN+		at Akron	L 69–82	4–12 (0–4)	20 – Adley	6 – Adley	3 – Brooks	James A. Rhodes Arena (1,623); Akron, OH
January 10, 2025; 3:00 p.m., ESPN+		Kent State	W 87–85	5–12 (1–4)	20 – Brooks	8 – Tied	4 – Brooks	McGuirk Arena (2,022); Mount Pleasant, MI
January 13, 2026; 7:00 p.m., ESPN+		at Miami (OH)	L 61–100	5–13 (1–5)	16 – Claerbaut	8 – Garner	4 – Brooks	Millett Hall (2,021); Oxford, OH
January 20, 2026; 7:00 p.m., ESPN+		Ball State	L 67–68	5–14 (1–6)	21 – McIntire	8 – Tied	6 – Adley	McGuirk Arena (2,202); Mount Pleasant, MI
January 24, 2026; 6:00 p.m., ESPN+		at Western Michigan	L 65–77	5–15 (1–7)	17 – Claerbaut	12 – Garner	5 – Adley	University Arena (4,776); Kalamazoo, MI
January 27, 2026; 7:00 p.m., ESPN+		Eastern Michigan	W 100–65	6–15 (2–7)	19 – McIntire	9 – Garner	6 – Adley	McGuirk Arena (1,886); Mount Pleasant, MI
January 31, 2026; 7:00 p.m., ESPN+		Bowling Green	W 62–59	7–15 (3–7)	18 – Garner	14 – Garner	6 – Brooks	McGuirk Arena (5,352); Mount Pleasant, MI
February 3, 2026; 7:00 p.m., ESPN+		at UMass	L 89–95	7–16 (3–8)	40 – McIntire	6 – Brooks	11 – Brooks	Mullins Center (2,243); Amherst, MA
February 7, 2026*; 4:00 p.m., ESPN+		at Louisiana; MAC-SBC Challenge	L 80–85	7–17	21 – Adley	5 – Brooks	3 – Adley	Cajundome (3,148); Lafayette, LA
February 14, 2026; 5:00 p.m., ESPN+		Northern Illinois	W 88–46	8–17 (4–8)	19 – Whitaker	11 – Garner	6 – Adley	McGuirk Arena (1,662); Mount Pleasant, MI
February 17, 2026; 6:30 p.m., ESPN+		at Eastern Michigan	L 54–66	8–18 (4–9)	17 – Adley	7 – Claerbaut	2 – Tied	George Gervin GameAbove Center (1,517); Ypsilanti, MI
February 21, 2026; 5:00 p.m., ESPN+		Western Michigan	W 83–70	9–18 (5–9)	25 – Adley	6 – Adley	5 – Brooks	McGuirk Arena (2,888); Mount Pleasant, MI
February 24, 2026; 7:00 p.m., ESPN+		at Kent State	L 81–83	9–19 (5–10)	20 – Brooks	6 – Adley	7 – Brooks	MAC Center (2,124); Kent, OH
February 28, 2026; 2:00 p.m., ESPN+		at Buffalo	W 75–70	10–19 (6–10)	21 – Adley	10 – Garner	8 – Brooks	Alumni Arena (2,499); Amherst, NY
March 3, 2026; 7:00 p.m., ESPN+		Akron	L 64–77	10–20 (6–11)	15 – McIntire	9 – Adley	5 – Adley	McGuirk Arena (1,901); Mount Pleasant, MI
March 6, 2026; 7:00 p.m., ESPN+		at Ball State	L 69–85	10–21 (6–12)	17 – Brooks	8 – Garner	6 – Adley	Worthen Arena (2,815); Muncie, IN
*Non-conference game. ^{#}Rankings from AP Poll. (#) Tournament seedings in parentheses. All times are in Eastern.
