= 2025–26 Akron Zips men's basketball team =

American college basketball season

2025–26 Akron Zips men's basketball

MAC tournament champions

NCAA tournament, First round
- Conference: Mid-American Conference
- Record: 29–6 (17–1 MAC)
- Head coach: John Groce (9th season)
- Associate head coach: Dustin Ford (9th season)
- Assistant coaches: Robby Pridgen (9th season); Mike Allen (2nd season); Terry Weigand (1st season); Devan Morrow (2nd season)
- Home arena: James A. Rhodes Arena

2025–26 Mid-American Conference men's basketball standings
	Conf.				Overall
Team	W		L	PCT	W		L	PCT
Miami (OH)	18	–	0	1.000	32	–	2	.941
Akron †	17	–	1	.944	29	–	6	.829
Kent State	14	–	4	.778	24	–	10	.706
Toledo	11	–	7	.611	19	–	15	.559
Bowling Green	9	–	9	.500	18	–	14	.563
Ohio	9	–	9	.500	15	–	17	.469
Buffalo	7	–	11	.389	17	–	15	.531
UMass	7	–	11	.389	17	–	16	.515
Ball State	7	–	11	.389	12	–	19	.387
Central Michigan	6	–	12	.333	10	–	21	.323
Western Michigan	4	–	14	.222	10	–	21	.323
Northern Illinois	4	–	14	.222	9	–	21	.300
Eastern Michigan	4	–	14	.222	10	–	21	.323
† 2026 MAC tournament winner

The 2025–26 Akron Zips men's basketball team represented the University of Akron during the 2025–26 NCAA Division I men's basketball season. The Zips, led by ninth-year head coach John Groce, played their home games at the James A. Rhodes Arena in Akron, Ohio as members of the Mid-American Conference.

Akron finished the regular season 26–5. Their 17–1 record MAC play was good for second place. Their only conference loss was to Miami who finished the regular season unbeaten and ranked 20th. Their 34–2 conference record over two seasons set set a new mark for best record over a two year span. Eighth seed UMass upset Miami in the quarterfinals of the MAC tournament. Akron capitalized and defeated Buffalo, Kent State and Toledo on consecutive nights in Rocket Arena to win the tournament and earn a spot in the 2026 NCAA tournament. This was Akron's third straight MAC tournament championship and their 7th overall. They lost to Texas Tech in the first round.

The team ended the season with a school record setting 31 consecutive James A. Rhodes Arena home game win streak, surpassing the 30-game streak established by the 2014–15 (2 wins), 2015–16 (15) and 2016–17 teams (13). Conference rival Miami also ended its season with an active 31-game home win streak.

== Previous season ==
The Zips won the MAC with a 17–1 record and the MAC tournament As a 13 seed, they lost their first round matchup in the NCAA tournament to Arizona.

== Offseason ==
=== Departures ===
Departures
Name	Number	Pos.	Height	Weight	Year	Hometown	Reason for departure
Isaiah Gray	13	G	6'3"	220	Senior	Brooklyn, New York	Graduated
Seth Wilson	14	G	6'2"	220	Senior	Lorain, Ohio	Graduated
Evan Wilson	20	G	6'2"	195	Senior	Noblesville, Indiana	Graduated
Josiah Harris	22	G/F	6'7"	210	Junior	Canton, Ohio	Transferred to Cleveland State
James Okonkwo	32	F	6'8"	240	Senior	Maidenhead, England	Transferred to Utah
Nate Johnson	34	G	6'3"	205	Junior	Liberty Township, Ohio	Transferred to Kansas State

=== Incoming transfers ===
Incoming transfers
Name	Number	Pos.	Height	Weight	Year	Hometown	Previous school
Cody Head	9	SG	6'3"	170	Junior	Cleveland, Ohio	Arkansas State
Evan Mahaffey	12	SF	6'6"	200	Senior	Cincinnati, Ohio	Ohio State

=== Recruiting class ===
College recruiting information
Name	Hometown	School	Height	Weight	Commit date
Josh Henderson; SG	Westerville, Ohio	Westerville Central High School	6 ft 4 in (1.93 m)	170 lb (77 kg)	
Josh Henderson; SG	Recruit ratings: Rivals: 247Sports: ESPN: (N/A)				
Tai Perkins; PG	Westerville, Ohio	Westerville Central High School	5 ft 11 in (1.80 m)	165 lb (75 kg)	
Tai Perkins; PG	Recruit ratings: Rivals: 247Sports: ESPN: (N/A)				
Overall recruit ranking:
Note: In many cases, Scout, Rivals, 247Sports, On3, and ESPN may conflict in their listings of height and weight.; In these cases, the average was taken. ESPN grades are on a 100-point scale.; Sources: "2025 Team Ranking". Rivals.

== Preseason ==
On October 21, 2025, the MAC released the preseason coaches poll. Akron was picked to finish first in the MAC regular season and received 11 of the 13 first place votes.

=== Preseason rankings ===
MAC preseason poll
Predicted finish	Team	Votes (1st place)
1	Akron	143 (11)
2	Miami (OH)	133 (2)
3	Kent State	122
4	Ohio	108
5	UMass	98
6	Toledo	95
7	Bowling Green	73
8	Ball State	62
9	Eastern Michigan	52
10	Western Michigan	46
11	Buffalo	37
12	Central Michigan	31
13	Northern Illinois	14

MAC Tournament Champions: Akron (8), Miami (OH) (2), Kent State (1), Ohio (1), UMass (1)

=== Preseason All-MAC ===
Preseason All-MAC teams
Team	Player	Position	Year
First	Tavari Johnson	Guard	Senior
Second	Evan Mahaffey	Wing	Senior
Second	Shammah Scott	Guard	Graduate Student

== Roster ==
2025–26 Akron Zips men's basketball team
Players
Coaches

Pos.	#	Name	Height	Weight	Year	Previous school	Hometown
F	0	Amani Lyles	6 ft 9 in (2.06 m)	240 lb (109 kg)	Sr	Beechcroft High School	Columbus, Ohio
G	1	Shammah Scott	6 ft 2 in (1.88 m)	200 lb (91 kg)	GS	Wichita State	Cleveland, Ohio
F	2	Rich Brisco	6 ft 8 in (2.03 m)	240 lb (109 kg)	RS Fr	Hillcrest Prep	Brooklyn, New York
G	3	Sharron Young	6 ft 0 in (1.83 m)	160 lb (73 kg)	So	Morgantown High School	Morgantown, West Virginia
G	4	Eric Mahaffey	6 ft 6 in (1.98 m)	200 lb (91 kg)	RS Fr	Archbishop Moeller High School	Cincinnati, Ohio
G	5	Tavari Johnson	6 ft 0 in (1.83 m)	170 lb (77 kg)	Sr	Lyons High School	Chicago, Illinois
G	6	Tai Perkins	6 ft 0 in (1.83 m)	150 lb (68 kg)	Fr	Westerville Central High School	Westerville, Ohio
G	7	Josh Henderson	6 ft 5 in (1.96 m)	170 lb (77 kg)	Fr	Westerville Central High School	Westerville, Ohio
F	8	Chabi Barre	6 ft 10 in (2.08 m)	225 lb (102 kg)	RS Jr	Duquesne	Cotonou, Benin
G	9	Cody Head	6 ft 3 in (1.91 m)	195 lb (88 kg)	Jr	Arkansas State	Cleveland, Ohio
G	11	Conner Groce	6 ft 0 in (1.83 m)	165 lb (75 kg)	RS Fr	Revere High School	Richfield, Ohio
G/F	12	Evan Mahaffey	6 ft 6 in (1.98 m)	215 lb (98 kg)	Sr	Ohio State	Cincinnati, Ohio
G	15	Bowen Hardman	6 ft 3 in (1.91 m)	190 lb (86 kg)	Sr	Ohio State	Cincinnati, Ohio
G/F	16	Ognjen Stankovic	6 ft 8 in (2.03 m)	205 lb (93 kg)	Fr	KK Igokea	Belgrade, Serbia
G/F	21	Zach Halligan	6 ft 5 in (1.96 m)	210 lb (95 kg)	RS So	Walsh Jesuit High School	Uniontown, Ohio
G/F	23	Marvin Musiime-Kamali	6 ft 6 in (1.98 m)	195 lb (88 kg)	RS So	Cushing Academy	Brockton, Massachusetts

Head coach

- John Groce (Taylor)

Assistant coach(es)

- Dustin Ford (Ohio)
- Robby Pridgen (Roanoke)
- Mike Allen (Ohio)
- Jon Ekey (Illinois State)
- Devan Morrow (Ohio State)

Legend

- (C) Team captain
- (S) Suspended
- (I) Ineligible
- (W) Walk-on
- Injured
- Current redshirt

Roster
Last update: November 20, 2025

== Schedule and results ==
Date time, TV	Rank^{#}	Opponent^{#}	Result	Record	High points	High rebounds	High assists	Site (attendance) city, state
Regular season
November 3, 2025*; 7:00 p.m., ESPN+		James Madison; MAC-SBC Challenge	W 85–71	1–0	22 – Lyles	9 – Lyles	7 – Ev. Mahaffey	James A. Rhodes Arena (2,461); Akron, OH
November 8, 2025*; 12:00 p.m., ESPN+		Princeton	W 104–69	2–0	21 – Johnson	9 – Er. Mahaffey	6 – Johnson	James A. Rhodes Arena (1,502); Akron, OH
November 12, 2025*; 7:00 p.m.		Penn State Shenango	W 109–51	3–0	18 – Scott	9 – Lyles	8 – Scott	James A. Rhodes Arena (1,108); Akron, OH
November 16, 2025*; 7:30 p.m., BTN		at No. 2 Purdue	L 79–97	3–1	20 – Johnson	5 – Ev. Mahaffey	5 – Scott	Mackey Arena (14,876); West Lafayette, IN
November 21, 2025*; 5:30 p.m., ESPN+		vs. Iona; Paradise Jam quarterfinals	W 96–75	4–1	20 – Er. Mahaffey	8 – Er. Mahaffey	5 – Tied	UVI Sports and Fitness Center; St. Thomas, USVI
November 23, 2025*; 8:00 p.m., ESPN+		vs. Evansville; Paradise Jam semifinals	W 97–59	5–1	19 – Tied	5 – Tied	7 – Ev. Mahaffey	UVI Sports and Fitness Center (1,924); St. Thomas, USVI
November 24, 2025*; 8:00 p.m., ESPN+		vs. Yale; Paradise Jam championship game	L 94–97	5–2	35 – Johnson	7 – Er. Mahaffey	8 – Johnson	UVI Sports and Fitness Center (2,186); St. Thomas, USVI
November 29, 2025*; 7:00 p.m., ESPN+		Milwaukee	W 105–81	6–2	25 – Lyles	9 – Lyles	11 – Johnson	James A. Rhodes Arena (1,697); Akron, OH
December 3, 2025*; 7:00 p.m., ESPN+		Bucknell	W 97–77	7−2	24 – Lyles	5 – Tied	6 – Young	James A. Rhodes Arena (1,508); Akron, OH
December 6, 2025*; 4:00 p.m., ESPN+		at Tulane	W 88–71	8−2	20 – Scott	11 – Er. Mahaffey	5 – Johnson	Devlin Fieldhouse (902); New Orleans, LA
December 13, 2025*; 4:00 p.m., BallerTV		vs. Murray State; Jack Jones Classic	L 100–115	8–3	28 – Johnson	6 – Tied	6 – Ev. Mahaffey	Lee's Family Forum; Henderson, NV
December 19, 2025; 7:00 p.m., ESPN+		Eastern Michigan	W 93–72	9–3 (1–0)	25 – Johnson	12 – Lyles	5 – Tied	James A. Rhodes Arena (1,843); Akron, OH
December 29, 2025*; 7:00 p.m.		Concord	W 115–64	10–3	28 – Johnson	7 – Lyles	6 – Johnson	James A. Rhodes Arena (1,981); Akron, OH
January 3, 2026; 3:30 p.m., ESPN+		at Miami (OH)	L 73–76	10–4 (1–1)	22 – Johnson	13 – Er. Mahaffey	4 – Johnson	Millett Hall (4,111); Oxford, OH
January 6, 2026; 7:00 p.m., ESPN+		Central Michigan	W 82–69	11–4 (2–1)	22 – Johnson	7 – Lyles	10 – Johnson	James A. Rhodes Arena (1,623); Akron, OH
January 9, 2026; 8:00 p.m., CBSSN		at Bowling Green	W 77–67	12–4 (3–1)	18 – Lyles	10 – Lyles	7 – Johnson	Stroh Center (2,272); Bowling Green, OH
January 13, 2026; 7:00 p.m., ESPN+		Ball State	W 87–77	13–4 (4–1)	22 – Johnson	12 – Lyles	7 – Johnson	James A. Rhodes Arena (1,934); Akron, OH
January 17, 2026; 2:00 p.m., ESPN+		Western Michigan	W 104–89	14–4 (5–1)	32 – Johnson	6 – Tied	8 – Johnson	James A. Rhodes Arena (2,396); Akron, OH
January 20, 2026; 6:30 p.m., ESPN+		at Buffalo	W 82–63	15–4 (6–1)	18 – Lyles	15 – Lyles	6 – Johnson	Alumni Arena (1,203); Amherst, NY
January 23, 2026; 8:00 p.m., ESPNU		at Ohio	W 86–65	16–4 (7–1)	24 – Johnson	11 – Lyles	5 – Ev. Mahaffey	Convocation Center (4,422); Athens, OH
January 27, 2026; 7:00 p.m., ESPN+		Toledo	W 91–81	17–4 (8–1)	25 – Johnson	9 – Ev. Mahaffey	7 – Johnson	James A. Rhodes Arena (2,100); Akron, OH
January 30, 2026; 6:00 p.m., CBSSN		Kent State	W 69–52	18–4 (9–1)	16 – Johnson	9 – Johnson	4 – Johnson	James A. Rhodes Arena (4,847); Akron, OH
February 3, 2026; 6:30 p.m., ESPN+		at Eastern Michigan	W 66–64	19–4 (10–1)	17 – Johnson	8 – Lyles	4 – Lyles	George Gervin GameAbove Center (1,452); Ypsilanti, MI
February 7, 2026*; 6:00 p.m., ESPN2		at Troy; MAC-SBC Challenge	L 69–79	19–5	26 – Johnson	7 – Tied	5 – Tied	Trojan Arena (3,712); Troy, AL
February 13, 2026; 9:00 p.m., CBSSN		UMass	W 99–92	20–5 (11–1)	23 – Johnson	11 – Er. Mahaffey	4 – Johnson	James A. Rhodes Arena (2,125); Akron, OH
February 17, 2026; 7:00 p.m., ESPN+		at Western Michigan	W 90–73	21–5 (12–1)	17 – Johnson	9 – Lyles	6 – Johnson	University Arena (1,239); Kalamazoo, MI
February 20, 2026; 6:30 p.m., CBSSN		at Ball State	W 78–65	22–5 (13–1)	26 – Lyles	8 – Lyles	6 – Johnson	Worthen Arena (2,680); Muncie, IN
February 24, 2026; 7:00 p.m., ESPN+		Buffalo	W 99–85	23–5 (14–1)	23 – Johnson	10 – Lyles	5 – Tied	James A. Rhodes Arena (2,323); Akron, OH
February 27, 2026; 8:00 p.m., ESPNU		at Kent State	W 92–70	24–5 (15–1)	23 – Scott	8 – Lyles	7 – Johnson	MAC Center (6,327); Kent, OH
March 3, 2026; 7:00 p.m., ESPN+		at Central Michigan	W 77–64	25–5 (16–1)	17 – Johnson	16 – Ev. Mahaffey	4 – Tied	McGuirk Arena (1,901); Mount Pleasant, MI
March 6, 2026; 6:00 p.m., CBSSN		Northern Illinois	W 94–55	26–5 (17–1)	20 – Hardman	6 – Tied	7 – Scott	James A. Rhodes Arena (2,768); Akron, OH
MAC Tournament
March 12, 2026; 4:30 p.m., ESPN+	(2)	vs. (7) Buffalo; Quarterfinal	W 73–70	27–5	25 – Johnson	16 – Lyles	3 – Tied	Rocket Arena; Cleveland, OH
March 13, 2026; 7:30 p.m., CBSSN	(2)	vs. (3) Kent State; Semifinal	W 75–68	28–5	18 – Tied	8 – Lyles	3 – Johnson	Rocket Arena (10,936); Cleveland, OH
March 14, 2026; 8:00 p.m., ESPN2	(2)	vs. (4) Toledo; Championship	W 79–76	29–5	15 – Tied	16 – Lyles	5 – Johnson	Rocket Arena (11,072); Cleveland, OH
NCAA Tournament
March 20, 2026; 12:40 p.m., truTV	(12 MW)	vs. (5 MW) No. 20 Texas Tech; First round	L 71–91	29–6	26 – Lyles	6 – Mahaffey	6 – Johnson	Benchmark International Arena (17,769); Tampa, FL
*Non-conference game. ^{#}Rankings from AP Poll. (#) Tournament seedings in parentheses. MW=Midwest. All times are in Eastern.
