= 2025–26 Buffalo Bulls men's basketball team =

American college basketball season

2025–26 Buffalo Bulls men's basketball

Fort Myers Tip-Off Palms Division co-champions
- Conference: Mid-American Conference
- Record: 17–15 (7–11 MAC)
- Head coach: George Halcovage III (3rd season)
- Assistant coaches: Hamlet Tibbs (3rd season); Raman Sposato (1st season); Jack Fitzpatrick (2nd season); Henry Lowe (1st season); Kevin Voigt (2nd season)
- Home arena: Alumni Arena

2025–26 Mid-American Conference men's basketball standings
| | Conf. | | | | Overall |
| Team | W | | L | PCT | W | | L | PCT |
|---|---|---|---|---|---|---|---|---|
| Miami (OH) | 18 | – | 0 | 1.000 | 31 | – | 1 | .969 |
| Akron † | 17 | – | 1 | .944 | 29 | – | 5 | .853 |
| Kent State | 14 | – | 4 | .778 | 24 | – | 9 | .727 |
| Toledo | 11 | – | 7 | .611 | 19 | – | 15 | .559 |
| Bowling Green | 9 | – | 9 | .500 | 18 | – | 14 | .563 |
| Ohio | 9 | – | 9 | .500 | 15 | – | 17 | .469 |
| Buffalo | 7 | – | 11 | .389 | 17 | – | 15 | .531 |
| UMass | 7 | – | 11 | .389 | 17 | – | 16 | .515 |
| Ball State | 7 | – | 11 | .389 | 12 | – | 19 | .387 |
| Central Michigan | 6 | – | 12 | .333 | 10 | – | 21 | .323 |
| Western Michigan | 4 | – | 14 | .222 | 10 | – | 21 | .323 |
| Northern Illinois | 4 | – | 14 | .222 | 9 | – | 21 | .300 |
| Eastern Michigan | 4 | – | 14 | .222 | 10 | – | 21 | .323 |
† 2026 MAC tournament winner As of March 14, 2026; Rankings from AP Poll

The 2025–26 Buffalo Bulls men's basketball team represented the State University of New York at Buffalo during the 2025–26 NCAA Division I men's basketball season. The Bulls, led by third-year head coach George Halcovage III, played their home games at Alumni Arena located in Amherst, New York as members of the Mid-American Conference.

They finished the 2025–26 season 17–15, 7–11 in MAC play, to finish tied for 7th place. They qualified for the MAC tournament as the 7th seed where they lost in the quarterfinals to Akron

== Previous season ==
The Bulls finished the previous season 9–22, 4–14 in MAC play, to finish in eleventh place. They failed to qualify for the MAC tournament.

== Offseason ==
=== Departures ===
Departures
| Name | Number | Pos. | Height | Weight | Year | Hometown | Reason for departure |
|---|---|---|---|---|---|---|---|
| Anquan Boldin Jr. | 4 | G | 6'4" | 195 | Sophomore | Delray Beach, Florida | Transferred to Florida A&M |
| Tyson Dunn | 5 | G | 6'3" | 190 | Senior | Newmarket, Ontario | Transferred to UC San Diego |
| Brayden Jackson | 7 | G | 6'8" | 185 | Freshman | Milton, Ontario | Transferred to St. Bonaventure |
| Ben Michaels | 8 | F | 6'8" | 210 | Freshman | Ipswich, England | Transferred to Vermont |
| Lloyd McVeigh | 9 | G | 6'6" | 205 | Sophomore | Brooklyn, New York | Signed with Cairns Taipans of the NBL |
| Eric Kenesie Jr. | 10 | G | 6'0" | 180 | Freshman | Kenosha, Wisconsin | Transferred to Upper Iowa |
| Bryson Wilson | 11 | G | 6'5" | 210 | Sophomore | Washington, DC | Transferred to Binghamton |
| Frederiks Meinarts | 14 | C/F | 7'0" | 196 | Freshman | Riga, Latvia | Transferred to Lynn |
| Sam Akot | 15 | G/F | 6'7" | 180 | Freshman | London, Ontario | Left program |
| Kavon Bradford | 22 | G | 6'2 | 180 | Freshman | Portland, Oregon | Transferred to Northern Arizona |

=== Incoming transfers ===
Incoming transfers
| Name | Number | Pos. | Height | Weight | Year | Hometown | Previous school |
|---|---|---|---|---|---|---|---|
| Mikhail Pocknett | 3 | F | 6'6" | 235 | Junior | Wilmington, North Carolina | King University |
| Daniel Freitag | 5 | G | 6'2" | 192 | Sophomore | Bloomington, Minnesota | Wisconsin |
| Derrick Talton Jr. | 10 | G | 5'10" | 157 | Graduate | Fort Worth, Texas | Oklahoma Wesleyan |
| Kyle Jones | 12 | G/F | 6'5" | 195 | RS Junior | Frisco, Texas | St. Thomas Aquinas |
| Ezra McKenna | 13 | F | 6'10" | 243 | Graduate | Fort Walton Beach, Florida | Mobile |
| Angelo Brizzi | 14 | G | 6'3" | 193 | Graduate | Warrenton, Virginia | Longwood |

== Preseason ==
On October 21, 2025, the MAC released the preseason coaches' poll. Buffalo was picked to finish eleventh in the MAC regular season.

=== Preseason rankings ===
MAC preseason poll
| Predicted finish | Team | Votes (1st place) |
|---|---|---|
| 1 | Akron | 143 (11) |
| 2 | Miami (OH) | 133 (2) |
| 3 | Kent State | 122 |
| 4 | Ohio | 108 |
| 5 | UMass | 98 |
| 6 | Toledo | 95 |
| 7 | Bowling Green | 73 |
| 8 | Ball State | 62 |
| 9 | Eastern Michigan | 52 |
| 10 | Western Michigan | 46 |
| 11 | Buffalo | 37 |
| 12 | Central Michigan | 31 |
| 13 | Northern Illinois | 14 |

MAC Tournament Champions: Akron (8), Miami-Ohio (2), Kent State (1), Ohio (1), UMass (1)

=== Preseason All-MAC ===
No Bulls were named to any of the Preseason All-MAC teams.

== Roster ==
2025–26 Buffalo Bulls men's basketball team
Players
Coaches

| Pos. | # | Name | Height | Weight | Year | Previous school | Hometown |
|---|---|---|---|---|---|---|---|
| F | 0 | Matas Buteliauskas | 6 ft 7 in (2.01 m) | 200 lb (91 kg) | Fr | DME Academy | Vilnius, Lithuania |
| G/F | 1 | Noah Batchelor | 6 ft 8 in (2.03 m) | 210 lb (95 kg) | Sr | Maryland | Frederick, MD |
| G | 2 | Ryan Sabol | 6 ft 3 in (1.91 m) | 195 lb (88 kg) | Jr | Gonzaga College HS | Washington, D.C. |
| F | 3 | Mikhail Pocknett | 6 ft 6 in (1.98 m) | 235 lb (107 kg) | Jr | King | Wilmington, NC |
| G | 5 | Daniel Freitag | 6 ft 2 in (1.88 m) | 192 lb (87 kg) | So | Wisconsin | Bloomington, MN |
| G | 8 | Omar Migues-Hibeljic | 6 ft 5 in (1.96 m) | 200 lb (91 kg) | So | Collège Jean-de-Brébeuf | Quebec City, QC |
| G | 10 | Derrick Talton Jr. | 5 ft 10 in (1.78 m) | 157 lb (71 kg) | GS | Oklahoma Wesleyan | Fort Worth, TX |
| G/F | 12 | Kyle Jones | 6 ft 5 in (1.96 m) | 195 lb (88 kg) | RS Jr | St. Thomas Aquinas | Frisco, TX |
| F | 13 | Ezra McKenna | 6 ft 10 in (2.08 m) | 243 lb (110 kg) | GS | Mobile | Fort Walton Beach, FL |
| G | 14 | Angelo Brizzi | 6 ft 3 in (1.91 m) | 193 lb (88 kg) | GS | Longwood | Warrenton, VA |
| F | 15 | Aleksa Vlajic | 6 ft 10 in (2.08 m) | 225 lb (102 kg) | Fr | Hoosac School | Belgrade, Serbia |
| G | 20 | Daniel Shao | 5 ft 10 in (1.78 m) | 175 lb (79 kg) | Jr | Parsippany Hills HS | Morris Plains, NJ |
| C | 33 | Tim Oboh | 6 ft 11 in (2.11 m) | 230 lb (104 kg) | So | Canterbury Academy | Orpington, England |
| G | 35 | Evan Romano | 6 ft 3 in (1.91 m) | 185 lb (84 kg) | Fr | St. Rose HS | Holmdel, NJ |

Head coach

- George Halcovage (Babson)

Assistant coach(es)

- Hamlet Tibbs (West Virginia)
- Jack Fitzpatrick (Emmanuel)
- Kevin Voigt (Villanova)

Legend

- (C) Team captain
- (S) Suspended
- (I) Ineligible
- (W) Walk-on
- Injured
- Current redshirt

Roster
Last update: November 28, 2025

== Schedule and results ==
| Date time, TV | Rank^{#} | Opponent^{#} | Result | Record | High points | High rebounds | High assists | Site (attendance) city, state |
Exhibition
| October 25, 2025*; 7:00 p.m., Cuse.com | | vs. Syracuse | L 66–76 | – | 18 – McKenna | 10 – Batchelor | 4 – Talton Jr. | KeyBank Center; Buffalo, NY |
Regular season
| November 3, 2025*; 6:30 p.m., ESPN+ | | Southern Miss; MAC-SBC Challenge | W 85–79 | 1–0 | 32 – Sabol | 11 – Batchelor | 4 – Tied | Alumni Arena (1,631); Amherst, NY |
| November 7, 2025*; 6:30 p.m., ESPN+ | | Green Bay | W 83–76 | 2–0 | 21 – Talton Jr. | 7 – Batchelor | 4 – Talton Jr. | Alumni Arena (1,373); Amherst, NY |
| November 11, 2025*; 8:00 p.m., ESPN+ | | at DePaul | W 66–53 | 3–0 | 20 – Sabol | 6 – Tied | 4 – Freitag | Wintrust Arena (2,818); Chicago, IL |
| November 15, 2025*; 11:00 a.m., ESPN+ | | RIT | W 80–64 | 4–0 | 27 – Freitag | 7 – Tied | 5 – Tied | Alumni Arena (1,175); Amherst, NY |
| November 18, 2025*; 6:30 p.m., ESPN+ | | Vermont | W 94–90 | 5–0 | 33 – Freitag | 4 – Tied | 5 – Sabol | Alumni Arena (1,466); Amherst, NY |
| November 24, 2025*; 2:30 p.m., PTB Live | | vs. VMI; Fort Myers Tip-Off Palms Division | W 78–70 | 6–0 | 17 – Freitag | 10 – McKenna | 4 – Talton Jr. | Suncoast Credit Union Arena (682); Fort Myers, FL |
| November 26, 2025*; 1:30 p.m., PTB Live | | vs. Bucknell; Fort Myers Tip-Off Palms Division | W 73–71 | 7–0 | 25 – Brizzi | 9 – Freitag | 3 – Freitag | Suncoast Credit Union Arena (621); Fort Myers, FL |
| November 29, 2025*; 6:00 p.m., ESPN+ | | at Canisius | W 71–53 | 8–0 | 24 – Sabol | 6 – Freitag | 5 – Talton Jr. | Koessler Athletic Center (1,503); Buffalo, NY |
| December 6, 2025*; 2:00 p.m., ESPN+ | | St. Bonaventure | L 69–77 | 8–1 | 21 – Sabol | 5 – Oboh | 7 – Freitag | Alumni Arena (5,616); Amherst, NY |
| December 9, 2025*; 5:00 p.m., ESPN+ | | at UMBC | W 83–79 | 9–1 | 19 – Oboh | 6 – Freitag | 4 – Sabol | Chesapeake Arena (845); Catonsville, MD |
| December 14, 2025*; 1:00 p.m., ESPN+ | | at East Carolina | L 70–73 | 9–2 | 31 – Freitag | 13 – Pocknett | 4 – Talton Jr. | Williams Arena (2,579); Greenville, NC |
| December 20, 2025; 1:00 p.m., ESPN+ | | at Western Michigan | W 88–71 | 10–2 (1–0) | 20 – Freitag | 13 – Oboh | 6 – Freitag | University Arena (1,403); Kalamazoo, MI |
| December 22, 2025*; 6:30 p.m., ESPN+ | | Penn State Behrend | W 92–63 | 11–2 | 31 – Sabol | 8 – Pocknett | 8 – McKenna | Alumni Arena (1,327); Amherst, NY |
| December 31, 2025; 1:00 p.m., ESPN+ | | at Northern Illinois | W 81–67 | 12–2 (2–0) | 33 – Freitag | 5 – Tied | 4 – Sabol | Convocation Center (1,006); DeKalb, IL |
| January 3, 2026; 2:00 p.m., ESPN+ | | Ball State | W 85–72 | 13–2 (3–0) | 22 – Sabol | 5 – Tied | 5 – Tied | Alumni Arena (2,485); Amherst, NY |
| January 10, 2026; 2:00 p.m., ESPN+ | | at Ohio | L 80–91 | 13–3 (3–1) | 18 – Brizzi | 5 – Tied | 3 – Talton Jr. | Convocation Center (3,872); Athens, OH |
| January 13, 2026; 6:30 p.m., ESPN+ | | Kent State | L 81–87 | 13–4 (3–2) | 33 – Freitag | 6 – Batchelor | 7 – Freitag | Alumni Arena (1,084); Amherst, NY |
| January 17, 2026; 1:00 p.m., ESPN+ | | at Miami (OH) | L 102–105 ^{OT} | 13–5 (3–3) | 24 – Brizzi | 12 – Batchelor | 8 – Freitag | Millett Hall (5,088); Oxford, OH |
| January 20, 2026; 6:30 p.m., ESPN+ | | Akron | L 63–82 | 13–6 (3–4) | 26 – Sabol | 7 – Oboh | 10 – Talton Jr. | Alumni Arena (1,203); Amherst, NY |
| January 23, 2026; 7:00 p.m., CBSSN | | UMass | L 67–68 | 13–7 (3–5) | 27 – Sabol | 6 – Pocknett | 7 – Freitag | Alumni Arena (2,310); Amherst, NY |
| January 27, 2026; 7:00 p.m., ESPN+ | | at Bowling Green | W 89–78 | 14–7 (4–5) | 22 – Sabol | 7 – Oboh | 5 – Sabol | Stroh Center (2,298); Bowling Green, OH |
| January 31, 2026; 2:00 p.m., ESPN+ | | Ohio | L 83–95 | 14–8 (4–6) | 25 – Freitag | 6 – Tied | 5 – Sabol | Alumni Arena (2,005); Amherst, NY |
| February 3, 2025; 6:30 p.m., ESPN+ | | No. 23 Miami (OH) | L 71–73 | 14–9 (4–7) | 22 – Brizzi | 8 – Oboh | 7 – Freitag | Alumni Arena (3,507); Amherst, NY |
| February 7, 2026*; 4:00 p.m., ESPN+ | | at South Alabama; MAC-SBC Challenge | L 69–81 | 14–10 | 26 – Brizzi | 8 – Sabol | 10 – Talton Jr. | Mitchell Center; Mobile, AL |
| February 11, 2025; 7:00 p.m., ESPN+ | | at Ball State | W 63–53 | 15–10 (5–7) | 20 – Oboh | 8 – Oboh | 5 – Sabol | Worthen Arena (2,460); Muncie, IN |
| February 17, 2026; 6:30 p.m., ESPN+ | | Northern Illinois | L 70–72 | 15–11 (5–8) | 25 – Brizzi | 6 – Tied | 4 – Jones | Alumni Arena (1,802); Amherst, NY |
| February 21, 2026; 6:00 p.m., ESPN+ | | at UMass | W 86–82 ^{OT} | 16–11 (6–8) | 27 – Brizzi | 9 – Oboh | 10 – Sabol | Mullins Center (5,096); Amherst, MA |
| February 24, 2026; 7:00 p.m., ESPN+ | | at Akron | L 85–99 | 16–12 (6–9) | 28 – Sabol | 9 – Sabol | 5 – Talton Jr. | James A. Rhodes Arena (2,323); Akron, OH |
| February 28, 2025; 2:00 p.m., ESPN+ | | Central Michigan | L 70–75 | 16–13 (6–10) | 17 – Sabol | 4 – Tied | 6 – Tied | Alumni Arena (2,499); Amherst, NY |
| March 3, 2026; 6:30 p.m., ESPN+ | | Eastern Michigan | W 72–67 | 17–13 (7–10) | 27 – Sabol | 10 – Oboh | 4 – Tied | Alumni Arena (1,386); Amherst, NY |
| March 6, 2025; 7:00 p.m., ESPN+ | | at Toledo | L 78–99 | 17–14 (7–11) | 26 – Sabol | 7 – Batchelor | 3 – Talton Jr. | Savage Arena (4,539); Toledo, OH |
MAC tournament
| March 12, 2026; 4:00 p.m., ESPN+ | (7) | vs. (2) Akron; Quarterfinals | L 70–73 | 17–15 | 24 – Sabol | 12 – Oboh | 6 – Talton Jr. | Rocket Arena; Cleveland, OH |
*Non-conference game. ^{#}Rankings from AP Poll. (#) Tournament seedings in parentheses. All times are in Eastern.
