= 2025–26 Eastern Michigan Eagles men's basketball team =

American college basketball season

2025–26 Eastern Michigan Eagles men's basketball
- Conference: Mid-American Conference
- Record: 10–21 (4–14 MAC)
- Head coach: Stan Heath (5th season)
- Assistant coaches: Bob Simon (5th season); Shawn Trice (5th season); Drew Denisco (5th season)
- Home arena: George Gervin GameAbove Center

2025–26 Mid-American Conference men's basketball standings
	Conf.				Overall
Team	W		L	PCT	W		L	PCT
Miami (OH)	18	–	0	1.000	32	–	2	.941
Akron †	17	–	1	.944	29	–	6	.829
Kent State	14	–	4	.778	24	–	10	.706
Toledo	11	–	7	.611	19	–	15	.559
Bowling Green	9	–	9	.500	18	–	14	.563
Ohio	9	–	9	.500	15	–	17	.469
Buffalo	7	–	11	.389	17	–	15	.531
UMass	7	–	11	.389	17	–	16	.515
Ball State	7	–	11	.389	12	–	19	.387
Central Michigan	6	–	12	.333	10	–	21	.323
Western Michigan	4	–	14	.222	10	–	21	.323
Northern Illinois	4	–	14	.222	9	–	21	.300
Eastern Michigan	4	–	14	.222	10	–	21	.323
† 2026 MAC tournament winner

The 2025–26 Eastern Michigan Eagles men's basketball team represented Eastern Michigan University during the 2025–26 NCAA Division I men's basketball season. The Eagles, led by fifth-year head coach Stan Heath, played their home games at the George Gervin GameAbove Center in Ypsilanti, Michigan as members of the Mid-American Conference (MAC). The team finished the season 10–21, 4–14 in MAC play to finish in a three-way tie for last place. They failed to qualify for the MAC tournament.

Following the season, the school announced head coach Stan Heath would not return after a 57–99 record over five seasons. On March 17, 2026, the school named Clemson assistant Billy Donlon the team's new head coach.

== Previous season ==
The Eagles finished the 2024–25 season 16–16, 9–9 in MAC play to finish in sixth place. They qualified for the MAC tournament for the first time since 2018. They lost to Miami (OH) in the first round of the tournament.

== Offseason ==
=== Departures ===
Departures
Name	Number	Pos.	Height	Year	Hometown	Reason for departure
Jalin Billingsley	1	F	6' 8"	Senior	Cleveland, OH	Graduated
Da'Sean Nelson	2	F	6' 8"	Senior	Toledo, OH	Graduated
Jalen Terry	3	G	6' 0"	Senior	Flint, MI	Graduated
Julian Lewis	5	G	6' 6"	RS Junior	Ypsilanti, MI	Transferred to Northwood
Mario Brunetto	7	F	6' 11"	Freshman	La Spezia, Italy	Transferred to Arizona Western
Trey Pettigrew	9	G	6' 4"	RS Sophomore	Chicago, IL	Transferred to Johnson C. Smith
Dillon Tingler	10	G	6' 7"	Freshman	Hurricane, WV	Transferred to Drexel
Micah Schnyders	14	G	6' 4"	RS Senior	Yorkville, IL	Graduated
Yusuf Jihad	22	F	6' 8"	Senior	Farmington Hills, MI	Graduated
Christian Henry	30	G	6' 3"	Junior	Chicago, IL	Transferred to Fordham
Arne Osojnik	44	G	6' 6"	Sophomore	Ljubljana, Slovenia	Transferred to Northern Arizona

=== Incoming transfers ===
Incoming transfers
Name	Number	Pos.	Height	Weight	Year	Hometown	Previous school
Mak Manciel	1	G	6' 4"	195	Senior	Detroit, MI	Detroit Mercy
Carlos Hart	2	G	6' 5"	215	RS Senior	Miami, FL	Valdosta State
Mehki Ellison	3	G	6' 0"	185	Senior	Flint, MI	Stetson
Mohammad Habhab	4	F	6' 9"	220	RS Freshman	Dearborn, MI	Central Michigan
Braelon Green	5	G	6' 3"	180	Junior	Southfield, MI	Bowling Green
Aidan Rubio	7	G/F	6' 7"	200	Senior	Flint, MI	UNC Asheville
Addison Patterson	9	F	6' 7"	220	RS Senior	Mississauga, ON	Northwestern State
Jon Sanders II	10	G	6' 2"	185	Senior	Detroit, MI	Northwestern State
Merritt Alderink	35	F	6' 7"	220	Sophomore	Zeeland, MI	Indiana State

=== Recruiting class ===
College recruiting
Name	Hometown	School	Height	Weight	Commit date
Gregory Lawson II; G	Saginaw, Michigan	Faith Family Academy of Oak Cliff	6 ft 3 in (1.91 m)	200 lb (91 kg)	
Gregory Lawson II; G	Recruit ratings: Rivals: 247Sports: ESPN: (81)				
Overall recruit ranking:
Note: In many cases, Scout, Rivals, 247Sports, On3, and ESPN may conflict in their listings of height and weight.; In these cases, the average was taken. ESPN grades are on a 100-point scale.; Sources: "2025 Team Ranking". Rivals.

== Preseason ==
On October 21, 2025 the MAC released the preseason coaches poll. Eastern Michigan was picked to finish ninth in the MAC regular season.

=== Preseason rankings ===
MAC preseason poll
Predicted finish	Team	Votes (1st place)
1	Akron	143 (11)
2	Miami (OH)	133 (2)
3	Kent State	122
4	Ohio	108
5	UMass	98
6	Toledo	95
7	Bowling Green	73
8	Ball State	62
9	Eastern Michigan	52
10	Western Michigan	46
11	Buffalo	37
12	Central Michigan	31
13	Northern Illinois	14

MAC Tournament Champions: Akron (8), Miami (2), Kent State (1), Ohio (1), UMass (1)

== Roster ==
2025–26 Eastern Michigan Eagles men's basketball team
Players
Coaches

Pos.	#	Name	Height	Weight	Year	Previous school	Hometown
G	0	Gregory Lawson II	6 ft 3 in (1.91 m)	200 lb (91 kg)	Fr	Faith Family Academy of Oak Cliff	Saginaw, MI
G	1	Mak Manciel	6 ft 4 in (1.93 m)	195 lb (88 kg)	Sr	Detroit Mercy	Detroit, MI
G	2	Carlos Hart (S)	6 ft 5 in (1.96 m)	215 lb (98 kg)	RS Sr	Valdosta State	Miami FL
G	3	Mehki Ellison	6 ft 0 in (1.83 m)	185 lb (84 kg)	Jr	Stetson	Flint, MI
F	4	Mohammad Habhab	6 ft 9 in (2.06 m)	220 lb (100 kg)	RS Fr	Central Michigan	Dearborn, MI
G	5	Braelon Green	6 ft 3 in (1.91 m)	180 lb (82 kg)	Jr	Bowling Green	Southfield, MI
G/F	7	Aidan Rubio	6 ft 7 in (2.01 m)	200 lb (91 kg)	Sr	UNC Asheville	Chicago, IL
G	8	Mbaye N'Diaye	6 ft 5 in (1.96 m)	200 lb (91 kg)	So	SEED Academy	Thies, Senegal
F	9	Addison Patterson	6 ft 7 in (2.01 m)	220 lb (100 kg)	RS Sr	Northwestern State	Mississauga, ON
G	10	Jon Sanders II	6 ft 2 in (1.88 m)	185 lb (84 kg)	Sr	Northwestern State	Detroit, MI
F	13	Godslove Nwabude	6 ft 9 in (2.06 m)	220 lb (100 kg)	So	Mt. Zion Prep	Anambra State, Nigeria
C	33	John Shanu II	6 ft 11 in (2.11 m)	245 lb (111 kg)	RS Sr	UT Rio Grande Valley	Houston, TX
F	35	Merritt Alderink	6 ft 7 in (2.01 m)	220 lb (100 kg)	So	Indiana State	Zeeland, MI
G	45	Cooper Smith	6 ft 1 in (1.85 m)	180 lb (82 kg)	Sr	Michigan	Mio, MI

Head coach

- Stan Heath (Eastern Michigan)

Assistant coach(es)

- Bob Simon (Eastern Michigan)
- Shawn Trice (Penn)
- Drew Denisco (Wittenberg)

Legend

- (C) Team captain
- (S) Suspended
- (I) Ineligible
- (W) Walk-on
- Injured
- Current redshirt

Roster
Last update: October, 2025

== Schedule and results ==
Date time, TV	Rank^{#}	Opponent^{#}	Result	Record	High points	High rebounds	High assists	Site (attendance) city, state
Exhibition
October 25, 2025*; 7:30 p.m.		vs. Tuskegee	W 73–65	–	14 – Tied	6 – Patterson	3 – Ellison	Wayne State Fieldhouse; Detroit, MI
Regular season
November 3, 2025*; 6:30 p.m., ESPN+		Georgia State; MAC-SBC Challenge	W 71–49	1–0	15 – Habhab	16 – Habhab	4 – Habhab	George Gervin GameAbove Center (1,729); Ypsilanti, MI
November 10, 2025*; 7:00 p.m., ACCNX		at Pittsburgh	L 66–78	1–1	19 – Hart	7 – Tied	4 – Patterson	Petersen Events Center (4,572); Pittsburgh, PA
November 14, 2025*; 6:30 p.m., ESPN+		IU Indy	L 83–90	1–2	23 – Patterson	10 – Habhab	3 – Tied	George Gervin GameAbove Center (1,655); Ypsilanti, MI
November 18, 2025*; 7:00 p.m., ESPN+		at Detroit Mercy	W 72–62	2–2	17 – Sanders II	10 – Habhab	5 – Habhab	Calihan Hall (1,839); Detroit, MI
November 21, 2025*; 6:30 p.m., ESPN+		Oakland	W 97–91	3–2	24 – Habhab	11 – Habhab	9 – Habhab	George Gervin GameAbove Center (1,727); Ypsilanti, MI
November 24, 2025*; 7:00 p.m., ACCN		at No. 6 Louisville	L 46–87	3–3	12 – Habhab	11 – Habhab	3 – Patterson	KFC Yum! Center (13,832); Louisville, KY
November 26, 2025*; 7:00 p.m., ESPN+		at Cincinnati	W 64–56	4–3	15 – Hart	9 – Patterson	3 – Tied	Fifth Third Arena (9,853); Cincinnati, OH
November 28, 2025*; 4 p.m., ESPN+		NJIT	W 73–55	5–3	22 – Habhab	14 – Nwabude	6 – Patterson	George Gervin GameAbove Center (1,484); Ypsilanti, MI
December 2, 2025*; 7:00 p.m., truTV		at Butler	L 68–84	5–4	15 – Habhab	5 – Tied	5 – Hart	Hinkle Fieldhouse (6,423); Indianapolis, IN
December 5, 2025*; 7:30 p.m., ESPN+		Cleary	W 86–48	6–4	14 – Nwabude	9 – Nwabude	4 – Tied	George Gervin GameAbove Center (2,957); Ypsilanti, MI
December 10, 2025*; 8:00 p.m., ESPN+		at Purdue Fort Wayne	L 65–80	6–5	13 – Patterson	4 – Tied	7 – Hart	Memorial Coliseum (2,092); Fort Wayne, IN
December 19, 2025; 7:00 p.m., ESPN+		at Akron	L 72–93	6–6 (0–1)	32 – Hart	7 – Hart	3 – Sanders II	James A. Rhodes Arena (1,843); Akron, OH
December 22, 2025*; 7:00 p.m., ESPN+		at Wright State	L 64–70	6–7	18 – Tied	7 – Habhab	2 – Patterson	Nutter Center (3,070); Fairborn, OH
December 30, 2025; 7:30 p.m., ESPN+		UMass	W 80–74	7–7 (1–1)	23 – Hart	12 – Hart	6 – Habhab	George Gervin GameAbove Center (2,860); Ypsilanti, MI
January 3, 2026; 2:00 p.m., ESPN+		Ohio	L 67–68	7–8 (1–2)	17 – Patterson	6 – Patterson	3 – Tied	George Gervin GameAbove Center (1,622); Ypsilanti, MI
January 6, 2026; 7:00 p.m., ESPN+		at Ball State	W 74–52	8–8 (2–2)	18 – Hart	9 – Habhab	3 – Tied	Worthen Arena (2,354); Muncie, IN
January 10, 2026; 1:00 p.m., ESPN+		at Western Michigan	L 62–79	8–9 (2–3)	20 – Habhab	9 – Habhab	8 – Patterson	University Arena (1,542); Kalamazoo, MI
January 13, 2026; 6:30 p.m., ESPN+		Northern Illinois	W 77–59	9–9 (3–3)	20 – Patterson	10 – Habhab	6 – Habhab	George Gervin GameAbove Center (1,749); Ypsilanti, MI
January 17, 2026; 1:00 p.m., ESPN+		at Bowling Green	L 79–85	9–10 (3–4)	22 – Tied	12 – Habhab	4 – Ellison	Stroh Center (2,347); Bowling Green, OH
January 24, 2026; 3:30 p.m., ESPN+		Kent State	L 75–76 ^{2OT}	9–11 (3–5)	22 – Habhab	11 – Habhab	5 – Ellison	George Gervin GameAbove Center (2,804); Yspilanti, MI
January 27, 2026; 7:00 p.m., ESPN+		at Central Michigan	L 65–100	9–12 (3–6)	16 – Manciel	5 – Tied	4 – Patterson	McGuirk Arena (1,886); Mount Pleasant, MI
January 31, 2026; 6:00 p.m., ESPN+		at UMass	L 67–70	9–13 (3–7)	20 – Lawson II	9 – Habhab	4 – Tied	Mullins Center (4,753); Amherst, MA
February 3, 2026; 6:30 p.m., ESPN+		Akron	L 64–66	9–14 (3–8)	17 – Lawson II	7 – Tied	4 – Sanders II	George Gervin GameAbove Center (1,452); Ypsilanti, MI
February 7, 2026*; 1:00 p.m., ESPN+		at Appalachian State; MAC-SBC Challenge	L 60–65	9–15	14 – Tied	12 – Habhab	6 – Habhab	Holmes Center (1,870); Boone, NC
February 11, 2026; 7:00 p.m., ESPN+		at Kent State	L 91–95	9–16 (3–9)	32 – Patterson	9 – Habhab	5 – Lawson II	MAC Center (2,438); Kent, OH
February 14, 2026; 2:00 p.m., ESPN+		Western Michigan	L 62–76	9–17 (3–10)	22 – Patterson	9 – Patterson	4 – Tied	George Gervin GameAbove Center (1,804); Ypsilanti, MI
February 17, 2026; 6:30 p.m., ESPN+		Central Michigan	W 66–54	10–17 (4–10)	17 – Lawson II	14 – Habhab	5 – Patterson	George Gervin GameAbove Center (1,517); Ypsilanti, MI
February 21, 2026; 5:00 p.m., ESPN+		at Toledo	L 75–94	10–18 (4–11)	21 – Habhab	9 – Habhab	7 – Habhab	Savage Arena (5,429); Toledo, OH
February 24, 2026; 6:30 p.m., ESPN+		No. 21 Miami (OH)	L 64–74	10–19 (4–12)	29 – Lawson II	10 – Nwabude	7 – Patterson	George Gervin GameAbove Center (3,136); Ypsilanti, MI
March 3, 2026; 6:30 p.m, ESPN+		at Buffalo	L 67–72	10–20 (4–13)	18 – Habhab	11 – Nwabude	4 – Tied	Alumni Arena (1,386); Amherst, NY
March 6, 2026; 6:30 p.m., ESPN+		Bowling Green	L 69–77	10–21 (4–14)	21 – Patterson	9 – Patterson	2 – Tied	George Gervin GameAbove Center (2,321); Ypsilanti, MI
*Non-conference game. ^{#}Rankings from AP Poll. (#) Tournament seedings in parentheses. All times are in Eastern Time.
