= 2026 MAC men's basketball tournament =

Basketball tournament

2026 Mid-American Conference men's basketball tournament
- Classification: Division I
- Season: 2025–26
- Teams: 8
- Site: Rocket Arena; Cleveland, Ohio
- Champions: Akron (7th title)
- Winning coach: John Groce (6th title)
- Television: ESPN2 Final; CBSSN Semifinals; ESPN+ Quarterfinals

2025–26 Mid-American Conference men's basketball standings
	Conf.				Overall
Team	W		L	PCT	W		L	PCT
Miami (OH)	18	–	0	1.000	32	–	2	.941
Akron †	17	–	1	.944	29	–	6	.829
Kent State	14	–	4	.778	24	–	10	.706
Toledo	11	–	7	.611	19	–	15	.559
Bowling Green	9	–	9	.500	18	–	14	.563
Ohio	9	–	9	.500	15	–	17	.469
Buffalo	7	–	11	.389	17	–	15	.531
UMass	7	–	11	.389	17	–	16	.515
Ball State	7	–	11	.389	12	–	19	.387
Central Michigan	6	–	12	.333	10	–	21	.323
Western Michigan	4	–	14	.222	10	–	21	.323
Northern Illinois	4	–	14	.222	9	–	21	.300
Eastern Michigan	4	–	14	.222	10	–	21	.323
† 2026 MAC tournament winner

The 2026 Mid-American Conference men's basketball tournament was the postseason men's basketball tournament for the Mid-American Conference (MAC) held March 12–14, 2026. The tournament was played at Rocket Arena in Cleveland, Ohio. The tournament winner, Akron, received the conference's automatic invitation to the 2026 NCAA Division I Men's Basketball Tournament.

Top seeded Miami entered the tournament undefeated at 31–0 and they were also ranked #20 in the AP poll. They suffered their first loss of the season when eighth seeded UMass upset them in the first round. Second seeded Akron defeated Buffalo, Kent State, and Toledo to win their third straight MAC tournament title to advance to the 2026 NCAA tournament. Tavari Johnson of Akron was named tournament MVP.

== Format ==
As with all MAC tournaments that have done since 2021, only the top eight teams qualified. The winner of the tournament received the MAC's automatic bid to the 2026 NCAA tournament.

== Venue ==
The 2026 MAC tournament was held at Rocket Arena for the 27th consecutive season. The venue, located in downtown Cleveland at One Center Court, is the home of the Cleveland Cavaliers of the National Basketball Association (NBA) and has a seating capacity for basketball of 19,432.

== Seeds ==
The top eight out of the thirteen MAC teams qualified for the tournament. Teams will be seeded by record within the conference, with a tiebreaker system to seed teams with identical conference records.

Seed	School	Conference Record	Tiebreaker
1	Miami (OH)	18–0	
2	Akron	17–1	
3	Kent State	14–4	
4	Toledo	11–7	
5	Bowling Green	9–9	1–0 vs. Ohio
6	Ohio	9–9	0–1 vs. Bowling Green
7	Buffalo	7–11	3–1 vs. UMass & Ball State
8	UMass	7–11	2–2 vs. Buffalo & Ball State
DNQ	Ball State	7–11	1–3 vs. Buffalo & UMass
DNQ	Central Michigan	6–12	
DNQ	Western Michigan	4–14	2–1 vs. Northern Illinois & Eastern Michigan
DNQ	Northern Illinois	4–14	1–1 vs. Western Michigan & Eastern Michigan
DNQ	Eastern Michigan	4–14	1–2 vs. Western Michigan & Northern Illinois

== Schedule ==
Session	Game	Time *	Matchup	Score	Attendance	Television
Quarterfinals – Thursday, March 12
1	1	11:00 a.m.	No. 1 Miami (OH) vs. No. 8 UMass	83−87	9,123	ESPN+
1	2	1:30 p.m.	No. 4 Toledo vs. No. 5 Bowling Green	77−76	9,123	ESPN+
1	3	4:00 p.m.	No. 2 Akron vs. No. 7 Buffalo	73−70	9,123	ESPN+
1	4	6:30 p.m.	No. 3 Kent State vs. No. 6 Ohio	86–75	9,123	ESPN+
Semifinals – Friday, March 13
2	5	5:00 p.m.	No. 4 Toledo vs. No. 8 UMass	77−67	10,936	CBSSN
2	6	7:30 p.m.	No. 2 Akron vs. No. 3 Kent State	75−68	10,936	CBSSN
Final – Saturday, March 14
3	7	8:00 p.m.	No. 2 Akron vs. No. 4 Toledo	79−76	11,072	ESPN2
* Game times are in EDT. ()-Rankings denote tournament seeding.

== Bracket ==
Quarterfinals; Thursday, March 12; ESPN+
1	20 Miami (OH)	83
8	UMass	87
4	Toledo	77
5	Bowling Green	76
2	Akron	73
7	Buffalo	70
3	Kent State	86
6	Ohio	75

Semifinals; Friday, March 13; CBSSN
8	UMass	67
4	Toledo	77
2	Akron	75
3	Kent State	68

Final; Saturday, March 14; ESPN2
4	Toledo	76
2	Akron	79

== Game summaries ==
=== Quarterfinal round ===
ESPN+

March 12
11:00 a.m. EDT

Box score

No. 1 Miami (OH) 83, No. 8 UMass 87
Scoring by half: 39–37, 44−50
Pts: 17 – Byers; Rebs: 5 – Tied (2); Asts: 7 – Tied (2)	Pts: 25 – Bettiol; Rebs: 8 – Tied (3); Asts: 8 – Carbuccia
Game 1

Rocket Arena
Cleveland, OH
Referees: Anslinger, Burris, Floyd

ESPN+

March 12
1:30 p.m. EDT

Box score

No. 4 Toledo 77, No. 5 Bowling Green 76
Scoring by half: 37−38, 40−38
Pts: 23 – Blyden Jr. Rebs: 7 – Wilson; Asts: 3 – Tied (2)	Pts: 16 – Campbell; Rebs: 9 – Towns; Asts: 4 – Tied (2)
Game 2

Rocket Arena
Cleveland, OH
Referees: Griffith, Love. Smith

ESPN+

March 12
4:00 p.m. EDT

Box score

No. 2 Akron 73, No. 7 Buffalo 70
Scoring by half: 42–29, 31–41
Pts: 25 – Johnson; Rebs: 16 – Lyles; Asts: 3 – Tied (2)	Pts: 24 – Sabol; Rebs: 12 – Oboh; Asts: 6 – Talton Jr.
Game 3

Rocket Arena
Cleveland, OH
Referees: Lucas, Silver, Stewart

ESPN+

March 12
6:30 p.m. EDT

Box score

No. 3 Kent State 86, No. 6 Ohio 75
Scoring by half: 40–38, 46–37
Pts: 27 – Gillespie; Rebs: 8 – Gillespie; Asts: 7 – Medley	Pts: 24 – Hadaway; Rebs: 7 – Tied (2); Asts: 7 – Paveletzke
Game 4

Rocket Arena
Cleveland, OH
Attendance: 9,123
Referees: McNutt, Meeks, Von Sossan

=== Semifinal round ===
CBSSN

March 13
5:00 p.m. EDT

Box score

No. 4 Toledo 77, No. 8 UMass 67
Scoring by half: 43–34, 34−33
Pts: 18 – Wilson; Rebs: 11 – Craig; Asts: 7 – Blyden Jr.	Pts: 21 – Bettiol; Rebs: 6 – Tied (2); Asts: 5 – Carbuccia
Game 1

Rocket Arena
Cleveland, OH
Referees: Barlow, Floyd, Von Sossan

CBSSN

March 13
7:30 p.m. EDT

Box score

No. 2 Akron 75, No. 3 Kent State 68
Scoring by half: 42−28, 33−40
Pts: 18 − Tied (2); Rebs: 9 − Lyles; Asts: 3 − Johnson	Pts: 15 − Whaley Jr. Rebs: 14 − Gillespie; Asts: 3 − Medley
Game 2

Rocket Arena
Cleveland, OH
Attendance: 10,936
Referees: McJunkins, Smith, Stewart

=== Final round ===
ESPN2

March 14
8:00 p.m. EDT

Box score

No. 2 Akron 79, No. 4 Toledo 76
Scoring by half: 30–42, 49−34
Pts: 15 – Tied (2); Rebs: 16 – Lyles; Asts: 5 – Johnson	Pts: 21 – Blyden Jr. Rebs: 7 – Parks; Asts: 8 – Wilson
Championship

Rocket Arena
Cleveland, OH
Attendance: 11,072
Referees: Barlow, Floyd, Smith

== Awards and honors ==
=== All-Tournament team ===
Player	Team
Leonardo Bettiol	UMass
Leroy Blyden Jr.	Toledo
Sean Craig	Toledo
Tavares Johnson (MVP)	Akron
Amani Lyles	Akron

MVP denotes Most Valuable Player

== See also ==
- 2026 MAC women's basketball tournament
