= 2025–26 Northern Illinois Huskies men's basketball team =

American college basketball season

2025–26 Northern Illinois Huskies men's basketball
- Conference: Mid-American Conference
- Record: 9–21 (4–14 MAC)
- Head coach: Rashon Burno (5th season)
- Assistant coaches: Drew Gladstone; Antwon Jackson; Jacob Kurtz; Eric Rwahwire; Eduardo Fernandez
- Home arena: Convocation Center

2025–26 Mid-American Conference men's basketball standings
	Conf.				Overall
Team	W		L	PCT	W		L	PCT
Miami (OH)	18	–	0	1.000	32	–	2	.941
Akron †	17	–	1	.944	29	–	6	.829
Kent State	14	–	4	.778	24	–	10	.706
Toledo	11	–	7	.611	19	–	15	.559
Bowling Green	9	–	9	.500	18	–	14	.563
Ohio	9	–	9	.500	15	–	17	.469
Buffalo	7	–	11	.389	17	–	15	.531
UMass	7	–	11	.389	17	–	16	.515
Ball State	7	–	11	.389	12	–	19	.387
Central Michigan	6	–	12	.333	10	–	21	.323
Western Michigan	4	–	14	.222	10	–	21	.323
Northern Illinois	4	–	14	.222	9	–	21	.300
Eastern Michigan	4	–	14	.222	10	–	21	.323
† 2026 MAC tournament winner

The 2025–26 Northern Illinois Huskies men's basketball team represented Northern Illinois University during the 2025–26 NCAA Division I men's basketball season. The Huskies, led by fifth-year head coach Rashon Burno, played their home games at the Convocation Center in DeKalb, Illinois as members of the Mid-American Conference (MAC). They finished the season 9–21, 4–14 in MAC play, to finish in a three way tie for last place. They failed to qualify for the MAC tournament.

On March 8, 2026, the school announced it had parted ways with head coach Rashon Burno. On March 17, the school named Northern Michigan head coach Matt Majkrzak the team's new head coach.

== Previous season ==
The Huskies finished the 2024–25 season 6–25, 2–16 in MAC play, to finish in last place. They failed to qualify for the MAC tournament.

== Offseason ==
=== Departures ===
Departures
Name	Number	Pos.	Height	Weight	Year	Hometown	Reason for departure
Dominic Gooden	0	G	6' 5"	180	Junior	Cleveland, OH	Transferred to Minnesota State–Moorhead
Quentin Jones	1	G	6' 5"	180	Sophomore	Chicago, IL	Transferred to Saint Louis
Tsvet Sotirov	2	F	6' 9"	210	RS Freshman	Rolling Meadows, IL	Transferred to Georgia Southern
Joe Munden Jr.	3	G	6' 4"	199	Graduate Student	Harlem, NY	Graduated
Oluwasegun Durosinmi	4	F	6' 9"	243	Senior	Lagos, Nigeria	Graduated
Kailon Nicholls	5	G	6' 0"	160	Sophomore	Toronto, ON	Transferred to Angelo State
Nasir Muhammad	7	G	6' 2"	186	Sophomore	Brooklyn, NY	Transferred to Albany
Jayden Mott	11	F	6' 8"	210	Freshman	Midwest City, OK	Transferred to Central Connecticut
Peyton Ackerman	12	G	5' 10"	150	RS Sophomore	Oklahoma City, OK	Transferred to Oklahoma City
James Dent Jr.	14	G	6' 5"	170	Senior	Springfield, IL	Transferred to Middle Tennessee
Ethan Butler	15	F	6' 7"	220	Junior	Toronto, ON	Transferred to Charlotte
Leo Amari IV	20	G	6' 2"	170	Sophomore	Sherman Oaks, CA	Transferred to Evansville
David Mack	21	G	5' 10"	160	Freshman	Los Angeles, CA	Transferred to Cerritos
Steven Tipton	22	G	6' 2"	183	Junior	Brookfield, WI	Transferred to Western Illinois
Mo Sall	23	G	6' 5"	185	Junior	Downers Grove, IL	Transferred to Roosevelt
Quaran McPherson	24	G	6' 4"	197	RS Junior	South Jamaica, NY	Transferred to UAB

=== Incoming transfers ===
Incoming transfers
Name	Number	Pos.	Height	Weight	Year	Hometown	Previous school
Gianni Cobb	0	G	6' 0"	150	Sophomore	Chicago, IL	Columbia
Makhai Valentine	1	G	6' 3"	190	Sophomore	Munhall, PA	Missouri State
Daemar Kelly	3	G	6' 5"	195	Junior	Pittsburgh, PA	St. Francis (PA)
JJ Taylor	4	F	6' 8"	196	Junior	Chicago, IL	Central Florida
Hassan 'Tre' Washington	7	F	6' 8"	240	Junior	Providence, RI	Monroe University
Jao Ituka	10	G	6' 1"	196	Junior	Gaithersburg, MD	Jacksonville State
Isaiah Washington	11	G	6' 5"	185	RS Freshman	Fayetteville, NC	UNC Greensboro
Lataevyon Taylor	15	G	6' 0"	160	Sophomore	Chicago, IL	Western Oklahoma State
Jaylen Wharton	23	F	6' 9"	200	RS Junior	Plant City, FL	South Florida

== Preseason ==
On October 21, 2025 the MAC released the preseason coaches poll. Northern Illinois was picked to finish last in the MAC regular season.

=== Preseason rankings ===
MAC preseason poll
Predicted finish	Team	Votes (1st place)
1	Akron	143 (11)
2	Miami (OH)	133 (2)
3	Kent State	122
4	Ohio	108
5	UMass	98
6	Toledo	95
7	Bowling Green	73
8	Ball State	62
9	Eastern Michigan	52
10	Western Michigan	46
11	Buffalo	37
12	Central Michigan	31
13	Northern Illinois	14

MAC Tournament Champions: Akron (8), Miami (2), Kent State (1), Ohio (1), UMass (1)

== Roster ==
2025–26 Northern Illinois Huskies men's basketball team
Players
Coaches

Pos.	#	Name	Height	Weight	Year	Previous school	Hometown
G	0	Gianni Cobb	6 ft 0 in (1.83 m)	150 lb (68 kg)	So	Columbia	Chicago, IL
G	1	Makhai Valentine	6 ft 3 in (1.91 m)	190 lb (86 kg)	So	Missouri State	Munhall, PA
G	2	Carlos Coronado	6 ft 5 in (1.96 m)	160 lb (73 kg)	Fr	Supreme Academy	Coolidge, AZ
G	3	Daemar Kelly	6 ft 5 in (1.96 m)	195 lb (88 kg)	Jr	Saint Francis (PA)	Pittsburgh, PA
F	4	JJ Taylor	6 ft 8 in (2.03 m)	196 lb (89 kg)	Jr	Central Florida	Chicago, IL
G	6	Taj Walters	6 ft 5 in (1.96 m)	220 lb (100 kg)	Fr	Moravian Prep	Bronx, NY
F	7	Hassan 'Tre' Washington	6 ft 8 in (2.03 m)	240 lb (109 kg)	Jr	Monroe University	Providence, RI
F	8	Ladji Kante	6 ft 7 in (2.01 m)	190 lb (86 kg)	Fr	–	Marseille, France
G	10	Jao Ituka	6 ft 1 in (1.85 m)	196 lb (89 kg)	Jr	Jacksonville State	Gaithersburg, MD
G	11	Isaiah Washington	6 ft 5 in (1.96 m)	185 lb (84 kg)	RS Fr	UNC Greensboro	Fayetteville, NC
G	15	Lataevyon Taylor	6 ft 0 in (1.83 m)	160 lb (73 kg)	So	Western Oklahoma	Chicago, IL
G/F	16	Isaiah Stewart	6 ft 6 in (1.98 m)	190 lb (86 kg)	Fr	Big Tyme Prep	Rockwall, TX
G	21	Max Laskey	6 ft 5 in (1.96 m)	195 lb (88 kg)	Fr	IMG Academy	Birmingham, MI
F	23	Jaylen Wharton	6 ft 9 in (2.06 m)	200 lb (91 kg)	RS Jr	South Florida	Plant City, FL
G	25	Dylan Ducommun	6 ft 4 in (1.93 m)	190 lb (86 kg)	Fr	–	Geneva, Switzerland
F	96	Gustav Winther	6 ft 10 in (2.08 m)	200 lb (91 kg)	Fr	–	Roskilde, Denmark

Head coach

- Rashon Burno (DePaul)

Assistant coach(es)

- Drew Gladstone (DePaul)
- Antwon Jackson (Pikeville)
- Jacob Kurtz (Florida)
- Eric Rwahwire (UC Riverside)
- Eduardo Fernandez (UTEP)

Legend

- (C) Team captain
- (S) Suspended
- (I) Ineligible
- (W) Walk-on
- Injured
- Current redshirt

Roster
Last update: November 29, 2025

== Schedule and results ==
Date time, TV	Rank^{#}	Opponent^{#}	Result	Record	High points	High rebounds	High assists	Site (attendance) city, state
Exhibition
October 28, 2025*; 7:00 p.m.		Quincy	W 82–68	–	14 – JJ Taylor	5 – Tied	9 – Cobb	Convocation Center (691); Dekalb, IL
Regular season
November 3, 2025*; 7:00 p.m., ESPN+		Louisiana–Monroe; MAC-SBC Challenge	W 102–82	1–0	19 – Ituka	10 – Winther	10 – Cobb	Convocation Center (1,071); Dekalb, IL
November 7, 2025*; 7:30 p.m., BTN		at No. 24 Wisconsin	L 72–97	1–1	17 – JJ Taylor	5 – Ituka	3 – Cobb	Kohl Center (15,222); Madison, WI
November 10, 2025*; 8:00 p.m., MW Network		at Grand Canyon	L 59–88	1–2	12 – Kelly	4 – Valentine	3 – Kelly	Global Credit Union Arena (7,008); Phoenix, AZ
November 13, 2025*; 7:00 p.m., ESPN+		Benedictine	W 117–62	2–2	18 – Kelly	7 – Valentine	5 – Cobb	Convocation Center (876); DeKalb, IL
November 18, 2025*; 7:00 p.m., ESPN+		at Northern Iowa; Acrisure Series on-campus game	L 57–70	2–3	12 – Ducommun	5 – Valentine	7 – Ducommun	McLeod Center (3,283); Cedar Falls, IA
November 21, 2025*; 7:00 p.m., Marquee		at Loyola Chicago; Acrisure Series on-campus game	W 76–59	3–3	24 – Ducommun	10 – Walters	6 – Ducommun	Joseph J. Gentile Arena (2,862); Chicago, IL
November 25, 2025*; 7:00 p.m., ESPN+		at Austin Peay; Acrisure Series on-campus game	L 59–77	3–4	12 – Cobb	4 – Kelly	2 – Cobb	F&M Bank Arena (1,833); Clarksville, TN
November 29, 2025*; 2:00 p.m., ESPN+		Bellarmine	Canceled due to inclement weather					Convocation Center; Dekalb, IL
December 2, 2025*; 7:00 p.m., ESPN+		Lindenwood	L 64–99	3–5	17 – Valentine	5 – Cobb	4 – Ducommun	Convocation Center (824); DeKalb, IL
December 6, 2025*; 7:00 p.m., ESPN+		at Bradley	L 55–84	3–6	17 – Ducommun	8 – Winther	3 – Cobb	Carver Arena (5,750); Peoria, IL
December 13, 2025*; 12:00 p.m., FloCollege		at Elon	L 79–85	3–7	17 – Valentine	10 – Valentine	5 – Kelly	Schar Center (1,092); Elon, NC
December 16, 2025*; 7:00 p.m., ESPN+		East-West	W 112–64	4–7	18 – Ituka	8 – Tied	10 – Cobb	Convocation Center (761); DeKalb, IL
December 20, 2025; 2:00 p.m., ESPN+		Central Michigan	W 74–73	5–7 (1–0)	18 – Ducommun	11 – Winther	4 – Tied	Convocation Center (1,311); DeKalb, IL
December 31, 2025; 12:00 p.m., ESPN+		Buffalo	L 67–81	5–8 (1–1)	19 – Ducommun	6 – Valentine	4 – Ducommun	Convocation Center (1,006); DeKalb, IL
January 3, 2026; 12:00 p.m., ESPN+		at Kent State	L 73–77	5–9 (1–2)	27 – Valetine	11 – Walters	4 – Ducommun	MAC Center (2,081); Kent, OH
January 6, 2026; 7:00 p.m., ESPN+		Toledo	L 61–75	5–10 (1–3)	17 – Ducommun	13 – Walters	3 – Tied	Convocation Center (864); DeKalb, IL
January 13, 2026; 5:30 p.m., ESPN+		at Eastern Michigan	L 59–77	5–11 (1–4)	20 – Valentine	10 – Walters	7 – Cobb	George Gervin GameAbove Center (1,749); Ypsilanti, MI
January 17, 2026; 2:00 p.m., ESPN+		UMass	W 70–68	6–11 (2–4)	27 – Valentine	8 – Walters	6 – Cobb	Convocation Center (1,535); DeKalb, IL
January 20, 2026; 6:00 p.m., ESPN+		at Ohio	L 77–80	6–12 (2–5)	23 – Ducommun	6 – Tied	3 – Kelly	Convocation Center (2,867); Athens, OH
January 24, 2026; 1:00 p.m., ESPN+		at Ball State	L 53–58	6–13 (2–6)	11 – Cobb	7 – Walters	2 – Cobb	Worthen Arena (4,105); Muncie, IN
January 27, 2026; 7:00 p.m., ESPN+		Western Michigan	W 85–65	7–13 (3–6)	21 – Ducommun	8 – Tied	8 – Cobb	Convocation Center (1,003); DeKalb, IL
January 31, 2026; 2:30 p.m., ESPN+		at No. 24 Miami (OH)	L 61–85	7–14 (3–7)	17 – Tied	6 – Ducommun	3 – Kelly	Millett Hall (10,640); Oxford, OH
February 7, 2026*; 1:00 p.m., ESPN+		at Georgia State; MAC-SBC Challenge	W 75–74	8–14	23 – Valentine	8 – Walters	8 – Ducommun	GSU Convocation Center (1,589); Atlanta, GA
February 11, 2026; 7:00 p.m., ESPN+		Bowling Green	L 52–68	8–15 (3–8)	15 – Valentine	6 – Washington	6 – Cobb	Convocation Center (1,251); DeKalb, IL
February 14, 2026; 4:00 p.m., ESPN+		at Central Michigan	L 46–88	8–16 (3–9)	13 – Valentine	6 – Tied	3 – Cobb	McGuirk Arena (1,662); Mount Pleasant, MI
February 17, 2026; 5:30 p.m., ESPN+		at Buffalo	W 72–70	9–16 (4–9)	23 – Cobb	8 – Walters	10 – Ducommun	Alumni Arena (1,802); Amherst, NY
February 21, 2026; 2:00 p.m., ESPN+		Ohio	L 66–74	9–17 (4–10)	15 – Valentine	8 – Walters	6 – Ducommun	Convocation Center (1,245); DeKalb, IL
February 24, 2026; 6:00 p.m., ESPN+		at Toledo	L 69–79	9–18 (4–11)	17 – Tied	7 – Washington	5 – Cobb	Savage Arena (4,531); Toledo, OH
February 28, 2026; 3:00 p.m., ESPN+		Ball State	L 43–79	9–19 (4–12)	9 – Kelly	5 – Washington	3 – Cobb	Convocation Center (1,887); DeKalb, IL
March 3, 2026; 7:00 p.m., ESPN+		Kent State	L 76–102	9–20 (4–13)	17 – Tied	6 – Tied	4 – Cobb	Convocation Center (1,040); DeKalb, IL
March 6, 2026; 5:00 p.m., CBSSN		at Akron	L 55–94	9–21 (4–14)	14 – Tied	5 – Walters	2 – Ducommun	James A. Rhodes Arena (2,768); Akron, OH
*Non-conference game. ^{#}Rankings from AP Poll. (#) Tournament seedings in parentheses. All times are in Central Time.
