= 2025–26 Bowling Green Falcons men's basketball team =

American college basketball season

2025–26 Bowling Green Falcons men's basketball

Fort Myers Tip-Off Palms Division co-champions
- Conference: Mid-American Conference
- Record: 18–14 (9–9 MAC)
- Head coach: Todd Simon (3rd season)
- Associate head coach: Lourawls Nairn Jr. (3rd season)
- Assistant coaches: Bryce Martin (3rd season); Bob Gallager (3rd season); Jason Newkirk (2nd season); Anthony Stacey (1st season)
- Home arena: Stroh Center

2025–26 Mid-American Conference men's basketball standings
	Conf.				Overall
Team	W		L	PCT	W		L	PCT
Miami (OH)	18	–	0	1.000	32	–	2	.941
Akron †	17	–	1	.944	29	–	6	.829
Kent State	14	–	4	.778	24	–	10	.706
Toledo	11	–	7	.611	19	–	15	.559
Bowling Green	9	–	9	.500	18	–	14	.563
Ohio	9	–	9	.500	15	–	17	.469
Buffalo	7	–	11	.389	17	–	15	.531
UMass	7	–	11	.389	17	–	16	.515
Ball State	7	–	11	.389	12	–	19	.387
Central Michigan	6	–	12	.333	10	–	21	.323
Western Michigan	4	–	14	.222	10	–	21	.323
Northern Illinois	4	–	14	.222	9	–	21	.300
Eastern Michigan	4	–	14	.222	10	–	21	.323
† 2026 MAC tournament winner

The 2025–26 Bowling Green Falcons men's basketball team represented Bowling Green State University during the 2025–26 NCAA Division I men's basketball season. The Falcons, led by third-year head coach Todd Simon, played their home games at the Stroh Center in Bowling Green, Ohio as members of the Mid-American Conference.

They finished the 2025–26 season 18–14, 9–9 in MAC play, to finish tied for 5th place. They qualified for the MAC tournament as the 5th seed where they lost in the quarterfinals to Toledo

== Previous season ==
The Falcons finished the 2024–25 season 14–18, 8–10 in MAC play to finish in eighth place. They were defeated by Akron in the quarterfinals of the MAC tournament.

== Offseason ==
=== Departures ===
Departures
Name	Number	Pos.	Height	Weight	Year	Hometown	Reason for departure
Trey Thomas	1	G	6'0"	160	Senior	Toronto, Ontario	Graduated
DaJion Humphrey	3	G	6'4"	185	Senior	Detroit, Michigan	Transferred to Samford
Braelon Green	5	G	6'3"	180	Sophomore	Southfield, Michigan	Transferred to Eastern Michigan
Marcus Johnson	6	F	6'7"	265	Senior	Akron, Ohio	Transferred to Kansas State
Wilguens Jr. Exacte	7	F	6'6"	236	Sophomore	Montreal, Quebec	Transferred to Drake
Derrick Butler	10	G	6'2"	195	Senior	Charlotte, North Carolina	Graduated
Jamai Felt	11	F	6'10"	210	Freshman	Boston, Massachusetts	Transferred to Temple
Youssef Khayat	23	F	6'9"	215	Junior	Beirut, Lebanon	Signed with Sagesse SC
Donovan Hunter	55	F	6'8"	197	Sophomore	Columbus, Ohio	Transferred to Bellarmine

=== Incoming transfers ===
Incoming transfers
Name	Number	Pos.	Height	Weight	Year	Hometown	Previous school
Jason Kimbrough Jr.	1	G	6'0"	165	Junior	Maricopa, Arizona	Highland CC
Josiah Shackelford	4	G	6'4"	212	Sophomore	Sanford, Florida	Flagler
Mayar Wol	9	F	6'8"	196	Junior	Raleigh, North Carolina	Eastern Kentucky
Javon Ruffin	11	G	6'5"	195	Senior	Phoenix, Arizona	Colorado
Troy Glover II	16	F	6'10"	225	Senior	Wheaton, Illinois	UMSL
Justin Thomas	25	G	6'7"	184	Senior	Baton Rouge, Louisiana	Florida State
Aiden Goins	34	F	6'9"	275	Junior	Knoxville, Tennessee	Walters State CC

=== Recruiting class ===
College recruiting information
Name	Hometown	School	Height	Weight	Commit date
Makhi Leach; G	Toledo, Ohio	Whitmer High School	6 ft 2 in (1.88 m)	180 lb (82 kg)	Sep 19, 2024
Makhi Leach; G	Recruit ratings: Rivals: 247Sports: ESPN: (N/A)				
Camden Karel; PF	Byron Center, Michigan	Byron Center High School	6 ft 9 in (2.06 m)	200 lb (91 kg)	Jul 4, 2024
Camden Karel; PF	Recruit ratings: Rivals: 247Sports: ESPN: (N/A)				
Overall recruit ranking: 247Sports: 146 On3: 141
Note: In many cases, Scout, Rivals, 247Sports, On3, and ESPN may conflict in their listings of height and weight.; In these cases, the average was taken. ESPN grades are on a 100-point scale.; Sources: "2025 Team Ranking". Rivals.; "2025–26 Bowling Green Falcons men's basketball team". 247Sports.; "2025–26 Bowling Green Falcons men's basketball team". On3.

== Preseason ==
On October 21, 2025, the MAC released the preseason coaches' poll. Bowling Green was picked to finish third in the MAC regular season.

=== Preseason rankings ===
MAC preseason poll
Predicted finish	Team	Votes (1st place)
1	Akron	143 (11)
2	Miami (OH)	133 (2)
3	Kent State	122
4	Ohio	108
5	UMass	98
6	Toledo	95
7	Bowling Green	73
8	Ball State	62
9	Eastern Michigan	52
10	Western Michigan	46
11	Buffalo	37
12	Central Michigan	31
13	Northern Illinois	14

MAC Tournament Champions: Akron (8), Miami-Ohio (2), Kent State (1), Ohio (1), UMass (1)

=== Preseason All-MAC ===
Preseason All-MAC teams
Team	Player	Position	Year
First	Javontae Campbell	Guard	Senior

== Roster ==
2025–26 Bowling Green Falcons men's basketball team
Players
Coaches

Pos.	#	Name	Height	Weight	Year	Previous school	Hometown
G	0	Jaxon Pardon	6 ft 4 in (1.93 m)	170 lb (77 kg)	So	Carroll High School	Fort Wayne, Indiana
G	1	Jason Kimbrough Jr.	6 ft 0 in (1.83 m)	165 lb (75 kg)	Jr	Highland CC	Maricopa, Arizona
G	2	Javontae Campbell	6 ft 2 in (1.88 m)	185 lb (84 kg)	Sr	Northern Oklahoma	Muskogee, Oklahoma
G	3	Makhi Leach	6 ft 2 in (1.88 m)	173 lb (78 kg)	Fr	Whitmer HS	Toledo, Ohio
G	4	Josiah Shackelford	6 ft 4 in (1.93 m)	212 lb (96 kg)	So	Flagler	Sanford, Florida
F	8	Greg Spurgin	6 ft 7 in (2.01 m)	225 lb (102 kg)	Sr	Westminster	Toowoomba, Australia
F	9	Mayar Wol	6 ft 8 in (2.03 m)	196 lb (89 kg)	Jr	Eastern Kentucky	Raleigh, North Carolina
G	10	Christian Dedivanaj	6 ft 3 in (1.91 m)	170 lb (77 kg)	Fr	Powers Catholic HS	Flint, Michigan
G	11	Javon Ruffin	6 ft 5 in (1.96 m)	195 lb (88 kg)	Sr	Colorado	Phoenix, Arizona
F	12	Mohamed Maxamud	6 ft 10 in (2.08 m)	200 lb (91 kg)	Sr	Labette Community College	Westerville, Ohio
F	13	Preston Squire	6 ft 11 in (2.11 m)	235 lb (107 kg)	Jr	Salt Lake Community College	Ephraim, Utah
F	14	Sam Towns	6 ft 9 in (2.06 m)	200 lb (91 kg)	Sr	Ohio	Columbus, Ohio
F	15	Camden Karel	6 ft 9 in (2.06 m)	220 lb (100 kg)	Fr	Byron Center HS	Byron Center, Michigan
F	16	Troy Glover II	6 ft 10 in (2.08 m)	225 lb (102 kg)	Sr	UMSL	Wheaton, Illinois
G	25	Justin Thomas	6 ft 7 in (2.01 m)	184 lb (83 kg)	Sr	Florida State	Baton Rouge, Louisiana
G	31	Alijah Adem	6 ft 2 in (1.88 m)	160 lb (73 kg)	RS Fr	Spring Valley High School	Las Vegas, Nevada
F	34	Aiden Goins	6 ft 9 in (2.06 m)	275 lb (125 kg)	Jr	Walters State CC	Knoxville, Tennessee

Head coach

- Todd Simon (Central Michigan)

Assistant coach(es)

- Lourawls Nairn Jr. (Michigan State)
- Bryce Martin (Boise State)
- Bob Gallager (St. Bonaventure)
- Jason Newkirk (Olivet Nazarene)
- Anthony Stacey (Bowling Green)

Legend

- (C) Team captain
- (S) Suspended
- (I) Ineligible
- (W) Walk-on
- Injured
- Current redshirt

Roster
Last update: December 15, 2025

== Schedule and results ==
Date time, TV	Rank^{#}	Opponent^{#}	Result	Record	High points	High rebounds	High assists	Site (attendance) city, state
Exhibition
October 23, 2025*; 7:00 p.m., BTN+		at No. 22 Michigan State	L 66–75		20 – Towns	12 – Towns	5 – Campbell	Breslin Center (14,797); East Lansing, MI
October 27, 2025*; 7:00 p.m.		at Dayton	L 59–90		20 – Ruffin	5 – Wol	4 – Thomas	UD Arena (13,407); Dayton, OH
Regular season
November 3, 2025*; 7:00 p.m., ESPN+		Texas State; MAC-SBC Challenge	W 83–48	1–0	19 – Wol	7 – Campbell	5 – Campbell	Stroh Center (3,003); Bowling Green, OH
November 6, 2025*; 7:00 p.m., ESPN+		Bethany	W 120–65	2–0	24 – Campbell	6 – Tied	4 – Thomas	Stroh Center (1,813); Bowling Green, OH
November 9, 2025*; 2:00 pm, ESPN+		Le Moyne	W 83–60	3–0	23 – Campbell	7 – Towns	4 – Tied	Stroh Center (1,944); Bowling Green, OH
November 15, 2025*; 6:00 pm, ESPN+		at Davidson	L 87–91	3–1	23 – Shackelford	6 – Tied	6 – Thomas	John M. Belk Arena (2,536); Davidson, NC
November 19, 2025*; 7:00 p.m., ESPN+		William & Mary	L 74–82	3–2	17 – Campbell	8 – Towns	4 – Campbell	Stroh Center (1,848); Bowling Green, OH
November 24, 2025*; 12:00 p.m., PTB Live		vs. Bucknell; Fort Myers Tip-Off Palms Division	W 71–66	4–2	15 – Tied	7 – Thomas	4 – Tied	Suncoast Credit Union Arena (682); Fort Myers, FL
November 26, 2025*; 11:00 a.m., PTB Live		vs. VMI; Fort Myers Tip-Off Palms Division	W 81–48	5–2	21 – Wol	18 – Towns	5 – Kimbrough Jr.	Suncoast Credit Union Arena (680); Fort Myers, FL
December 1, 2025*; 8:00 p.m., ESPN+		at Kansas State	W 82–66	6–2	27 – Towns	8 – Tied	5 – Campbell	Bramlage Coliseum (6,917); Manhattan, KS
December 6, 2025*; 1:00 pm, ESPN+		Utah Valley	L 71–82	6–3	24 – Campbell	6 – Towns	5 – Campbell	Stroh Center (1,929); Bowling Green, OH
December 7, 2025*; 4:00 p.m., ESPN+		Aquinas	W 131–50	7–3	24 – Goins	7 – Campbell	9 – Campbell	Stroh Center (1,720); Bowling Green, OH
December 16, 2025*; 7:00 p.m., ESPN+		Chicago State	W 76–55	8–3	19 – Towns	11 – Towns	9 – Ruffin	Stroh Center (1,715); Bowling Green, OH
December 20, 2025; 4:00 p.m., ESPN+		at Ohio	W 68–58	9–3 (1–0)	19 – Campbell	8 – Towns	7 – Campbell	Convocation Center (3,035); Athens, OH
December 22, 2025*; 2:00 p.m., ESPN+		Siena Heights	W 125–66	10–3	21 – Shackelford	7 – Campbell	9 – Thomas	Stroh Center (1,829); Bowling Green, OH
December 30, 2025; 7:00 p.m., ESPN+		Miami (OH)	L 83–93	10–4 (1–1)	24 – Towns	6 – Towns	4 – Campbell	Stroh Center (3,844); Bowling Green, OH
January 3, 2026; 2:00 p.m., ESPN+		at UMass	W 101–100 ^{OT}	11–4 (2–1)	47 – Campbell	8 – Towns	8 – Campbell	Mullins Center (2,574); Amherst, MA
January 6, 2026; 7:00 p.m., ESPN+		at Kent State	L 93–96	11–5 (2–2)	28 – Campbell	8 – Glover II	9 – Campbell	MAC Center (1,688); Kent, OH
January 9, 2026; 8:00 p.m., CBSSN		Akron	L 67–77	11–6 (2–3)	32 – Wol	9 – Glover II	5 – Campbell	Stroh Center (2,272); Bowling Green, OH
January 17, 2026; 1:00 p.m., ESPN+		Eastern Michigan	W 85–79	12–6 (3–3)	25 – Wol	10 – Glover II	5 – Campbell	Stroh Center (2,347); Bowling Green, OH
January 20, 2026; 7:00 p.m., ESPN+		at Western Michigan	W 72–54	13–6 (4–3)	21 – Towns	9 – Tied	7 – Campbell	University Arena (1,086); Kalamazoo, MI
January 24, 2026; 5:00 p.m., ESPN+		at Toledo	L 72–73	13–7 (4–4)	29 – Campbell	7 – Tied	8 – Campbell	Savage Arena (6,850); Toledo, OH
January 27, 2026; 7:00 p.m., ESPN+		Buffalo	L 78–89	13–8 (4–5)	31 – Campbell	10 – Glover II	7 – Campbell	Stroh Center (2,298); Bowling Green, OH
January 31, 2026; 7:00 p.m., ESPN+		at Central Michigan	L 59–62	13–9 (4–6)	21 – Campbell	8 – Shackelford	4 – Campbell	McGuirk Arena (5,352); Mount Pleasant, MI
February 3, 2026; 7:00 p.m., ESPN+		Ball State	W 77–52	14–9 (5–6)	21 – Shackelford	7 – Glover II	6 – Campbell	Stroh Center (1,771); Bowling Green, OH
February 7, 2026*; 3:00 p.m., ESPN+		at Arkansas State; MAC-SBC Challenge	L 54–91	14–10	13 – Tied	6 – Tied	4 – Campbell	First National Bank Arena (3,570); Jonesboro, AR
February 11, 2026; 8:00 p.m., ESPN+		at Northern Illinois	W 68–52	15–10 (6–6)	15 – Wol	9 – Towns	5 – Campbell	Convocation Center (1,251); DeKalb, IL
February 14, 2026; 5:00 p.m., ESPN+		Toledo	W 80–70	16–10 (7–6)	19 – Campbell	7 – Shackelford	5 – Campbell	Stroh Center (4,167); Bowling Green, OH
February 17, 2026; 7:00 p.m., ESPN+		Kent State	L 71–78	16–11 (7–7)	22 – Campbell	11 – Towns	4 – Campbell	Stroh Center (2,223); Bowling Green, OH
February 20, 2026; 8:30 p.m., CBSSN		at No. 22 Miami (OH)	L 77–91	16–12 (7–8)	24 – Campbell	6 – Tied	6 – Campbell	Millett Hall (10,127); Oxford, OH
February 24, 2026; 7:00 p.m., ESPN+		Western Michigan	L 79–88	16–13 (7–9)	22 – Towns	9 – Towns	7 – Campbell	Stroh Center (1,969); Bowling Green, OH
February 28, 2026; 2:00 p.m., ESPN+		UMass	W 81–62	17–13 (8–9)	20 – Campbell	15 – Towns	7 – Towns	Stroh Center (2,167); Bowling Green, OH
March 6, 2026; 6:30 p.m., ESPN+		at Eastern Michigan	W 77–69	18–13 (9–9)	22 – Campbell	18 – Towns	7 – Campbell	George Gervin GameAbove Center (2,321); Ypsilanti, MI
MAC tournament
March 12, 2026; 1:30 p.m., ESPN+	(5)	vs. (4) Toledo; Quarterfinals	L 76–77	18–14	16 – Campbell	9 – Towns	4 – Tied	Rocket Arena; Cleveland, OH
*Non-conference game. ^{#}Rankings from AP Poll. (#) Tournament seedings in parentheses. All times are in Eastern.
