= 2025–26 Ball State Cardinals men's basketball team =

American college basketball season

2025–26 Ball State Cardinals men's basketball
- Conference: Mid-American Conference
- Record: 12–19 (7–11 MAC)
- Head coach: Michael Lewis (4th season)
- Associate head coach: Scott Combs (1st season)
- Assistant coaches: Justin Brown (2nd season); Buzzy Caruthers (2nd season); John Clancy (1st season)
- Home arena: Worthen Arena

2025–26 Mid-American Conference men's basketball standings
| | Conf. | | | | Overall |
| Team | W | | L | PCT | W | | L | PCT |
|---|---|---|---|---|---|---|---|---|
| Miami (OH) | 18 | – | 0 | 1.000 | 32 | – | 2 | .941 |
| Akron † | 17 | – | 1 | .944 | 29 | – | 6 | .829 |
| Kent State | 14 | – | 4 | .778 | 24 | – | 10 | .706 |
| Toledo | 11 | – | 7 | .611 | 19 | – | 15 | .559 |
| Bowling Green | 9 | – | 9 | .500 | 18 | – | 14 | .563 |
| Ohio | 9 | – | 9 | .500 | 15 | – | 17 | .469 |
| Buffalo | 7 | – | 11 | .389 | 17 | – | 15 | .531 |
| UMass | 7 | – | 11 | .389 | 17 | – | 16 | .515 |
| Ball State | 7 | – | 11 | .389 | 12 | – | 19 | .387 |
| Central Michigan | 6 | – | 12 | .333 | 10 | – | 21 | .323 |
| Western Michigan | 4 | – | 14 | .222 | 10 | – | 21 | .323 |
| Northern Illinois | 4 | – | 14 | .222 | 9 | – | 21 | .300 |
| Eastern Michigan | 4 | – | 14 | .222 | 10 | – | 21 | .323 |
† 2026 MAC tournament winner

The 2025–26 Ball State Cardinals men's basketball team represented Ball State University during the 2025–26 NCAA Division I men's basketball season. The Cardinals, led by fourth-year head coach Michael Lewis, played their home games at Worthen Arena in Muncie, Indiana as members of the Mid-American Conference. They finished the 2025–26 season 12–19, 7–11 in MAC play, to finish in a three-way tie for 7th place. They failed to qualify for the MAC tournament due to tiebrakers.

== Previous season ==
The Cardinals finished the 2024–25 season 14–17, 7–11 in MAC play, to finish in a tie for ninth place. They failed to qualify for the MAC tournament, as only the top eight teams qualify.

== Offseason ==
=== Departures ===
Departures
| Name | Number | Pos. | Height | Weight | Year | Hometown | Reason for departure |
|---|---|---|---|---|---|---|---|
| Jermahri Hill | 1 | G | 6'5" | 185 | Junior | Bessemer, Alabama | Transferred to George Mason |
| Ethan Brittain-Watts | 2 | G | 6'1" | 205 | Graduate Student | Indianapolis, Indiana | Exhausted eligibility |
| Mickey Pearson Jr. | 3 | F | 6'8" | 205 | (redshirt) Senior | Lincoln, Alabama | Entered the transfer portal |
| Juanse Gorosito | 4 | G | 6'1" | 190 | Junior | Ceres Santa Fe, Argentina | Transferred to San Diego |
| Payton Sparks | 5 | C | 6'10" | 265 | Senior | Winchester, Indiana | Entered the transfer portal |
| Jurica Zagorsak | 12 | G | 6'8" | 235 | Sophomore | Zadar, Croatia | Left team; signed with KK Samobor |
| TJ Burch | 22 | G | 6'1" | 170 | Freshman | Dallas, Texas | Transferred to Wright State |
| Jeremiah Hernandez | 33 | G | 6'5" | 192 | Graduate Student | Chicago, Illinois | Exhausted eligibility |
| Ben Hendriks | 34 | C | 6'10" | 248 | (redshirt) Senior | Mississauga, Ontario | Graduated |
| Zane Doughty | 54 | C | 6'9" | 242 | Sophomore | Indianapolis, Indiana | Left due to personal reasons |

=== Incoming transfers ===
Incoming transfers
| Name | Number | Pos. | Height | Weight | Year | Hometown | Previous school |
|---|---|---|---|---|---|---|---|
| Elmore James IV | 1 | G | 6'3" | 210 | Senior | Cleveland, Ohio | Ohio |
| Davion Hill | 2 | G | 6'2" | 225 | (redshirt) Sophomore | Williamsport, Pennsylvania | Northwest Florida State College |
| Juwan Maxey | 3 | G | 6'0" | 175 | Senior | Detroit, Michigan | Youngstown State |
| Kayden Fish | 4 | F | 6'6" | 245 | (redshirt) Sophomore | Kansas City, Missouri | Iowa State |
| Armoni Zeigler | 5 | G | 6'4" | 200 | Junior | Amityville, New York | Saint Peter's |
| Cam Denson | 7 | F | 6'7" | 215 | Graduate Student | Compton, California | Long Beach State |
| Devon Barnes | 13 | G | 6'1" | 180 | Senior | Hinesville, Georgia | UTEP |

=== 2025 recruiting class ===
College recruiting information
| Name | Hometown | School | Height | Weight | Commit date |
|---|---|---|---|---|---|
| Preston Copeland; PF | Raleigh, North Carolina | Combine Academy | 6 ft 8 in (2.03 m) | 190 lb (86 kg) | Oct 25, 2024 |
| Preston Copeland; PF | Recruit ratings: 247Sports: (NR) | | | | |
Overall recruit ranking:
Note: In many cases, Scout, Rivals, 247Sports, On3, and ESPN may conflict in their listings of height and weight.; In these cases, the average was taken. ESPN grades are on a 100-point scale.; Sources: "2025 Team Ranking". Rivals.

== Preseason ==
On October 21, 2025, the MAC released their preseason poll. Ball State was picked to finish eighth in the conference.

=== Preseason rankings ===
MAC Preseason Poll
| Place | Team | Votes |
|---|---|---|
| 1 | Akron | 143 (11) |
| 2 | Miami (OH) | 133 (2) |
| 3 | Kent State | 122 |
| 4 | Ohio | 108 |
| 5 | UMass | 98 |
| 6 | Toledo | 95 |
| 7 | Bowling Green | 73 |
| 8 | Ball State | 62 |
| 9 | Eastern Michigan | 52 |
| 10 | Western Michigan | 46 |
| 11 | Buffalo | 37 |
| 12 | Central Michigan | 31 |
| 13 | Northern Illinois | 14 |
(#) first-place votes

=== Preseason All-MAC Teams ===
No players were named to either the First or Second Preseason All-MAC Teams.

== Roster ==
2025–26 Ball State Cardinals men's basketball team
Players
Coaches

| Pos. | # | Name | Height | Weight | Year | Previous school | Hometown |
|---|---|---|---|---|---|---|---|
| F | 0 | Jai Anthoni Bearden | 6 ft 7 in (2.01 m) | 185 lb (84 kg) | RS Fr | Sunnyslope High School | Phoenix, Arizona |
| G | 1 | Elmore James IV | 6 ft 3 in (1.91 m) | 210 lb (95 kg) | Sr | Ohio | Cleveland, Ohio |
| G | 2 | Davion Hill | 6 ft 2 in (1.88 m) | 225 lb (102 kg) | RS So | Northwest Florida State College | Williamsport, Pennsylvania |
| G | 3 | Juwan Maxey | 6 ft 0 in (1.83 m) | 175 lb (79 kg) | Sr | Youngstown State | Detroit, Michigan |
| F | 4 | Kayden Fish | 6 ft 6 in (1.98 m) | 245 lb (111 kg) | RS So | Iowa State | Kansas City, Missouri |
| G | 5 | Armoni Zeigler | 6 ft 4 in (1.93 m) | 200 lb (91 kg) | Jr | Saint Peter's | Amityville, New York |
| F | 7 | Cam Denson | 6 ft 7 in (2.01 m) | 215 lb (98 kg) | GS | Long Beach State | Compton, California |
| G | 11 | Kody Clancy | 6 ft 3 in (1.91 m) | 200 lb (91 kg) | So | Scottsburg High School | Scottsburg, Indiana |
| G | 13 | Devon Barnes | 6 ft 1 in (1.85 m) | 180 lb (82 kg) | Sr | UTEP | Hinesville, Georgia |
| G | 20 | Joey Hart | 6 ft 5 in (1.96 m) | 205 lb (93 kg) | Jr | Kentucky | Linton, Indiana |
| F | 23 | Easton Foster (W) | 6 ft 6 in (1.98 m) | 180 lb (82 kg) | Fr | Monroe Central High School | Parker City, Indiana |
| F | 24 | Mason Jones | 6 ft 7 in (2.01 m) | 225 lb (102 kg) | Jr | Valparaiso High School | Valparaiso, Indiana |
| F | 34 | Preston Copeland | 6 ft 9 in (2.06 m) | 215 lb (98 kg) | Fr | Combine Academy | Clayton, North Carolina |
| G | 45 | Alex Farley (W) | 6 ft 1 in (1.85 m) | 177 lb (80 kg) | Fr | Clinton Prairie High School | Rossville, Indiana |

Head coach

- Michael Lewis (Indiana)

Assistant coach(es)

- Scott Combs (Austin Peay)
- Justin Brown (Southwest Baptist)
- Buzzy Caruthers (Hampton)
- John Clancy (Concordia–Chicago)

Legend

- (C) Team captain
- (S) Suspended
- (I) Ineligible
- (W) Walk-on
- Injured
- Current redshirt

Roster
Last update: December 19, 2025

== Schedule and results ==
| Date time, TV | Rank^{#} | Opponent^{#} | Result | Record | High points | High rebounds | High assists | Site (attendance) city, state |
Exhibition
| October 27, 2025*; 7:00 p.m., ESPN+ | | at Purdue Fort Wayne | L 70–84 | – | 18 – Barnes | 7 – James IV | 4 – Hill | Gates Sports Center (1,263); Fort Wayne, IN |
Regular season
| November 3, 2025*; 7:00 p.m., ESPN+ | | Louisiana; MAC-SBC Challenge | W 75–64 | 1–0 | 16 – Hill | 8 – Hill | 5 – Zeigler | Worthen Arena (2,582); Muncie, IN |
| November 7, 2025*; 7:00 p.m., ESPN+ | | Mansfield | W 84–54 | 2–0 | 20 – Zeigler | 9 – Zeigler | 4 – Hill | Worthen Arena (2,605); Muncie, IN |
| November 11, 2025*; 8:30 p.m., BTN | | at No. 24 Wisconsin | L 55–86 | 2–1 | 17 – James IV | 5 – Hill | 5 – Barnes | Kohl Center (13,909); Madison, WI |
| November 15, 2025*; 7:00 p.m., ESPN+ | | Little Rock | L 62−68 | 2−2 | 15 – Zeigler | 5 – Zeigler | 4 – Jones | Worthen Arena (3,015); Muncie, IN |
| November 22, 2025*; 7:00 p.m., ESPN+ | | at Indiana State | L 52−70 | 2−3 | 14 – Barnes | 9 – Denson | 3 – Zeigler | Hulman Center (4,718); Terre Haute, IN |
| November 28, 2025*; 2:00 p.m., ESPN+ | | vs. Monmouth; Lafayette Classic | L 73–80 | 2–4 | 21 – Hill | 6 – Copeland | 6 – Jones | Kirby Sports Center (574); Easton, PA |
| November 29, 2025*; 4:30 p.m., ESPN+ | | at Lafayette; Lafayette Classic | L 37–55 | 2–5 | 11 – Maxey | 8 – Zeigler | 1 – Tied | Kirby Sports Center (1,079); Easton, PA |
| November 30, 2025*; 12:00 p.m., ESPN+ | | vs. Le Moyne; Lafayette Classic | W 96–85 | 3–5 | 27 – Maxey | 16 – Copeland | 5 – Maxey | Kirby Sports Center (347); Easton, PA |
| December 3, 2025*; 8:00 p.m., ESPN+ | | at Evansville | L 52–64 | 3–6 | 17 – Zeigler | 10 – Jones | 3 – Hill | Ford Center (4,186); Evansville, IN |
| December 9, 2025*; 7:00 p.m., ESPN+ | | South Dakota State | L 64–68 | 3–7 | 18 – Hart | 9 – Fish | 5 – Zeigler | Worthen Arena (2,412); Muncie, IN |
| December 14, 2025*; 2:00 p.m., FloCollege | | at Campbell | L 64–69 | 3–8 | 15 – Hart | 10 – Zeigler | 2 – Tied | Gore Arena (1,139); Buies Creek, NC |
| December 20, 2025; 2:00 p.m., ESPN+ | | Miami (OH) | L 77–86 | 3–9 (0–1) | 20 – James IV | 8 – Zeigler | 4 – Barnes | Worthen Arena (3,503); Muncie, IN |
| December 29, 2025*; 7:00 p.m., ESPN+ | | Earlham | W 93–30 | 4–9 | 18 – Copeland | 11 – Jones | 5 – Tied | Worthen Arena (2,309); Muncie, IN |
| January 3, 2026; 2:00 p.m., ESPN+ | | at Buffalo | L 72–85 | 4–10 (0–2) | 20 – Barnes | 6 – Hill | 5 – Jones | Alumni Arena (2,485); Amherst, NY |
| January 6, 2026; 7:00 p.m., ESPN+ | | Eastern Michigan | L 52–74 | 4–11 (0–3) | 15 – Zeigler | 5 – Jones | 4 – Zeigler | Worthen Arena (2,354); Muncie, IN |
| January 10, 2026; 3:30 p.m., ESPN+ | | at UMass | L 71–79 | 4–12 (0–4) | 22 – Hill | 7 – Hill | 6 – Zeigler | Mullins Center (4,010); Amherst, MA |
| January 13, 2026; 7:00 p.m., ESPN+ | | at Akron | L 77–87 | 4–13 (0–5) | 30 – Zeigler | 7 – Denson | 3 – Hill | James A. Rhodes Arena (1,934); Akron, OH |
| January 16, 2026; 8:30 p.m., CBSSN | | Ohio | W 76–71 | 5–13 (1–5) | 28 – Zeigler | 7 – Tied | 4 – Tied | Worthen Arena (2,505); Muncie, IN |
| January 20, 2026; 7:00 p.m., ESPN+ | | at Central Michigan | W 68–67 | 6–13 (2–5) | 17 – Tied | 7 – Zeigler | 4 – Tied | McGuirk Arena (2,202); Mount Pleasant, MI |
| January 24, 2026; 2:00 p.m., ESPN+ | | Northern Illinois | W 58–53 | 7–13 (3–5) | 18 – Tied | 8 – Hill | 3 – Hill | Worthen Arena (4,105); Muncie, IN |
| January 31, 2026; 12:00 p.m., ESPN+ | | at Toledo | L 55–73 | 7–14 (3–6) | 14 – Fish | 9 – Zeigler | 3 – Zeigler | Savage Arena (4,076); Toledo, OH |
| February 3, 2026; 7:00 p.m., ESPN+ | | at Bowling Green | L 52–77 | 7–15 (3–7) | 15 – Hill | 6 – Denson | 3 – Barnes | Stroh Center (1,771); Bowling Green, OH |
| February 7, 2026*; 3:00 p.m., ESPN+ | | at Louisiana–Monroe; MAC-SBC Challenge | W 73–68 | 8–15 | 17 – Fish | 10 – Jones | 4 – Hill | Fant–Ewing Coliseum (1,521); Monroe, LA |
| February 11, 2026; 7:00 p.m., ESPN+ | | Buffalo | L 53–63 | 8–16 (3–8) | 14 – Hill | 5 – Fish | 3 – Tied | Worthen Arena (2,460); Muncie, IN |
| February 14, 2026; 2:00 p.m., ESPN+ | | Kent State | L 68–75 | 8–17 (3–9) | 17 – Hill | 8 – Hill | 4 – Zeigler | Worthen Arena (3,418); Muncie, IN |
| February 17, 2026; 7:00 p.m., ESPN+ | | at Ohio | L 57–69 | 8–18 (3–10) | 17 – Barnes | 10 – Copeland | 3 – Zeigler | Convocation Center (4,164); Athens, OH |
| February 20, 2026; 6:30 p.m., CBSSN | | Akron | L 65–78 | 8–19 (3–11) | 18 – Hill | 11 – Hill | 4 – Zeigler | Worthen Arena (2,680); Muncie, IN |
| February 24, 2026; 7:00 p.m., ESPN+ | | UMass | W 74–73 ^{OT} | 9–19 (4–11) | 26 – Hill | 9 – Copeland | 5 – Zeigler | Worthen Arena (2,396); Muncie, IN |
| February 28, 2026; 4:00 p.m., ESPN+ | | at Northern Illinois | W 79–43 | 10–19 (5–11) | 17 – Hill | 6 – Tied | 7 – Hill | Convocation Center (1,887); DeKalb, IL |
| March 3, 2026; 7:00 p.m., ESPN+ | | at Western Michigan | W 74–71 ^{OT} | 11–19 (6–11) | 28 – Zeigler | 10 – Jones | 8 – Zeigler | University Arena (1,206); Kalamazoo, MI |
| March 6, 2026; 7:00 p.m., ESPN+ | | Central Michigan | W 85–69 | 12–19 (7–11) | 25 – Hill | 7 – Zeigler | 7 – Zeigler | Worthen Arena (2,815); Muncie, IN |
*Non-conference game. ^{#}Rankings from AP Poll. (#) Tournament seedings in parentheses. All times are in Eastern.
