= Fort Myers Tip-Off =

College basketball tournament in Florida

- Sport: College basketball
- Founded: 2018
- Founder: Intersport
- No. of teams: 8
- Country: United States
- Venue: Suncoast Credit Union Arena
- Most recent champions: Michigan State (Men's Beach); Bowling Green & Buffalo (Men's Palms); Missouri (Women's Shell); Georgia (Women's Island)
- Broadcasters: Fox / FS1 (Men's); Ion (Women's)
- Website: Fort Myers Tip-Off

The Fort Myers Tip-Off is a college basketball tournament held in Fort Myers, Florida at Suncoast Credit Union Arena during Thanksgiving week. The men's tournament originated in 2018, and a women's tournament began in 2022.

== Champions ==
=== Men's ===
Year	Division	Champion
2018	(none)	Boston College
2019	(none)	Pittsburgh
2020	(none)	Gonzaga
2021	Beach	Florida (Note: California defeated Southern Utah in the opening round that was included in 2021, who in turn was defeated by Florida in the semifinal, earning the Gators an outright Fort Myers Tip-Off championship.)
2021	Palms	Southern Utah
2022	Beach	Mississippi State
2022	Palms	Sam Houston
2023	Beach	Wisconsin
2023	Palms	Appalachian State
2024	Beach	Michigan (Note: Michigan defeated Miami (Ohio) in the opening round that was included in 2024, securing an outright Fort Myers Tip-Off championship.)
2024	Palms	Miami (Ohio)
2025	Beach	Michigan State
2025	Palms	Bowling Green & Buffalo (Note: Bowling Green and Buffalo each played the same two teams, and not each other, as they are in the same Midwest Athletic Conference (MAC).)

=== Women's ===
Year	Division	Champion
2022	(none)	DePaul (Note: DePaul finished the inaugural season's round-robin tournament in a 2–1 tie with Maryland, but won the tie-breaking head-to-head matchup.)
2023	Island	Indiana
2023	Shell	Marquette
2024	Island	South Carolina
2024	Shell	Michigan
2025	Island	Georgia
2025	Shell	Missouri

== Matchups ==
=== 2026 men's tournament ===
==== Palms Division ====
November 23; PTB Live
Northern Iowa
Davidson

November 23; PTB Live
Charlotte
Florida Gulf Coast

November 23; PTB Live
Tulane
Georgia State

November 25; PTB Live
Northern Iowa
Charlotte

November 25; PTB Live
Tulane
Davidson

November 25; PTB Live
Georgia State
Florida Gulf Coast

==== Beach Division ====
November 24; FS2/BTN
Oklahoma
Pittsburgh

November 24; FS1
DePaul
Purdue

November 26; FOX
Oklahoma
Purdue

November 26; FS1
DePaul
Pittsburgh

=== 2026 women's tournament ===
==== Island Division ====
November 28; Ion
NC State
Kansas State

November 28
Villanova
LSU

November 29
NC State
LSU

November 29
Villanova
Kansas State

==== Shell Division ====
November 28; Ion
Indiana
Mississippi State

November 28
TCU
Georgia Tech

November 29
Indiana
Georgia Tech

November 29
TCU
Mississippi State

=== 2025 men's tournament ===
==== Beach Division ====
November 25; FS2/BTN
11	Michigan State	89
	East Carolina	56

November 25; FS1
16	North Carolina	85
	St. Bonaventure	70

November 27; FS1
St. Bonaventure	67
East Carolina	58

November 27; FOX
11	Michigan State	74
16	North Carolina	58

==== Palms Division ====
November 24; PTB Live
Bucknell	66
Bowling Green	71

November 24; PTB Live
VMI	70
Buffalo	78

November 26; PTB Live
VMI	48
Bowling Green	81

November 26; PTB Live
Bucknell	71
Buffalo	73

=== 2025 women's tournament ===
==== Island Division ====
November 28; Ion
Butler	92
Dayton	66

November 28
Kansas	62
Georgia	68

November 29
Butler	54
Georgia	80

November 29
Kansas	58
Dayton	59

==== Shell Division ====
November 28; Ion
Abilene Christian	59
Northwestern	62

November 28
Missouri	73
Bradley	66

November 29
Abilene Christian	74
Bradley	80

November 29
Missouri	85
Northwestern	70

=== 2024 men's tournament ===
==== Beach Division ====
Semifinals; November 25; FS1
Michigan	75
Virginia Tech	63
South Carolina	66
22	Xavier	75

Beach Championship; November 27; FS1
Michigan	78
22	Xavier	53
Consolation; November 27; FS1
Virginia Tech	60
South Carolina	70

==== Palms Division ====
Semifinals; November 25
Miami (OH)	70
Siena	58
Jacksonville	89
Mercer	90

Palms Championship; November 26
Miami (OH)	75
Mercer	72
Consolation; November 26
Siena	64
Jacksonville	75

=== 2024 women's tournament ===
==== Island Division ====
November 28; Fox
4	South Carolina	76
15	Iowa State	36

November 28
Purdue	49
Middle Tennessee	54

November 30
4	South Carolina	99
	Purdue	51

November 30
	Middle Tennessee	59
15	Iowa State	75

==== Shell Division ====
Semifinals; November 29
Michigan	68
Belmont	58
Virginia Tech	79
Davidson	50

Shell Championship; November 30
Michigan	76
Virginia Tech	65
Consolation; November 30
Belmont	69
Davidson	59

=== 2023 men's tournament ===
==== Beach Division ====
Semifinals; November 20; FS1
Wisconsin	65
24	Virginia	41
West Virginia	58
SMU	70

Beach Championship; November 22; FS1
Wisconsin	69
SMU	61
Consolation; November 22; FS1
24	Virginia	56
West Virginia	54

==== Palm Division ====
November 20
UNC Wilmington	83
Murray State	81

November 21
UNC Wilmington	56
Appalachian State	86

November 22
Appalachian State	67
Murray State	57

=== 2023 women's tournament ===
==== Island Division ====
(missing)

==== Shell Division ====
(missing)

=== 2022 men's tournament ===
==== Beach Division ====
Semifinals; November 21; FS1
Marquette	55
Mississippi State	58
Georgia Tech	64
Utah	68

Beach Championship; November 23; FS1
Mississippi State	52
Utah	49
Consolation; November 23; FS1
Marquette	84
Georgia Tech	60

==== Palms Division ====
(missing)

=== 2022 women's tournament ===
(missing)

=== 2021 men's tournament ===
On June 16, it was announced that the tournament was going to expand to eight teams with two divisions, Beach and Palms.

==== Beach Division ====
Semifinals; November 22; FS1
Ohio State	79
21	Seton Hall	76
California	60
23	Florida	80

Beach Championship; November 24; FS1
Ohio State	68
23	Florida	71
Consolation; November 24; FS1
21	Seton Hall	62
California	59

==== Palms Division ====
Semifinals; November 23
Southern Utah	88
Yale	85
Milwaukee	68
Bowling Green	82

Palms Championship; November 24
Southern Utah	87
Bowling Green	73
Consolation; November 24
Yale	69
Milwaukee	56

=== 2020 men's tournament ===
Semifinals; November 26; FOX/FS1
6	Kansas	90
1	Gonzaga	102
Saint Joseph's	91^{OT}
Auburn	96

Championship; November 27; FOX
Auburn	67
1	Gonzaga	90
Consolation; November 27; FS1
Saint Joseph's	72
6	Kansas	94

=== 2019 men's tournament ===
Semifinals; November 25; FS1
Kansas State	59
Pittsburgh	63
Bradley	51
Northwestern	78

Championship; November 27; FS1
Northwestern	59
Pittsburgh	72
Consolation; November 27; FS1
Bradley	73
Kansas State	60

=== 2018 men's tournament ===
Semifinals; November 19; FS1
25	Loyola Chicago	82
Richmond	66
Boston College	88
Wyoming	76

Championship; November 21; FS1
25	Loyola Chicago	66
Boston College	78
Consolation; November 21; FS1
Richmond	66
Wyoming	88
