= Michael Lewis (basketball coach) =

American basketball coach (born 1977)

Biographical details
- Born: July 27, 1977 (age 49); Jasper, Indiana, U.S.

Playing career
- 1996–2000: Indiana
- 2000–2001: Fort Wayne Fury
- 2000: Florida Sea Dragons
- 2001: Florida Sea Dragons

Coaching career (HC unless noted)
- 2002–2004: Texas Tech (GA)
- 2004–2005: Stephen F. Austin (assistant)
- 2005–2011: Eastern Illinois (assistant)
- 2011–2016: Butler (assistant)
- 2016–2019: Nebraska (assistant)
- 2019–2022: UCLA (assistant)
- 2022–2026: Ball State

Head coaching record
- Overall: 61–64 (.488)

Michael Lewis (born July 27, 1977) is an American college basketball coach and former player who was most recently the head coach at Ball State University. He played in college for the Indiana Hoosiers.

== Playing career ==
Lewis played high school basketball at Jasper High School where he scored 2,138 career points, and was named Gatorade Player of the Year in 1996. In college, Lewis played at Indiana University Bloomington, where he was an all-Big Ten third team selection and ranks second all-time in Indiana history in assists playing for the Hoosiers under Bob Knight.

=== Indiana statistics ===
College	Year	GP	MPG	FG%	3P%	FT%	RPG	APG	SPG	BPG	PPG
Indiana	1996–97	33	20.6	.369	.316	.798	2.2	2.9	0.8	0.0	5.7
Indiana	1997–98	32	24.8	.490	.375	.832	2.5	4.7	0.9	0.1	10.7
Indiana	1998–99	33	24	.518	.349	.789	1.8	4.5	0.7	0.1	11.4
Indiana	1999–00	29	30.9	.519	.379	.774	3.9	5.3	1.3	0.1	10.2

Cited from Sports Reference.

== Coaching career ==
After a brief professional playing career, Lewis began coaching as a graduate assistant under Knight for two seasons at Texas Tech before a one-year assistant coaching stop at Stephen F. Austin. The next six seasons Lewis would be an assistant coach at Eastern Illinois, before accepting a job on Brad Stevens' staff at Butler. He would stay on staff of the Bulldogs for both Brandon Miller and parts of Chris Holtmann's coaching stints before joining Tim Miles on his coaching staff at Nebraska. Lewis would move on to UCLA under Mick Cronin in 2019, and was part of the Bruins' 2021 Final Four team.

On March 25, 2022, Lewis was announced as the new head coach at Ball State.

On March 7, 2026, Ball State fired him after a 12–19 season and a 61–64 overall record in four seasons at the school.

== Head coaching record ==
Record table
Season	Team	Overall	Conference	Standing	Postseason
Ball State Cardinals (Mid-American Conference) (2022–2026)
2022–23	Ball State	20–12	11–7	4th	
2023–24	Ball State	15–16	7–11	9th	
2024–25	Ball State	14–17	7–11	9th	
2025–26	Ball State	12–19	7–11	T–7th	
Ball State:		61–64 (.488)	32–40 (.444)		
Total:		61–64 (.488)			
National champion Postseason invitational champion Conference regular season champion Conference regular season and conference tournament champion Division regular season champion Division regular season and conference tournament champion Conference tournament champion
