= 2025–26 Kent State Golden Flashes men's basketball team =

American college basketball season

2025–26 Kent State Golden Flashes men's basketball

Greenbrier Tip-Off (River Division) champions

NIT, First Round
- Conference: Mid-American Conference
- Record: 24–10 (14–4 MAC)
- Head coach: Rob Senderoff (15th season)
- Assistant coaches: Randal Holt (5th season); Jon Fleming (4th season); Jalen Avery (2nd season); Luke Trondson (2nd season); Tommy Luce (2nd season)
- Home arena: MAC Center

2025–26 Mid-American Conference men's basketball standings
	Conf.				Overall
Team	W		L	PCT	W		L	PCT
Miami (OH)	18	–	0	1.000	32	–	1	.970
Akron †	17	–	1	.944	29	–	5	.853
Kent State	14	–	4	.778	24	–	10	.706
Toledo	11	–	7	.611	19	–	15	.559
Bowling Green	9	–	9	.500	18	–	14	.563
Ohio	9	–	9	.500	15	–	17	.469
Buffalo	7	–	11	.389	17	–	15	.531
UMass	7	–	11	.389	17	–	16	.515
Ball State	7	–	11	.389	12	–	19	.387
Central Michigan	6	–	12	.333	10	–	21	.323
Western Michigan	4	–	14	.222	10	–	21	.323
Northern Illinois	4	–	14	.222	9	–	21	.300
Eastern Michigan	4	–	14	.222	10	–	21	.323
† 2026 MAC tournament winner As of March 18, 2026; Rankings from AP Poll

The 2025–26 Kent State Golden Flashes men's basketball team represented Kent State University during the 2025–26 NCAA Division I men's basketball season. The Golden Flashes, led by 15th-year head coach Rob Senderoff, played their home games at the Memorial Athletic and Convocation Center, also known as the MAC Center, in Kent, Ohio as members of the Mid-American Conference.

They finished the 2025–26 season 14–4 in MAC play, to finish in 3rd place. They qualified for the MAC tournament as the 3rd seed where they defeated Ohio in the quarterfinals before losing to Akron in the semifinals.

Kent State accepted an NIT bid and lost to Illinois State in the first round to finish the year 24–10 overall.

== Previous season ==
The Golden Flashes finished the 2024–25 season 24–12, 11–7 in MAC play to finish in third place. They defeated Western Michigan before losing to Miami (OH) in the semifinals of the MAC tournament. They received an invitation to the NIT, where they defeated St. Bonaventure and Stanford, before falling to Loyola Chicago in the quarterfinals.

== Offseason ==
=== Departures ===
Departures
Name	Number	Pos.	Height	Weight	Year	Hometown	Reason for departure
Jonas Nichols	0	G	6'3"	206	Freshman	Akron, Ohio	Transferred to Northwest Florida State
VonCameron Davis	1	F	6'5"	229	Senior	Columbus, Ohio	Graduated
Marquis Barnett	2	G	6'4"	195	Senior	Saginaw, Michigan	Graduated
Jalen Sullinger	13	G	5'10"	167	Senior	Columbus, Ohio	Graduated; Signed with KKS Polonia Warsaw
Mike Bekelja	15	G	6'0"	184	Graduate student	Solon, Ohio	Graduated
Anthony Morales	22	F	6'8"	195	Graduate student	Boston, Massachusetts	Graduated
Derrick Lee Jr.	41	F	6'5"	205	Freshman	Novi, Michigan	Transferred to Lake Region State College
Cli'Ron Hornbeak	42	C	6'9"	238	Senior	Toledo, Ohio	Graduated
Donovan Hunter	55	F	6'8"	197	Sophomore	Columbus, Ohio	Transferred to Bellarmine
Jaiden Pennicott		G	6'2"	164	Freshman	Ajax, Ontario	Transferred to Palm Beach State College

=== Incoming transfers ===
Incoming transfers
Name	Number	Pos.	Height	Weight	Year	Hometown	Previous school
Rayvon Griffith	0	F	6'8"	205	Sophomore	Cincinnati, Ohio	Cincinnati
Rob Whaley Jr.	2	F/C	6'7"	289	Graduate student	Farmington, Utah	UNLV
Jahari Williamson	25	G	6'1"	193	Graduate student	Pickering, Ontario	Niagara

=== Recruiting class ===
College recruiting information
Name	Hometown	School	Height	Weight	Commit date
Dezmon Briscoe; PF	Indianapolis, Indiana	Crispus Attucks High School	6 ft 8 in (2.03 m)	220 lb (100 kg)	Apr 28, 2025
Dezmon Briscoe; PF	Recruit ratings: Rivals: 247Sports: ESPN: (79)				
Landon Vanderwarker; SG	Delaware, Ohio	Northside Christian School	6 ft 7 in (2.01 m)	200 lb (91 kg)	Nov 13, 2024
Landon Vanderwarker; SG	Recruit ratings: Rivals: 247Sports: ESPN: (N/A)				
Quinn Woidke; G	Westlake, Ohio	Saint Ignatius High School	6 ft 1 in (1.85 m)	170 lb (77 kg)	Nov 13, 2024
Quinn Woidke; G	Recruit ratings: Rivals: 247Sports: ESPN: (N/A)				
Overall recruit ranking:
Note: In many cases, Scout, Rivals, 247Sports, On3, and ESPN may conflict in their listings of height and weight.; In these cases, the average was taken. ESPN grades are on a 100-point scale.; Sources: "2025 Team Ranking". Rivals.

== Preseason ==
On October 21, 2025, the MAC released the preseason coaches' poll. Kent State was picked to finish third in the MAC regular season.

=== Preseason rankings ===
MAC preseason poll
Predicted finish	Team	Votes (1st place)
1	Akron	143 (11)
2	Miami (OH)	133 (2)
3	Kent State	122
4	Ohio	108
5	UMass	98
6	Toledo	95
7	Bowling Green	73
8	Ball State	62
9	Eastern Michigan	52
10	Western Michigan	46
11	Buffalo	37
12	Central Michigan	31
13	Northern Illinois	14

MAC Tournament Champions: Akron (8), Miami-Ohio (2), Kent State (1), Ohio (1), UMass (1)

=== Preseason All-MAC ===
Preseason All-MAC teams
Team	Player	Position	Year
First	Delrecco Gillespie	Forward	Senior

== Roster ==
2025–26 Kent State Golden Flashes men's basketball team
Players
Coaches

Pos.	#	Name	Height	Weight	Year	Previous school	Hometown
F	0	Rayvon Griffith	6 ft 8 in (2.03 m)	205 lb (93 kg)	RS So	Cincinnati	Cincinnati, Ohio
G	1	Cian Medley	5 ft 11 in (1.8 m)	172 lb (78 kg)	Jr	Saint Louis	Sicklerville, New Jersey
F/C	2	Rob Whaley Jr.	6 ft 7 in (2.01 m)	289 lb (131 kg)	GS	UNLV	Farmington, Utah
G	4	Jamal Sumlin	6 ft 1 in (1.85 m)	195 lb (88 kg)	RS Jr	Northwest Florida State College	Cleveland, Ohio
G	5	Brenden Moss	6 ft 4 in (1.93 m)	196 lb (89 kg)	RS Jr	Minnesota Prep	Rockford, Illinois
G	6	Quinn Woidke	6 ft 0 in (1.83 m)	185 lb (84 kg)	Fr	Saint Ignatius High School	Westlake, Ohio
F	7	Landon Vanderwarker	6 ft 8 in (2.03 m)	215 lb (98 kg)	Fr	Northside Christian School	Delaware, Ohio
G	8	Morgan Safford	6 ft 4 in (1.93 m)	217 lb (98 kg)	GS	Miami (OH)	Columbus, Ohio
F/C	11	Dezmon Briscoe	6 ft 8 in (2.03 m)	219 lb (99 kg)	Fr	Crispus Attucks High School	Indianapolis, Indiana
F	14	Magnus Entenmann	6 ft 9 in (2.06 m)	227 lb (103 kg)	GS	International Sports Academy	Columbus, Ohio
F	21	Deandre Jones	6 ft 11 in (2.11 m)	211 lb (96 kg)	RS Fr	Garfield Heights High School	Cleveland, Ohio
F	22	Jaymen Townsend	6 ft 5 in (1.96 m)	220 lb (100 kg)	Fr	Victory Rock Prep	Marion, Indiana
F	23	Delrecco Gillespie	6 ft 8 in (2.03 m)	230 lb (104 kg)	Sr	East Coweta High School	Benton Harbor, Michigan
G	25	Jahari Williamson	6 ft 1 in (1.85 m)	193 lb (88 kg)	Jr	Niagara	Pickering, Ontario
G	31	Dylan Lakatos	5 ft 11 in (1.8 m)	138 lb (63 kg)	Fr	North Royalton High School	Broadview Heights, Ohio
F	51	Drew Huffman	6 ft 6 in (1.98 m)	225 lb (102 kg)	RS Fr	Cuyahoga Falls High School	Cuyahoga Falls, Ohio
G	54	Omer Hamama	6 ft 2 in (1.88 m)	190 lb (86 kg)	Fr	Hapoel HaEmek	Rishon LeZion, Israel

Head coach

- Rob Senderoff (Albany)

Assistant coach(es)

- Randal Holt (Kent State)
- Jon Fleming (Kent State)
- Jalen Avery (Kent State)
- Luke Trondson (Ohio State)
- Tommy Luce (Purdue)

Legend

- (C) Team captain
- (S) Suspended
- (I) Ineligible
- (W) Walk-on
- Injured
- Current redshirt

Roster
Last update: December 9, 2025

== Schedule and results ==
Date time, TV	Rank^{#}	Opponent^{#}	Result	Record	High points	High rebounds	High assists	Site (attendance) city, state
Regular season
November 3, 2025*; 7:00 p.m., ESPN+		Troy; MAC-SBC Challenge	L 97–103 ^{OT}	0–1	22 – Gillespie	16 – Gillespie	4 – Hamama	MAC Center (2,131); Kent, OH
November 7, 2025*; 7:00 p.m., ESPN+		Cornell	W 110–102	1–1	34 – Safford	10 – Gillespie	10 – Hamama	MAC Center (1,870); Kent, OH
November 10, 2025*; 7:00 p.m., ESPN+		UNC Wilmington	W 86–77	2–1	19 – Medley	12 – Gillespie	10 – Medley	MAC Center (2,435); Kent, OH
November 15, 2025*; 1:00 p.m., PTB Live		vs. Cleveland State; Greenbrier Tip-Off (River Division) Semifinal	W 102–95	3–1	30 – Gillespie	13 – Gillespie	8 – Medley	Colonial Hall; White Sulphur Springs, WV
November 16, 2025*; 12:00 p.m., PTB Live		vs. Wright State; Greenbrier Tip-Off (River Division) Final	W 76–72 ^{OT}	4–1	26 – Gillespie	17 – Gillespie	7 – Medley	Colonial Hall (459); White Sulphur Springs, WV
November 18, 2025*; 7:00 p.m., ESPN+		Eastern Kentucky	W 93–78	5–1	25 – Gillespie	11 – Gillespie	6 – Medley	MAC Center (1,802); Kent, OH
November 22, 2025*; 2:00 p.m., ESPN+		Cleveland State	W 91–71	6–1	21 – Medley	11 – Gillespie	6 – Safford	MAC Center (2,026); Kent, OH
November 29, 2025*; 7:00 p.m., Boxcast		Penn State Shenango	W 123–59	7–1	19 – Jones	12 – Gillespie	16 – Medley	MAC Center (1,435); Kent, OH
December 3, 2025*; 7:00 p.m., ESPN+		Austin Peay	W 96–84	8–1	22 – Gillespie	10 – Gillespie	8 – Medley	MAC Center (1,642); Kent, OH
December 6, 2025*; 4:00 p.m., Boxcast		Roberts Wesleyan	W 111–68	9–1	22 – Safford	8 – Griffith	5 – Medley	MAC Center (1,720); Kent, OH
December 14, 2025*; 5:00 p.m., KUNP/ESPN+		at Portland	L 78–88	9–2	21 – Gillespie	14 – Gillespie	4 – Tied	Chiles Center (1,033); Portland, OR
December 20, 2025; 2:00 p.m., ESPN+		at UMass	W 69–59	10–2 (1–0)	19 – Woidke	20 – Gillespie	8 – Medley	Mullins Center (3,104); Amherst, MA
December 29, 2025*; 7:00 p.m., B1G+		at No. 5 Purdue	L 60–101	10–3	10 – Tied	4 – Tied	3 – Tied	Mackey Arena (14,876); West Lafayette, IN
January 3, 2026; 7:00 p.m., ESPN+		Northern Illinois	W 77–73	11–3 (2–0)	28 – Gillespie	11 – Gillespie	2 – Tied	MAC Center (2,081); Kent, OH
January 6, 2026; 7:00 p.m., ESPN+		Bowling Green	W 96–93	12–3 (3–0)	32 – Gillespie	10 – Gillespie	10 – Medley	MAC Center (1,688); Kent, OH
January 10, 2026; 3:00 p.m., ESPN+		at Central Michigan	L 85–87	12–4 (3–1)	23 – Williamson	23 – Gillespie	8 – Medley	McGuirk Arena (2,022); Mount Pleasant, MI
January 13, 2026; 6:30 p.m., ESPN+		at Buffalo	W 87–81	13–4 (4–1)	20 – Gillespie	15 – Gillespie	12 – Medley	Alumni Arena (1,084); Amherst, NY
January 16, 2026; 6:30 p.m., CBSSN		Toledo	W 87–84	14–4 (5–1)	29 – Gillespie	13 – Gillespie	9 – Medley	MAC Center (2,433); Kent, OH
January 20, 2026; 7:00 p.m., ESPN+		No. 25 Miami (OH)	L 101–107 ^{OT}	14–5 (5–2)	27 – Whaley Jr.	14 – Whaley Jr.	7 – Medley	MAC Center (6,327); Kent, OH
January 24, 2026; 3:30 p.m., ESPN+		at Eastern Michigan	W 76–75 ^{2OT}	15–5 (6–2)	27 – Whaley Jr.	12 – Gillespie	4 – Medley	George Gervin GameAbove Center (2,804); Ypsilanti, MI
January 27, 2026; 7:00 p.m., ESPN+		Ohio	W 72–57	16–5 (7–2)	18 – Safford	12 – Gillespie	8 – Medley	MAC Center (1,571); Kent, OH
January 30, 2026; 6:00 p.m., CBSSN		at Akron	L 52–69	16–6 (7–3)	17 – Gillespie	17 – Griffith	3 – Medley	James A. Rhodes Arena (4,847); Akron, OH
February 3, 2026; 7:00 p.m., ESPN+		at Toledo	W 75–72	17–6 (8–3)	25 – Gillespie	10 – Gillespie	5 – Medley	Savage Arena (4,165); Toledo, OH
February 7, 2026*; 3:00 p.m., ESPN+		at Southern Miss; MAC-SBC Challenge	L 65–66	17–7	15 – Tied	9 – Gillespie	3 – Medley	Reed Green Coliseum (2,734); Hattiesburg, MS
February 11, 2026; 7:00 p.m., ESPN+		Eastern Michigan	W 95–91	18–7 (9–3)	23 – Safford	12 – Gillespie	10 – Medley	MAC Center (2,438); Kent, OH
February 14, 2026; 2:00 p.m., ESPN+		at Ball State	W 75–68	19–7 (10–3)	22 – Gillespie	14 – Gillespie	8 – Medley	Worthen Arena (3,418); Muncie, IN
February 17, 2026; 7:00 p.m., ESPN+		at Bowling Green	W 78–71	20–7 (11–3)	27 – Safford	9 – Griffith	6 – Medley	Stroh Center (2,223); Bowling Green, OH
February 24, 2026; 7:00 p.m., ESPN+		Central Michigan	W 83–81	21–7 (12–3)	17 – Gillespie	11 – Gillespie	6 – Medley	MAC Center (2,124); Kent, OH
February 27, 2026; 8:00 p.m., ESPNU		Akron	L 70–92	21–8 (12–4)	15 – Safford	8 – Gillespie	7 – Medley	MAC Center (6,327); Kent, OH
March 3, 2026; 8:00 p.m., ESPN+		at Northern Illinois	W 102–76	22–8 (13–4)	18 – Tied	7 – Tied	4 – Tied	Convocation Center (1,040); DeKalb, IL
March 6, 2026; 7:00 p.m., ESPN+		Western Michigan	W 86–78	23–8 (14–4)	16 – Williamson	8 – Gillespie	5 – Medley	MAC Center (2,421); Kent, OH
MAC tournament
March 12, 2026*; 6:30 p.m., ESPN+	(3)	vs. (6) Ohio; Quarterfinal	W 86–75	24–8	27 – Gillespie	8 – Gillespie	7 – Medley	Rocket Arena (9,123); Cleveland, OH
March 13, 2026*; 7:30 p.m., CBSSN	(3)	vs. (2) Akron; Semifinal	L 68–75	24–9	15 – Whaley Jr.	14 – Gillespie	3 – Medley	Rocket Arena (10,936); Cleveland, OH
NIT
March 18, 2026*; 8:00 p.m., ESPN+		at (4 WS) Illinois State; First round	L 58–79	24–10	19 – Safford	15 – Gillespie	7 – Medley	CEFCU Arena (2,565); Normal, IL
*Non-conference game. ^{#}Rankings from AP Poll. (#) Tournament seedings in parentheses. WS=Winston-Salem. All times are in Eastern.
