= Northside Christian School =

Northside Christian School may refer to:

- Northside Christian School (Westerville, Ohio)
- Northside Christian School (North Charleston, South Carolina)
