= 2025–26 UMass Minutemen basketball team =

American college basketball season

2025–26 UMass Minutemen basketball
- Conference: Mid-American Conference
- Record: 17–16 (7–11 MAC)
- Head coach: Frank Martin (4th season)
- Associate head coach: Allen Edwards
- Assistant coaches: Brian Steele; Matt Figger
- Home arena: Mullins Center

2025–26 Mid-American Conference men's basketball standings
	Conf.				Overall
Team	W		L	PCT	W		L	PCT
Miami (OH)	18	–	0	1.000	31	–	1	.969
Akron †	17	–	1	.944	29	–	5	.853
Kent State	14	–	4	.778	24	–	9	.727
Toledo	11	–	7	.611	19	–	15	.559
Bowling Green	9	–	9	.500	18	–	14	.563
Ohio	9	–	9	.500	15	–	17	.469
Buffalo	7	–	11	.389	17	–	15	.531
UMass	7	–	11	.389	17	–	16	.515
Ball State	7	–	11	.389	12	–	19	.387
Central Michigan	6	–	12	.333	10	–	21	.323
Western Michigan	4	–	14	.222	10	–	21	.323
Northern Illinois	4	–	14	.222	9	–	21	.300
Eastern Michigan	4	–	14	.222	10	–	21	.323
† 2026 MAC tournament winner As of March 14, 2026; Rankings from AP Poll

The 2025–26 UMass Minutemen basketball team represented the University of Massachusetts Amherst during the 2025–26 NCAA Division I men's basketball season. The Minutemen, led by fourth-year head coach Frank Martin, played their home games at the William D. Mullins Memorial Center in Amherst, Massachusetts as first-year members of the Mid-American Conference.

They finished the 2025–26 season 17–16, 7–11 in MAC play, to finish tied for 7th place. They qualified for the MAC tournament as the 8th seed where they upset previously unbeaten and 20th ranked Miami in the quarterfinals. They lost to Toledo the following day in the semifinal.

== Previous season ==
The Minutemen finished the 2024–25 season 12–19, 7–11 in A-10 play to finish in a tie for tenth place. As a No. 11 seed in the A-10 tournament they lost in the first round to La Salle.

== Offseason ==
=== Departures ===
Name	Number	Pos.	Height	Weight	Year	Hometown	Reason for departure
Jaylen Curry	0	G	6'0"	168	Sophomore	Charlotte, NC	Transferred to Oklahoma State
Nate Guerengomba	2	G	6'4"	216	Freshman	Washington, D.C.	Transferred to Quinnipiac
Marqui Worthy	3	G	6'3"	216	Sophomore	Anaheim, CA	Transferred to UC Riverside
Shahid Muhammad	4	F/C	6'10"	205	Junior	Queens, NY	Transferred to Florida State
Daniel Rivera	5	F	6'6"	215	Senior	San Juan, PR	Transferred to UAB
Rahsool Diggins	7	G	6'2"	190	Senior	Philadelphia, PA	Graduated
Lewis Walker	8	F	6'6"	227	Freshman	Winston-Salem, NC	Transferred to North Carolina A&T
Tarique Foster	12	F	6'8"	185	Sophomore	Bronx, NY	Transferred to Albany
Amadou Doumbia	14	F	6'11"	215	Freshman	Bamako, Mali	Transferred to North Carolina A&T
Akil Watson	23	F	6'9"	185	Sophomore	Middletown, New York	Transferred to Saint Peter's
Malek Abdelgowad	25	F/C	6'10"	220	Senior	Cairo, Egypt	Graduated
John Brigham	35	F	6'9"	213	Freshman	Franklin, MA	

=== Incoming transfers ===
Name	Number	Pos.	Height	Weight	Year	Hometown	Previous School
Leonardo Bettiol	3	F	6'9"	238	Graduate student	Roncade, Italy	Abilene Christian
Isaiah Placide	4	G	6'4"	205	Graduate student	Hampton, GA	Eckerd College
K'Jei Parker	5	G	6'2"	190	Junior	Lakeland, FL	Florida SouthWestern
Donovan Brown	10	G	6'2"	185	Senior	Bolingbrook, IL	Florida Tech
Charles Outlaw	22	F/C	6'9"	217	Junior	Orlando, FL	Trinity Valley Community College
Marcus Banks Jr	24	G	6'3"	200	Graduate student	Hampton, VA	UMBC
Dimitri Clerc	25	F/C	6'10"	270	Junior	Lausanne, Switzerland	Pensacola State

=== 2025 recruiting class ===
College recruiting information
Name	Hometown	School	Height	Weight	Commit date
Danny Carbuccia; PG	White Plains, NY	Archbishop Stepinac High School	6 ft 0 in (1.83 m)	160 lb (73 kg)	Sep 18, 2024
Danny Carbuccia; PG	Recruit ratings: Scout: Rivals: 247Sports: ESPN: (NR)				
Bilal Osman; SF	Preston, WA	Elite Sports Academy	6 ft 7 in (2.01 m)	185 lb (84 kg)	Feb 13, 2025
Bilal Osman; SF	Recruit ratings: Scout: Rivals: 247Sports: ESPN: (NR)				
Donovan Brown; SG	Bolingbrook, IL	Waubonsee Community College	6 ft 2 in (1.88 m)	180 lb (82 kg)	Mar 31, 2025
Donovan Brown; SG	Recruit ratings: Scout: Rivals: 247Sports: ESPN: (NR)				
Marcus Banks Jr. SG	Hampton, VA	Fork Union Military HS	6 ft 3 in (1.91 m)	195 lb (88 kg)	Apr 24, 2025
Marcus Banks Jr. SG	Recruit ratings: Scout: Rivals: 247Sports: ESPN: (NR)				
Overall recruit ranking:
Note: In many cases, Scout, Rivals, 247Sports, On3, and ESPN may conflict in their listings of height and weight.; In these cases, the average was taken. ESPN grades are on a 100-point scale.; Sources: "2025 Team Ranking". Rivals.

== Roster ==
2025–26 UMass Minutemen men's basketball team
Players
Coaches

Pos.	#	Name	Height	Weight	Year	Previous school	Hometown
G	0	Danny Carbuccia	5 ft 11 in (1.8 m)	177 lb (80 kg)	Fr	Archbishop Stepinac High School	White Plains, NY
F	1	Daniel Hankins-Sanford	6 ft 8 in (2.03 m)	236 lb (107 kg)	Sr	South Carolina	Charlotte, NC
F	2	Dwayne Wimbly Jr.	6 ft 6 in (1.98 m)	205 lb (93 kg)	Fr	St. Thomas Aquinas High School	Fort Lauderdale, FL
F	3	Leonardo Bettiol	6 ft 9 in (2.06 m)	238 lb (108 kg)	GS	Abilene Christian	Roncade, Italy
G	4	Isaiah Placide	6 ft 4 in (1.93 m)	205 lb (93 kg)	GS	Eckerd College	Hampton, GA
G	5	K'Jei Parker	6 ft 2 in (1.88 m)	190 lb (86 kg)	Jr	Florida SouthWestern	Lakeland, FL
F	7	Bilal Osman	6 ft 7 in (2.01 m)	190 lb (86 kg)	Fr	Elite Sports Academy	Stockholm, Sweden
G	9	Josh Engel (W)	6 ft 0 in (1.83 m)	169 lb (77 kg)	RS Fr	Ranney School	Manalapan, NJ
G	10	Donovan Brown	6 ft 2 in (1.88 m)	185 lb (84 kg)	Sr	Florida Tech	Bolingbrook, IL
G	11	Jayden Ndjigue	6 ft 4 in (1.93 m)	206 lb (93 kg)	Jr	The Rivers School	Ayer, MA
F	13	Luka Damjanac	6 ft 10 in (2.08 m)	260 lb (118 kg)	So	Wilbraham & Monson Academy	Bosnia & Herzegovina
F/C	22	Charles Outlaw	6 ft 9 in (2.06 m)	217 lb (98 kg)	Jr	Trinity Valley Community College	Orlando, FL
G	24	Marcus Banks Jr.	6 ft 3 in (1.91 m)	200 lb (91 kg)	GS	UMBC	Hampton, VA
F/C	25	Dimitri Clerc	6 ft 10 in (2.08 m)	270 lb (122 kg)	Jr	Pensacola State	Lausanne, Switzerland
G	44	Rollie Castineyra (W)	6 ft 2 in (1.88 m)	187 lb (85 kg)	RS So	Phillips Exeter Academy (NH)	Marblehead, MA

Head coach

- Frank Martin (FIU)

Assistant coach(es)

- Allen Edwards (Kentucky)
- Brian Steele (South Carolina)
- Matt Figger (Eastern Kentucky)

Legend

- (C) Team captain
- (S) Suspended
- (I) Ineligible
- (W) Walk-on
- Injured
- Current redshirt

Roster
Last update: October 7, 2025

== Schedule and results ==
Date time, TV	Rank^{#}	Opponent^{#}	Result	Record	High points	High rebounds	High assists	Site (attendance) city, state
Exhibition
October 19, 2025*; 4:00 p.m.		at Brown	W 92–74		24 – Banks Jr.	5 – Damjanac	5 – Carbuccia	Pizzitola Sports Center (484); Providence, RI
October 25, 2025*; 1:00 p.m.		Rhode Island College	W 109–78		22 – Tied	13 – Hankins-Sanford	5 – Tied	Mullins Center; Amherst, MA
Regular season
November 3, 2025*; 7:00 p.m., ESPN+		Marshall; MAC-SBC Challenge	L 72–78	0–1	18 – Banks Jr.	5 – Tied	6 – Parker	Mullins Center (2,256); Amherst, MA
November 8, 2025*; 6:00 p.m., ESPN+		Albany	W 83–62	1–1	23 – Bettiol	10 – Hankins-Sanford	8 – Ndjigue	Mullins Center (3,025); Amherst, MA
November 13, 2025*; 7:00 p.m., ESPN+		Le Moyne	W 94–80	2–1	26 – Banks Jr.	14 – Bettiol	5 – Tied	Mullins Center (2,003); Amherst, MA
November 16, 2025*; 2:00 p.m., ESPN+		Central Connecticut State	W 84–77	3–1	22 – Parker	15 – Bettiol	6 – Carbuccia	Mullins Center (2,743); Amherst, MA
November 21, 2025*; 3:00 p.m., ESPN+		vs. Charleston; Paradise Jam first round	L 65–69	3–2	18 – Banks Jr.	8 – Ndjigue	5 – Bettiol	Sports and Fitness Center (1,224); Saint Thomas, USVI
November 22, 2025*; 3:00 p.m., ESPN+		vs. Green Bay; Paradise Jam consolation semifinal	L 75–79	3–3	21 – Bettiol	8 – Bettiol	5 – Carbuccia	Sports and Fitness Center; Saint Thomas, USVI
November 24, 2025*; 12:30 p.m., ESPN+		vs. Oregon State; Paradise Jam 7th place game	W 73–65	4–3	24 – Hankins-Sanford	11 – Hankins-Sanford	6 – Bettiol	Sports and Fitness Center; Saint Thomas, USVI
December 3, 2025*; 7:00 p.m., ESPN+		Harvard	W 78–71	5–3	29 – Banks Jr.	6 – Ndjigue	13 – Carbuccia	Mullins Center (2,216); Amherst, MA
December 6, 2025*; 4:00 p.m., ESPN+		UMass Lowell	W 80–60	6–3	17 – Banks Jr.	9 – Hankins-Sanford	5 – Parker	Mullins Center (2,442); Amherst, MA
December 10, 2025*; 7:00 p.m., ESPNU		vs. Boston College; MGM Springfield Basketball Hall of Fame Classic	W 76–74	7–3	29 – Banks Jr.	11 – Ndjigue	4 – Tied	MassMutual Center (5,853); Springfield, MA
December 13, 2025*; 12:00 p.m., ACCN		vs. Florida State; Orange Bowl Basketball Classic	W 103–95	8–3	24 – Tied	10 – Hankins-Sanford	8 – Carbuccia	Amerant Bank Arena; Sunrise, FL
December 20, 2025; 2:00 p.m., ESPN+		Kent State	L 59–69	8–4 (0–1)	14 – Bettiol	12 – Hankins-Sanford	4 – Carbuccia	Mullins Center (3,104); Amherst, MA
December 22, 2025*; 12:00 p.m., ESPN+		UMass Boston	W 91–40	9–4	20 – Bettiol	12 – Damjanac	5 – Carbuccia	Mullins Center (2,014); Amherst, MA
December 30, 2025; 7:30 p.m., ESPN+		at Eastern Michigan	L 74–80	9–5 (0–2)	18 – Hankins-Sanford	11 – Hankins-Sanford	6 – Carbuccia	George Gervin GameAbove Center (2,860); Ypsilanti, MI
January 3, 2026; 2:00 p.m., ESPN+		Bowling Green	L 100–101 ^{OT}	9–6 (0–3)	32 – Bettiol	14 – Bettiol	9 – Carbuccia	Mullins Center (2,574); Amherst, MA
January 6, 2026; 6:00 p.m., CBSSN		at Ohio	L 83–86	9–7 (0–4)	16 – Hankins-Sanford	9 – Tied	8 – Carbuccia	Convocation Center (2,699); Athens, OH
January 10, 2026; 3:30 p.m., ESPN+		Ball State	W 79–71	10–7 (1–4)	20 – Bettiol	10 – Hankins-Sanford	6 – Carbuccia	Mullins Center (4,010); Amherst, MA
January 13, 2026; 7:00 p.m., ESPN+		at Western Michigan	W 85–82	11–7 (2–4)	22 – Banks Jr.	8 – Bettiol	9 – Carbuccia	University Arena (1,536); Kalamazoo, MI
January 17, 2026; 3:00 p.m., ESPN+		at Northern Illinois	L 68–70	11–8 (2–5)	25 – Bettiol	7 – Bettiol	3 – Tied	Convocation Center (1,535); DeKalb, IL
January 20, 2026; 6:00 p.m., ESPN+		Toledo	W 84–82	12–8 (3–5)	20 – Bettiol	11 – Hankins-Sanford	9 – Carbuccia	Mullins Center (2,507); Amherst, MA
January 23, 2026; 7:00 p.m., CBSSN		at Buffalo	W 68–67	13–8 (4–5)	19 – Banks Jr.	10 – Hankins-Sanford	6 – Carbuccia	Alumni Arena (2,310); Amherst, NY
January 27, 2026; 9:00 p.m., ESPNU		at No. 24 Miami (OH)	L 84–86	13–9 (4–6)	22 – Bettiol	16 – Bettiol	6 – Carbuccia	Millett Hall (9,223); Oxford, OH
January 31, 2026; 6:00 p.m., ESPN+		Eastern Michigan	W 70–67	14–9 (5–6)	20 – Bettiol	10 – Bettiol	6 – Carbuccia	Mullins Center (4,753); Amherst, MA
February 3, 2026; 7:00 p.m., ESPN+		Central Michigan	W 95–89	15–9 (6–6)	37 – Banks Jr.	9 – Hankins-Sanford	17 – Carbuccia	Mullins Center (2,243); Amherst, MA
February 7, 2026*; 1:00 p.m., ESPN+		at Coastal Carolina; MAC-SBC Challenge	L 91–94 ^{3OT}	15–10	31 – Parker	20 – Hankins-Sanford	5 – Carbuccia	HTC Center (1,924); Conway, SC
February 13, 2026; 9:00 p.m., CBSSN		at Akron	L 92–99	15–11 (6–7)	20 – Parker	4 – Tied	9 – Carbuccia	James A. Rhodes Arena (2,125); Akron, OH
February 17, 2026; 7:00 p.m., ESPN+		No. 22 Miami (OH)	L 77–86	15–12 (6–8)	19 – Placide	9 – Bettiol	6 – Carbuccia	Mullins Center (7,524); Amherst, MA
February 21, 2026; 6:00 p.m., ESPN+		Buffalo	L 82–86 ^{OT}	15–13 (6–9)	24 – Banks Jr.	8 – Bettiol	8 – Carbuccia	Mullins Center (5,096); Amherst, MA
February 24, 2026; 7:00 p.m., ESPN+		at Ball State	L 73–74 ^{OT}	15–14 (6–10)	19 – Placide	14 – Bettiol	5 – Carbuccia	Worthen Arena (2,396); Muncie, IN
February 28, 2026; 2:00 p.m., ESPN+		at Bowling Green	L 62–81	15–15 (6–11)	24 – Bettiol	9 – Bettiol	4 – Bettiol	Stroh Center (2,167); Bowling Green, OH
March 3, 2026; 7:00 p.m., ESPN+		Ohio	W 94–82	16–15 (7–11)	31 – Banks Jr.	10 – Wimbley Jr.	6 – Parker	Mullins Center (2,115); Amherst, MA
MAC tournament
March 12, 2026; 11:00 a.m., ESPN+	(8)	vs. (1) No. 20 Miami (OH); Quarterfinals	W 87–83	17–15	25 – Bettiol	8 – Tied	8 – Carbuccia	Rocket Arena; Cleveland, OH
March 13, 2026; 5:00 p.m., CBSSN	(8)	vs. (4) Toledo; Semifinals	L 67–77	17–16	21 – Bettiol	6 – Tied	5 – Carbuccia	Rocket Arena; Cleveland, OH
*Non-conference game. ^{#}Rankings from AP Poll. (#) Tournament seedings in parentheses. All times are in Eastern.
