= 2025–26 Illinois State Redbirds men's basketball team =

American college basketball season

2025–26 Illinois State Redbirds men's basketball

Terry's Chocolate ESPN Events Invitational (Imagination Bracket) Champion

NIT, Semifinal
- Conference: Missouri Valley Conference
- Record: 23–13 (12–8 MVC)
- Head coach: Ryan Pedon (4th season)
- Associate head coach: Jason Slay (3rd season)
- Assistant coaches: Andrew Dakich (4th season); Mike Netti (1st season); Jack Betz (1st season)
- Home arena: Doug Collins Court at CEFCU Arena

2025–26 Missouri Valley Conference men's basketball standings
	Conf.				Overall
Team	W		L	PCT	W		L	PCT
Belmont	16	–	4	.800	26	–	6	.813
Bradley	13	–	7	.650	21	–	13	.618
Illinois State	12	–	8	.600	23	–	13	.639
Murray State	12	–	8	.600	20	–	13	.606
UIC	12	–	8	.600	19	–	16	.543
Northern Iowa †	11	–	9	.550	23	–	13	.639
Valparaiso	11	–	9	.550	18	–	15	.545
Southern Illinois	10	–	10	.500	16	–	16	.500
Drake	6	–	14	.300	14	–	19	.424
Indiana State	4	–	16	.200	11	–	21	.344
Evansville	3	–	17	.150	7	–	25	.219
† 2026 MVC tournament winner

The 2025–26 Illinois State Redbirds men's basketball team represented Illinois State University during the 2025–26 NCAA Division I men's basketball season. The Redbirds played their home games on Doug Collins Court at CEFCU Arena in Normal, Illinois as a member of the Missouri Valley Conference (MVC).

== Previous season ==
The Redbirds finished the 2024–25 season 22–14, 10–10 in the Missouri Valley Conference play to finish in a tie for fifth place. As the fifth seed in the MVC tournament, they defeated twelfth seed Missouri State in the opening round but were beaten by fourth seed Belmont in the quarterfinal round.

== Offseason ==
=== Departures ===
Name	#	Pos.	Height	Weight	Year	Hometown	Reason for departure
Dalton Banks	3	G	6'2"	190	Graduate	Eau Claire, WI	Graduated (undrafted; signed with BC Margveti Tbilisi)
Malachi Poindexter	1	G	6'3"	190	Graduate	Mineral, VA	Graduated (undrafted)
Caden Boser	33	F	6'8"	225	Fifth Year	Eau Claire, WI	Graduated (undrafted)
Jordan Davis	5	G	6'4"	205	Fifth Year	La Crosse, WI	Graduated (undrafted)
Nick Feather	31	F	6'8"	280	Freshman	Heyworth, IL	
Cade Norris	2	G	6'4"	205	Freshman	Hilliard, OH	Transferred to Samford

=== 2025 recruiting class ===
College recruiting information
Name	Hometown	School	Height	Weight	Commit date
Nick Allen; C	Bourbonnais, IL	Bradley–Bourbonnais Community HS	6 ft 11 in (2.11 m)	210 lb (95 kg)	Aug 26, 2024
Nick Allen; C	Recruit ratings: Scout: Rivals: 247Sports: (NR)				
Ty'Reek Coleman; G	Aurora, IL	Waubonsie Valley HS	6 ft 1 in (1.85 m)	165 lb (75 kg)	Aug 26, 2024
Ty'Reek Coleman; G	Recruit ratings: Scout: Rivals: 247Sports: (NR)				
Isaac Ericksen; F	Cary, NC	Green Level HS	6 ft 8 in (2.03 m)	200 lb (91 kg)	Aug 26, 2024
Isaac Ericksen; F	Recruit ratings: Scout: Rivals: 247Sports: (NR)				
Mason Klabo; G	Fargo, ND	Davies HS	6 ft 1 in (1.85 m)	170 lb (77 kg)	Sep 16, 2024
Mason Klabo; G	Recruit ratings: Scout: Rivals: 247Sports: (NR)				
Overall recruit ranking:
Note: In many cases, Scout, Rivals, 247Sports, On3, and ESPN may conflict in their listings of height and weight.; In these cases, the average was taken. ESPN grades are on a 100-point scale.; Sources: "2025 Illinois State Signees". Rivals.; "2025 Team Ranking". Rivals.

=== Incoming transfers ===
Name	Pos.	Height	Weight	Year	Hometown	Prior school
Landon Moore	G	6'3"	200	Senior	Bloomington, IL	Butler

== Preseason ==
The Redbirds were picked to finish in first place in the conference's preseason poll.

== Roster ==
2025–26 Illinois State Redbirds men's basketball team
Players
Coaches

Pos.	#	Name	Height	Weight	Year	Previous school	Hometown
F	0	Jack Daugherty	6 ft 8 in (2.03 m)	210 lb (95 kg)	So	Brookfield Central HS	Brookfield, WI
G	1	Landon Moore	6 ft 3 in (1.91 m)	205 lb (93 kg)	Sr	Bloomington HS; Western Reserve Academy; Saint Francis (Pennsylvania); Butler	Bloomington, IL
G/F	2	Isaac Ericksen (redshirt)	6 ft 8 in (2.03 m)	195 lb (88 kg)	Fr	Green Level HS	Cary, NC
G	3	Mason Klabo	6 ft 2 in (1.88 m)	180 lb (82 kg)	Fr	Davies HS	Fargo, ND
G	4	Landon Wolf	6 ft 5 in (1.96 m)	210 lb (95 kg)	RS Sr	Cedar Falls HS; Northern Iowa	Cedar Falls, IA
G	10	Ty'Reek Coleman	6 ft 2 in (1.88 m)	175 lb (79 kg)	Fr	Waubonsie Valley HS	Aurora, IL
G	11	Johnny Kinziger	5 ft 11 in (1.8 m)	170 lb (77 kg)	Jr	De Pere HS	De Pere, WI
F	12	Brandon Lieb	7 ft 1 in (2.16 m)	250 lb (113 kg)	GS	Deerfield HS; Illinois	Deerfield, IL
G	13	Ty Blake (W)	6 ft 4 in (1.93 m)	190 lb (86 kg)	Jr	University HS	Normal, IL
G	14	Boden Skunberg	6 ft 5 in (1.96 m)	210 lb (95 kg)	GS	Jamestown HS; North Dakota State	Jamestown, ND
F	15	Nick Allen (redshirt)	6 ft 10 in (2.08 m)	230 lb (104 kg)	Fr	Bradley–Bourbonnais Community HS	Bourbonnais, IL
G	22	Ty Pence	6 ft 6 in (1.98 m)	205 lb (93 kg)	Jr	St. Joseph-Ogden HS	St. Joseph, IL
F	23	Cameron Barnes	6 ft 10 in (2.08 m)	205 lb (93 kg)	RS So	Duncanville HS; Mississippi	Duncanville, TX
F	35	Chase Walker	6 ft 9 in (2.06 m)	280 lb (127 kg)	Jr	Saint Charles Preparatory School	Columbus, OH

Head coach

- Ryan Pedon (Wooster)

Assistant coach(es)

- Jason Slay (West Virginia State)
- Andrew Dakich (Michigan)
- Mike Netti (Alvernia)
- Jack Betz (Ohio State)

Legend

- (C) Team captain
- (S) Suspended
- (I) Ineligible
- (W) Walk-on
- (5Y) Fifth-year Senior
- Injured
- Current redshirt

Roster
Last update: October 18, 2025

== Schedule and results ==
Date time, TV	Rank^{#}	Opponent^{#}	Result	Record	High points	High rebounds	High assists	Site (attendance) city, state
Exhibition Season
October 19, 2025*; 2:00 pm, BTN+		at No. 17 Illinois	L 65–92		16 – Daugherty	4 – Coleman	3 – Tied	State Farm Center (15,180); Champaign, IL
October 29, 2025*; 7:00 pm, BTN+		at Northwestern	L 65–100		13 – Walker	5 – Tied	4 – Walker	Welsh–Ryan Arena; Evanston, IL
Non-Conference Regular Season
November 6, 2025*; 6:00 pm, ESPN+		at Ohio	L 68–72	0–1	15 – Tied	7 – Tied	3 – Tied	Convocation Center (3,831); Athens, OH
November 9, 2025*; 1:00 pm, ESPN+		Cornell	W 76–65	1–1	24 – Coleman	10 – Lieb	2 – Tied	CEFCU Arena (4,086); Normal, IL
November 14, 2025*; 6:30 pm, Peacock		vs. USC; Experian Hall of Fame Series: Los Angeles	L 67–87	1–2	16 – Coleman	9 – Walker	2 – Tied	Intuit Dome (7,554); Inglewood, CA
November 16, 2025*; 6:00 pm, ESPN+		at Long Beach State	W 82–80	2–2	19 – Tied	7 – Walker	4 – Pence	Walter Pyramid (1,480); Long Beach, CA
November 20, 2025*; 7:00 pm, ESPN+		Rockford	W 93–48	3–2	14 – Daugherty	10 – Lieb	3 – Coleman	CEFCU Arena (3,127); Normal, IL
November 23, 2025*; 4:00 pm, ESPN+		Coastal Carolina	W 94–42	4–2	16 – Tied	7 – Skunberg	5 – Klabo	CEFCU Arena (3,512); Normal, IL
November 27, 2025*; 12:30 pm, ESPN2		vs. Charlotte; Terry's Chocolate ESPN Events Invitational (Imagination Bracket) semifinal	W 79–69	5–2	22 – Skunberg	10 – Skunberg	4 – Kinziger	State Farm Field House (533); Kissimmee, FL
November 28, 2025*; 2:00 pm, ESPN2		vs. Furman; Terry's Chocolate ESPN Events Invitational (Imagination Bracket) final	W 72–65	6–2	20 – Pence	10 – Pence	4 – Coleman	State Farm Field House (502); Kissimmee, FL
December 3, 2025*; 7:00 pm, ESPN+		Eastern Kentucky	W 89–78	7–2	21 – Kinziger	8 – Skunberg	5 – Tied	CEFCU Arena (4,179); Normal, IL
December 6, 2025*; 7:00 pm, ESPN+		Chicago State	W 95–53	8–2	16 – Tied	11 – Lieb	9 – Walker	CEFCU Arena (3,881); Normal, IL
December 13, 2025*; 4:00 pm, YouTube		vs. Utah State; Salt Lake Slam	L 78–83	8–3	21 – Pence	4 – Pence	5 – Kinziger	Delta Center (2,539); Salt Lake City, UT
Conference Regular Season
December 18, 2025; 8:00 pm, MVC TV/ESPN+		at Southern Illinois	W 75–68	9–3 (1–0)	22 – Pence	8 – Wolf	5 – Walker	Banterra Center (3,923); Carbondale, IL
December 21, 2025; 4:00 pm, Marquee/ESPN+		Indiana State	W 85–65	10–3 (2–0)	18 – Walker	7 – Lieb	4 – Lieb	CEFCU Arena (4,481); Normal, IL
December 29, 2025; 8:00 pm, MVC TV/ESPN+		at Drake	W 73–56	11–3 (3–0)	17 – Walker	6 – Tied	3 – Tied	The Knapp Center (3,592); Des Moines, IA
January 1, 2026; 2:00 pm, ESPN+		Evansville	W 73–47	12–3 (4–0)	22 – Walker	8 – Walker	4 – Tied	CEFCU Arena (5,216); Normal, IL
January 7, 2026; 7:00 pm, ESPN+		at Valparaiso	L 71–77	12–4 (4–1)	20 – Walker	7 – Wolf	3 – Kinziger	Athletics–Recreation Center (1,444); Valparaiso, IN
January 10, 2025; 4:00 pm, ESPN+		UIC	L 59–63 ^{OT}	12–5 (4–2)	15 – Klabo	10 – Walker	5 – Kinziger	CEFCU Arena (4,859); Normal, IL
January 14, 2026; 6:00 pm, ESPN+		at Indiana State	L 89–94	12–6 (4–3)	21 – Walker	4 – Tied	3 – Kinziger	Hulman Center (4,452); Terre Haute, IN
January 17, 2026; 1:00 pm, ESPN2		Bradley; I–74 Rivalry	W 88–62	13–6 (5–3)	23 – Skunberg	11 – Walker	3 – Tied	CEFCU Arena (7,549); Normal, IL
January 21, 2026; 8:00 pm, ESPNU		Northern Iowa	W 59–54	14–6 (6–3)	20 – Skunberg	8 – Skunberg	2 – Kinziger	CEFCU Arena (4,312); Normal, IL
January 24, 2026; 12:00 pm, ESPN+		at Belmont; Rescheduled from January 25 (Winter Storm Fern)	L 69–80	14–7 (6–4)	13 – Kinziger	8 – Walker	5 – Kinziger	Curb Event Center (764); Nashville, TN
January 28, 2026; 8:00 pm, MVC TV/ESPN+		at Murray State	W 70–65	15–7 (7–4)	21 – Walker	8 – Wolf	2 – Tied	CFSB Center (5,553); Murray, KY
February 3, 2025; 6:00 pm, MVC TV/ESPN+		Southern Illinois	L 50–54	15–8 (7–5)	12 – Walker	5 – Tied	4 – Kinziger	CEFCU Arena (4,766); Normal, IL
February 6, 2026; 7:00 pm, ESPN+		Drake	W 86–76	16–8 (8–5)	19 – Coleman	8 – Coleman	4 – Skunberg	CEFCU Arena (5,191); Normal, IL
February 9, 2026; 7:00 pm, ESPN+		at Evansville	L 80–88	16–9 (8–6)	16 – Moore	9 – Wolf	8 – Kinziger	Ford Center (3,059); Evansville, IN
February 12, 2026; 6:00 pm, MVC TV/ESPN+		Valparaiso	W 86–64	17–9 (9–6)	21 – Kinziger	8 – Pence	4 – Pence	CEFCU Arena (3,607); Normal, IL
February 15, 2026; 2:00 pm, ESPN+		at UIC	L 56–83	17–10 (9–7)	12 – Kinziger	5 – Pence	4 – Pence	Credit Union 1 Arena (2,141); Chicago, IL
February 18, 2026; 8:00 pm, ESPNU		Murray State	W 78–61	18–10 (10–7)	22 – Coleman	6 – Wolf	4 – Coleman	CEFCU Arena (4,319); Normal, IL
February 21, 2026; 7:00 pm, ESPN2		at Bradley; I–74 Rivalry	L 60–74	18–11 (10–8)	12 – Tied	7 – Klabo	5 – Kinziger	Carver Arena (10,542); Peoria, IL
February 25, 2026; 6:00 pm, ESPNU		at Northern Iowa	W 71–69	19–11 (11–8)	14 – Tied	8 – Skunberg	5 – Walker	McLeod Center (3,907); Cedar Falls, IA
March 1, 2026; 4:00 pm, CBSSN		Belmont; Senior Day	W 81–74	20–11 (12–8)	16 – Kinziger	5 – Wolf	6 – Kinziger	CEFCU Arena (6,149); Normal, IL
Conference Tournament
March 6, 2026*; 8:30 pm, MVC TV/ESPN+	(3)	vs. (6) Northern Iowa; Arch Madness Quarterfinal	L 52–74	20–12	11 – Walker	6 – Pence	3 – Kinziger	Enterprise Center (8,897); St. Louis, MO
National Invitation Tournament
March 18, 2026*; 7:00 pm, ESPN+	(4 W-S)	(W-S) Kent State; First round	W 79–58	21–12	24 – Wolf	7 – Tied	7 – Kinziger	CEFCU Arena (2,565); Normal, IL
March 22, 2026*; 3:30 pm, ESPN2	(4 W-S)	at (1 W-S) Wake Forest; Second round	W 78–75	22–12	23 – Pence	9 – Skunberg	5 – Kinziger	Lawrence Joel; Veterans Memorial Coliseum (1,933); Winston-Salem, NC
March 25, 2026*; 6:00 pm, ESPN2	(4 W-S)	at (2 W-S) Dayton; Quarterfinal	W 61–55	23–12	16 – Kinziger	10 – Walker	4 – Skunberg	University of Dayton Arena (10,444); Dayton, OH
April 2, 2026*; 8:30 pm, ESPN	(4 W-S)	vs. (1 AU) Auburn; Semifinal	L 66–88	23–13	17 – Coleman	7 – Walker	4 – Skunberg	Hinkle Fieldhouse (4,625); Indianapolis, IN
*Non-conference game. ^{#}Rankings from AP Poll. (#) Tournament seedings in parentheses. W-S=Winston-Salem, AU=Auburn. All times are in Central Time Zone.
