= 2025–26 Ohio Bobcats men's basketball team =

American college basketball season

2025–26 Ohio Bobcats men's basketball
- Conference: Mid-American Conference
- Record: 15–17 (9–9 MAC)
- Head coach: Jeff Boals (7th season)
- Assistant coaches: Lamar Thornton (7th season); Kyle Barlow (7th season); Lee Martin (6th season); Casey Crawford (1st season)
- Home arena: Convocation Center

2025–26 Mid-American Conference men's basketball standings
| | Conf. | | | | Overall |
| Team | W | | L | PCT | W | | L | PCT |
|---|---|---|---|---|---|---|---|---|
| Miami (OH) | 18 | – | 0 | 1.000 | 32 | – | 2 | .941 |
| Akron † | 17 | – | 1 | .944 | 29 | – | 6 | .829 |
| Kent State | 14 | – | 4 | .778 | 24 | – | 10 | .706 |
| Toledo | 11 | – | 7 | .611 | 19 | – | 15 | .559 |
| Bowling Green | 9 | – | 9 | .500 | 18 | – | 14 | .563 |
| Ohio | 9 | – | 9 | .500 | 15 | – | 17 | .469 |
| Buffalo | 7 | – | 11 | .389 | 17 | – | 15 | .531 |
| UMass | 7 | – | 11 | .389 | 17 | – | 16 | .515 |
| Ball State | 7 | – | 11 | .389 | 12 | – | 19 | .387 |
| Central Michigan | 6 | – | 12 | .333 | 10 | – | 21 | .323 |
| Western Michigan | 4 | – | 14 | .222 | 10 | – | 21 | .323 |
| Northern Illinois | 4 | – | 14 | .222 | 9 | – | 21 | .300 |
| Eastern Michigan | 4 | – | 14 | .222 | 10 | – | 21 | .323 |
† 2026 MAC tournament winner

The 2025–26 Ohio University Bobcats men's basketball team represented Ohio University for the 2025–26 NCAA Division I men's basketball season. The Bobcats were led by seventh-year head coach Jeff Boals, who was a 1995 graduate of Ohio University. They play their home games at the Convocation Center in Athens, Ohio, as a member of the Mid-American Conference.

They finished the 2025–26 season 15–17, 9–9 in MAC play, to finish tied for 5th place. The Bobcats struggled to a 1–6 record to open the season. They qualified for the MAC tournament as the 6th seed where they lost in the quarterfinals to Kent State This was Ohio's first losing season in Boals' tenure at Ohio and the first since the 2018–19 season.

== Previous season ==
The Bobcats were picked to win the conference but finished with a 16–16 record. They posted a disappointing 6–6 record entering 2025 prior to the start of league play. They finished tied for fourth in the MAC with a 10–8 conference record and lost their January matchup in the MAC-SBC challenge. With a first round loss to Toledo, they failed to reach the MAC tournament semifinals for the first time since 2020 when the tournament was cancelled due to coronavirus pandemic.

== Offseason ==
=== Departures ===
Departures
| Name | Number | Pos. | Height | Weight | Year | Hometown | Reason |
|---|---|---|---|---|---|---|---|
| Elmore James | 1 | G | 6'3" | 205 | Junior | Cleveland, Ohio | Transferred to Ball State |
| AJ Brown | 3 | G | 6'4" | 210 | RS Sophomore | Orlando, Florida | Transferred to Florida |
| Shereef Mitchell | 4 | G | 6'1" | 175 | Grad. Student | Omaha, Nebraska | Graduated, Exhausted Eligibility |
| Ben Nicol | 7 | F | 6'7" | 208 | RS-Freshman | Charleston, West Virginia | Transferred to Charleston (WV) |
| Ben Estis* | 14 | G | 6'1" | 185 | RS Sophomore | Southlake, Texas | Transferred to Trinity (TX) |
| AJ Clayton | 23 | F | 6'8" | 225 | Senior | Roseville, Ohio | Graduated, Exhausted Eligibility |
| Vic Searls | 35 | F | 6'9" | 240 | Grad. Student | Hilliard, Ohio | Graduated, Exhausted Eligibility |

* Walk-on in 2024–25

=== Incoming transfers ===
Incoming Transfers
| Name | Number | Pos. | Height | Weight | Year | Hometown | Reason |
|---|---|---|---|---|---|---|---|
| Javan Simmons | 1 | F | 6'7" | 235 | Sophomore | Gahanna, OH | Transferred from Toledo. Will have two years of eligibility remaining. |
| Dior Conners | 3 | G | 6'3" | 183 | Junior | Columbus, OH | Transferred from Appalachian State. Will have one year of eligibility remaining. |
| Carter Reese | 11 | G | 6'3" | 200 | Sophomore | Westerville, OH | Transferred from Ohio Northern. Will have three years of eligibility remaining. |
| Jalen Breath | 22 | F | 6'8" | 225 | Junior | Oklahoma City, OK | Transferred from UNC Greensboro. Will have one year of eligibility remaining. |

=== Recruiting class ===
College recruiting
| Name | Hometown | School | Height | Weight | Commit date |
|---|---|---|---|---|---|
| Jordan Fisher; SF | Reynoldsburg, OH | Reynoldsburg | 6 ft 5 in (1.96 m) | 185 lb (84 kg) | |
| Jordan Fisher; SF | Recruit ratings: No ratings found | | | | |
| JJ Kelly; ATH | Chambersburg, PA | Chambersburg Area | 6 ft 6 in (1.98 m) | 195 lb (88 kg) | |
| JJ Kelly; ATH | Recruit ratings: No ratings found | | | | |
| Zay Mosley; SF | Orlando, FL | Oak Ridge | 6 ft 7 in (2.01 m) | 210 lb (95 kg) | |
| Zay Mosley; SF | Recruit ratings: No ratings found | | | | |
Overall recruit ranking:
Note: In many cases, Scout, Rivals, 247Sports, On3, and ESPN may conflict in their listings of height and weight.; In these cases, the average was taken. ESPN grades are on a 100-point scale.; Sources: "2025 Team Ranking". Rivals.

== Preseason ==
On October 21, 2025 the MAC released the preseason coaches poll. Ohio was picked to finish fourth in the MAC regular season. Ohio received zero first place votes but did receive one vote to win the MAC Tournament.

=== Preseason rankings ===
MAC preseason poll
| Predicted finish | Team | Votes (1st place) | 1st place |
|---|---|---|---|
| 1. | Akron | 143 | 11 |
| 2. | Miami | 133 | 2 |
| 3. | Kent State | 122 | -- |
| 4. | Ohio | 108 | -- |
| 5. | UMass | 98 | -- |
| 6. | Toledo | 95 | -- |
| 7. | Bowling Green | 73 | -- |
| 8. | Ball State | 62 | -- |
| 9. | Eastern Michigan | 52 | -- |
| 10. | Western Michigan | 46 | -- |
| 11. | Buffalo | 37 | -- |
| 12. | Central Michigan | 31 | -- |
| 13. | Northern Illinois | 14 | -- |

MAC Tournament Champions: Akron (8), Miami (2), Kent State (1), Ohio (1), UMass (1)

=== Preseason All-MAC ===
Preseason All-MAC teams
| Team | Player | Position | Year |
|---|---|---|---|
| 1st | Jackson Paveletzke | G | Sr. |
| 2nd | Javon Simmons | G | R-Jr. |

== Roster ==
2025–26 Ohio Bobcats men's basketball team
Players
Coaches

| Pos. | # | Name | Height | Weight | Year | Previous school | Hometown |
|---|---|---|---|---|---|---|---|
| G | 0 | Ajay Sheldon | 6 ft 1 in (1.85 m) | 190 lb (86 kg) | Sr | Dublin Coffman | Dublin, OH |
| F | 1 | Javon Simmons | 6 ft 7 in (2.01 m) | 235 lb (107 kg) | RS Jr | Gahanna Lincoln; Toledo | Gahanna, OH |
| G | 3 | Dior Conners | 6 ft 3 in (1.91 m) | 183 lb (83 kg) | Sr | Pickerington North; Appalachian State | Columbus, OH |
| G | 4 | JJ Kelly | 6 ft 6 in (1.98 m) | 195 lb (88 kg) | Fr | Chambersburg Area | Chambersburg, PA |
| F | 5 | Ayden Evans | 6 ft 10 in (2.08 m) | 205 lb (93 kg) | So | Elizabethtown | Radcliff, KY |
| G | 6 | Elijah Elliot | 6 ft 3 in (1.91 m) | 180 lb (82 kg) | So | Oak Ridge | Orlando, FL |
| F | 8 | Zay Mosley | 6 ft 7 in (2.01 m) | 210 lb (95 kg) | Fr | Oak Ridge | Pemberton, NJ |
| F | 10 | Aidan Hadaway | 6 ft 8 in (2.03 m) | 220 lb (100 kg) | Sr | Lafayette | Lafayette, GA |
| G | 11 | Carter Reese (W) | 6 ft 3 in (1.91 m) | 200 lb (91 kg) | Jr | Westerville North; Ohio Northern | Westerville, OH |
| G | 13 | Jackson Paveletzke | 6 ft 2 in (1.88 m) | 175 lb (79 kg) | Sr | Kimberly; Iowa State | Kimberly, WI |
| F | 15 | Chase Boals (W) | 6 ft 5 in (1.96 m) | 253 lb (115 kg) | RS Fr | New Albany | New Albany, OH |
| F | 17 | Kiir Kuany | 6 ft 9 in (2.06 m) | 195 lb (88 kg) | RS Fr | Huntington Prep | Melbourne, Australia |
| G | 21 | Jessie Burris | 6 ft 5 in (1.96 m) | 190 lb (86 kg) | RS Fr | Delaware Hayes | Delaware, OH |
| F | 22 | Jalen Breath | 6 ft 8 in (2.03 m) | 225 lb (102 kg) | RS Sr | Booker T. Washington; UNC Greensboro | Oklahoma City, OK |
| F | 24 | Jordan Fisher | 6 ft 5 in (1.96 m) | 185 lb (84 kg) | Fr | Reynoldsburg | Pickerington, OH |

Head coach

- Jeff Boals (Ohio)

Assistant coach(es)

- Lamar Thornton (Ohio Dominican)
- Kyle Barlow (Concordia–Ann Arbor)
- Lee Martin (Catawba)
- Casey Crawford (Ohio)

Legend

- (C) Team captain
- (S) Suspended
- (I) Ineligible
- (W) Walk-on
- Injured
- Current redshirt

Roster
Last update: October 28, 2025

=== Support staff ===
2025-26 Ohio Bobcats support staff
- Jake Ness – Director of Basketball Operations
- Keith Williams - Graduate Assistant
- Sara Legarsky – Senior Director of Athletics Communications
- Derek Lutz – Staff Athletic Trainer
- Jessica Arquette – Ohio Athletics Sports Dietitian

== Schedule and results ==
| Date time, TV | Rank^{#} | Opponent^{#} | Result | Record | High points | High rebounds | High assists | Site (attendance) city, state |
Exhibition
| October 20, 2025*; 8:10 p.m. | | vs. Wright State; CareSource Invitational-Dayton | L 57–63 | – | 14 – Paveletzke | 11 – Hadaway | 3 – Hadaway | UD Arena; Dayton, OH |
| October 26, 2025*; 2:00 p.m., B1G+ | | at Ohio State | L 74–103 | – | 14 – Tied | 7 – Breath | 7 – Paveletzke | Value City Arena (8,909); Columbus, OH |
Regular season
| November 3, 2025*; 7:00 p.m., ESPN+ | | Arkansas State; MAC-SBC Challenge | L 85–89 | 0–1 | 28 – Hadaway | 6 – Hadaway | 3 – Hadaway | Convocation Center (5,545); Athens, OH |
| November 6, 2025*; 7:00 p.m., ESPN+ | | Illinois State | W 72–68 | 1–1 | 19 – Paveletzke | 8 – Hadaway | 6 – Paveletzke | Convocation Center (3,831); Athens, OH |
| November 11, 2025*; 10:00 p.m., ESPN+ | | at Saint Mary's | L 60–90 | 1–2 | 19 – Paveletzke | 6 – Tied | 6 – Sheldon | University Credit Union Pavilion (3,012); Moraga, CA |
| November 15, 2025*; 12:00 p.m, The CW | | at No. 12 Louisville | L 81–106 | 1–3 | 28 – Paveletzke | 9 – Simmons | 4 – Paveletzke | KFC Yum! Center (14,899); Louisville, KY |
| November 19, 2025*; 7:00 p.m., ESPN+ | | Bethune–Cookman; Sunshine Slam campus game | L 73–76 | 1–4 | 28 – Paveletzke | 11 – Hadaway | 5 – Paveletzke | Convocation Center (3,664); Athens, OH |
| November 24, 2025*; 6:00 p.m., CBSSN | | vs. George Mason; Sunshine Slam Beach Bracket semifinals | L 69–92 | 1–5 | 16 – Hadaway | 6 – Breath | 5 – Paveletzke | Ocean Center; Daytona Beach, FL |
| November 25, 2025*; 5:00 p.m., CBSSN | | vs. Loyola Marymount; Sunshine Slam Beach Bracket consolation game | L 58–70 | 1–6 | 12 – Hadaway | 8 – Elliott | 2 – Tied | Ocean Center; Daytona Beach, FL |
| December 3, 2025*; 7:00 p.m., ESPN+ | | Maine | W 79–57 | 2–6 | 17 – Simmons | 11 – Hadaway | 4 – Breath | Convocation Center (3,553); Athens, OH |
| December 6, 2025*; 4:00 p.m., ESPN+ | | Marshall | W 88–81 | 3–6 | 22 – Paveletzke | 11 – Hadaway | 5 – Simmons | Convocation Center (3,723); Athens, OH |
| December 13, 2025*; 5:00 p.m., PTB Live | | vs. St. Bonaventure; Cleveland Hoops Showdown | W 88–83 ^{OT} | 4–6 | 25 – Paveletzke | 7 – Hadaway | 3 – Tied | Rocket Arena (6,165); Cleveland, OH |
| December 16, 2025*; 7:00 p.m., ESPN+ | | Ohio Wesleyan | W 89–56 | 5–6 | 19 – Hadaway | 8 – Elliot | 9 – Paveletzke | Convocation Center (2,664); Athens, OH |
| December 20, 2025; 4:00 p.m., ESPN+ | | Bowling Green | L 58–68 | 5–7 (0–1) | 19 – Paveletzke | 10 – Hadaway | 1 – Tied | Convocation Center (3,035); Athens, OH |
| December 22, 2025*; 12:00 p.m., ESPN+ | | Miami-Hamilton | W 102–59 | 6–7 | 17 – Fisher | 6 – Elliott | 7 – Elliott | Convocation Center (2,402); Athens, OH |
MAC regular season
| December 30, 2025; 3:00 p.m., ESPN+ | | at Central Michigan | W 80–64 | 7–7 (1–1) | 23 – Paveletzke | 11 – Hadaway | 0 – Paveletzke | McGuirk Arena (1,358); Mount Pleasant, MI |
| January 3, 2026; 2:00 p.m., ESPN+ | | at Eastern Michigan | W 68–67 | 8–7 (2–1) | 15 – Simmons | 8 – Hadaway | 3 – Hadaway | George Gervin GameAbove Center (1,622); Ypsilanti, MI |
| January 6, 2026; 6:00 p.m., CBSSN | | UMass | W 86–83 | 9–7 (3–1) | 20 – Simmons | 6 – Hadaway | 10 – Paveletzke | Convocation Center (2,699); Athens, OH |
| January 10, 2026; 2:00 p.m., ESPN+ | | Buffalo | W 91–80 | 10–7 (4–1) | 27 – Hadaway | 10 – Hadaway | 8 – Paveletzke | Convocation Center (3,872); Athens, OH |
| January 13, 2026; 7:00 p.m., ESPN+ | | at Toledo | L 85–101 | 10–8 (4–2) | 21 – Simmons | 6 – Simmons | 6 – Paveletzke | Savage Arena (4,552); Toledo, OH |
| January 16, 2026; 8:30 p.m., CBSSN | | at Ball State | L 71–76 | 10–9 (4–3) | 22 – Tied | 7 – Hadaway | 4 – Paveletzke | Worthen Arena (2,505); Muncie, IN |
| January 20, 2026; 7:00 p.m., ESPN+ | | Northern Illinois | W 80–77 | 11–9 (5–3) | 23 – Paveletzke | 9 – Kelly | 6 – Hadaway | Convocation Center (2,867); Athens, OH |
| January 23, 2026; 8:00 p.m., ESPNU | | Akron | L 65–86 | 11–10 (5–4) | 16 – Tied | 5 – Tied | 4 – Paveletzke | Convocation Center (4,422); Athens, OH |
| January 27, 2026; 7:00 p.m., ESPN+ | | at Kent State | L 57–72 | 11–11 (5–5) | 13 – Hadaway | 8 – Paveletzke | 3 – Paveletzke | MAC Center (1,571); Kent, OH |
| January 31, 2026; 2:00 p.m., ESPN+ | | at Buffalo | W 95–83 | 12–11 (6–5) | 24 – Simmons | 13 – Simmons | 11 – Paveletzke | Alumni Arena (2,005); Amherst, NY |
| February 3, 2026; 7:00 p.m., ESPN+ | | Western Michigan | W 91–71 | 13–11 (7–5) | 17 – Tied | 8 – Hadaway | 8 – Paveletzke | Convocation Center (3,113); Athens, OH |
| February 7, 2026*; 7:00 p.m., ESPN+ | | at Old Dominion; MAC-SBC Challenge | L 72–78 | 13–12 | 19 – Sheldon | 13 – Hadaway | 11 – Paveletzke | Chartway Arena (6,657); Norfolk, VA |
| February 13, 2026; 9:00 p.m., ESPN | | at No. 23 Miami (OH) | L 74–90 | 13–13 (7–6) | 22 – Paveletzke | 4 – Tied | 3 – Tied | Millett Hall (10,640); Oxford, OH |
| February 17, 2026; 7:00 p.m., ESPN+ | | Ball State | W 69–57 | 14–13 (8–6) | 18 – Tied | 8 – Hadaway | 6 – Paveletzke | Convocation Center (4,164); Athens, OH |
| February 21, 2026; 3:00 p.m., ESPN+ | | at Northern Illinois | W 74–66 | 15–13 (9–6) | 23 – Simmons | 11 – Hadaway | 6 – Paveletzke | Convocation Center (1,245); DeKalb, IL |
| February 28, 2026; 4:00 p.m., ESPN+ | | Toledo | L 67–79 | 15–14 (9–7) | 20 – Simmons | 12 – Tied | 5 – Simmons | Convocation Center (6,404); Athens, OH |
| March 3, 2026; 7:00 p.m., ESPN+ | | at UMass | L 82–94 | 15–15 (9–8) | 24 – Paveletzke | 7 – Hadaway | 7 – Paveletzke | Mullins Center (2,115); Amherst, MA |
| March 6, 2026; 9:00 p.m., ESPN2 | | No. 19 Miami (OH) | L 108–110 ^{OT} | 15–16 (9–9) | 37 – Paveletzke | 9 – Simmons | 6 – Paveletzke | Convocation Center (10,740); Athens, OH |
MAC Tournament
| March 12, 2026; 6:30 p.m., ESPN+ | (6) | vs. (3) Kent State; Quarterfinals | L 75–86 | 15–17 | 24 – Hadaway | 7 – Tied | 7 – Paveletzke | Rocket Arena (9,123); Cleveland, OH |
*Non-conference game. ^{#}Rankings from AP Poll. (#) Tournament seedings in parentheses. All times are in Eastern Time.

== Statistics ==
=== Team Statistics ===
Through March 12, 2026

| Record | Ohio | OPP |
|---|---|---|
| Scoring | 2492 | 2515 |
| Scoring Average | 77.88 | 78.59 |
| Field goals – Att | 884–1916 | 879–1905 |
| 3-pt. Field goals – Att | 224–728 | 238–656 |
| Free throws – Att | 500–708 | 519–713 |
| Rebounds | 1076 | 1156 |
| Assists | 432 | 427 |
| Turnovers | 348 | 378 |
| Steals | 196 | 192 |
| Blocked Shots | 114 | 86 |

=== Player statistics ===
| | | | Minutes | | Scoring | | Total FGs | | | 3-point FGs | | | Free-Throws | | | Rebounds | | | | | | | | |
| Player | GP | GS | Tot | Avg | Pts | Avg | FG | FGA | Pct | 3FG | 3FA | Pct | FT | FTA | Pct | Off | Def | Tot | Avg | A | PF | TO | Stl | Blk |
|---|---|---|---|---|---|---|---|---|---|---|---|---|---|---|---|---|---|---|---|---|---|---|---|---|
| Jackson Paveletzke | 31 | 31 | 1137 | 36.7 | 536 | 17.3 | 172 | 367 | 0.469 | 31 | 98 | 0.316 | 161 | 200 | 0.805 | 15 | 79 | 94 | 3.0 | 163 | 46 | 70 | 27 | 0 |
| Javan Simmons | 31 | 31 | 840 | 27.1 | 469 | 15.1 | 163 | 304 | 0.536 | 6 | 30 | 0.200 | 137 | 200 | 0.685 | 81 | 95 | 176 | 5.7 | 50 | 89 | 52 | 19 | 24 |
| Aidan Hadaway | 32 | 32 | 1019 | 31.8 | 460 | 14.4 | 185 | 381 | 0.486 | 44 | 146 | 0.301 | 46 | 66 | 0.697 | 60 | 178 | 238 | 7.4 | 68 | 91 | 61 | 25 | 23 |
| JJ Kelly | 31 | 26 | 826 | 26.6 | 266 | 8.6 | 104 | 200 | 0.520 | 24 | 73 | 0.329 | 34 | 44 | 0.773 | 35 | 83 | 118 | 3.8 | 18 | 76 | 28 | 27 | 26 |
| Ajay Sheldon | 32 | 30 | 989 | 30.9 | 241 | 7.5 | 77 | 216 | 0.356 | 66 | 178 | 0.371 | 21 | 30 | 0.700 | 13 | 65 | 78 | 2.4 | 61 | 75 | 37 | 48 | 3 |
| Dior Conners | 31 | 3 | 358 | 11.5 | 129 | 4.2 | 39 | 122 | 0.320 | 25 | 91 | 0.275 | 26 | 33 | 0.788 | 9 | 29 | 38 | 1.2 | 22 | 41 | 18 | 16 | 1 |
| Kiir Kuany | 31 | 1 | 276 | 8.9 | 109 | 3.5 | 44 | 83 | 0.530 | 7 | 29 | 0.241 | 14 | 19 | 0.737 | 10 | 32 | 42 | 1.4 | 5 | 37 | 9 | 9 | 12 |
| Jalen Breath | 28 | 1 | 374 | 13.4 | 104 | 3.7 | 37 | 70 | 0.529 | 0 | 1 | 0.000 | 30 | 72 | 0.417 | 32 | 51 | 83 | 3.0 | 10 | 56 | 21 | 6 | 13 |
| Jesse Burris | 24 | 0 | 239 | 10.0 | 81 | 3.4 | 29 | 80 | 0.363 | 14 | 49 | 0.286 | 9 | 10 | 0.900 | 9 | 20 | 29 | 1.2 | 5 | 23 | 12 | 5 | 4 |
| Elijah Elliott | 13 | 5 | 280 | 21.5 | 53 | 4.1 | 17 | 57 | 0.298 | 5 | 22 | 0.227 | 14 | 22 | 0.636 | 4 | 41 | 45 | 3.5 | 26 | 24 | 15 | 9 | 3 |
| Ayden Evans | 11 | 0 | 91 | 8.3 | 25 | 2.3 | 10 | 22 | 0.455 | 1 | 6 | 0.167 | 4 | 6 | 0.667 | 4 | 8 | 12 | 1.1 | 3 | 11 | 3 | 3 | 5 |
| Jordan Fisher | 5 | 0 | 22 | 4.4 | 19 | 3.8 | 7 | 14 | 0.500 | 1 | 5 | 0.200 | 4 | 6 | 0.667 | 0 | 2 | 2 | 0.4 | 1 | 3 | 1 | 2 | 0 |
| Total | 32 | - | 6451 | - | 2492 | 77.9 | 884 | 1916 | 0.461 | 224 | 728 | 0.308 | 500 | 708 | 0.706 | 272 | 683 | 955 | 29.8 | 432 | 572 | 348 | 196 | 114 |
| Opponents | 32 | - | 6451 | - | 2515 | 78.6 | 879 | 1905 | 0.461 | 238 | 656 | 0.363 | 519 | 713 | 0.728 | 357 | 799 | 1156 | 36.1 | 427 | 616 | 378 | 192 | 86 |

Legend
| GP | Games played | GS | Games started | Avg | Average per game |
| FG | Field-goals made | FGA | Field-goal attempts | Off | Offensive rebounds |
| Def | Defensive rebounds | A | Assists | TO | Turnovers |
| Blk | Blocks | Stl | Steals | High | Team high |

== Awards and honors ==
=== Weekly Awards ===
Weekly Award Honors
| Honors | Player | Position | Date Awarded | Source |
|---|---|---|---|---|
| MAC player of the week | Jackson Paveletzke | G | January 12 | |

=== All-MAC Awards ===
Postseason All-MAC teams
| Team | Player | Position | Year |
|---|---|---|---|
| All-MAC 2nd Team | Jackson Paveletzke | G | Sr. |
| All-MAC Honorable Mention | Javan Simmons | F | R-Jr. |
