= 2025–26 Miami RedHawks men's basketball team =

American college basketball season

2025–26 Miami RedHawks men's basketball

MAC regular season champions

NCAA tournament, First round
- Conference: Mid-American Conference
- Record: 32–2 (18–0 MAC)
- Head coach: Travis Steele (4th season)
- Associate head coach: Jonathan Holmes (4th season)
- Assistant coaches: Khristian Smith (4th season); Ben Botts (1st season); Carl Richburg (2nd season); Elijah Pennington (2nd season)
- Home arena: Millett Hall

2025–26 Mid-American Conference men's basketball standings
| | Conf. | | | | Overall |
| Team | W | | L | PCT | W | | L | PCT |
|---|---|---|---|---|---|---|---|---|
| Miami (OH) | 18 | – | 0 | 1.000 | 32 | – | 2 | .941 |
| Akron † | 17 | – | 1 | .944 | 29 | – | 6 | .829 |
| Kent State | 14 | – | 4 | .778 | 24 | – | 10 | .706 |
| Toledo | 11 | – | 7 | .611 | 19 | – | 15 | .559 |
| Bowling Green | 9 | – | 9 | .500 | 18 | – | 14 | .563 |
| Ohio | 9 | – | 9 | .500 | 15 | – | 17 | .469 |
| Buffalo | 7 | – | 11 | .389 | 17 | – | 15 | .531 |
| UMass | 7 | – | 11 | .389 | 17 | – | 16 | .515 |
| Ball State | 7 | – | 11 | .389 | 12 | – | 19 | .387 |
| Central Michigan | 6 | – | 12 | .333 | 10 | – | 21 | .323 |
| Western Michigan | 4 | – | 14 | .222 | 10 | – | 21 | .323 |
| Northern Illinois | 4 | – | 14 | .222 | 9 | – | 21 | .300 |
| Eastern Michigan | 4 | – | 14 | .222 | 10 | – | 21 | .323 |
† 2026 MAC tournament winner

The 2025–26 Miami RedHawks men's basketball team represented Miami University during the 2025–26 NCAA Division I men's basketball season. The RedHawks, led by fourth-year head coach Travis Steele, played their home games at Millett Hall in Oxford, Ohio as members of the Mid-American Conference (MAC). Miami won every game in the regular season to become the first MAC team to win all of its conference games in the regular season. The team concluded the season with active school record streaks for consecutive home wins (31) and consecutive road wins (15). During the season, it established a school record for consecutive weeks ranked (7) and set MAC record for consecutive MAC game wins (18 going into the tournament). Having only tournament game losses this season and ending the previous season with a tournament loss, it also concluded the season with an active 33-game consecutive regular season games win streak and a 20-game consecutive MAC regular season game win streak. The team also set a record for most wins by three points or fewer by an undefeated team (8). The team's 32 wins established a single-season school record by surpassing the prior season's total of 25. The team tied the 32-win 2018–19 Buffalo Bulls, for the conference single-season win record.

== Previous season ==
The RedHawks finished the 2024–25 season 23–8, 14–4 in MAC play to finish in second place. They defeated Eastern Michigan and Kent State before losing to Akron in the championship round of the MAC tournament, finishing 25–9. The team tied the school record with 23 regular season wins and set a record with 15 consecutive single-season home wins. The 25 overall wins established a school record. They were the first team to reach the Mid-American Conference men's basketball tournament championship game since the 2006–07 Miami RedHawks men's basketball team won the 2007 MAC men's basketball tournament.

== Achievements ==
On December 16, 2025, Miami defeated Wright State 83–76 for its 11th consecutive victory to set a school record for best start. On December 18, starting point guard Evan Ipsaro was named to the 2025-26 Lou Henson Award Early Season Watch List, but he tore his ACL in the December 20 victory against Ball State and was lost for the season.

On January 6, Miami defeated Western Michigan 87–76 to notch a school record 24th consecutive home win. The team's January 13 victory over Central Michigan brought them to an 18–0 record becoming the first unranked team to reach that status since the 1978–79 season. On January 17, 2026 defeated Buffalo in overtime to secure the Miami Redhawks 19th consecutive win to start the season, which tied the 1975–76 Western Michigan Broncos men's basketball team for the best start in MAC history. The game was close throughout and featured 27 lead changes and 8 ties. Following the victory, Miami entered the 2025–26 basketball rankings in the AP Poll for the first time since the 1998–99 Miami RedHawks men's basketball team appeared in the 1998–99 rankings. No MAC team had been ranked since the 2018–19 Buffalo Bulls finished the season ranked. On January 20, the team achieved a 20–0 start with an overtime victory over Kent State on the road, breaking the MAC record for consecutive wins to start a season (20) and the school record for consecutive road wins (9). The team also tied the single-season record for consecutive road wins (8) and started the MAC season 8–0 for the first time since the 1994–95 Miami Redskins men's basketball team. On January 27, they played their first home game at Millett Hall as a ranked team against UMass in which they won, extending the MAC record for consecutive wins to start a season to 21. The game also was the tenth highest attended game at Millett Hall. The victory also tied them with the 2001–02 Kent State Golden Flashes men's basketball team for the longest in-season winning streak in MAC history. On January 31, they set the longest winning in-season streak in MAC history by defeating Northern Illinois 85–61. The game also set the attendance record at Millet Hall as they had 10,640 in person. The victory also pulled them neck-and-neck with Akron for the nation's longest active Division I home winning streak at 28, following the January 29 North Dakota late comeback against St. Thomas (Minnesota), the prior home streak record holder.

A February 3 victory over Buffalo broke the in-season school record for consecutive road wins (9). On February 9, Arizona lost to Kansas, leaving Miami as the only unbeaten team in NCAA men's Division I basketball. After Duke matched Akron and Miami with 28 consecutive home wins, a victory on February 13 against Battle of the Bricks rival Ohio, to reach 29 consecutive home wins, 25–0 and a 12–0 conference start, gave Miami its best conference start since the 1957–58 Miami Redskins. Since the Miami Redhawks swim team has been showing up in the winter to support the basketball team in just their Speedo trunks, head coach Travis Steele committed on College GameDay to Rece Davis to be hoisted while in a swimming motion wearing only a Speedo on Selection Sunday if the team won its final 6 games and the 2026 MAC men's basketball tournament. Miami reached both 13–0 in conference play and achieved more than 25 wins (26–0) for the first time in school history with an 86–77 win on February 17 against UMass. On February 20, guard Luke Skaljac scored a career-high 24 points in a home victory against Bowling Green and Miami pushed their winning streak to 27–0 while improving to 14–0 in conference play for the first time in program history. This win also extended their home winning streak to 30, which tied Duke for the longest active streak in the nation, and matched their single-season record of 15 straight home wins. On February 23, the team was ranked 21 in the AP Poll setting a school record for it sixth consecutive week of rankings as well achieving the highest ranking since the 1977–78 Miami Redskins and highest non-final poll ranking since the 1970–71 Miami Redskins. The team became the fifth team of the 21st century to enter March undefeated (following the 2003–04 Saint Joseph's Hawks, 2013–14 Wichita State Shockers, 2014–15 Kentucky Wildcats and 2020–21 Gonzaga Bulldogs). The team's March 2 ascension to the number 19 ranking was the school's highest ranking since March 13, 1978.

On March 3, the team defeated Toledo 74–72, earning their 30 win, 16th home win and 17th conference win of the season and 31st consecutive home win while sweeping Toledo for the first time since the 1996–97 Miami Redskins. The win clinched 2025–26 MAC regular season championship for Miami who had lost 22 consecutive games to Toledo before the current 3-game series streak. The win also gave Miami the conference record for consecutive MAC conference games wins at 17, surpassing the 1956–57 Miami Redskins. (Note: This published record is in discord with Sports Reference, which shows the 56-57 team won its first 7 conference games and the 55-56 team won its last two conference games.) (Note: The 2012–13 & 2024–25 Akron Zips men's basketball teams are both known to have started the MAC conference schedule with 13–0 records.) The team achieved this with only one Quad 2 win and no Quad 1 wins. This was Miami's first conference regular season championship since the 2004–05 Miami RedHawks, but the slim margin of victory tied Miami for the most (7) wins of three points or less by an undefeated team since 1948-49. The team ended the season with an active 31-game home win streak. Conference rival Akron, also concluded its season with an active 31 consecutive home game wins streak. Duke ended its season with 32 consecutive home game wins.

On March 6, Miami defeated Battle of the Bricks rival Ohio 110–108 in overtime to finish the regular season 31–0, making them the third NCAA men's Division I program to do so (2013–14 Wichita State & 2014–15 Kentucky). The win was the 1500th in school history and the first at the Convocation Center since January 9, 2011. The game was broadcast nationally on ESPN2 after having been rescheduled on February 23. They were the 25th NCAA Division I program to finish the regular season undefeated since 1948 but just the fifth since the 1990–91 UNLV Runnin' Rebels basketball team. Although no team has previously achieved 29 or more wins and not been invited to the NCAA Division I men's basketball tournament, it was speculated that the team would need to win the 2026 MAC men's basketball tournament to get invited. At 18–0 in conference, Miami held on to this record setting streak. Other MAC conference teams to go undefeated in conference play include 10–0 1949–50 Cincinnati Bearcats and 12–0 1957–58 Miami Redskins.

The 20th ranked RedHawks were eliminated in the quarterfinals of the MAC tournament to UMass, marking their first loss of the season. As a result they were no longer ranked and only receiving votes in both polls. This ended their MAC conference game streak at 18, but the 2024–25 team had won its final 2 MAC regular season games, leaving the team with a 20-game MAC regular season game streak.

Despite the MAC tourney loss, they earned an at-large bid to the NCAA tournament. Miami's bid was the MAC conference's first at large bid since the Wally Szczerbiak-led 1998–99 Miami RedHawks team and the school's first invitation since the 2006–07 Miami RedHawks. They advanced to the round of 64 with a First Four win (the team's 32nd of the season) over SMU before falling in the first round to 23rd-ranked Tennessee. 32 wins equalled the Buffalo Bulls who had set the MAC conference single-season record in 2019. The First Four win was the school's first NCAA tournament win since the 1998–99 team's success at the 1999 NCAA tournament.

== Offseason ==
=== Departures ===
Departures
| Name | Number | Pos. | Height | Weight | Year | Hometown | Reason for departure |
|---|---|---|---|---|---|---|---|
| Kam Craft | 4 | G/F | 6'6" | 205 | Sophomore | Chicago, Illinois | Transferred to Georgia Tech |
| Mekhi Cooper | 11 | G | 6'1" | 165 | Sophomore | Bolingbrook, Illinois | Transferred to Lindenwood |
| Dan Luers | 25 | G | 6'5" | 220 | Graduate student | Lebanon, Ohio | Graduated, Graduate Assistant at Miami |
| Reece Potter | 35 | C | 7'1" | 215 | Sophomore | Lexington, Kentucky | Transferred to Kentucky |

=== Incoming transfers ===
Incoming transfers
| Name | Number | Pos. | Height | Weight | Year | Hometown | Previous school |
|---|---|---|---|---|---|---|---|
| Almar Atlason | 11 | F | 6'8" | 235 | Junior | Reykjavík, Iceland | Bradley |

=== Recruiting class ===
College recruiting
| Name | Hometown | School | Height | Weight | Commit date |
|---|---|---|---|---|---|
| Tyler Robbins; PF | Upper St. Clair, Pennsylvania | Upper St. Clair High School | 6 ft 10 in (2.08 m) | 230 lb (100 kg) | Aug 6, 2024 |
| Tyler Robbins; PF | Recruit ratings: Rivals: 247Sports: ESPN: (N/A) | | | | |
| Justin Kirby; SG | Fishers, Indiana | Fishers High School | 6 ft 3 in (1.91 m) | 175 lb (79 kg) | Nov 13, 2024 |
| Justin Kirby; SG | Recruit ratings: Rivals: 247Sports: ESPN: (N/A) | | | | |
| Kyle Waltz; SF | Geneva, Ohio | SPIRE Academy | 6 ft 7 in (2.01 m) | 200 lb (91 kg) | Jul 3, 2024 |
| Kyle Waltz; SF | Recruit ratings: Rivals: 247Sports: ESPN: (N/A) | | | | |
| Trey Perry; PG | Middletown, Ohio | Lakota East High School | 6 ft 2 in (1.88 m) | 170 lb (77 kg) | Jun 25, 2024 |
| Trey Perry; PG | Recruit ratings: Rivals: 247Sports: ESPN: (N/A) | | | | |
| Leshawn Stowers; SG | Peoria, Illinois | Peoria High School | 6 ft 5 in (1.96 m) | 200 lb (91 kg) | Sep 25, 2024 |
| Leshawn Stowers; SG | Recruit ratings: Rivals: 247Sports: ESPN: (N/A) | | | | |
Overall recruit ranking:
Note: In many cases, Scout, Rivals, 247Sports, On3, and ESPN may conflict in their listings of height and weight.; In these cases, the average was taken. ESPN grades are on a 100-point scale.; Sources: "2025 Team Ranking". Rivals.

== Roster ==
2025–26 Miami RedHawks men's basketball team
Players
Coaches

| Pos. | # | Name | Height | Weight | Year | Previous school | Hometown |
|---|---|---|---|---|---|---|---|
| G/F | 0 | Eian Elmer | 6 ft 6 in (1.98 m) | 215 lb (98 kg) | Jr | Robert A. Taft Information Technology High School | Cincinnati, Ohio |
| G | 1 | Trey Perry | 6 ft 2 in (1.88 m) | 185 lb (84 kg) | Fr | Lakota East High School | Liberty Township, Ohio |
| G | 2 | Evan Ipsaro (injured) | 6 ft 0 in (1.83 m) | 180 lb (82 kg) | Jr | Covington Catholic High School | Crestview Hills, Kentucky |
| G | 3 | Luke Skaljac | 6 ft 2 in (1.88 m) | 190 lb (86 kg) | So | Brecksville–Broadview Heights High School | Brecksville, Ohio |
| G | 4 | Brady Ganley | 6 ft 3 in (1.91 m) | 180 lb (82 kg) | Fr | Brecksville–Broadview Heights High School | Brecksville, Ohio |
| G | 5 | Peter Suder | 6 ft 5 in (1.96 m) | 215 lb (98 kg) | Sr | Bellarmine | Carmel, Indiana |
| G | 6 | Jack Sauer | 6 ft 2 in (1.88 m) | 180 lb (82 kg) | Fr | Loveland High School | Loveland, Ohio |
| F | 7 | Ethan Wright | 6 ft 5 in (1.96 m) | 180 lb (82 kg) | Jr | Spring Valley Academy | Philadelphia, Pennsylvania |
| G | 8 | Eli Yofan | 6 ft 2 in (1.88 m) | 205 lb (93 kg) | Sr | Fox Chapel Area High School | Pittsburgh, Pennsylvania |
| F | 11 | Almar Atlason | 6 ft 8 in (2.03 m) | 235 lb (107 kg) | Jr | Bradley | Reykjavík, Iceland |
| G | 12 | Justin Kirby | 6 ft 4 in (1.93 m) | 185 lb (84 kg) | Fr | Fishers High School | Fishers, Indiana |
| F | 13 | Antwone Woolfolk | 6 ft 9 in (2.06 m) | 245 lb (111 kg) | Sr | Rutgers | Cleveland, Ohio |
| F | 20 | Tyler Robbins | 6 ft 10 in (2.08 m) | 245 lb (111 kg) | Fr | Upper St. Clair High School | Pittsburgh, Pennsylvania |
| G | 21 | Leshawn Stowers | 6 ft 5 in (1.96 m) | 190 lb (86 kg) | Fr | Peoria Central High School | Peoria, Illinois |
| G/F | 22 | Brant Byers | 6 ft 8 in (2.03 m) | 200 lb (91 kg) | RS So | Perkiomen School | Chambersburg, Pennsylvania |
| F | 24 | Jackson Kotecki | 6 ft 9 in (2.06 m) | 220 lb (100 kg) | Jr | St. Ignatius College Prep | Chicago, Illinois |
| F | 25 | Kyle Waltz | 6 ft 7 in (2.01 m) | 200 lb (91 kg) | Fr | York Community High School | Elmhurst, Illinois |
| G | 33 | Blake Anderson | 6 ft 4 in (1.93 m) | 205 lb (93 kg) | Jr | Evansville Memorial High School | Evansville, Indiana |

Head coach

- Travis Steele (Butler)

Assistant coach(es)

- Jonathan Holmes (North Carolina)
- Khristian Smith (Indiana State)
- Ben Botts (Purdue Fort Wayne)
- Carl Richburg (Miami (OH))
- Elijah Pennington (IUPUI)

Legend

- (C) Team captain
- (S) Suspended
- (I) Ineligible
- (W) Walk-on
- Injured
- Current redshirt

Roster
Last update: October 7, 2025

== Schedule and results ==
| Date time, TV | Rank^{#} | Opponent^{#} | Result | Record | High points | High rebounds | High assists | Site (attendance) city, state |
Regular season
| November 3, 2025*; 7:00 p.m., ESPN+ | | Old Dominion; MAC-SBC Challenge | W 87–72 | 1–0 | 18 – Byers | 8 – Elmer | 4 – Skaljac | Millett Hall (2,131); Oxford, OH |
| November 7, 2025*; 7:30 p.m., ESPN+ | | Trinity Christian (IL) | W 129–49 | 2–0 | 23 – Waltz | 10 – Robbins | 6 – Atlason | Millett Hall (2,087); Oxford, OH |
| November 15, 2025*; 2:00 p.m., MW Network | | at Air Force | W 76–61 | 3–0 | 18 – Byers | 13 – Woolfolk | 7 – Ipsaro | Clune Arena (1,117); Air Force Academy, CO |
| November 20, 2025*; 7:00 p.m., ESPN+ | | Mercyhurst; Marshall MTE | W 76–71 | 4–0 | 16 – Atlason | 7 – Woolfolk | 4 – Tied | Millett Hall (1,633); Oxford, OH |
| November 23, 2025*; 1:00 p.m., ESPN+ | | Arkansas–Pine Bluff; Marshall MTE | W 111–84 | 5–0 | 20 – Ipsaro | 8 – Elmer | 6 – Skaljac | Millett Hall (1,176); Oxford, OH |
| November 26, 2025*; 2:00 p.m., SIACN | | vs. UNC Greensboro; Riley Decker Showcase | W 82–71 | 6–0 | 20 – Suder | 7 – Suder | 4 – Tied | John Hurst Adams Gymnasium (46); Jacksonville, FL |
| December 2, 2025*; 7:00 p.m., ESPN+ | | Indiana East | W 109–65 | 7–0 | 15 – Waltz | 7 – Tied | 5 – Tied | Millett Hall (1,246); Oxford, OH |
| December 6, 2025*; 1:00 p.m., ESPN+ | | Maine | W 93–61 | 8–0 | 24 – Ipsaro | 7 – Skaljac | 7 – Suder | Millett Hall (1,349); Oxford, OH |
| December 10, 2025*; 6:00 p.m., ESPN+ | | at UNC Asheville | W 90–87 ^{OT} | 9–0 | 27 – Ipsaro | 6 – Elmer | 9 – Skaljac | Kimmel Arena (903); Asheville, NC |
| December 13, 2025*; 3:00 p.m., ESPN+ | | at Eastern Kentucky | W 79–69 | 10–0 | 19 – Atlason | 5 – Tied | 5 – Tied | Baptist Health Arena (600); Richmond, KY |
| December 16, 2025*; 7:00 p.m., ESPN+ | | at Wright State | W 83–76 | 11–0 | 27 – Byers | 6 – Tied | 3 – Tied | Nutter Center (4,892); Fairborn, OH |
| December 20, 2025; 2:00 p.m., ESPN+ | | at Ball State | W 86–77 | 12–0 (1–0) | 26 – Atlason | 7 – Elmer | 5 – Suder | Worthen Arena (3,503); Muncie, IN |
| December 22, 2025*; 1:00 p.m., ESPN+ | | Milligan | W 135–81 | 13–0 | 24 – Perry | 8 – Robbins | 9 – Perry | Millett Hall (1,435); Oxford, OH |
| December 30, 2025; 7:00 p.m., ESPN+ | | at Bowling Green | W 93–83 | 14–0 (2–0) | 17 – Tied | 8 – Suder | 5 – Tied | Stroh Center (3,844); Bowling Green, OH |
| January 3, 2026; 3:30 p.m., ESPN+ | | Akron | W 76–73 | 15–0 (3–0) | 26 – Byers | 8 – Elmer | 9 – Suder | Millett Hall (4,111); Oxford, OH |
| January 6, 2026; 7:00 p.m., ESPN+ | | Western Michigan | W 87–76 | 16–0 (4–0) | 21 – Atlason | 8 – Kirby | 5 – Suder | Millett Hall (1,407); Oxford, OH |
| January 9, 2026; 6:00 p.m., CBSSN | | at Toledo | W 87–73 | 17–0 (5–0) | 21 – Woolfolk | 7 – Byers | 6 – Suder | Savage Arena (5,143); Toledo, OH |
| January 13, 2026; 7:00 p.m., ESPN+ | | Central Michigan | W 100–61 | 18–0 (6–0) | 24 – Byers | 7 – Tied | 6 – Skaljac | Millett Hall (2,021); Oxford, OH |
| January 17, 2026; 1:00 p.m., ESPN+ | | Buffalo | W 105–102 ^{OT} | 19–0 (7–0) | 37 – Suder | 11 – Woolfolk | 10 – Skaljac | Millett Hall (5,088); Oxford, OH |
| January 20, 2026; 7:00 p.m., ESPN+ | No. 25 | at Kent State | W 107–101 ^{OT} | 20–0 (8–0) | 27 – Suder | 10 – Suder | 8 – Tied | MAC Center (6,327); Kent, OH |
| January 27, 2026; 9:00 p.m., ESPNU | No. 24 | UMass | W 86–84 | 21–0 (9–0) | 30 – Elmer | 7 – Tied | 9 – Suder | Millett Hall (9,223); Oxford, OH |
| January 31, 2026; 3:30 p.m., ESPN+ | No. 24 | Northern Illinois | W 85–61 | 22–0 (10–0) | 21 – Byers | 12 – Woolfolk | 3 – Woolfolk | Millett Hall (10,640); Oxford, OH |
| February 3, 2026; 6:30 p.m., ESPN+ | No. 23 | at Buffalo | W 73–71 | 23–0 (11–0) | 19 – Skaljac | 5 – Tied | 8 – Suder | Alumni Arena (3,507); Amherst, NY |
| February 7, 2026*; 4:00 p.m., ESPN+ | No. 23 | at Marshall; MAC-SBC Challenge | W 90–74 | 24–0 | 18 – Elmer | 9 – Elmer | 7 – Skaljac | Cam Henderson Center (5,475); Huntington, WV |
| February 13, 2026; 9:00 p.m., ESPN | No. 23 | Ohio | W 90–74 | 25–0 (12–0) | 21 – Byers | 6 – Tied | 8 – Skaljac | Millett Hall (10,640); Oxford, OH |
| February 17, 2026; 7:00 p.m., ESPN+ | No. 22 | at UMass | W 86–77 | 26–0 (13–0) | 23 – Suder | 5 – Tied | 7 – Skaljac | Mullins Center (7,524); Amherst, MA |
| February 20, 2026; 8:30 p.m., CBSSN | No. 22 | Bowling Green | W 91–77 | 27–0 (14–0) | 24 – Skaljac | 8 – Tied | 5 – Skaljac | Millett Hall (10,127); Oxford, OH |
| February 24, 2026; 6:30 p.m., ESPN+ | No. 21 | at Eastern Michigan | W 74–64 | 28–0 (15–0) | 16 – Byers | 10 – Suder | 4 – Skaljac | George Gervin GameAbove Center (3,136); Ypsilanti, MI |
| February 27, 2026; 6:00 p.m., CBSSN | No. 21 | at Western Michigan | W 69–67 | 29–0 (16–0) | 18 – Suder | 8 – Kirby | 3 – Perry | University Arena (3,193); Kalamazoo, MI |
| March 3, 2026; 7:00 p.m., ESPN+ | No. 19 | Toledo | W 74–72 | 30–0 (17–0) | 19 – Suder | 6 – Woolfolk | 4 – Suder | Millett Hall (10,640); Oxford, OH |
| March 6, 2026; 9:00 p.m., ESPN2 | No. 19 | at Ohio | W 110–108 ^{OT} | 31–0 (18–0) | 32 – Elmer | 12 – Elmer | 4 – Tied | Convocation Center (10,740); Athens, OH |
MAC tournament
| March 12, 2026; 11:00 a.m., ESPN+ | (1) No. 20 | vs. (8) UMass; Quarterfinal | L 83–87 | 31–1 | 17 – Byers | 5 – Tied | 7 – Tied | Rocket Arena; Cleveland, OH |
NCAA tournament
| March 18, 2026*; 9:15 p.m., truTV | (11 MW) | vs. (11 MW) SMU; First Four | W 89–79 | 32–1 | 23 – Elmer | 7 – Suder | 6 – Suder | UD Arena (12,558); Dayton, OH |
| March 20, 2026*; 4:25 p.m., TBS | (11 MW) | vs. (6 MW) No. 23 Tennessee; First round | L 56–78 | 32–2 | 27 – Suder | 6 – Byers | 3 – Skaljac | Xfinity Mobile Arena (19,686); Philadelphia, PA |
*Non-conference game. ^{#}Rankings from AP Poll. (#) Tournament seedings in parentheses. MW=Midwest. All times are in Eastern Time Zone.

== Honors ==
=== In seasons ===
During the season the following players were recognized for superior performance as MAC Player of the Week:

Week 7 (December 22, 2025) Brant Byers
Week 16 (February 23, 2026) Luke Skaljac (co with Tavari Johnson, Akron)
Week 18 (March 9, 2026) Eian Elmer

=== Postseason ===
Following the season the following MAC awards were conferred upon Miami Redhawks individuals:

Coach of the Year: Travis Steele
Player of the Year: Peter Suder
All-MAC First Team: Peter Suder
All-MAC Second Team: Brant Byers and Eian Elmer
All-MAC Third Team: Luke Skaljac
All-MAC Honorable mention: Antwone Woolfolk

== Rankings ==
Ranking movements Legend: ██ Increase in ranking ██ Decrease in ranking — = Not ranked RV = Received votes т = Tied with team above or below
| | Week | | | | | | | | | | | | | | | | | | | | |
| Poll | Pre | 1 | 2 | 3 | 4 | 5 | 6 | 7 | 8 | 9 | 10 | 11 | 12 | 13 | 14 | 15 | 16 | 17 | 18 | 19 | Final |
|---|---|---|---|---|---|---|---|---|---|---|---|---|---|---|---|---|---|---|---|---|---|
| AP | — | — | — | — | — | RV | RV | RV | RV* | RV | RV | 25 | 24 | 23 | 23 | 22 | 21 | 19 | 20 | RV | RV |
| Coaches | — | — | — | — | — | — | — | — | RV | RV | RV | RV | 25т | 24 | 24 | 23 | 25 | 20 | 20 | RV | RV |

*AP did not release a week 8 poll.
