= Green Level High School =

Public school in Cary, North Carolina US

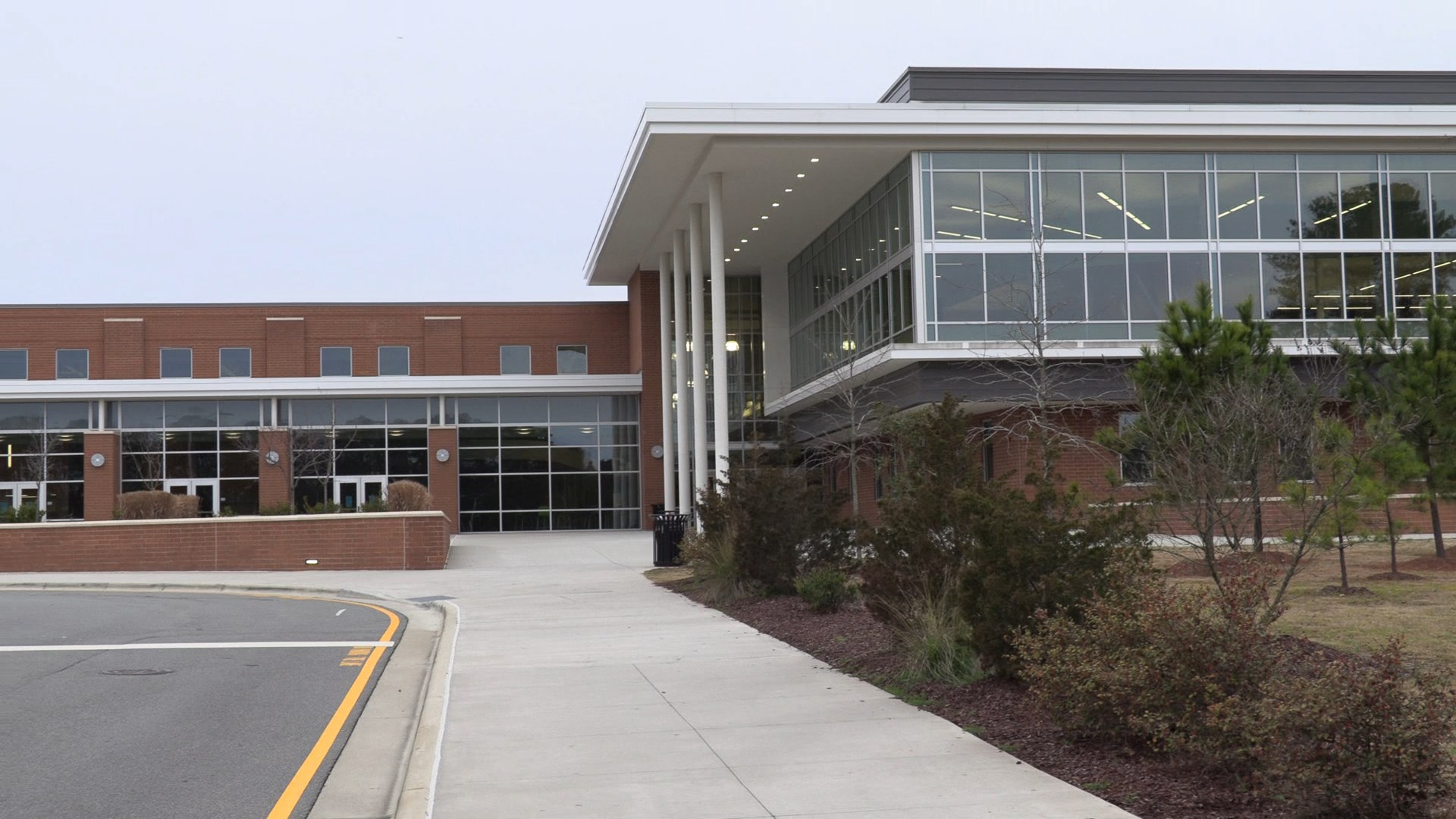
- Green Level High School, March 2020

Location
- 7600 Roberts Road; Cary, North Carolina 27519; United States; 35°46′21″N 78°53′59″W

Information
- School type: Public high school
- Founded: 2019 (7 years ago)
- School district: Wake County Public School System
- NCES District ID: 3704720
- Superintendent: Dr. Robert Taylor
- CEEB code: 340066
- NCES School ID: 370472003495
- Principal: Elizabeth Hanna
- Teaching staff: 106.98 (FTE)
- Grades: 9–12
- Enrollment: 2,149 (2023-2024)
- Student to teacher ratio: 20.09
- Colors: Navy blue, lime green, and white
- Athletics: NCHSAA 8A
- Athletics conference: Quad City Seven 8A
- Mascot: Gator
- Newspaper: The Gator's Eye
- Yearbook: Equilibrium
- Website: Green Level High School

Green Level High School is a public high school located at 7600 Roberts Road in Cary, North Carolina. It is part of the Wake County Public School System.

== History ==
Green Level High opened its doors for the 2019-2020 school year. Before Green Level formally opened, it housed students of Apex High School due to renovations being done at Apex High. The North Carolina State Senate passed House Bill 55 so that Apex, North Carolina police could have jurisdiction at Green Level High, since the school was serving as a temporary location for Apex High students.

The school is four stories tall and has a capacity for 2,262 students.

== Student population ==
For the 2023–2024 school year, the student population was 2,149. Of those students, 837 (38.9%) were White, 974 (45.3%) Asian, 129 (6%) Hispanic, 117 (5.4%) Black, 79 (3.7%) were two or more races, 8 (0.4%) American Indian, and 5 (0.2%) Native Hawaiian/Pacific Islander.

121 or 5.6% of the students were eligible for the free lunch program and 13 for the reduced-price lunch program.

== Faculty ==
The faculty includes the full-time equivalent of 106.98 teachers. The student/teacher ratio is 20.09 to 1.

Before the school opened in 2019, Karen Summers, principal of Green Hope High School, was made principal of Green Level. Upon her retirement in October 2026, Elizabeth Hanna succeeded her as principal.

== Academics ==
=== Curriculum ===
Green Level High School included grades 9 through 12. Student may take Advanced Placement courses.

=== Ratings ===
Niche gives Green Level a score of A+ and a rank of #18 in North Carolina. (Updated April 30, 2023)

== Student life ==
=== Athletics ===
Green Level High School is a member of the North Carolina High School Athletic Association (NCHSAA) and are classified as a 8A school. The school is a part of the Quad City Seven 8A Conference.

The school has the following co-ed sports teams: varsity competitive cheer, varsity cross country, varsity indoor track, varsity swimming, varsity track, and varsity sideline cheer.

Sport teams for women include varsity basketball, junior varsity basketball, varsity golf, varsity gymnastics, varsity lacrosse, junior varsity lacrosse, varsity soccer, junior varsity soccer, varsity softball, junior varsity softball, varsity tennis, varsity volleyball, and junior varsity volleyball.

Men's sport teams include varsity baseball, junior varsity baseball, varsity basketball, junior varsity basketball, varsity football, junior varsity football, varsity golf, varsity lacrosse, junior varsity lacrosse, varsity soccer, junior varsity soccer, varsity tennis, and varsity wrestling.

==== State championships ====
Green Level has won the following NCHSAA team state championships:

- Volleyball: 2022 (4A)
- Men's Lacrosse: 2024 (4A)

=== Clubs and organizations ===
Green Level has several concert bands (Placement determined by skill, with the lowest being concert band, then symphonic band, and the highest being the wind ensemble) as well as a marching band. They have three indoor ensembles, with one Indoor Percussion ensemble and two Winter Guard ensembles (a junior varsity and varsity team). They also have two Jazz bands that require an audition in order to be placed in one of said bands.

The school also has several choral groups. The Level Singers and the Tenor Bass Chorus do not require auditions, while the Advanced Treble Chorus and Green Level Acapella both require auditions. The former three are classes, and the latter is an extracurricular.

=== Mascot and colors ===
The mascot of Green Level High School is Mator the Gator. The school's colors are navy blue, lime green, and white.

=== Publications ===
The student newspaper is called The Gator's Eye. The school's yearbook is the Equilibrium.
