= 2025–26 NCAA Division I men's basketball rankings =

Rankings for the 2025–26 NCAA Division I men's basketball season

- Season: 2025–26
- NCAA Tournament: 2026
- Preseason No. 1: Purdue
- NCAA Tournament Champions: Michigan
NCAA Division I men's basketball rankings
← 2024–25

Two human polls make up the 2025–26 NCAA Division I men's basketball rankings, the AP poll and the Coaches Poll, in addition to various publications' preseason polls.

== Legend ==
	Increase in ranking
	Decrease in ranking
	New to rankings from previous week
	No movement from previous week
Italics	Number of first-place votes
(#–#)	Win–loss record
т	Tied with team above or below also with this symbol

== AP poll ==
	Preseason Oct 13	Week 2 Nov 10	Week 3 Nov 17	Week 4 Nov 24	Week 5 Dec 1	Week 6 Dec 8	Week 7 Dec 15	Week 8 Dec 22	Week 9 Dec 29^{[a]}	Week 10 Jan 5	Week 11 Jan 12	Week 12 Jan 19	Week 13 Jan 26	Week 14 Feb 2	Week 15 Feb 9	Week 16 Feb 16	Week 17 Feb 23	Week 18 Mar 2	Week 19 Mar 9	Week 20 Mar 16	Final Apr 7	
1.	Purdue (35)	Houston (2–0) (18)	Purdue (4–0) (44)	Purdue (6–0) (46)	Purdue (7–0) (40)	Arizona (8–0) (33)	Arizona (9–0) (42)	Arizona (11–0) (38)	Arizona (12–0) (38)	Arizona (14–0) (32)	Arizona (16–0) (60)	Arizona (18–0) (61)	Arizona (20–0) (60)	Arizona (22–0) (59)	Arizona (23–0) (59)	Michigan (24–1) (60)	Duke (25–2) (56)	Duke (27–2) (55)	Duke (29–2) (56)	Duke (32–2) (50)	Michigan (37–3) (57)	1.
2.	Houston (16)	Purdue (2–0) (36)	Houston (4–0) (12)	Arizona (5–0) (11)	Arizona (7–0) (6)	Michigan (8–0) (19)	Michigan (10–0) (15)	Michigan (11–0) (19)	Michigan (11–0) (19)	Michigan (13–0) (29)	Iowa State (16–0) (1)	UConn (18–1)	UConn (19–1)	Michigan (20–1)	Michigan (22–1)	Houston (23–2) (1)	Arizona (25–2) (5)	Arizona (27–2) (4)	Arizona (29–2) (4)	Arizona (32–2) (7)	UConn (34–6)	2.
3.	Florida (8)	UConn (2–0) (3)	UConn (4–0) (2)	Houston (5–0) (4)	Michigan (7–0) (15)	Duke (10–0) (7)	Duke (10–0) (3)	Iowa State (12–0) (1)	Iowa State (12–0) (1)	Iowa State (14–0)	UConn (16–1)	Michigan (16–1)	Michigan (18–1)	UConn (21–1)	Houston (21–2)	Duke (23–2)	Michigan (25–2)	Michigan (27–2)	Michigan (29–2) (1)	Michigan (31–3)	Arizona (36–3)	3.
4.	UConn (2)	Duke (2–0) (2)	Arizona (4–0) (2)	Duke (7–0)	Duke (8–0)	Iowa State (9–0) (1)	Iowa State (11–0) (1)	UConn (12–1)	UConn (12–1)	UConn (14–1)	Michigan (14–1)	Purdue (17–1)	Duke (18-1)	Duke (20–1)	Duke (21–2)	Arizona (23–2)	Iowa State (23–4)	UConn (27–3)	Florida (25–6)	Florida (26–7)	Duke (35–3)	4.
5.	St. John's	Arizona (2–0)	Duke (4–0) (1)	UConn (5–1)	UConn (6–1)	UConn (8–1)	UConn (10–1)	Purdue (11–1)	Purdue (11–1)	Purdue (13–1)	Purdue (15–1)	Duke (17–1)	Nebraska (20–0)	Illinois (19-3)	Iowa State (21–2)	UConn (24–2)	Houston (23–4)	Florida (23–6)	Houston (26–5)	Houston (28–6)	Illinois (28–9)	5.
6.	Duke	Michigan (1–0) (1)	Louisville (4–0)	Louisville (5–0)	Louisville (7–0)	Purdue (8–1)	Purdue (10–1)	Duke (11–1)	Duke (11–1)	Duke (13–1)	Duke (15–1)	Houston (17–1)	Gonzaga (21–1)	Gonzaga (22–1)	UConn (22–2)	Iowa State (22–3)	UConn (25–3)	Iowa State (24–5)	UConn (27–4)	Iowa State (27–7)	Purdue (30–9)	6.
7.	Michigan	BYU (2–0)	Michigan (3–0)	Michigan (4–0)	Michigan State (7–0)	Houston (8–1)	Gonzaga (10–1)	Gonzaga (12–1)	Gonzaga (13–1)	Houston (13–1)	Houston (15–1)	Nebraska (18–0)	Michigan State (18–2)	Iowa State (20–2)	Nebraska (21–2)	Purdue (21–4)	Florida (21–6)	Houston (24–5)	Iowa State (25–6)	UConn (29–5)	Houston (30–7)	7.
8.	BYU	Alabama (2–0) (1)	Illinois (4–0)	Alabama (3–1)	Houston (7–1)	Gonzaga (9–1)	Houston (10–1)	Houston (11–1)	Houston (11–1)	Gonzaga (16–1)	Nebraska (16–0)	Gonzaga (19–1)	Iowa State (18–2)	Houston (19–2)	Illinois (20–4)	Kansas (19–6)	Purdue (22–5)	Michigan State (24–5)	Michigan State (25–6)	Purdue (27–8)	Iowa State (29–8)	8.
9.	Kentucky	Kentucky (2–0)	BYU (3–1)	BYU (4–1)	BYU (6–1)	Michigan State (8–1)	Michigan State (9–1)	Michigan State (11–1)	Michigan State (11–1)	BYU (13–1)	Gonzaga (17–1)	Iowa State (16–2)	Illinois (17–3)	Nebraska (20–2)	Kansas (18–5)	Nebraska (22–3)	Gonzaga (27–2)	Nebraska (25–4)	Illinois (24–7)	Virginia (29–5)	Florida (27–8)	9.
10.	Texas Tech	Florida (1–1)	Florida (3–1)	Florida (4–1)	Iowa State (7–0)	BYU (7–1)	BYU (9–1)	BYU (11–1)	BYU (12–1)	Nebraska (14–0)	Vanderbilt (16–0)	Michigan State (16–2)	Houston (17–2)	Michigan State (19–3)	Michigan State (20–4)	Illinois (21–5)	Illinois (22–6)	Texas Tech (22–7)	Virginia (27–4)	St. John's (28–6)	St. John's (30–7)	10.
11.	Louisville	Texas Tech (2–0)	Alabama (2–1)	Michigan State (5–0)	Gonzaga (7–1)	Louisville (8–1)	Louisville (9–1)	Vanderbilt (12–0)	Vanderbilt (12–0)	Vanderbilt (14–0)	BYU (15–1)	Illinois (15–3)	Texas Tech (16–4)	Kansas (16–5)	North Carolina (19–4)	Gonzaga (25–2)	Virginia (24–3)	Illinois (22–7)	Nebraska (26–5)	Michigan State (25–7)	Michigan State (27–8)	11.
12.	UCLA	Louisville (2–0)	Kentucky (3–1)	Gonzaga (5–0)	Alabama (5–2)	Alabama (7–2)	North Carolina (9–1)	North Carolina (11–1)	North Carolina (12–1)	Michigan State (12–2)	Michigan State (14–2)	Texas Tech (14–4)	Purdue (17–3)	Purdue (18–4)	Gonzaga (23–2)	Florida (19–6)	Nebraska (23–4)	Gonzaga (28–3)	Gonzaga (28–3)	Gonzaga (30–3)	Tennessee (25–12)	12.
13.	Arizona	St. John's (1–1)	Gonzaga (4–0)	Illinois (5–1)	Tennessee (7–1)	Illinois (7–2)	Vanderbilt (10–0)	Nebraska (12–0)	Nebraska (12–0)	Alabama (11–3)	Illinois (13–3)	BYU (16–2)	BYU (17–2)	Texas Tech (16–5)	Purdue (19–4)	Texas Tech (19–6)	Michigan State (22–5)	Virginia (25–4)	St. John's (25–6)	Illinois (24–8)	Arkansas (28–9)	13.
14.	Arkansas	Illinois (2–0)	St. John's (2–1)	St. John's (3–1)	Illinois (6–2)	North Carolina (8–1)	Arkansas (8–2)	Alabama (9–3)	Alabama (9–3)	Texas Tech (11–3)	North Carolina (14–2)	Virginia (16–2)	Kansas (15–5)	North Carolina (17–4)	Florida (17–6)	Virginia (22–3)	Kansas (20–7)	Kansas (21–8)	Kansas (22–9)	Arkansas (26–8)	Nebraska (28–7)	14.
15.	Alabama	UCLA (2–0)	Texas Tech (3–1)	Iowa State (4–0)	Florida (5–2)	Vanderbilt (9–0)	Nebraska (11–0)	Texas Tech (9–3)	Texas Tech (10–3)	Arkansas (11–3)	Texas Tech (12–4)	Vanderbilt (16–2)	Arkansas (15–5)	Vanderbilt (19–3)	Virginia (20–3)	Michigan State (20–5)	St. John's (22–5)	Purdue (22–7)	Alabama (23–8)	Nebraska (26–6)	Iowa (24–13)	15.
16.	Iowa State	Iowa State (2–0)	Iowa State (3–0)	North Carolina (5–0)	North Carolina (6–1)	Texas Tech (7–2)	Alabama (7–3)	Louisville (10–2)	Louisville (10–2)	Illinois (11–3)	Virginia (14–2)	Florida (13–5)	North Carolina (16–4)	BYU (17–4)	Texas Tech (17–6)	North Carolina (20–5)	Texas Tech (20–7)	Alabama (22–7)	Texas Tech (22–9)	Vanderbilt (26–8)	Alabama (25–10)	16.
17.	Illinois	Michigan State (2–0)	Michigan State (3–0)	Tennessee (5–0)	Vanderbilt (8–0)	Arkansas (7–2)	Kansas (8–3)	Kansas (9–3)	Kansas (10–3)	North Carolina (13–2)	Arkansas (12–4)	Alabama (13–5)	Virginia (16–3)	Florida (16–6)	St. John's (18–5)	St. John's (20–5)	Alabama (20–7)	North Carolina (23–6)	Arkansas (23–8)	Kansas (23–10)	Virginia (30–6)	17.
18.	Tennessee	North Carolina (2–0)	North Carolina (4–0)	UCLA (5–1)	Kentucky (5–2)	Florida (5–3)	Illinois (8–3)	Arkansas (9–3)	Arkansas (9–3)	Georgia (13–1)	Alabama (11–5)	Clemson (16–3)	Vanderbilt (17–3)	Virginia (18–3)	Saint Louis (23–1)	Saint Louis (24–1)	North Carolina (21–6)	St. John's (23–6)	Purdue (24–7)	Alabama (23–9)	Gonzaga (31–4)	18.
19.	Kansas	Gonzaga (2–0)	UCLA (3–1)	Kentucky (4–2)	Texas Tech (6–2)	Kansas (7–3)	Texas Tech (7–3)	Tennessee (9–3)	Tennessee (9–3)	Iowa (12–2)	Florida (11–5)	Kansas (13–5)	Florida (14–6)	Saint Louis (21–1)	Vanderbilt (19–4)	Vanderbilt (21–4)	BYU (20–7)	Miami (OH) (29–0)	North Carolina (24–7)	Wisconsin (24–10)	Vanderbilt (27–9)	19.
20.	Auburn	Tennessee (2–0)	Tennessee (3–0)	Texas Tech (4–2)	Auburn (6–2)	Tennessee (7–3)	Tennessee (7–3)	Illinois (8–3)	Illinois (9–3)	Louisville (11–3)	Louisville (12–4)	Arkansas (13–5)	Louisville (14–5)	Clemson (18–4)	Clemson (20–4)	Arkansas (19–6)	Arkansas (20–7)	Arkansas (21–8)	Miami (OH) (31–0)	Texas Tech (22–10)	Kansas (24–11)	20.
21.	Gonzaga	Arkansas (1–1)	Arkansas (3–1)	Auburn (4–1)	Kansas (6–2)	Auburn (7–3)	Auburn (8–3)	Virginia (10–1)	Virginia (11–1)	Tennessee (10–4)	Georgia (14–2)	Georgia (15–3)	Saint Louis (19–1)	Arkansas (16–6)	Arkansas (17–6)	Louisville (19–6)	Miami (OH) (27–0)	Saint Mary's (27–4)	Saint Mary's (27–4)	North Carolina (24–8)	Texas Tech (23–11)	21.
22.	Michigan State	Auburn (2–0)	Auburn (3–1)	Arkansas (5–1)	Indiana (7–0)	St. John's (5–3)	St. John's (6–3)	Florida (8–4)	Florida (8–4)	Kansas (10–4)	Clemson (14–3)	North Carolina (14–4)	Clemson (17–4)	St. John's (16–5)	BYU (17–6)	Miami (OH) (25–0)	Tennessee (20–7)	Miami (FL) (23–6)	Vanderbilt (24–7)	Saint Mary's (27–5)	Texas (21–15)	22.
23.	Creighton	Creighton (1–0)	Wisconsin (3–0)	NC State (4–0)	St. John's (4–3)	Nebraska (9–0)	Florida (6–4)т	Georgia (10–1)	Georgia (11–1)	Virginia (12–2)	Utah State (14–1)	Louisville (13–5)	Alabama (13–6)	Miami (OH) (22–0)	Miami (OH) (24–0)	BYU (19–6)	Saint Louis (25–2)	Tennessee (20–9)	Wisconsin (22–9)	Louisville (23–10)	Louisville (24–11)	23.
24.	Wisconsin	Wisconsin (2–0)	Kansas (3–1)	Vanderbilt (5–0)	USC (7–0)	Virginia (8–1)	Virginia (9–1)т	USC (12–1)	USC (12–1)	SMU (12–2)	Tennessee (11–5)	Saint Louis (17–1)	Miami (OH) (20–0)	Louisville (15–6)	Louisville (17–6)	Wisconsin (18–7)	Louisville (20–7)	Vanderbilt (22–7)	Louisville (22–9)	Tennessee (22–11)	Miami (FL) (26–9)	24.
25.	North Carolina	Kansas (1–1)	NC State (3–0)	Indiana (5–0)	Arkansas (5–2)	UCLA (7–2)	Georgia (9–1)	Iowa (10–2)	Iowa (10–2)	UCF (12–1)	Seton Hall (14–2)	Miami (OH) (19–0)	St. John's (15–5)	Tennessee (15–6)	Kentucky (17–7)	Alabama (18–7)	Vanderbilt (21–6)	Saint Louis (26–3)	Tennessee (21–10)	Miami (FL) (25–8)	Wisconsin (24–11)	25.
	Preseason Oct 13	Week 2 Nov 10	Week 3 Nov 17	Week 4 Nov 24	Week 5 Dec 1	Week 6 Dec 8	Week 7 Dec 15	Week 8 Dec 22	Week 9 Dec 29^{[a]}	Week 10 Jan 5	Week 11 Jan 12	Week 12 Jan 19	Week 13 Jan 26	Week 14 Feb 2	Week 15 Feb 9	Week 16 Feb 16	Week 17 Feb 23	Week 18 Mar 2	Week 19 Mar 9	Week 20 Mar 16	Final Apr 7	
		None	Dropped: Creighton (2–1)	Dropped: Wisconsin (4–1); Kansas (3–2)	Dropped: UCLA (5–2); NC State (5–2)	Dropped: Kentucky (5–4); Indiana (7–2); USC (8–1)	Dropped: UCLA (7–3)	Dropped: Auburn (8–4); St. John's (7–4)	None	Dropped: Florida (9–5); USC (12–2)	Dropped: Iowa (12–4); Kansas (11–5); SMU (12–4); UCF (13–2)	Dropped: Utah State (15–2); Tennessee (12–6); Seton Hall (14–4)	Dropped: Georgia (16–4)	Dropped: Alabama (14–7)	Dropped: Tennessee (16–7)	Dropped: Clemson (20–6); Kentucky (17–8)	Dropped: Wisconsin (19–8)	Dropped: BYU (20–9); Louisville (20–9)	Dropped: Miami (FL) (24–7); Saint Louis (27–4)	Dropped: Miami (OH) (31–1)	Dropped: North Carolina (24–9); Saint Mary's (27–6)	

^{a} The AP Poll skipped Week 9, so Week 8 rankings were carried over.

== USA Today Coaches Poll ==
	Preseason Oct 22	Week 2 Nov 10	Week 3 Nov 17	Week 4 Nov 24	Week 5 Dec 1	Week 6 Dec 8	Week 7 Dec 15	Week 8 Dec 22	Week 9 Dec 29	Week 10 Jan 5	Week 11 Jan 12	Week 12 Jan 19	Week 13 Jan 26	Week 14 Feb 2	Week 15 Feb 9	Week 16 Feb 16	Week 17 Feb 23	Week 18 Mar 2	Week 19 Mar 9	Week 20 Mar 15	Final Apr 7	
1.	Purdue (18)	Purdue (2−0) (21)	Purdue (4−0) (20)	Purdue (6−0) (23)	Purdue (7−0) (21)	Michigan (8−0) (17)	Michigan (10−0) (16)	Michigan (11−0) (16)	Michigan (11–0) (20)	Michigan (13–0) (24)	Arizona (16–0) (29)	Arizona (18–0) (31)	Arizona (20–0) (31)	Arizona (22–0) (31)	Arizona (23–0) (30)	Michigan (24–1) (31)	Duke (25–2) (27)	Duke (27–2) (28)	Duke (29–2) (28)	Duke (32–2) (26)	Michigan (37–3) (31)	1.
2.	Houston (12)	Houston (2−0) (7)	Houston (4−0) (9)	Houston (5−0) (2)	Michigan (7−0) (6)	Arizona (8−0) (11)	Arizona (9−0) (14)	Arizona (11−0) (11)	Arizona (12–0) (11)	Arizona (14–0) (7)	Iowa State (16–0) (1)	Michigan (16–1)	Michigan (18–1)	Michigan (20–1)	Michigan (20–1) (1)	Houston (23–2)	Arizona (25–2) (4)	Arizona (27–2) (3)	Arizona (29–2) (3)	Arizona (32–2) (5)	UConn (34–6)	2.
3.	Florida (1)	UConn (2−0)	UConn (4−0)	Arizona (5−0) (5)	Arizona (7−0) (3)	Duke (10−0) (2)	Duke (10−0) (1)	Iowa State (12−0)	Iowa State (12–0)	Iowa State (14–0)	Michigan (14–1) (1)	UConn (18–1)	UConn (19–1)	UConn (21–1)	Houston (21–2)	Duke (23–2)	Michigan (25–2)	Michigan (27–2)	Michigan (29–2)	Michigan (31–3)	Arizona (36–3)	3.
4.	UConn	Duke (2−0) (1)	Duke (4−0) (2)	Duke (7−0) (1)	Duke (8−0) (1)	Iowa State (9−0) (1)	Iowa State (11−0)	UConn (12−1)	UConn (12–1)	UConn (14–1)	UConn (16–1)	Purdue (17–1)	Duke (18–1)	Duke (20–1)	Iowa State (21–2)	Arizona (23–2)	Houston (23–4)	UConn (27–3)	Florida (25–6)	Florida (26-7)	Duke (35–3)	4.
5.	Duke	Michigan (1−0)	Arizona (4−0)	Louisville (5−0)	UConn (6−1)	UConn (8–1)	UConn (10–1)	Purdue (11−1)	Duke (11–1)	Purdue (13–1)	Purdue (15–1)	Duke (17–1)	Nebraska (20–0)	Gonzaga (22–1)	UConn (22–2)	UConn (24–2)	Iowa State (23–4)	Florida (23–6)	Houston (26–5)	Houston (28–6)	Illinois (28–9)	5.
6.	St. John's	Arizona (2−0)	Michigan (3−0)т	Michigan (4−0)	Louisville (7−0)	Purdue (8–1)	Purdue (10–1)	Duke (11−1)	Purdue (11–1)	Duke (13–1)	Duke (15–1)	Houston (17–1)	Gonzaga (20–1)	Illinois (19–3)	Duke (21–2)	Iowa State (22–3)	UConn (25–3)	Houston (24–5)	UConn (27–4)	Iowa State (27–7)	Houston (30–7)	6.
7.	Michigan	BYU (2−0)	Louisville (4−0)т	UConn (5−1)	Houston (7−1)	Gonzaga (9–1)	Gonzaga (10–1)	Gonzaga (12−1)	Gonzaga (13–1)	Houston (13–1)	Houston (15–1)	Nebraska (18–0)	Houston (17–2)	Iowa State (20–2)	Illinois (20–4)	Purdue (21–4)	Florida (21–6)	Iowa State (24–5)	Iowa State (25–6)	UConn (29–5)	Purdue (30–9)	7.
8.	BYU	Kentucky (2−0)	Illinois (4−0)	Florida (4−1)	Michigan State (7−0)	Houston (8–1)	Houston (10–1)	Houston (11−1)	Houston (11–1)	Gonzaga (16–1)	Vanderbilt (16–0)	Gonzaga (19–1)	Michigan State (18–2)	Houston (19–2)	Nebraska (21–2)	Gonzaga (25–2)	Purdue (22–5)	Michigan State (24–5)	Michigan State (25–6)	Virginia (29–5)	Iowa State (29–8)	8.
9.	Kentucky	Alabama (2−0)	Florida (3−1)	Alabama (4−1)	Iowa State (7−0)	Michigan State (8–1)	Michigan State (9–1)	Michigan State (11−1)	Michigan State (11–1)	BYU (13–1)	Gonzaga (17–1)	Iowa State (16–2)	Iowa State (18–2)	Nebraska (20–2)	Kansas (18–5)	Nebraska (22–3)	Gonzaga (27–2)	Nebraska (25–4)	Illinois (24–7)	St. John's (28–6)	Florida (27–8)	9.
10.	Louisville	Florida (1−1)	BYU (3−1)	Gonzaga (5−0)	BYU (6−1)	BYU (7–1)	BYU (9–1)	BYU (11−1)	BYU (12–1)	Vanderbilt (14–0)	Nebraska (16–0)	Michigan State (16–2)	Illinois (17–3)	Michigan State (19–3)	Michigan State (20–4)	Illinois (21–5)	Nebraska (23–4)	Texas Tech (22–7)	Nebraska (26–5)	Gonzaga (30–3)	St. John's (30–7)	10.
11.	Texas Tech	Texas Tech (2−0)	Alabama (2−1)	BYU (4−1)	Gonzaga (7−1)	Louisville (8–1)	Louisville (9–1)	Vanderbilt (12−0)	Vanderbilt (12–0)	Nebraska (14–0)	BYU (15–1)	Illinois (15–3)	Texas Tech (16–4)	Kansas (16–5)	Gonzaga (23–2)	Florida (19–6)	Illinois (22–6)	Illinois (22–7)	Virginia (27–4)	Michigan State (25–7)	Michigan State (27–8)	11.
12.	UCLA	Louisville (2−0)	Gonzaga (4−0)	Michigan State (5−0)	Alabama (5−2)	Alabama (7–2)	Vanderbilt (10−0)	North Carolina (11−1)	North Carolina (12–1)	Alabama (11–3)	Michigan State (14–2)	Texas Tech (14–4)	Purdue (17–3)	Purdue (18–4)	Purdue (19–4)	Kansas (19–6)	Virginia (24–3)	Gonzaga (28–3)	Gonzaga (28–3)	Illinois (24–8)	Tennessee (25–12)	12.
13.	Arizona	St. John's (1−1)	Kentucky (3−1)	Iowa State (4−0)	Tennessee (7−1)	Illinois (7–2)	North Carolina (9–1)	Nebraska (12−0)	Nebraska (12–0)т	Michigan State (12–2)	Illinois (13–3)	BYU (16–2)	BYU (17–2)	Texas Tech (16–5)	North Carolina (19–4)	Texas Tech (19–6)	Michigan State (22–5)	Virginia (25–4)	St. John's (25–6)	Purdue (27-8)	Arkansas (28–9)	13.
14.	Illinois	Illinois (2−0)	Iowa State (3−0)	Illinois (5−1)	Florida (5−2)	Vanderbilt (9–0)	Arkansas (8–2)	Louisville (10−2)	Louisville (10–2)т	Texas Tech (11–3)	Texas Tech (12–4)	Vanderbilt (16–2)	Kansas (15–5)	BYU (17–4)	Florida (17–6)	Virginia (22–3)	Kansas (20–7)	Purdue (22–7)	Texas Tech (22–9)	Nebraska (26–6)	Nebraska (28–7)	14.
15.	Arkansas	UCLA (2−0)	Texas Tech (3−0)	St. John's (3−1)	Illinois (6−2)	North Carolina (8–1)	Nebraska (11–0)	Alabama (9−3)	Alabama (9–3)	Arkansas (11–3)	North Carolina (14–2)	Virginia (16–2)	Vanderbilt (17–3)	Vanderbilt (19–3)	Virginia (20–3)	Michigan State (20–5)	St. John's (22–5)	Kansas (21–8)	Alabama (23–8)	Arkansas (26–8)	Virginia (30–6)	15.
16.	Alabama	Iowa State (2−0)	St. John's (2−1)	Tennessee (5−0)	Vanderbilt (8−0)	Texas Tech (7–2)	Alabama (7–3)	Texas Tech (9−3)	Texas Tech (10–3)	Illinois (11–3)	Virginia (14–2)	Florida (13–5)	Arkansas (15–5)	Florida (16–6)	Texas Tech (17–6)	St. John's (20–5)	Texas Tech (20–7)	Alabama (22–7)	Kansas (22–9)	Vanderbilt (26–8)	Alabama (25–10)	16.
17.	Tennessee	Michigan State (2−0)	Tennessee (3−0)	North Carolina (5−0)	North Carolina (6−1)	Arkansas (7–2)	Kansas (8–3)	Kansas (9–3)	Kansas (10–3)	North Carolina (13–2)	Arkansas (12–4)	Alabama (13–5)	Virginia (17–3)	Virginia (18–3)	St. John's (18–5)	Arkansas (19–6)	Arkansas (20–7)	St. John's (23–6)	Arkansas (23–8)	Kansas (23–10)	Vanderbilt (27–9)	17.
18.	Iowa State	Tennessee (2−0)	Michigan State (3−0)	Kentucky (4−2)	Kentucky (5−2)	Florida (5–3)	Illinois (8–3)	Arkansas (9−3)	Arkansas (9–3)	Louisville (11–3)	Alabama (11–5)	Clemson (16–3)	North Carolina (16–4)	North Carolina (17–4)	Clemson (20–4)	Vanderbilt (21–4)	Alabama (20–7)	North Carolina (23–6)	Purdue (23–8)	Alabama (23–9)	Gonzaga (31–4)	18.
19.	Kansas	Gonzaga (2−0)	North Carolina (4−0)	UCLA (5−1)	Texas Tech (6−2)т	Kansas (7–3)	Texas Tech (7–3)	Illinois (8−3)	Illinois (9–3)	Iowa (12–2)	Louisville (12–4)	Kansas (13–5)	Clemson (17–4)	Clemson (18–4)	Saint Louis (23–1)	Saint Louis (24–1)	North Carolina (21–6)	Arkansas (21–8)	North Carolina (24–7)	Texas Tech (22–10)	Iowa (24–13)	19.
20.	Gonzaga	North Carolina (2−0)	UCLA (3−1)	Texas Tech (4−2)	Indiana (7−0)т	Tennessee (7–3)	St. John's (6–3)	Tennessee (9−3)	Tennessee (9–3)	Georgia (13–1)	Florida (11–5)	Arkansas (13–5)	Louisville (14–5)	Saint Louis (21–1)	Vanderbilt (19–4)	North Carolina (20–5)	Louisville (20–7)	Miami (OH) (29–0)	Miami (OH) (31–0)	Wisconsin (24–10)	Kansas (24–11)	20.
21.	Michigan State	Arkansas (1−1)	Wisconsin (3−0)	Arkansas (5−1)	Kansas (6−2)	St. John's (5–3)	Florida (6–4)	Virginia (10−1)	Virginia (11–1)	Kansas (10–4)	Clemson (14–3)	Louisville (13–5)	Florida (14–6)	Arkansas (16–6)	Arkansas (17–6)	Louisville (19–6)	Vanderbilt (21–6)	Saint Mary's (27–4)	Saint Mary's (27–4)	North Carolina (24–8)	Texas Tech (23–11)	21.
22.	Auburn	Wisconsin (2−0)	Arkansas (3−1)	NC State (4−0)	St. John's (4−3)	Nebraska (9–0)	Virginia (9–1)	Florida (8−4)	Florida (8–4)	Tennessee (10–4)	Georgia (14–2)	Georgia (15–3)	Saint Louis (19–1)	St. John's (16–5)	BYU (17–6)	BYU (19–6)	Tennessee (20–7)	Vanderbilt (22–7)	Vanderbilt (24–7)	Saint Mary's (27–5)	Miami (FL) (26–9)	22.
23.	Creighton	Creighton (1−0)	Kansas (3−1)	Vanderbilt (5−0)	Arkansas (5−2)	Iowa (8–1)	Tennessee (7–3)	Iowa (10−2)	Iowa (10–2)	Virginia (12–2)	Iowa (12–4)	Saint Louis (17–1)	Alabama (13–6)	Louisville (15–6)	Louisville (17–6)	Miami (OH) (25–0)	BYU (20–7)	Miami (FL) (23–6)	Wisconsin (22–9)	Miami (FL) (25–8)	Louisville (24–11)	23.
24.	Wisconsin	Kansas (1−1)	Vanderbilt (4−0)	Indiana (5−0)	Auburn (6−2)	Auburn (7–3)	Auburn (8–3)	Georgia (10−1)	Georgia (11–1)	Villanova (12–2)	Utah State (14–1)	North Carolina (14–4)	St. John's (15–5)	Miami (OH) (22–0)	Miami (OH) (24–0)	Clemson (20–6)	Saint Louis (25–2)	Saint Louis (26–3)	Louisville (22–9)	Louisville (23–10)	Texas (21–15)	24.
25.	North Carolina	Auburn (2−0)	Indiana (4−0)	Auburn (4−1)	Iowa (7−0)	Virginia (8–1)	Iowa (8–2)	USC (12−1)	St. John's (8–4)	SMU (12–2)	Kansas (11–5)	St. John's (13–5)	Miami (OH) (20–0)т Iowa (14–5)т	Texas A&M (17–4)	Iowa (18–5)	Wisconsin (18–7)	Miami (OH) (27–0)	Tennessee (20–9)	Miami (FL) (24–7)	Tennessee (22–11)	Wisconsin (24–11)	25.
	Preseason Oct 22	Week 2 Nov 10	Week 3 Nov 17	Week 4 Nov 24	Week 5 Dec 1	Week 6 Dec 8	Week 7 Dec 15	Week 8 Dec 22	Week 9 Dec 29	Week 10 Jan 5	Week 11 Jan 12	Week 12 Jan 19	Week 13 Jan 26	Week 14 Feb 2	Week 15 Feb 9	Week 16 Feb 16	Week 17 Feb 23	Week 18 Mar 2	Week 19 Mar 9	Week 20 Mar 15	Final Apr 7	
		None	Dropped: Creighton (2–1); Auburn (3–1)	Dropped: Wisconsin (4–1); Kansas (3–2)	Dropped: UCLA (5–2); NC State (5–2)	Dropped: Kentucky (5–4); Indiana (7–2)	None	Dropped: St. John's (7–4); Auburn (8–4)	Dropped: USC (12–1)	Dropped: Florida (9–5); St. John's (9–4)	Dropped: Tennessee (11–5); Villanova (13–3); SMU (12–4)	Dropped: Iowa (13–5); Utah State (15–2)	Dropped: Georgia (14–5)	Dropped: Alabama (14–7); Iowa (16–5)	Dropped: Texas A&M (17–6)	Dropped: Iowa (18–7)	Dropped: Clemson (20–8); Wisconsin (19–8)	Dropped: Louisville (20–9); BYU (20–9)	Dropped: Saint Louis (27–4); Tennessee (21–10)	Dropped: Miami (OH) (31–1)	Dropped: North Carolina (24–9); Saint Mary's (27–6)	

== See also ==
- 2025–26 NCAA Division I women's basketball rankings
