= Northside Christian School (Westerville, Ohio) =

Location
- 2655 W. Schrock Road; Westerville, (Franklin County), Ohio 43081; United States; 40°6′35″N 82°56′53″W

Information
- Type: Private, Coeducational preschool elementary school high school
- Religious affiliation: Christian
- Established: 1971
- School district: central
- Director: Jeff Peterson
- Principal: Sharon Ross, Interim
- Chaplain: Pastor Eric D. Sipe
- Grades: Pre-K-12
- Average class size: 15
- Colors: Royal Blue and White
- Slogan: "Learn Christ, Love Christ, Live Christ"
- Athletics conference: Mid-Ohio Christian Athletic League
- Sports: soccer, volleyball, cross country, Boys JV basketball, Boys Varsity Basketball, Girls Varsity Basketball, track, cheerleading
- Mascot: Maxwell the Lion
- Team name: Lions
- Rival: Tree of Life Christian
- Yearbook: Reflections
- Website: ncslions.org

Northside Christian School is a private school located in Westerville, Ohio. It was founded in 1971 as a ministry of Calvary Bible Church in Clintonville.

Northside Christian School (NCS) offers grades Pre-K through 12. The school is a ministry of Calvary Bible Church and is a member of Association of Christian Schools International (ACSI). NCS is a one-track school, with one class per grade level. The average class size is 18 students. NCS has over 50 staff members employed.

The school, as a ministry of Calvary Bible Church, abides by the doctrinal statement of the church, as found in its Constitution and Covenant.

Northside Christian competes in the Ohio High School Athletic Association (OHSAA), in the Mid-Ohio Christian Athletic League (MOCAL).

== Fine Arts ==
Art classes are available for Pre-K through 12th grades. Drama is presented on the secondary school level with occasional opportunities for elementary students.

== Sports ==
- Fall: Co-ed Soccer and Girls' Volleyball
- Winter: Boys' Basketball, Girls' Basketball, and Girls' Cheerleading
- Spring: Co-ed Track and Field, Boys' Baseball, Girls' Softball
