= 2025–26 Horizon League men's basketball season =

- League: NCAA Division I
- Sport: Men's basketball
- Teams: 11
- TV partner(s): ESPN+ ESPN2; ESPNU; ESPN

Regular season
- Season champions: Wright State
- Season MVP: DeSean Goode
- Top scorer: Corey Hadnot II

Tournament
- Champions: Wright State
- Runners-up: Detroit Mercy
- Finals MVP: TJ Burch

Basketball seasons
- ← 2024–25 2026–27 →

2025–26 Horizon League men's basketball standings
| | Conf. | | | | Overall |
| Team | W | | L | PCT | W | | L | PCT |
|---|---|---|---|---|---|---|---|---|
| Wright State † | 15 | – | 5 | .750 | 23 | – | 12 | .657 |
| Robert Morris | 13 | – | 7 | .650 | 22 | – | 11 | .667 |
| Detroit Mercy | 12 | – | 8 | .600 | 17 | – | 15 | .531 |
| Oakland | 12 | – | 8 | .600 | 16 | – | 16 | .500 |
| Green Bay | 12 | – | 8 | .600 | 18 | – | 15 | .545 |
| Purdue Fort Wayne | 11 | – | 9 | .550 | 17 | – | 15 | .531 |
| Northern Kentucky | 10 | – | 10 | .500 | 20 | – | 14 | .588 |
| Milwaukee | 8 | – | 12 | .400 | 12 | – | 20 | .375 |
| Youngstown State | 8 | – | 12 | .400 | 15 | – | 17 | .469 |
| Cleveland State | 6 | – | 14 | .300 | 11 | – | 22 | .333 |
| IU Indy | 3 | – | 17 | .150 | 7 | – | 25 | .219 |
† 2026 Horizon League tournament winner

The 2025–26 Horizon League men's basketball season began with practices in September 2025 and ended with the 2026 Horizon League men's basketball tournament in March 2026. This was the 46th season for Horizon League men's basketball, and the final season before the conference expands with Northern Illinois rejoining beginning in 2026–27.

== Head coaches ==
=== Coaching changes ===
- On March 30, 2025, Cleveland State head coach Daniyal Robinson was hired as the head coach of North Texas. On April 5, the Vikings hired Missouri assistant Rob Summers, who was an assistant at Cleveland State from 2019 to 2022, as their new head coach.
- On May 13, IU Indy fired first-year head coach Paul Corsaro after a 10–22 finish. On May 27, the Jaguars announced Division II West Liberty head coach Ben Howlett as his replacement.

=== Coaches ===
| Team | Head coach | Previous job | Season | Overall record | Horizon record | NCAA Tournaments |
|---|---|---|---|---|---|---|
| Cleveland State | Rob Summers | Missouri (asst.) | 1st | 0–0 (–) | 0–0 (–) | 0 |
| Detroit Mercy | Mark Montgomery | Michigan State (asst.) | 2nd | 8–24 (.250) | 4–16 (.200) | 0 |
| Green Bay | Doug Gottlieb | none | 2nd | 4–28 (.125) | 2–18 (.100) | 0 |
| IU Indy | Ben Howlett | West Liberty | 1st | 0–0 (–) | 0–0 (–) | 0 |
| Milwaukee | Bart Lundy | Queens | 4th | 63–38 (.624) | 40–20 (.667) | 0 |
| Northern Kentucky | Darrin Horn | Texas (asst.) | 7th | 114–76 (.600) | 75–41 (.647) | 2 |
| Oakland | Greg Kampe | Toledo (asst.) | 42nd | 710–544 (.566) | 128–81 (.612) | 1 |
| Purdue Fort Wayne | Jon Coffman | IPFW (asst.) | 12th | 197–154 (.561) | 104–92 (.531) | 0 |
| Robert Morris | Andrew Toole | Robert Morris (asst.) | 16th | 252–241 (.511) | 154–120 (.562) | 3 |
| Wright State | Clint Sargent | Wright State (asst.) | 2nd | 15–18 (.455) | 8–12 (.400) | 0 |
| Youngstown State | Ethan Faulkner | Youngstown State (asst.) | 2nd | 21–13 (.618) | 13–7 (.650) | 0 |

Notes:

- Season number includes 2025–26 season.
- Records are prior to 2025–26 season.

== Preseason ==
=== Preseason coaches poll ===
2025–26 Horizon League Preseason Coaches Poll
| Rank | Team | Points |
|---|---|---|
| 1 | Milwaukee | 428 (24) |
| 2 | Oakland | 384 (7) |
| 3 | Youngstown State | 364 (2) |
| 4 | Robert Morris | 345 (8) |
| 5 | Purdue Fort Wayne | 287 (1) |
| 6 | Northern Kentucky | 274 |
| 7 | Wright State | 221 |
| 8 | Cleveland State | 217 (2) |
| 9 | Detroit Mercy | 176 |
| 10 | IU Indy | 115 |
| 11 | Green Bay | 93 |
(#) first-place votes

=== Preseason All-Horizon League ===
| First team | Second team |
|---|---|
| Orlando Lovejoy, Detroit Mercy | Faizon Fields, Milwaukee |
| Marcus Hall, Green Bay | Seth Hubbard, Milwaukee |
| Amar Aguillard, Milwaukee | Dan Gherezgher, Northern Kentucky |
| Tuburu Naivalurua, Oakland | Corey Hadnot II, Purdue Fort Wayne |
| Cris Carroll, Youngstown State | DeSean Goode, Robert Morris |
Preseason Player of the Year: Tuburu Naivalurua, Oakland

== Regular season ==
=== Player of the Week awards ===
| Week | Player of the Week | School | Freshman of the Week | School |
|---|---|---|---|---|
| 1 | Cris Carroll | Youngstown State | Michael Cooper | Wright State |
| 2 | Corey Hadnot II | Purdue Fort Wayne | Maguire Mitchell | IU Indy |
| 3 | C.J. O’Hara | Green Bay | Ethan Elliott | Northern Kentucky |
| 4 | Brody Robinson | Oakland | Stevie Elam | Milwaukee |
| 5 | Brody Robinson (2) | Oakland | Michael Cooper (2) | Wright State |
| 6 | Corey Hadnot II (2) | Purdue Fort Wayne | Tyler Spratt | Detroit Mercy |
| 7 | Corey Hadnot II (3) | Purdue Fort Wayne | Josh Dixon | Milwaukee |
| 8 | Kyler D’Augustino | IU Indy | Michael Cooper (3) | Wright State |
| 9 | Isaac Garrett | Oakland | Kellen Pickett | Wright State |
| 10 | Solomon Callaghan | Wright State | Kellen Pickett (2) | Wright State |
| 11 | Mikale Stevenson | Purdue Fort Wayne | Kellen Pickett (3) | Wright State |
| 12 | Dayan Nessah | Cleveland State | Maguire Mitchell (2) | IU Indy |
| 13 | Dayan Nessah (2) | Cleveland State | Tyler Spratt (2) | Detroit Mercy |
| 14 | DeSean Goode | Robert Morris | Darius Livingston | Robert Morris |
| 15 | Ryan Prather Jr. | Robert Morris | Darius Livingston (2) | Robert Morris |
| 16 | Orlando Lovejoy | Detroit Mercy | Darius Livingston (3) | Robert Morris |
| 17 | Nikolaos Chitikoudis | Robert Morris | Stevie Elam (2) | Milwaukee |

| School | POTW | FOTW |
|---|---|---|
| Cleveland State | 2 | 0 |
| Detroit Mercy | 1 | 2 |
| Green Bay | 1 | 0 |
| IU Indy | 1 | 2 |
| Milwaukee | 0 | 3 |
| Northern Kentucky | 0 | 1 |
| Oakland | 3 | 0 |
| Purdue Fort Wayne | 4 | 0 |
| Robert Morris | 3 | 3 |
| Wright State | 1 | 6 |
| Youngstown State | 1 | 0 |

=== Conference matrix ===
| | CSU | DET | GB | IUI | MKE | NKU | OAK | PFW | RMU | WSU | YSU |
|---|---|---|---|---|---|---|---|---|---|---|---|
| vs. Cleveland State | – | 2–0 | 1–1 | 1–1 | 1–1 | 2–0 | 1–1 | 2–0 | 2–0 | 1–1 | 1–1 |
| vs. Detroit Mercy | 0–2 | – | 1–1 | 0–2 | 0–2 | 1–1 | 1–1 | 2–0 | 2–0 | 1–1 | 0–2 |
| vs. Green Bay | 1–1 | 1–1 | – | 0–2 | 1–1 | 0–2 | 1–1 | 0–2 | 1–1 | 2–0 | 1–1 |
| vs. IU Indy | 1–1 | 2–0 | 2–0 | – | 2–0 | 2–0 | 1–1 | 2–0 | 1–1 | 2–0 | 2–0 |
| vs. Milwaukee | 1–1 | 2–0 | 1–1 | 0–2 | – | 2–0 | 2–0 | 1–1 | 1–1 | 2–0 | 0–2 |
| vs. Northern Kentucky | 0–2 | 1–1 | 2–0 | 0–2 | 0–2 | – | 2–0 | 1–1 | 1–1 | 2–0 | 1–1 |
| vs. Oakland | 1–1 | 1–1 | 1–1 | 1–1 | 0–2 | 0–2 | – | 0–2 | 1–1 | 2–0 | 1–1 |
| vs. Purdue Fort Wayne | 0–2 | 0–2 | 2–0 | 0–2 | 1–1 | 1–1 | 2–0 | – | 0–2 | 2–0 | 1–1 |
| vs. Robert Morris | 0–2 | 0–2 | 1–1 | 1–1 | 1–1 | 1–1 | 1–1 | 2–0 | – | 0–2 | 0–2 |
| vs. Wright State | 1–1 | 1–1 | 0–2 | 0–2 | 0–2 | 0–2 | 0–2 | 0–2 | 2–0 | – | 1–1 |
| vs. Youngstown State | 1–1 | 2–0 | 1–1 | 0–2 | 2–0 | 1–1 | 1–1 | 1–1 | 2–0 | 1–1 | – |
| Total | 6–14 | 12–8 | 12–8 | 3–17 | 8–12 | 10–10 | 12–8 | 11–9 | 13–7 | 15–5 | 8–12 |

== Postseason ==
=== Horizon League tournament ===
The conference tournament was played from March 2 to March 10, 2026.

The tournament adopted a new format in 2026; instead of a traditional 11-team bracket with reseeding after each round, the new format includes a play-in for the bottom two teams by conference record, then a ten-team first round on campus sites. The five winners then advance to the final three rounds at Corteva Coliseum in Indianapolis. The bottom two teams by seeding play in the second round, while the remaining three teams are reseeded into the semifinals, with the winners advancing to the finals.

Teams are seeded by conference record, with ties broken by record between the tied teams followed by record against the regular-season champion, if necessary.

Play-In Round; March 2 Campus Site; ESPN+
10 | Cleveland State | 101
11 | IU Indy | 93

First Round; March 3–4; Campus Sites; ESPN+
1 | Wright State | 90
10 | Cleveland State | 61
2 | Robert Morris | 68
9 | Youngstown State | 53
3 | Detroit Mercy | 84
8 | Milwaukee | 63
4 | Oakland | 84
7 | Northern Kentucky | 85
5 | Green Bay | 64
6 | Purdue Fort Wayne | 56

Second Round; March 8 Indianapolis, IN; ESPN+
5 | Green Bay | 76
7 | Northern Kentucky | 96

Semifinals; March 9 Indianapolis, IN; ESPNU/ESPN2
1 | Wright State | 103
7 | Northern Kentucky | 90
2 | Robert Morris | 64
3 | Detroit Mercy | 70

Final; March 10; Indianapolis, IN; ESPN
1 | Wright State | 66
3 | Detroit Mercy | 63

=== NCAA Tournament ===
As the conference champion, Wright State received an automatic bid to the 2026 NCAA Division I men's basketball tournament.

| Seed | Region | School | First Four | First round | Second round | Sweet Sixteen | Elite Eight | Final Four | Championship |
|---|---|---|---|---|---|---|---|---|---|
| 14 | Midwest | Wright State | Bye | L 73–82 vs. (3) Virginia | DNP | | | | |

== Conference awards ==
2026 Horizon League individual awards
| Award | Recipient(s) |
|---|---|
| Player of the Year | DeSean Goode, Robert Morris |
| Coach of the Year | Clint Sargent, Wright State |
| Defensive Player of the Year | TJ Burch, Wright State |
| Sixth Man of the Year | Chevalier Emery, Cleveland State |
| Freshman of the Year | Kellen Pickett, Wright State |
| Newcomer of the Year | TJ Burch, Wright State |
| Sportsmanship Award | Tre Beard, Cleveland State |
| Sportsmanship Award | Aaron Franklin, Milwaukee |

2026 Horizon League all-conference teams
| First Team | Second Team | Third Team | Defensive Team | Freshman Team |
|---|---|---|---|---|
| Orlando Lovejoy, DET; Brody Robinson, OAK; Corey Hadnot II, PFW; DeSean Goode, RMU; TJ Burch, WSU | Preston Ruedinger, GB; Donovan Oday, NKU; Ryan Prather Jr., RMU; Michael Imariagbe, WSU; Cris Carroll, YSU | Dayan Nessah, CSU; TJ Nadeau, DET; CJ O'Hara, GB; Kyler D'Augustino, IUI; Tuburu Naivalurua, OAK | Orlando Lovejoy, DET; Tae Dozier, NKU; Nikolaos Chitikoudis, RMU; TJ Burch, WSU; Imanuel Zorgvol, YSU | Tyler Spratt, DET; Stevie Elam, MKE; Darius Livingston, RMU; Michael Cooper, WSU; Kellen Pickett, WSU |

2026 Horizon League All-Tournament Team
**TJ Burch, WSU**
Michael Cooper, WSU
Legend Geeter, DMU
Orlando Lovejoy, DMU
LJ Wells, NKU
**Bold** denotes MVP

== Attendance ==
=== Average home attendances ===
Note: Figures include conference tournament

| # | Team | GP | Cumulative | High | Low | Avg. |
|---|---|---|---|---|---|---|
| 1 | Wright State | 16 | 56,985 | 4,892 | 2,827 | 3,562 |
| 2 | Oakland | 13 | 29,567 | 3,721 | 1,582 | 2,274 |
| 3 | Northern Kentucky | 17 | 35,680 | 3,604 | 1,502 | 2,099 |
| 4 | Green Bay | 14 | 28,772 | 2,744 | 1,510 | 2,055 |
| 5 | Milwaukee | 14 | 28,518 | 4,262 | 1,379 | 2,037 |
| 6 | Youngstown State | 15 | 30,522 | 4,637 | 1,356 | 2,035 |
| 7 | Cleveland State | 16 | 27,409 | 2,458 | 949 | 1,713 |
| 8 | Purdue Fort Wayne | 15 | 24,442 | 2,770 | 937 | 1,629 |
| 9 | Detroit Mercy | 14 | 20,678 | 3,131 | 787 | 1,477 |
| 10 | Robert Morris | 17 | 24,447 | 3,537 | 922 | 1,438 |
| 11 | IU Indy | 14 | 14,827 | 5,568 | 525 | 1,059 |
| Total | | 165 | 321,847 | 5,568 | 525 | 1,951 |
