= 2025–26 Cleveland State Vikings men's basketball team =

American college basketball season

2025–26 Cleveland State Vikings men's basketball
- Conference: Horizon League
- Record: 11–22 (6–14 Horizon)
- Head coach: Rob Summers (1st season)
- Associate head coach: Frank Young
- Assistant coaches: Michael Hunter; Louis Rowe; Casey Perrin; Dalon King
- Home arena: Wolstein Center

2025–26 Horizon League men's basketball standings
	Conf.				Overall
Team	W		L	PCT	W		L	PCT
Wright State †	15	–	5	.750	23	–	12	.657
Robert Morris	13	–	7	.650	22	–	11	.667
Detroit Mercy	12	–	8	.600	17	–	15	.531
Oakland	12	–	8	.600	16	–	16	.500
Green Bay	12	–	8	.600	18	–	15	.545
Purdue Fort Wayne	11	–	9	.550	17	–	15	.531
Northern Kentucky	10	–	10	.500	20	–	14	.588
Milwaukee	8	–	12	.400	12	–	20	.375
Youngstown State	8	–	12	.400	15	–	17	.469
Cleveland State	6	–	14	.300	11	–	22	.333
IU Indy	3	–	17	.150	7	–	25	.219
† 2026 Horizon League tournament winner

The 2025–26 Cleveland State Vikings men's basketball team represented Cleveland State University during the 2025–26 NCAA Division I men's basketball season. The Vikings, led by first-year head coach Rob Summers, played their home games at the Wolstein Center in Cleveland, Ohio as members of the Horizon League.

== Previous season ==
The Vikings finished the 2024–25 season 23–13, 14–6 in Horizon League play, to finish in a tie for second place. They defeated Northern Kentucky, before falling to eventual tournament runner-up Youngstown State in the semifinals of the Horizon League tournament. They received an invitation to the CBI, where they would defeat Queens and Florida Gulf Coast, before falling to Illinois State in the championship game.

On March 30, 2025, it was announced that head coach Daniyal Robinson would be leaving the program, in order to take the head coaching position at North Texas. On April 9, the school announced that they would be hiring Missouri assistant coach Rob Summers as the team's next head coach.

== Preseason ==
On October 8, 2025, the Horizon League released their preseason poll. Cleveland State was picked to finish eighth in the conference, while receiving two first-place votes. No players were named to the preseason All-Horizon League First or Second Teams.

=== Preseason rankings ===
Horizon League Preseason Coaches Poll
Rank	Team	Points
1	Milwaukee	428 (24)
2	Oakland	384 (7)
3	Youngstown State	364 (2)
4	Robert Morris	345 (8)
5	Purdue Fort Wayne	287 (1)
6	Northern Kentucky	274
7	Wright State	221
8	Cleveland State	217 (2)
9	Detroit Mercy	176
10	IU Indy	115
11	Green Bay	93
(#) first-place votes

== Roster ==
2025–26 Cleveland State Vikings men's basketball team
Players
Coaches

Pos.	#	Name	Height	Weight	Year	Previous school	Hometown
G	0	Foster Wonders	6 ft 5 in (1.96 m)	204 lb (93 kg)	Sr	Green Bay	Iron Mountain, Michigan
G	1	Chevalier Emery	6 ft 0 in (1.83 m)	183 lb (83 kg)	Jr	Western Carolina	Appleton, Wisconsin
G	2	Jaidon Lipscomb	6 ft 5 in (1.96 m)	171 lb (78 kg)	Sr	FIU	Columbus, Ohio
G	3	Tre Beard	5 ft 10 in (1.78 m)	165 lb (75 kg)	Sr	Shawnee State	Chillicothe, Ohio
F	4	Preist Ryan	6 ft 6 in (1.98 m)	220 lb (100 kg)	Jr	Howard College	Pittsburgh, Pennsylvania
G	5	David Giddens	6 ft 7 in (2.01 m)	205 lb (93 kg)	Jr	Coastal Alabama Community College	Atlanta, Georgia
F	7	Dayan Nessah	6 ft 7 in (2.01 m)	218 lb (99 kg)	So	George Washington	Geneva, Switzerland
G	11	Waqo Tessema	6 ft 0 in (1.83 m)	175 lb (79 kg)	Jr	Panola College	Winnipeg, Manitoba
F	12	Holden Pierre-Louis	6 ft 8 in (2.03 m)	235 lb (107 kg)	So	Temple	Potomac, Maryland
F	13	Lucas Burton	6 ft 8 in (2.03 m)	195 lb (88 kg)	Sr	Maryville	Vancouver, British Columbia
F	15	Ivan Spirov	6 ft 8 in (2.03 m)	216 lb (98 kg)	Jr	Cherno More Ticha Varna	Varna, Bulgaria
F	22	Josiah Harris	6 ft 7 in (2.01 m)	225 lb (102 kg)	Jr	Akron	Canton, Ohio
G	23	Manny Hill	6 ft 0 in (1.83 m)	175 lb (79 kg)	Sr	Heidelberg	Cleveland, Ohio
G	24	Kamari Jones	6 ft 4 in (1.93 m)	180 lb (82 kg)	RS So	Western Carolina	Indianapolis, Indiana
F	50	Kevo St. Hilaire	6 ft 10 in (2.08 m)	250 lb (113 kg)	Fr	West Lafayette High School	West Lafayette, Indiana

Head coach

- Rob Summers (West Virginia)

Assistant coach(es)

- Frank Young (West Virginia)
- Michael Hunter (Ohio Northern)
- Louis Rowe (James Madison)
- Casey Perrin (Campbell)
- Dalon King (Cleveland State)

Legend

- (C) Team captain
- (S) Suspended
- (I) Ineligible
- (W) Walk-on
- Injured
- Current redshirt

Roster
Last update: November 20, 2025

== Schedule and results ==
Date time, TV	Rank^{#}	Opponent^{#}	Result	Record	High points	High rebounds	High assists	Site (attendance) city, state
Regular season
November 3, 2025*; 8:00 pm, ESPN+/Marquee		at Loyola Chicago	L 88–91	0–1	25 – Nessah	11 – Nessah	5 – Tied	Joseph J. Gentile Arena (2,581); Chicago, IL
November 6, 2025*; 7:00 pm, ESPN+		Capital	W 71–70	1–1	13 – Beard	14 – Harris	4 – Nessah	Wolstein Center (1,450); Cleveland, OH
November 10, 2025*; 8:30 pm, BTN		at Northwestern	L 63–110	1–2	15 – Nessah	9 – Harris	3 – Tied	Welsh–Ryan Arena (4,426); Evanston, IL
November 15, 2025*; 1:00 pm, PTB Live		vs. Kent State; Greenbrier Tip-Off River Division	L 95−102	1−3	27 – Beard	9 – Nessah	4 – Tied	Colonial Hall (476); White Sulphur Springs, WV
November 16, 2025*; 2:30 pm, PTB Live		vs. Radford; Greenbrier Tip-Off River Division	W 87−82	2−3	20 – Nessah	15 – Harris	6 – Beard	Colonial Hall (459); White Sulphur Springs, WV
November 19, 2025*; 7:00 pm, ESPN+		Valparaiso	L 75–90	2–4	22 – Beard	8 – Harris	7 – Harris	Wolstein Center (2,017); Cleveland, OH
November 22, 2025*; 2:00 pm, ESPN+		at Kent State	L 71–91	2–5	15 – Lipscomb	5 – Lipscomb	2 – Tied	MAC Center (2,026); Kent, OH
November 25, 2025*; 7:00 pm, ESPN+		Waynesburg	W 109–56	3–5	21 – Ryan	8 – Tied	6 – Lipscomb	Woodling Gym (949); Cleveland, OH
November 28, 2025*; 2:00 pm, SECN+		at Missouri	L 59–86	3–6	14 – Nessah	9 – Nessah	3 – Lipscomb	Mizzou Arena (9,463); Columbia, MO
December 3, 2025; 7:00 pm, ESPN+		at Northern Kentucky	L 80–95	3–7 (0–1)	23 – Lipscomb	5 – Tied	5 – Beard	Truist Arena (1,814); Highland Heights, KY
December 6, 2025; 2:00 pm, ESPN+		Detroit Mercy	L 59–71	3–8 (0–2)	15 – Lipscomb	13 – Ryan	3 – Lipscomb	Wolstein Center (1,655); Cleveland, OH
December 14, 2025*; 2:00 pm, ESPN+		Oakland City	W 96–52	4–8	16 – Tied	8 – Nessah	6 – Lipscomb	Wolstein Center (1,003); Cleveland, OH
December 17, 2025*; 7:30 pm, ESPN+		at UAB	L 77–101	4–9	25 – Emery	6 – Lipscomb	5 – Tied	Bartow Arena (3,112); Birmingham, AL
December 21, 2025; 5:00 pm, ESPN+		Milwaukee	L 71–81	4–10 (0–3)	22 – Emery	6 – Tied	3 – Beard	Wolstein Center (1,214); Cleveland, OH
December 29, 2025; 7:00 pm, ESPN+		IU Indy	W 99–86	5–10 (1–3)	29 – Emery	10 – Harris	4 – Lipscomb	Wolstein Center (2,036); Cleveland, OH
January 4, 2026; 2:00 pm, ESPN+		at Purdue Fort Wayne	L 71–74	5–11 (1–4)	15 – Emery	9 – Tied	5 – Beard	Memorial Coliseum (1,528); Fort Wayne, IN
January 9, 2026; 7:00 pm, ESPN+		at Oakland	L 74–97	5–12 (1–5)	16 – Nessah	6 – Tied	4 – Ryan	OU Credit Union O'rena (1,937); Auburn Hills, MI
January 11, 2026; 1:00 pm, ESPN+		at Detroit Mercy	L 84–94	5–13 (1–6)	30 – Lipscomb	10 – Nessah	6 – Emery	Calihan Hall (1,113); Detroit, MI
January 15, 2026; 7:00 pm, ESPN+		Green Bay	L 73–88	5–14 (1–7)	18 – Beard	4 – Beard	4 – Nessah	Wolstein Center (2,012); Cleveland, OH
January 17, 2026; 2:00 pm, ESPN+		Youngstown State	W 80–78	6–14 (2–7)	26 – Nessah	8 – Nessah	5 – Pierre-Louis	Wolstein Center (1,964); Cleveland, OH
January 21, 2026; 7:00 pm, ESPN+		at Wright State	W 85–79	7–14 (3–7)	31 – Nessah	10 – Nessah	5 – Nessah	Nutter Center (3,630); Fairborn, OH
January 30, 2026; 7:00 pm, ESPN+		at Green Bay	W 89–82	8–14 (4–7)	18 – Nessah	9 – Nessah	5 – Emery	Resch Center (2,429); Ashwaubenon, WI
February 1, 2026; 3:00 pm, ESPN+		at Milwaukee	W 90–88	9–14 (5–7)	21 – Lipscomb	13 – Nessah	6 – Nessah	UW–Milwaukee Panther Arena (2,017); Milwaukee, WI
February 4, 2026; 7:00 pm, ESPN+		Oakland	W 91–78	10–14 (6–7)	24 – Beard	10 – Nessah	9 – Beard	Wolstein Center (1,467); Cleveland, OH
February 7, 2026; 2:00 pm, ESPN+		at IU Indy	L 74–82	10–15 (6–8)	24 – Nessah	9 – Harris	7 – Lipscomb	The Jungle (1,017); Indianapolis, IN
February 12, 2026; 7:00 pm, ESPN+		Robert Morris	L 68–85	10−16 (6−9)	21 – Lipscomb	5 – Harris	3 – Tied	Wolstein Center (2,104); Cleveland, OH
February 15, 2026; 2:00 pm, ESPN+		Wright State	L 90–102	10−17 (6−10)	30 – Emery	6 – Harris	5 – Nessah	Wolstein Center (2,097); Cleveland, OH
February 18, 2026; 6:30 pm, ESPN+		at Youngstown State	L 82−106	10−18 (6−11)	32 – Lipscomb	8 – Harris	5 – Emery	Beeghly Center (1,790); Youngstown, OH
February 22, 2026; 2:00 pm, ESPN+		Purdue Fort Wayne	L 86−92	10−19 (6−12)	21 – Emery	8 – Harris	6 – Beard	Wolstein Center (2,186); Cleveland, OH
February 25, 2026; 7:00 pm, ESPN+		Northern Kentucky	L 70–81	10–20 (6–13)	20 – Ryan	10 – Ryan	5 – Harris	Wolstein Center (2,458); Cleveland, OH
February 28, 2026; 1:00 pm, ESPN+		at Robert Morris	L 64–83	10–21 (6–14)	11 – Emery	5 – Harris	5 – Beard	UPMC Events Center (1,779); Moon Township, PA
Horizon League tournament
March 2, 2026; 7:00 pm, ESPN+	(10)	(11) IU Indy; Play-In Round	W 101–93	11–21	23 – Tied	12 – Ryan	8 – Lipscomb	Wolstein Center (1,684); Cleveland, OH
March 4, 2026; 7:00 pm, ESPN+	(10)	at (1) Wright State; First round	L 61–90	11–22	15 – Ryan	7 – Ryan	1 – Tied	Nutter Center (3,713); Fairborn, OH
*Non-conference game. ^{#}Rankings from AP Poll. (#) Tournament seedings in parentheses. All times are in Eastern.
