= Ben Howlett =

Ben Howlett may refer to:

- Ben Howlett (footballer), Australian rules footballer
- Ben Howlett (politician), British politician
- Ben Howlett (basketball), American college basketball coach
