= 2025–26 IU Indy Jaguars men's basketball team =

American college basketball season

2025–26 IU Indy Jaguars men's basketball
- Conference: Horizon League
- Record: 7–25 (3–18 Horizon)
- Head coach: Ben Howlett (1st season)
- Assistant coaches: John Peckinpaugh; Dan Monteroso; Connor Harr; Devin Heath-Granger
- Home arena: The Jungle; Corteva Coliseum

2025–26 Horizon League men's basketball standings
	Conf.				Overall
Team	W		L	PCT	W		L	PCT
Wright State †	15	–	5	.750	23	–	12	.657
Robert Morris	13	–	7	.650	22	–	11	.667
Detroit Mercy	12	–	8	.600	17	–	15	.531
Oakland	12	–	8	.600	16	–	16	.500
Green Bay	12	–	8	.600	18	–	15	.545
Purdue Fort Wayne	11	–	9	.550	17	–	15	.531
Northern Kentucky	10	–	10	.500	20	–	14	.588
Milwaukee	8	–	12	.400	12	–	20	.375
Youngstown State	8	–	12	.400	15	–	17	.469
Cleveland State	6	–	14	.300	11	–	22	.333
IU Indy	3	–	17	.150	7	–	25	.219
† 2026 Horizon League tournament winner

The 2025–26 IU Indy Jaguars men's basketball team represented Indiana University Indianapolis during the 2025–26 NCAA Division I men's basketball season. The Jaguars, led by first-year head coach Ben Howlett, played their home games at The Jungle, with one game at Corteva Coliseum, in Indianapolis, Indiana as members of the Horizon League.

This is planned to be the Jaguars' final season at The Jungle. IU Indy plans to open the new James T. Morris Arena in time for the 2026–27 season.

== Previous season ==
The Jaguars finished the 2024–25 season 10–22, 6–14 in Horizon League play, to finish in ninth place. They were defeated by Wright State in the first round of the Horizon League tournament.

On May 13, 2025, head coach Paul Corsaro was fired after just one season, due to his reported treatment of his players. On May 23, the school announced that they would be hiring West Liberty head coach Ben Howlett as Corsaro's successor.

== Preseason ==
On October 8, 2025, the Horizon League released its preseason poll. IU Indy was picked to finish tenth in the conference. No players were named to the preseason All-Horizon League First or Second Teams.

=== Preseason rankings ===
Horizon League Preseason Coaches Poll
Rank	Team	Points
1	Milwaukee	428 (24)
2	Oakland	384 (7)
3	Youngstown State	364 (2)
4	Robert Morris	345 (8)
5	Purdue Fort Wayne	287 (1)
6	Northern Kentucky	274
7	Wright State	221
8	Cleveland State	217 (2)
9	Detroit Mercy	176
10	IU Indy	115
11	Green Bay	93
(#) first-place votes

== Roster ==
2025–26 IU Indy Jaguars men's basketball team
Players
Coaches

Pos.	#	Name	Height	Weight	Year	Previous school	Hometown
G	0	Jaxon Edwards	6 ft 5 in (1.96 m)	195 lb (88 kg)	Sr	St. Bonaventure	Indianapolis, Indiana
F	1	Reece Hagy	6 ft 8 in (2.03 m)	220 lb (100 kg)	Fr	Air Force Prep	Charlottesville, Virginia
G	2	Corey Boston	5 ft 10 in (1.78 m)	170 lb (77 kg)	GS	Concord	LaFayette, Alabama
G	4	Micah Davis	6 ft 2 in (1.88 m)	175 lb (79 kg)	So	Eastern Kentucky	Greenwood, Indiana
G	5	JP Dragas	6 ft 1 in (1.85 m)	160 lb (73 kg)	So	West Liberty	Madison, Ohio
F	7	Finley Woodward	6 ft 7 in (2.01 m)	215 lb (98 kg)	Sr	West Liberty	Bristol, England
F	10	Lav Cvetkovic	6 ft 7 in (2.01 m)	210 lb (95 kg)	GS	UVA Wise	Novi Sad, Serbia
G	11	Garrett Sever	6 ft 3 in (1.91 m)	190 lb (86 kg)	Fr	Hilliard Bradley High School	Hilliard, Ohio
G	12	Kyler D'Augustino	6 ft 1 in (1.85 m)	195 lb (88 kg)	Jr	West Liberty	Albany, Ohio
G	13	Maguire Mitchell	6 ft 5 in (1.96 m)	185 lb (84 kg)	Fr	Zionsville High School	Zionsville, Indiana
G	15	Matt Compas (5th)	6 ft 4 in (1.93 m)	170 lb (77 kg)	Sr	Dalton State	Blue Bell, Pennsylvania
F	20	Kameron Tinsley	6 ft 6 in (1.98 m)	180 lb (82 kg)	So	West Liberty	Roanoke, Virginia
G	22	Ajay Holubar	6 ft 3 in (1.91 m)	185 lb (84 kg)	Sr	UIndy	Bargersville, Indiana
F	23	Aiden Miller	6 ft 8 in (2.03 m)	210 lb (95 kg)	So	Point Park	Austin, Texas
F	24	Gabe Stewart	6 ft 9 in (2.06 m)	225 lb (102 kg)	Fr	DME Academy	Daytona Beach, Florida

Head coach

- Ben Howlett (West Liberty)

Assistant coach(es)

- John Peckinpaugh (Purdue Fort Wayne)
- Dan Monteroso (West Liberty)
- Connor Harr (West Liberty)
- Devin Heath-Granger (Goshen)

Legend

- (C) Team captain
- (S) Suspended
- (I) Ineligible
- (W) Walk-on
- (5th) Fifth-year senior
- Injured
- Current redshirt

Roster
Last update: November 21, 2025

== Schedule and results ==
Date time, TV	Rank^{#}	Opponent^{#}	Result	Record	High points	High rebounds	High assists	Site (attendance) city, state
Regular season
November 3, 2025*; 6:30 pm, B1G+		at Ohio State	L 102–118	0–1	22 – Tinsley	6 – Woodward	8 – Woodward	Value City Arena (8,141); Columbus, OH
November 6, 2025*; 6:30 pm, ESPN+		LIU	L 90–94	0–2	22 – Mitchell	6 – Tied	6 – Tied	The Jungle (768); Indianapolis, IN
November 8, 2025*; 5:00 pm, ESPN+		at Butler	L 80–112	0–3	25 – Compas	6 – Hagy	6 – Woodward	Hinkle Fieldhouse (7,132); Indianapolis, IN
November 11, 2025*; 11:00 am, ESPN+/WNDY		IU Columbus	W 121–77	1–3	19 – Compas	8 – Woodward	5 – Tied	Corteva Coliseum (5,568); Indianapolis, IN
November 14, 2025*; 6:30 pm, ESPN+		at Eastern Michigan	W 90–83	2–3	19 – Mitchell	7 – Woodward	4 – Tied	Convocation Center (1,655); Ypsilanti, MI
November 18, 2025*; 7:00 pm, ESPN+		at Charleston Southern	L 91–103	2–4	28 – D'Augustino	8 – Miller	4 – Davis	Buccaneer Field House (875); North Charleston, SC
November 21, 2025*; 2:00 pm, MWN		vs. Alabama State; Air Force Classic	L 80–101	2–5	20 – Dragas	7 – Woodward	7 – Woodward	Clune Arena; Air Force Academy, CO
November 23, 2025*; 5:00 pm, MWN		at Air Force; Air Force Classic	L 85–98	2–6	20 – D'Augustino	8 – Miller	4 – D'Augustino	Clune Arena (1,099); Air Force Academy, CO
November 29, 2025*; 2:00 pm, ESPN+		Morehead State	W 85–80	3–6	25 – D'Augustino	7 – Woodward	9 – Woodward	The Jungle (564); Indianapolis, IN
December 3, 2025; 7:00 pm, ESPN+		at Detroit Mercy	L 78–92	3–7 (0–1)	14 – Tied	7 – Woodward	7 – Woodward	Calihan Hall (787); Detroit, MI
December 6, 2025; 2:00 pm, ESPN+		Youngstown State	L 55–78	3–8 (0–2)	19 – D'Augustino	5 – Tied	3 – Tied	The Jungle (629); Indianapolis, IN
December 11, 2025; 6:30 pm, ESPN+/WNDY		Green Bay	L 75–85	3–9 (0–3)	17 – Tied	7 – Edwards	5 – Davis	The Jungle (676); Indianapolis, IN
December 16, 2025*; 6:30 pm, ESPN+		Miami Middletown	W 126–73	4–9	19 – Edwards	10 – Hagy	6 – Tied	The Jungle (529); Indianapolis, IN
December 22, 2025*; 9:00 pm, MWN		at Grand Canyon	L 78–91	4–10	24 – D'Augustino	9 – Woodward	7 – Woodward	Global Credit Union Arena (7,291); Phoenix, AZ
December 29, 2025; 7:00 pm, ESPN+		at Cleveland State	L 86–99	4–11 (0–4)	27 – D'Augustino	7 – Edwards	7 – Edwards	Wolstein Center (2,036); Cleveland, OH
January 1, 2026; 2:00 pm, ESPN+		at Northern Kentucky	L 72–81	4–12 (0–5)	20 – D'Augustino	6 – Woodward	5 – Woodward	Truist Arena (1,645); Highland Heights, KY
January 4, 2026; 2:00 pm, ESPN+		Wright State	L 77–81	4–13 (0–6)	31 – D'Augustino	4 – Tied	10 – Woodward	The Jungle (525); Indianapolis, IN
January 9, 2026; 7:00 pm, ESPN+		at Green Bay	L 59–75	4–14 (0–7)	18 – Edwards	7 – Woodward	5 – D'Augustino	Kress Events Center (1,531); Green Bay, WI
January 11, 2026; 2:00 pm, ESPN+		at Milwaukee	L 83–95	4–15 (0–8)	24 – D'Augustino	6 – Mitchell	8 – Woodward	UWM Panther Arena (1,402); Milwaukee, WI
January 15, 2026; 6:30 pm, ESPN+		Robert Morris	W 96–93 ^{OT}	5–15 (1–8)	28 – D'Augustino	11 – Edwards	6 – D'Augustino	The Jungle (732); Indianapolis, IN
January 17, 2026; 2:00 pm, ESPN+		Detroit Mercy	L 77–80	5–16 (1–9)	20 – D'Augustino	7 – Edwards	6 – Woodward	The Jungle (742); Indianapolis, IN
January 21, 2026; 7:00 pm, ESPN+		at Oakland	W 103–85	6–16 (2–9)	22 – Woodward	9 – Edwards	9 – Woodward	OU Credit Union O'rena (2,233); Auburn Hills, MI
January 25, 2026; 2:00 pm, ESPN+/WNDY		Purdue Fort Wayne	Postponed until February 28 due to inclement weather					The Jungle; Indianapolis, IN
January 28, 2026; 7:00 pm, ESPN+		at Robert Morris	L 58–74	6–17 (2–10)	18 – Davis	6 – Tied	5 – Woodward	UPMC Events Center (1,023); Moon Township, PA
January 30, 2026; 6:30 pm, ESPN+		at Youngstown State	L 76–85	6–18 (2–11)	15 – Edwards	11 – Edwards	10 – Woodward	Beeghly Center (1,644); Youngstown, OH
February 7, 2026; 2:00 pm, ESPN+		Cleveland State	W 82–74	7–18 (3–11)	16 – D'Augustino	11 – Edwards	8 – Woodward	The Jungle (1,017); Indianapolis, IN
February 10, 2026; 6:30 pm, ESPN+		Milwaukee	L 88–92	7–19 (3–12)	23 – Mitchell	8 – Mitchell	14 – Woodward	The Jungle (631); Indianapolis, IN
February 12, 2026; 6:30 pm, ESPN+		Northern Kentucky	L 81−84	7−20 (3−13)	22 – D'Augustino	9 – Miller	5 – Edwards	The Jungle (712); Indianapolis, IN
February 15, 2026; 2:00 pm, ESPN+		at Purdue Fort Wayne	L 78−83	7−21 (3−14)	23 – Davis	14 – Edwards	5 – Woodward	Memorial Coliseum (2,770); Fort Wayne, IN
February 19, 2026; 7:00 pm, ESPN+		at Wright State	L 73−85	7−22 (3−15)	20 – D'Augustino	4 – Woodward	5 – Woodward	Nutter Center (2,981); Fairborn, OH
February 25, 2026; 6:30 pm, ESPN+		Oakland	L 74–86	7–23 (3–16)	25 – Mitchell	9 – Woodward	9 – Woodward	The Jungle (617); Indianapolis, IN
February 28, 2026; 2:00 pm, ESPN+/WNDY		Purdue Fort Wayne	L 81–87	7–24 (3–17)	20 – Mitchell	7 – Woodward	10 – Woodward	The Jungle (1,117); Indianapolis, IN
Horizon League tournament
March 2, 2026; 7:00 pm, ESPN+	(11)	at (10) Cleveland State; Play-In Round	L 93–101	7–25	23 – Tied	10 – Edwards	10 – Woodward	Wolstein Center (1,684); Cleveland, OH
*Non-conference game. ^{#}Rankings from AP Poll. (#) Tournament seedings in parentheses. All times are in Eastern.
