= Louis Rowe (basketball) =

American basketball coach

Current position
- Title: Assistant Coach
- Team: Cleveland State
- Conference: Horizon

Biographical details
- Born: December 26, 1972 (age 53)

Playing career
- 1990–1992: Florida
- 1993–1995: James Madison

Coaching career (HC unless noted)
- 2007–2010: James Madison (grad. assistant)
- 2010–2012: James Madison (assistant)
- 2012–2015: FIU (assistant)
- 2015–2016: Bowling Green (assistant)
- 2016–2020: James Madison
- 2021–2023: South Florida (assistant)
- 2023–2025: Oregon (assistant)
- 2025–present: Cleveland State (assistant)

Head coaching record
- Overall: 43–85 (.336)

Accomplishments and honors

Awards
- First-team All-CAA (1995)

Louis Benton Rowe (born December 26, 1972) is an American basketball coach who most recently was the head coach of his alma mater, James Madison University, being introduced as the head coach on March 31, 2016. Rowe had been an assistant at James Madison, FIU, and Bowling Green. He played at James Madison from 1993 to 1995 after transferring from Florida. He ranks fifth on James Madison's career scoring average list. After college, he played professionally in Europe (New Wave Basketball Sweden,Go Pass Pepinster, Antwerp Giants, Melco Ieper, Spirou Charleroi and Roanne) before turning his attention to coaching.

Rowe and James Madison University agreed to part ways on March 9, 2020. He compiled a 43–85 record in four seasons. Rowe subsequently spent two seasons each as an assistant at South Florida and Oregon before joining Rob Summers' staff as an assistant at Cleveland State.

== Head coaching record ==
Record table
Season	Team	Overall	Conference	Standing	Postseason
James Madison Dukes (Colonial Athletic Association) (2016–2020)
2016–17	James Madison	10–23	7–11	T–7th	
2017–18	James Madison	10–22	6–12	T–7th	
2018–19	James Madison	14–19	6–12	T–8th	
2019–20	James Madison	9–21	2–16	10th	
James Madison:		43–85 (.336)	21–51 (.292)		
Total:		43–85 (.336)			
