= 2025–26 Robert Morris Colonials men's basketball team =

American college basketball season

2025–26 Robert Morris Colonials men's basketball
- Conference: Horizon League
- Record: 22–11 (13–7 Horizon)
- Head coach: Andrew Toole (16th season)
- Assistant coaches: Kim Lewis; Anthony Richards; Matthew Sweet; Keith Oddo
- Home arena: UPMC Events Center

2025–26 Horizon League men's basketball standings
	Conf.				Overall
Team	W		L	PCT	W		L	PCT
Wright State †	15	–	5	.750	23	–	12	.657
Robert Morris	13	–	7	.650	22	–	11	.667
Detroit Mercy	12	–	8	.600	17	–	15	.531
Oakland	12	–	8	.600	16	–	16	.500
Green Bay	12	–	8	.600	18	–	15	.545
Purdue Fort Wayne	11	–	9	.550	17	–	15	.531
Northern Kentucky	10	–	10	.500	20	–	14	.588
Milwaukee	8	–	12	.400	12	–	20	.375
Youngstown State	8	–	12	.400	15	–	17	.469
Cleveland State	6	–	14	.300	11	–	22	.333
IU Indy	3	–	17	.150	7	–	25	.219
† 2026 Horizon League tournament winner

The 2025–26 Robert Morris Colonials men's basketball team represented Robert Morris University during the 2025–26 NCAA Division I men's basketball season. The Colonials, led by 16th-year head coach Andrew Toole, played their home games at the UPMC Events Center in Moon Township, Pennsylvania as members of the Horizon League.

== Previous season ==
The Colonials finished the 2024–25 season 26–9, 15–5 in Horizon League play, to finish Horizon League regular season champions. They defeated Wright State, Oakland, and Youngstown State to win their first ever Horizon League tournament championship, and in turn, their first NCAA tournament appearance since 2015. In the NCAA tournament, they would receive the #15 seed in the East Region, where they would be defeated by #2 region seed Alabama in the First Round.

== Preseason ==
On October 8, 2025, the Horizon League released their preseason poll. Robert Morris was picked to finish fourth in the conference, while receiving eight first-place votes. One player was named to the preseason All-Horizon League Second Team.

=== Preseason rankings ===
Horizon League Preseason Coaches Poll
Rank	Team	Points
1	Milwaukee	428 (24)
2	Oakland	384 (7)
3	Youngstown State	364 (2)
4	Robert Morris	345 (8)
5	Purdue Fort Wayne	287 (1)
6	Northern Kentucky	274
7	Wright State	221
8	Cleveland State	217 (2)
9	Detroit Mercy	176
10	IU Indy	115
11	Green Bay	93
(#) first-place votes

=== Preseason All-Horizon League Teams ===
Preseason All-Horizon League Teams
Team	Player	Position	Year
Second	DeSean Goode	Forward	Sophomore

== Roster ==
2025–26 Robert Morris Colonials men's basketball team
Players
Coaches

Pos.	#	Name	Height	Weight	Year	Previous school	Hometown
F	0	DeSean Goode	6 ft 8 in (2.03 m)	230 lb (104 kg)	So	IU Indy	Fairmont, West Virginia
F	1	Josh Hill	6 ft 11 in (2.11 m)	200 lb (91 kg)	So	Arkansas State	Laurel, Maryland
G/F	2	Ryan Prather Jr.	6 ft 5 in (1.96 m)	205 lb (93 kg)	RS Jr	Akron	Clarksburg, Maryland
G	3	Ta'Zir Smith	6 ft 3 in (1.91 m)	182 lb (83 kg)	RS So	Louisiana–Monroe	Woodbridge, Virginia
G	4	Kaleb Brown	6 ft 7 in (2.01 m)	245 lb (111 kg)	Sr	Cal State Fullerton	Huntsville, Alabama
G	5	Cam Wilds	6 ft 6 in (1.98 m)	215 lb (98 kg)	Jr	Clarion	Virginia Beach, Virginia
F	6	Eddie Cooke III	6 ft 5 in (1.96 m)	202 lb (92 kg)	Fr	Legacy Early College High School	Atlanta, Georgia
G/F	9	Cyril Arvanitis	6 ft 3 in (1.91 m)	185 lb (84 kg)	Sr	Red Bank Catholic High School	Elberon, New Jersey
G	12	Darius Livingston	6 ft 2 in (1.88 m)	165 lb (75 kg)	Fr	Discovery Academy	Orlando, Florida
F	13	Samuel Obenjo	6 ft 10 in (2.08 m)	187 lb (85 kg)	Fr	Layton Christian Academy	Stockholm, Sweden
G	14	Vasilije Serafimoski	6 ft 6 in (1.98 m)	195 lb (88 kg)	RS Jr	La Roche	Gostivar, North Macedonia
F	16	Nikolaos Chitikoudis	6 ft 9 in (2.06 m)	215 lb (98 kg)	Jr	North Carolina A&T	East Thessaloniki, Greece
G	20	Albert Vargas	5 ft 10 in (1.78 m)	160 lb (73 kg)	Sr	Southern Connecticut	New York, New York
G	21	Jeremiah Littlejohn	6 ft 5 in (1.96 m)	160 lb (73 kg)	Jr	Western Oklahoma State	Gaithersburg, Maryland
C	35	Ubong Okon	7 ft 1 in (2.16 m)	230 lb (104 kg)	Sr	Alabama State	Akwa Ibom, Nigeria

Head coach

- Andrew Toole (Penn)

Assistant coach(es)

- Kim Lewis (Tulane)
- Anthony Richards (Le Moyne)
- Matthew Sweet (Dayton)
- Keith Oddo (Louisville)

Legend

- (C) Team captain
- (S) Suspended
- (I) Ineligible
- (W) Walk-on
- Injured
- Current redshirt

Roster
Last update: November 18, 2025

== Schedule and results ==
Date time, TV	Rank^{#}	Opponent^{#}	Result	Record	High points	High rebounds	High assists	Site (attendance) city, state
Regular season
November 4, 2025*; 8:30 pm, BTN		at Iowa	L 69–101	0–1	14 – Chitikoudis	9 – Chitikoudis	4 – Vargas	Carver–Hawkeye Arena (9,293); Iowa City, IA
November 6, 2025*; 7:30 pm, ESPN+		at Drake	W 81–79 ^{OT}	1–1	18 – Chitikoudis	10 – Tied	7 – Prather Jr.	Knapp Center (3,142); Des Moines, IA
November 10, 2025*; 7:00 pm, ESPN+		Geneva	W 93–47	2–1	16 – Hill	9 – Goode	6 – Vargas	UPMC Events Center (1,589); Moon Township, PA
November 13, 2025*; 7:00 pm, ESPN+		Pitt Greensburg	W 81–57	3–1	19 – Chitikoudis	12 – Goode	5 – Livingston	UPMC Events Center (1,057); Moon Township, PA
November 20, 2025*; 6:00 pm, ESPN+		at St. Bonaventure	L 61–75	3–2	19 – Hill	10 – Hill	7 – Livingston	Reilly Center (3,353); St. Bonaventure, NY
November 23, 2025*; 3:00 pm, FloCollege		at Monmouth	L 70–71 ^{OT}	3–3	17 – Tied	10 – Goode	4 – Vargas	OceanFirst Bank Center (1,583); West Long Branch, NJ
November 26, 2025*; 2:00 pm, ESPN+		UIC	W 88–74	4–3	25 – Prather Jr.	7 – Goode	8 – Vargas	UPMC Events Center (922); Moon Township, PA
November 28, 2025*; 2:00 pm, ESPN+		Southern Utah; Urban-Bennett Invitational	W 61–54	5–3	14 – Vargas	14 – Goode	5 – Vargas	UPMC Events Center; Moon Township, PA
November 30, 2025*; 2:00 pm, ESPN+		Stetson; Urban-Bennett Invitational	W 80–62	6–3	17 – Prather Jr.	10 – Goode	7 – Livingston	UPMC Events Center (1,003); Moon Township, PA
December 4, 2025; 7:00 pm, ESPN+		at Green Bay	W 80–78	7–3 (1–0)	18 – Goode	9 – Goode	3 – Prather Jr.	Kress Events Center (1,535); Green Bay, WI
December 6, 2025; 8:00 pm, ESPN+		at Milwaukee	L 72–74	7–4 (1–1)	26 – Goode	10 – Hill	4 – Livingston	UW–Milwaukee Panther Arena (1,959); Milwaukee, WI
December 13, 2025*; 1:00 pm, ESPN+		Toledo	W 75–70	8–4	17 – Tied	14 – Chitikoudis	5 – Vargas	UPMC Events Center (996); Moon Township, PA
December 17, 2025; 7:00 pm, ESPN+		Youngstown State	W 80–77 ^{OT}	9–4 (2–1)	19 – Prather Jr.	12 – Tied	4 – Tied	UPMC Events Center (1,407); Moon Township, PA
December 20, 2025*; 1:00 pm, NECFR		at Saint Francis	W 79–70	10–4	24 – Goode	8 – Goode	9 – Prather Jr.	DeGol Arena (385); Loretto, PA
December 29, 2025; 7:00 pm, SNP/ESPN+		Northern Kentucky	L 77–79	10–5 (2–2)	18 – Goode	14 – Goode	6 – Vargas	UPMC Events Center (1,387); Moon Township, PA
January 2, 2026; 7:00 pm, ESPN+		at Detroit Mercy	W 85–77	11–5 (3–2)	18 – Goode	10 – Chitikoudis	5 – Brown	Calihan Hall (1,443); Detroit, MI
January 4, 2026; 3:00 pm, ESPN+		at Oakland	L 73–96	11–6 (3–3)	18 – Goode	8 – Goode	4 – Vargas	OU Credit Union O'rena (1,880); Auburn Hills, MI
January 11, 2026; 2:00 pm, ESPN+		Purdue Fort Wayne	L 74–79	11–7 (3–4)	20 – Prather Jr.	8 – Goode	9 – Vargas	UPMC Events Center (1,313); Moon Township, PA
January 15, 2026; 6:30 pm, ESPN+		at IU Indy	L 93–96 ^{OT}	11–8 (3–5)	21 – Prather Jr.	8 – Goode	6 – Vargas	The Jungle (732); Indianapolis, IN
January 17, 2026; 7:00 pm, ESPN+		at Northern Kentucky	W 92–89 ^{OT}	12–8 (4–5)	23 – Prather Jr.	11 – Chitikoudis	3 – Tied	Truist Arena (2,182); Highland Heights, KY
January 22, 2026; 7:00 pm, ESPN+		Milwaukee	W 88–76	13–8 (5–5)	23 – Prather Jr.	8 – Tied	4 – Goode	UPMC Events Center (1,355); Moon Township, PA
January 24, 2026; 1:00 pm, ESPN+		Green Bay	L 67–71	13–9 (5–6)	17 – Goode	12 – Goode	5 – Tied	UPMC Events Center (1,487); Moon Township, PA
January 28, 2026; 7:00 pm, SNP/ESPN+		IU Indy	W 74–58	14–9 (6–6)	20 – Prather Jr.	11 – Chitikoudis	4 – Tied	UPMC Events Center (1,023); Moon Township, PA
January 31, 2026; 1:00 pm, ESPN+		at Purdue Fort Wayne	L 71–83	14–10 (6–7)	17 – Goode	7 – Chitikoudis	5 – Prather Jr.	Memorial Coliseum (1,974); Fort Wayne, IN
February 4, 2026; 7:00 pm, ESPNU		Wright State	W 72–66	15–10 (7–7)	17 – Prather Jr.	12 – Chitikoudis	5 – Prather Jr.	UPMC Events Center (1,921); Moon Township, PA
February 7, 2026; 4:30 pm, ESPN+		at Youngstown State	W 72–66	16–10 (8–7)	24 – Goode	9 – Chitikoudis	6 – Prather Jr.	Beeghly Center (2,245); Youngstown, OH
February 12, 2026; 7:00 pm, ESPN+		at Cleveland State	W 85–68	17–10 (9–7)	25 – Prather Jr.	7 – Tied	6 – Prather Jr.	Wolstein Center (2,104); Cleveland, OH
February 15, 2026; 2:00 pm, SNP/ESPN+		Oakland	W 93–69	18–10 (10–7)	20 – Chitikoudis	13 – Chitikoudis	10 – Prather Jr.	UPMC Events Center (1,649); Moon Township, PA
February 22, 2026; 2:00 pm, ESPNU		at Wright State	W 81–68	19–10 (11–7)	24 – Livingston	9 – Chitikoudis	6 – Prather Jr.	Nutter Center (4,659); Fairborn, OH
February 25, 2026; 7:00 pm, SNP/ESPN+		Detroit Mercy	W 73–62	20–10 (12–7)	29 – Prather Jr.	12 – Tied	6 – Livingston	UPMC Events Center (1,568); Moon Township, PA
February 28, 2026; 1:00 pm, ESPN+		Cleveland State	W 83–64	21–10 (13–7)	18 – Chitikoudis	10 – Chitikoudis	6 – Cooke III	UPMC Events Center (1,779); Moon Township, PA
Horizon League tournament
March 4, 2026; 7:00 p.m., ESPN+	(2)	(9) Youngstown State; First round	W 68–53	22–10	24 – Prather Jr.	11 – Goode	4 – Livingston	UPMC Events Center (3,537); Moon Township, PA
March 9, 2026; 9:30 p.m., ESPN2	(2)	vs. (3) Detroit Mercy; Semifinal	L 64–70	22–11	14 – Goode	10 – Goode	7 – Chitikoudis	Corteva Coliseum; Indianapolis, IN
*Non-conference game. ^{#}Rankings from AP Poll. (#) Tournament seedings in parentheses. All times are in Eastern.
