= 2025–26 Wright State Raiders men's basketball team =

American college basketball season

2025–26 Wright State Raiders men's basketball

Horizon League regular season and tournament champions

NCAA tournament, First round
- Conference: Horizon League
- Record: 23–12 (15–5 Horizon)
- Head coach: Clint Sargent (2nd season)
- Assistant coaches: Dan Beré; Travis Trice; Jaaron Simmons
- Home arena: Nutter Center

2025–26 Horizon League men's basketball standings
	Conf.				Overall
Team	W		L	PCT	W		L	PCT
Wright State †	15	–	5	.750	23	–	12	.657
Robert Morris	13	–	7	.650	22	–	11	.667
Detroit Mercy	12	–	8	.600	17	–	15	.531
Oakland	12	–	8	.600	16	–	16	.500
Green Bay	12	–	8	.600	18	–	15	.545
Purdue Fort Wayne	11	–	9	.550	17	–	15	.531
Northern Kentucky	10	–	10	.500	20	–	14	.588
Milwaukee	8	–	12	.400	12	–	20	.375
Youngstown State	8	–	12	.400	15	–	17	.469
Cleveland State	6	–	14	.300	11	–	22	.333
IU Indy	3	–	17	.150	7	–	25	.219
† 2026 Horizon League tournament winner

The 2025–26 Wright State Raiders men's basketball team represented Wright State University in the 2025–26 NCAA Division I men's basketball season. The Raiders, led by second-year head coach Clint Sargent, played their home games at the Nutter Center near Dayton as members of the Horizon League. They were both the Horizon League regular season champions and tournament champions and participants in the 2026 NCAA Division I basketball tournament.

== Previous season ==
The Clint Sargent era began with disappointing results. A seemingly talented roster struggled to an eighth-place finish and an early tournament exit.

== Offseason ==
=== Departures ===
Wright State departures
Name	Number	Pos.	Height	Weight	Year	Hometown	Reason for departure
Drey Carter	2	G	6' 8"	210	RS Sophomore	Bellefontaine, OH	Transferred to Fairmont State (DII)
Alex Huibregtse	3	G	6' 3"	205	RS Senior	Grafton, WI	Transferred to Bradley
Keaton Norris	4	G	6' 0"	175	RS Junior	Hilliard, OH	Transferred to Samford
Brandon Noel	14	F	6' 8"	240	RS Junior	Lucasville, OH	Transferred to Ohio State
Braden Grant	15	F	6' 7"	210	RS Junior	Beavercreek, OH	Graduated
Andrew Welage	22	G	6' 6"	205	Graduate student	Greensburg, IN	Exhausted eligibility
Jack Doumbia	23	G	6' 6"	195	Senior	Lanham, MD	Transferred to Towson
Ben Southerland	24	F	6' 7"	215	RS Sophomore	Cincinnati, OH	Transferred to Tampa (DII)

=== Incoming transfers ===
Wright State incoming transfers
Name	No.	Pos.	Ht.	Wt.	Year	Hometown	Previous school
Bryan Etumnu	1	F	6' 7"	220	Senior	Sugar Land, TX	Merrimack
Sam Alamutu	2	G	6' 5"	220	Graduate student	Ajax, ON	Vermont
Dominic Pangonis	3	G	6' 7"	200	Sophomore	Toronto, ON	Stephen F. Austin
TJ Burch	22	G	6' 1"	160	Sophomore	Dallas, TX	Ball State

=== 2025 recruiting class ===
College recruiting information
Name	Hometown	School	Height	Weight	Commit date
Michael Cooper; G	Jeffersonville, IN	Jeffersonville High School	6 ft 3 in (1.91 m)	185 lb (84 kg)	Aug 6, 2024
Michael Cooper; G	Recruit ratings: No ratings found				
P.J. Douglas; F	Jeffersonville, IN	Jeffersonville High School	6 ft 4 in (1.93 m)	205 lb (93 kg)	Aug 10, 2024
P.J. Douglas; F	Recruit ratings: No ratings found				
Kellen Pickett; F	Fort Wayne, IN	Blackhawk Christian School	6 ft 8 in (2.03 m)	190 lb (86 kg)	Jul 2, 2024
Kellen Pickett; F	Recruit ratings: 247Sports: ESPN: (77)				
Overall recruit ranking: 247Sports: 188
Note: In many cases, Scout, Rivals, 247Sports, On3, and ESPN may conflict in their listings of height and weight.; In these cases, the average was taken. ESPN grades are on a 100-point scale.; Sources: "2025 Team Ranking". Rivals.; "Wright State 2025 Basketball Commits". 247Sports.

== Preseason ==
On October 8, 2025, the Horizon League released their preseason poll. Wright State was picked to finish seventh in the conference. No players were named to the preseason All-Horizon League First or Second Teams.

=== Preseason rankings ===
Horizon League Preseason Coaches Poll
Rank	Team	Points
1	Milwaukee	428 (24)
2	Oakland	384 (7)
3	Youngstown State	364 (2)
4	Robert Morris	345 (8)
5	Purdue Fort Wayne	287 (1)
6	Northern Kentucky	274
7	Wright State	221
8	Cleveland State	217 (2)
9	Detroit Mercy	176
10	IU Indy	115
11	Green Bay	93
(#) first-place votes

== Roster ==
2025–26 Wright State Raiders men's basketball team
Players
Coaches

Pos.	#	Name	Height	Weight	Year	Previous school	Hometown
F	1	Bryan Etumnu	6 ft 7 in (2.01 m)	220 lb (100 kg)	Sr	Merrimack	Sugar Land, TX
G	2	Sam Alamutu	6 ft 5 in (1.96 m)	220 lb (100 kg)	GS	Vermont	Ajax, Ontario
G	3	Dominic Pangonis	6 ft 7 in (2.01 m)	200 lb (91 kg)	So	Stephen F. Austin	Toronto, Ontario
F	4	Kellen Pickett	6 ft 9 in (2.06 m)	215 lb (98 kg)	Fr	Blackhawk Christian	Fort Wayne, IN
G	5	Alex Bruskotter	6 ft 8 in (2.03 m)	205 lb (93 kg)	RS Fr	Shelby	Shelby, Ohio
G	12	PJ Douglas	6 ft 4 in (1.93 m)	205 lb (93 kg)	Fr	Jeffersonville	Jeffersonville, IN
G	13	Solomon Callaghan	6 ft 2 in (1.88 m)	195 lb (88 kg)	RS So	Wadsworth	Wadsworth, Ohio
G	15	Isaiah Williams	6 ft 3 in (1.91 m)	185 lb (84 kg)	Fr	Beavercreek	Beavercreek, OH
F	20	Andrea Holden	6 ft 6 in (1.98 m)	215 lb (98 kg)	So	Hamilton	Hamilton, Ohio
G	21	Logan Woods	6 ft 5 in (1.96 m)	185 lb (84 kg)	RS Jr	Fairfield	Fairfield, Ohio
G	22	TJ Burch	6 ft 1 in (1.85 m)	160 lb (73 kg)	So	Ball St	Dallas, TX
F	33	Michael Imariagbe	6 ft 7 in (2.01 m)	225 lb (102 kg)	GS	Houston Christian	Houston, TX
F/C	51	Ayden Davis	6 ft 10 in (2.08 m)	225 lb (102 kg)	RS Fr	Onsted	Onsted, MI
G	55	Michael Cooper	6 ft 3 in (1.91 m)	185 lb (84 kg)	Fr	Jeffersonville	Jeffersonville, IN

Head coach

- Clint Sargent (South Dakota State)

Assistant coach(es)

- Dan Beré (Indiana)
- Travis Trice (Butler)
- Jaaron Simmons (Michigan)

Legend

- (C) Team captain
- (S) Suspended
- (I) Ineligible
- (W) Walk-on
- Injured
- Current redshirt

Roster
Last update: October 8, 2025

== Schedule and results ==
Date time, TV	Rank^{#}	Opponent^{#}	Result	Record	High points	High rebounds	High assists	Site (attendance) city, state
Exhibition
October 20, 2025*; 8:00 p.m.		vs. Ohio; CareSource Invitational-Dayton	W 63–57	–	–	–	–	UD Arena; Dayton, OH
Regular season
November 3, 2025*; 7:00 p.m., ESPN+		Franklin	W 86–37	1–0	13 – Imariagbe	7 – Etumnu	9 – Burch	Nutter Center (2,910); Fairborn, OH
November 6, 2025*; 10:00 p.m., ESPN+		at California	L 67–77	1–1	17 – Cooper	7 – Woods	4 – Cooper	Haas Pavilion (2,172); Berkeley, CA
November 11, 2025*; 7:00 p.m., ESPN+		Toledo	L 71–81	1–2	17 – Imariagbe	5 – Imariagbe	2 – 3 tied	Nutter Center (3,182); Fairborn, OH
November 15, 2025*; 3:30 p.m., PTB Live		vs. Radford; Greenbrier Tip-Off River Division	W 92–59	2–2	20 – Callaghan	10 – Imariagbe	5 – Alamutu	Colonial Hall (476); White Sulphur Springs, WV
November 16, 2025*; 12:00 p.m., PTB Live		vs. Kent State; Greenbrier Tip-Off River Division	L 72–76 ^{OT}	2–3	19 – Cooper	10 – Holden	3 – Burch	Colonial Hall; White Sulphur Springs, WV
November 20, 2025*; 7:00 p.m., ESPN+		Ohio Wesleyan	W 100–47	3–3	16 – Holden	10 – Imariagbe	7 – Cooper	Nutter Center (2,900); Fairborn, OH
November 25, 2025*; 7:00 p.m., ESPN+		at Stetson	W 79–62	4–3	19 – Cooper	7 – Imariagbe	4 – Callaghan	Insight Credit Union Arena (755); DeLand, FL
November 28, 2025*; 2:00 p.m., ESPN+		at Butler	L 69–94	4–4	17 – Callaghan	13 – Imariagbe	5 – Burch	Hinkle Fieldhouse (7,277); Indianapolis, IN
December 3, 2025; 6:30 p.m., ESPN+		at Youngstown State	L 68–69	4–5 (0–1)	15 – Imariagbe	7 – Alamutu	3 – 2 tied	Beeghly Center (1,471); Youngstown, OH
December 7, 2025; 5:00 p.m., ESPN+		Green Bay	W 86–58	5–5 (1–1)	23 – Cooper	7 – Pangonis	4 – Cooper	Nutter Center (3,056); Fairborn, OH
December 13, 2025*; 4:00 p.m., ESPN+		at Marshall	L 74–76	5–6	22 – Cooper	6 – Holden	5 – Cooper	Cam Henderson Center (3,755); Huntington, WV
December 16, 2025*; 7:00 p.m., ESPN+		Miami (OH)	L 76–83	5–7	21 – Cooper	7 – Imariagbe	3 – Burch	Nutter Center (4,892); Fairborn, OH
December 22, 2025*; 7:00 p.m., ESPN+		Eastern Michigan	W 70–64	6–7	18 – Cooper	9 – Pickett	5 – Pangonis	Nutter Center (3,070); Fairborn, OH
December 29, 2025; 7:00 p.m., ESPN+		Oakland	W 88–73	7–7 (2–1)	20 – Callaghan	7 – Pickett	4 – Burch	Nutter Center (3,142); Fairborn, OH
January 1, 2026; 2:00 p.m., ESPN+		Milwaukee	W 76–70	8–7 (3–1)	17 – Imariagbe	10 – Pickett	3 – 2 tied	Nutter Center (2,827); Fairborn, OH
January 4, 2026; 2:00 p.m., ESPN+		at IU Indy	W 81–77	9–7 (4–1)	19 – 2 tied	7 – Pickett	4 – 2 tied	The Jungle (525); Indianapolis, IN
January 9, 2026; 7:00 p.m., ESPN+		at Detroit Mercy	W 84–82	10–7 (5–1)	17 – Holden	12 – Pickett	3 – 2 tied	Calihan Hall (899); Detroit, MI
January 11, 2026; 3:00 p.m., ESPN2		at Oakland	W 94–84	11–7 (6–1)	27 – Callaghan	11 – Pickett	6 – Burch	OU Credit Union O'rena (2,774); Auburn Hills, MI
January 15, 2026; 7:00 p.m., ESPN+		Youngstown State	W 93–83	12–7 (7–1)	24 – Burch	9 – Pickett	7 – Burch	Nutter Center (4,724); Fairborn, OH
January 21, 2026; 7:00 p.m., ESPN+		Cleveland State	L 79–85	12–8 (7–2)	14 – Cooper	9 – Imariagbe	5 – Imariagbe	Nutter Center (3,630); Fairborn, OH
January 24, 2026; 7:00 p.m., ESPN+		Northern Kentucky	W 88–80	13–8 (8–2)	24 – Imariagbe	11 – Imariagbe	3 – Burch	Nutter Center (3,730); Fairborn, OH
January 30, 2026; 8:00 p.m., ESPN+		at Milwaukee	W 76–69	14–8 (9–2)	18 – Burch	11 – Imariagbe	3 – 2 tied	UW–Milwaukee Panther Arena (3,174); Milwaukee, WI
February 1, 2026; 2:00 p.m., ESPN+		at Green Bay	W 83–75	15–8 (10–2)	21 – Pickett	8 – Pickett	4 – Burch	Resch Center (2,194); Ashwaubenon, WI
February 4, 2026; 7:00 p.m., ESPNU		at Robert Morris	L 66–72	15–9 (10–3)	16 – Imariagbe	13 – Imariagbe	4 – Burch	UPMC Events Center (1,921); Moon Township, PA
February 7, 2026; 7:00 p.m., ESPN+		Purdue Fort Wayne	W 73–68	16–9 (11–3)	19 – Imariagbe	16 – Imariagbe	4 – Cooper	Nutter Center (4,298); Fairborn, OH
February 12, 2026; 7:00 p.m., ESPN+		Detroit Mercy	L 74–77	16–10 (11–4)	15 – 2 tied	7 – Callaghan	4 – 2 tied	Nutter Center (3,271); Fairborn, OH
February 15, 2026; 2:00 p.m., ESPN+		at Cleveland State	W 102–90	17–10 (12–4)	25 – Bruskotter	10 – Imariagbe	8 – Burch	Wolstein Center (2,097); Cleveland, OH
February 19, 2026; 7:00 p.m., ESPN+		IU Indy	W 85–73	18–10 (13–4)	23 – Burch	10 – Pickett	4 – Burch	Nutter Center (2,981); Fairborn, OH
February 22, 2026; 2:00 p.m., ESPNU		Robert Morris	L 68–81	18–11 (13–5)	19 – Cooper	7 – Imariagbe	2 – Burch	Nutter Center (4,659); Fairborn, OH
February 25, 2026; 7:00 p.m., ESPN+		at Purdue Fort Wayne	W 74–70	19–11 (14–5)	24 – Callaghan	7 – Pickett	4 – 2 tied	War Memorial Coliseum (2,492); Fort Wayne, IN
February 28, 2026; 7:00 p.m., ESPN+		at Northern Kentucky	W 92–91	20–11 (15–5)	19 – Pickett	16 – Imariagbe	5 – Burch	Truist Arena (3,604); Highland Heights, KY
Horizon League tournament
March 4, 2026; 7:00 p.m., ESPN+	(1)	(10) Cleveland State; First round	W 90–61	21–11	18 – Pickett	7 – Cooper	4 – Woods	Nutter Center (3,713); Fairborn, OH
March 9, 2026; 7:00 p.m., ESPNU	(1)	vs. (7) Northern Kentucky; Semifinal	W 103–90	22–11	25 – Cooper	10 – Imariagbe	3 – 3 tied	Corteva Coliseum; Indianapolis, IN
March 10, 2026; 7:00 p.m., ESPN	(1)	vs. (3) Detroit Mercy; Championship	W 66–63	23–11	19 – Burch	7 – 3 tied	3 – 2 tied	Corteva Coliseum; Indianapolis, IN
NCAA tournament
March 20, 2026; 1:50 p.m., TBS	(14 MW)	vs. (3 MW) No. 9 Virginia; First round	L 73–82	23–12	19 – Imariagbe	10 – Imariagbe	6 – Burch	Xfinity Mobile Arena (19,686); Philadelphia, PA
*Non-conference game. ^{#}Rankings from AP Poll. (#) Tournament seedings in parentheses. MW=Midwest. All times are in Eastern.

== Awards and honors ==
Horizon League awards
Award	Recipient
Coach of the Year	Clint Sargent
Defensive Player of the Year	TJ Burch
Freshman of the Year	Kellen Pickett
Newcomer of the Year	TJ Burch
All-Horizon League First Team	TJ Burch
All-Horizon League Second Team	Michael Imariagbe
All-Horizon League Defensive Team	TJ Burch
All-Horizon League Freshman Team	Michael Cooper
All-Horizon League Freshman Team	Kellen Pickett
Tournament MVP	TJ Burch
All-Horizon League Tournament Team	TJ Burch
All-Horizon League Tournament Team	Michael Cooper

== Statistics ==
Number	Name	Games	Average	Points	Assists	Rebounds	Steals	Blocks
22	TJ Burch	34	12.4	422	121	82	88	10
55	Michael Cooper	31	13.4	416	68	85	20	7
33	Michael Imariagbe	34	12.0	408	62	241	18	28
13	Solomon Callaghan	33	10.2	335	35	64	16	0
3	Dominic Pangonis	34	8.9	301	39	87	26	6
4	Kellen Pickett	35	8.5	299	38	189	16	46
20	Andrea Holden	35	6.1	215	15	138	18	42
21	Logan Woods	35	5.3	185	53	67	17	4
2	Sam Alamutu	34	2.9	97	37	81	28	5
5	Alex Bruskotter	15	4.5	68	3	22	6	0
1	Bryan Etumnu	17	3.4	57	9	41	5	3
51	Ayden Davis	3	5.0	15	0	4	2	1

== Season summary ==
=== Season highlights ===
- NCAA Tournament
- 2025–26 Regular Season Horizon League Champions
- 152 blocked shots – Raiders all-time team single-season record.
- 4 players averaged double digit points.
- TJ Burch had 88 steals and 121 assists.
- Kellen Pickett had 46 blocked shots & Andrea Holden had 42 blocked shots.
- Michael Imariagbe had 241 rebounds.

=== Season in review ===
The 2025–26 Horizon League Champions were rebuilt through recruiting and the transfer portal, along with four key players (Solomon Callaghan, Tanner Holden, Michael Imariagbe, and Logan Woods) returning from 2024–25. Putting a new team together required every athlete to put the team goals first and work together, which was exactly what Coach Sargent had in mind.

The non-conference season was unconvincing. The Raiders largely beat the teams they were significantly better than, and lost to the rest. Particularly disappointing was getting hammered by former league rival Butler on November 28. Then starting in late December, Wright State began to roll. Veteran Michael Imariagbe was physically in great shape and ready to lead. Freshman point guard Michael Cooper played beyond all expectations. TJ Burch’s quick and active defensive play excited the team with a steady diet of steals. Freshman Kellen Pickett proved ready to play tough and physical basketball, and displayed an uncanny ability to time shot blocks.

Wright State rolled off six straight Horizon League wins and never relinquished the conference lead. Freed from playing the point full time, Solomon Callaghan showed off his outside shooting. Andrea Holden piled up blocked shots in a fine sophomore season. Transfer guard Dominic Pangonis was a revelation, and coach’s dream Logan Woods was a steady leader.

Down the stretch the balanced team play made Wright State Champions. Five players averaged over 9 points a game, and no player averaged 15. Guard Sam Alamutu stepped up and played some of his best minutes at forward. The regular rotation went to nine, ten and by the end of the season eleven deep as Etumnu and Bruskotter came through with monster moments in key games that wrapped up the number one seed.

The show continued in the Horizon League Tournament with gritty team play culminating in a championship win over resilient Detroit Mercy.
