= 2026 Horizon League men's basketball tournament =

American college basketball postseason tournament

- Classification: Division I
- Season: 2025–26
- Teams: 11
- Site: Campus sites (first two rounds); Corteva Coliseum; Indianapolis, Indiana (final three rounds)
- Champions: Wright State (4th title)
- Winning coach: Clint Sargent (1st title)
- MVP: TJ Burch (Wright State)
- Television: ESPN, ESPN2, ESPNU, ESPN+

2025–26 Horizon League men's basketball standings
	Conf.				Overall
Team	W		L	PCT	W		L	PCT
Wright State †	15	–	5	.750	23	–	12	.657
Robert Morris	13	–	7	.650	22	–	11	.667
Detroit Mercy	12	–	8	.600	17	–	15	.531
Oakland	12	–	8	.600	16	–	16	.500
Green Bay	12	–	8	.600	18	–	15	.545
Purdue Fort Wayne	11	–	9	.550	17	–	15	.531
Northern Kentucky	10	–	10	.500	20	–	14	.588
Milwaukee	8	–	12	.400	12	–	20	.375
Youngstown State	8	–	12	.400	15	–	17	.469
Cleveland State	6	–	14	.300	11	–	22	.333
IU Indy	3	–	17	.150	7	–	25	.219
† 2026 Horizon League tournament winner

The 2026 Horizon League Men's Basketball Tournament was the final event of the 2025–26 men's basketball season for the Horizon League. It was held from March 2–10, 2026; play-in and first-round games were played at the home courts of the better seeds, with all remaining games held at Corteva Coliseum in Indianapolis, Indiana. The winner, Wright State, received the conference's automatic berth into the NCAA Tournament. The tournament was sponsored by Barbasol for the fourth consecutive year.

The tournament adopted a new format in 2026; instead of a traditional eleven-team single elimination bracket, the new format included reseeding after each round. The event started on campus sites with a play-in round for the bottom two teams (by conference record), followed by a ten-team first round. The five remaining teams then advanced to the final three rounds held at Corteva Coliseum. The bottom two teams by seeding played in the second round, while the other three teams were forwarded into the semifinals, with those winners advancing to the final.

== Seeds ==
All of the teams in the league participated in the tournament, with the bottom two teams starting in the play-in round. The bracket was reset after each round so that the highest remaining seed always played the lowest.

Seed	School	League Record	Tiebreaker (1)	Tiebreaker (2)
1	Wright State	15–5		
2	Robert Morris	13−7		
3	Detroit Mercy	12−8	1–1 vs. Wright State	
4	Oakland	12−8	0–2 vs. Wright State	3–1 vs. Milwaukee/Youngstown State
5	Green Bay	12−8	0–2 vs. Wright State	2–2 vs. Milwaukee/Youngstown State
6	Purdue Fort Wayne	11−9		
7	Northern Kentucky	10–10		
8	Milwaukee	8−12	2–0 vs. Youngstown State	
9	Youngstown State	8−12	0–2 vs. Milwaukee	
10	Cleveland State	6−14		
11	IU Indy	3−17		

== Schedule ==
Game	Time	Matchup	Score	Attendance	Television
Play-In Round – Monday, March 2 Campus Site
1	7:00 p.m.	No. 11 IU Indy at No. 10 Cleveland State	93–101	1,684	ESPN+
First Round – Tuesday, March 3 Campus Site
2	8:00 p.m.	No. 6 Purdue Fort Wayne at No. 5 Green Bay	56–64	2,067	ESPN+
First Round – Wednesday, March 4 Campus Sites
3	7:00 p.m.	No. 10 Cleveland State at No. 1 Wright State	61–90	3,713	ESPN+
4	7:00 p.m.	No. 9 Youngstown State at No. 2 Robert Morris	53–68	3,537	ESPN+
5	7:00 p.m.	No. 8 Milwaukee at No. 3 Detroit Mercy	63–84	3,131	ESPN+
6	7:00 p.m.	No. 7 Northern Kentucky at No. 4 Oakland	85–84	1,942	ESPN+
Second Round – Sunday, March 8 Indianapolis, IN (Corteva Coliseum)
7	3:30 p.m.	No. 5 Green Bay vs. No. 7 Northern Kentucky	76–96		ESPN+
Semifinals – Monday, March 9 Indianapolis, IN (Corteva Coliseum)
8	7:00 p.m.	No. 1 Wright State vs. No. 7 Northern Kentucky	103–90		ESPNU
9	9:30 p.m.	No. 2 Robert Morris vs. No. 3 Detroit Mercy	64–70		ESPN2
Final – Tuesday, March 10 Indianapolis, IN (Corteva Coliseum)
10	7:00 p.m.	No. 1 Wright State vs. No. 3 Detroit Mercy	66–63		ESPN
Play-In and First Round game times are Eastern Standard Time; Second, Semifinal and Final Round game times are Eastern Daylight Time. Ranking denotes tournament seed.

NOTE: Bracket is reseeded upon completion of First Round games.

== Bracket ==
Play-In Round; March 2 Campus Site; ESPN+
10	Cleveland State	101
11	IU Indy	93

First Round; March 3–4; Campus Sites; ESPN+
1	Wright State	90
10	Cleveland State	61
2	Robert Morris	68
9	Youngstown State	53
3	Detroit Mercy	84
8	Milwaukee	63
4	Oakland	84
7	Northern Kentucky	85
5	Green Bay	64
6	Purdue Fort Wayne	56

Second Round; March 8 Indianapolis, IN; ESPN+
5	Green Bay	76
7	Northern Kentucky	96

Semifinals; March 9 Indianapolis, IN; ESPNU/ESPN2
1	Wright State	103
7	Northern Kentucky	90
2	Robert Morris	64
3	Detroit Mercy	70

Final; March 10; Indianapolis, IN; ESPN
1	Wright State	66
3	Detroit Mercy	63

== Game summaries ==
=== Play-In Round ===
ESPN+

March 2
7:00 p.m. EST

Box score

No. 10 Cleveland State 101, No. 11 IU Indy 93
Scoring by half: 45–36, 56–57
Pts: 23 – Tied (3); Rebs: 8 – J. Lipscomb; Asts: 12 – P. Ryan	Pts: 23 – Tied (3); Rebs: 10 – F. Woodward; Asts: 10 – J. Edwards
Game 1

Wolstein Center
Cleveland, OH
Attendance: 1,684
Referees: Amy Booner, Randy Richardson, Edwin Young

=== First Round ===
ESPN+

March 3
7:00 p.m. CST

Box score

No. 5 Green Bay 64, No. 6 Purdue Fort Wayne 56
Scoring by half: 34–22, 30–34
Pts: 19 – M. Hall; Rebs: 5 – Tied (4); Asts: 8 – P. Ruedinger	Pts: 15 – C. Hadnott II; Rebs: 5 – Tied (2); Asts: 5 – C. Hadnott II
Game 5

Kress Events Center
Green Bay, WI
Attendance: 2,067
Referees: Bryan Anslinger, Anthony Burris, Luke Schumer

ESPN+

March 4
7:00 p.m. EST

Box score

No. 1 Wright State 90, No. 10 Cleveland State 61
Scoring by half: 37–32, 53–29
Pts: 18 – K. Pickett; Rebs: 7 – M. Cooper; Asts: 4 – L. Woods	Pts: 15 – P. Ryan; Rebs: 7 – P. Ryan; Asts: 1 – Tied (5)
Game 1

Nutter Center
Fairborn, OH
Attendance: 3,713
Referees: Kevin Brill, Daryl Gelinas, Steve McJunkins

ESPN+

March 4
7:00 p.m.

Box score

No. 2 Robert Morris 68, No. 9 Youngstown State 53
Scoring by half: 28–23, 40–30
Pts: 24 – R. Prather Jr. Rebs: 11 – D. Goode; Asts: 4 – D. Livingston	Pts: 18 – V. Salaridze; Rebs: 9 – V. Salaridze; Asts: 3 – J. Nelson
Game 2

UPMC Events Center
Moon Township, PA
Attendance: 3,537
Referees: Chad Barlow, Jim Bruno, Andy O'Brien

ESPN+

March 4
7:00 p.m.

Box score

No. 3 Detroit Mercy 84, No. 8 Milwaukee 63
Scoring by half: 38–24, 46–39
Pts: 17 – T. Nadeau; Rebs: 8 – R. Kalambay; Asts: 3 – Tied (2)	Pts: 13 – S. Konneh; Rebs: 9 – S. Konneh; Asts: 3 – E. Pippa-White
Game 3

Calihan Hall
Detroit, MI
Attendance: 3,131
Referees: John Floyd, Alfred Smith, King Whetstone

ESPN+

March 4
7:00 p.m.

Box score

No. 4 Oakland 84, No. 7 Northern Kentucky 85
Scoring by half: 31–37, 53–48
Pts: 36 – B. Robinson; Rebs: 8 – T. Naivalurua; Asts: 5 – I. Garrett	Pts: 19 – D. Oday; Rebs: 11 – L. Wells; Asts: 4 – Tied (3)
Game 4

OU Credit Union O'rena
Auburn Hills, MI
Attendance: 1,942
Referees: Randy Richardson, Luke Schumer, Sutton Simon

=== Second Round ===
ESPN+

March 8
3:30 p.m. EDT

Box score

No. 5 Green Bay 76, No. 7 Northern Kentucky 96
Scoring by half: 30–36, 46–60
Pts: 18 – Tied (2); Rebs: 4 – Tied (2); Asts: 10 – P. Ruedinger	Pts: 26 – L. Wells; Rebs: 9 – L. Wells; Asts: 9 – E. Elliott
Game 1

Corteva Coliseum
Indianapolis, IN
Referees: Steve McJunkins, Jason Phillips, Earl Walton

=== Semifinal Round ===
ESPNU

March 9
7:00 p.m. EDT

Box score

No. 1 Wright State 103, No. 7 Northern Kentucky 90
Scoring by half: 46–44, 57–46
Pts: 25 – M. Cooper; Rebs: 10 – M. Imariagbe; Asts: 3 – Tied (3)	Pts: 24 – K. Robinson; Rebs: 7 – T. Dozier; Asts: 7 – E. Elliott
Game 1

Corteva Coliseum
Indianapolis, IN
Referees: Jim Bruno, Tim Comer, Randy Richardson

ESPN2

March 9
9:30 p.m.

Box score

No. 2 Robert Morris 64, No. 3 Detroit Mercy 70
Scoring by half: 36–33, 28–37
Pts: 14 – D. Goode; Rebs: 10 – D. Goode; Asts: 7 – N. Chitikoudis	Pts: 21 – O. Lovejoy; Rebs: 10 – L. Geeter; Asts: 6 – O. Lovejoy
Game 2

Corteva Coliseum
Indianapolis, IN
Referees: Brian Dorsey, Andy O'Brien, Edwin Young

=== Final Round ===
ESPN

March 10
7:00 p.m. EDT

Box score

No. 1 Wright State 66, No. 3 Detroit Mercy 63
Scoring by half: 26–29, 40–34
Pts: 19 – T. Burch; Rebs: 7 – Tied (3); Asts: 3 – Tied (2)	Pts: 26 – O. Lovejoy; Rebs: 9 – L. Geeter; Asts: 3 – O. Lovejoy
Championship

Corteva Coliseum
Indianapolis, IN
Referees: Keith Kimble, Mike Littlewood, Earl Walton

== Awards and honors ==
=== All-Tournament Team ===
Player	Team
TJ Burch ^{MVP}	Wright State
Michael Cooper	Wright State
Legend Geeter	Detroit Mercy
Orlando Lovejoy	Detroit Mercy
L J Wells	Northern Kentucky

MVP denotes Most Valuable Player (Valeo)
