= 2025–26 Purdue Fort Wayne Mastodons men's basketball team =

American college basketball season

2025–26 Purdue Fort Wayne Mastodons men's basketball
- Conference: Horizon League
- Record: 17–15 (11–9 Horizon)
- Head coach: Jon Coffman (12th season)
- Assistant coaches: Ryan Sims (16th season); Adam Blaylock (8th season); Mike Wolf (7th season); Tyler Slick (1st season)
- Home arena: Gates Sports Center; Memorial Coliseum

2025–26 Horizon League men's basketball standings
	Conf.				Overall
Team	W		L	PCT	W		L	PCT
Wright State †	15	–	5	.750	23	–	12	.657
Robert Morris	13	–	7	.650	22	–	11	.667
Detroit Mercy	12	–	8	.600	17	–	15	.531
Oakland	12	–	8	.600	16	–	16	.500
Green Bay	12	–	8	.600	18	–	15	.545
Purdue Fort Wayne	11	–	9	.550	17	–	15	.531
Northern Kentucky	10	–	10	.500	20	–	14	.588
Milwaukee	8	–	12	.400	12	–	20	.375
Youngstown State	8	–	12	.400	15	–	17	.469
Cleveland State	6	–	14	.300	11	–	22	.333
IU Indy	3	–	17	.150	7	–	25	.219
† 2026 Horizon League tournament winner

The 2025–26 Purdue Fort Wayne Mastodons men's basketball team represented Purdue University Fort Wayne during the 2025–26 NCAA Division I men's basketball season. The Mastodons, led by 12th-year head coach Jon Coffman, played their home games at the Gates Sports Center and the Memorial Coliseum in Fort Wayne, Indiana as members of the Horizon League.

== Previous season ==
The Mastodons finished the 2024–25 season 19–13, 12–8 in Horizon League play, to finish in fifth place. They were defeated by Youngstown State in the quarterfinals of the Horizon League tournament.

== Offseason ==
=== Departures ===
Purdue Fort Wayne departures
Name	Number	Pos.	Height	Weight	Year	Hometown	Reason for departure
Rasheed Bello	0	G	6'0"	185	Senior	Chicago, IL	Graduated
Jalen Jackson	1	G	6'2"	200	Junior	Fort Wayne, IN	Transferred to Butler
Trey Lewis	2	G	6'6"	200	RS Sophomore	Ferndale, MI	Transferred to Western Michigan
Quinton Morton-Robertson	3	G	5'8"	155	Graduate student	Radford, VA	Graduated
Johnathan DeJurnett	5	F	6'8"	225	Graduate student	Memphis, TN	Graduated
De'Vion Lavergne	6	G	6'3"	170	Sophomore	Melville, LA	Transferred to Louisiana
Chandler Cuthrell	7	F	6'8"	220	Senior	Baltimore, MD	Transferred to Elon
Jordan Lomax	23	G	6'3"	160	Freshman	Brownsburg, IN	Transferred to Glen Oaks CC
Keaton Dukes	24	G	6'3"	170	Junior	Syracuse, IN	Left Program
Eric Mulder	32	F	6'8"	225	Junior	Oskaloosa, IA	Transferred to Iowa State

=== Incoming transfers ===
Purdue Fort Wayne incoming transfers
Name	Number	Pos.	Height	Weight	Year	Hometown	Previous school
Ja'Corey Lipkins	0	G	6'2"	195	Sophomore	Canton, OH	Charleston (WV)
Ebrahim Kaba	1	G	6'9"	215	RS Freshman	East Orange, NJ	St. Bonaventure
Mikale Stevenson	2	G	6'2"	190	Graduate student	Fort Wayne, IN	Grambling State
DeAndre Craig Jr.	9	G	6'0"	180	Junior	Chicago, IL	Denver
Darius Duffy	34	F	6'8"	230	Graduate student	Murray, KY	Milwaukee

== Preseason ==
On October 8, 2025, the Horizon League released their preseason poll. Purdue Fort Wayne was picked to finish fifth in the conference, while receiving one first-place vote. One player was named to the preseason All-Horizon League Second Team.

=== Preseason rankings ===
Horizon League Preseason Coaches Poll
Rank	Team	Points
1	Milwaukee	428 (24)
2	Oakland	384 (7)
3	Youngstown State	364 (2)
4	Robert Morris	345 (8)
5	Purdue Fort Wayne	287 (1)
6	Northern Kentucky	274
7	Wright State	221
8	Cleveland State	217 (2)
9	Detroit Mercy	176
10	IU Indy	115
11	Green Bay	93
(#) first-place votes

=== Preseason All-Horizon League Teams ===
Preseason All-Horizon League Teams
Team	Player	Position	Year
Second	Corey Hadnot II	Guard	Junior

== Roster ==
2025–26 Purdue Fort Wayne Mastodons men's basketball team
Players
Coaches

Pos.	#	Name	Height	Weight	Year	Previous school	Hometown
G	0	Ja'Corey Lipkins	6 ft 2 in (1.88 m)	195 lb (88 kg)	So	Charleston (WV)	Canton, Ohio
G	1	Ebrahim Kaba	6 ft 9 in (2.06 m)	215 lb (98 kg)	RS Fr	St. Bonaventure	East Orange, New Jersey
G	2	Mikale Stevenson (5th)	6 ft 2 in (1.88 m)	190 lb (86 kg)	Sr	Grambling State	Fort Wayne, Indiana
G	4	Chris Morgan	6 ft 2 in (1.88 m)	190 lb (86 kg)	RS Jr	Kaukauna High School	Kaukauna, Wisconsin
G	5	EJ Mosley	6 ft 0 in (1.83 m)	175 lb (79 kg)	Fr	St. Laurence High School	Chicago, Illinois
G	9	DeAndre Craig Jr.	6 ft 0 in (1.83 m)	180 lb (82 kg)	Jr	Denver	Chicago, Illinois
G	10	Corey Hadnot II	6 ft 3 in (1.91 m)	190 lb (86 kg)	Jr	Cypress Ranch High School	Atlanta, Georgia
F	11	Maximus Nelson	6 ft 8 in (2.03 m)	225 lb (102 kg)	Sr	Valparaiso	Appleton, Wisconsin
F	13	Deangelo Elisee	6 ft 9 in (2.06 m)	245 lb (111 kg)	GS	Triton College	Nassau, Bahamas
F	15	Yuval Levin	6 ft 8 in (2.03 m)	215 lb (98 kg)	Fr	Kiryat Ata	Haifa, Israel
G	22	Danny Kelly	6 ft 6 in (1.98 m)	215 lb (98 kg)	Fr	Bishop Luers High School	Fort Wayne, Indiana
G	23	Solomon Richard	6 ft 2 in (1.88 m)	210 lb (95 kg)	Fr	Leo High School	Leo, Indiana
G	24	Mason Shrout	6 ft 5 in (1.96 m)	180 lb (82 kg)	RS Fr	Preble Shawnee High School	Camden, Ohio
F	31	Quentin Morgan	6 ft 9 in (2.06 m)	215 lb (98 kg)	Fr	Deep Run High School	Glen Allen, Virginia
F	34	Darius Duffy	6 ft 8 in (2.03 m)	230 lb (104 kg)	GS	Milwaukee	Murray, Kentucky

Head coach

- Jon Coffman (Washington and Lee)

Assistant coach(es)

- Ryan Sims (Indianapolis)
- Adam Blaylock (Peru State)
- Mike Wolf (William Peace)
- Tyler Slick (Minnesota State)

Legend

- (C) Team captain
- (S) Suspended
- (I) Ineligible
- (W) Walk-on
- (5th) Fifth-year senior
- Injured
- Current redshirt

Roster
Last update: November 21, 2025

== Schedule and results ==
Date time, TV	Rank^{#}	Opponent^{#}	Result	Record	High points	High rebounds	High assists	Site (attendance) city, state
Exhibition
October 27, 2025*; 7:00 pm, ESPN+		Ball State	W 84–70	–	23 – Stevenson	11 – Stevenson	7 – Stevenson	Gates Sports Center (1,263); Fort Wayne, IN
Regular season
November 3, 2025*; 9:00 pm, MWN		at Grand Canyon	L 71–90	0–1	18 – Craig Jr.	4 – Hadnot II	6 – Hadnot II	Global Credit Union Arena (7,073); Phoenix, AZ
November 7, 2025*; 6:30 pm, BTN		at Ohio State	L 68–94	0–2	21 – Stevenson	3 – Tied	3 – Stevenson	Value City Arena (8,926); Columbus, OH
November 9, 2025*; 2:00 pm, ESPN+		Dominican (IL)	W 137–56	1–2	26 – Hadnot II	6 – Tied	6 – Stevenson	Gates Sports Center (970); Fort Wayne, IN
November 12, 2025*; 7:00 pm, ESPN+		at Western Michigan	L 71−83	1−3	32 – Hadnot II	10 – Duffy	6 – Craig Jr.	University Arena (1,123); Kalamazoo, MI
November 15, 2025*; 2:00 pm, ESPN+		Boyce	W 118−68	2−3	18 – Tied	8 – Duffy	3 – Tied	Gates Sports Center; Fort Wayne, IN
November 18, 2025*; 9:00 pm, ESPN+		at Utah; Acrisure Series on-campus game	L 77–85	2–4	20 – Hadnot II	6 – Tied	7 – Craig Jr.	Jon M. Huntsman Center (6,163); Salt Lake City, UT
November 21, 2025*; 8:00 pm, ESPN+		at Saint Louis; Acrisure Series on-campus game	L 60–91	2–5	15 – Stevenson	5 – Tied	4 – Hadnot II	Chaifetz Arena (4,359); St. Louis, MO
November 25, 2025*; 7:00 pm, ESPN+		Chicago State; Acrisure Series on-campus game	W 90–77	3–5	29 – Stevenson	5 – Duffy	4 – Hadnot II	Memorial Coliseum (1,613); Fort Wayne, IN
November 28, 2025*; 2:00 pm, ESPN+		Holy Cross (IN)	W 92–59	4–5	18 – Craig Jr.	8 – Hadnot II	3 – Tied	Gates Sports Center (967); Fort Wayne, IN
December 3, 2025; 7:00 pm, ESPN+		at Oakland	L 92–101	4–6 (0–1)	33 – Hadnot II	6 – Hadnot II	6 – Stevenson	OU Credit Union O'rena (1,582); Auburn Hills, MI
December 6, 2025; 2:00 pm, ESPN+		Northern Kentucky	W 79–77	5–6 (1–1)	25 – Hadnot II	8 – Duffy	7 – Stevenson	Gates Sports Center (937); Fort Wayne, IN
December 10, 2025*; 8:00 pm, ESPN+		Eastern Michigan	W 80–65	6–6	28 – Hadnot II	8 – Stevenson	4 – Craig Jr.	Memorial Coliseum (2,092); Fort Wayne, IN
December 14, 2025; 5:00 pm, ESPN+		Detroit Mercy	W 81–77	7–6 (2–1)	22 – Stevenson	8 – Hadnot II	4 – Stevenson	Memorial Coliseum (2,383); Fort Wayne, IN
December 21, 2025*; 2:00 pm, ACCNX		at Notre Dame	W 72–69	8–6	29 – Hadnot II	6 – Hadnot II	2 – Tied	Joyce Center (5,366); Notre Dame, IN
December 29, 2025; 8:00 pm, ESPN+		at Milwaukee	L 55–77	8–7 (2–2)	18 – Stevenson	5 – Stevenson	4 – Hadnot II	UW–Milwaukee Panther Arena (2,068); Milwaukee, WI
January 1, 2026; 2:00 pm, ESPN+		Green Bay	L 54–72	8–8 (2–3)	21 – Hadnot II	4 – Stevenson	5 – Craig Jr.	Memorial Coliseum (1,723); Fort Wayne, IN
January 4, 2026; 2:00 pm, ESPN+		Cleveland State	W 74–71	9–8 (3–3)	20 – Tied	5 – Tied	6 – Hadnot II	Memorial Coliseum (1,528); Fort Wayne, IN
January 7, 2026; 7:17 pm, ESPN+		at Youngstown State	W 71–69	10–8 (4–3)	14 – Hadnot II	6 – Tied	5 – Hadnot II	Beeghly Center (1,784); Youngstown, OH
January 11, 2026; 2:00 pm, ESPN+		at Robert Morris	W 79–74	11–8 (5–3)	17 – Hadnot II	6 – Duffy	3 – Stevenson	UPMC Events Center (1,313); Moon Township, PA
January 18, 2026; 2:00 pm, ESPN+		Milwaukee	W 100–82	12–8 (6–3)	34 – Stevenson	8 – Craig Jr.	6 – Tied	Gates Sports Center (1,021); Fort Wayne, IN
January 21, 2026; 7:00 pm, ESPN+		at Detroit Mercy	W 83–76	13–8 (7–3)	22 – Tied	9 – Duffy	5 – Stevenson	Calihan Hall (1,003); Detroit, MI
January 25, 2026; 2:00 pm, ESPN+		at IU Indy	Postponed until February 28 due to inclement weather					The Jungle; Indianapolis, IN
January 28, 2026; 7:00 pm, ESPN+		Oakland	L 65–74	13–9 (7–4)	22 – Hadnot II	6 – Hadnot II	6 – Hadnot II	Gates Sports Center (1,243); Fort Wayne, IN
January 31, 2026; 1:00 pm, ESPN+		Robert Morris	W 83–71	14–9 (8–4)	21 – Hadnot II	7 – Hadnot II	4 – Hadnot II	Memorial Coliseum (1,974); Fort Wayne, IN
February 4, 2026; 7:00 pm, ESPN+		Youngstown State	L 61–90	14–10 (8–5)	17 – Hadnot II	5 – Craig Jr.	3 – Craig Jr.	Memorial Coliseum (1,728); Fort Wayne, IN
February 7, 2026; 7:00 pm, ESPN+		at Wright State	L 68–73	14–11 (8–6)	22 – Hadnot II	7 – Duffy	5 – Hadnot II	Nutter Center (4,298); Fairborn, OH
February 12, 2026; 7:00 pm, ESPN+		at Green Bay	L 59–76	14–12 (8–7)	16 – Hadnot II	6 – Duffy	3 – Craig Jr.	Kress Events Center (2,531); Green Bay, WI
February 15, 2026; 2:00 pm, ESPN+		IU Indy	W 83−78	15−12 (9−7)	31 – Hadnot II	7 – Elisee	5 – Hadnot II	Memorial Coliseum (2,770); Fort Wayne, IN
February 18, 2026; 7:00 pm, ESPN+		at Northern Kentucky	L 71−87	15−13 (9−8)	24 – Craig Jr.	6 – Tied	4 – Stevenson	Truist Arena (2,066); Highland Heights, KY
February 22, 2026; 2:00 pm, ESPN+		at Cleveland State	W 92−86	16−13 (10−8)	28 – Hadnot II	9 – Elisee	7 – Hadnot II	Wolstein Center (2,186); Cleveland, OH
February 25, 2026; 7:00 pm, ESPN+		Wright State	L 70–74	16–14 (10–9)	26 – Hadnot II	6 – Tied	8 – Hadnot II	Memorial Coliseum (2,492); Fort Wayne, IN
February 28, 2026; 2:00 pm, ESPN+		at IU Indy	W 87–81	17–14 (11–9)	17 – Hadnot II	9 – Nelson	3 – Tied	The Jungle (1,117); Indianapolis, IN
2026 Horizon League tournament
March 3, 2026; 7:00 pm, ESPN+	(6)	at (5) Green Bay; First round	L 56–64	17–15	15 – Hadnot II	5 – Tied	5 – Hadnot II	Kress Events Center (2,067); Green Bay, WI
*Non-conference game. ^{#}Rankings from AP Poll. (#) Tournament seedings in parentheses. All times are in Eastern.
