= 2025–26 Northern Kentucky Norse men's basketball team =

American college basketball season

2025–26 Northern Kentucky Norse men's basketball
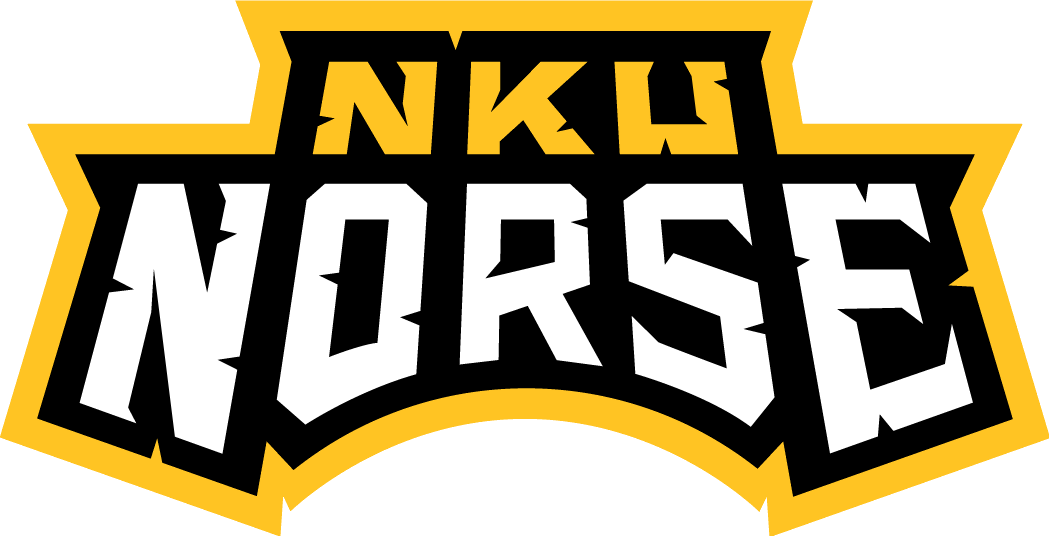
- Conference: Horizon League
- Record: 20–14 (10–10 Horizon)
- Head coach: Darrin Horn (7th season)
- Assistant coaches: Simon McCormack; David Harris; R.J. Evans; Ryan Peterson
- Home arena: Truist Arena

2025–26 Horizon League men's basketball standings
	Conf.				Overall
Team	W		L	PCT	W		L	PCT
Wright State †	15	–	5	.750	23	–	12	.657
Robert Morris	13	–	7	.650	22	–	11	.667
Detroit Mercy	12	–	8	.600	17	–	15	.531
Oakland	12	–	8	.600	16	–	16	.500
Green Bay	12	–	8	.600	18	–	15	.545
Purdue Fort Wayne	11	–	9	.550	17	–	15	.531
Northern Kentucky	10	–	10	.500	20	–	14	.588
Milwaukee	8	–	12	.400	12	–	20	.375
Youngstown State	8	–	12	.400	15	–	17	.469
Cleveland State	6	–	14	.300	11	–	22	.333
IU Indy	3	–	17	.150	7	–	25	.219
† 2026 Horizon League tournament winner

The 2025–26 Northern Kentucky Norse men's basketball team represented Northern Kentucky University during the 2025–26 NCAA Division I men's basketball season. The Norse, led by seventh-year head coach Darrin Horn, played their home games at Truist Arena in Highland Heights, Kentucky as members of the Horizon League.

== Previous season ==
The Norse finished the 2024–25 season 17–16, 11–9 in Horizon League play, to finish in a tie for sixth place. They defeated Detroit Mercy, before falling to Cleveland State in the quarterfinals of the Horizon League tournament.

== Preseason ==
On October 8, 2025, the Horizon League released their preseason poll. Northern Kentucky was picked to finish sixth in the conference. One player was named to the preseason All-Horizon League Second Team.

=== Preseason rankings ===
Horizon League Preseason Coaches Poll
Rank	Team	Points
1	Milwaukee	428 (24)
2	Oakland	384 (7)
3	Youngstown State	364 (2)
4	Robert Morris	345 (8)
5	Purdue Fort Wayne	287 (1)
6	Northern Kentucky	274
7	Wright State	221
8	Cleveland State	217 (2)
9	Detroit Mercy	176
10	IU Indy	115
11	Green Bay	93
(#) first-place votes

=== Preseason All-Horizon League Teams ===
Preseason All-Horizon League Teams
Team	Player	Position	Year
Second	Dan Gherezgher	Guard	Senior

== Roster ==
2025–26 Northern Kentucky Norse men's basketball team
Players
Coaches

Pos.	#	Name	Height	Weight	Year	Previous school	Hometown
G	0	Dan Gherezgher	6 ft 4 in (1.93 m)	185 lb (84 kg)	Sr	Michigan Tech	Brookfield, Wisconsin
G/F	1	Ryan Tolliver	6 ft 7 in (2.01 m)	220 lb (100 kg)	Fr	Northwest Catholic High School	Hartford, Connecticut
G	3	Shawn Nelson	6 ft 3 in (1.91 m)	195 lb (88 kg)	GS	Barton College	Miami, Florida
G	4	Bryce Darbyshire	6 ft 4 in (1.93 m)	180 lb (82 kg)	RS So	Sycamore High School	Cincinnati, Ohio
F	5	LJ Wells	6 ft 8 in (2.03 m)	220 lb (100 kg)	Sr	Eau Claire Memorial High School	Eau Claire, Wisconsin
G	6	Ethan Elliott	6 ft 3 in (1.91 m)	190 lb (86 kg)	Fr	Joondalup Wolves	Perth, Australia
G	8	Donovan Oday	6 ft 2 in (1.88 m)	195 lb (88 kg)	Sr	Cal State Fullerton	Arlington, Texas
G/F	10	Donovan Rakotonanahary	6 ft 6 in (1.98 m)	190 lb (86 kg)	RS Fr	Oak Hill Academy	Antananarivo, Madagascar
G	11	Tae Dozier	6 ft 5 in (1.96 m)	170 lb (77 kg)	GS	Georgetown College	Louisville, Kentucky
F	12	Addison Archer	6 ft 9 in (2.06 m)	195 lb (88 kg)	Jr	Ranger College	Charlotte, North Carolina
F	17	Juanma Ruiz	6 ft 9 in (2.06 m)	200 lb (91 kg)	Fr	Real Betis	Begíjar, Spain
G	22	JJ Apathjang	6 ft 4 in (1.93 m)	185 lb (84 kg)	Fr	Judge Memorial Catholic High School	Salt Lake City, Utah
F	24	Kael Robinson	6 ft 7 in (2.01 m)	220 lb (100 kg)	GS	Montana State Billings	Hamilton, New Zealand
G	26	Mitchel Minor	5 ft 10 in (1.78 m)	165 lb (75 kg)	Sr	Scott High School	Taylor Mill, Kentucky

Head coach

- Darrin Horn (Western Kentucky)

Assistant coach(es)

- Simon McCormack (American)
- David Harris (Ashland)
- R.J. Evans (Connecticut)
- Ryan Peterson (Lynn)

Legend

- (C) Team captain
- (S) Suspended
- (I) Ineligible
- (W) Walk-on
- Injured
- Current redshirt

Roster
Last update: November 19, 2025

== Schedule and results ==
Date time, TV	Rank^{#}	Opponent^{#}	Result	Record	High points	High rebounds	High assists	Site (attendance) city, state
Exhibition
October 20, 2025*; 6:00 pm		vs. Ashland; CareSource Invitational — Dayton	W 83–72	–	17 – Tied	16 – Wells	7 – Elliott	UD Arena; Dayton, OH
Regular season
November 3, 2025*; 7:00 pm, ESPN+		UC Clermont	W 126–69	1–0	22 – Robinson	10 – Wells	9 – Elliott	Truist Arena (2,009); Highland Heights, KY
November 8, 2025*; 3:00 pm, SECN+		at No. 18 Tennessee	L 56–95	1–1	14 – Tied	8 – Robinson	3 – Elliott	Thompson–Boling Arena (18,661); Knoxville, TN
November 12, 2025*; 7:00 pm, ESPN+		at East Tennessee State	L 63–75	1–2	24 – Gherezgher	7 – Wells	4 – Oday	Freedom Hall Civic Center (2,307); Johnson City, TN
November 16, 2025*; 1:00 pm, ESPN+		Cumberlands	W 101–73	2–2	19 – Oday	8 – Wells	5 – Elliott	Truist Arena (1,743); Highland Heights, KY
November 20, 2025*; 7:00 pm, ESPN+		at Central Michigan	W 90–66	3–2	20 – Oday	9 – Wells	8 – Elliott	McGuirk Arena (1,402); Mount Pleasant, MI
November 24, 2025*; 7:00 pm, ESPN+		Eastern Kentucky	W 82–71	4–2	19 – Gherezgher	11 – Wells	4 – Gherezgher	Truist Arena (2,346); Highland Heights, KY
November 26, 2025*; 2:00 pm, ESPN+/FDSNOH		Wofford	W 93–83	5–2	27 – Oday	8 – Wells	4 – Elliott	Truist Arena (1,574); Highland Heights, KY
November 29, 2025*; 1:00 pm, ESPN+		Boston University	W 74–65	6–2	23 – Gherezgher	6 – Dozier	3 – Oday	Truist Arena (1,502); Highland Heights, KY
December 3, 2025; 7:00 pm, ESPN+		Cleveland State	W 95–80	7–2 (1–0)	21 – Wells	10 – Wells	5 – Elliott	Truist Arena (1,814); Highland Heights, KY
December 6, 2025; 2:00 pm, ESPN+		at Purdue Fort Wayne	L 77–79	7–3 (1–1)	27 – Gherezgher	7 – Tied	10 – Elliott	Gates Sports Center (937); Fort Wayne, IN
December 9, 2025*; 7:00 pm, ESPN+		Brescia	W 92–53	8–3	23 – Robinson	9 – Wells	3 – Tied	Truist Arena (1,502); Highland Heights, KY
December 13, 2025*; 2:00 pm, ESPN+		at Bellarmine	W 80–76	9–3	17 – Tied	8 – Wells	3 – Tied	Knights Hall (1,227); Louisville, KY
December 17, 2025; 7:00 pm, ESPN+		Oakland	L 77–82	9–4 (1–2)	22 – Robinson	9 – Wells	6 – Wells	Truist Arena (1,714); Highland Heights, KY
December 21, 2025*; 12:00 pm, ESPN+/FDSNOH		Charleston	L 74–85	9–5	22 – Robinson	9 – Robinson	3 – Gherezgher	Truist Arena (2,828); Highland Heights, KY
December 29, 2025; 7:00 pm, ESPN+		at Robert Morris	W 79–77	10–5 (2–2)	16 – Oday	8 – Wells	3 – Robinson	UPMC Events Center (1,387); Moon Township, PA
January 1, 2026; 2:00 pm, ESPN+		IU Indy	W 81–72	11–5 (3–2)	18 – Oday	9 – Wells	7 – Elliott	Truist Arena (1,645); Highland Heights, KY
January 4, 2026; 4:00 pm, ESPN+		Youngstown State	W 94–79	12–5 (4–2)	26 – Gherezgher	11 – Wells	5 – Gherezgher	Truist Arena (1,930); Highland Heights, KY
January 9, 2026; 8:00 pm, ESPN+		at Milwaukee	W 85–67	13–5 (5–2)	29 – Robinson	10 – Dozier	8 – Elliott	UW–Milwaukee Panther Arena (1,747); Milwaukee, WI
January 11, 2026; 2:00 pm, ESPN+		at Green Bay	L 78–80	13–6 (5–3)	31 – Oday	7 – Wells	7 – Elliott	Kress Events Center (1,594); Green Bay, WI
January 15, 2026; 7:00 pm, ESPN+		Detroit Mercy	W 96–71	14–6 (6–3)	35 – Wells	7 – Wells	7 – Elliott	Truist Arena (2,106); Highland Heights, KY
January 17, 2026; 7:00 pm, ESPN+		Robert Morris	L 89–92 ^{OT}	14–7 (6–4)	38 – Oday	8 – Wells	5 – Dozier	Truist Arena (2,182); Highland Heights, KY
January 24, 2026; 7:00 pm, ESPN+		at Wright State	L 80–88	14–8 (6–5)	30 – Gherezgher	5 – Dozier	2 – Tied	Nutter Center (3,730); Fairborn, OH
January 30, 2026; 7:00 pm, ESPN+		at Detroit Mercy	L 77–90	14–9 (6–5)	33 – Oday	7 – Robinson	4 – Gherezgher	Calihan Hall (1,105); Detroit, MI
February 1, 2026; 3:00 pm, ESPN+		at Oakland	L 65–76	14–10 (6–6)	15 – Oday	8 – Dozier	5 – Oday	OU Credit Union O'rena (2,074); Auburn Hills, MI
February 4, 2026; 7:00 pm, ESPN+		Green Bay	L 84–87 ^{OT}	14–11 (6–7)	28 – Oday	8 – Oday	6 – Gherezgher	Truist Arena (2,212); Highland Heights, KY
February 7, 2026; 5:00 pm, ESPN+/FDSNOH		Milwaukee	W 67–62	15−11 (7−8)	22 – Gherezgher	6 – Nelson	6 – Elliott	Truist Arena (2,903); Highland Heights, KY
February 12, 2026; 6:30 pm, ESPN+		at IU Indy	W 84−81	16−11 (8−8)	26 – Oday	9 – Dozier	5 – Gherezgher	The Jungle (712); Indianapolis, IN
February 18, 2026; 7:00 pm, ESPN+/FDSNOH		Purdue Fort Wayne	W 87−71	17−11 (9−8)	29 – Wells	15 – Dozier	5 – Wells	Truist Arena (2,066); Highland Heights, KY
February 22, 2026; 2:00 pm, ESPN+		at Youngstown State	L 58–64	17–12 (9–9)	18 – Oday	7 – Robinson	4 – Elliott	Beeghly Center (2,344); Youngstown, OH
February 25, 2026; 7:00 pm, ESPN+		at Cleveland State	W 81–70	18–12 (10–9)	24 – Wells	12 – Wells	8 – Elliott	Wolstein Center (2,458); Cleveland, OH
February 28, 2026; 7:00 pm, ESPN+		Wright State	L 91–92	18–13 (10–10)	21 – Tied	5 – Tied	3 – Tied	Truist Arena (3,604); Highland Heights, KY
Horizon League tournament
March 4, 2026; 7:00 pm, ESPN+	(7)	at (4) Oakland; First round	W 85–84	19–13	19 – Oday	11 – Wells	4 – Tied	OU Credit Union O'rena (1,942); Auburn Hills, MI
March 8, 2026; 3:30 pm, ESPN+	(7)	vs. (5) Green Bay; Second round	W 96–76	20–13	26 – Wells	9 – Wells	9 – Elliott	Corteva Coliseum; Indianapolis, IN
March 9, 2026; 7:00 pm, ESPNU	(7)	vs. (1) Wright State; Semifinals	L 90–103	20–14	24 – Robinson	7 – Dozier	7 – Elliott	Corteva Coliseum; Indianapolis, IN
*Non-conference game. ^{#}Rankings from AP Poll. (#) Tournament seedings in parentheses. All times are in Eastern.
