= 2025–26 Detroit Mercy Titans men's basketball team =

American college basketball season

2025–26 Detroit Mercy Titans men's basketball
- Conference: Horizon League
- Record: 17–15 (12–8 Horizon)
- Head coach: Mark Montgomery (2nd season)
- Assistant coaches: Lamar Chapman; Mike Peck; LaMonta Stone; Chris MacMartin; Ian Jones Collyn Richardson
- Home arena: Calihan Hall

2025–26 Horizon League men's basketball standings
	Conf.				Overall
Team	W		L	PCT	W		L	PCT
Wright State †	15	–	5	.750	23	–	12	.657
Robert Morris	13	–	7	.650	22	–	11	.667
Detroit Mercy	12	–	8	.600	17	–	15	.531
Oakland	12	–	8	.600	16	–	16	.500
Green Bay	12	–	8	.600	18	–	15	.545
Purdue Fort Wayne	11	–	9	.550	17	–	15	.531
Northern Kentucky	10	–	10	.500	20	–	14	.588
Milwaukee	8	–	12	.400	12	–	20	.375
Youngstown State	8	–	12	.400	15	–	17	.469
Cleveland State	6	–	14	.300	11	–	22	.333
IU Indy	3	–	17	.150	7	–	25	.219
† 2026 Horizon League tournament winner

The 2025–26 Detroit Mercy Titans men's basketball team represented the University of Detroit Mercy during the 2025–26 NCAA Division I men's basketball season. The Titans, led by second-year head coach Mark Montgomery, played their home games at Calihan Hall in Detroit, Michigan as members of the Horizon League.

== Previous season ==
The Titans finished the 2024–25 season 8–24, 4–16 in Horizon League play, to finish in tenth place. They were defeated by Northern Kentucky in the first round of the Horizon League tournament.

== Preseason ==
On October 8, 2025, the Horizon League released their preseason poll. Detroit Mercy was picked to finish ninth in the conference. One player was named to the preseason All-Horizon League First Team.

=== Preseason rankings ===
Horizon League Preseason Coaches Poll
Rank	Team	Points
1	Milwaukee	428 (24)
2	Oakland	384 (7)
3	Youngstown State	364 (2)
4	Robert Morris	345 (8)
5	Purdue Fort Wayne	287 (1)
6	Northern Kentucky	274
7	Wright State	221
8	Cleveland State	217 (2)
9	Detroit Mercy	176
10	IU Indy	115
11	Green Bay	93
(#) first-place votes

=== Preseason All-Horizon League Teams ===
Preseason All-Horizon League Teams
Team	Player	Position	Year
First	Orlando Lovejoy	Guard	Senior

== Roster ==
2025–26 Detroit Mercy Titans men's basketball team
Players
Coaches

Pos.	#	Name	Height	Weight	Year	Previous school	Hometown
G	1	Tyler Spratt	6 ft 5 in (1.96 m)	200 lb (91 kg)	RS Fr	Cleveland State	Farmington, Michigan
G/F	2	Je'kel Cotton	6 ft 6 in (1.98 m)	190 lb (86 kg)	Fr	Lima Senior High School	Lima, Ohio
G/F	4	Keshawn Fisher	6 ft 7 in (2.01 m)	200 lb (91 kg)	Fr	Overtime Elite	Detroit, Michigan
G	5	Orlando Lovejoy	6 ft 3 in (1.91 m)	190 lb (86 kg)	Sr	Eastern Michigan	Detroit, Michigan
C	6	Xavier Istomin-Monroe	7 ft 1 in (2.16 m)	235 lb (107 kg)	Fr	Royal Crown Academic School	Sydney, Australia
G/F	7	Ayden Carter	6 ft 5 in (1.96 m)	200 lb (91 kg)	Jr	Walsh	Fremont, Ohio
G	10	Nate Johnson	6 ft 7 in (2.01 m)	215 lb (98 kg)	So	Grand Rapids Christian High School	Grand Rapids, Michigan
G	11	Lance Stone	5 ft 8 in (1.73 m)	160 lb (73 kg)	Fr	Renaissance High School	Detroit, Michigan
G	13	Jared Lary	6 ft 6 in (1.98 m)	200 lb (91 kg)	Sr	Aquinas	Grand Rapids, Michigan
F	20	London Maiden	6 ft 8 in (2.03 m)	250 lb (113 kg)	Jr	Blinn College	Cleveland, Ohio
F	23	Legend Geeter	6 ft 8 in (2.03 m)	230 lb (104 kg)	Sr	Eastern Michigan	River Rouge, Michigan
G	25	Zak Abdalla	6 ft 2 in (1.88 m)	180 lb (82 kg)	Fr	Trinity Prep	Las Vegas, Nevada
F	30	Ryan Kalambay	6 ft 9 in (2.06 m)	240 lb (109 kg)	So	Fort Erie Academy	Brampton, Ontario
G	33	TJ Nadeau	6 ft 5 in (1.96 m)	205 lb (93 kg)	So	Detroit Catholic Central High School	South Lyon, Michigan

Head coach

- Mark Montgomery (Michigan State)

Assistant coach(es)

- Lamar Chapman (Lane College)
- Mike Peck (Northwood)
- LaMonta Stone (UM–Dearborn)
- Chris MacMartin (Northern Illinois)
- Ian Jones (East Carolina)
- Collyn Richardson (Toledo)

Legend

- (C) Team captain
- (S) Suspended
- (I) Ineligible
- (W) Walk-on
- Injured
- Current redshirt

Roster
Last update: November 23, 2025

== Schedule and results ==
Date time, TV	Rank^{#}	Opponent^{#}	Result	Record	High points	High rebounds	High assists	Site (attendance) city, state
Exhibition
October 24, 2025*; 7:00 pm		Grand Valley State	W 86–70	–	17 – Nadeau	8 – Johnson	4 – Lovejoy	Calihan Hall (1,011); Detroit, MI
October 30, 2025*; 5:00 pm		vs. Central State; Horatio Williams Foundation Hoops & Culture Event	W 75–67	–	21 – Lovejoy	10 – Maiden	4 – Lovejoy	Wayne State Fieldhouse; Detroit, MI
Regular season
November 3, 2025*; 8:00 pm, ESPN+		at UIC	L 71–91	0–1	18 – Carter	5 – Tied	3 – Lovejoy	Credit Union 1 Arena (1,155); Chicago, IL
November 7, 2025*; 7:00 pm, ACCNX		at Notre Dame	L 70–102	0–2	24 – Nadeau	7 – Tied	6 – Lovejoy	Joyce Center (7,608); Notre Dame, IN
November 11, 2025*; 7:00 pm, ESPN+		Cleary	W 92–54	1–2	16 – Nadeau	10 – Cotton	6 – Stone	Calihan Hall (1,001); Detroit, MI
November 15, 2025*; 1:00 pm, ESPN+		at Toledo	L 83−90	1−3	18 – Lovejoy	8 – Spratt	5 – Lovejoy	Savage Arena (3,797); Toledo, OH
November 18, 2025*; 7:00 pm, ESPN+		Eastern Michigan	L 62−72	1−4	20 – Lovejoy	6 – Lovejoy	2 – Lovejoy	Calihan Hall (1,839); Detroit, MI
November 21, 2025*; 6:30 pm, BTN		at No. 17 Michigan State	L 56–84	1–5	14 – Lovejoy	6 – Geeter	4 – Lovejoy	Breslin Center (14,797); East Lansing, MI
November 23, 2025*; 6:00 pm, ESPN+		at DePaul	L 75–95	1–6	14 – Nadeau	5 – Geeter	7 – Stone	Wintrust Arena (3,339); Chicago, IL
November 29, 2025*; 1:00 pm, ESPN+		at Niagara	W 70–66	2–6	16 – Maiden	8 – Maiden	4 – Tied	Gallagher Center (747); Lewiston, NY
December 3, 2025; 7:00 pm, ESPN+		IU Indy	W 92–78	3–6 (1–0)	21 – Carter	9 – Maiden	4 – Tied	Calihan Hall (787); Detroit, MI
December 6, 2025; 2:00 pm, ESPN+		at Cleveland State	W 71–59	4–6 (2–0)	26 – Nadeau	9 – Geeter	6 – Lovejoy	Wolstein Center (1,655); Cleveland, OH
December 14, 2025; 5:00 pm, ESPN+		at Purdue Fort Wayne	L 77–81	4–7 (2–1)	16 – Nadeau	9 – Fisher	3 – Geeter	Memorial Coliseum (2,383); Fort Wayne, IN
December 20, 2025*; 1:00 pm, ESPN+		Siena Heights	W 91–60	5–7	20 – Nadeau	7 – Kalambay	3 – Lovejoy	Calihan Hall (1,313); Detroit, MI
December 29, 2025; 6:30 pm, ESPN+		at Youngstown State	W 73–68	6–7 (3–1)	22 – Lovejoy	10 – Kalambay	3 – Tied	Beeghly Center (1,519); Youngstown, OH
January 2, 2026; 7:00 pm, ESPN+		Robert Morris	L 77–85	6–8 (3–2)	20 – Tied	5 – Kalambay	5 – Lovejoy	Calihan Hall (1,443); Detroit, MI
January 9, 2026; 7:00 pm, ESPN+		Wright State	L 82–84	6–9 (3–3)	22 – Geeter	6 – Tied	3 – Tied	Calihan Hall (899); Detroit, MI
January 11, 2026; 1:00 pm, ESPN+		Cleveland State	W 94–84	7–9 (4–3)	19 – Spratt	10 – Kalambay	9 – Lovejoy	Calihan Hall (1,113); Detroit, MI
January 15, 2026; 7:00 pm, ESPN+		at Northern Kentucky	L 71–96	7–10 (4–4)	14 – Nadeau	6 – Maiden	3 – Lovejoy	Truist Arena (2,106); Highland Heights, KY
January 17, 2026; 2:00 pm, ESPN+		at IU Indy	W 80–77	8–10 (5–4)	16 – Spratt	9 – Lovejoy	4 – Tied	The Jungle (742); Indianapolis, IN
January 21, 2026; 7:00 pm, ESPN+		Purdue Fort Wayne	L 76–83	8–11 (5–5)	22 – Nadeau	10 – Geeter	4 – Lovejoy	Calihan Hall (1,003); Detroit, MI
January 24, 2026; 3:00 pm, ESPN+		Oakland; Metro Series	L 87–95	8–12 (5–6)	24 – Geeter	11 – Kalambay	7 – Stone	Calihan Hall (2,833); Detroit, MI
January 30, 2026; 7:00 pm, ESPN+		Northern Kentucky	W 90–77	9–12 (6–6)	28 – Spratt	10 – Geeter	6 – Tied	Calihan Hall (1,105); Detroit, MI
February 4, 2026; 8:00 pm, ESPN+		at Milwaukee	W 76–63	10–12 (7–6)	18 – Nadeau	10 – Kalambay	5 – Tied	UW–Milwaukee Panther Arena (1,739); Milwaukee, WI
February 7, 2026; 2:00 pm, ESPN+		at Green Bay	L 63–76	10–13 (7–7)	20 – Nadeau	8 – Geeter	3 – Lovejoy	Resch Center (1,980); Ashwaubenon, WI
February 12, 2026; 7:00 pm, ESPN+		at Wright State	W 77–74	11–13 (8–7)	18 – Lovejoy	8 – Geeter	4 – Spratt	Nutter Center (3,271); Fairborn, OH
February 15, 2026; 1:00 pm, ESPN+		Youngstown State	W 76–70	12–13 (9–7)	15 – Spratt	9 – Spratt	3 – Tied	Calihan Hall (1,111); Detroit, MI
February 20, 2026; 7:00 pm, ESPN+		Milwaukee	W 91–86	13–13 (10–7)	15 – Nadeau	8 – Geeter	4 – Tied	Calihan Hall (1,213); Detroit, MI
February 22, 2026; 1:00 pm, ESPN+		Green Bay	W 74–70	14–13 (11–7)	33 – Lovejoy	8 – Geeter	5 – Tied	Calihan Hall (1,887); Detroit, MI
February 25, 2026; 7:00 pm, ESPN+		at Robert Morris	L 62–73	14–14 (11–8)	19 – Lovejoy	9 – Kalambay	4 – Lovejoy	UPMC Events Center (1,568); Moon Township, PA
February 28, 2026; 3:00 pm, ESPN+		at Oakland; Metro Series	W 95–89	15–14 (12–8)	29 – Lovejoy	6 – Tied	6 – Geeter	OU Credit Union O'rena (3,721); Auburn Hills, MI
Horizon League tournament
March 4, 2026; 7:00 pm, ESPN+	(3)	(8) Milwaukee; First round	W 84–63	16–14	17 – Nadeau	8 – Kalambay	3 – Tied	Calihan Hall (3,131); Detroit, MI
March 9, 2026; 9:30 p.m., ESPN2	(3)	vs. (2) Robert Morris; Semifinals	W 70–64	17–14	21 – Lovejoy	10 – Geeter	6 – Lovejoy	Corteva Coliseum; Indianapolis, IN
March 10, 2026; 7:00 p.m., ESPN	(3)	vs. (1) Wright State; Championship	L 63–66	17–15	26 – Lovejoy	9 – Geeter	3 – Lovejoy	Corteva Coliseum; Indianapolis, IN
*Non-conference game. ^{#}Rankings from AP Poll. (#) Tournament seedings in parentheses. All times are in Eastern.
