= Clint Sargent =

American basketball coach (born 1988)

Current position
- Title: Head coach
- Team: Wright State
- Conference: Horizon League
- Record: 38–30 (.559)

Biographical details
- Born: September 10, 1988 (age 38)

Playing career
- 2007–2011: South Dakota State
- 2011–2013: USC Heidelberg
- Position: Guard

Coaching career (HC unless noted)
- 2016–2021: Wright State (assistant)
- 2021–2024: Wright State (AHC)
- 2024–present: Wright State

Administrative career (AD unless noted)
- 2013–2016: South Dakota State (DO)

Head coaching record
- Overall: 38–30 (.559)
- Tournaments: 0—1 (NCAA)

Accomplishments and honors

Championships
- Horizon League regular season (2026); Horizon League tournament (2026)

Awards
- Horizon League Coach of the Year (2026)

Clinton Berl Sargent (born September 10, 1988) is an American basketball coach who is the current head coach of the Wright State Raiders men's basketball team. He played college basketball for the South Dakota State Jackrabbits and later for two seasons professionally with USC Heidelberg. He coached at South Dakota State from 2013–14 to 2015–16 and was an assistant at Wright State from 2016–17 to 2023–24 before receiving a promotion to head coach in 2024.

== Early life and playing career ==
Sargent grew up in South Sioux City, Nebraska. He attended Bishop Heelan Catholic High School in Sioux City, Iowa, where he played basketball and football, being a captain of both. In basketball, he averaged over 20 points as a junior and averaged 19.7 points, four rebounds and four assists as a senior. He was a first-team all-metro, first-team all-conference, first-team all-district, first-team all-northwest Iowa and first-team all-state basketball player in his last two years and finished ninth in city history in scoring, with over 1,000 points. He was chosen his class' Iowa Newspaper Association Player of the Year in his senior year, was named his team's most valuable player, and also captained the all-northwest Iowa squad. He also was an all-metro football selection at quarterback.

Sargent played college basketball for the South Dakota State Jackrabbits (SDSU) under head coach Scott Nagy. A starter from the beginning, he was the team's leader in assists as a freshman, totaled 68 three-point shots as a sophomore, and posted the same mark as a junior while being named all-Summit League. He set the team record for three-pointers as a senior and repeated as an all-Summit League selection, finishing his career with over 1,500 points scored, then-fifth all-time in SDSU history; he averaged more than two three-point shots made per game in his collegiate career.

After his collegiate career, Sargent signed to play professionally in Germany with USC Heidelberg, a team in the country's second-tier, for the 2011–12 season. He played two seasons for the team in the league ProA.

== Coaching career ==
Sargent returned to South Dakota State in 2013–14 as their director of operations. He remained in the position with the school until leaving to become an assistant with the Wright State Raiders in 2016. At Wright State, he joined his former South Dakota State coach, Scott Nagy.

Sargent held the position of assistant coach at Wright State before receiving a promotion to associate head coach in 2021. In his time as an assistant with the team – from 2016–17 to 2023–24 – he helped them win Horizon League titles five times while reaching the NCAA Tournament twice (2018, 2022), including the first Division I Tournament win in team history in 2022 over the Bryant Bulldogs. With duties including player development and recruiting, he helped the team have 26 all-Horizon League selections in his tenure as an assistant coach. After coach Nagy left in 2024 to become the head coach of the Southern Illinois Salukis, Sargent was promoted to head coach of Wright State on March 28, 2024.

== Head coaching record ==
Record table
Season	Team	Overall	Conference	Standing	Postseason
Wright State Raiders (Horizon League) (2024–present)
2024–25	Wright State	15–18	8–12	8th	
2025–26	Wright State	23–12	15–5	1st	NCAA Division I Round of 64
Wright State:		38–30 (.559)	23–17 (.575)		
Total:		38–30 (.559)			
National champion Postseason invitational champion Conference regular season champion Conference regular season and conference tournament champion Division regular season champion Division regular season and conference tournament champion Conference tournament champion

== Personal life ==
Sargent married Jill Young, a basketball player at South Dakota State and later in Germany.
