= Mark Montgomery (basketball) =

American basketball player and coach (born 1970)

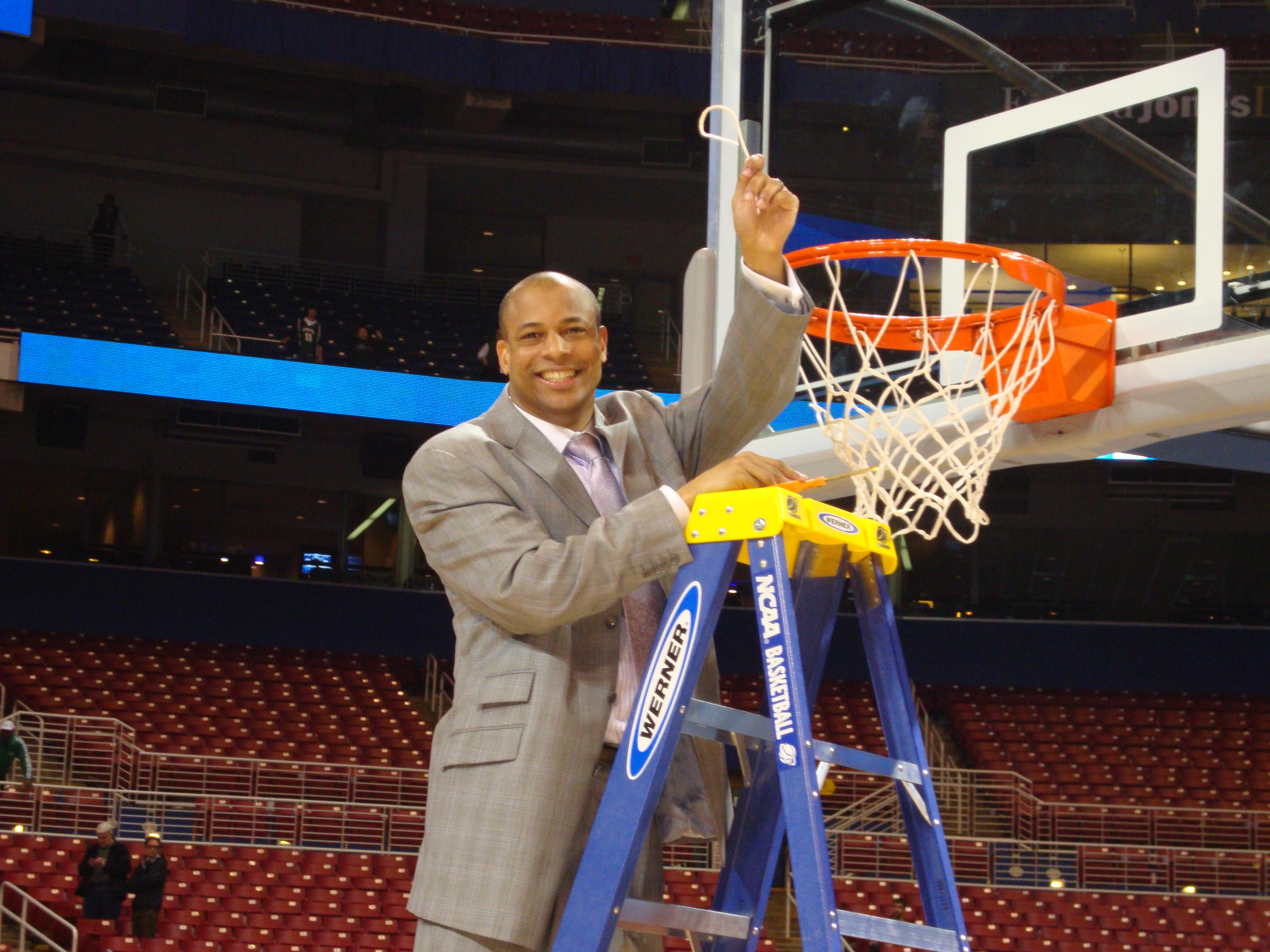

Current position
- Title: Head coach
- Team: Detroit Mercy
- Conference: Horizon League
- Record: 25–39 (.391)

Biographical details
- Born: April 1, 1970 (age 56)

Playing career
- 1988–1992: Michigan State
- 1993–1994: BC Statyba

Coaching career (HC unless noted)
- 1997–2002: Central Michigan (assistant)
- 2002–2011: Michigan State (assistant)
- 2011–2021: Northern Illinois
- 2021: Detroit Mercy (assistant)
- 2021–2024: Michigan State (assistant)
- 2024–present: Detroit Mercy

Administrative career (AD unless noted)
- 2021: Michigan State (director of recruiting)

Head coaching record
- Overall: 147–209 (.413)
- Tournaments: 0–1 (Vegas 16)

Accomplishments and honors

Championships
- MAC West Division (2020)

Mark Allen Montgomery (born April 1, 1970) is an American college basketball head coach for the Detroit Mercy Titans. He previously was the head men's basketball coach at Northern Illinois University. Montgomery replaced Ricardo Patton as head coach of the Huskies on March 24, 2011. Prior to being named the head coach at NIU, he was an assistant to head coach Tom Izzo at Michigan State for 10 seasons, the last four as associate head coach. The Spartans reached the NCAA tournament in each of Montgomery's 10 seasons on the staff, including three Final Four appearances and a trip to the title game in 2009.

== Playing career ==
Montgomery was a four-year letter winner at Michigan State from 1988 to 1992 where he also served as captain. Upon completion of his college career, he held the school record for games played at Michigan State (126). He was an All-Big Ten Third Team selection in 1992. He ranks fourth all time in assists and fourth all time in steals for MSU. He averaged 5.3 points and 4.5 assists per game and was a member of the 1990 Big Ten Championship team. He played with current WMU head coach, Dwayne Stephens.

Upon finishing his college career, he played four years of professional basketball in Europe and averaged more than 25 points per game.

== Coaching career ==
=== Assistant at Central Michigan ===
Montgomery spent four years as an assistant coach at Central Michigan, joining the staff in 1997 under head coach Jay Smith. He was a part of their MAC conference championship team in 2001.

=== Assistant at Michigan State ===
Montgomery returned to MSU prior to the 2001–02 season. In 2007, he was promoted to associate head coach under Tom Izzo. He helped MSU to three Final Fours, 2005, 2009, and 2010 including the National Championship game in 2009. He coached for MSU for 10 seasons before being hired as a head coach.

=== Head coach at Northern Illinois ===
On March 24, 2011, Montgomery was introduced as the 27th head coach in NIU history. Montgomery took over a program that had traditionally struggled, going 35–83 in the prior four seasons. Montgomery was fired on January 3, 2021 after a 1–7 start to the 2020–21 season.

=== Back to Michigan State ===
On June 7, 2021, Montgomery was named the recruiting coordinator for his alma mater, Michigan State, returning to work under Tom Izzo.

== Head coaching record ==
Record table
| Season | Team | Overall | Conference | Standing | Postseason |
|---|---|---|---|---|---|
Northern Illinois Huskies (MAC) (2011–2021)
| 2011–12 | Northern Illinois | 5–26 | 3–13 | 6th (West) | |
| 2012–13 | Northern Illinois | 5–25 | 3–13 | 6th (West) | |
| 2013–14 | Northern Illinois | 15–17 | 8–10 | 4th (West) | |
| 2014–15 | Northern Illinois | 14–16 | 8–10 | T–4th (West) | |
| 2015–16 | Northern Illinois | 21–13 | 9–9 | T–3rd (West) | Vegas 16 Quarterfinals |
| 2016–17 | Northern Illinois | 15–17 | 7–11 | T–4th (West) | |
| 2017–18 | Northern Illinois | 13–19 | 6–12 | 6th (West) | |
| 2018–19 | Northern Illinois | 17–17 | 8–10 | 4th (West) | |
| 2019–20 | Northern Illinois | 18–13 | 11–7 | T–1st (West) | |
| 2020–21 | Northern Illinois | 1–7 (Note: Montgomery was fired mid-season on January 3, 2021.) | 0–3 | | |
| Northern Illinois: | | 124–170 (.422) | 63–98 (.391) | | |
Detroit Mercy Titans (Horizon League) (2024–present)
| 2024–25 | Detroit Mercy | 8–24 | 4–16 | 10th | |
| 2025–26 | Detroit Mercy | 17–15 | 12–8 | T–3rd | |
| 2026–27 | Detroit Mercy | 0–0 | 0–0 | | |
| Detroit Mercy: | | 25–39 (.391) | 16–24 (.400) | | |
| Total: | | 147–209 (.413) | | | |
National champion Postseason invitational champion Conference regular season champion Conference regular season and conference tournament champion Division regular season champion Division regular season and conference tournament champion Conference tournament champion
