= DeSean Goode =

American college basketball player

No. 0 – Miami Hurricanes
- Position: Power forward
- Conference: Atlantic Coast Conference

Personal information
- Listed height: 6 ft 8 in (2.03 m)
- Listed weight: 232 lb (105 kg)

Career information
- High school: Fork Union Military Academy (Fork Union, Virginia)
- College: IU Indy (2024–2025); Robert Morris (2025–2026); Miami (Florida) (2026–present)

Career highlights
- Horizon League Player of the Year (2026); First-team All-Horizon League (2026); Horizon League All-Freshman Team (2025)

DeSean Goode is an American college basketball player for the Miami Hurricanes of the Atlantic Coast Conference (ACC). He previously played for the IU Indy Jaguars and Robert Morris Colonials.

== High school career ==
Goode attended Fairmont Senior High School before spending a postgraduate prep year at Fork Union Military Academy in Fork Union, Virginia. During his prep season at Fork Union, he averaged 13 points and 8.2 rebounds per game, before committing to play college basketball at Indiana University Indianapolis.

== College career ==
As a freshman, Goode averaged 7.8 points and 6.0 rebounds, being named to the Horizon League All-Freshman Team. Following the season, he transferred to Robert Morris University. Goode made an instant impact for the Colonials in his first season with the team, being named the Horizon League Player of the Week after scoring 24 points in a victory over Youngstown State on February 7, 2026. At the conclusion of the season, he was named the Horizon League Player of the Year. Goode averaged 15.2 points, 8.7 rebounds and 1.4 assists per game. He transferred to Miami after the season.

== Career statistics ==
Legend
GP	Games played	GS	Games started	MPG	Minutes per game
FG%	Field goal percentage	3P%	3-point field goal percentage	FT%	Free throw percentage
RPG	Rebounds per game	APG	Assists per game	SPG	Steals per game
BPG	Blocks per game	PPG	Points per game	**Bold**	Career high

=== College ===
Year	Team	GP	GS	MPG	FG%	3P%	FT%	RPG	APG	SPG	BPG	PPG
2024–25	IU Indy	30	20	23.1	.506	.360	.693	6.0	1.1	.5	.4	7.8
2025–26	Robert Morris	33	32	30.9	.629	.571	.763	8.7	1.4	.8	.5	15.2
