= Rob Summers (basketball) =

American basketball coach (born 1984)

Current position
- Title: Head coach
- Team: Cleveland State
- Conference: Horizon
- Record: 14–24 (.368)

Biographical details
- Born: June 6, 1984 (age 42)

Playing career
- 2002–2004: Penn State
- 2005–2007: West Virginia

Coaching career (HC unless noted)
- 2011–2013: Glenville State (associate HC)
- 2014–2017: Urbana
- 2017–2019: James Madison (assistant)
- 2019–2022: Cleveland State (assistant)
- 2022–2024: Miami (OH) (associate HC)
- 2024–2025: Missouri (assistant)
- 2025–present: Cleveland State

Administrative career (AD unless noted)
- 2013–2014: James Madison (DBO)

Head coaching record
- Overall: 34–90 (.274)

Rob Summers (born June 6, 1984) is an American basketball coach and former player. He is currently the head coach of the Cleveland State Vikings men's basketball team.

== Career ==
Summers played college basketball at Penn State and West Virginia. He played professionally overseas before beginning his coaching career. His first coaching job was as an associate head coach at Glenville State, before serving as the director of basketball operations for a season at James Madison. In 2014, Summers was named the head coach at Urbana. After three seasons serving as Urbana's head coach, he returned to James Madison as an assistant coach. Summers served as an assistant coach for two seasons at James Madison and three seasons at Cleveland State, before becoming the associate head coach for Miami. He spent two seasons at Miami before leaving for an assistant role at Missouri.

On April 9, 2025, Summers was named the next head coach at Cleveland State, replacing Daniyal Robinson.

== Head coaching record ==
Record table
Season	Team	Overall	Conference	Standing	Postseason
Urbana Blue Knights (MEC) (2014–2017)
2014–15	Urbana	6–23	3–19	11th	
2015–16	Urbana	2–26	1–21	12th	
2016–17	Urbana	12–17	7–15	T–9th	
Urbana:		20–66 (.233)	11–55 (.167)		
Cleveland State Vikings (Horizon) (2025–present)
2025–26	Cleveland State	11–22	6–14	10th	
2026–27	Cleveland State	3–2	0–0		
Cleveland State:		14–24 (.368)	6–14 (.300)		
Total:		34–90 (.274)			
National champion Postseason invitational champion Conference regular season champion Conference regular season and conference tournament champion Division regular season champion Division regular season and conference tournament champion Conference tournament champion
