= Ben Howlett (basketball) =

American basketball coach

Current position
- Title: Head coach
- Team: IU Indy
- Conference: Horizon League
- Record: 7–25 (.219)

Playing career
- 2005–2009: West Liberty

Coaching career (HC unless noted)
- 2009–2010: West Liberty (student assistant)
- 2010–2011: Ohio Valley (assistant)
- 2011–2017: West Liberty (assistant)
- 2017–2025: West Liberty
- 2025–present: IU Indy

Head coaching record
- Overall: 224–62 (.783)
- Tournaments: 17–7 (NCAA Division II)

Accomplishments and honors

Championships
- 7 MEC (2018–2020, 2022–2025); MEC North Division (2021); 3 MEC tournament (2020, 2022, 2023)

Awards
- 3 MEC Coach of the Year (2018, 2022, 2025)

Ben Howlett is an American college basketball coach who is the current head coach of the IU Indy Jaguars. He was formerly the coach of the West Liberty Hilltoppers men's basketball team.

== Early life and playing career ==
Howlett grew up in Marietta, Ohio and attended Marietta High School. He played college basketball for the West Liberty Hilltoppers and averaged 23 points per game as a senior. Howlett scored 1,663 points during his college career.

== Coaching career ==
Howlett began his coaching career as a student assistant for West Liberty following his senior season in 2009. He spent the 2010–2011 season as an assistant for the Ohio Valley University Fighting Scots. Howlett returned to West Liberty as an assistant the following season after being offered a position from his former coach, Jim Crutchfield.

Howlett was hired as the head coach at West Liberty on March 28, 2017, after Crutchfield resigned to take the head coaching position at Nova Southeastern. Howlett won the Mountain East Conference regular season championship in each of his eight seasons as head coach of the Hilltoppers and compiled a record of 217-37.

Howlett was hired as the head coach of IU Indy on May 27, 2025.

== Head coaching record ==
Statistics overview
Season	Team	Overall	Conference	Standing	Postseason
West Liberty (Mountain East Conference) (2017–2025)
2017–18	West Liberty	26–4	20–2	1st	NCAA Division II First Round
2018–19	West Liberty	28–5	20–2	1st	NCAA Division II Sweet 16
2019–20	West Liberty	27–4	19–3	1st	No postseason held
2020–21	West Liberty	18–5	13–3		NCAA Division II Elite Eight
2021–22	West Liberty	29–3	20–2	1st	NCAA Division II First Round
2022–23	West Liberty	33–4	20–2	1st	NCAA Division II Runner-up
2023–24	West Liberty	26–7	17–3	T-1st	NCAA Division II Second Round
2024–25	West Liberty	30–5	18–2	1st	NCAA Division II Elite Eight
West Liberty:		217–37 (.854)	147–19 (.886)		
IU Indy Jaguars (Horizon League) (2025–present)
2025–26	IU Indy	7–25	3–17	11th	
IU Indy:		7–25 (.219)	3–17 (.150)		
Total:		224–62 (.783)			
National champion Postseason invitational champion Conference regular season champion Conference regular season and conference tournament champion Division regular season champion Division regular season and conference tournament champion Conference tournament champion
