= 2025–26 Toledo Rockets men's basketball team =

American college basketball season

2025–26 Toledo Rockets men's basketball
- Conference: Mid-American Conference
- Record: 19–15 (11–7 MAC)
- Head coach: Tod Kowalczyk (16th season)
- Associate head coach: Jeff Massey (12th season); Justin Ingram (8th season)
- Assistant coaches: Jordan Lauf (4th season); Brandon Pritzl (2nd season)
- Home arena: Savage Arena

2025–26 Mid-American Conference men's basketball standings
	Conf.				Overall
Team	W		L	PCT	W		L	PCT
Miami (OH)	18	–	0	1.000	32	–	2	.941
Akron †	17	–	1	.944	29	–	6	.829
Kent State	14	–	4	.778	24	–	10	.706
Toledo	11	–	7	.611	19	–	15	.559
Bowling Green	9	–	9	.500	18	–	14	.563
Ohio	9	–	9	.500	15	–	17	.469
Buffalo	7	–	11	.389	17	–	15	.531
UMass	7	–	11	.389	17	–	16	.515
Ball State	7	–	11	.389	12	–	19	.387
Central Michigan	6	–	12	.333	10	–	21	.323
Western Michigan	4	–	14	.222	10	–	21	.323
Northern Illinois	4	–	14	.222	9	–	21	.300
Eastern Michigan	4	–	14	.222	10	–	21	.323
† 2026 MAC tournament winner

The 2025–26 Toledo Rockets men's basketball team represented the University of Toledo during the 2025–26 NCAA Division I men's basketball season. The Rockets, led by 16th-year head coach Tod Kowalczyk, played their home games at Savage Arena in Toledo, Ohio, as members of the Mid-American Conference.

They finished the 2025–26 season 19–15, 11–7 in MAC play, to finish in 4th place. They qualified for the MAC tournament as the 4th seed, where they defeated Bowling Green and UMass before losing to Akron in the finals.

== Previous season ==
The Rockets finished the 2024–25 season 18–15, 10–8 in MAC play, to finish in a tie for fourth place. They defeated Ohio, before falling to top-seeded and eventual tournament champions Akron in the semifinals of the MAC tournament.

== Offseason ==
=== Departures ===
Departures
Name	Number	Pos.	Height	Weight	Year	Hometown	Reason for departure
Javan Simmons	1	F	6'7"	235	Sophomore	Gahanna, Ohio	Transferred to Ohio
Bryce Ford	2	G	6'3"	190	Sophomore	Scottsdale, Arizona	Transferred to Arizona State
Xavier Thomas	4	F	6'5"	240	Sophomore	Detroit, Michigan	Transferred to Saginaw Valley State
Jaylen Murphy	6	G	6'3"	175	Freshman	Holland, Ohio	Transferred to Bryant & Stratton
Isaiah Adams	7	G	6'7"	225	Fifth year	Jacksonville, Florida	Graduated
Ka'leel Stillman	10	C	6'10"	220	Freshman	Orlando, Florida	Entered the transfer portal
Sam Lewis	11	G	6'6"	210	Sophomore	Chicago, Illinois	Transferred to Virginia
Seth Hubbard	12	G	6'4"	195	Junior	Jonesboro, Georgia	Transferred to Milwaukee
André Lorentsson	13	F	6'9"	225	Senior	Gothenburg, Sweden	Graduated
Colin O'Rourke	20	F	6'8"	225	Graduate student	Plainfield, Illinois	Graduated
Grgur Brcic	24	F	6'10"	235	Sophomore	Zagreb, Croatia	Transferred to Bucknell

=== Incoming transfers ===
Incoming transfers
Name	Number	Pos.	Height	Weight	Year	Hometown	Previous school
Kyler Vanderjagt	4	G	6'4"	220	Senior	Grand Rapids, Michigan	Central Michigan
Mynor Strong	5	G	6'3"	175	Junior	Omaha, Nebraska	Dodge City Community College
Sean Craig	7	F	6'7"	220	Senior	Sylvania, Ohio	IU Indy
Chris Riddle	10	F	6'5"	210	Sophomore	Chicago, Illinois	DePaul
Austin Parks	25	C	6'10"	250	Junior	St. Marys, Ohio	Ohio State

=== 2025 recruiting class ===
College recruiting
Name	Hometown	School	Height	Weight	Commit date
Toby Nwokolo; PF	Reynoldsburg, Ohio	Reynoldsburg High School	6 ft 6 in (1.98 m)	210 lb (95 kg)	Jun 26, 2024
Toby Nwokolo; PF	Recruit ratings: 247Sports: (NR)				
Leroy Blyden Jr. PG	Detroit, Michigan	University of Detroit Jesuit High School	5 ft 9 in (1.75 m)	160 lb (73 kg)	Nov 13, 2024
Leroy Blyden Jr. PG	Recruit ratings: 247Sports: (NR)				
Will James; CG	Holly Springs, North Carolina	Holly Springs High School	6 ft 3 in (1.91 m)	180 lb (82 kg)	Aug 31, 2024
Will James; CG	Recruit ratings: 247Sports: (NR)				
London Praytor; PF	Colorado Springs, Colorado	Liberty High School	6 ft 10 in (2.08 m)	230 lb (100 kg)	Sep 30, 2024
London Praytor; PF	Recruit ratings: ESPN: (NR)				
Phoenix Glassnor; PG	Warren, Michigan	De La Salle Collegiate High School	5 ft 11 in (1.80 m)	175 lb (79 kg)	Jun 24, 2024
Phoenix Glassnor; PG	Recruit ratings: ESPN: (NR)				
Overall recruit ranking:
Note: In many cases, Scout, Rivals, 247Sports, On3, and ESPN may conflict in their listings of height and weight.; In these cases, the average was taken. ESPN grades are on a 100-point scale.; Sources: "2025 Team Ranking". Rivals.

== Preseason ==
On October 21, 2025, the MAC released their preseason poll. Toledo was picked to finish sixth in the conference.

=== Preseason rankings ===
MAC Preseason Poll
Place	Team	Votes
1	Akron	143 (11)
2	Miami (OH)	133 (2)
3	Kent State	122
4	Ohio	108
5	UMass	98
6	Toledo	95
7	Bowling Green	73
8	Ball State	62
9	Eastern Michigan	52
10	Western Michigan	46
11	Buffalo	37
12	Central Michigan	31
13	Northern Illinois	14
(#) first-place votes

=== Preseason All-MAC Teams ===
Preseason All-MAC Teams
Team	Player	Year	Position
Second	Sonny Wilson	Junior	Guard

== Roster ==
2025–26 Toledo Rockets men's basketball team
Players
Coaches

Pos.	#	Name	Height	Weight	Year	Previous school	Hometown
F	0	Toby Nwokolo	6 ft 6 in (1.98 m)	200 lb (91 kg)	Fr	Reynoldsburg High School	Columbus, Ohio
G	2	Leroy Blyden Jr.	6 ft 1 in (1.85 m)	170 lb (77 kg)	Fr	Detroit Jesuit High School	Detroit, Michigan
G	3	Sonny Wilson	6 ft 1 in (1.85 m)	175 lb (79 kg)	Jr	Detroit Jesuit High School	Pontiac, Michigan
G	4	Kyler Vanderjagt	6 ft 4 in (1.93 m)	220 lb (100 kg)	Sr	Central Michigan	Grand Rapids, Michigan
G	5	Mynor Strong	6 ft 3 in (1.91 m)	175 lb (79 kg)	So	Dodge City Community College	Omaha, Nebraska
F	7	Sean Craig	6 ft 7 in (2.01 m)	220 lb (100 kg)	Sr	IU Indy	Sylvania, Ohio
F	10	Chris Riddle	6 ft 5 in (1.96 m)	210 lb (95 kg)	So	DePaul	Chicago, Illinois
G	11	Will James Jr.	6 ft 4 in (1.93 m)	205 lb (93 kg)	Fr	Holly Springs High School	Holly Springs, North Carolina
F	21	London Praytor	7 ft 0 in (2.13 m)	205 lb (93 kg)	Fr	Liberty High School	Colorado Springs, Colorado
G	22	Tyler Ode	6 ft 5 in (1.96 m)	200 lb (91 kg)	So	Saginaw Heritage High School	Saginaw, Michigan
G	23	Phoenix Glassnor	6 ft 0 in (1.83 m)	175 lb (79 kg)	Fr	Warren De La Salle High School	Port Huron, Michigan
C	25	Austin Parks	6 ft 10 in (2.08 m)	250 lb (113 kg)	Jr	Ohio State	St. Marys, Ohio
F	32	Jaylan Ouwinga	6 ft 9 in (2.06 m)	215 lb (98 kg)	So	Grand Rapids Christian High School	Grand Rapids, Michigan

Head coach

- Tod Kowalczyk (Minnesota Duluth)

Assistant coach(es)

- Jeff Massey (Xavier)
- Justin Ingram (Toledo)
- Jordan Lauf (Toledo)
- Brandon Pritzl (Hillsdale)

Legend

- (C) Team captain
- (S) Suspended
- (I) Ineligible
- (W) Walk-on
- Injured
- Current redshirt

Roster
Last update: December 18, 2025

== Schedule and results ==
Date time, TV	Rank^{#}	Opponent^{#}	Result	Record	High points	High rebounds	High assists	Site (attendance) city, state
Exhibition
October 19, 2025*; 3:00 p.m.		at Findlay	W 123–103	–	18 – Ouwinga	11 – Ouwinga	–	Croy Gymnasium; Findlay, OH
Regular season
November 3, 2025*; 7:00 p.m., ESPN+		South Alabama; MAC-SBC Challenge	L 74–76	0–1	17 – Tied	9 – Craig	9 – Blyden Jr.	Savage Arena (3,626); Toledo, OH
November 8, 2025*; 2:00 p.m., ESPN+		Marshall	L 73–85	0–2	16 – Tied	7 – Craig	4 – Tied	Savage Arena (4,026); Toledo, OH
November 11, 2025*; 7:00 p.m., ESPN+		at Wright State	W 81–71	1–2	21 – Craig	9 – Craig	4 – Tied	Nutter Center (3,182); Fairborn, OH
November 15, 2025*; 1:00 p.m., ESPN+		Detroit Mercy	W 90−83	2−2	20 – Blyden Jr.	7 – Parks	7 – Blyden Jr.	Savage Arena (3,797); Toledo, OH
November 19, 2025*; 7:00 p.m., ESPN+		Youngstown State	W 92−75	3−2	18 – Tied	12 – Craig	5 – Tied	Savage Arena (3,741); Toledo, OH
November 24, 2025*; 11:00 a.m., FloCollege		vs. Troy; Coconut Hoops Royal Palm Division semifinals	W 75–68	4–2	23 – Wilson	11 – Craig	4 – Blyden Jr.	Alico Arena (212); Fort Myers, FL
November 26, 2025*; 1:30 p.m., FloCollege		vs. Belmont; Coconut Hoops Royal Palm Division championship	L 72–87	4–3	17 – Craig	5 – Parks	5 – Blyden Jr.	Alico Arena (289); Fort Myers, FL
December 1, 2025*; 6:30 p.m., ESPN+		Central State	W 102–58	5–3	27 – Parks	12 – Praytor	6 – Tied	Savage Arena (3,776); Toledo, OH
December 6, 2025*; 3:00 p.m., ESPN+		at Oakland	L 97–98	5–4	20 – Blyden Jr.	10 – Craig	7 – Wilson	OU Credit Union O'rena (2,023); Auburn Hills, MI
December 13, 2025*; 1:00 p.m., ESPN+		at Robert Morris	L 70–75	5–5	21 – Wilson	8 – Parks	2 – Blyden Jr.	UPMC Events Center (996); Moon Township, PA
December 16, 2025*; 6:30 p.m., Peacock		at No. 9 Michigan State	L 69−92	5−6	29 – Wilson	9 – Parks	5 – Wilson	Breslin Center (14,797); East Lansing, MI
December 20, 2025*; 12:00 p.m., ESPN+		Lourdes	W 100–67	6–6	20 – Blyden Jr.	11 – Craig	8 – Wilson	Savage Arena (3,963); Toledo, OH
December 30, 2025; 6:30 p.m., ESPN+		Western Michigan	W 84–79	7–6 (1–0)	36 – Blyden Jr.	13 – Craig	6 – Wilson	Savage Arena (4,232); Toledo, OH
January 3, 2026; 3:00 p.m., ESPN+		at Central Michigan	W 78–75	8–6 (2–0)	23 – Vanderjagt	11 – Parks	5 – Tied	McGuirk Arena (1,342); Mount Pleasant, MI
January 6, 2026; 8:00 p.m., ESPN+		at Northern Illinois	W 75–61	9–6 (3–0)	18 – Vanderjagt	5 – Tied	5 – Tied	Convocation Center (864); DeKalb, IL
January 9, 2026; 6:00 p.m., CBSSN		Miami (OH)	L 73–87	9–7 (3–1)	20 – Wilson	13 – Craig	5 – Wilson	Savage Arena (5,143); Toledo, OH
January 13, 2026; 7:00 p.m., ESPN+		Ohio	W 101–85	10–7 (4–1)	25 – Wilson	10 – Craig	5 – Tied	Savage Arena (4,552); Toledo, OH
January 16, 2026; 6:30 p.m., CBSSN		at Kent State	L 84–87	10–8 (4–2)	19 – Blyden Jr.	6 – Tied	6 – Wilson	MAC Center (2,433); Kent, OH
January 20, 2026; 6:00 p.m., ESPN+		at UMass	L 82–84	10–9 (4–3)	22 – Blyden Jr.	5 – Tied	7 – Wilson	Mullins Center (2,507); Amherst, MA
January 24, 2026; 5:00 p.m., ESPN+		Bowling Green	W 73–72	11–9 (5–3)	19 – Blyden Jr.	7 – Craig	5 – Blyden Jr.	Savage Arena (6,850); Toledo, OH
January 27, 2026; 7:00 p.m., ESPN+		at Akron	L 81–91	11–10 (5–4)	22 – Wilson	9 – Craig	8 – Wilson	James A. Rhodes Arena (2,100); Akron, OH
January 31, 2026; 12:00 p.m., ESPN+		Ball State	W 73–55	12–10 (6–4)	19 – Wilson	9 – Ouwinga	7 – Wilson	Savage Arena (4,076); Toledo, OH
February 3, 2026; 7:00 p.m., ESPN+		Kent State	L 72–75	12–11 (6–5)	17 – Parks	8 – Parks	5 – Wilson	Savage Arena (4,165); Toledo, OH
February 7, 2026*; 4:00 p.m., ESPN+		at James Madison; MAC-SBC Challenge	L 71–73	12–12	24 – Blyden Jr.	5 – Craig	5 – Blyden Jr.	Atlantic Union Bank Center (3,417); Harrisonburg, VA
February 11, 2026; 7:00 p.m., ESPN+		at Western Michigan	W 90–79	13–12 (7–5)	18 – Wilson	8 – Craig	4 – Parks	University Arena (1,522); Kalamazoo, MI
February 14, 2026; 5:00 p.m., ESPN+		at Bowling Green	L 70–80	13–13 (7–6)	20 – Wilson	9 – Parks	5 – Blyden Jr.	Stroh Center (4,167); Bowling Green, OH
February 21, 2026; 5:00 p.m., ESPN+		Eastern Michigan	W 94–75	14–13 (8–6)	15 – Tied	6 – Tied	8 – Blyden Jr.	Savage Arena (5,429); Toledo, OH
February 24, 2026; 7:00 p.m., ESPN+		Northern Illinois	W 79–69	15–13 (9–6)	17 – Wilson	7 – Tied	7 – Wilson	Savage Arena (4,531); Toledo, OH
February 28, 2026; 4:00 p.m., ESPN+		at Ohio	W 79–67	16–13 (10–6)	22 – Blyden Jr.	11 – Parks	3 – Blyden Jr.	Convocation Center (6,404); Athens, OH
March 3, 2026; 7:00 p.m., ESPN+		at No. 19 Miami (OH)	L 72–74	16–14 (10–7)	21 – Blyden Jr.	7 – Ouwinga	6 – Wilson	Millett Hall (10,640); Oxford, OH
March 6, 2026; 7:00 p.m., ESPN+		Buffalo	W 99–78	17–14 (11–7)	24 – Wilson	7 – Blyden Jr.	13 – Blyden Jr.	Savage Arena (4,539); Toledo, OH
MAC tournament
March 12, 2026; 1:30 p.m., ESPN+	(4)	vs. (5) Bowling Green; Quarterfinals	W 77–76	18–14	23 – Blyden Jr.	7 – Wilson	3 – Tied	Rocket Arena (9,123); Cleveland, OH
March 13, 2026; 5:00 p.m., CBSSN	(4)	vs. (8) UMass; Semifinals	W 77–67	19–14	18 – Wilson	11 – Craig	7 – Blyden Jr.	Rocket Arena (10,936); Cleveland, OH
March 14, 2026; 8:00 p.m., ESPN2	(4)	vs. (2) Akron; Championship	L 76–79	19–15	21 – Blyden Jr.	7 – Parks	8 – Wilson	Rocket Arena (11,072); Cleveland, OH
*Non-conference game. ^{#}Rankings from AP Poll. (#) Tournament seedings in parentheses. All times are in Eastern.
