= 2025–26 Milwaukee Panthers men's basketball team =

American college basketball season

2025–26 Milwaukee Panthers men's basketball
- Conference: Horizon League
- Record: 12–20 (8–12 Horizon)
- Head coach: Bart Lundy (4th season)
- Assistant coaches: Jake Williams; Ben Walker; Jose Winston
- Home arena: UW–Milwaukee Panther Arena; Klotsche Center

2025–26 Horizon League men's basketball standings
	Conf.				Overall
Team	W		L	PCT	W		L	PCT
Wright State †	15	–	5	.750	23	–	12	.657
Robert Morris	13	–	7	.650	22	–	11	.667
Detroit Mercy	12	–	8	.600	17	–	15	.531
Oakland	12	–	8	.600	16	–	16	.500
Green Bay	12	–	8	.600	18	–	15	.545
Purdue Fort Wayne	11	–	9	.550	17	–	15	.531
Northern Kentucky	10	–	10	.500	20	–	14	.588
Milwaukee	8	–	12	.400	12	–	20	.375
Youngstown State	8	–	12	.400	15	–	17	.469
Cleveland State	6	–	14	.300	11	–	22	.333
IU Indy	3	–	17	.150	7	–	25	.219
† 2026 Horizon League tournament winner

The 2025–26 Milwaukee Panthers men's basketball team represented the University of Wisconsin–Milwaukee during the 2025–26 NCAA Division I men's basketball season. The Panthers, led by fourth-year head coach Bart Lundy, played their home games at the UW–Milwaukee Panther Arena in Milwaukee, Wisconsin, and select games at the on-campus Klotsche Center as members of the Horizon League.

== Previous season ==
The Panthers finished the 2024–25 season tied for second place in the Horizon League with a record of 21–11, including 14–6 in conference play. The team reached its highest rank in the NCAA Evaluation Tool (NET) rankings at 107. In the quarterfinals of the Horizon League tournament, they were upset by sixth-seeded Oakland, 72–64.

== Offseason ==
=== Departures ===
Milwaukee departures
Name	No.	Pos.	Ht.	Wt.	Year	Hometown	Reason for departure
Themus Fulks	1	G	6'2"	185	RS Senior	Winston-Salem, NC	Transferred to UCF
Jamichael Stillwell	3	F	6'8"	225	Junior	Atlanta, GA	Transferred to UCF
Kentrell Pullian	4	G	6'0"	182	Senior	Benton Harbor, MI	Graduated
A.J. McKee	5	G	6'2"	205	RS Senior	Charlotte, NC	Graduated; Signed with NTD Baku
Vinko Polovic	7	F	6'7"	205	RS Sophomore	Milwaukee, WI	Transferred to Lewis
Erik Pratt	8	G	6'5"	185	RS Senior	Lake Worth, FL	Transferred to Stony Brook
Learic Davis	11	G	6'7"	190	RS Sophomore	Milwaukee, WI	Transferred to USC Upstate
T.J. Cusciotta	13	G	6'4"	198	Freshman	White Bear Lake, MN	Left program
Maurice Thomas	20	G	6'0"	175	RS Freshman	Chicago, IL	Transferred to Trinidad State
Darius Duffy	34	F	6'8"	225	Senior	Murray, KY	Transferred to Purdue Fort Wayne

=== Incoming transfers ===
Milwaukee incoming transfers
Name	No.	Pos.	Ht.	Wt.	Year	Hometown	Previous school
Amar Augillard	1	G	6'5"	225	RS Senior	Zion, IL	Fresno State
Isaiah Dorceus	5	G	6'0"	180	Junior	Orlando, FL	Daytona State
Chandler Jackson	11	F	6'7"	225	RS Junior	Indianapolis, IN	Parkland
Seth Hubbard	12	G	6'4"	195	Senior	Jonesboro, GA	Toledo
Sekou Konneh	25	F	6'9"	215	RS Freshman	Milwaukee, WI	DePaul
Tate Mackenzie	34	F	6'10"	260	Junior	Ypsilanti, MI	Howard College

=== 2025 recruiting class ===
College recruiting information
Name	Hometown	School	Height	Weight	Commit date
Josh Dixon; G	Alpharetta, GA	Milton High School (GA)	6 ft 0 in (1.83 m)	155 lb (70 kg)	Sep 26, 2024
Josh Dixon; G	Recruit ratings: 247Sports: ESPN: (81)				
Stevie Elam; G	Adrian, MI	Adrian High School (MI)	6 ft 2 in (1.88 m)	185 lb (84 kg)	Sep 17, 2024
Stevie Elam; G	Recruit ratings: 247Sports:				
Ned Renfree; G	Ballarat, Australia	Ballarat Miners	6 ft 2 in (1.88 m)	193 lb (88 kg)	Oct 15, 2024
Ned Renfree; G	Recruit ratings: No ratings found				
Overall recruit ranking:
Note: In many cases, Scout, Rivals, 247Sports, On3, and ESPN may conflict in their listings of height and weight.; In these cases, the average was taken. ESPN grades are on a 100-point scale.; Sources: "2025 Team Ranking". Rivals.

== Preseason ==
On October 8, 2025, the Horizon League released their preseason poll. Milwaukee was picked to finish first in the conference, while receiving 24 first-place votes. One player was named to the preseason All-Horizon League First Team, and two players were named to the Second Team.

=== Preseason rankings ===
Horizon League Preseason Coaches Poll
Rank	Team	Points
1	Milwaukee	428 (24)
2	Oakland	384 (7)
3	Youngstown State	364 (2)
4	Robert Morris	345 (8)
5	Purdue Fort Wayne	287 (1)
6	Northern Kentucky	274
7	Wright State	221
8	Cleveland State	217 (2)
9	Detroit Mercy	176
10	IU Indy	115
11	Green Bay	93
(#) first-place votes

=== Preseason All-Horizon League Teams ===
Preseason All-Horizon League Teams
Team	Player	Position	Year
First	Amar Aguillard	Guard	Redshirt Senior
Second	Faizon Fields	Forward	Senior
Second	Seth Hubbard	Guard	Senior

== Roster ==
2025–26 Milwaukee Panthers men's basketball team
Players
Coaches

Pos.	#	Name	Height	Weight	Year	Previous school	Hometown
G	00	John Lovelace Jr. (injured)	6 ft 8 in (2.03 m)	215 lb (98 kg)	Sr	Youngstown State	Milwaukee, WI
G	1	Amar Augillard	6 ft 5 in (1.96 m)	215 lb (98 kg)	RS Sr	Fresno State	Zion, IL
G	2	Josh Dixon	6 ft 1 in (1.85 m)	160 lb (73 kg)	Fr	Milton HS (GA)	Charlotte, NC
F	3	Danilo Jovanovich	6 ft 8 in (2.03 m)	227 lb (103 kg)	Sr	Louisville	Milwaukee, WI
G	5	Isaiah Doreceus	6 ft 0 in (1.83 m)	180 lb (82 kg)	Jr	Daytona State	Orlando, FL
G	8	Stevie Elam	6 ft 3 in (1.91 m)	200 lb (91 kg)	Fr	Adrian HS (MI)	Adrian, MI
F	9	Simeon Murchison (W)	6 ft 9 in (2.06 m)	221 lb (100 kg)	RS So	Milwaukee Hamilton HS	Milwaukee, WI
G	10	Ned Renfree	6 ft 2 in (1.88 m)	193 lb (88 kg)	Fr	St. Patrick's College	Ballarat, Australia
F	11	Chandler Jackson	6 ft 7 in (2.01 m)	225 lb (102 kg)	RS Jr	Parkland	Indianapolis, IN
G	12	Seth Hubbard (injured)	6 ft 4 in (1.93 m)	195 lb (88 kg)	Sr	Toledo	Jonesboro, GA
F	22	Faizon Fields	6 ft 10 in (2.08 m)	220 lb (100 kg)	Sr	Old Dominion	Memphis, TN
G	23	Austin Villareal (W)	6 ft 1 in (1.85 m)	180 lb (82 kg)	So	Arrowhead HS	Pewaukee, WI
G	24	Esyah Pippa-White	6 ft 2 in (1.88 m)	180 lb (82 kg)	Jr	Odessa	Portland, OR
F	25	Sekou Konneh	6 ft 9 in (2.06 m)	215 lb (98 kg)	RS Fr	DePaul	Milwaukee, WI
G	29	Aaron Franklin	6 ft 5 in (1.96 m)	210 lb (95 kg)	RS Sr	Hutchinson CC	Kansas City, MO
F	34	Tate McKenzie	6 ft 10 in (2.08 m)	260 lb (118 kg)	Jr	Howard College	Ypsilanti, MI

Head coach

- Bart Lundy (Lenoir–Rhyne)

Assistant coach(es)

- Jake Williams (Middle Tennessee)
- Ben Walker (Creighton)
- Jose Winston (Milwaukee)

Legend

- (C) Team captain
- (S) Suspended
- (I) Ineligible
- (W) Walk-on
- Injured
- Current redshirt

Roster
Last update: November 4, 2025

== Schedule and results ==
Date time, TV	Rank^{#}	Opponent^{#}	Result	Record	High points	High rebounds	High assists	Site (attendance) city, state
Exhibition
October 25, 2025*; 1:00 p.m.		Parkside	W 97–65	–	19 – Lovelace Jr.	5 – Tied	4 – Tied	Klotsche Center; Milwaukee, WI
Regular season
November 3, 2025*; 7:00 p.m., ESPN+		Hampton	W 90–86	1–0	23 – Hubbard	10 – Jovanovich	6 – Dorceus	UW–Milwaukee Panther Arena (1,744); Milwaukee, WI
November 8, 2025*; 1:00 p.m., ESPN+		at Wofford	L 76–86	1–1	17 – Hubbard	5 – Jovanovich	6 – Dorceus	Jerry Richardson Indoor Stadium (1,342); Spartanburg, SC
November 10, 2025*; 7:00 p.m., ESPN+		Little Rock	W 92–72	2–1	25 – Augillard	5 – Jovanovich	4 – Hubbard	UW–Milwaukee Panther Arena (1,412); Milwaukee, WI
November 12, 2025*; 6:00 p.m., FS1		at Indiana	L 70–101	2–2	18 – Jovanovich	6 – Jovanovich	3 – Tied	Simon Skjodt Assembly Hall (17,222); Bloomington, IN
November 14, 2025*; 7:00 p.m., ESPN+		at No. 11 Texas Tech	L 63–80	2–3	17 – Jovanovich	8 – Konneh	3 – Tied	United Supermarkets Arena (13,126); Lubbock, TX
November 22, 2025*; 6:00 p.m., ESPN+		at Wichita State	L 58–75	2–4	12 – Jovanovich	8 – Fields	5 – Hubbard	Charles Koch Arena (5,941); Wichita, KS
November 25, 2025*; 6:00 p.m., ESPN+		Dominican (IL)	W 125–70	3–4	20 – Augillard	9 – Konneh	8 – Dorceus	Klotsche Center (1,379); Milwaukee, WI
November 29, 2025*; 6:00 p.m., ESPN+		at Akron	L 81–105	3–5	21 – Jovanovich	7 – Elam	5 – Hubbard	James A. Rhodes Arena (1,697); Akron, OH
December 6, 2025; 7:00 p.m., ESPN+		Robert Morris	W 74–72	4–5 (1–0)	21 – Hubbard	7 – Jovanovich	5 – Dorceus	UW–Milwaukee Panther Arena (1,959); Milwaukee, WI
December 14, 2025*; 1:00 p.m., ESPN+		Indiana State	L 68–70	4–6	16 – Tied	9 – Jovanovich	3 – Jovanovich	UW–Milwaukee Panther Arena (1,824); Milwaukee, WI
December 19, 2025*; 4:00 p.m., PTB Live		vs. South Dakota State; Milwaukee Hoops Showdown	W 88–87	5–6	24 – Dixon	8 – Tied	7 – Dorceus	Fiserv Forum (7,328); Milwaukee, WI
December 21, 2025; 4:00 p.m., ESPN+		at Cleveland State	W 81–71	6–6 (2–0)	28 – Dixon	12 – Fields	9 – Dorceus	Wolstein Center (1,214); Cleveland, OH
December 29, 2025; 7:00 p.m., ESPN+		Purdue Fort Wayne	W 77–55	7-6 (3–0)	13 – Franklin	13 – Franklin	7 – Dorceus	UW–Milwaukee Panther Arena (2,068); Milwaukee, WI
December 30, 2025*; 6:00 p.m., BTN		at Wisconsin	L 60–80	7–7	17 – Dixon	8 – Konneh	4 – Dorceus	Kohl Center (15,570); Madison, WI
January 1, 2026; 1:00 p.m., ESPN+		at Wright State	L 70–76	7–8 (3–1)	15 – Jovanovich	10 – Jovanovich	4 – Dixon	Nutter Center (2,827); Dayton, OH
January 5, 2026; 6:00 p.m., ESPN+		at Green Bay	L 76–79	7–9 (3–2)	19 – Jovanovich	7 – Konneh	4 – Dorceus	Kress Events Center (1,864); Green Bay, WI
January 9, 2026; 7:00 p.m., ESPN+		Northern Kentucky	L 67–85	7–10 (3–3)	16 – Elam	7 – Elam	3 – Dorceus	UW–Milwaukee Panther Arena (1,747); Milwaukee, WI
January 11, 2026; 12:00 p.m., ESPN+		IU Indy	W 95–83	8–10 (4–3)	28 – Augillard	14 – Franklin	4 – Tied	UW–Milwaukee Panther Arena (1,402); Milwaukee, WI
January 15, 2026; 6:00 p.m., ESPNU		Oakland	L 60–73	8–11 (4–4)	16 – Konneh	13 – Franklin	6 – Dorceus	UW–Milwaukee Panther Arena (1,643); Milwaukee, WI
January 18, 2026; 1:00 p.m., ESPN+		at Purdue Fort Wayne	L 82–100	8–12 (4–5)	35 – Augillard	11 – Konneh	3 – Pippa-White	Memorial Coliseum (1,021); Fort Wayne, IN
January 22, 2026; 6:00 p.m., ESPN+		at Robert Morris	L 76–88	8–13 (4–6)	16 – Augillard	7 – Tied	5 – Dixon	UPMC Events Center (1,355); Moon Township, PA
January 24, 2026; 1:00 p.m., ESPN+		at Youngstown State	W 65–64	9–13 (5–6)	16 – Augillard	8 – Franklin	3 – Dorceus	Beeghly Center (2,187); Youngstown, OH
January 30, 2026; 7:00 p.m., ESPN+		Wright State	L 69–76	9–14 (5–7)	19 – Augillard	10 – Elam	7 – Dorceus	UW–Milwaukee Panther Arena (3,174); Milwaukee, WI
February 1, 2026; 2:00 p.m., ESPN+		Cleveland State	L 88–90	9–15 (5–8)	21 – Elam	12 – Jackson	9 – Franklin	UW–Milwaukee Panther Arena (2,017); Milwaukee, WI
February 4, 2026; 7:00 p.m., ESPNU/ESPN+		Detroit Mercy	L 63–76	9–16 (5–9)	10 – Tied	7 – Tied	5 – Dorceus	UW–Milwaukee Panther Arena (1,739); Milwaukee, WI
February 7, 2026; 4:00 p.m., ESPN+		at Northern Kentucky	L 62–67	9–17 (5–10)	11 – Jackson	10 – Franklin	4 – Franklin	Truist Arena (2,903); Highland Heights, KY
February 10, 2026; 6:00 p.m., ESPN+		at IU Indy	W 92–88	10–17 (6–10)	25 – Jackson	11 – Franklin	3 – Dorceus	The Jungle (631); Indianapolis, IN
February 15, 2026; 2:00 p.m., ESPN+		Green Bay	W 75–72	11–17 (7–10)	23 – Jackson	7 – Fields	7 – Pippa-White	UW–Milwaukee Panther Arena (4,363); Milwaukee, WI
February 20, 2026; 6:00 p.m., ESPN+		at Detroit Mercy	L 86–91	11–18 (7–11)	22 – Elam	8 – Fields	5 – Dixon	Calihan Hall (1,213); Detroit, MI
February 22, 2026; 2:00 p.m., ESPNU/ESPN+		at Oakland	L 70–81	11–19 (7–12)	25 – Jackson	11 – Konneh	13 – Pippa-White	OU Credit Union O'rena (2,686); Rochester, MI
February 25, 2026; 7:00 p.m., ESPN+		Youngstown State	W 78–65	12–19 (8–12)	19 – Elam	11 – Franklin	4 – Pippa-White	UW–Milwaukee Panther Arena (2,047); Milwaukee, WI
Horizon League tournament
March 4, 2026; 6:00 p.m., ESPN+	(8)	at (3) Detroit Mercy; First round	L 63–84	12–20	13 – Konneh	9 – Konneh	3 – Pippa-White	Calihan Hall (3,131); Detroit, MI
*Non-conference game. ^{#}Rankings from AP Poll. (#) Tournament seedings in parentheses. All times are in Central.
