= Brevin Pritzl =

American basketball player (born 1996)

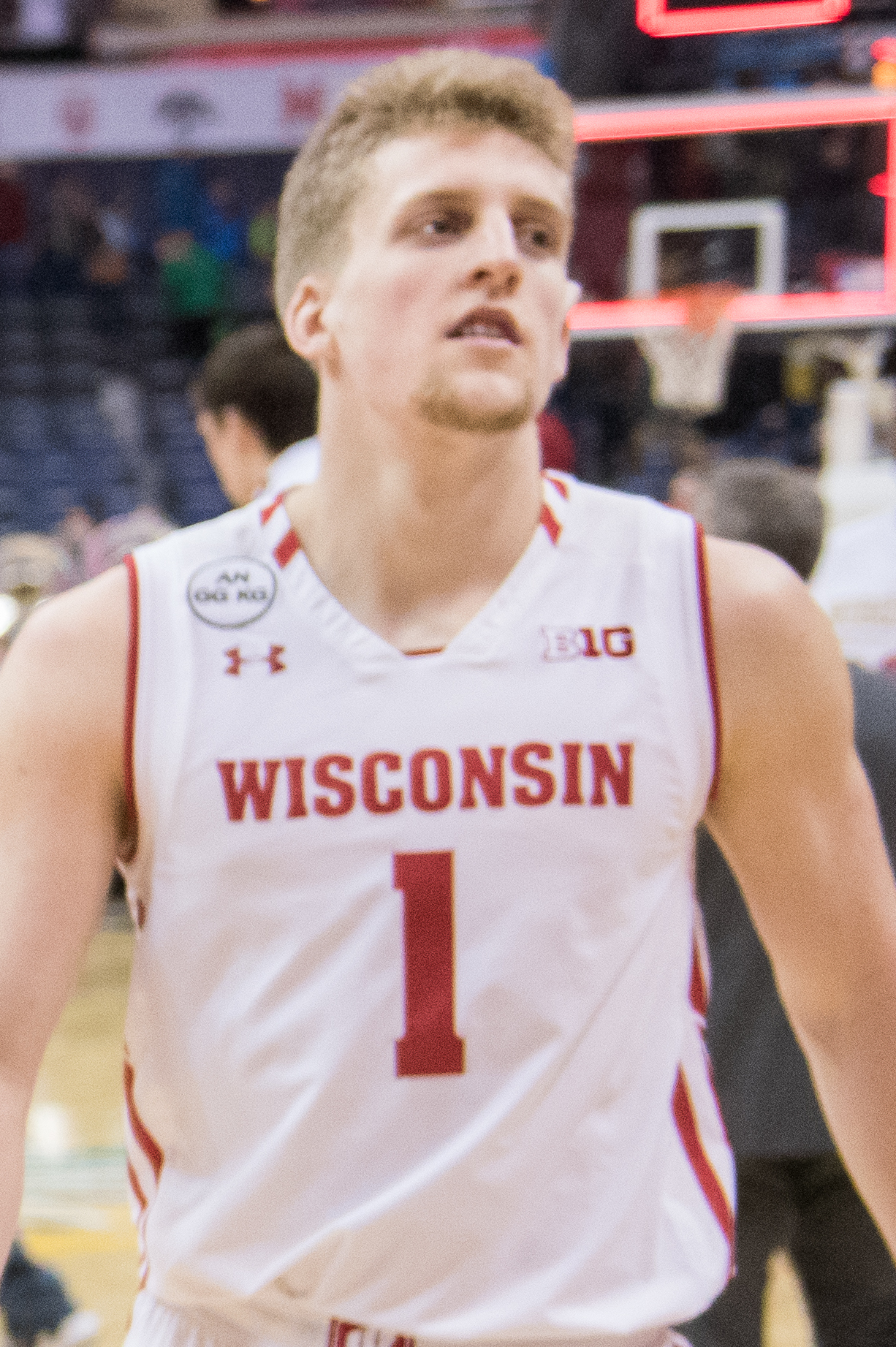
- Pritzl with the Leuven Bears in 2023

Free agent
- Position: Shooting guard

Personal information
- Born: October 9, 1996 (age 29) De Pere, Wisconsin, U.S.
- Listed height: 6 ft 3.5 in (1.92 m)
- Listed weight: 200 lb (91 kg)

Career information
- High school: De Pere (De Pere, Wisconsin)
- College: Wisconsin (2015–2020)
- NBA draft: 2020: undrafted
- Playing career: 2020–present

Career history
- 2020–2021: Tamiš
- 2021–2022: Team FOG Naestved
- 2022-2023: Leuven Bears
- 2023: Crailsheim Merlins
- 2023-2024: Kortrijk Spurs

Brevin Pritzl (born October 10, 1996) is an American basketball player who last played for Kortrijk Spurs in the BNXT League . Pritzl previously played for Leuven Bears in the BNXT League, Tamiš of the Basketball League of Serbia, for Team FOG Naestved in the Danish basketball league, Basketligaen and Crailsheim Merlins of Basketball Bundesliga. Pritzl played college basketball for Wisconsin.

== High school career ==
Pritzl attended De Pere High School in De Pere, Wisconsin. He finished as the leading scorer with 1,720 points.

College recruiting
Name	Hometown	School	Height	Weight	Commit date
Brevin Pritzl; SG	De Pere, Wisconsin	De Pere	6 ft 3 in (1.91 m)	185 lb (84 kg)	May 23, 2014
Brevin Pritzl; SG	Recruit ratings: Scout: Rivals: 247Sports: ESPN:				
Overall recruit ranking: Scout: 48 Rivals: 79
Note: In many cases, Scout, Rivals, 247Sports, On3, and ESPN may conflict in their listings of height and weight.; In these cases, the average was taken. ESPN grades are on a 100-point scale.; Sources: "2014 Team Ranking". Rivals.

== College career ==
Pritzl hardly played as a redshirt freshman. He started 21 games as a redshirt sophomore, averaging 8.9 points and 3.8 rebounds per game. Pritzl averaged 4.8 points and 2.4 rebounds per game as a junior. As a senior, Pritzl averaged 8.0 points and 3.7 rebounds per game, helping Wisconsin finish 14–6 in the Big Ten and 21–10 overall. Pritzl shot 37.0% from behind the arc, third-best on the team behind Micah Potter and D'Mitrik Trice. The team won eight straight games before the season was cancelled due to the coronavirus pandemic.

== College statistics ==
Legend
GP	Games played	GS	Games started	MPG	Minutes per game
FG%	Field goal percentage	3P%	3-point field goal percentage	FT%	Free throw percentage
RPG	Rebounds per game	APG	Assists per game	SPG	Steals per game
BPG	Blocks per game	PPG	Points per game	**Bold**	Career high

Year	Team	GP	GS	MPG	FG%	3P%	FT%	RPG	APG	SPG	BPG	PPG
2015–16	Wisconsin	1	0	4.0	.000	.000	.000	.0	.0	.0	.0	.0
2016–17	Wisconsin	24	0	8.1	.342	.238	.737	1.1	0.1	0.3	0.0	1.9
2017–18	Wisconsin	32	**21**	**29.3**	.397	.356	**.855**	**3.8**	**1.0**	**0.8**	0.2	**8.9**
2018–19	Wisconsin	**34**	0	19.6	**.463**	**.410**	.833	2.4	0.5	0.1	0.3	4.8
2019–20	Wisconsin	31	7	21.7	.389	.370	.850	3.7	0.7	0.2	0.5	8.0
Career		122	28	21.7	.403	.366	.833	2.8	0.6	0.5	0.1	6.1

== Professional career ==
On July 27, 2020, Pritzl has signed with Tamiš of the Basketball League of Serbia. Pritzl scored 42 points in a game on December 26, 2020. In August 2021, Pritzl signed with Team FOG Naestved from Naestved, Denmark to play in the Danish basketball league, Basketligaen April 2022, Pritzl signed with Leuven Bears from Leuven, to play in the Belgium and the Netherlands basketball league, BNXT League June 2023, Pritzl signed with Harko Merlins from Crailsheim, to play in the Basketball Bundesliga (BBL),

=== Eurocup ===
Year	Team	GP	GS	MPG	FG%	3P%	FT%	RPG	APG	SPG	BPG	PPG	PIR
2020–21	Tamiš	30	**29**	28.3	**50.0**	39.6	89.0	2.5	2.0	.6	.1	13.4	11.4
2021–22	Team FOG Naestved	28	28	**31.1**	48.6	**43.5**	**97.4**	**5.3**	**2.0**	**1**	.3	**16.6**	**19.9**
2022–23	Leuven Bears	**31**	14	25.1	46.0	41.3	84.2	2.6	1.4	.9	**.3**	16.5	16.2
2023	Harko Merlins	2	0	10.3	50.0	50.0	100.0	.5	.5	.5	0	2.5	2.5
2023–24	Kortrijk Spurs	22	12	20.5	44.0	37.0	91.8	2.0	1.2	.7	.1	10.5	9.9

== Personal ==
Brevin's father, Brian, played college basketball at St. Norbert and Brevin's older brother, Brandon, played college basketball at Hillsdale College and is the current assistant men's basketball coach for the Toledo Rockets team. Brevin earned a bachelor's degree in kinesiology in December 2018 and master's degree in educational leadership and policy analysis in December 2019.
