= 2025–26 Oakland Golden Grizzlies men's basketball team =

American college basketball season

2025–26 Oakland Golden Grizzlies men's basketball
- Conference: Horizon League
- Record: 16–16 (12–8 Horizon)
- Head coach: Greg Kampe (42nd season)
- Associate head coach: Jeff Smith
- Assistant coaches: Trey McDonald; Bobby Naubert
- Home arena: OU Credit Union O'rena

2025–26 Horizon League men's basketball standings
	Conf.				Overall
Team	W		L	PCT	W		L	PCT
Wright State †	15	–	5	.750	23	–	12	.657
Robert Morris	13	–	7	.650	22	–	11	.667
Detroit Mercy	12	–	8	.600	17	–	15	.531
Oakland	12	–	8	.600	16	–	16	.500
Green Bay	12	–	8	.600	18	–	15	.545
Purdue Fort Wayne	11	–	9	.550	17	–	15	.531
Northern Kentucky	10	–	10	.500	20	–	14	.588
Milwaukee	8	–	12	.400	12	–	20	.375
Youngstown State	8	–	12	.400	15	–	17	.469
Cleveland State	6	–	14	.300	11	–	22	.333
IU Indy	3	–	17	.150	7	–	25	.219
† 2026 Horizon League tournament winner

The 2025–26 Oakland Golden Grizzlies men's basketball team represented Oakland University during the 2025–26 NCAA Division I men's basketball season. The Golden Grizzlies, led by 42nd-year head coach Greg Kampe, played their home games at the OU Credit Union O'rena in Auburn Hills, Michigan as members of the Horizon League.

== Previous season ==
The Golden Grizzlies finished the 2024–25 season 16–18, 11–9 in Horizon League play to finish as Horizon League regular season champions. They defeated Green Bay, Milwaukee in the Horizon League tournament but lost to Robert Morris in overtime during the semifinals.

== Preseason ==
On October 8, 2025, the Horizon League released their preseason poll. Oakland was picked to finish second in the conference, while receiving seven first-place votes. One player was named to the preseason All-Horizon League First Team.

=== Preseason rankings ===
Horizon League Preseason Coaches Poll
Rank	Team	Points
1	Milwaukee	428 (24)
2	Oakland	384 (7)
3	Youngstown State	364 (2)
4	Robert Morris	345 (8)
5	Purdue Fort Wayne	287 (1)
6	Northern Kentucky	274
7	Wright State	221
8	Cleveland State	217 (2)
9	Detroit Mercy	176
10	IU Indy	115
11	Green Bay	93
(#) first-place votes

=== Preseason All-Horizon League Teams ===
Preseason All-Horizon League Teams
Team	Player	Position	Year
First	Tuburu Naivalurua	Forward	Graduate student

== Roster ==
2025–26 Oakland Golden Grizzlies men's basketball team
Players
Coaches

Pos.	#	Name	Height	Weight	Year	Previous school	Hometown
G	0	Nassim Mashhour	6 ft 4 in (1.93 m)	184 lb (83 kg)	So	Dearborn HS	Dearborn, Michigan
G	1	Hamoudy Mashhour	6 ft 2 in (1.88 m)	188 lb (85 kg)	Fr	Dearborn HS	Dearborn, Michigan
G	2	Ziare Wells	6 ft 7 in (2.01 m)	170 lb (77 kg)	Sr	Lenoir–Rhyne	Queens, New York
G	3	Donny Yeager	6 ft 0 in (1.83 m)	173 lb (78 kg)	Fr	Nouvel Catholic Central HS/Golden State Prep	Saginaw, Michigan
G	4	William Kassi	6 ft 9 in (2.06 m)	190 lb (86 kg)	Jr	Indian Hills CC	Pontoise, France
G	5	MJ Yeager	5 ft 10 in (1.78 m)	152 lb (69 kg)	Fr	Nouvel Catholic Central HS/Golden State Prep	Saginaw, Michigan
F	6	Michael Houge	6 ft 7 in (2.01 m)	228 lb (103 kg)	GS	Jacksonville State	Detroit, Michigan
G	10	Brett White II	6 ft 6 in (1.98 m)	184 lb (83 kg)	GS	Rochester Christian	Battle Creek, Michigan
F	11	Nate Deer	6 ft 10 in (2.08 m)	240 lb (109 kg)	Sr	Texas State	Adelaide, Australia
F	12	Tuburu Naivalurua	6 ft 8 in (2.03 m)	240 lb (109 kg)	GS	Garden City CC	Sydney, Australia
G	13	Warren Marshall IV	6 ft 6 in (1.98 m)	180 lb (82 kg)	RS Fr	Brother Rice HS	Auburn Hills, Michigan
G	21	Khoi Thurmon	6 ft 1 in (1.85 m)	205 lb (93 kg)	Jr	Panola College	Chicago, Illinois
F	32	Isaac Garrett	6 ft 8 in (2.03 m)	219 lb (99 kg)	Jr	Snow College	Pleasant Grove, Utah
G	55	Brody Robinson	5 ft 11 in (1.8 m)	160 lb (73 kg)	Sr	UT Arlington	Houston, Texas

Head coach

- Greg Kampe (Bowling Green)

Assistant coach(es)

- Jeff Smith (Southeast Missouri State)
- Trey McDonald (Ohio State)
- Bobby Naubert (Madonna)

Legend

- (C) Team captain
- (S) Suspended
- (I) Ineligible
- (W) Walk-on
- Injured
- Current redshirt

Roster
Last update: November 12, 2025

== Schedule and results ==
Date time, TV	Rank^{#}	Opponent^{#}	Result	Record	High points	High rebounds	High assists	Site (attendance) city, state
Exhibition
October 22, 2025*; 7:00 pm		Alma	W 111–77	–	20 – Marshall IV	12 – Garrett	7 – Robinson	OU Credit Union O'rena (1,282); Auburn Hills, MI
October 30, 2025*; 7:00 pm, ESPN+		Rochester Christian	W 99–90	–	28 – Naivalurua	7 – Garrett	7 – Thurmon	OU Credit Union O'rena; Auburn Hills, MI
Regular season
November 3, 2025*; 8:30 pm, FS1		at No. 7 Michigan	L 78–121	0–1	20 – Garrett	6 – Wells	5 – Robinson	Crisler Center (11,801); Ann Arbor, MI
November 7, 2025*; 7:00 pm, Peacock		at No. 1 Purdue	L 77–87	0–2	21 – Wells	12 – Wells	4 – 2 tied	Mackey Arena (14,876); West Lafayette, IN
November 12, 2025*; 8:00 pm, ESPN+		at No. 1 Houston	L 45–78	0–3	20 – Garrett	7 – Garrett	3 – Robinson	Fertitta Center (7,035); Houston, TX
November 15, 2025*; 3:00 pm, ESPN+		Defiance	W 113–47	1–3	18 – White II	10 – Deer	6 – Robinson	OU Credit Union O'rena (1,821); Auburn Hills, MI
November 17, 2025*; 7:00 pm, ESPN+		at UCF	L 83–87	1–4	23 – Garrett	7 – Garrett	5 – Naivalurua	Addition Financial Arena (5,559); Orlando, FL
November 21, 2025*; 6:30 pm, ESPN+		at Eastern Michigan	L 91–97	1–5	22 – Robinson	6 – Garrett	7 – Robinson	George Gervin GameAbove Center (1,727); Ypsilanti, MI
November 24, 2025*; 4:00 pm, ESPN+		vs. Lamar; Blaine Taylor Classic	W 83–68	2–5	21 – Naivalurua	8 – Houge	10 – Robinson	Dahlberg Arena (117); Missoula, MT
November 25, 2025*; 9:00 pm, ESPN+		at Montana; Blaine Taylor Classic	W 95–87	3–5	23 – Robinson	9 – Garrett	8 – Robinson	Dahlberg Arena (3,025); Missoula, MT
December 3, 2025; 7:00 pm, ESPN+		Purdue Fort Wayne	W 101–92	4–5 (1–0)	27 – Robinson	8 – Houge	8 – Robinson	OU Credit Union O'rena (1,582); Auburn Hills, MI
December 6, 2025*; 3:00 pm, ESPN+		Toledo	W 98–97	5–5	21 – Wells	8 – Garrett	9 – Robinson	OU Credit Union O'rena (2,023); Auburn Hills, MI
December 13, 2025*; 6:00 pm, ESPN+		at Northern Iowa	L 63–75	5–6	12 – 2 tied	12 – Garrett	5 – Robinson	McLeod Center (3,794); Cedar Falls, IA
December 17, 2025; 7:00 pm, ESPN+		at Northern Kentucky	W 82–77	6–6 (2–0)	18 – Houge	11 – Garrett	6 – Robinson	Truist Arena (1,714); Highland Heights, KY
December 20, 2025*; 12:00 pm, BTN		vs. No. 9 Michigan State	L 70–79	6–7	18 – Naivalurua	6 – Garrett	8 – Robinson	Little Caesars Arena (15,789); Detroit, MI
December 29, 2025; 7:00 pm, ESPN+		at Wright State	L 73–88	6–8 (2–1)	27 – Robinson	12 – Houge	1 – 5 tied	Nutter Center (3,142); Fairborn, OH
January 1, 2026; 1:00 pm, ESPN+		at Youngstown State	W 85–83	7–8 (3–1)	27 – Garrett	14 – Garrett	7 – Robinson	Beeghly Center (1,396); Youngstown, OH
January 4, 2026; 3:00 pm, ESPN+		Robert Morris	W 96–73	8–8 (4–1)	30 – Garrett	7 – 2 tied	8 – Robinson	OU Credit Union O'rena (1,880); Auburn Hills, MI
January 9, 2026; 7:00 pm, ESPN+		Cleveland State	W 97–74	9–8 (5–1)	23 – Wells	10 – 2 tied	10 – Robinson	OU Credit Union O'rena (1,937); Auburn Hills, MI
January 11, 2026; 3:00 pm, ESPN2		Wright State	L 84–94	9–9 (5–2)	35 – Robinson	6 – Naivalurua	3 – 2 tied	OU Credit Union O'rena (2,774); Auburn Hills, MI
January 15, 2026; 7:00 pm, ESPNU		at Milwaukee	W 73–60	10–9 (6–2)	19 – Houge	12 – Garrett	4 – 2 tied	UW–Milwaukee Panther Arena (1,643); Milwaukee, WI
January 18, 2026; 2:00 pm, ESPN+		at Green Bay	W 88–63	11–9 (7–2)	26 – Naivalurua	10 – 2 tied	5 – Robinson	Resch Center (2,011); Ashwaubenon, WI
January 21, 2026; 7:00 pm, ESPN+		IU Indy	L 85–103	11–10 (7–3)	18 – Garrett	5 – Houge	11 – Robinson	OU Credit Union O'rena (2,233); Auburn Hills, MI
January 24, 2026; 3:00 pm, ESPN+		at Detroit Mercy; Metro Series	W 95–87	12–10 (8–3)	24 – 2 tied	8 – Naivalurua	10 – Robinson	Calihan Hall (2,833); Detroit, MI
January 28, 2026; 7:00 pm, ESPN+		at Purdue Fort Wayne	W 74–65	13–10 (9–3)	15 – Houge	11 – 2 tied	5 – Robinson	Gates Sports Center (1,243); Fort Wayne, IN
February 1, 2026; 3:00 pm, ESPN+		Northern Kentucky	W 76–65	14–10 (10–3)	21 – Robinson	12 – Houge	7 – Robinson	OU Credit Union O'rena (2,074); Auburn Hills, MI
February 4, 2026; 7:00 pm, ESPN+		at Cleveland State	L 78–91	14–11 (10–4)	2 – 2 tied	9 – Houge	8 – Robinson	Wolstein Center (1,467); Cleveland, OH
February 12, 2026; 7:00 pm, ESPN+		Youngstown State	L 82–86	14–12 (10–5)	21 – Houge	7 – Naivalurua	8 – Robinson	OU Credit Union O'rena (2,402); Auburn Hills, MI
February 15, 2026; 2:00 pm, SNP/ESPN+		at Robert Morris	L 69–93	14–13 (10–6)	19 – Wells	7 – Garrett	7 – Robinson	UPMC Events Center (1,649); Moon Township, PA
February 20, 2026; 7:00 pm, ESPN+		Green Bay	L 68–73	14–14 (10–7)	17 – Garrett	10 – Garrett	6 – Robinson	OU Credit Union O'rena (2,492); Auburn Hills, MI
February 22, 2026; 3:00 pm, ESPN+		Milwaukee	W 81–70	15–14 (11–7)	23 – Naivalurua	9 – Naivalurua	9 – Robinson	OU Credit Union O'rena (2,686); Auburn Hills, MI
February 25, 2026; 6:30 pm, ESPN+		at IU Indy	W 86–74	16–14 (12–7)	19 – Robinson	9 – Garrett	13 – Robinson	The Jungle (617); Indianapolis, IN
February 28, 2026; 3:00 pm, ESPN+		Detroit Mercy; Metro Series	L 89–95	16–15 (12–8)	24 – Naivalurua	6 – 2 tied	9 – Robinson	OU Credit Union O'rena (3,721); Auburn Hills, MI
Horizon League tournament
March 4, 2026; 7:00 pm, ESPN+	(4)	(7) Northern Kentucky; First round	L 84–85	16–16	36 – Robinson	8 – Naivalurua	4 – Naivalurua	OU Credit Union O'rena (1,942); Auburn Hills, MI
*Non-conference game. ^{#}Rankings from AP Poll. (#) Tournament seedings in parentheses. All times are in Eastern.
