= 2025–26 Green Bay Phoenix men's basketball team =

American college basketball season

2025–26 Green Bay Phoenix men's basketball
- Conference: Horizon League
- Record: 18–15 (12–8 Horizon)
- Head coach: Doug Gottlieb (2nd season); Kerry Rupp (1 game)
- Assistant coaches: Keil Ganz; Kerry Rupp; Aerick Sanders; Jerry Smith
- Home arena: Resch Center; Kress Events Center

2025–26 Horizon League men's basketball standings
	Conf.				Overall
Team	W		L	PCT	W		L	PCT
Wright State †	15	–	5	.750	23	–	12	.657
Robert Morris	13	–	7	.650	22	–	11	.667
Detroit Mercy	12	–	8	.600	17	–	15	.531
Oakland	12	–	8	.600	16	–	16	.500
Green Bay	12	–	8	.600	18	–	15	.545
Purdue Fort Wayne	11	–	9	.550	17	–	15	.531
Northern Kentucky	10	–	10	.500	20	–	14	.588
Milwaukee	8	–	12	.400	12	–	20	.375
Youngstown State	8	–	12	.400	15	–	17	.469
Cleveland State	6	–	14	.300	11	–	22	.333
IU Indy	3	–	17	.150	7	–	25	.219
† 2026 Horizon League tournament winner

The 2025–26 Green Bay Phoenix men's basketball team represented the University of Wisconsin–Green Bay during the 2025–26 NCAA Division I men's basketball season. They were led by second-year head coach Doug Gottlieb, and played their home games at the Resch Center and Kress Events Center in Green Bay, Wisconsin as members of the Horizon League.

== Previous season ==
The Phoenix finished the 2024–25 season 4–28, 2–18 in Horizon League play, to finish in last place. As the No. 11 seed in the Horizon League tournament, they lost to Oakland in the first round.

== Preseason ==
On October 8, 2025, the Horizon League released their preseason poll. Green Bay was picked to finish last in the conference. One player was named to the preseason All-Horizon League First Team.

=== Preseason rankings ===
Horizon League Preseason Coaches Poll
Rank	Team	Points
1	Milwaukee	428 (24)
2	Oakland	384 (7)
3	Youngstown State	364 (2)
4	Robert Morris	345 (8)
5	Purdue Fort Wayne	287 (1)
6	Northern Kentucky	274
7	Wright State	221
8	Cleveland State	217 (2)
9	Detroit Mercy	176
10	IU Indy	115
11	Green Bay	93
(#) first-place votes

=== Preseason All-Horizon League Teams ===
Preseason All-Horizon League Teams
Team	Player	Position	Year
First	Marcus Hall	Forward	Junior

== Offseason ==
=== Departures ===
Green Bay departures
Name	Number	Pos.	Height	Year	Hometown	Reason for departure
Ryan Wade	15	G	6'2"	RS Senior	Ann Arbor, MI	Graduated
Mouhamadou Cissé	77	C	6'10"	Sophomore	Dakar, Senegal	Transferred to UT Permian Basin (DII)
Jeremiah Johnson	3	G	6'3"	Freshman	Phoenix, AZ	Transferred to Campbell
Donovan Santoro	7	F	6'8"	Sophomore	Los Angeles, CA	Transferred to St. Edward's (DII)
Bennett Basich	8	G	6'4"	Freshman	Hartland, WI	Transferred to Northern Michigan (DII)
Ben Tweedy	6	G	6'2"	Freshman	Southport, Queensland	Transferred to Colgate
Ayden Goll	1	G	6'2"	Freshman	Milton, WI	Transferred to Wheeling (DII)
Anthony Roy	9	G	6'5"	Senior	Oakland, CA	Transferred to Oklahoma State
Foster Wonders	0	G	6'5"	RS Junior	Iron Mountain, MI	Transferred to Cleveland State
Yonatan Levy	34/40	F	6'9"	Freshman	Hod HaSharon, Israel	Transferred to Pepperdine
Roee Oselka	31	F/C	6'10"	Freshman	Givatayim, Israel	Transferred to Howard College (JUCO)

=== Incoming transfers ===
Green Bay incoming transfers
Name	Number	Pos.	Height	Year	Hometown	Previous school
Justin Allen	7	G	6'4"	Senior	Mount Kisco, NY	Carnegie Mellon (DIII)
LeBron Thomas	22	G	6'3"	Junior	Bishopville, SC	Vincennes (JUCO)
Rob Stroud	15	F	6'5"	Graduate	Danville, IL	Lewis (DII)
Ramel Bathea	0	F	6'9"	Sophomore	Fort Washington, MD	MiraCosta College (JUCO)
Josh Hines	1	G	6'2"	RS Junior	Macomb, MI	Macomb CC (JUCO)
Dontrell Hewlett	12	G	6'4"	Graduate	Sacramento, CA	UT Tyler (DII)

=== Recruiting classes ===
==== 2025 recruiting class ====
College recruiting information
Name	Hometown	School	Height	Weight	Commit date
Keegan VanKauwenberg; PG	Kaukauna, WI	Kaukauna High School	6 ft 3 in (1.91 m)	N/A	Oct 28, 2024
Keegan VanKauwenberg; PG	Recruit ratings: 247Sports: On3: ESPN:				
Trey Schachte; PG	Pittsburgh, PA	Taylor Allderdice High School	6 ft 3 in (1.91 m)	175 lb (79 kg)	Feb 7, 2025
Trey Schachte; PG	Recruit ratings: 247Sports: On3: ESPN:				
Vukašin Todorović; PF	Ljubljana, Slovenia	KK Šenčur	6 ft 8 in (2.03 m)	N/A	Apr 28, 2025
Vukašin Todorović; PF	Recruit ratings: 247Sports: On3: ESPN:				
Maruan Čičić; C	Bar, Montenegro	Hoosac School	7 ft 0 in (2.13 m)	230 lb (100 kg)	Jun 8, 2025
Maruan Čičić; C	Recruit ratings: 247Sports: On3: ESPN:				
Overall recruit ranking: 247Sports: — On3: — ESPN: —
Note: In many cases, Scout, Rivals, 247Sports, On3, and ESPN may conflict in their listings of height and weight.; In these cases, the average was taken. ESPN grades are on a 100-point scale.; Sources: "2025 Green Bay Phoenix Recruiting Class". ESPN.; "2025 Team Ranking". Rivals.; "2025–26 Green Bay Phoenix men's basketball team". On3.

== Roster ==
2025–26 Green Bay Phoenix men's basketball team
Players
Coaches

Pos.	#	Name	Height	Weight	Year	Previous school	Hometown
F	0	Ramel Bethea	6 ft 9 in (2.06 m)	—	So	MiraCosta College	Fort Washington, MD
G	1	Josh Hines	6 ft 2 in (1.88 m)	165 lb (75 kg)	RS Jr	Macomb CC	Macomb, MI
G	2	Preston Ruedinger	6 ft 2 in (1.88 m)	185 lb (84 kg)	RS Sr	Valparaiso	Oshkosh, WI
G	3	Keegan Van Kauwenberg	6 ft 3 in (1.91 m)	—	Fr	Kaukauna HS	Kaukauna, WI
G	4	Mac Wrecke	6 ft 5 in (1.96 m)	—	RS So	Arrowhead HS	Hartland, WI
F	6	Vuskain Todorovic	6 ft 8 in (2.03 m)	—	Fr	KK Šenčur	Ljubljana, Slovenia
G	7	Justin Allen	6 ft 4 in (1.93 m)	—	Sr	Carnegie Mellon	Mt. Kisco, NY
G	10	C.J. O'Hara	6 ft 4 in (1.93 m)	—	So	Combine Academy	Minneapolis, MN
G	11	Trey Schachter	6 ft 3 in (1.91 m)	—	Fr	Allderdice HS	Pittsburgh, PA
G	12	Dontrell Hewlett	6 ft 4 in (1.93 m)	—	GS	UT Tyler	Sacramento, CA
F	13	Marcus Hall	6 ft 6 in (1.98 m)	—	Jr	D.C. Everest HS	Schofield, WI
F	15	Rob Stroud	6 ft 5 in (1.96 m)	—	GS	Lewis	Danville, IL
C	20	Maruan Cicic	7 ft 0 in (2.13 m)	—	Fr	Hoosac School	Bar, Montenegro
G	21	Brady Fitzgerald	6 ft 4 in (1.93 m)	—	RS Fr	Mt. Vernon HS	Fortville, IN
G	22	LeBron Thomas	6 ft 3 in (1.91 m)	—	Jr	Vincennes	Bishopville, SC
F	23	Caden Wilkins	6 ft 6 in (1.98 m)	—	RS Fr	Bettendorf HS	Bettendorf, IA

Head coach

- Doug Gottlieb (Oklahoma State)

Assistant coach(es)

- Keil Ganz (Green Bay)
- Aerick Sanders (San Diego State)
- Kerry Rupp (Southern Utah)
- Jerry Smith (Louisville)

Legend

- (C) Team captain
- (S) Suspended
- (I) Ineligible
- (W) Walk-on
- Injured
- Current redshirt

Roster
Last update: November 18, 2025

== Schedule and results ==
Date time, TV	Rank^{#}	Opponent^{#}	Result	Record	High points	High rebounds	High assists	Site (attendance) city, state
Regular season
November 3, 2025*; 7:00 p.m., ESPN+		at No. 19 Kansas	L 51–94	0–1	17 – Hall	4 – Tied	2 – Tied	Allen Fieldhouse (15,300); Lawrence, KS
November 7, 2025*; 5:30 p.m., ESPN+		at Buffalo	L 76–83	0–2	22 – Wilkins	7 – O'Hara	7 – Hall	Alumni Arena (1,373); Amherst, NY
November 10, 2025*; 11:00 a.m., ESPN+		Ripon	W 83–63	1–2	21 – Hall	10 – Hall	7 – Ruedinger	Kress Center (2,294); Green Bay, WI
November 13, 2025*; 7:00 p.m., S.L. Network		at St. Thomas	L 61–80	1–3	10 – Wrecke	4 – Tied	4 – Ruedinger	Anderson Arena (2,658); St. Paul, MN
November 15, 2025*; 8:00 p.m., B10+		at Minnesota	L 65–72 ^{OT}	1–4	15 – Tied	8 – O'Hara	6 – Ruedinger	Williams Arena (7,431); Minneapolis, MN
November 21, 2025*; 11:30 a.m., ESPN+		vs. Yale; Paradise Jam quarterfinals	L 67–73	1–5	20 – Hall	8 – Hall	7 – Ruedinger	UVI Sports and Fitness Center; St. Thomas, USVI
November 22, 2025*; 2:00 p.m., ESPN+		vs. UMass; Paradise Jam consolation semifinal	W 79–75	2–5	27 – Allen	5 – Ruedinger	3 – Ruedinger	UVI Sports and Fitness Center; St. Thomas, USVI
November 24, 2025*; 2:00 p.m., ESPN+		vs. Iona; Paradise Jam 5th place game	W 80–75	3–5	28 – Allen	9 – Wilkins	7 – Ruedinger	UVI Sports and Fitness Center (324); St. Thomas, USVI
November 29, 2025*; 1:00 p.m., ESPN+		Haskell Indian Nations	W 95–55	4–5	30 – Ruedinger	8 – Bethea	4 – Ruedinger	Kress Center (2,744); Green Bay, WI
December 4, 2025; 6:00 p.m., ESPN+/WACY-TV		Robert Morris	L 78–80	4–6 (0–1)	20 – Allen	7 – O'Hara	6 – Ruedinger	Kress Center (1,535); Green Bay, WI
December 7, 2025; 4:00 p.m., ESPN+		at Wright State	L 58–86	4–7 (0–2)	19 – O'Hara	5 – Allen	4 – Ruedinger	Nutter Center (3,056); Fairborn, OH
December 11, 2025; 5:30 p.m., ESPN+		at IU Indy	W 85–75	5–7 (1–2)	20 – Tied	9 – Hall	5 – Ruedinger	The Jungle (676); Indianapolis, IN
December 17, 2025*; 6:00 p.m., ESPN+/WACY-TV		UC Santa Barbara	W 67–64	6–7	25 – Hall	5 – Hall	13 – Ruedinger	Kress Center (1,510); Green Bay, WI
December 23, 2025*; 11:00 a.m., ESPN+		at Campbell	L 79–102	6–8	14 – Ruedinger	5 – O'Hara	3 – Ruedinger	Gore Arena (1,411); Buies Creek, NC
January 1, 2026; 1:00 p.m., ESPN+		at Purdue Fort Wayne	W 72–54	7–8 (2–2)	21 – Allen	10 – Wilkins	3 – Ruedinger	Memorial Coliseum (1,723); Fort Wayne, IN
January 5, 2026; 6:00 p.m., ESPN+		Milwaukee	W 79–76	8–8 (3–2)	21 – Allen	5 – Bethea	5 – Ruedinger	Kress Center (1,864); Green Bay, WI
January 9, 2026; 6:00 p.m., ESPN+		IU Indy	W 75–59	9–8 (4–2)	24 – Ruedinger	12 – Hall	4 – O'Hara	Kress Center (1,531); Green Bay, WI
January 11, 2026; 1:00 p.m., ESPN+		Northern Kentucky	W 80–78	10–8 (5–2)	27 – Allen	6 – Ruedinger	9 – Hall	Kress Center (1,594); Green Bay, WI
January 15, 2026; 6:00 p.m., ESPN+		at Cleveland State	W 88–73	11–8 (6–2)	23 – Ruedinger	7 – Tied	10 – Ruedinger	Wolstein Center (2,012); Cleveland, OH
January 18, 2026; 1:00 p.m., ESPN+		Oakland	L 63–88	11–9 (6–3)	11 – Bethea	6 – Allen	8 – Ruedinger	Kress Center (2,011); Green Bay, WI
January 22, 2026; 5:30 p.m., ESPN+		at Youngstown State	L 81–88	11–10 (6–4)	22 – O'Hara	6 – Ruedinger	5 – Ruedinger	Beeghly Center (1,721); Youngstown, OH
January 24, 2026; 1:00 p.m., ESPN+		at Robert Morris	W 71–67	12–10 (7–4)	18 – O'Hara	9 – Allen	5 – Ruedinger	UPMC Events Center (1,487); Moon Township, PA
January 30, 2026; 6:00 p.m., ESPN+		Cleveland State	L 82–89	12–11 (7–5)	23 – Ruedinger	7 – Hall	8 – Ruedinger	Resch Center (2,429); Ashwaubenon, WI
February 1, 2026; 1:00 p.m., ESPN+		Wright State	L 75–83	12–12 (7–6)	21 – O'Hara	6 – Ruedinger	6 – Ruedinger	Resch Center (2,194); Ashwaubenon, WI
February 4, 2026; 6:00 p.m., ESPN+		at Northern Kentucky	W 87–84 ^{OT}	13–12 (8–6)	23 – O'Hara	10 – Allen	5 – Hall	Truist Arena (2,212); Highland Heights, KY
February 7, 2026; 1:00 p.m., ESPN+		Detroit Mercy	W 76–63	14–12 (9–6)	17 – O'Hara	7 – O'Hara	5 – Ruedinger	Resch Center (1,980); Ashwaubenon, WI
February 12, 2026; 6:00 p.m., ESPN2		Purdue Fort Wayne	W 76-59	15–12 (10–6)	34 – Allen	5 – Allen	6 – Ruedinger	Kress Center (2,531); Green Bay, WI
February 15, 2026; 2:00 p.m., ESPN+		at Milwaukee	L 72–75	15–13 (10–7)	32 – Hall	7 – Hall	5 – Ruedinger	UW-Milwaukee Panther Arena (4,363); Milwaukee, WI
February 20, 2026; 6:00 p.m., ESPN+		at Oakland	W 73–68	16–13 (11–7)	21 – Allen	4 – Tied	5 – Allen	The Blacktop (2,492); Auburn Hills, MI
February 22, 2026; 12:00 p.m., ESPN+		at Detroit Mercy	L 70–74	16–14 (11–8)	19 – Ruedinger	5 – Tied	6 – Ruedinger	Calihan Hall (1,887); Detroit, MI
February 28, 2026; 1:00 p.m., ESPN+		Youngstown State; Senior Day	W 85–63	17–14 (12–8)	22 – Allen	8 – Ruedinger	7 – Ruedinger	Kress Center (2,438); Green Bay, WI
Horizon League tournament
March 3, 2026; 6:00 p.m., ESPN+	(5)	(6) Purdue Fort Wayne; First round	W 64–56	18–14	19 – Hall	5 – Tied	8 – Ruedinger	Kress Center (2,067); Green Bay, WI
March 8, 2026; 2:30 p.m., ESPN+	(5)	vs. (7) Northern Kentucky; Second round	L 76–96	18–15	18 – Allen	4 – Allen	10 – Ruedinger	Corteva Coliseum; Indianapolis, IN
*Non-conference game. ^{#}Rankings from AP poll. (#) Tournament seedings in parentheses. All times are in Central.
