= 2025–26 Western Michigan Broncos men's basketball team =

American college basketball season

2025–26 Western Michigan Broncos men's basketball
- Conference: Mid-American Conference
- Record: 10–21 (4–14 MAC)
- Head coach: Dwayne Stephens (4th season)
- Assistant coaches: Jeff Rutter; Manny Dosanjh; Tyler Kelly; Thomas Kithier; Sam Little
- Home arena: University Arena

2025–26 Mid-American Conference men's basketball standings
	Conf.				Overall
Team	W		L	PCT	W		L	PCT
Miami (OH)	18	–	0	1.000	32	–	2	.941
Akron †	17	–	1	.944	29	–	6	.829
Kent State	14	–	4	.778	24	–	10	.706
Toledo	11	–	7	.611	19	–	15	.559
Bowling Green	9	–	9	.500	18	–	14	.563
Ohio	9	–	9	.500	15	–	17	.469
Buffalo	7	–	11	.389	17	–	15	.531
UMass	7	–	11	.389	17	–	16	.515
Ball State	7	–	11	.389	12	–	19	.387
Central Michigan	6	–	12	.333	10	–	21	.323
Western Michigan	4	–	14	.222	10	–	21	.323
Northern Illinois	4	–	14	.222	9	–	21	.300
Eastern Michigan	4	–	14	.222	10	–	21	.323
† 2026 MAC tournament winner

The 2025–26 Western Michigan Broncos men's basketball team represented Western Michigan University during the 2025–26 NCAA Division I men's basketball season. The Broncos, led by fourth-year head coach Dwayne Stephens, played their home games at University Arena in Kalamazoo, Michigan as a member of the Mid-American Conference (MAC). They finished the season 10–21, 4–14 in MAC play, to finish in a three-way tie for last place. They failed to qualify for the MAC tournament.

On March 8, 2026, the school fired head coach Dwayne Stephens. On March 21, the school named UT Rio Grande Valley's head coach, Kahil Fennell, the team's new head coach.

== Previous season ==
The Broncos finished the 2024–25 season 12–20, 9–9 in MAC play to finish in a tie for sixth place. As the No. 6 seed in the MAC Tournament, they lost to Kent State in the quarterfinals.

== Offseason ==
=== Departures ===
Departures
Name	Number	Pos.	Height	Weight	Year	Hometown	Reason for departure
Donovan Williams	0	G	6' 5"	220	Graduate student	Rockford, IL	Graduated
Marquese Josephs	1	G	6' 1"	200	Sophomore	Toronto, ON	Transferred to Saginaw Valley State
Chansey Willis Jr.	2	G	6' 2"	190	Junior	Detroit, MI	Transferred to Minnesota
JaVaughn Hannah	4	G	6' 4"	205	Junior	Mount Clemens, MI	Transferred to San Jose State
Brandon Muntu	7	G	6' 4"	190	RS Junior	Calgary, AB	Transferred to Tennessee Tech
Hutch Ward	12	F	6' 7"	210	Sophomore	Kalamazoo, MI	Left team
Seryee Lewis	15	F	6' 9"	240	RS Sophomore	Chicago, IL	Transferred to Prairie View A&M
Owen Lobsinger	20	F	6' 9"	225	Senior	Flint, MI	Graduated
Markhi Strickland	22	G/F	6' 6"	210	RS Junior	Miami, FL	Transferred to North Dakota State
Josh Thomas	23	G/F	6' 6"	185	RS Freshman	Lincolnshire, IL	Transferred to Saginaw Valley State
Jack Stefanski	33	F	6' 6"	205	RS Junior	Frankfort, MI	Transferred to Saginaw Valley State

=== Incoming transfers ===
Incoming transfers
Name	Number	Pos.	Height	Weight	Year	Hometown	Previous school
Trey Lewis	1	G	6' 6"	200	RS Junior	Ferndale, MI	Purdue Fort Wayne
Jalen Griffith	2	G	5' 10"	150	Junior	Chicago, IL	Navarro
Hudson Ward	8	F	6' 7"	220	Sophomore	Leduc, AB	Penn State
Justice Williams	11	G	6' 4"	185	RS Senior	Philadelphia, PA	Robert Morris
Jayden Brewer	12	G	6' 6"	160	Senior	Indianapolis, IN	FIU
Declan Peterson	22	C	6' 11"	250	Senior	Bentley, AB	Calgary

=== Recruiting class ===
College recruiting information
Name	Hometown	School	Height	Weight	Commit date
Sharod Barnes; G	Ypsilanti, MI	St. Mary's Preparatory	6 ft 2 in (1.88 m)	180 lb (82 kg)	
Sharod Barnes; G	Recruit ratings: Rivals: 247Sports: ESPN: (N/A)				
Brady Swartz; G/F	Grand Rapids, MI	Northview High School	6 ft 7 in (2.01 m)	195 lb (88 kg)	
Brady Swartz; G/F	Recruit ratings: Rivals: 247Sports: ESPN: (N/A)				
Camden Thompson; G	Whitehall, MI	Whitehall Senior High School	6 ft 5 in (1.96 m)	200 lb (91 kg)	
Camden Thompson; G	Recruit ratings: Rivals: 247Sports: ESPN: (N/A)				
Carson Vis; G	Byron Center, MI	South Christian High School	6 ft 3 in (1.91 m)	190 lb (86 kg)	
Carson Vis; G	Recruit ratings: Rivals: 247Sports: ESPN: (N/A)				
Overall recruit ranking:
Note: In many cases, Scout, Rivals, 247Sports, On3, and ESPN may conflict in their listings of height and weight.; In these cases, the average was taken. ESPN grades are on a 100-point scale.; Sources: "2025 Team Ranking". Rivals.

== Preseason ==
On October 21, 2025, the MAC released the preseason coaches poll. Western Michigan was picked to finish tenth in the MAC regular season.

=== Preseason rankings ===
MAC preseason poll
Predicted finish	Team	Votes (1st place)
1	Akron	143 (11)
2	Miami (OH)	133 (2)
3	Kent State	122
4	Ohio	108
5	UMass	98
6	Toledo	95
7	Bowling Green	73
8	Ball State	62
9	Eastern Michigan	52
10	Western Michigan	46
11	Buffalo	37
12	Central Michigan	31
13	Northern Illinois	14

MAC Tournament Champions: Akron (8), Miami (OH) (2), Kent State (1), Ohio (1), UMass (1)

== Roster ==
2025–26 Western Michigan Broncos men's basketball team
Players
Coaches

Pos.	#	Name	Height	Weight	Year	Previous school	Hometown
G	0	Sharod Barnes	6 ft 2 in (1.88 m)	180 lb (82 kg)	Fr	Orchard Lake St. Mary's	Ypsilanti, MI
G	1	Trey Lewis	6 ft 6 in (1.98 m)	200 lb (91 kg)	RS Jr	Purdue Fort Wayne	Ferndale, MI
G	2	Jalen Griffith	5 ft 10 in (1.78 m)	150 lb (68 kg)	Jr	Navarro College	Chicago, IL
G	3	EJ Ryans	6 ft 3 in (1.91 m)	185 lb (84 kg)	So	Northview High School	Grand Rapids, MI
G/F	4	Brady Swartz	6 ft 7 in (2.01 m)	195 lb (88 kg)	Fr	Northview High School	Grand Rapids, MI
G	7	Carson Vis	6 ft 3 in (1.91 m)	190 lb (86 kg)	Fr	Grand Rapids South Christian	Byron Center, MI
F	8	Hudson Ward	6 ft 7 in (2.01 m)	220 lb (100 kg)	So	Penn State	Leduc, AB
G	9	Nicholas Errica	6 ft 3 in (1.91 m)	185 lb (84 kg)	RS Fr	Luiss Roma	Cremona, Italy
F	10	Max Burton	6 ft 10 in (2.08 m)	240 lb (109 kg)	RS Jr	Williamston High School	Williamston, MI
G	11	Justice Williams	6 ft 4 in (1.93 m)	185 lb (84 kg)	RS Sr	Robert Morris	Philadelphia, PA
G	12	Jayden Brewer	6 ft 6 in (1.98 m)	160 lb (73 kg)	Sr	FIU	Indianapolis, IN
C	22	Declan Peterson	6 ft 11 in (2.11 m)	250 lb (113 kg)	Sr	Calgary	Bentley, AB
G	23	Camden Thompson	6 ft 5 in (1.96 m)	200 lb (91 kg)	Fr	Whitehall Senior High School	Whitehall, MI
F	24	Michael Sulaka	6 ft 9 in (2.06 m)	215 lb (98 kg)	RS So	De La Salle High School	Macomb, MI
F	52	Junior Sileu	6 ft 10 in (2.08 m)	220 lb (100 kg)	RS Fr	AZ Compass Prep	Douala, Cameroon

Head coach

- Dwayne Stephens (Michigan State)

Assistant coach(es)

- Jeff Rutter (Winona State)
- Manny Dosanjh (Oral Roberts)
- Tyler Kelly (Florida Southern)
- Thomas Kithier (Michigan State)
- Sam Little (Texas)

Legend

- (C) Team captain
- (S) Suspended
- (I) Ineligible
- (W) Walk-on
- Injured
- Current redshirt

Roster
Last update: November 21, 2025

== Schedule and results ==
Date time, TV	Rank^{#}	Opponent^{#}	Result	Record	High points	High rebounds	High assists	Site (attendance) city, state
Exhibition
October 29, 2025*; 7:00 p.m.		Kalamazoo	W 80–39	–	– -	– -	– -	University Arena; Kalamazoo, MI
Regular season
November 3, 2025*; 7:00 p.m., ESPN+		Coastal Carolina; MAC-SBC Challenge	W 76–71	1–0	15 – Griffith	8 – Brewer	7 – Burton	University Arena (1,443); Kalamazoo, MI
November 6, 2025*; 7:00 p.m., ESPN+		Northwood	L 81–85	1–1	24 – Brewer	12 – Brewer	3 – Tied	University Arena (1,222); Kalamazoo, MI
November 9, 2025*; 12:30 p.m., FloHoops		at Campbell	L 82–91	1–2	19 – Griffith	6 – Tied	7 – Griffith	Gore Arena (1,392); Buies Creek, NC
November 12, 2025*; 7:00 p.m., ESPN+		Purdue Fort Wayne	W 83–71	2–2	26 – Brewer	12 – Brewer	6 – Griffith	University Arena (1,123); Kalamazoo, MI
November 16, 2025*; 2:00 p.m., SLN		at South Dakota	L 78–83	2–3	20 – Brewer	10 – Tied	4 – Tied	Sanford Coyote Sports Center (1,234); Vermillion, SD
November 20, 2025*; 8:00 p.m., BTN		at Ohio State	L 58–91	2–4	20 – Swartz	9 – Swartz	3 – Ryans	Value City Arena (8,294); Columbus, OH
November 23, 2025*; 3:00 p.m., ESPN+		Mount St. Mary's	W 83–60	3–4	30 – Griffith	6 – Swartz	5 – Burton	University Arena (1,284); Kalamazoo, MI
November 29, 2025*; 3:00 p.m., ESPN+		at Valparaiso	L 55–84	3–5	18 – Dease	9 – Tupuola	3 – Tied	Athletics–Recreation Center (1,107); Valparaiso, IN
December 3, 2025*; 7:00 p.m., ESPN+		Southern Indiana	W 88–74	4–5	26 – Brewer	10 – Brewer	4 – Tied	University Arena (1,029); Kalamazoo, MI
December 6, 2025*; 2:00 p.m., ESPN+		at SIU Edwardsville	W 83–73	5–5	28 – Griffith	7 – Tied	10 – Griffith	First Community Arena (1,497); Edwardsville, IL
December 14, 2025*; 3:00 p.m., BTN		at Iowa	L 51–91	5–6	11 – Tied	7 – Ward	5 – Griffith	Carver–Hawkeye Arena (10,341); Iowa City, IA
December 20, 2025; 1:00 p.m., ESPN+		Buffalo	L 71–88	5–7 (0–1)	18 – Griffith	7 – Brewer	6 – Ryans	University Arena (1,403); Kalamazoo, MI
December 22, 2025*; 1:00 p.m., ESPN+		Defiance	W 94–57	6–7	16 – Griffith	8 – Brewer	6 – Griffith	University Arena (1,171); Kalamazoo, MI
December 30, 2025; 6:30 p.m., ESPN+		at Toledo	L 79–84	6–8 (0–2)	20 – Williams	11 – Brewer	3 – Tied	Savage Arena (4,232); Toledo, OH
January 6, 2026; 7:00 p.m., ESPN+		at Miami (OH)	L 76–87	6–9 (0–3)	19 – Brewer	9 – Brewer	4 – Brewer	Millett Hall (1,407); Oxford, OH
January 10, 2026; 1:00 p.m., ESPN+		Eastern Michigan	W 79–62	7–9 (1–3)	21 – Griffith	8 – Tied	5 – Griffith	University Arena (1,542); Kalamazoo, MI
January 13, 2026; 7:00 p.m., ESPN+		UMass	L 82–85	7–10 (1–4)	29 – Williams	6 – Peterson	4 – Barnes	University Arena (1,536); Kalamazoo, MI
January 17, 2026; 2:00 p.m., ESPN+		at Akron	L 89–104	7–11 (1–5)	28 – Williams	7 – Brewer	8 – Griffith	James A. Rhodes Arena (2,396); Akron, OH
January 20, 2026; 7:00 p.m., ESPN+		Bowling Green	L 54–72	7–12 (1–6)	18 – Williams	10 – Burton	3 – Ryans	University Arena (1,086); Kalamazoo, MI
January 24, 2026; 6:00 p.m., ESPN+		Central Michigan	W 77–65	8–12 (2–6)	20 – Brewer	11 – Brewer	2 – Tied	University Arena (4,776); Kalamazoo, MI
January 27, 2026; 8:00 p.m., ESPN+		at Northern Illinois	L 65–85	8–13 (2–7)	16 – Swartz	6 – Swartz	3 – Tied	Convocation Center (1,003); DeKalb, IL
February 3, 2026; 7:00 p.m., ESPN+		at Ohio	L 71–91	8–14 (2–8)	20 – Brewer	6 – Peterson	3 – Griffith	Convocation Center (3,113); Athens, OH
February 7, 2026*; 3:00 p.m., ESPN+		at Texas State; MAC-SBC Challenge	L 61–77	8–15	19 – Lewis	7 – Brewer	3 – Ryans	Strahan Arena (2,774); San Marcos, TX
February 11, 2026; 7:00 p.m., ESPN+		Toledo	L 79–90	8–16 (2–9)	22 – Williams	9 – Swartz	3 – Tied	University Arena (1,522); Kalamazoo, MI
February 14, 2026; 2:00 p.m., ESPN+		at Eastern Michigan	W 76–62	9–16 (3–9)	16 – Swartz	7 – Tied	3 – Tied	George Gervin GameAbove Center (1,804); Ypsilanti, MI
February 17, 2026; 7:00 p.m., ESPN+		Akron	L 73–90	9–17 (3–10)	21 – Williams	8 – Swartz	6 – Williams	University Arena (1,239); Kalamazoo, MI
February 21, 2026; 5:00 p.m., ESPN+		at Central Michigan	L 70–83	9–18 (3–11)	16 – Brewer	10 – Swartz	3 – Ryans	McGuirk Arena (2,888); Mount Pleasant, MI
February 24, 2026; 7:00 p.m., ESPN+		at Bowling Green	W 88–79	10–18 (4–11)	17 – Tied	12 – Brewer	4 – Williams	Stroh Center (1,969); Bowling Green, OH
February 27, 2026; 6:00 p.m., CBSSN		No. 21 Miami (OH)	L 67–69	10–19 (4–12)	19 – Brewer	11 – Brewer	3 – Ryans	University Arena (3,193); Kalamazoo, MI
March 3, 2026; 7:00 p.m., ESPN+		Ball State	L 71–74 ^{OT}	10–20 (4–13)	22 – Williams	13 – Brewer	2 – Tied	University Arena (1,206); Kalamazoo, MI
March 6, 2026; 7:00 p.m., ESPN+		at Kent State	L 78–86	10–21 (4–14)	20 – Brewer	8 – Williams	6 – Griffith	MAC Center (2,421); Kent, OH
*Non-conference game. ^{#}Rankings from AP poll. (#) Tournament seedings in parentheses. All times are in Eastern.
