= 2025–26 Youngstown State Penguins men's basketball team =

American college basketball season

2025–26 Youngstown State Penguins men's basketball
- Conference: Horizon League
- Record: 15–17 (8–12 Horizon)
- Head coach: Ethan Faulkner (2nd season)
- Associate head coach: Dwaine Osborne
- Assistant coaches: Danny Reese; Anthony Johnson; Mark Richmond
- Home arena: Beeghly Center

2025–26 Horizon League men's basketball standings
| | Conf. | | | | Overall |
| Team | W | | L | PCT | W | | L | PCT |
|---|---|---|---|---|---|---|---|---|
| Wright State † | 15 | – | 5 | .750 | 23 | – | 12 | .657 |
| Robert Morris | 13 | – | 7 | .650 | 22 | – | 11 | .667 |
| Detroit Mercy | 12 | – | 8 | .600 | 17 | – | 15 | .531 |
| Oakland | 12 | – | 8 | .600 | 16 | – | 16 | .500 |
| Green Bay | 12 | – | 8 | .600 | 18 | – | 15 | .545 |
| Purdue Fort Wayne | 11 | – | 9 | .550 | 17 | – | 15 | .531 |
| Northern Kentucky | 10 | – | 10 | .500 | 20 | – | 14 | .588 |
| Milwaukee | 8 | – | 12 | .400 | 12 | – | 20 | .375 |
| Youngstown State | 8 | – | 12 | .400 | 15 | – | 17 | .469 |
| Cleveland State | 6 | – | 14 | .300 | 11 | – | 22 | .333 |
| IU Indy | 3 | – | 17 | .150 | 7 | – | 25 | .219 |
† 2026 Horizon League tournament winner

The 2025–26 Youngstown State Penguins men's basketball team represented Youngstown State University during the 2025–26 NCAA Division I men's basketball season. The Penguins, led by second-year head coach Ethan Faulkner, played their home games at the Beeghly Center in Youngstown, Ohio as members of the Horizon League.

== Previous season ==
The Penguins finished the 2024–25 season 21–13, 13–7 in Horizon League play, to finish in fourth place. They were defeated by Robert Morris in the championship game of the Horizon League tournament.

== Offseason ==
=== Departures ===
Youngstown State departures
| Name | Number | Pos. | Height | Year | Hometown | Reason for departure |
|---|---|---|---|---|---|---|
| Ty Harper | 1 | G | 6' 3" | Fifth-year Senior | Norcross, GA | Transferred to Oral Roberts |
| Christian Kirkland | 2 | F | 6' 9" | RS Freshman | Philadelphia, PA | Transferred to Palm Beach Atlantic (DII) |
| EJ Farmer | 3 | G | 6' 5" | Senior | Cleveland, OH | Graduated; Signed to SAM Basket Massagno |
| Elijah Guillory | 4 | G | 6' 5" | Freshman | Moon Township, PA | Transferred to Tallahassee State College (NJCAA) |
| Siem Uijtendaal | 5 | G | 6' 6" | Fifth-year Senior | Haarlem, Netherlands | Graduated; Signed with Den Helder Suns |
| Nik Hendrix | 8 | G | 6' 1" | Sophomore | Hubbard, OH | Left program |
| Juwan Maxey | 11 | G | 6' 1" | Junior | Detroit, MI | Transferred to Ball State |
| David Wilkerson | 13 | G | 6' 4" | RS Sophomore | Lansing, MI | Transferred to Grand Valley State (DII) |
| Dante DePante | 14 | G | 6' 4" | RS Freshman | Pittsburgh, PA | Transferred to Palm Beach Atlantic (DII) |
| Kevin Hamilton | 25 | G | 6' 7" | Sophomore | Akron, OH | Transferred to Mount Union (DIII) |
| Nico Galette | 44 | G | 6' 6" | Fifth-year Senior | Rahway, NJ | Graduated; Signed with CB Menorca |
| Gabe Dynes | 45 | C | 7' 3" | Sophomore | Independence, KY | Transferred to USC |

=== Incoming transfers ===
Youngstown State incoming transfers
| Name | No. | Pos. | Ht. | Wt. | Year | Hometown | Previous school |
|---|---|---|---|---|---|---|---|
| Cam Polak | 1 | G | 6' 2" | 185 | Sixth-year senior | West Homestead, PA | PennWest California |
| Rich Rolf | 2 | F | 6' 7" | 210 | RS Junior | Centerville, OH | Charlotte |
| Derrick Anderson | 3 | G | 6' 1" | 180 | Fifth-year senior | Boardman, OH | Lake Erie |
| Tyler Robinett | 4 | F | 6' 8" | 215 | Sixth-year senior | Middleton, ID | College of Idaho |
| Drew King | 6 | G | 6' 3" | 190 | RS Junior | Phoenix, AZ | Elon |
| Vlad Salaridze | 7 | F | 6' 7" | 230 | Sixth-year senior | Tbilisi, Georgia | UT Martin |
| Bryson Dawkins | 9 | G | 6' 2" | 200 | Senior | Dothan, AL | Houston Christian |
| Tae Blackshear | 77 | G | 6' 6" | 180 | Junior | Atlanta, GA | McLennan CC |

=== 2025 recruiting class ===
College recruiting
| Name | Hometown | School | Height | Weight | Commit date |
|---|---|---|---|---|---|
| Jaiden Haynes; G | Atlanta, GA | Moravian Prep | 6 ft 3 in (1.91 m) | 170 lb (77 kg) | Sep 13, 2024 |
| Jaiden Haynes; G | Recruit ratings: No ratings found | | | | |
| Markus Navarra; F | Saranac Lake, NY | Lee Academy | 6 ft 8 in (2.03 m) | N/A | May 24, 2025 |
| Markus Navarra; F | Recruit ratings: No ratings found | | | | |
| Connor Swider; F | Portsmouth, RI | Worcester Academy | 6 ft 9 in (2.06 m) | N/A | Oct 2, 2024 |
| Connor Swider; F | Recruit ratings: No ratings found | | | | |
Overall recruit ranking:
Note: In many cases, Scout, Rivals, 247Sports, On3, and ESPN may conflict in their listings of height and weight.; In these cases, the average was taken. ESPN grades are on a 100-point scale.; Sources: "2025 Team Ranking". Rivals.

== Preseason ==
On October 8, 2025, the Horizon League released their preseason poll. Youngstown State was picked to finish third in the conference, while receiving two first-place votes. One player was named to the preseason All-Horizon League First Team.

=== Preseason rankings ===
Horizon League Preseason Coaches Poll
| Rank | Team | Points |
|---|---|---|
| 1 | Milwaukee | 428 (24) |
| 2 | Oakland | 384 (7) |
| 3 | Youngstown State | 364 (2) |
| 4 | Robert Morris | 345 (8) |
| 5 | Purdue Fort Wayne | 287 (1) |
| 6 | Northern Kentucky | 274 |
| 7 | Wright State | 221 |
| 8 | Cleveland State | 217 (2) |
| 9 | Detroit Mercy | 176 |
| 10 | IU Indy | 115 |
| 11 | Green Bay | 93 |
(#) first-place votes

=== Preseason All-Horizon League Teams ===
Preseason All-Horizon League Teams
| Team | Player | Position | Year |
|---|---|---|---|
| First | Cris Carroll | Forward | Senior |

== Roster ==
2025–26 Youngstown State Penguins men's basketball team
Players
Coaches

| Pos. | # | Name | Height | Weight | Year | Previous school | Hometown |
|---|---|---|---|---|---|---|---|
| G | 0 | Jason Nelson | 5 ft 10 in (1.78 m) | 175 lb (79 kg) | RS Sr | VCU | Richmond, VA |
| G | 1 | Cam Polak (6Y) | 6 ft 2 in (1.88 m) | 185 lb (84 kg) | Sr | PennWest California | West Homestead, PA |
| F | 2 | Rich Rolf | 6 ft 7 in (2.01 m) | 210 lb (95 kg) | RS Jr | Charlotte | Centerville, OH |
| G | 3 | Derrick Anderson (5Y) | 6 ft 1 in (1.85 m) | 180 lb (82 kg) | Sr | Lake Erie | Boardman, OH |
| F | 4 | Tyler Robinett (6Y) | 6 ft 8 in (2.03 m) | 215 lb (98 kg) | Sr | College of Idaho | Middleton, ID |
| G | 5 | Shaheed Solebo | 6 ft 4 in (1.93 m) | 205 lb (93 kg) | RS Fr | Lane Tech | Chicago, IL |
| G | 6 | Drew King | 6 ft 3 in (1.91 m) | 190 lb (86 kg) | RS Jr | Elon | Phoenix, AZ |
| F | 7 | Vlad Salaridze (6Y) | 6 ft 7 in (2.01 m) | 230 lb (104 kg) | Sr | UT Martin | Tbilisi, Georgia |
| G | 8 | Jaiden Haynes | 6 ft 3 in (1.91 m) | 185 lb (84 kg) | Fr | Moravian Prep | Atlanta, GA |
| G | 9 | Bryson Dawkins | 6 ft 2 in (1.88 m) | 200 lb (91 kg) | Sr | Houston Christian | Dothan, AL |
| C | 10 | Imanuel Zorgvol | 7 ft 0 in (2.13 m) | 215 lb (98 kg) | Sr | Northern Kentucky | Paramaribo, Suriname |
| F | 13 | Markus Navarra | 6 ft 8 in (2.03 m) | 225 lb (102 kg) | Fr | Lee Academy | Saranac Lake, NY |
| F | 15 | Cris Carroll | 6 ft 6 in (1.98 m) | 230 lb (104 kg) | Sr | Coffeyville CC | Tallahassee, FL |
| F | 21 | Connor Swider | 6 ft 9 in (2.06 m) | 200 lb (91 kg) | Fr | Worcester Academy | Portsmouth, RI |
| G | 77 | Tae Blackshear | 6 ft 6 in (1.98 m) | 180 lb (82 kg) | Jr | McLennan CC | Atlanta, GA |

Head coach

- Ethan Faulkner (Northern Kentucky)

Assistant coach(es)

- Dwaine Osborne (Clearwater Christian)
- Danny Reese (Wooster)
- Anthony Johnson (Clemson)
- Mark Richmond (West Virginia)

Legend

- (C) Team captain
- (S) Suspended
- (I) Ineligible
- (W) Walk-on
- (5Y) Fifth-year senior
- (6Y) Sixth-year senior
- Injured
- Current redshirt

Roster
Last update: November 17, 2025

== Schedule and results ==
| Date time, TV | Rank^{#} | Opponent^{#} | Result | Record | High points | High rebounds | High assists | Site (attendance) city, state |
Exhibition
| October 29, 2025*; 6:30 p.m. | | Akron | W 84–78 | – | 19 – Blackshear | 8 – Rolf | 5 – Polak | Beeghly Center (502); Youngstown, OH |
Regular season
| November 3, 2025*; 7:00 p.m., ACCNX | | at Pittsburgh | L 59–74 | 0–1 | 18 – Carroll | 5 – Polak | 3 – Blackshear | Petersen Events Center (5,050); Pittsburgh, PA |
| November 7, 2025*; 9:00 p.m., MW Network | | at Grand Canyon | W 90–81 | 1–1 | 18 – Zorgvol | 10 – King | 8 – King | Global Credit Union Arena (7,142); Phoenix, AZ |
| November 10, 2025*; 6:30 p.m., ESPN+ | | Penn State Shenango | W 115–53 | 2–1 | 18 – Zorgvol | 10 – Rolf | 6 – King | Beeghly Center (1,861); Youngstown, OH |
| November 15, 2025*; 4:00 p.m., ESPN+/YES Network | | at St. Bonaventure | L 80–84 | 2–2 | 14 – Rolf | 5 – 2 tied | 3 – 3 tied | Reilly Center (4,084); St. Bonaventure, NY |
| November 19, 2025*; 7:00 p.m., ESPN+ | | at Toledo | L 75–92 | 2–3 | 16 – Dawkins | 5 – Dawkins | 5 – King | Savage Arena (3,741); Toledo, OH |
| November 23, 2025*; 5:30 p.m. | | vs. UNC Greensboro; Jacksonville Classic | L 62–68 | 2–4 | 18 – Dawkins | 8 – Carroll | 2 – Nelson | John Hurst Adams Gymnasium (346); Jacksonville, FL |
| November 24, 2025*; 6:30 p.m. | | vs. Georgia Southern; Jacksonville Classic | W 67–61 | 3–4 | 22 – Rolf | 6 – 2 tied | 4 – King | John Hurst Adams Gymnasium (542); Jacksonville, FL |
| November 28, 2025*; 3:00 p.m., ESPN+ | | Chicago State | W 87–64 | 4–4 | 15 – 2 tied | 5 – 2 tied | 5 – Nelson | Beeghly Center (1,356); Youngstown, OH |
| December 3, 2025; 6:30 p.m., ESPN+ | | Wright State | W 69–68 | 5–4 (1–0) | 19 – Carroll | 7 – Carroll | 3 – Blackshear | Beeghly Center (1,471); Youngstown, OH |
| December 6, 2025; 2:00 p.m., ESPN+ | | at IU Indy | W 78–55 | 6–4 (2–0) | 20 – Rolf | 8 – Salaridze | 4 – Nelson | The Jungle (629); Indianapolis, IN |
| December 14, 2025*; 2:00 p.m., ESPN+ | | Thiel | W 103–52 | 7–4 | 17 – Carroll | 8 – Dawkins | 8 – King | Beeghly Center (1,526); Youngstown, OH |
| December 17, 2025; 7:00 p.m., ESPN+ | | at Robert Morris | L 77–80 ^{OT} | 7–5 (2–1) | 31 – Carroll | 5 – Dawkins | 3 – 2 tied | UPMC Events Center (1,407); Moon Township, PA |
| December 20, 2025*; 1:00 p.m., ESPN+ | | USC Upstate | W 74–65 | 8–5 | 27 – Carroll | 7 – Carroll | 5 – Carroll | Beeghly Center (3,041); Youngstown, OH |
| December 29, 2025; 6:30 p.m., ESPN+ | | Detroit Mercy | L 68–73 | 8–6 (2–2) | 15 – Carroll | 8 – Carroll | 3 – King | Beeghly Center (1,519); Youngstown, OH |
| January 1, 2026; 1:00 p.m., ESPN+ | | Oakland | L 83–85 | 8–7 (2–3) | 20 – Dawkins | 7 – 2 tied | 8 – Nelson | Beeghly Center (1,396); Youngstown, OH |
| January 4, 2026; 4:00 p.m., ESPN+ | | at Northern Kentucky | L 79–94 | 8–8 (2–4) | 26 – Carroll | 5 – Carroll | 6 – Nelson | Truist Arena (1,930); Highland Heights, KY |
| January 7, 2026; 7:17 p.m., ESPN+ | | Purdue Fort Wayne | L 69–71 | 8–9 (2–5) | 14 – Carroll | 10 – Rolf | 4 – Salaridze | Beeghly Center (1,784); Youngstown, OH |
| January 9, 2026*; 11:00 a.m., ESPN+ | | Bryant & Stratton | W 99–61 | 9–9 | 18 – Carroll | 13 – Salaridze | 7 – King | Beeghly Center (4,637); Youngstown, OH |
| January 15, 2026; 7:00 p.m., ESPN+ | | at Wright State | L 83–93 | 9–10 (2–6) | 19 – Dawkins | 7 – Salaridze | 5 – King | Nutter Center (4,724); Fairborn, OH |
| January 17, 2026; 2:00 pm, ESPN+ | | at Cleveland State | L 78–80 | 9–11 (2–7) | 21 – Carroll | 11 – Carroll | 6 – Nelson | Wolstein Center (1,964); Cleveland, OH |
| January 22, 2026; 6:30 p.m., ESPN+ | | Green Bay | W 88–81 | 10–11 (3–7) | 34 – Carroll | 7 – Carroll | 6 – Nelson | Beeghly Center (1,721); Youngstown, OH |
| January 24, 2026; 1:00 p.m., ESPN+ | | Milwaukee | L 64–65 | 10–12 (3–8) | 19 – Carroll | 9 – Rolf | 2 – 4 tied | Beeghly Center (2,187); Youngstown, OH |
| January 30, 2026; 6:30 p.m., ESPN+ | | IU Indy | W 85–76 | 11–12 (4–8) | 18 – 2 tied | 9 – Dawkins | 7 – Dawkins | Beeghly Center (1,644); Youngstown, OH |
| February 4, 2026; 7:00 p.m., ESPN+ | | at Purdue Fort Wayne | W 90–61 | 12–12 (5–8) | 18 – Dawkins | 8 – Zorgvol | 4 – Carroll | Memorial Coliseum (1,728); Fort Wayne, IN |
| February 7, 2026; 4:30 p.m., ESPN+ | | Robert Morris | L 66–72 | 12–13 (5–9) | 20 – Carroll | 5 – Dawkins | 5 – Nelson | Beeghly Center (2,245); Youngstown, OH |
| February 12, 2026; 7:00 p.m., ESPN+ | | at Oakland | W 86–82 | 13–13 (6–9) | 26 – Polak | 10 – Carroll | 6 – Rolf | OU Credit Union O'rena (2,402); Auburn Hills, MI |
| February 15, 2026; 1:00 p.m., ESPN+ | | at Detroit Mercy | L 70–76 | 13–14 (6–10) | 22 – Blackshear | 7 – Rolf | 3 – Dawkins | Calihan Hall (1,111); Detroit, MI |
| February 18, 2026; 6:30 p.m., ESPN+ | | Cleveland State | W 106−82 | 14−14 (7−10) | 26 – Carroll | 6 – 3 tied | 6 – Carroll | Beeghly Center (1,790); Youngstown, OH |
| February 22, 2026; 2:00 p.m., ESPN+ | | Northern Kentucky | W 64–58 | 15–14 (8–10) | 22 – Dawkins | 10 – Carroll | 5 – Nelson | Beeghly Center (2,344); Youngstown, OH |
| February 25, 2026; 8:00 p.m., ESPN+ | | at Milwaukee | L 65–78 | 15–15 (8–11) | 13 – Carroll | 10 – Rolf | 6 – Rolf | UW–Milwaukee Panther Arena (2,047); Milwaukee, WI |
| February 28, 2026; 2:00 p.m., ESPN+ | | at Green Bay | L 63–85 | 15–16 (8–12) | 22 – Carroll | 4 – 4 tied | 5 – Nelson | Kress Center (2,438); Green Bay, WI |
Horizon League tournament
| March 4, 2026; 7:00 p.m., ESPN+ | (9) | at (2) Robert Morris; First round | L 53–68 | 15–17 | 18 – Salaridze | 9 – Salaridze | 3 – Nelson | UPMC Events Center (3,537); Moon Township, PA |
*Non-conference game. ^{#}Rankings from AP poll. (#) Tournament seedings in parentheses. All times are in Eastern.
