= Brandon Pritzl =

American basketball player and coach

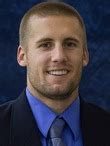

Current position
- Title: General Manager & Assistant Coach
- Team: Toledo
- Conference: MAC

Biographical details
- Born: January 7, 1992 (age 34); De Pere, Wisconsin, U.S.

Playing career
- 2010–2014: Hillsdale

Coaching career (HC unless noted)
- 2014–2016: Ohio (GA)
- 2016–2019: Hillsdale (assistant)
- 2019–2020: Hillsdale (associate HC)
- 2020–2023: Green Bay (assistant)
- 2023–present: Toledo (assistant)

Brandon Pritzl (born January 7, 1992) is an American basketball coach. He is an assistant coach at the University of Toledo.

== Coaching career ==
=== Ohio graduate assistant ===
Pritzl was a graduate assistant at Ohio under Saul Phillips from 2014 to 2016. While with the Bobcats, Pritzl was responsible for many aspects of the program’s day-to-day operations, including ticket management, keeping recruiting databases up to date, and working with the Jump Program and the school’s summer camps.

=== Hillsdale Assistant ===
Pritzl returned to take the place of another former Charger, Luke Laser, on the coaching staff before the 2016-17 season.

=== Hillsdale associate head coach ===
April 2020, Pritzl was named associate head coach for the Hillsdale men's basketball program.

=== UWGB Assistant ===
On July 6, 2020, Pritzl was announced as the new assistant coach at Green Bay.

=== Toledo Assistant ===
On June 22, 2023, Pritzl was announced as the new assistant coach at Toledo.

On June 9, 2026, Pritzl was promoted to general manager and assistant coach at Toledo.

== Personal ==
Brandon's father, Brian, played college basketball at St. Norbert College and his brother, Brevin, played for the Wisconsin Badgers and is currently playing professionally in Europe. Brevin has previously played for Leuven in Belgium, Team FOG Næstved in Denmark and for Tamiš of the Basketball League of Serbia.
